= Dustheads =

1982 painting by Jean-Michel Basquiat

- Artist: Jean-Michel Basquiat
- Year: 1982
- Medium: Acrylic, oilstick, spray enamel and metallic paint on canvas
- Movement: Neo-expressionism
- Dimensions: 180 cm × 210 cm (72 in × 84 in)
- Location: Private collection

Dustheads is a painting created by American artist Jean-Michel Basquiat in 1982. In May 2013, it sold for $48.8 million at Christie's, which at the time was a record high for a Basquiat painting sold at auction.

== History ==
Dustheads depicts two drug addicts on angel dust as frenetic radiant characters immersed in black backdrop. The painting was previously in the collection of Tiqui Atencio, who purchased it from art dealer Tony Shafrazi in 1996.

In May 2013, businessman Jho Low purchased it for $48.8 million at Christie's, which at the time was the record for most expensive Basquiat painting sold at auction. The record was surpassed by Untitled (1982), a depiction of a devil, for $57.3 million at a Christie's auction in 2016. The next year, Basquiat set a new record high with Untitled (1982), a depiction of a skull, for $110.5 million at Sotheby's.

In 2016, Low sold Dustheads at a loss for $35 million amidst an investigation by federal authorities regarding assets allegedly bought with funds stolen from the 1Malaysia Development Berhad (1MDB) development fund.

== See also ==
- List of paintings by Jean-Michel Basquiat
