= Flesh and Spirit (painting) =

Painting by Jean-Michel Basquiat

- Artist: Jean-Michel Basquiat
- Year: 1982–83
- Medium: Oilstick, gesso, acrylic and paper on canvas
- Movement: Neo-expressionism
- Dimensions: 368.3 cm × 368.3 cm (145.0 in × 145.0 in)
- Location: Private collection

Flesh and Spirit is a painting created by American artist Jean-Michel Basquiat c. 1982–83. The multi-panel painting, which is one of the largest ever made by Basquiat, sold for $30.7 million at Sotheby's in May 2018.

== History ==
Flesh and Spirit is made up of two horizontal panels hinged to create four quadrants, measuring a combined 12 x 12 feet. The title is a reference to Robert Farris Thompson’s 1983 book Flash of the Spirit: African and Afro-American Philosophy, which Basquiat said was "probably the best book I ever read on African art. It's one of the best." The artwork features elements of a skeleton, a brain and a disembodied hand, along with texts like "SPIRIT," "POTATO," and "FLESH." Basquiat had a fascination with the human anatomy since he was a child. A major reference source used throughout his career was the book Gray's Anatomy. After he was hit by a car, his mother had given him the book while he was in the hospital recovering from a broken arm and various internal injuries.

Flesh and Spirit was acquired by art collector and patron of the arts Dolores Neumann, who was also an art dealer for graffiti artists. She represented artists such as Crash, Daze, Lady Pink, Rammellzee, and Toxic, who was Basquiat's studio assistant. She purchased the painting for $15,000 shortly after it was completed, and before it was exhibited at the Champions show at Tony Shafrazi Gallery in January 1983. Before the show, Neumann had heard Basquiat painted a new piece and she went to see it at the gallery. After only seeing the arm on the lower left side of the painting, she decided she was going to ask her parents for money to purchase the artwork. It remained in the Neumann Family Collection until it was auctioned in 2018. Two weeks prior to the auction, Hubert Neumann sued to block the sale of the painting, claiming the sale violated an agreement he had with Sotheby's that gave him the right to approve "all matters" concerning the marketing of works from the "Family Collection." The case was dismissed because Dolores Neumann was the sole owner of the painting.

In May 2018, Flesh and Spirit sold for $30.7 million at Sotheby's New York Contemporary Art Evening Auction. After the sale, Belinda Neumann-Donnelly, representing her mother's estate, filed a $100 million lawsuit against her father. She claimed his attempt to block the sale deterred potential buyers and greatly depressed the value of the painting. She noted that Basquiat's Flexible (1984) sold for $45.3 by Phillips auction house the next day. Dolores Neumann died in 2016, and the lawsuit revealed that in her will, she explicitly disinherited her estranged husband.

== Exhibitions ==
Flesh and Spirit has been exhibited at the following art institutions:

- Champions at Tony Shafrazi Gallery in New York, January–February 1983.
- La Scuola di Atene: Il Sistema Dell'Arte at Palazzo di Città in Acireale; Regione Lazio Centro Culturale Cembalo Borghese, Palazzo Borghese in Rome; Gallerie Civiche d'Arte Moderna, Palazzo dei Diamanti in Ferrara; Museo laboratorio Casablanca in Malo, December 1983–April 1984.

== See also ==
- List of paintings by Jean-Michel Basquiat
- 1982 in art
