= List of paintings by Jean-Michel Basquiat =

The following is a list of significant artworks by the American artist Jean-Michel Basquiat (1960–1988), who played a historic role in the rise of street art and neo-expressionism.

During his short yet productive career, Basquiat created more than 600 paintings and 1,500 drawings. He started creating sculptures and mixed media works in 1979. In 1980, he abandoned his graffiti tag SAMO and focused on his career as a painter. The first painting he sold, Cadillac Moon (1981), was purchased by singer Debbie Harry for $200 in 1981. The top three Basquiat paintings at auction all date to 1982, which is considered his most valuable year. At a Sotheby's auction in 2017, Untitled (1982), sold for $110.5 million, becoming one of the most expensive paintings ever purchased and setting a new record high for an American artist at auction. From 1984 to 1985, Basquiat and American pop artist Andy Warhol merged their contrasting painting methods to create a series of collaborative artworks.

== Paintings and drawings ==
| Year | Title | Medium | Dimensions | Record price | Owner | |
|---|---|---|---|---|---|---|
| 1980 | Untitled (Car Crash) | Acrylic and oilstick on burlap | 41 × 70 1/2 in | $2 million (2008) | Private collection | |
| 1980 | Minor Success | Acrylic, oil stick and gold paint on mirror and wood | 43 1/4 × 22 3/8 in | $2.9 million (2020) | LeBron James and Savannah James | |
| 1981 | Untitled | Acrylic, oilstick, pencil, spray paint, paper collage on wood | 48 × 30 in | $4 million (2013) | Private collection | |
| 1981 | Untitled | Acrylic, oilstick and spray paint on canvas | 78 1/2 × 72 in | $14.6 million (2007) | Private collection | |
| 1981 | Untitled | Acrylic and oilstick on canvas | 50 × 119 in | $11.9 million (2023) | Private collection | |
| 1981 | World Crown | Acrylic, oilstick and spray paint on canva | 48 × 56 in | $11.4 million (2015) | Private collection | |
| 1981 | Masque | Acrylic and oilstick on canvas | 56 1/2 × 50 1/2 in | $4.6 million (2018) | Private collection | |
| 1981 | Pork | Acrylic, oil, oilstick on glass and wooden door with metal hinges | 83 1/4 × 33 7/8 in | $6.8 million (2016) | Private collection | |
| 1981 | Untitled (Julius Caesar on Gold) | Gold paint, acrylic and oilstick on canvas | 50 × 50 in | $6.9 million (2013) | Giancarlo Giammetti | |
| 1981 | Self-Portrait | Acrylic, oil, oilstick, paper collage on 3 hinged wooden panels | 40 × 70 in | $4.7 million (2016) | Private collection | |
| 1981 | La Hara | Acrylic and oilstick on wood panel | 72 × 47 3/4 in | $35 million (2017) | Private collection | |
| 1981 | Untitled | Acrylic, oilstick on canvas | 50 1/2 × 88 in | $9.1 million (2014) | Private collection | |
| 1981 | Untitled (Tar Tar Tar, Lead Lead Lead) | Acrylic, oilstick and metallic spray enamel on canvas | 68 × 103 in | $34.8 million (2014) | Private collection | |
| 1981 | The Field Next to the Other Road | Acrylic, spray enamel, oilstick, metallic paint and ink on canvas | 87 × 158 in | $37.1 million (2015) | Jose Mugrabi | |
| 1981 | Untitled (Fishing) | Oilstick, acrylic and spray enamel on canvas | 78 × 68 in | $26.4 million (2012) | Private collection | |
| 1981 | Untitled | Acrylic, oilstick and spray paint on canvas | 78 1/2 × 72 in | $20.1 million (2012) | Private collection | |
| 1981 | Untitled | Acrylic, oilstick, and spray paint on wood | 73 1/2 × 49 1/2 in | $16.3 million (2012) | Private collection | |
| 1981 | The Ring | Acrylic and oilstick on canvas | 60 × 48 in | $15 million (2019) | Private collection | |
| 1981 | Untitled (Fallen Angel) | Acrylic and oilstick on canvas | 66 × 78 in | $11.2 million (2008) | Private collection | |
| 1981 | Irony of Negro Policeman | Acrylic and oilstick on wood | 72 × 48 in | $12.6 million (2012) | Private collection | |
| 1981 | Untitled | Acrylic, oilstick and Xerox on wood | 48 × 30 in | $4.8 million (2019) | Private collection | |
| 1981 | Number 4 | Acrylic, oilstick, and paper collage on canvas | 65.7 × 54 in | N/A | Andre Sakhai | |
| 1981 | Cadillac Moon | Acrylic and oilstick on canvas | 63 3/4 in × 67 3/4 in | N/A | Private collection | |
| 1981 | New York, New York | Acrylic, oilstick, spray paint, and paper collage on canvas | 50 1/2 × 89 in | $10.8 million (2018) | Private collection | |
| 1981 | Untitled (Skull) | Acrylic and oilstick on canvas | 81 × 69 1/4 in | N/A | The Broad museum | |
| 1981 | Red Kings | Acrylic on wood and glass | 32 × 37 in | $6,000,000 (2024) | Private collection | |
| 1981 | Bird on Money | Acrylic and oil on canvas | 66 × 90 in | N/A | Rubell Family Collection | |
| 1981–82 | Untitled (Electric Chair) | Acrylic, gold spray paint and oilstick on canvas | 66 × 96 1/4 in | $11.8 million (2007) | Private collection | |
| 1981–82 | Cabra | Acrylic and oilstick on canvas | 60 1/4 × 60 1/2 in | $11 million (2017) | Guggenheim Abu Dhabi | |
| 1982 | Warrior | Acrylic and oilstick on wood panel | 72 × 48 in | $41.8 million (2021) | Private collection | |
| 1982 | Self-Portrait as a Heel | Acrylic and oilstick on canvas | 96 × 61 1/2 in | $42 million (2023) | Private collection | |
| 1982 | Baby Boom | Acrylic and oilstick on canvas | 49 × 84 in | $1.6 million (2001) | Brant Foundation | |
| 1982 | Untitled (Pestus) | Acrylic and oilstick on paper | 45 × 71 7/8 in | $2.9 million (2020) | Private collection | |
| 1982 | Three Delegates | Acrylic, oilstick and collage on canvas | 60 × 60 in | $6.7 million (2015) | Private collection | |
| 1982 | Crisis X | Acrylic, oilstick and collage on canvas | 60 × 60 in | $2.5 million (2013) | Private collection | |
| 1982 | Ribs Ribs | Oilstick on paper | 97 × 95 3/4 in | $5.1 million (2013) | Private collection | |
| 1982 | Bronze | Acrylic, gold paint and oil stick on canvas with wooden supports | 60 × 60 in | $6.6 million (2017) | Private collection | |
| 1982 | Portrait of A-One A.K.A. King | Acrylic, oilstick and marker on canvas with wood supports | 72 × 72 3/8 in | $11.5 million (2020) | Private collection | |
| 1982 | Crown Hotel (Mona Lisa Black Background) | Acrylic and paper collage on canvas mounted on a cross frame | 48 13/16 × 85 in | $7.4 million (2013) | Private collection | |
| 1982 | Untitled | Oilstick and graphite on paper | 27 5/8 × 38 7/8 in | $4.5 million (2018) | Private collection | |
| 1982 | Mater | Acrylic and oilstick on canvas | 72 × 84 in | $5.8 million (2009) | Private collection | |
| 1982 | Rape of the Roman Torsos | Acrylic, oilstick and paper collage on canvas | 84 × 54 in | $2.1 million (2011) | Private collection | |
| 1982 | Equals Pi | Acrylic and oilstick on canvas | 72 × 72 in | $15–20 million (Note: This was a private purchase, not an auction sale.) | Tiffany & Co. | |
| 1982 | Charles the First | Acrylic and oilstick on canvas, triptych | 78 × 62 in | N/A | Private collection | |
| 1982 | Leonardo da Vinci's Greatest Hits | Acrylic, oil paintstick and paper collage on canvas | 72.2 in × 83.9 in | N/A | Schorr Family Collection | |
| 1982 | Beef Ribs Longhorn | Acrylic, oilstick, and paper collage on canvas with wood supports | 60 × 60 in | N/A | The Broad museum | |
| 1982 | Obnoxious Liberals | Acrylic, oilstick, and spray paint on canvas | 68 × 102 in | N/A | The Broad museum | |
| 1982 | Il Duce | Acrylic, oilstick on canvas | 60 × 60 in | $14.9 million (2022) | Private collection | |
| 1982 | The Guilt of Gold Teeth | Acrylic, spray paint and oilstick on canvas | 94 1/2 × 165 7/8 in | $40 million (2021) | Private collection | |
| 1982 | Red Warrior | Acrylic and oil stick on linen | 77 × 78 in | $20.9 million (2021) | Private collection | |
| 1982 | Versus Medici | Acrylic, oilstick and paper collage on three joined canvases | 84 1/4 × 54 1/4 in | $50.8 million (2021) | Private collection | |
| 1982 | Multiflavors | Acrylic and oilstick on canvas with tied wood supports | 60 1/2 × 61in | $16.6 million (2018) | Private collection | |
| 1982 | Profit I | Acrylic and spray paint on canvas | 86 1/2 × 157 1/2 in | $5.5 million (2002) | Private collection | |
| 1982 | Offensive Orange | Acrylic and oilstick on wood, in two parts | 71 7/8 × 96 in | $3 million (2004) | Private collector | |
| 1982 | Untitled (One Eyed Man or Xerox Face) | Acrylic, spray paint, oilstick and Xerox collage on panel | 72 × 48 in | $30.2 million (2021) | Private collection | |
| 1982 | Sugar Ray Robinson | Acrylic and oilstick on canvas | 59 7/8 × 48 1/4 in | $32.6 million (2022) | Private collection | |
| 1982 | Untitled | Oilstick on paper | 16 × 13 1/2 in | $4.4 million (2018) | Private collection | |
| 1982 | Untitled | Acrylic, oil, oilstick and spray paint on canvas | 72 × 48 in | $9 million (2018) | Private collection | |
| 1982 | Untitled | Acrylic, oilstick, spray paint and Xerox collage on canvas | 72 × 48 in | $19.4 million (2018) | Private collection | |
| 1982 | Untitled | Acrylic and enamel on blanket with tied wood supports and twine | 67 1/4 × 60 1/4 in | $5.8 million (2016) | Private collection | |
| 1982 | Brown Eggs | Oilstick on paper | 24 1/4 × 18 in | $5.3 million (2019) | Private collection | |
| 1982 | Untitled (Orange Sports Figure) | Acrylic, oil stick and spray paint on canvas | 60 × 48 1/4 in | $9.3 million (2018) | Private collection | |
| 1982 | Red Rabbit | Acrylic and oilstick on canvas | 64 × 69 in | $6.6 million (2018) | Private collection | |
| 1982 | Untitled (Prophet I) | Acrylic, oilstick and paper collage on canvas | 95 1/4 × 59 3/8 in | $9.5 million (2008) | Private collection | |
| 1982 | Untitled (Two Heads on Gold) | Acrylic and oilstick on canvas | 80 × 125 in | $4.6 million (2003) | Private collection | |
| 1982 | Untitled (Head) | Ink and oilstick on paper | 30 × 22 in | $4.1 million (2019) | Private collection | |
| 1982 | Self Portrait as a Heel | Acrylic and oilstick on canvas | 50 × 40 in | $5.9 million (2010) | Private collection | |
| 1982 | Furious Man | Oilstick, acrylic, wax crayon and ink on paper | 30 × 22 in | $5.7 million (2013) | Private collection | |
| 1982 | Man Struck by Lightning – 2 Witnesses | Acrylic and oilstick on canvas with wooden supports | 72 × 72 in | $4.8 million (2010) | Private collection | |
| 1982 | Red Skull | Acrylic, oilstick and paper collage on canvas | 60 × 60 in | $21.6 million (2017) | Private collection | |
| 1982 | Untitled | Felt tip, wax crayon, charcoal, ink and graphite | 14 × 11 in | $2.4 million (2017) | Private collection | |
| 1982 | Extra Cigarette | Acrylic and oilstick on wood and glass window with chain | 33 1/4 × 33 1/4 | $5.6 million (2019) | Private collection | |
| 1982 | Slave Auction | Oil paint, acrylics and collage on paper mounted on canvas | 72 × 120 1/4 in | N/A | Private collection | |
| 1982 | Price of Gasoline in the Third World | Acrylic, oil paintstick and paper collage on canvas | 60 × 120 in | N/A | Private collection | |
| 1982 | Native Carrying Some Guns, Bibles, Amorites on Safari | Acrylic, oil and oil paintstick on canvas with wood support | 72 × 72 in | N/A | Private collection | |
| 1982 | Humidity | Acrylic, oilstick, and Xerox collage on canvas | 96 × 72 in | $12.2 million (2016) | Private collection | |
| 1982 | Untitled | Acrylic, oil, oilstick and spray paint on canvas | 72 × 48 in | $9 million (2018) | Private collection | |
| 1982 | Made in Japan I | Acrylic and oilstick on paper mounted on canvas | 60 1/2 × 38 1/2 in | $8 million (2014) | Private collection | |
| 1982 | Boy and Dog in a Johnnypump | Oil on canvas | 96 × 164 in | $100 million (2020) (Note: This was a private purchase, not an auction sale.) | Ken Griffin | |
| 1982 | Untitled (Yellow Bone King) | Acrylic and oilstick on wood panel | 72 × 48 in | $29.2 million (2013) | Private collection | |
| 1982 | Untitled (Diptych) | Acrylic and oilstick on panel | 72 × 96 in | $29 million (2013) | Private collection | |
| 1982 | Untitled | Acrylic on canvas | 94 × 197 in | $85 million (2022) | Private collection | |
| 1982 | Untitled | Acrylic, spray paint and oilstick on canvas | 72 1/8 × 68 1/8 in | $110.5 million (2017) | Yusaku Maezawa | |
| 1982 | Dustheads | Acrylic, oilstick, spray enamel and metallic paint on canvas | 72 × 84 in | $48.8 million (2013) | Private collection | |
| 1982 | Untitled (Yellow Tar and Feathers) | Acrylic, oilstick, crayon, paper collage, feathers on wood panel | 96 1/2 × 90 1/4 in | $25.9 million (2013) | Private collection | |
| 1982 | Untitled (Pollo Frito) | Acrylic, oil, and enamel on two canvases | 60 × 120 1/2 in | $25.7 million (2018) | Private collection | |
| 1982 | Untitled (Head) | Oilstick, ink and acrylic on paper | 29 3/4 × 22 in | $15.2 million (2020) | Private collection | |
| 1982 | Untitled (Boxer) | Acrylic and oil paintstick on linen | 76 × 94 in | $13.5 million (2008) | Private collection | |
| 1982 | Untitled | Acrylic and oil stick on black paper | 48 × 72 in | $10.8 million (2020) | Private collection | |
| 1982 | Untitled | Oilstick and ink on paper | 42 3/4 × 30 3/8 in | $13.6 million (2015) | Private collection | |
| 1982 | Four Big | Acrylic, oil stick and paper collage on three canvases | 78 × 63 in | $10.6 million (2019) | Private collection | |
| 1982 | Mecca | Acrylic and oilstick on canvas mounted on wood supports | 70 × 68 7/8 in | $4.5 million (2013) | Jay-Z | |
| 1982 | Both Poles | Acrylic, oilstick and paper collage on canvas with wood supports | 72 1/2 × 72 1/4 in | $4.9 million (2017) | Private collection | |
| 1982 | Philistines | Acrylic and oilstick on canvas | 72 × 123 in | N/A | Irma and Norman Barman | |
| 1982 | Untitled (Gem Spa) | Acrylic on canvas | 72 × 56 in | N/A | Private collection | |
| 1982 | A Panel of Experts | Acrylic and oil paintstick and paper collage on canvas | 60 × 60 in | N/A | Montreal Museum of Fine Arts | |
| 1982 | Dos Cabezas | Acrylic and oilstick on canvas with wood supports | 59 3/4 × 60 1/2 in | $7 million (2010) | Private collection | |
| 1982 | Untitled | Oilstick on paper | 20 1/8 × 16 1/8 in | $2.5 million (2018) | Private collection | |
| 1982 | Untitled (Head of Madman) | Oilstick on paper mounted on linen | 43 × 30 3/4 in | $12 million (2013) | Private collection | |
| 1982 | Untitled (the Black Athlete) | Acrylic and oilstick on canvas | 71 1/2 × 60 in | $6.3 million (2015) | Private collection | |
| 1982 | Hannibal | Acrylic, oilstick and paper collage on canvas with wooden supports | 60 × 60 in | $13.1 million (2016) | Private collection | |
| 1982 | Palm Springs Jump | Acrylic, oilstick and gold paint on canvas | 72 × 84 in | $12.8 million (2008) | Private collection | |
| 1982 | Untitled | Aacrylic and oilstick on canvas mounted on wood supports | 60 1/2 × 60 1/2 in | $4.2 million (2014) | Private collection | |
| 1982 | Santo 3 | Acrylic, oilstick, crayon, paper collage on canvas with wood supports | 36 × 36 in | $4.9 million (2019) | Private collection | |
| 1982 | Self-Portrait | Acrylic, oil paintstick, and spray paint on canvas | 76 × 94 in | $3.3 million (1998) | Bo Franzen | |
| 1982 | Self-Portrait | Crayon, felt tip pen, and acrylic on paper | 29 7/8 × 22 1/4 in | $4 million (2012) | Private collection | |
| 1982 | Untitled (Figure Jmb #1) | Acrylic and oilstick on paper | 39 3/8 × 27 7/8 in | $3.6 million (2018) | Private collection | |
| 1982 | The Mosque | Acrylic, oilstick, ink on paper collage and canvas with wood supports | 60 × 60 in | $5.1 million (2020) | Scott Lynn | |
| 1982 | Man from Naples | Acrylic and oilstick on canvas | 124 × 246 cm | N/A | Guggenheim Museum Bilbao | |
| 1982 | Moses and the Egyptians | Acrylic and oilstick on canvas | 186 × 137 cm | N/A | Guggenheim Museum Bilbao | |
| 1982 | Untitled | Oilstick on paperboard | 60 × 40 in | $8.6 million (2017) | Private collection | |
| 1982 | Baptismal | Acrylic on canvas | 96 × 96 in | $1.4 million (1999) | Private collection | |
| 1982 | Donut Revenge | Acrylic, oilstick and paper collage on canvas | 95 3/4 × 72 in | $20.9 million (2021) | Private collection | |
| 1982 | Future Sciences Versus the Man | Acrylic, oilstick and paper collage on canvas with tied wood supports | 60 × 60in | $12.7 million | Private collection | |
| 1982 | Six Crimee | Acrylic and oil paintstick on Masonite, three panels | 72 × 144 in | N/A | Scott D. F. Spiegel Collection | |
| 1982 | Diagram of the Ankle | Acrylic, oil stick and Xeroxed collage on two hinged canvases | 69 × 120 in | N/A | Yale University Art Gallery | |
| 1982 | Kings of Egypt II | Oil on canvas | 72 1/4 × 72 1/4 in | N/A | Museum Boijmans Van Beuningen | |
| 1982 | Kings of Egypt III | Oil on canvas | 72 1/4 × 72 1/4 in | N/A | Museum Boijmans Van Beuningen | |
| 1982 | 1982–83 | Radium 23 | Acrylic and oilstick on canvas | 94 1/2 × 62 in | $3.6 million (2012) | Private collection |
| Untitled (Pecho/Oreja) | 1982–83 | Acrylic, oil stick and paper collage on canvas | 72 × 72in | $10.6 million (2013) | Private collection | |
| Flesh and Spirit | 1982–83 | Oil stick, gesso, acrylic and paper on canvas | 145 × 145 in | $30.7 million (2018) | Private collection | |
| 1983 | Untitled (Halloween) | Acrylic and oilstick on canvas | 83 1/4 × 59 3/4 in | $4.2 million (2017) | Private collection | |
| 1983 | In This Case | Acrylic and oilstick on canvas | 77 7/8 × 73 3/4 in | $93.1 million (2021) | Private collection | |
| 1983 | Masonic Lodge | Acrylic and oilstick on canvas | 86 1/4 × 78 in | $5 million (2008) | Private collection | |
| 1983 | Infantry | Acrylic on canvas | 65 × 90 3/4 in | $6 million (2016) | Private collection | |
| 1983 | Robot Man | Oilstick on paper | 22 1/4 × 30 1/8 in | $3.8 million (2019) | Private collection | |
| 1983 | Onion Gum | Acrylic and oilstick on canvas | 78 1/4 × 80 in | $7.4 million (2012) | Private collection | |
| 1983 | Swiss House on Fire | Acrylic and marker on canvas | 19 5/8 × 27 5/8 in | $2.2 million (2015) | Private collection | |
| 1983 | Batman | Oilstick on paper | 22 × 29 7/8 in | $1.8 million (2021) | Private collection | |
| 1983 | Five Fish Species | Acrylic and oilstick on canvas mounted on wood supports | 66 7/8 × 140 1/2 in | $7.7 million (2013) | Jose Mugrabi | |
| 1983 | Untitled | Acrylic and oilstick on canvas in 3 parts | 96 × 71 1/4 in | $8.3 million (2017) | Private collection | |
| 1983 | Untitled | Oilstick on paper | 42 1/2 × 30 1/4 in | $7.4 million (2014) | Private collection | |
| 1983 | Brother's Sausage | Acrylic, oilstick and paper collage on canvas | 48 × 187 1/2 in | $18.7 million (2016) | Private collection | |
| 1983 | Self-Portrait | Oil, acrylic, oilstick, graphite and pen on wood in 2 parts | 79 5/8 × 29 3/4 in 96 3/4 × 34 in | $9.5 million (2019) | Private collection | |
| 1983 | Blue Heads | Acrylic and oilstick on canvas | 72 × 117 in | $10.8 million (2013) | Private collection | |
| 1983 | Museum Security (Broadway Meltdown) | Acrylic, oilstick and paper collage on canvas | 84 × 84 in | $14.5 million (2013) | Private collection | |
| 1983 | Discography Two | Acrylic and oilstick on canvas | 66 1/8 × 60 1/8 in | $20.9 million (2018) | Private collection | |
| 1983 | Catharsis | Acrylic and oilstick on canvas—triptych | 72 × 93 3/4 in | $4.3 million (2011) | Private collection | |
| 1983 | Action Comics One | Acrylic, colored pencil and oilstick on canvas | 66 1/8 × 60 1/4 in | $6.9 million (2023) | Private collection | |
| 1983 | Notary | Acrylic, oilstick and paper collage on canvas mounted on wood supports, triptych | 71 × 158 in | N/A | Schorr Family Collection | |
| 1983 | Molasses | Acrylic, and oilstick on canvas | 60 × 84 in | N/A | Galerie Bruno Bischofberger | |
| 1983 | Mona Lisa | Acrylic and oil crayon on canvas | 66.7 × 60.8 in | N/A | Private collection | |
| 1983 | With Strings Two | Acrylic, and oilstick on canvas | 96 × 60 in | N/A | The Broad museum | |
| 1983 | Horn Players | Acrylic and oilstick on three canvases mounted on wood supports | 96 × 75 in | N/A | The Broad museum | |
| 1983 | Eyes and Eggs (Joe) | Acrylic, oilstick and paper collage on canvas with metal hinges | 119 × 97 in | N/A | The Broad museum | |
| 1983 | Natives Carrying Things | Acrylic and oilstick on canvas | 84 × 84 in | $4 million (2019) | Private collection | |
| 1983 | Hollywood Africans | Acrylic and oil stick on canvas | 84 × 84 in | N/A | The Whitney | |
| 1983 | Defacement (The Death of Michael Stewart) | Acrylic and marker on wood | 25 × 30 1/2 in | N/A | Nina Clemente | |
| 1983 | El Gran Espectaculo (The Nile) | Acrylic and oilstick on canvas mounted on wooden supports, in three parts | 68 × 141 in | $67.1 million (2023) | Private Collection | |
| 1983 | In Italian | Acrylic, oil paintstick, and marker on wood supports | 88 1/2 × 80 in | N/A | Brant Foundation | |
| 1983 | Justcome Suit | Acrylic, oilstick and coloured Xerox collage on canvas | 40 1/2 × 79 1/8 in | $6.6 million (2020) | Private collection | |
| 1983 | Danny Rosen | Acrylic, oilstick and paper collage on canvas with wood supports | 89 1/4 × 50 1/2 in | $4.9 million (2013) | Private collection | |
| 1983 | Job Analisis | Acrylic and oilstick on canvas | 55 3/4 × 74 in | $3.7 million (2015) | Private collection | |
| 1983 | Untitled (Bracco di Ferro) | Acrylic and oilstick on canvas with wood supports | 72 × 72 in | $5 million (2013) | Private collection | |
| 1983 | Flash in Naples | Acrylic, oil and oilstick on canvas | 66 1/8 × 60 3/8 in | $19.8 million (2021) | Private collection | |
| 1983 | Do Not Revenge | Acrylic and oilstick on canvas | 52 × 84 in | $9.2 million (2014) | Private collection | |
| 1983 | Undiscovered Genius of the Mississippi Delta | Acrylic, oilstick and paper collage on five joined canvases | 49 × 185 1/2 in | $23.7 million (2014) | Private collection | |
| 1983 | Untitled (Stardust) | Acrylic and oilstick on canvas | 84 × 52 in | $7.2 million (2010) | Private collection | |
| 1983–84 | Untitled (Soap) | Acrylic, oilstick, metallic paint and Xerox collage on canvas | 66 × 60 in | $13.1 million (2021) | Private collection | |
| 1984 | Sabado por la Noche (Saturday Night) | Acrylic, silkscreen, oil stick and paper collage on canvas | 77 × 88 in | $10.7 million (2019) | Private collection | |
| 1984 | Remote Commander | Acrylic and Xerox collage on canvas | 66 × 60 in | $3.9 million (2017) | Private collection | |
| 1984 | Pink Elephant with Fire Engine | Acrylic, oil and silkscreen on canvas | 42 1/8 × 36 in | $3.3 million (2019) | Private collection | |
| 1984 | Bird as Buddha | Acrylic and oilstick on canvas | 62 7/8 × 60 in | $3.3 million (2018) | Private collection | |
| 1984 | Ancient Scientist | Acrylic, oilstick, Xerox and paper collage on canvas | 66 × 60 5/8 in | $7.5 million (2020) | Private collection | |
| 1984 | Melting Point of Ice | Acrylic, oilstick and silkscreen | 86 × 68 in | N/A | The Broad museum | |
| 1984 | Gold Griot | Acrylic and oilstick on wood | 117 × 73 in | N/A | The Broad museum | |
| 1984 | Pink Devil | Acrylic, oilstick, and Xerox collage on canvas | 66 × 60 in | N/A | The Broad museum | |
| 1984 | Deaf | Acrylic and oilstick on canvas | 66 × 60 in | N/A | The Broad museum | |
| 1984 | Everything Must Go | Acrylic and oil crayon on canvas | 100 × 114 in | $250,000 (1992) | Liu Luanxiong | |
| 1984 | Untitled | Acrylic on canvas | 72 1/8 × 48 1/8 in | $8 million (2021) | Private collection | |
| 1984 | Air Power | Acrylic and oilstick on canvas | 66 × 60 1/4 in | $8.8 million (2016) | Private collection | |
| 1984 | Untitled | Acrylic, spraypaint and paper collage on canvas | 41 3/8 × 41 3/8 in | $2.9 million (2016) | Private collection | |
| 1984 | Water-Worshipper | Acrylic, oilstick, silkscreen ink and metal on panel | 82 1/2 × 108 in | $5.4 million (2017) | Private collection | |
| 1984 | Campaign | Acrylic, oilstick and silkscreen ink on canvas | 85 7/8 × 68 1/8 in | $6.7 million (2015) | Private collection | |
| 1984 | Three Pontificators | Acrylic and oilstick on canvas | 60 × 60 in | $3.3 million (2013) | Private collection | |
| 1984 | Flexible | Acrylic and oilstick on wood | 102 × 75 in | $45.3 million (2018) | Private collection | |
| 1984 | Untitled (Pablo Picasso) | Acrylic and oilstick on metal | 35 5/8 × 35 5/8 in | $8.2 million (2023) (Note: Sold for GBP 6,462,500 in London) | Private collection | |
| 1984 | Pre-Agrav | Acrylic on canvas | 65 3/4 × 59 7/8 in | $6.7 million (2013) | Private collection | |
| 1984 | Logo | Acrylic, oilstick and silkscreen on canvas | 60 1/4 × 48 in | $3.7 million (2018) | Private collection | |
| 1984 | MP | Acrylic and Xerox collage on canvas | 86 × 68 in | $4.5 million (2020) | Private collection | |
| 1984 | Orange Joy | Acrylic and oilstick on canvas | 78 1/2 × 62 3/8 in | $4.7 million | Private collection | |
| 1984 | Big Joy | Acrylic, oilstick and Xerox collage on canvas | 86 × 67 7/8 in | $4.1 million (2012) | Private collection | |
| 1984 | Ero | Acrylic, oilstick and Xerox collage on canvas | 86 × 98 in | $3.3 million (2018) | Private collection | |
| 1984 | Gas Truck | Acrylic and oilstick on canvas—triptych | 50 × 169 in | $4.6 million (2011) | Private collection | |
| 1984 | Spike | Acrylic and oilstick on canvas | 61 × 65 in | $1.9 million (2011) | Private collection | |
| 1984 | Big Sun | Acrylic and oilsticks on canvas | 66 × 60 in | $1.1 million (2010) | Private collection | |
| 1984 | Grillo | Oil, acrylic, oilstick, Xerox collage and nails on 4 wood panels | 96 × 211 1/2 in | $8.8 million (2007) | Private collection | |
| 1984 | Pyro | Acrylic, silkscreen ink and oil stick on canvas | 86 1/4 × 68 in | $12.2 million (2019) | Private collection | |
| 1984 | Untitled (The Door) | Acrylic, oil and Xerox collage on wooden door | 81 1/2 × 33 1/4 in | $8.5 million (2021) | Private collection | |
| 1984 | Big Snow | Acrylic and oilstick on canvas | 66 1/4 × 60 1/8 in | N/A | Private collection | |
| 1985 | Sam F | Oil paint on door | 80 × 36 in | N/A | Dallas Museum of Art | |
| 1985 | Untitled | Acrylic and oilstick on wood, in three parts | 85 1/2 × 108 1/2 in | $37.2 million (2021) | Private collection | |
| 1985 | Rubber | Acrylic, oil stick and collage on canvas | 86 × 68 in | $9.7 million (2020) | Private collection | |
| 1985 | Elaine | Acrylic, oilstick and Xerox collage on canvas | 86 × 68 in | $5.9 million (2017) | Private collection | |
| 1985 | Peter and the Wolf | Acrylic, oilstick and paper collage on canvas | 100 × 113 5/8 in | $5.7 million (2014) | Private collection | |
| 1985 | Tenor | Acrylic, oilstick and paper collage on canvas | 100 × 114in | $7.1 million (2014) | Private collection | |
| 1985 | Antar | Acrylic and oilstick on canvas | 78 3/4 × 110 1/4 in | $3.5 million (2017) | Private collection | |
| 1985 | Glenn | Acrylic, oilstick and xerox collage on canvas | 100 × 114 in | $1.4 million (2004) | Private collection | |
| 1985 | Thermopolae | Enamel, acrylic, wax crayon on wood | 86 × 52 7/8 in | $3.9 million (2019) | Private collection | |
| 1985 | To Repel Ghosts | Acrylic, oil, oilstick and Xerox collage on woo | 83 3/4 × 35 3/4 × 12 1/2 in | $7.8 million (2022) | Private collection | |
| 1985 | Sterno | Acrylic on canvas | 120 × 102 cm | N/A | Barcelona Museum of Contemporary Art | |
| 1985–86 | REOK | Acrylic and oilstick on canvas | 120 × 80 1/4 in | $2.1 million (2011) | Private collection | |
| 1986 | Apex | Acrylic, oilstick and Xerox collage on canvas | 67.9 × 86 in | $10.8 million (2019) | Private collection | |
| 1986 | Thin in the Old | Acrylic, oil and Xerox collage on panel | 71 7/8 × 42 1/8 in | $4.3 million (2017) | Private collection | |
| 1986 | Untitled | Acrylic on canvas | 59 1/16 × 47 1/4 in | $3 million (2016) | Private collection | |
| 1986 | Jim Crow | Acrylic and oilstick on wood | 80 7/8 × 96 1/8 in | $17.7 million (2017) | Private collection | |
| 1986 | In the Wings | Acrylic and oilstick on canvas | 59 × 39 1/4 in | $5.9 million (2017) | Private collection | |
| 1986 | Black | Acrylic, oil, graphite, crayon and Xerox on wood | 49 3/4 × 36 1/2 in | $8.1 million (2020) | Private collection | |
| 1986 | Jazz | Acrylic, oil, graphite, crayon and Xerox on wood | 49 1/2 × 36 1/2 in | $6.9 million (2020) | Private collection | |
| 1986 | Because it Hurts the Lungs | Acrylic, oil, oilstick and Xerox collage on wood | 72 × 42 1/8 × 8 3/8 in | $11.3 million (2021) (Note: Sold for £8,227,750 in London) | Private collection | |
| 1986 | Saxophone | Acrylic and oilstick on canvas | 66 × 60 in | $4.3 million (2012) | Maurice Alain Amon | |
| 1986 | Self-Portrait | Acrylic on canvas | 180 × 260 cm | N/A | Barcelona Museum of Contemporary Art | |
| 1986 | King Zulu | Acrylic and oilstick on canvas | 202 × 255 cm | N/A | Barcelona Museum of Contemporary Art | |
| 1987 | Unbreakable | Acrylic on canvas | 98 × 111 3/4 in | $596,500 (1998) | Private collection | |
| 1987 | Untitled | Acrylic, oilstick, and color copy collage on canvas | 100 × 114 in | $2.3 million (2008) | Private collection | |
| 1987 | Despues De Un Puno | Acrylic, oilstick and xerox collage on canvas | 84 × 60 in | N/A | Private collection | |
| 1987 | Untitled (Devil's head) | Acrylic on canvas | 48 × 40 in | $3.6 million (2016) | Private collection | |
| 1987 | Fats II | Acrylic and oilstick on canvas | 112 1/4 × 64 1/4 in | $4.7 million (2017) | Private collection | |
| 1987 | Untitled | Acrylic, oilstick and pencil on canvas | 95.25 × 117.5 in | $8.3 million (2015) | Private collection | |
| 1987 | Victor 25448 | Acrylic, oilstick, wax and crayon on paper laid on canvas | 72 × 131 in | $9.2 million (2020) | Private collection | |
| 1987 | Riddle Me This, Batman | Acrylic and oil paintstick on canvas | 117.2 × 114.2 in | $6.2 million (2010) | Private collection | |
| 1987 | Love Dub for A | Acrylic and oilstick on canvas | 86 × 114 in | $6.9 million (2014) | Jose Mugrabi | |
| 1987 | Untitled | Acrylic, oilstick, graphite, paper collage and crayon on canvas | 93 × 108 in | $5.8 million (2010) | Private collection | |
| 1988 | Untitled | Oilstick and acrylic on wood | 42 1/8 × 36 in | $3.4 million (2018) | Private collection | |
| 1988 | Eroica I | Acrylic and oilstick on paper mounted on canvas | 90 7/8 × 88 3/4 in | $5.9 million (2011) | Jose Mugrabi | |
| 1988 | Self-portrait | Acrylic on canvas | 47 3/4 × 37 3/4 in | $12.5 million (2021) | Private collection | |
| 1988 | Riding with Death | Acrylic and oil paintstick on canvas | 98 × 114 in | N/A | Private collection | |

== Collaborations with Andy Warhol ==
| Year | Title | Medium | Dimensions | Record price | Owner |
|---|---|---|---|---|---|
| 1984 | Olympics | Acrylic on canvas | 75 7/8 × 122 in | $10.5 million (2012) | Private collection |
| 1984 | Ailing Ali In Fight of Life | Acrylic and oil stick on canvas | 76 × 105 in | N/A | Private collection |
| 1984 | Untitled (Heart Attack) | Acrylic on canvas in two parts | 76.4 × 155.9 in | N/A | Private Collection |
| 1984 | Cops | Acrylic and oil on canvas | 76 7/8 × 117 5/8 in | $2.4 million (2013) | Private collection |
| 1984 | Wood | Oil, wax crayon, acrylic and silkscreen ink on canvas | 82 × 108 in | $2.4 million (2016) | Private collection |
| 1984 | Untitled | Acrylic, oil, and screen print on canvas | 116 × 165 1/4 in | $2.7 million (2010) | Private collection |
| 1984 | Untitled | Acrylic on canvas | 75 × 105 in | N/A | Heidi Horten |
| 1984–85 | Bananas | Acrylic, silkscreen ink and oilstick on canvas | 87 3/4 × 81 3/8 in | $4.3 million (2021) | Private collection |
| 1984–85 | Taxi, 45th/Broadway | Acrylic, oilstick, and silkscreen ink on canvas | 77 1/4 × 107 1/4 in | $9.4 million (2018) | Private collection |
| 1984–85 | Felix the Cat | Acrylic on canvas | 115 3/4 × 160 in | $512,000 (2001) | Private collection |
| 1984–85 | Sweet Pungent | Acrylic, oilstick and silkscreen ink on canvas | 96 1/4 × 81 1/8 in | $5.7 million (2017) | Private collection |
| 1984–85 | Untitled (Collaboration #23) | Acrylic and oilstick on canvas | 113 × 102 1/4 in | $1.7 million (2021) | Private collection |
| 1985 | Clearboy | Acrylic and silkscreen print on canvas | | N/A | Private collection |
| 1985 | Zenith | Acrylic on canvas | 116 7/8 × 264 7/8 in | $11.4 million (2014) | Private collection |
| 1985 | Eggs | Acrylic on canvas | 80 × 111.4 in | N/A | Private collection |
| 1985 | Arm and Hammer II | Acrylic, oilstick, and silkscreen on canvas | 65 3/4 × 112 1/4 in | N/A | Private collection |
| 1985 | New Flame | Acrylic, oilstick and silkscreen ink on canvas | 79 1/8 × 106 1/8 in | $3 million (2017) | Private collection |
| 1985 | Third Eye | Acrylic on canvas | 80 3/4 × 128 3/ in | $7 million (2011) | Private collection |
| 1985 | Keep Frozen (General Electric) | Acrylic and silkscreen on canvas | 95 × 80 in | $2.1 million (2017) (Note: This sold for £1.8 million in 2017. The USD amount was converted in 2020.) | Private collection |
| 1985 | Paramount Pictures | Synthetic polymer, silkscreen inks and paint tube collage on canvas | 48 × 48 in | $2.7 million (2017) | Private collection |

== Collaborations with Andy Warhol and Francesco Clemente ==
| Year | Title | Medium | Owner |
|---|---|---|---|
| 1984 | Pure | Acrylic on canvas | Private collection |
| 1984 | Premonition | Acrylic on canvas | Private collection |
| 1984 | Pole Star | Acrylic on canvas | Private collection |
| 1984 | Pimple Head | Acrylic on canvas | Private collection |
| 1984 | Horizontal Painting | Acrylic on canvas | Contemporary Art Center of Málaga |
