= Olympics (Basquiat and Warhol) =

Painting by Jean-Michel Basquiat and Andy Warhol

- Artist: Jean-Michel Basquiat and Andy Warhol
- Year: 1984
- Medium: Acrylic on canvas
- Movement: Neo-expressionism and pop art
- Dimensions: 192.72 cm × 310 cm (75.875 in × 122 in)
- Location: Private collection

Olympics is a painting created by American artists Jean-Michel Basquiat and Andy Warhol in 1984. The artwork was a commemoration of the 1984 Summer Olympics. It sold for $10.5 million at Phillips's Contemporary Art Evening Sale in June 2012, which at the time was a record high for a Warhol-Basquiat collaboration. It is the second most expensive Warhol-Basquiat collaboration sold at auction after Zenith (1985).

== Background ==
Andy Warhol rose to prominence as the leading artist of the 1960s Pop art movement. He ventured into a variety of art forms, including filmmaking, photography, and writing. Controversially blurring the lines between fine art and mainstream aesthetics made him the most famous artist America had ever produced, but by the late 1970s his popularity had waned. He had a resurgence of success in the 1980s, partially due to his affiliation with a number of prolific younger artists, who were dominating the 1980s New York art scene.

Jean-Michel Basquiat started out as a street artist under the moniker SAMO. He also ventured into music, forming the experimental band Gray. In 1979, he began creating sculptures, mixed media works, and selling clothes that he painted on. Basquiat idolized Warhol and was ecstatic when he sold him a postcard at a restaurant in 1979. They were later formally introduced by Swiss art dealer Bruno Bischofberger in October 1982. By that time, Basquiat had become a sensation in the art world for his neo-expressionist paintings. Upon meeting, Warhol took polaroid photos of Basquiat, and Basquiat made Warhol a portrait titled Dos Cabezas (1982). They soon became close friends and began collaborating on paintings together. The collaborations began in 1983 when Bischofberger decided to commission work from three of his artists: Warhol, Basquiat and Italian artist Francesco Clemente, though eventually it became a two-way collaboration between only Warhol and Basquiat a year later.

After many years of silkscreen and oxidation, Warhol returned to painting with a brush in hand in a series of large collaborative works with Basquiat over a span of two years. Their relationship became increasingly strained, culminating in September 1985, when their joint exhibit Warhol and Basquiat: Paintings opened at the Tony Shafrazi Gallery in SoHo to mostly negative reviews. Basquiat was upset when he was called Warhol's accessory. When Warhol died following gallbladder surgery in 1987, Basquiat was swamped by grief and guilt. He died the following year from a heroin overdose.

== Analysis ==
When they collaborated, Warhol usually started the process by providing the basis and then Basquiat would add his input. Basquiat recalled in his interview with Davis and Johnston: "[Warhol] would put something very concrete or recognizable, like a newspaper headline or a product logo, and then I would sort of deface it." Warhol made the five-ring Olympic symbols rendered in the original primary colors and Basquiat painted heads over it in his animated style.

== Exhibitions ==
Olympics has been exhibited at major art institutions worldwide, which include:

- Collaborations – Warhol/Basquiat/Clemente at Fridericianum in Kassel, Germany, February–May 1996; Villa Stuck in Munich, Germany, July–September 1996; Museo d'Arte Contemporanea, Castello di Rivoli, in Italy, October 1996–January 1997.
- Andy Warhol and His World at Louisiana Museum of Modern Art in Humlebæk, Denmark, April–July 2000.
- Warhol, Basquiat, Clemente: Obras En Colaboracion at Museo Nacional Centro de Arte Reina Sofía in Madrid, Spain, February–April 2002.
- The Andy Warhol Show at Fondazione La Triennale di Milano in Italy, September 2004–January 2005.
- Ménage à trois: Warhol, Basquiat, Clemente at Bundeskunsthalle in Bonn, Germany, February–May 2012.

== See also ==
- List of paintings by Jean-Michel Basquiat
- 1984 in art
