= The Field Next to the Other Road =

1981 painting by Jean-Michel Basquiat

- Artist: Jean-Michel Basquiat
- Year: 1981
- Medium: Acrylic, enamel spray paint, oilstick, metallic paint and ink on canvas
- Movement: Neo-expressionism
- Dimensions: 220.9 cm × 401.3 cm (87.0 in × 158.0 in)
- Location: Private collection

The Field Next to the Other Road is a 1981 painting created by American artist Jean-Michel Basquiat. It sold for $37.1 million at Christie's in May 2015.

== History ==
The Field Next to the Other Road was executed in 1981, an important year in Basquiat's career, in which he made the transition from a street artist to an established gallery artist in New York's downtown art scene. Basquiat was invited to Modena, Italy by art dealer Emilio Mazzoli after he saw his work at New York's MoMA PS1 in February 1981. In Modena, Basquiat commenced a series of paintings for his first solo exhibition at Galleria d'Arte Emilio Mazzoli in May 1981. Among the paintings created was The Field Next to the Other Road, a depiction of a skeletal man walking a cow.

In May 2015, the painting sold for $37.1 million at Christie's Post-War and Contemporary Art Evening Sale in New York. In December 2015, the painting was still owned by the consignor, art dealer Tony Shafrazi. In February 2016, Christie's sued art dealer Jose Mugrabi, and Mugrabi family firm, the Jombihis Corporation, for $32.1 million (plus interest and fees). Jose Mugrabi had bid on a client's behalf when he won the painting, but the client backed out of the sale and the Mugrabis missed two deadlines to pay the remaining balance. Christie's and the Mugrabis reached an amicable settlement in March 2016—with Mugrabi taking ownership of the painting and agreeing to pay his bill in full.

== Exhibitions ==
The Field Next to the Other Road has been exhibited at major art institutions worldwide, which include:

- SAMO at Galleria d'Arte Emilio Mazzoli in Modena, May–June 1981.
- Jean-Michel Basquiat at Galleria Mario Diacono in Rome, October–November 1982.
- Jean-Michel Basquiat: A Tribute, Important Paintings, Drawings & Objects at Tony Shafrazi Gallery in New York, September–November 1996.
- Jean-Michel Basquiat at Tony Shafrazi Gallery in New York, April–June 1998.
- Jean-Michel Basquiat at Tony Shafrazi Gallery in New York, October–November 1999.
- Picasso Bacon Basquiat at Tony Shafrazi Gallery in New York, May–July 2004.
- Dubuffet / Basquiat, Personal Histories at Pace Wildenstein in New York, April–June 2006.
- The Jean-Michel Basquiat Show at Fondazione La Triennale di Milano in Milan, September 2006–January 2007.
- Four Friends at Tony Shafrazi Gallery in New York, October 2007–February 2008.
- Basquiat at Fondation Beyeler in Switzerland, May–September 2010; Musée d'Art Moderne de la Ville de Paris, October 2010–January 2011.

== See also ==
- List of paintings by Jean-Michel Basquiat
