= In This Case =

1983 painting by Jean-Michel Basquiat

- Artist: Jean-Michel Basquiat
- Year: 1983
- Medium: Acrylic and oilstick on canvas
- Movement: Neo-expressionism
- Dimensions: 197.8 cm × 187.3 cm (77 7/8 in × 73 3/4 in)
- Location: Private collection

In This Case is a painting created by American artist Jean-Michel Basquiat in 1983. The artwork, which depicts a skull, is among the most expensive paintings ever purchased. In May 2021, it sold for $93.1 million at Christie's New York, the second highest auction record by Basquiat.

== History ==
By the time Jean-Michel Basquiat executed In This Case at the age of 22 in 1983, he was already internationally acclaimed for his neo-expressionism paintings. The six-by-six-foot work on canvas depicts a "large skull head set against a ruby-red background, with a blazing eye, protruding green teeth, and fractured anatomy." Art historian Robert Farris Thompson described the work as "one of Basquiat’s strongest...a climactic portrait of the black face that haunts painting after painting. Every creative touch—the green teeth, the yellow eye, the navy-blue skin—is exactly right." Depictions of human anatomy are prevalent throughout Basquiat's oeuvre, rooting from his childhood when his mother gave him a copy of Gray's Anatomy while he recuperated from a car accident. "What drew Basquiat almost obsessively to the depiction of the human head was his fascination with the face as a passageway from exterior physical presence into the hidden realities of man’s psychological and mental realms," wrote art historian Fred Hoffman.

In This Case is the last in a series of large skull paintings made between 1981 and 1983. The first, Untitled (Skull) (1981) was acquired by Eli and Edythe Broad the year after it was painted and is now housed at The Broad museum in Los Angeles. The second, Untitled (1982) was sold for $110.5 million at Sotheby's in 2017, the highest price paid for an American artist at auction. In 2018, a Basquiat retrospective opened at the Louis Vuitton Foundation in Paris featuring the trinity of skull paintings. "What situates these canvases among his most arresting is the violence they bring to their upending of the vanitas. Listed Untitled, the first two are sometimes dubbed Skull, while the third is titled In This Case; these cranial anatomies are not memento mori, but amplified memories played very, very loud. So loud that their presence is indisputable," explained co-curator Olivier Michelon.

In May 2021, In This Case was sold at Christie's 21st-century art auction for $93.1 million, which far exceeded the pre-sale estimate of $50 million. The seller was Italian businessman Giancarlo Giammetti, co-founder of the fashion house Valentino. The work of art was photographed in the dining room of his Manhattan apartment for a 2013 Architectural Digest spread. Giammetti purchased the painting from Gagosian in 2007, which was previously sold for $999,500 at Sotheby's in 2002.

== Exhibitions ==
In This Case has been exhibited at the following art institutions:

- Jean-Michel Basquiat at Museo d'Arte Moderna della Città di Lugano, Villa Malpensata in Lugano, March–June 2005.
- The Jean-Michel Basquiat Show at Fondazione La Triennale di Milano in Milan, September 2006–January 2007.
- Jean-Michel Basquiat at Gagosian Gallery in New York, February–April 2013.
- Jean-Michel Basquiat at Fondation Louis Vuitton in Paris, October 2018–January 2019.

== See also ==
- List of paintings by Jean-Michel Basquiat
- List of most expensive paintings
- 1983 in art
