= Versus Medici =

1982 painting by Jean-Michel Basquiat

- Artist: Jean-Michel Basquiat
- Year: 1982
- Medium: Acrylic paint, oilstick and paper collage on three joined canvases
- Movement: Neo-expressionism
- Dimensions: 214 cm × 137.9 cm (84 1/4 in × 54 1/4 in)
- Location: Private collection

Versus Medici is a painting created by American artist Jean-Michel Basquiat in 1982. The artwork, which references the Medici family, sold for $50.8 million at Sotheby's in May 2021.

== History ==
In 1980, Jean-Michel Basquiat began shifting from writing graffiti in the streets to becoming a gallery artist. His participated in The Times Square Show in 1980 and New York/New Wave at MoMA PS1 in 1981. In May 1981, Basquiat had his first solo exhibition at Galleria d'Arte Emilio Mazzoli in Modena. In March 1982, he had his first American one-man show at the Annina Nosei Gallery in New York. That same month, he returned to Modena for his second Italian exhibition. In 1982, Basquiat also had solo shows at the Gagosian Gallery in West Hollywood, Galerie Bruno Bischofberger in Zurich, and the Fun Gallery in the East Village. He became the youngest artist to ever take part in documenta in 1982, which is considered to be his most coveted year.

Versus Medici was completed in October 1982, when Basquiat was 21 years old. Basquiat's former studio assistant Stephen Torton reflected to Sotheby's that during his employment, summer of 1982 to summer 1983, Basquiat was "into the Renaissance." His fascination with artists such as Leonardo da Vinci and Michelangelo is a central theme in his some of famous works from this period, including Leonardo da Vinci's Greatest Hits (1982) and Florence (1983). Versus Medici "is among Basquiat’s most forceful visual challenges to the Western art establishment, in which the young artist boldly crowns himself successor to the artistic throne as established by the masters of the Italian Renaissance." When asked about the inspiration for the work, Torton recalled that Basquiat was particularly interested in the Dominican friar Girolamo Savonarola, who became the sole leader of Florence after overthrowing the ruling Medici family in 1494. "I've wondered if this painting isn't a portrait of Savonarola. It was Savonarola who was truly versus the Medici," said Torton. Basquiat depicted Savonarola in the painting Toussaint L'Overture Versus Savonarola (1983).

The artwork was previously in the collection of Stephane Janssen, an early collector of Basquiat who acquired it from Larry Gagosian on a visit to Basquiat's studio in 1982. It then remained in a distinguished private collection from 1990 until it was auctioned at Sotheby's New York contemporary art sale, where it sold for $50.8 million in May 2021.

== Exhibitions ==
The painting has been exhibited at the following art institutions:

- Jean-Michel Basquiat: Histoire d'une oeuvre (The Work of a Lifetime) at Fondation Dina Vierny-Musée Maillol in Paris, June–October 2003.
- Jean-Michel Basquiat at Museo d'Arte Moderna della Città di Lugano, Villa Malpensata in Lugano, March–June 2005.
- The Jean-Michel Basquiat Show: 2006-2007 at Fondazione la Triennale di Milano in Milan, September 2006–January 2007.
- Ménage à trois: Warhol, Basquiat, Clemente at Bundeskunsthalle in Bonn, February–May 2012.
- Intuition at Palazzo Fortuny in Venice, May–November 2017.
- Jean-Michel Basquiat: Made in Japan at Mori Arts Center Gallery in Tokyo, September–November 2019.

== See also ==
- List of paintings by Jean-Michel Basquiat
- 1982 in art
