= Untitled (Head) =

1982 drawing by Jean-Michel Basquiat

- Artist: Jean-Michel Basquiat
- Year: 1982
- Medium: Oilstick, ink and acrylic on paper
- Movement: Neo-expressionism
- Dimensions: 75.6 cm × 55.9 cm (29.75 in × 22.0 in)
- Location: Private collection

Untitled (Head) is a 1982 drawing created by American artist Jean-Michel Basquiat in 1982. It sold for $15.2 million at Sotheby's in June 2020, becoming Basquiat's most expensive work on paper.

== History ==
Executed in 1982, Untitled (Head) is an outburst of vivid color, bearing echoes to one of Basquiat's most well-known heads, Untitled (1981). "Whereas Untitled (1981) presents the viewer with a mask-like visage caught somewhere between life and death, Untitled (Head) (1982) creates an effect that’s somewhat more supernatural because of its evocatively unnatural hues." Reminiscent of an African mask, the drawing was created during a period when Basquiat was being recognized by the establishment for the first time after his "shift from street to studio." Grégoire Billault, Head of Sotheby's Contemporary Art Department in New York, said in a statement, "Untitled (Head) encapsulates the very best of Basquiat’s brilliant career. There is a sense of urgency and immediacy in this painting that is truly exceptional—a prescient work that captures and defines 1980s New York, demonstrating the young artist’s profound psychological awareness."

Heads and skulls are some of Basquiat's most sought after works. Art historian Fred Hoffman analyzed the use of heads as a motif in Basquiat's oeuvre: "What drew Basquiat almost obsessively to the depiction of the human head was his fascination with the face as a passageway from exterior physical presence into the hidden realities of man’s psychological and mental realms…they not only peer out as if seeing, but also invite the viewer to penetrate within."

In June 2020, the painting sold for $15.2 million at Sotheby's Contemporary Art Evening Auction, a new auction record for a Basquiat work on paper. It was also the Sotheby's highest price ever for a work sold to an online bidder.

== Exhibitions ==
The painting has been exhibited at the flowing art institutions:

- Jean Michel Basquiat Drawings at Robert Miller Gallery in New York, November 1990.
- Basquiat at Fondation Beyeler in Basel, May–September 2010.
- Jean-Michel Basquiat at the Brant Foundation in New York, March–May 2019.

== See also ==
- List of paintings by Jean-Michel Basquiat
