= Irony of Negro Policeman =

1981 painting by Jean-Michel Basquiat

- Artist: Jean-Michel Basquiat
- Year: 1981
- Medium: Acrylic and oilstick on wood
- Movement: Neo-expressionism
- Dimensions: 122 cm × 183 cm (48 in × 72 in)
- Location: Private collection

Irony of Negro Policeman is a painting created by American artist Jean-Michel Basquiat in 1981. It depicts a black figure as a police officer.

== History ==
By 1981, Jean-Michel Basquiat made the transition from street artist to a gallery artist. Basquiat joined the Annina Nosei Gallery in New York, and Nosei provided him with studio space in the basement of her gallery where he created some of his most important artworks such as Irony of a Negro Policeman. The painting sold for $12.6 million at a Phillips Contemporary Art auction in 2012.

== Analysis ==
The figure in the artwork—a black man dressed in a midnight blue police uniform—represents the totalitarian black mass. The hat that frames the head of the policeman resembles a cage, and represents what Basquiat believed are the constrained independent perceptions of African-Americans at the time, and how constrained the policeman's own perceptions were within white society. Basquiat drew upon his Haitian heritage by painting a hat that resembles the top hat associated with Baron Samedi of the Gede family of lwa, who embody the powers of death in Haitian Vodou. Art historian Alayo Akinkugbe also characterized the top hat as a symbol of capitalism and the upper class.

Race was one of the most important themes in Basquiat's oeuvre. He consistently placed the black figure at the center of his artwork because, as he stated: "Black people are never really portrayed realistically in...I mean, not even portrayed in modern art enough." However, by titling the artwork "IRONY OF NEGRO PLCEMN" next to the figure, Basquiat is suggesting irony in that the oppressed is wearing the uniform of the oppressor. Author Jana Evans Braziel noted: The elided vowels in the word "policeman" (painted onto the wood panel as "PLCEMN") suggest that the "Negro Policeman" is merely a placement: a position or cog within the machine; as a placement, there can also be a replacement: to the system, he is expendable.

Irony of a Negro Policeman was painted the same year Basquiat created La Hara (1981), a menacing depiction of a white policeman. However the contrast of intimidation are opposites. The black officer in Irony of a Negro Policeman is outlined in white with a mask-like face, symbolizing hypocrisy, whereas La Hara's cryptic message is conveyed with brutal-looking skeleton of a white officer.

Eileen Knott of the Montgomery Museum of Fine Arts wrote that "the very title of the painting urges blacks to consider the implications of black law enforcement in a white dominated society."

South African philosopher Mogobe Ramose emphasized the nuance of the painting, writing that it was "no more a simplistic Afrocentric poster than Himes' detective novels are simply complicit or seditious." He suggested that Irony of Negro Policeman was a "challenge to the idea that there exists a non-complicit ground in which to stand."

== Exhibitions ==
Irony of a Negro Policeman has been exhibited at major art institutions worldwide, which include:

- Jean-Michel Basquiat at Whitney Museum of American Art in New York, October 1992–February 1993; The Menil Collection in Houston, March–May 1993; Des Moines Art Center in Iowa, May–August 1993; Montgomery Museum of Fine Arts in Alabama, November 1993–January 1994.
- Basquiat at the Brooklyn Museum in New York, March 11–June 2005; Museum of Contemporary Art, Los Angeles, July–October 2005; Museum of Fine Arts, Houston, November 2005–February 2006.
- Basquiat at Fondation Beyeler in Switzerland, May–September 2010; Musée d'Art Moderne de la Ville de Paris, October 2010–January 2011.
- Basquiat's 'Defacement': The Untold Story at Guggenheim Museum in New York, June–November 2019.
- Jean-Michael Basquiat: Now's the time at the Art Gallery of Ontario, February 7–May 10 2015.

== See also ==
- List of paintings by Jean-Michel Basquiat
- 1981 in art
