= Donut Revenge =

1982 painting by Jean-Michel Basquiat

- Artist: Jean-Michel Basquiat
- Year: 1982
- Medium: Acrylic, oilstick, and paper collage on canvas
- Movement: Neo-expressionism
- Dimensions: 243.2 cm × 182.2 cm (95 3/4 in × 71 3/4 in)
- Location: Private collection

Donut Revenge is a painting created by American artist Jean-Michel Basquiat in 1982. The artwork, which features a radiant rotund figure, sold for $20.9 million at Christie's in December 2021.

== History ==
Basquiat executed Donut Revenge in his studio beneath Annina Nosei's gallery during the pinnacle of his career in 1982. The painting features a crowned central character floating amid a background of vibrant color. The goggle-eyes and bulbous body creates a humorous impression, heightened by the words "Little Fat Man with a Chicken Leg" written across its chest.

Donut Revenge sold for $90,500 at Christie's New York in May 1995. The painting failed to sell at Sotheby's Contemporary Art auction in November 2004, it had an estimate of $1.2 to $1.8 million. In December 2021, it sold for $20.9 million at Christie's 20th and 21st Century Art Evening Sale in Hong Kong.

== Exhibitions ==
Donut Revenge has been exhibited at the following art institutions:

- Basquiat Paintings at Gallery Schlesinger in New York, November 1988.
- Beautiful Losers at Contemporary Arts Center in Cincinnati; Yerba Buena Center for the Arts in Santa Barbara, March – October 2004.
- Jean-Michel Basquiat: Made in Japan at Mori Arts Center Gallery in Tokyo, September – November, 2019.

== See also ==
- List of paintings by Jean-Michel Basquiat
- 1982 in art
