= Mecca (Basquiat) =

1982 painting by Jean-Michel Basquiat

- Artist: Jean-Michel Basquiat
- Year: 1982
- Medium: Acrylic paint and oilstick on canvas mounted on wood supports
- Movement: Neo-expressionism
- Dimensions: 177.8 cm × 172.4 cm (70 in × 68 7/8 in)
- Owner: Jay-Z

Mecca is a painting created by American artist Jean-Michel Basquiat in 1982. In November 2013, it sold for $4.5 million at Sotheby's.

== History ==
Mecca was executed by Jean-Michel Basquiat in 1982, Basquiat's most valuable year. The painting depicts the Empire State Building with an orange and black and white color with Basquiat's trademark crown, with a banner displaying the word "EMPIRE." The painting was acquired at 1982 by the Gagosian Gallery in Los Angeles.

In June 1998, it was exhibited and shown in at the Tony Shafrazi Gallery in New York.

In November 2013, rapper Jay-Z purchased it for $4.5 million at Sotheby's as an anonymous buyer.

== See also ==
- List of paintings by Jean-Michel Basquiat
