= Untitled (Tar Tar Tar, Lead Lead Lead) =

1981 painting by Jean-Michel Basquiat

- Year: 1981
- Medium: Acrylic, oilstick and metallic spray enamel on canvas
- Movement: Neo-Expressionism
- Dimensions: 172.7 cm × 261.6 cm (68.0 in × 103.0 in)
- Location: Private collection

Untitled (Tar Tar Tar, Lead Lead Lead) is a 1981 painting created by American artist Jean-Michel Basquiat in 1981. It sold for $34.8 million at Christie's in May 2014.

== History ==
Executed in 1981, Untitled depicts a regal warrior surrounded by texts and graffiti imagery that marks his "transcendence from the leading figure on the underground art scene to the established world of international art stardom." The year it was created, Basquiat had his first solo exhibition at Galleria d'Arte Emilio Mazzoli and Annina Nosei became his first art dealer. Describing his aesthetic, she said his paintings "had a quality you don't find on the walls of the street, a quality of poetry and a universal message of the sign. It was a bit immature, but very beautiful." Nosei provided Basquiat with studio space in the basement of her gallery, along with paint and canvases as he worked towards his first American solo show. Maryland art collector Anita Reiner saw the painting while Basquiat was working on it and purchased it on the spot. Reiner died in 2013, and the painting remained in the Reiner Family Collection until her heirs put it up for auction in 2014. It sold for $34.8 million at Christie's Post-War and Contemporary Art Evening Sale in May 2014.

== See also ==
- List of paintings by Jean-Michel Basquiat
- 1981 in art
