= The Guilt of Gold Teeth =

1982 painting by Jean-Michel Basquiat

- Artist: Jean-Michel Basquiat
- Year: 1982
- Medium: Acrylic, spray paint and oilstick on canvas
- Movement: Neo-expressionism
- Dimensions: 240 cm × 421.3 cm (94 1/2 in × 165 7/8 in)
- Location: Private collection

The Guilt of Gold Teeth is a painting created by American artist Jean-Michel Basquiat in 1982. The painting, which depicts Baron Samedi, sold for $40 million at Christie's in November 2021.

== History ==
The Guilt of Gold Teeth was created Jean-Michel Basquiat during his second stay in Modena, Italy, as his star was rapidly ascending. Basquiat had a planned show at Emilio Mazzoli's gallery in Modena in March 1982. Feeling exploited, the show was cancelled because Basquiat was pressured to churn out eight canvases in one week. He severed ties with Mazzoli and his New York dealer Annina Nosei shortly thereafter.

The painting—which measures almost 14 feet across—features Baron Samedi, chief of the Gede family of lwa in Haitian Vodou, responsible for accepting individuals into death and resurrection. The keeper of death's iconography includes a black top hat and long black coat, and his face painted like a skull. Basquiat, whose father was from Haiti, also portrayed Baron Samedi in his 1987 painting Después de un Puño.

The Guilt of Gold Teeth was sold at Sotheby's for $387,500 in 1998. In November 2021, it sold for $40 million at Christie's 21st Century Art Evening Sale in New York.

== See also ==
- List of paintings by Jean-Michel Basquiat
- 1982 in art
