= Sabado por la Noche =

1984 painting by Jean-Michel Basquiat

- English: Saturday Night
- Artist: Jean-Michel Basquiat
- Year: 1984
- Medium: Acrylic, silkscreen, oilstick and paper collage on canvas
- Movement: Neo-expressionism
- Dimensions: 195.6 cm × 223.5 cm (77.0 in × 88.0 in)
- Location: Private collection

Sabado por la Noche (English: Saturday Night) is a painting created by American artist Jean-Michel Basquiat in 1984. It sold for $10.7 million at Christie's in 2019.

== History ==
Born to a Haitian father and Puerto Rican mother, Basquiat grew up in a multilingual household. He was fluent in Spanish and often riffed on the language in his artworks, such as the title of this painting, Sabado por la Noche, which translates to Saturday Night. Basquiat often drew from his Afro-Caribbean roots by relating symbols from his heritage such as "Spanish words and African masks, to the tumultuous experience of modern-day street life."

Sabado por la Noche was executed in 1984, an important period in Basquiat's career. From 1984 to 1985, he was working on collaborative works in silkscreen and paint with pop artist Andy Warhol. Sabado por la Noche is a mix of acrylic, silkscreen, oilstick, and paper collage on canvas. The painting's composition is dominated by two griots, which are featured in several Basquiat artworks from 1984, including Gold Griot, Grillo, and Flexible. A griot is a storyteller, musician, and purveyor of oral history from West African culture.

In his 1986 interview with Demosthenes Davvetas for Libération, Basquiat discussed his use of African imagery: "I've never been to Africa. I'm an artist who has been influenced by his New York environment. But I have a cultural memory. I don't need to look for it; it exists. It’s over there, in Africa. That doesn't mean that I have to go live there. Our cultural memory follows us everywhere, wherever you live." Later that year, he traveled to Abidjan, Ivory Coast for an exhibition organized by Bruno Bischofberger.

In June 2019, the painting sold for $10.7 million at Christie's Post-War and Contemporary Art Evening Auction in London.

== Exhibitions ==
The painting has been exhibited at the following art institutions:

- Jean-Michel Basquiat: Une Rétrospective at Musée Cantini in Marseille, July–September 1992.

== See also ==
- List of paintings by Jean-Michel Basquiat
- 1984 in art
