= Taxi, 45th/Broadway =

Painting by Jean-Michel Basquiat and Andy Warhol

- Artist: Jean-Michel Basquiat and Andy Warhol
- Year: 1984-85
- Medium: Acrylic, oilstick, and silkscreen ink on canvas
- Dimensions: 196.2 cm × 272.4 cm (77.2 in × 107.2 in)
- Location: Private collection

Taxi, 45th/Broadway is a painting created by American artists Jean-Michel Basquiat and Andy Warhol c. 1984–85. The artwork sold at Sotheby's for $9.4 million in November 2018.

== History ==
Andy Warhol and Jean-Michel Basquiat were formally introduced by Swiss art dealer Bruno Bischofberger in 1982. Warhol was a renowned celebrity looking for renewed energy to revitalize his work and Basquiat had achieved recognition for his neo-expressionist paintings. Between 1984 and 1985, they created a series large collaborative works. As summarized by close friend and artist Keith Haring: "The paintings that resulted from this collaboration are the perfect testimony to the depth and importance of their friendship. The quality of the paintings mirrors the quality of the relationship."

Taxi 45th/Broadway depicts a black man labeled "NEGRO" as he unsuccessfully attempts to hail a cab at 45th Street and Broadway. Meanwhile, a white taxi driver ignores him and curses profanities. This scenario was a reality for Basquiat. Despite his meteoric rise from a downtown street artist to a sensation of the New York art scene, he still faced discrimination due to his race. "Being black and a kid and having dreadlocks, he couldn't even get a taxi," Haring said.

Taxi, 45th/Broadway was previously in the collection of fashion designer Gianni Versace, and was auctioned by Sotheby's in London for £478,400 ($872,992) in 2005. In November 2018, it exceeded the pre-sale estimate of $6–$8 million, selling for $9.4 million at Sotheby's Contemporary Art Evening Auction in New York.

== See also ==
- List of paintings by Jean-Michel Basquiat
