= Untitled (One Eyed Man or Xerox Face) =

1982 painting by Jean-Michel Basquiat

- Artist: Jean-Michel Basquiat
- Year: 1982
- Medium: Acrylic, spray paint, oilstick and Xerox collage on panel
- Movement: Neo-expressionism
- Dimensions: 182.9 cm × 121.9 cm (72 in × 48 in)
- Location: Private collection

Untitled (One Eyed Man or Xerox Face) is a painting created by American artist Jean-Michel Basquiat in 1982. In May 2021, it sold for $30.2 million at Christie's in Hong Kong.

== History ==
1982 was a watershed year for Jean-Michel Basquiat. At twenty-one years old, he completed his transition from a graffiti artist to a star of the New York art scene. Basquiat had solo exhibitions in New York, Los Angeles, Rome, Zurich, and Rotterdam. He also received an invitation to documenta 7, where he became the youngest artist to ever participate.

Untitled (One Eyed Man or Xerox Face), from 1982, achieved the highest price for a Xerox work at auction when it sold for $14.5 million at Sotheby's London in March 2017. It has been off the auction block since 1987, when it sold for $23,100 at Sotheby's New York. Two months after Basquiat's Warrior sold for $41.8 million, becoming the most expensive Western artwork sold at auction in Asia, Untitled (One Eyed Man or Xerox Face) sold for $30.2 million at Christie's Hong Kong.

== Analysis ==
Untitled (One Eyed Man or Xerox Face) features a cyclops-like figure in crimson bearing a grin set against a multicolored background. The raised arms echoes the pose of the triumphant boxer. "The hero figures in Basquiat’s paintings refer to the stars of sporting, musical and artistic worlds who, thanks to their extraordinary talents, transcended their social status to become the nation’s icons," said Alex Branczik, Head of Contemporary Art for Sotheby's Europe. "Painted with their arms held aloft and wearing a crown of thorns they also reflect Basquiat’s own dramatic ascent from street artist to gallery sensation, and to his present status as one of the most valuable and talked about artists in the world."

At the center of the painting is the "Xerox face" of the title: Basquiat applied a photocopied sheet of his own drawing to create the figure's face. Basquiat first experimented with Xerox in 1979, when he and his friend Jennifer Stein created a small series of mixed media collages which they photocopied onto postcards that they then sold on the street. To the lower right, Basquiat depicts his famous crown motif.

== Exhibitions ==
The painting has been exhibited at the following institutions:

- Jean-Michel Basquiat: Dipinti at Chiostro del Bramante in Rome, January–March 2002.
- Jean-Michel Basquiat: Ahora es el Momento at Guggenheim Museum in Bilbao, July–November 2015.

== See also ==
- List of paintings by Jean-Michel Basquiat
- 1982 in art
