= Undiscovered Genius of the Mississippi Delta =

1983 painting by Jean-Michel Basquiat

- Artist: Jean-Michel Basquiat
- Medium: Acrylic, oilstick and paper collage on five joined canvases
- Movement: Neo-expressionism
- Dimensions: 120 cm (49 in × 185 1/2 in)
- Location: Private collection

Undiscovered Genius of the Mississippi Delta is a painting created by American artist Jean-Michel Basquiat in 1983. Spanning over 15 feet, the artwork is an assessment of select African American history. The painting sold for $23.7 million at Sotheby's contemporary art evening auction in May 2014.

== Analysis ==
The title, Undiscovered genius of the Mississippi Delta, and the banner at the top of the painting, "THE DEEP SOUTH 1912-1936-1951©" hint at the meaning of the entwined text and images. The words "MISSISSIPPI" and "NEGROES" are each repeated three times in a row, "a sonic echo of insistence and emphasis." As art critic Francesco Pellizzi observed, "His use of words, however, belongs more to the oral traditions of Afro-American cultures—the ecstatic invocations of Voodoo worshipers; the inflamed and inflaming spiritual rhetoric of Baptist preachers with their rousing, recurring, rhythmic juxtapositions of ethical, cosmological, and practical tenets; and, of course, now, black rap…" Another repeated word is "MARK TWAIN," whose book Adventures of Huckleberry Finn is noted for its satire on racism as the protagonist travels along the Mississippi River.

Grégoire Billault, a senior VP at Sotheby's explained the significance of the artwork in an interview with the HuffPost: "By coupling the symbols and phrases most closely associated with the African American story with the abstract expressionist painterly technique in the multi-panel format, Jean-Michel Basquiat created an exceptional masterpiece of history painting."

== Exhibitions ==
Undiscovered genius of the Mississippi Delta has been exhibited at major art institutions worldwide, which include:

- Jean-Michel Basquiat at Vrej Baghoomian Gallery in New York, October–November 1989.
- Jean-Michel Basquiat at Whitney Museum of American Art in New York, October 1992–February 1993; The Menil Collection in Houston, March–May 1993; Des Moines Art Center in Iowa, May–August 1993; Montgomery Museum of Fine Arts in Alabama, November 1993–January 1994.
- Jean-Michel Basquiat at Serpentine Gallery in London, March–April 1996; Palacio Episcopal de Málaga in Spain, May–July 1996.
- Basquiat at the Brooklyn Museum in New York, March 11–June 2005; Museum of Contemporary Art, Los Angeles, July–October 2005; Museum of Fine Arts, Houston, November 2005–February 2006.
- Basquiat at Fondation Beyeler in Switzerland, May–September 2010; Musée d'Art Moderne de la Ville de Paris, October 2010–January 2011.
- Blues for Smoke at Whitney Museum of American Art in New York, February–April 2013; Museum of Contemporary Art, Los Angeles, October 2012–January 2013.
- The painting is listed in the catalogue for the Basquiat and the Bayou exhibit at the Ogden Museum of Southern Art in New Orleans (October 2014–January 2015), but it wasn't included in the installation.

== See also ==
- List of paintings by Jean-Michel Basquiat
