= Untitled (1982 Basquiat skull painting) =

Painting by Jean-Michel Basquiat

- Artist: Jean-Michel Basquiat
- Year: 1982
- Medium: Acrylic, spray paint and oilstick on canvas
- Movement: Neo-expressionism
- Dimensions: 183.2 cm × 173 cm (72 1/8 in × 68 1/8 in)
- Owner: Yusaku Maezawa

Untitled is a painting created by American artist Jean-Michel Basquiat in 1982. The artwork, which depicts a skull, is among the most expensive paintings ever. In May 2017, it sold for $110.5 million at Sotheby's, the highest price ever paid at auction for artwork by an American artist in a public sale. That record was surpassed by Shot Marilyns by Andy Warhol, which sold for $195 million in May 2022.

== History ==
Untitled was executed by Jean-Michel Basquiat in 1982, which is considered his most valuable year. Untitled depicts a skull, composed of black brushstrokes with red, yellow and white rivulets against a blue background. It originally sold for $4,000 in 1982. It was owned by the Annina Nosei Gallery in New York, before being sold to Phoebe Chason, who sold it to Alexander F. Milliken in 1982. It hadn't been shown in public since it was sold at Christie's to Emily and Jerry Spiegel for $19,000 in 1984.

In May 2017, the painting was auctioned at Sotheby's to Japanese businessman and art collector Yusaku Maezawa for $110.5 million, which far exceeded the pre-sale estimate of $60 million. Basquiat, who was 21 years old when he painted Untitled, is the youngest artist to eclipse the $100 million mark. It is also the first work made after 1980 to sell for more than $100 million. It surpassed Andy Warhol's $105 million auction record for Silver Car Crash (Double Disaster) (1963), and became the sixth-most expensive work ever auctioned. Basquiat's previous record was $57.3 million for Untitled (1982), a painting of a devil, also purchased by Maezawa.

== Exhibitions ==
Untitled was exhibited for the group show Fast at Alexander F. Milliken Inc. in New York, June–July 1982. After Yusaku Maezawa purchased the painting, he loaned it to the Brooklyn Museum and the Seattle Art Museum in 2018. Maezawa plans to open a contemporary art museum in his hometown of Chiba, Japan, which will house the painting with the rest of his art collection. It was on display for the Jean-Michel Basquiat exhibition at the Brant Foundation in New York, March–May 2019.

== See also ==
- List of paintings by Jean-Michel Basquiat
- List of most expensive paintings
- 1982 in art
