= Red Skull (Basquiat) =

1982 painting by Jean-Michel Basquiat

- Artist: Jean-Michel Basquiat
- Year: 1982
- Medium: Acrylic, oilstick and paper collage
- Movement: Neo-expressionism
- Dimensions: 152.4 cm × 152.4 cm (60.0 in × 60.0 in)
- Location: Private collection

Red Skull is a painting created by American artist Jean-Michel Basquiat in 1982. It was sold for $21.6 million at Christie's in October 2017.

== History ==
Red Skull was executed in 1982, which is considered Basquiat's most valuable year. His top three most expensive paintings sold at auction all date to 1982. The success of his first American solo exhibit at the Annina Nosei Gallery in March 1982 led to a string of major solo exhibitions internationally.

Like many of his seminal pieces, the focal point of Red Skull is a potent skull. Basquiat's fascination with human anatomy began as a child. While recuperating in hospital after being hit by a car, his mother gave him a copy of Gray's Anatomy, which left a lasting impression on him. Heads and skulls became recurring images in Basquiat's oeuvre. They are vividly evocative of African masks, which cultural reclamation. They also allude to Basquiat's Haitian heritage—specifically Haitian Vodou, which has plenty of skull symbolism.

In October 2017, Red Skull sold for $21.6 million at Christie's Post-War and Contemporary Art Evening Auction in London. A week after the auction, the anonymous consignor of the painting announced that he or she would donate all the proceeds after taxes to the New Jersey chapter of the Knowledge Is Power Program, a nonprofit that helps open new public charter schools.

== Exhibitions ==
The painting has been exhibited at the following art institutions:

- Jean-Michel Basquiat: Une Rétrospective at Musée Cantini in Marseille, July–September 1992.
- Jean-Michel Basquiat at FAE Musée d'Art Contemporain in Pully-Lausanne, July–November 1993.
- Jean-Michel Basquiat: Témoignage 1977–1988 at Galerie Jérôme de Noirmont in Paris, October–November 1998.
- Pittura 1964–2003: Da Rauschenberg a Murakami at La Biennale di Venezia at Museo Correr in Venice, June–November 2003.
- The Jean-Michel Basquiat Show: 2006-2007 at Fondazione la Triennale di Milano in Milan, September 2006–January 2007.

== See also ==
- List of paintings by Jean-Michel Basquiat
- 1982 in art
