= Hannibal (Basquiat) =

1982 painting by Jean-Michel Basquiat

- Artist: Jean-Michel Basquiat
- Medium: Acrylic, oilstick and paper collage on canvas mounted on tied wooden supports
- Movement: Neo-expressionism
- Dimensions: 152.4 cm × 152.4 cm (60.0 in × 60.0 in)
- Location: Private collection

Hannibal is a painting created by American artist Jean-Michel Basquiat in 1982. The artwork, which features his signature skull and crown motifs, was sold at Sotheby's for $13.1 million in October 2016.

== History ==
Jean-Michel Basquiat executed Hannibal in 1982, a breakout year in his career. He had his first American one-man show at the Annina Nosei Gallery and he became the youngest artist to ever participate in documenta in Kassel. During this period, Basquiat began using roughly hewn canvas supports, as seen with Hannibal. These stretchers were built by Basquiat's studio assistant, Stephen Torton. Basquiat had initially hired Torton to be a bouncer at his loft party, but by the end of the night he offered him the job of building stretchers. Basquiat instructed: "Just use whatever materials are here." Therefore, Torton constructed stretchers and frames out of found materials such as carpet tacks, rope, canvas, and wooden moldings.

In May 1993, Hannibal was sold at Christie's New York for $79,500. It was purchased for $1 million in 2004 by a Panamanian company called Broadening-Info Enterprises.

In 2007, Hannibal was smuggled into the U.S. from Brazil by Brazilian financier Edemar Cid Ferreira. Ferreira, founder and former president of Banco Santos, owned the painting. He was convicted of bank fraud, tax evasion, and money laundering in 2006. As part of the case, a São Paulo judge ordered a search, seizure, and confiscation of assets that were acquired with illegally obtained funds from Banco Santos. In 2007, the painting was shipped from the Netherlands to a storage facility on the Upper East Side of Manhattan. Invoices failed to comply with U.S. customs laws—the item was not identified and it was labeled to be worth $100. After extensive litigation, the painting was returned to Brazil in 2015.

Hannibal drew zero bids when it was up for auction at Sotheby's New York in November 2015, however, it sold for $13.1 million when it appeared for sale at Sotheby's London in October 2016.

== Exhibitions ==
The painting has been exhibited at the following art institutions:

- Jean-Michel Basquiat: 1980-1988 at Quintana Gallery in Coral Gables, Florida, December 1996–February 1997.
- Jean-Michel Basquiat: Gemälde und Arbeiten auf Papier at KunstHausWien in Vienna, February–May 1999; Museum Würth in Künzelsau, September 2001–January 2002.

== See also ==
- List of paintings by Jean-Michel Basquiat
- 1982 in art
