= Flexible (Basquiat) =

1984 painting by Jean-Michel Basquiat

- Artist: Jean-Michel Basquiat
- Year: 1984
- Medium: Acrylic and oilstick on wood
- Movement: Neo-expressionism
- Dimensions: 259.1 cm × 190.5 cm (102.0 in × 75.0 in)
- Location: Private collection

Flexible is a painting created by American artist Jean-Michel Basquiat in 1984. The artwork, which portrays a griot, sold for $45.3 million at Phillips in May 2018.

== History ==
Jean-Michel Basquiat rose to prominence as a graffiti artist in the late 1970s, operating under the pseudonym SAMO. In the early 1980s, he began to direct his creative output towards painting and drawing. Basquiat often painted on objects he found in the streets, such as discarded doors and furniture. By 1984, he had achieved international stardom for his artwork. Flexible was painted on a slatted 8.5 ft tall wood support that had been deconstructed from the fence at his studio in Venice, California. Basquiat later made several wood slat picture supports from material purchased at a SoHo lumber yard in New York. The wood slat fencing material was used in more than 17 paintings made between 1984 and 1986, including Gold Griot (1984), M (1984), Grillo (1984), and Jim Crow (1986).

Flexible depicts a griot—a storyteller, musician, and purveyor of oral history from West African culture—whose arms are joined together as a continuous band above the head. It was offered for sale for the first time, publicly or privately, in 2018. The painting was consigned directly from the Basquiat's estate. In May 2018, it sold for $45.3 million at Phillips' 20th Century & Contemporary Evening Sale, exceeding the pre-sale estimate of $20 million. It is the first Basquiat painting made after 1983 to sell for more than $20 million.

== Exhibitions ==
Flexible has been exhibited at major art institutions worldwide, which include:

- Jean-Michel Basquiat at Mary Boone Gallery in New York, March 2–23, 1985.
- Jean-Michel Basquiat at Centre Culturel Français in Abidjan, Ivory Coast, October 10–November 7, 1986.
- Jean-Michel Basquiat at Whitney Museum of American Art in New York, October 1992–February 1993.
- Basquiat at the Brooklyn Museum in New York, March 11–June 2005; Museum of Contemporary Art, Los Angeles, July–October 2005; Museum of Fine Arts, Houston, November 2005–February 2006.
- Basquiat at Fondation Beyeler in Switzerland, May–September 2010; Musée d'Art Moderne de la Ville de Paris, October 2010–January 2011.

== See also ==
- List of paintings by Jean-Michel Basquiat
- 1984 in art
