= Untitled (Pollo Frito) =

1982 painting by Jean-Michel Basquiat

- Artist: Jean-Michel Basquiat
- Year: 1982
- Medium: Acrylic paint, oil paint, and enamel on canvas, in two parts
- Movement: Neo-expressionism
- Dimensions: 152.4 cm × 306.1 cm (60.0 in × 120.5 in)
- Location: Private collection

Untitled (Pollo Frito) is a painting created by American artist Jean-Michel Basquiat in 1982. The artwork was sold at Sotheby's for $25.7 million in November 2018.

== History ==
Jean-Michel Basquiat executed Untitled (Pollo Frito) in 1982, the year he fully gained legitimacy and recognition in the international art scene. He received his first American solo exhibition at the Annina Nosei Gallery in New York, followed by the Larry Gagosian Gallery in Los Angeles and Bruno Bischofberger's gallery in Zurich. He also received an invitation to attend the Documenta 7 exhibition in Kassel as the youngest artist to ever participate.

In 1982, Fay Gold, an art dealer from Atlanta, spotted Untitled (Pollo Frito) at the Annina Nosei Gallery during a trip to New York City. She had intended to buy a diamond bracelet with the $5,000 her husband gave her for her birthday, but, instead, she bought the painting. In 1985, Gold went to Basquiat's Great Jones Street studio and invited him to do a show at her gallery. He sold her a group of eleven drawings for $16,500 and later traveled to Atlanta for the opening at the Fay Gold Gallery in February 1986.

In 2002, Gold sold Untitled (Pollo Frito) for around $1 million. It sold for $25.7 million at Sotheby's Contemporary Art Evening Auction in November 2018.

The painting debuted on the art-investment platform Masterworks in July 2023. According to SEC documents, the painting was worth of $36,869,000.

== Analysis ==
The painting, which comprises two panels that together span 12 ft, is covered in "incendiary shades of orange, red, and yellow." Basquiat's key iconography are present, including a crown, repetitive words, and an expressionistic head. Drawn from the unfiltered grit of his environs in Lower Manhattan as the graffiti artist SAMO, Basquiat makes textual references like "BROKE GLASS" and "DANGER." Basquiat, who was of Puerto Rican heritage, often combined clever wordplay in English and Spanish in his artwork. On the left panel above the encircled word danger is "PELIGROSO," which translates to dangerous. The title "POLLO FRITO" (Spanish: fried chicken), may refer to the racist stereotype about African Americans loving fried chicken. Fried chicken and broken glass, along with "ASBESTOS" is also a warning to the danger of capitalist consumption. The word "asbestos" appears in several Basquiat paintings like Obnoxious Liberals (1982) and Per Capita (1983). There is a connection between asbestos and certain types of cancer and, in 1982, Johns-Manville Corporation filed for bankruptcy after facing liability for asbestos injury claims. At the time, it was the largest company ever to file bankruptcy, so by mentioning "asbestos" in his paintings, Basquiat suggesting corporate indifference to human welfare.

== Exhibitions ==
Untitled (Pollo Frito) has been exhibited at major art institutions worldwide, which include:

- Jean-Michel Basquiat at Annina Nosei Gallery in New York, March–April 1982.
- Jean-Michel Basquiat at Vrej Bahoomian Gallery in New York, October–November 1989.
- Jean-Michel Basquiat at Museo del Palacio de Bellas Artes in Mexico City, October–December 2004.
- Basquiat "Heads" at Van de Weghe Fine Art in New York, March–May 2006.
- The Jean-Michel Basquiat Show at Fondazione La Triennale di Milano in Milan, September 2006–January 2007.

== See also ==
- List of paintings by Jean-Michel Basquiat
- 1982 in art
