= Leonardo da Vinci's Greatest Hits =

1982 painting by Jean-Michel Basquiat

- Artist: Jean-Michel Basquiat
- Year: 1982
- Medium: Acrylic, oilstick and paper collage on canvas
- Movement: Neo-expressionism
- Dimensions: 183.3 cm × 213.2 cm (72.2 in × 83.9 in)
- Owner: The Schorr Family Collection

Leonardo da Vinci's Greatest Hits is a painting created by American artist Jean-Michel Basquiat in 1982.

== Analysis ==
Jean-Michel Basquiat primarily used texts as reference sources for his artwork. He drew inspiration from the medical book Gray's Anatomy, which had been given to him by his mother as a child while he recovered from a car accident in the hospital. Leonardo da Vinci's Greatest Hits references Renaissance man Leonardo da Vinci's anatomical drawings of body parts and graphic notations. Basquiat brought symbolism into this work with a depiction of African American folk hero John Henry on the lower left. Among the scattering of words written across a white collage, Basquiat's signature three crown motif appears three times. This painting "is almost a summary or encyclopedia of his work," said curator Kelly Baum.

== Exhibitions ==
Leonardo da Vinci's Greatest Hits was exhibited at the Fun Gallery in the East Village of Manhattan in 1982. The painting is owned by Herb and Lenore Schorr. In 2015, it was loaned to the Princeton University Art Museum in Princeton, New Jersey for the exhibition Collecting Contemporary, 1960–2015: Selections from the Schorr Collection.

== See also ==
- List of paintings by Jean-Michel Basquiat
- 1982 in art
