= La Hara =

1981 painting by Jean-Michel Basquiat

- Year: 1981
- Medium: Acrylic and oilstick on wood panel
- Movement: Neo-expressionism
- Dimensions: 180 cm × 121.3 cm (72 in × 47.75 in)
- Location: Private collection

La Hara is a painting created by American artist Jean-Michel Basquiat in 1981. The artwork, which depicts a skeletal police officer, sold for $35 million at Christie's in May 2017.

== History ==
Jean-Michel Basquiat painted La Hara in 1981, a pivotal moment when he transitioned from street artist to an art world sensation. He began working in the basement of Annina Nosei's gallery in SoHo where La Hara was executed. Basquiat's early paintings from this period are considered his most valuable.

== Analysis ==
La Hara is one of the few works of white men painted by Basquiat. The artwork depicts a menacing white skeletal figure wearing a peaked cap against a red background. Basquiat incorporates vivid colors and diagrams throughout the painting. The word "LA HARA" is written multiple times on the left side of the figure. Drawing from his Puerto Rican culture, la hara derives from the Nuyorican term la jara, slang for police, which is a play on the Irish surname O'Hara. O'Hara was considered a common surname for New York police officers during the 1940s and 1950s. The bottom of the painting is gray with steel jail cell bars.

== Exhibitions ==
The painting first appeared at auction when it sold at Sotheby's for $341,000 in 1989. It was later sold privately to American businessman and art collector Steve Cohen. The artwork sold for $35 million at Christie's post-war and contemporary art auction in May 2017, which exceeded the pre-sale estimate of $28 million.

La Hara has been exhibited at major art institutions worldwide, which include:

- Avanguadria Transavanguardia on the Aurelian Walls (from Porta Metronia to Porta Latina) in Rome, Italy, April–July 1982.
- Jean-Michel Basquiat: Peinture, dessin, écriture at Musée-Galerie de la Seita in Paris, France, 1993.
- Summer Exhibition at Tony Shafrazi Gallery in New York, June–August 1996.
- The Jean-Michel Basquiat Show at Fondazione La Triennale di Milano in Italy, September 2006–January 2007.
- Basquiat at Fondation Beyeler in Switzerland, May–September 2010; Musée d'Art Moderne de la Ville de Paris, October 2010–January 2011.
- Jean-Michel Basquiat at Gagosian Gallery in New York, February–April 2013.
- Jean-Michel Basquiat: Now's the Time at Art Gallery of Ontario in Toronto, Canada, February–April 2015.
- Basquiat's 'Defacement': The Untold Story at Guggenheim Museum in New York, June–November 2019.

== See also ==
- List of paintings by Jean-Michel Basquiat
