= Zenith (Basquiat and Warhol) =

Painting by Jean-Michel Basquiat and Andy Warhol

- Artist: Jean-Michel Basquiat and Andy Warhol
- Year: 1985
- Medium: Acrylic on canvas
- Movement: Neo-expressionism and pop art
- Dimensions: 297 cm × 673 cm (117 in × 265 in)
- Location: Private collection

Zenith is a painting created by American artists Jean-Michel Basquiat and Andy Warhol in 1985. It sold for $11.4 million at Phillips in May 2014, the highest price paid at auction for a Warhol-Basquiat collaboration.

== History ==
Andy Warhol and Jean-Michel Basquiat were formally introduced by art dealer Bruno Bischofberger in October 1982. They became creative partners and their prolific friendship defined the 1980s New York art scene. Artist Ronnie Cutrone, assistant to Warhol, said: "It was like some crazy art-world marriage and they were the odd couple. The relationship was symbiotic. Jean-Michel thought he needed Andy’s fame and Andy thought he needed Jean-Michel’s new blood. Jean-Michel gave Andy a rebellious image."

From 1984 to 1985, Warhol and Basquiat created a series of large paintings together. Their collaborations ended after their joint exhibition, Paintings, at the Tony Shafrazi Gallery drew poor reviews in September 1985. Their collaborative works merged their two styles. Warhol would start by painting a commercial image and then Basquiat would add his own flare. Describing the process, Basquiat said: "He would put something very concrete or recognizable, like a newspaper headline or a product logo, and I would sort of deface it, and then I would try to get him to work some more on it, and then I would work more on it." Zenith is titled after electronics company Zenith, whose red logo is centered on the canvas. It sold for $11.4 million at the Phillips Contemporary Art Evening Sale in May 2014, becoming the most expensive painting from their collaborations sold at auction.

== Exhibitions ==
Zenith has been exhibited at the following art institutions:

- Warhol-Basquiat: Collaborations at Didier Imbert Fine Art in Paris, September 29–November 25, 1989.
- Collaborations – Warhol/Basquiat/Clemente at Fridericianum in Kassel, Germany, February–May 1996; Villa Stuck in Munich, Germany, July–September 1996; Museo d'Arte Contemporanea, Castello di Rivoli, in Italy, October 1996–January 1997.
- Andy Warhol: A Factory at Kunstmuseum Wolfsburg in Wolfsburg, October 1998–January 1999; Palais des Beaux-Arts in Brussels, May 1999–September 1999); Guggenheim Museum in Bilbao, October 1999–April 2000.
- Warhol, Basquiat, Clemente: Obras En Colaboracion at Museo Nacional Centro de Arte Reina Sofía in Madrid, Spain, February–April 2002.
- The Andy Warhol Show at Fondazione La Triennale di Milano in Italy, September 2004–January 2005.
- Skulls at Galerie Bruno Bischofberger in Zurich, December 2005–February 2006.

== See also ==
- List of paintings by Jean-Michel Basquiat
- 1985 in art
