= Cadillac Moon =

1981 painting by Jean-Michel Basquiat

- Artist: Jean-Michel Basquiat
- Year: 1981
- Medium: Acrylic and oilstick on canvas
- Movement: Neo-expressionism
- Dimensions: 162 cm × 172 cm (63 3/4 in × 67 3/4 in)
- Location: Private collection

Cadillac Moon is a painting created by American artist Jean-Michel Basquiat in 1981. It is notable for being the first purchased Basquiat painting; bought by singer Debbie Harry for $200.

== History ==
The urban landscape was a recurring theme in Basquiat's work. Born in Brooklyn, New York, Basquiat began writing graffiti under the pseudonym SAMO in 1978. In 1979, he formed the band Gray with Michael Holman. In June 1980, Basquiat participated in The Times Square Show and his career as an artist began to take off. In late 1980, Basquiat began filming New York Beat (later renamed Downtown 81) directed by Edo Bertoglio and written and produced by Glenn O'Brien. His character paralleled his own life, a painter and musician trying to start a career. The film production crew bought Basquiat canvases and paint to make paintings for the film. The paintings that appear in the movie belonging to his character are by Basquiat himself, and are among his first canvases.

After filming ended in 1981, Basquiat's co-star Debbie Harry of Blondie purchased Cadillac Moon for $200. Basquiat also appeared in Blondie's music video for "Rapture." On Cadillac Moon, "staples of Basquiat’s mature work, covered in frenetic, childlike drawings and repetitive, almost prayer-like words and phrases." The painting depicts a stack of television sets on the right of the canvas with a single face on each screen, two cars—one Cadillac in the upper left corner. The letter A is repeated across the right of the canvas. On the bottom, Basquiat crossed out his SAMO© signature, then alluded to African-American baseball player Hank Aaron and signed JEAN MICHEL BASQUIAT 1981. During this period, he made the transition from street artist to a gallery artist. His first one-person exhibition, held in Modena, Italy (May 23 – June 20, 1981), was named SAMO.

Cadillac Moon was part of Basquiat's first European retrospective, Basquiat, in celebration of the 50th anniversary of his birth in 2010. The exhibit originated at the Fondation Beyeler in Basel, Switzerland and traveled to Paris afterward. While on display at the Musée d'Art Moderne de la Ville de Paris in November 2010, the painting attracted media attention when it was realized that it had been vandalized. Photographs revealed that slight marks made with a felt-tip pen were present while the work was on display in Basel.

"Cadillac Moon" is also the name of a song by New York based band Mink DeVille.

== See also ==
- List of paintings by Jean-Michel Basquiat
- 1981 in art
