= Untitled (1982 Basquiat devil painting) =

1982 painting by Jean-Michel Basquiat

- Artist: Jean-Michel Basquiat
- Year: 1982
- Medium: Acrylic on canvas
- Movement: Neo-expressionism
- Dimensions: 240 cm × 500 cm (94 in × 197 in)
- Owner: Private collection

Untitled is a painting created by American artist Jean-Michel Basquiat in 1982. The artwork was sold at Christie's for $57.3 million in May 2016. At the time, it was the record for Basquiat's most expensive painting. In 2022, it was sold for $85 million at Phillips, becoming Basquiat's third highest auction sale and fourth most expensive painting.

== History ==
Untitled was executed by Basquiat in Modena, Italy in 1982, which is considered his most valuable year, as the majority of the highest-selling Basquiat paintings at auction date to 1982. That year he also became the youngest artist ever invited to participate in Documenta in Kassel, Germany. Basquiat had initially been invited to Modena in 1981 by art dealer Emilio Mazzoli, for his first one-man show at Galleria d'Arte Emilio Mazzoli, after he had seen Basquiat's work at the New York/New Wave February 1981 show at New York's MoMA PS1. Basquiat returned to Modena in March 1982, and during this trip he created a series of paintings; Untitled being the largest at over sixteen feet wide and almost eight feet tall.

The artwork has often been identified as a self-portrait depicting Basquiat as a devil. It is dominated by sporadic brushwork and an array of vivid colors overlapping a fiery black devil at its center. The painting was a part of the collection art dealer Adam Lindemann and his wife, art dealer Amalia Dayan in New York. Lindemann purchased the painting for $4.5 million at the Sotheby's contemporary art evening sale in London in June 2004. It was sold to Japanese businessman and art collector Yusaku Maezawa for $57.3 million at Christie's post-war and contemporary art evening auction in May 2016. It was the most expensive Basquiat painting sold at auction until Maezawa purchased Untitled (1982) for $110.5 million at Sotheby's in May 2017. In May 2022, Maezawa sold the painting for $85 million at Phillips' 20th Century & Contemporary Art Evening Sale in New York.

== Exhibitions ==
Untitled has been exhibited at major art institutions worldwide, which include:

- Jean-Michel Basquiat, Paintings at Akira Ikeda Gallery in Tokyo, December 1985.
- Jean-Michel Basquiat at Galerie Enrico Navarra in Paris, April–June 1996.
- Jean-Michel Basquiat at Kaohsiung Museum of Fine Arts in Taiwan, January–June 1997; Pinacoteca do Estado de São Paulo in Brazil, June–August 1998.
- Basquiat a Venezia at Fondazione Bevilacqua La Masa in Venice, June–October 1999.
- Basquiat a Napoli at Il Museo Civico di Castel Nuovo in Naples, December 1999–March 2000.
- Jean-Michel Basquiat: Dipinti at Chiostro del Bramante in Rome, January–March 2002.
- Jean-Michel Basquiat: The Work of a Lifetime at Musée Maillol in Paris, June–October 2003.
- Basquiat at Fondation Beyeler in Switzerland, May–September 2010; Musée d'Art Moderne de la Ville de Paris, October 2010–January 2011.

== See also ==
- List of paintings by Jean-Michel Basquiat
- 1982 in art
