= Untitled (Skull) =

1981 painting by Jean-Michel Basquiat

- Skull
- Artist: Jean-Michel Basquiat
- Year: 1981
- Medium: Acrylic and oilstick on canvas
- Movement: Neo-expressionism
- Dimensions: 205.74 cm × 175.9 cm (81.00 in × 69.25 in)
- Location: The Broad, Los Angeles

Untitled is a 1981 painting created by American artist Jean-Michel Basquiat. An X-ray-like vision of the head's exposed upper and lower jaw accounts for its misinterpretation as a skull. The painting was acquired by Eli and Edythe Broad in 1982, and is housed at The Broad museum in Los Angeles.

== History ==
Basquiat began working on Untitled in early 1979 . Unlike most of his pieces which were completed exuberantly within a few days, Untitled remained unfinished for several months as Basquiat stalled its completion. Art historian Fred Hoffman's description alludes to a vision Basquiat may have conjured in the studio: "One can only speculate about the reasons for this hesitation, but several individuals close to the artist—including myself and Annina Nosei, the artist’s dealer at the time—suspect that this young, unseasoned artist hesitated to complete the work because he was caught off guard, possibly even frightened, by the power and energy emanating from this unexpected image."

Untitled depicts both inside and outside dimensions of a head, existing between life and death. The eyes are listless, as if the head was lobotomized. The subdued facial expression is a contrast to the vibrant colors that suggest an abundance of internal activity. Basquiat's use of heads and skulls are deeply rooted in his identity as a Black American and are evocative of African masks. "He developed a unique style, which combined expressive and at times violent brushstrokes with words, symbols, and a variety of materials, to confront social issues."

The painting was presented as Untitled at Basquiat's debut American solo exhibition at the Annina Nosei Gallery in 1982. When it was purchased some months later, the word "Skull" was added to the title and has accompanied the painting ever since, through numerous exhibitions. Hoffman suggests the change in title was "the result of confusing the work with the more traditional iconography of the memento mori, in which a skull implies death."

== See also ==
- List of paintings by Jean-Michel Basquiat
- 1981 in art
