= Jim Crow (Basquiat) =

1986 painting by Jean-Michel Basquiat

- Artist: Jean-Michel Basquiat
- Year: 1986
- Medium: Acrylic and grease pencil on wood
- Movement: Neo-expressionism
- Dimensions: 205.3 cm × 244 cm (80.8 in × 96 in)
- Location: Private collection

Jim Crow is a painting created by American artist Jean-Michel Basquiat in 1986. In October 2017, the anti-segregation painting sold for $17.7 million at Christie's Post-War & Contemporary art auction in Paris, becoming the most expensive artwork by Basquiat sold in France.

== Analysis ==
The artwork is titled after Jim Crow laws, which enforced racial segregation in the Southern United States. The phrase "JIM CROW" is painted at the top center of the painting. Directly below, across the whitewashed wooden slats, is an almost featureless face of a black figure with glowing red eyes. This head sits atop a withered body, which dissolves into a skeletal arrangement of ribs and limbs. Behind the figure is the Mississippi River, a natural barrier that divides the eastern states from the rest of the continental United States. As if to indicate the importance of this natural phenomenon, Basquiat spelled out "MISSISSIPPI" across the river in large golden letters. It is also written repeatedly over a dozen times throughout the painting in green. There are other rivers mentioned on the left of the figure such as the Hudson River, Ohio River and Thames River, but the repetition of Mississippi emphasizes its importance in American history.

The state of Mississippi was particularly resistant to the struggle for racial equality. Historian Charles Payne recounted that the state had the highest rate of lynchings, recording 539 between "the end of Reconstruction and the modern civil rights era." Although the state had fewer Jim Crow laws, historian Neil McMillen described Mississippi as the most "racially restrictive state" because the limits of freedom for African Americans were defined almost the moment slaves were emancipated. "Where popular convention and white sensibilities governed virtually every phase of interracial contact, there was little cause legally to separate black from white," McMillen explained. "White Supremacy was based on oral or traditional discrimination without legal sanction. Negroes accepted these traditions as a way of life and as a method of survival."

== Exhibitions ==
Jim Crow has been exhibited at the following art institutions:

- Jean-Michel Basquiat: Peinture, dessin, écriture at Musée-Galerie de la Seita in Paris, December 1993–February 1994.
- Jean-Michel Basquiat at Mitsukoshi Museum of Art, Shinjuku in Tokyo, October–November 1997.
- Basquiat at the Brooklyn Museum in New York, March 11–June 2005; Museum of Contemporary Art, Los Angeles, July–October 2005; Museum of Fine Arts, Houston, November 2005–February 2006.
- The painting is listed in the catalogue for the Basquiat and the Bayou exhibit at the Ogden Museum of Southern Art in New Orleans (October 2014–January 2015), but it wasn't included in the installation.

== See also ==
- List of paintings by Jean-Michel Basquiat
- 1986 in art
