= Giancarlo Giammetti =

Italian businessman (born 1942)

- Born: 5 February 1942 (age 84); Rome, Italy
- Education: Collegio San Gabriele
- Occupation: Honorary President of Valentino
- Known for: Co-founder of Valentino
- Partner: Valentino Garavani (1960–1972)

Giancarlo Giammetti (born 5 February 1942) is an Italian businessman, known for his professional and personal association with Valentino Garavani. He is the founder with Valentino Garavani of the Valentino fashion house. He is the Honorary President of Valentino. In 2006, he was inducted in the International Best Dressed List Hall of Fame.

== Biography ==
Giancarlo Giammetti was born in Rome in 1942. He attended liceo classico at the Collegio San Gabriele in Rome and studied at a local faculty of architecture.

He met Valentino Garavani in 1960, when he was 18 and Valentino 28, and the two created the fashion company Valentino that same year. In 1989, he created with Valentino the Valentino Academy, a cultural and art exhibition space located near Valentino's atelier in Rome. In 1998, the Valentino brand was sold to the Italian conglomerate Holding di Partecipazioni (HdP) for $300 million, and, in 2002, to the Marzotto group for $210 million. Giammetti eventually left the Valentino group in 2007 after its acquisition by British private equity group Permira, as the structure had evolved into a corporate giant and he felt his days were over. In 2026, following the death of Valentino Garavani, the New York Times described their collaboration: "If Mr. Garavani aspired to be the king of Roman couture, Mr. Giammetti was his prime minister, protecting and enabling his particular vision of elegance."

In 2013, Assouline Publishing published Private: Giancarlo Giammetti a collection of photos "culled" from 57,000 personal pictures Giammetti had catalogued over the years. A party was hosted in Milan by Italian Vogue editor Franca Sozzani to celebrate the book's release, which was attended by Anna Wintour, Georgia May Jagger, Joan Smalls, Olivia Palermo.

He and Garavani created the Valentino Garavani Foundation in 2017 to focus on Valentino's archives and philanthropic affairs. In 2021, he put up for sale, at Christie's, Jean-Michel Basquiat's In this case (1983) for $50 million, which he had purchased in 2007 from the Gagosian.

== Publications ==
- Giammetti, Giancarlo (5 November 2013). Private Giancarlo Giammetti (in Italian). Assouline. ISBN 978-1614281412.

== In popular culture ==
The relationship between Valentino and Giammetti and the events leading to their retirement and the party in Rome, and the party itself, are covered in the 2008 film Valentino: The Last Emperor.

== See also ==
- Thomas Ammann
