= Tony Shafrazi Gallery =

- Established: 1979
- Dissolved: 2014
- Location: New York City
- Coordinates: 40°45′1″N 74°0′17″W
- Type: Art gallery
- Founder: Tony Shafrazi
- Website: tonyshafrazigallery.com

Tony Shafrazi Gallery is a New York City art gallery that was opened in 1979 by art dealer Tony Shafrazi.

Shafrazi’s showcased the art of artists such as Kenny Scharf, Jean-Michel Basquiat, Andy Warhol, Keith Haring, Francis Bacon and Futura 2000.

In 1985, the Shafrazi Gallery displayed what The New York Times called a pas de deux of art by Jean-Michel Basquiat and Andy Warhol.

Throughout the years Shafrazi also exhibited the work of artists that included William S. Burroughs, Patrick Caulfield, Keith Sonnier, Enzo Cucchi, as well as Tom Wesselmann, Jasper Johns and Roberta Smith.

Shafrazi's gallery closed in 2014. Some of his art clients included Donald Trump and Larry Silverstein.

In 2026, Shafrazi was referenced by Madonna on the third single Danceteria (song) of her fifteenth album Confessions II. Madonna mentions that Tony Shafrazi Gallery was regularly frequented by herself and other notable New Yorker creatives such as Keith Haring and Kenny Scharf.
