= SAMO =

Graffiti tag

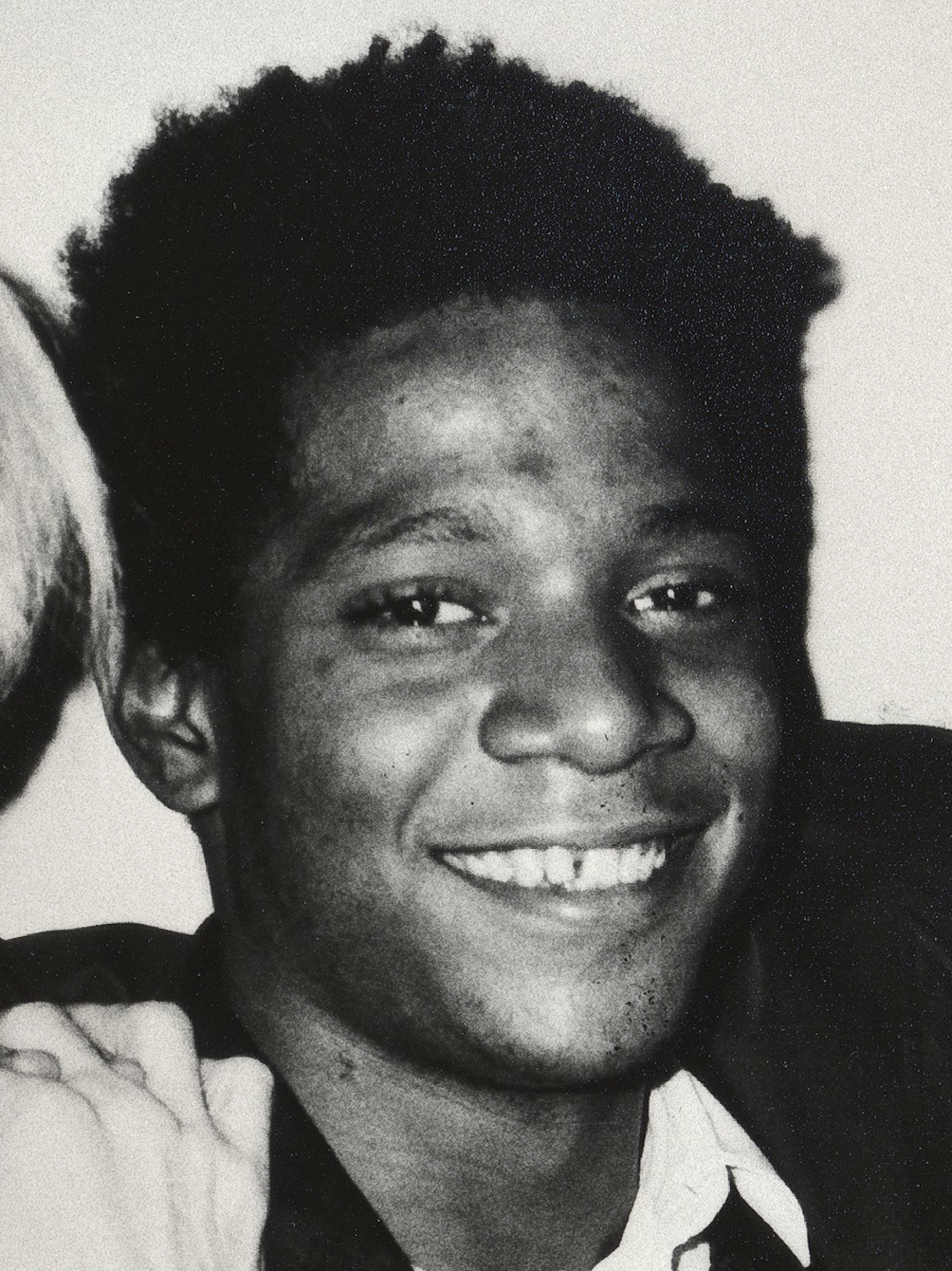
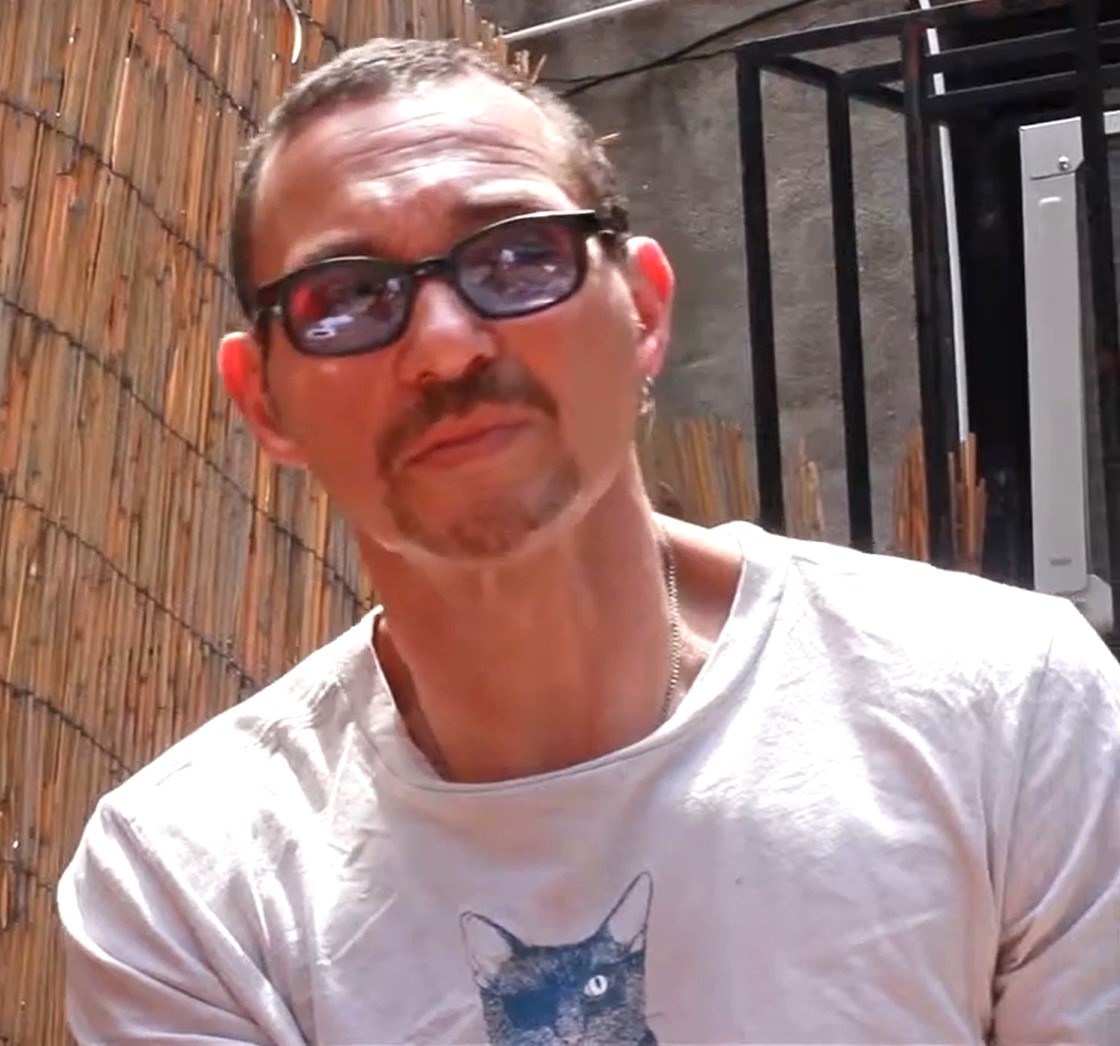
Jean-Michel Basquiat and Al Diaz, the two creators of SAMO

SAMO (/ˈseɪmoʊ/ SAY-moh) is a graffiti tag originally used on the streets of New York City from 1978 to 1980. The tag, written with a copyright symbol as "SAMO©", is primarily associated with the artist Jean-Michel Basquiat, but was originally developed as a collaboration between Basquiat and Al Diaz.

The SAMO tag accompanied short phrases, which were poetic and satirical advertising slogans, mainly spray painted on the streets of downtown Manhattan. Basquiat eventually used the tag himself, creating some non-graffiti work on paper and canvas using the tag, after killing off the SAMO graffiti by painting "SAMO© IS DEAD" around the streets of downtown. Decades later, Diaz resurrected the SAMO tag.

== Background ==
In 1976, New York-born artists Jean-Michel Basquiat (1960–1988) and Al Diaz (b. 1959) met at City-As-School High School, an alternative high school in Manhattan. They bonded, partly because of similar academic problems and a shared Puerto Rican heritage. Diaz had been a young member of the New York graffiti scene of the early 1970s. His tag, "Bomb I", was included in Norman Mailer's famous book The Faith of Graffiti in 1974.

Basquiat and Diaz created the phrase "SAMO" during a stoned conversation, calling the marijuana they smoked "the same old crap," then shortening the phrase to "Same Old" and eventually "SAMO". "It started ... as a private joke and then grew" Basquiat recalled. Basquiat took the lead in creating a character called SAMO for the Spring 1977 issue of their school newspaper, the Basement Blues Press, which focused on philosophy and alternative religions.

Basquiat, Diaz, Shannon Dawson and Matt Kelly worked on a comic style endorsement of the false religion, photocopied as a pamphlet "Based on an original concept by Jean Basquiat and Al Diaz." The concept was further developed in a theatre-as-therapy course in Upper Manhattan (called "Family Life") that was used by the trio as part of the City-As-School program. "Jean started elaborating on the idea and I began putting my thoughts into it," said Diaz. The City-As-School 1977/78 Yearbook includes a photo of the SAMO graffiti: "SAMO© AS AN ALTERNATIVE TO PLASTIC FOOD STANDS."

== SAMO© graffiti ==
In May 1978, Basquiat and Diaz started to put up the first SAMO© graffiti in Manhattan. They wrote phrases with marker pens and often with an ironic copyright symbol attached. SAMO was primarily written on buildings, but they also did it in elevators, public toilets, and on the D train in the New York City Subway. On December 11, 1978, The Village Voice published an article about the SAMO graffiti. According to Henry Flynt, Shannon Dawson (later of the band Konk) played a major part in the trio of writers in the first wave SAMO graffiti writers, but most accounts, including those of Basquiat, say the writing was done by Basquiat and Diaz. When asked about other people, Basquiat said "No, No, it was me and Al Diaz."

Diaz graduated from City-As-School in 1978, and Basquiat dropped out of school and left his father's home in Brooklyn to spend time homeless and living with friends in Manhattan in June 1978. From that point on, the SAMO graffiti took off in SoHo, parts of the East Village, and the area immediately around the School of Visual Arts were prime targets for the graffiti.

The SoHo News noticed the graffiti, and published a few pictures of the idiomatic phrases with a query about who had done them. According to Henry Flynt, who photographed much of the graffiti, "The collective graffiti employed anonymity to seem corporate and engulfing. The tone was utterly different from the morose and abject tone of Basquiat's solo work. The implication was that SAMO© was a drug that could solve all problems. SOHO, the art world, and Yuppies were satirized with Olympian wit."

By late 1978, the two were using spray paint to quickly get up larger phrases. One biographer noted that "while some of the phrases might seem political, none of them were simple propaganda slogans. Some were outright surrealist, or looked like fragments of poetry." "We would take turns coming up with the sayings" said Al Diaz. Many of these retained the same ideas as the comic strip SAMO of high school:

SAMO© SAVES IDIOTS AND GONZOIDS...
SAMO©...4 MASS MEDIA MINDWASH
SAMO© AS AN ALTERNATIVE TO GOD

But they also used it to make critical comments towards the art scene in SoHo and college students comfortably studying in art schools:

SAMO©...4 THE SO-CALLED AVANT-GARDE
SAMO AS AN ALTERNATIVE 2 PLAYING ART WITH THE 'RADICAL CHIC' SECT ON DADDY'S $ FUNDS

Some of the comments seemed to look critically at consumer society as a whole:

MICROWAVE & VIDEO X-SISTANCE
"BIG-MAC"
FOR X-MASS...
SAMO©

People began to notice the graffiti appearing on walls all over downtown, recognizing the strange phrases, but no one knew who did them. Basquiat said he could sometimes do thirty on a busy day. Sometimes the SAMO© graffiti would refer to its own spread, as in a large, mural sized, multiple choice graffiti:

WHICH OF THE FOLLOWING IS OMNIPRESENT?
[ ] LEE HARVEY OSWALD
[ ] COCA-COLA LOGO
[ ] GENERAL MELONRY
[ ] SAMO©...

Art critic Jeffrey Deitch called it "disjointed street poetry" and remembered that "Back in the late seventies, you couldn't go anywhere interesting in Lower Manhattan without noticing that someone named SAMO had been there first." Later Basquiat would look back on this as just "Teenage stuff. We'd just drink Ballantine Ale all the time and write stuff and throw bottles ... just teenage stuff" he told an interviewer asking about SAMO. "Samo was sophomoric. Same old shit." he explained to Anthony Haden-Guest. "It was supposed to be a logo, like Pepsi." However, Diaz recognized the original intelligence in this work. "The stuff you see on the subways now is inane. Scribbled. SAMO was like a refresher course because there's some kind of statement being made. It's not just ego graffiti."

In 1979, Henry Flynt began taking photos of the SAMO graffiti, not knowing who had done them. After first exhibiting the photos he got to know Al Diaz and Shannon Dawson, who helped him uncover who did which tag. He has published many of the SAMO graffiti photos on the Internet.

By 1979, Basquiat had started to do graffiti on his own and became immersed in the Mudd Club scene. Artist Keith Haring had been following the SAMO graffiti and befriended Basquiat that year. Haring recalled:

I still hadn't met Jean-Michel—I had only heard about him. Well, one day a kid came up to me just as I was going into SVA, and he asked if I could walk him through, past the security guard. He wanted to get inside the school. I said, “Sure” and we walked through. I disappeared into a class. When I came out an hour later, I noticed there were all these fresh SAMO poems and tags in places they hadn’t been an hour ago. I put two and two together and realized that the person I had walked through was Basquiat.

Basquiat then started hanging around with Haring and other School of Visual Arts students, such as Kenny Scharf and John Sex. Scharf said that in 1979, he would go out on forays doing wall drawings with Basquiat. "I would do Jetson and Flintstone heads and have them speaking in some foreign tongue," Scharf said.

Although Basquiat was to say there was "no ambition" in the work at all, it was very striking for many people to see the places the SAMO graffiti was targeted: around the SoHo galleries and even at the School of Visual Arts. Glenn O'Brien notes that "Ninety percent of SAMO graffiti was executed in the heart of the art neighborhood. He kind of stuck to SoHo ... So that it was sort of advertising for himself."

In April 1979, Basquiat attended the Canal Zone Party hosted by Michael Holman and he revealed himself as SAMO.

In 1979, Basquiat began appearing on Glenn O'Brien's underground cable TV talk show TV Party, where he was introduced as the person behind SAMO.

In early 1980, Basquiat had a falling out with Diaz and soon began to focus on his painting career. Basquiat said, "I wrote SAMO IS DEAD all over the place. And I started painting." Keith Haring held a mock wake for SAMO at Club 57.

For the movie Downtown 81 (2000), Basquiat was filmed in streets of the Lower East Side recreating much of his SAMO graffiti. These include:

PAY FOR SOUP / BUILD A FORT / SET THAT ON FIRE
THE WHOLE LIVERY LINE
BOW LIKE THIS WITH
THE BIG MONEY ALL
CRUSHED INTO THESE FEET

These Downtown 81 images are the most common illustrations of Jean-Michel Basquiat's graffiti, but were not signed "SAMO."

As well known and omnipresent as the graffiti were, they gradually disappeared from the street, either being painted over as common vandalism, or carefully taken down for resale when Basquiat's paintings began to command high prices. Henry Flynt, Peter Moore, Martha Cooper, and Glenn O'Brien are responsible for the few documented photos the original SAMO graffiti. The SAMO graffiti is still being cited by contemporary street artists.

After Donald Trump's 2016 presidential election victory, Diaz felt compelled to resurrect the SAMO tag. "My current work deals mostly with present-day life on this massively screwed up planet of ours," he told artnet News. In 2017, Diaz partnered with Massachusetts-based creative agency House of Roulx for a series of collaborations.

== SAMO in Basquiat's art ==
Basquiat continued to use the SAMO moniker after he stopped writing graffiti in 1980. Some of his early drawings and paintings on canvas were signed SAMO. In June 1980, Basquiat took part in The Times Square show, his first as SAMO and as a painter. In February 1981, he participated in the group show New York/New Wave billed as SAMO. His first one-person gallery show from May 23 to June 20, 1981 in Modena, Italy was named SAMO.

Many of Basquiat's paintings and drawings from 1980/81 include phrases originally used in the SAMO collaboration, along with others (like MILK©) in the same style. Such phrases cropped up occasionally for the rest of his career. His painting Cadillac Moon (1981) has the inscription in the lower left "SAMO©" crossed out, and the names "AARON" (for Henry Aaron), and "JEAN-MICHEL BASQUIAT" written instead.

== Same Old Gallery ==
To mark the 30th anniversary of Basquiat’s death on August 12, 2018, Adrian Wilson conceived a commemorative tribute, to which Diaz added a SAMO tag on the front gates of his former home and studio at 57 Great Jones Street in NoHo, Manhattan. Andy Warhol had rented the space to Basquiat, who lived there from August 1983 until his death in August 1988. Wilson spent the next month negotiating with the leaseholders to donate the use of 57 Great Jones Street for a one off art gallery combining the art of Diaz, SAMO, and early graffiti tags and historical items from when Diaz and Basquiat were school friends in the 1970's.

In partnership with gallery owner Brian Shevlin, leaseholder representative Lisa Tobari and referencing the etymology of SAMO, the Same Old Gallery opened on September 21, 2018. The exhibition was notable for its oversized Same Old Visitors book in which graffiti artists, former Basquiat friends, and the general public added messages and created art of their own. Wilson kept the gallery open until October 21, 2018 but lack of sales meant it was not economically viable to invest in the space going forward and it became a housewares store.
