= Brant Foundation =

Art gallery in New York City and Connecticut

Coordinates: 40°43′34.2″N 73°59′6.23″W

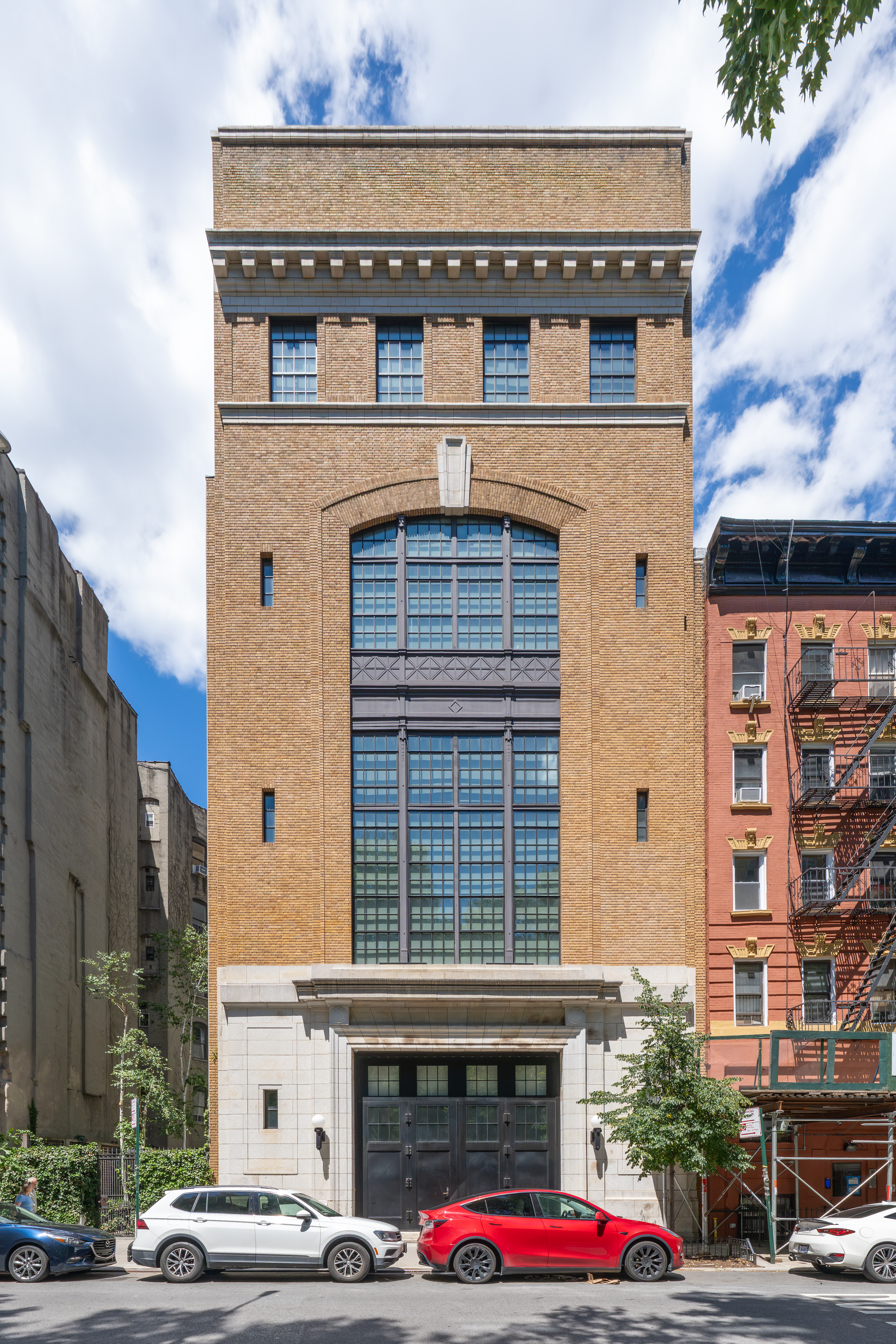
Brant Foundation East Village

The Brant Foundation Art Study Center is a private art collection and gallery with exhibition spaces in New York City and nearby Greenwich, Connecticut. The collections, focused on modern and contemporary art, are privately owned by Peter Brant and open to the public; reservations must be booked in advance.

== East Village gallery ==
The Foundation's East Village, Manhattan museum opened in 2019 at 421 East 6th Street, a yellow-brick former Consolidated Edison substation. The renovation of the space, described by art critic Deborah Solomon as "austere perfection", was done by Richard Gluckman of Gluckman Tang Architects. After ceasing to be a ConEd substation, the building was purchased by the artist Walter De Maria, serving as his studio; Brant bought it for $27 million after the artist died in 2013.

== Greenwich ==
On May 9, 2009, The Brant Foundation Art Study Center opened in Greenwich, CT. On the site of a converted 110-year-old stone barn, architect Richard Gluckman redesigned the 9,800-square-foot (910 m^{2}) space as a gallery and learning center, which will showcase long-term exhibitions and promote the appreciation of contemporary art and design. The non-profit center is open to the public by appointment. The Brant Foundation Art Study Center featured an exhibition by artist Urs Fischer in 2010 and painter Josh Smith in 2011. Brant's tax returns for 2010 showed that he contributed $3 million to the foundation, and it spent $1.8 million on acquisitions, exhibitions and building-related costs. In 2016, the museum was scrutinized as a tax evasion strategy that allowed Brant to benefit from a tax write off while providing limited public benefit.
