= Tony Shafrazi =

American art dealer, gallery owner, and artist

- Born: Tony Shafrazian; May 8, 1943 (age 83); Abadan, Iran
- Education: Royal College of Art
- Occupations: Art dealer, gallery owner

Tony Shafrazi (born May 8, 1943) is an Iranian-born American art dealer, gallery owner, and artist. He is the owner of the Tony Shafrazi Gallery in New York City who deals in artwork by artists such as Francis Bacon, Keith Haring, and David LaChapelle.

== Early life and education ==
Tony Shafrazian was born in Abadan, Iran, to Iranian Armenian parents and raised Christian. His parents divorced when he was two years old. At the age of 13, his father, an oil-company executive, and his stepmother took Shafrazi to England and left him to study there. He first went to a vicarage in Bilston, then to boarding school in Whittlebury, and later Hammersmith College of Art & Building. He attended the Royal College of Art from 1963 to 1967. While attending Royal College of Art, Shafrazi visited New York City in 1965, staying in a YMCA that was near Andy Warhol's Factory. On that trip, he met Roy Lichtenstein, Andy Warhol, and art dealer Leo Castelli.

He moved to New York City in 1969, where he lectured at several universities, including the School of Visual Arts.

== Art work ==
=== Shafrazi and Guernica ===
On February 28, 1974, Shafrazi spray-painted Picasso's 1937 painting Guernica, which hung in the Museum of Modern Art, with the words "KILL LIES ALL" in foot-high letters. He deliberately wrote the confusing phrase, "KILL LIES ALL" instead of "ALL LIES KILL", as an allusion to James Joyce's 1939 novel, Finnegans Wake, so that it could be read from any direction. When a guard finally grabbed him, Shafrazi shouted, "Call the curator. I am an artist."

The paint was easily removed as the painting was heavily varnished. It is believed that Shafrazi was protesting the announcement, the day before, of the release on bail of U.S. lieutenant William Calley. Calley, then under house arrest following his conviction, in 1971, for his part in the My Lai massacre in Vietnam, had petitioned for habeas corpus; he had initially been sentenced to life imprisonment. Although his appeal was overturned in June, he was finally released from U.S. Army custody later in the year after having received a limited pardon from Richard Nixon.

Shafrazi was a member of the Art Workers' Coalition, which in 1970 had staged a protest at MoMA by unfurling a copy of the famous My Lai protest poster And babies in front of the Guernica painting, which itself depicts the tragedies of war and the suffering it inflicts upon innocent civilians. Shafrazi was later given five years' probation, without a trial.

=== Art Basel 2012 ===
Shafrazi dedicated his booth at Art Basel 2012 to his own artwork. After nine hours, he added other artists to his booth.

== Art dealer ==
In 1976, only a few years after the spray painting incident, Shafrazi returned to his homeland and became the art advisor to the Shah of Iran and Kamran Diba, then director of the Teheran Museum of Contemporary Art. Shafrazi went to about 15 of the top New York dealers at the time — including Leo Castelli, Ileana Sonnabend, Paula Cooper, John Weber, and Irving Blum — and helped assemble a 20th-century art collection on the Shah's behalf within four years. As he did so his power expanded in the art market. The museum Shafrazi had constructed in Tehran to house this collection epitomized the Shah's modern Iranian state, thus the collection was predominantly Western: from Impressionism to Abstract Expressionism, Pop and Conceptual Art, including works by Andy Warhol, Roy Lichtenstein, and Willem de Kooning.

In 1978, Shafrazi briefly opened his own commercial gallery in a small Tehran shopfront but closed it because of conditions in the country leading up to the 1979 Revolution. He lost much of his art during that time but safely returned to New York City.

Shafrazi converted his rented apartment into a makeshift gallery where he slept on a small loft bed at night. In 1979, he opened his first New York City gallery, and within a few years he had made his reputation handling talents like Donald Baechler and then-hot graffiti artists like Jean-Michel Basquiat, Keith Haring, and Kenny Scharf. Throughout the 1980s he exhibited numerous artists of various tendencies including William S. Burroughs, Patrick Caulfield, Mark Dagley, Gerard Hemsworth, Michael Heizer, Olivier Mosset and Keith Sonnier along with European artists like Brian Clarke, Enzo Cucchi, Hervé Di Rosa, and Jean-Charles Blais. In 1985 the Tony Shafrazi Gallery showed "Warhol, TKO in 16 rounds." The show's poster featured the Basquiat and Warhol dressed as boxers, ready to fight. In 1990, he opened a new 13,000-square-foot gallery at 119 Wooster Street, with an exhibition entitled "American Masters of the 60's" and including Carl Andre, Tom Wesselmann, Jasper Johns, Donald Judd, Frank Stella, and Andy Warhol.

In 1999, the Francis Bacon estate chose Shafrazi as its United States representative. In 2004, the gallery opened another space on 26th Street with a large show of paintings by Picasso, Francis Bacon and Jean-Michel Basquiat.

Shafrazi's gallery closed in 2014. His clients have included Donald Trump and Larry Silverstein.

In 2026, Shafrazi was referenced by Madonna on the third single Danceteria (song) of her fifteenth album Confessions II. Madonna mentions that Tony Shafrazi Gallery was regularly frequented by herself and other notable New Yorker creatives such as Keith Haring and Kenny Scharf.

== Personal life ==
In 1995, Stephanie Seymour and Peter Brant had Shafrazi serve as the best man at their wedding at an estate outside Paris.

Tony Shafrazi is also actively involved in supporting Children of Armenia Fund, a charitable organization that aims to advance rural communities in Armenia. He is the Honorary Chair of COAF Honorary Board.

In 2020, Shafrazi publicly supported Donald Trump for president.

== See also ==
- Children of Armenia Fund
