= Annina Nosei =

Italian-born art dealer and gallerist (born 1939)

- Born: 1939 (age 85–86); Rome, Italy
- Occupation(s): Art dealer, gallerist

Annina Nosei (born 1939) is an Italian-born art dealer and gallerist. Nosei is best known for being Jean-Michel Basquiat’s first art dealer and providing him with studio space in the basement of her gallery. From 1981 to 2006, the Annina Nosei Gallery represented or exhibited work by artists such as Barbara Kruger, Robert Longo, Ghada Amer, and Shirin Neshat.

== Early life and education ==
Annina Nosei was born in Rome, Italy, the daughter of a classics professor. She received doctorates in literature and philosophy from the University of Rome.

== Career ==
After graduating in the early 1960s, Nosei worked at Ileana Sonnabend' s Paris gallery. In 1964, Nosei received a Fulbright Program grant and moved to the United States, where she taught at the University of Michigan. She later taught at the University of California, Los Angeles (UCLA), St. John's University in New York City, and Kingsborough Community College in Brooklyn.

While teaching at UCLA in 1965, Nosei met art dealer John Weber through artist Robert Rauschenberg. Nosei was married to Weber from 1966 to 1973; they have a daughter named Paolina Weber. Nosei helped organize and install exhibitions at Weber's gallery. In 1979, Nosei began to show and deal art in a loft owned by Larry Gagosian at 421 West Broadway in New York City. She showed work by David Salle, Donald Newman, and Richard Prince.

=== Annina Nosei Gallery ===
In 1980, Nosei opened her own gallery at 100 Prince Street in SoHo.

In 1981, Nosei became aware of emerging artist Jean-Michel Basquiat at the New York/New Wave exhibit, curated by Diego Cortez at New York's MoMA PS1. She invited Basquiat to participate in her Public Address group show later that year and provided him with studio space in the basement of her gallery. Among the other artists that Nosei was showing for the first time at the Public Address show were Jenny Holzer, Barbara Kruger, and Keith Haring. Nosei gave Basquiat his first American one-man show in March 1982. She arranged for him to move into a loft which also served as a studio at 101 Crosby Street in SoHo. Nosei and Basquiat had conflicts about the transactions of his paintings, so he left her gallery by the summer of 1982 and Bruno Bischofberger became his art dealer.

In 1995, Nosei moved the gallery to 530 West 22nd Street in Chelsea, where she gave Shirin Neshat a solo exhibit that September. The Annina Nosei Gallery closed in 2006.

Nosei was a member of the authentication committee for the estate of Jean-Michel Basquiat, which ceased operation in 2012.

== Legacy ==
Nosei donated most of the gallery’s archive to the Fales Library and Special Collections at New York University (NYU). In 2024, she donated the gallery’s catalogues to Magazzino Italian Art’s Germano Celant Research Center in Cold Spring, New York.
