= Oil stick =

Oil-based paint sticks for drawing and painting

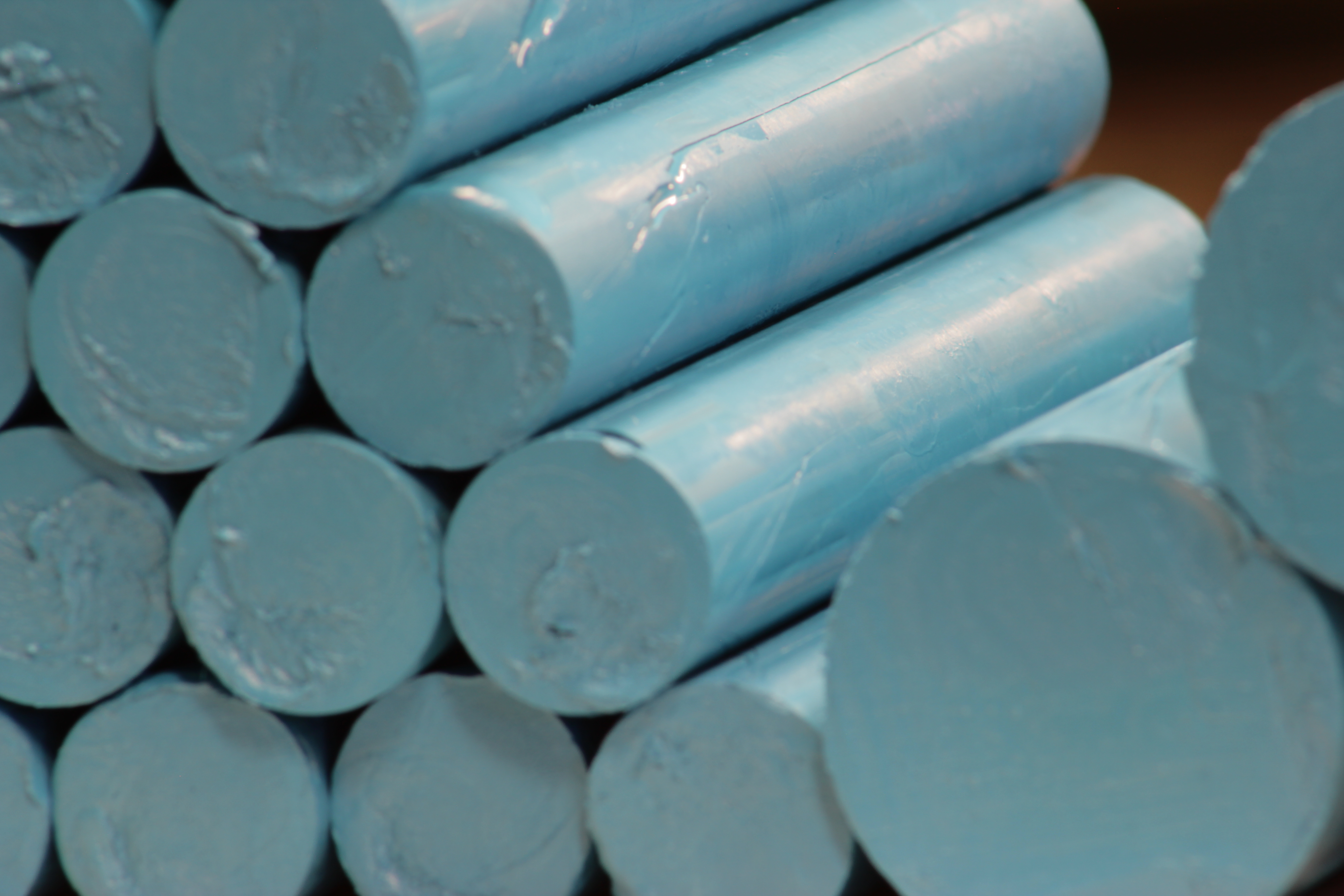
A stack of Turquoise Blue "Pigment Sticks" in the factory of R&F Handmade Paints in Kingston NY ready to be wrapped.

Oil sticks or oil bars are an art medium. Oil sticks are oil paint in a stick form similar to that of a crayon or pastel. Oil sticks are made by blending the oil and pigment with wax and pouring it into molds to form an oil stick. It is distinguished from oil pastels in that a drying oil such as linseed oil is used as the main binder whereas oil pastels use a non-drying oil as the primary binder. Oil sticks can be used interchangeably with traditional oil paints to produce drawings, paintings, and sketches. Popularized in the 1980s by such artists as Jean-Michel Basquiat, oil sticks have become much more common in contemporary oil painting in recent years.

== See also ==
- List of artistic media
