= Neo-expressionism =

Art movement

Neo-expressionism is a style of late modernist or early-postmodern painting and sculpture that emerged in the late 1970s. Neo-expressionists were sometimes called Transavantgarde, Junge Wilde or Neue Wilden ('The new wild ones'; 'New Fauves' would better meet the meaning of the term). It is characterized by intense subjectivity and rough handling of materials.

Neo-expressionism developed as a reaction against conceptual art and minimal art of the 1970s. Neo-expressionists returned to portraying recognizable objects, such as the human body (although sometimes in an abstract manner), in a rough and violently emotional way, often using vivid colors. It was overtly inspired by German Expressionist painters, such as Emil Nolde, Max Beckmann, George Grosz, Ernst Ludwig Kirchner, James Ensor and Edvard Munch. It is also related to American lyrical abstraction painting of the 1960s and 1970s, the Hairy Who movement in Chicago, the Bay Area Figurative School of the 1950s and 1960s, the continuation of abstract expressionism, precedents in Pop Painting, and New Image Painting: a vague late 1970s term applied to painters who employed a strident figurative style with cartoon-like imagery and abrasive handling owing something to neo-expressionism. The New Image Painting term was given currency by a 1978 exhibition entitled New Image Painting held at the Whitney Museum.

== Critical reception ==
Neo-expressionism dominated the art market until the mid-1980s. The style emerged internationally and was viewed by many critics, such as Achille Bonito Oliva and Donald Kuspit, as a revival of traditional themes of self-expression in European art after decades of American dominance. The social and economic value of the movement was hotly debated. From the point of view of the history of Modern Art, art critic Robert Hughes dismissed neo-expressionist painting as retrograde, as a failure of radical imagination, and as a lamentable capitulation to the art market.

Critics such as Benjamin Buchloh, Hal Foster, Craig Owens, and Mira Schor were highly critical of its relation to the marketability of painting on the rapidly expanding art market, celebrity, the backlash against feminism, anti-intellectualism, and a return to mythic subjects and individualist methods they deemed outmoded. Women were notoriously marginalized in the movement, and painters such as Elizabeth Murray and Maria Lassnig were omitted from many of its key exhibitions, most notoriously the 1981 New Spirit in Painting exhibition in London which included 38 male painters but no female painters.

== Neo-expressionism around the world ==
The movement became known as Transavanguardia in Italy and Neue Wilden in Germany, and the group Figuration Libre was formed in France in 1981. In Toronto, the group known as ChromaZone/Chromatique Collective was formed in 1981 and existed till 1986.

== Key neo-expressionist painters ==
- Georg Baselitz
- Jean-Michel Basquiat
- Sandro Chia
- Enzo Cucchi
- Francesco Clemente
- Eric Fischl
- Philip Guston
- Anselm Kiefer
- Robert Longo
- Rick Prol
- Julian Schnabel

== See also ==
- Abstract expressionism
- Black Abstractionism
- Expressionism
- Postmodernism
- Postmodern art
- New European Painting
