= Joseph (art model) =

Haitian artist's model

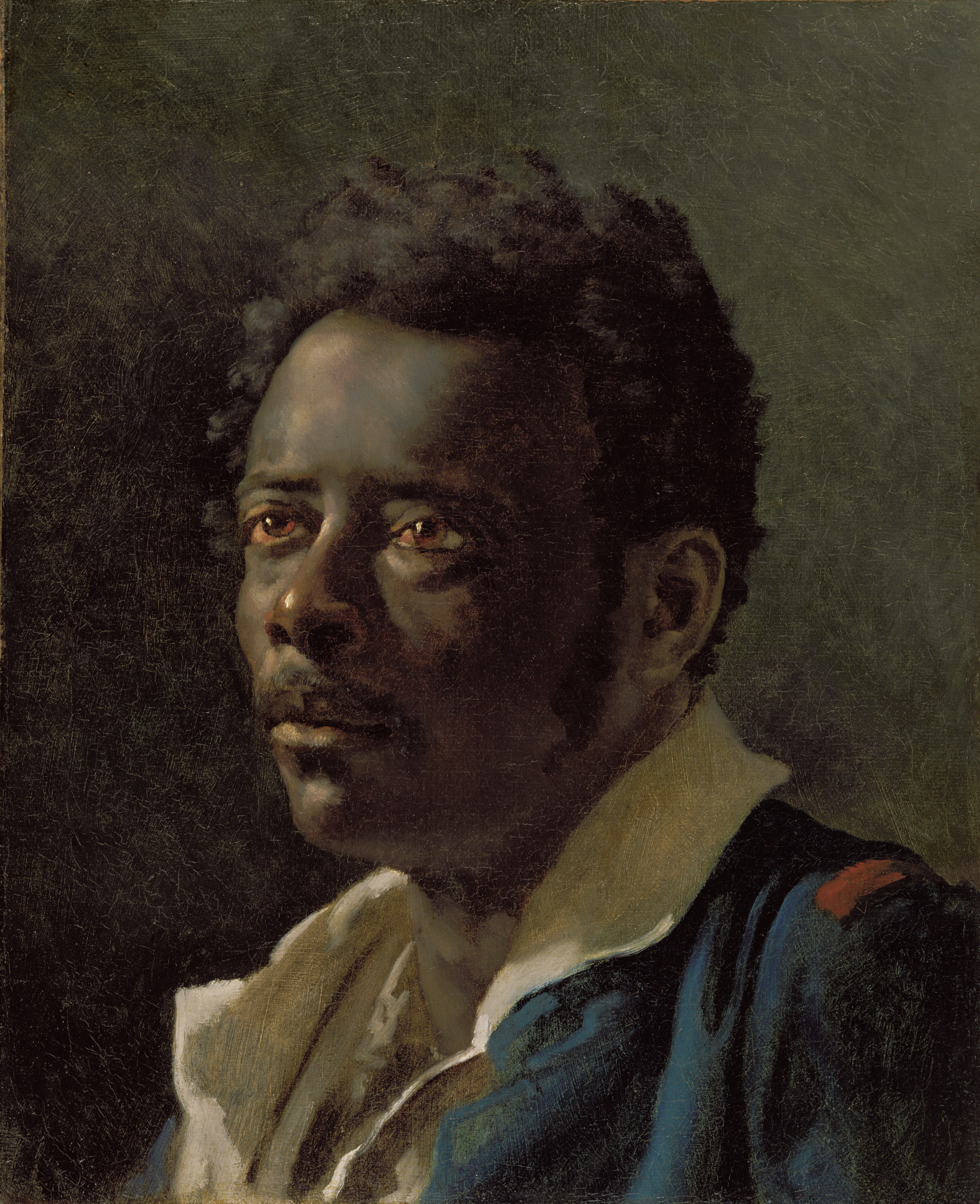
- Portrait study by Théodore Géricault, c. 1818–1819
- Born: c. 1793; French Saint-Domingue
- Died: Estimated late 1860s or early 1870s Paris, Second French Empire
- Occupations: Art model; acrobat; actor
- Years active: 1818–1860s
- Known for: The Raft of the Medusa

Joseph (French: [ʒozef]), also known as Joseph le nègre (c. 1793 – unknown), was a 19th-century Haitian acrobat and actor who is best known as an art model. Active primarily in Paris, Joseph is remembered for his professional relationship with the French Romantic painter Théodore Géricault for whom he served as a principal model for the painting The Raft of the Medusa (1819).

Having left Haiti in the aftermath of the Haitian Revolution, Joseph arrived in Marseille around 1804 and moved to Paris in 1808. He made a living as an acrobat and actor before being hired by Géricault sometime in 1818. After the success of The Raft of the Medusa at the 1819 Paris Salon, Joseph began to model for other contemporary French artists, including Théodore Chassériau, Horace Vernet, and Adolphe Brune.

In 1832, Joseph became one of only three male models employed at the École des Beaux-Arts in Paris. Despite a relatively successful career, Joseph never achieved broader recognition beyond the artistic circles of Paris. Similarly to other people of color living in 19th-century France, his professional life was conditioned by the political and social consequences of French colonialism and marred by racial discrimination.

== Early life and work ==
=== Haiti and France (1793–1818) ===
Joseph's family name has not been recorded, although it is believed that he was born in the French colony of Saint-Domingue, present-day Haiti, around 1793. He arrived in France in or around 1804 and first settled in Marseille. By 1808, Joseph had moved to Paris where he was hired as an acrobat and actor for Madame Saqui's troupe. Joseph was one of the many immigrants who had left Haiti in the aftermath of the 1791–1804 Haitian Revolution and the subsequent abolition of slavery in the French colonies (which lasted from 1794 until 1802, when Napoleon reinstated it). A 2023 digital exhibition by the J. Paul Getty Museum suggests that he lived in the 9th or 17th arrondissement like many other immigrants and those involved in the arts, including Laure, a Black female model who worked with Édouard Manet.

=== The Raft of the Medusa (1818–1819) ===
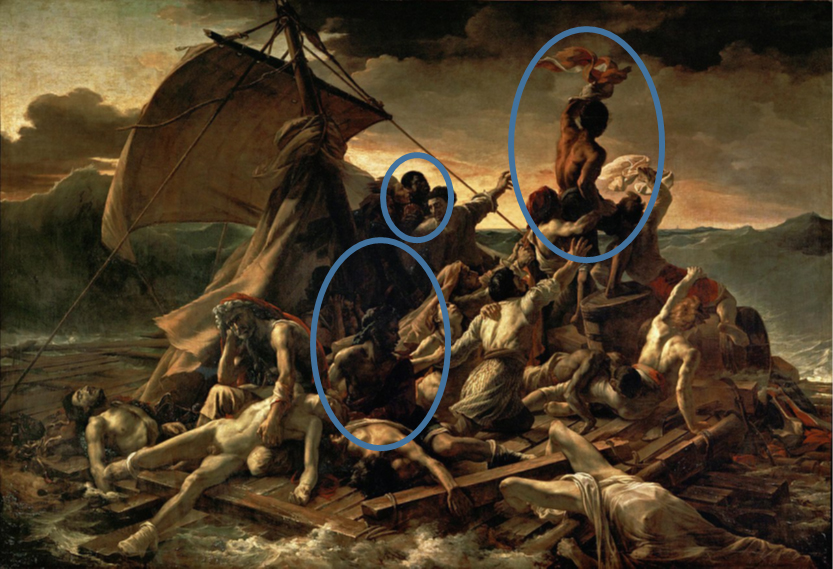
Annotated version of The Raft of the Medusa (1819) by Théodore Géricault, showing figures said to have been modeled by Joseph.

Joseph gained recognition after serving as a principal model for Géricault's The Raft of the Medusa, an 1818–1819 painting depicting a moment from the aftermath of the wreck of the French naval frigate Méduse, which ran aground off the coast of today's Mauritania on 2 July 1816. Joseph, whom Géricault had first encountered during an acrobatic show, was hired as a model shortly after the artist began working on The Raft of the Medusa in 1818. (Note: Géricault rented a studio in the Quartier du Faubourg-du-Roule in Paris in summer 1818 and began working on The Raft of the Medusa at that time. Tinterow (1990–1991), p. 44) According to some accounts, only one of the fifteen survivors on the raft, a soldier named Jean Charles, was Black. (Note: "Only one Black soldier survived the 13 days at sea, succumbing later to his wounds after being rescued." Bar (2017)) Several art historians and critics have argued, however, that Géricault included three Black individuals in the composition. All are said to have been modeled after Joseph.

Most notably, Joseph served as a model for the man assumed to be Jean Charles, waving a dark red handkerchief in hopes of being noticed by the passing ship. Influenced by an ancient Greek Classical sculpture titled Belvedere Torso and with his back turned toward the viewer, Joseph's silhouette is placed atop the pyramidal grouping of survivors in the composition's right half. During the same time, Géricault completed a study of the model's back.

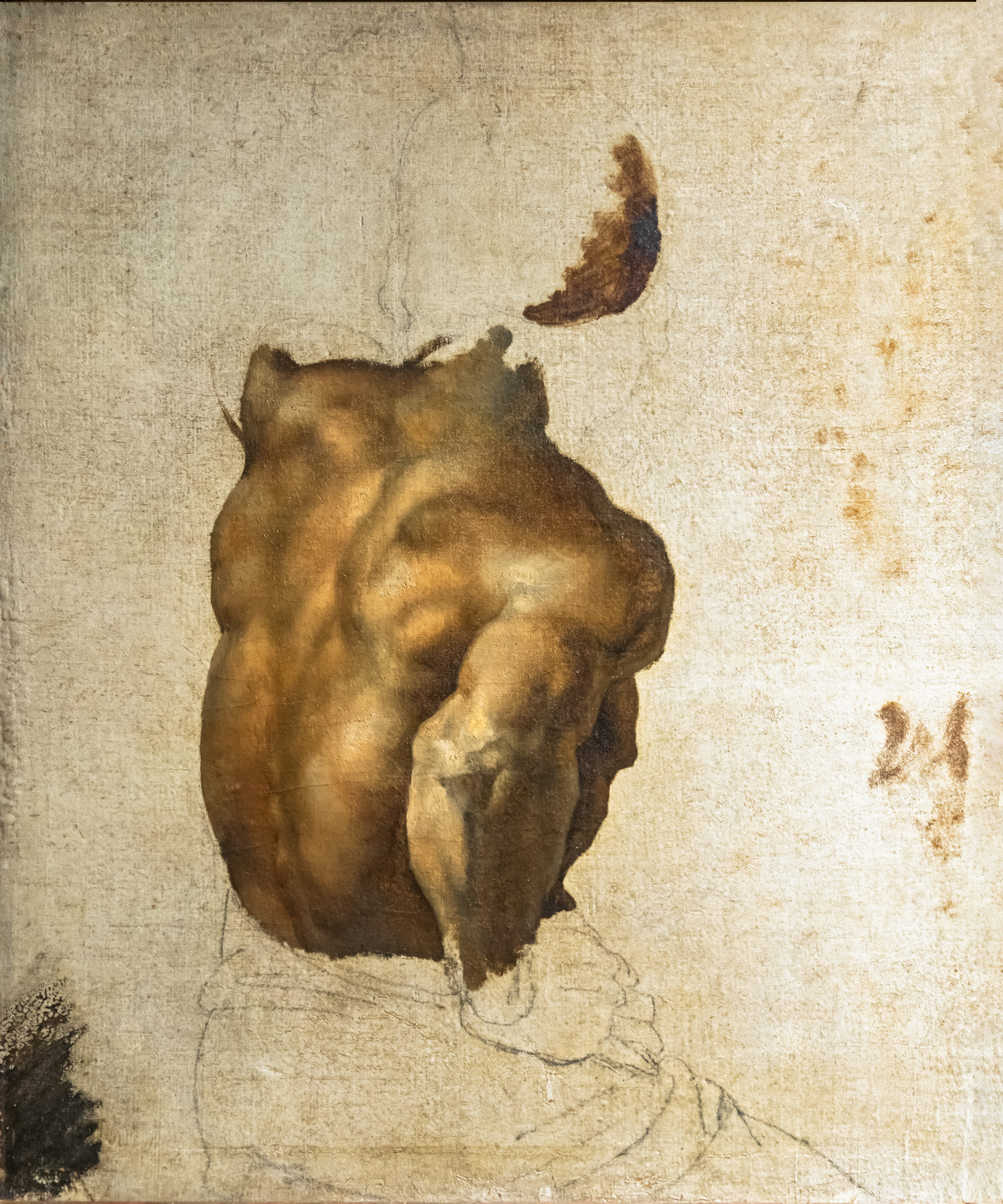
Théodore Géricault, Back study (after the Joseph model) for "Le Radeau de La Méduse" 1818–1819, Ingres Museum, Montauban

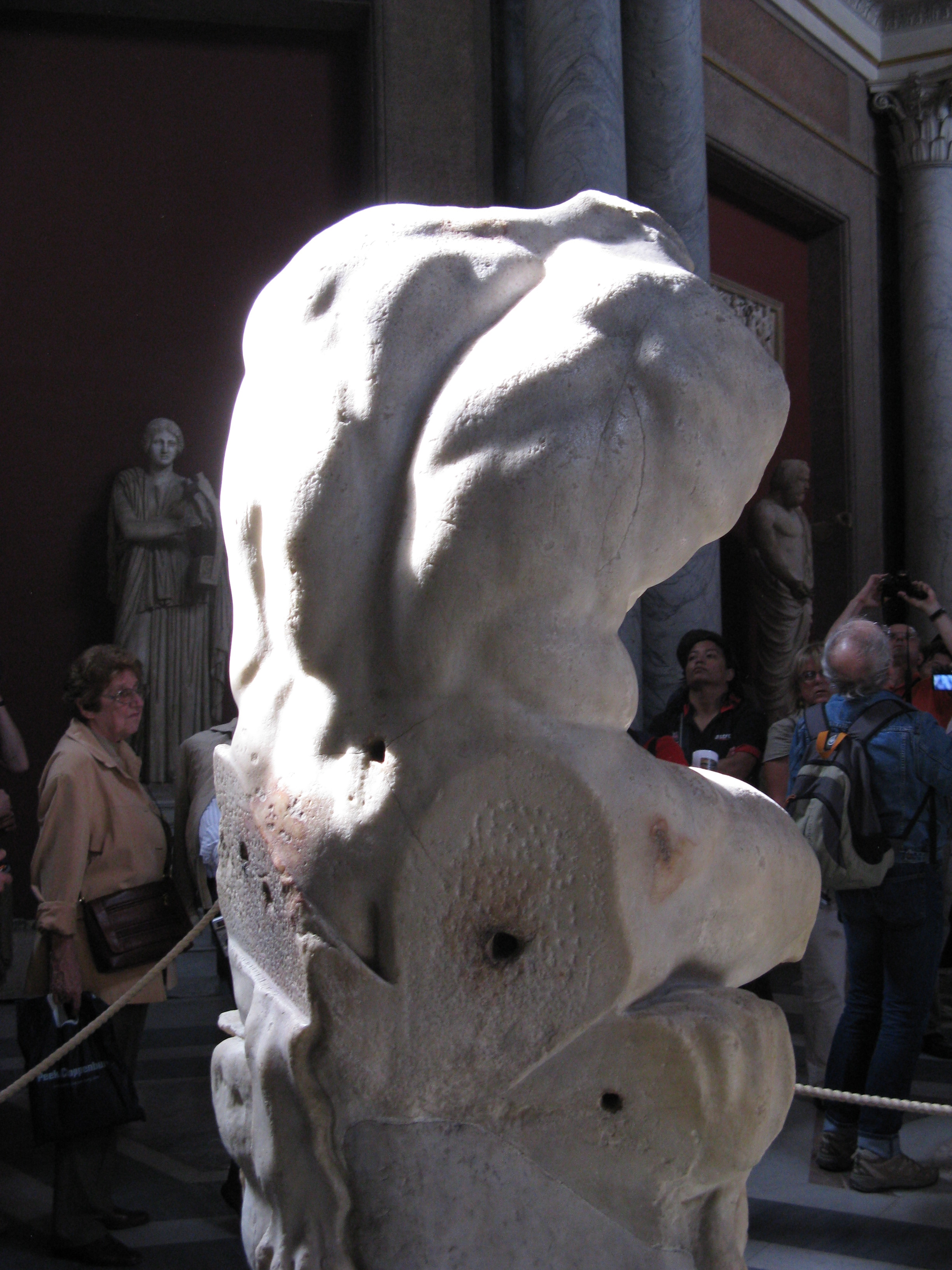
Belvedere Torso, fragment of a Neo-Attic sculpture from the 1st century CE, which is said to have served as an inspiration for Géricault's depiction of Joseph. Vatican Museums, Vatican City.

The artist also incorporated a small rendering of Joseph's face in the composition. Looking at the viewer, he is flanked by two White men placed to the right of the wooden mast. Around the same time Géricault painted The Raft of the Medusa, the artist also completed a portrait study of Joseph, dressed in military uniform, in a manner consistent with tête d'étude, or a head study, an established tradition in the French studio practice wherein a portrait of an individual is painted for possible use in large-scale compositions. In doing so, the painter represents the subject "with a directness and immediacy that is often lacking in formal portraiture".

Joseph has been described as Géricault's favorite model and the artist is said to have admired him as an individual, a sentiment art historians suggest is reflected in the deeply personal approach to the 1818–1819 portrait. When discussing the study, the British artist and writer Peter Brathwaite emphasizes Géricault's attention to detail in portraying a person of color and suggests that the viewer is invited into the "world of an actual, distinct person". Moreover, it has been suggested that Joseph served as inspiration for a third individual included in The Raft of the Medusa, a man seen seated in the middle of the composition directly in front of the mast.

=== Joseph and abolitionism ===
Géricault identified as an abolitionist and his decision to include representations of Black people in The Raft of the Medusa has been interpreted as a political statement against slavery and French colonialism. Art historian Albert Alhadeff, pointing to "strong antipathy" towards people of color among the general French public during the early 19th century, called the artist's inclusion of Black individuals in the painting an "extraordinary burst of fearless independence". Surviving accounts indicate that the decision was controversial. An Italian art model known as Cadamour, who also posed for The Raft of the Medusa, was allegedly "scandalized" that Géricault had decided to hire a Black model.

Art historians Klaus Berger and Diane Chalmers Johnson note that Géricault made the individual modeled on Joseph the "focal point of the drama, the strongest and most perceptive of the survivors, in a sense the 'hero of the scene'". They argue that the artist's choice to do so was not a "last-minute" decision as evidenced by early sketches for the work, including the portrait study, and point to Géricault's concerns regarding the "extreme cruelties" of illegal slave trade in the French colonies. Echoing this sentiment, the Congolese writer and artist Bona Mangangu describes Joseph's Black body as "powerful, in good health, rising above the White bodies, survivors of the raft weakened by disease and fatigue". (Note: "C'est un corps noir, puissant, en bonne santé, qui s'élève au-dessus des corps blancs, survivants du radeau affaiblis par la maladie et la fatigue. Le symbole est très fort." Combis (2019)) According to Côme Fabre, a curator at the Louvre, Paris where Géricault's painting is on permanent display, the artist "wanted to show the equality of man when facing terror and death".

== Later career ==
=== Paris Academy (1830s) ===
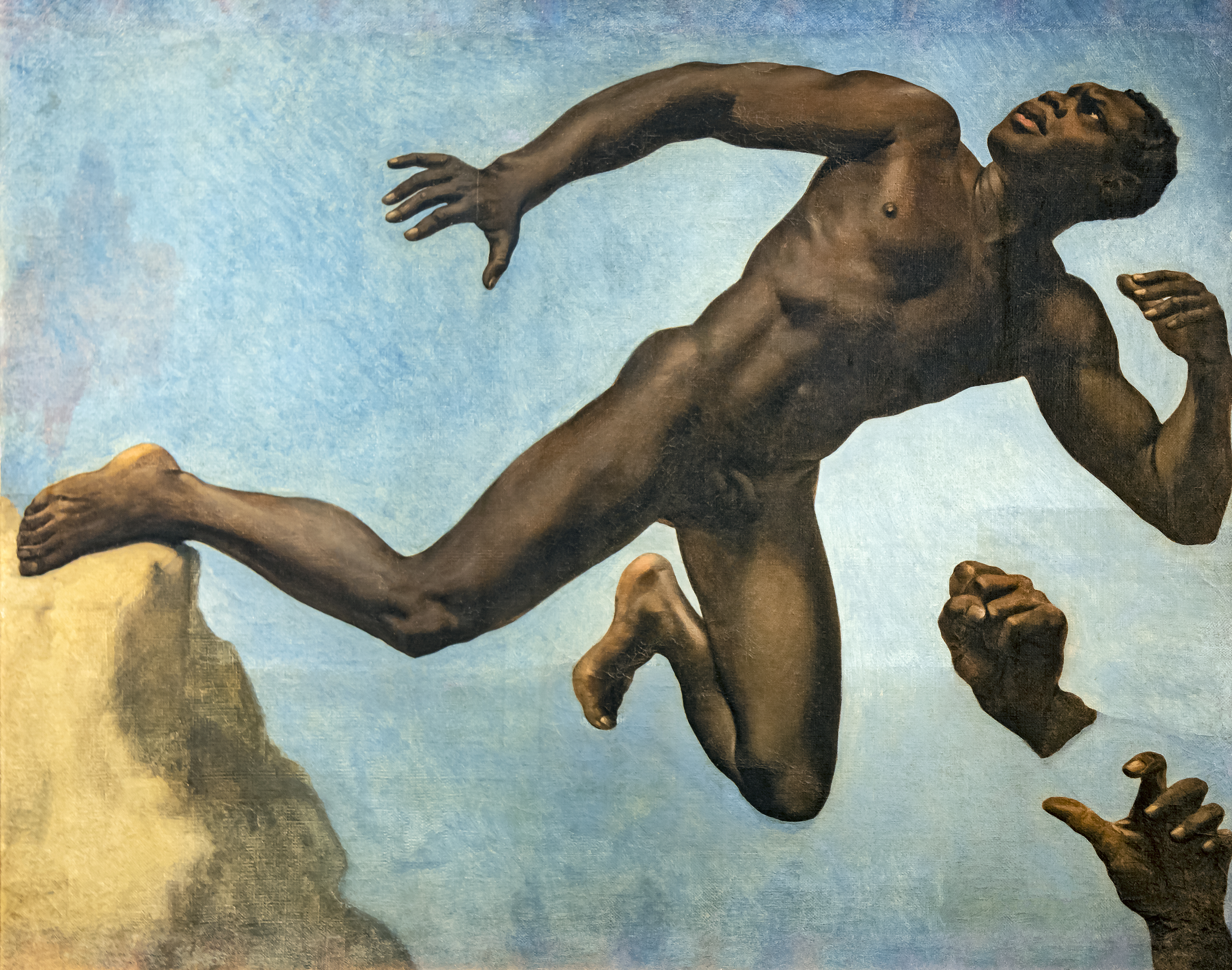
Théodore Chassériau, Study for Negro, oil on canvas, 1839, Musée Ingres Bourdelle

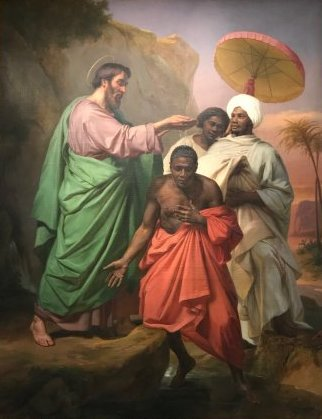
Abel de Pujol, Saint Philip Baptizing the Eunuch of the Queen of Ethiopia, oil on canvas, 1848, Musée des beaux-arts de Valenciennes

Adolphe Brune, Joseph, le nègre, oil on canvas, 1865, Musée de Cahors Henri-Martin

In 1832, Joseph was hired at the École des Beaux-Arts in Paris, becoming one of only three male models. He held the position until at least 1835. When discussing Joseph's career, scholar Emmelyn Butterfield-Rosen notes that in 19th-century France "the body of a life model functioned as a floating signifier, assuming different meanings when inserted into different compositional contexts" and in the case of Joseph, it was almost always conditioned by the cultural connotations Europeans "attached to his skin pigment".

In a study requested by Jean-Auguste-Dominique Ingres in 1836 and completed in 1839, the painter Théodore Chassériau shows Joseph floating against the sky and next to two small hand studies. At the time of its completion, Butterfield-Rosen says, neither the model nor the artist (who was a grandson of a Haitian landowner of mixed race) was made aware that Ingres had planned to use Joseph in a religious composition Christ Expelling Satan from the Holy Mountain and depict him as "the devil cast down from the mountaintop". In a painting by Abel de Pujol completed in 1848 and drawing upon a Biblical subject matter, Joseph is depicted as a eunuch of the Queen of Ethiopia being baptized by Saint Philip.

=== Late years (1840s–1860s) ===
Joseph went on to pose for other prominent French artists, including Horace Vernet, Alfred de Dreux, and Adolphe Brune. Surviving records indicate that he was primarily admired for his physique, which contemporary artists perceived as impressive and visually attractive. An article from the French newspaper Le Figaro published in 1858 described Joseph as "the most beautiful model who ran the ateliers of Paris" and said that there was not a single French "artist, painter or sculptor who does not know Joseph". (Note: "Il n'est pas en France un seul artiste peintre ou sculpteur qui ne connaisse Joseph le nègre, le plus beau modèle qui ait couru les ateliers de Paris." 'Un modèle philosophe', Le Figaro, 1858. Mourgues (2019))

At the same time, Alhadeff suggests that surviving contemporary accounts of Joseph—including a derogatory 1840 passage by the French writer Émile de La Bédollière where the model is portrayed as a "clown who can barely sit still" and reduced to a "familiar caricature"—point to the continued perception of Black people as that of an inferior race. (Note: "For how could you think otherwise, that a [Black] from Haiti, burned by the tropical sun, is going to stand still ... No; before you, his face suddenly breaks out into a broad grin ... he's recounting stories, he laughs at the top of his voice, a full throated roar; he longs for his birthplace; [posing in the studio and] warmed by the heat of the stove, he dreams of the Antilles and its warmth, and with the odors rising from the glowing sheet-ironed stoves and the oils around him, he breathes the perfume of the orange trees." Émile de La Bédollière (1840), Le Modèle. English translation after Alhadeff (2020)) Despite his success in the art circles of Paris, Joseph was not broadly recognized and, similarly to other people of color, continued to face systemic racism in France even after slavery had finally been abolished in 1848. Bona Mangangu further explains that art modeling was considered a "vile profession" ("vil métier") which usually paid an average of three francs per session, a relatively small amount.

Among the late surviving depictions of Joseph is a painting by Brune, likely painted during the 1840s, which was exhibited at the 1865 academic salon in Paris. (Note: The painting is listed among the works exhibited at the 1865 Paris Salon. See Almanach de la littérature du théatre et des beaux-arts. Paris: Pagnerre, 1865, p. 68. However, Nayrolles estimates the painting was made in the 1840s. Nayrolles (2010)) In this composition, Joseph is seen with his torso exposed, seated against a natural backdrop and holding a porcelain cup while smiling. According to scholar Jean Nayrolles, Brune's late composition continues to perpetuate racial stereotypes through the subject's "anthropological gaze" ("le regard anthropologique"), associating the Black body with the state of "benevolent" ("bienveillante") nature and sexuality.

Toward the end of his life and career, Joseph worked at the studio of the Swiss artist Charles Gleyre with whom he had become friends while living in Paris. His exact death date is unknown, although it is estimated he died sometime in the late 1860s or early 1870s.

== Legacy ==
In 2019, an exhibition titled Le Modèle noir, de Géricault à Matisse (Black Models: From Géricault to Matisse) at the Musée d'Orsay in Paris, which focused on representation of the Black body in French modern art, included paintings of Joseph by Brune and Chassériau, among others. The show was an expanded version of Posing Modernity: The Black Model from Manet and Matisse to Today, a 2018 exhibition organized by Denise Murrell at the Wallach Art Gallery at Columbia University in New York. In 2021, French writer Arnaud Beunaiche published Je suis Joseph, a fictionalized biographical account of the model. It premiered as a theatrical play at L'Imaginaire in Douchy-les-Mines in February 2022. In 2023, the Getty Museum in Los Angeles organized a digital exhibition via the Google Arts & Culture platform titled Study of the Model Joseph, Nineteenth-Century Paris, and Romanticism and dedicated entirely to Joseph.

== See also ==
- Fanny Eaton
- Laure (art model)

== Sources ==
- Ahdifard, Unita (9 February 2023). "Joseph: A Celebrated Haitian Model in 19th-Century Paris". Getty News & Stories. J. Paul Getty Trust. Archived from the original on 12 February 2023.
- Alhadeff, Albert (2020). "Quotidian Portraits". Théodore Géricault. Painting Black Bodies: Confrontations and Contradictions. New York: Routledge. ISBN 978-0-367-31333-3.
- Allan, Scott; Gasparotto, Davide; Kerber, Peter Björn; Woollett, Anne T. (2019). Masterpieces of Painting: J. Paul Getty Museum. Los Angeles: J. Paul Getty Museum. ISBN 978-1-60606-579-2.
- Allen, Denise Maria (2003). Masterpieces of Painting in the J. Paul Getty Museum (5th ed.). Los Angeles: J. Paul Getty Museum. ISBN 0-89236-709-1. OCLC 51294110.
- Apollo: A Journal of the Arts. Vol. 11–12. London: Apollo Press. 1930.
- Bailey, Colin B. (19 December 2019). "In Plain Sight". The New York Review of Books. Vol. 66, no. 20. pp. 59–63. Archived from the original on 26 March 2023.
- Bar, Roni (6 February 2017). "Cannibalism, Insanity and Class Warfare: The Tragedy Behind 'The Raft of the Medusa' Painting". Haaretz. Archived from the original on 25 September 2022.
- Berger, Klaus; Johnson, Diane Chalmers (1969). "Art as Confrontation: The Black Man in the Work of Gericault". The Massachusetts Review. 10 (2): 301–340. ISSN 0025-4878. JSTOR 25087857. Archived from the original on 15 February 2023.
- Bindman, David; Gates, Henry Louis Jr., eds. (2012). "Studies". The Image of the Black in Western Art. Cambridge, Massachusetts: Harvard University Press. ISBN 978-0-674-05271-0.
- Black McCoy, Claire (27 May 2021). "Théodore Géricault, Raft of the Medusa". Smarthistory. Archived from the original on 11 February 2023.
- Brathwaite, Peter (2023). Rediscovering Black Portraiture. Cheryl Finley, Temi Odumosu, Mark Sealy (contributors). Los Angeles: Getty Publications. ISBN 978-1-60606-816-8.
- Butterfield-Rosen, Emmelyn (October 2019). "The Modern Woman: Emmelyn Butterfield-Rosen on 'Posing Modernity' and 'Black Models'". Artforum. Vol. 58, no. 2. pp. 188–201. Archived from the original on 1 March 2023.
- Combis, Hélène (22 March 2019). "Qui était Joseph, modèle noir du Radeau de la Méduse?" [Who was Joseph, black model of the Raft of the Medusa?]. France Culture (in French). Interview with Bona Mangangu. Archived from the original on 11 February 2023.
- Doridou-Heim, Anne (13 May 2019). "Black Models". Gazette Drouot. Archived from the original on 6 March 2023.
- Hagen, Rose-Marie; Hagen, Rainer (2005). What Great Paintings Say: From the Bayeux Tapestry to Diego Rivera. Köln: Taschen. ISBN 3-8228-4790-9.
- "Study of the Model Joseph, Nineteenth-Century Paris, and Romanticism" (Online exhibition). Los Angeles: J. Paul Getty Museum. 2023. Archived from the original on 10 February 2023 – via Google Arts & Culture.
- Lathers, Marie (2001). "Changing Tastes". In Jiminez, Jill Berk; Banham, Joanna (eds.). Dictionary of Artists' Models. London: Fitzroy Dearborn. ISBN 1-57958-233-8.
- "Je suis Joseph. Cie l'Emporte-Voix". L'Imaginaire (in French). 29 December 2021. Archived from the original on 11 March 2023.
- Mourgues, Elsa (22 March 2019). "Joseph ou le renouveau du modèle noir au XIXe" [Joseph or the Revival of the Black Model in the 19th Century]. France Culture (in French). Archived from the original on 11 February 2023.
- "Adolphe Brune, 'Joseph, le nègre', 2nd half of the 19th century". Musées Occitanie (in French). Archived from the original on 16 March 2023.
- Nayrolles, Jean (1 April 2010). "Le nègre Joseph. Trois images du Noir". Midi-Pyrénées Patrimoine (in French). Archived from the original on 26 October 2020.
- Peck, Aaron (22 June 2019). "Reframing the Black Model at the Musée d'Orsay". The New York Review of Books. Archived from the original on 6 March 2023.
- Pludermacher, Isolde (2019). "Joseph". In Debray, Cécile; Guégan, Stéphane; Murrell, Denise M.; Pludermacher, Isolde (eds.). Le modèle noir: de Géricault à Matisse (Exhibition catalogue) (in French). Paris: Musée d'Orsay and Flammarion. pp. 84–91. ISBN 978-2-08-148096-4.
- Snell, Robert (2018). Portraits of the Insane: Théodore Géricault and the Subject of Psychotherapy. London: Routledge. ISBN 978-0-429-47840-6. OCLC 1029237276.
- Solly, Meilan (27 March 2019). "Musée d'Orsay Renames Manet's 'Olympia' and Other Works in Honor of Their Little-Known Black Models". Smithsonian Magazine. Archived from the original on 10 February 2023.
- Tinterow, Gary (Winter 1990–1991). "Gericault's Heroic Landscapes: The Times of Day". The Metropolitan Museum of Art Bulletin. 48 (3).
