= Reclining Nayar lady =

Painting by Raja Ravi Varma

Reclining Nair lady
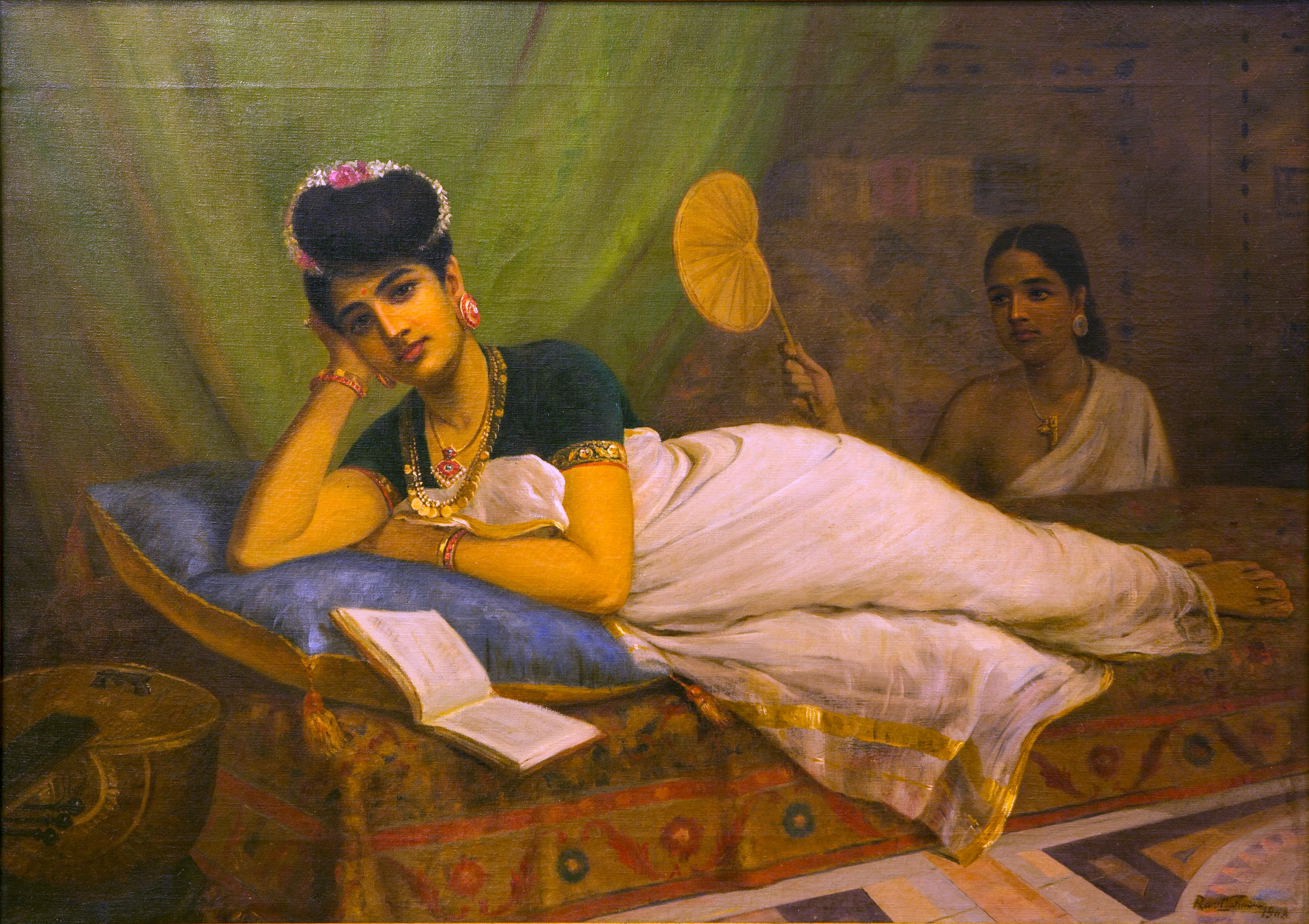
- Artist: Raja Ravi Varma
- Year: 1902
- Type: Oil on Canvas
- Dimensions: 73.66 cm × 104.14 cm (29.00 in × 41.00 in)

A Reclining Nair lady is a 1902 painting by the Indian artist Raja Ravi Varma. The painting features a recumbent Nair woman, with a book open in front of her while attended by a maid. The painting was inspired by Edward Manet's 1863 painting Olympia.
