= Klaus Berger =

Klaus Berger may refer to:

- Klaus Berger (art historian) (1901–2000), German art historian
- Klaus Berger (theologian) (1940–2020), German theologian
