= Bali-og =

Traditional layered necklaces of various ethnic groups

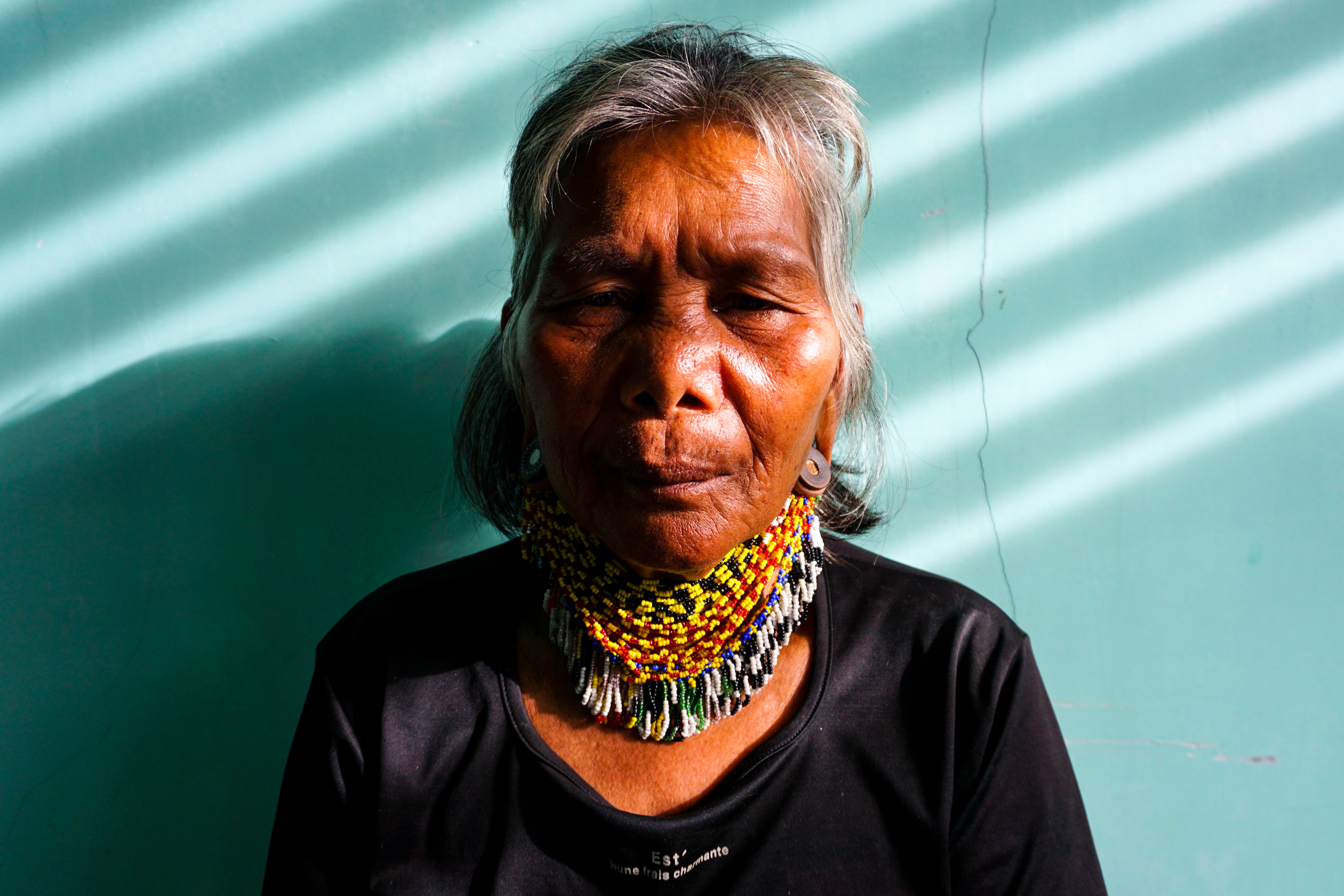
A Manobo woman from Bukidnon with a ginibang bali-og

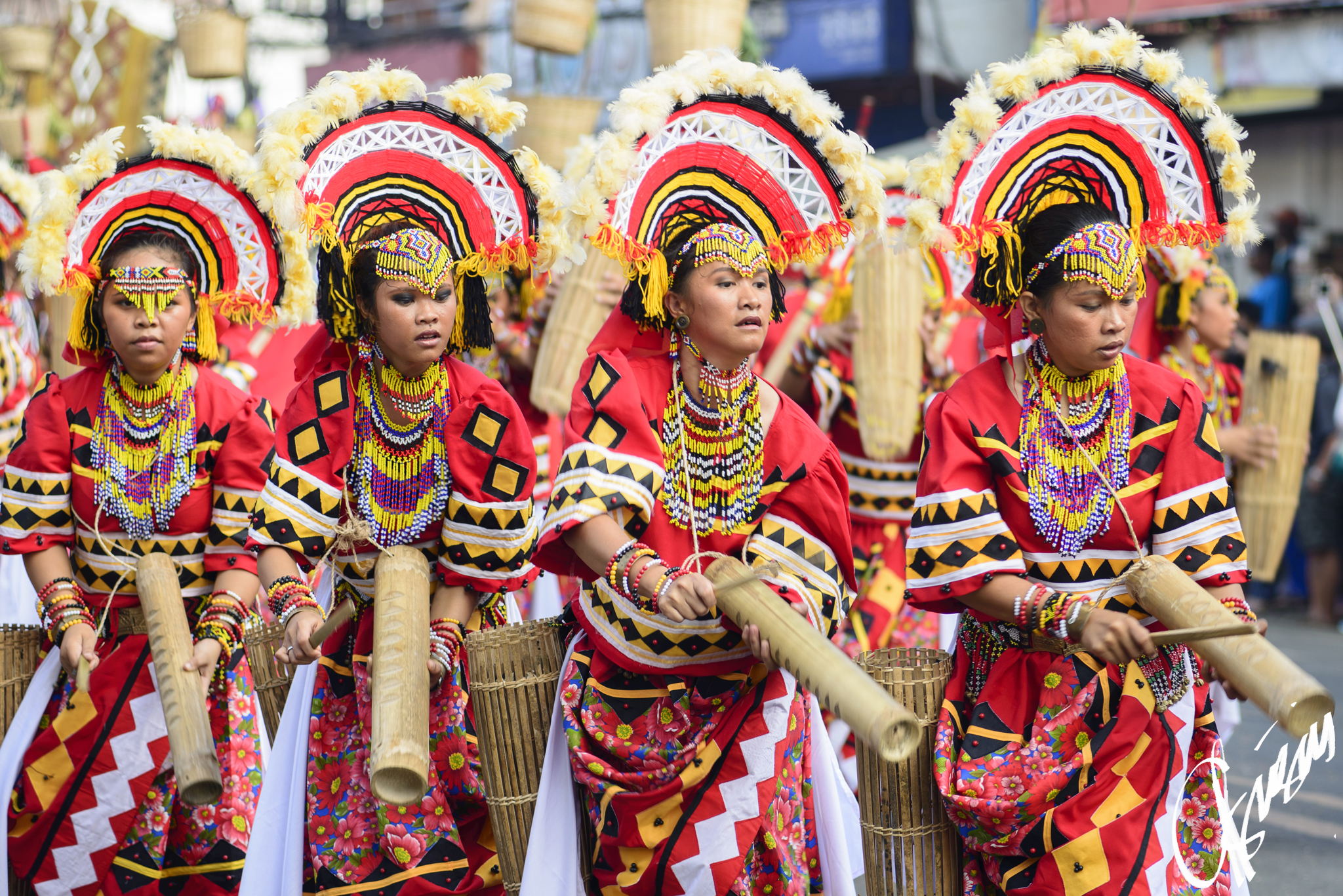
Dancers in full Higaonon traditional attire with bali-og necklaces during the Kaamulan Festival of Bukidnon

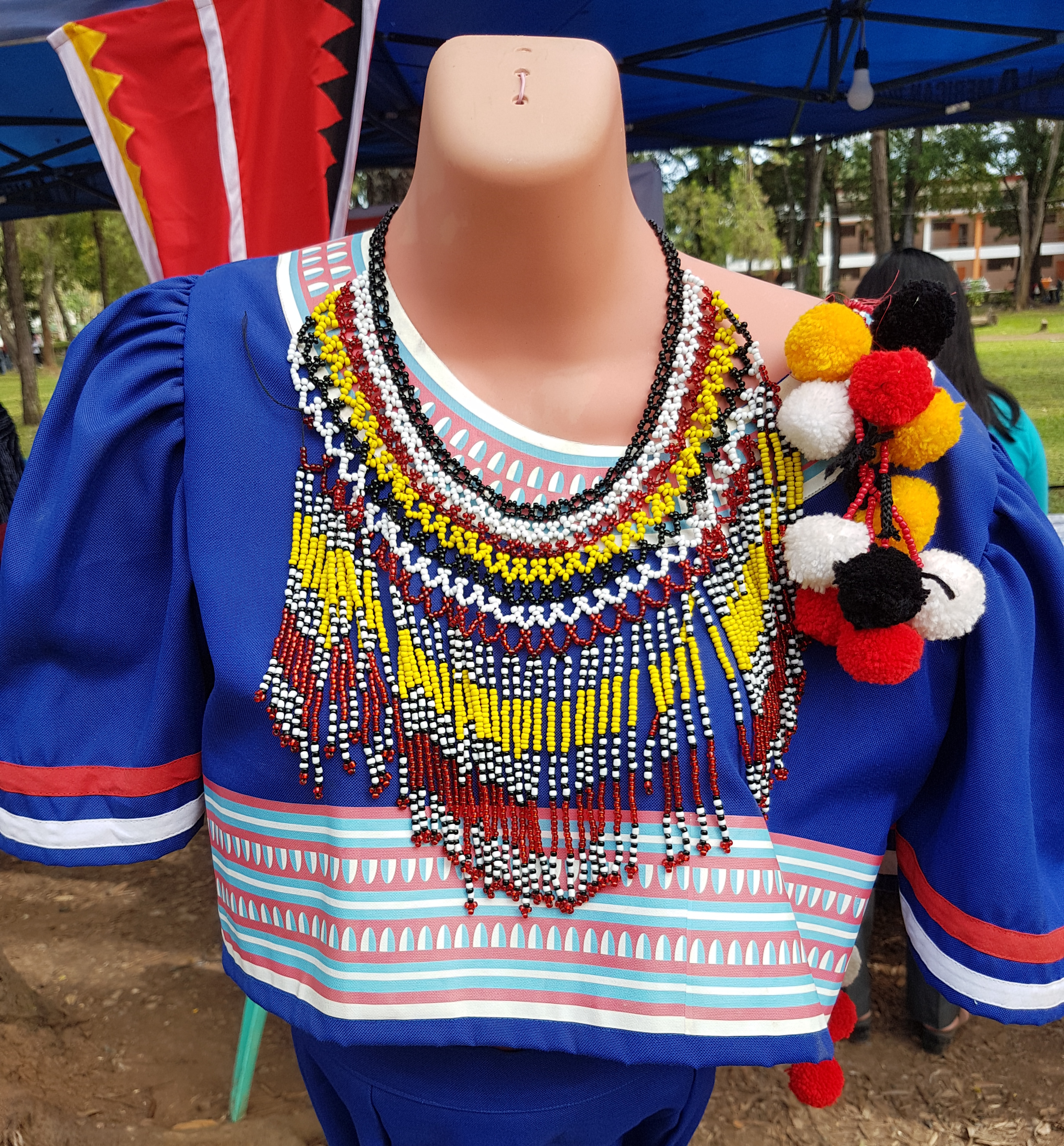
Umayamnon traditional attire with bali-og necklace and headdress

Bali-og, also spelled baliog, are traditional layered necklaces of various ethnic groups in the islands of Visayas and Mindanao in the Philippines. They consist of chokers and necklaces with a fringe of beads and other ornaments. More than one is usually worn, layered over each other. Their elements usually consist of metal or glass beads, hollowed seeds, seashells, mother-of-pearl, and copper or brass ornaments.

== Types ==
=== Lumad ===
Among the various Lumad peoples of Mindanao, particularly the inter-related Manobo groups, bali-og are bead necklaces composed chokers and necklaces fastened around the neck. A fringe of more beads and other ornaments (including copper or brass bells, amulets, and shells) are then attached to the lower edge of the chokers. The wearing of beadwork among the various Manobo tribes is culturally very important. The number, colors, and patterns vary by tribe and by status. The largest type of bali-og is a women's necklace called as ginibang. Its name means "monitor lizard" due to the resemblance of the patterns to monitor lizard scales.

=== Suludnon ===
Among the Visayan Suludnon people of Panay, bali-og are similar in construction to Mindanao bali-og but are instead made from strips of cloth with traditional embroidery known as panubok. They also have a fringe made of beads attached to coins.

== Archaeology ==
In Surigao del Sur, a similar necklace was found in the "Surigao Hoard" in 1981. It consists of several layered collars with a fringe of successively smaller beads. It is made entirely of gold and has been dated to the 9th to 10th century AD. It has been named the tutubi ("dragonfly") collar, due to the resemblance of the fringes to dragonfly bodies. It is currently part of the collection of the museum of the Bangko Sentral ng Pilipinas.

== See also ==
- Agimat
