= Oppositional gaze =

Sociopolitical concept coined by bell hooks

The oppositional gaze is a term coined by bell hooks in the 1992 essay The Oppositional Gaze: Black Female Spectators that refers to the power of looking. According to hooks, an oppositional gaze is a way that a Black person in a subordinate position communicates their status. hooks' essay is a work of feminist film theory that discusses the male gaze, Michel Foucault, and white feminism in film theory.

== Background ==
In the 1992 essay "The Oppositional Gaze: Black Female Spectators", hooks describes the gaze of a black body as repressed, denied, and interrogating. She argues that gaze became an act of rebellion during the era of American slavery when slave-owners often punished slaves for simply looking at them. Through critical discussion around black women and cinema, the oppositional gaze enters as a way for black people to attain agency to combat white supremacy. As a result of the racist portrayals of black people in white-dominated cinema, independent black film arose. However, hooks notes that black male filmmakers represented black women in their films as objects of male gaze which inherently perpetuated white supremacy, as the black female body was presented only to enhance and maintain white womanhood as an object of the phallocentric gaze.

The concept was first developed as a lens of critical theory for black women to apply when watching cinema.

The oppositional gaze encompasses modes of looking that employ reflexive gazes, including male, feminine, and phallocentric gazes.

=== The male gaze ===
The oppositional gaze is direct rejection of Laura Mulvey's Visual Pleasure and Narrative Cinema (1975). Mulvey's text analyses Lacan's mirror stage within film, concluding that subjectivity is "the birth of the long love affair/ despair between image and self-image which has found such intensity of expression in film and such joyous recognition in the cinema audience". She furthers this point by criticizing the "male movie star's glamorous characteristics" as not subject to an objectifying gaze, but rather a more powerful stance as the 'ideal ego' developed in the beginning stages of recognition in front of the mirror. Mulvey defines the "split between active/ male and passive/ female" as the pleasure in looking through which the determining male gaze stylizes the female figure. hooks rebuts this claim stating, "Black female spectators 'actively' chose not to identify with the film's imaginary subject because such identification was disenabling".

The concept of seeing one's self in opposition to the "ideal ego" must begin with recognition of one's body as comparably different. Black female representation in film exists primarily in opposition to the white woman's body. Thus, black women often remain in search of a mirror stage because they metaphorically have yet to see true representations of themselves. hooks gives an example of this rare recognition through two characters in the film Passion of Remembrance. She writes, "Dressing to go to a party, Louise and Maggie claim the 'gaze'. Looking at one another, staring in mirrors, they appear completely focused on their encounter with black femaleness."

Mulvey's criticisms present exclusionary perspectives which inundate the white female body as a totalizing categorization of all women. Not only is the representation of Black women significantly marginalized within film but they are further misrepresented as stereotyped objects to which the male gaze is rarely, if ever applied. This concept leads hooks to ask: "Are we really to imagine that feminist theorists writing only about images of white women... do not 'see' the whiteness of the image?"

The oppositional gaze serves as "a gesture of resistance" to not only the male gaze but also toward the oppression of minorities through cinema by the all-inclusive gendering of woman. This gaze criticizes the doubling effect of objectification by "turning away [as] one way to protest, to reject negation".

=== Feminine gaze ===
Judith Butler theorizes the feminine gaze as "a pervasive heterosexism in feminist theory". In their essay "The Question of Social Transformation", Butler states: "Through performativity, dominant and nondominant gender norms are equalized. But some of those performative accomplishments claim the place of nature or claim the place of symbolic necessity". These theories criticize the male gaze and its objectification of "women" as it predominantly excludes more than just the Black oppositional gaze but further problematizes the subjectivity of gendering male verses female. Furthermore, "woman" as a heterogeneous sex object functions for and within the patriarchy, reinforcing "white supremacist capitalist imperialist dominating 'gaze.'"

"Transparent creator Jill Soloway spoke about the challenge of defining the female gaze at the Toronto International Film Festival. She argued that the female gaze is really about using the presence of a female perspective on-screen to emphasize the story's emotions and characters." Many female filmmakers use styles and themes that make fun of the male gaze, and give perspective on the female experience. Patty Jenkins' Wonder Woman shows Diana (Gal Gadot) making fun of the clothing sold to women in 1918 as she attempts to find a disguise. This scene depicts a woman expressing frustration at the impracticality of women's fashion. Jane Campion's The Piano takes a different approach and expresses female sexuality and the art of seduction in a way that is quite different to the typical over sexualized and "sleazy" style that is often found in films.

The objective of the female gaze is not simply to change the narrative of objectification and focus the lens on men, but rather to demonstrate how women think and feel. Forster explains that the female gaze in cinema encourages the audience and spectators to resonate with the women on screen, and attempt to feel what they feel. Forster describes that while sexual violence against women is a very serious issue, it is the use of the female gaze in certain films and scenes that changes how the viewers understand it. A rape scene in The Handmaid's Tale depicts Elizabeth Moss disengaging from what is happening to her as she stares at the ceiling. The focus of the camera on her face during these moments forces the spectators and audience to experience that moment with her.

=== Phallocentric gaze ===
The phallocentric gaze is defined as "the obsession and focus of study on the male genitals."

== Oppositional gaze aiding identity development ==
There has been research encouraging elementary schools to teach the "oppositional gaze" to adolescent black girls early on so that they can develop "critical consciousness" from a young age in order to aid with positive identity development in a world whose systems marginalize them and whose media depicts them negatively. In an ethnographic study of students of color at a public high school in Washington, D.C., a Fordham study found that Black girls often found themselves succeeding and being rewarded for being "silent and invisible in the eyes of teachers and administrators". Fordham analyzes this to mean that by being silent, Black girls are "passing" as adolescent white students, therefore succeeding.

The author claims that schools should avoid reproducing these negative messages and aim for teaching tools that deconstruct and push-back oppressive narratives that surround Black girls and women. According to Charlotte Jacobs, having the right lenses to view the media that surrounds them while they are growing up is important for them to learn how to discern the negative stereotypes that are constructed such as "images of 'Rachet women', 'baby mamas' and 'black Barbie's' [which] are ever-present in the various forms of media that flood the screens depicting Black girls and women as hyper sexual, emotionally unstable, and uneducated in comparison to the positive images of White girls and women seen in magazines, movies, and television shows".

Since most images young girls are exposed to in the present day are through media, media is where these stereotypes pervade their identity development. Being able to view media critically and understand the frameworks of their "interlocking oppressive identities" is important to Black girls in understanding the ideological roots that have socialized everyone around them.

== In media ==
In "The Oppositional Gaze: Black Female Spectator," hooks explains that Black women are not only underrepresented in film, but they are also not allowed to "look" either. Looking implores a sense of power that is removed from the Black female body, to play the role of object in direct relation to white female existence.

hooks critiques Spike Lee's She's Gotta Have It, contesting Lee's replication of mainstream patriarchal cinematic practices that represent Black women as the object of a phallocentric gaze. The replacement of white womanhood with Black womanhood led hooks to investigate Black female spectatorship.

hooks also critiques Manthia Diawara's "resisting spectatorship" as not encompassing the whole of Black female spectatorship because Black women have created alternate texts that are not solely reactions.

The oppositional gaze can be seen in cinema through primarily caucasian casting with little to no representation of the Black community. hooks' discussion and definition of oppositional gaze that allows for spectators and the audience to be aware of it on screen. Jordan Peele's film Get Out demonstrates the use of this gaze through the representation of Black females as quiet and passive, whereas the Black men are viewed for their physical characteristics. Peele explains that this film allows for the Other's (Black community) fears to be confronted "and this empowers them in the look, especially as the black protagonist triumphs in the ending showing that the Other can 'move through fear', as hooks hoped to achieve."

=== Olympia's maid ===
The surrounding controversy of Édouard Manet's Olympia (1863) highlights the confrontational gaze as defiant and critical within the context of its time. However, there is a second gaze within this painting that is "cooperating with the West's construction of not-white women as not-to-be-seen". Olympia, pegged as a prostitute, makes direct eye contact with viewers while her 'black servant' "looms in the shadows" as background. In her essay titled, "Olympia's Maid: Reclaiming Black Female Subjectivity", Lorraine O'Grady states: "...only the white body remains as the object of a voyeuristic, fetishizing male gaze. The not-white body has been made opaque by a blank stare".

This "blank stare" through a body of alterity reiterates bell hooks' definition of the oppositional gaze. The deliberate characterization of the 'black servant' is ideologically rooted in the constructs of Black female identity as Mammy, Jezebel, and Sapphire. As O'Grady declares, "Forget euphemisms. Forget 'tonal contrast'. We know what she is meant for: she is Jezebel and Mammy, prostitute and female eunuch, the two-in-one". Olympia's maid serves not only as the maid but as the opposing body of difference to whiteness; both visually and sexually. Within Freudian theory, people of color are "symbolically and even theoretically excluded from sexual difference".

Olympia, although defiant as gazing prostitute, remains as a unitary sign of the female body in the West: "It has an obverse and a reverse." As hooks says, "[this] image functions solely to reaffirm and reinscribe patriarchy". These comparative power relations conjure up opposing forces that transfer agency from one side to the "other". Michel Foucault insists that there is the possibility of resistance to domination and therefore an oppositional gaze exists.
