= Agimat =

"Amulet" in Filipino

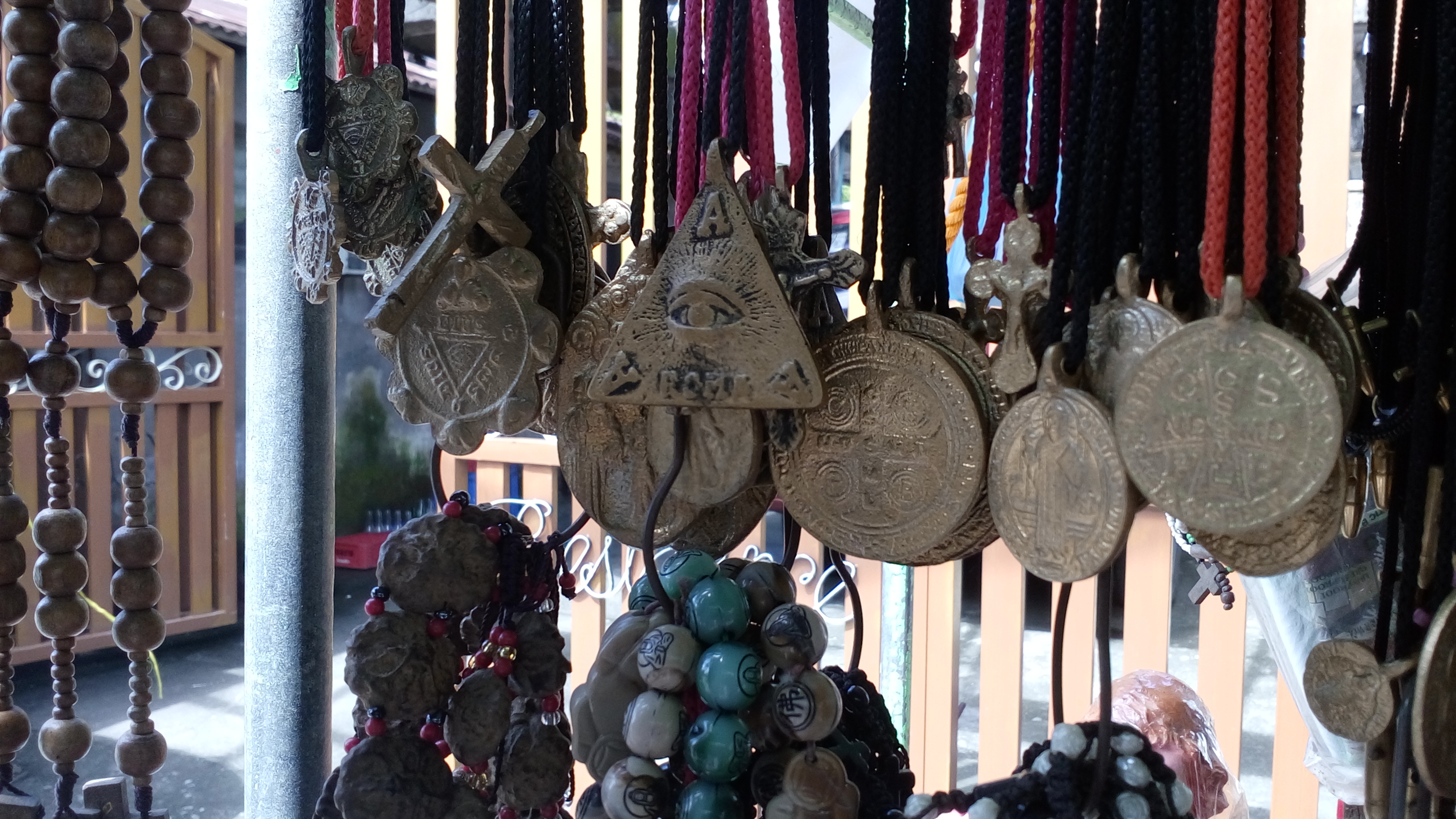
A variety of agimat of indigenous / polytheistic designs.

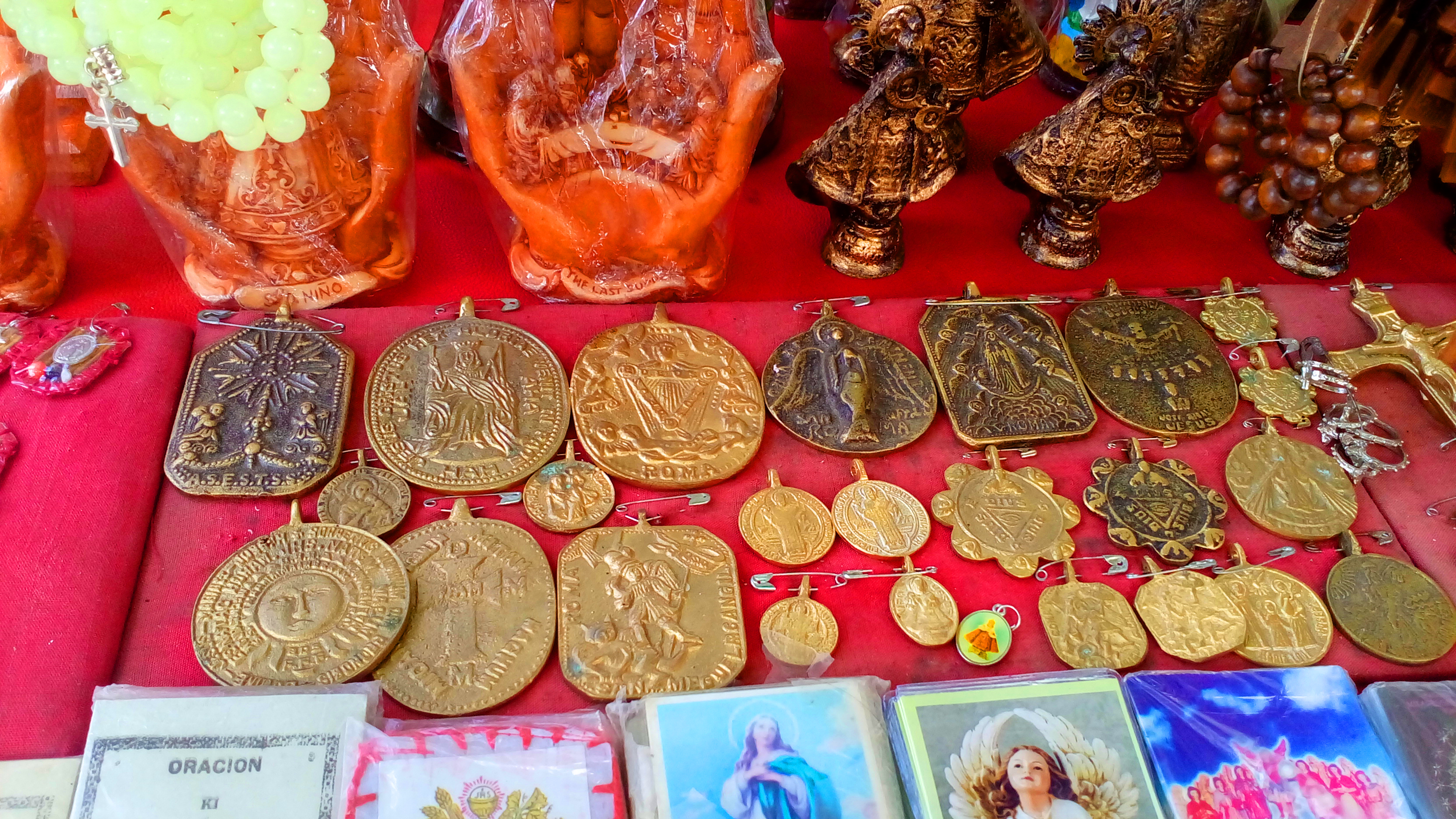
Other types of agimat combined with folk Catholicism.

Agimat, also known as anting or folklorized as anting-anting, is a Filipino word for "amulet" or "charm". Anting-anting is also a Filipino system of magic and sorcery with special use of the above-mentioned talismans, amulets, and charms. Other general terms for agimat include virtud (Virtue) and galing (Prowess).

The practice is part of a wider Southeast Asian tradition of tribal jewelry, as gantung ("hanging") in Indonesian/Malay and anting-anting ("ear hanging—ornament") in Javanese, originating in the polytheistic mythology that such supernatural ornaments were worn by the gods in their ear hook or earlobes, where it is allegedly most potent.

== Description ==
In the Philippine occult tradition, there is usually a corresponding agimat to deal with in a particular area in a person's life. The most frequent types of agimat is used for removing hexes and exorcism of evil spirits. An agimat, also called a gayuma, serves as a love charm which makes the owner more attractive to the opposite sex. Although typically a cross, a flat, round or triangular golden pendant accompanying a necklace or a necklace-like item, it is also depicted as an enchanted stone that came from the sky or a fulgurite "fang" left by a lightning strike (pangil ng kidlat) or even a drop of liquid from the heart of a banana tree at midnight (mutya). If the latter, it is usually ingested. An agimat is usually accompanied by a small book of magic incantations which must be read during Good Friday or a certain special date to attain the amulet's full power and benefit. An agimat could also be in the form of clothing with magic words inscribed on it, or even in the form of consumable enchanted mud (putik in Tagalog).

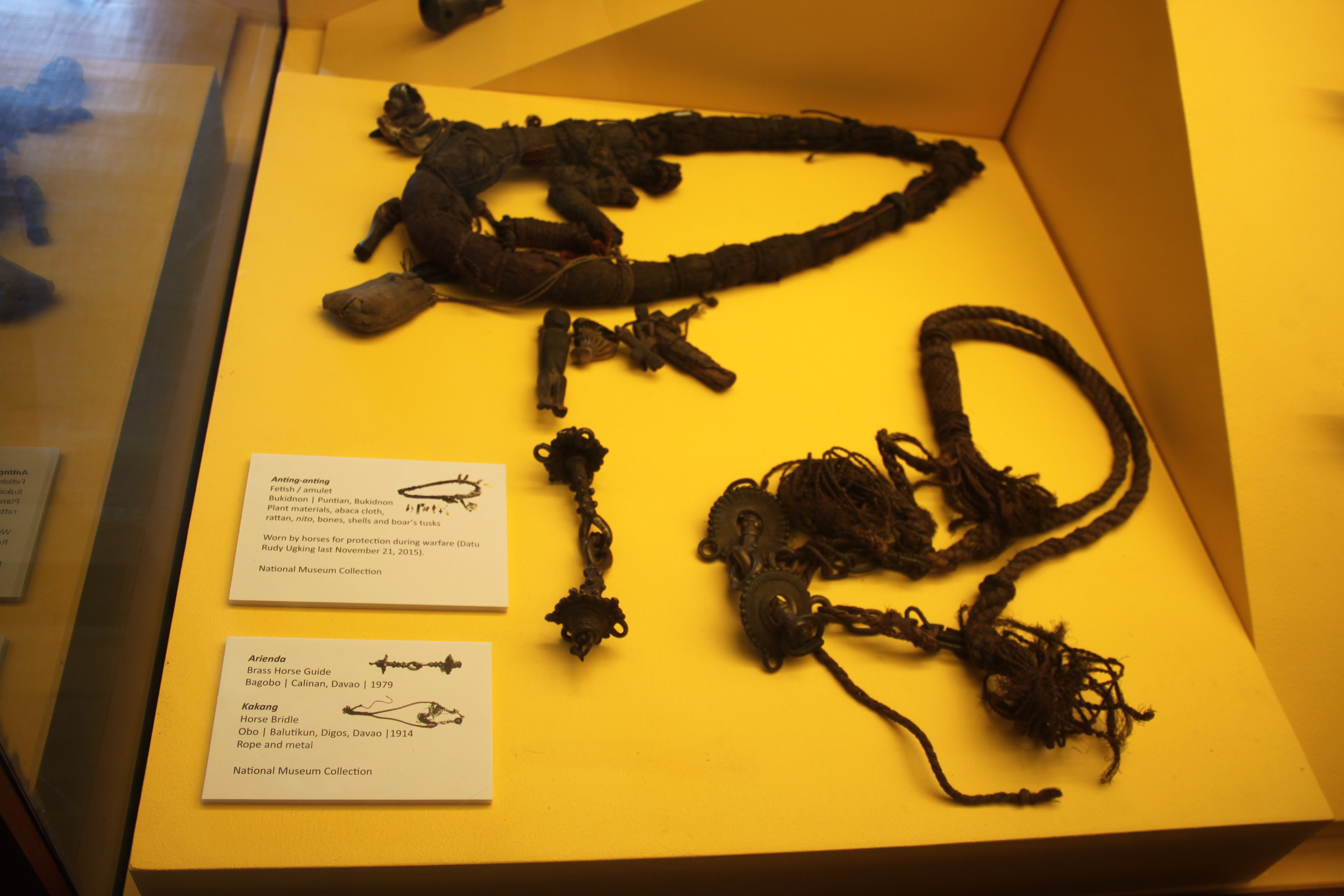
Anting-anting worn by the war horses of the Bukidnon Lumad made from shell, bone, and boar's tusks

Other methods of obtaining an agimat is by getting the liquid that is drained from an exhumed body of an unbaptized child or aborted fetus or offering food and drink to the spirits in a cemetery at midnight on Holy Wednesday or Holy Thursday. Most of the amulets bear Latin inscriptions. Like those in Quiapo district in Manila, most of the agimat merchants are near churches (such as in its courtyard or in the marketplace nearby). Filipino freedom fighters also wore anting-anting to battle against the Spaniards and the Americans. Filipino hero Macario Sakay wore a vest that has religious images and Latin phrases to protect him from bullets. Former President of the Philippines Ferdinand Marcos, claimed that he was allegedly given an anting-anting by Gregorio Aglipay that could supposedly make Marcos invisible. Marcos said that the agimat is a sliver of wood that was inserted into his back before the Bataan campaign on 1942.

Earliest reports of anting-anting are from the records of Spanish priests in the early colonial period. Pardo de Tavera defines the anting-anting as amuleto que salva la vida, da poder sobre natural ("an amulet, of super natural power, that saves lives"). With the Christianization of the Philippines, anting-anting appropriated the forms of the new religion, and incorporated as well the esoteric symbols of Freemasonry. An Islamic version of anting-anting exists in the Southern Muslim islands.

== Depictions in films ==
In Filipino films, the wearer of the agimat gains superhuman strength, invisibility, heightened senses, self-healing, and elemental powers. With it, the person can also be able to shoot or fire lightning via hands, or generate electricity throughout one's body. The person can also perform telekinesis, stop a live bullet, can have premonitions, flight, morphing abilities, camouflage abilities like a chameleon, can have extremely good luck, possess invincibility, or perform miracle curing powers. In his Filipino films, actor Ramon Revilla, Sr., as Nardong Putik has an anting-anting that renders him invulnerable.

Anting-anting are mentioned and seen several times in the 1939 film The Real Glory, where the Moro people claim they will protect them from bullets and knives.

== Subtypes ==
Agimat may be further classified into different types based on their purported sorcerous powers, they include:

- Kabal (or kunat) - agimat that supposedly make the skin invulnerable to cuts and sword slashes.
- Pamako - agimat or orasyon (magical prayer) that supposedly nail down entities to keep them from moving
- Tagabulag - agimat that supposedly turns the wearer invisible against their enemy or blind them
- Tagaliwas - agimat that can supposedly deflect bullets

== See also ==
- Bali-og
