= Laure (art model) =

19th-century French art model (fl. 1860s)

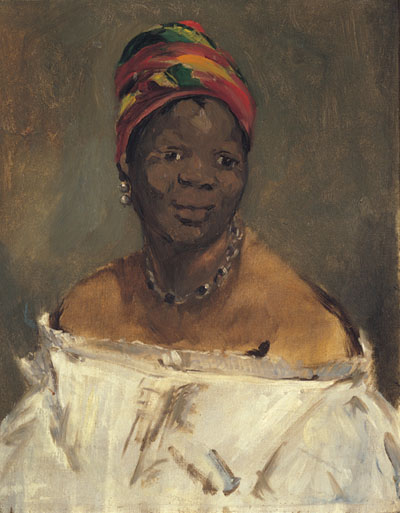
- La Négresse (1862-63) by Édouard Manet
- Born: unknown
- Occupation: Art model
- Years active: 1859–1867
- Known for: Olympia by Édouard Manet

Laure was an art model in France known for her work with artist Édouard Manet. She is best known for posing as the black maid offering the white nude figure a bouquet of flowers in Manet's 1863 painting Olympia.

== Biography ==
Little is known about Laure. She has been described as African or Caribbean and only the name "Laure" was recorded by Manet. Art historian Griselda Pollock suggested that she met the artist Édouard Manet while working as a nursemaid in the Tuileries Garden in Paris. Another theory suggests that Jeanne Duval, who was in a relationship with Manet's friend Charles Baudelaire, introduced Manet and Laure. This theory was discussed by Pollock, as well as by Manet archivist Achille Tabarant.

A notebook belonging to Manet, included in the 2019 exhibition Le Modèle noir, de Géricault à Matisse at the Musée d'Orsay in Paris, recorded her address at 11, rue de Vintimille, 3rd floor, in Paris.

Laure très belle négresse 11 rue de Vintimille 3e

— Édouard Manet, artist's notebook

Laure lived less than a 10-minute walk from Manet's apartment in a neighborhood inhabited by avant-garde artists and writers, as well as a "small but highly visible" black population. Her residence was also close to Duval, who Baudelaire wrote to at 17 rue Sauffroy.

== Studio model ==
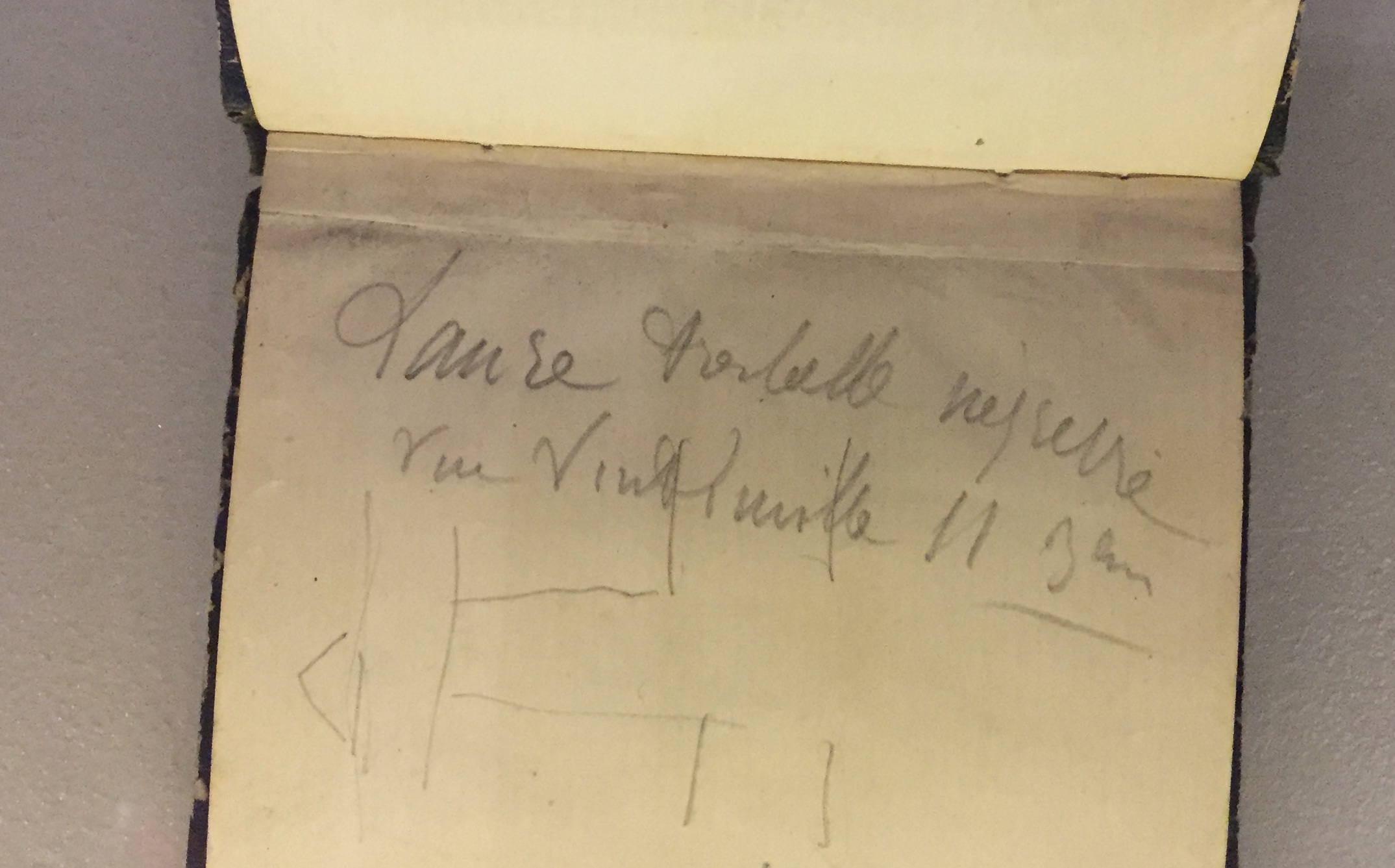
A page from Manet's notebook showing Laure's address

In addition to Manet's Olympia, Laure also appeared in Manet's painting Children in the Tuileries Garden (1861-62, Museum of Art Rhode Island School of Design, Providence, RI). In both paintings, Laure is wearing a pink dress with a high white collar and a madras headtie. It is not known whether she was painted by other artists during that period.

In 1862–63, Manet painted a portrait of Laure, La Négresse, which is also known as Portrait of Laure. This painting's subtitle is "une très belle négresse."

== Legacy ==
Laure has not been widely studied in art history. With a few exceptions, Laure is presented as "ancillary" or as a part of a larger colonial theme within the painting. Manet's depictions of Laure are referenced in other works. Artists including Frédéric Bazille, Henri Matisse, and Romare Bearden responded to or were inspired by Manet's images of Laure.

== Contemporary depictions ==
Laure is a figure portrayed by many black artists who bring her to the forefront as "a subject in her own right, deserving of subjectivity."

Renee Cox frequently references Laure in her works, combining or switching her and Olympia. Her works that reference Laure and Olympia include the 2001 Olympia's Boyz, which combines the characters, and the 2008 Missy at Home, which art historian Tracey Walters views as a reversal of the Olympia and Laure roles.

Maud Sulter has depicted Laure in many of her works, including her 1989 Phalia (Portrait of Alice Walker) and her 2002 Portrait d’une négresse (Bonny Greer) and Jeanne Duval: A Melodrama. In Jeanne Duval: A Melodrama, Sulter overlay Laure in Olympia with an 1850s Nadar photograph of an unknown black model, who Sulter suggested might be Duval.

Mickalene Thomas frequently references Laure in her work. Her 2012 series Une très belle négresse takes its name from the Portrait of Laure subtitle.

Elizabeth Colomba's 2018 painting Laure (Portrait of a Negresse) depicts Laure on her way to Manet's studio. Colomba's painting was included in the exhibition Posing Modernity: The Black Model from Manet and Matisse to Today, alongside Manet's paintings of Laure, at the Wallach Art Gallery, Columbia University. This exhibit, curated by Denise Murrell, placed Laure in the spotlight, which redefined and named black women in art.

== Gallery ==
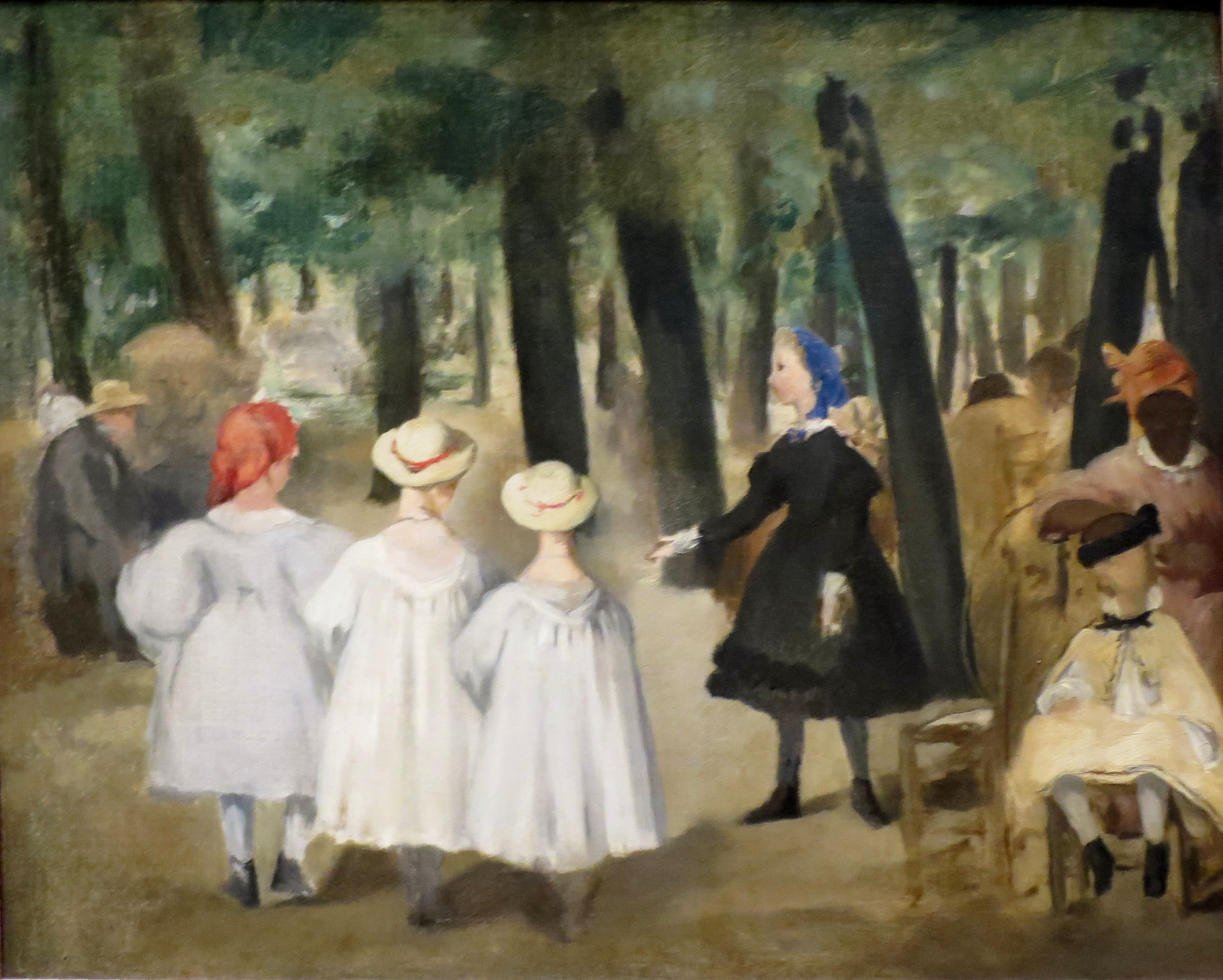
Children in the Tuileries Garden (1862) by Édouard Manet

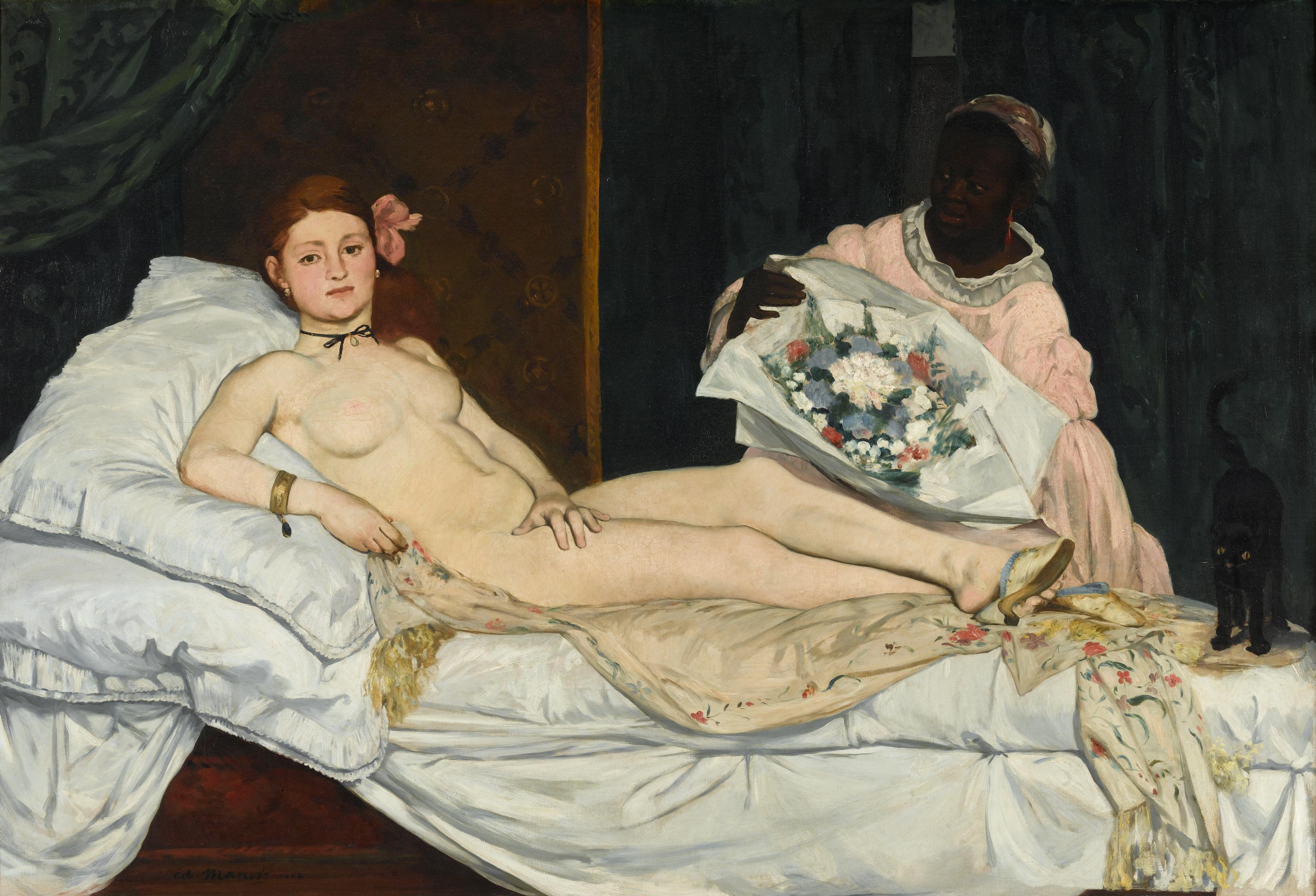
Olympia (1863) by Édouard Manet

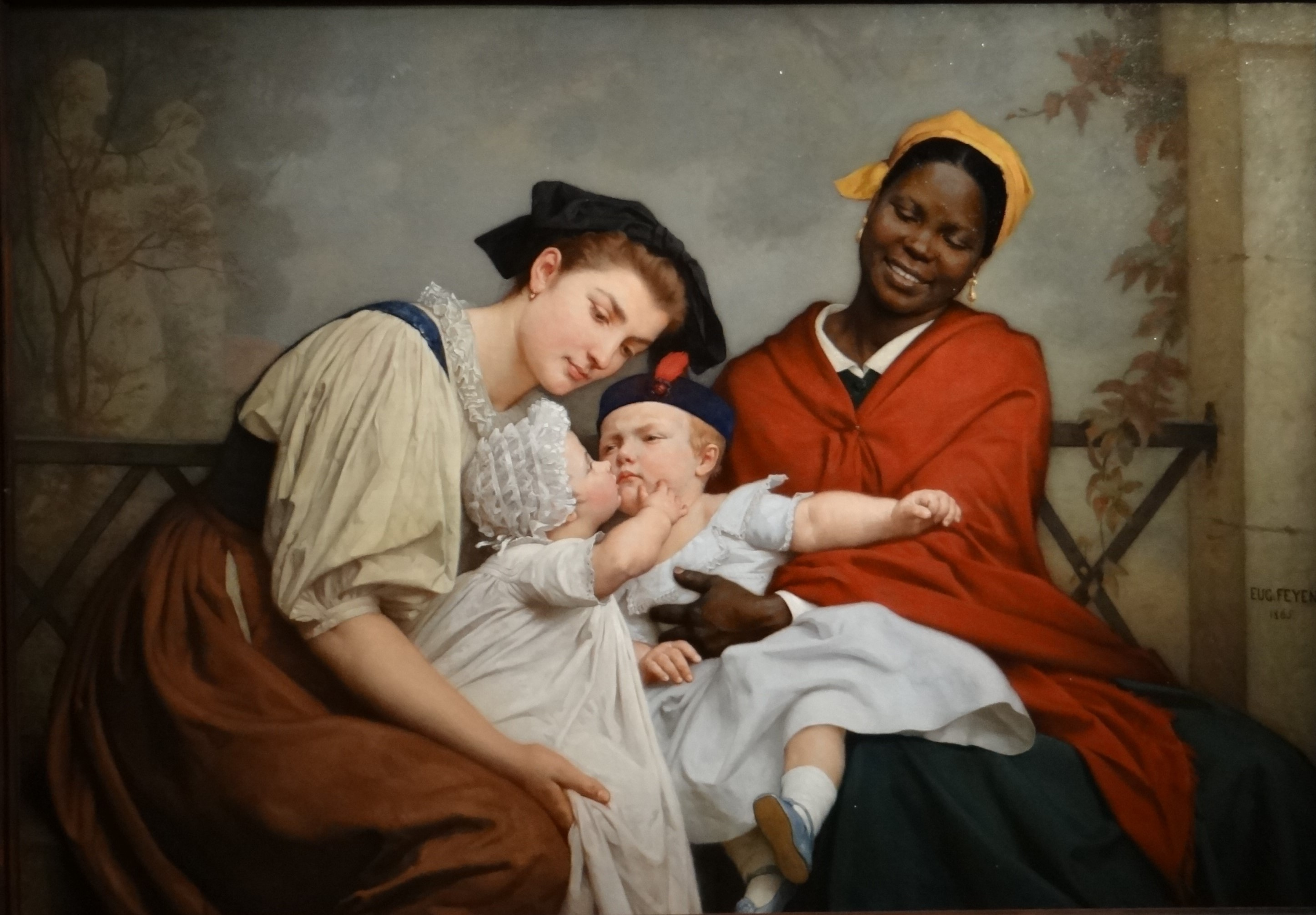
Le baiser enfantin (1865) by Jacques-Eugène Feyen

== See also ==
- Fanny Eaton
- Joseph (art model)
