= Crown Hotel (Mona Lisa Black Background) =

1982 painting by Jean-Michel Basquiat

- Artist: Jean-Michel Basquiat
- Year: 1982
- Medium: Acrylic and collage of paper on canvas mounted on a cross frame
- Movement: Neo-expressionism
- Dimensions: 124 cm × 216 cm (49 in × 85 in)
- Location: Private collection

Crown Hotel (Mona Lisa Black Background) is a 1982 painting created by American artist Jean-Michel Basquiat in 1982. The artwork cites Leonardo da Vinci's Mona Lisa and Édouard Manet's Olympia, two canonical works of western art. In June 2013, it sold for $7.4 million at Sotheby's.

== History ==
The artwork was painted in 1982, which is considered Basquiat's most valuable year. It was first shown by his art dealer, Bruno Bischofberger, a Zurich gallery-owner. It was later shown at the Mary Boone Gallery in New York in 1999, and then it was acquired by Comtesse Viviane de Witt. Comtesse Viviane de Witt is married to Jerome de Witt—a descendant of Napoleon's brother Jerome, King of Westphalia. She became one of France's first female auctioneers in 1978.

In 2013, Crown Hotel (Mona Lisa Black Background) sold for $7.4 million at Sotheby's sale of Contemporary Art in Paris and set a record price in France for a Basquiat artwork. Sotheby's said: "It is a powerful yet coherent work of tremendous depth and complexity—the most important Basquiat ever to appear at auction in France." In 2017, that record was surpassed by Jim Crow (1986), which sold for $17.7 million at Christie's in Paris.

== Analysis ==
Author Jana Evans Braziel describes Crown Hotel (Mona Lisa Black Background) as "a cacophonic visual screen onto which he casts his (and American culture's) anxieties about art, race, class, and commoditization." Basquiat studied the anatomical drawings of Leonardo da Vinci, who was his favorite artist. He references Leonardo's Mona Lisa in the painting with captions like "MONA LISA – SEVENTEEN PERCENT MONA LISA FOR FOOLS."

Basquiat contrasts a black background with a centered frontal figure of a nude white woman surrounded by colorful texts and cartoon heads. The female figure may be a nod to Édouard Manet's Olympia. To the left of the figure, Basquiat directly references Manet's Olympia, a reoccurring subject tackled by Basquiat in his works during that period such as Three quarters of Olympia minus the Servant (1982) and Untitled (Detail of Maid from Olympia) (1982). Author Leonard Emmerling noted that "if a black woman is a rarity in European painting, it is all the more indicative of an underlying racism when one does appear, as Manet's work, merely as the servant of a naked, white-skinned beauty."

Above the oval-framed word "OLYMPIA" is a golden crown. The three-pointed crown was Basquiat's signature artistic motif. Although the crown is a sign of royalty and honor, written below is the commodity value: "SIX AMERICAN DOLLARS." Given the title of the painting, Crown Hotel, "the price may be a nightly rate...Is this a hotel or gallery? Are the severed cartoon heads those of dealers? Or pimps?"

== Exhibitions ==
The painting has been exhibited at the following art institutions:

- Jean-Michel Basquiat at Galerie Bruno Bischofberger in Zurich, September 11–October 9, 1982.
- Jean-Michel Basquiat at FAE Musée d'Art Contemporain in Pully/Lausanne, July 10–November 7, 1993.

== See also ==
- List of paintings by Jean-Michel Basquiat
