= Elizabeth Colomba =

French painter of Martinique heritage

- Born: Èpinay-sur-Seine, France
- Education: École des Beaux-Arts
- Known for: Historical paintings and portraits of black subjects
- Notable work: Laure (Portrait of a Negresse) (2018)
- Website: elizabeth-colomba.com

Elizabeth Colomba (born 1976) is a French painter of Martinique heritage known for her paintings of black people in historic settings. Her work has been shown at the Gracie Mansion, the Wallach Art Gallery at Columbia University, the Museum of Contemporary African Diasporan Arts, the Musée d'Orsay, Los Angeles County Museum of Art, and the Metropolitan Museum of Art.

== Early life ==
Colomba was born in Épinay-sur-Seine, where her parents had immigrated to from Martinique. As a child, she told her mother she wanted to become a painter after learning about Picasso. She began painting early, making watercolors as a child to decorate her parents' Caribbean restaurant. As a teenager, she read The Image of the Black in Western Art by John and Dominique de Menil, which inspired her to paint a portrait of her great-grandmother in the style of Whistler’s Mother. She continued to study the paintings of Louvre, especially the Dutch masters, and attended the École des Beaux-Arts. In 1998, she moved to Los Angeles and worked in storyboarding and illustration for the film industry.

== Career ==
Colomba started spending time in New York in 2007 to further her painting career, and moved to the city permanently in 2011. She met artist Deborah Willis in 2010 after Willis saw one of her paintings at the Museum of Contemporary African Diasporan Arts, and Willis helped her enter the New York art world. Her work focuses on black figures from history, especially black women. Her subjects have included Biddy Mason, Laure, Chevalier de Saint-Georges, and Harriet P. Jacobs.

In 2016, she had a solo exhibition of works at the Long Gallery in Harlem, which The New Yorker described as "opulent portraits of black women [that] redress the erasures of women of color in nineteenth-century art history."

In March 2022, her first solo museum show opened at Princeton University. Her solo show "Mythologies," which included oil paintings, works on paper, and her short film Cendrillon, opened at the Portland Museum of Art in 2023.

=== Notable paintings ===
- Armelle (1997), depicting Colomba's cousin contemplating the painting Under the Palm Tree by Winslow Homer, collection of the Metropolitan Museum of New York;
- Biddy Mason (2006)
- Chevalier de St Georges (2010)
- Haven (2015), depicting a black couple in Weeksville, was featured in a 2019 show at the Gracie Mansion organized by Chirlane McCray
- Laure (Portrait of a Negresse) (2018), which is a reinterpretation of a painting by Edouard Manet
- Minerva Portrait of Minerva commissioned by the Park Avenue Armory in New York. This is the first work by a Black artist in the Armory
- Riding Places (2021) was included in the exhibition Taking Space: Contemporary Women Artists and the Politics of Scale at the Pennsylvania Academy of the Fine Arts

=== Other artworks ===
- In 2018, the Metropolitan Opera's streaming series premiered Colomba's short film Cendrillon, starring Grace Bol.
- Colomba illustrated the 2021 graphic novel Queenie, the Godmother of Harlem, about Stéphanie St. Clair
- 157 Years of Juneteenth, a watercolor for a New Yorker cover celebrating Juneteenth
