= Olympia (Manet) =

1863 painting by Édouard Manet

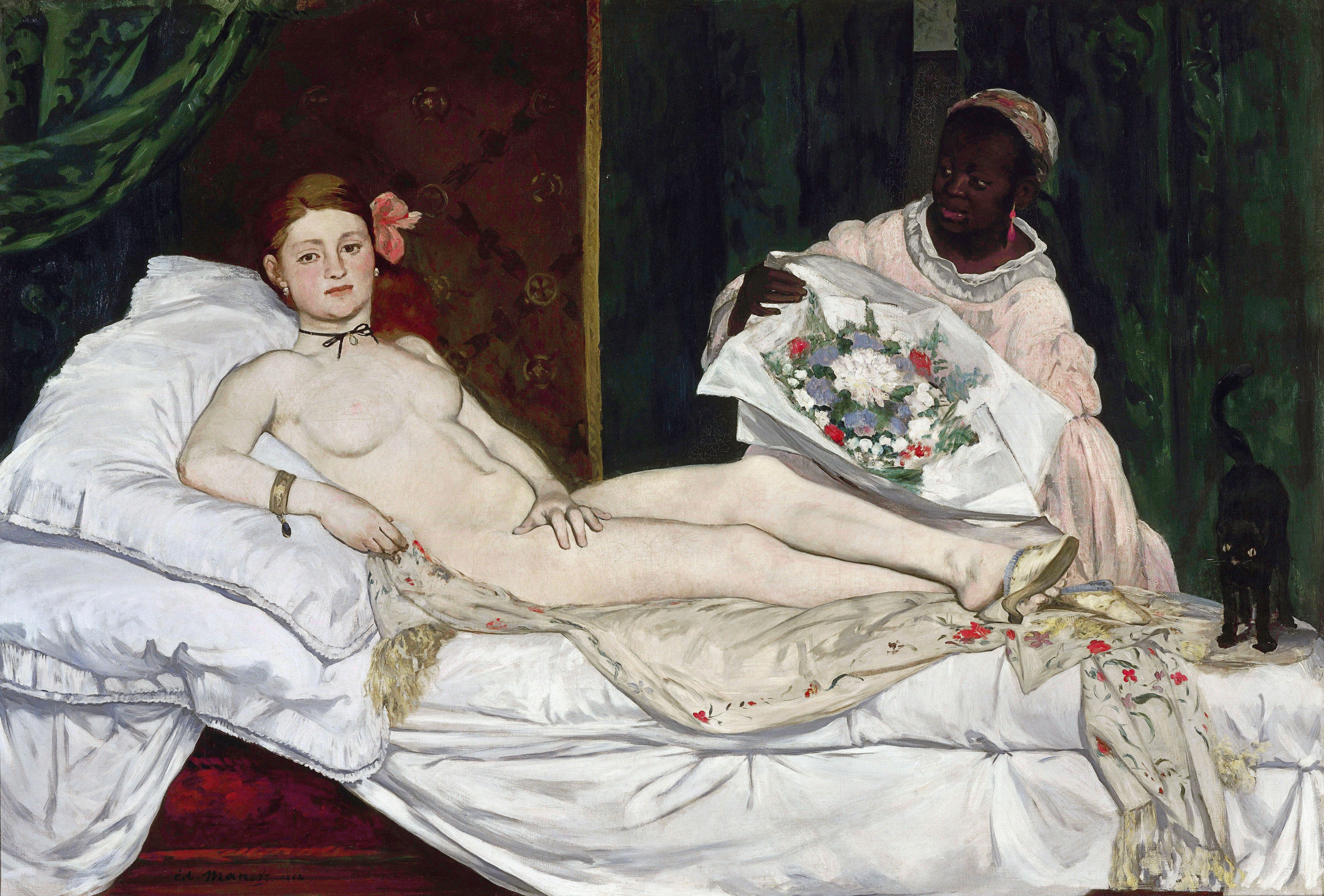
- Artist: Édouard Manet
- Year: 1863–1865
- Medium: Oil on canvas
- Dimensions: 130.5 cm × 190 cm (51.4 in × 74.8 in)
- Location: Musée d'Orsay, Paris

Olympia is an 1863 oil painting by Édouard Manet, depicting a nude white woman ("Olympia") lying on a bed being attended to by a black maid. The French government acquired the painting in 1890 after a public subscription organized by Claude Monet. The painting is now in the Musée d'Orsay, Paris.

The figure of Olympia was modeled by 19 year-old Victorine Meurent, and that of her servant by Laure. Olympia's confrontational gaze caused shock and controversy when the painting was first exhibited at the 1865 Paris Salon, especially because a number of details in the picture identified her as a prostitute.

The title of the painting is generally attributed to Manet's close friend Zacharie Astruc, an art critic and artist, since an excerpt from one of Astruc's poems was included in the catalogue entry along with Olympia when it was first exhibited in 1865.

== Content ==
Contemporary audiences were shocked by Olympia's confrontational gaze, combined with details identifying her as a demi-mondaine, or courtesan. These include the fact that the name "Olympia" was associated with prostitutes in 1860s Paris.

The orchid flower in her hair, her bracelet, pearl earrings, the oriental shawl on which she lies, and the upright black cat are symbols of wealth and sensuality. The black ribbon choker around her neck, in contrast with her pale skin and cast-off slipper, emphasizes the voluptuous atmosphere.

The painting takes inspiration from Titian's Venus of Urbino (c. 1534). Whereas the left hand of Titian's Venus is curled and appears to entice, Olympia's left hand appears to block, which has been interpreted as symbolic of her role as a prostitute, granting access to her body in return for payment. Manet replaced the little dog (symbol of fidelity) in Titian's painting with a black cat, a creature associated with nocturnal promiscuity. The aroused posture of the cat was provocative; in French, chatte (cat) is slang for female genitalia. In the background of Titian's painting is a myrtle bush, a symbol of marriage and fidelity, planted in a sturdy pot. In a reversal of this symbolism, Olympia is presented by her servant with cut flowers wrapped in flimsy paper – something destined to fade quickly and be discarded. Olympia disdainfully ignores the flowers, which have been interpreted as a gift from one of her clients. Some have suggested that she could be looking in the direction of the door as her client barges in unannounced.

The painting deviates from the academic canon in its style, characterized by broad, quick brushstrokes, studio lighting that eliminates mid-tones, large color surfaces, and shallow depth. Unlike the smooth idealized nude of Alexandre Cabanel's La naissance de Vénus, also painted in 1863, Olympia is portrayed as a real woman whose nakedness is emphasized by the harsh lighting. That she displays no embarrassment at her nudity – and is depicted matter-of-factly as a contemporary Parisian woman rather than a character from history or mythology – offended and shocked viewers. The canvas is 130.5 × 190 cm (51.4 × 74.8 inches), a large size that was conventionally associated with edifying depictions of episodes from history or mythology, not tawdry scenes of prostitution. Finally, Olympia is fairly thin by the artistic standards of the time. Charles Baudelaire thought thinness was more indecent than fatness.

The model for Olympia, Victorine Meurent, started modeling when she was sixteen years old and later became an accomplished painter in her own right. Her paintings were exhibited in the Paris Salon in 1876, 1879, 1885, and 1904.

== Critical reaction ==
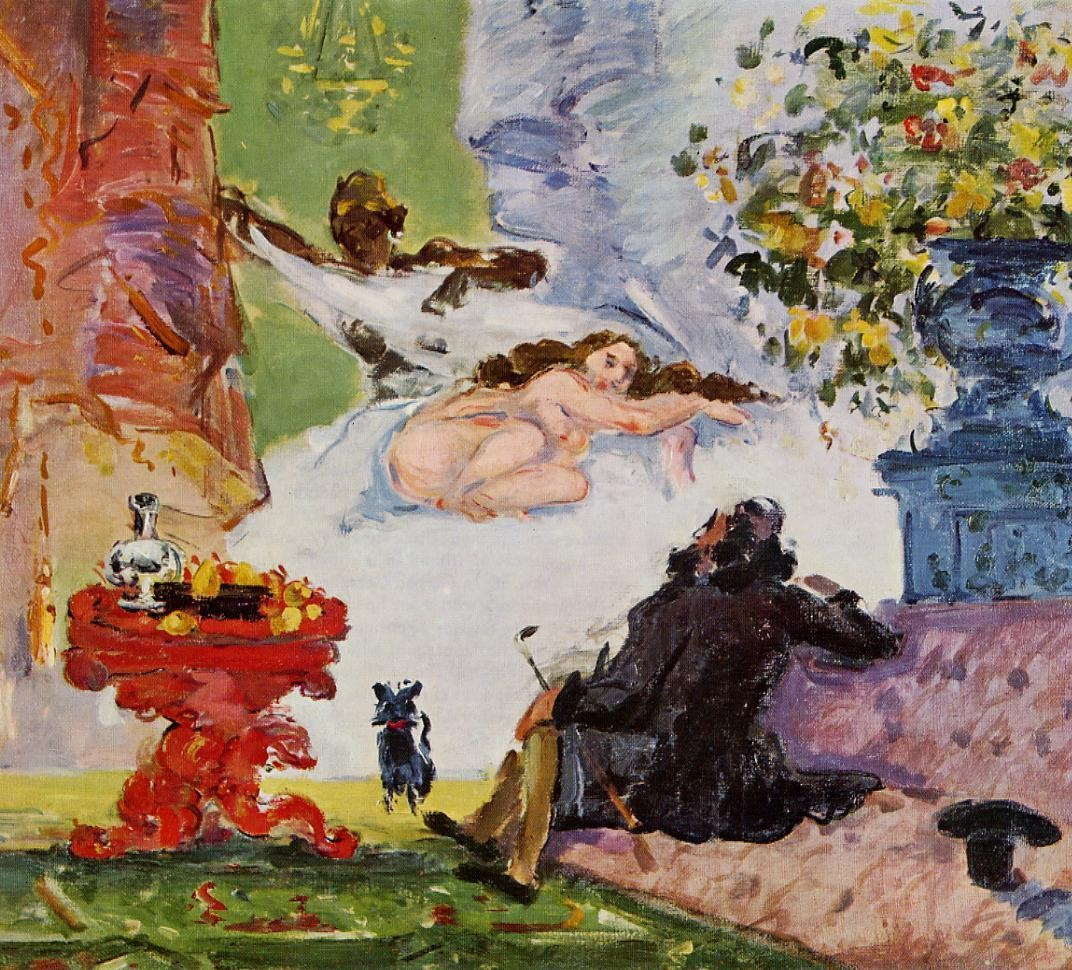
Paul Cézanne, A Modern Olympia (c. 1873/74)

Though Manet's The Luncheon on the Grass (Le déjeuner sur l'herbe) had sparked controversy in 1863, his Olympia stirred an even bigger uproar when it was first exhibited at the 1865 Paris Salon. Conservatives condemned the work as "immoral" and "vulgar". Journalist Antonin Proust later recalled, "If the canvas of the Olympia was not destroyed, it is only because of the precautions that were taken by the administration." The critics and the public condemned the work alike. Even Émile Zola was reduced to disingenuously commenting on the work's formal qualities rather than acknowledging the subject matter: "You wanted a nude, and you chose Olympia, the first that came along". He paid tribute to Manet's honesty, however: "When our artists give us Venuses, they correct nature, they lie. Édouard Manet asked himself why lie, why not tell the truth; he introduced us to Olympia, this fille of our time, whom you meet on the sidewalks."

=== Olympia's maid ===
Although originally overlooked, the figure of the maid in the painting, modelled by a woman named Laure, has become a topic of discussion among contemporary scholars. As T. J. Clark recounts of a friend's disbelief in the revised 1990 version of The Painting of Modern Life: "For God's sake! You've written about the white woman on the bed for fifty pages and more, and hardly mentioned the black woman alongside her!" Olympia was created 15 years after slavery had been abolished in France and its empire, but negative stereotypes of black people persisted among some elements of French society. In some cases, the white prostitute in the painting was described using racially charged language. According to Marie Lathers, "references to Blackness thus invaded the image of white Olympia, turning her into the caricatural and grotesque animal that Black people are frequently made to represent in the nineteenth century."

Many critics have applauded Manet in his use of white and black in the painting, an alternative to the tradition of chiaroscuro. Charles Bernheimer has responded,

The black maid is not ... simply a darkly colored counterpart to Olympia's whiteness, but rather an emblem of the dark, threatening, anomalous sexuality lurking just under Olympia's hand. At least, this is the fantasy Manet's servant figure may well have aroused in the male spectator of 1865.

According to Timothy Paul, some black feminists, including Lorraine O'Grady, have argued that it is not for artistic convention that Manet included Laure but to create an ideological binary between black and white, good and bad, clean and dirty and as such "inevitably reformulates the Cartesian perspectival logic that allows whiteness to function as the only subject of consideration". When paired with a lighter skin tone, the black female model stands in as signifier to all of the racial stereotypes of the West.

==== Confrontational gaze and oppositional gaze ====
In Lorraine O'Grady's essay "Olympia's Maid: Reclaiming Black Female Subjectivity", she asserts, "Olympia's maid, like all other 'peripheral Negroes'", is a robot conveniently made to disappear into the background drapery. While the confrontational gaze of Olympia is often referenced as the pinnacle of defiance toward patriarchy, the oppositional gaze of Olympia's maid is ignored; she is part of the background with little to no attention given to the critical role of her presence.

O'Grady points out that we know she represents 'Jezebel and Mammy' "and best of all, she is not a real person", rather she is object to the objectified and excluded from sexual difference according to Freudian theory. While Olympia looks directly at the viewer, her maid, too, is looking back. In her essay "Mammy, Jezebel, Sapphire and Their Homegirls: Developing an Oppositional Gaze toward the Images of Black Women", Catherine West concludes that by claiming an oppositional gaze we can identify, criticize, resist and transform these and other oppressive images of black women.

=== Events ===
==== Purchase for France ====
After being alerted by John Singer Sargent in 1888 that Manet's widow, Suzanne was apparently in financial difficulties and that she intended to sell the painting, possibly to an unknown American, Claude Monet became determined to acquire his friend's painting for France. He then launched a yearlong campaign to raise the 20,000 francs that was being asked for Olympia. The asking price was relatively low compared to prices paid by other artists. Around the same time, paintings by Jean-François Millet were sold for 750,000 francs and by Ernest Meissonier for 850,000 francs. Georges de Bellio best summed up the objectives of the campaign: "It (the subscription) will have the triple merit of being a just tribute to the memory of this poor dear Manet, of coming to the aid of his widow in a discreet way and finally of preserving for France a truly valuable work."

Antonin Proust, both a childhood friend of Manet and a former arts minister was in favour of Manet's entry into the Louvre, but felt that this should be done through paintings other than Olympia. A misunderstanding in the press over the donation led to Proust challenging Monet to a duel. Monet's "seconds", Théodore Duret and Gustave Geffroy, were able to soothe Proust who after a subsequent friendly meeting with Monet agreed to use his influence to convince the government to accept the painting.

By mid-October 15,000 francs had been raised, but it seemed that the Louvre was not ready to accept the donation. A temporary solution seemed to be to first have the painting enter the Musée du Luxembourg instead. At the same time, Suzanne Manet made it known through the pages of the Le Figaro newspaper that she had no need of financial help. By November Monet had raised 18,559 francs.

Among the nearly 100 people from a wide spectrum who donated money were, Monet 1,000 francs, Edgar Degas 100, Paul Durand-Ruel 200, Gustave Geffroy 50, Philippe Burty 25, Joris-Karl Huysmans 25, Stéphane Mallarmé 25, Octave Mirbeau 300, Georges Petit 200, Camille Pissarro 50, Antonin Proust 500, Auguste Rodin 25 with arts patron Winnaretta Singer giving the largest at 2,000 Francs. Other included Siegfried Bing, Giovanni Boldini, Jules Chéret, Emmanuel Chabrier, Gustave Caillebotte, Carolus-Duran, Henri Fantin-Latour, Henri Gervex, Alexandre Millerand, Étienne Moreau-Nélaton, Pierre Puvis de Chavannes, Théodule Ribot, Pierre-Auguste Renoir, Félicien Rops and John Singer Sargent. Émile Zola was one of the few that refused.

On 7 February 1890, Monet met with the Minister of Public Instruction and Fine Arts and gave him a letter formalizing the donation of the work to the Louvre, with the list of subscribers, on the condition that the painting be exhibited either at the Louvre or in the Luxembourg. The decision fell to Gustave Larroumet, then director of Fine Arts. He replied that the work could be admitted to Luxembourg but without assurance of exhibition. This response did not satisfy Monet, who was supported by his deputy Camille Pelletan. Finally, the Louvre reluctantly gave an assurance that the painting would be exhibited. In March 1890, Olympia was purchased from Suzanne Manet for 19,415 francs and entered the Luxembourg shortly after.

==== Display ====
By order of prime minister Georges Clemenceau, Olympia finally took its place in the Louvre in 1907. In 1947 it was transferred to its extension, the Jeu de Paume, where it remained until in 1986 it was assigned to the Musée d'Orsay.

The painting has left Paris only three times. In 2013, for its 150th birthday, Olympia went to Venice and was displayed next to Titian's Venus of Urbino, which had been one of Manet's inspirations for Olympia. In 2016, the painting was displayed in Moscow and St. Petersburg as part of a Franco-Russian diplomacy effort. From September 2023 to January 2024, the painting was included in the exhibition "Manet/Degas" at the Metropolitan Museum of Art in New York.

In January 2016, a Luxembourg performance artist, Deborah De Robertis, lay on the floor in front of the painting nude and mimicked the pose of the subject. She was arrested for indecent exposure.

== Precedents ==
In part, the painting was inspired by Titian's Venus of Urbino (c. 1534), which in turn derives from Giorgione's Sleeping Venus (c. 1510). Titian's has two fully clothed women, presumably servants, in the background. Léonce Bénédite was the first art historian to explicitly acknowledge the similarity to the Venus of Urbino in 1897. There is also some similarity to Francisco Goya's La maja desnuda (c. 1800).

There were also pictorial precedents for a nude white female, often pictured with a black female servant, such as Léon Benouville's Esther with Odalisque (1844), Ingres' Odalisque with a Slave (1842), and Charles Jalabert's Odalisque (1842). Comparison is also made to Ingres' Grande Odalisque (1814). Manet did not depict a goddess or an odalisque but a high-class prostitute (in this case waiting for a client); it has been argued that some critics assumed Titian did the same.

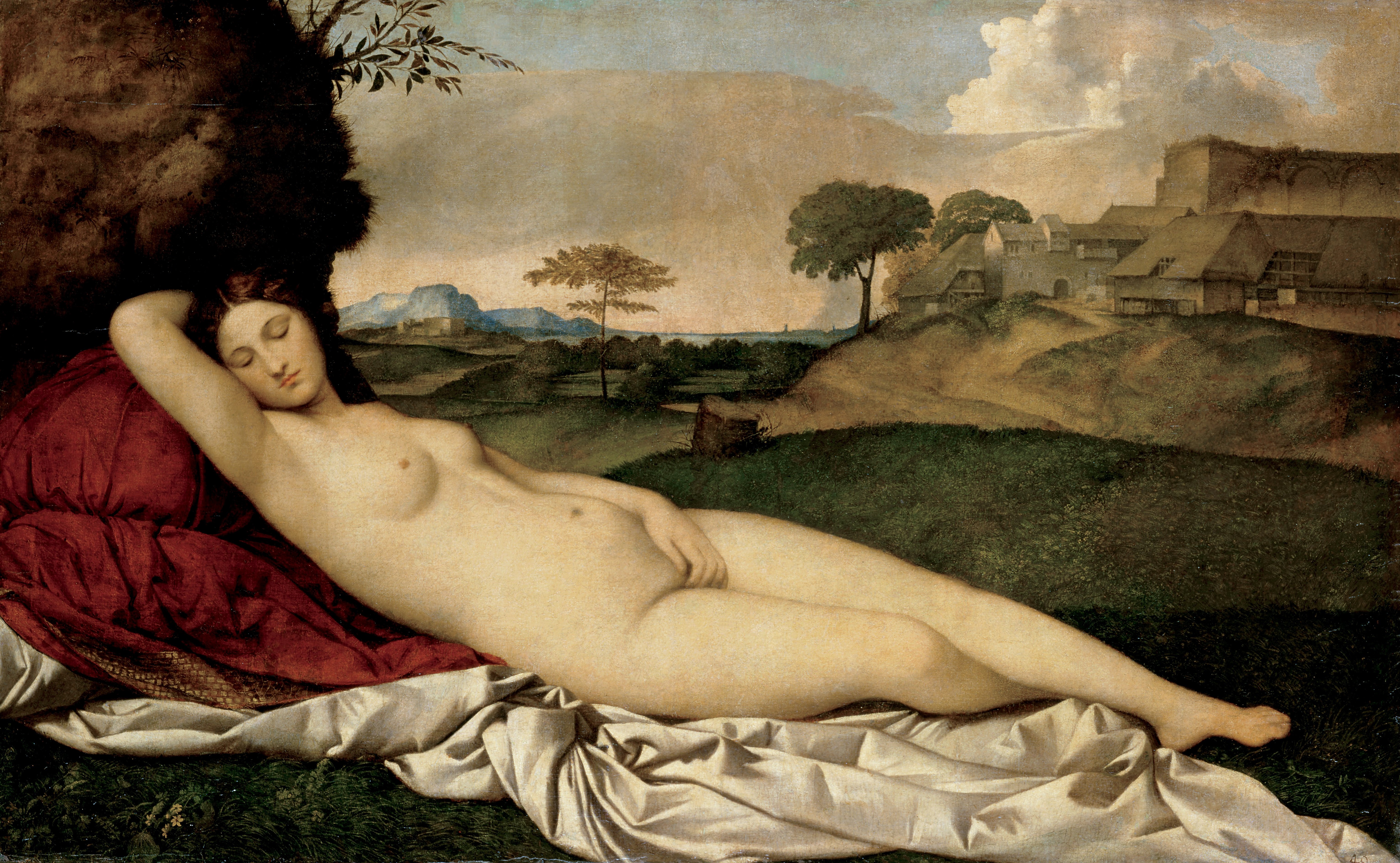
Giorgione, Sleeping Venus (c. 1510), also known as the Dresden Venus

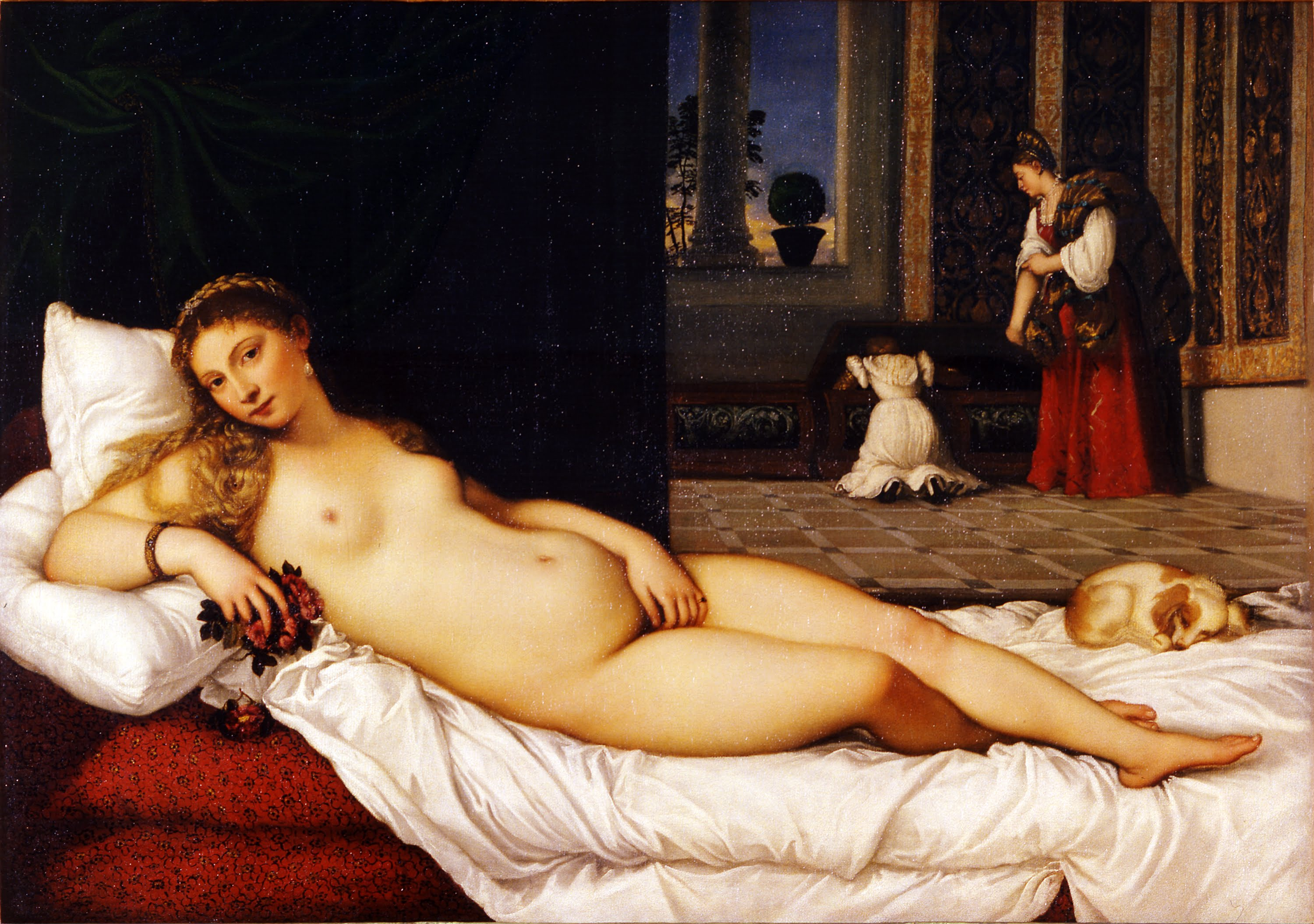
Titian, Venus of Urbino (1538)

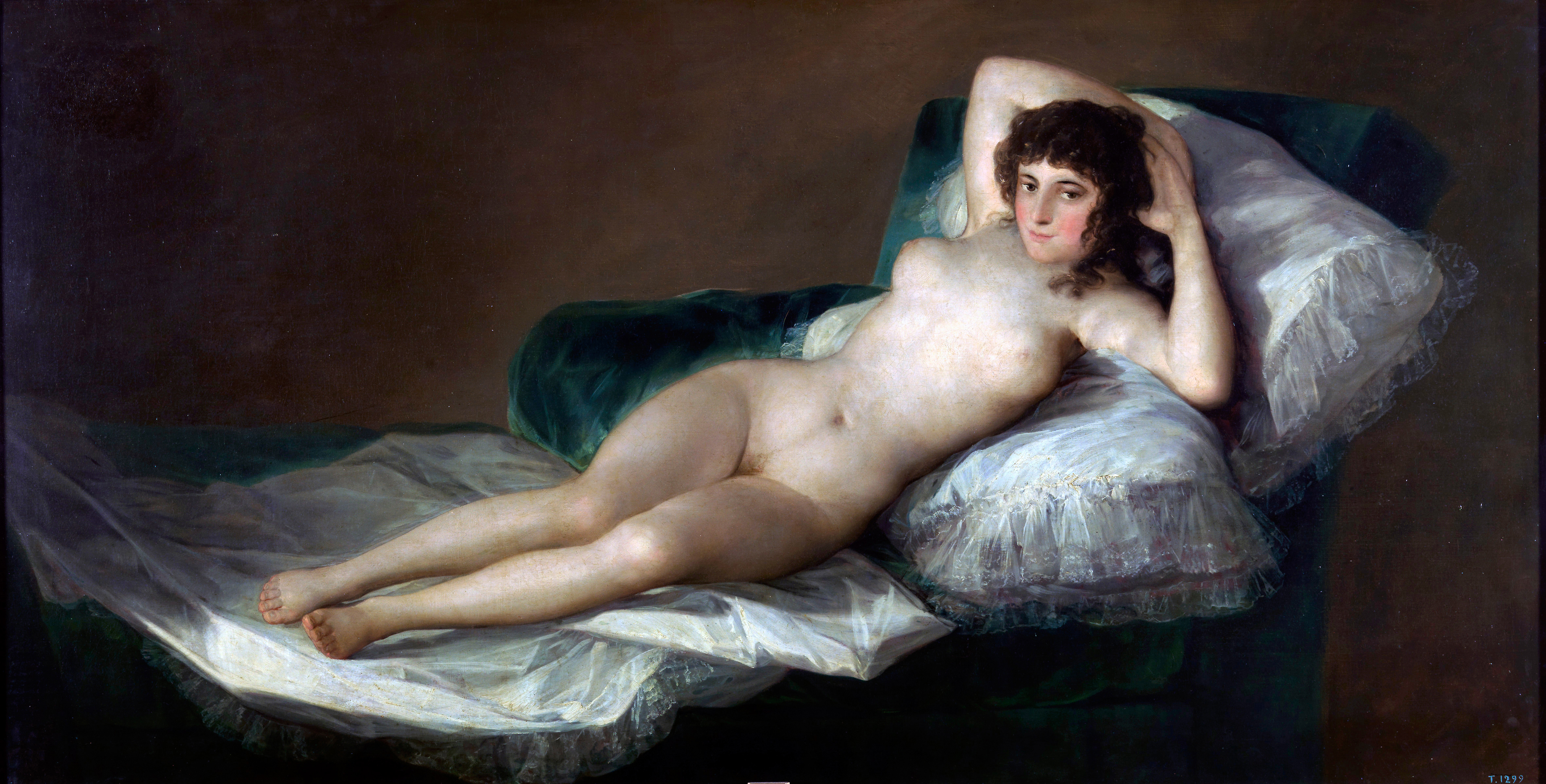
Francisco de Goya, La maja desnuda (circa 1797–1800), known in English as The Naked (or Nude) Maja

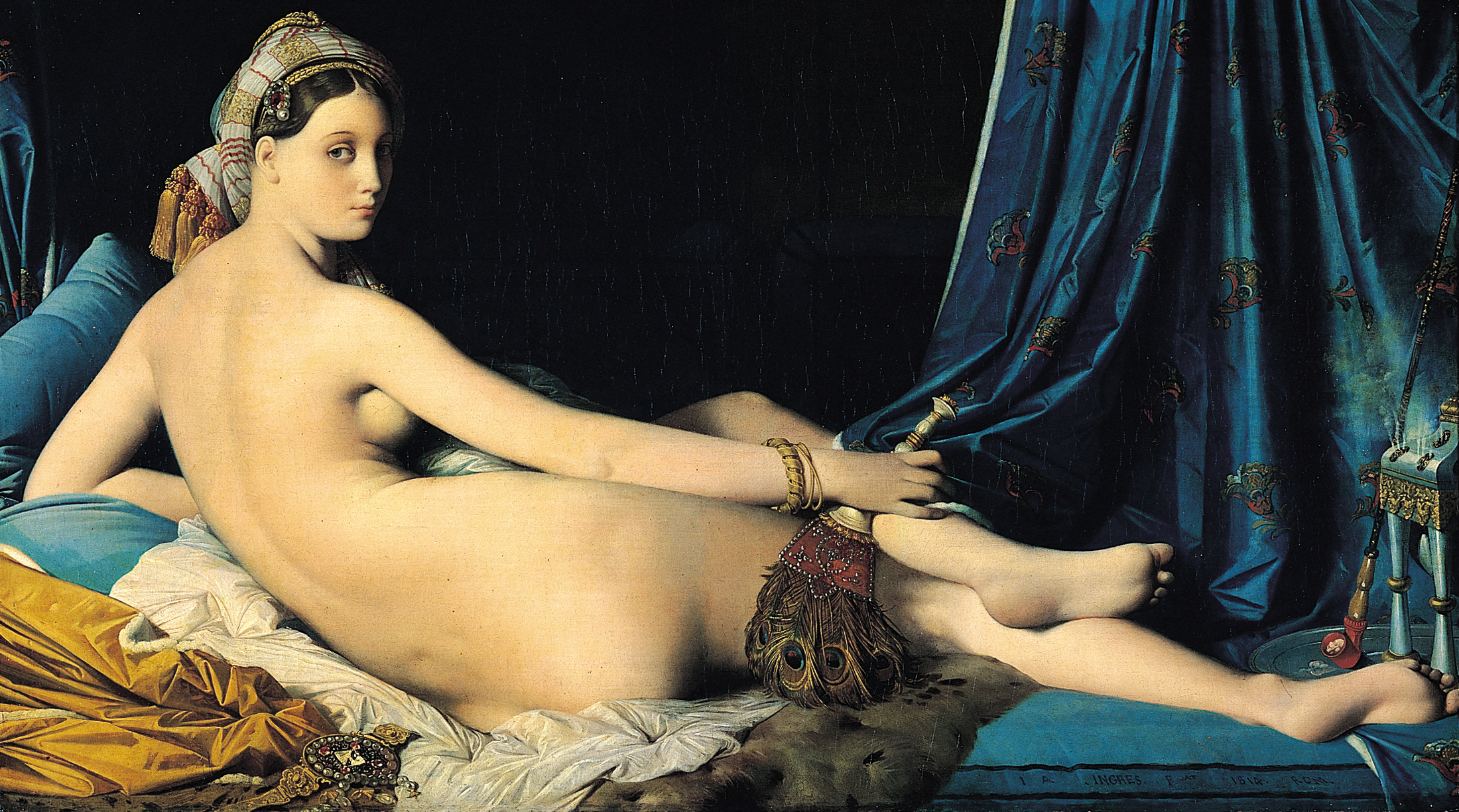
Jean Auguste Dominique Ingres, Grande Odalisque, (1814)

== Homages ==
- A Modern Olympia, Paul Cézanne, c. 1873/74.
- Olympia, René Magritte, 1948
- Three Quarters of Olympia Minus the Servant, Jean-Michel Basquiat, 1982.
- Untitled (Detail of Maid from Olympia), Jean-Michel Basquiat, 1982.
- Crown Hotel (Mona Lisa Black Background), Jean-Michel Basquiat, 1982.
- Portrait (Futago), Yasumasa Morimura, 1988.
- Odalisque I. Looking at Manet. Olympia and A Family, Louis le Brocquy, 2005.
- "Somms Recreating Old Masters: Series 1", Mark Shipway, c. 2015.

== Braun-Vega's appropriations ==
Olympia is used as a subject for recurrent appropriations in the paintings of the Peruvian artist Herman Braun-Vega. He reinterpreted it for the first time in 1982 to create a portrait of a couple of friends in a humorous staging. The painting titled Robert and Odile Zantain (The Lesson...) shows Olympia in a hospital bed, her abdomen marked by a recent scar. Mrs. Zantain, dressed in her surgeon's attire, poses as Dr. Tulp in The Anatomy Lesson, while her husband assumes the role of another character in Rembrandt's painting. Thus, from 1982 to 2001, Olympia found herself in unexpected situations: in the middle of town in front of a newsstand, in a Peruvian market among fruit stalls, under the gaze of curious teenagers, in the tropics, by the sea, wearing a turban in the Parc de Sceaux, or in the company of Ingres' bather and Les Demoiselles d'Avignon in the drawing A New Turkish Bath.

== See also ==
- List of paintings by Édouard Manet
- 100 Great Paintings, 1980 BBC series
- 1863 in art

== References and sources ==
=== Sources ===
- King, Ross (2006). The Judgment of Paris: The Revolutionary Decade that Gave the World Impressionism. New York: Waller & Company, pp. 105–108. ISBN 0-8027-1466-8.
- Lipton, Eunice (1999). Alias Olympia: A Woman's Search for Manet's Notorious Model & Her Own Desire. Ithaca: Cornell University Press. ISBN 0-8014-8609-2
- Main, V. R. (2008). A Woman with No Clothes On: A Novel. London: Delancey Press. ISBN 978-0-9539119-7-4.
- Wildenstein, Daniel (1996). Monet ou le Triomphe de l'Impressionnisme (in French). Cologne: Taschen. ISBN 978-3-8365-2322-6.
- Wullschläger, Jackie (2023). Monet: The Restless Vision (Hardcover). London: Allen Lane. ISBN 978-0-241-18830-9.

=== Further reading ===
- Hamilton, George Heard (1954). Manet and His Critics. New Haven, Connecticut: Yale University Press, pp. 65–80.
- Murrell, Denise (2018). Posing Modernity: The Black Model from Manet and Matisse to Today. New Haven and London: Yale University Press.
- Reff, Theodore (1977). Manet: Olympia. New York: The Viking Press, Inc.
