= Adolphe Brune =

French painter

Adolphe Brune was a French artist born in Paris in 1802 and painted religious subjects, portraits, still life, and mural compositions. He studied under Gros, and made his debut at the Salon of 1833 with an 'Adoration of the Magi.' He was subsequently employed on various public buildings. He decorated the 'Salle des Séances' of the Senate in the Luxembourg, and the ceiling of the Bibliothèque of the Louvre. Brune died in 1880.

== Works ==
He has three tables in the hall of the palace of the Senate (1861), the ceiling of the new library at the Louvre (1861), the painting of the chapel of St. Catherine in the Saint-Roch church in Paris and in the galleries of Versailles, the portraits of Louis XII, of Charles IX, of Claude Annebaut, Paul de la Barthe, of Ney.

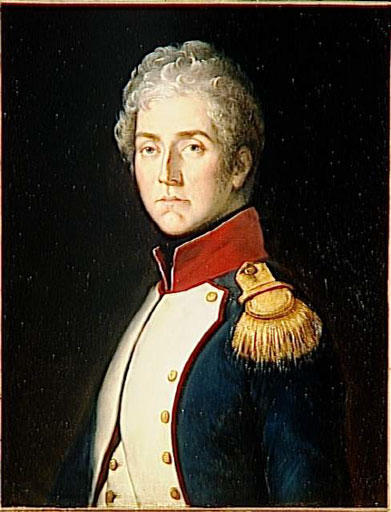
Gabriel Jean Joseph Molitor, portrait from 1834, now at the Palace of Versailles

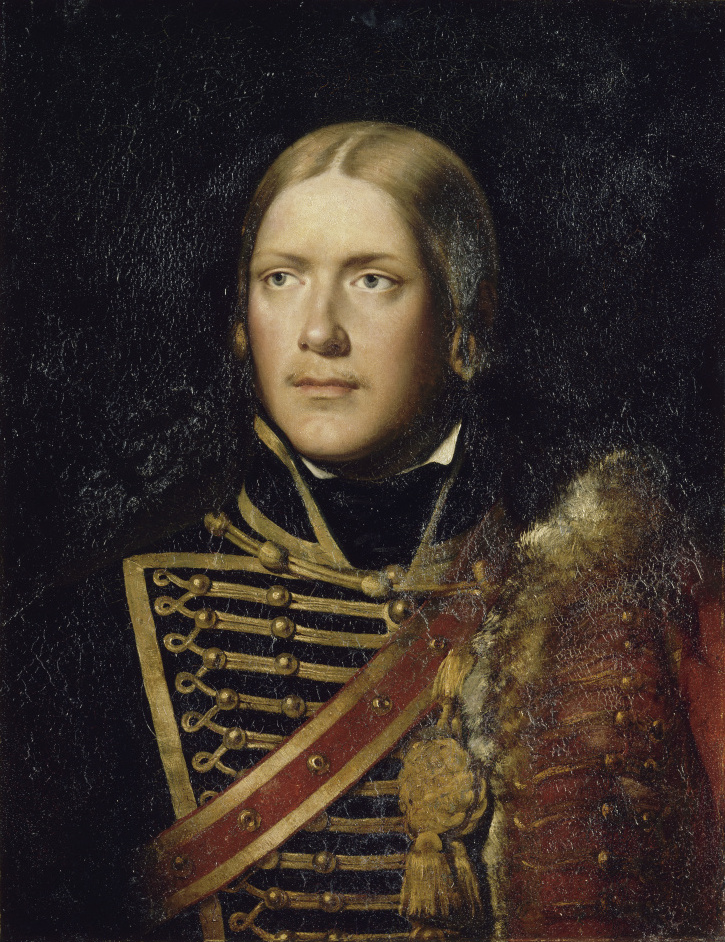
Michel Ney, portrait from 1834, now at the Palace of Versailles.

Joseph le nègre- Musée de Cahors Henri-Martin
