= Choker =

Close-fitting necklace

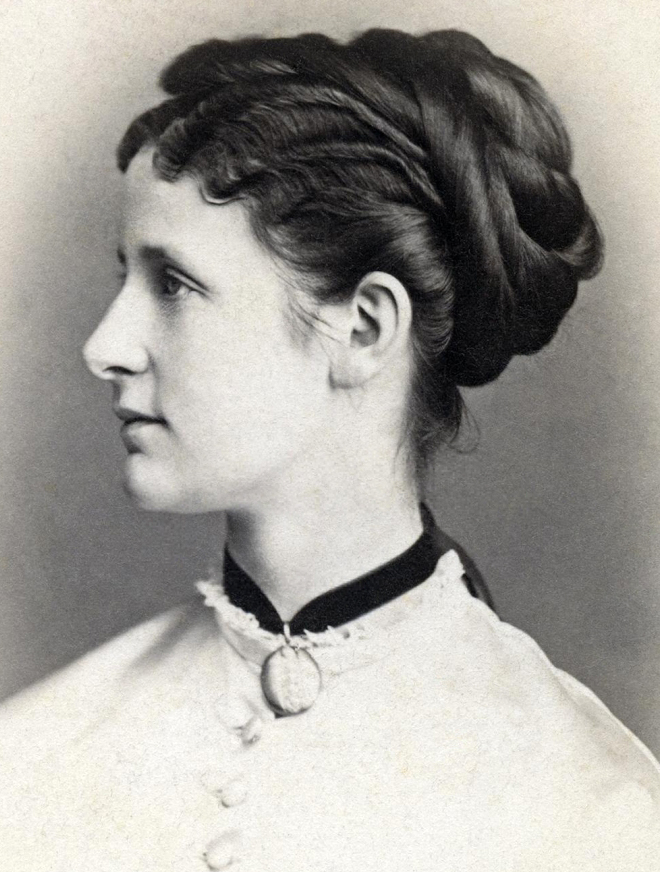
Princess Maria Annunciata of Bourbon-Two Sicilies

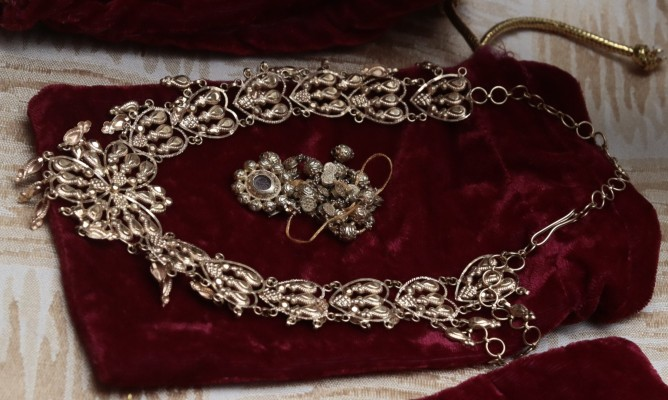
Filigree choker of Our Lady of Porta Vaga

A choker is a close-fitting necklace worn around the neck, typically 14 inch to 16 inch in length. Chokers can be made of a variety of materials, including velvet, plastic, beads, latex, leather, metal, such as silver, gold, or platinum, etc. They can be adorned in a variety of ways, including with sequins, studs, or a pendant.

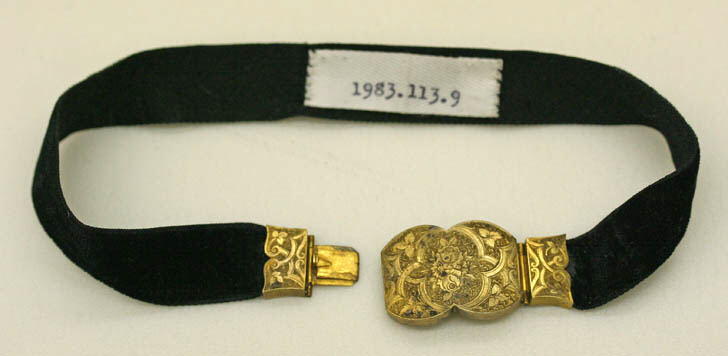
American silk and metal choker from the 1870s

== History ==
Golden choker necklaces were crafted by Sumerian artisans around 2500 BC and according to curators from the Jewelry Museum of Fine Arts, chokers have been around for thousands of years, appearing in Ancient Egypt, in addition to the Sumerians in Mesopotamia. Often made with gold or lapis, the necklaces were thought to be protective and imbued with special powers.

Chokers were also later worn in the 1st century A.D. They are mentioned in the Talmud, book Shabbat, chapter 6 as a common women's accessory.

=== 19th century ===
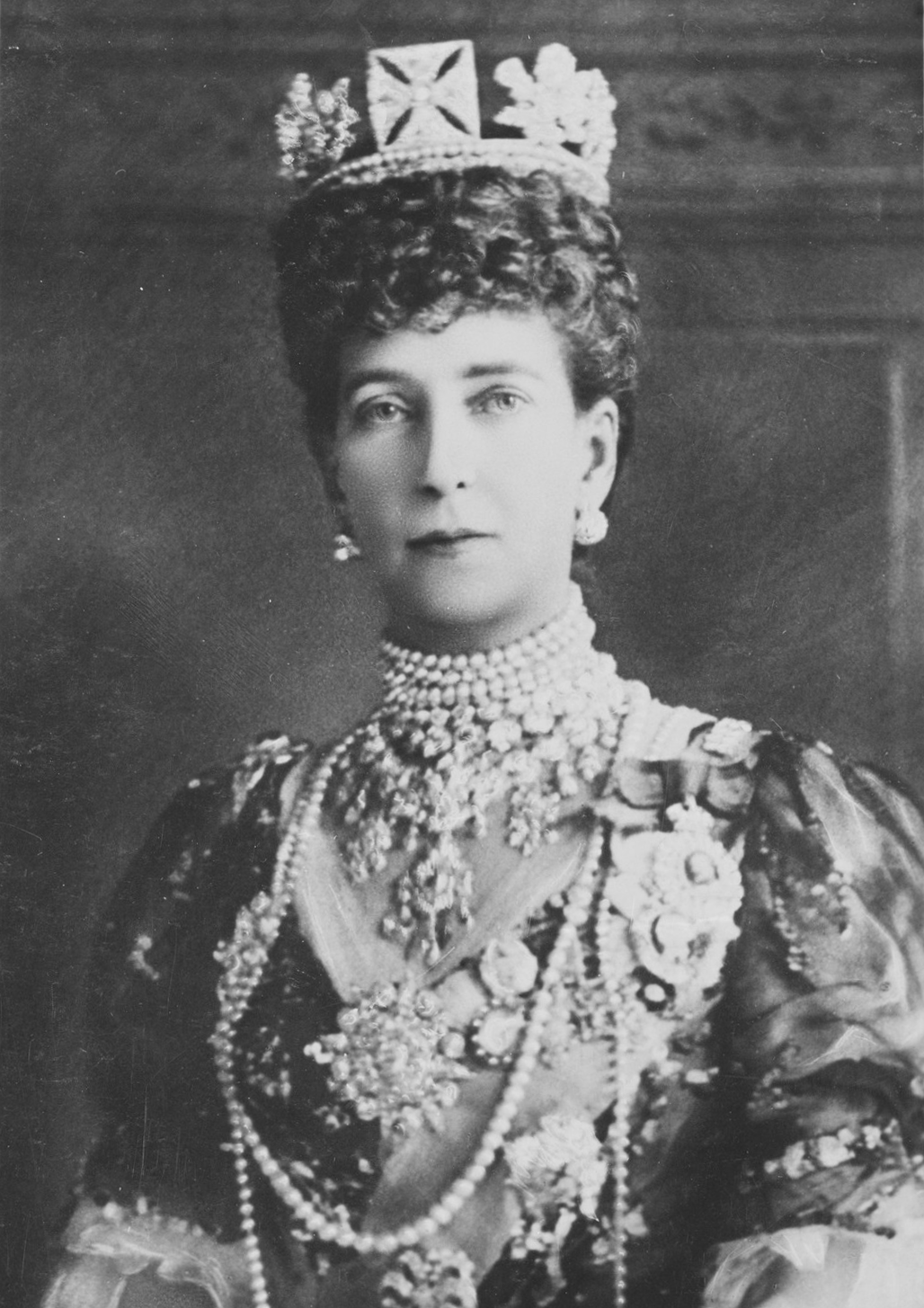
Queen Alexandra

Neck accessories similar to chokers could be seen commonly throughout the century.

Ballerinas and the upper class in the late 19th century commonly wore certain types of chokers. However, at that same time, in the late 19th century, a plain, thin, red or black ribbon choker had ties to prostitution, as seen in Manet's Olympia (1861).

The 19th-century fashion for broad chokers reached its peak around 1900 in part due to Queen Alexandra of the United Kingdom wearing one to hide a small scar. Chokers were popular into the 1920s and again in the '40s as colliers de chien. In particular, the term dog collars or colliers de chien caught on, and these designs — incorporating luxe diamonds, pearls, lace, and velvet could be seen as objects of the elite because the best kinds were custom-made to fit one's neck perfectly. In 1944 Life magazine stated that "a dowager fashion of 40 years ago" was being revived by young women, illustrating the trend with photos of models wearing the now vaguely rebellious "dog collars".

== Modern fashion ==
In the modern era, chokers have been popular with some celebrities, including Gwyneth Paltrow, who wore one to the 1999 Academy Awards. Paris Hilton wore three inches of Swarovski around her neck in 2002. Rihanna has also been featured wearing chokers.

In the 2010s, the choker became a popular fashion among transgender women, due not only to its association with femininity but also because of its potential to hide the Adam's apple without performing a tracheal shave.
