= Klaus Berger (art historian) =

German art historian (1901–2000)

Klaus Berger (24 March 1901 - 13 February 2000) was a German art historian and professor at the University of Kansas. He wrote books on Gericault, Odilon Redon and Japonisme.

== Selected publications ==
- Das Problem der Entwicklung in der modernen Kunstwissenschaft. Erster Teil: Wölfflins Formauffassung und ihr Umkreis. Dissertation, Ms.; Auszug in: Jahrbuch der Philosophischen Fakultät Göttingen. 1924, S. 1–12.
- Géricault. Drawings and Watercolors. Bittner, Recklinghausen 1946.
- als Herausgeber: French Master Drawings of the Nineteenth Century. Harper, New York 1950.
- Géricault und Sein Werk. Schroll, Wien 1952 (engl. Übersetzung: Géricault and His Work. University of Kansas Press, Lawrence 1955)
- Odilon Redon. Phantasie und Farben. DuMont Schauberg, Köln 1964 (engl. Übersetzung: Odilon Redon. Fantasy and Colour). Weidenfeld & Nicolson, London 1964.
- Stilstrukturen des 19. Jahrhunderts. In: Zeitschrift für Ästhetik und allgemeine Kunstwissenschaft. NS 12, 1967, S. 192–203 [Festschrift Joseph Gantner].
- Japonismus in der westlichen Malerei 1860–1920. Prestel, München 1980 (engl. Übersetzung: Japonisme in Western Painting from Whistler to Matisse. Cambridge University Press, Cambridge 1992)
- (Übers.) Moritz Geiger: The Significance of Art. A Phenomenological Approach to Aesthetics. Center for Advanced Research in Phenomenology and University Press of America, Lanham 1986 (Übersetzung von M. Geiger: Die Bedeutung der Kunst. Zugänge zu einer materialen Wertästhetik)
