= Esben and the Witch discography =

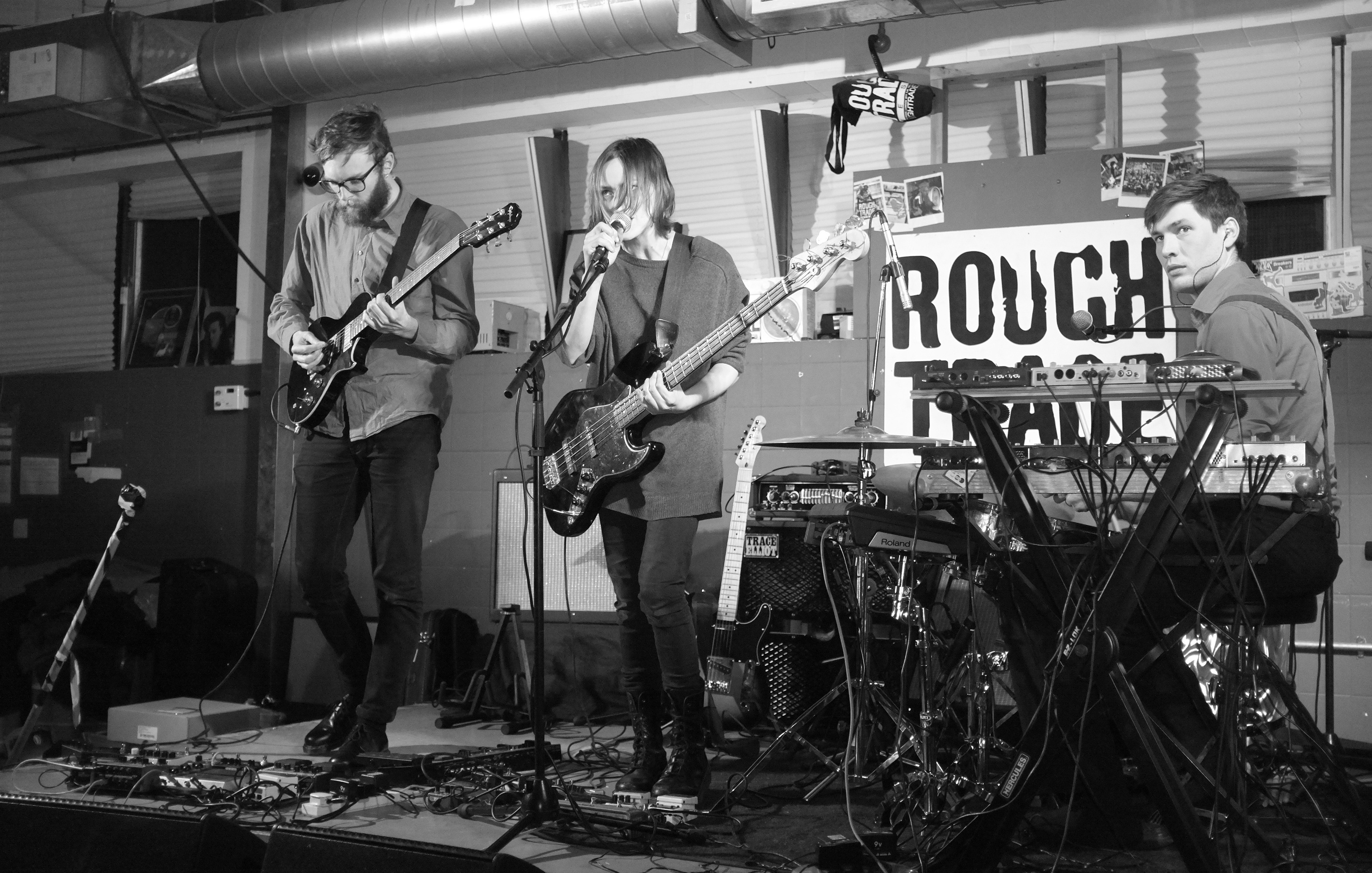
- Performing in London, January 2013
- Studio albums: 6
- EPs: 4
- Singles: 4
- Music videos: 8
- Promotional singles: 2

The discography of British rock band Esben and the Witch consists of two released albums, one upcoming album, three extended plays, four singles, two promotional singles and 8 music videos. In 2009 they self-released their debut EP 33, then released their debut single "Lucia, at the Precipice" on Too Pure in February 2010. They then signed to Matador Records and released their debut single for the label "Marching Song" in October 2010. This was followed by the "Warpath" single the same month, then their debut album Violet Cries in January 2011. They released the final single from the album, "Chorea", in April 2011. In October 2012 they released the promotional single for "Deathwaltz", followed by their second album Wash the Sins Not Only the Face in January 2013. They have since left Matador and plan to create their own label. They are going to work with Steve Albini on their third album in summer 2014, and plan to release it by Autumn 2014. They are on PledgeMusic, which is an online Direct-to-Fan music platform that facilitates musicians reaching out to their fanbase (termed Pledgers) to pre-sell, market, and distribute music projects including recordings, music videos, and concerts. On PledgeMusic they are putting pre-orders for their third album up, in which some include a hand-made bonus EP called And New Life Blossoms From the Ruins, and the money will go towards the recording costs. On 7 April 2014 they will release a split EP with Thought Forms, featuring two new songs "No Dog" and "Butoh".

== Studio albums ==
Title	Details	Peak chart positions			
Title	Details	UK Albums Chart	UK Indie	Indie Breakers	UK Record Store
Violet Cries	Released: 31 January 2011; Label: Matador Records; Formats: CD, LP, DD	116	13	3	—
Wash the Sins Not Only the Face	Released: 21 January 2013; Label: Matador Records; Formats: CD, LP, DD	—	—	13	8
A New Nature	Released: 1 September 2014; Label: Nostromo Records; Formats: CD, LP, DD	—	—	—	—
Older Terrors	Released: 4 November 2016; Label: Season of Mist Records; Formats: CD, LP, DD	—	—	—	—
Nowhere	Released: 16 November 2018; Label: Season of Mist Records; Formats: CD, LP, DD	—	—	—	—
Hold Sacred	Released: 12 May 2023; Label: Nostromo Records; Formats: CD, LP, DD	—	—	—	—

== Extended plays ==
Title	Details
33 EP	Released: 2009; Label: Self-released; Format: CD
Hexagons	Released: 7 November 2011; Label: Matador Records; Format: DD
Untitled EP	Released: 7 April 2014; Label: Invada Records; Format: 12" silver vinyl, DD; Split EP with Thought Forms
We Melted the Wax, Now We Can See	Released: 13 December 2015; Label: Nostromo Records; Format: CD, DD

== Live albums ==
Title	Details
Live at Roadburn	Released: 24 November 2017; Label: Nostromo Records; Format: LP, DD

== Singles ==
Year	Title
2010	"Lucia, at the Precipice": Format: 7"; Released: 8 February 2010
2010	"Marching Song": Format: 12"; Released: 11 October 2010; #50 in the Billboard Hot Singles Sales
2010	"Warpath": Format: Digital Download; Released: 25 October 2010
2011	"Chorea": Format: 12"; Released: 16 April 2011 (Record Store Day 2011)
2014	"Blood Teachings": Format: Digital Download; Released: June 2014

== Promotional singles ==
Year	Title
2012	"Deathwaltz": Format: Digital Download; Released: 26 October 2012
2013	"Slow Wave": Format: CD; Released: 2013
