= Untitled =

Untitled may refer to:

== Artworks ==
The following artworks are sorted by the name of their artist.

=== B ===
- Untitled (Pope), a c. 1954 panel painting by Francis Bacon
- Untitled (2004), by Banksy
- Untitled (1982 Basquiat devil painting), by American artist Jean-Michel Basquiat
- Untitled (1982 Basquiat skull painting), by Jean-Michel Basquiat
- Untitled (Fishing), a 1981 painting by Jean-Michel Basquiat
- Untitled (History of the Black People), a 1983 painting by Jean-Michel Basquiat
- Untitled (One Eyed Man or Xerox Face), a 1982 painting by Jean-Michel Basquiat
- Untitled (Pollo Frito), a 1982 painting by Jean-Michel Basquiat
- Untitled (Skull), a 1981 painting by Jean-Michel Basquiat
- Untitled (Tar Tar Tar, Lead Lead Lead), a 1981 painting by Jean-Michel Basquiat
- Untitled (Jeffersonville), a 1970 public artwork by Barney Bright

=== E ===
- Untitled (Evans), a 1972 sculpture by Garth Evans

=== F ===
- Untitled (Falsetti), a 1960 sculpture by Joe Falsetti
- Untitled (Richard Fleischner artwork at Alewife station), a 1985 public art installation in Massachusetts

=== G ===
- Untitled (1995 painting by Ellen Gallagher), a painting in Boston, Massachusetts
- Untitled (1996 painting by Ellen Gallagher), a painting in Los Angeles
- Untitled (1998 painting by Ellen Gallagher), a painting in Edinburgh, UK
- Untitled (1999 painting by Ellen Gallagher), a painting in Chicago
- "Untitled" (Perfect Lovers), a 1987–1990 and 1991 found object sculpture by Félix González-Torres
- "Untitled" (Portrait of Ross in L.A.), a 1991 work by Félix González-Torres
- Untitled (Gordin), a 1969 bronze sculpture by Sidney Gordin

=== H ===
- Untitled (Hardy), a 1952 fountain and sculpture by Tom Hardy
- Untitled (Haring, 1982), by Keith Haring
- Untitled Series (with Sean Kalish), a 1989–90 series of untitled etchings, drawn by Keith Haring and Sean Kalish
- Untitled (Urban Wall), a 1973 mural by Austrian artist Roland Hobart
- Untitled (1981 painting by Clementine Hunter), in Washington, D.C.

=== J ===
- Untitled (1967 Judd sculpture), a sculpture by Donald Judd in Indianapolis

=== K ===
- Untitled (Ellsworth Kelly), a 1986 steel sculpture in Washington, DC
- Untitled (Lee Kelly, 1973), a sculpture in Olympia
- Untitled (Lee Kelly, 1975), a sculpture in Seattle
- Untitled (Killmaster), a 1977 steel and porcelain enamel sculpture by John Killmaster
- Untitled (Krol), a 1973 public artwork by Ronald W. Krol

=== L ===
- Untitled (The Birth), a 1938 tempera painting by American artist Jacob Lawrence

=== M ===
- Untitled (Hoosier mural), a 1972 outdoor mural by Peter Mayer
- Untitled (McMakin), a 2004–2007 sculpture by Roy McMakin
- Untitled (collection), a 1998 fashion collection by Alexander McQueen
- Untitled (Rape Scene), a 1973 performance art work by Ana Mendieta
- Untitled (Morrison), a 1977 painted aluminum sculpture by Ivan Morrison

=== R ===
- Untitled (Rosati), a 1976 public art work by James Rosati
- Untitled (Rothko), a 1952 painting by Mark Rothko
- Untitled (Black on Grey), a 1970 painting by Mark Rothko
- Untitled (Rückriem), a 1987 granite sculpture by Ulrich Rückriem

=== S ===
- Untitled (L's), a 1980 public sculpture by David Von Schlegell
- Untitled (Shapiro, 1989), a bronze abstract sculpture by Joel Shapiro
- Untitled (Shapiro, 1990), a sculpture by Joel Shapiro
- Untitled [Senior Thesis], a 2008 performance art work by Aliza Shvarts
- Untitled (Jazz Musicians), a 1995 outdoor sculpture by John Spaulding

=== T ===
- Untitled (free still), a series of artworks by Rirkrit Tiravanija
- Untitled (IUPUI Letters), a 2008 public sculpture the New York City firm Two Twelve

=== W ===
- Untitled (West), a 1977 steel sculpture by Bruce West
- Untitled (Wool), a 2013 bronze sculpture by Christopher Wool

== Film and television ==
- (Untitled) (2009 film), a comedy starring Adam Goldberg and Marley Shelton
- Untitled (2011 film), a horror film by Shaun Troke
- Untitled, a 2001 cut of the 2000 film Almost Famous
- "Untitled" (The Amazing Digital Circus), a 2025 episode
- "Untitled", an episode of Law & Order
- "Untitled", an episode of Monty Python's Flying Circus
- "Untitled", an episode of Six Feet Under
- "Untitled" (Space Ghost Coast to Coast), a television episode

== Music ==
=== Albums ===
- Untitled (Arashi album) (2017)
- Untitled (The Armed album) (2015)
- Untitled (Bass Communion Box) (2014)
- (Untitled) (The Byrds album) (1970)
- Untitled (Five Pointe O album) (2002)
- Untitled (Jack DeJohnette album) (1976)
- Untitled (Led Zeppelin album) (1971), better known as Led Zeppelin IV
- Untitled (Marc and the Mambas album) (1982)
- Untitled (mewithoutYou album), (2018)
- Untitled (R. Kelly album) (2009)
- Untitled Rammstein album (2019), also known as Rammstein
- Untitled (The Rembrandts album) (1992)
- Untitled (Terri Walker album) (2003)
- Untitled (Trooper album) (1980)
- Untitled (Wintersleep album) (2005)
- Untitled (Black Is), by Sault (2020)
- Untitled (God), by Sault (2022)
- Untitled (Rise), by Sault (2020)
- Untitled, by Dälek (2010)
- Untitled, by Demarco (2008)

=== EPs ===
- Untitled (Hodgy Beats EP) (2012)
- [untitled] (mewithoutYou EP) (2018)
- Untitled (Thought Forms and Esben and the Witch EP) (2014)
- Untitled (Scoop), by the Notwist (2002)
- Untitled (Selections from 12), by the Notwist (1997)

=== Songs ===
- "Untitled (How Does It Feel)", 2000, by D'Angelo from Voodoo
- "Untitled (How Could This Happen to Me?)", 2004, by Simple Plan from Still Not Getting Any...
- "Untitled" (The Smashing Pumpkins song), 2001, by Smashing Pumpkins
- "Untitled" (Jolin Tsai song), 2022, by Jolin Tsai
- "Untitled" (The Cure song), 1989, by the Cure from Disintegration
- "Untitled", 1997, by Blink-182 from Dude Ranch
- "Untitled", 2006, by Brand New from The Devil and God Are Raging Inside Me
- "Untitled", 1995, by Collective Soul from Collective Soul
- "Untitled", 2011, by Matt Corby, from Into the Flame
- "Untitled", 1993, by Crash Test Dummies from God Shuffled His Feet
- "Untitled", 2007, by Dance Gavin Dance from Downtown Battle Mountain
- "Untitled", 1996, by DJ Shadow from Endtroducing.....
- "Untitled", 2010, by Eminem from Recovery
- "Untitled", 2011, by Eyes Set to Kill from White Lotus
- "Untitled", 2002, by Finch from What It Is to Burn
- "Untitled", 2002, by Five Pointe O from Untitled
- "Untitled", 1998, by Fuel from Sunburn
- "Untitled", 2001, by Fugazi from The Argument
- "Untitled", 2011, by the Gazette from Toxic
- "Untitled", 2002, by Interpol from Turn On the Bright Lights
- "Untitled", 2012, by Killer Mike from R.A.P. Music
- "Untitled", 2015, by Knuckle Puck from Copacetic
- "Untitled", 1990, by the Lemonheads from Lovey
- "Untitled", 1995, by Marilyn Manson from Smells Like Children
- "Untitled", a 2003 hidden track by Matchbook Romance from Stories and Alibis
- "Untitled", 2024, by Nelly Furtado from 7
- "Untitled", 1998, by Neutral Milk Hotel from In the Aeroplane Over the Sea
- "Untitled", 1999, by O.A.R. from Soul's Aflame
- "Untitled", 1991, by Orbital from Orbital
- "Untitled", 2006, by the Panic Channel from One
- "Untitled", 1998, by Pearl Jam from Live on Two Legs
- "Untitled", 2007, by Pig Destroyer from Phantom Limb
- "Untitled", a 2000 hidden track by Radiohead from Kid A
- "Untitled", 1988, by R.E.M. from Green
- "Untitled", 1985, by Shockabilly from Heaven
- "Untitled", 1998, by Silverchair from Godzilla: The Album
- "Untitled", 2004, by Six by Seven from 04
- "Untitled", 2001, by Songs: Ohia from Travels in Constants
- "Untitled", 2003, by Stellastarr from Stellastarr
- "Untitled", 1992, by Swans from Love of Life
- "Untitled", 1994, by Unashamed from Silence
- "Untitled", 2004, by the Wailin' Jennys from 40 Days
- "Untitled", 1995, by Whiteout from Bite It
- "Untitled", a 2010 bonus track by Blonde Redhead from Penny Sparkle
- "Untitled", 2017, by Rex Orange County from Apricot Princess
- "Untitled", 1997, by London After Midnight from Oddities
- "Untitled", 1995, by Queen from Made in Heaven

== Other uses ==
- Untitled (publication), a serial publication of the Friends of Photography from 1972–1994

== See also ==
- List of untitled musical works
- Untitled No. 1 (disambiguation)
- Untitled 2 (disambiguation)
- Untilted, an album by Autechre
- No Title, 2021 Canadian film
- Nameless (disambiguation)
- No Name (disambiguation)
- Self-titled (disambiguation)
