= Nameless =

Nameless may refer to:

== Film, television and comics ==
- Nameless (1923 film), a film directed by Michael Curtiz
- Nameless (2021 film), a Rwandan drama film directed by Mutiganda Wa Nkunda
- The Nameless (film), a 1999 Spanish horror film
- Timebomb (1991 film) (working title Nameless), an American film by Avi Nesher
- "Nameless" (Grimm), a television episode
- Nameless (comic), a 2001 story in Star Wars Tales Volume 3
- Nameless, a 2015 Image Comics miniseries by Chris Burnham and Grant Morrison

== Music ==
- Nameless (musician) (born 1976), Kenyan pop artist
- The Nameless (album) or the title song, by Cathy Davey, 2010
- "The Nameless" (song), by Slipknot, 2004
- "Nameless", a song by Despised Icon from The Ills of Modern Man, 2007
- "Nameless", a song by Lil Keed from Keed Talk to 'Em, 2018
- "Nameless", a song by Northlane from Node, 2015
- "Nameless", a song by Staind from Tormented, 1996
- "The Nameless", a song by August Burns Red from Season of Surrender, 2026

== Places ==
- Nameless, Georgia, US
- Nameless, Tennessee, US
- Nameless, Texas, US
- Nameless Creek, a stream in Indiana, US
- Nameless Island, in the Galapagos Islands, Ecuador
- Nameless Island (Alaska), US
- Nameless Point, on Right Whale Bay, Antarctica

== See also ==
- Nameless Lake (disambiguation)
- Nameless One (disambiguation)
- Anonymity
- No Name (disambiguation)
- Self-titled
- Untitled (disambiguation)
