= Self-titled (disambiguation) =

Self-titled means named with an eponym: a person, a place, or a thing, after whom or which someone or something is named.

Self-titled may also refer to:

- Self-Titled (Marcus Mumford album), 2022
- Self-Titled (Zao album), 2001
- Self-titled Album (The Audition album), 2009
- Self-titled Album (The Huntingtons album), 2002
- Self-Titled Long-Playing Debut Album, by +/-, 2002
- Self Titled or Scoop Du Jour, an album by Whirlwind Heat, 2008
- The Self-Titled Album, by Tenement, 2016
- S/T (Electric President album), 2006
- S/T (Rainer Maria album), 2017
- Self-Titled, previous band of Fearless Vampire Killers members
- "Self Titled", a song by Reks from the 2011 album Rhythmatic Eternal King Supreme

== See also ==
- Nameless (disambiguation)
- Untitled (disambiguation)
- Self-styled
- Elf Titled, an album by The Advantage
