= Wash the Sins Not Only the Face =

Studio album by Esben and the Witch
- Released: 21 January 2013
- Recorded: 4AD Studios, London, 2012
- Genre: Ethereal wave, post-rock, dream pop, alternative rock, gothic rock
- Length: 38:02
- Label: Matador Records
- Producer: Tom Morris, Esben and the Witch

Esben and the Witch chronology
Hexagons EP (2011)	Wash the Sins Not Only the Face (2013)	Untitled EP (2014)

Singles from Wash the Sins Not Only the Face
- 1. "Deathwaltz" Released: 29 October 2012; 2. "Slow Wave (promotional)" Released: 18 March 2013

Wash the Sins Not Only the Face is the second studio album by British rock band Esben and the Witch released on 21 January 2013. A deluxe version of the album was also released, which features the LP and CD version of the album and a bonus 7". The lyrics seem to be a semi-concept album as it is meant to be a journey with each song representing different parts of that journey.

The album was first announced in October along with promotional single "Deathwaltz", which was released because they felt this was a good bridge between their first album to their second. The album was received well by critics, NME said "Call it highbrow, call it highfalutin, but with Wash The Sins…, Esben are carving hulking tablets of stone boasting that intellect is nothing to be scared of. No amount of splashing can scrub that out" giving it 7/10, and Clash said "...everything about this album is bigger than what has gone before and reveals an energised band with a real belief in what they’re doing. Quite right too".

== Background ==
In 2010, Esben and the Witch signed to Matador Records and released their second single "Marching Song" in October, which charted at number 50 in the Billboard Hot Singles Sales. The same month "Warpath" was released as a single. On 31 January they released Violet Cries shortly after the band's shortlisting in the BBC's Sound of 2011 poll.

The album was well critically acclaimed and went at number 13 in the UK Indie Chart, AllMusic awarded it three and a half stars out of five, calling it "a promising and often captivating debut". NME said it was "gothic but not goth" giving it 8/10. On Record Store Day 2011, they released the "Chorea" single on 12" vinyl. In 2012, the band began to work on their next record.

== Writing and recording ==
We would all have to wait to put forward our ideas, even though we were all kind of desperate to start writing. We waited until we’d finished touring and thought we’d go away somewhere and isolate ourselves, so it’s just the three of us. No internet, no phone signal. That was my favourite part, really

— Rachel Davies, 2013

In 2012 the band began work on writing new material. Unlike their debut album, Violet Cries (2011), the lyrics were written solely by Davies. The writing for the album was done while they were isolated at White Magpie and Ariel cottage in East Sussex, where they lived, in peace, for a few months. Upon completion they went to 4AD Studios in London to record them. The songs were first recorded live in the studio. Davies said that they wanted the album to have a "warmer" sound so they co-produced the album with Tom Morris, saying that "It was great to have someone else in the process, actually, which is something which – again – we hadn’t done". During the recording process, "Deathwaltz" had originally had a waltz-like guitar tune. which was completely removed while keeping the name. "Despair" they felt was to "scrappy" that it could never fit on the album, but they like it so much they made it into what it is now.

== Lyrics and themes ==
The band said that they wanted the album to be a journey and each song is a different part of the journey. The album's title was inspired by an ancient Greek palindrome they found while touring Violet Cries. The album's opening song, "Iceland Spar", starts the journey by the sun rising at the beginning of the day. The title refers to a type of calcite named Iceland Spar. This was used by the Vikings for navigational purposes, known as the Viking Sunstone. The second track, "Slow Wave", is about dreams and your dream self. They appear to use the silver cord to represent the physical body connecting with the mental body of, in this case, the emotions in dreams.

The third song, "When That Head Splits", was inspired by the Salvador Dalí poem and painting Metamorphosis of Narcissus and the story of Narcissus saying that he was an exceptionally proud man, in that he disdained those who loved him. Nemesis saw this and attracted Narcissus to a pool where he saw his own reflection in the water and fell in love with it. Unable to embrace the watery image, he pined away, and the gods immortalized him as a Narcissus. The title of the song is a direct line from the poem, they wanted to use words from the poem to put in the song but, due to legal issues, they decided against it. The next track, "Shimmering", is supposed to be set in the full heat of the day. The title refers to the haze on the horizon and the lyrics talk about mirages and optical illusions caused by the sun. It was inspired by Camus' novel The Outsider, saying they wanted to, musically, recreate the "wooziness" of it.

The final song, of that side of the album, is "Deathwaltz", it was inspired by the film Black Swan. On the next side of the album, there is "Yellow Wood". At this point in the journey, the sun is about to set, intended to be an "evening song" saying they wanted a sense of propulsion and wonder as you travel on in the journey. The title is taken from a Robert Frost poem, about a road in the Yellow Wood. The next track, "Despair", is about doppelgängers and "making a racket". It was inspired by a book of the same name by Vladimir Nabokov, which Davies read and liked, amongst other things, the humour.

Esben and the Witch were driving through Texas at night, and saw oil pump jacks working and inspired "Putting Down the Prey". This song is about something brutal done for beautiful reasons. The ninth song, "The Fall of Glorieta Mountain", the band said is the most personal song they have ever written inspired by sitting in the back of a van on tour staring out of the window. In the journey, the sun has set and the journey is almost finished. The last song is "Smashed to Pieces in the Still of the Night", they found this written on a wall in Vienna and used it for themselves. They were once driving and all the lights were gone except for the headlamps, whilst a train came past and the driver, apparently, started to descend into madness. The journey goes into the middle of the desert and it ends by your doppelgänger confronting you saying "how long do you mean to be content?."

== Release ==
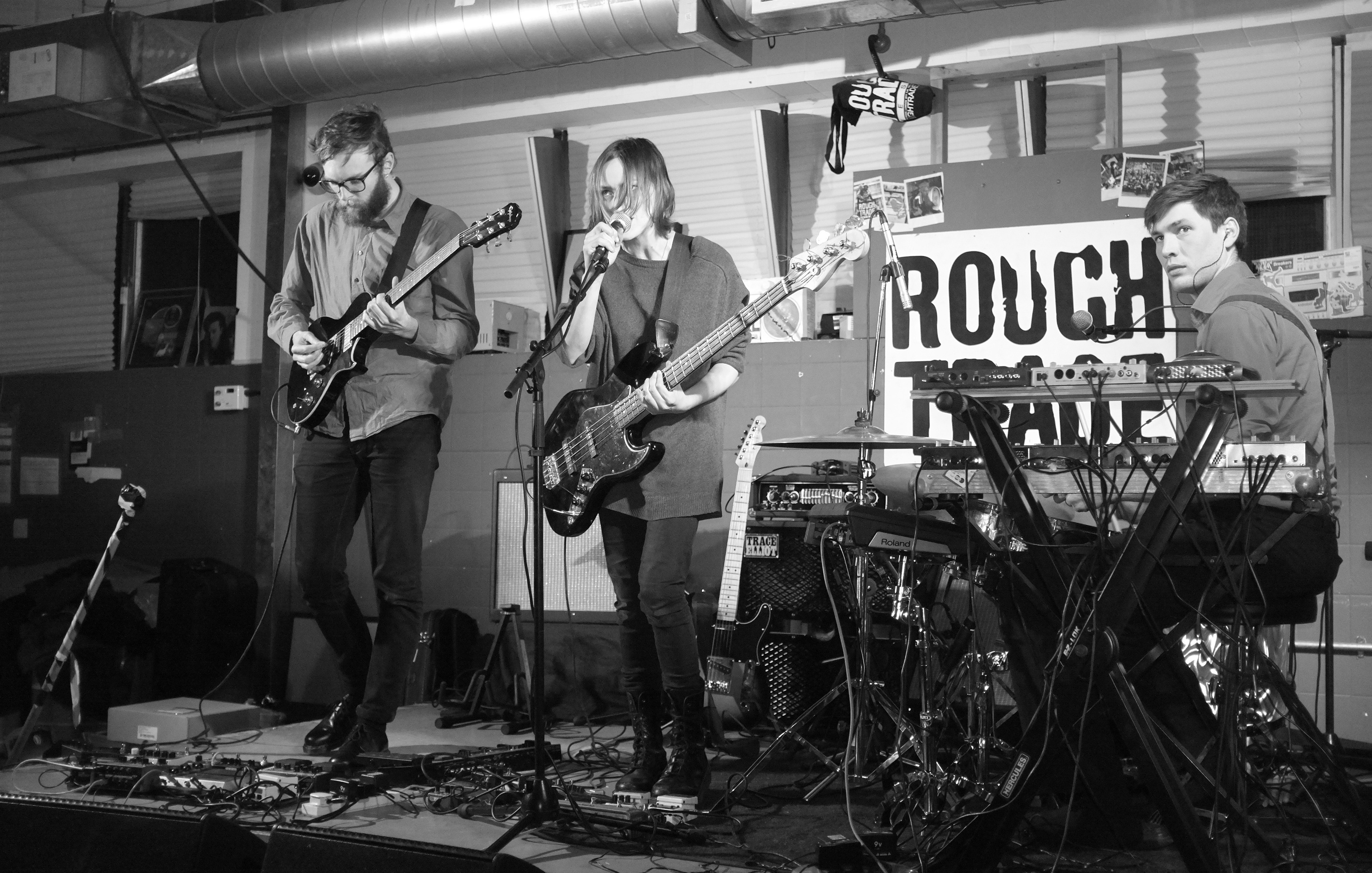
Performing in London, January 2013. From left to right: Thomas Fisher, Rachel Davies and Daniel Copeman

In October they announced Wash the Sins Not Only the Face along with single "Deathwaltz", which was chosen as the first song to be released from the album because the band felt it was a good bridge between their first album to their second. Later on in December 2012 an accompanying video was released directed by Sim Warren. A video for "Despair" was released in January, and then on 21 January 2013 they released Wash the Sins Not Only the Face on CD, digital download and vinyl record. A deluxe copy of the album was released which featured the regular vinyl copy in a gatefold sleeve, the CD copy of the album and a bonus seven-inch with two tracks not to be released on any format.

In March a promotional CD was issued for the second track "Slow Wave", but was never released on any other format to date.

In early May, the band announced that they would release a remix album. They posted a video on YouTube of short clips of each song and the album cover slowly shriveling up. The band released the six track album in late May as a free download off the band's website.

== Critical reception ==
Professional ratings
Aggregate scores
Source	Rating
Metacritic	66/100
Review scores
Source	Rating
AllMusic	4/5 stars
Clash	8/10 stars
Consequence of Sound	3/5 stars
NME	(7/10)
Pitchfork	(5.8/10.0)
The Guardian	3/5 stars
BBC	favourable

Wash the Sins Not Only the Face has seen some critical acclaim. At Metacritic, which assigns a normalized rating out of 100 to reviews from mainstream critics, the album received an average score of 66, based on 22 critics, having a higher score than Violet Cries, which had a score of 64. AllMusics Heather Phares said that "On their debut album, Violet Cries, Esben and the Witch excelled at creating a mood that was equally bewitching and ominous. When this mood collided with a memorable melody or hook, it showed just how powerful the band could be; on Wash the Sins Not Only the Face, they deliver on that promise with more nuance and more confidence", concluding with "The opposite of a sophomore slump, Wash the Sins Not Only the Face is sleek and spectral, and finds Esben and the Witch casting their spell even more successfully." Gareth James of Clash said that it was "Moody, frenzied, claustrophobic and yet hugely melodic guitar music is a heady and inviting brew. The woozy guitar sounds of 2011’s 'Violet Cries' have been kicked up a gear and Rachel Davies' vocals have come a long way, emerging Stipe-like from their previously buried state to truly occupy the band’s sound. Just like washing a car and suddenly remembering what it’s capable of looking like, the removal of the selfinflicted murkiness reveals a band at the peak of their powers", later saying "Everything about this album is bigger than what has gone before and reveals an energised band with a real belief in what they’re doing. Quite right too."

== Music videos ==
In December, a video for "Deathwaltz" was released directed by Sim Warren. The video depicts the band in a dark room playing the song while in other parts of the video it shows the bands moving their faces from side to side. Also in some parts of the video they used a slow motion camera which the band said cost more than most houses. Before the album's release, the band released the "Despair" video depicting two men dancing in a field, produced by Bradley Kulisic and Esben and the Witch. Shortly after they released the album, a video for "When That Head Splits" was released in February which features a plasticine animation which contained almost 9,000 frames animated by hand, directed by Rafael Bonilla Jr. It depicts a naked woman walking on an alien planet, as she walks on she turns into one of the creatures living there.

== Track listing ==
Regular release

1. Iceland Spar – 2:34
2. Slow Wave – 4:35
3. When That Head Splits – 4:34
4. Shimmering – 4:33
5. Deathwaltz – 4:56
6. Yellow Wood – 5:40
7. Despair – 2:50
8. Putting Down The Prey – 4:16
9. The Fall of Glorieta Mountain – 5:13
10. Smashed To Pieces in the Still of the Night – 7:31

Bonus 7"

1. Trail
2. Deathwaltz (Dave Sitek Rework)

Remixes

1. When That Head Splits (Maps)
2. Deathwaltz (David Andrew Sitek)
3. The Fall of Glorieta Mountain (Lumbers)
4. When That Head Splits (Woodpecker Wooliams)
5. Despair – The President Chews A Bind (Klad Hest)
6. Smashed To Pieces in the Still of the Night (Teeth of the Sea)

== Personnel ==
All personnel credits adapted from the album liner notes.

Esben and the Witch

- Rachel Davies – vocals, bass, guitar
- Thomas Fisher – guitar
- Daniel Copeman – electronics, synth, percussion, bass, guitar

Production

- Tom Morris and Esben and the Witch -Mixing, recording, engineering
- Gareth Jones – Mixing (2, 3, 6)
- Nick Zampiello and Rob Gonella – Mastering
- Published by Mattitude Music

Design personnel

- Esben and the Witch – Artwork
- Jonathan Hyde – Photography
- Philip Laslett – Additional layout

== Charts ==
Chart (2013)	Peak position
UK Indie Breakers Chart	13
UK Record Store	8
