= Deathwaltz =

Promotional single by Esben and the Witch

from the album Wash the Sins Not Only the Face
- Released: 29 October 2012
- Genre: Dream pop, alternative rock
- Length: 4:56
- Label: Matador Records
- Songwriter: Rachel Davies
- Producers: Tom Morris, Esben And The Witch

"Deathwaltz" is a song by British indie rock band Esben and the Witch, released as a promotional single in October 2012. The song was featured in October as one of NMEs 'Ten Tracks You Have To Hear This Week' saying 'This hazy, surprisingly sweetly sung taster leaves you wanting more.

The song is inspired by the film Black Swan, the name comes from the original guitar tune that was in waltz time but was eventually removed but the name was kept. In October, along with the details of the album, was released as the first single off the album because they felt it was a good 'bridge' between Violet Cries and Wash the Sins Not Only the Face.

Later in December 2012, a music video was made to promote the album, directed by Sim Warren. The video depicts the band in a dark room playing the song while in other parts of the video it shows the bands moving their faces from side to side. Also in some parts of the video they used a slow motion camera which the band said cost more than most houses.

== Track listing ==
iTunes single

1. "Deathwaltz" – 4:58

== Personnel ==
Song credits

- Rachel Davies – vocals, bass, guitar
- Thomas Fisher – guitar
- Daniel Copeman – electronics, synth, percussion, bass, guitar
- Esben And The Witch, Jonathan Hyde - Artwork
- Nick Zampiello & Rob Gonella at New Alliance East – Mastering
- Published by mattitude music
- Tom Morris and Esben And The Witch - Mixing

Video credits

- Directed by: Sim Warren
- Director of Photography: John Muschamp
- Focus puller / Camera Assistant: Sam Irwin
- Production Manager: Mia Xerri
- Slow Motion Camera: Quench Studios
- Lighting Assistants: Max Cutting, Andrew Jezard
- Runner: Andrew Pearce
