= Untitled 2 =

Untitled 2 may refer to:

- Untitled 2 (EP), by Hodgy Beats, 2013
- "Untitled 02 | 06.23.2014.", a 2016 song by Kendrick Lamar
- "Untitled 2", a song by the Huntingtons from Self-titled Album

== See also ==
- "Untitled 08 | 09.06.2014.", a 2016 song by Kendrick Lamar, known as "Untitled 2" prior to its release
- Untitled (disambiguation)
