= William Toye =

William Toye may refer to:

- William J. Toye (1913–2018), American art forger
- William Toye (author) (1926–2024), Canadian writer
