= Nanashi =

Nanashi may refer to:

- Nanashi, also known as 774, a Japanese manga artist, author of Don't Toy With Me, Miss Nagatoro
- Nanashi, protagonist of the anime film Sword of the Stranger
- Nanashi (MÄR), a character in the manga series MÄR

== See also ==
- No Name (disambiguation)
