= The Good, the Bad and the Ugly (disambiguation) =

The Good, the Bad and the Ugly is a 1966 Italian film directed by Sergio Leone.

It may also refer to:

- The Good, the Bad and the Ugly (TV series), a 1979 Hong Kong TV series
- Good Bad & Ugly, an Indian Malayalam-language film directed by V. R. Rathish
- Good Bad Ugly, an Indian Tamil-language film directed by Adhik Ravichandran

== Music ==
- The Good, the Bad and the Ugly (soundtrack), a 1966 soundtrack of the film
  - "The Good, the Bad and the Ugly" (theme), the title theme of the film
- The Good, the Bad, the Ugly (Willie Colón album), 1975 album by Willie Colón with Héctor Lavoe
- The Good, the Bad, the Ugly (Frankee album), a 2004 album by Frankee
- Live: The Good, the Bad and the Ugly, a 1999 album by the Huntingtons
