= Fun and Games (The Huntingtons album) =

Studio album by The Huntingtons
- Released: June 3, 1997
- Recorded: January 17–26, 1997
- Studio: Sonic Iguana, Lafayette, Indiana
- Genre: Punk rock
- Label: Flying Tart
- Producer: Mass Giorgini

The Huntingtons chronology
Rocket to Ramonia (1996)	Fun and Games (1997)	High School Rock (1998)

Professional ratings
Review scores
Source	Rating
AllMusic	4/5 stars

Fun and Games is an album by the Huntingtons released in 1997 on Flying Tart Records.

== Track listing ==
All songs written by Huntingtons, except track 14 (Ritchie Valens).

1. Alison's The Bomb
2. Bubblegum Girl
3. Lucy's About To Lose Her Mind
4. The Only One
5. Huntingtons At The Beach
6. All She Knows (Is Breakin' My Heart)
7. Losing Penny
8. She's A Brat
9. Friday Nights At The Rec
10. Goddess And The Geek
11. Don't Beat Me Up
12. Crackhead
13. Leave Home
14. Come On Let's Go

== Personnel ==
- Mike Holt: Vocals/bass
- Cliff Powell: Guitar/vocals
- Mike Pierce: Drums
- Brad Ber: Guitar/vocals

=== Additional musicians ===
- Joe Queer - vocals on tracks 5 & 11, guitar solo on track 5
- Dan Lumley - tambourine on track 4
- Tommy Tantrum - additional rhythm guitar

=== Production ===
- Produced by Mass Giorgini
- Engineered by Mass Giorgini and Jeff Hansell
- Second engineer/drum tech: Dan Lumley
- Mixed, edited and sequenced by Mass Giorgini.
- Mastered by Barry Quinn at Masterfonics
