= The Huntingtons =

American punk band

Huntingtons

Background information
- Origin: Baltimore, Maryland, U.S.
- Genre: Punk rock
- Years active: 1993–2005, 2009–present
- Members: Mikey; Cliffy; Josh; Chris
- Past members: Mikee; Tommy; Bradley; A. Jay; Danny; Davey; C.J.; Danny No. 2; Marty; J.R.; Andy; Tom; Rick

Huntingtons are a punk band from Baltimore, Maryland which formed in 1994 in the Maryland and Delaware area by Cliff Powell (a.k.a. Cliffy Huntington), Mike Holt (a.k.a. Mikey Huntington) and Mike Pierce (a.k.a. Mikee Huntington). The band is heavily influenced by the Ramones and has extensively toured with numerous ramonescore bands.

== Background ==
Huntingtons debut album, Sweet Sixteen, was released in 1996 by Flying Tart Records. The cover for the album was lifted from The Naturals cover of the same name. A few months later, their first attempt at recording Ramones covers, entitled Rocket to Ramonia saw limited release via the Burnt Toast Vinyl label. Second guitarist, Tom Rehbein (later in Small Towns Burn a Little Slower)joined the band, and after working with producer Mass Giorgini for the band's next album, Fun and Games, Tom was replaced by Brad Ber. In 1998, the band signed to Tooth & Nail Records and released High School Rock.

After touring for the High School Rock release, the band dialed in their ramonescore sound and released five albums in a one-year period. Live: The Good, the Bad and the Ugly, File Under Ramones and Get Lost all made it into stores before 1999 was over. The band also played the first of what would become two shows as Joey Ramone's backing band at CBGB's in NYC. Plastic Surgery and Split were both released to stores in January 2000. The band went through multiple lineup at this until settling with Josh Blackway (a.k.a. Jonny Huntington) on second guitar and Josh Zimmer (a.k.a. Danny No. 2) on drums.

In early 2001, Rock 'N' Roll Habits for the New Wave, a collection of newly recorded versions of selected songs from the band's pre-Tooth & Nail era, was released. Upon completion of this record, Josh Zimmer left the band and original drummer, Mikee, came back to help the band with their next record, Songs in the Key of You, which was released in mid-2001.

In 2003 they released their final full-length album of original material Self-Titled Album, as well as a split EP, The Soothing Sounds of...

The band ended their original 10-year run in 2005 with a 30-song best-of disc, Growing Up Is No Fun: The Standards '95-'05, and played their final show at the Cornerstone Festival.

In 2007, the band reunited for a show in Elkton, Maryland and decided to continue the band on a part-time status. In 2009, the band released Punk Sounds, which included b-sides, rarities and two new tracks. Official remasters of several of their albums have also been released. Limited edition vinyl pressings of Sweet Sixteen and Fun and Games were released in mid-2011. A complete collection of the band's demos was released in early 2015 as Prime Times: The Tascam Tapes.

Since 2015, the band has been playing with the lineup of Mike Holt, Jonathan Cliff Walker, Josh Blackway and drummer Chris Eller. Blackway and Eller also tour with C. J. Ramone of the Ramones.

In 2020, the band released ¡Muerto, Cárcel O Rocanrol!, their first full-length album of original songs since 2003's Self-Titled Album. In 2021, the band returned with Back To Ramonia, a complete re-recording of their 1996 Ramones cover album, Rocket To Ramonia. 2022 saw the release of a full-length split album called Rock 'N' Roll Universal International Problem featuring four songs each by the Huntingtons and The Travoltas. 2023 brought a new live album recorded at the previous year Punk Raduno Festival in Bergamo Italy, entitled, Live At Punk Rock Raduno 5.

== Members ==
As of January 2016

Current

- Mike Holt ("Mikey"): bass guitar, lead vocals (1993–present)
- Cliff Powell ("Cliffy"): guitar, backing vocals (1993–2001, 2005–present)
- Josh Blackway ("Jonny"): guitar, backing vocals (1999–present)
- Chris Eller: drums (2015–present)

Former

- Mike Pierce ("Mikee"): drums (1994–2001, 2009)
- Tom Rehbein ("Tommy"): guitar (1996–1997)
- Brad Ber ("Bradley"): guitar (1997–1998)
- Adam Garbinski ("A. Jay"): guitar (1998–1999)
- Justin Garbinski ("Danny #1"): drums (1998–1999)
- David Petersen ("Davey"): drums (1999)
- Chad Prather ("C.J."): guitar (1999)
- Josh Zimmer ("Danny #2"): drums (1999–2001)
- Matt Kirkley ("Marty"): bass guitar, lead vocals (2000)
- JR Smith: drums (2001)
- Rick Wise: drums (2001–2005, 2007–2015)
- Andy Dibiaso: guitar, backing vocals (2001–2002 + 1 show on 9/17/15)
- Tom Giachero: guitar, backing vocals (2003–2004)

== Discography ==
=== Studio albums ===
- Sweet Sixteen (1996)
- Rocket to Ramonia (1996)
- Fun and Games (1997)
- High School Rock (1998) HM Magazine,
- Rock And Roll Radio (1998)
- File Under Ramones (1999)
- Get Lost (1999)
- Plastic Surgery (2000)
- Rock 'N' Roll Habits For The New Wave (2001)
- Songs In The Key Of You (2001)
- Self-Titled Album (2003)
- Pull the Plug (2005)
- ¡Muerto, Carcel, O Rocanrol! (2020)
- Back To Ramonia (2021)

=== Split albums ===
- Live At Drexel U (1996)
- Split (2000)
- The Soothing Sounds Of... (2003)
- Rock 'N' Roll Universal International Problem (2022)

=== Compilations ===
- Big Hits And Nasty Cuts (1996/2001)
- All The Stuff (And More)-Vol 1 (1998)
- Growing Up Is No Fun: The Standards '95–'05 (2005)
- Punk Sounds (2009)
- 1-2-3-4!: The Complete Early Years Remastered (2010)
- Prime Times: The Tascam Tapes (2015)

=== Live albums ===
- Live: The Good, The Bad And The Ugly (1999)
- Live At CBGB's (7-inch) (2021)
- Live At Punk Rock Raduno 5 (2023)

=== EPs ===
- The Only One (1997)
