= Funeral Procession (painting by Clementine Hunter) =

Painting by Clementine Hunter

- Artist: Clementine Hunter
- Year: ca. 1950
- Medium: Oil paint on board
- Location: Savannah College of Art and Design; Savannah

Funeral Procession is a painting by Clementine Hunter. It is in the collection of the Savannah College of Art and Design in Savannah, Georgia. Funeral Procession is one of many in a series of funeral procession-themed paintings by Hunter.

== Description ==
The painting depicts an African American funeral procession in Louisiana. Two men leave a church carrying a coffin decorated in flowers. A woman follows behind, holding flowers. The coffin is being carried to a freshly dug grave in the foreground, where two religious figures hold crosses over the grave. Four female figures with flowers and two male figures wait at the graveside.

== History ==
Funeral Procession was painted around 1950 by Hunter. In 2013, the piece was included in the Savannah College of Art and Design's exhibit,“Rehearsals: The Practice and Influence of Sound and Movement," for the painting's connection to the African American tradition of musical celebrations for the dead.
