= High School Rock =

1998 studio album by the Huntingtons

Studio album by the Huntingtons
- Released: May 5, 1998
- Recorded: December 2–16, 1997
- Studios: Sonic Iguana, Lafayette, Indiana
- Genre: Punk rock
- Label: Tooth & Nail
- Producer: Mass Giorgini

The Huntingtons chronology
Fun And Games (1997)	High School Rock (1998)	All the Stuff (And More)-Vol 1 (1998)

Professional ratings
Review scores
Source	Rating
HM	(not rated) link
The Phantom Tollbooth	(not rated) link
Punk News	link
Rolling Stone	(not rated) link

High School Rock is the fourth studio album by American rock band the Huntingtons, released in 1998 on Tooth & Nail Records, the band's first for the label. A remastered version was released in 2009, available as a digital download. According to the band, the album was remastered to get it sounding the way they always wanted it to sound. The remastered version includes a bonus track previously only available on vinyl. In 2021, this album was re-released by Sexy Baby Records on cassette tape with newly designed artwork.

== Track listing ==
1. High School Rock-N-Roll
2. We Don't Care
3. FFT
4. Aloha, It's You
5. I Don't Wanna Sit Around With You
6. When I Think About Her
7. Jeannie Hates The Ramones
8. I'm No Good
9. Pencil Neck
10. Stinky's All Grown Up
11. 1985
12. How Can I Miss You If You Won't Go Away?
13. Dies Saugt
14. No Luck Again
15. Jackie Is An Atheist
16. Avi Is A Vampire

== Personnel ==
- Mikey Huntington: vocals, bass
- Cliffy Huntington: guitar, vocals
- Mikee Huntington: drums
- Bradley Huntington: guitar, vocals

=== Additional musicians ===
- Teakettle Jones – casiotone
- Zac Damon – additional vocals on tracks 6, 7, 8 and 15
- Dan Lumley – tambourine

=== Production ===
- Produced and Engineered by Mass Giorgini
- Assisted by Zac Damon, Denny Muller, and Fergus Daly
- Drum Tech: Dan Lumley
  Mixed, Edited and Sequenced by Mass Giorgini.
- Mastered by Brian Gardner at Bernie Grundman's
- Executive Producer: Brandon Ebel
