= Rocket to Ramonia =

Studio album by The Huntingtons
- Released: 1996
- Recorded: 1996
- Genre: Punk rock
- Label: Burnt Toast Vinyl
- Producer: The Huntingtons

The Huntingtons chronology
Sweet Sixteen (1996)	Rocket to Ramonia (1996)	Fun and Games (1997)

Rocket to Ramonia is an album by the Huntingtons released in 1996 in cooperation with the Flying Tart Recording Company, a division of Burnt Toast Vinyl. All tracks on the album are cover versions of Ramones songs. The album title is a reference to the Ramones album Rocket to Russia.

== Track listing ==
All songs written by Ramones.

1. "Rockaway Beach"
2. "Teenage Lobotomy"
3. "Suzy Is a Headbanger"
4. "Blitzkrieg Bop"
5. "Oh Oh I Love Her So"
6. "Judy Is a Punk"
7. "I Want You Around"
8. "Cretin Hop"
9. "Slug"
10. "She's the One"
11. "Beat on the Brat"
12. "You're Gonna Kill That Girl"
13. "Sheena Is a Punk Rocker"
14. "The KKK Took My Baby Away"
15. "Rock 'N' Roll High School"

== Credits ==
- Cliffy Huntington: Guitar/Vocals
- Mikey Huntington: Vocals/Bass
- Mikee Huntington: Drums
