= File Under Ramones =

Studio album by The Huntingtons
- Released: April 1999
- Recorded: October 1998
- Genre: Punk rock
- Label: Tooth & Nail
- Producer: Holt/Powell

The Huntingtons chronology
Live: The Good, the Bad and the Ugly (1999)	File Under Ramones (1999)	Get Lost (1999)

Professional ratings
Review scores
Source	Rating
Allmusic	link
HM Magazine	(not rated) link

File Under Ramones is a Ramones tribute album by the Huntingtons released in 1999 on Tooth & Nail Records.

== Track listing ==
All songs written by Ramones, except for R.A.M.O.N.E.S. (Motörhead).

1. "Durango 95"
2. "Havana Affair"
3. "Poison Heart"
4. "Chainsaw"
5. "She's A Sensation"
6. "I Believe In Miracles"
7. "Gimme Gimme Shock Treatment"
8. "I Don't Wanna Walk Around With You"
9. "Today Your Love, Tomorrow The World"
10. "Loudmouth"
11. "I Don't Care"
12. "Pet Sematary"
13. "Bonzo Goes to Bitburg"
14. "Now I Wanna Be A Good Boy"
15. "Why Is It Always This Way?"
16. "I Remember You"
17. "Strength To Endure"
18. "I Don't Wanna Go Down To The Basement"
19. "Commando"
20. "Life's A Gas / R.A.M.O.N.E.S."

== Personnel ==
- Mikey Huntington – Vocals/Bass
- Cliffy Huntington – Guitar/Vocals
- Mikee Huntington – Drums
- C. J. Huntington – Guitar
- Terry Holt – Harmony Vocals
- Nicky Rotundo – Guitar solos on track 3
- Richie Murphy – Additional handclaps
- Nicky Rotundo – Engineer
- Brandon Ebel – Executive Producer
