= Untitled No. 1 =

Untitled No. 1 may refer to one of several musical works:

- Untitled No. 1, the first album by Father John Misty (2003)
- "Untitled #1", a single by I Am Kloot (2003) – see I Am Kloot (album) § Singles
- "Untitled #1", a song by Spain from the album The Blue Moods of Spain (1995)
- "Untitled 1," a song by Keane from the album Hopes and Fears (2004)

== See also ==
- "Vaka" (song), originally known as "Untitled #1", by Sigur Rós, from their album ( ) (2002)
- "Untitled 01 | 08.19.2014.", a song by Kendrick Lamar from the album Untitled Unmastered (2016)
- Untitled (disambiguation)
