= Clementine Hunter =

American painter

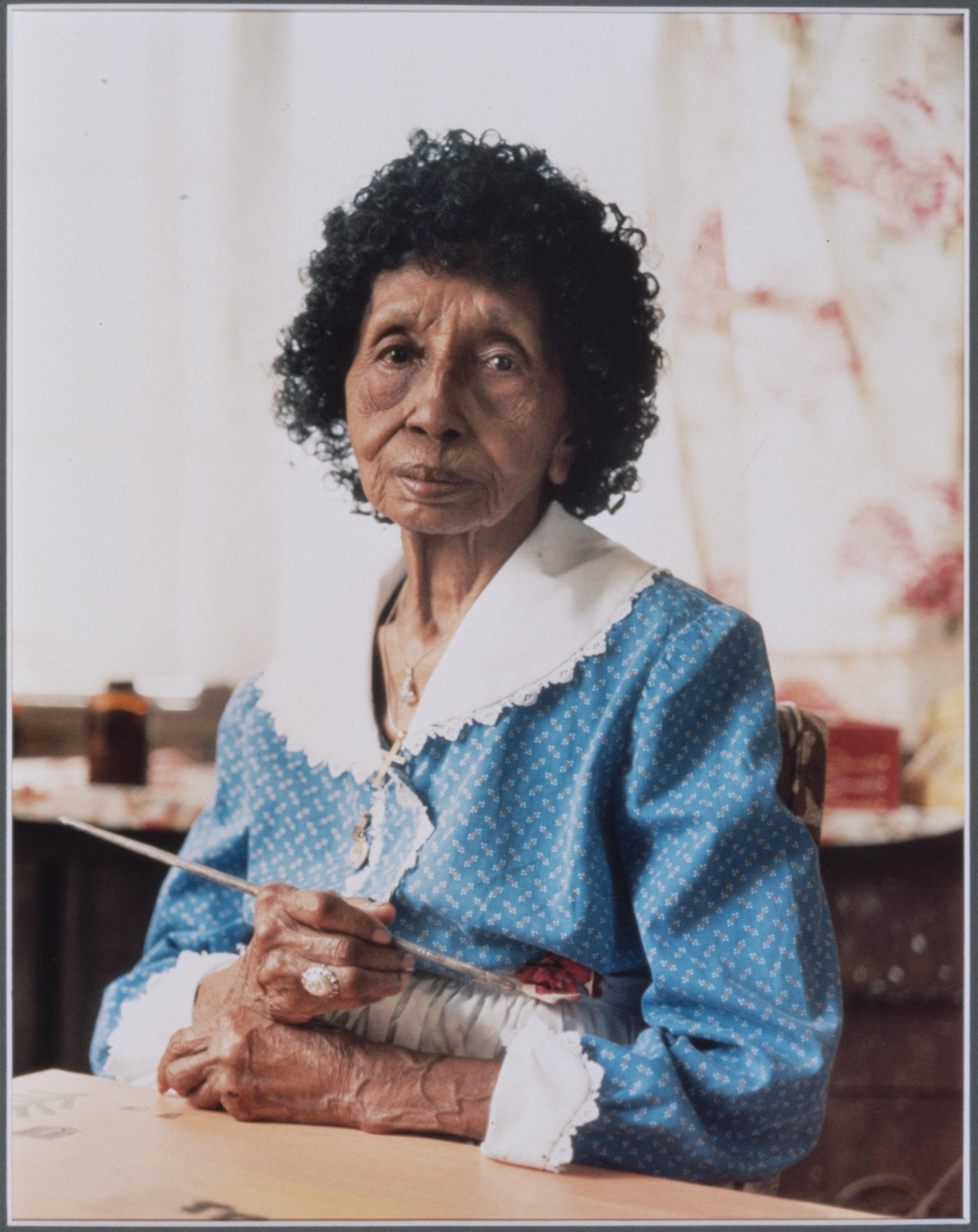
- Photograph by Judith Sedwick as part of the Black Women Oral History Project
- Born: Clementine Reuben; December 1886 or January 1887; Hidden Hill Plantation, near Cloutierville, Louisiana, U.S.
- Died: January 1, 1988 (aged 101); Natchitoches Parish, Louisiana, U.S.
- Occupation: Artist
- Years active: 1940–1980
- Known for: Paintings of Black Southern life

Clementine Hunter (pronounced Clementeen; late December 1886 or early January 1887 – January 1, 1988) was a self-taught Black folk artist from the Cane River region of Louisiana, who lived and worked on Melrose Plantation.

Hunter was born into a Louisiana Creole family at Hidden Hill Plantation near Cloutierville, in Natchitoches Parish, Louisiana. She started working as a farm laborer when she was young and never learned to read or write. In her fifties, she began to sell her paintings, which soon gained local and national attention for their complexity in depicting Black Southern life in the early 20th century.

Initially she sold her first paintings for as little as 25 cents, but by the end of her life, her work was being exhibited in museums and sold by dealers for thousands of dollars. She produced an estimated 5,000 to 10,000 paintings in her lifetime. Hunter was granted an honorary Doctor of Fine Arts degree by Northwestern State University of Louisiana in 1986, and she was the first African-American artist to have a solo exhibition at the New Orleans Museum of Art. In 2013, director Robert Wilson presented a new opera about her, entitled Zinnias: The Life of Clementine Hunter, at Montclair State University in New Jersey.

== Early life ==
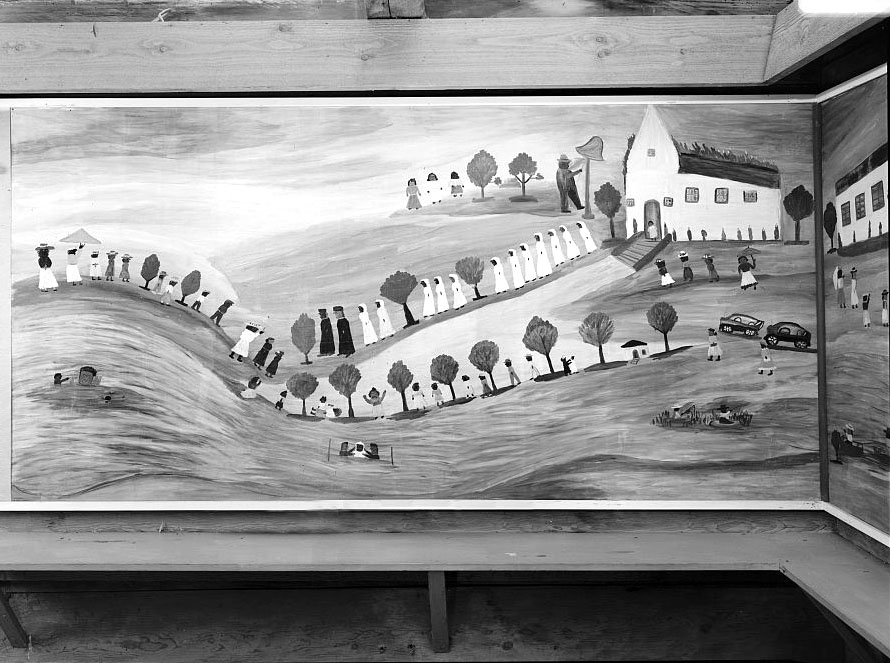
Baptism by Clementine Hunter. Mural (detail)

Clementine Hunter's exact birth date is unknown; she was born in late December 1886 or early January 1887 at Hidden Hill Plantation, near Cloutierville in Natchitoches Parish, Louisiana. She was the first of seven children born to Janvier "John" Reuben and Mary Antoinette Adams. Hunter's siblings were named Maria, Ida, Rosa, Edward, Simon, and John. Hunter's maternal grandmother Idole, an enslaved Black and Native American woman, was born in Virginia and brought to Louisiana. Her maternal grandfather was called Billy Zack Adams. Hunter's paternal grandfather, who was of mixed African, French, and Irish descent, traded horses during the Civil War; he died before she was born. Hunter knew her paternal grandmother well, a Black and Native American woman who she called MéMé (pronounced May-May). Her parents were married on October 15, 1890, in Cloutierville at the town's Catholic church, St. John the Baptist.

Hunter was baptized a Catholic on March 19, 1887, in Cloutierville, at about three months old. She was baptized Clementiam, went by the name Clémence for the first part of her life, and changed her name to Clementine after moving to Melrose Plantation. Her family called her by the nickname Tébé, the French for "little baby," a nickname she carried into adulthood.

Hunter moved to Cloutierville when she was around five years old and was sent to St. John the Baptist Catholic Church School. The school was segregated and enforced harsh rules, which Hunter cited as the reason she left school at a young age. She attended school for less than a year and never learned to read or write. Hunter began working in the fields at eight years old, picking cotton alongside her father. Throughout her early life her family moved around in the Cane River Valley while her father looked for work. At certain points they lived in Robeline, Cypress, and Alexandria.

In 1902, when Hunter was around the age of fifteen, her family moved to Melrose Plantation, where her father had been hired as a wage laborer by John H. Henry, the plantation owner. She worked there as an agricultural laborer as well, toiling six days a week for most of the year. She would pick 150 to 200 pounds of cotton a day for 75 cents in wages. In the fall, she would harvest pecans. While in her teens, Hunter took informal classes at night with other workers at Melrose Plantation. Her mother died in 1905 at Melrose.

When Hunter was about twenty in 1907, she gave birth to her first child, Joseph Dupree, called "Frenchie". Hunter's first partner was Charles Dupree, a Creole man about fifteen years her senior. Known for highly skilled labor, Charles was said to have built a steam engine with only a picture for reference. Their second child, Cora, was born a few years later. Charles Dupree and Clementine Reuben never married, and Dupree died in 1914.

In 1924, Clementine married Emmanuel Hunter, a Creole employed as a woodchopper at Melrose, who was six years her senior. Until her marriage she spoke only Creole French, and she credited Emmanuel with teaching her American English. The two lived together in a workers' cabin at Melrose Plantation and had five children, two of whom were stillborn. Hunter's children were named Agnes, King, and Mary. On the morning before giving birth to one of her children, she harvested 78 pounds of cotton before going home and calling for the midwife. She was back working a few days later.

In the late 1920s, Hunter began working as cook and housekeeper for Cammie Henry, the wife of John H. Henry. Hunter was known for her talents at adapting traditional Creole recipes, sewing intricate clothes and dolls, and tending to the house's vegetable garden. During this period, Melrose evolved into a salon for artists and writers, hosted by Cammie Henry. Using discarded tubes from the visiting artists, Clementine Hunter began to paint in the late 1930s.

In the early 1940s, Hunter's husband Emmanuel became terminally ill and bedridden. She became the sole financial provider for the family, working full time while caring for Emmanuel and painting late at night. Emmanuel died in 1944, leaving Hunter to work and care for her children alone.

During this period in the early 1940s, Hunter adopted Mary Francis LaCour, an eleven-year-old girl whose parents could no longer care for her. Hunter taught the girl how to paint and displayed her creations outside of Hunter's home. In her teens, Mary Francis moved to California to live with her father. In 1951, Mary Francis died at less than twenty years old.

== Painting career ==
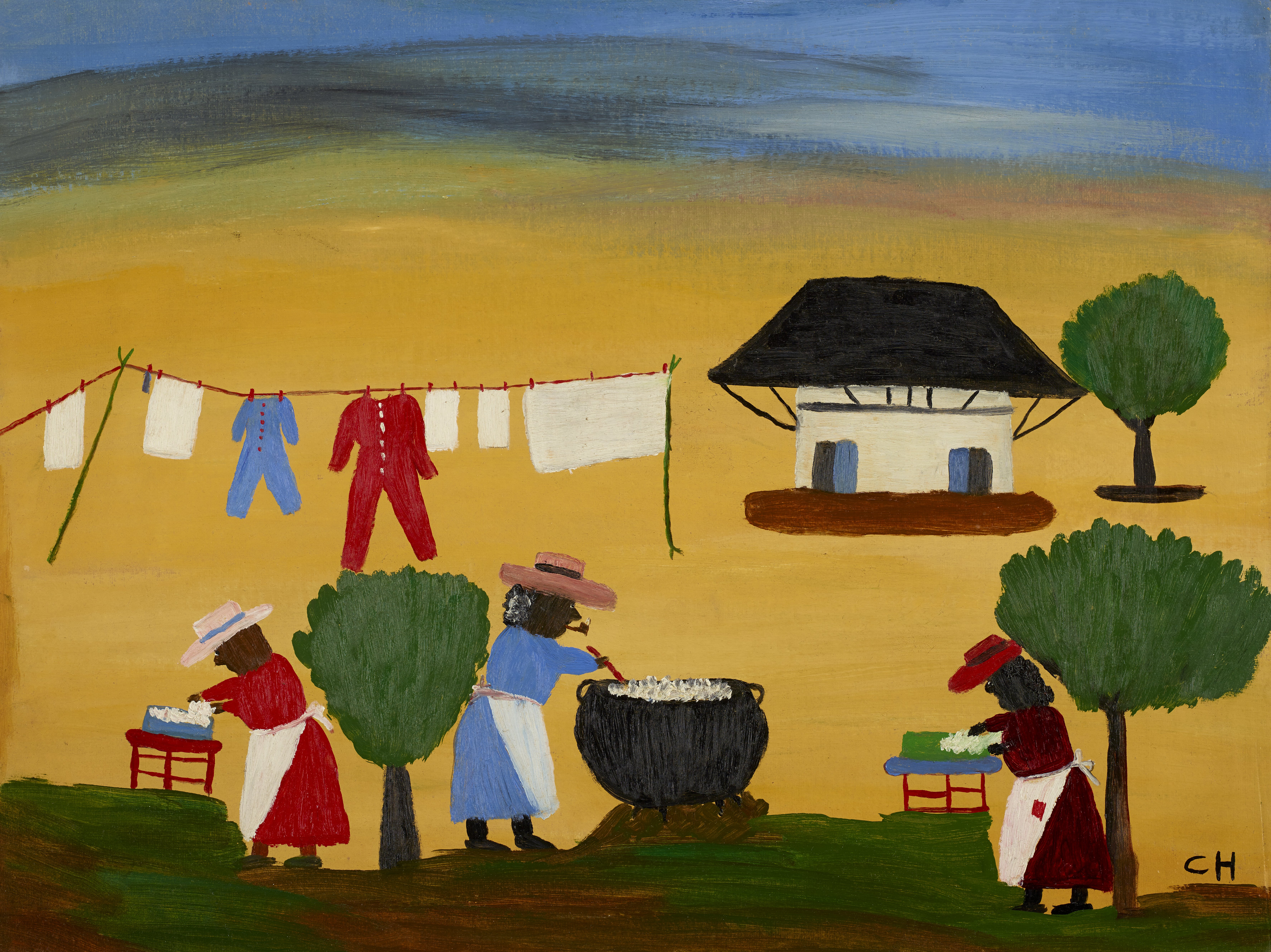
The Wash (c.1950s), Minneapolis Institute of Art

Hunter has become one of the most well-known self-taught artists. Hunter is described as a memory painter because she documented Black Southern life in the Cane River Valley in the early 20th century. She was entirely self-taught and received almost no formal education, art or otherwise. Although she was first recognized for her painting skills in 1939, Hunter related that she had been painting long before then. Her most famous work features brightly colored depictions of important events like funerals, baptisms, and weddings, as well as scenes of plantation labor and domestic chores. However, Hunter's paintings vary in subject and style, including abstracts and still lifes.

Hunter painted from memory, stating: "I just get it in my mind and I just go ahead and paint but I can't look at nothing and paint. No trees, no nothing. I just make my own tree in my mind, that's the way I paint."

Cammie Henry created an artists' colony at Melrose Plantation after the death of her husband. Numerous artists and writers visited, including Lyle Saxon, Roark Bradford, Alexander Woollcott, Rose Franken, Gwen Bristow, and Richard Avedon. The paint and brushes left behind by New Orleans artist Alberta Kinsey are frequently cited as the first materials Hunter used to paint with (on a window shade). However, Hunter was already producing narrative and expressionist work in textiles, including intricately detailed quilts. Additionally, Hunter's own accounts of her early career contradict the story of Kinsey's influence, with references to paintings she made earlier than 1939.

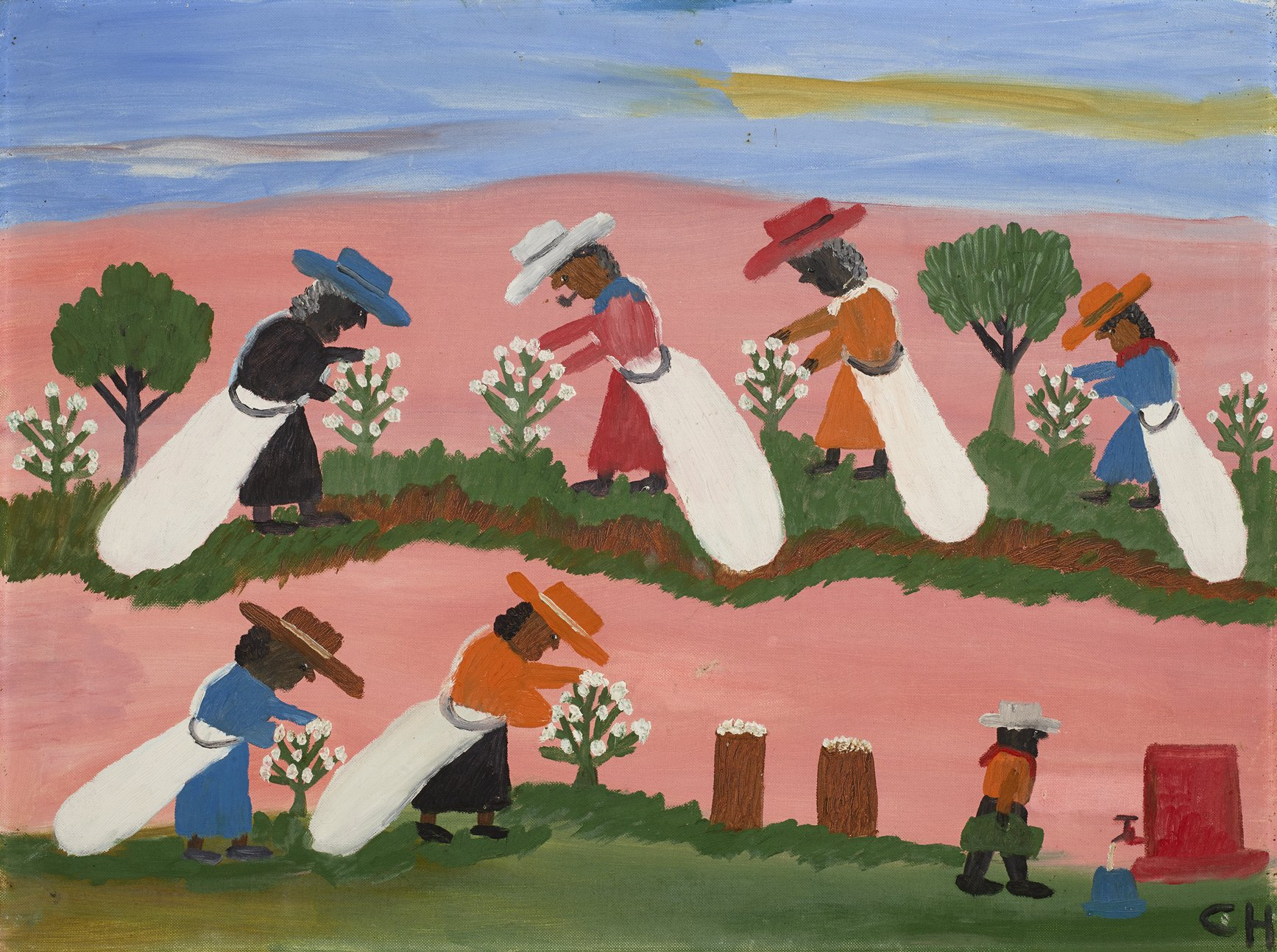
Picking Cotton (c.1955), Minneapolis Institute of Art

Hunter began selling paintings after the death of her husband, Emmanuel Hunter. On the outside of the cabin where she lived was a sign that read: "Clementine Hunter, Artist. 25 cents to Look." Her paintings were displayed in the local drugstore, where they were sold for one dollar.

Hunter's first shows were in 1945 in Rosenwald Grant, Brownwood, and Waco, Texas. In 1949, an exhibit of her paintings at the New Orleans Arts and Crafts Show garnered attention outside of the Cane River Valley. An article was published about Hunter in Look magazine in June 1953, giving her national exposure.

Hunter gained support from numerous individuals associated with Melrose Plantation, including François Mignon, who supplied her with paint and materials and promoted her artwork widely. In 1956, Hunter and Mignon coauthored Melrose Plantation Cookbook, featuring photographs of Melrose Plantation, illustrations drawn by Hunter, and recipes. Hunter was skilled at reinterpreting traditional dishes which had been orally passed down in her family.

Untitled (c.1970) at the National Gallery of Art's showing of Afro-Atlantic Histories in Washington, DC in 2022

Hunter's largest work is a series of murals in the African House at Melrose Plantation. Built in the early 19th century by enslaved people at Melrose Plantation, the African House is a Creole hybridization of various African, French, and Native American building traditions. During Cammie Henry's ownership, this building served as a residence for artists. In 1949, Clementine Hunter's first show in the Cane River Valley was hosted by Mignon in the upstairs area of the African House. Hunter painted murals in the Yucca house and the main Melrose Plantation house. In 1955, Hunter and Mignon collaborated to produce the series of paneled murals that depict the history of the Cane River Valley and reflect the artist's life. The mural consists of nine rectangular panels, each painted in Hunter's home studio. Completed over three months, the murals were finished when Hunter was sixty-eight years old.

Black Jesus (c.1985) at the National Gallery of Art's showing of Afro-Atlantic Histories in Washington, DC in 2022

Hunter's paintings changed throughout her lifetime. Her early work, such as "Cane River Baptism" from 1950, feature more earth tones and muted colors. At the start of her career, Hunter used paint left by visiting artists at Melrose Plantation; therefore she was working within other artists' palettes. Additionally, Hunter would frequently thin out her supply of paint with turpentine, creating more of a watercolor effect, which caused many scholars to mistakenly believe she had a watercolor experimental phase. With more access to painting supplies later in her career, Hunter used a wider array of colors. Beginning in the 1950s, her painting style was altered by arthritis in her hands. From this period on, she leaned more towards abstract and impressionist work, with less fine detail, because it was difficult for her to paint. In 1962, her friend James Pipes Register encouraged her to become even more abstract, resulting in works like Clementine Makes a Quilt. However, by 1964, Hunter returned to a more narrative style. In the 1980s, as she approached one hundred years old, she began painting on smaller, handheld objects like jugs and bottles.

In late 1971, sixty of Hunter's paintings were shown at an exhibition at Louisiana State University.

== Quiltmaking ==
Hunter grew up in communities of Black sharecroppers and tenant farmers, where she learned sewing, quilting, lace-making, and basket-weaving. François Mignon recognized Hunter's talents with fabrics before he saw any of her painted works. On December 19, 1939, Mignon recorded in his journals that Hunter first showed him dolls she created with embroidered features. Additionally, he wrote that she was exceptionally talented at making fringe and knew how to spin cotton. James Register also recorded Hunter's exceptional skill at making fringe in a 1972 article in the Natchitoches Times.

Hunter's quilts and tapestries feature subjects and color palettes that would later reappear in her paintings. Many of her quilts depict buildings on the Melrose grounds. "Melrose Plantation Textile" (1938/9), which is hand appliquéd and sewn, is thematically similar to her painted works. Hunter's quilts are usually not batted, which signals that they were designed to hang as a tapestry, rather than to serve a household function. Most of Hunter's textile work is owned by private collections; however, a photograph of Hunter in her home shows her using one of her chevron quilts as a couch covering.

Hunter made several quilts that are more abstract in style. One chevron quilt (1951) is at the New Orleans Museum of Art. Some of the squares of chevron are alternating solid colors, while other squares are constructed with scraps of patterned cloth. Although Hunter's abstract paintings made in 1962 and 1963 are generally regarded as a break in her canon, her earlier textile work clearly plays with abstraction and impressionism.

== Legacy and honors ==
A director of the Museum of American Folk Art in New York City described Hunter as "the most celebrated of all Southern contemporary painters."

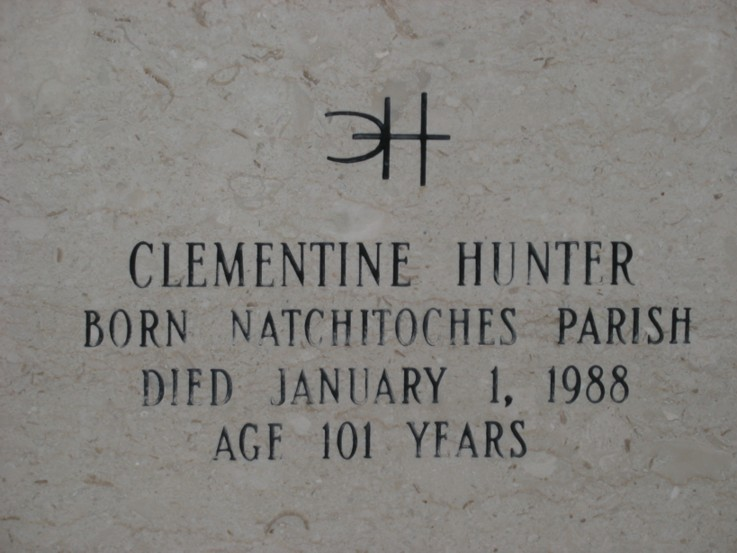
Inscription on Clementine Hunter's Gravestone

In 1955, Hunter was the first African-American artist to have a solo exhibition at the Delgado Museum (now the New Orleans Museum of Art). In February 1985, the museum hosted A New Orleans Salute to Clementine Hunter's Centennial, an exhibit in honor of her one-hundredth birthday. She achieved significant recognition during her lifetime, including an invitation to the White House from U.S. President Jimmy Carter and letters from both President Ronald Reagan and U.S. Senator J. Bennett Johnston, Jr.

Radcliffe College included Hunter in its Black Women Oral History Project, published in 1980. An interview with Hunter is part of the Black Women Oral History Project records, 1976–1997, housed at Harvard University, Radcliffe Institute, Schlesinger Library. In the Mildred H. Bailey Collection of Interviews at Northwestern State University of Louisiana, there are digitized interviews with Hunter and those closest to her.

Northwestern State University of Louisiana granted her an honorary Doctor of Fine Arts degree in 1986. The following year, Louisiana governor Edwin Edwards designated her as an honorary colonel, a state honor, and aide-de-camp.

A biography, Clementine Hunter: Cane River Artist (2012), was co-written by Tom Whitehead, a retired journalism professor who knew Hunter well.

Hunter has been the subject of biographies and artist studies, and inspired other works of art. In 2013, composer Robert Wilson presented a new opera about her: Zinnias: the Life of Clementine Hunter, at Montclair State University in New Jersey. Shinnerrie Jackson's one-woman musical Ain't I a Woman? honors the lives of four influential African American women, including Hunter.

Hunter's work can be found in numerous museums such as the Dallas Museum of Fine Art, the American Folk Art Museum, Minneapolis Institute of Arts, the Ogden Museum of Southern Art, the New Orleans Museum of Art, and the Louisiana State Museum.

Clementine Hunter's World is a 2017 documentary directed by noted Hunter scholar Art Shiver. The film celebrates Hunter's life and artwork through the lens of photographs, oral histories, and the newly resorted African House Murals. In addition to the film, the Smithsonian National Museum of African American History & Culture created an exhibition centering on Hunter called "Clementine Hunter: Life on Melrose Plantation." According to Smithsonian American Art curator Tuliza Fleming, the 22 works by Hunter is the largest collection by a single artist at the museum.

In 2019, Louisiana State Legislators passed a resolution that designated October 1 as Clementine Hunter Day. Loletta Jones-Wynder, the director of the Creole Heritage Center at Northwestern State University of Louisiana, created the resolution to honor Hunter's legacy and impact on the State of Louisiana.

== Forgeries ==
As Hunter became increasingly more famous over her lifetime, and began selling her painted works for more money, forged paintings started becoming a problem. Relatives of Clementine Hunter and Cammie Henry created forgeries, although very few. Although there were many Hunter fakes, William and Beryl Toye were the most prolific. In 1974, William J. Toye was charged with forging twenty-two Hunter paintings by the New Orleans police. Toye was able to pass these paintings off as Hunter originals because he recreated her distinctive signature, a backwards C and an H interlocking. William Toye's wife Beryl claimed that she purchased the paintings directly from Hunter at Melrose Plantation in the 1960s. Toye's case never went to trial, despite verification from Hunter herself that she had not painted the works. In 1996, Toye was accused of forging Matisse and Degas paintings, selling them to an auction house in Baton Rouge. Toye likely began forging Hunter paintings again in 1999, selling them or using them as a form of payment for doctor's bills or as collateral for a bank loan until the mid-2000s.

Toye sold many his fakes to New Orleans art and antiques dealer, Robert Lucky Jr. Lucky intentionally lied to his customers about the origins of fifty to one hundred Hunter paintings, reselling paintings that were returned as fakes. In 2000, Robert Lucky Jr. took payment for a Hunter painting that he never gave to the customer, and was charged and arrested. Some noted Hunter collectors caught on his scheme, such as Robert Ryan who returned some paintings bought from Lucky, demanding a refund. Shelby Gilley and Tom Whitehead, scholars, collectors, and friends of Hunter, also figured out that the bulk of Hunter fakes were coming from Lucky, leading them to open an investigation. Whitehead had bought a total of seventeen fake Clementine Hunter paintings from Lucky, spending a total of $55,000.

In 2005, Tom Whitehead, Shelby Gilley, and Jack Brittain hired Frank Preusser, an art authentication expert, to investigate these forgeries. Preusser analyzed the materials used in the paintings in question, compared to those sold by Lucky and determined that they were in fact inconsistent materials. The investigation uncovered paintings sold by William Toye, which were consistent with the fakes sold by Robert Lucky Jr., as Toye began selling the fakes directly to buyers in 2005. At that time, Beryl Toye was selling Hunter fakes for $3,500 a painting at a New Orleans auction house.

In 2009, Federal Bureau of Investigation Special Agent Randolph Deaton assembled a team of noted art authentication experts, to begin a formal investigation into the forgeries. The team included Joseph Barabe of McCrone Associates, a scientific analysis company and James Martin a forensic art expert of Orion Analytical. The group used several methods to analyze Hunter's original works to compare to the alleged forgeries, including an analysis of pigment cracks, paint age, painting style. However, one of the most important clues that a painting was a Hunter original were her fingerprints on the back of the oil paintings. Hunter did not use an easel, so the backs and borders of her paintings are smudged with paint, unlike the forgeries by Toye who used an easel to paint his fakes.

In September 2009, the FBI determined that William Toye was the one producing the forgeries and raided his home. Toye, who was accused of selling forged paintings three times over the course of four decades, pleaded guilty in federal court on June 6, 2011. The couple was charged with mail fraud and conspiracy to commit mail fraud. The price for Hunter paintings ranged between a few thousand dollars to $20,000, according to Tom Whitehead. Both William and Beryl Toye were sentenced to two years probation and a $426,393 fine for the cost of the fakes sold. Robert Lucky Jr. was charged with mail fraud and pled guilty, was sentenced to twenty-five months in prison and a $326,893 fine.

This investigation was crucial to protecting Hunter's legacy, as many of the fakes were shown in museums in private collections around the world. Additionally, very few FBI forgery cases investigate folk artists or outsider artists, and so this case helped to legitimize the value of self-taught artists.

== Selected works and collections ==
- Funeral Procession, ca. 1950, Savannah College of Art and Design
- Untitled, 1981, National Museum of Women in the Arts, Washington, D.C.
- Melrose Quilt, ca. 1960, Smithsonian American Art Museum, Washington, D.C.
- The Wash, ca. 1950s, Minneapolis Institute of Art, Minneapolis, MN
- Picking Cotton, ca. 1950s, Minneapolis Institute of Art, Minneapolis, MN
- The Annunciation and the Adoration of the Wise Men, 1957, Museum of Fine Arts, Boston, MA
- Cotton Pickin', 1948, American Folk Art Museum, New York, NY
- Saturday Night, 1965, American Folk Art Museum, New York, NY
- Baptism, 1950–1956, Abby Aldrich Rockefeller Folk Art Museum at Colonial Williamsburg, Williamsburg, VA
- Funeral, 1957, Muscarelle Museum of Art, Williamsburg, VA
- Sugar Cane Syrup Makin', 1979, Muscarelle Museum of Art, Williamsburg, VA
- Baptism, Late 1950s, Muscarelle Museum of Art, Williamsburg, VA
- Window Shade, 1950s, National Museum of African American History and Culture, Washington, D.C.
- ca. 1950s, Pérez Art Museum Miami, FL

== Studies and other related books ==
- Mildred Hart Bailey, Four Women of Cane River (1980)
- Shelby R. Gilley, Painting by Heart: The Life and Art of Clementine Hunter, Louisiana Folk Artist (2000), St. Emma Press
- Clementine Hunter, Clementine Hunter: A Sketchbook (2014), University of New Orleans Press. ISBN 978-1-60801-036-3
- Mary E. Lyons, Talking with Tebé (1998), Houghton Mifflin. ISBN 9780395720318
- François Mignon, illustrated by Clementine Hunter, Melrose Plantation Cookbook (1956), ASIN B000CS68QA
- Art Shiver, Tom Whitehead (editors), Clementine Hunter: The African House Murals (2005), Northwestern State University of Louisiana Press. ISBN 0-917898-24-9
- Art Shiver, Tom Whitehead (co-authors), Clementine Hunter Her Life and Art (2012), LSU Press. ISBN 978-0-8071-4878-5
- James Register, illustrated by Clementine Hunter, The Joyous Coast (1971), Mid-South Press, Shreveport, Louisiana
- James Wilson, Clementine Hunter: American Folk Artist (1990), Pelican Publishing Company

== See also ==
- Mose Tolliver
- Outsider art
- Folk Art
- Southern art
- Melrose Plantation
- Isle Brevelle
