= All the Stuff (And More)-Vol 1 =

Compilation album by The Huntingtons
- Released: 1998
- Recorded: 1996, 1998
- Genre: Punk rock
- Label: Burnt Toast Vinyl
- Producer: The Huntingtons; Scott Hatch; Kraynight Productions, Inc.

The Huntingtons chronology
High School Rock (1998)	All the Stuff (And More)-Vol 1 (1998)	Live: The Good, The Bad And The Ugly (1999)

Professional ratings
Review scores
Source	Rating
HM Magazine	(not rated)

All the Stuff (And More)-Vol 1 is an album by The Huntingtons released in 1998. It is a re-release of the band's debut disc, Sweet Sixteen, plus ten bonus tracks.

== Track listing ==
1. I Really Don't Like It
2. Mom's in Rehab
3. JW
4. She's Probably Over Me
5. Nicki Loves Her LSD
6. She's So Uncool
7. You Again
8. Martin's Pretty Girls
9. She's Comin' to the Show
10. Teenage Queen
11. She's Alright
12. Rock 'n' Roll Girl
13. Heidi Hates Me
14. Veronica
15. Drexel U
16. Heavy Metal's Alive in Baltimore
17. There She Goes
18. Secret Agent Johnny Bravo
19. Be My Baby
20. Looks That Kill
21. We're Not Gonna Take It
22. Do You Remember Rock 'n' Roll Radio
23. True to You
24. I'm So Stupid
25. Wimpy Drives Through Harlem
26. Talk Dirty to Me
27. Don't Leave Me in the Hospital
28. Pinhead
29. Drexel U (Live)

All songs written by Huntingtons, except track 19 by The Ronettes, track 20 by Mötley Crüe, track 21 by Twisted Sister, tracks 22 & 28 by Ramones, track 25 by The Queers and track 26 by Poison.

== Personnel ==
- Mikey Huntington – vocals, bass
- Cliffy Huntington – guitar, vocals
- Mikee Huntington – drums
