= Punk Sounds =

Compilation album by The Huntingtons
- Released: 2009
- Recorded: 1997, 1998, 1999, 2009
- Genre: Punk rock
- Label: Steinhaus Records, Knowhere Records
- Producer: Holt/Powell

The Huntingtons chronology
| Pull the Plug (2005) | Punk Sounds (2009) | 1-2-3-4!: The Complete Early Years Remastered (2010) |

Professional ratings
Review scores
| Source | Rating |
|---|---|
| Christian Music Zine | A link |

Punk Sounds is an album by the Huntingtons released in 2009, digitally by Steinhaus Records and on CD by Knowhere Records. The album contains B-sides, rarities, and two newly recorded tracks.

== Track listing ==
All songs written by the Huntingtons, except where noted.

1. "Too Late"
2. "Judy Jetson" (Darlington cover)
3. "When I Get Over You"
4. "I Don't Like It"
5. "Glue Sniff Death Shocker"
6. "Let's Go To Haddonfield"
7. "Not By You"
8. "Bombs On Baghdad"
9. "He Better Stay Away From My Girl"
10. "It's Always Christmas At My House"
11. "Babysitter" (Ramones cover)
12. "Don't Pick On Me"
13. "Why Should I Dream?"

=== iTunes (Expanded Edition) ===
1. "Too Late"
2. "Judy Jetson" (Darlington cover)
3. "When I Get Over You"
4. "Glue Sniff Death Shocker"
5. "Let's Go To Haddonfield"
6. "Bombs On Baghdad"
7. "He Better Stay Away From My Girl"
8. "You're Not Right"
9. "Babysitter" (Ramones cover)
10. "Don't Pick On Me"
11. "Why Should I Dream?"
12. "Do You Remember Rock'n'Roll Radio?" (Ramones cover)
13. "True To You"
14. "I'm So Stupid"
15. "Wimpy Drives Through Harlem" (The Queers cover)
16. "Don't Leave Me In The Hospital"
17. "Pinhead" (Ramones cover)
18. "I Just Want To Have Something To Do" (Ramones cover)

== Personnel ==
- Mikey Huntington – Vocals/Bass/Moog
- Cliffy Huntington – Guitar/Vocals/Moog
- Mikee Huntington – Drums/Tambourine
- Jonny Huntington – Guitar

=== Additional musicians ===
- Chad Prather – guitar on tracks 1 to 10 (1 to 8 iTunes expanded edition)
- Brad Ber – guitar on track 18 (iTunes expanded edition)
- Ryan Harris – juno on track 6 (5 iTunes expanded edition), additional vocals on track 9 (7 iTunes expanded edition)
- Jenny Holt – add'l vocals on track 9 (7 iTunes expanded edition)
- Adam Garbinski – add'l vocals on track 10
