= Nameless Lake =

Nameless Lake may refer to one of several lakes in Canada:

- Nameless Lake (Manitoulin District), Ontario
- Nameless Lake (Sudbury District), Ontario
