= Nameless Island (Alaska) =

Island in the United States of America

Coordinates: 56.785842°N 135.460050°W

Nameless Island is an island in Sitka, Alaska, United States.

Nameless Island was named in the year 1809 by a Russian navigator, and the present name is a translation from the Russian.
