= Live: The Good, the Bad and the Ugly =

The Good, The Bad And The Ugly

Live album by the Huntingtons
- Released: Jan 26, 1999
- Recorded: August 1, 1998
- Venues: Downstairs At Nick's, Newark
- Genre: Punk rock
- Label: Tooth & Nail Records
- Producers: Huntingtons and Nicky Rotundo, Brandon D. Ebel

The Huntingtons chronology
All The Stuff (And More)-Vol 1 (1998)	The Good, The Bad And The Ugly (1999)	File Under Ramones (1999)

Professional ratings
Review scores
Source	Rating
The Phantom Tollbooth	(not rated) link
HM	(not rated) link

The Good, The Bad And The Ugly is an album by the Huntingtons released in 1999 on Tooth & Nail Records.

== Track listing ==
All songs written by Huntingtons, except track 4 (The Queers) and track 13 (Ramones).

1. Pencil Neck
2. I Don't Wanna Sit Around With You
3. Dies Saugt
4. Wimpy Drives Through Harlem
5. We Don't Care
6. FFT
7. Aloha, It's You
8. Don't Beat Me Up
9. Goddess And The Geek
10. JW
11. Alison's The Bomb
12. She's A Brat
13. I Don't Want You
14. I'm No Good
15. All She Knows
16. Bubblegum Girl
17. Veronica
18. She's Alright
19. Jeannie Hates The Ramones
20. Drexel U
21. Crackhead
22. Rock 'N' Roll Girl

== Personnel ==
- Mikey Huntington – Vocals/Bass
- Cliffy Huntington – Guitar/Vocals
- Mikee Huntington – Drums
- A. J. Huntington – Guitar/Vocals
