= Nameless One (disambiguation) =

Nameless One is the protagonist of the role-playing video game Planescape: Torment.

Nameless One or The Nameless One may refer to:

- Nameless One (comics), several characters in comic books
- The Nameless One (novel), a 2014 novel by Paul Stewart and Chris Riddell
- "The Nameless One" (song), a 1993 single by Wendy James
- The Nameless One, arch-villain of the Pellinor fantasy series by Allison Croggon
