= No Name =

No Name or Noname may refer to:

== Geography ==
- No Name, Colorado
- No Name Key, an island among the Florida Keys
- No Name Tunnel, located near the same named town in Colorado

== Art, entertainment, and media ==
- No-Name (character), a fictional character in Marvel Comics
- No Name (novel), an 1862 novel by Wilkie Collins
- No\Name, a supernatural manga series written by Rafał Jaki
- Noname, a pen-name of Luis Senarens

=== Music ===
==== Artists ====
- Noname (rapper), American rapper, poet, and record producer
- No Name (Montenegrin band), a Montenegrin pop group
- No Name (Slovak band)

==== Albums ====
- No Name (album), a 2024 studio album by Jack White
- No Name (EP) a 2022 EP by Sidhu Moose Wala

==== Songs ====
- "No Name" (Ryan O'Shaughnessy song), 2012
- "No Name" (NF song), 2018
- "No Name Nos. 1-4", four songs by Elliott Smith from Roman Candle
- "No Name No. 5", a song by Elliott Smith from Either/Or

== Enterprises ==
- No Name (brand), a private-label brand owned by Loblaw Companies in Canada
- No Name (store), a store selling the aforementioned products

== Other uses ==
- Cocaine (drink), also marketed as "No Name", an energy drink
- No Name Restaurant

== See also ==
- Anonymous (disambiguation)
- Nameless (disambiguation)
- No Logo
- Nomen nescio, used to signify an anonymous or non-specific person
- Sin Nombre virus
- Untitled (disambiguation)
