= 33 EP =

33

EP by Esben and the Witch
- Released: 2009
- Recorded: 2009
- Genre: Gothic rock
- Label: Self-released
- Producers: Esben and the Witch

Esben and the Witch chronology
33 (2009)	Violet Cries (2011)

33 is the debut release by British gothic rock/indie rock band Esben and the Witch released in 2009 by themselves and features early recordings of Eumenides and future single Marching Song.

33 was recorded in Rachel Davies' bedroom; the band released the EP in 2009. It was available as a free download of their website and hand-made CD's were released at early shows and local record shops in Brighton.

== Track listing ==
All songs written by Esben and the Witch

No.	Title	Length
1.	"(Abstract)"	0:40
2.	"Eumenides"	5:43
3.	"Marching Song"	4:41
4.	"About This Peninsula"	4:33
5.	"Corridors"	9:01
