= Hexagons (EP) =

Hexagons EP

EP by Esben and the Witch
- Released: 7 November 2011
- Recorded: 2011
- Genre: Gothic rock, darkwave, ambient
- Length: 19:26
- Label: Matador records
- Producer: Esben and the Witch

Esben and the Witch chronology
Violet Cries (2011)	Hexagons EP (2011)	Wash the Sins Not Only the Face (2013)

Professional ratings
Review scores
Source	Rating
Consequence of Sound	3.5/5 stars
Drowned in Sound	(7/10)
Pitchfork	(5.2/10.0)

Hexagons is the second EP by British band Esben and the Witch released on Matador Records in 2011 as a digital download. Hexagons was quite well received Consequence of Sound said 'The one thing Esben and the Witch does remarkably well with Hexagons is establish a consistent, ghostly atmosphere right from the beginning and all the way through to the end with...', and Drowned in Sound said 'The Hexagons EP is undeniably portentous in both appearance and sound'.

== Track listing ==
All songs by Esben and the Witch

1. The Fall – 2:39
2. The Flight – 4:15
3. The Surge – 3:06
4. The Still – 3:20
5. The Cast – 4:06
6. The Thaw – 2:03

== Personnel ==
- Rachel Davies – vocals, bass
- Daniel Copeman – guitars, percussion
- Thomas Fisher – guitars
