= William J. Toye =

- Born: William James Toye; August 15, 1931; Baton Rouge, Louisiana
- Died: 2018 (aged 86–87)
- Other names: W. Geoffrey Toye, Ph.D
- Spouse(s): Beryl Spalding Toye, a.k.a. Beryl Ann Toye
- Parent(s): William Joseph Toye and Helen Toye
- Convictions: pleaded guilty (plea bargain to avoid prison)
- Criminal charges: conspiracy to commit mail fraud, art forgery, fraud
- Penalty: restitution, pending sentencing September 7, 2011

William James Toye (born August 15, 1931, died 2018) was an art forger in Baton Rouge, Louisiana. He painted in styles copied from Paul Gauguin, Pierre-Auguste Renoir and Alfred Sisley; Toye also copied the style of Claude Monet. Toye, his wife, and Robert E. Lucky, a New Orleans art dealer, were indicted on charges of conspiracy to commit mail fraud in 2010. On June 6, 2011, Toye pleaded guilty to conspiracy to sell counterfeit Clementine Hunter paintings, to misrepresenting the authenticity and origin of the paintings, and to painting the counterfeited Hunter artwork. William and Beryl Toye pleaded guilty to mail fraud charges in 2011 and were sentenced to two-years probation and ordered to pay $426,393 in restitution to the victims of the fraud. Robert Lucky was also convicted of mail fraud in January 2012 and was sentenced to 25 months in prison.

== "Strange story" ==
Toye's life story is called by Garden & Gun magazine, a "strange story" and The New York Times described the "cultish fascination" of the journalists and onlookers who followed Toye's case; Toye is described as having the demeanor of "a cultured professor emeritus". Those who have dealt with him have described him as "charming," "disarming," "eccentric," "totally nuts," and "a con artist." Toye said his profession was designing sets. He also claimed to be a conductor, composer, art collector and painter.

== Biographical details ==
Toye was from New Orleans, Louisiana, the son of William Joseph Toye (November 12, 1896 – April 1976) and Helen Toye (May 3, 1904 – January 1983). His father, a machinist, was born in Cork, Ireland and moved to the United States in March 1923. He worked at the Reed Unit Fan Company in New Orleans. Toye says his father was an abusive alcoholic.

Toye was a poor student and dropped out of high school. At the age of 17, he moved to New York City and worked at the Metropolitan Opera one summer.

In 1951, he moved back to New Orleans, where he went to work for engineering firms making architectural models. In his spare time, he studied art books and taught himself to paint. Later, in the 1960s, he worked as an artist.

Hunter met his wife, the former Beryl Spalding, from London, when she visited New Orleans in 1967.

In 1969, according to a newspaper article and police reports, the Toyes reported a burglary at their home, in which 50 paintings, some of local politicians and others of Storyville, a red-light district, were slashed or stolen. Toye told police that most of the destroyed work satirized local politicians, and that he was to exhibit the Storyville paintings in less than two weeks. Toye claims the burglary was a vendetta by politicians who did not like his portrayal of them. He and his wife say they filed an insurance claim for the damaged art and were paid about $25,000.

Toye claims to have invented an internal combustion turbine. A 1972 patent in the name of William J. Toye does exist at the United States Patent and Trademark Office.

Between 1967 and 2000, Toye and his wife set up several corporations in Louisiana, including two flood-control companies, a funding company, and two building companies.

== Art forgery ==
Toye was first suspected of producing forgeries of Clementine Hunter's work in the 1970s, not long after the 1969 date they claim his wife met Hunter and began buying her work. Though Toye counterfeited Hunter, he says he despises her paintings. “They're junk,” he says, “and really only good as dartboards.”

Toye paints and displays his artwork in his home. His paintings are executed in styles copied from Paul Gauguin, Pierre-Auguste Renoir and Alfred Sisley; Toye has also copied the style of Claude Monet. He and his wife claim to have work by Edgar Degas in a closet; a painting Toye asserted was by Reginald Marsh was kept on a pile of debris in the middle of a room in his home. Toye gave it to a journalist who interviewed him.

=== Legal troubles ===
Toye was arrested in 1974 on 22 counts of art forgery for painting and selling forged Hunter art. He was never prosecuted and Toye says he was framed. The charges were dropped.

Toye and his wife moved from New Orleans to Baton Rouge in 1994. In 1996, they consigned paintings they claimed were by Degas and Henri Matisse to a Baton Rouge auction house called the Louisiana Auction Exchange, which sold them. The auction's catalogue listed the paintings' owner as Dr. W. Geoffrey Toye, an alias Toye used in the 1990s, claiming his own name was too close to his father's. (The name Geoffrey was chosen after the English conductor and composer Geoffrey Toye, whom Toye says is a relative.)

Experts later identified numerous paintings in the auction, including Toye's, as forgeries. (Note: According to ArtValue.com, two paintings by Degas, Étude de danseuse and Après le bain were sold in Baton Rouge on September 7, 1996. (See Lot 60 and Lot 61.) Artfact.com lists Fleurs par la fenêtre by Matisse as having been sold by the Louisiana Auction Exchange in September 1996. (See Lot 58: Matisse, Henri (1869-1954, French).)) The auction was halted after New York art dealers questioned most of the other 126 paintings scheduled for auction and the Federal Bureau of Investigation (FBI) opened an inquiry. No charges were filed against Toye.

In September 2009, the FBI raided the Toyes home as part of their investigation of reports of forgery of Hunter's works. The FBI said the Toyes and Lucky “engaged in a conspiracy and a scheme to defraud several victims [in] Louisiana and in other states ... [and] knowingly sold forgeries as original, authentic works of art by Clementine Hunter.”

Toye and his wife were indicted for fraud in February 2010 in a conspiracy to sell counterfeit Hunter paintings with New Orleans antique dealer Robert E. Lucky, Jr. Prosecutors said Toye created phony bills of sale, and appraisals to establish the provenance he and his wife claimed, that she had bought the paintings from Hunter in the 1960s and 1970s. Some paintings, returned to Lucky by buyers who suspected they were fakes, were resold to other buyers.

Toye pleaded guilty in federal court to conspiracy to defraud collectors, to fraud in misrepresenting the painting's authenticity and origin, and to art forgery. By pleading guilty, Toye avoided serving a maximum of five years in prison. On his way out of the courthouse, Toye, 79, was photographed twice attacking a news photographer with his cane. On September 7, 2011, William and Beryl Toye pleaded guilty to mail fraud charges and were sentenced to two-years probation and ordered to pay $426,393 in restitution to the victims of the fraud. Robert Lucky was also convicted of mail fraud in January 2012 and was sentenced to 25 months in prison and a restitution of $326,893. An additional three-year supervised release period and 200 hours of community service is to follow Lucky's incarceration.

== See also ==
- Tony Tetro
