= Nameless, Texas =

Human settlement in Texas, United States of America

Coordinates: 30°31′29″N 097°55′37″W

Nameless is a populated place in Travis County, Texas, United States, with a small portion extending into Williamson County. The community is also referred to as Cross Creek and Fairview. Nameless is approximately 21 miles northwest of downtown Austin, and is a part of the Austin-Round Rock metropolitan area. It contains the Cherry Hollow and Travisso subdivisions and a large portion of Nameless Road, which extends into both Jonestown and Leander. Nameless School and Cemetery are part of the Travis County Parks system.

== History ==
A post office was established at Nameless in 1880, and remained in operation until it was discontinued in 1890. The locals ended up with the name "Nameless" after several applications containing other names were turned down by the post office. The post office is said to have been near today's Nameless School and Cemetery putting it at the intersection of Nameless' two key roads of the time, that to Liberty Hill (today's Nameless Road) and the road to Bagdad and Leander, later named CR 290 (mostly gone).

Nameless was first populated by Scotch-Irish and Germans settlers. When the township was being organized townspeople attempted to submit names, one of which was Fairview, to the post office for recognition as a town, which was customary in those days. The post office repeatedly denied the various names because other towns already had claimed them. In a fitting rebut the citizens replied in disgust, "Let the post office be nameless and be damned!" Thus the town of Nameless was born.

The town eventually became a part of the city of Leander, and the Nameless (Fairview) school closed in 1945.

Little is left of the old Nameless Community. The school was restored in 2008-2009 and is one of the best examples of a one room rural school in Travis County. The Gray house, likely built late 1870s or early 1880s, was moved adjacent to the school on Travis County property in 2024 and is being restored. Nameless Cemetery and Gray Family Cemetery are designated Texas Historical Cemeteries, and there are other small family cemeteries on private properties in the area. The rock house built by Madison Briggs in 1873, and a rock dam built by Avery Briggs on Cherry Creek are still standing located on private property. Unfortunately, much of the old community, including the Bagdad / Leander road, were east of Nameless Road which has been erased by development.

=== Republic of Texas Era ===
Much of Nameless is on the Jose Antonio Ybarbo Texas GLO survey. The survey was patented by Joseph W. Talbot July 3, 1861. Just north of this the Candelario Ybarbo survey too was patented by Talbot in 1861. The original documents archived with the Texas General Land Office (GLO) indicate both Ybarbos were in 1838 living in Nacogdoches, Texas and were as single men, "natives" of the Republic of Texas entitled to one third of a league of land. It is possible the two Ybarbos were somehow related to Antonio Gil Y'Barbo, the "Father of Nacogdoches", many descendants said to still be living in the Nacogdoches area into the 20th century. The family name is variously spelled as Ybarvo, y'Barbo, Y'Barbo, y Barvo, Ibarvo and Ebarbo. Although the Ybarbos were grantees and had the land surveyed, as they did not patent the land they would not have lived there.

=== Subdivision in 1871 ===
In 1871 the two Ybarbo surveys, Jose Antonio and Candelario, were subdivided into lots in preparation for sale. The plat that was produced provides an early look at the layout of what would be Nameless as a "subdivision". The subdivision lots unfortunately do not align with today's Travis County Appraisal District parcels making it difficult to locate lots on the current landscape without georeferencing and reference to the metes and bounds (land and water features) of lots.

=== Gray Family and the First Fairview School ===
The original Fairview School was on 1.5 acres of land donated to Travis County by the Gray family in 1877 about .4 miles east of today's Nameless School on what was then the road to Bagdad and Leander, Texas. A new Fairview School was built in 1909 on land deeded to Travis County by Bell and Rose Turner in 1906. The current school is called the Nameless School, according to the official name of the community post office (1880-1890). The land containing the Gray homestead, original school site and cemetery was subdivided in 2024 for a new residential development. The Gray House was relocated across Nameless Road to the Nameless School property (property of Travis County) for preservation.

Tennessee native Hubbard S. Gray (1815–1886) immigrated to Texas sometime in the 1850s. In the 1860 census, Gray is listed as a teacher in San Saba (San Saba County, Texas), living with the family of James and Berthena Crawford, including their daughter Eliza Jane (1822-1882). Hubbard and Eliza subsequently married. In 1874, they moved to Georgetown, Texas and later to land purchased from Elias Talbot on Cross Creek (Big Sandy Creek) in Travis County, Texas. The couple built a home, farmed, and raised livestock in the Fairview Community. In 1877, the Grays conveyed 1.5 acres to Travis County for Fairview’s first community school. In 1881 and 1882 Hubbard presided over elections at the Fairview School.

Eliza died July 12, 1882, and was buried on the family property in what is now known as the Gray Family Cemetery; the cemetery is designated a Historic Texas Cemetery. The cemetery is located approximately .5 miles southeast of today's Nameless School inside a pocket park of the Travisso - Leander subdivision. Eliza’s grave is topped with a locally carved limestone monument, surrounded by a late nineteenth century wrought iron fence. Potentially, two or more others are interred near Eliza: Hubbard is thought to be buried next to her in an unmarked grave, and an unnamed infant buried on top of her, in a shield-shaped crypt.

=== Gray House Architecture ===
As so little remains of the early Fairview Community preservation of the Gray's house was important. It was moved from its original location undergoing residential development, just east of today's Nameless Road, to Travis County property adjacent to today's Nameless School west of Nameless Road.

The Gray house is thought to have been built late 1870s or early 1880s after the parcels of land on which it sat were acquired in 1876, and from which 1.5 acres were donated to Travis County for a school.

The Gray house is a two room dog-trot, or dog-run, built with techniques bridging old log-cabin construction with those of the late nineteenth century. The house was built on hand hewn log piers and beams; some beams beneath the house are trunks of cedar trees approximately 16’ in length. The rest of the house was built from milled lumber. After the arrival of the railroad in Austin, Texas in 1871 milled lumber began to replace log construction; several planks in the dog-trot bear the stamp of the Van Patten Lumberyard that was located in downtown Austin east of Congress Avenue in the late 1800s near the rail freight depot and visible on the 1887 birds-eye map of Austin as feature #56. While the railroad had reached Austin by 1871 bringing in milled lumber, in 1877 the rail had not yet reached Georgetown, Leander or Liberty Hill so materials for the house would have been brought in by wagon from Austin.

The house is thought to have started as board and batten construction which features walls made of wide load-bearing vertical planks (there are no wall studs), with thin strips (battens) on the exterior covering the gaps between those planks. The battens were later removed and horizontal boards added to some sections of the house. Later the cedar shake roof was covered with tin as was some sides of the house.

Having been continuously lived in for at least 90 years the house underwent a number of modifications reflected in the nails and nail holes one finds in the construction: a mix of old cut nails (square nails) and more modern wire nails.

Many stones in the chimney are incised with a crisscross pattern thought to be the maker’s mark of Avery Briggs, a local stone mason. The same pattern is on Avery Briggs’ headstone, and also a limestone step originally part of the Nameless post office (1880-1890), now on display at the Nameless School. The same pattern appeared on the chimney of the John Jolly cabin (Jollyville, Texas). It is believed Avery and his father likely built the chimney for that cabin which dates to ca. 1866.

=== 1882-83 Texas state gazetteer and business directory ===
Nameless appears in the 1882-83 Texas state gazetteer and business directory. The population is given as 50, having one church and school and exporting cotton, cedar posts, and rails. Weekly mail is from Austin by horse with P.T. Stroud the postmaster and owner of the general store. Austin is listed as Nameless' "banking town", Georgetown its "express office" and Liberty Hill its "telegraph office". Rail connections listed are Georgetown Railroad and International–Great Northern Railroad in Georgetown, and Austin and Northwestern Railroad in Liberty Hill. Instructions are given to "Ship to Georgetown or Liberty Hill".

=== Nameless on USGS Map Surveyed 1885 ===
Perhaps the earliest map to include Nameless is the USGS survey of Williamson County, which included the northwest tip of Travis County. It was surveyed in 1885 during the period when the post office was still open. The survey shows the Nameless community center at the southeast intersection of two roads: the road north to Liberty Hill, Texas (today's Nameless Road) and the road east to Bagdad and Leander, Texas. That road would later be County Road (CR) 290 (not to be confused with US 290). Only small sections of CR 290 still exist; most of it has been destroyed by development. These roads were important as the routes to Georgetown, Texas, the county seat of Williamson County, and for reaching nearby Liberty Hill and Leander located on the Austin and Northwestern Railroad as well as the road from Austin to Burnet, Texas, county seat of Burnet County, Texas. While the CR 290 intersection with Nameless Road no longer exists it was across Nameless Road from today's Nameless School and was the original location of the Gray house.

=== Nameless School and Cemetery in 20th Century ===
R.W. Turner acquired land from P.T. Stroud in 1885 and Joseph Kauffman in 1886. From that property R.W.'s son, Bell Turner, deeded 1.5 acres to Travis County in 1906 for a "public free school and burial grounds and church purposes free to all denominations". In 1910 he then deeded another 1 acre for a total of 2.5 acres. This is the Travis County property on which today's Nameless School and Cemetery are located.

By 1906, before the property was deeded to Travis County, there were already about 17 burials in the cemetery. One of the earliest was that of Joseph Kauffman's two year old son, Rudolf Kauffman, who died in 1884 before the property was sold to R.W. Turner. What began as a burial on Kauffman's property may have been the start of Nameless Cemetery. Neither deed from 1885 or 1886 call out a cemetery plot(s) when R.W. Turner acquired the properties.

In 1936, the year of Texas' Centennial, a yearbook of rural public schools in Travis County was published named The Defender 1936. It included historical background, photos of administrators and students, and other photos of school life, athletics, clubs, and activities. Fairview (today's Nameless School) was included. At the time of publication the history of the original donation and location of 1.5 acres by the Gray family for the first public school had been forgotten. The article write-up for Fairview in The Defender 1936 says "The Fairview School was founded many years ago. The exact date is unknown." The Defender 1936 mistakenly states the first school was on the same tract as the current Nameless School. The 1906 deed does reflect a school at that location, but not the first. The 1898-1902 Travis County road map also shows a school, this before the property was deeded to Travis County. When and why the first school location deeded by the Grays was abandoned is not known. This earlier school building at the site of the current Nameless School is likely the source of confusion as to it having been the first school. The brief write-up in The Defender 1936 provides a good snap-shot of the building in 1936, the teacher and some of the students.

Nameless (Fairview) school closed in 1945 but remains the community's hub for gatherings today. Friends of Nameless School and Nameless/Fairview Cemetery Association work in coordination with Travis County to maintain the property. The property is listed as a Travis County Park.
