= A New Nature =

Studio album by Esben and the Witch
- Released: 31 August 2014
- Recorded: 2014
- Studio: Electrical Audio, Chicago, Illinois
- Genre: Alternative rock, post rock, post-punk
- Length: 54:28
- Label: Nostromo Records
- Producer: Steve Albini

Esben and the Witch chronology
Untitled EP (2014)	A New Nature (2014)

Singles from A New Nature
- 1. "Blood Teachings" Released: 23 June 2014

Professional ratings
Aggregate scores
Source	Rating
Metacritic	69/100
Review scores
Source	Rating
Drowned in Sound	8/10
NME	(7/10)
TLOBF	(8.5/10)
AllMusic	(8/10)

A New Nature is the third studio album by British alternative rock band Esben and the Witch, released on 1 September 2014 through their own label Nostromo Records.

== Background ==
In early 2014, the band left Matador Records and made their own label Nostromo Records. They pledged on PledgeMusic, which is an online Direct-to-Fan music platform that facilitates musicians reaching out to their fanbase to pre-sell, market, and distribute music projects including recordings, music videos, and concerts. On PledgeMusic they put pre-orders for their third album up, in which some include a hand-made bonus EP called And New Life Blossoms From the Ruins, and the money went towards the recording costs.

On April 7, 2014, they released an untitled split EP with Thought Forms, featuring two songs "No Dog" and "Butoh". On April 7, they performed "No Dog" and two new songs "Dig Your Fingers In" and "Those Dreadful Hammers" on BBC Radio 6. They began recording with Steve Albini in April 2014 at Electrical Audio studios in Chicago. Their song "Strangers In a Sunless Valley" was featured on the third Audioscope Music For A Good Home compilation in May.

They announced the album in June 2014, and have released the first single from the album, "Blood Teachings", on iTunes. The album was scheduled to be released on 1 September 2014.

== Music ==
The Guardian compared lead single "Blood Teachings" to early PJ Harvey. The Quietus said that ""Blood Teachings" is a good case in point, with its Swans-esque heaving repetition providing a soundbed over which Rachel Davies unfurls a mesmeric vocal, not dissimilar to former Albini collaborator PJ Harvey, building to a razing, fuzzed crescendo."

The band said of the album:

"We wanted to create a record that had a level of purity to it. To strip away the layers and loops and see what lay beneath. To keep things naked, unadorned and raw. The three of us, in a room, making noise. We looked to create a more primal record, full of human emotion and sonic intensity. Drawing on themes of endurance, strength, determination and self-actualisation. Themes that have always inspired us but perhaps, only now, a few years down the line, a few years of touring under our belts, we feel we have the confidence and maturity to explore and shout about."

== Track listing ==
LP
No.	Title	Length
1.	"Press Heavenwards!"	10:16
2.	"Those Dreadful Hammers"	3:34
3.	"Dig Your Fingers In"	4:39
4.	"No Dog"	6:01
5.	"The Jungle"	14:32
6.	"Wooden Star"	6:51
7.	"Blood Teachings"	7:54
8.	"Bathed In Light"	2:01

iTunes Cover
No.	Title	Length
1.	"Press Heavenwards!"	10:16
2.	"Dig Your Fingers In"	4:39
3.	"No Dog"	6:01
4.	"The Jungle"	14:32
5.	"Those Dreadful Hammers"	3:34
6.	"Wooden Star"	6:51
7.	"Blood Teachings"	7:54
8.	"Bathed In Light"	2:01

== Release history ==
Region	Date	Format	Label
United Kingdom	31 August 2014	DD	Nostromo Records
United Kingdom	1 September 2014	CD, LP	Nostromo Records
