= Untitled / Untitled (Black on Grey) =

Painting by Mark Rothko

One of the paintings

Untitled / Untitled (Black on Grey) are a group of paintings created by Mark Rothko now known as a series including works on canvas and paper produced before the artist's death by suicide.

The series has works which used both a combination of black and grey, or are monotone black, or with only a small quantity of color. The artists' works include an expression of color as more wholly dark, absent in previous works, from sometime during the 1950s.

Some of the serial of works were gifted by The Mark Rothko Foundation Incorporated to various city galleries in the United States, including: The Museum of Contemporary Art, Los Angeles, the Guggenheim and Museum of Modern Art of New York, the National Gallery of Art in Washington.

Altogether during 1970 the artist Rothko output three works of these $[$ ACCESSION 85.27$]$ is possessed by MoCA LA: Untitled the final in the grey-black serial painting. Although black with or without grey was the theme of Rothko's end works his penultimate painting Untitled included blue. The termination of Rothko's art and life in 1970 was death, his final product, red only. (Note: Untitled, Mark Rothko, born: Russia - now Latvia: 1903, an American, is, or, was, some time viewable: NGA (East Building Tower Level, 615-A))

== See also ==
Suicide of Mark Rothko
