= Untitled (Thought Forms and Esben and the Witch EP) =

EP by Esben and the Witch and Thought Forms
- Released: 7 April 2014
- Recorded: 2013–2014
- Genre: Alternative rock, dream pop, noise rock
- Label: Invada Records

Thought Forms albums chronology
Ghost Mountain (2013)	Untitled (2014)

Esben and the Witch chronology
Wash the Sins Not Only the Face (2013)	Untitled EP (2014)	A New Nature (2014)

Untitled (referred to in Spotify as Split LP) is a split EP by British rock bands Thought Forms and Esben and the Witch, which was released on 7 April 2014 through Invada Records. It was also released as a digital download and on 12" silver vinyl, limited to 500 copies. The EP contains four songs by Thought Forms and two songs by Esben and the Witch, and the songs "Sound of Violence" by Thought Forms and "No Dog" by Esben and the Witch were uploaded to SoundCloud.

== Track listings ==
A side (Thought Forms)

1. Your Bones
2. Sound of Violence
3. For the Moving Stars
4. Silver Kiss

B side (Esben and the Witch)

1. No Dog
2. Butoh
