= Untitled (Pope) =

Painting by Francis Bacon

- Artist: Francis Bacon
- Year: c. 1954
- Medium: Oil on canvas
- Subject: Pope Innocent X

Untitled (Pope) is a c. 1954 oil-on-canvas panel painting by Irish-born English artist Francis Bacon. It was one of his many works based on the depiction of Pope Innocent X, head of the Catholic Church from 1644 to 1655, in Diego Velázquez's Portrait of Innocent X (c. 1650).

Bacon was a harsh self-critic and destroyed a great many of his own paintings, many of which were created while he was drunk; Untitled (Pope) was long thought lost until it reemerged on the art market in 2016. It is closely related to another one of Bacon's works, the Study after Velázquez's Portrait of Pope Innocent X (1953) in the Des Moines Art Center, Iowa.

When asked why he was compelled to revisit Velázquez's portrait so often, Bacon said that he had nothing against popes, but merely sought "an excuse to use these colours, and you can't give ordinary clothes that purple colour without getting into a sort of false fauve manner". Bacon was in the 1950s coming to terms with the death of a cold, disciplinarian father, his early, illicit sexual encounters, and a very destructive sadomasochistic approach to sex, all of which informed this series of paintings.

Commenting on the freedom with brushwork in this example, Bacon biographer Michael Peppiatt said that Bacon was a gambler by nature and habit, and would often return to paintings late at night, to attack them with a brush to see what would happen. If he disliked the results he would simply have them destroyed. A number of people around Bacon were aware of these traits, and instead hid away the paintings, which have been reemerging since the mid-1990s.

== See also ==
- List of paintings by Francis Bacon

== Sources ==
- Peppiatt, Michael. Anatomy of an Enigma. London: Westview Press, 1996. ISBN 0-8133-3520-5
