= Untitled (1981 painting by Clementine Hunter) =

1981 painting by Clementine Hunter

- Artist: Clementine Hunter
- Year: 1981
- Medium: Oil and collage on canvas board
- Location: National Museum of Women in the Arts, Washington, D.C.

Untitled is a 1981 painting by Clementine Hunter. It is in the collection of the National Museum of Women in the Arts (NMWA) in Washington, D.C. in the United States. It is a rare self-portrait by an artist who usually depicted everyday life on the plantations that she lived on in Louisiana.

== Description ==
Untitled is a self-portrait by Hunter. Keeping with many of her paintings, the painting is a landscape work, with a cloudy sky on the top and a tree and flowers growing from the bottom. An African American woman stands in the middle with a blue dress and her hands outstretched with a bouquet of roses. She faces a cut out, from an exhibition brochure from 1974, that features a photograph of the artist. Hunter's signature is on the lower proper left.

== History ==
Hunter created this work in 1981. It was gifted to the National Museum of Women in the Arts by Evelyn M. Shambaugh.

== Interpretation ==
Untitled is a rare self-portrait by Hunter. Curators at the NMWA interpret the painted woman in the artwork as showing respect to the artist for the success she has gained.
