= Untitled (Rosati) =

Public art work by James Rosati

Coordinates: 43°10′36.6″N 87°56′15.4″W

- Artist: James Rosati
- Year: 1976
- Type: steel
- Dimensions: 200 cm (79 in)
- Location: Lynden Sculpture Garden; Milwaukee, Wisconsin
- Owner: Bradley Family Foundation

Untitled is a public art work by American abstract artist James Rosati located at the Lynden Sculpture Garden near Milwaukee, Wisconsin. The sculpture is an abstract form made of Corten steel; it is installed on the lawn.
