= Self-titled Album (The Huntingtons album) =

Self-Titled Album

Studio album by The Huntingtons
- Released: 2003
- Recorded: July to August 2003
- Studio: Clay Creek Recording
- Genre: Pop punk, alternative rock
- Label: Fast Music
- Producer: Nick Rotundo, the Huntingtons

The Huntingtons chronology
The Soothing Sounds of... (2003)	Self-Titled Album (2003)	Growing Up Is No Fun: The Standards '95–'05 (2005)

Professional ratings
Review scores
Source	Rating
AllMusic	not rated

Self-titled Album is an album by the Huntingtons released in 2003 on the Fast Music label.

== Track listing ==
1. "Cut Me Loose"
2. "3 Chord Baby"
3. "I've Been Waiting"
4. "I Just Want to Feel Alive"
5. "Pittsburgh"
6. "Kiss Your World Goodbye"
7. "Maybe It's You"
8. "Untitled 2"
9. "Postcard"
10. "What I'm Doing Wrong"
11. "The Sound (Of Inevitability)"

All songs written by Huntingtons.

== Personnel ==
- Rick Wise – drums, percussion, programming
- Josh Blackway – electric guitar, acoustic guitar
- Tom Giachero – electric guitar
- Mike Holt – vocals, bass guitar, electric guitar

Additional musicians

- Stephen Mark Sarro – additional vocals
- Gina Lardani – additional vocals on track 4, piano on track 11
- Jenn Holt – additional vocals on track 4
