= Marching Song (Esben and the Witch song) =

2010 single by Esben and the Witch

Single by Esben and the Witch.

from the album Violet Cries
- B-side: "Souvenirs"/"Done because we are too menny"
- Released: 11 October 2010
- Recorded: October 2010
- Genre: Alternative rock, post-rock, gothic rock
- Length: 3:49
- Label: Matador
- Songwriter: Esben and the witch
- Producer: Esben and the witch

Esben and the Witch. singles chronology
"Lucia, at the Precipice" (2010)	"Marching Song" (2010)	"Chorea" (2011)

"Marching Song" is a song by British gothic rock band Esben and the Witch as the first single from their debut studio album Violet Cries, released on a limited number of 300 on 12" vinyl.

== Reception ==
Drowned in sound said "It has to be said, that with Marching Song, Esben And The Witch don't quite do enough to shatter any cynicism around their assumed acclaim. But they'll keep people interested, and at this stage, that'll do" and the line of best fit said "The fact that not everything can be clearly deciphered straight away is one of the most appealing factors here though. Esben, alongside the likes of The XX and Zola Jesus are forging a path to inject a little mystique back into pop music, drawing on the despair and theatrics of gothic culture to create songs which are stirring, atmospheric and adventurous whilst still maintaining an accessible edge".

== Music video ==
A video was made for "Marching Song". It features head-shots of the band members depicting them being gradually beaten up. Rachel said about the idea for the video “It was an idea I had quite a while ago, and something we spoke about and developed between the three of us. Confrontation, strength, resilience: all emotions we wanted to convey simply and effectively, and we’re really happy with the way it turned out”. It was directed by David Procter and Peter King.

== Track listing ==
All songs written by Esben and the Witch

A

1. Marching Song - 3:49
2. Souvenirs - 3:23

B

1. Done because we are too menny - 9:05

== Personnel ==
- Rachel Davies – lead vocals, bass, percussion
- Thomas Fisher – guitar, keyboards, percussion
- Daniel Copeman – guitar, keyboards, percussion

== Charts ==
Chart (2010)	Peak position
Hot Singles Sales	50
