= Esben and the Witch (band) =

British rock band

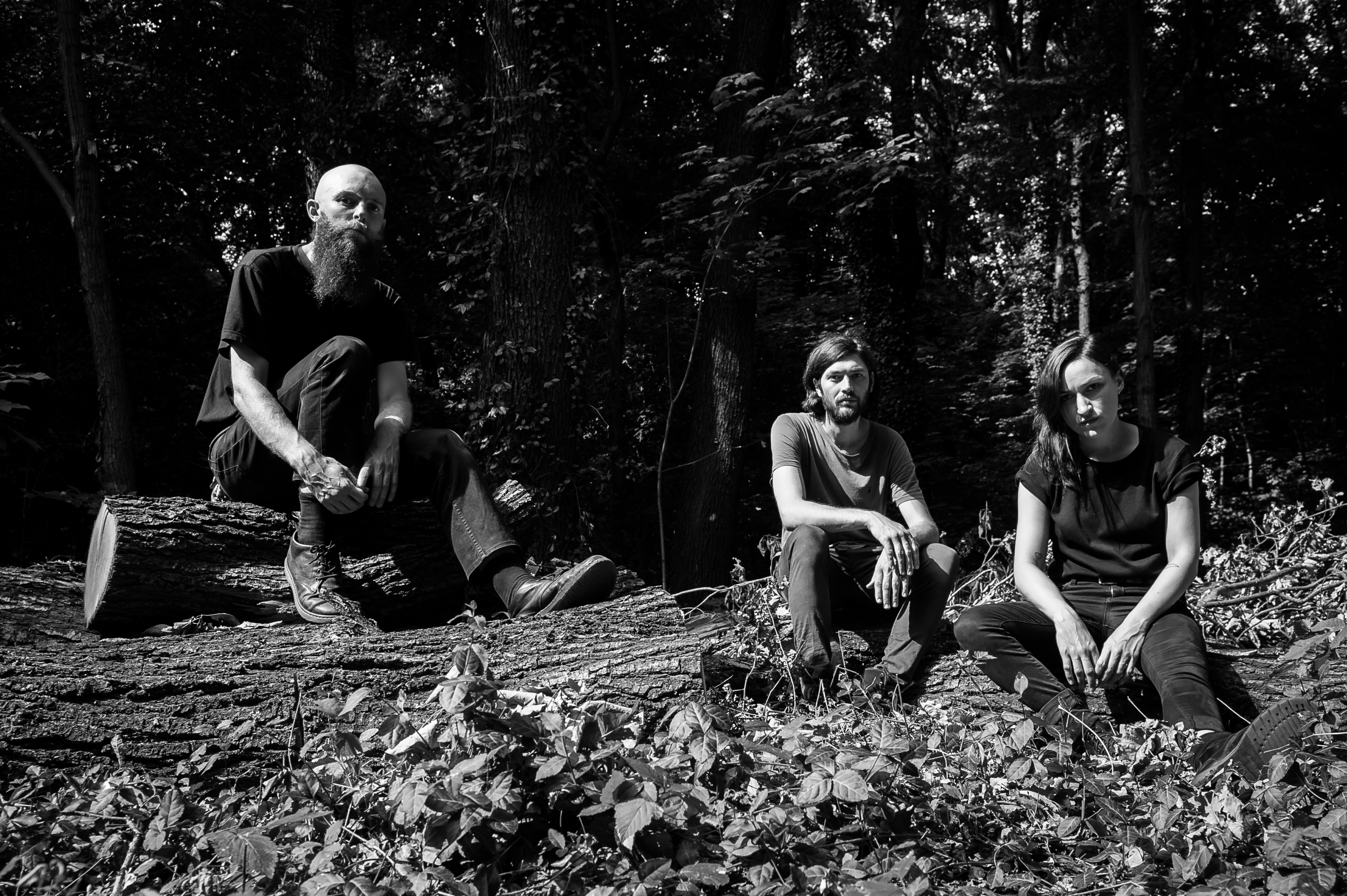
- Photograph by William van der Voort

Background information
- Origin: Brighton, England
- Genres: Post-rock, alternative rock, gothic rock, indie rock, darkwave
- Years active: 2008–present
- Labels: Nostromo Records, Season of Mist Matador
- Members: Rachel Davies; Daniel Copeman; Thomas Fisher
- Website: esbenandthewitch.co.uk

Esben and the Witch are a British three piece rock band formed in Brighton in 2008. consisting of Rachel Davies (vocals, bass), Thomas Fisher (guitar), and Daniel Copeman (drums, electronics – formerly guitar). Their name comes from the Danish fairytale, "Esben and the Witch".

After a self-released 33 EP in 2009 and a limited seven-inch single "Lucia, at the Precipice" in February 2010, the band signed with Matador Records. The band's debut single for the label, "Marching Song", was released in October 2010, followed by their debut album Violet Cries in January 2011. The band's second album, Wash the Sins Not Only the Face, was released in January 2013. In June 2014 the band announced their third album A New Nature, the first to be released on their own Nostromo Records label. The band signed to independent French metal label, Season of Mist, in July 2016.

== History ==
=== Formation and Violet Cries (2008–2011) ===
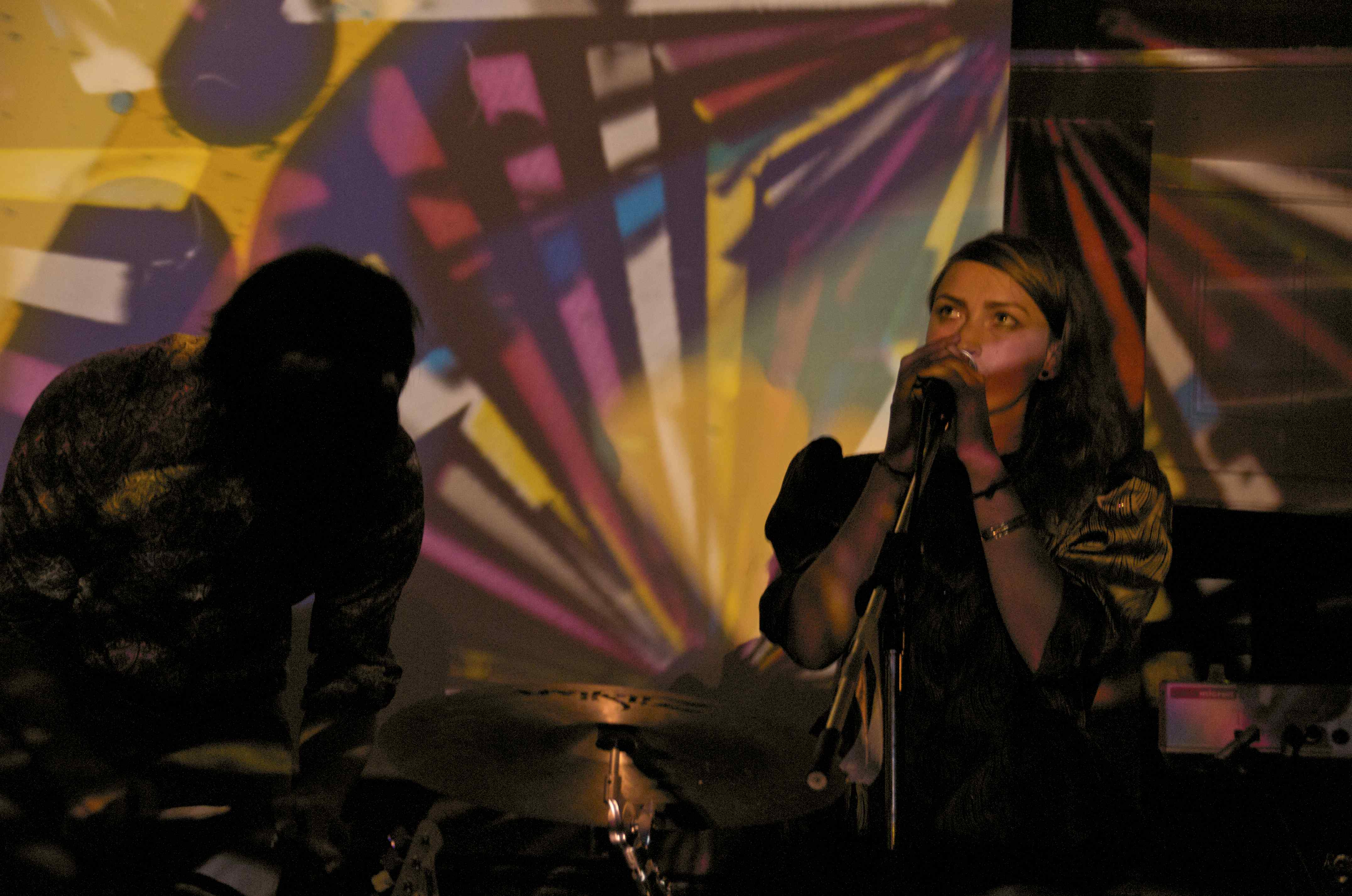
Rachel Davies and Daniel Copeman performing at the Psychedelic Double Bubble, Brighton 2009

Esben and the Witch formed in 2008 when Daniel Copeman moved from Southampton to Brighton and met Thomas Fisher and they began making some music, eventually they decided they wanted a vocalist and held auditions which were unsuccessful. Thomas Fisher bumped into his old friend Rachel Davies, who had just graduated from Brighton University, and asked her if she would like to join the group and she accepted. In 2009 the band recorded their first EP, 33, and released it the same year, the EP gathered attention around the band and in 2010 they contributed their song "Skeleton Swoon" on volume 3 of the Dance to the Radio label's 4 x 12". Shortly after that they released their first official single Lucia, at the Precipice in February on limited edition seven-inch vinyl on the Too Pure singles club, an accompanying video was also released.

In 2010, the band signed to Matador Records and began work on their debut album, Violet Cries, in March 2010. They released their second single "Marching Song" in October, the single went at number 50 in the Billboard Hot Singles Sales. On 31 January they released Violet Cries shortly after the band's shortlisting in the BBC’s Sound of 2011 poll. The album was critically acclaimed and went at number 13 in the UK Indie Chart, Allmusic awarded it three and a half stars out of five, calling it "a promising and often captivating debut". NME said it was "gothic but not goth" giving it 8/10. After the release of the album they went on to release two more singles off the album, "Warpath" and "Chorea". In November 2011 they released the Hexagons EP as a digital download.

=== Wash the Sins Not Only the Face (2012–2013) ===
In 2012 the band began work on writing the new material for the album, unlike their debut album, Violet Cries (2011), the lyrics were written solely by Davies. The writing for the album was done while they were isolated in a cottage in East Sussex. The songs were first recorded live in the studio, Davies said that they wanted the album to have a "warmer" sound. They co-produced the album with Tom Morris, saying that "It was great to have someone else in the process, actually, which is something which – again – we hadn’t done".

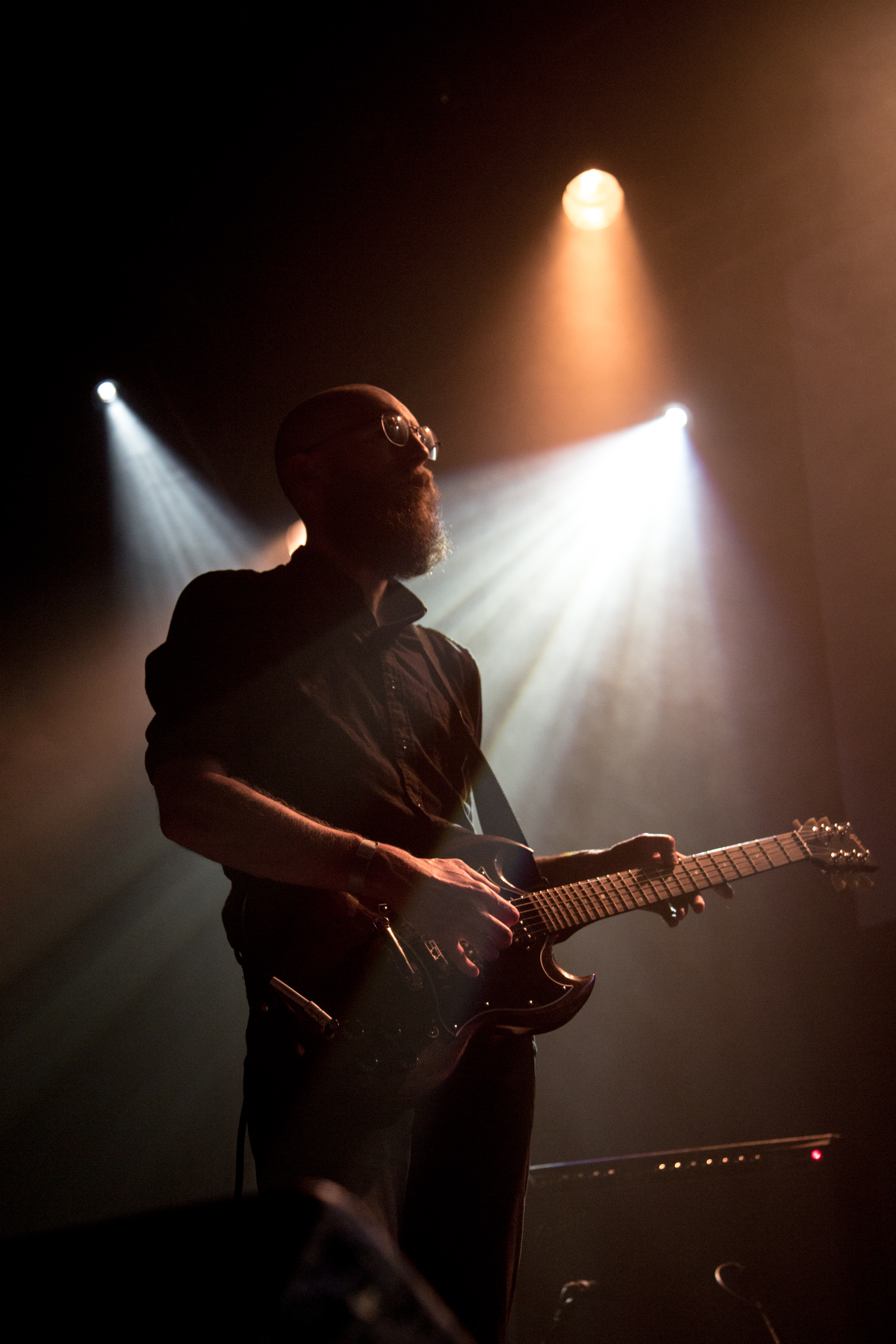
Thomas Fisher at Melting Sounds Festival in Essen, Germany

In October they announced Wash the Sins Not Only the Face along with promotional single "Deathwaltz". They felt this was a good bridge between their first album to their second, later in December 2012 an accompanying video was released directed by Sim Warren. It was released on 21 January 2013 on CD, digital download and a deluxe LP version of the album was also released, which features the LP and CD version of the album and a bonus 7". The lyrics seems to be a semi-concept album as it is meant to be a journey and each song represents part of that journey. A lot of the lyrics were inspired by books and poems such as Despair by Vladimir Nabokov and The Road Not Taken by Robert Frost. The album was critically acclaimed, NME said "Call it highbrow, call it highfalutin, but with Wash The Sins…, Esben are carving hulking tablets of stone boasting that intellect is nothing to be scared of. No amount of splashing can scrub that out" giving it 7/10, and Clash said "...everything about this album is bigger than what has gone before and reveals an energised band with a real belief in what they’re doing. Quite right too". In July, they performed a live score for the film La Antena at the East End Film Festival. Wash The Sins... proved to be the band's final album with Matador, announcing their departure alongside their PledgeMusic campaign in February 2014.

== Use of music in popular culture ==
The band's music has been used in a variety of TV shows across the world, most notably "Marching Song" on Beavis and Butt-head, Ringer and in a number of show trailers. "Despair", "When That Head Splits", "Shimmering" and "Smashed To Pieces In The Still of the Night" have been used in Waterloo Road during series 8 and "Smashed to Pieces..." in the trailer for Series 7 of Skins.

== Musical style ==
The band's music has been described as "electronic dubstep soundscapes" and "Radiohead without the mithering, goth stripped of unnecessary melodrama", with Davies' vocals compared to Siouxsie Sioux and PJ Harvey. The Quietus called it "perfect gothic pop". The band themselves once described their music as "nightmare pop" around the release of the '33' but have attempted to avoid genre classification since. With A New Nature, Rachel Davies alluded to wanting to have a less electronic feel with further emphasis on the rock element of the band.

== Discography ==
- Violet Cries (2011)
- Wash the Sins Not Only the Face (2013)
- A New Nature (2014)
- Older Terrors (2016)
- Nowhere (2018)
- Hold Sacred (2023)
