= Violet Cries =

Studio album by Esben and the Witch
- Released: 31 January 2011
- Recorded: March–July 2010
- Genres: Post-rock, dream pop
- Length: 43:44
- Label: Matador Records
- Producers: Daniel Copeman, Esben and the Witch

Esben and the Witch chronology
33 EP (2009)	Violet Cries (2011)	Hexagons EP (2011)

Singles from Violet Cries
- 1. "Marching Song" Released: October 11, 2010; 2. "Warpath" Released: October 25, 2010; 3. "Chorea" Released: April 16, 2011

Violet Cries is the debut studio album by British alternative rock band Esben and the Witch. The album was released on 31 January 2011 through Matador. The album came shortly after the band's shortlisting in the BBC’s Sound of 2011 poll. A UK tour accompanied the album as well.

The album spawned three singles including "Marching Song" which was moderately popular and is usually associated with the band. The album reached number 13 in the UK Indie Chart and has been well critically acclaimed. BBC Music described as the album's sound as a “darker-hued cousin of The xx rather than some pastiche of The Cure or Sisters of Mercy", while Pitchfork described singer Rachel Davies as “Florence’s evil sister”. NME referred to Davies' voice: "[Her] tremulous yet throaty voice possesses a howl that brings heat to [her] frosty surroundings". Allmusic stated that Violet Cries was a "captivating debut from a band with a bold sound".

== Background ==
Esben and the Witch formed in 2008 when Daniel Copeman moved from Southampton to Brighton and met Thomas Fisher. The duo began making music and eventually they decided they wanted a vocalist and held auditions. With the auditions being unsuccessful, they recruited Davies as vocalist when Fisher bumped into her and asked if she would like to join.

In 2009, the band released their debut EP by themselves titled 33. This gained them some attention and they released as single, "Lucia, at the Precipice", on Too Pure. The band signed to Matador Records in 2010, being the first British band signed to the label in over 6 years, and began work on their debut album.

== Packaging ==
The album cover features trees surrounded by water. Huge icicles can be seen hanging from the trees, this comes from people driving through the water and splashing it onto the trees. Fisher said that "The image, as is abundantly clear to anyone who ever lays eyes on it, has been run through Photoshop. This procedure is one we often find ourselves undertaking. Rachel generally oversees it which tends to entail her creating many, many versions of an image, each one almost imperceivably different to the next. Daniel and I then trawl through them looking for the one we feel works the best. We edited the colours of the image to create what we felt was an otherworldly feel, we find it interesting how some swift sleight of some technological hand can transform a picture and its character. In this case we felt only some minor adjustments were needed as we deemed the original image so striking", the same photograph was used for the back of the album as well. The inserts for the album feature lyrics and a picture linked to each song, photographed by Jonathan Hyde.

== Release ==
In September and October 2010 the band toured the US supporting Foals. To promote the album, the band released the "Marching Song" single backed with "Souvenirs" and "Done because we are too menny". Shortly after, the album's second single, "Warpath", was released. Starting November, the band toured the UK before the album's release.

Violet Cries was released on January 31, 2011 in the UK and Europe, then on February 8, 2011 in the US. The album peaked at number 13 in the UK Indie Chart. Later on they released the third and final single off the album, "Chorea", was released for Record Store Day. A short film was made in support of the single directed by their friend Jonathan Hyde and Abi Toll, the video appears to deal with the concept of Chorea as in the film the cast imitate the effects of Chorea. The band then toured the East Coast of the US in March.

== Reception ==
Professional ratings
Aggregate scores
Source	Rating
Metacritic	(64/100)
Review scores
Source	Rating
Allmusic	3.5/5 stars
Clash	(8/10)
Drowned in Sound	(9/10)
The Guardian	3/5 stars
The Fly	4/5 stars
BBC	8/10 stars
NME	(8/10)
Pitchfork Media	(6.6/10)
Consequence of Sound	(3.5/5)

Violet Cries has received mostly positive reviews from music critics. At Metacritic, which assigns a normalized rating out of 100 to reviews from mainstream critics, the album received an average score of 64, based on 26 reviews. Allmusic's Heather Phares said that "Nearly all of their songs come swooping in on chilly, swirling guitars and Rachel Davies' feverish vocals" and later stated "While there are a few moments where Violet Cries' potent atmosphere turns meandering and atonal, this is still a promising and often captivating debut from a band with a bold sound." David Edwards of Drowned in Sound said that "Immersing your mind into the depths of Violet Cries, the debut album from Esben and the Witch is to experience transportation to an alternate reality. Whether you happen to be listening at home, in the car on a frozen morning or caught between twin headphones on a bustling commute, you are suddenly relocated to a bleak and blasted heath; smoke and mist rushing by your ears as the sun disappears behind the line of the horizon and the spirits begin to stir" later noting that "Violet Cries is a record of exceptional class and calibre, a band doing things in a comprehensively new way: blending poetry, sounds and obscure textures together into an intoxicating draught." Ben Hewitt of NME commented "No doubt there’ll be some impatient souls who clamour for more tunes with immediate impact (especially since singles ‘Skeleton Swoon’ and ‘Lucia, At The Precipice’ were deemed superfluous), but demanding such fare from ‘Violet Cries’ would be like asking Gordon Ramsay to serve you up some beans on toast: there’s a far richer and more refined set of treats on display here than any of the band’s contemporaries could rustle up. Esben And The Witch, then: gothic, not goth, and making the latter seem like just another four-letter word" giving it 8 out of 10.

In a review for BBC Music John Doran described the album's sound as a “darker-hued cousin of The xx rather than some pastiche of The Cure or Sisters of Mercy", commenting that "From the dream-like artwork to the sepulchral production, everything about this album says Serious with a capital S and Quality with a capital Q" saying it is "...an album that gives up its charms slowly, but its painstaking attention to detail, dark shadows and languid depths will see it become an essential companion for many sombre souls in 2011 and beyond." Pitchfork had a mixed review of the album, Jayson Greene commented on the song writing saying "Violet Cries gets so many of these little details right that it's perplexing that it isn't more compelling. But they haven't quite figured out vivid songwriting yet. The songs are frustratingly drowsy, a series of interludes with the surrounding meat seemingly excised," later noting that "Violet Cries never delivers on its promise, though-- in order to deliver, goth needs to be pitched at some sort of extreme, to risk ridiculousness through abandon, and the members of Esben and the Witch are too tasteful and careful to take the plunge." The Guardian's Caroline Sullivan said that "Despite a tendency to drift formlessly, there's true beauty in some of their desolate soundscapes, which get eerier as the album crawls along. When it finishes, with the country-and-western-accented Swans, it takes a good few minutes to detach yourself from its grip," giving it three stars out of five. Clash concluded their short review of Violet Cries saying it was "Layered, expansive and driven by the kind of shadowy dynamics Portishead might call their own, Esben And The Witch display an effortless aptitude for creating a sense of drama and intrigue. Like following a serial killer’s trail of devastation, you’re gripped until the end, no matter how grisly the conclusion. Bewitching."

== Track listing ==
All songs written by Esben and the Witch

Regular release

1. "Argyria" – 5:47
2. "Marching Song" – 3:54
3. "Marine Fields Glow" – 2:58
4. "Light Streams" – 5:47
5. "Hexagons IV" – 4:44
6. "Chorea" – 4:25
7. "Warpath" – 4:28
8. "Battlecry/Mimicry" – 1:20
9. "Eumenides" – 6:12
10. "Swans" – 4:36

Bonus disc

1. "Lucia, at the Precipice" – 5:43
2. "They Use Smiles to Bury You" – 2:51
3. "Skeleton Swoon" – 4:51
4. "Lucia, at the Precipice (65daysofstatic remix) – 6:19

== Personnel ==
Taken from the album's liner notes

Esben and the Witch

- Rachel Davies – lead vocals, bass, percussion
- Thomas Fisher – guitar, keyboards, percussion
- Daniel Copeman – guitar, keyboards, programming, production, percussion

Production and design

- Rodaidh McDonald – mixing
- Matthew Twaites – engineering
- Jonathan Hyde, Esben and the Witch + L.O. Michael Welland – photography, art direction, design
- Philip Laslett – Layout
- Nick Zampiello & Rob Gonella at New Alliance East – Mastering
- Mattitude/Beggars Music - Publishing

== Charts ==
=== Album ===
Chart (2011)	Peak position
UK Albums Chart	116
UK Indie Chart	13
UK Indie Breakers Chart	3

=== Singles ===
Chart (2010)	Peak position
Hot Singles Sales	50

== Release history ==
Region	Date	Distributing Label
UK/Europe	January 31, 2011	Matador Records
US	February 8, 2011	Matador Records
Japan	March 1, 2011	Matador Records
