= Equals Pi =

1982 painting by Jean-Michel Basquiat

- Artist: Jean-Michel Basquiat
- Year: 1982
- Medium: Acrylic and oilstick on canvas
- Movement: Neo-expressionism
- Dimensions: 182.9 cm × 182.9 cm (72.0 in × 72.0 in)
- Owner: Tiffany & Co.

Equals Pi is a painting created by American artist Jean-Michel Basquiat in 1982. The painting was published in GQ magazine in 1983 and W magazine in 2018.

== History ==
Equals Pi was executed by Jean-Michel Basquiat in 1982, which is considered his most coveted year. The robin egg blue painting contains Basquiat's signature crown motif and a head alongside his characteristic scrawled text with phrases such as "AMORITE," "TEN YEN" and "DUNCE." The title refers to the mathematical equations incorporated on the right side of the work. The cone refers to the pointed dunce caps depicted in the work.

The painting was acquired in 1982 by Anne Dayton, the advertising manager of Artforum magazine. She purchased it for $7,000 from Basquiat's exhibition at the Fun Gallery in the East Village. At the time the painting was called Still Pi. However, when the work appeared in the March 1983 issue of GQ magazine, it was titled Knowledge of the Cone, which is written on the top of the painting.

According to reports in August 2021, the luxury jewelry brand Tiffany & Co. had recently acquired the painting privately from the Sabbadini family, for a price in the range of $15 million to $20 million. The painting, which is largely in the brand's signature blue color, is displayed in the Tiffany & Co. Landmark store on Fifth Avenue in New York City. Although initial reports claimed that the painting had never been seen before, it had previously been offered at auction twice and had appeared in magazines. The work was first offered at a Sotheby's sale in London in June 1990, where it went unsold. In December 1996, the Sabbadinis, a Milan-based clan behind the eponymous jewelry house, purchased it at a Sotheby's London auction for $253,000. Mother and daughter Stefania and Micól Sabbadini posed in front of the painting in their living room for a 2018 feature in W magazine.

== Use in Tiffany & Co. campaign ==
In 2021, luxury jewelry company Tiffany & Co. partnered with American singer Beyoncé and rapper Jay-Z to promote the company's "About Love" campaign. In the campaign, Jay-Z is seen wearing his hair much like Basquiat posing in front of Equals Pi. The campaign was used to showcase the company's new art purchase, as the painting features a color close to the company's signature Tiffany Blue.

The campaign was met with criticism from the artist's former friends and colleagues. Stephen Torton, a former assistant of Basquiat's, posted a statement on Instagram saying, "I designed and built stretchers, painted backgrounds, glued drawings down on canvas, chauffeured, traveled extensively, spoke freely about many topics and worked endless hours side by side in silence. The idea that this blue background, which I mixed and applied was in any way related to Tiffany Blue is so absurd that at first I chose not to comment. But this very perverse appropriation of the artist's inspiration is too much."

Furthermore, a curator of Basquiat's work has stated that if the use of this shade of blue was in reference to Tiffany, it would have been intended as criticism rather than an homage or as something to be commercialized by the company.

== See also ==
- List of paintings by Jean-Michel Basquiat
- 1982 in art
