= Basquiat: Rage to Riches =

- Directed by: David Shulman
- Produced by: David Shulman
- Starring: Jean-Michel Basquiat
- Edited by: Lennaart Van Oldenborgh
- Release date: October 7, 2017 (UK); September 14, 2018 (US)
- Running time: 90 minutes
- Language: English

Basquiat: Rage to Riches is a documentary film about artist Jean-Michel Basquiat that premiered on BBC Two in October 2017. It was produced and directed by David Shulman. The film won the Huw Wheldon Award for Specialist Factual at the 2018 British Academy Television Awards.

The documentary aired in the U.S. on PBS as part of its American Masters series in September 2018. It won the New York Press Club Award for Feature Video on TV, and received a nomination for Outstanding Independent Documentary at the 2019 Black Reel Awards.

== Synopsis ==
Nearly 30 years after his premature death, one of Jean-Michel Basquiat's Skull paintings from 1982 sold at Sotheby's for the record-breaking sum of $110 million. Basquiat: Rage to Riches details how the self-taught Brooklyn-born artist rose to success in the international art marketplace. In addition to interviews with Basquiat's art dealers and associates, the film features exclusive interviews with his two sisters, Lisane Basquiat and Jeanine Basquiat, who have never before spoken about their brother or his art for a documentary.

== Cast ==
- Jean-Michel Basquiat (archive footage)
- Lisane Basquiat
- Jeanine Basquiat
- Bruno Bischofberger
- Mary Boone
- Bob Colacello
- Tamra Davis
- Brett De Palma
- Fab 5 Freddy
- Larry Gagosian
- Michael Holman
- Suzanne Mallouk
- Cathleen McGuigan
- Annina Nosei
- Paige Powell
- Kenny Scharf
- Troy Stevenson-House (young Basquiat)
- Robert Storr
- Jennifer Vonholstein
