= El Gran Espectaculo (The Nile) =

1983 painting by Jean-Michel Basquiat

- Untitled (History of Black People)
- Artist: Jean-Michel Basquiat
- Year: 1983
- Medium: Acrylic and oilstick on panel
- Movement: Neo-expressionism
- Dimensions: 172.5 cm × 358 cm (67.9 in × 141 in)
- Owner: Private Collection

El Gran Espectaculo (The Nile) also known as Untitled (History of the Black People), is a painting created by American artist Jean-Michel Basquiat in 1983. The artwork references Ancient Egypt and Southern United States culture to critique Western society's understanding of history and its forgetfulness towards slavery.

The painting was sold at Christie's for $67.1 million in May 2023. It was previously owned by fashion designer Valentino Garavani.

== Analysis ==
History of the Black People is made up of three canvases attached to hinged wooden board. According to Andrea Frohne, the painting "reclaims Egyptians as African and subverts the concept of ancient Egypt as the cradle of Western Civilization".

At the center of the painting, Basquiat depicts an Egyptian boat being guided down the Nile River by Osiris, the Egyptian god of the earth and vegetation. On the right panel of the painting, the words "ESCLAVE, SLAVE, ESCLAVE" appear on top of a black figure. Two letters of the word "NILE" are crossed out and Frohne suggests that, "The letters that are wiped out and scribbled over perhaps reflect the acts of historians who have conveniently forgotten that Egyptians were black and blacks were enslaved." On the left panel of the painting Basquiat has illustrated two Nubian-style masks under the word "NUBA". Nubians historically were darker in skin color, and were considered to be slaves by the Egyptian people.

Basquiat often incorporated Spanish words into his works as seen with "MUJER" (woman) written between the bottom mask and the silhouette of a woman. Charles M. Tatum, editor for Encyclopedia of Latino Culture, analyzed that "The Nile relates symbols from Basquiat's heritage, such as Spanish words and African masks, to the tumultuous experience of modern-day street life."

Throughout the rest of the painting, Basquiat highlights the "commercial exploitation of black people." Images of the Atlantic slave trade are juxtaposed like hieroglyphics alongside images of the Egyptian slave trade centuries before. The repetition of the word "SICKLE" in the center panel is a direct reference to the slave trade in the United States and slave labor under the plantation system. It may also refer to the illness sickle cell anemia, which is more common in African Americans in the United States compared to other ethnicities. The word "SALT" that appears on the right panel of the work refers to the Atlantic slave trade, as salt was another important commodity traded at that time. The phrase "EL GRAN ESPECTACULO" (the grand spectacle) stretched across the top of the painting, an "ironic commentary on a shameful, centuries-long tragedy."

== Exhibitions ==
El Gran Espectaculo (The Nile) was first exhibited in a show organized by Paige Powell in April 1983. Since then it has been included in various shows internationally, including retrospectives at the Whitney Museum in 1992 and the Brooklyn Museum in 2005.

== See also ==
- List of paintings by Jean-Michel Basquiat
- 1983 in art
