= Fun Gallery =

Former New York City art gallery (1982–1985)

- Established: 1981
- Dissolved: 1985
- Location: New York City, New York, U.S.
- Type: Art gallery
- Founders: Patti Astor; Bill Stelling

The Fun Gallery was an art gallery founded by Patti Astor and Bill Stelling in 1981. The Fun Gallery had a cultural impact until it closed in 1985. As the first art gallery in Manhattan's East Village, it exposed New York to the talents of street art by showcasing graffiti artists like Fab 5 Freddy, Futura 2000, Lee Quiñones, Zephyr, Dondi, Lady Pink, and ERO. Contemporary artists Kenny Scharf, Jean-Michel Basquiat, and Keith Haring also had solo exhibitions at the Fun Gallery.

== History ==
The Fun Gallery emerged from the punk scene of the late 1970s in the East Village. After Patti Astor returned to New York City in 1975, she became an underground film actress and hung out at the club CBGB, which became a punk rock and new wave venue for bands like Blondie, Talking Heads, and the Ramones. In the following years, other clubs followed, like Hurrah and the Mudd Club.

Astor befriended graffiti artist Fab 5 Freddy, a link between the uptown hip-hop and graffiti scenes and the downtown punk and art worlds. As Astor was filming the movie Wild Style in 1981, she asked graffiti artist Futura 2000 to create a mural in her East Third Street apartment. She celebrated the completion of the mural with a party where many artists and art influencers attended. Due to the positive reception, Astor's friend Bill Stelling offered up a small space to open an art gallery.

In September 1981, Astor opened the Fun Gallery in a storefront located at 229 East 11th Street for $175 a month. At the end of the year she relocated to 254 East 10th Street, where the rent was seven times more than the first. It was an alternative to the "pretentious" lower Manhattan art scene. Astor said, "We wanted to get away from that whole white people, white walls, white wine, Soho scene." It soon became a fixture in the downtown art scene.

Artist Kenny Scharf had one of his first solo shows at the Fun Gallery in 1981, and he is credited with naming the gallery. At first, the gallery took on a new name for each show based on whoever was showing. Scharf decided that for his show, it would be called Fun Galley and then the name became permanent. In October 1981, Fab 5 Freddy and Futura 2000 both had solo exhibitions at the Fun Gallery.

Artist Jean-Michel Basquiat had a solo exhibition at the Fun Gallery that opened on November 4, 1982. Basquiat's date for the opening was his girlfriend Madonna. Basquiat started out doing graffiti as SAMO, but by 1982 he had established gallery representation in the United States and Europe. Although his art dealer Bruno Bischofberger praised his Fun Gallery exhibition, Basquiat complained about the lack of professionalism and stated that he wasn't paid. Some of the paintings included in the show were Equals Pi and A Panel of Experts.

By 1983, artist Keith Haring was increasingly disassociating himself from the graffiti scene and was exhibiting his work in galleries. He wanted to support the Fun Gallery and the artists, so he agreed to participate for a February 1983 solo exhibition.

As the landscape of the East Village changed with other galleries opening and the rent increasing, Astor closed the Fun Gallery in 1985, and moved to Los Angeles. In 2013, Astor released her memoir, Fun Gallery… the True Story, recounting her time in East Village art scene during the 1980s.
