= Jean-Michel Basquiat =

American artist (1960–1988)

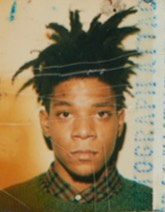
- Basquiat, c. 1986
- Born: December 22, 1960; New York City, U.S.
- Died: August 12, 1988 (aged 27); Manhattan, New York City, U.S.
- Cause of death: Accidental heroin overdose
- Resting place: Green-Wood Cemetery; Brooklyn, New York City, U.S.
- Years active: 1978–1988
- Known for: Painting, drawing
- Notable work: Irony of Negro Policeman (1981); Untitled (1981); Untitled (1982); Boy and Dog in a Johnnypump (1982); Defacement (1983); Hollywood Africans (1983)
- Movement: Neo-expressionism
- Website: basquiat.com

Jean-Michel Basquiat (/ˌbɑːskiˈɑː(t)/ BAH-skee-AH(T), French: [ʒɑ̃ miʃɛl baskja]; December 22, 1960 – August 12, 1988) was an American artist. He rose to success during the 1980s as part of the Neo-expressionism movement.

Basquiat first achieved notoriety in the late 1970s as part of the graffiti duo SAMO, alongside Al Diaz, writing enigmatic epigrams in Manhattan, particularly in the cultural hotbed of the Lower East Side where disco, punk, and street art coalesced into early hip-hop culture. By the early 1980s, his paintings were being exhibited in galleries and museums internationally. At 21, Basquiat became the youngest artist to ever take part in Documenta in Kassel, Germany. At 22, he became one of the youngest artists to exhibit at the Whitney Biennial in New York. The Whitney Museum of American Art held a retrospective of his artwork in 1992.

Basquiat's drew inspiration from his Haitian and Puerto Rican heritage and explored dichotomies such as wealth versus poverty and integration versus segregation. He combined poetry, drawing, and painting, bringing together text and image, abstraction, figuration, and historical information. He also used social commentary as a tool for introspection, identifying with his experiences as a Black American, and to challenge power structures and systems of racism.

Basquiat died at the age of 27 in 1988 of a heroin overdose. Since then, his work has steadily increased in value. In 2017, Untitled, a 1982 painting depicting a black skull with red-and-yellow rivulets, sold for a record-breaking $110.5 million, becoming one of the most expensive paintings ever purchased.

== Biography ==
=== Early life and education: 1960–1977 ===
Jean-Michel Basquiat was born on December 22, 1960, in Park Slope, Brooklyn, New York City, the second of four children to Matilde Basquiat (née Andrades, 1934–2008) and Gérard Basquiat (1930–2013). He had an older brother, Max, who died shortly before Jean-Michel's birth, and two younger sisters, Lisane (b. 1964) and Jeanine (b. 1967). His father was born in Port-au-Prince, Haiti, and his mother was born in Brooklyn to Puerto Rican parents. He was raised Catholic.

Matilde instilled a love for art in her young son by taking him to local art museums and enrolling him as a junior member of the Brooklyn Museum of Art. Basquiat was a precocious child who learned to read and write by the age of four. His mother encouraged her son's artistic talent and he often tried to draw his favorite cartoons. In 1967, he started attending Saint Ann's School, a private school. There he met his friend Marc Prozzo and together they created a children's book, written by Basquiat at the age of seven and illustrated by Prozzo.

In 1968, at the age of seven, Basquiat was hit by a car while playing in the street. His arm was broken and he suffered several internal injuries, which required a splenectomy. While he was hospitalized, his mother brought him a copy of Gray's Anatomy to keep him occupied. After his parents separated that year, Basquiat and his sisters were raised by their father. His mother was admitted to a psychiatric hospital when he was ten and thereafter spent her life in and out of institutions. By the age of 11, Basquiat was fluent in French, Spanish and English, and an avid reader of all three languages.

Basquiat's family resided in the Brooklyn neighborhood of Boerum Hill and then, in 1974, moved to Miramar, Puerto Rico. When they returned to Brooklyn in 1976, Basquiat attended Edward R. Murrow High School. He struggled to deal with his mother's instability and rebelled as a teenager. He ran away from home at 15 when his father caught him smoking cannabis in his room and proceeded to stab him "in the ass" with a knife. He slept on park benches at Washington Square Park and took LSD. Eventually, his father spotted him with a shaved head and called the police to bring him home.

In the 10th grade, he enrolled at City-As-School, an alternative high school in Manhattan, home to many artistic students who found conventional schooling difficult. He would skip school with his friends, but still received encouragement from his teachers, and began to write and illustrate for the school newspaper. He developed the character SAMO to endorse a faux religion. The saying "SAMO" had started as a private joke between Basquiat and his schoolmate Al Diaz, as an abbreviation for the phrase "Same old shit."

=== Street art and Gray: 1978–1980 ===
SAMO (for "same old") marked the witty sayings of a precocious and worldly teenage mind that, even at that early juncture, saw the world in shades of gray, fearlessly juxtaposing corporate commodity structures with the social milieu he wished to enter: the predominantly white art world.

— Franklin Sirmans, In the Cipher: Basquiat and Hip Hop Culture

In May 1978, Basquiat and Diaz began spray painting graffiti on buildings in Lower Manhattan. Working under the pseudonym SAMO, they inscribed poetic and satirical advertising slogans such as "SAMO© AS AN ALTERNATIVE TO GOD." In June 1978, Basquiat was expelled from City-As-School for pieing the principal. At 17, his father kicked him out of the house when he decided to drop out of school. He worked for the Unique Clothing Warehouse in NoHo while continuing to create graffiti at night. On December 11, 1978, The Village Voice published an article about the SAMO graffiti.

In 1979, Basquiat appeared on the live public-access television show TV Party hosted by Glenn O'Brien. Basquiat and O'Brien formed a friendship and he made regular appearances on the show over the next few years. Eventually, he began spending time writing graffiti around the School of Visual Arts, where he befriended students John Sex, Kenny Scharf, and Keith Haring.

In April 1979, Basquiat met Michael Holman at the Canal Zone Party and they founded the noise rock band Test Pattern, which was later renamed Gray. Other members of Gray included Shannon Dawson, Nick Taylor, Wayne Clifford and Vincent Gallo. They performed at nightclubs such as Max's Kansas City, CBGB, Hurrah and the Mudd Club.

During this period, Basquiat lived in the East Village with his friend Alexis Adler, a Barnard biology graduate. He often copied diagrams of chemical compounds borrowed from Adler's science textbooks. She documented Basquiat's creative explorations as he transformed the floors, walls, doors and furniture into his artworks. He also made postcards with his friends Jennifer Stein and John Sex.

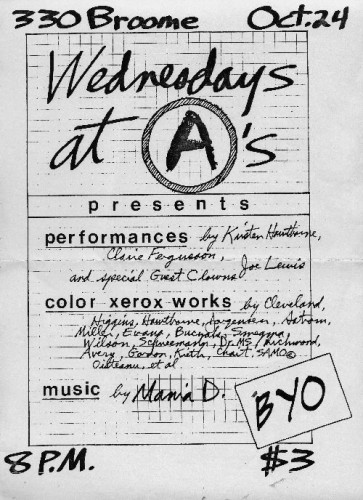
SAMO Xerox poster (1979)

In October 1979, at Arleen Schloss's open space called A's, Basquiat showed his SAMO montages using color Xerox copies of his works. Schloss allowed Basquiat to use the space to create his "MAN MADE" clothing, which were painted upcycled garments. In November 1979, costume designer Patricia Field carried his clothing line in her upscale boutique on 8th Street in Greenwich Village. Field also displayed his readymade sculptures in the store window.

Around this time, Basquiat encountered Pop artist Andy Warhol with art critic Henry Geldzahler at W.P.A. restaurant in SoHo. He sold Warhol a postcard titled Stupid Games, Bad Ideas. Seeking to establish a connection to Warhol, Basquiat later told Art in America, "I was also selling handmade postcards, and handpainted Abstract Expressionist sweatshirts, to make money. I even went to Interview magazine and bugged Andy Warhol, you know, to find out how to get closer to it."

When Basquiat and Diaz had a falling out, he inscribed "SAMO IS DEAD" on the walls of SoHo buildings in 1980. In June 1980, Basquiat appeared in High Times magazine, his first national publication, as part of an article titled "Graffiti '80: The State of the Outlaw Art" by Glenn O'Brien. Later that year, he began filming O'Brien's independent film Downtown 81 (2000), originally titled New York Beat, which featured two Gray recordings on its soundtrack.

=== Rise to fame: 1980–1982 ===
In June 1980, Basquiat participated in The Times Square Show, a multi-artist exhibition sponsored by Collaborative Projects Incorporated (Colab) and Fashion Moda. He was noticed by various critics and curators, including Jeffrey Deitch, who mentioned him in an article titled "Report from Times Square" in the September 1980 issue of Art in America. In February 1981, Basquiat participated in the New York/New Wave exhibition, curated by Diego Cortez at New York's P.S.1. Italian artist Sandro Chia recommended Basquiat's work to Italian dealer Emilio Mazzoli, who promptly bought 10 paintings for Basquiat to have a show at his gallery in Modena, Italy, in May 1981. In December 1981, art critic Rene Ricard published "The Radiant Child" in Artforum magazine, the first extensive article on Basquiat. During this period, Basquiat painted many pieces on objects he found in the streets, such as discarded doors.

Basquiat sold his first painting, Cadillac Moon (1981), to Debbie Harry, lead singer of the punk rock band Blondie, for $200 after they had filmed Downtown 81 together. However Debbie in her autobiography on page 174 states the painting was "Self-Portrait with Suzanne. He also appeared as a disc jockey in the 1981 Blondie music video "Rapture", a role originally intended for Grandmaster Flash. At the time, Basquiat was living with his girlfriend, Suzanne Mallouk, who financially supported him as a waitress.

In September 1981, art dealer Annina Nosei invited Basquiat to join her gallery at the suggestion of Sandro Chia. Soon after, he participated in her group show Public Address. She provided him with materials and a space to work in the basement of her gallery. In 1982, Nosei arranged for him to move into a loft, which also served as a studio at 101 Crosby Street in SoHo. He had his first American one-man show at the Annina Nosei Gallery in March 1982. He also painted in Modena for his second Italian exhibition in March 1982. That show was canceled, with Basquiat saying he felt exploited because he was expected to make eight paintings in one week.

=== International success: 1982–1986 ===
By the summer of 1982, Basquiat had left the Annina Nosei Gallery, and gallerist Bruno Bischofberger became his worldwide art dealer. In June 1982, at 21, Basquiat became the youngest artist to ever take part in Documenta in Kassel, Germany. His works were exhibited alongside Joseph Beuys, Anselm Kiefer, Gerhard Richter, Cy Twombly, and Warhol. Bischofberger gave Basquiat a one-man show at his Zurich gallery in September 1982, and arranged for him to meet Warhol for lunch on October 4, 1982. Warhol recorded in his diary, "I took a Polaroid and he went home and within two hours a painting was back, still wet, of him and me together." The painting, Dos Cabezas (1982), ignited a friendship between them. Basquiat was photographed by James Van Der Zee for an interview with Henry Geldzahler published in the January 1983 issue of Warhol's Interview magazine.

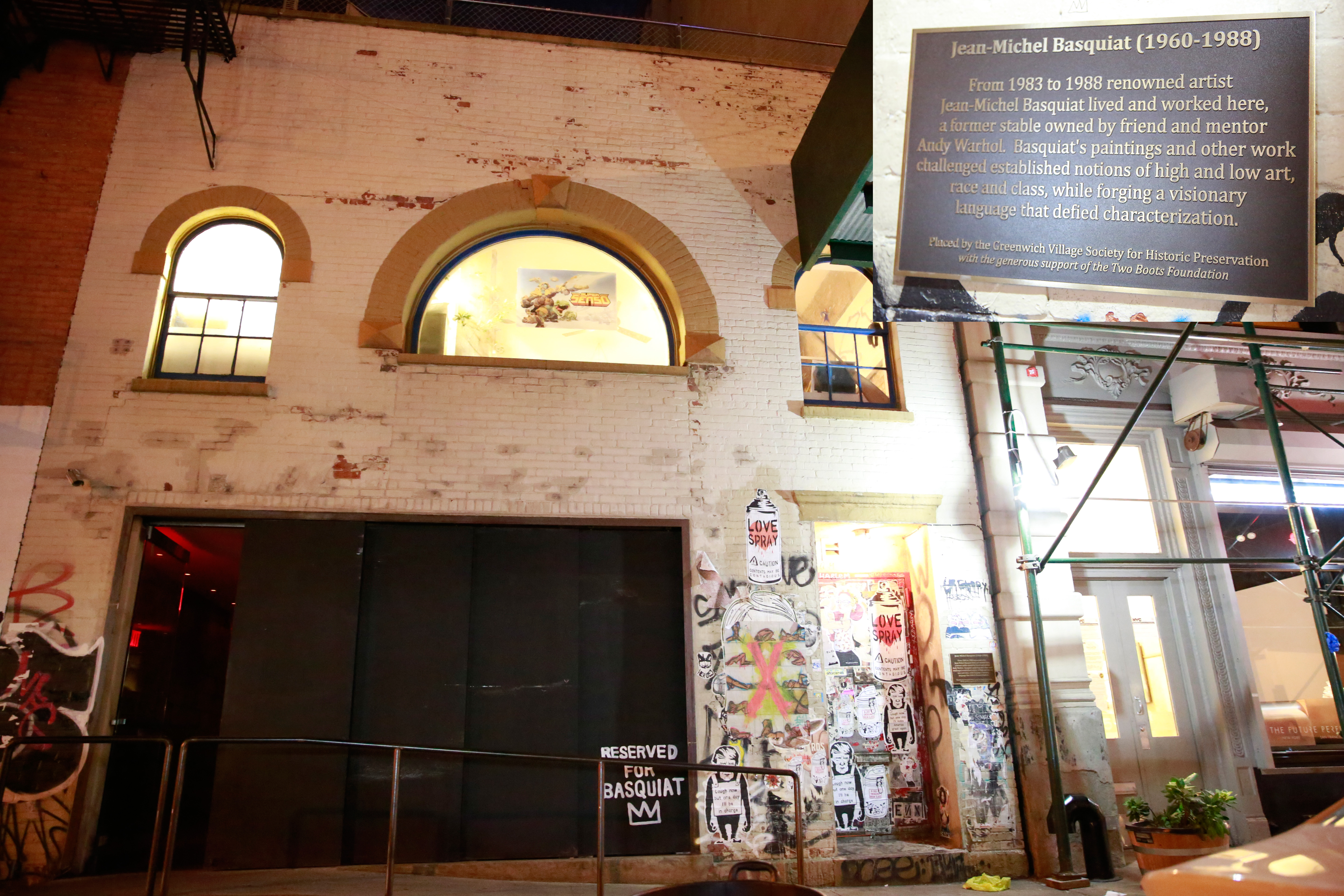
From 1983 to 1988 Basquiat lived at 57 Great Jones Street in NoHo, where he died. A plaque commemorating his life was placed outside the building in 2016; the block was named "Jean-Michel Basquiat Way" in 2025.

In November 1982, Basquiat's solo exhibition opened at the Fun Gallery in the East Village. Among the works exhibited were A Panel of Experts (1982) and Equals Pi (1982). In early December 1982, Basquiat began working at the Market Street studio space that art dealer Larry Gagosian had built below his Venice Beach, California home. In Los Angeles, Basquiat frequented the Whisky a Go Go and Tail o' the Pup with his friend artist George Condo. There, Basquiat commenced a series of paintings for a March 1983 show, his second at the Gagosian Gallery in West Hollywood. He was accompanied by his girlfriend, then-unknown singer Madonna. Gagosian later recalled: "Everything was going along fine. Jean-Michel was making paintings, I was selling them, and we were having a lot of fun. But then one day Jean-Michel said, 'My girlfriend is coming to stay with me.' … So I said, 'Well, what's she like?' And he said, 'Her name is Madonna and she's going to be huge.' I'll never forget that he said that."

Basquiat took considerable interest in the work that artist Robert Rauschenberg was producing at Gemini G.E.L. in West Hollywood. He visited him on several occasions and found inspiration in his accomplishments. While in Los Angeles, Basquiat painted Hollywood Africans (1983), which portrays him with graffiti artists Toxic and Rammellzee. He often painted portraits of other graffiti artists—and sometimes collaborators—in works such as Portrait of A-One A.K.A. King (1982), Toxic (1984), and ERO (1984). In 1983, he produced the hip-hop record "Beat Bop" featuring Rammellzee and rapper K-Rob. It was pressed in limited quantities on his Tartown Inc. imprint. He created the cover art for the single, making it highly desirable among both record and art collectors.

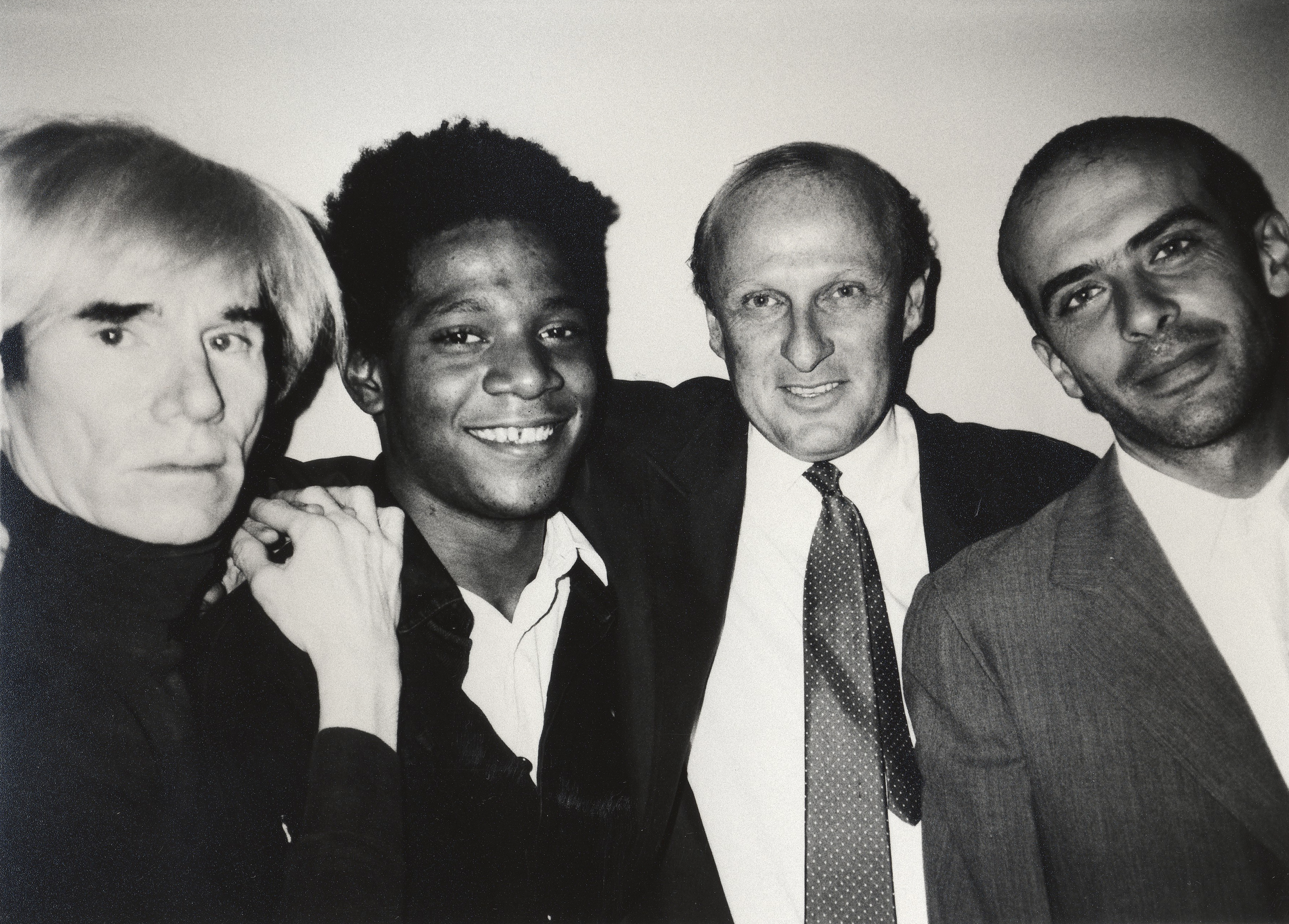
Andy Warhol, Basquiat, Bruno Bischofberger, and Francesco Clemente in 1984

In March 1983, at 22 years of age, Basquiat became one of the youngest artists to participate in the Whitney Biennial exhibition of contemporary art. Paige Powell, an associate publisher for Interview magazine, organized a show of his work at her friend's New York apartment in April 1983. Shortly after, he began a relationship with Powell, who was instrumental in fostering his friendship with Warhol. In August 1983, Basquiat moved into a loft owned by Warhol at 57 Great Jones Street in NoHo, which also served as a studio.

In the summer of 1983, Basquiat invited Lee Jaffe, a former musician in Bob Marley's band, to join him on a trip throughout Asia and Europe. On returning to New York, Basquiat was deeply affected by the death of Michael Stewart, an aspiring black artist in the downtown club scene who was killed by transit police in September 1983. He painted Defacement (The Death of Michael Stewart) (1983) in response to the incident. He also participated in a Christmas benefit with various New York artists for the family of Michael Stewart in 1983.

Having joined the Mary Boone's SoHo gallery in 1983, Basquiat had his first show there in May 1984. He collaborated with Warhol on several paintings between 1984 and 1985, including Olympics (1984), Taxi, 45th/Broadway (1984–85), and Zenith (1985). Their joint exhibition, Paintings, at the Tony Shafrazi Gallery, caused a rift in their friendship after it was panned by critics, and Basquiat was called Warhol's "mascot."

Basquiat often painted in expensive Armani suits and would appear in public in the same paint-splattered clothes. He was a regular at the Area nightclub, where he sometimes worked the turntables as a DJ for fun. He also painted murals for the Palladium nightclub in New York City. His swift rise to fame was covered in the media. He appeared on the cover of the February 10, 1985, issue of The New York Times Magazine in a feature titled "New Art, New Money: The Marketing of an American Artist". His work appeared in GQ and Esquire, and he was interviewed for MTV's "Art Break" segment. In 1985, he walked the runway for the Comme des Garçons Spring fashion show in New York.

In the mid-1980s, Basquiat was earning $1.4 million a year and he was receiving lump sums of $40,000 from art dealers. Despite his success, his emotional instability continued to haunt him. "The more money Basquiat made, the more paranoid and deeply involved with drugs he became," wrote journalist Michael Shnayerson. Basquiat's cocaine use became so excessive that he blew a hole in his nasal septum. One of Basquiat's friends later revealed that he had confessed to using heroin as early as 1980. Many of his peers speculated that his drug use was a means of coping with the demands of his newfound fame, the exploitative nature of the art industry, and the pressures of being a black man in the white-dominated art world.

For what would be his last exhibition on the West Coast, Basquiat returned to Los Angeles for his show at the Gagosian Gallery in January 1986. In February 1986, Basquiat traveled to Atlanta, Georgia, for an exhibition of his drawings at Fay Gold Gallery. That month, he participated in Limelight's Art Against Apartheid benefit. In the summer, he had a solo exhibition at Galerie Thaddaeus Ropac in Salzburg, Austria. He was also invited to walk the runway for Rei Kawakubo again, this time at the Comme des Garçons Homme Plus fashion show in Paris. In October 1986, Basquiat flew to Ivory Coast for an exhibition of his work organized by Bruno Bischofberger at the French Cultural Institute in Abidjan. He was accompanied by his girlfriend Jennifer Goode, who worked at his frequent hangout, Area nightclub. In November 1986, at 25 years old, Basquiat became the youngest artist given an exhibition at Kestner-Gesellschaft in Hanover, Germany.

=== Final years and death: 1986–1988 ===
During their relationship, Goode began snorting heroin with Basquiat, since drugs were at her disposal. She said: "He didn't push it on me, but it was just there and I was so naïve." In late 1986, she successfully got herself and Basquiat into a methadone program in Manhattan, but he quit after three weeks. According to Goode, he did not start injecting heroin until after she ended their relationship. In the last 18 months of his life, Basquiat became something of a recluse. His continued drug use is thought to have been a way of coping after the death of Warhol in February 1987.

In 1987, Basquiat had exhibitions at Galerie Daniel Templon in Paris, the Akira Ikeda Gallery in Tokyo, and the Tony Shafrazi Gallery in New York. Allen Ginsberg photographed Basquiat at the Shafrazi gallery attending William Burroughs' "Shotgun Artshow" on December 17, 1987. He designed a Ferris wheel for André Heller's Luna Luna, an ephemeral amusement park in Hamburg from June to August 1987 with rides designed by renowned contemporary artists.

In January 1988, Basquiat traveled to Paris for his exhibition at the Yvon Lambert Gallery and to Düsseldorf for an exhibition at the Hans Mayer Gallery. While in Paris, he befriended Ivorian artist Ouattara Watts. They made plans to travel together to Watts' birthplace, Korhogo, that summer. Following his exhibition at the Vrej Baghoomian Gallery in New York in April 1988, Basquiat traveled to Maui in June to withdraw from drug use. After returning to New York in July, Basquiat ran into Keith Haring on Broadway, who stated that this last encounter was the only time Basquiat ever discussed his drug problem with him. Glenn O'Brien also recalled Basquiat calling him and telling him he was "feeling really good." Despite attempts at sobriety, Basquiat died at the age of 27 of a heroin overdose at his home on Great Jones Street in Manhattan on August 12, 1988. He had been found unresponsive in his bedroom by his girlfriend Kelle Inman and was taken to Cabrini Medical Center, where he was pronounced dead on arrival.

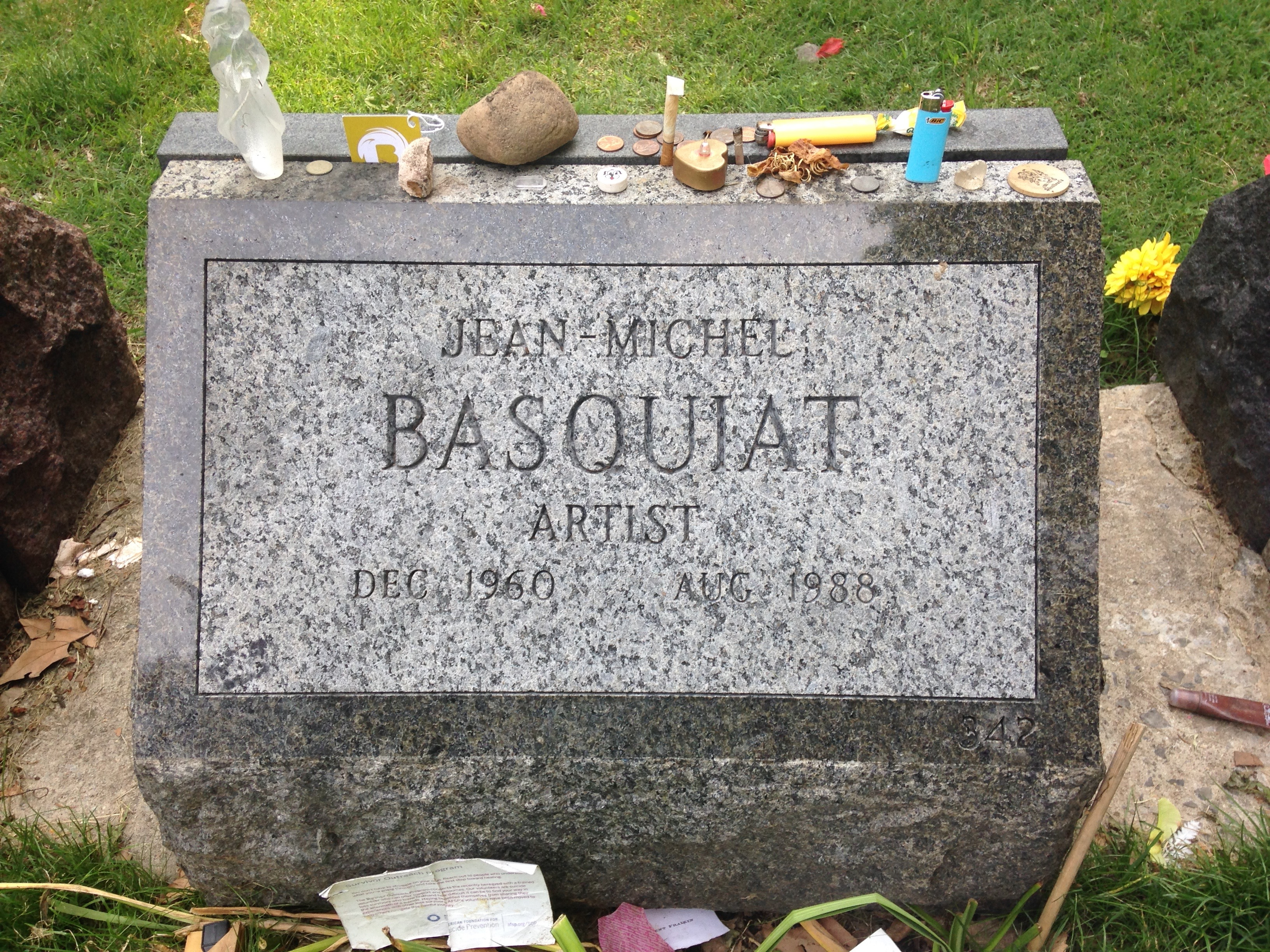
Basquiat's grave at Green-Wood Cemetery in Brooklyn, New York

Basquiat is buried at Brooklyn's Green-Wood Cemetery. A private funeral was held at Frank E. Campbell Funeral Chapel on August 17, 1988. The funeral was attended by immediate family and close friends, including Keith Haring, Francesco Clemente, Glenn O'Brien, and Basquiat's former girlfriend Paige Powell. Art dealer Jeffrey Deitch delivered a eulogy.

A public memorial was held at Saint Peter's Church on November 3, 1988. Among the speakers was Ingrid Sischy, who as the editor of Artforum got to know Basquiat well and commissioned a number of articles that introduced his work to the wider world. Basquiat's former girlfriend Suzanne Mallouk recited sections of A. R. Penck's "Poem for Basquiat" and his friend Fab 5 Freddy read a poem by Langston Hughes. The 300 guests included musicians John Lurie and Arto Lindsay, Haring, poet David Shapiro, Glenn O'Brien, and members of Basquiat's former band Gray.

In memory of the late artist, Haring created the painting A Pile of Crowns for Jean-Michel Basquiat (1988). In the obituary Haring wrote for Vogue, he stated: "He truly created a lifetime of works in ten years. Greedily, we wonder what else he might have created, what masterpieces we have been cheated out of by his death, but the fact is that he has created enough work to intrigue generations to come. Only now will people begin to understand the magnitude of his contribution."

== Artistry ==
Basquiat's canon revolves around single heroic figures: athletes, prophets, warriors, cops, musicians, kings and the artist himself. In these images the head is often a central focus, topped by crowns, hats, and halos. In this way the intellect is emphasized, lifted up to notice, privileged over the body and the physicality of these figures (i.e. black men) commonly represent in the world.

— Kellie Jones, Lost in Translation: Jean-Michel in the (Re)Mix

Art critic Franklin Sirmans analyzed that Basquiat appropriated poetry, drawing, and painting, and married text and image, abstraction, figuration, and historical information mixed with contemporary critique. His social commentary was acutely political and direct in its criticism of colonialism and support for class struggle. He also explored artistic legacies from wide sources, including an interrogation of the classical tradition. Art historian Fred Hoffman hypothesizes that the underlying of Basquiat's self-identification as an artist was his "innate capacity to function as something like an oracle, distilling his perceptions of the outside world down to their essence and, in turn, projecting them outward through his creative act", and that his art focused on recurrent "suggestive dichotomies" such as wealth versus poverty, integration versus segregation, and inner versus outer experience.

Before his career as a painter began, Basquiat produced punk-inspired postcards for sale on the street, and became known for his political–poetical graffiti under the name of SAMO. He often drew on random objects and surfaces, including other people's clothing. The conjunction of various media is an integral element of his art. His paintings are typically covered with codes of all kinds: words, letters, numerals, pictograms, logos, map symbols, and diagrams.

Basquiat primarily used texts as reference sources. A few of the books he used were Gray's Anatomy, Henry Dreyfuss' Symbol Sourcebook, Leonardo da Vinci published by Reynal & Company, and Burchard Brentjes' African Rock Art, Flash of the Spirit by Robert Farris Thompson.

A middle period from late 1982 to 1985 featured multi-panel paintings and individual canvases with exposed stretcher bars, the surface dense with writing, collage, and imagery. Between 1983 and 1985, Basquiat also made several works in collaboration with Andy Warhol and Francesco Clemente.

=== Drawings ===
Basquiat's drawing of art critic Rene Ricard, Untitled (Axe/Rene) (1984)

In his short but prolific career, Basquiat produced around 1,500 drawings, around 600 paintings, and many sculpture and mixed media works. He drew constantly and often used objects around him as surfaces when paper was not immediately at hand. Since childhood, he produced cartoon-inspired drawings when encouraged by his mother's interest in art, and drawing became a part of his expression as an artist. He drew in many different media, most commonly ink, pencil, felt-tip or marker, and oil-stick. He sometimes used Xerox copies of fragments of his drawings to paste onto the canvases of larger paintings.

The first public showing of Basquiat's paintings and drawings was in 1981 at the MoMA PS1 New York/New Wave exhibition. Rene Ricard's article "Radiant Child" in Artforum magazine brought Basquiat to the attention of the art world. Basquiat immortalized Ricard in two drawings, Untitled (Axe/Rene) (1984) and René Ricard (1984).

A poet as well as an artist, words featured heavily in his drawings and paintings, with direct references to racism, slavery, the people and street scene of 1980s New York, black historical figures, famous musicians, and athletes, as his notebooks and many important drawings demonstrate. Often Basquiat's drawings were untitled, and as such, to differentiate works, a word written within the drawing is commonly in parentheses after Untitled. After Basquiat died, his estate was controlled by his father Gérard Basquiat, who also oversaw the committee that authenticated artworks, and operated from 1994 to 2012 to review over 2000 works, the majority of which were drawings.

=== Heroes and saints ===
A prominent theme in Basquiat's work is the portrayal of historically prominent black figures, who were identified as heroes and saints. His early works often featured the iconographic depiction of crowns and halos to distinguish heroes and saints in his specially chosen pantheon. "Jean-Michel's crown has three peaks, for his three royal lineages: the poet, the musician, the great boxing champion. Jean measured his skill against all he deemed strong, without prejudice as to their taste or age", said his friend and artist Francesco Clemente. Reviewing Basquiat's show at the Bilbao Guggenheim, Art Daily noted that "Basquiat's crown is a changeable symbol: at times a halo and at others a crown of thorns, emphasizing the martyrdom that often goes hand in hand with sainthood. For Basquiat, these heroes and saints are warriors, occasionally rendered triumphant with arms raised in victory."

Basquiat was particularly a fan of bebop and cited saxophonist Charlie Parker as a hero. He frequently referenced Parker and other jazz musicians in paintings such as Charles the First (1982) and Horn Players (1983), and King Zulu (1986). "Basquiat looked to jazz music for inspiration and for instruction, much in the same way that he looked to the modern masters of painting", said art historian Jordana Moore Saggese.

=== Death and marginalization ===
Untitled (Skull) (1981)

In his exploration of death and marginalization, Basquiat's portrayal of dismembered black bodies serves as a radical commentary on the trauma of displacement and the alienation experienced by African Americans. His depiction of anatomical parts, such as exposed internal organs and skeletal structures, mirrors the violent fragmentation of black identity under systemic racism. Basquiat's repeated use of skulls and corpses underscores the existential anxiety of blackness in a society that dehumanizes and objectifies the black body.

A major reference source used by Basquiat throughout his career was the book Gray's Anatomy, which his mother had given him while he was in the hospital when he was seven. It remained influential in his depictions of human anatomy, and in its mixture of image and text as seen in Flesh and Spirit (1982–83). Art historian Olivier Berggruen situates in Basquiat's anatomical screen prints Anatomy (1982) an assertion of vulnerability, one which "creates an aesthetic of the body as damaged, scarred, fragmented, incomplete, or torn apart, once the organic whole has disappeared. Paradoxically, it is the very act of creating these representations that conjures a positive corporeal valence between the artist and his sense of self or identity."

Heads and skulls are significant focal points of many of Basquiat's most seminal works. Heads in works like Untitled (Two Heads on Gold) (1982) and Philistines (1982) are reminiscent of African masks, suggesting a cultural reclamation. The skulls allude to Haitian Vodou, which is filled with skull symbolism; the paintings Red Skull (1982) and Untitled (1982) can be seen as primary examples. In reference to the potent image depicted in Untitled (Skull) (1981), art historian Fred Hoffman writes that Basquiat was likely "caught off guard, possibly even frightened, by the power and energy emanating from this unexpected image." Further investigation by Hoffman in his book The Art of Jean-Michel Basquiat reveals a deeper interest in the artist's fascination with heads that proves an evolution in the artist's oeuvre from one of raw power to one of more refined cognizance.

=== Heritage ===
Basquiat's diverse cultural heritage was one of his many sources of inspiration. He often incorporated Spanish words into his artworks like Untitled (Pollo Frito) (1982) and Sabado por la Noche (1984). Basquiat's La Hara (1981), a menacing portrait of a white police officer, combines the Nuyorican slang term for police (la jara) and the Irish surname O'Hara. The black-hatted figure that appears in his paintings The Guilt of Gold Teeth (1982) and Despues De Un Pun (1987) is believed to represent Baron Samedi, the spirit of death and resurrection in Haitian Vodou.

Basquiat has various works deriving from African-American history, namely Slave Auction (1982), Undiscovered Genius of the Mississippi Delta (1983), El Gran Espectaculo (The Nile) (1983), and Jim Crow (1986). Another painting, Irony of Negro Policeman (1981), illustrates how African-Americans have been controlled by a predominantly white society. Basquiat sought to portray that African-Americans have become complicit with the "institutionalized forms of whiteness and corrupt white regimes of power" years after the Jim Crow era had ended. This concept has been reiterated in additional Basquiat works, including Created Equal (1984).

In the essay "Lost in Translation: Jean-Michel in the (Re)Mix", Kellie Jones posits that Basquiat's "mischievous, complex, and neologistic side, with regard to the fashioning of modernity and the influence and effluence of black culture" are often elided by critics and viewers, and thus "lost in translation."

=== Blackness, identity, and aesthetics ===
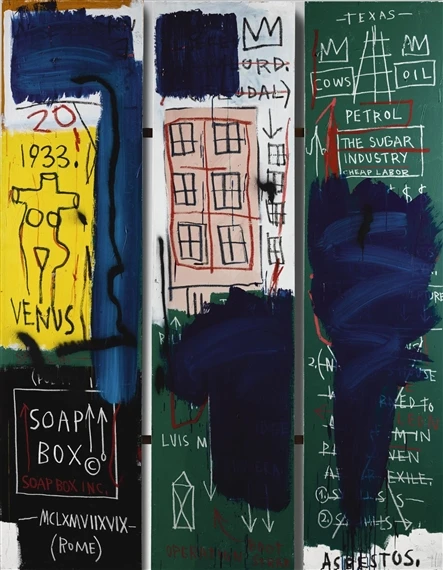
Untitled (1983)

Basquiat's artwork stands at the intersection of blackness, identity, and aesthetics, grappling with complex questions of representation and self-reflexivity. His work disrupts the boundaries of high art, redefining the aesthetics of black identity through distinctive use of symbols, language, and visual style. Basquiat's engagement with black identity is inseparable from his exploration of a commodified American Africanism. His oeuvre, which includes graffiti under the moniker "SAMO©", critiques mainstream racial representations and constructs a fluid African American identity. Through his "economies of accumulation", Basquiat challenges the simplified constructions of blackness, rejecting the essentialist narratives imposed by the art world. His art incorporates motifs that signify historical and modern racial struggles, rendering the African American experience as both a subject of critique and aesthetic innovation.

Basquiat's artwork serves as a method of identity formation, navigating the ontological and aesthetic challenges posed by blackness. His depictions of the black body resist reductive racial representations, instead offering a vibrant, complex subjectivity that reclaims blackness from its "aesthetic colonization". Basquiat's use of graffiti and street art, often marginalized within the traditional art world, communicates stories of resistance and identity that resonate with the broader African diaspora.

Moreover, Basquiat's artworks evoke a historical and political consciousness, often referencing figures from both the African American cultural pantheon and Western scientific history. His 1983 piece Untitled (Charles Darwin) juxtaposes the legacy of evolutionary science with broader themes of marginality, connecting the legacies of Darwin, Huxley, and Mendel to the commodification of blackness and the manipulation of scientific discourse for socio-political ends. This interplay between science and art highlights how Basquiat critiques both racial and intellectual histories, revealing their entanglement in narratives of oppression and commodification.

Finally, Basquiat's relationship with hip-hop culture further enriches his aesthetic of blackness. His collaborations with artists from the hip-hop generation, such as Fab 5 Freddy and Lady Pink, emphasize the fusion of Neo-expressionism with the rhythmic, improvisational qualities of hip-hop. This synthesis of art and music positions Basquiat as a figure who not only represented blackness but actively participated in shaping its cultural expression during the 1980s. His works, much like the art of graffiti, blur the lines between high art and street culture, reinforcing the legitimacy of non-traditional forms of black expression.

== Reception ==
Like a DJ, Basquiat adeptly reworked Neo-expressionism's clichéd language of gesture, freedom, and angst and redirected Pop art's strategy of appropriation to produce a body of work that at times celebrated black culture and history but also revealed its complexity and contradictions.

— Lydia Lee

Shortly after Basquiat's death in 1988, Michael Wines of The New York Times described him as "the most famous of only a small number of young black artists who have achieved national recognition."

Art critic Bonnie Rosenberg remarked that "while the larger public latched on to the superficial exoticism of his work and were captivated by his overnight celebrity, his art, which has often been described inaccurately as 'naif' and 'ethnically gritty,' held important connections to expressive precursors, such as Jean Dubuffet and Cy Twombly."

Interpretations of Basquiat's work often focus on the subdued emotional tone of his subjects. Writer Stephen Metcalf observed: "As Basquiat moved toward more conventional painting, he transitioned from streetscapes to human figures. These are shown frontally, with little or no depth of field, and nerves and organs are exposed, as in an anatomy textbook. Are these creatures dead and being clinically dissected, one wonders, or alive and in immense pain?"

Another aspect of Basquiat's aesthetic was his intention to communicate a personal perspective on the world. Gallerist Niru Ratnam described this a "highly individualistic, expressive view of the world." Art historian Luis Alberto Mejia Clavijo suggested that Basquiat's work inspires people to "paint like a child, don't paint what is in the surface but what you are re-creating inside." Musician David Bowie, who collected Basquiat's work, stated that "he seemed to digest the frenetic flow of passing image and experience, put them through some kind of internal reorganization and dress the canvas with this resultant network of chance."

Writer Olivia Laing noted Basquiat's attention to language, observing that "words jumped out at him, from the back of cereal boxes or subway ads, and he stayed alert to their subversive properties, their double and hidden meaning." In his 1981 article "The Radiant Child," art critic Rene Ricard praised Basquiat's use of language:

I'm always amazed at how people come up with things. Like Jean-Michel. How did he come up with the words he puts all over everything, his way of making a point without overstating the case, using one or two words he reveals a political acuity, gets the viewer going in the direction he wants, the illusion of the bombed-over wall. One or two words containing a full body. One or two words on a Jean-Michel contain the entire history of graffiti. What he incorporates into his pictures, whether found or made, is specific and selective. He has a perfect idea of what he's getting across, using everything that collates to his vision.

In his 2005 essay "Basquiat in History," curator Marc Mayer examined the ambiguity of Basquiat's work:

Basquiat speaks articulately while dodging the full impact of clarity like a matador. We can read his pictures without strenuous effort—the words, the images, the colors and the construction—but we cannot quite fathom the point they belabor. Keeping us in this state of half-knowing, of mystery-within-familiarity, had been the core technique of his brand of communication since his adolescent days as the graffiti poet SAMO. To enjoy them, we are not meant to analyze the pictures too carefully. Quantifying the encyclopedic breadth of his research certainly results in an interesting inventory, but the sum cannot adequately explain his pictures, which requires an effort outside the purview of iconography.

In the 1980s, art critic Robert Hughes dismissed Basquiat's work as absurd. He attributed the "Basquiat phenomenon as a mixture of hype, overproduction, and a greedy art market."

In a 1997 review for The Daily Telegraph, art critic Hilton Kramer criticized Basquiat's artistic abilities, opening with the assertion that he had no understanding of what the word "quality" meant. Kramer described him as a "talentless hustler" and "street-smart but otherwise invincibly ignorant," arguing that he "used his youth, his looks, his skin colour and his abundant sex appeal to win an overnight fame that proved to be his undoing." He also questioned the judgement of contemporary art dealers, whom he characterized "as ignorant about art as Basquiat himself." Although Basquiat's paintings commanded high prices, Kramer maintained that his work never rose above "that lowly artistic station" of graffiti, which he said "acquired a cult status in certain New York art circles." He further opined that "as a result of the campaign waged by these art-world entrepreneurs on Basquiat's behalf—and their own, of course—there was never any doubt that the museums, the collectors and the media would fall into line."

== Exhibitions ==
Basquiat's first public exhibition was at The Times Square Show in New York in June 1980. In May 1981, he had his first solo exhibition at Galleria d'Arte Emilio Mazzoli in Modena. In late 1981, he joined the Annina Nosei Gallery in New York, where he had his first American one-man show from March to April 1982. In 1982, he also had shows at the Gagosian Gallery in West Hollywood, Galerie Bruno Bischofberger in Zurich, and the Fun Gallery in the East Village. Major exhibitions of his work include Jean-Michel Basquiat: Paintings 1981–1984 at the Fruitmarket Gallery in Edinburgh in 1984, which traveled to the Institute of Contemporary Arts in London and Museum Boijmans Van Beuningen in Rotterdam. In 1985, the University Art Museum, Berkeley hosted Basquiat's first solo American museum exhibition. His work was showcased at Kestner-Gesellschaft, Hannover in 1987 and 1989.

The first retrospective of his work was held by the Baghoomian Gallery in New York from October to November 1989. His first museum retrospective, Jean-Michel Basquiat, was at the Whitney Museum of American Art in New York from October 1992 to February 1993. The show was sponsored by AT&T, MTV and Basquiat's former girlfriend Madonna. It subsequently traveled to the Menil Collection in Texas; the Des Moines Art Center in Iowa; and the Montgomery Museum of Fine Arts in Alabama, from 1993 to 1994. In 1996, Madonna sponsored an exhibition of his work at the Serpentine Gallery in London.

In March 2005, the retrospective Basquiat was mounted by the Brooklyn Museum in New York. It subsequently traveled to the Museum of Contemporary Art, Los Angeles, and the Museum of Fine Arts, Houston. From October 2006 to January 2007, the first Basquiat exhibition in Puerto Rico was held at the Museo de Arte de Puerto Rico. In 2010, Basquiat's influence was highlighted in the exhibition Street and Studio: From Basquiat to Séripop at Kunsthalle Wien in Austria.

In 2014, Basquiat and the Bayou, a show presented by the Ogden Museum of Southern Art in New Orleans, focused on his works with themes of the American South. In 2015, the Brooklyn Museum in New York presented Basquiat: The Unknown Notebooks, the first major viewing of Basquiat's sketches, poetry, and notetaking. The show later traveled to the Pérez Art Museum Miami in Florida and an accompanying monogram was published.

In 2017, Basquiat Before Basquiat: East 12th Street, 1979–1980, which centered on his early readymade work, exhibited at the Museum of Contemporary Art Denver in Colorado. In September 2017, the Barbican Centre in London mounted Basquiat: Boom for Real. From April to May 2019, the Brant Foundation in New York, hosted an extensive exhibition of Basquiat's work with free admission. In June 2019, the Solomon R. Guggenheim Museum in New York presented Basquiat's "Defacement": The Untold Story. In December 2019, the National Gallery of Victoria in Melbourne opened the exhibition Keith Haring and Jean-Michel Basquiat: Crossing Lines.

In 2020, the Lotte Museum of Art mounted the first major Basquiat exhibition in Seoul. The Museum of Fine Arts, Boston exhibited Writing the Future: Basquiat and the Hip-Hop Generation from October 2020 to July 2021. Basquiat's family curated Jean-Michel Basquiat: King Pleasure, an immersive exhibition with over 200 never-before-seen and rarely shown works. It opened at the Starrett-Lehigh Building in Chelsea, New York in April 2022, and traveled to the Grand LA in Los Angeles the following year.

In 2022, the Albertina presented the first museum retrospective of Basquiat's work in Austria. The exhibition Seeing Loud: Basquiat and Music was mounted at the Montreal Museum of Fine Arts in 2022. In 2023, the show traveled to Paris as Basquiat Soundtracks at the Philharmonie de Paris. From November 2023 to January 2024, the Brant Foundation held the exhibition Basquiat X Warhol at their East Village location. In 2024, the gallery Hauser & Wirth presented Jean-Michel Basquiat. Engadin, dedicated to the paintings Basquiat created in Switzerland. In 2026, the Pérez Art Museum Miami in Florida, opened Basquiat: Figures, Signs, Symbols, highlighting ten works from the Kenneth C. Griffin Collection.

== Art market ==
Basquiat sold his first painting to singer Debbie Harry for $200 in 1981. Advised by Italian artist Sandro Chia, gallerist Emilio Mazzoli purchased ten of Basquiat's works for $10,000 and held an exhibition at his gallery in Modena in May 1981. Spurred by the Neo-expressionism art boom, his work was in great demand by 1982, which is considered his most valuable year. A majority of his highest-selling paintings at auction date to 1982. Recalling that year, Basquiat said, "I had some money; I made the best paintings ever." His paintings were priced at $5,000 to $10,000 in 1983—lowered from the range of $10,000 to $15,000 when he joined Mary Boone's gallery to reflect what she felt was consistent with those of other artists in her gallery. In 1984, it was reported that in two years his work appreciated in value by 500%. In the mid-1980s, Basquiat was earning $1.4 million a year as an artist. By 1985, his paintings were selling for $10,000 to $25,000 each. Basquiat's rise to fame in the international art market landed him on the cover of The New York Times Magazine in 1985, which was unprecedented for a young black artist.

Since Basquiat's death in 1988, the market for his work has developed steadily—in line with overall art market trends—with a dramatic peak in 2007 when, at the height of the art market boom, the global auction volume for his work was over $115 million. Brett Gorvy, deputy chairman of Christie's, described Basquiat's market as "two-tiered … The most coveted material is rare, generally dating from the best period, 1981–83." Until 2002, the highest amount paid for an original work of Basquiat's was $3.3 million for Self-Portrait (1982), which was sold at Christie's in 1998. In 2002, Profit I (1982) was sold at Christie's by drummer Lars Ulrich of the heavy metal band Metallica for $5.5 million. The proceedings of the auction were documented in the 2004 film Metallica: Some Kind of Monster.

Between 2007 and 2012, the price of Basquiat's work continued to steadily increase up to $16.3 million. The sale of Untitled (1981) for $20.1 million in 2012 elevated his market to a new stratosphere and soon other works in his oeuvre outpaced that record. His painting, Untitled (1981), depicting a fisherman, sold for $26.4 million in 2012. In 2013, Dustheads (1982) sold for $48.8 million at Christie's. In 2016, Air Power, part of David Bowie's art collection, was sold at auction for nearly $9 million.

Japanese billionaire Yusaku Maezawa purchased Untitled (1982), depicting a devil-like figure, for $57.3 million at Christie's in 2017. He later sold the painting for $85 million at Phillips in 2022. Maezawa also purchased Basquiat's Untitled (1982), a powerful depiction of a black skull with red and yellow rivulets, for a record-setting $110.5 million in May 2017. It is the second-highest price ever paid at an auction for artwork by an American artist.

In 2018, Flexible (1984) sold for $45.3 million, becoming Basquiat's first post-1983 painting to surpass the $20 million mark. In June 2020, Untitled (Head) (1982), sold for $15.2 million; a record for a Sotheby's online sale and a record for a Basquiat work on paper. In July 2020, Loïc Gouzer's Fair Warning app announced that an untitled drawing on paper sold for $10.8 million, which is a record high for an in-app purchase. Earlier that year, American businessman Ken Griffin purchased Boy and Dog in a Johnnypump (1982) for upwards of $100 million from art collector Peter Brant. In March 2021, Warrior (1982) sold for $41.8 million at Christie's in Hong Kong, which is the most expensive Western work of art sold at auction in Asia. In May 2021, In This Case (1983) sold for $93.1 million at Christie's in New York. Later that year, Donut Revenge (1982) sold for $20.9 million at Christie's in Hong Kong.

After reaching a record high of $439.6 million in 2021, Basquiat's annual auction sales fell 50% in 2022. Nevertheless, his art is still in high demand. In 2022, Sugar Ray Robinson (1982) sold for $32.6 million at Christie's. In 2023, El Gran Espectaculo (The Nile) (1983) sold for $67.1 million at Christie's, and Self-Portrait as a Heel (Part Two) (1982) sold for $42 million at Sotheby's. In 2024, Untitled (ELMAR) (1982) sold for $46.5 million at Phillips. In 2025, his painting Crowns (Peso Neto) (1981) sold at Sotheby's for $48.3 million.

=== Authentication committee ===
The authentication committee of the estate of Jean-Michel Basquiat was formed by the Robert Miller Gallery, the gallery that was assigned to handle Basquiat's estate after his death, in part to wage battle against the growing number of fakes and forgeries in the Basquiat market. The cost of the committee's opinion was $100. The committee was headed by Basquiat's father Gérard Basquiat. Members varied depending on who was available at the time when a piece was being authenticated, but they have included the curators and gallerists Diego Cortez, Jeffrey Deitch, Annina Nosei, John Cheim, Richard Marshall, Fred Hoffman, and publisher Larry Warsh.

In 2008, the authentication committee was sued by collector Gerard De Geer, who claimed the committee breached its contract by refusing to offer an opinion on the authenticity of the painting Fuego Flores (1983). After the lawsuit was dismissed, the committee ruled the work genuine. In January 2012, the committee announced that after eighteen years it would dissolve in September of that year and no longer consider applications.

=== Forgeries and financial crimes ===
In 1994, three paintings displayed as Basquiats at the FIAC were revealed to be fakes. In June 2002, New York artist Alfredo Martinez was charged by the Federal Bureau of Investigation with attempting to deceive two art dealers by selling them $185,000 worth of fake Basquiat drawings. The charges against Martinez, which landed him in prison for 21 months, involved a scheme to sell drawings he copied from authentic artworks, accompanied by forged certificates of authenticity. Martinez claimed he had been selling fake Basquiat drawings for 18 years.

In 2007, Christie's was sued by art collector Guido Orsi and art dealer Tony Shafrazi, for allegedly selling Shafrazi a fake Basquiat, which Orsi later purchased. Christie's rejected the charge, and the case was dismissed in November 2011. In 2007, Basquiat's painting Hannibal (1982) was seized by federal authorities as part of an embezzlement scheme by convicted Brazilian money launderer and former banker Edemar Cid Ferreira. Ferreira had purchased the painting with illegally acquired funds while he controlled Banco Santos in Brazil. It was shipped to a Manhattan warehouse, via the Netherlands, with a false shipping invoice stating it was worth $100. The painting was later sold at Sotheby's for $13.1 million in 2016.

In March 2014, Basquiat's sisters filed a $1 million lawsuit against Christie's, claiming the auction house tried to sell fake Basquiat artworks and falsely suggested they were approved by the artist's estate. In 2020, a Los Angeles man, Philip Bennet Righter, pled guilty to art fraud after trying to sell forged paintings by Basquiat and Warhol. Also in 2020, in France, an exhibition of drawings attributed to Basquiat at the Volcano gallery in Nuits-Saint-Georges was disputed.

In February 2022, the Orlando Museum of Art mounted the controversial exhibition Heroes & Monsters, which consisted of 25 cardboard works that were claimed to have been sold by Basquiat directly to screenwriter Thad Mumford in 1982, and then placed in storage, where they remained until being rediscovered in 2012. The paintings were seized in a raid by the Federal Bureau of Investigation in June 2022. The New York Times obtained an affidavit that revealed Mumford signed a declaration in the presence of federal agents stating that "at no time in the 1980s or any other time did I meet with Jean-Michel Basquiat, and at no time did I acquire or purchase any paintings from him." Los Angeles auctioneer Michael Barzman confessed to creating a suite of 25 Basquiat forgeries that wound up at the Orlando Museum of Art and was sentenced to community service and probation. In 2023, Florida art dealer Daniel Elie Bouaziz was sentenced to 27 months in federal prison for a money laundering scheme to sell counterfeit contemporary artworks, including pieces purportedly by Basquiat, Warhol, and Banksy.

== Sexuality ==
Basquiat had several romantic relationships with women, including singer Madonna. Although he never publicly identified as bisexual, a few of his friends have stated that he had sexual relationships with men. Joey Arias said that he saw Basquiat naked with Klaus Nomi in Nomi's New York City apartment. Basquiat's former girlfriend Suzanne Mallouk described his sexual interest as "not monochromatic. It did not rely on visual stimulation, such as a pretty girl. It was a very rich multichromatic sexuality. He was attracted to people for all different reasons. They could be boys, girls, thin, fat, pretty, ugly … He was attracted to intelligence more than anything and to pain."

Biographer Phoebe Hoban wrote about Basquiat's first sexual experiences, which were with men. When Basquiat was a minor in Puerto Rico he was orally raped by a barber dressed in drag, then he got involved with a deejay. Art critic Rene Ricard said that Basquiat was into everything and had "turned tricks" in Condado when he lived in Puerto Rico. As a teenager, Basquiat told a friend that he worked as a prostitute on 42nd Street in Manhattan when he ran away from home. Andy Warhol recalled a time Basquiat had refused to go with him and Keith Haring to Rounds, a gay hustler bar, because it brought back unpleasant memories of when he was hustling. Basquiat's relationship with Warhol was platonic, with Warhol serving as a mentor. Warhol also referred to Basquiat's girlfriends in his diary, at one point noting that he had "three or four girls on the string."

== Legacy ==
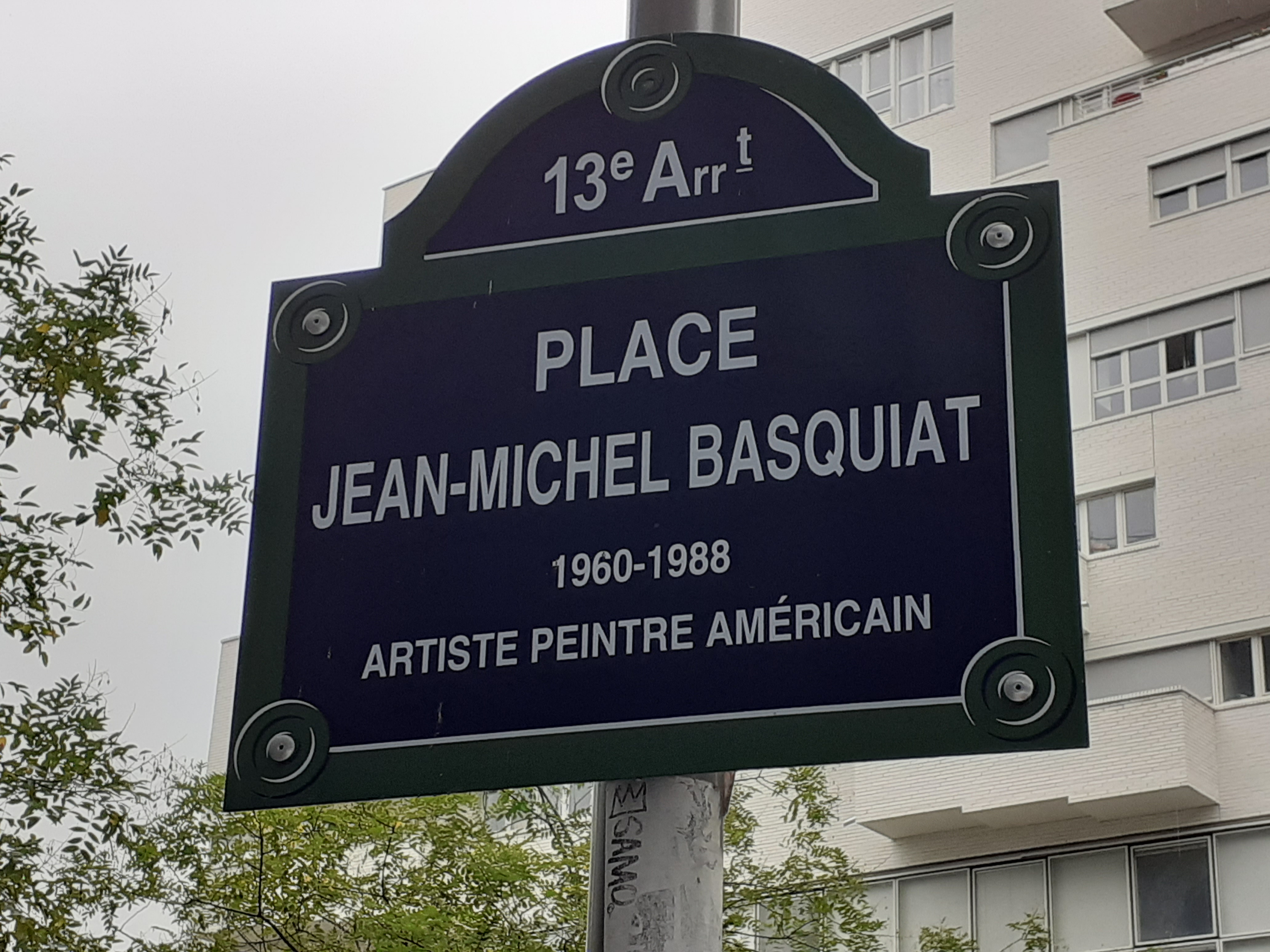
Place Jean-Michel Basquiat in Paris

Basquiat's estate was administered by his father, Gerard Basquiat, until his passing in 2013. It is now run by his sisters, Jeanine Heriveaux and Lisane Basquiat. His work had a significant impact on the street art and hip hop scene, and has been noted as an influence on a range of contemporary artists including Banksy, Shepard Fairey, and Halim Flowers.

In 2016, the Greenwich Village Society for Historic Preservation placed a plaque commemorating Basquiat's life outside his former residence at 57 Great Jones Street in Manhattan.

In 2017, Basquiat was posthumously awarded the key to the city of Brooklyn by Borough President Eric Adams and honored on the Celebrity Path at the Brooklyn Botanic Garden.

Before the exhibition Basquiat: Boom for Real at London's Barbican Centre in 2017, graffiti artist Banksy created two murals inspired by Basquiat on the walls of the Barbican. The first mural depicts Basquiat's painting Boy and Dog in a Johnnypump (1982) being searched by two police officers. The second mural depicts a carousel with the carriages replaced with Basquiat's signature crown motif. In 2018, a public square in the 13th arrondissement of Paris was named Place Jean-Michel Basquiat in his memory.

For the 2020–21 NBA season, the Brooklyn Nets honored Basquiat with their City Edition uniform and a court design inspired by his art. In 2021, the Joe and Clara Tsai Foundation funded a Basquiat educational arts program developed in partnership between the Brooklyn Nets, the New York City Department of Education and the Fund for Public Schools. The Nets used a white version of the Basquiat City Edition uniform for the 2022–23 NBA season.

In October 2025, the block of 57 Great Jones Street in Manhattan, between Bowery and Lafayette, was named "Jean-Michel Basquiat Way." In October 2026, New Zealand-born artist Owen Dippie completed a nearly six-story mural of Basquiat nearby at 344 Bowery.

=== Fashion ===
In 2007, Basquiat was listed among GQ's 50 Most Stylish Men of the Past 50 Years. Basquiat often painted in expensive Armani suits and he did a photo shoot for Issey Miyake. Comme des Garçons was one of his favorite brands; he was a model for the Spring 1986 fashion show in New York and the Homme Plus Spring/Summer 1987 fashion show in Paris. To commemorate Basquiat's runway appearances, Comme des Garçons featured his prints in the brand's Fall/Winter 2018 collection. In 2015, Basquiat was featured on the cover of T: The New York Times Style Magazine Men's Style issue and Vanity Fair's Art and Artists Special Edition.

Valentino's Fall/Winter 2006 collection paid homage to Basquiat. Sean John created a capsule collection for the 30th anniversary of Basquiat's death in 2018. Apparel and accessories companies that have featured Basquiat's work include Uniqlo, Urban Outfitters, Supreme, Herschel Supply Co., Alice + Olivia, Olympia Le-Tan, DAEM, Coach New York, and Saint Laurent. Footwear companies such as Dr. Martens, Reebok, and Vivobarefoot have also collaborated with Basquiat's estate.

In 2021, luxury jewelry company Tiffany & Co. partnered with American singer Beyoncé and rapper Jay-Z to promote the company's "About Love" campaign. The campaign incorporated Tiffany's recently acquired painting, Equals Pi (1982), by Basquiat. The painting heavily features a color close to the company's signature robin egg blue. The campaign was met with criticism from the artist's friends and colleagues. In 2022, Basquiat's estate partnered with Black Fashion Fair for a limited-run capsule collection, which was on view at the exhibition Jean-Michel Basquiat: King Pleasure in New York City. His hair has been imitated by Canadian pop singer The Weeknd and American rapper and businessman Jay-Z.

=== Film, television, and theater ===
Basquiat starred in Downtown 81, a vérité movie written by Glenn O'Brien and shot by Edo Bertoglio in 1980–81, but not released until 2000.

Without Walls: Shooting Star, a British documentary by Geoff Dunlop on Basquiat's life, aired on Channel 4 in 1990. In 1996, painter Julian Schnabel made his filmmaking debut with the biopic Basquiat starring Jeffrey Wright. Jean-Michel Basquiat: The Radiant Child, a documentary film directed by Tamra Davis, premiered at the 2010 Sundance Film Festival and was shown on the PBS series Independent Lens in 2011. Sara Driver directed the documentary film Boom for Real: The Late Teenage Years of Jean-Michel Basquiat, which premiered at the 2017 Toronto International Film Festival. In 2018, PBS aired the documentary Basquiat: Rage to Riches as part of the American Masters series.

In 2022, it was reported that actor Kelvin Harrison Jr. will star as Basquiat in an upcoming biopic titled Samo Lives, which will be written, directed and produced by Julius Onah. It was also announced that actor Stephan James will star and co-produce a limited series about Basquiat.

In 2022, The Collaboration, a play by Anthony McCarten about Basquiat and Warhol premiered at London's Young Vic Theatre, starring Jeremy Pope as Basquiat and Paul Bettany as Warhol. The play transferred to Broadway, for a limited run from December 2022 through March 2023, again starring Bettany and Pope, who later reprised their roles in the film adaptation.

In 2024, Basquiat's friend Roger Guenveur Smith wrote, directed, and performed the solo show In Honor of Jean-Michel Basquiat at St. Paul's Penumbra Theatre.

In 2025 the anthology He Had So Much to Say - Five Artists on Jean-Michel Basquiat was published by Louisiana Channel. The anthology features Alvaro Barrington, Arthur Jafa, Julie Mehretu, Dana Schutz and Ouattara Watts.

In 2026, Jean-Michel, the first Basquiat documentary to be approved by the artist's estate as well as the first directed by a person of color, premiered at the Tribeca Festival. The feature was directed by Quinn Whitney Wilson and Viridiana Lieberman, and was acquired by Netflix.

In October 2026, Jean, a biopic on Basquiat starring rapper Kid Cudi as Basquiat, was announced.

=== Video games ===
In 2022, the video game Fortnite introduced two cosmetics based off of Basquiat's Tuxedo (1982) and Pez Dispenser (1983).

=== Literature ===
In 1991, poet Kevin Young published the book To Repel Ghosts, a compendium of 117 poems relating to Basquiat's life, individual paintings, and social themes found in the artist's work. He published a "remix" of the book in 2005. In 1993, a children's book was released titled Life Doesn't Frighten Me, which combines a poem written by Maya Angelou with art made by Basquiat. In 1998, journalist Phoebe Hoban published the unauthorized biography Basquiat: A Quick Killing in Art. In 2000, author Jennifer Clement wrote the memoir Widow Basquiat: A Love Story, based on the narratives told to her by Basquiat's former girlfriend Suzanne Mallouk.

In 2005, poet M. K. Asante published the poem "SAMO", dedicated to Basquiat, in his book Beautiful. And Ugly Too. The children's book Radiant Child: The Story of Young Artist Jean-Michel Basquiat, written and illustrated by Javaka Steptoe, was released in 2016. The picture book won the Caldecott Medal in 2017. In 2019, illustrator Paolo Parisi wrote the graphic novel Basquiat: A Graphic Novel, following Basquiat's journey from street-art legend SAMO to international art-scene darling, up until his death. In 2025, Jean-Michel Basquiat: The Making of an Icon by Doug Woodham was published, offering a revealing examination of his life.

=== Music ===
Guitarist Vernon Reid of the funk metal band Living Colour wrote a song called "Desperate People", released on their album Vivid, which addresses the drug scene of New York during the mid-1980s. Reid was inspired to write the song after receiving a phone call from Greg Tate informing him that Basquiat had overdosed. In August 2014, Revelation 13:18 released the single "Old School", featuring Jean-Michel Basquiat, along with the self-titled album Revelation 13:18 x Basquiat. The release date of "Old School" coincided with the anniversary of Basquiat's death. In 2020, New York rock band the Strokes used Basquiat's painting Bird on Money (1981) as the cover art for their album The New Abnormal.

== See also ==
- List of Afro-Latinos
- List of paintings by Jean-Michel Basquiat
