= Suzanne Mallouk =

American-Canadian painter and psychiatrist

- Born: September 10, 1960 (age 65); Orangeville, Ontario, Canada
- Education: Hunter College; St. George's University School of Medicine; William Alanson White Institute
- Occupations: Psychiatrist; Psychoanalyst; Painter

Suzanne Mallouk (born September 10, 1960) is a Canadian-born painter, psychiatrist, and psychoanalyst, based in New York City. She is best known for her role within a core of East Village creatives in the 1980s and for her relationship with artist Jean-Michel Basquiat, much of which her friend Jennifer Clement chronicled in Widow Basquiat: A Memoir. In 2015, Vogue magazine listed Basquiat and Mallouk among "The 21 Most Stylish Art World Couples of All Time."

Mallouk was also involved in the pursuit of justice for the death of Michael Stewart, a boyfriend of hers and a fatality of police brutality in 1983. In 1985, Mallouk had a one-woman show at the Vox Populi Gallery in the East Village. She also had a brief music career as singer and songwriter, performing under the stage name Ruby Desire. From 1990 to 2005, she pursued higher education and became a Doctor of Medicine with a specialty in psychiatry.

== Life and career ==
=== Early life and move to New York ===
Mallouk was born in Orangeville, Ontario, Canada, on September 10, 1960. Her Palestinian father and British mother, a naval officer, met and married in Beirut before moving to Canada. As a teenager, Mallouk developed an interest in the 1970s punk movement, particularly Iggy Pop. After attending art school at H. B. Beal Secondary School in London, Ontario, she moved to New York City to pursue a career as an artist, inspired by the book Rene Ricard: 1979–1980.

Mallouk arrived in Manhattan on Valentine's Day in 1980 and spent the night at the Seville Hotel before relocating to the Martha Washington Hotel. Upon her arrival, she developed an anonymous phone relationship with poet Rene Ricard, whose number she had found in the phone book. Mallouk worked as a waitress at Max's Kansas City, then as a cigarette girl at the Ritz.

=== Relationship with Jean-Michel Basquiat ===
While tending bar at Night Birds, in the East Village, she met aspiring artist Jean-Michel Basquiat. From 1981 to 1983, they had an on-again, off-again relationship, remaining friends until his death in 1988. He had moved into her apartment in 1981, and she supported him financially while he focused on painting. In 1982, she and Basquiat moved into a loft provided by gallerist Annina Nosei in SoHo. Mallouk witnessed his transition from penniless artist to millionaire. Basquiat referred to her as "Venus" in his paintings, as, for example, in A Panel of Experts (1982), which depicts a fight between Mallouk and Madonna, his girlfriend at the time. "Venus" is also labelled in the drawing Cheese Popcorn (1982); and Mallouk is depicted in the drawings Self Portrait with Suzanne (1982) and Big Shoes (1983).

=== Death of Michael Stewart ===
Mallouk was dating aspiring artist and model Michael Stewart at the time of his death from police brutality in 1983. Stewart, an African-American man, had been detained by the New York City Transit Police for writing graffiti in the subway and was brought to Bellevue Hospital battered. Mallouk went to the hospital with Stewart's family; she took photos of him as he lay in a coma and gave them to the press. Stewart died from his injuries on September 28, 1983, 13 days after his arrest, at age 25. Mallouk helped organize the Michael Stewart Justice Committee. "I hired his legal team, raising money from the arts community," she said. "I went to every gallery that was showing graffiti art and asked for donations. I also got a large donation from Keith Haring, who gave the money from a sale of one of his paintings. Madonna did a show at Danceteria and donated all the proceeds." The officers arrested in connection with Stewart's death were acquitted of all charges in November 1985.

=== Art and music career ===
Mallouk worked for designer Maripol at Fiorucci. She posed for the Italian painter Francesco Clemente, and three of the paintings were shown at Galerie Bruno Bischofberger in Zurich for Collaborations: Basquiat, Clemente, Warhol in 1984. She was also photographed by Andy Warhol, and these photographs are in the Andy Warhol Foundation Archive. From February 9 to March 7, 1985, Mallouk had a solo exhibition at Colin de Land's Vox Populi Gallery on East 6th Street in the East Village. Later that year, she participated in the 92nd Street Y's "Artists' Hospitality Tour," where she discussed the development of her work with tourists in her studio. Her work is now held in private collections internationally and at the Nakamura Keith Haring Collection in Hokuto, Japan.

In the late 1980s, Mallouk performed under the name Ruby Desire at nightclubs such as Area, Madam Rosa's, and Palladium. She was signed to Les Disques Du Crépuscule and released a cover of Donna Summer's "Bad Girls" in 1987. Mallouk co-wrote the song "Like This Like That" by Madagascar, which was released on Capitol Records in 1988. With Capitol Records, she toured Europe as the song climbed the British dance charts. After the tour, she decided to leave the music business to go to school, and she worked as a bartender at the Tunnel nightclub.

=== Later career ===
The death of Basquiat in August 1988 and the AIDS epidemic were catalysts for Mallouk to leave the East Village. She went on to receive a bachelor's degree in psychology and chemistry from Hunter College in New York. In 2001, she graduated from St. George's University School of Medicine in Grenada, British West Indies. She completed her internship in internal medicine and residency in general psychiatry at Beth Israel Medical Center. She is a diplomate of the American Board of Psychiatry and Neurology and became a member of the American Psychoanalytic Association after completing psychoanalytic training at the William Alanson White Institute in New York City. Mallouk continues to paint and has a private practice in New York City as a psychiatrist and psychoanalyst.

== In pop culture ==
Claire Forlani as Gina Cardinale in the Julian Schnabel film Basquiat (1996) is a composite of Basquiat's girlfriends, including Mallouk.

In 2000, Mallouk's close friend Jennifer Clement published Widow Basquiat: A Memoir, a poetic memoir about Mallouk's relationship with Basquiat—told from Mallouk's perspective. The book was "inspired by" Mallouk's own writings and stories. "Widow Basquiat" was a nickname Rene Ricard gave to Mallouk years before Basquiat's death. The first American edition was released as Widow Basquiat: A Love Story in 2014.

== Discography ==
- 1987: Ruby Desire – "Bad Girls" (Interior Music IM002)
- 1989: Madagascar – "Like This Like That" from the compilation Black Havana (Capitol CDP 7 90923 2) (credited as Desire)

== Filmography ==
- 1984: Who Killed Michael Stewart?
- 2010: Jean-Michel Basquiat: The Radiant Child
- 2010: Basquiat, Une Vie
- 2011: Gray: Live at the New Museum
- 2017: Basquiat: Rage to Riches
