= Jean-Michel Basquiat: The Radiant Child =

2010 American documentary by Tamra Davis

- Theatrical release poster
- Directed by: Tamra Davis
- Produced by: Tamra Davis; David Koh; Lilly Bright; Stanley Buchthal; Alexis Manya Spraic
- Starring: Jean-Michel Basquiat
- Cinematography: Tamra Davis; David Koh; Harry Geller
- Edited by: Alexis Manya Spraic
- Music by: J. Ralph; Ad-Rock; Mike D
- Production companies: Curiously Bright Entertainment; LM Media GmbH; Fortissimo Films
- Distributed by: Arthouse Films
- Release dates: January 25, 2010 (Sundance); July 21, 2010 (United States)
- Running time: 90 minutes
- Country: United States
- Language: English

Jean-Michel Basquiat: The Radiant Child is a 2010 documentary film directed by Tamra Davis. It crosscuts excerpts from Davis' on-camera interview with the artist Jean-Michel Basquiat and anecdotes from his friends and associates. The film was shown at the Sundance Film Festival in 2010.

== Background ==
Tamra Davis was working in a Los Angeles art gallery in 1986 when she filmed an interview with her friend, Jean-Michel Basquiat. After Basquiat's death from a heroin overdose in 1988, Davis stored the footage away. In 2008, Davis was encouraged by gallerists at the Museum of Contemporary Art to do something with the footage. She began interviewing friends and associates of Basquiat's and pieced together a documentary. The film is titled after an article about Basquiat written by art critic Rene Ricard for Artforum in 1981.

== Synopsis ==
In the beginning of his 10-year career, Jean-Michel Basquiat was known for his graffiti art under the alias SAMO in Manhattan's Lower East Side in the late 1970s. He sold his first painting to Debbie Harry for $200, dated Madonna, and became a close friend and collaborator of Andy Warhol's. Basquiat was launched into international stardom for his bebop-influenced neoexpressionist work. However, soon his cult status began to overshadow his art. As a successful black artist, Basquiat was constantly confronted by racism and misconceptions. The Radiant Child draws from insider interviews and archival footage of Basquiat's telling his story in his own words.

== People interviewed ==
- Julian Schnabel
- Larry Gagosian
- Bruno Bischofberger
- Tony Shafrazi
- Fab Five Freddy
- Deitch Projects
- Glenn O'Brien
- Maripol
- Thurston Moore
- Nelson George
- Kai Eric
- Nicholas Taylor
- Fred Hoffmann
- Michael Holman
- Diego Cortez
- Annina Nosei
- Suzanne Mallouk
- Rene Ricard
- Kenny Scharf
- Robert Farris Thompson
- Kelle Inman

== Reviews ==
The film received positive reviews, however, critics noted that it doesn’t fully explore why Basquiat's work was so "innovative in the New York art scene of the 1980s." Slant Magazine wrote that "you see the paintings and hear people praise them, without the space to consider them in between, " adding: "The film's a decent introduction to a man who walked the world of SoHo, CBGB, and Andy Warhol's final days, but the more you know going into the movie, the more you sense it leaving out."

The Hollywood Reporter wrote: "Naturally, the doc is well illustrated with examples of Basquiat’s work, some of which are little-seen. But even those who dispute his place in art history should come away with a feeling for the man whose brief career is a textbook example of a flame burning too bright to last."

The Artforum wrote: "The movie gives a sense of how driven he was, how it seemed as if he aimed, by sheer volume, to assure himself a place in the pantheon of twentieth-century painters, when in fact he achieved that position by virtue of a necessarily smaller number of masterpieces, produced in the early and late stages of his heartbreakingly short career."
