= Place Jean-Michel Basquiat =

Public square in Paris, France

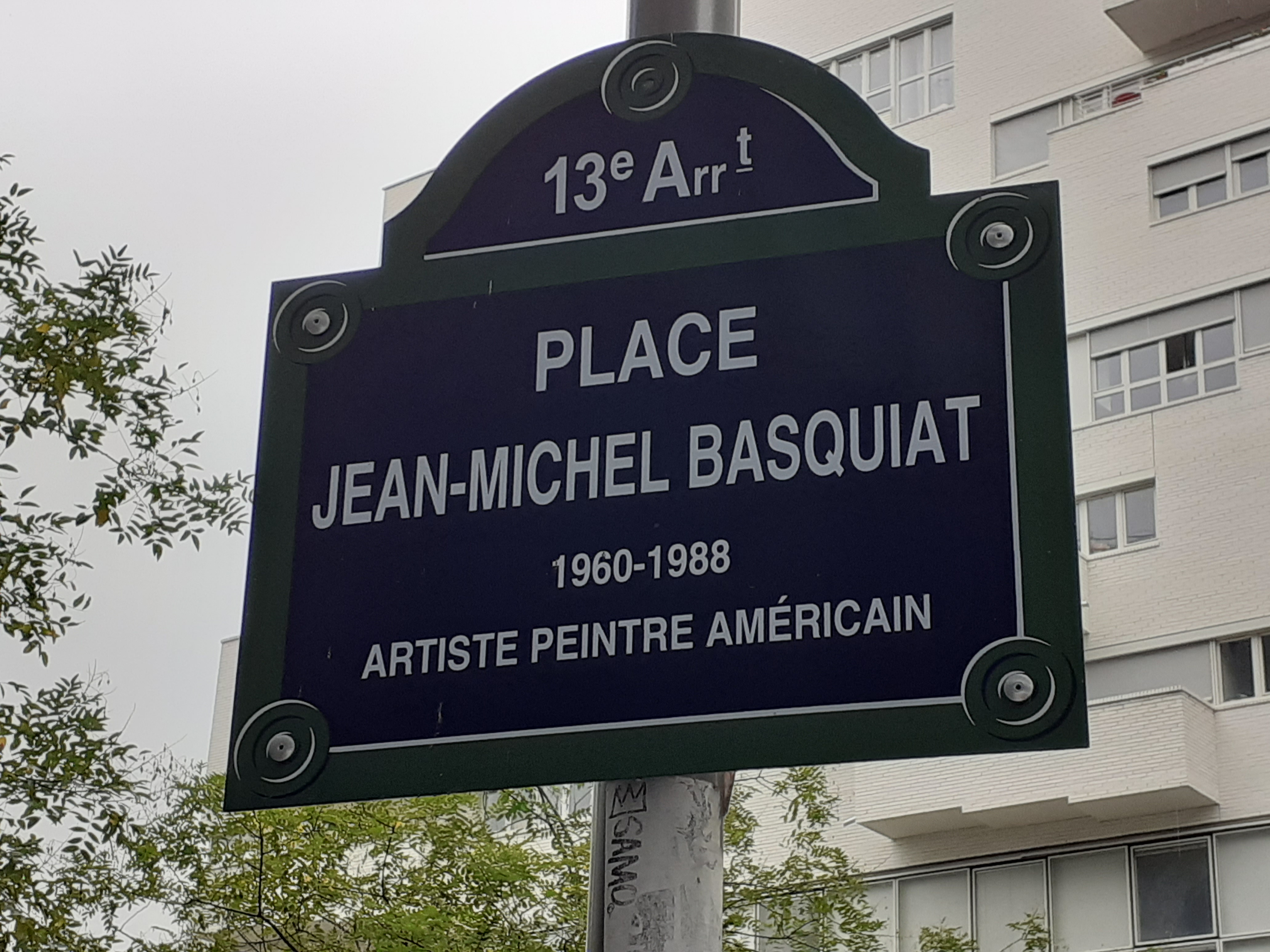
- Former name(s): BR/13 way
- Namesake: Jean-Michel Basquiat
- Arrondissement: 13th arrondissement
- Coordinates: 48.8314°N 2.3757°E

Construction
- Inauguration: September 29, 2018

The Place Jean-Michel Basquiat is a public square located in the 13th arrondissement of Paris. It is named after American artist Jean-Michel Basquiat, who emerged from the New York graffiti scene in the late 1970s before becoming the leading artist of the neo-expressionism movement of the 1980s.

== History ==
This road was created on land belonging to SNCF as part of the development of the ZAC Paris Rive Gauche under the provisional name of BR/13 way.

In June 2014, the Council of Paris approved a proposal from Jérôme Coumet, mayor of the 13th arrondissement, to name a square after Jean-Michel Basquiat. The site was under construction at the time. The 13th arrondissement already has a number of streets named after artists, such as the Rue Paul Klee and the Rue Marcel Duchamp. "Basquiat is one of the biggest contemporary artists," Coumet told Le Figaro. "He defended the cause of African-Americans in the US, and was also a lover of France. He was the artist who blazed the trail for street art, and art in public space." The 13th arrondissement had become a destination for street art particularly Tower 13, which Coumet invited "well known urban artists to create a collective open air museum" before its demolition in 2014.

On September 29, 2018, Basquiat's family was present for the official inauguration by the mayor of Paris Anne Hidalgo, the mayor of the 13th arrondissement Jérôme Coumet, designer Agnès b., and deputy mayor Christophe Girard.

== Shops and restaurants ==
- Paris 13, la guinguette EP7
- Agnès b
