= Art collection of David Bowie =

Private collection of artworks

David Bowie (1947–2016) owned an extensive private art collection which included paintings, sculpture and furniture. He started collecting art in the mid-1970s and continued through the end of his life. His collection included paintings that he himself painted.

== Bowie as an art collector and supporter of art ==
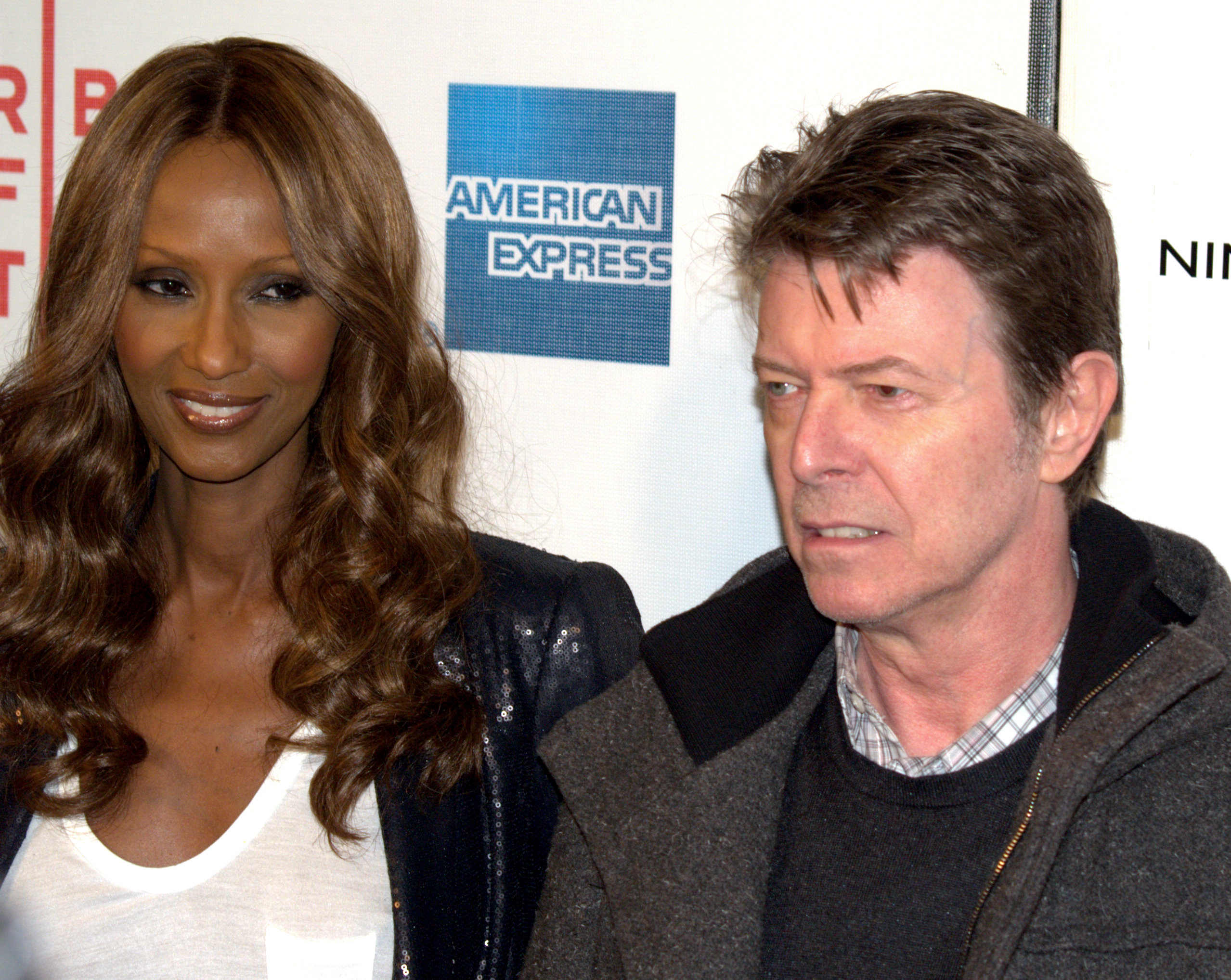
David Bowie and wife Iman in 2009

Bowie reportedly began appreciating and collecting art in the mid 1970s, when he moved to Berlin to escape his cocaine addiction. In 1987, he said he'd stopped collecting art for a while, saying "I used to, when it was worth collecting. ... I don't like the idea of buying art at ridiculous prices. I actually used to prefer to go around to shops and find bits and things. I mean, I got a great collection of German expressionist wood block prints, but I got them ten years ago, before German expressionism became fashionable."

Artist and writer Matthew Collings characterized the collection as "bohemian, romantic, expressive, emotional art". Bowie was described by an art advisor as "a true collector. His acquisitions were not commercially motivated; he cared about the art, not the market. His was a deeply personal, eclectic collection, reflecting his British roots and his real passion for art." He was frequently featured in ARTnews' "Top 200 collectors" lists. Bowie's collection of contemporary African Art, was described as "[demonstrating] an appreciation that goes far beyond the all-too-frequent exoticism and 'othering' of art from the continent." In 1995, Bowie pushed for an exhibition of South African art, and he wrote about the 1995 Johannesburg Biennale for the magazine Modern Painters. By 1998, Bowie was a board member of Modern Painters, and he participated in the Nat Tate art hoax.

Bowie would also attend gallery openings, often with his wife Iman, such as in 1999 when visiting an opening with artist Damian Loeb, or at New York's Gagosian Gallery in early 1995.

Bowie wrote songs about art and artists throughout his career, referencing or naming artists including: "Andy Warhol" (1971); Jean Genet, whose name inspired the name of the song "The Jean Genie" (1972) and whose themes of outsider identity influenced much of his work; Bob Dylan in "Song for Bob Dylan" (1971); and Chris Burden, whose art inspired the song "Joe the Lion" (1977). His album 1. Outside (1995), whose name was inspired by Outsider art, includes the song "Thru These Architects Eyes", which names architects Philip Johnson and Richard Rogers. Bowie's friend and collaborator Iggy Pop is also the indirect subject of several of Bowie's songs, and was one of the inspirations for Bowie's Ziggy Stardust on-stage persona's name.

== Notable artists and works in the collection ==
"Art was, seriously, the only thing I’d ever wanted to own."

— David Bowie to The New York Times in 1998

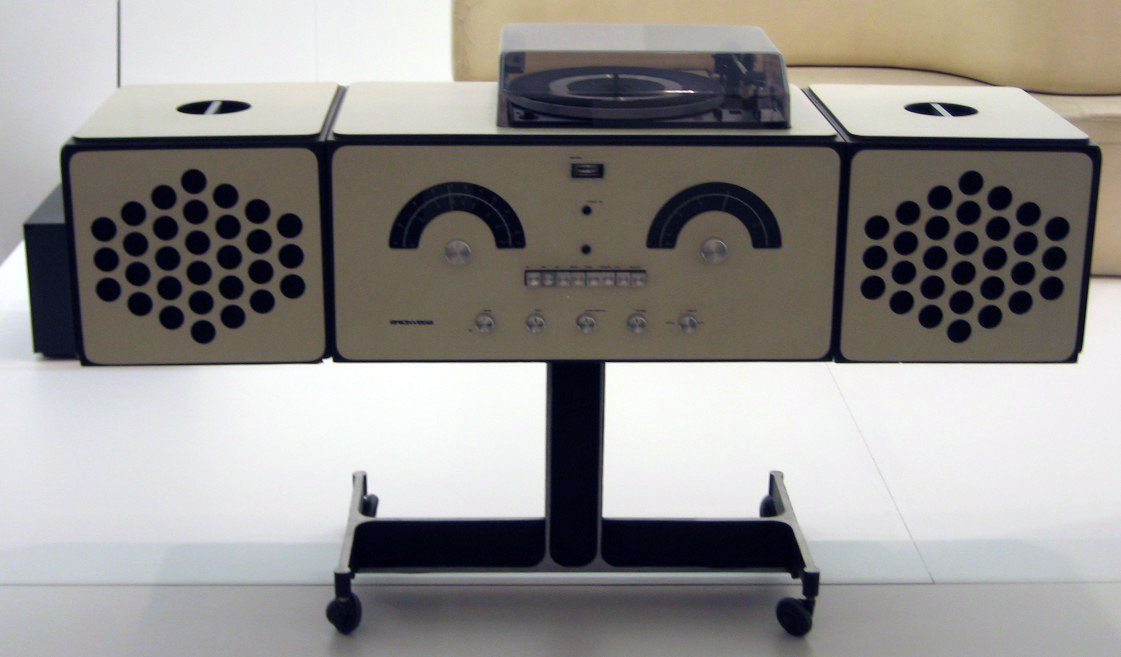
A 1966 Brionvega RR 126 radiogram, similar to the one in Bowie's collection

"The only thing I buy obsessively and addictively is art."

— David Bowie to the BBC in 1999

Notable artists included in Bowie's collection included:

- Outsider art from the Gugging Group
- Frank Auerbach - 1965 Head of Gerda Boehm (l.)
- Jean-Michel Basquiat - 1984 Air Power
- David Bomberg
- Achille Castiglioni and Pier Giacomo Castiglioni - 1960s Brionvega RR 126 radiogram
- Patrick Caulfield
- Marcel Duchamp - 1964 A Bruit Secret
- Harold Gilman - A London Interior
- Romuald Hazoumè
- Erich Heckel
- Gertrude Hermes
- Damien Hirst
- Ivon Hitchens
- Peter Howson
- Leon Kossoff
- Peter Lanyon
- Wyndham Lewis
- Memphis Milano
- Henry Moore
- Odd Nerdrum
- Winifred Nicholson
- Méret Oppenheim
- Francis Picabia
- Peter Paul Rubens
- Egon Schiele
- William Scott
- Ettore Sottsass
- Stanley Spencer
- Graham Sutherland
- Tintoretto - Altarpiece of Saint Catherine
- William Turnbull
- Euan Uglow
- John Virtue
- Jack Butler Yeats

Basquiat's Air Power, estimated at US $3.5 million to be the most expensive single piece of art in Bowie's collection, sold for $8.8 million in 2016.

== Bowie's own art ==
Bowie himself was a painter and sculptor, and works by his own hand are part of his collection. This includes a series of self-portraits he painted in 1995, one of which he used as the cover to his album Outside.

In 1995, he called himself "a hardened old expressionist. That's the period that I adore. I guess I just feel comfortable painting within that genre." He often contributed his artwork to auctions, such as when he donated two pieces to the 'Twice Gifted' auction in 1990, and he reportedly sold another piece for $500 in late 1990 at a different showing.

== Art sales ==
=== 2016 auction ===
"David’s art collection was fuelled by personal interest and compiled out of passion. He always sought and encouraged loans from the collection and enjoyed sharing the works in his custody. Though his family are keeping certain pieces of particular personal significance, it is now time to give others the opportunity to appreciate – and acquire – the art and objects he so admired."

— A statement from Bowie's family about the auction

Around 350 pieces of art from Bowie's collection were put up for auction in November 2016. None of Bowie's own art was part of the auction, and the proceeds from the sale went to Bowie's family. An estimate by Sotheby's auction house estimated the value of the collection for sale at around US $13 million. Prior to the auction, some of the pieces were shown in Los Angeles, New York and Hong Kong. The pieces up for auction represented about two-thirds of Bowie's entire art collection.

Bowie's family sold the collection because they "didn't have the space" to store it.

The auction exceeded expectations, and the entire collection was sold over two days for £32.9 million (app. $41.5 million), while the highest-selling item was Jean-Michel Basquiat’s graffiti-inspired painting Air Power, sold for £7.09 million. Exhibitions of the works in London alone attracted over 51,000 visitors, the highest attendance for any pre-sale exhibition in London. The auctions themselves were attended by 1,750 bidders, with over 1,000 more bidding online.

=== 2018 auction ===
Tintoretto's altarpiece, which was one of Bowie's earliest art acquisitions back in 1987, was sold for £191,000 to a collector who returned the piece to Tintoretto's native Venice.

=== 2021 auction ===
In the mid- to late-1990s, Bowie painted a series of paintings entitled "DHead", typically followed by a roman numeral. These paintings were often of friends, bandmates, and self-portraits. One such DHead was used as the album cover for his 1995 album Outside. In June 2021, "DHead XLVI" was put up for auction by a Canadian company, and fetched a price of CA$108,120 (or roughly US$87,800).

=== 2025 auction ===
An unnamed Basquiat piece which Bowie had bought in 1995 for over $90,000 was sold at auction in May 2025 for US$6,500,000.

== See also ==
- David Bowie Is

=== References ===
- Buckley, David (1999). Strange Fascination – David Bowie: The Definitive Story. London: Virgin Books. ISBN 978-1-85227-784-0.
- Carr, Roy; Murray, Charles Shaar (1981). Bowie: An Illustrated Record. Eel Pie Pub. ISBN 978-0-38077-966-6.
- Sandford, Christopher (1997) [1996]. Bowie: Loving the Alien. Time Warner. ISBN 0-306-80854-4.
- Pegg, Nicholas (2016). The Complete David Bowie (Revised and Updated ed.). London: Titan Books. ISBN 978-1-78565-365-0.
