= Halim Flowers =

American visual artist (born 1980)

- Born: September 1, 1980 (age 45); Washington, D.C., U.S.
- Known for: Visual art
- Movement: Street art, optical improvisation

Halim Flowers (born September 1, 1980) is an American artist and writer. He began painting after serving more than twenty years in prison for a felony murder he was convicted of as a teenager. He was released from prison pursuant to the Incarceration Reduction Amendment Act, which offered clemency for juvenile offenders given life sentences, and now publishes and displays his artwork around the world.

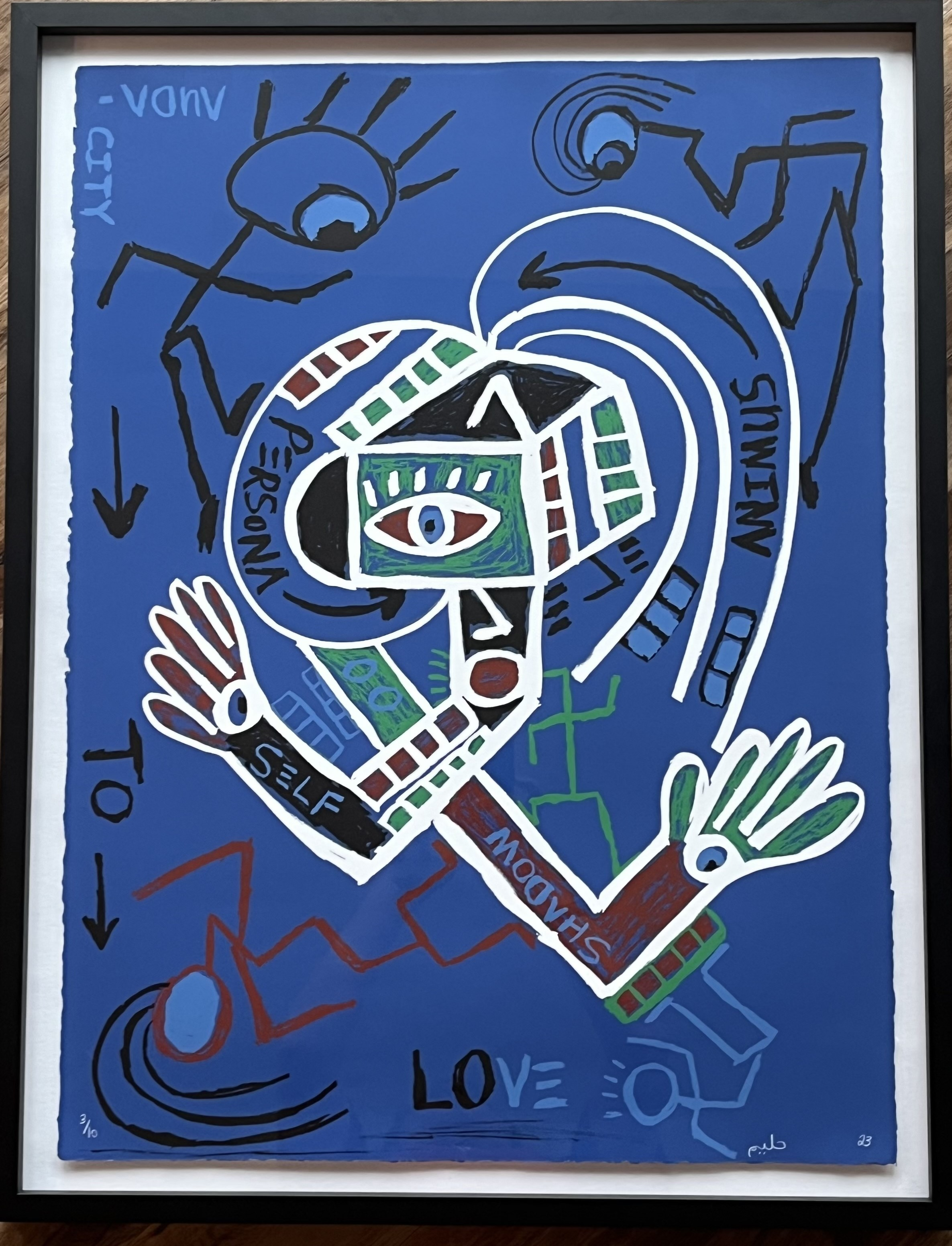
Silkscreen print of "Audacity to Love (IP) (Blue)" by Flowers

== Biography ==
Flowers was born in Washington, D.C., on September 1, 1980, and grew up in the midst of the crack epidemic. At the age of 16, Flowers was charged with felony murder when an accomplice killed a man during a home invasion. He was sentenced to two life terms. During his incarceration, Flowers was featured in the Emmy-award-winning documentary America Undercover: Thug Life in DC.

After serving more than twenty years, Flowers was released from prison pursuant to statutory reforms aimed at offenders who received life sentences for crimes committed as juveniles. Shortly after his release, he received fellowship awards from Halcyon Arts Lab and Echoing Green to explore using art to change narratives around mass incarceration. He redesigned the logo for the Phillips Collection in Washington, D.C., in celebration of that museum's centennial, and estimated that he had sold $1 million worth of art in 2021 alone. Within five years of his release from prison, his paintings were displayed in galleries around the world, including Paris, France, Washington, DC, Houston, Palm Beach, Florida, Dubai, and MoMA PS1 in Queens, New York, along with residencies in Barcelona and Los Angeles.

== Art ==
Flowers views his painting as a means of changing narratives around mass incarceration. Many of Flowers' works center around the theme of a "superpredator", which was how Flowers was labeled during his time behind bars. Another common theme is "Love is ...", a phrase that repeatedly occurs in his work, including in the title of his book Love is the Vaccine.

Though largely self-taught, his work has been described as influenced by Jean-Michel Basquiat, "with a touch of abstract expressionism included for good measure." Flowers has also cited George Condo, Mark Bradford, and Cecily Brown as significant influences. He describes his own style as "optical improvisation".

== Selected works ==
- 2024: Audacity to Love
- 2024: Struttura dell’Amore
- 2023: $uperpredator at MFAH
- 2023: Love is the Re-soul-u-tion
- 2022: Man Date
- 2021: Superpredator Loves Agape
- 2020: Dichotomy's Dialectic Dissected
