= Boy and Dog in a Johnnypump =

1982 painting by Jean-Michel Basquiat

- Artist: Jean-Michel Basquiat
- Year: 1982
- Medium: Oil on canvas
- Movement: Neo-expressionism
- Dimensions: 240 cm × 420 cm (96 in × 164 in)
- Location: Hirshhorn Museum and Sculpture Garden
- Owner: Ken Griffin

Boy and Dog in a Johnnypump is a painting created by American artist Jean-Michel Basquiat in 1982. The artwork, which depicts a boy with a dog, is among the most expensive paintings ever purchased. It was purchased for over $100 million in 2020, becoming Basquiat's second most expensive painting following Untitled (1982), which was sold for $110.5 million in 2017.

== History ==
Boy and Dog in a Johnnypump was executed by Jean-Michel Basquiat in 1982, which is considered his landmark year. Reflecting on that period in an interview with The New York Times in 1985, Basquiat said: "I had some money, I made the best paintings ever." Measuring at nearly 14 feet wide and 8 feet high, the painting depicts a skeletal black boy and dog painted in similar style. The figures occupy the center of the canvas in the spray of an open fire hydrant. Johnny pump is a New York slang term for a fire hydrant that is open in the summer for kids to play in the water. The warm colors suggest a "blazing hot summer landscape."

In June 2020, it was reported that American businessman and art collector Ken Griffin purchased the painting for more than $100 million from American businessman and art collector Peter Brant. Brant's Basquiat collection was exhibited in 2019 at the Brant Foundation in New York. The sale was reportedly finalized before the COVID-19 pandemic earlier that year. A spokesman for Citadel, Griffin's investment firm, released a statement that "the vast majority of Ken's art collection is on display at museums for the public to enjoy. He intends to share this piece as well."

In 2017, well-known British street artist Banksy created a tribute piece for Basquiat's Boy and Dog in a Johnnypump, which is permanently installed outside of the Barbican Centre in London and entitled Portrait of Basquiat being welcomed by the Metropolitan police.

== Exhibitions ==
Ken Griffin, who is a trustee and financial benefactor of the Art Institute of Chicago, loaned Boy and Dog in a Johnnypump to the museum in July 2020.

Griffin removed the painting from The Art Institute of Chicago when he moved to Palm Beach in 2022.

The painting was on display at the Hirshhorn Museum in Washington, D.C., from September 29, 2024, to October 26, 2025, alongside Banksy's homage to the piece called Banksquiat. Boy and Dog in Stop and Search.

The painting had previously been exhibited at the following art institutions:

- Jean-Michel Basquiat at Serpentine Gallery in London, March–April 1996.
- Basquiat at Musée d'Art Moderne de la Ville de Paris, October 2010 – January 2011.
- Brant Foundation in New York, March–May 2019.

== See also ==
- List of paintings by Jean-Michel Basquiat
- List of most expensive paintings
- 1982 in art
