= A Panel of Experts =

1982 painting by Jean-Michel Basquiat

- Artist: Jean-Michel Basquiat
- Year: 1982
- Medium: Acrylic, oilstick and paper collage on canvas with exposed wood supports and twine
- Movement: Neo-expressionism
- Dimensions: 150 cm × 150 cm (60 in × 60 in)
- Location: Montreal Museum of Fine Arts, Montreal Gift of Ira Young

A Panel of Experts is a painting created by American artist Jean-Michel Basquiat in 1982. The artwork depicts, in part, a catfight between two of his lovers, Suzanne Mallouk and singer Madonna. The painting has been part of several exhibitons, and is in the collection of Montreal Museum of Fine Arts in Montreal.

== Background ==
In 1981, artist Jean-Michel Basquiat began dating Suzanne Mallouk, a waitress and aspiring artist he met at Night Birds bar in Manhattan's East Village. He moved in with her, and she paid the rent while he focused on painting. That same year, he transitioned from a street artist to exhibiting his artwork in galleries. They moved into a loft provided by gallerist Annina Nosei on Crosby Street in SoHo in early 1982; Mallouk moved out of the loft a few months later. They dated on-and-off until 1983.

In 1982, Basquiat began dating up-and-coming singer Madonna Ciccone. According to music video director Ed Steinberg, who worked on the video for Madonna's debut single "Everybody," he arranged for them to meet at his place after Madonna spotted Basquiat at Lucky Strike nightclub. However, Basquiat's former Gray bandmate Nick Taylor stated that he introduced them during Retro Night at Bowlmor Lanes. Soon after meeting, Madonna moved into Basquiat's Crosby Street loft where she worked on her debut album Madonna (1983). Basquiat and Madonna frequented downtown nightclubs and were photographed together for the article "Clubs: Action Packed" in GQ magazine (March 1983) and a Scull Limousine advertisement in the "Late Night New York" section of Interview magazine (July 1983).

One night while Basquiat and Madonna were at The Roxy nightclub in Chelsea, Mallouk spotted them and attacked Madonna in a jealous rage. Mallouk also made a bonfire of Basquiat's paintings outside his loft. After Madonna broke up with Basquiat in 1983, he demanded that she return the paintings he had given her, and then he covered them in black paint.

== Analysis ==
A Panel of Experts is painted on stretched canvas. The canvas is on the base of a handmade structure; tied pieces of wood with twine. Basquiat drew some images and painted the background black, which overlaps some of the images. This creates a strong contrast and draws attention to the text and imagery.

The top left side has "VENUS" written with "MADONNA©" crossed out underneath. Basquiat referred to Suzanne Mallouk as "Venus" in his paintings. He crossed out words to bring more attention to them. "I cross out words so you will see them more; the fact that they are obscured makes you want to read them," he said. The copyright symbol next to Madonna's name suggests his awareness of her impending fame. Basquiat told his art dealer Larry Gagosian that "she'll be the biggest pop star in the world." There is humor in the painting with Basquiat depicting the catfight between Mallouk and Madonna as stick figures. According to Mallouk, Basquiat told her that she won the fight which is why he crossed out Madonna's name, adding she "beat her up just like a Puerto Rican girl."

Growing up Basquiat wanted to be a cartoonist. In this painting he incorporates and repurposes cartoon images. Below the fight, there is a superman-like figure accompanied by the word "KRAK," relating to the comic book-style of adding onomatopoeic sound effects. The phrase "SATURDAY MORNING CARTOON" is written on the top right of the painting. On the bottom of the painting, text relating to Saturday morning cartoons are written such as "SUGAR COATED CORN PUFFS," "MILK" and "SUGAR." Basquiat's crown motif which appears frequently in his early work is also present twice.

== Exhibitions ==
A Panel of Experts was created for Basquiat's solo exhibition at the Fun Gallery in New York in November 1982.

In 2016, A Panel of Experts was displayed at the Vancouver Art Gallery as part of MashUp: The Birth of Modern Culture.

From September 2017 to January 2018, it was exhibited at the Barbican Centre in London as part of Basquiat: Boom for Real. Madonna, who was Basquiat's date for his Fun Gallery exhibition opening in 1982, visited the Barbican and took a photo in front of the painting in October 2017.

The painting was part of the exhibition Seeing Loud: Basquiat and Music at the Montreal Museum of Fine Arts in Montreal from October 2022 to February 2023. It was then loaned for the exhibition Basquiat Soundtracks at the Philharmonie de Paris in Paris from April to July 2023.

== Collection ==
The painting is part of the permanent collection at the Montreal Museum of Fine Arts in Montreal.

== See also ==
- List of paintings by Jean-Michel Basquiat
- Animation in the United States in the television era
- 1982 in art
