= A Pile of Crowns for Jean-Michel Basquiat =

1988 painting by Keith Haring

- Artist: Keith Haring
- Year: 1988
- Medium: Acrylic on canvas
- Movement: Pop art
- Dimensions: 270 cm × 300 cm (108 in × 120 in)
- Owner: The Keith Haring Foundation

A Pile of Crowns for Jean-Michel Basquiat is a 1988 painting created by American artist Keith Haring. The artwork was made to memorialize his friend, artist Jean-Michel Basquiat. It depicts a towering pile of Basquiat's trademark crowns.

== History ==
Haring moved to New York City from Kutztown in 1978 to study painting at the School of Visual Arts. He became immersed in the art scene of the East Village and befriended Brooklyn native Jean-Michel Basquiat. Before becoming a leading artist in the neo-expressionism movement, Basquiat started out doing street art in lower Manhattan as SAMO. In 1989, Haring told Rolling Stone: "Before I knew who he was, I became obsessed with Jean-Michel Basquiat's work." He added, "The stuff I saw on the walls was more poetry than graffiti. They were sort of philosophical poems that would use the language the way Burroughs did – in that it seemed like it could mean something other than what it was. On the surface they seemed really simple, but the minute I saw them I knew that they were more than that. From the beginning he was my favorite artist."

Haring was inspired, and he also took to the streets, where he became popular for his New York City Subway drawings. By 1983, Basquiat and Haring both had established gallery representation in the United States and Europe. They had also become friends with their idol, pop artist Andy Warhol. Although Haring and Basquiat never collaborated, they remained close friends.

Following Basquiat's death from a heroin overdose on August 12, 1988, Haring wrote his obituary for Vogue and created A Pile of Crowns for Jean-Michel Basquiat in tribute.

Haring was diagnosed with HIV/AIDS that year. He died on February 16, 1990, of AIDS-related complications.

A Pile of Crowns for Jean-Michel Basquiat was painted on a triangular canvas, like a warning sign, edged with a red outline. In the center is a towering pile of black and white crowns on the ground glistening triumphantly. The three-pointed crown was Basquiat's signature artistic motif. It appears so often in his artwork that it has become a recognizable symbol in popular culture. On the bottom right corner is a copyright symbol, which was one of Basquiat's signature symbols. Haring also used the triangle style motif in his limited edition screenprint run Silence = Death, released in 1989, which aimed to raise awareness of the HIV/AIDS pandemic of the time.

== Exhibitions ==
- The Political Line at de Young museum in San Francisco, November 2014–February 2015
- Crossing Lines at National Gallery of Victoria in Melbourne, December 2019–March 2020
