= Paige Powell =

American photographer

Paige Powell (born 1950) is an American photographer, curator, art consultant, and animal rights activist. After serving as public affairs director of the Portland Zoo, she moved to New York City in 1980 and later worked at Interview magazine from 1981 to 1994, rising from advertising sales to associate publisher. Through her involvement with the Factory, she became a close friend of Pop artist Andy Warhol, immersing herself in New York City's downtown art scene and documenting it through photography. Since returning to her native Portland in 1994, Powell has focused on curatorial projects and animal welfare advocacy.

== Life and career ==
=== Early life and career beginnings ===
Powell was raised Southwest Portland, Oregon, the daughter of the founding partner of a successful insurance agency. Powell volunteered at Portland Zoo, teaching chimpanzees sign language and playing with them as part of the chimpanzee enrichment program, before she became the public affairs director at the zoo. She studied art in Greece before working at Blue Ribbon Sports.

=== Life and career in New York ===
Powell moved to New York City in December 1980. She wanted to work for either film director Woody Allen in a production role or pop artist Andy Warhol at Interview magazine. "I approached both, and was offered two jobs, but it just so happened that the one at Interview, selling advertising, started first," she said. In 1981 Powell began working at Interview and was eventually promoted to the position of associate publisher. She became a regular at Warhol's Factory whilst also working part-time as a freelance photojournalist for the Japanese magazine Brutus.

In April 1983, Powell held an exhibition with Jean-Michel Basquiat as the main artist. "I had some friends who had an apartment in New York but they were living in Geneva, so there was basically no furniture, and I asked if I could do a show in the apartment. My boyfriend at the time was one of Andy's technical assistants and he thought I should really get Jean-Michel [for the exhibition]," she recalled. Graffiti artists Rammellzee, A-One, Lady Pink, Kool Koor, and Toxic were also included in the show. Powell sold some of Basquiat's paintings and eventually they began dating. Through their relationship, Basquiat and Warhol became close friends. In August 1983, Basquiat moved into a loft that Warhol owned on Great Jones Street in NoHo, and soon they began collaborating.

Powell's first exhibition was presented in January 1984 at the East Village bar Beulah Land, where she filled the walls with her photographs of Warhol, Factory members, and an evolving circle of artists, musicians, and downtown nightlife figures.

Although Powell and Basquiat ended their on-and-off romantic relationship in 1985, she remained close to Warhol, and they were constant companions until his death in February 1987. "We were attached like mittens.... we lived eight blocks from one another, we worked together and partied together. We ate the same macrobiotic food, had the same Japanese masseuse, used the same Olympus camera, and even had the same haircut for a while." They had discussed adopting a child together, and Warhol wanted to work with her directly on commissioned projects. At Warhol's burial, Powell placed copies of the February and March issues of Interview and a bottle of Beautiful Eau de Parfum by Estée Lauder into his grave.

Powell was an early adopter of camcorder technology and often filmed her friends. She forged friendships with creatives such as artist Francesco Clemente, novelist Tama Janowitz, and fashion designer Stephen Sprouse among others. Powell was instrumental in launching the career of Mexican artist Julio Galán. She organized two shows for the artist in New York City.

While working at Interview, Powell and Janowitz developed a Manhattan public-access television program called It's a Dog's Life, profiling adoptable animals in half-hour segments.

=== Return to Portland ===
Following her return to Portland in 1994, Powell has split her time between working for non-profit animal-protection organizations and as a curator and art consultant. In 1999, Powell founded the Pearl Arts Foundation with developer Homer Williams, becoming its executive director. The Pearl Arts Foundation was dissolved in 2003.

In 2001, Powell and her friend Kim Singer were sued by John Lindberg over the kidnapping of a boxer named Shaq which they believed was being neglected. After they took the dog, he developed an intestinal ailment and was euthanized when no one volunteered to pay for an operation. Powell was unaware that the dogs were euthanized until afterward.

Powell curated the art collection for The Nines hotel in Portland. Her clients also include The Lexington Hotel NYC, The Baronette Renaissance Detroit-Novi Hotel, JW Marriott Denver Cheery Creek, and the Renaissance Pittsburgh Hotel.

Powell was instrumental in mounting a retrospective exhibition of the work of Stephen Sprouse at Deitch Projects in 2009, via her friend curator Jeffrey Deitch.

Powell documented the rising careers of her friends, musician Thomas Lauderdale of Pink Martini and filmmaker Gus Van Sant. Lauderdale encouraged Powell to go through her archive of 1980s photographs and to start showing them to the public. In 2014, she had an exhibition, Jean-Michel Basquiat, Reclining Nude, at the Suzanne Geiss Gallery in New York. Basquiat's estate opposed publishing the intimate photos, which depict Basquiat nude.

In 2019, Powell collaborated with Gucci for a series of installations of her photographs called Beulah Land, which was named after the bar in Manhattan where Powell covered the walls in photos of her "non-biological family." It was first displayed at Gucci on Wooster Street in New York and then Dover Street Market in Ginza, Tokyo, and London. Coinciding with the installation, a three-book set was published celebrating Powell's images of culture, art, and nightlife in 1980s New York.

Claire Forlani as Gina Cardinale in the Julian Schnabel film Basquiat (1996) is a composite character of Basquiat's girlfriends, including Powell. Powell appeared in the documentary film Basquiat: Rage to Riches (2017) and in the Netflix docuseries The Andy Warhol Diaries (2022).

In 2026, Powell’s exhibition Private Andy: Religious Services was shown at Jeffrey Deitch Gallery in Los Angeles. It featured a 1986 series of Andy Warhol volunteering at a Bronx church during the holidays, along with accidental double-exposure photographs taken over a 10-day period in February 1987.

== Exhibitions ==
- Jean-Michel Basquiat, Reclining Nude, Suzanne Geiss Company, New York, Jan 16–Feb 22, 2014.
- Paige Powell: The Ride, Portland Art Museum, Portland, Nov 5, 2015–April 3, 2016.
- (Self), Douglas F. Cooley Memorial Art Gallery, Portland, August 29–October 1, 2017.
- Beulah Land, Gucci Wooster in New York, April 17–May, 17 2019.
- Beulah Land, Dover Street Market, Tokyo, September 7–September 26, 2019.
- Beulah Land London, Dover Street Market, London, November 6–November 21, 2019.
- Private Andy: Religious Services, Jeffrey Deitch Gallery, Los Angeles, February 20–April 4, 2026.
