= Tiffany Blue =

Color

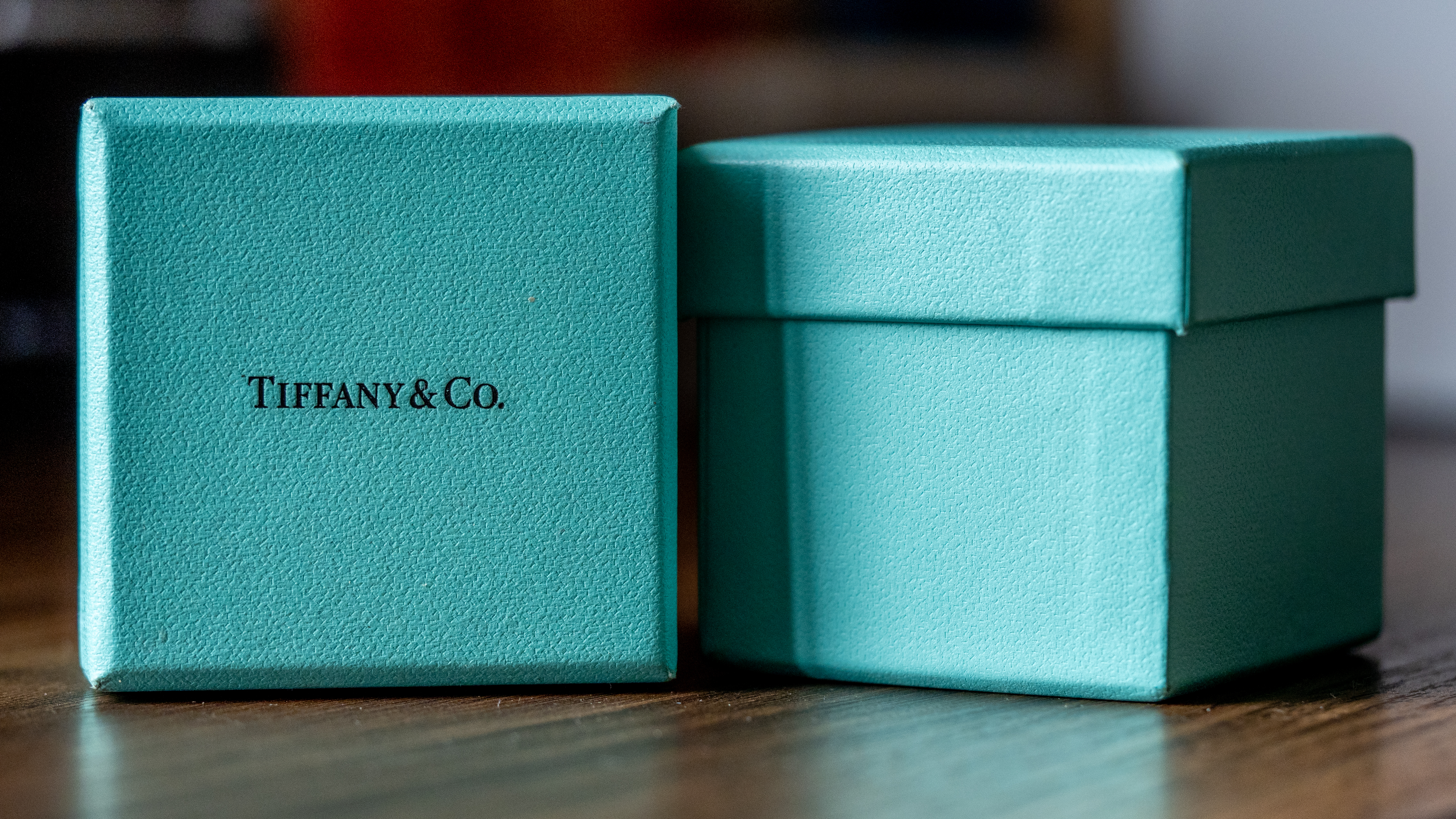
- Tiffany & Co. gift boxes

Color coordinates
- Hex triplet: #81D8D0
- sRGB^{B} (r, g, b): (129, 216, 208)
- HSV (h, s, v): (174°, 40%, 85%)
- CIELCh_{uv} (L, C, h): (81, 40, 183°)
- Source: Tiffany Blue
- ISCC–NBS descriptor: Very light bluish green
- B: Normalized to [0–255] (byte)

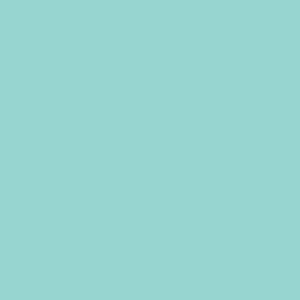

Tiffany Blue is the colloquial name for the light medium robin egg blue color associated with Tiffany & Co., the New York City jewelry company created by Charles Tiffany and John Young in 1837. The cyan color was used on the cover of Tiffany's Blue Book, first published in 1845. Since then, Tiffany & Co. has used the color extensively on promotional materials like boxes and bags.

Since 1998, the Tiffany Blue color has been registered as a color trademark by Tiffany & Co. It is produced as a private custom color by Pantone, with PMS number 1837, the number deriving from the year of Tiffany's foundation.

== See also ==
- Lists of colors
