= Bruno Bischofberger =

Swiss art dealer (1940–2026)

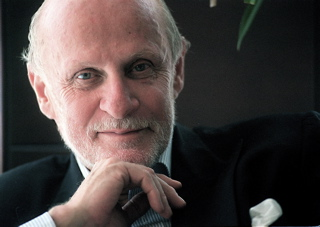
- Born: 1 January 1940; Zürich, Switzerland
- Died: 9 May 2026 (aged 86); Zürich, Switzerland
- Occupations: Art dealer; collector

Bruno Franz Bischofberger (1 January 1940 – 9 May 2026) was a Swiss art dealer and collector.

== Background ==
Bruno Bischofberger was born in Zürich, Switzerland, in 1940. He studied art history, archaeology, and ethnography (folk art) at the University of Zurich, with further studies at the universities of Bonn and Munich. Bischofberger had three daughters and a son and lived near Zurich with his wife, Christina, known as Yoyo, in a house designed by Ettore Sottsass overlooking Lake Zurich. Bischofberger died in Zürich on 9 May 2026, at the age of 86.

== Gallery ==
Bischofberger opened his first gallery in 1963 on Pelikanstrasse in Zürich, then under the name City-Galerie. In 1965, he hosted his first exhibition of Pop Art at the gallery with works by Roy Lichtenstein, Robert Rauschenberg, Andy Warhol, Tom Wesselmann, Claes Oldenburg, and Jasper Johns. In the 1970s, Bischofberger continued to showcase American Pop Art along with proponents of Minimalism, Land Art and Conceptual Art, such as Sol Le Witt, Donald Judd, Dan Flavin, Bruce Nauman, Joseph Kosuth, and On Kawara, and representatives of Nouveau Réalisme in Paris, such as Yves Klein, Daniel Spoerri, and Jean Tinguely. Between 1982 and 2005, a three-volume catalogue raisonné of Jean Tinguely's oeuvre was published by Bischofberger's wife, Christina. In the 1980s, Bischofberger championed key figures of the nascent Neo-Expressionist movements, such as Miquel Barceló, Jean-Michel Basquiat, Mike Bidlo, George Condo, Francesco Clemente, Enzo Cucchi, Dokoupil, Samuel Spieler, Peter Halley, David Salle, and Julian Schnabel.

In 2009 and 2010, Bischofberger's artists from the 1980s were shown at the Bielefeld Kunsthalle in a pair of exhibitions entitled The 80s Revisited – From the Bischofberger Collection I & II. The presentations also included exponents of the Neue Wilde (New Wild Ones) from Berlin, such as Rainer Fetting and Salomé, and the Mülheimer Freiheit around Walter Dahn and Dokoupil. Bischofberger typically maintained close personal relationships with his artists, many of which endured until the end of his life.

In 2013, the gallery relocated from Zurich to the grounds of a former factory in the nearby community of Männedorf, where from 2005 on Bischofberger erected numerous buildings designed by his daughter Nina Bischofberger and her husband Florian Baier. The complex contains the gallery spaces, exhibition and storage areas for the artworks as well as objects from various collections. From the 1980s forward, Bischofberger promoted his exhibitions on the back cover of periodicals such as Artforum and Kunstbulletin. Instead of showing works from the respective exhibitions, the advertisements have featured photographic scenes of traditional Swiss life. In 2018, the artist Peter Fischli joined with Hilar Stadler, curator of the Museum im Bellpark in Kriens, to stage an exhibition dedicated to these back covers.

== Warhol and Basquiat ==
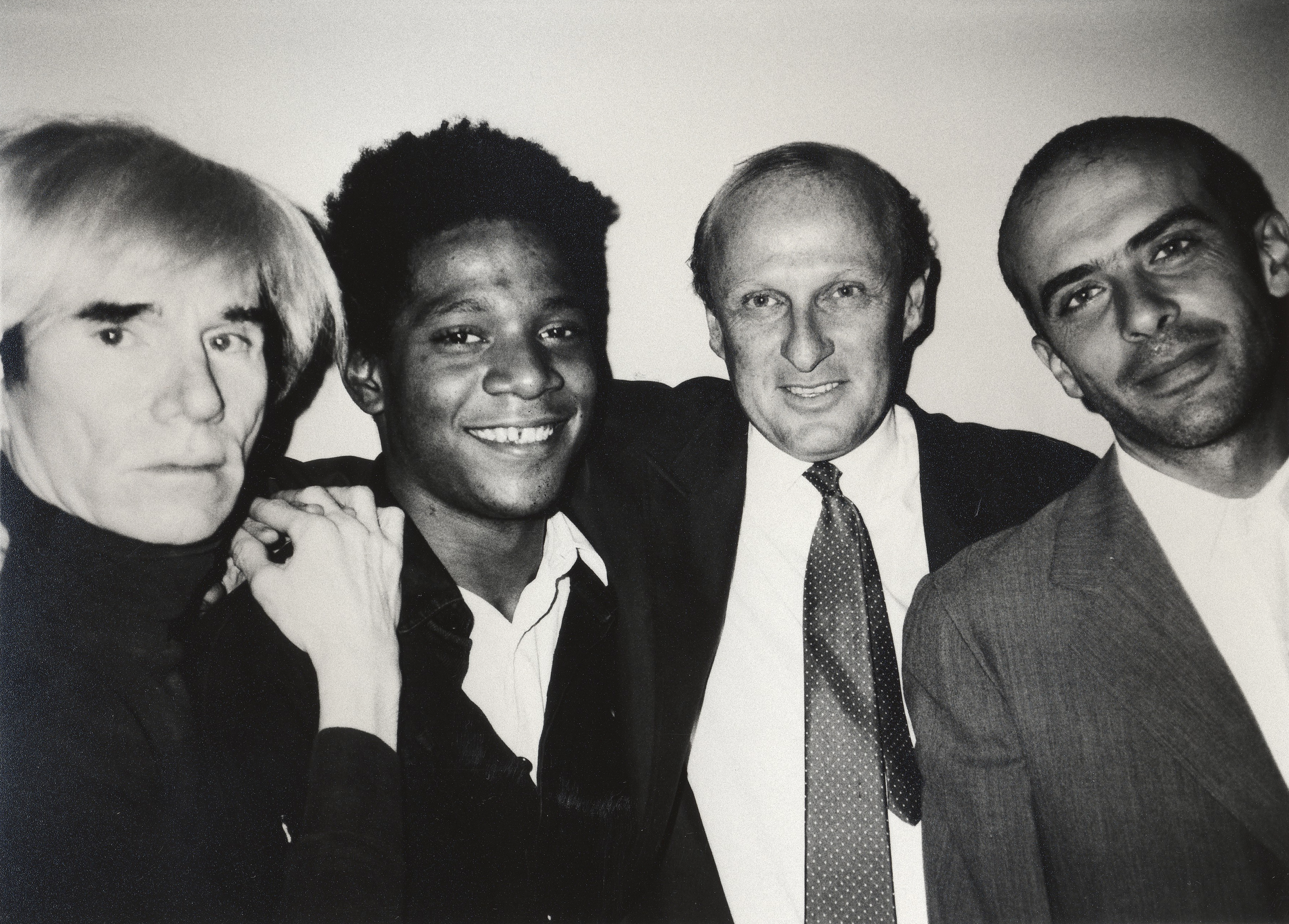
Andy Warhol, Jean-Michel Basquiat, Bischofberger and Francesco Clemente in 1984

Bischofberger is especially well known for his close association with Andy Warhol and Jean-Michel Basquiat. He encountered Warhol for the first time in New York in 1966. During a subsequent meeting in 1968, Warhol showed him a number of early unpublished works. Bischofberger was able to select eleven very significant works, including some hand-painted early pieces such as Superman, Batman, a coloured Coca-Cola painting and several large, often double-panelled Death and Disaster paintings and early portraits dating from 1961 to 1963. Warhol granted Bischofberger the right of first refusal on any future artworks, a commitment that endured until Warhol's death in 1987. Bischofberger travelled several times a year to New York City. In 1970, Warhol painted a portrait of Bischofberger. The latter subsequently proposed a pricing scheme for commissioned portraits with standardised dimensions for clients of the gallery, which would become Warhol's main source of income over the next few years. Bischofberger came across Basquiat's work for the first time in 1981 and one year later became his main art dealer worldwide until the artist's death in 1988. In addition, Bischofberger was responsible for introducing Warhol and Basquiat and later encouraging their collaborations with Francesco Clemente.

Warhol and Basquiat continued to collaborate, with the younger artist persuading Warhol to paint by hand again after having worked exclusively with silk screens for 23 years. Bischofberger had the idea for the artistic collaborations after Basquiat made several drawings together with Bischofberger's then three-year-old daughter Cora on a visit to Switzerland. In 1969, Bischofberger founded Interview magazine together with Warhol.

== Personal collections ==
Privately, Bischofberger and his wife Christina also collected design, photography, folk art, and prehistoric stone art, a collection whose foundation had already been laid by his father. The comprehensive collection of 20th-century international design includes, in addition to furniture, metalwork, jewelry, textiles, and posters, primarily glass and ceramic objects by the leading figures of the most important styles. The glass collection comprises groups of works from Italy, France, Finland, and Sweden, as well as from around the world. Another collection focuses on folk art, primarily from the Alpine countries, Switzerland, Germany, and Austria, and mainly includes furniture, paintings, religious folk art, and everyday objects of the rural population from the 15th to the 19th centuries.

The collection of prehistoric stone art contains axes, vessels, sculptures, and objects from various early cultures around the world. The photography collection includes works since the 1850s to the present: cityscapes and landscapes from the 1850s and 1860s, the estate of Albert Steiner, fashion and advertising photographs by major 20th-century photographers, and a large part of Andy Warhol's photographic work.

The exhibition "Prehistory to the Future – Highlights from the Bischofberger Collection" at the Pinacoteca Giovanni e Marella Agnelli, in Turin, held in 2008, featured selections from his various collections.

== Popular culture ==
In Julian Schnabel's 1996 film Basquiat, Bischofberger was portrayed by Dennis Hopper.

== Publications ==
- "Andy Warhol's Visual Memory" in: Bruno Bischofberger, Andy Warhol's Visual Memory, Edition Galerie Bruno Bischofberger, Zurich, 2001, pp. 9ff.; (in German) Carl Haenlein (ed.), Andy Warhol Fotografien 1976–1987, Kestnergesellschaft, Hannover, 2001, pp. 13ff.
- "A Brief History of My Relationship with Andy Warhol", in: (expanded version for foreword) Bruno Bischofberger, Andy Warhol's Visual Memory, Edition, Galerie Bruno Bischofberger, Zurich, 2001, pp. 6–7; Magnus Bischofberger, Prehistory to the Future: Highlights from the Bischofberger Collection, Electa, Milan, 2008, pp. 258–259
- "Collaborations: Reflections on the Experiences with Basquiat, Clemente and Warhol", in: (edited version) Magnus Bischofberger, Prehistory to the Future: Highlights from the Bischofberger Collection, Electa, Milan, 2008, pp. 262ff.; (unedited version) Tilman Osterwold (ed.), Collaborations: Warhol, Basquiat Clemente, Cantz, Ostfildern-Ruit, 1996, pp. 39ff.
