= Konrad Ross =

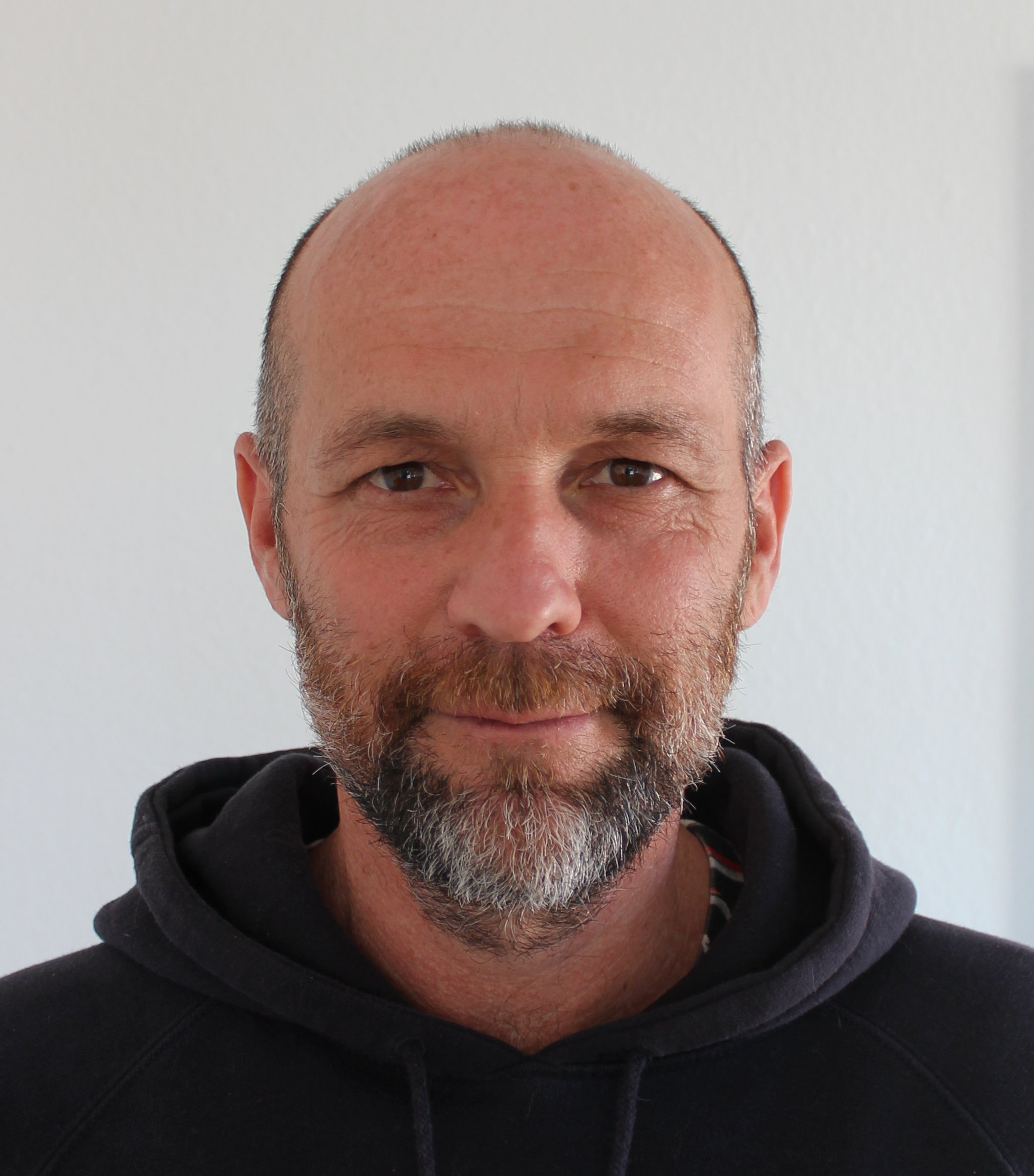
- Konrad Ross
- Born: Konrad Peters; 9 January 1970 (age 55); Johannesburg
- Education: Le Quai Ecole supérieure d'art de Mulhouse and Kunstakademie Düsseldorf
- Known for: Large scale drawings, Painting

Konrad Ross (born 9 January 1970) is a South African born German artist best known for his large scale oil stick drawings on paper. His art is notable for the distortions and imperfections that reveal the creative process. His works frequently incorporate fragments of his own body as motifs. He is also known for using his hands, arms, feet and face in the creation of his works.

== Early life and career ==
Ross was born in South Africa where he attended primary and high school, but moved to Germany with his family at the age of 17, where he completed his secondary schooling. He studied psychology at the University of Texas at Austin for two years, but then moved to France to study art at Le Quai Ecole supérieure d'art de Mulhouse where he received his Diplôme National d'Arts Plastiques in 1996, following which he spent a year as a guest student at the Kunstakademie Düsseldorf. He then started exhibiting, both in solo and group exhibitions in Stockholm, Müllheim, Paris, Metz and Copenhagen. He spent some years in Copenhagen before settling in Germany again.

== Exhibitions ==
Some notable exhibitions by Ross include Let them eat cake (an exhibition and live performance) at the Barlach Halle K in Hamburg, and Mundraub at Gudberg Nerger in 2020.
