= List of Sesame Street international co-production characters =

Sesame Street has many international versions across the world. Each uses some original characters, created specifically to represent their own culture. The following list highlights some of these characters. All characters are Muppets, unless otherwise mentioned.

== Baghch-e-Simsim (Afghanistan) ==
- Zari - A six-year-old girl. Similar role to Big Bird.
- Zeerak Zari's brother.

== Open Sesame (Australia) ==
- Ollie – A yellow orange monster who is a cousin to Elmo.

== Sisimpur (Bangladesh) ==
- Halum: A Bengal tiger. He is the series' equivalent of Big Bird.
- Ikri Mikri: A small blue monster.
- Shiku: A small jackal.
- Tuktuki: A female Muppet.
- Khepu: A purple Grouch that lives in a claypot. He is the series equivalent of Oscar.

== Vila Sésamo 1972 - 1977 and 2007 - 2014 (Brazil) ==
- Garibaldo – A giant, shy, blue bird. In the 1972 version, he was the series' equivalent of Big Bird. Since 2007, he has been replaced with the original yellow Big Bird from the American show even though the name "Garibaldo" is still used but it only serves as translation for the name "Big Bird" rather than the name of a separate character equal in role like it was in the 1970s.
- Gugu – A green Muppet monster with a blue nose and orange cheeks. Similar to Oscar the Grouch. The 2007 series as well as some Portuguese dubs refer to Oscar the Grouch as "Gugu".
- Juca (Armando Bogus) – A toy maker who taught children his craft.
- Ana Maria (Sonia Braga) – A teacher and Juca's cousin.
- Gabriela (Aracy Balabanian) – The wife of Juca
- Funga-Funga – A red Muppet elephant who did not like how others looked at him. He could have originally served as the equivalent to Mr. Snuffleupagus back in the 1972 series though he was not portrayed as an imaginary character. Since 2007, Mr. Snuffleupagus from the American show is referred to as "Funga-Funga" in both the revival and in various Portuguese dubs of Sesame Street.
- Bel – A pink/purple Muppet monster that only appeared in the 2007 version. She is similar to Elmo in appearance, and she is Garibaldo's best friend in the local live-action segments.

== Canadian Sesame Street, later Sesame Park (Canada) ==
- Louis – A French-Canadian otter. While not a "grouch", He fills the role of Oscar the Grouch even though he speaks French rather than English.
- Basil – A polar bear with a naive childlike personality, he is the series' equivalent of Big Bird.
- Dodi – A Muppet who is essentially a Jack-Of-All-Trades, though most commonly known as a bush pilot.
- Katie – A girl who uses a wheelchair.
- Chaos – A cat who speaks in the third person, is similar to Elmo, serving the same role.
- Beau Beaver – A beaver (animated)

== Zhima Jie (China) ==
- Da Niao (大鸟) – This character is the Chinese speaking version of Big Bird, Sources say he is the identical cousin of the American Big Bird in 1998 however in 2010, no mention of him being a cousin is made despite him appearing in both 1998 and 2010 versions.
- Hu Hu Zhu (呼呼猪) – A furry blue pig. Appeared in the 1998 version.
- Xiao Mei Zi (小梅子) – A red Elmo-like monster. Appeared in the 1998 version.
- Lily (丽丽) – A young female tiger cub. Appeared in the 2010 version.

== Alam Simsim (Egypt) ==
- Nimnim – A tall furry green creature with orange legs, having a similar role to Big Bird.
- Filfil – A fuzzy-bearded purple monster who likes to eat 'Asilaya (honey sesame sticks), similar to Cookie Monster.
- Khokha – A furry peach-colored monster who likes to play pretend.
- Am Gherghis – A human who is the local shopkeeper.
- Am Hussein – A human who is a carpenter.
- Ama Kheireya – A human. Also called Um Kareem, she is married to Am Hussein, mother of Mona and Kareem.
- Mona – A human who is the teenage daughter of Kheireya and Hussein.
- Kareem – A human who is the pre-teen brother of Mona.
- Ama Nabila – A human who is the proprietress of the bookstore/library.

== 1, rue Sésame/5, Rue Sésame (France) ==
=== 1, rue Sésame (1978-1982) ===
- Toccata - A naive tall white albatross. He is the series' equivalent of Big Bird.
- Mordicus - An energetic mischievous blue Grouch. He is the series' equivalent of Oscar the Grouch.
- Trepido - An intelligent pink snail. Originally named Subito.

==== Humans in 1, rue Sésame ====
- Roger, played by Roger Elcourt
- Clémence, played by Monique Tarbès
- Odile, played by Edith Garnier
- Maxime, played by Maxime Arcos
- Fabienne, played by Fabienne Dauvin
- Rodrigue, played by Rodrigue Mallet
- Dominé, who is Maxime's father. Played by René Lafleur
- Vendredi, played by Daniel Tarrare
- Marie-Lise, played by Nicole Évans
- Catherine, played by Diane Dalby
- Augustine, played by Caroline Cler

=== 5, Rue Sésame (2005-2007) ===
- Nac - A giant yellow monster who is very similar to Big Bird. Has a similar personality to Big Bird.
- Griotte - A wheelchair-using lavender Anything Muppet. She has a very optimistic personality. Design recycled from Roxie-Marie, with a different hairstyle.
- Yoyo - An anxious tall orange monster who is friendly and loves to make friends. Design recycled from Narf, albeit with live hands.
- Olive - A female green Muppet who is naughty, fearless, and is always laughing.
- Georges the Penguin - A male penguin Muppet with a blue bill, who arrived in an ice cube. Design recycled from Shivers the Penguin.

==== Humans in 5, rue Sésame ====
- Titouan - A retired older dad. Played by Florent Moriniere.
- Baya - The baker on the Street who is optimistic and confident. Played by Myriam Loucif.
- Juliette - A young student who's working at the newsstand. Played by Chloe Stefani.

== Sesamstraße (Germany) ==
- Samson – A male bear, similar in role and full-body puppet, to Big Bird (1978–2008, 2013–present)
- Simson – Samson's cousin and lookalike, often seen with a hat or a tie to distinguish him from Samson (on and off in 1989–1998)
- Tiffy – A pink female bird (1978–2005)
- Finchen – A (former male, now female) snail (recurring appearances from 1983, 1989–present)
- Rumpel – A green Grouch that lives in a rain barrel. He has Gustav, a pet caterpillar, who is based on Oscar's pet worm, Slimey. (1989–2008)
- Buh – A male owl (1989–2002)
- Feli Filu – A blue female monster reporter (2000–2007)
- Pferd – A male horse (2002–present)
- Wolle – A male lamb (2002–present)
- Lena – A pink monster baby (2005–2009)
- Moni – A female photographer (2005–2007)
- Ulli von Bödefeld – An androgyne hedgehog-like creature (1978-early 1986)
- Wolf vom Wortersee – A green wolf (2007–present)

=== Humans in Sesamstraße 1978–1986 ===
- Henning (Henning Venske, a West German actor – 1978–1979) –
- Lilo (Liselotte Pulver, a Swiss actress 1978–1986) –
- Uwe (Uwe Friedrichsen, a West German actor 1979–1982) –
- Horst (Horst Janson, a West German actor 1979–1986) –
- Ute (Ute Willing, a German actress 1979–1986) –
- Ilse (Ilse Biberti, a German actress 1979–1982) –
- Elisabeth (Elisabeth Vitouch, a German actress 1979–1982) –
- Manfred (Manfred Krug, an East German actor – 1982–1986) –

=== Humans in Sesamstraße 1986–present ===
- Georg (Gernot Endemann, a German actor – 1986–1999) –
- Bettina (Hildegard Krekel, a German actress – 1986–1989, Kirsten Spick, a German actress – 1989–1999) –
- Opa Brass (Ferdinand Dux, a German actor – 1992–2000) –
- Pensionswirtin Helmi (Senta Bonneval, a German actress – 1995–1999) –
- Musiker Alex (Alexander Geringas, a German-Greek actor – 1995–2000) –
- Jiviana (Vijak Bajani, a German-Turkish actress – 1995–2001) –
- Nils (Nils Julius, a German actor – 2000–present) –
- Caro (Caroline Kiesewetter, a German actress – 2000–2002, Miriam Krause, a German actress – 2002–present) –
- Zauberer PePe (Dirk Bach, a German comedian – 2000–2012) –
- Anke (Anke Engelke, a German comedian – 2003–present) –
- Mehmet (Mehmet Yilmaz, a German-Turkish actor – 2003–present) –
- Ella (Franziska Troegner, a German actress – 2003–present) –

== Galli Galli Sim Sim (India) ==
- Jugaadu – A Muppet who likes to find innovative solutions to problems, and disregards his disability a handicap.
- Basha Bhaijaan – Owns a corner store and knows several Indian languages.
- Sid – A Muppet who is a cool, smart child; Googly is a fan of his style and dancing.
- Dawa Di – Basha's wife, who is from North East India, and teaches dance.
- Kabir – Basha Bhaijaan and Dawa Di's son, who is active and curious.
- Col. Albert Pinto – A retired army person, and advocate for healthy living and civic sense.
- Rukmini Pinto (Doctor Aunty) – Col. Pinto's wife.
- Chamki, – A tomboyish five-year-old girl, dressed most often, in a school uniform.
- Boombah – An eight feet tall, pink lion equivalent of Big Bird.
- Googly – A six-year-old, adorable and furry blue monster with a penchant for asking tricky questions.
- Aanchoo – A purple monster who is a storehouse of interesting stories from all over the world.
- Hero – An orange shade Muppet who loves to dress himself up.
- Khadoosa – As the name suggests, he is the grouchy neighbour in the Galli but is never intentionally mean. He is somewhat equal in role to Oscar the Grouch.

== Jalan Sesama (Indonesia) ==
- Momon – A five-year-old yellow monster who learns to draw letters and loves drawing and counting.
- Putri – An active young girl who is always asking Momon for help.
- Tantan – A wise female orangutan (equal in role to Big Bird) that settles every dispute on Jalan Sesama.
- Jabrik – A baby rhinoceros that is always complaining and laughing. He is equal in role to Oscar the Grouch.
- Agen Rahasia 123 (Secret Agent 123) – A James Bond-like agent who have a mission to solve a problem caused by a goat

== Rechov Sumsum/Shalom Sesame (Israel) ==
- Kipi Ben Kipod/Kippi Kippod – A giant porcupine analogous to Big Bird
- Moishe Oofnik (Gilles Ben David) – Oscar the Grouch's cousin
- Avigail – A purple female monster who is similar to Elmo, who also speaks in the third person.
- Brosh – An orange monster
- Mahboub (Yousef Sweid) – A blue monster
- Noah – A red monster
- Sivan – A girl who uses a wheelchair. She moved to Vila Sésamo near the end of its second run.

== Sesami Sutorīto (Japan) ==
- Teena – A pink monster who likes to sing.
- Mojabo – A green and purple monster who likes to exercise.
- Pierre – A blue-and-yellow frog.
- Arthur – A little yellow bird. He is the series' equivalent of Big Bird.
- Grorie – An orange Grover-like monster. She is the series equivalent of Grover.
- Meg – A Japanese girl.

== Hikayat Simsim (Jordan) ==
- Tonton - A yellow monster who likes to play soccer. Like Sesame Street's Elmo, Tonton speaks in the third person.
- Juljul - A grey Muppet monster who teaches children to be safe.
- Jiddo Simsim - A grandfather figure. Equal in role to Big Bird although he is a live human as opposed to a Muppet character.

== Iftah Ya Simsim (Kuwait) ==
- No'Man – A camel equivalent of Big Bird
- Melsoon – A light green parrot wearing a tie (blue in the 2015 version). Equivalent of Oscar the Grouch.
- Yaqut – A lavender monster with a long nose
- Abla – A full-body lavender cat
- Shams – A yellow monster that appeared in the 2015 version

== Plaza Sésamo (Mexico/Colombia/Hispanic America) ==
- Abelardo Montoya – A large parrot. Initially introduced as a red and orange reptilian dragon-like creature equivalent of Big Bird. He later became a parrot (initially named Serapio Montoya), with green and red feathers (Mexico's National colours; also the colors of a parrot, one of Mexico's most numerous and representative birds). He was later rewritten to be the cousin of Big Bird when Plaza Sesamo started using Big Bird segments from the American show albeit limited in use in 2001. On Spanish dubbed footage from the American show as well as DVDs/VCDs and other merchandise, Big Bird is called "Paco Pico" when his scenes are dubbed into Spanish for all Spanish speaking countries to avoid confusing audiences with Abelardo.
- Bodoque – A Grouch that lives in boxes. He is the cousin and second equivalent of Oscar the Grouch who took over Paco.
- Cuernos (Horns) – A red orange monster with a characteristic couple of horns and vicious teeth. Similar to Cookie Monster, he has a big appetite for food.
- El Barón Púrpura (The Purple Baron) – A Muppet portraying a lackluster air pilot. A satire of The Red Baron.
- Lola – A female relative of Pancho and Abelardo's best friend; a joyful young pink monster who speaks in the third person. She is the cousin of Elmo and Zoe.
- Paco – A parrot, the first equivalent of America's Oscar the Grouch
- Pancho – A blue-colored monster with a gruff voice. Like Telly Monster, his favorite shape is the triangle, and his favorite food to eat is onions. He is equal in role to Oscar the Grouch after taking over Bodoque.
  - Elefancio – Pancho's pet elephant. Only the trunk is ever seen like the trunk Oscar the Grouch's pet elephant Fluffy.
- Multimonstruos – Red orange Anything Muppet Monsters, appear as babies, pirates, etc., and are the equivalent of the AM Monsters of Sesame Street.
- Multimuppets – Orange Anything Muppets who are also the equivalent to the Anything Muppets of Sesame Street.
- Four birds
- A macaw
- Poco Loco
- A penguin
- A chicken
- Stuckweed
- A watermelon
- Anything Muppets
- Monsters
- Grouches
- Other animals

=== Humans in Plaza Sésamo ===
- Carlos
- José – The Storekeeper
- Alicia
- Fernando (Justo Martinez) – The police officer
- Mercedes
- Teresa (Romelia Aguero) –
- Sandra (Ana Silvia Garza) –
- Sebastian (Jaime Garza) –
- Miguel (Alejandro Ibarra) –
- Ana (Rocio Ortiz) –
- Goyo (Raoul Rossi) –
- Pepe (Salvador Sanchez) –
- Paula (Rosalia Valdez) –
- La Abuela (Evita Muñoz, Beatriz Aguirre) –
- Don Boni (Edgar Vivar, Sergio Corona) –
- Carmen (María Del Sol) –
- Gertrudis (Socorro Bonilla, Leonorilda Ochoa) –
- Pablo (Ariel López Padilla, Benjamin Rivero) –
- Maria (Paty Díaz, M'Balia Marichal Ibar) –
- Susana (Liza Echeverria, Mariana Garza) –
- Juan (Alberto Mayagoitia, Raúl Magaña) –
- Neftalí (Héctor Hernández, Pedro Romo) –
- Daniela (Maria Fernanda Urdapilleta, Mariana Botas, Paula Gutiérrez) –
- Manuel (Manuel Bermudez, Charlie Santana, Alan Sanchez, Santiago Hernández) –
- ToNo (Isaac Castro) –
- Romina (Anahí Sánchez) –

== Sesamstraat (Netherlands) ==
- Pino – A blue Full-Bodied Muppet bird equivalent of Big Bird, with blue, light yellow and pink feathers and an orange beak. He is also the cousin of Big Bird.
- Tommie – A Muppet dog
- Ieniemienie – A Muppet mouse
- Purk – A Muppet pig
- Troel – Tommie's girlfriend

=== Humans in Sesamstraat ===
- Buurman Baasje – male
- Elvan – female
- Frank – male
- Gerda – female
- Hakim – male
- Lot – female
- Meneer Aart – male
- Paula – female
- Rik – male
- Sien – female

== Sesame Square (Nigeria) ==
- Zobi - A Nigerian version of Cookie Monster.
- Kami - A HIV positive Muppet originally from Takalani Sesame.

== Sesame Tree (Northern Ireland/United Kingdom) ==
- Potto – A male monster Muppet; cousin to Telly Monster.
- Hilda – A female Irish Hare
- Claribelle – A red Muppet bird.
- Archie – A bespectacled squirrel.
- Bookworms – A bunch of Bookworms live amongst Potto's books.
- Weatherberries – A bunch of singing fruit. They often announce the weather whenever Hilda asks what the weather will be like today.

== Sesam Stasjon (Norway) ==
- Max Mekker – A big blue monster who owns a train station called "Sesam Stasjon".
- Alfa – A female yellow monster.
- Bjarne – A pink man who owns a ticket booth.
- Py – A red monster who hatched from a blue egg.

=== Humans in Sesam Stasjon ===
- O. Tidemann – A kind but somewhat blustery grandfatherly-type of a station master who generally manages to keep the station running smoothly, even if he does not always get the peace and quiet he wants.
- Leonora Dorothea Dahl – A former world-famous singer who used to travel around the world. She still likes to sing at any opportunity, and is a good cook.

== Sim Sim Hamara (Pakistan) ==
- Aaina - A Muppet.
- Agarmuch - A Magarmuch.
- Baily - A donkey who loves making music.
- Baji - A traditional Pakistani woman with a passion for nutrition
- Bhola - A Muppet.
- Haseen-o-Jameel - A flamboyant and vain crocodile who lives in a well.
- Munna - A five-year-old Muppet.
- Rani - A 6-year-old schoolgirl who is passionate about science and is the captain of her school's cricket team.
- Kiran - The 12-year-old daughter of the village schoolteacher. She is played by Saleha Majeed.

== Shara'a Simsim (Israel and the Palestinian Authority) ==
- Dafi (Irit Shilo) – Haneen's best friend; a three-year-old purple Israeli monster
- Haneen (Fadi al-Ghoul) – A three-year-old orange Palestinian monster.
- Kareem (Rajai Sandouka) – A seven-year-old punctual green rooster who showcases pride in his Palestinian culture.
- Kippi Ben Kippod (Guy Friedman) – A pink porcupine who lives on Rechov Sumsum
- Moishe Oofnik (Gilles Ben David) - A brown grouch from Rechov Sumsum who lives in a broken car
- Haneen (Fadi al-Ghoul) - A five-year-old orange monster.
- Kareem (Rajai Sandouka)

== Sesame (Philippines) ==
- Pong Pagong – A clumsy, pink full-body turtle wearing a baseball cap. In Sesame, he was the series' equivalent of Big Bird during the only season of Sesame.
- Kiko Matsing – A brown monkey.

Both characters were featured on the original run of Batibot.

=== Human characters ===
- Kuya Mario portrayed by Junix Inocian
- Ate Sylvia portrayed by Susan Africa
- Aling Nena portrayed by Angie Ferro
- Mang Lino portrayed by Joe Gruta
- Luz portrayed by Dessa Quesada
- Ben portrayed by Tito Quesada

== Ulica Sezamkowa (Poland) ==
- Bazyli – A large multicolored dragon. He is the series' equivalent of Big Bird.
- Beata – A short female sheep.
- Pędzipotwór – A turquoise monster.

=== Humans on Ulica Sezamkowa ===
- Mom (Anna Radwan, Polish actress) –
- Dad (Artur Dziurman, Polish actor) –
- Grandpa (Andrzej Buszewicz, Polish actor) –
- Kasia – A girl.
- Krzyś – A boy.

== Rua Sésamo (Portugal) ==
- Poupas – An orange bird and the cousin of Big Bird.
- Ferrão – A brown-colored version of Oscar the Grouch that lived inside a crate of wood in the town square on the street.
- Tita – A gray Muppet cat.

== Ulitsa Sezam (Russia) ==
- Zeliboba – A 9-foot furry blue Dvorovoi (tree spirit) who enjoys dancing. He is the full bodied Big Bird counterpart.
- Businka – A bright pink monster who finds joy in everything
- Kubik – An orange monster who is the resident pensive problem-solver who used to be a schoolteacher

== Takalani Sesame (South Africa) ==
- Kami – A yellow monster who raised controversy in the USA due to her HIV+ status
- Moshe – A four year old, vegetarian meerkat who is extremely optimistic and loves to dance. He is Takalani Sesame's equivalent to Big Bird.
- Zikwe – A blue monster who owns a taxicab with no wheels. He is Takalani Sesame's equivalent to Oscar.
- Kupukeji – A green worm found by Zikwe and cared for by Moshe
- Elmo – A red Muppet monster who loves to play with Zuzu and explore new things. He is from the same model as on the American series.
- Zuzu – A young purple monster who loves acting
- Basma – A young purple monster who loves new experiences and music
- Jad – A young yellow monster who has a passion with visual arts and is a good organizer
- Grover – A blue monster who appears in the Playtime segments along with Basma and Jad

== Barrio Sésamo (Spain) ==
=== Season 1 ===
- La Gallina Caponata – A red, orange, and yellow feathered hen with curly pink hair similar in height (2 metres (6 ft 7 in)) to Big Bird. She has the psychology of a six-year-old girl, naïve and curious about everything. Actress Emma Cohen operated and voiced this full-body Muppet.
  Her name "Caponata" is also later used as Big Bird's localized name in one of the Spanish dubs of Play with Me Sesame as well as some merchandise and other miscellaneous Sesame Street related media released Spain. Big Bird is also known as "Paco Pico" on some Spanish VCD/DVD releases of the American show across Spanish-speaking regions.
- Perezgil – A large male green snail with round glasses and curly green hair. He was a reader, writer, poet, and advisor of everybody in the neighborhood. Actor Jesús Alcaide operated and voiced this Muppet.

=== Seasons 2–4 ===
- Espinete – A male large pink hedgehog. Actress Chelo Vivares operated and voiced this full-body Muppet.
- Don Pimpón – A brown monster of an unknown species who works as a farmer and who has traveled all around the world. Actor Alfonso Vallejo operated and voiced this full-body Muppet.
- Chema the baker – The human baker in the neighborhood, played by Juan Sánchez.

=== Seasons 5–7 ===
- Bluki – A large, blue cat-like full-body Muppet.
- Gaspar – A red-haired human Muppet who works at a market.
- Vera – A female yellow monster Muppet.
- Bubo – A brown owl Muppet.

== Ahlan Simsim (Syria) ==
- Basma – a purple monster who loves new experiences
- Jad – a yellow monster who loves to paint
- Ma'zooza – a baby goat
- Ameera - a green monster with a spinal-cord injury who loves science and basketball

Both Basma and Jad serve as the series' equivalents of Big Bird despite not being full bodied Muppets.

== Susam Sokağı (Turkey) ==
- Kirpik – A Grouch who lives in a pile of boxes. Equal in role to Oscar the Grouch.
- Minik Kuş – A red version of Big Bird. Ironically, his name means "Tiny Bird" in Turkish.
- Kurabiye Canavarı – A Turkey counterpart of Cookie Monster.

== Play with Me Sesame (United Kingdom) ==
- Domby – A male monster Muppet, originally from Scotland. He and his friend, Kit, live in a castle on top of a hill.
- Kit – Domby's best friend. They spend most of their time in the castle kitchen, bedroom and living room (very similar to Ernie and Bert sketches). He is originally from Manchester. They sometimes visit schools and playgroups to sing or talk with the children.
