= Sesame Street international co-productions =

International production company for children's television programs

Sesame Street international co-productions are adaptations of the American educational children's television series Sesame Street but tailored to the countries in which they are produced. Shortly after the debut of Sesame Street in the United States in 1969, television producers, teachers, and officials of several countries approached the show's producers and the executives of the Children's Television Workshop (CTW), renamed Sesame Workshop (SW) in 2000, about the possibility of airing international versions of Sesame Street. Creator Joan Ganz Cooney hired former CBS executive Michael Dann to field offers to produce versions of the show in other countries.

The producers of these shows developed them using a variant on the CTW model, a flexible model of production based upon the experiences of the creators and producers of the American show. The model consisted of the combination of producers and researchers working together on the show, the development of a unique curriculum, and extensive test screening of the shows. The shows came to be called co-productions, and they contained original sets, characters, and curriculum goals. Different co-productions were produced, depending upon each country's needs and resources. They included both dubbed versions of the American show and versions created, developed, and produced in each country that reflected their needs, educational priorities, and culture. For example, the first HIV-positive Muppet, Kami, from the South African co-production Takalani Sesame, was created in 2003 to address the epidemic of AIDS in South Africa, and was met with controversy in the United States. By 2006, there were 20 co-productions in countries all over the world. In 2001, there were more than 120 million viewers of all international versions of Sesame Street, and by the American show's 40th anniversary in 2009, they were seen in more than 140 countries.

== History ==
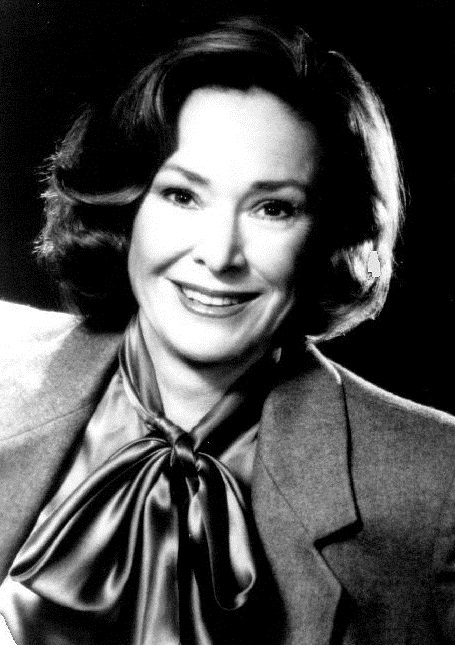
Sesame Street co-creator Joan Ganz Cooney (shown in 1985) was surprised when other countries approached the Children's Television Workshop requesting their own co-productions of the show.

A few months after the 1969 debut of Sesame Street on National Educational Television in the United States, producers from Brazil, Mexico, Canada, Iran and Germany requested that the organization responsible for the show's production, the Children's Television Workshop (CTW), create and produce versions of Sesame Street in those countries. Even before the American show's debut, the CTW established an international division, which oversaw its licensing in other countries. According to Gregory J. Gettas, the division immediately developed four main licensing policies: (1) Like the American version, all foreign versions had to be broadcast without commercials; (2) any changes would have to meet high production standards, which protected the CTW's proprietary interests; (3) all versions had to reflect the country's cultural values and traditions; and (4) all changes would have to be approved, initiated, and supervised by a local committee working with the CTW.

Many years later, co-creator Joan Ganz Cooney recalled, "To be frank, I was really surprised, because we thought we were creating the quintessential American show. We thought the Muppets were quintessentially American, and it turns out they're the most international characters ever created". Michael Dann, a former CBS executive whom Cooney had hired as a CTW vice-president and her assistant, was assigned to field offers from other countries to produce their own versions of Sesame Street. Dann's appointment led to television critic Marvin Kitman stating, "After he [Dann] sells [Sesame Street] in Russia and Czechoslovakia, he might try Mississippi, where it is considered too controversial for educational TV". (Note: In May 1970, the Mississippi state commission on educational television had voted to pull the show from the state's PBS station.)

By summer 1970, Dann had made the first international agreements for what the CTW later called "co-productions". 38 Canadian Broadcasting Corporation television stations broadcast Sesame Street to Canada's English-speaking provinces. The Armed Forces Radio and Television Network agreed to air the first 130 episodes of the U.S.-made show for children of military personnel serving in 16 countries, including Iceland, Greece, Ethiopia, and South Korea. During his tenure at CTW, Dann also made agreements with several Caribbean nations, Mexico, Australia, Japan, the Philippines, France, Israel, and Germany. He later told author Michael Davis, "I was aggressive and I knew people around the world". During the same period there were discussions about broadcasting the American version in Britain or producing a British version of Sesame Street, but British broadcasters found the show too controversial and rejected the idea. The American version was broadcast throughout the UK on a limited basis starting in 1971, but went off the air in 2001.

As of 2006, there were 20 active "co-productions". By its 50th anniversary in 2019, 190 million children viewed over 160 versions of Sesame Street in 70 languages. In 2005, Doreen Carvajal of The New York Times reported that income from the co-productions accounted for U.S.$96 million. Cole stated, "Children's Television Workshop (CTW) can be regarded as the single largest informal educator of young children in the world". Studies conducted on the effects of several co-productions (Mexico in 1974, Turkey in 1990, Portugal in 1993, and Russia in 1998) found that viewers of these shows gain basic academic skills, especially literacy and numeracy, from watching them.

In 2001, Sesame Workshop introduced Sesame English, a series focused on teaching children and their families the basics of the English language and on familiarizing them with some aspects of American culture. As of 2009 it aired in several countries, including Japan, Korea, and Italy. In 2003, in response to the epidemic of AIDS in South Africa, the co-producers of Takalani Sesame included the first preschool AIDS/HIV curriculum. They created the first HIV-positive Muppet, Kami, to confront the stigma of HIV and AIDS in South Africa. According to the documentary The World According to Sesame Street, the reaction of many in the U.S. surprised Sesame Workshop. Some members of Congress attacked Sesame Street, Sesame Workshop (previously, the CTW), and PBS. According to co-producer Naila Farouky, "The reaction we got in the U.S. blew me away. I didn't expect people to be so horrible ... and hateful and mean". The controversy in the U.S. was short-lived, and died down when the public discovered the facts about the South African co-production, and when UN Secretary-General Kofi Annan and American televangelist and conservative activist Jerry Falwell praised Sesame Workshop's efforts.

Gettas explained that what he called "Sesame Street's unprecedented appeal abroad" was its broad appeal and adaptability to other cultures. Gettas stated, "Here is a program that speaks to them in their own language, on their level, and with respect for their intelligence". According to Cooper Wright, the Sesame Workshop's vice-president of International Co-Productions in 2006, the "mission" of the co-productions was to "help children reach their highest potential". The producers were further galvanized to accomplish this goal after the events of September 11, 2001. Cooney stated, "Our producers are like old-fashioned missionaries. It's not religion they're spreading, but it is learning and tolerance and love and mutual respect".

== Production ==
The earliest international versions were what then-CTW vice-president Charlotte Cole called "fairly simple", consisting of dubbed versions of the show with local language voice-overs and instructional cutaways. Dubbed versions of the show continued to be produced if the country's needs and resources warranted it. They utilized a variant of a flexible model called the CTW model, developed by the producers and creators of the original show, to create and produce independently produced preschool television shows in other countries. The Workshop recognized that the production model developed in the U.S., which reflected its needs and culture at the time, served as a framework for other countries that wanted to repeat it. Its inherent flexibility was attractive to producers in other countries, who saw the model as "a methodological approach that is neither doctrinaire nor culture-bound" that could be used to achieve different results in different countries. According to the 2006 documentary The World According to Sesame Street, the producers of the co-productions repeated the "experiment" undertaken by the original U.S. show, but adapted it to each specific situation. In 1969, the producers of the original show depended upon government and foundation funding, but as Sesame Workshop CEO Gary Knell stated in 2009, the U.S. funding model would not necessarily be effective in countries with different economic and political structures. All co-productions share elements with the American show, but because of their different needs, no two are exactly alike. According to Gettas, the producers of the programs would "rely on variants of the CTW model to help them create programming that faithfully reflects the linguistic, cultural, social, or religious diversity of their native lands".

The 2006 documentary The World According to Sesame Street, which follows the production of some versions of the show

The need for preschool education in each country was assessed through research and interviews with television producers, researchers, and educational experts, which paralleled what the producers of Sesame Street did in the late 1960s. Then they convened the experts in a series of meetings, held in the individual countries, to create and develop a curriculum, the show's educational goals, and its set and characters, as was done in 1968 in the U.S. Finally, they held a series of meetings, both at the CTW offices in New York City and in the individual countries, to train the co-production team in the CTW model. Writing seminars were also held in New York.

The co-productions consisted of unique characters, sets, and curricula designed to meet the needs of their own children. Cole reported that the goal of the co-productions was to provide children in each country a program that reflected their country's culture, local values, and educational priorities. She stated that this cultural specificity was the reason for the co-productions' success, popularity, and educational impact. The co-productions combined universal curriculum goals that were common around the world with educational content that specifically addressed the needs of children in each country. Another goal of the international co-productions of Sesame Street was, as executive producer Lutrelle Horne stated in 1987, the improvement of "the overall quality of a country's television". He added, "We give a country a model of how television can be used effectively to address people's needs".

American cast members Kevin Clash and Marty Robinson have cast and trained the international puppeteers. At first, Muppet builder Kermit Love constructed the puppets for the new shows in the U.S. According to Gikow in 2009, Jim Henson's Creature Shop, overseen by Connie Peterson, has taken over puppet creation. The producers of Sisimpur, the Bangladesh co-production, created their own traditional puppets because their puppet-making craft is thousands of years old and an important part of their culture. The producers of each co-production developed and built their own sets, live-action videos, and animations in-country. After they developed, produced, and aired the new show, they conducted research to ascertain whether their curriculum goals were met, just as was done in the U.S. after the first season of Sesame Street. According to producer Nadine Zylstra, they faced unusual challenges rarely experienced in the U.S. For example, riots and conflicts between Serbs and Albanians in 2004 delayed production of the Kosovo co-production for three months. In 2005, a nationwide strike in Bangladesh temporarily stalled production of their show.

When countries were not able to afford creating original co-productions, the Workshop provided alternatives for them. They created Open Sesame, a series with no specific cultural references in it and, as Horne described, "universally acceptable material". The show was also broadcast on American military bases. The Workshop's library of Muppet skits, short films, and animations were sold to many countries and were either broadcast in English or dubbed in the local language. According to Gikow, it often served as the basis for the creation of new material for their own co-productions. As of 2009, the Workshop opened its entire library of episodes, short films, and animations created all over the world so that poorer countries could use and adapt them for their purposes.

== Co-productions ==
=== 1970s ===
The first international co-production of Sesame Street was Plaza Sésamo, which first aired in 1972. Its set consisted of an open plaza. The Muppet Abelardo was "the centerpiece" of the co-production and remained popular with viewers

Beginning in early 1973, Canada aired Sesame Street Canada. A French-dubbed version was shown in 1975, which demonstrated the producers' commitment to bilingualism, one of their curriculum goals. CBC Television enlisted television and radio producer Daniel McCarthy to work with the CTW to develop Canadian-specific set designs and themes, and along with Jim Henson, to create original Canadian Muppet characters. Segments from the American show were blended with original Canadian content, and McCarthy enlisted Canadian celebrities such as singer Anne Murray to appear. Like the American show, which encouraged children to learn both English and Spanish, Sesame Street Canada taught basic French words to its viewers. By the 1980s, the name was slightly altered to Canadian Sesame Street and the amount of Canadian-produced content was increased. In 1996, the series was retooled as a half-hour series with a brand new format, and was rebranded as Sesame Park. The series in its new format focused almost exclusively on Canadian content with occasional usage of segments from the original series. Sesame Park was canceled by CBC in 2001, with many of the show's Muppet characters being displayed in the CBC Museum in Toronto as of 2014.

In 1973, West Germany, one of the first countries to approach CTW, began airing Sesamstraße. It has been continually produced since. At first, this co-production incorporated original German animation and live action segments into the American version. Starting in 1978, its producers began using puppets filmed in their own studio in Germany. The Netherlands' version, Sesamstraat, began in 1976. This show has aired in both Dutch and Flemish. In Sesamstraat's early years, Belgian television participated in its production, so it also aired there. France aired Open Sesame in the early 1970s before creating its own co-production. One version created in 1974, Bonjour Sésame, was fifteen minutes long and had no street scenes. 1, Rue Sésame began production in 1977 before airing in 1978; its set consists of a courtyard of a building in a small French town.

The final two co-productions of the 1970s, both made in 1979, occurred in Kuwait and Spain. The Kuwaiti show, Iftah Ya Simsim, which ran until 1990, was the first of its kind in the Arab world. It used Modern Standard Arabic (MSA), and was broadcast in 22 Arab countries. The show continued to be well-known decades after it went off the air. It returned in 2013, and had similar goals and objectives as the original version, including the use of MSA. Barrio Sésamo, made in Spain, featured over the years such characters as Caponata the hen, Don Pimpon, Espinete the pink hedgehog, and Perezgil, a snail character who was able to hide a thousand and one things in his shell. One of the show's Muppet characters, Dr. Valentin Ruster, was based upon Dr. Valentín Fuster, a native Spaniard who worked at Mount Sinai Hospital in New York City. Dr. Fuster's likeness was created to educate children in Spain about exercise and eating healthy.

=== 1980s ===
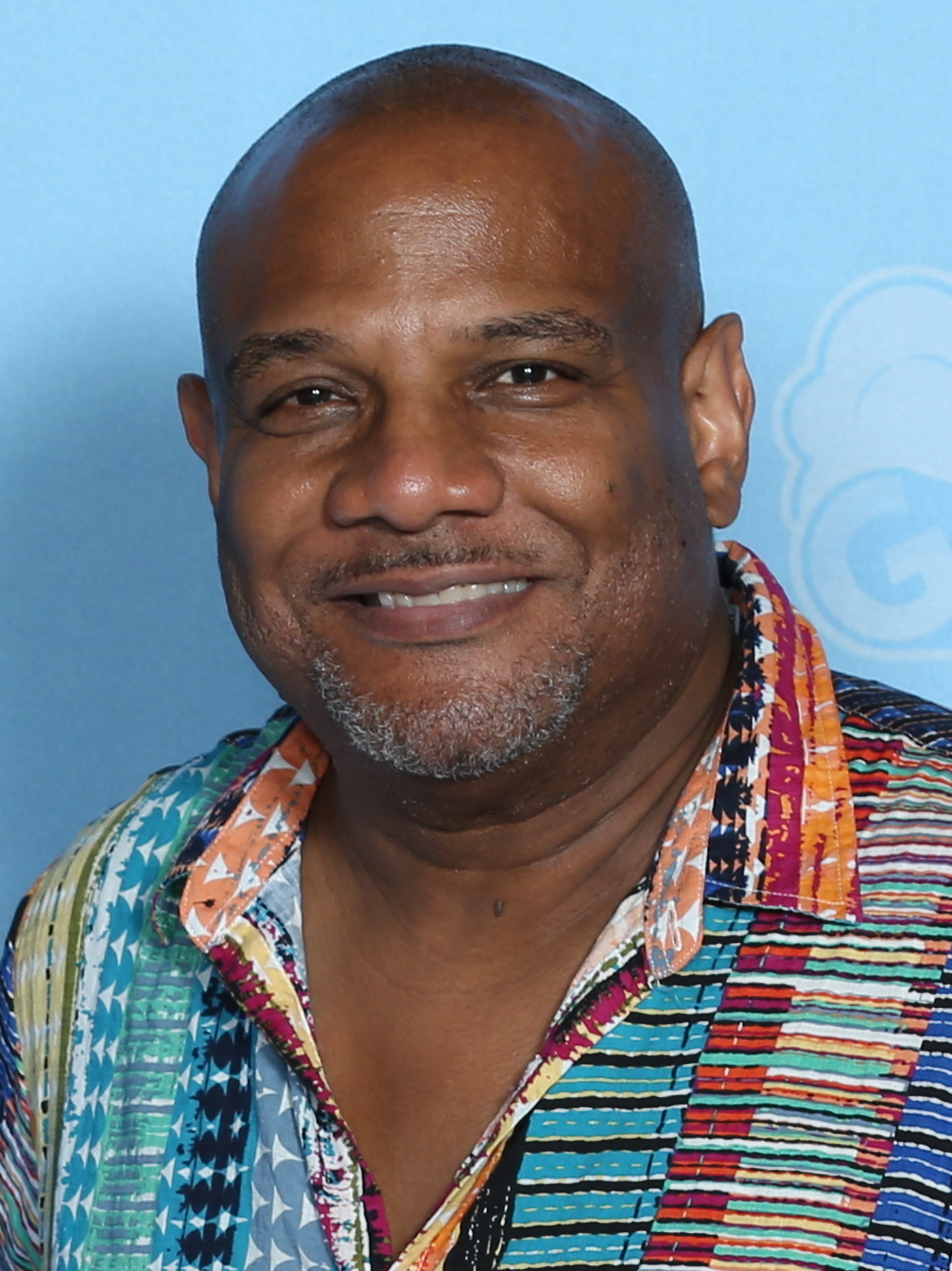
Kevin Clash (in 2022), who trained puppeteers for many international co-productions

Sweden's version of Sesame Street, Svenska Sesam (1981–1983), was originally a single-season full co-production, but did not integrate puppets. Dubs have aired before and after. Israel filmed its co-production, called Rechov Sumsum, in 1983. It was the first co-production to devote an entire section of its curriculum to educating children about mutual respect, which was a priority due to "profound political tension in the region". Its curriculum, which was based upon their viewers' needs, differed from many other countries and exposed Israeli children to children from different cultures. The show's counterpart of Big Bird was a hedgehog named Kippi, while Moishe Oofnik, who originally lived in a broken car, was the Grouch (and Oscar's cousin).

Also in 1983, Sesame! was co-produced for the Philippines. It was bilingual (Tagalog and English) and featured Filipino human characters and Filipino content alongside Sesame Street material in English. It featured a turtle muppet named Pong Pagong (the show's counterpart of Big Bird) and a monkey muppet who lived in an abandoned jeepney named Kiko Matsing (patterned after Oscar the Grouch). Sesame ran for less than year when CTW decided to cancel its co-production in 1984 for unspecified reasons.

In 1989, Susam Sokağı, a co-production filmed in Turkey, featured versions of Big Bird and an "exuberant little-girl Muppet host" named Simi. There have been three versions of Sesame Street in Portugal, including one co-production created in 1989. Rua Sésamo was also broadcast in the Portuguese-speaking nations Angola, Mozambique, Guinea-Bissau, Cape Verde, and São Tomé and Príncipe. Play with Me Sesame is the title of the current version.

=== 1990s ===
Norway's co-production, entitled Sesam stasjon, began filming in 1990. The Russian co-production Ulitsa Sezam (Улица Сезам) debuted in 1996. No longer on the air, one of its curriculum goals was to prepare Russian children to live in a "new open society". Poland's Ulica Sezamkowa, which also premiered in 1996, has been since replaced by dubs of various Sesame Workshop programs and has changed its name to Sezamkowy Zakątek. In 1998, the Chinese co-production of Sesame Street, Zhima Jie, was created. An auto mechanic became the head writer of this show, broadcast in Mandarin Chinese, because there were few people with experience in writing for children in the country. It has aired in 40 local markets, comprising forty percent of all Chinese homes. Its curriculum emphasized aesthetics. The Chinese puppeteers were trained by Kevin Clash and Caroll Spinney. Also in 1998, a fifteen-minute version of the Israeli show was dubbed in Arabic and renamed Shara'a Simsim; this Palestinian co-production promoted children's sense of national identity.

=== 2000s ===
In 2000, Egypt's co-production, entitled Alam Simsim (عالم سمسم), began to air throughout the Arab world and was broadcast in Arabic. Its curriculum focused on literacy, math, cognitive and social skills, girls' education, the environment, and health. The show was sponsored by its patron, Egyptian First Lady Suzanne Mubarak. A study conducted in 2004 showed that the show's efforts to educate Egyptian children about health were substantially influential.

South Africa aired Takalani Sesame, also in 2000; it focused on AIDS education with the creation of the first HIV-positive Muppet, Kami, who was declared a UNICEF "Champion for Children" in 2003. In 2005, a study was conducted about the show's impact on AIDS education in South Africa; it found that viewers exposed to Takalani Sesame demonstrated more knowledge and awareness about HIV, AIDS, and its treatment. The study also found that the show had a wide audience, even in communities without good access to electricity.

In 2003, Hikayat Simsim premiered in Jordan. According to its producers, its goal was to "promote respect in the face of conflict". The show also focused on literacy, numeracy, health and hygiene, emotions, road safety, and the environment. Afghanistan temporarily aired its first version of Sesame Street, called Koche Sesame in 2004, to help rebuild its educational system. Although this production filmed its own live-action films, it used Muppet segments filmed in the U.S., which were dubbed in Dari, one of the country's two main languages. The show's producers donated 400 education kits, which included a message from President Hamid Karzai, to schools, orphanages, and TV stations across the country. Its curriculum focused on encouraging awareness of other cultures, increasing opportunities for women and girls, and fostering children's interests in education.

2004 saw the premiere of the Japanese co-production, simply titled Sesami Sutorīto. However, it was not as well received as the dubbed version of the original US series that previously aired on NHK, and ended soon after. One of the puppets created for the Japan co-production, a yellow bird named Arthur, was later brought into the American version as a generic background puppet. 2004 also saw the December debut of the Kosovan co-production, titled Rruga Sesam in Albanian and Ulica Sezam in Serbian. The Workshop worked in conjunction with UNICEF to produce this show, to aid in the peace process between Albanians and Serbs. One of its goals was to demonstrate to Albanian and Serbian children that their counterparts were like them. The producers of the co-production chose to present the languages of the region more evenly. Instead of showing words on screen, children were challenged to label objects verbally, thus learning that there are different ways to say the same thing.

In 2005, Sisimpur aired in Bangladesh. This co-production's goal was to improve school achievement and decrease drop-out rates for children before the third grade. This difficult co-production, which was beset by political difficulties and severe flooding that delayed production, was depicted in the 2006 documentary The World According to Sesame Street. Galli Galli Sim Sim (Devanagari: गली गली सिम सिम) is the Hindi language adaptation of the series which aired in India from 2006 to 2018.

In 2008, Cambodia produced Sabai Sabai Sesame, a dubbed version of the original U.S. show. It aired twice weekly, and emphasized basic literacy, numeracy, and social skills. Northern Ireland's production, which was broadcast throughout the UK but was "rooted in everyday life in Northern Ireland", was called Sesame Tree, and was set in and around a whimsical tree. The show's curriculum focused on mutual respect and understanding. Also in 2008, Jalan Sesama, the Indonesian co-production, premiered; its focus was the country's rich diversity. Denmark created Sesamgade in 2009, which contained elements of Play With Me Sesame and locally produced segments with Elmo.

=== 2010s ===
Nigeria produced its own version of Sesame Street, called Sesame Square, in 2010. Previously, they aired the American version. Funded in part by a grant from the U.S. government, the show focused on AIDS, malaria nets, gender equality, and yams. It also featured the HIV-positive Muppet Kami from the South African co-production.

After an absence of ten years, and almost 30 years after the 1983 movie Big Bird in China, 53 eleven-minute episodes of Sesame Street's Big Bird Looks at the World, filmed in Mandarin Chinese, debuted in early 2011 in China. Inspired by the 2008 Sichuan earthquake, the program emphasized emergency preparedness. In the first week of December 2011, a Pashto and Dari-language version called Baghch-e-Simsim was launched in Afghanistan, and in the same month Pakistan began airing its own Urdu-language version, called SimSim Humara, which was supposed to run for three years. In June 2012, the United States terminated funding for SimSim Humara due to allegations of corruption by the local Pakistani puppet theater working on the initiative.

=== 2020s ===
In February 2020, a show called Ahlan Simsim was released on MBC3. The show is used to address dealing with issues in the Middle East.

Sesame Workshop introduced two Rohingya Muppets, 6-year-old twins named Noor and Aziz, to help the education of Rohingya refugees in Bangladesh. The characters were previewed in 2020 to children in the Kutupalong refugee camp in Cox's Bazar. The initiative was developed in partnership with the Lego Foundation, the International Rescue Committee, and the Bangladeshi charity BRAC. In 2022, a video series titled Playtime with Noor and Aziz was released on YouTube; it is the first media for children in the Rohingya language.

== See also ==
- List of Sesame Street international co-production characters
