= Baghch-e-Simsim =

- Genre: Educational
- Country of origin: Afghanistan
- Original languages: Dari, Pashto

Production
- Production location: Kabul
- Running time: 30 minutes
- Production companies: Sesame Workshop, Moby Media Group

Original release
- Network: Tolo TV; Lemar TV
- Release: December 1, 2011

Baghch-e-Simsim (Dari: باغچهٔ سم سم, Pashto: باغچهٔ سم سم; lit. 'Sesame Garden') is a Dari- and Pashto-language co-production based on the American children's television series Sesame Street. The series launched in Afghanistan in December 2011, and aired on TOLO and Lemar. The series halted production in 2021, when the Taliban retook control of Afghanistan.

== Production history ==
Sesame Street was first introduced to Afghanistan in 2004 as Koche Sesame, which was shown on state-owned television and as a teaching tool within some schools in the form of DVDs. One of the segments was "Grover Around the World", based directly on the "Global Grover" segments of the American original, as well as Sesame Street, and Play with Me Sesame.

Production of Baghch-e-Simsim began in 2010, with Sesame Workshop and Afghan company Moby Media Group producing. The series was partly filmed in Afghanistan, with other segments taken from other international productions and dubbed in Pashto and Dari.

The project is funded by the U.S. embassy in Kabul and is produced in consultation with Afghanistan's Ministry of Education. Baghch-e-Simsim's initial 26 half-hour episodes were aired in Dari on locally owned Tolo TV. The Pashto version was later aired on Lemar TV.

In July 2012 a radio version of the program was introduced, produced in partnership with Equal Access International.

In January 2015 a Taliban suicide bomber killed an editor of the show, Sayed Jawad Hussaini, during an attack on one of Tolo TV's buses.

The series launched its seventh season in 2019.

The series halted production when the Taliban retook control of Kabul in August 2021. The production team were originally denied access to evacuation flights out of the country, leading to Sesame Workshop CEO Sherrie Westin to undertake 48 hours of negotiations with U.S. military authorities. The production team, including the puppeteers, were eventually evacuated from Kabul.

== Characters ==
Non-original characters appearing in the show include Abby Cadabby, Bert (called Bart), Big Bird (called Shaw Parr), Cookie Monster (called Khajoor), Elmo, Ernie (called Hadi), Grover (called Kajkoal), Oscar (called Gom Gom), Prairie (called Pari), Rosita (called Rukhsaar), Telly (called Shaarmac) and Zoe (called Zeba). Zubair Ahmad Kakkar provides the voices for Khajoor and Kajkoal.

The first local muppet, a six-year-old girl named Zari, was added to Baghch-e-Simsim on 7 April 2016 as part of the show's fifth season. Zari's brother, Zeerak, was introduced in 2017. Both characters are intentionally made to appear pan-Afghan, as their outfits combine elements from multiple ethnic groups; similarly, both Zari and Zeerak are common names in both Dari and Pashto. Zari is puppeteered by Sima Seltani and Mansoora Shirzad.

The program also features characters from other international productions, including Khokha (from Egypt's Alam Simsim, called Khushaal), Tuktuki (from Bangladesh's Sisimpur, called Gulguly), Lola (from Mexico's Sésamo, called Laala), Businka (from Russia's Ulitsa Sezam, called Khwaaga), Raya (from Bangladesh's Sisimpur), Chamki (from India's Galli Galli Sim Sim) and Shams (from the United Arab Emirates' Iftah Ya Simsim).

== Content ==
The show has girls' education as one of its primary focuses. The program also focus on building pan-Afghan unity and identity. In one segment characters visit the national museum and learn about Afghan music, instruments, and dances, while in other segments characters visit monuments or sites of national importance, such as the Gardens of Babur and the Kabul Zoo. The show avoids references to political conflict.

Unlike some other co-productions, Baghch-e-Simsim does include some references to religion, such as a segment where a mother blesses her daughter or where a father brings his daughter to a mosque. The show also includes clips of ethnic and religious minorities, including Sikh and Hazara children.

== Reception and impact ==
As of 2017, approximately 80% of Afghan families who have access to broadcast networks watch the program.

According to Sesame Workshop, children who watched the program tested 29% higher on gender equity attitudes, and fathers who watched the program were more likely to send their daughters to school. A 2012 study by the US Embassy Kabul similarly found that the show helped persuade men to send their girls to school, and that parents found they better understood how to support their children's mental and emotional development. The study also found that children who watched the show were more visibly enthusiastic about learning

== TV channels and schedule ==
Upon initial release, the show was broadcast:

- Every Thursday through Sunday at 4PM on Tolo TV.
- Every Thursday and Friday at 5PM and Saturdays and Sundays at 3:30PM on Lemar TV.

== In other media ==
Zari was included as a special guest at the United Nations observance of World Children's Day in 2017.
