= Count von Count =

Sesame Street character

- Sesame Street character
- First appearance: Gordon and Susan meet Sam the Robot (November 13, 1972)
- Created by: Norman Stiles
- Performed by: Jerry Nelson (1972–2012); Matt Vogel (2013–present)

In-universe information
- Alias: The Count
- Species: Muppet vampire
- Gender: Male

Count von Count (known simply as the Count) is a Muppet vampire character on the children's television show Sesame Street. His first appearance on the show was in the fourth season premiere in 1972, where he counts six blocks in a sketch with Bert and Ernie.

== Description and personality ==
The Count's main role is to teach counting skills to children. His catchphrase is, "Greetings! I am The Count. They call me the Count because I love to count things!" (Note: During the first several years of The Count's incarnation in the 1970s, it was "Greetings! I am The Count. Do you know why they call me the Count? Because I love to count ... things.") The Count loves counting so much that he will often count anything and everything regardless of size or amount, sometimes to the point of annoying other characters. The Count can occasionally lose his temper when his counting is interrupted, or feel sad when there is nothing around for him to count, but apart from these, he is typically portrayed as friendly and cheerful. Once he reaches the total number of items he is counting, thunderstorms roll (even indoors or on sunny days) while he laughs his "Ah-Ah-Ah!" staccato laugh.

The Count lives in an old cobweb-infested castle which he shares with many bats, a wolf named Yuba, and a cat named Fatatita. As a running gag, his castle has a squeaky door, which visitors always point out, only for the Count to instantly change the subject to his counting addiction. The Count drives a special car, the Countmobile, which is designed to look like a bat (cf. Batmobile).

The Count has been shown with a number of girlfriends, who tend to be vampire Countesses. These include Countess von Backwards (debuted in Sesame Street's 28th season), who counts backwards, her total is indicated by a wolf howl; Countess Dahling von Dahling (debuted in the 12th season); and one simply called "the Countess" (first appearing in season 8). The von Count family includes an unnamed brother and mother as well as an Uncle Uno and grandparents. When the grandmother counts, it rains, and when the grandfather counts, it snows.

The Count has a personal cloud hovering over him, which is the source of his thunder and lightning. Some residents of Sesame Street have been disturbed by it in a few episodes. For example, in episode 0974, he was counting at midnight, disturbing others, and as his punishment, the Amazing Mumford used magic to detach his cloud, therefore taking his thunder and lightning away until he understood. This episode was inspired by the 1978 Sesame Street bedtime storybook titled Who Stole the Count's Thunder?.

According to BBC News, during an interview with the More or Less team's Tim Harford, the Count said his favorite number is 34,969. The Count was quoted as saying, "It's a square-root thing.": 34,969 is a perfect square, being 187^{2}.

The Count's signature song is "The Song of the Count". The song was written by Jeff Moss as a traditional Hungarian Csárdás.

== Character history ==
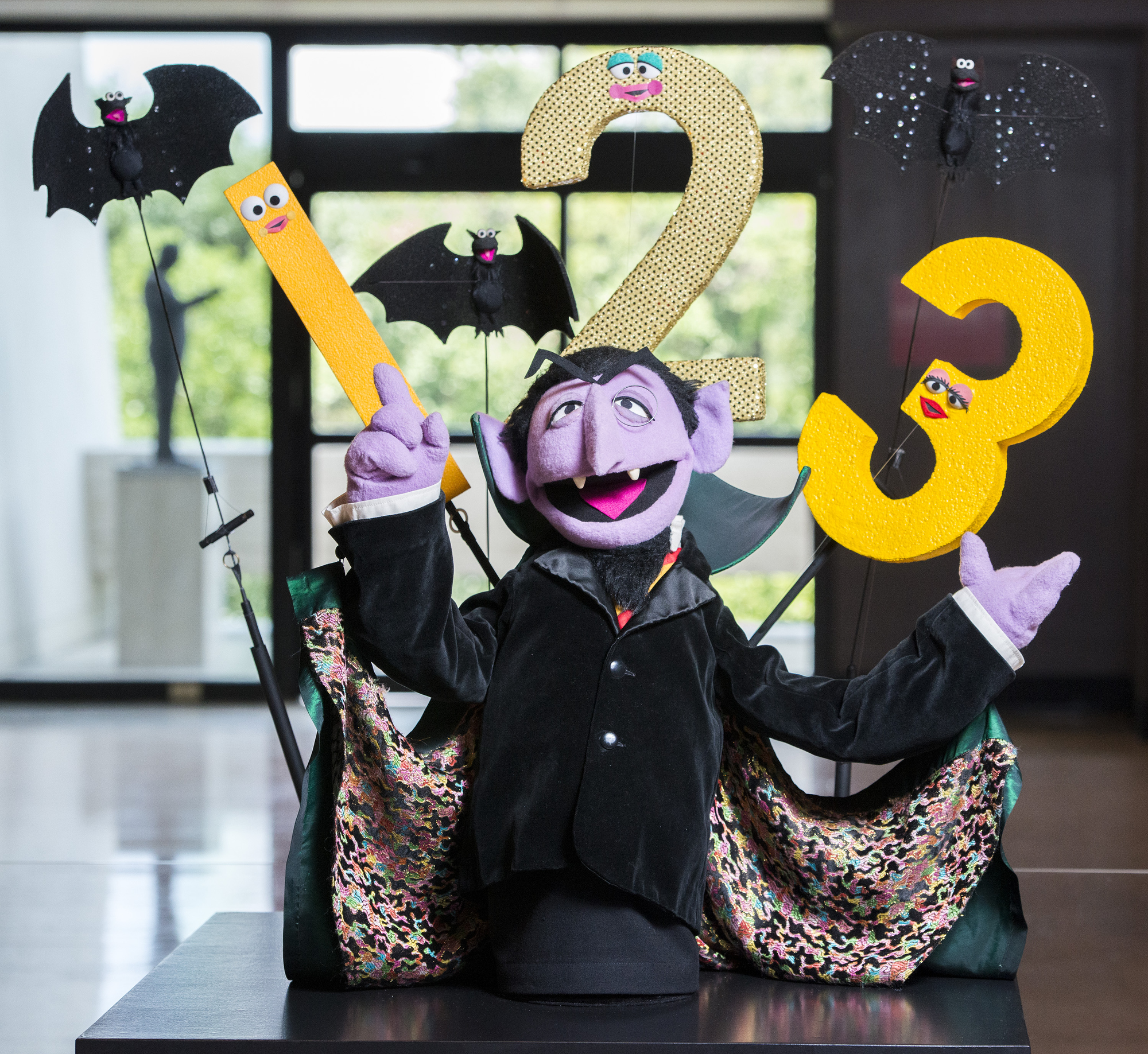
The Count von Count puppet on display in a museum, with accompanying bat and number puppets

The Count debuted on Sesame Street in Episode 0406, the premiere of Season 4 (1972–73). He was conceived by Norman Stiles, who wrote the first script, and performed by Jerry Nelson. He is made out of the Large Lavender Live Hand Anything Muppet pattern.

In the Count's very first scene, Ernie told Bert to watch his pyramid of blocks and make sure nothing happened to it while he got his camera to take a picture of the pyramid. The Count then walked by, counted the blocks, and in the process, took Ernie's pyramid apart before Bert could stop him. He then counted the blocks again, moving them back into place. Bert yelled at the Count for moving Ernie's blocks, so the Count counted the blocks again, taking the pyramid apart.

Before a counting session, he originally greeted the viewers (and the characters) by saying, "Greetings. I am the Count. They call me the Count because I LOVE to count ... things." Nelson voiced the Count until his death on August 23, 2012. At that time, Matt Vogel had taken over performing the puppetry of the Count. Upon Nelson's death, Vogel started performing both the Count's voice and puppetry. His first performance of the Count was in a YouTube video called "Counting the Yous in YouTube", a song about the celebration of Sesame Street's YouTube channel reaching 1 billion views.

Despite the fact that the Count is now friendly and non-threatening, in his earliest appearances from 1972 to 1975, he showed a much more villainous nature. To begin a counting session, the Count would enter the scene holding his cape over his face in an exaggerated Lugosi-style pose before reciting his greeting, and he was often accompanied by creepy organ music. He would not even let anything interrupt him while counting, and to prevent this, he shouted "SILENCE!" and used hypnotic powers to temporarily stun people with a wave of his hands (although he sometimes did this without shouting anything, and even did it for no reason, occasionally). He only did this twice. In his first appearance, he hypnotized Bert before counting Ernie's pyramid blocks, while on season 5, during a skit with Grover, the waiter, he hypnotized Grover to serve him more hot dogs to count instead of eating, leaving Grover breathless. And after counting, he would laugh maniacally while thunder and lightning flashed in moody colors, and then he would exit the scene, once again, holding his cape over his face. This aspect of the Count's personality, however, was abruptly ended in 1975 out of concern that it might frighten younger viewers, and this practice was changed, as he became friendlier, did not have hypnotic powers, did not enter or exit the scene holding his cape over his face, and interacted more pleasantly with the characters (both live actors and Muppets). Also, the creepy organ music was removed, the lightning flashes were changed from moodily colored to normally colored, and his laugh was changed from a maniacal laugh to a more throaty, triumphant Lugosi-style laugh, "Ah! Ah! Ah! Ah! Ah!"

Belvedere Castle, in New York's Central Park, was used for exterior establishing shots of the Count's castle on the show.

The Count made an appearance in the film The Muppets Take Manhattan at Kermit the Frog and Miss Piggy's wedding, then in the Sesame Street movies Follow That Bird (1985) as a supporting character and The Adventures of Elmo in Grouchland (1999) as a minor character. The Count appeared onscreen during the closing credits of Follow That Bird, where he proceeded to read and count the credits. He also said, "Hi, Mom." when a credit appears for Joan Ganz Cooney, creator of Sesame Street.

In Season 33, the Count was given a daily segment on Sesame Street, simply called The Number of the Day.

The Count was originally portrayed by Jerry Nelson. However, Nelson's health began to deteriorate in 2004, so he retired from performing all his characters except for the Count and his other Sesame Street characters. Due to his increasingly failing health, Nelson could no longer puppeteer the character of the Count, so he handed over puppeteering duties to Matt Vogel, though Nelson still continued to voice the Count. After Nelson's death in 2012, Vogel took over voicing and puppeteering the Count full time the following year.

== In other languages ==
- In the Arabic series Iftah Ya Simsim, his name is Addad (literally, "Number").
- In the Dutch version of the series, Sesamstraat, the Count's name is Graaf Tel (literally, "Count (nobleman) Count (the process of counting)").
- In the Finnish dub of the series, Seesamtie, his name is Kreivi Kamreeri ("Count Chamberlain")
- In the French series 1, Rue Sésame, his name is Comte von Compte.
- In the German series Sesamstraße, his name is Graf Zahl (literally, "Count Number").
- In the Hebrew series Rechov Sumsum, his name is 'מר סופר', phonetically pronounced 'Mar Sofer', which literally means "Mr. Counter".
- In the Mexican series Plaza Sésamo, his name is Conde Contar (literally, "Count of Counting").
- In the Polish series Ulica Sezamkowa, his name is Liczyhrabia (literally, "Countcount").
- In the Portuguese series Rua Sésamo, his name is Conde de Contar (translated as "Count of Counting").
- In the Russian series Ulitsa Sezam, his name is Graf Znak (Граф Знак; translated as "symbol" or "sign" as the mathematical categories).
- In the Spanish series, Barrio Sésamo, his name is Conde Draco.
- In the Turkish series Susam Sokağı, his name is Sayıların Kontu (literally, "the Count of Numbers")

== Appearances outside Sesame Street ==
- The Count was interviewed in character on the BBC Radio 4 economics programme More or Less on December 11, 2009, where he mentioned his favorite number, 34,969.
- He appeared on the Halloween edition of SportsCenter to count down the top ten trick plays of the 2010 college football season.
- He was a guest on Countdown with Keith Olbermann for the first-anniversary episode.
- In the Mormon Tabernacle Choir 2014 PBS Christmas Concert Keep Christmas with You, Tabernacle organist Richard Elliott along with the Count, performed "The Twelve Days of Christmas" on the 7,667-pipe Conference center organ.
- He was a guest on Late Night with Seth Meyers on March 27, 2015, to help out in the feature "This Week in Numbers".
- He was interviewed in character by Wired in a video released on February 22, 2017. In the interview, he cannot decide on a single favorite number, and says he will be 6,523,728 years old "next October."
- He has an ongoing role in supporting the United States Census in public service announcements.
- The Count appears in a cutaway gag in the Family Guy episode "Partial Terms of Endearment", after Meg mentions having been in a relationship with him. During the cutaway, the Count counts Meg's nipples while she is topless, but is horrified upon discovering that she has a supernumerary nipple and promptly flees.
- The Count has a popular account on social media site Twitter, under the handle "@CountVonCount". The account exclusively posts successive increasing numbers, sometimes accompanied by The Count's signature "Ah ah ah!".

== In popular culture ==
The St. Paul Saints, an independent minor-league baseball team in St. Paul, Minnesota, known for unique and sometimes over-the-top promotions, announced that it would give away 2,500 bobblehead dolls dressed as the Count at its May 23, 2009 game. However, instead of the Count's regular head, this doll's head featured Al Franken on one side and Norm Coleman on the other, and was called "Count von Re-Count"—referring to the extraordinarily prolonged recount and legal battle surrounding the 2008 U.S. Senate election between the two men. The team made further jabs at the election during the game.

Australian rugby league football international Anthony Minichiello has been nicknamed "the Count" due to his striking resemblance to the character.

During the 2020 United States presidential election, which required a ballot-counting period of four days before Joe Biden was declared the winner, the Count was featured in many internet memes and social media posts, such as playful wishes that he could be called in to assist the tabulation and the insistence that President Donald Trump's demand to "Stop the Count" was hopeless against the Sesame Street character.

== See also ==
- Arithmomania and Vampire for other vampires with a compulsion to count
