= Rruga Sesam/Ulica Sezam =

- Genre: Children's television
- Country of origin: Kosovo
- Original languages: Albanian, Serbian
- No. of seasons: 2
- No. of episodes: 52

Production
- Running time: 30 minutes
- Production companies: CMB Productions; Sesame Workshop

Original release
- Network: RTK; TV Puls; TV Most; TV Herc
- Release: December 5, 2004 – 2006

Rruga Sesam and Ulica Sezam are the Albanian and Serbian-language names for the Kosovan co-production of Sesame Street, which began airing in December 2004.

== Production ==
Inspired by the success of Rechov Sumsum/Shara'a Simsim, Sesame Workshop began considering creating a co-production for Kosovo, another region with high political and social tensions, in this case between ethnic Albanians and Serbians. The show was originally sponsored by the United Nations Development Program (UNDP) and UNICEF.

The first season began airing on 5 December 2004. Both the first and second seasons of the show consisted of 26 episodes, each half an hour long. The second season of the show began airing on Radio Television Kosovo, as well as Serbian-language channels TV Puls, TV Most, and TV Herc, in late 2006.

In 2006 the co-production was included in the documentary The World According to Sesame Street.

== Content ==
The content of Rruga Sesam and Ulica Sezam was essentially identical, with the exception of which language the episodes were dubbed in. The production combined Open Sesame content with locally filmed live-action segments focusing on children's lives. In addition to showcasing Albanian and Serbian children, the show also includes segments featuring Bosniak, Croatian, Gorani, Roma, and Turkish children. Unlike some other co-productions, no original muppets were introduced for the series.

The production had six broad educational objectives: human diversity (which included ethnic/cultural diversity, gender equality, and respect for disabled persons), emotions, social groups and institutions, health and safety, numeracy, and literacy. However, show creators ran into an issue while creating vocabulary segments. Albanian and Serbian use the Latin and Cyrillic alphabets, respectively, and neither group wanted to see the other's alphabet. A compromise was found in the form of a "visual dictionary", with segments showing children speaking the words, rather than showing words on screen.

== Community outreach ==
An outreach program was designed by UNICEF to complement the show and its episodes. Print materials (in both Albanian and Serbian) were distributed to families as part of this program.

In 2007 a series of picture books was launched to complement the show's messages.

== Reception and impact ==
A 2008 study commissioned by Sesame Workshop and carried out by Fluent Research found a positive correlation among 5 and 6-year-old Albanian and Serbian children between viewership of the show and positive attitudes towards other ethnic groups. Anecdotal evidence also suggests that adult viewers of the show became more aware of social issues such as water shortages.

== Bibliography ==
- Fluent Research (January 2008). "Assessment of Educational Impact of Rruga Sesam and Ulica Sezam in Kosovo". Sesame Workshop. Retrieved 14 March 2023.
