= Sesame Street in the United Kingdom =

A few months after the 1969 premiere of the children's television program Sesame Street in the United States, talks began in the United Kingdom to broadcast the programme or develop a co-production on British television. The idea was controversial at the time; the BBC was opposed to it, and ITV was reluctant. Response from parents, educators, and television officials to the show was varied, ranging from distaste to acceptance. After much public debate, the BBC chose not to air Sesame Street for several reasons, including the show's educational methods, its creation for American audiences, and the Britain's long history of quality educational television programmes for young children. ITV, after much research, including a report entitled Reactions to Sesame Street in Britain, 1971, chose to air Sesame Street on a limited basis. It then switched to Channel 4 in the 1980s and aired there until 2001, when it was pulled from its regular schedule, replaced by The Hoobs.

The 1971 report stated that educators "abhorred" Sesame Street, while parents and young children viewed it more positively. The report was sceptical of the educational methods used to produce the show and agreed with the BBC that quality children's programming was already in place in the United Kingdom, although it recognised that the public debate surrounding the show had improved children's television in Britain. It also stated that the producers of children's television programmes in Britain should follow the producers of Sesame Street's example and base their content on the feedback of its audience.

== BBC ==
Sesame Street premiered on public broadcasting television stations in the United States on 10 November 1969, to positive reviews, some controversy, and high ratings. A few months after its debut, producers from several countries requested that the Children's Television Workshop (CTW) create and produce versions of Sesame Street in their countries, which came to be called "international co-productions". Producers in the UK began discussing plans to broadcast either a co-production or the American broadcast on British television within six months after the show debuted in the United States.

The BBC disliked the series from the very beginning and refused to air a British version, citing that their own children's television programmes accomplished the same goals as Sesame Street (such as those in the Watch with Mother timeslot and Play School). They were interested in purchasing specific segments of the American version, but the Children's Television Workshop of the time refused. Throughout 1970 and 1971, debates raged in the British media about broadcasting the show in the United Kingdom. Joan Ganz Cooney, the creator of Sesame Street, expressed her hopes that a British version of the show could expose British children to "something more telling than The Magic Roundabout". Monica Sims, head of children's programming at the BBC at the time, stated, "This sounds like indoctrination, and a dangerous extension of the use of television". A teacher in North London showed the series to over 400 educators and reported that the most negative feedback was that Sesame Street was "brash and vulgar but utterly lovable".

On 24 November 1970, a half hour extract of the programme was shown at a meeting for the Society for Film and Television Arts. One member stated, "There is not much chance of it appearing on British television, but the Department of Education and Science was looking into using the programme in schools". Cooney said, "One day we thought: Can't we use commercials, not to sell products but to teach letters and numbers".

As the public debate over the series increased, Sims wrote a letter of reply in The Guardian outlining the BBC's decision and its objections regarding Sesame Street. It rejected the show's appearance in the UK because although the Corporation aired other American programmes, as well as programmes produced all over the world, Sesame Street was produced specifically for American children, who were not exposed to children's programmes of the same high quality as those in Britain. Sims and the BBC claimed that the philosophy behind the show was what they called "wallpaper television", which encouraged children to watch television for several hours, something British programmes discouraged. The BBC also eschewed Sesame Street's didactic teaching methods, which the BBC felt was inappropriate in mass media. The BBC was against children's programming that dictated what young children should learn, so airing Sesame Street would go against twenty years of children's television programmes in the UK. Finally, Sims and the BBC believed that since Sesame Street was "carefully geared" to the needs of disadvantaged children in the U.S., much of the terminology, including the words "trash" and "zip code", would confuse four-year-olds in Britain.

The decision of Sims and the BBC engendered both praise and disappointment and generated an investigation into the network's scheduling practices. The controversy also stalled development of a British co-production. In 1974, the BBC broadcast 13 episodes of The Electric Company, another CTW show, for an eight-week run. Its rationale to air it was that the show was a part of a school curriculum, accompanied by back-up resources such as books. With the BBC's refusal to air Sesame Street, the debate over its place on British TV passed to ITV.

== ITV ==
After the BBC rejected Sesame Street, the Independent Television Authority (ITA) considered giving it a network slot on ITV, after concluding that further research was needed. In March and April 1971, HTV broadcast a three-week weekday test run; the series was received favourably, but the ITA concluded that more testing would be required. It passed the enquiry to The Authority Schools Committee, which authorised LWT, Grampian Television and HTV to broadcast another test run of Sesame Street, under the understanding that its permission "should not be construed as educational endorsement of Sesame Street for British children". HTV's second trial ran in December 1971 daily for three weeks, and LWT and Grampian broadcast it for thirteen weeks on Saturday mornings from September to December 1971.

After the trials, Grampian dropped the series until July 1978, while HTV continued to air it. LWT continued to air it, but dropped it in August 1973, and reacquired it on 15 October 1977. The ITA and The Authority Schools Committee agreed to allow both companies to continue broadcasting the series after their study concluded in March 1971, with three additional ITV companies agreeing to air it the following year. Like the BBC, some ITV companies opposed Sesame Street, and certain ITV companies created their own original children's programmes. At the same time, the British government decided to require extra hours of children's programming in the afternoon.

In 1974, ATV aired the peak time Sesame Street special Julie on Sesame Street, with Julie Andrews. The special was filmed in the UK at ATV Elstree Studios.

=== Sesame Street broadcast dates in Britain ===
- HTV - 29 March 1971
- LWT and Grampian - 25 September 1971
- Granada - 8 July 1972
- UTV - 6 January 1973
- Westward Television - May 1973 (originally on Sundays, before moving to Saturdays in summer 1974)
- ATV - 6 July 1977
- Southern Television - 19 November 1977
- Border - 8 July 1978
- STV - 16 March 1979
- Anglia Television - July 1981
- Yorkshire - 29 March 1982
- Tyne Tees - 5 July 1982
- Channel Television - 4 April 1984

ITV's federal structure, which allowed each television company to decide what programmes it would broadcast, meant that it took over 15 years before Sesame Street was broadcast in all parts of the UK. The show was broadcast on Saturday mornings or during week-day school holidays. ITV continued to broadcast the series until early 1987, when, after an 8-month hiatus, it reappeared daily on Channel 4 from 30 November 1987 until March 2001. It then continued to air on Saturday mornings until 22 September 2001, when it was replaced by The Hoobs.

== Independent Television Authority Report ==
Reactions to Sesame Street in Britain 1971 was a report commissioned by the ITA in association with the National Council for Educational Technology and three ITV companies. The report was not distributed or published in the national press at first because the ITA believed that the increase in British children's programmes had decreased the demand for Sesame Street's broadcast in the UK, although both ITV and the BBC used the report to improve children's programming. The report found that educators "abhorred" Sesame Street for discrediting and possibly corrupting educational objectives. It also questioned the success of the educational approaches used by the show.

Frank Blackwell, the director of the primary extension programmes for the National Council for Educational Technology, carried out the research reported in ITA's report. Both children and their parents were questioned about their interaction with Sesame Street, and sociologists watched children's reactions while watching it. They found that 98—99% of young viewers enjoyed it, and were surprised to discover that most of the negative reactions were from educators. Most parents had positive reactions.

The report cited the concerns raised by Americans such as John Holt and Arnold Arnold about the educational techniques used in Sesame Street, as well as the validity of the research used by the CTW to produce the show. The investigators recognised the show's success in the U.S., but agreed with the BBC that both the ITA and the BBC had over twenty years of experience producing high-quality educational programmes for children, unlike in the U.S., where the production of Sesame Street was the first time a "proper pre-school television programme" was made. The report also agreed that the BBC's carefully selected imported programmes upheld their high standards.

In the UK, the organisations involved in the production of educational television programmes were small, so it was easy for them to work together, thus forming a pool of knowledge accessible to few outside the industry. As a result, it was difficult to compare Sesame Street and British-made series, although Sesame Street helped galvanise the BBC and ITV to produce additional educational programmes for children. The report recommended that British shows follow the example of the producers and creators of Sesame Street, and adjust the content of their programmes based upon their audience's feedback. The report concluded that without Sesame Street, discussion would not have occurred, and the changes to both American and British children's programming would not have happened as quickly.

The ITA's report found that most parents reported that their children were interested in Sesame Street. Parents also reported that children responded well to the show, found the series funny, that it held their attention, and that most learned from viewing it. Most of their children requested to watch the show again. Parents' criticism of the show was that the pace was too fast, that some of the songs included were poor-in-quality, and that children were confused regarding the use of upper and lower case letters. Half of the parents questioned believed that a fifty-minute children's programme was too long. Parents' criticisms of Sesame Street tended to vary depending upon the region. 64% of parents in the HTV test area and 43% of parents in the LWT area considered the show too American.

Overall, the feedback from young viewers was positive. The report found that children's attention levels were highest during the show's jazz segments, and that their favorite Muppets were Bert and Ernie. In the Grampian area, some children found the use of letter names rather than sounds confusing, especially after they began school.

== Absence from UK screens ==
Following the discontinuation of terrestrial broadcasts by Channel 4, Sesame Street has also been shown on satellite and cable channels, such as Nick Jr. from 2000 to 2003 and the Disney Channel.

As of 2011, the broadcast of Sesame Street in the UK was limited to BBC Northern Ireland, which has aired Sesame Tree since 2008, and TG4, which aired Tar ag Spraoi Sesame in Northern Ireland from 2007. The show's spin-off, Play with Me Sesame, was aired on Playhouse Disney, and Channel 5 aired three of the show's segment series, Elmo's World, Bert and Ernie's Great Adventures and Abby's Flying Fairy School. Channel 5 preferred to dub British voices onto their imported shows, and feels that utilising puppets is outdated. The BBC has stood by its original decision, and its position that other children's programmes in the UK cover similar learning themes and values.

In 2014, CBeebies launched a Sesame Street spin-off called The Furchester Hotel, which included Elmo and Cookie Monster as well as new characters. The second season introduced more Sesame Street characters as visitors to the hotel.

Sesame Street returned to UK television on Cartoon Network's sister pre-school channel, Cartoonito on 7 November 2016 for a six-month period, with the last episodes aired at the end of April 2017. In December 2018, a segment called Cookie Monster’s Foodie Truck that airs on Tiny Pop, then another segment, Elmo's Wonderful World that was first aired on the same channel on 1 January 2020 and Cookie’s Crumby Pictures and Super Grover 2.0 joined in on 1 September, the block was called "Sesame Workshop" (which happened to be the name since 2000 of the former Children's Television Workshop).

On 30 May 2020, BBC One aired the half-hour special Elmo's Playdate - produced in response to the COVID-19 pandemic - marking the first time Sesame Street has been broadcast on the BBC's main domestic television network. The special also aired earlier in the month on CBeebies.

== VHS releases ==
VHS title	Release date	Episodes
Sesame Street 1 (VC1094)	21 September 1987	Learning About Numbers, Learning to Add and Subtract
Sesame Street 2 (VC1095)	21 September 1987	Learning About Letters, Getting Ready to Read
Sesame Street 3 (VC1096)	21 September 1987	I'm Glad I'm Me, Sing Along
Sesame Street 4 (VC1097)	9 May 1988	Bedtime Stories and Songs, Getting Ready for School
Sesame Street 5 (VC1098)	9 May 1988	Play Along Games and Songs, Big Bird's Story Time
Sesame Street - Learn to Read, ABC (VC1215)	26 August 1991	Learning About Letters, The Alphabet Game
Sesame Street - Learn to Count, 123 (VC1216)	26 August 1991	Learning About Numbers, Learning to Add and Subtract
Sesame Street - Playalong - Singalong (VC1217)	26 August 1991	Play Along Games and Songs, Sing Along
Sesame Street - Bedtime Stories (VC1218)	26 August 1991	Bedtime Stories and Songs, Big Bird's Story Time
Sesame Street - Christmas Eve on Sesame Street (VC1220)	11 November 1991	Christmas Eve on Sesame Street
Sesame Street - Dance Along!/Big Bird's Favourite Party Games (VC1234)	17 February 1992	Big Bird's Favourite Party Games, Dance Along!
Sesame Street - Sing Yourself Silly!/Monster Hits (VC1235)	17 February 1992	Sing Yourself Silly!, Monster Hits
Sesame Street - Learning About Letters (VC1334)	14 February 1994	Learning About Letters
Sesame Street - Learn to Read (VC1335)	14 February 1994	Getting Ready to Read
My Little Sesame Street - Big Bird's Favourite Party Games (ML0018)	5 February 1996	Big Bird's Favourite Party Games
Sesame Street - Do the Alphabet/Getting Ready to Read (D610420)	20 October 1997	Do the Alphabet, Getting Ready to Read
Sesame Street - Learning About Numbers/The Best of Bert and Ernie (D610463)	20 October 1997	Learning About Numbers, The Best of Bert and Ernie
Sesame Street - Elmo's Sing Along Guessing Game/Elmocize (D610464)	20 October 1997	Elmo's Sing Along Guessing Game, Elmocize
Sesame Street - Cookie Monster's Best Bites/Play Along Games and Songs (D610465)	20 October 1997	Cookie Monster's Best Bites, Play Along Games and Songs
Sesame Street - Elmo Saves Christmas (D610469)	10 November 1997	Elmo Saves Christmas
Sesame Street - Sing Along/Sing, Hoot and Howl (D610570)	9 February 1998	Sing Along, Sing, Hoot and Howl
Sesame Street - Get Up and Dance/Dance Along (D610571)	9 February 1998	Get Up and Dance, Dance Along
Sesame Street - Sleepy Time Songs and Stories/Quiet Time (D610572)	9 February 1998	Sleepy Time Songs and Stories, Quiet Time
Sesame Street - Big Bird's Story Time/Big Bird Sings (D610573)	9 February 1998	Big Bird's Story Time, Big Bird Sings
Sesame Street - Learning to Share/We All Sing Together (D610574)	13 July 1998	Learning to Share, We All Sing Together
Sesame Street - Telling the Truth/A New Baby in My House (D610575)	13 July 1998	Telling the Truth, A New Baby in My House
Sesame Street - Learning About Letters/Sing Yourself Silly! (D610782)	3 August 1998	Learning About Letters, Sing Yourself Silly!
Sesame Street - 123 Count With Me/Imagine That! (D610783)	3 August 1998	123 Count with Me, Imagine That!
Sesame Street - The Great Numbers Game/Let's Eat (D610916)	26 April 1999	The Great Numbers Game, Let's Eat
Sesame Street - The Alphabet Jungle Game/Monster Hits (D610967)	26 April 1999	The Alphabet Jungle Game, Monster Hits
Sesame Street - The Best of Elmo/Fiesta! (D610978)	19 July 1999	The Best of Elmo, Fiesta!
Sesame Street - Big Bird Gets Lost/Rock 'n' Roll (D610979)	19 July 1999	Big Bird Gets Lost, Rock 'n' Roll
Sesame Street - Elmo Says Boo!/Kids' Favourite Songs (D610980)	30 August 1999	Elmo Says Boo!, Kids' Favourite Songs
Sesame Street - Getting Ready for School/Sing Yourself Sillier! (D610981)	30 August 1999	Getting Ready for School, Sing Yourself Sillier!
Sesame Street - Put Down the Duckie	25 October 1999	Put Down the Duckie
Sesame Street - Christmas Eve on Sesame Street	29 November 1999	Christmas Eve on Sesame Street
