= Rosita (Sesame Street) =

Sesame Street Muppet character

- Sesame Street character
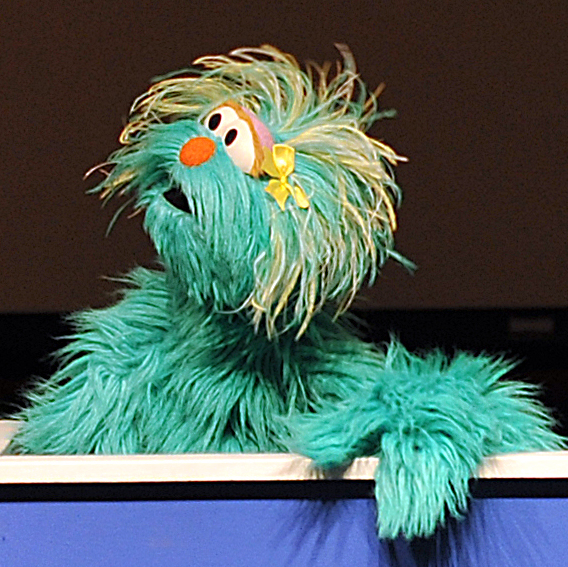
- First appearance: Rosita's first day of Sesame Street (1991)
- Created by: Ed Christie
- Performed by: Carmen Osbahr
- Birthday: December 7
- Age: 5

In-universe information
- Species: Muppet monster
- Gender: Female
- Nationality: Mexican-American

Rosita is a Muppet character on the children's television series Sesame Street. Fluent in both English and Spanish, she is the first regular bilingual Muppet on the show. Rosita comes from Mexican descent and likes to play the guitar.

== History ==
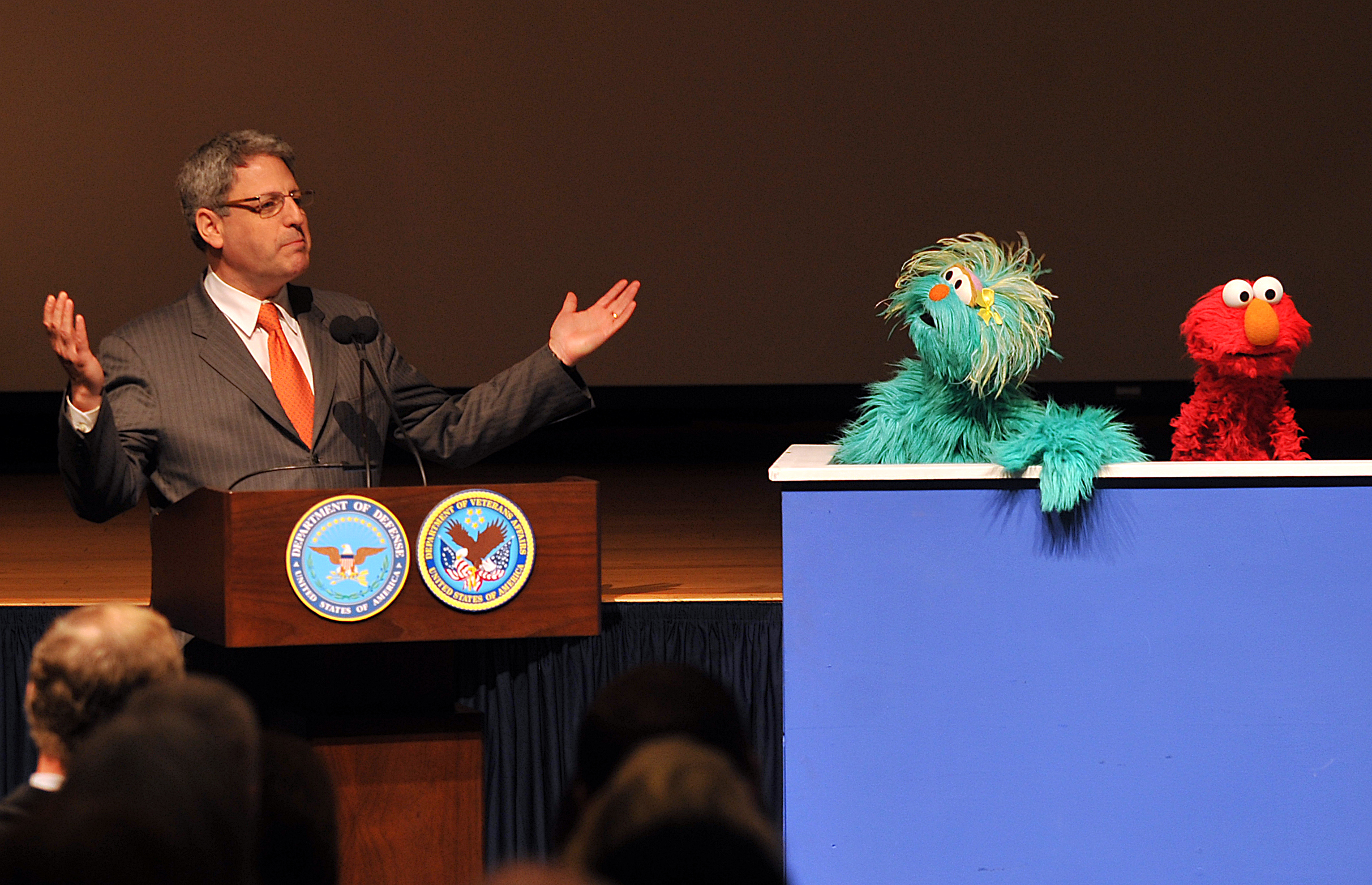
Rosita and Elmo with Gary Knell, the president and CEO of Sesame Workshop, March 2009

Rosita was introduced to the series in 1991. Rosita was originally designed to look similar to a fruit bat and bore the name Rosita, La Monstrua de las Cuevas ("the monster of the caves"). Her wings were removed in 2004 (in the show's 35th season) but restored in 2021 (in the show's 52nd season).

Rosita is performed by Carmen Osbahr, who originally worked on Mexico's Plaza Sésamo.

In July 2022, Sesame Place in Pennsylvania faced criticism after a family claimed in an Instagram post that the character snubbed their two young Black children by ignoring them as they waved to her. The video went viral as other users posted similar incidents of costumed characters and black children at the park, with those on social media calling for a boycott of the park. The park released a statement that the costume had made it difficult for the performer to see the girls. They later followed with another statement that the performer had not intentionally snubbed the girls, but instead rejected a request "from someone in the crowd who asked Rosita to hold their child for a photo which is not permitted." On July 19, Sesame Place Pennsylvania formally apologized to the family and invited the family back for a personal meet-and-greet with the characters. They also announced that their employees will undergo racial bias training to ensure park guests have an "inclusive, equitable and entertaining" experience.
