= Syed Dulal =

Bangladeshi actor

Syed Dulal সৈয়দ দুলাল
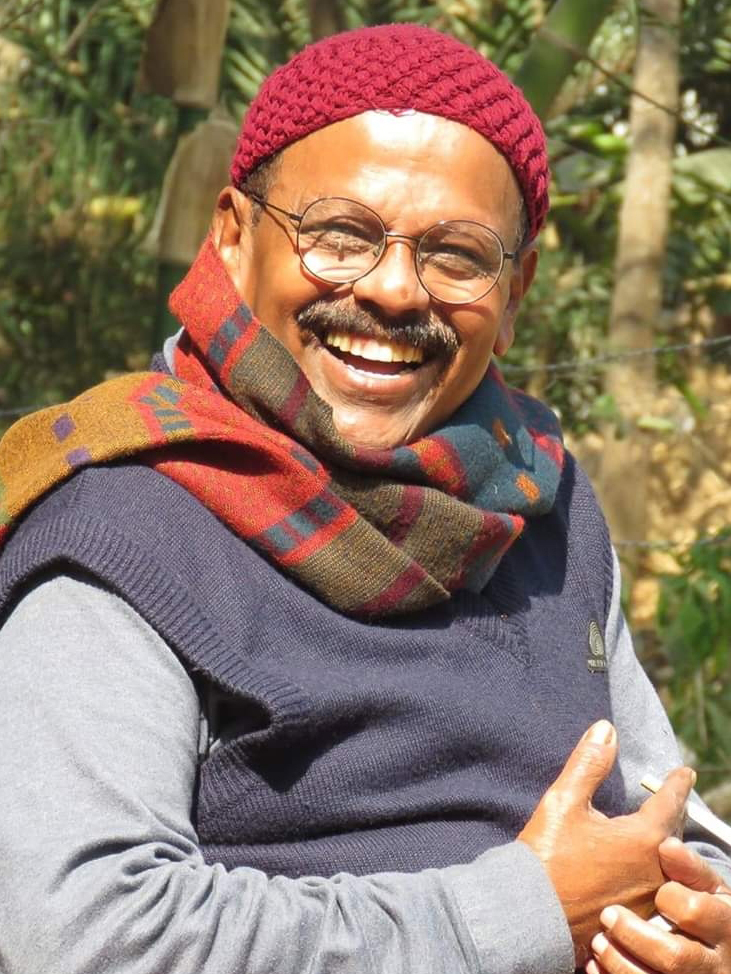
- Born: 03 July
- Occupations: Theater Activist & Founder at Shabdaboli studio theater, Executive Member at International Theatre Institute (ITI) Bangladesh Center and সম্পাদক at আনন্দলিখন
- Known for: Introducing Studio Theatre in Bangladesh; Guni Moyra of Sisimpur
- Children: 1 Daughter and 1 Son

Syed Dulal is a Bangladeshi theatre artist and television actor who has introduced studio theatre in Bangladesh. As of 21 December 2012 he had directed 851 theatre plays. He is also known for portraying "Guni Moyra" in Sisimpur.

== Awards ==
- Abul Kashem Dulal Memorial Medal
- Nandonik Natyajon Award
- Palakar First Anniversary Award
