= Sisimpur =

- সিসিমপুর
- Genre: Educational children's television series
- Starring: Munna Ghosh; Kabyakatha Proteeti; Liton Das; Twinkle Chowdhury
- Opening theme: "Cholche Gari Sisimpure"
- Country of origin: Bangladesh
- Original language: Bengali
- No. of seasons: 15
- No. of episodes: (list of episodes)

Production
- Production company: Sesame Workshop

Original release
- Network: Bangladesh Television; Duronto TV; Maasranga Television
- Release: April 2005 – present

Related
- Sesame Street

Sisimpur characters Tuktuki, Ikri Mikri, and Shiku.

Sisimpur (Bengali: সিসিমপুর) is the Bangladeshi co-production of the American children's television series Sesame Street. The show premiered in April 2005 on Bangladesh Television. The series is co-produced by Bangladesh-based Nayantara Communications and Sesame Workshop.

It was Bangladesh's first children's educational program and was expected to be seen by 4 million children in its first two years.

== Production ==
Production on the show began in 2003, with the show debuting in April 2005.

Local production designers localized the backdrop for the show by building a set centering on a rural street with a banyan tree and tea and sweet shops. The creation of Sisimpur was described in detail in the 2006 documentary The World According to Sesame Street.

USAID committed US$7 million in funding for the show over its first three years. USAID funding for the show has continued as of 2022.

== Messaging ==
Content for the series was created in collaboration with local educators.

The series promotes values like self-respect, empathy, and cooperation, and subjects such as girls' education, nutrition, hygiene, safety, and cultural traditions and diversity.

Since 2015 the series has broadcast a holiday episode during Eid.

The fourteenth season focused on empathy as its theme. The fifteenth season included the show's first mentions of autism, through the introduction of new muppet Julia, and some segments with sign language.

== Characters ==
Muppet characters include:

- Grover
- Halum is a Bengal tiger who loves fish, fruits, and vegetables. Halum was designed by Ed Christie, built by Rollie Krewson, and voiced by Ashraful Ashish.
- Ikri Mikri is a small 3-year-old blue monster. Within the character's imagination are three marionettes named Bhutto, Gaanwalla, and Hatim, who act out Bangladeshi folk tales. Ikri Mikri was designed by Ed Christie and built by Ann Marie Holdgruen. This character was voiced by Quazi Nawshaba Ahmed and later Kabyakatha Proteeti.
- Julia is a four-year-old autistic girl, who loves her doll and drawing.
- Shiku is a small and curious 5-year-old jackal. Shiku was designed by Ed Christie, built by Victoria Ellis, and voiced by Shuvangkar Das Shuvo.
- Tuktuki is an inquisitive 5-year-old girl who loves school and cricket. Tuktuki was designed by Ed Christie and built by Ann Marie Holdgruen. This character was voiced by Sayma Karim with Parvin Paru often assisting.
- Manik-Ratan: A pair of two sheep. Together they are addressed as Manik-Ratan.
- Raya is an intelligent girl. In the 14th season, he explained various things to Grover, all of which Grover was wrong about.
- Khepu: A purple Grouch that lives in a claypot. He is the series equivalent of Oscar.

The show has no full-body puppet character and, thus, no equivalent to Big Bird.

Human characters include:

- Lal Mia: postman; the actor later died, and the character died within the show, a la Mr. Hooper.
- Mukul Moira: university graduate and a nursery owner (played by Chanchal Chowdhury).
- Sumona Moira: local school teacher. (played by Runa Khan)
- Guni Moira: sweet shop owner (played by Syed Dulal)
- Asha Moira: Guni's wife and the local librarian
- Polash Moira: Guni and Asha's son.
- Bahadur: postman (played by Shahadat Hossain).
- Nanu: tells stories to Ikri Mikri.

== Episodes ==
The first season of the series featured 26 episodes, and a second season of 36 episodes was in production by 9 February 2001. A third season went into production in April 2007. As of 2022, the show had fourteen seasons, with the fifteenth season of 26 episodes premiering in February 2023.

The series airs four times a week on Bangladesh Television (BTV). The program airs on BTV at 9:05 am on Friday, with repeats on Saturday at 2:15 pm, Wednesday and Thursday at 5:05 pm. Sisimpur started airing on children's channel Duronto TV on July 14, 2019. Starting in 2020 the series also aired on Maasranga Television.

In October 2022 it was confirmed that Sisimpur would continue to air on Bangladesh Television for the next five years, and in January 2023 Duronto TV also received airing rights for the next four years.

== Reception and impact ==
Within seven months of its premiere, 75% of households with a television were watching the series. The program is popular not only among its 3-6 demographic, but also among older children.

A 2005 study found that children who watched the program showed better vocabulary, counting skills, cognitive skills, life skills, and cultural knowledge compared to children who didn't.

A 2009 study found that teachers who watched the program were more likely to understand children as learning through play, and parents who watched the program tended to view children as persons who were central to a better future and who were deserving of attention and respect. Some parents attempted to include Sisimpur lessons into their own parenting styles, while others appreciated seeing values they already held being portrayed on-screen in ways that were accessible to children. Parents also reported that children seemed to absorb lessons more readily from the show than from parental instruction.

== Other media ==
In 2017 Sisimpur collaborated with the AO Foundation to produce some segments and a public service announcement about safety and accident prevention. In 2018 a version of the show was created for radio broadcast, focusing on financial literacy for children and families.

In November 2022 it was announced that ten popular Sisimpur books would be published in Braille editions.

In December 2022 the show partnered with UNESCO to promote World Heritage Sites in Bangladesh. This would come in the form of a video documentary primarily focusing on the Mosque City of Bagerhat, Sundarbans, and Somapura Mahavihara.

== Accolades ==
- 2022: 14th International Kidscreen Awards for Best Mixed Media Series
