= Ed Christie =

Ed Christie (born May 20, 1956) is an art director and puppet designer. Christie started out as an intern with Henson Associates in 1978. He graduated from UMass Amherst with a BFA/Education in 1979.

After years of learning Muppet design techniques, and building many of the classic Muppet characters, Christie was promoted to Muppet Supervisor in charge of Sesame Street (1991-1996). He was later promoted to Vice President/NY Muppet Workshop Supervisor (1997-2004) as well as Art Director for Henson on Sesame Street. He also contributed his skills to Henson Licensing and Publishing.

In 2004, Christie left Henson and was contracted by Sesame Workshop where he is currently designing characters for the domestic version of Sesame Street and Sesame Street International. He has designed the Muppet characters for Sesame India, Bangladesh, Russia, Israel, South Africa, Egypt, China, Poland, France, Mexico, Canada, Japan, and others. Christie is featured in the film The World According to Sesame Street.

He has won 8 Emmy Awards for his work on Sesame Street and numerous nominations for other Henson productions. Christie's work was also seen in the Broadway productions of Doonesbury, Peter Pan, Sugar Babies, and Encores! Carnival!.
