= Ulica Sezamkowa =

- Genre: Children's television series
- Created by: Joan Ganz Cooney (concept); Jim Henson (concept)
- Starring: Andrzej Buszewicz
- Country of origin: Poland
- Original language: Polish
- No. of episodes: 52

Production
- Production companies: Children's Television Workshop 1996–2000; Sesame Workshop 2000–2001

Original release
- Network: TVP2
- Release: October 27, 1996 – 2001

Ulica Sezamkowa is the Polish co-production of the children's television series Sesame Street. It first aired in late 1996.

== Production ==
Sesame Street had previously been aired in Poland, with a Polish voiceover.

The Muppets seen in the series were designed in the United States by Jim Henson Productions, using Polish children's sketches as references.

== Characters ==
Characters exclusive to Ulica Sezamkowa include:

- Smok Bazyli (Bazyli the Dragon), a jovial, furry dragon.
- Owieczka Beata (Beata the Lamb), a lamb who thinks she knows everything.
- Pędzipotwór (Speed Monster), a turquoise Rosita-like monster who is similar to Cookie Monster, has a big appetite.

== Sezamkowy Zakątek ==
Beginning in 2006, the Polish kids' channel MiniMini began airing a one-hour Sesame programming block, Sezamkowy Zakątek. The original Polish co-production of Sesame Street, Ulica Sezamkowa, is no longer in production.

=== Other languages (Sezamkowy Zakątek) ===
- Croatian: Ulica Sezam
- Czech: Sezamová Ulice
- Hungarian: Szezám Utca
- Italian: Gioca con Sesamo
- Romanian: Stradă Sesame
- Russian: Улица Сезам
- Slovenian: Ulica Sesame
- Ukrainian: Вулиця Сезам
- Uzbek: Sezam Ko'Chasi
