= Sim Sim Hamara =

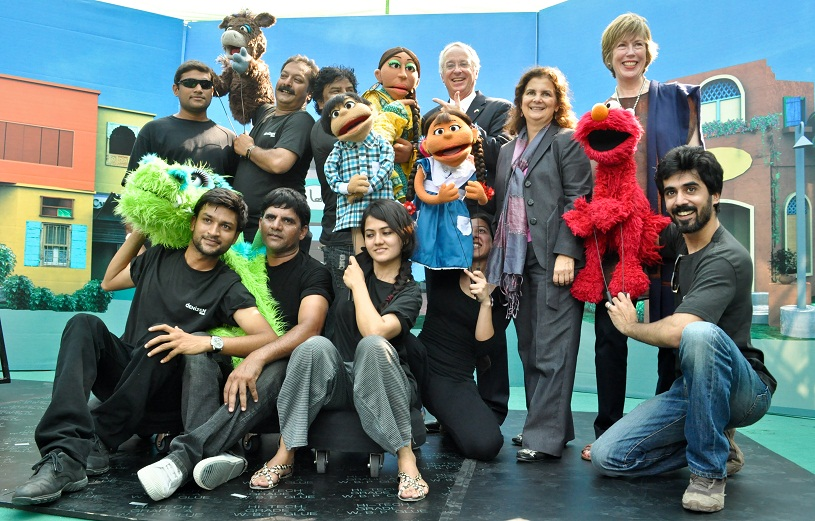
- The show's puppets and presenters
- Country of origin: Pakistan
- Original languages: Urdu and other regional languages

Production
- Production location: Lahore
- Production company: Sesame Workshop

Original release
- Network: PTV
- Release: December 2011

Sim Sim Hamara (Urdu: سِم سِم ہمارا; lit. Our Sim Sim) is the Pakistani version of the children's television series Sesame Street. It is produced by Pakistan Children's Television and Rafi Peer Theatre (based in Lahore).

== History ==
The show has been viewed in Pakistan before, in the early 1990s, although it was in English and the characters and context could only be understood by a westernised minority of Pakistani children.

In April 2011, USAID announced that it would fund $20 million to start a local version of Sesame Street in Pakistan. Sesame Street has had many co-productions around the world and the one in Pakistan is the first localised version in the country itself.

The show began airing in December 2011 on PTV, after two years of production. The first season, consisting of 26 episodes, finished airing in March 2012. 78 half-hour episodes were broadcast in total.

=== Termination of funding ===
In June 2012, it was reported that the US had terminated its funding of the programme. This was later verified by the U.S. Embassy, Islamabad. The decision came after a Pakistani newspaper reported allegations of corruption by Rafi Peer Theatre, although these allegations were denied by the operator of the theatre. At the time, just under $7 million had actually been given to the group. The theatre said they would seek alternative sources of funding to continue the production of the show.

=== 2013–present ===
In 2020 Grover and other Sim Sim Hamara puppets performed at the Rafi Peer 29th International Puppet Festival in Karachi.

== Content ==
The series originally aired in Urdu. Some episodes were later dubbed in Pashto and Punjabi, with plans for translation into Sindhi and Balochi as well.

The program features dubbed segments from Elmo's World and Sesame Street, songs, skits, and a word of the day. Original segments take place in a mock Pakistani town, with a school, dhaba, and Banyan tree.

=== Messaging ===
The aim of the programme is to increase education among children, especially in regards to literacy and maths. The show promotes tolerance, equality, and respect for elders.

== Characters ==
The show includes Elmo (played by Naveed Sabir) and a host of new Pakistani characters. Grover and Abby Cadabby, both originally from the American production, also joined the cast at a later date.

Original muppet characters include:

- Aaina, who is played by Irfan Zahid
- Agarmuch the Magarmuch
- Baily, a donkey who loves making music.
- Baji, a traditional Pakistani woman with a passion for nutrition
- Bhola
- Haseen-o-Jameel: a flamboyant and vain crocodile who lives in a well.
- Master Ji
- Munna, a five-year-old muppet, who is played by Karen Frank.
- Rani, a 6-year-old schoolgirl who is passionate about science and is the captain of her school's cricket team. She is played by Yamina Peerzade.

Human characters include:

- Kiran, the 12-year-old daughter of the village schoolteacher. She is played by Saleha Majeed.

Guests who appeared on the show included Ali Azmat.
