= Sesame Square =

Nigerian children's television show

- Genre: Children's television
- Opening theme: Welcome to Sesame Square
- Country of origin: Nigeria
- Original language: English
- No. of seasons: 3
- No. of episodes: 78

Production
- Producers: Sesame Workshop, Ileke Media

Original release
- Network: Nigerian Television Authority
- Release: 2011 – 2014

Sesame Square is the Nigerian version of Sesame Street. It launched in 2011 as West Africa's first Sesame Street adaptation. Nigerians produce and voice the series in Standard English. It airs on the Nigerian Television Authority network.

It is the second foreign co-production of Sesame Street to be shown entirely in English, the first being Northern Ireland's Sesame Tree.

== Production ==
The series was co-produced by Sesame Workshop and Ileke Media. It was also produced in collaboration with education advisors from Nigeria's Ministries of Health and Education led by the Executive Director of Sesame Square Nigeria Foundation, Ayobisi Osuntusa. Production was challenging as the creators had to balance social norms and traditions of multiple ethnic and religious groups in addition to Sesame Workshop's guidelines. There was also concern that emphasizing diversity over unity might be divisive. English was chosen as the program's main language out of a desire for the show to be "ethnically neutral"; however, Igbo, Hausa, and Yoruba words were taught in some segments.

In 2013 Sesame Workshop was given resources to dub the three seasons of the program into Hausa. 39 episodes were eventually dubbed for the newly-titled Dandalin Sesame, which began airing in late 2015 in several northern states through AREWA24, a Nigerian satellite television channel.

== Characters and location ==
The set of Sesame Square resembles a traditional Nigerian village with a central mango tree.

The series stars Kami, an HIV-positive Muppet (who was originally part of Takalani Sesame, the South African version of Sesame Street), and Zobi, a blue, furry Muppet who is a 'Yam Monster' (the Nigerian version of the Cookie Monster in the American original; Zobi is also a main character of Takalani Sesame, where he is known as Zikwe). Big Bird, Bert, and Ernie, all characters who originated in the American production, also appear. The characters were revoiced, however, to give them Nigerian and American accents.

Guests on the show included Onyeka Onwenu, GT Da Guitarman, and Rooftop MC.

== Content ==
The show is composed of a number of segments. The opening theme tune is "Welcome to Sesame Square" and includes the use of talking drums. Dubbed segments were sourced from Global Grover, Play with Me Sesame, Elmo's World, Bert and Ernie's Great Adventures, and Sesame Street English. Original segments include a Word of the Day segment.

== Messaging ==
In addition to teaching letters and numbers, the show aims to educate children about malaria prevention, promote Nigerian unity through the representation of the diverse groups that make up the country, and to lessen the stigma of being HIV-positive. Girls' education and vaccine education also feature as topics.

Nigeria's Independence Day was featured in episodes from the first and third seasons.

== Episodes ==
The first season contains 26 episodes, one for each letter of the English alphabet. The second season premiered in May 2012 and the third season was broadcast in September 2013. As of 2014 the show had 78 episodes total. As of 2020, USAID had not renewed its financial support of the show, and no further episodes have been produced.

== Reception ==
In 2013 approximately 7.7 million children, aged 3–7, watched the program. That same year, a study by Fluent Research found strong positive correlation between exposure to the show's episodes and materials and "letter naming; following verbal instructions; counting; hand washing; cooperation; and gender equity".

== Bibliography ==
- Moland, Naomi A. (2019). Can Big Bird Fight Terrorism?: Children's Television and Globalized Multicultural Education. New York, NY. ISBN 978-0-19-090395-4. OCLC 1112424155.
