= Kami (Takalani Sesame) =

- Takalani Sesame character
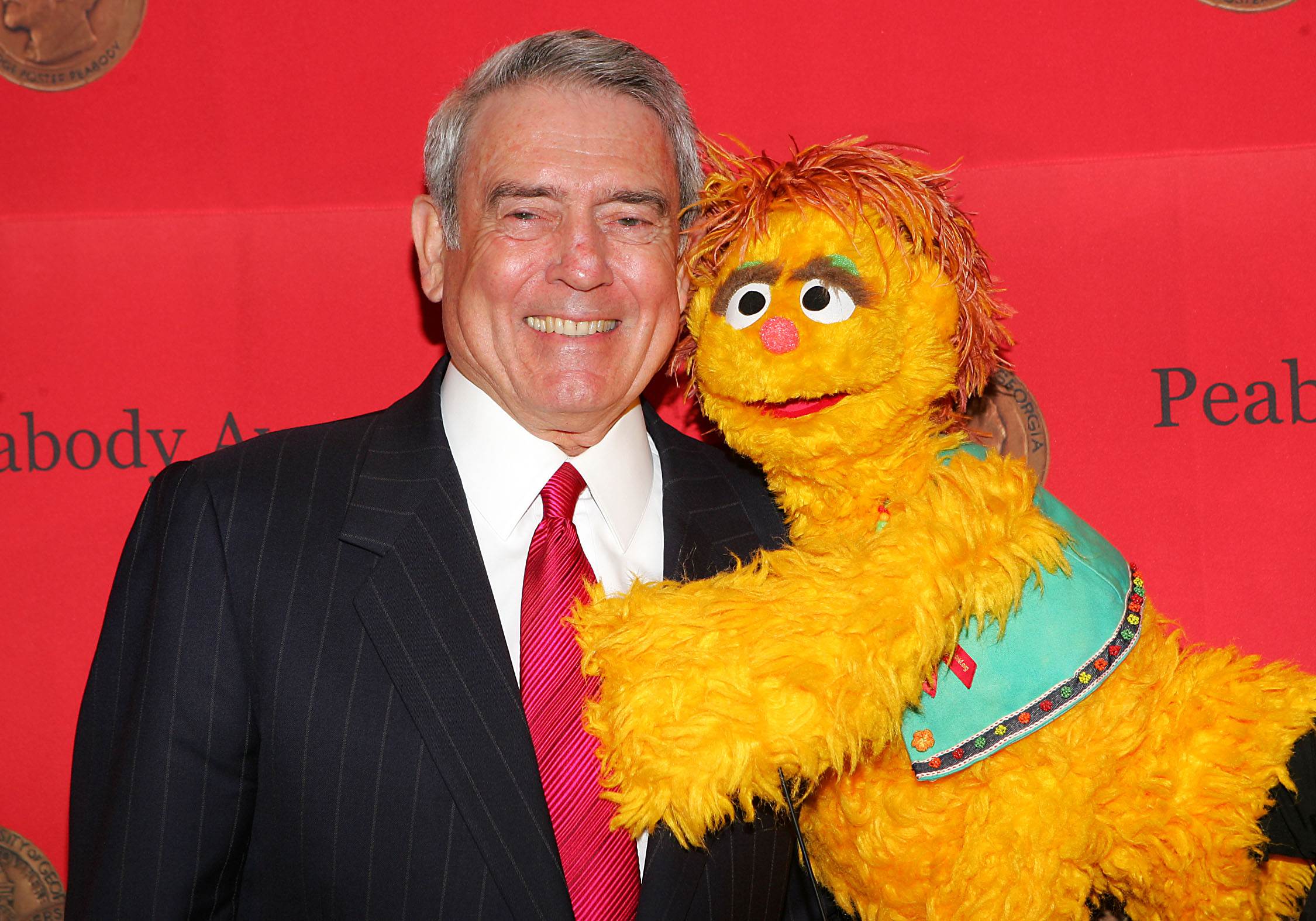
- Kami with Dan Rather (left) at the 2005 Peabody Awards
- First appearance: 2002
- Portrayed by: Zandile Tlale (South Africa, 2002-2003); Nozizwe Zulu (South Africa, since 2004); Fran Brill (several U.S. appearances); Leslie Carrara-Rudolph (US appearance, 2006); Stephanie D'Abruzzo (US appearances, 2011 and 2015)

In-universe information
- Gender: Female

Kami is a character on Takalani Sesame and Sesame Square, the respective South African and Nigerian versions of the children's television program Sesame Street.

In 2002, Sesame Workshop announced that an HIV-positive character would be introduced to Takalani Sesame, the U.S. Agency for International Development–funded South African version of the show. This idea was considered crucial for an area where AIDS is an epidemic. The character's name, Kami, is derived from Kamogelo, which means acceptance or 'a welcoming' in Setswana. Kami is a five-year-old HIV-positive girl Muppet orphaned by AIDS who always has the sniffles; she is yellow and shaggy in appearance. Her backstory is that she contracted the disease as the result of a transfusion of tainted blood received as an infant; her mother also died of HIV/AIDS. Kami illustrates to Takalani's viewers how to deal with loss and sad feelings in a way that three- to seven-year-olds can understand.

Kami was originally presented by Joel Schneider at the 14th International AIDS Conference in Barcelona, Spain, in 2002. Media reports at that time gave many the impression that this character was proposed for the American version of the program; some conservatives vigorously opposed the idea on the grounds that such a character could be "used to teach tolerance and acceptance of homosexuals".

Republican congressmen Billy Tauzin, Chip Pickering, Fred Upton, Joe Barton, Richard Burr and Cliff Stearns also cautioned PBS against introducing similarly affected Muppets to an American audience, reminding PBS that Congress could withhold funding.

Kami has appeared at the United Nations and at the World Bank and was interviewed by Katie Couric on NBC News. Kami was named UNICEF's Champion for Children in November 2003 and has appeared in Takalani segments alongside Desmond Tutu, Nelson Mandela and Bill Clinton, amongst others.
