= Hikayat Simsim =

- حكايات سمسم
- Genre: Children's television
- Inspired by: Sesame Street
- Country of origin: Jordan
- Original language: Arabic
- No. of seasons: 4
- No. of episodes: 104

Production
- Production companies: Sesame Workshop; Jordan Pioneers

Hikayat Simsim (Arabic: حكايات سمسم) is the Jordanian co-production of Sesame Street, which began airing in 2003. It is co-produced by Sesame Workshop and Jordan Pioneers, an Amman-based company.

== History ==
Twenty-six episodes of Hikayat Simsim were initially produced, which began airing in Jordan in October 2003 on Jordan Television, Jordan's public television station. A second season was in production by late 2005 and debuted in January 2007, later followed by a third and fourth season.

A community outreach initiative supplemented the television series.

The project is funded in large part by project partners, including the United States Agency for International Development (USAID), the Bank of Jordan, and ArtVenture.

== Content ==
The program was created, written, and produced by local educators and television professionals.

The show combined segments featuring Muppet characters with animation and live action pieces, which introduced Jordanian children to positive images of themselves and others.

=== Messaging ===
Hikayat Simsim focuses on subjects such as literacy, numeracy, health and hygiene, national identity, needs of Iraqi refugee children, mutual respect, and tolerance. In 2010 the production began incorporating messaging regarding road safety after joining the Global Road Safety Partnership.

== Characters ==
The main Muppet characters in the Jordanian production are Juljul and Tonton. Tonton is a 4-year-old girl who loves soccer and furthers the show's message of girls' empowerment, while Juljul teaches children about computer literacy. Issa Sweidan played the production's grandfather figure, Jiddo Simsim who is also the series' equivalent of Big Bird. This is the only known co-production of Sesame Street to have a live human as the Big Bird counterpart rather than a muppet.

== In other media ==
Tonton was used in early pitches for Ahlan Simsim and made a special appearance in one episode of the show. She was also used for outreach programs for Syrian refugees starting in 2016.
