= Iftah Ya Simsim =

Arabic television series

- The logo of the reboot.
- Opening theme: "Iftah Ya Simsim Theme Song"
- Ending theme: various closing themes
- Countries of origin: Kuwait; United Arab Emirates; Iraq; Morocco; Saudi Arabia
- Original language: Arabic
- No. of episodes: Unknown

Production
- Running time: 28 minutes (Original); 30 minutes / 15 minutes (Revival)
- Production companies: Children's Television Workshop (Original); Bidya Media; Mubdala; Sesame Workshop (Revival)

Original release
- Network: Syndication
- Release: 14 September 1979 – 23 June 1989
- Network: Spacetoon
- Release: 1 September 2015 – 5 September 2019

Iftah Ya Simsim (Arabic: افتح يا سمسم; meaning "Open Sesame") is the first international co-production of the American children's television series Sesame Street created in the Arab world. It premiered in Kuwait and Morocco on September 14, 1979, and was broadcast in 22 Arabic-speaking countries, running until June 23, 1989. The program remained well-known decades after it went off the air.

A few months after its premiere, Iftah Ya Simsim became one of the most popular and successful children's programs in many Arab states. The show inspired many studies, which demonstrated that children benefited from watching it. In 2010, efforts began to revive the show for a new generation of young viewers in the Arab world. In late 2013, fifteen writers and producers from Bidaya Media attended training about its educational methodology and production techniques from the staff of the American show in New York. Iftah Ya Simsim was in pre-production in March 2014, and the first phase of auditions took place in April 2014. The new series debuted on September 1, 2015.

== History ==
A few months after the 1969 debut of Sesame Street on PBS in the US, producers from several countries all around the world approached the Children's Television Workshop (CTW, later the Sesame Workshop, or "the Workshop"), the organization responsible for the show's production, to create and produce versions of Sesame Street in their countries. Co-creator Joan Ganz Cooney was approached by German public television officials about a year after the U.S. version debuted. Many years later, Cooney recalled, "To be frank, I was really surprised, because we thought we were creating the quintessential American show. We thought the Muppets were quintessentially American, and it turns out they're the most international characters ever created". She hired former CBS executive Mike Dann, who left commercial television to become her assistant, as a CTW vice president. One of Dann's tasks was to field offers to produce versions of Sesame Street in other countries. By summer 1970, he had established the first international agreements for what the CTW would come to call "co-productions".

Kuwait's 1980 census, conducted shortly after the original show's premiere, showed that 48% of its citizens were "either totally illiterate or ... barely [able to] read or write". Several studies in Kuwait showed that parents' illiteracy has an adverse effect on their children's educational and social development. Half of the Kuwaitis living in the country's rural areas were illiterate. Literacy rates for women and girls were worse: UNESCO reported in 2005 that they "account for two thirds of the region's illiterates". In 2000, before the revived show aired, the Arab region had some of the world's lowest adult literacy rates, at just over 62%, which was significantly below the world average of 84% and the average in developing countries (almost 76.5%).

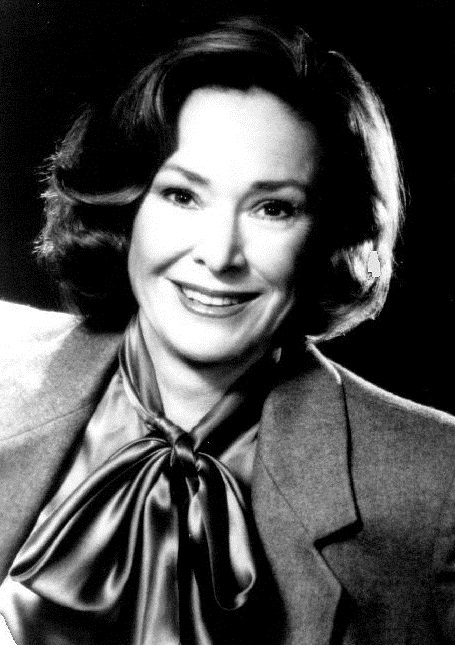
Sesame Street co-creator Joan Ganz Cooney, in 1985. Cooney was surprised that other countries were interested in producing their own versions of the American show.

In 1976, the Arab Fund for Social and Economic Development held a series of workshops and seminars, attended by educators, mass media officers, and social planners. In 1978, educators, mass media officers, and social planners agreed to adopt Sesame Street as a feasible and economical solution for the low preschool attendance. They approached the Children's Television Workshop (CTW), the producers of the American show, and purchased the rights to create an Arab version for US$2.5 million. With funding from the Arab Gulf States Joint Program Production Institution, efforts were made to create a co-production for children in Kuwait and the Arab world. This program, called Iftah Ya Simsim, premiered in Kuwait and Morocco in 1979 and ran until 1989, when the Gulf War stopped production. It was broadcast in 22 Arab countries and remained well-known decades after it went off the air. In June 2010, the Sesame Workshop and the Arab Bureau of Education for the Gulf States (ABEGS), a regional Gulf Cooperation Council (GCC) organization dedicated to education, research, and development, agreed to bring back the show.

== Original series ==
Iftah Ya Simsim was the first children's educational TV program of its kind in the Arab world and the first Sesame Street co-production in the region. It was the first co-production to use Modern Standard Arabic (MSA).

=== Production ===
The series' development was like the American version of Sesame Street in the late 1960s. TThe GCC had considered creating a co-production for many years, so member countries held consultations to determine how to proceed. Many of the early co-productions were simple, dubbed versions with local-language voice-overs and instructional cutaways, but the GCC wanted to create its own original version. The GCC established the Joint Program Production Institute (JPPI) to work with the CTW to create a Sesame Street co-production as well as several children's TV shows. The JPPI formed a team, which visited the CTW in New York to negotiate the production of 130 30-minute programs, purchasing the rights to create an Arab version for US$2.5 million, and bringing in experts from throughout the Arab world "to introduce an all-encompassing Arabic curriculum that would teach and cultivate Arab values and culture".

The production of the show consisted of three stages. The first stage was pre-production research, which identified the basic educational needs of children under the age of six. The second stage involved creating a pilot reel to test the show's effects on children and to be reviewed by educators, sociologists, psychologists, and other experts invited to a seminar. Research began in August 1977; the team was led by an educator and included a linguist and a psychologist, all of whom were faculty members of Kuwait University. The show was tested with children from different socioeconomic groups, aged three to six, in kindergartens and preschools in four representative cities across Arab countries. The team proposed curriculum goals based upon the research, and during a seminar, Arab and CTW educators agreed on ten final goals.

Iftah Ya Simsim premiered in Kuwait and Morocco in September 1979 and was broadcast in all Arabic-speaking countries excluding Egypt.

=== Content ===
Iftah Ya Simsim focused on Arab heritage, like the wedding rituals of countries in the region, and included Arabic poems and songs. It emphasized the importance of scientific thinking and the impact of technology on society. It sought to provide children with experiences that enriched their knowledge of their environment and improved their reasoning skills, through teaching them mathematical and geometric concepts. The show introduced its viewers to Arab history through segments that, for example, showed castles that were the center of historic battles. Geography was highlighted, especially the location of countries and their cities and capitals, which also helped children increase their sense of belonging and pride in their Arab heritage. The program also emphasized children's social awareness, especially their understanding of social roles and their functions.

Unlike the American show, Iftah Ya Simsim covered the topic of spirituality because of the importance of religion in Arab culture, so the producers' goals included teaching children about Islamic principles, positive social behavior, personal manners, and the importance of traits like honesty, respect for parents, loyalty, and social interaction. According to researchers Misbah Al-Khayr and Hashim Al-Samira'i, the program reinforced "the values and ethics that are derived from the teaching of orthodox Islam ... to help children develop a sound moral vision on the basis of which they will build their family relationships, and which will reinforce the values of cooperation, love, and justice". New Muppets were created, inspired by cultural traditions in the Arab world, from the shadow puppets of Syria to the puppets of Egypt, some of the oldest puppets in the world. The show's set consisted of an intricately traditional Arab neighborhood called Sharee Eshreen (20th Street).

The producers wanted to present the characteristics of the Arabic language and its alphabet. Because pre-production research showed that, although many dialects are spoken in the region, 90% of Arab children could understand Modern Standard Arabic (MSA), the show chose it as its language. Linguist Kees Versteegh stated that the language used in Iftah Ya Simsim was "based on an explicit didactic and linguistic concept". The show's developers decided to use specific aspects of the language. Despite the absence of case endings in the dialects spoken by many of its users, the producers used them and other MSA features. They also specified which features should be used sparingly, such as passive verb forms, and which they wanted to avoid completely, including certain prepositions. According to Versteegh, "These principles have been followed rather closely". Children who appeared on the show made few grammatical errors in MSA, and although colloquialisms were used rarely, their conversations and speech patterns had an informal quality. Versteegh postulated that this was due to the use of intonation patterns and interjections, rather than grammatical and lexical items from vernacular use. He also said that Iftah Ya Simsim proved that it was "possible to use an informal register of Modern Standard Arabic". Versteegh reported that although the show was criticized in some Arab countries, particularly Egypt, for containing too many colloquialisms, he thought the criticism was biased and that "the selection of lexical items in any pan-Arabic programme will probably never satisfy everybody".

=== Legacy and influence ===
According to researcher Ibrahim Al-Khulaifi, "In a few months, Iftah Ya Simsim became one of the most popular and successful programs for children in many Arab states". Critics called it "one of the most successful pan-Arab collaborations of educators, creators, writers and artists from the Middle East". The show continued to trigger nostalgia among fans, some of whom watched its reruns well into the 1990s. Rym Ghazal of The National claimed, "No Arabic children's television show was as popular and influential in the Middle East in the 1980s as Iftah Ya Sim Sim...because it offered an alternative way of learning that hardly existed in the Arab world at the time, just as Sesame Street had previously done in the West".

Iftah Ya Simsim inspired "a flood of studies", from scientific research to doctoral or master's theses submitted to Arab, European, and American universities. No studies were conducted during the show's first five years, largely due to a lack of government cooperation and unsuccessful attempts marred by subjects dropping out of the studies. In 1981, however, the JPPI invited children from Arab countries to Kuwait to assess how they assimilated the program. Education, social, and media specialists assessed their attitudes toward the show and found that most viewers benefited from watching it. Parents reported that their children's language use and ability improved, and the JPPI received many letters of appreciation and was commended for their efforts in producing the show. In 1984, in one of the first studies conducted researching the show's effects on its young viewers, Ibrahim Al-Khulaifi compared the relationship between the viewing behavior of Kuwaiti preschoolers of Iftah Ya Simsim and certain developmental and environmental variables. Al-Khulaifi found that variables such as socioeconomic status, parental education (especially the mother's), sex, age, year in school, birth order, and family attitudes about the show influenced the frequency of viewing.

Misbah Al-Khayr and Hashim Al-Samira'i, in a chapter from the 1995 book Children in the Muslim Middle East, reported on a study that sought to evaluate the influence of Iftah Ya Simsim on its Baghdad viewers' knowledge of language, general information, mathematics, science, and moral principles. The study found that 85% of children residing in Baghdad had watched it and that they interacted with and attached themselves to many of its characters, who exposed viewers to regional accents. The most popular segments featured cartoons, songs, and puppets. The show's viewers showed increased understanding and knowledge across all areas, especially about their social and natural environments.

== Revival ==
In 2010, the Sesame Workshop and the Arab Bureau of Education for the Gulf States (ABEGS), which recognized "the deep love for the program" felt throughout the Arab world, started talks about relaunching Iftah Ya Simsim. Pre-production research and preparation took two years. The ABEGS and the Sesame Workshop signed an agreement to revive the series for Arab television, with content suitable for a new generation of children. The show was the first educational initiative sponsored by the Mubadala Development Company, the investment vehicle of the Abu Dhabi government. The production company Bidaya Media was chosen to produce the show; in 2013, the company was housed at Twofour54, the United Arab Emirates version of public television. The show was supported by organizations all over the world; Feras Al-Maddah, Iftah Ya Simsim's representative at the GCC, stated, "It is a public/private sector partnership and we will need the support of all to extend the communication channels and continue producing more educational products". The show was a collaboration between the Abu Dhabi Education Council, Twofour54, Arab Bureau of Education for the Gulf States, and Bidaya Media.

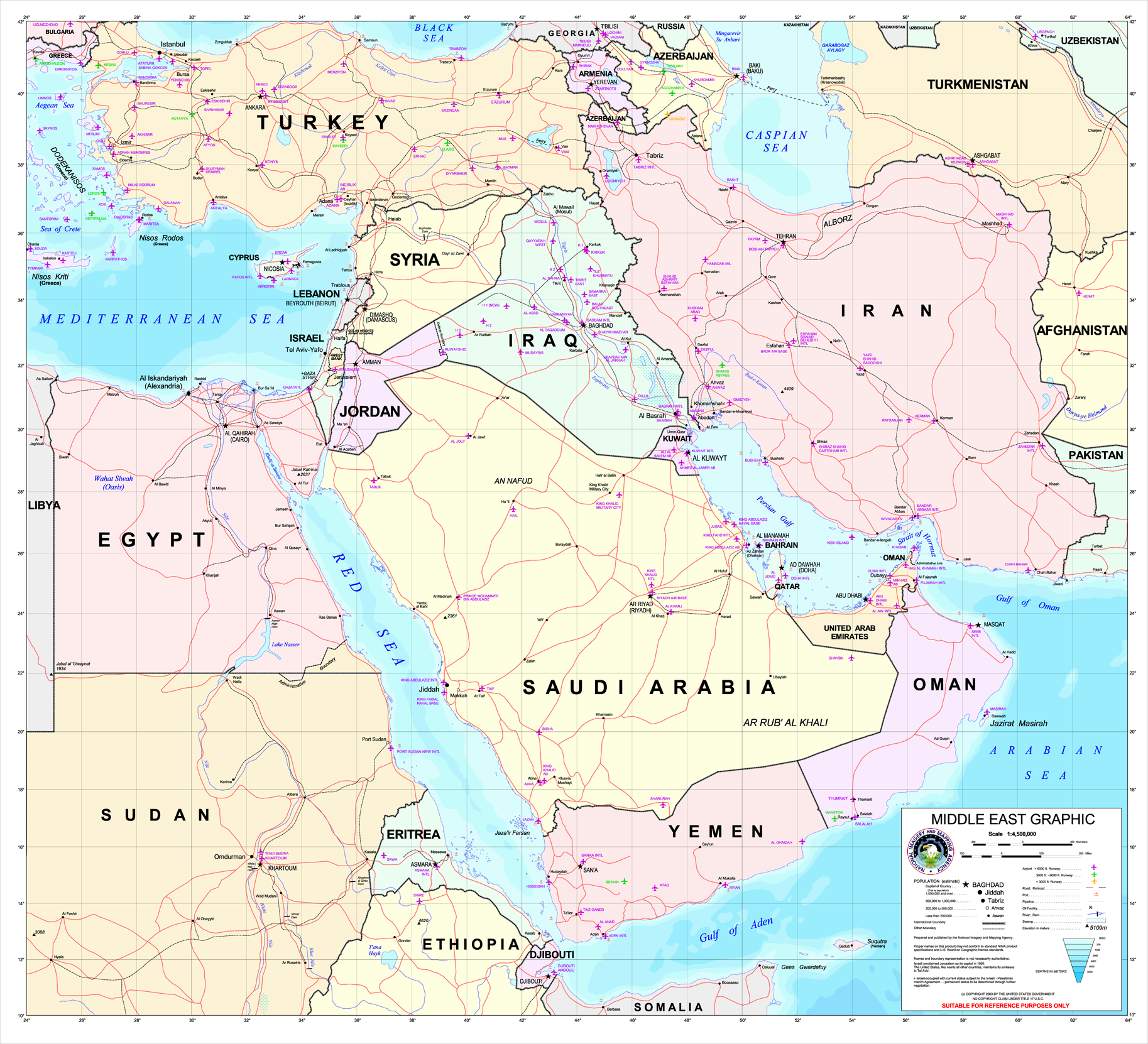
Map of the Middle East, where the original and revived versions of Iftah Ya Simsim were broadcast

A seminar was held in 2011 to design the show's curriculum and educational framework. The seminar, also attended by ABEGS representatives, was sponsored by the GCC Joint Program Production Institution (GCC-JPPI) and Saudi Basic Industries Corporation (SABIC), a manufacturing company based in Riyadh and one of the private corporations that sponsored the new show. The participants considered the educational changes that had occurred in the region over the previous 20 years, including a more diverse and complex world and a need for greater creativity in educating young children. The seminar focused on the education needs of children throughout the Arab world, the possible effects of the show's return, and how to provide educational resources and technology to children in the 21st century. The seminar participants recommended the creation of an advisory council of education experts and media professionals, expanding into new media forms beyond TV, and including prominent Arab celebrities as guests on the show, all components the American show used.

Other curriculum topics chosen during the seminar included Arabic culture and heritage, school readiness, health and wellness, and female education. The seminar participants decided to use MSA, like the producers had done for the original show, citing an even greater need to expose children to the Arabic language. As with the original, outreach was an important part of the new show. Even before the show aired, four characters from the original toured the region, educating young children and their families about road and car safety. The cast and crew took a break from filming for a few months to do "constant live events" and interact with their young viewers. Books, DVDs, CDs, online material, and outreach programs for children, parents, and teachers were produced.

In late 2013, fifteen writers and producers from Bidaya Media attended training about its education methodology and production techniques from the staff of the American show in New York. The Saudi Gazette reported that Iftah Ya Simsim was in pre-production in March 2014, and that the first phase of auditions took place in April 2014, after, according to Al-Sharhan, a year of designing the show, "with input from child development experts, educators and cultural consultants". A casting call for a competitive search of performers specializing in puppeteering, voice, singing, and movement was sent to universities, theaters, and cultural centers in Abu Dhabi, where it was filmed, and through social media. They cast Arabic-speaking performers, although no prior acting experience was required. Dina al Saleh, a puppeteer from Alam Simsim, the Egyptian co-production, screened the first group of candidates, and then the final cast of seven puppeteers were chosen after ten days of workshops with Marty Robinson and other Sesame Workshop puppeteers from New York. According to an editorial in The National, the new version of the show was significant because it encouraged Emiratis and other Arabs to become more involved in filmmaking and, more importantly, it focused on "locally relevant Arabic-language content that will seek to educate present and future generations".

=== Relaunch ===
After a 25-year hiatus, the show was relaunched in September 2015, appearing on nine regional stations. At the time of the relaunch the show was expected to reach 45 million viewers. Along with live shows at schools, the show interacted with fans through Facebook, a YouTube channel, and Instagram accounts. The show announced its focus on regional traditions, culture, values, customs, and manners, with the characters speaking in classical Arabic.

In February 2017, Bidaya Media started production on season two of the relaunch of Iftah Ya Simsim, Noura Sadaka and Natheer Khawaldeh did not return for the new season. In addition, two new Muppets were introduced to the cast, Ka'aki (Cookie Monster) and Elmo. Puppeteer and voice actor Ammar Sabban was hired to replace Natheer Khawaldeh as Gargour and was also chosen to play Ka'aki, and Abdullah Rafa also joined the puppeteer team to play Elmo.

According to Gulf News, Ahlan Simsim, the Arabic language co-production launched in 2020, is an offshoot of Iftah Ya Simsim.

== Episodes ==
=== Series overview ===
Season	Episodes	Originally released	
Season	Episodes	First released	Last released
1	26	February 2, 2020	March 8, 2020
2	26	August 30, 2020	October 4, 2020
3	26	February 28, 2021	2021
4	26	2021	2022
5	26	2022	2022
6	26	2022	2022

== Works cited ==
- Al-Khayr, Misbah; Al-Samira'i, Hashim (1995). "Iftah Ya Simsim (Open Sesame) and Children in Baghdad". In Fernea, Elizabeth Warnock (ed.). Children in the Muslim Middle East. Translated by Sweity, Ahmed. Austin, Texas: University of Texas Press. pp. 464–468. ISBN 0-292-71133-6.
- Al-Khulaifi, Ibrahim Mohammed (1984). An Investigation of the Viewing Behavior toward Iftah Ya Simsim by Kuwaiti Kindergartners (PhD thesis). Ohio State University.
- Cole, Charlotte F.; Richman, Beth A.; McCann Brown, Susan A. (2001). "The World of Sesame Street Research". In Fisch, Shalom M.; Truglio, Rosemarie T. (eds.). "G" is for Growing: Thirty Years of Research on Children and Sesame Street. Mahweh, New Jersey: Lawrence Erlbaum Publishers. pp. 147–180. ISBN 0-8058-3395-1.
- Davis, Michael (2008). Street Gang: The Complete History of Sesame Street. New York: Viking Press. ISBN 978-0-670-01996-0.
- Gikow, Louise A. (2009). Sesame Street: A Celebration—Forty Years of Life on the Street. New York: Black Dog & Leventhal. ISBN 978-1-57912-638-4.
- Hammoud, Hassan R. (2005). "Illiteracy in the Arab world". Literacy for Life: Education for All Global Monitoring Report 2006. UNESCO.
