= The World According to Sesame Street =

- Promotional film poster
- Directed by: Linda Hawkins Costigan; Linda Goldstein-Knowlton
- Written by: Eric Martin; Charlie Pearson
- Starring: Terrence Howard
- Music by: Nathan Wang
- Distributed by: Participant Productions
- Release date: May 21, 2006 (Peñíscola Comedy Film Festival)
- Running time: 104 minutes
- Country: United States
- Language: English

The World According to Sesame Street is a 2006 documentary film created by Participant Productions, looking at the cultural impact of the children's television series Sesame Street, and the complexities of creating international adaptations. It focuses on the adaptations of Sesame Street in Bangladesh (Sisimpur), Kosovo (Rruga Sesam, in Albanian; and Ulica Sezam, in Serbian), and South Africa (Takalani Sesame). The film premiered at the 2006 Sundance Film Festival in the documentary competition.

The film was released on DVD on October 24, 2006. It was also featured that month on the public television documentary series Independent Lens.

The documentary included a segment featuring the introduction of an HIV-positive character on the South African version of Sesame Street, noting the short-lived negative reaction of some members of the U.S. Congress to the character.
