= Susam Sokağı =

- Genre: Children's television
- Country of origin: Turkey
- Original language: Turkish
- No. of seasons: 2
- No. of episodes: 250

Production
- Production companies: Children's Television Workshop; Turkish Radio and Television Corporation

Susam Sokağı is the Turkish co-production of American children's television program Sesame Street. It aired on weekday mornings at 9 am on TRT, the state television in Turkey, in the late 1980s and early 1990s.

== Production ==
The show was coproduced by Children's Television Workshop and Turkish Radio and Television.

Filming began in 1989. Two seasons, for a total of 250 episodes, were filmed. Funding from CTW was $825,000 for the first season and $625,000 for the second season.

== Content ==
The show used an original street design, modeled after a traditional neighborhood, on which to film original content, and also translated and adapted older Sesame Street material.

Content was aimed at preparing children for school, and also included messages related to health and safety. One segment, for example, featured two contenders in a boxing ring who engage in a toothbrushing contest.

== Characters ==
Humans:

- Tahsin Usta: lit. Master Tahsin A repairman and Sabiha Teyze's husband. (Alp Öyken)
- Zehra Teyze: lit. Aunt Zehra A greengrocer. (Güven Hokna)
- Nihat Amca: lit. Uncle Nihat A stationery store owner. (Alpay İzbırak)
- Hakan Abi: lit. Bro. Hakan A young man who plays the guitar in the neighborhood. (Tevfik Tolga Tecer)
- Zeynep Abla: lit. Sis. Zeynep A young woman living in the street. (Aslı Öyken Taylan)
- Sabiha Teyze: lit. Aunt Sabiha A tailor and Tahsin Usta's wife. (Işıl Poyraz)

Muppets:

- Minik Kuş: (played by Hakan Odabaşı) lit. Little Bird Adaptation of Big Bird. He is red in color and is called "little bird" despite his large size.
- Kırpık: (played by Erdinç Doğan) Adaptation of Oscar the Grouch. Lives in a wooden basket larger than the original one.
- Edi ve Büdü: Adaptation of Ernie and Bert. Taken from the idiom "Edi ve Büdü", based on a folktale, which is used for two people getting along well, particularly used for older couples.
- Kurbağacık: lit. Little Froggie Adaptation of Kermit. Kermit's name is Kermit as usual in the Muppet Show episodes shown in Turkey and only adapted into Kurbağacık in Susam Sokağı.
- Kurabiye Canavarı: Adaptation of Cookie Monster.
- Açıkgöz: lit. Alert Adaptation of Grover.
