= Open Sesame (TV series) =

Children's television series

Open Sesame is a children's television series composed solely of the skits and segments of the American television series Sesame Street. While some countries air the American program in whole, and some create their own versions of the show, many more air this title of loosely associated skits, as Open Sesame. The name is a pun based on the magic words "Open sesame" which are used in the legend of Ali Baba.

The first Open Sesame packages debuted in 1975 and 1976, in Spain, Sweden, France, and Montreal, Canada. By 1979, Portugal and Italy had followed suit. Some of these countries, based on the success of the dubbed series, later expanded into co-productions, with varying levels of success by ended in 2011.

== Australia ==
The Australian version of Open Sesame is a half-hour compilation series of Sesame Street sketches, seen on Nick Jr. in Australia. The series follows the same format as other Open Sesame packages, only retaining the original soundtrack.

On March 1, 2004, separate from the package, the Australian Muppet Ollie (who is the cousin of Elmo) appears in Play Along with Ollie interstitials scattered throughout the programming schedule until 2011.

== Greece ==
The Greek version of Open Sesame entitled aired on ERT2 1985–1987; ERT1 1993–2000; Star Channel 2002–2004

== Philippines ==
The Filipino version of Open Sesame entitled "(Tagalized)" aired on ABS-CBN 1990–1991; GMA Network 2000-2001 (Weekends only)

== Earliest known use ==
The earliest seasons of Sesamstrasse, while not officially part of the format, used a variation, but incorporated a greater amount of local film and cartoon inserts.

== Sesamo Apriti ==
Sesamo Apriti (Open Sesame) is the Italian version of Sesame Street, first broadcast in 1971. Approximately 50 episodes of the American show were cut to a half hour, and translated into Italian. A Sesamo Apriti board game and record album were released in 1978.

"Performers" The voices on the series were dubbed into Italian.

Ernesto (Ernie): Dario Mazzoli

Berto (Bert): Loris Gizzi

Bob: Pierluigi Zollo

Maria: Pina Cei

Luis: Guido Celano

Linda: Emy Eco

Susan: Rita Baldini

Kermit: Leonardo Severini, Willy Moser

Pasticcino (Cookie Monster): Franco Latini

Ghiottoncello (?): Edoardo Nevola

Rocco Scirocco (Grover): Fernando Cerulli

Mamma (?): Magda Mercatali

Bingo Rock (?): Edoardo Nevola

== Sesame, otevři se ==
Sesame, otevři se (Open Sesame) is the Czech version of Sesame Street, first broadcast on September 10, 1996.
