= Alam Simsim =

- عالم سمسم
- Country of origin: Egypt
- Original language: Egyptian Arabic

Production
- Running time: 30 minutes
- Production companies: Al Karma Edutainment; Sesame Workshop

Original release
- Release: August 2000 – May 2017

Alam Simsim (Arabic: عالم سمسم) is an Arabic language Egyptian co-production of the children's television series Sesame Street. Alam Simsim is Arabic for "Sesame World".

The show, funded by the U.S. Government's U.S. Agency for International Development (USAID), is a cooperative project between Egypt's AlKarma Edutainment and the USA's Sesame Workshop (formerly Children's Television Workshop).

== Overview ==
The show is set in the imaginary Alam Simsim (Sesame World) neighborhood in Egypt, which looks like a greener version of Old Cairo. The neighborhood is centered on a small public square surrounded by a park. The public square includes a store owned by 'Am Girgas (a Coptic grocer) and a carpenter's shop owned by 'Am Hussein, while the apartments above the stores are occupied by 'Am Hussein's family: his wife, 'Ama Kheireya, his teenage daughter Mona, and his young son Kareem. A nearby library is run by a young woman named Nabila. The humans are referred to as 'Am and 'Ama, which are "Uncle" and "Aunt" in Egyptian Arabic. These titles denote familiarity common in Egyptian neighborhoods.

Alam Simsim reuses sketches from other versions of Sesame Street, which are dubbed into Egyptian Arabic. Segments which include American Muppets change their names: Ernie and Bert are known as Shadi and Hadi, Elmo is called Tohfa (antique), Telly Monster becomes Mosaad, and Grover is called Jafaar. Kermit, however, retains his original name.

== Characters ==
=== Main ===
The show includes three main Muppet characters who interact with the humans in the neighborhood.

- Nimnim ("tiny") is a large green furry creature who wears a cap from upper Egypt and a patterned vest. He is a somewhat gentle and naive creature who enjoys gardening.
- Khokha ("peach") is a furry orange-pink four-year-old monster with long black hair. She is a very inquisitive, imaginative and confident character, created to encourage young girls.
- Filfil ("pepper") is a bearded furry purple monster who often gets carried away with himself. He is a bit egotistical and loves to eat honey-sesame sticks.

=== Guests ===
The show featured several real-life guests in their episodes. Laura Bush and Suzanne Mubarak appeared in a segment with Khokha, which was filmed in 2005.

== Production ==
The show debuted in late 2000, and now has more than 240 episodes. Satellite broadcaster Future Television of Lebanon picked up the show in November 2005, expanding possible viewership to more than 200 million viewers in the Arab States. The series was dubbed into Classical Arabic and local live-action content was filmed for different countries.

== Messaging and impact ==
The show, in addition to teaching basic literacy and mathematics, also focuses on regional issues, including gender equality, girls' education, and health and hygiene. In addition, the program showcases Egyptian culture and communities, including Christian and Muslim celebrations. In 2006 AlKarma Edutainment worked with Johns Hopkins University Center for Communication Programs to create public service announcements featuring the Alam Simsim characters to raise awareness about avian influenza and how to avoid contracting it.

Studies have found that children who watch the program do show improvement in literacy and math skills, and caregivers who watch the program show some modifications in their parenting styles. Viewership is also correlated with gender-equitable views and with girls' interest in education and professional careers. A 2013 study found that children's exposure to the program was significantly associated with learning.

== Reception ==
The show became very popular in Egypt after Suzanne Mubarak, Egypt's First Lady, became involved with the program in 2000. 98% of Egyptian households were viewing the program by 2001.

== Outreach initiative ==
In December 2002 Sesame Workshop began an outreach initiative to further the show's educational impact. This initiative was more geared toward parents and caregivers, and focused on health, hygiene, and nutrition. Materials included flashcards, story booklets, and calendars.

According to a 2004 study, the initiative had a substantial positive impact on caregivers, especially when it came to knowledge about hygiene and vaccines. However, many of the families involves in the initiative and in the study were poorer, and thus were not able to actually implement some of the changes they had learned about, such as buying toothbrushes or fresh produce. There was also a positive impact found on the children in the initiative, who reported more frequent hand and face washing.
