= Play with Me Sesame =

2002 American children's television series

- Title card
- Genre: Children's television series
- Based on: Sesame Street by Joan Ganz Cooney and Lloyd Morrisett
- Developed by: Jocelyn Hassenfeld; Karen Kuflik
- Presented by: Steve Whitmire; Eric Jacobson; Fran Brill; David Rudman; John Tartaglia; Martin P. Robinson
- Theme music composer: Joe Raposo
- Opening theme: "Somebody Come and Play"
- Ending theme: "Somebody Come and Play" (instrumental)
- Composers: Michael Ungar; Russell Velazquez
- Country of origin: United States
- Original language: English
- No. of seasons: 3
- No. of episodes: 69 (Noggin); 104 (international/Sprout)

Production
- Producers: Jocelyn Hassenfeld; Karen Kuflik; Alyssa Cooper; Dana Greengross
- Production locations: Kaufman Astoria Studios, New York
- Camera setup: Videotape, Multi-camera
- Running time: 24 minutes
- Production companies: Nick Digital (seasons 1-2); Noggin LLC (seasons 1-2); Sesame Workshop

Original release
- Network: Noggin
- Release: April 1, 2002 – September 2, 2007

Related
- Sesame Street; Elmo's World

Play with Me Sesame is an American children's television series, created by Sesame Workshop and Nickelodeon for their former joint venture Noggin. It is a spin-off of Sesame Street hosted by Ernie, Bert, Prairie Dawn, and Grover. The series' backgrounds and animated elements were made by Nickelodeon Digital in New York City. Nickelodeon and Sesame Workshop developed the show to expand on Sesame Street by directly encouraging young viewers to interact with the characters. The series combines classic Sesame Street sketches with new segments, where the hosts invite preschoolers to join them in games.

The show began development in 1999, when the Jim Henson Company still co-owned the rights to the Sesame characters. To start production, Nickelodeon had to seek approval from Henson. Kidscreen reported that "the series marks the first time a State-side entity other than Sesame Workshop has been given permission by Henson to use the Sesame Street Muppets." Noggin shot footage of the characters on a green screen, and animators at Nick Digital added in new graphics. Many of the background designs in Play with Me Sesame were simultaneously used in Nickelodeon's Moose and Zee interstitials.

Play with Me Sesame premiered on April 1, 2002 and ran for three seasons. The show was heavily linked with Noggin's website, featuring a regular segment where computer games from the site were played. At its launch, it was announced that Play with Me Sesame would continue to be produced for Noggin through 2009, but the show instead wrapped in 2007. It last aired on Noggin on September 2, 2007. Reruns moved to PBS Kids Sprout, where it aired until December 31, 2015.

== History ==
=== Production ===
Play with Me Sesame was the first long-form preschool series created by and for Noggin. The show encourages its young viewers to join in on the movement and learning they see onscreen, making television an active experience rather than a passive one. The format was meant to mimic a child's playdate. Tom Ascheim, one of the show's producers and the general manager of Noggin, said "all the things kids do—running around, coloring, playing computer games—are funneled into the experience."

The show's backgrounds and animated elements were created at Nickelodeon Digital in New York. These include the title sequence, the Sesame Computer game segments, and the background designs. The background designs, many of which resemble a child's crayon drawings, are the same ones featured in Noggin's Moose and Zee interstitials. Some of the designs (such as a lion, a dinosaur, and a bird) were featured as part of Noggin's channel logo, both in promotions for Play with Me Sesame and in general use. Sesame Workshop lists Nickelodeon Animation Studio and its former name, Games Productions, as a "project partner" for the series.

The third season's credits list Nickelodeon's parent company, Viacom, as the owner of the "Play with Me" trademark. Play with Me Sesame is unique in that it was a specially made co-production of Nickelodeon and Sesame Workshop, rather than a syndication package like Noggin's previous collections of Sesame Street segments.

=== Broadcast ===
Nickelodeon extensively promoted the launch of Play with Me Sesame in 2002. Their marketing team created a 40-second promo for Noggin featuring Grover and called the "Grover Song," as a sample of the Play with Me Sesame format. In the promo, Play with Me Sesame is highlighted as the main attraction of Noggin's lineup, and Grover encourages the viewer in song to play along with Noggin's shows. The promo was aired across all of Nickelodeon's networks throughout spring 2002. In July 2003, the "Grover Song" promo won a Mark Award for brand image and awareness.

The show premiered on April 1, 2002. Its premiere was part of a major rebranding of Noggin. When the show's first season was airing, it was Noggin's only original half-hour show for preschoolers; all others were short-form interstitials or simply reruns from Nickelodeon and Sesame's archives. In 2003, the Los Angeles Times wrote that Noggin "filled its days with old episodes of Sesame Street, several Nick Jr. shows and one new series, Play With Me Sesame."

=== Live show ===
Grover, Bert and Ernie in the live adaptation.

On April 6, 2002, MTV Networks launched a live version of the Play with Me Sesame series. It featured walk-around characters of Bert, Ernie, and Grover performing interactive skits and songs from the show. Marketed as Noggin's Play with Me Sesame Mall Tour, the live show was presented at malls in nine cities. It became a finalist in the 2003 Beacon Awards and received national coverage on CBS's news program The Early Show.

Tom Ascheim said, "We are very excited to bring Play with Me Sesame to local markets across the US...Play with Me Sesame gives kids a whole new way to Sesame with their favorite characters—Bert, Ernie and Grover—and we are confident it will be a hit on Noggin and in the malls."

== Cast ==
- Fran Brill as Prairie Dawn (Seasons 1–3) and Zoe (Season 2)
- Steve Whitmire as Ernie (Seasons 1 and 3)
- John Tartaglia as Additional Puppeteer (Season 1) and Ernie (Season 2)
- Eric Jacobson as Bert and Grover (Seasons 1–3)
- David Rudman as Cookie Monster, Chicago the Lion and Ernestine (Season 2)
- Martin P. Robinson as Slimey the Worm (Season 2)

Pam Arciero, Lisa Buckley, Tyler Bunch, Jim Martin, Carmen Osbahr, and Matt Vogel are also credited as additional puppeteers. The classic Muppet footage features performances by a wide variety of Muppet performers, but they are not listed in the credits.

== Reception ==
Nancy Davis Kho of Common Sense Media said that the show "exhibits the high-quality, thoughtful programming that parents have come to expect from Sesame Street," while also taking note that "a smattering of more sophisticated humor in the dialog is a nod to the parents who will likely be watching."

== VHS and DVD releases ==
The series' episodes were released onto DVD in the end of 2007 by Genius Entertainment. In Australia and Oceanic territories, the show was released on VHS and DVD by Australian Broadcasting Corporation and Roadshow Entertainment.

- Animals Everywhere (2005)
- Playtime with Grover (2005)
- Head, Shoulders, Fur and Toes (2005)
- Playtime with Ernie (2005)
- Playtime with Bert (2005)
- Sing with Me (2005)
- Furry, Fun and Healthy Too (2006)
- Playtime with Prairie Dawn (2006)
- Good Night Sesame (2006)
- Imagine with Me (2006)
- Let's Play Games (2006)
- Happy, Sad, Proud and Mad (2006)
