= List of Sesame Street puppeteers =

This list of Sesame Street puppeteers includes all who have worked on the show, as a regular, backup, guest puppeteer, etc., and by no means should be taken as complete, as many Muppeteers only have done one skit on the show, and thus are not credited.

== Jim Henson’s Muppets ==
- Pam Arciero: (1984–present)

Grundgetta, Crystal of the Squirrelles (puppeteering only), Mae (2005), Black and White Moo Wave Cow, Nani Bird, Various

- Heather Asch: (2006–2009; 2019)

Hansel (2006), Various

- Billy Barkhurst: (2009–2018)

Ernie (voice for Sesame Street Live shows (2009–2014); regular performer (2014–2018))

- Jennifer Barnhart: (2003–present)

Zoe (2016–present), Gladys the Cow (2003–present), Mama Bear (2003–present), Francine Lloyd Wright, Granny Snuffle, Goldilocks (2005), Super Chicken (2005), Granny Bird (2018–present), Mommy Snuffleupagus (2000s), Various

- Bill Barretta: (2001–2010)

Louie, Various

- Cheryl Blaylock: (1979–1984; 1990–present)

Mona Monster, Cookie Monster's Grandma (1982), Forgetful Jones' Mother and Forgetful Jones' cousin, Various

- Camille Bonora: (1987–1996)

Meryl Sheep, Ruby, Clementine (1987–1992), Goldilocks (1991–1996), Mama Bear (1993–1996), Gladys the Cow (1992-1996), Juliet, Loretta, Stella, Countess von Backwards (1990), Ingrid (Anything Muppet), Velma the Grouch, Grandma Count, Herry Monster's Mother (1993), Polly Darton (1990), Various

- Rickey Boyd: (2006–2013)

The Twiddlebugs (voices for CGI segments), Cookie Monster's Grandmother

- Fran Brill: (1970–2015)

Prairie Dawn (1970–2015), Zoe (1993–2015), Betty Lou (1970–1984), Little Bird, Roxie Marie, Polly Darton, Mrs. Crustworthy, Wanda Cousteau, Countess von Backwards (1994–2005), Nora Nicks, Helena, Goldilocks (2007), Mae (2006–2015), Gladys the Cow (1996-2003), Various

- Lisa Buckley: (1993–2008; 2019)

Betty Lou (1993–1998), Darlene of the Squirrelles, Various

- Julianne Buescher: (1991–1995; 2001-2020)

Sherry Netherland (1993–1995), Betty Lou's Mommy, Mama Countess, Sophie (1995), Various

- Warrick Brownlow-Pike: (2017–present)

Gonger, Various

- Tyler Bunch: (1993–present)

Louie (2007–present), Mr. Can You Guess, Big Bad Wolf (2007–2013), Super Chicken (2008), Various

- Northern Calloway:

Same Sound Brown, The Hipster, Various

- Leslie Carrara-Rudolph: (2006–present)

Abby Cadabby, Goldilocks (2012–present), Rosa, Rose, Gretel (2006), Velvet, Mae (2006), Baby Natasha (2014–present), Various

- Christopher Cerf: (1973–2012) (voice only)

Little Chrissy, Bruce Stringbean, Mick Swagger, lead Frazzletone, Chrissy from Little Jerry and the Monotones, Captain ("Imagine That"), How Now Brown, Various

- Ivy Austin: (1982-2008)

Sooey Oinker, Cereal Girl, Various

- Kevin Clash: (1980; 1984–2013)

Elmo (1985–2012), Hoots the Owl (1985–2012), Baby Natasha (1989-2012), Benny Rabbit (1990-2007), Wolfgang the Seal, Kingston Livingston III, The Grand High Triangle Lover, Clementine (1985–1987), Dr. Nobel Price (1984–1988), Chip Cat, Ferlinghetti Donizetti (1984–1986), Mel, Big Bad Wolf (1980s—2008), Preposterous, Watson, Segi (puppetry), Mario, Professor D. Rabbit, Dexter (head), J. P., Baby Fats Domino, Oliver, Gus, Warren Wolf, Buster the Horse (1980), Sophie (1985), Big Jeffy (1988), Cookie Monster's Mommy (2004), One of the Fuzzy Funk, One of the Git Along Little Doggies, One of the Rockheads, Various

- R. Bruce Connelly: (1993–present)

Barkley, Various

- Frankie Cordero: (2016–present)

Rudy, Various

- Austin Michael Costello: (2016–present)

Assistant puppeteer

- Melissa Creighton: (2007–2010; 2014–present)

Various

- Stephanie D'Abruzzo: (1993–present)

Prairie Dawn (2016–present), Curly Bear, Mae (2004; 2019–present), Lulu, Elizabeth, Mrs. Crustworthy (2016–present), Googel, Cookie Monster's Mommy (2016), Grover's Mommy (2001; 2016), Herry Monster's Mother (1998), Diva D'Abruzzo, Various

- Dorien Davies: (2017–present)

Various

- Emilio Delgado: (2005)

Rosita's Abuela

- Ryan Dillon: (2005–present)

Elmo (2013–present), Roosevelt Franklin (puppetry - 2019–present), Lefty the Salesman (2019–present), Don Music (2019–present), Dr. Nobel Price (2019), Various

- Alice Dinnean Vernon: (1994–2009; 2019)

Mama Bear (1996–2002), Goldilocks (1996–2004), Sherry Netherland (1995–1998), Little Murray Sparkles, Loretta (1996–1998), Phoebe (2001–2002), Various

- Michael Earl: (1978–1981; 2007-2009)

Snuffy, Poco Loco, Leslie Mostly, Slimey the Worm, Forgetful Jones, Cowboy X, Sullivan, Tarnish Brother, Various

- Artie Esposito: (2007)

Various

- Olga Felgemacher: (1977–1979)

Mrs. Bolinski, Various

- Michael Frith: (1987-1999; 2003-2009)

Various

- Peter Friedman: (1976–1978)

Mr. Snuffleupagus (back end), Two-Headed Monster (right head (1978) debut sketch), Various

- Fred "Garbo" Garver: (1984–1993)

Barkley, Dexter (hands), Garbo Gorilla, Various

- Dave Goelz: (1992–2011; 2019)

Various

- Louise Gold: (1991–1996)

Sally Messy Yuckyael, Loretta (1993), Various

- Stacey Gordon: (2017–present)

Julia

- Tim Gosley: (1985-1990)

Mr. Honker (Follow That Bird), Various

- Liz Hara: (2016–present)

Gladys the Cow (2021–present), Various

- James Godwin (1995-2011; 2019)

Various

- Chris Hayes: (2017–present)

Hoots the Owl, Various

- Andy Hayward: (2007)

Various

- Terri Hardin (2000-2004; 2009)

Various

- Brian Henson: (1998-2013)

Various

- Jane Henson: (1973–1974)

Various

- Jim Henson: (1969–1990; credited up until 2002)

Ernie (1969–1990), Kermit the Frog (1969–1990), Guy Smiley (1969–1990), Little Chrissy (puppetry), Bip Bippadotta, Thomas Twiddlebug, Sinister Sam, Bad Bart, Little Bird (1969), Granny Fanny Nesselrode (1970; 1972), Spaceship Surprise Captain, The Genie (1973), Barry Rhymie (1978), Captain Vegetable (debut sketch), Charlie (occasionally), Yip Yip Martian, Two-Headed Monster's Mother, Harvey Monster (occasionally), Beautiful Day Monster, Various

- Richard Hunt: (1972–1992; credited up until 2000)

Two-Headed Monster (right half) (1978-1992), Forgetful Jones (1981–1991), Gladys the Cow (1972-1992), Sully, Don Music, Placido Flamingo, Elmo (1984–1985), Sonny Friendly (1986-1992), Ferlinghetti Donizietti (1980–1984), Aristotle, Leo the Party Monster, Dip Cat, Brad, Timmy Twiddlebug, Captain Vegetable, Gilbert, Dr. Kvetch, Richard, Zero, Spaceship Surprise Mate, Worby the Grouch, Earl, Green Alphabeat, The Beetles' Lead Singer, Tarnish Brother, Grandpa Count, Grandpa Grouch, Larry Rhymie (1978), Mrs. Bolinski (1982), Tough Eddie (1984), Frazzle (1989), Harvey Monster (occasionally), Maurice Monster (occasionally), Yip Yip Martian, Mr. Snuffleupagus (back half, 1970s), Slimey the Worm (1978), Duke, One of the Rockheads, Various

- Michael Elizabeth Huston: (1986–1987)

Juliet, Various

- Eric Jacobson: (1994–present)

Grover (1998–present), Bert (1998–present), Oscar the Grouch (2015–present), Guy Smiley (2005–present), Two-Headed Monster (left half) (2016–present), Harvey Kneeslapper (2019), Various

- Haley Jenkins: (2014–present)

Mama Bear (2019–present), Karli, Various

- Frank Kane: (1979)

Mr. Snuffleupagus (back end)

- John Kennedy: (1993–present)

The Amazing Mumford (2004; 2018–present), Various

- Kathleen Kim: (2016–present)

Elena, Betty Lou (2017–present), Various

- Donna Kimball (2004-2016; 2019)

Various

- Jim Kroupa: (1983–2000)

One of the Rockheads, Various

- Sonia Manzano: (1973; 2013–2014)

Smart Tina (1973), Rosita's Abuela (2013–2014)

- Tim Lagasse: (1998–2016; 2019–present)

Various

- Peter Linz: (1991–present)

Ernie (2017–present), Herry Monster (2017–present), Osvaldo, el Gruñón, Timmy Twiddlebug, Samuel, Hansel (2005), Elmo (voice only, Spaghetti Space Chase grand opening ceremony) (2013), Captain Vegetable (2019), Various

- Loretta Long: (1969–1970; 1975)

Roosevelt Franklin's Mother (voice only), Piccolo player (voice only; "I Am a Fine Musician"), Suzetta Something, Various

- Spencer Lott: (2016–present)

Samuel, Various.

- Sarah Lyle: (2008-2011)

Maisie Weatherberry and Samson Bookworm (series 2 on Sesame Tree)

- Rick Lyon: (1988–2008)

Various

- Peter MacKennan: (1987–1994)

Various

- Lara MacLean: (2001–present)

Zoe (2020–present), Various

- Noel MacNeal: (1983–present)

Daddy Snuffle, Mommy Snuffleupagus (1980s–1990s), Granny Snuffle (occasionally), Gretel (2005–2006), Smiley (2014-present), Various

- Amanda Maddock (2006–2007)

Mary, Various

- Jim Martin (1989–2013; 2019)

Preston Rabbit, Lassie, Irvine (1991), Betty Lou's Dad, Various

- Drew Massey: (2011–present)

Various

- Joey Mazzarino: (1990–2015)

Murray Monster, Papa Bear, Two-Headed Monster (left head) (2001–2016), Horatio the Elephant, Stinky the Stinkweed, Ingrid, Narf, Joey Monkey, Merry Monster, Colambo, Baby Tooth, Bernie Broccoli, The Fairy Godperson, Cousin Bear, Figby, The Tooth Fairy, Cyranose de Bergerac (2007), Frazzle (2014), The Big Bad Wolf (occasionally), Various

- Paul McGinnis: (2007–present)

Various

- Tracie Mick: (2007–present)

Zoe (puppetry only), Prairie Dawn (puppetry only), Tina, Various

- Alison Mork: (1991–1993; 2009)

Various

- Brian Muehl: (1978–1984; 1988; 1993–1994; 2009-2019)

Barkley (1978–1984; 1987), Telly Monster (1980–1984), Elmo (1980–1984), Dr. Nobel Price, Grundgetta (1980–1984), Clementine, Pearl, Rusty, Alphabet Bates, Tarnish Brother, Gilbert (1980), One of the Rockheads, Various

- Kathryn Mullen: (1978–1994)

Grover's Mommy (1981), proto-Elmo (1981), Telly's Mom, Various

- Jerry Nelson: (1970–2012)

Count von Count (1972–2012), Mr. Snuffleupagus (1971–1978), Herry Monster (1970–2003), Mr. Johnson (1971–2012), Two-Headed Monster (left half) (1978–2000), The Amazing Mumford (1970–2011), Biff, Sherlock Hemlock, Little Jerry, Frazzle, Fred the Wonder Horse, Farley, Simon Soundman, Sam the Robot (occasionally), Herbert Birdsfoot, Big Bad Wolf (1971–2012), Poco Loco (1974–1976), Tina Twiddlebug, Rodeo Rosie, Mr. Chatterly, Noel Cowherd, Phil Harmonic, Sir John Feelgood, Tough Eddie, Cyranose de Bergerac, H. Ross Parrot, Japanese Storyteller, The Genie, Ernest the Grouch, Granny Grouch, Lefty's Boss, Marty, Joe Busby, Jack Be Nimble, Lord Hog, Vern, Cousin Monster, Jackman Wolf, Mary Rhymie (1978), Barry Rhymie (1980), Dr. Kvetch (1997), Cookie Monster's Pop, Cookie Monster's Sister, Charlie (occasionally), Harvey Monster (occasionally), Tarnish Brother, Mommy Snuffleupagus (1970s), proto-Elmo (1980), Yip Yip Martian, Officer Krupky (Episode 0441), Various

- Carmen Osbahr: (1990–present)

Rosita, Ovejita, Various

- Frank Oz: (1969–2000; occasionally - 2001–2013)

Bert (1969–2000; occasionally - 2003–2006), Cookie Monster (1969–2000; occasionally - 2001–2004), Grover (1969–2000; occasionally - 2002–2012), Roosevelt Franklin (puppetry), Harvey Kneeslapper, Lefty the Salesman, Professor Hastings, Tessie Twiddlebug (1974–1982), Prince Charming, Rufus, Officer Krupky (Episode 0581), Moe Busby, Beautiful Day Monster, Bart, Betty Lou (1969–1970), Charlie (occasionally), Harvey Monster (occasionally), Tarnish Brother, Larry Rhymie (1980), Various

- Bob Payne: (1978–1980)

Telly Monster (1979 debut), Georgie, Slimey the Worm (1978), Mary Rhymie (1980), Various

- Annie Peterle: (2008)

Various

- Karen Prell: (1979–1981; 2003; 2019–2020)

Deena, Masha, Various

- Gord Robertson (1985-2002)

Daddy Dodo (puppeteer), Various on Sesame Park

- Martin P. Robinson: (1981–present)

Snuffy (1981–present), Telly Monster (1984–present), Slimey the Worm, Fluffy, Buster the Horse, Irvine, Monty, Vincent Twice, Mrs. Grouch, Sullivan, Shelley the Turtle, Old MacDonald, Dicky Tick, Ralphie, Tito, Otto the Grouch, Earl (1995), Bart (2017), Mommy Snuffleupagus (1980s), Freddy (2018), Big Bad Wolf (occasionally), One of the Rockheads, Various

- Matt Robinson (1970-1975)

Roosevelt Franklin (voice only)

- David Rudman: (1986–present)

Cookie Monster (2001–present), Baby Bear, Two-Headed Monster (right half) (1998–present), Humphrey, Chicago the Lion, Davey Monkey, Athena, Flo Bear, Sully (1993–1999, 2020–present), Sonny Friendly (1992–2000), Tessie Twiddlebug (1987–1996), Norman, Dr. Edwynn, Ernestine, Rudder Rabbit, Velma Blank, Duane, Tyrone, Freddy (2017), One of the Fuzzy Funk, One of the Git Along Little Doggies, Granny Snuffle (1989), Dip Cat (1992), Cookie Monster's Grandma (1994), Mommy Snuffleupagus (1990s), Yip Yip Martian, Various

- Daniel Seagren: (1969–1978)

Big Bird (occasionally), Guy Smiley (debut sketch), Various

- Judy Sladky: (1987–2010)

Alice Snuffleupagus

- Caroll Spinney: (1969–2018)

Big Bird, Oscar the Grouch, Bruno the Trashman, Granny Bird, Granny Fanny Nesselrode, Sam the Robot (occasionally), Shivers the Penguin, Lefty the Salesman (occasionally - 1970), proto-Cookie Monster (1970 sketch), proto-Grover (1970 sketch), Beautiful Day Monster, Various

- David Stephens: (2008)

Various

- Andy Stone: (1999; 2003; 2007)

Various

- John Tartaglia: (1994–2016)

Alfred Duck, Ernie (Play with Me Sesame, Sesame Street 4-D Magic - 2003), Phoebe (2002), Cookie Monster's Mommy (in Episode 4059), Yip Yip Martian, Various

- Toby Towson: (1978)

Barkley

- Allan Trautman: (2002–2010; 2019)

Various

- Gabriel Velez: (1984–1985; 1998; 2007; 2017-present)

Osvaldo, el Gruñón, Dani

- Matt Vogel: (1997–present)

Big Bird (1997–present), Count von Count (2013–present), Mr. Johnson (2014–present), Herb, Hansel (2006–present), Harvey Kneeslapper (2010), Forgetful Jones (2012; 2019), The Big Bad Wolf (2013), Kermit the Frog (2019), Sherlock Hemlock (2019), Biff (2020–present), Various

- Julie Westwood: (2015-2017)

Bebe (from The Furchester Hotel)

- Steve Whitmire: (1993–2014)

Ernie, Kermit the Frog, Dr. Feel, Various

- Caroly Wilcox: (1969–1977)

Various

- Victor Yerrid: (1998-2010; 2019)

Various

- Bryant Young: (1979–present)

Snuffy (back end)
