= Bert and Ernie's Great Adventures =

- Also known as: The Adventures of Bert and Ernie
- Genre: Children's television series Animation; Clay animation
- Based on: Bert and Ernie by Sesame Street
- Starring: Eric Jacobson; Steve Whitmire; Stephanie D'Abruzzo; Joey Mazzarino; Tyler Bunch; Kevin Clash
- Countries of origin: United States; Italy
- No. of seasons: 2
- No. of episodes: 52

Production
- Running time: 4-5 minutes
- Production companies: Sesame Workshop; Misseri Studio

Original release
- Network: PBS Kids (during Sesame Street, United States); KI.KA (Germany); Milkshake! (UK)
- Release: August 11, 2008 – December 30, 2010

Related
- Sesame Street; Elmo's World; Play with Me Sesame; Sesame Beginnings; Elmo the Musical; The Furchester Hotel; Abby's Flying Fairy School; The Not-Too-Late Show with Elmo; Mecha Builders; Super Grover 2.0

Bert and Ernie's Great Adventures, originally promoted as The Adventures of Bert and Ernie, is a claymation animated children's television series and segment on Sesame Street in which Bert and Ernie used their imaginations to travel to faraway places. The series was produced by Sesame Workshop in co-production with Misseri Studio, Norddeutscher Rundfunk and Channel 5 Broadcasting Limited, and aired from August 2008 to December 2010, with two seasons and 52 episodes.

The shorts aired in the United States as inserts on Sesame Street beginning with season 39 and internationally as a standalone series in various overseas markets, with the first season debuting in September 2008. The episode "Secret Agents" won the Gold Award in the Children's Animation category at the 2009 World Media Festival, and the series was a nominee at the 2009 Annecy Animation Festival.

== Format ==
Each episode begins with Bert and Ernie getting ready for bed when Bert's bed comes to life and flies out of their apartment, taking them on a new adventure. Sometimes accompanied by Bert's pigeon friend Bernice or Ernie's toy rubber duck, they also make new friends and enemies during their adventures.

== Voices ==
- Eric Jacobson as Bert
- Steve Whitmire as Ernie
- Stephanie D'Abruzzo as various characters
- Joey Mazzarino as various characters
- Tyler Bunch as various characters
- Kevin Clash as Elmo

== Episodes ==
=== Season 1 (2008) ===
1. "Tiny Town" (August 11, 2008): Bert and Ernie end up in Tiny Town, where they are tiny and everything around them is humongous. They have fun with a remote control car and a frisky puppy.
2. "Pirates" (August 13, 2008): Bert and Ernie are pirates looking for treasure. They land on an island with a monkey that steals Bert's map. The only way they had to get it back is to swap clothes.
3. "Planet Bert" (August 18, 2008): Bert and Ernie are astronauts and land on Planet Bert, a planet where it's inhabited by Bert-looking creatures that like pigeons like Bert.
4. "Bakers" (September 24, 2008): Bert and Ernie are bakers and a mouse named Big Bob orders a chocolate surprise. Bert and Ernie had to work together in order to make it.
5. "Cavemen" (October 2, 2008): Bert and Ernie are cavemen, searching for food, they find an egg and try to cook it, but soon regrets it when it's a dinosaur egg.
6. "Rainforest" (October 10, 2008): Bert and Ernie are ecologists to help animals' lives. They come across a beaver trying to build a grand opera house by gnawing all the trees.
7. "Penguin" (October 20, 2008): Bert and Ernie are in Antarctica and come across a bossy penguin who insists Bert to be a papa penguin.
8. "Wild West" (October 30, 2008): Bert and Ernie are cowboys in the old west trying to convince a cow and bull to not leave so there can be milk in the town.
9. "Three Wishes" (November 3, 2008): Bert and Ernie are in an Arabian town. When Bert finds a dusty old lamp, he cleans it and a genie waitress comes out and grants people's wishes. Ernie wishes for a "Duckie Touch" where everything he touches turns into rubber duckies.
10. "Inventors" (November 5, 2008): Bert and Ernie are inventors building a robot named Frankie. However, the only problem about the robot is he can't stop while Bert and Ernie say stop.
11. "Museum Guards" (February 16, 2015): Bert and Ernie are museum guards. Ernie finds a painting of a lady with spaghetti who says, "Mamma mia, Angelo!" Ernie explains it to Bert and they climb into the painting and find out the lady has a son named Angelo who won't stop painting while the lady is trying to give his spaghetti lunch.
12. "Mountain Climbers": Bert and Ernie are mountain climbers as they encounter Heidi, the girl of the alps and her goat. But when her goat is hanging on a cliff, it's up to Bert and Ernie to save him.
13. "Deep Sea": Bert and Ernie are scuba divers and Ernie dives in the water in search of the Eight Legged Wonder. But Bert refuses to search with him. But when Rubber Duckie's safety is on the line, he decides to help Rubber Duckie and sees the Eight Legged Wonder and learns how fun new things can be.
14. "Pigeonia": Bert and Ernie are in Pigeonia in search of a lost pigeon temple that has "The Treasure of the Golden Pigeon".
15. "Ernlock Holmes": In a parody of Sherlock Holmes, with Ernie as Holmes and Bert as Watson, they have to solve the mystery of a girl's missing "duckling".
16. "Superheroes": Bert and Ernie are superheroes in "Superheropolis" who must stop the Mad Pancake from robbing everyone's oatmeal.
17. "Kung Fu": Bert and Ernie are guardians of the Royal Crysanthemum, the most beautiful and fragile flower in the kingdom, but when a monkey takes the crysanthemum, Bert and Ernie use their kung fu to get it back.
18. "Wizards": Bert, Ernie, and Elmo are in wizard school. But when Elmo accidentally turns their teacher Marlon into a frog, it's up to the trio to fly into the sky, pluck a feather from a two-headed fangriff to tickle Marlon before the hourglass runs out.
19. "Beach": Bert and Ernie are in a Californian beach with Bert's cousin, Bertina. But a hyper-competitive moose comes in and makes everything they do a contest.
20. "Invisible": Bert and Ernie are in a town where all the residents are invisible. Their job is to babysit an invisible family's baby daughter, Zippy, while the father goes out to order a pizza.
21. "Piano Movers": Bert and Ernie's job is to move a piano into an ostrich's upstairs room in her mansion.
22. "Cliptecs": Bert and Ernie take a tour to the land of the Cliptecs, a tribe who loves paperclips. When they meet them, they learn they're on a paperclip hunt, but found no paperclips. Bert uses a magnet to attract the paperclips. They think it's magic and Bert becomes their king.
23. "Knights": Bert and Ernie are knights who must rescue an imprisoned duck from a high tower guarded by a dragon.
24. "Secret Agents": Bert and Ernie are secret agents from Dr. Nose, a person who puts disguise masks on everyone in the town so they can look just like him.
25. "Rodeo": Bert and Ernie are clowns at a western show fair. But when a bull rider named "Macho Miguel" is absent, Ernie takes his place.
26. "Chariot": Bert and Ernie are in Ancient Rome as chariot racers and have to race Porkus Maximus when all they got is a donkey.

=== Season 2 (2009–11) ===
1. "Maltese Ducky" (November 10, 2009): Bert and Ernie are detectives trying to figure out a sheep's friend who seems to be a Maltese duck.
2. "Flower Shop" (November 12, 2009): Bert and Ernie work at an exotic flower shop while the owner is away, but when Ernie feeds a flower too much food, it's up to Bert and Ernie to get her back to size.
3. "Gopher Broke" (November 18, 2009): Bert and Ernie relax in a forest, but when a gopher digs and takes Rubber Duckie, it's up to Ernie to get it back.
4. "Dr. Bird Whistle" (November 20, 2009): Bert and Ernie are secret agents to stop Dr. Birdwhistle, a villain who traps birds to take them home to look at.
5. "Raiders of the Lost Duckies" (November 27, 2009): Bert and Ernie travel through the treacherous duck cave to find the Wise Old Duck who can answer every duck question.
6. "Raincloud" (December 11, 2009): Bert and Ernie are farmers, the only problem is they can't grow food because there's no rain. But when Ernie talks to a cloud, he helps the duo by giving rain to the plants.
7. "Car Mechanics" (December 28, 2009): Bert and Ernie are car mechanics. They have to fix a car that runs on singing. Bert and Ernie take it for a test drive, and Ernie takes it on a treacherous trail.
8. "Under the Sea" (January 1, 2010): Bert and Ernie are enjoying a day at the sea, Ernie then sees a mermaid and tells Bert, but he doesn't believe Ernie. A nasty rat comes and throws trash in the ocean, which causes the mermaid to be stuck. It's up to Bert and Ernie to save the mermaid.
9. "Lost Elephant" (February 18, 2010): Bert and Ernie are in East Africa in search of a herd of elephants, but they encounter a sad elephant who lost his mother. It's up to Bert and Ernie to find her.
10. "Three Ducketeers" (September 28, 2010): In a play of the Three Musketeers, Bert, Ernie, and Rubber Duckie are the Three Duck-Keteers. When King Louie Louie is giving an apology cake to Queen Marie Marie for eating her old cake, the Three Duck-Keteers help him.
11. "Loch Ness" (September 29, 2010): Bert and Ernie are in Loch Ness in Scotland in search of the Loch Ness Monster, they find her and find out that she's shy and doesn't want her picture taken.
12. "The Amazing Froggy" (September 30, 2010): Bert and Ernie are in an amusement park trying to train a frog to win the frog race.
13. "Walking Buttercup" (October 4, 2010): Bert and Ernie work as dog walkers and have to walk a sad dog named Buttercup, but difficulties ensue as she chases a squirrel.
14. "Bird Games" (October 12, 2010): Bert and Bernice compete at the bird games, but Bernice doesn't feel like she will win, so Bert and Ernie help her with the contests.
15. "Dustbusters" (November 1, 2010): In a parody of Ghostbusters, Bert and Ernie are Dustbusters, cleaning a lady's dusty house.
16. "Magicians" (November 5, 2010): Bert and Ernie are magicians, but when a rabbit takes Ernie's wand, it's up to Bert and Ernie to get it back.
17. "Platypus" (October 29, 2010): Bert and Ernie are in the Australian Outback in search of the platypus. They encounter a kangaroo with a joey. The joey loved Rubber Duckie that he took it from Ernie. It's up to Bert and Ernie to get Rubber Duckie back.
18. "Invent Wheel" (December 27, 2010): Bert and Ernie are cavemen moving their pet dinosaur Spot's dino house up a hill, but many obstacles come their way as rocks keep rolling down and a tickling dinosaur chases them.
19. "On the Island" (December 30, 2010): Bert and Ernie are in Hawaii relaxing, but they drift away with their inflatable raft, so they find another small island. It's up to Bert and Ernie to find a way to get help.
20. "Donnie Quixote" (July 15, 2017): In a play of Don Quixote, Bert and Ernie are squires to Donnie Quixote, but when he tells his donkey Fred to giddy up, he pushes Donnie off of him and loses his glasses. It's up to Bert and Ernie to retrieve his glasses.
21. "Butterfinger" (2011): Bert and Ernie are secret agents trying to stop Butterfinger, a butyraceous badguy who picks up things and drops them.
22. "Computer Bug" (2011): Bert and Ernie are repairmen trying to fix a computer bug, Bert can't get him out, so Ernie takes a picture of himself, and appears in the computer to stop the bug.
23. "Alien Spaceship" (2011): Bert and Ernie are camping at night when two Yip Yip aliens come and love Rubber Duckie so much, they call it their leader and take it to their UFO. It's up to Bert and Ernie to retrieve Rubber Duckie from the aliens.
24. "Puzzle Planet" (2011): Bert and Ernie land on a planet made out of quicksand called "Puzzle Planet". Soon, their ship begins to sink, so they find two individuals named Meno Nanu and Vanna Bing, and they play games to get a suction device that gets the ship out.
25. "Yeti" (2011): Bert and Ernie are climbing Mount Everest in search of the Purple Pigeon Posey, a flower that looks like pigeons and grow on the top of the mountain. Little do they know there is a yeti helping them.
26. "Bert the Pigeon" (2011): Bert and Ernie are in the park with Bernice, and then Ernie hypnotizes Bert to believe he is a pigeon. But Ernie soon regrets it when Bert is scared of a cat.

== Video releases ==
In the United States, the DVD Sesame Street: Count on Sports included the episodes "Tiny Town", "Inventors", and "Mountain Climbers", the DVD Pirates: Elmo and the Bookaneers included the episode "Pirates", and the DVD Sesame Street: 40 Years of Sunny Days included the episode "Penguin". On April 6, 2010, the series was released for the first time on DVD in the United States by Warner Home Video, with the episodes "Pirates", "Deep Sea", "Tiny Town", "Planet Bert", "Cavemen", "Mountain Climbers", "Penguins", "Ernlock Holmes", "Rainforest", "Bakers", "Wizards", "Three Wishes", and "Kung Fu".

In the United Kingdom and Australia, thirteen episodes were released on the DVD Bert & Ernie's Great Adventures: "Pirates", "Mountain Climbers", "Wizards With Elmo", "Penguin", "Three Wishes", "Wild West", "Rainforest", "Deep Sea", "Ernlock Holmes", "Cavemen", "Bakers", "Pigeonia", and "Cliptecs". The DVD was distributed in the United Kingdom by Abbey Home Media and in Australia by Madman Entertainment.
