= Sesame Street Together Book =

Book by Roger Bradfield

Sesame Street Together Book is an early Sesame Street Little Golden Book, in which the residents of Sesame Street come together to help each other out with an item another might need. It was published in 1971. It was also written by Revena Dwight and Roger Bradfield.

== Characters ==
Big Bird, Grover, Betty Lou, Roosevelt Franklin, Cookie Monster, Ernie, Bert, Herry Monster, Little Bird, Oscar the Grouch, Sherlock Hemlock, Farley, Baby Monster, Anything Muppets.
