= Elmo: The Musical =

- Genre: Children's television series; Musical
- Presented by: Kevin Clash; Ryan Dillon
- Opening theme: "Elmo the Musical Theme Song"
- Country of origin: United States
- Original language: English
- No. of seasons: 4
- No. of episodes: 18

Production
- Running time: 11 minutes
- Production company: Sesame Workshop

Original release
- Network: PBS; PBS Kids
- Release: September 24, 2012 – August 13, 2016

Elmo: The Musical is a musical Sesame Street segment that began airing in Season 43. It appeared in every episode until Season 46, where it alternated with Elmo's World.

In the segment, Elmo teaches math skills while imagining himself in different musical situations, such as "Sea Captain the Musical", "Mountain Climber the Musical", "Prince Elmo the Musical" and "President the Musical". Joining Elmo in his adventures is Velvet, a talking set of curtains, and a series of animal and Anything Muppet friends.

The segment's theme song was composed by Adam Schlesinger, while the legal registration ascribes lyrics to six of the Elmo: The Musical staff writers: Molly Boylan, Annie Evans, Belinda Ward, Joey Mazzarino, Luis Santeiro, and Christine Ferraro. The song was nominated for the 2013 Daytime Emmy Awards in the "Outstanding Original Song – Children's and Animation" category, along with "I'm the Queen of Nacho Picchu" from the Guacamole the Musical segment.

Interactive game versions of some of the segments appear on the Sesame Street website. Elements of the segment (including Velvet) appear in the Sesame Street Live show "Can't Stop Singing".

Starting in the fall of 2015, segments used in the hour edits of re-run episodes and new additions starting with season 46 now run around 7 minutes long.

This was the final Sesame Street production in which Kevin Clash provided the puppetry and voice of Elmo.

== Cast ==
- Kevin Clash as Elmo (seasons 43–44)
- Ryan Dillon as Elmo (season 45–46)
- Pam Arciero
- Jennifer Barnhart
- Fran Brill
- Tyler Bunch
- Leslie Carrara-Rudolph as Velvet and various others
- Stephanie D'Abruzzo
- Eric Jacobson
- John Kennedy
- Tim Lagasse
- Peter Linz
- Noel MacNeal
- Jim Martin
- Joey Mazzarino
- Paul McGinnis
- Carmen Osbahr
- Martin P. Robinson
- David Rudman
- Caroll Spinney
- John Tartaglia
- Matt Vogel
- Steve Whitmire

== Replacing Elmo's World ==
Production on the Elmo's World segments had ceased in the late 2000s, the last new segment airing as part of the 2009–10 season. The segment was meant to appeal to kids younger than the target age of the show (two years and younger). Executive producer Carol-Lynn Parente was not too pleased with the success it received, as it was targeting an age the show's curriculum was not designed for. The "block format" experiment of season 40 proved to be a ratings hit, attracting more children between the ages of 3–4, leaving the Elmo's World segment as the youngest-skewing portion of the program, something Parente wished to change even before production halted.

== Development ==
In June 2011, Joey Mazzarino and the other writers began developing new ideas for the new segment. One idea was to have Elmo go on road trips using his tricycle. Mazzarino stated Elmo's character was all about his excited view of the world and large imagination and they decided to go with an idea based on those characteristics. The idea of a musical segment came around and with the success of musical programs like High School Musical and Glee, the writers decided it was a good idea to move forward with.

== Episodes ==
=== Series overview ===
Season	Episodes	Originally released	
Season	Episodes	First released	Last released
1	10	September 24, 2012	February 14, 2013
2	3	September 16, 2013	January 16, 2014
3	2	September 17, 2014	October 6, 2014
4	3	March 26, 2016	August 13, 2016

=== Season 1 (2012-2013) ===
No. overall	No. in season	Title	Original release date
1	1	"Guacamole the Musical"	September 24, 2012
2	2	"Athlete the Musical"	September 25, 2012
3	3	"Sea Captain the Musical"	September 26, 2012
4	4	"Pizza the Musical"	September 28, 2012
5	5	"Airplane the Musical"	October 12, 2012
6	6	"Circus the Musical"	October 19, 2012
7	7	"President the Musical"	November 6, 2012
8	8	"Cowboy the Musical"	November 21, 2012
9	9	"Prince Elmo the Musical"	February 4, 2013
10	10	"Detective the Musical"	February 14, 2013

=== Season 2 (2013-2014) ===
No. overall	No. in season	Title	Original release date
11	1	"Bird the Musical"	September 16, 2013
12	2	"Repair Monster the Musical"	October 24, 2013
13	3	"Mountain Climber the Musical"	January 16, 2014

=== Season 3 (2014) ===
No. overall	No. in season	Title	Original release date
14	1	"Karate Master the Musical"	September 17, 2014
15	2	"Tomato the Musical"	October 6, 2014

=== Season 4 (2016) ===
No. overall	No. in season	Title	Original release date
16	1	"Superhero the Musical"	March 26, 2016
17	2	"Iguana the Musical"	July 16, 2016
18	3	"Beach the Musical"	August 13, 2016

== Production ==
Each episode took a day to film; the initial segments were filmed between January and February 2012. All the material was filmed in front of a bluescreen, with the performers dressed in blue to allow characters like Elmo to appear full-bodied. Magnetic Dreams Animation Studio, known for producing other animated segments for the show, provides the CGI elements of the segment, including the backgrounds and animated characters like Velvet. Each episode costs approximately $275,000 to produce.

== International ==
In late 2013, the segments began airing on ABC KIDS in Australia and well as in Germany on KI.KA as a separate mini-series. In 2014, the segments began airing in Dutch as part of the Sesamstraat mini-series, 10 voor.

== See also ==
- The Not-Too-Late Show with Elmo
- List of Sesame Street recurring segments

== Sources ==
- Stephanie D'Abruzzo's official website
- "Sesame Street Adds 'Elmo the Musical'". The New York Times. September 13, 2012.
- 'Sesame Street' Has Best Ratings Since 2007. Huffingtonpost.com. May 25, 2012
