= Word of the Day =

Word of the Day may refer to:

- "Word of the Day" (Rugrats), an episode of Rugrats
- The Wiktionary Word of the day

== See also ==
- Spanish Word of the Day, a Sesame Street recurring segment
- Word of the year, the most important word(s) or expression(s) in the public sphere during a specific year
