= Nour Almoujabber =

Lebanese filmmaker (born 1994)

- Born: Nour Jean Al Moujabber; 18 December 1994 (age 31); Sin El Fil, Lebanon
- Occupations: Film director; Screenwriter
- Years active: 2015–present
- Website: nouralmoujabber.com

Nour Almoujabber (Arabic: نور المجبّر, Arabic pronunciation: [ˈnəʊər ælmuːʤæbbɜː], born 18 December 1994) is a filmmaker, screenwriter, and novelist.

== Early life and education ==
Born in Lebanon, he studied at the Sainte Famille Wadi Chahrour school, then obtained a bachelor's degree in TV and Cinema, and a master's degree in Film Directing from the Lebanese University - Institute of Fine Arts.

== Early career ==
Nour Almoujabber's first short film The Stream (French: Le Ruisseau) (starring Christine Choueiri, Boutros Rouhana, Ralf Bou Chaya and Bissan Ahmad) toured the world to get Almoujabber his first awards.

In 2019, Almoujabber attended a masterclass led by Sesame Workshop in Jordan. He was chosen from 20 writers from the Arab World to co-write Ahlan Simsim (Arabic: أهلًا سمسم), the Arabic-language co-production of Sesame Street. The show will soon air its seventh season.

== Films and style ==
In 2019, Almoujabber’s masters’ short film What's Your Name (Arabic: شو اسمك) was the key to the audience’s recognition of the writer and director’s style.

Almoujabber focuses on writing scripts in a closed space, so the viewers focus on the dialogue and the mastery of acting. What's Your Name starred Randa Kaady and Nassib Sebaaly .

The film toured 34 countries including Russia, Italy, Azerbaijan, the United States, Jordan, Australia, Canada, Netherlands, France, Tunisia, Egypt, Yemen, Poland, Sweden, Canada and his hometown Lebanon.

Following his studies, Almoujabber worked on TV series as a writer, and short films as a script doctor, assistant director, and editor alongside his independent short films: On The Edge (Arabic: هون وتحت), starring Sany Abdul Baki and Joseph Akiki, and Another Conversation, starring Ramy Farah.

== Current work ==
Almoujabber joined 2Pure Studios in 2022, diving into the world of voice-over writing. After a while, he worked on two consecutive docu-drama TV series. The Goal (Arabic: الهدف), a biography of Saudi football legend Saeed Al Owairan, which aired on Shahid, while the second project, currently entitled Ghayeb [En: Disappeared] is in the pre-production phase.

The success of his short film What's Your Name inspired Almoujabber to develop it into a feature film with the same title. He attended Rawi Residency in 2022 with Royal Film Committee in Jordan.

Nour Almoujabber is currently working on his first novel, The Excuses I Give Her.

== Filmography ==
=== Short films ===
Year	English title	Director	Writer	Editor	Original title
2015	The Stream	Yes	Yes	Yes	Le Ruisseau
2019	What's Your Name	Yes	Yes	Yes	ش و ا س م ك
2021	On The Edge	Yes	Yes	Yes	هون وتحت
2022	Another Conversation	Yes	Yes	Yes	Another Conversation

=== TV Series ===
Year	English title	Director	Writer	Note
2022	The Goal	No	Yes	Airing on Shahid
2023	Ghayeb	No	Yes	In preproduction

=== Feature films ===
Year	English title	Director	Writer	Note
N/A	What's Your Name	Yes	Yes	In development
