= List of Donkey Hodie episodes =

2021 American children's television series

Donkey Hodie is an American puppet live action musical preschool television series created by David and Adam Rudman for PBS Kids, and is aimed at preschoolers ages 3 to 5. Inspired by characters created by Fred Rogers, the series premiered on May 3, 2021 and is the second spinoff of Rogers' television series Mister Rogers' Neighborhood after Daniel Tiger's Neighborhood. The first full episode was initially set to premiere in winter 2021, on PBS Kids in the United States, but it was pushed back to May 3, 2021.

On April 7, 2022, it was announced that Donkey Hodie was renewed for a second season, which was slated to premiere in spring 2023, but was delayed to August 14, 2023.

This series was renewed for a third season, that premiered on August 11, 2025.

== Series overview ==
Season	Segments	Episodes	Originally released	
Season	Segments	Episodes	First released	Last released
1	79	40	May 3, 2021	February 23, 2023
2	48	25	August 14, 2023	April 17, 2025
3	28	15	August 11, 2025	TBA

== Episodes ==
=== Season 1 (2021–23) ===
No. overall	No. in season	Title	Directed by	Written by	Original release date	Prod. code
1	1	"Flying Flapjacks" "Pickle Penguin Problem"	David Rudman	Joey Mazzarino	May 3, 2021	102
Donkey wants to make Flying Flapjacks all by herself, but she makes a lot of mistakes. She then realizes that she hasn't been doing it by herself and that everybody needs help sometimes. Panda loses his new Pickle Penguin in some rocks, and Donkey tries to help him get it out. They both learn that laughter can make hard things easier.
2	2	"A Big Favor for Grampy" "A Fair Way to Bounce"	David Rudman	Adam & David Rudman Joey Mazzarino	May 3, 2021	101
Donkey has to take her Grampy's pet elephant, Gregory for a walk while Grampy heads to juggling team practice. But this proves to be super strenuous because Gregory is reluctant to move. Donkey is upset, so Clyde the Cloud shows up and teaches Donkey that she can breathe to chill out when she feels upset. Harriett has made a new invention called the Bounce-a-rino. But the gang can't decide who goes first, and come up with unfair ways to decide. They all then learn that there is always a fair way to decide about something and have fun on the Bounce-a-rino.
3	3	"Super Duper Sleepover" "Mountain Climb Time"	David Rudman	Adam & David Rudman	May 4, 2021	103
Donkey and Panda are having a super duper sleepover, but they find a monster in the dark and they can't go to sleep. When they find out that it is just Panda's toys, they realize there is always an explanation for things that might seem scary. Donkey and Panda want to climb up Mt. Really High Up, but while Panda wants to stop, Donkey wants to reach the top. Even though they didn't reach the top, Grampy teaches them that practice makes perfect.
4	4	"The Waiting Game" "Planet Purple Party"	David Rudman	Adam & David Rudman	May 5, 2021	104
Donkey wants to open a big present from Harriett, but she has to wait for her friends to get there. The gang and Donkey learn that when they wait, they can use their imagination to pass the time. It's Mama Panda's birthday today on Planet Purple, so Panda plans to throw her a surprise party and he keeps forgetting things. He learns that there are ways to keep track of things and Mama Panda has a great birthday party.
5	5	"The Masked Veggies" "The Royal Hosts"	David Rudman	Joey Mazzarino Liz Hara	May 6, 2021	105
Panda is on Game Show Gator's newest show, The Masked Veggies, and Panda is nervous. In the final round, he learns that his friends are always there, even when he can't see them. Donkey and Panda have to act as Royal Hosts for King Friday's visit from the Neighborhood of Make-Believe, but they don't know what kings like to do, because they think King Friday won't like their silly game. They learn that they should always try ideas, even when you're worried about them.
6	6	"Chili Jamboree" "Hoof Dancing is Hard"	David Rudman	Joey Mazzarino	May 10, 2021	106
Bob Dog (really) can't wait for Grampy's slow cooked chili. He and his pals sing to help pass the time, but it doesn't help. Bob Dog learns that he can do something he loves to help him wait. Donkey wants to learn how to hoof dance, but she just can't get it. She learns from Grampy that in order to be a good hoof dancer, she needs to practice.
7	7	"The Yodel Birds Are Coming" "A Lot of Hot"	David Rudman	Adam & David Rudman	May 11, 2021	107
The yodel birds are coming to Someplace Else, and they could use a place to rest up. The gang builds a rest nest, and while Panda and Duck Duck builds the nest, Donkey and Bob Dog have trouble building the structure. Someplace Else is having a heatwave. But in order to cool everyone down, Donkey and Duck Duck set up a lemonade stand.
8	8	"Growing the Ungrowdenia" "Camp Buddy Buddy"	David Rudman	Stephanie D'Abruzzo Joey Mazzarino	May 12, 2021	108
Donkey is growing an Ungrowdenia in her yard. When it gets big, she wants it to get even bigger. Donkey and Panda are visiting Camp Buddy Buddy on a windy day. However, when their plans keep literally blowing away, they know to change the plan so that way they can have a great time at Camp Buddy Buddy too.
9	9	"Art Show Today" "The Lavender Lights"	David Rudman	Adam & David Rudman	May 13, 2021	109
Donkey is creating a sculpture for the Someplace Else art show. When she keeps making mistakes, she feels ready to give up. Panda wants to bring his pals to see the Lavender Lights in outer space, but Duck Duck is afraid of taking off in spaceships.
10	10	"Spooky Shadow Swamp" "Hidden Orchestra"	David Rudman	Joey Mazzarino	May 17, 2021	110
When Donkey and Panda lose Bob Dog's favorite ball in the most "spooky-ookiest" place in Someplace Else, the Spooky Shadow Swamp, they must find their inner braveness to get that ball back. They join the Hidden Orchestra, Donkey must complete a scavenger hunt for hidden instruments.
11	11	"SQUIBBIT" "Teamwork Challenge"	David Rudman	Allan Neuwirth Adam Rudman & Joey Mazzarino	May 18, 2021	111
A noisy penguin interrupts Donkey and Panda's band practice. They must figure out what the penguin wants so it stops squibbiting. The pals team up for Gator's latest gameshow, but can't agree on answers to his clues.
12	12	"The Fastest Fetcher" "Bobbly Ball"	David Rudman	Belinda Ward & Stephanie D'Abruzzo Adam Rudman	May 19, 2021	112
Bob Dog quits fetching when he loses the Fastest Fetcher game show. Donkey now must find Bob Dog a new enjoyable hobby that will make him feel "Bow-Wowy" again. Donkey and Panda get bored practicing Bobbly Ball. They find ways to make practice fun so they can catch the ball and win a surprise.
13	13	"The Royal Sandcastle Builders" "Bobski Bounce"	David Rudman	Joey Mazzarino Louie Lazar & Adam Rudman	May 24, 2021	113
Donkey and Panda want to help King Friday build a sandcastle, but when it keeps falling, they get frustrated. Donkey is ready to complete the Bobski Bounce Challenge, and Bob Dog helps out with some advice.
14	14	"The Cow and Potato Bug Opera" "Everything Explorers"	David Rudman	Joey Mazzarino & Liz Hara Adam Rudman	August 9, 2021	114
Donkey is excited to direct a new show starring all her pals. But when she needs to become an actor in the show, she should let Panda be the new leader. Donkey and Panda discover a surprise spider, but every time they get close to it, it jumps away.
15	15	"The Golden Crunchdoodles" "Walking Stick Blues"	David Rudman	Liz Hara Adam Rudman & George Arthur Bloom	August 10, 2021	115
Donkey and Panda discover a golden rainbow outside after a storm. Hopefully, if they follow it, it would lead them to a mythical bowl of Golden Crunchdoodles cereal. When Grampy's walking stick breaks, Donkey vows to help fix it and maybe her pals' ideas can help.
16	16	"Good Dog School" "Panda Hodie"	David Rudman	Stephanie D'Abruzzo	August 11, 2021	116
Bob Dog is nervous about his Good Dog School graduation. His pals remind him of what he's good at, but he must find the confidence to graduate. Panda loses his Super Porcupine puppet. If Donkey pretends she is Panda, she can find it for him.
17	17	"Bye Bye, Book" "Tater Buddies"	David Rudman	Belinda Ward Joey Mazzarino	August 12, 2021	117
Duck Duck builds a book swap box so all her pals can share books, but it's harder to give away her books than she thought. The pals throw a party for their Tater Buddy dolls. When one of his friends is upset, Panda must spot the signs and help.
18	18	"Donkey's Bad Day" "Yodel Bird Egg"	David Rudman	Liz Hara Belinda Ward	August 13, 2021	118
Donkey and Panda's Awesome, Extra Fun, Very Good Day keeps going badly. Donkey must find a way to cheer herself up. Donkey and Panda find a yodel bird egg with no mama in sight. They vow to protect it, but it's harder than they expect.
19	19	"Mooing Moon Moths" "Stop and Think"	David Rudman	Joey Mazzarino George Arthur Bloom	November 22, 2021	119
Donkey is excited to see the Mooing Moon Moths of Moo Moth Moon. However, she accidentally hee-haws them away. Now, She and Panda must find them all. The problem is that retrieving the Moths isn't an easy feat. Bob Dog is looking for his boogie bone, but he can't find it. The thing he needs to do to help find it is to stop and think.
20	20	"Best Friends Day" "Silly Sticky Situation"	David Rudman	Liz Hara Belinda Ward	November 23, 2021	120
It's Best Friends Day, but Donkey and Panda want to do two different things, but both of them don't wanna do the others. Soon, Best Friends Day becomes Best Friends Apart Day, Fortunately, it's about to go back to Best Friends Day again, because Donkey and Panda get an idea. During art time, Donkey accidentally gets herself stuck to a giant glue bottle. But when Duck Duck, Bob Dog, and Panda also get stuck, the gang gets in a truly sticky situation.
21	21	"The Try Scouts" "Wiz-Kazizz-Kazaam"	David Rudman Frankie Cordero	Joey Mazzarino	November 24, 2021	121
Donkey and Panda become Try Scouts and must complete hard challenges to earn badges. Donkey and Duck Duck teach Bob Dog how to play a new game. When his different emotions disrupt the game, it's hard for his pals to play.
22	22	"Potato Pirates" "Panda's Special Something"	David Rudman	Joey Mazzarino Christine Ferraro	November 25, 2021	122
To find the Ruby Red Tater Treasure, Captain Donkey realizes she needs to stop and listen to her pirate crew. Panda discovers his favorite hoodie from when he was little, but it's too small and can't fit for him now. He must find a special way to say goodbye to it.
23	23	"A Night Out" "Poetry Problem"	David Rudman	George Arthur Bloom & Louie Lazar Stephanie D'Aburuzzo	March 4, 2022	123
The pals are excited to sleep under the stars, but it's Donkey's first time. Panda and Duck Duck must help her feel less afraid. Panda forgot his poetry notebook at Donkey's messy windmill. Donkey must find it inside her messy windmill before his poetry recital.
24	24	"Groovy Guitar" "Treasure Nest"	David Rudman	Louie Lazar Adam Rudman	March 11, 2022	124
Donkey's guitar goes missing right before the talent show. Panda and Duck Duck help her look all around for it. Duck Duck finally finds her family's Treasure Nest, but she can't open it. Maybe she needs to look at the problem in a new way.
25	25	"Swoop-a-Rino" "Duck Duck's Great Adventure"	David Rudman	Christine Ferraro Joey Mazzarino	March 18, 2022	125
Donkey and Bob Dog love riding Harriett's new Swoop-a-rino, but Duck Duck can't figure out how to fly it. Donkey takes Duck Duck on her very own adventure where she has to make a lot of choices.
26	26	"Being Bob Dog" "Panda Panda"	David Rudman	Stephanie D'Abruzzo	March 25, 2022	126
Donkey and Panda don't know what to give Bob Dog for his birthday, so they pretend to be him to figure out the bow-wowiest present ever. Donkey and Panda's playdate goes haywire when they find one of Harriett's inventions.
27	27	"Piano Problem" "Bongo-Lympics"	David Rudman	Adam Rudman	June 6, 2022	127
Donkey and Purple Panda have to get a piano to Grampy's Sing-Along. Purple Panda practices to compete in the Bongo-lympics with the help of Donkey.
28	28	"Cheesy Con" "Stanley's One-Dragon Show"	David Rudman Frankie Cordero	Joey Mazzarino	June 7, 2022	128
Donkey and Purple Panda look forward to Cheesy Con, but Donkey hurts her ankle after she slips and has to stay home. Thankfully, Panda knows that he can bring the feeling of Cheesy Con to her home. Donkey has to help Stanley the dragon improve his one dragon show before it starts.
29	29	"Acornball" "Super Duper Magic Fun Box"	David Rudman	Adam Rudman Joey Mazzarino	June 8, 2022	130
Donkey and Panda want to play Game Show Gator's latest game, but it's not ready yet so they invent their own game. Panda and Donkey get a package from Purple Planet.
30	30	"The Potato Stand" "Clyde's Surprise Playdate"	David Rudman	Adam Rudman	June 9, 2022	129
Donkey opens up her own potato stand, but has trouble getting customers to come to her stand. When Donkey hears that Clyde the Cloud has never had a playdate, she decides to give Clyde his very first playdate.
31	31	"A Donkey Hodie Halloween"	David Rudman	Joey Mazzarino	October 10, 2022	131
Donkey Hodie helps Panda warm up Halloween by helping him overcome his fear of Halloweeny things. Note: This is the first half-hour episode.
32	32	"Snow Day" "Snow Surprise Challenge"	David Rudman Frankie Cordeo	Joey Mazzarino	December 5, 2022	132
Panda enjoys a snow day his own way. Bob Dog wants to win at Gameshow Gator's new snowy game.
33	33	"Yodel Bird Sitting" "Superhero Squabble"	David Rudman	Belinda Ward	December 6, 2022	133
Donkey babysits a baby yodel bird who won't take a nap. Donkey and Panda argue while playing superheroes.
34	34	"Hey-o, Purple Moon" "Purple Peg Problem"	David Rudman	Stephanie D'Abruzzo	December 7, 2022	134
Panda hopes to find a quiet way to show his love for the moon moths. Donkey helps Panda fix his spaceship.
35	35	"Dodie Hodie" "Uniquely Panda"	David Rudman	Liz Hara Christine Ferraro	December 8, 2022	135
Donkey wonders if she and her cousin can have fun together since they don't like doing the same things anymore. Panda thinks about how he is different from other pandas.
36	36	"Big Nest Bird Party" "Pet Elephant Camp"	David Rudman Frank Cordero	Adam Rudman George Arthur Bloom	December 9, 2022	136
Donkey tries to act like a bird at Duck Duck's bird party, but she does not enjoy herself. Grampy and Donkey miss Gregory while he is away at camp.
37	37	"Gator's New Game" "Donkey and Panda Cheer Up"	David Rudman	Joey Mazzarino	February 20, 2023	137
The pals help Gameshow Gator make up a new game that everyone can play. Donkey and Panda remind each other that they can cheer themselves up when they're down.
38	38	"Me, Myself, and Donkey" "Fashion Donkey"	David Rudman	Adam Rudman Joey Mazzarino	February 21, 2023	138
Donkey is disappointed when her friends are away for the day, but finds a way to have fun on her own. Donkey wants to be like Fashion Penguin.
39	39	"Bright Bright Bugs" "Panda's Purple Break"	David Rudman Frankie Cordero	Liz Hara Adam Rudman	February 22, 2023	139
Donkey and Panda camp out to see the Bright Bright Bugs. Panda feels tired of his purple things, so Donkey helps him take a break.
40	40	"The Golden Crunchdoodles Return" "Flowers, Fetch, and Dance"	David Rudman	Adam Rudman	February 23, 2023	140
The pals find a box of Golden Crunchdoodles cereal. Panda and Bob Dog want to play different things.

=== Season 2 (2023–25) ===
No. overall	No. in season	Title	Directed by	Written by	Original release date	Prod. code
41	1	"Trolley Visits Someplace Else" "Wish Upon a Fish"	David Rudman	Adam Rudman Melvin Campbell	August 14, 2023	204
Trolley visits Someplace Else for a big party. Donkey thinks her pet fish is magic and will help her complete her tough stuff-to-do list.
42	2	"The Breakfast Bowl" "Dancing Dandelions"	David Rudman	Joey Mazzarino	August 15, 2023	201
Donkey and Panda compete against each other in the Breakfast Bowl. Donkey, Panda, and Bob Dog plant Dancing Dandelion seeds and help each other find the right music to grow the flowers.
43	3	"Speedy Delivery" "Ruff Night"	David Rudman	Belinda Ward Liz Hara	August 16, 2023	202
Turtle-Lou opens a Speedy Delivery service. The pals have a sleepover at Bob Dog's house.
44	4	"Feelings Detectives" "Clyde's Cloudy Day"	David Rudman	Joey Mazzarino Alan Neuwirth	August 17, 2023	203
Duck Duck has a super big feeling, but she doesn't know what it is. Detectives Donkey and Panda are on the case. When Clyde the Cloud feels bummed out, the pals want to help him feel better, but he needs time. They give him time until he is ready to play.
45	5	"A Donkey Dilemma" "The Quiet Game"	Frankie Cordero David Rudman	Adam Rudman	August 18, 2023	205
Donkey promised to help Grampy bathe Gregory and play Bubble Bonanza with Panda today. The pals play too loudly while Rock Star Penguin tries to write a song. They make up a quiet game to help to find out who can stay quiet the longest.
46	6	"Pet Rock Problem" "Donkey Wonky Tea Party"	Frankie Cordero David Rudman	Adam Rudman Joey Mazzarino	February 26, 2024	206
Cousin Hodie's pet rock has gone missing. Donkey hosts a special party but forgets her pals' favorite teas and treats.
47	7	"The Goalies" "Mousy Hodie"	Frankie Cordero David Rudman	Adam Rudman Melvin Campbell	February 27, 2024	207
Donkey and Panda set goals to achieve for the day. Donkey shows Mousy how to play "the Donkey way."
48	8	"The Tree Swing" "Book Club"	David Rudman Frankie Cordero	Adam Rudman	February 28, 2024	208
Cousin Hodie wants to play with Donkey on a tree swing, but he has a hard time. Duck Duck's new club book is too huge for her and Donkey to read.
49	9	"Someplace Cold" "Purple Polka Dot Party"	David Rudman	Joey Mazzarino Belinda Ward	February 29, 2024	209
Donkey and Panda go to Someplace Cold to keep Snurdley from melting. Panda wants to have a party with his friends in Planet Purple.
50	10	"How Does It Feel?" "Best Ball Fest"	Frankie Cordero David Rudman	Adam Rudman	March 1, 2024	210
Bob Dog talks about other's feelings. Bob Dog wants to go to the Best Ball Fest, but he needs to find out which ball is best.
51	11	"Bob Dog's Balloon Bother" "We Miss Panda"	David Rudman	Ayub Arain Adam Rudman	June 10, 2024	211
Bob Dog faces a big fear. The pals miss Panda while he's away.
52	12	"Just Him and Me" "Duck Duck's Concert"	David Rudman	Stephanie D'Aburzzo Louie Lazar	June 11, 2024	212
Donkey feels disappointed when Grampy gives Panda a piano lesson. Duck Duck feels disappointed when she misses her favorite band, but Donkey, Panda, and Bob decide to cheer her up.
53	13	"Thankful Donkey" "The Penguin Diner-Rama"	Frankie Cordero	Melissa Oskouie Adam Rudman	June 12, 2024	213
Donkey makes Grampy a special card but when she is delivering it to him, she gets stuck in sticky situations. The pals help Harriet with her new invention for penguins.
54	14	"Cousin Hodie's Rainy Day" "Grampy's Guppies"	David Rudman	Joey Mazzarino Melvin Campbell	June 13, 2024	214
Donkey and Cousin figure out how to have fun in the rain. Donkey is patient while Cousin learns a new game at Grampy's Game Day.
55	15	"A Wonderful Thunderful Day" "Hoopy Hoopers"	David Rudman	Allan Neuwirth Belinda Ward	June 14, 2024	215
The pals each feel differently about a loud thunderstorm. Mama Panda teaches Donkey and Panda new hoopy hoop tricks.
56	16	"The Wind Racer" "Play This Way"	David Rudman	Liz Hara Andrew Moriarty & Maxwell Nicoll	September 16, 2024	216
Donkey accidentally breaks Grampy's favorite toy. Donkey and Panda play with a Tater Buddy.
57	17	"What a Pickle" "Scooter Blues"	David Rudman	Adam Rudman	September 17, 2024	217
Duck Duck's magic trick goes awry, turning her neighbors' things into pickles. Donkey is afraid to scooter after a fall.
58	18	"Gameshow Gaffe" "Balancing Team Troubles"	Frankie Cordero	Jill Cozza-Turner Louie Lazar	September 18, 2024	218
Donkey hosts Gator's game show for a day. Donkey joins the Balance Ball team but feels uncomfortable doing something new.
59	19	"Bob Dog's Stuffie Situation" "A Swampy Playdate"	Frankie Cordero David Rudman	Adam Rudman Joey Mazzarino	September 19, 2024	219
Bob Dog brings a ball to the Stuffie Playdate. Frankie Fox invites Donkey to her swamp, but she feels nervous about playing in it.
60	20	"Plain Old Day" "Birdie Beach Concert"	David Rudman	Stephanie D'Abruzzo Melvin Campbell	September 20, 2024	220
Panda is sad when an exciting holiday is over. Rockstar Penguin asks Donkey and Panda to make up a new dance.
61	21	"A Donkey Hodie New Year"	David Rudman	Adam Rudman	December 2, 2024	223
Donkey and her gang are celebrating New Year's Eve. Note: This is the second half-hour episode.
62	22	"Hee-Hee Hider Seekers" "The Great Wait"	David Rudman Frankie Cordero	Jill Cozza-Turner	April 14, 2025	222
Jeffrey Mouse, Donkey and Panda find a moth. Donkey makes up a song while waiting for Turtle-Lou to deliver her guitar.
63	23	"Meemaw Heehaw's Recipe Mystery" "Extra-Large Crunchdoodles"	David Rudman Frankie Cordero	Joey Mazzarino Adam Rudman	April 15, 2025	221
Donkey and Grampy try to make a family recipe. Donkey and Panda are excited to try a new cereal.
64	24	"Quick Quack Pack" "Find a Way to Fix It"	David Rudman Frankie Cordero	Belinda Ward Liz Hara	April 16, 2025	225
Duck Duck wants to fly with the bigger birds. Donkey loses Bob Dog's favorite toy.
65	25	"A Donkey Hodie Road Trip"	David Rudman	Belinda Ward	April 17, 2025	224
Donkey, Cousin, and Panda go on a road trip. Note: This is the third half-hour episode.

=== Season 3 (2025–) ===
No. overall	No. in season	Title	Directed by	Written by	Original release date	Prod. code
66	1	"Rock and Roll Feelings Detectives" "Speedy Delivery Helpers"	David Rudman	Joey Mazzarino Belinda Ward	August 11, 2025	301
Donkey and Panda try to save Rockstar Penguin's show. The pals help Turtle-Lou deliver packages.
67	2	"The Goofies" "Field Day"	David Rudman	Adam Rudman Liz Hara	August 12, 2025	302
Donkey and Panda search for hidden treasure. Cousin Hodie joins a day of games in Someplace Else.
68	3	"Daniel Tiger Visits Someplace Else"	David Rudman	Jill Cozza-Turner	August 13, 2025	303
Daniel Tiger and Mr. Tiger visit Someplace Else to help Grampy Hodie, and Donkey Hodie goes on an adventure with Daniel. Note: This is the fourth half-hour episode and a crossover with Daniel Tiger's Neighborhood.
69	4	"Art Class Adventure" "Danda Ponkey Kindness Day"	Frankie Cordero	Stephanie D'Abruzzo Samantha Berger	August 14, 2025	304
Harriet encourages Donkey to use clay in art class. Donkey and Panda do kind things all day.
70	5	"Duck Duck's Broken Bookcase" "Greeble the Treeble"	Hailey Jenkins David Rudman	Joey Mazzarino Adam Rudman	March 9, 2026	305
Duck Duck learns to fix her broken bookcase. Donkey welcomes Greeble the Treeble to Someplace Else.
71	6	"Purple Putt-Putt" "Bob Dog's Style"	David Rudman	Belinda Ward Melvin Campbell	March 10, 2026	306
Bob Dog has trouble learning Putt-Putt by the rules. The pals try outfits from Harriet's invention.
72	7	"Beach Day" "Super Super Duper Sleepover"	Matt Vogel	Zayna Quadar Allan Neuwirth	March 11, 2026	307
Duck Duck enjoys "me time" at the beach. The pals like different things at Donkey's sleepover.
73	8	"Donkey's Eye Exam" "The Music Marathon"	Haley Jenkins David Rudman	Samantha Berger Adam Rudman	August 17, 2026	309
74	9	"Camera Club" "Special Memory Day"	Haley Jenkins Frankie Cordero	Stephanie D'Abruzzo Sheryl McGloffin-Pinto	August 18, 2026	312
75	10	"Happy Hodie Froyo Stand" "Pie Oh My"	Haley Jenkins David Rudman	Jill Cozza-Turner Stephanie D'Abruzzo	August 19, 2026	308
76	11	"The Rainbow Potato Vote" "Hopping Honeyberries"	TBA	TBA	November 2, 2026	314
77	12	"Party Planning Problem" "Purple Panda's Opera"	TBA	TBA	November 3, 2026	310
78	13	"Purple Doodle-Doo" "Gameshow Gator's Turn"	TBA	TBA	November 4, 2026	311
79	14	"Cousin Hodie's New Pet" "Wacky Weather Pattern"	TBA	TBA	November 5, 2026	313
