= Kermit's Swamp Years =

2002 The Muppets film

- DVD cover
- Based on: The Muppet Show by Jim Henson
- Screenplay by: Jim Lewis; Joey Mazzarino
- Story by: Jim Lewis
- Directed by: David Gumpel
- Starring: Steve Whitmire; Bill Barretta; Joey Mazzarino; John Kennedy
- Narrated by: Steve Whitmire
- Music by: Joe Carroll; Peter Thom
- Country of origin: United States
- Original language: English

Production
- Producer: Ritamarie Peruggi
- Cinematography: Stephen Campbell; Rufus Standefer
- Editor: Katina Zinner
- Running time: 83 minutes
- Production companies: Columbia TriStar Home Entertainment; Jim Henson Home Entertainment

Original release
- Network: Starz
- Release: August 18, 2002

Kermit's Swamp Years is a 2002 American direct-to-video buddy road comedy adventure film directed by David Gumpel and featuring The Muppets. The plot recounts the early life of Kermit the Frog, offering a prequel to the 1979 film The Muppet Movie.

Young Kermit ventures beyond his swamp home for the first time, alongside friends Goggles and Croaker, all sharing an adventure.

Kermit's Swamp Years was first broadcast on August 18, 2002 on the Starz network, with VHS and DVD releases the following month.

Although produced at Disney-MGM Studios, film rights are held by Sony Pictures rather than The Walt Disney Company.

== Plot ==
Kermit the Frog rides a scooter down a dirt road on his way to visit the swamp where he grew up and reminisces about his first big adventure.

A 12-year-old Kermit enjoys a serene amphibian's life with his two best friends, Croaker, a cool and smooth-talking frog, who is the best hopper in the swamp, and Goggles, a shy and awkward toad. Kermit wonders what lies beyond the swamp, but his companions do not think the same. The friends run into a science teacher named Dr. Hugo Krassman (John Hostetter) and his assistant Mary (Kelly Collins Lintz), who intend to capture frogs. Arnie the Alligator saves them and warns them about the dangers lurking outside the swamp, especially regarding humans. The next day, they run into Blotch, a huge bullfrog, who bullies Goggles. The fight spills onto a road, where the pair are taken by a pet store owner named Wilson (William Bookston), prompting Kermit and Croaker to venture forth on a quest to save their friends.

When Goggles and Blotch are taken into a pet store, Blotch's bullying causes the pair to be put in a cage with a snake named Vicki, who intends to eat Blotch. Goggles saves him by goading Vicki to kill him and then using his poison gland. The other animals at the store manage to convince Goggles and Blotch that being sold to someone as a pet leads to a safe and luxurious lifestyle.

After getting run over by Wilson's truck and having tire tracks on his chest, Croaker is no longer able to hop and starts to lose his confidence. Kermit and Croaker meet a stray dog named Pilgrim (voiced by Cree Summer), who saves them from Krassman and Mary, then decides to help them find their friends. Kermit is able to find Wilson's truck by using helium balloons, but discovers they are no longer in the vehicle. Kermit regroups with Pilgrim and Croaker again, and together they find Wilson's Pet Store. Croaker, filled with motivation, finally manages to hop again by hopping through the window and helps Kermit through the window, but they find out from Vicki that their friends have gone to George Washington High School, where animals never come back from. Kermit speaks to a star he often looked up at in the swamp, who gives him advice that he should not give up hope.

The next day, Kermit and Croaker deliberately get caught by Wilson to get taken to the high school and escape upon arrival as the first step of Kermit's plan. They meet Pilgrim again, who followed them in order to save Goggles and Blotch as well. Pilgrim and Croaker are captured by Wilson, while Kermit hitches a ride to the classroom on a student's backpack. Krassman intends to dissect Goggles, but Blotch goes in his place to return the favor for rescuing him from Vicki. Krassman decides to dissect Croaker instead, when Wilson brings him into the class. Mary refuses to show the class how the dissection is done and leaves the classroom. Kermit manages to free Croaker from the dissection table and fight Krassman using some swashbuckling techniques he picked up earlier in a cinema.

Despite the warnings that Kermit should never talk to humans, Kermit stops Krassman from attacking Goggles by talking and asks him to please release the frogs. This action leads Krassman to reveal that as a child, he was about to dissect a frog who begged him to stop, but refused to say anything to everyone else in Krassman's classroom, which caused him to be humiliated. With the truth revealed that frogs can talk and Kermit's rescue plan as a success, Krassman frees all the frogs, dismisses the class and enables Kermit and his friends to return home. After a ride back to the swamp's border in Wilson's truck, Wilson adopts Pilgrim and the four friends head back home, where Kermit is hailed a hero.

Back in the present, Kermit thinks about how all of them have remained friends over the years before finally arriving at the border and reunites with his friends and family.

== Cast ==
- John Hostetter – Dr. Hugo Krassman
- Kelly Collins Lintz – Mary
- William Bookston – Wilson
- Cree Summer – Pilgrim, Kermit's Mom, Star (voices)
- Christian Kebbel – Young Jim Henson

=== Muppet performers ===
- Steve Whitmire – Kermit the Frog, Jack Rabbit, Chico
- Bill Barretta – Croaker the Frog, Horace D'Fly, Roy, Turtle #2, Dog
- Joey Mazzarino – Goggles the Toad, Turtle #1, Rodent, Joe the Armadillo (DVD extras only)
- John Kennedy – Blotch the Bullfrog, Arnie the Alligator, Monkey
- Alice Dinnean – Vicki, Pilgrim (puppeteer), Kermit's Mom (puppeteer), Ferret, Mouse
- Jerry Nelson – Young Statler
- Dave Goelz – Young Waldorf
- Mark Gale – Frog, Raccoon

== Production notes ==
Goggles and Croaker were performed by Joey Mazzarino and Bill Barretta, respectively. Mazzarino was a writer, lyricist, and puppeteer for Sesame Street at the time of the film's production. Mazzarino also co-wrote the teleplay for the film. Blotch was performed by John Kennedy.

Originally, Barretta was going to play Goggles and Mazzarino was going to play Croaker, but they traded roles after they tried out the characters.

The opening and closing sequence also introduces Horace D'Fly (voiced by Barretta), one of the few computer-animated Muppets (In the outtakes reel at the end of the film, Horace complains about having to be inside Kermit's mouth and asks, "Can't we use CG or something?").

The character Pilgrim was depicted in some scenes using a real dog, and other scenes as a puppet that was identical to the live dog.

The film's outtakes reel includes an alternate version of the song "The Rainbow Connection" performed by Me First and the Gimme Gimmes.

Joe the Armadillo (performed by Mazzarino) hosts the DVD behind-the-scenes featurette, interviewing various members of the production staff and crew.
