= Murray Monster =

- Sesame Street character
- First appearance: Episode 4135
- Portrayed by: Joey Mazzarino

In-universe information
- Species: Sesame Street Muppet Monster
- Gender: Male
- Nationality: American
- Fur/skin color: Red-orange

Murray Monster is a character on Sesame Street. He is performed by Joey Mazzarino.

== History ==
Murray is an energetic monster. Although unnamed, the character was referred to on the set as "FilFil," as his design is based on that of Filfil from Alam Simsim. Beginning in Season 38 of Sesame Street, he gained an identity as Murray, hosting the "What's the Word on the Street?" segments that precede each episode, where he asks people what each Word of the Day means. In Season 39, he began appearing in his own segment, "Murray Has a Little Lamb", where he goes to a certain school with his pet purple lamb Ovejita. In Season 40, Murray started serving as a host of the new "block format", presenting the letter and number of the day, introducing upcoming segments within the episodes, and announcing the sponsors. Murray was given a new segment in Season 42 called "Murray's Science Experiments", which are spread through the tune-ins.

On the character, Joey Mazzarino stated: "I kinda keep Murray like, who's the guy on Fraggle Rock? Uncle Traveling Matt. Because I feel like he goes out into the real world, and when we put him onto the street, there's just a million characters who can service this."

Since Mazzarino's resignation from Sesame Street, Murray has ceased being a regular character on the show, starting with season 46, but has occasionally been seen in re-used material. Murray also appears as a background character on Ahlan Simsim.
