= Donkey Hodie (TV series) =

American live-action puppet children's television series from PBS Kids

- Genre: Children's television series; Musical; Comedy; Preschool; Educational
- Created by: David Rudman; Adam Rudman
- Based on: Characters by Fred Rogers
- Developed by: Ellen Doherty
- Starring: Haley Jenkins; Stephanie D'Abruzzo; David Rudman; Frankie Cordero
- Theme music composer: Bill Sherman
- Opening theme: "With Our Pal Donkey Hodie" performed by Taylor Iman Jones, Haley Jenkins, Frankie Cordero, Stephanie D'Abruzzo, and David Rudman
- Ending theme: "With Our Pal Donkey Hodie" (instrumental)
- Composers: Bill Sherman; Zack Zeyde; Noah Deblasis
- Country of origin: United States
- Original language: English
- No. of seasons: 3
- No. of episodes: 79 (154 segments) (list of episodes)

Production
- Executive producers: David Rudman; Adam Rudman; Ellen Doherty
- Producers: Adam Rudman; David Rudman; Ellen Doherty; Kristin DiQuollo
- Running time: 23 minutes (two 11-minute segments)
- Production companies: Spiffy Pictures; Fred Rogers Productions

Original release
- Network: PBS Kids
- Release: May 3, 2021 – present

Related
- Mister Rogers' Neighborhood; Daniel Tiger's Neighborhood; Nature Cat

Donkey Hodie is an American puppet live action musical children's television series created by David and Adam Rudman for PBS Kids, and is aimed at preschoolers ages 3 to 5. Inspired by characters created by Fred Rogers, the series premiered May 3, 2021, and is the second spin-off of Rogers' television series Mister Rogers' Neighborhood after Daniel Tiger's Neighborhood. The first full episode was initially set to premiere in the winter of 2021 on PBS Kids in the United States, but it was pushed back to May 3 of the same year.

== Plot ==
In the land of Someplace Else, just north of the Neighborhood of Make-Believe, Donkey Hodie and her friends go throughout their day while solving different problems along the way.

== Cast ==
- Haley Jenkins as Donkey Hodie, the granddaughter of Grampy Hodie (the original Donkey Hodie). Like her grandfather, her name is a pun on the novel Don Quixote. She's eponymously named, sunny and brave.
- Stephanie D'Abruzzo as Duck Duck, Harriet Elizabeth Cow, Mama Panda, and Doc Skunk; Duck Duck's name is eponymous.
- David Rudman as Bob Dog, an upbeat orange dog, Grampy Hodie and Stanley the Dragon.
- Frankie Cordero as Purple Panda and Turtle Lou.
- Peter Linz as Clyde the Cloud.
- Matt Vogel as King Friday, the ruler of the Neighborhood of Make-Believe.
- Joey Mazzarino as Game Show Gator and Super Porcupine.
- Leslie Carrara-Rudolph as Dodie Hodie, Donkey's cousin.
- Jimmica Collins as Rockstar Penguin.
- Melvin Campbell as Rogers the Fish

The original Donkey Hodie, Bob Dog, Purple Panda, Harriet Cow and King Friday all originated on Mister Rogers' Neighborhood. All other characters were newly created for the Donkey Hodie series.

== Episodes ==
Season	Segments	Episodes	Originally released	
Season	Segments	Episodes	First released	Last released
1	79	40	May 3, 2021	February 23, 2023
2	48	25	August 14, 2023	April 17, 2025
3	28	15	August 11, 2025	TBA

== Production ==
The series was announced in January 2020. The title character is the granddaughter of the original Donkey Hodie, a character from the Neighborhood of Make Believe on Mister Rogers' Neighborhood.

=== Music ===
Like Daniel Tiger's Neighborhood, the series includes both new songs as well as songs written by Rogers.

The music for the show was composed by Bill Sherman, Zack Zeyde, and Noah Deblasis.

== Awards and nominations ==
Year	Award	Category	Nominee(s)	Result	Ref.
2021	Television Critics Association Awards	Outstanding Achievement in Youth Programming	Donkey Hodie	Nominated	
2022	Children's and Family Emmy Awards	Outstanding Lighting Design for a Live Action Program	Joel K. Flory and Mark Kluiszo	Nominated	
2022	Writers Guild of America Awards	Television: Children’s Script	Adam Rudman, David Rudman, and Joey Mazzarino	Nominated	
2023	Children's and Family Emmy Awards	Outstanding Puppetry Performance	Harley Jenkins	Nominated	
2023	Children's and Family Emmy Awards	Outstanding Puppetry Performance	Frankie Cordero	Nominated	
2023	Television Critics Association Awards	Outstanding Achievement in Children's Programming	Donkey Hodie	Nominated	
2025	Children's and Family Emmy Awards	Outstanding Preschool Series	Donkey Hodie	Nominated	
2025	Children's and Family Emmy Awards	Outstanding Interactive Media	Cousin Hodie Playdate	Won	
2025	Television Critics Association Awards	Outstanding Achievement in Children's Programming	Donkey Hodie	Nominated	
