= Bert is Evil =

Parody website

Bert is Evil is the name of a parody website, founded by Dino Ignacio on March 30, 1997, which featured Bert, a character on the American children's television program Sesame Street. In 1998, Dino Ignacio, Wout Reinders and Jasper Hulshoff Pol accepted the Webby Award and the People's Voice Award for Best Weird Website at the Palace of Fine Arts auditorium in San Francisco.

The website featured manipulated images of the character consorting with notoriously nefarious figures, such as Adolf Hitler, Saddam Hussein, Kim Jong-il, Robert Mugabe, and Osama bin Laden, as well as being present at events, such as the JFK assassination, and Oklahoma City bombing, humorously offered as "proof" that Bert was no mere innocent children's television character. The "Evil Bert" phenomenon was picked up by other humorists, who created their own images, linking Bert to current and historical atrocities.

In the summer of 1998, due to the website's immense cult popularity, it became too expensive for Ignacio to continue running. Instead of shutting the site down, he offered to allow anyone who was willing to mirror his original website the opportunity to host it. As a result, dozens of mirrors appeared, increasing the website's popularity and visibility.

== Osama bin Laden image ==
A photoshopped image of Bert with Osama bin Laden, posted to the website in 1998, went on to appear at a 2001 protest rally in Bangladesh

The first mirror, maintained by Dennis Pozniak, continued in the same vein by adding new "evidence" of Bert's evilness (such as Bert's connection to the Ramsey Family and serial killer Jack the Ripper). At the end of 1998, Pozniak posted a contribution, submitted by humorist J Roen, digitally manipulated to depict the then relatively unknown international terrorist, Osama bin Laden, posing with Bert.

In October 2001, after the September 11 attacks, an undoctored Reuters news photograph was published showing a pro Osama bin Laden protest rally in Bangladesh. One protester is seen holding a large collage style poster of bin Laden with a small image of Bert over his right shoulder – the same image posted to the Bert mirror in 1998 – which prompted much confusion and joking among Western audiences. Being unaware of Sesame Street, Dhaka printer Mostafa Kamal had copied the collage from the internet, leaving the image of Bert in his collage.

After this photo was released on the news wires, the owners of Sesame Street, Sesame Workshop, raised the possibility of pursuing legal action against Ignacio. In response, he took down the "Bert is Evil" section of his website due to Sesame Workshop's DMCA takedown notice, also stating that he did not want to undermine the character in the eyes of children who watched Sesame Street. "I am doing this because I feel this has gotten too close to reality", he said.

Since the original Bert/Osama picture had been posted to Dennis Pozniak's mirror, he too was bombarded by the international media seeking interviews. As a result of all the attention, Pozniak also closed his mirror.

== See also ==
- Humor on the internet
- Photograph manipulation
- List of Internet phenomena
