= List of Sesame Street recurring segments =

This is a list of miscellaneous recurring segments on the children's daytime program, Sesame Street.

== Current segments ==
=== Tales From 123 ===
This animated segment that debuted in Season 56 features the adventures of the Sesame Street characters inside the titular apartment.

=== Cookie Monster's Foodie Truck ===
Introduced in Season 48, the segments star Cookie Monster and Gonger (from The Furchester Hotel), working in their own food truck and fielding orders from live children via video message. To complete their recipe, the monsters drive the truck to a specific location and learn about where certain foods originally come from. The segment premiered on HBO on November 18, 2017 and has aired 77 episodes so far.

== Former segments ==
=== Sesame Street Nature Explorers (seasons 54–55) ===
First aired in season 54, the five-minute animated segment star Elmo, his puppy Tango, and Gabrielle (with a little help from Grandma Nell), who go on adventures to discover different parts of nature.

=== Elmo & Tango's Mysterious Mysteries (seasons 52–55) ===
First aired in season 52, this animated segment shows Elmo and his new puppy Tango solving mysteries around Sesame Street.

=== Cookie's Crumby Pictures ===
Aired in season 44. A new segment about Cookie Monster in movie preview parodies. Fifteen segments aired over two seasons from 2013 through 2015.

=== Smart Cookies ===
Aired in season 46. The segments star Cookie Monster as the rookie agent of a team of crime-fighting cookies called "Smart Cookies." His teammates include leader Chipowski, tech-guy Figby and clue-diviner Miss Fortune. In each episode, Cookie Monster learns about self-control and regulation as the team thwarts the dastardly attacks of a villainous baker known simply as "The Crumb." Eleven segments were aired during Season 46-48 from 2016 to 2018.

=== Letter of the Day ===
The "Letter of the Day", or "Cookie's Letter Time", is a segment introduced in season 33 (2002). Cookie Monster hosted the segment with cameo appearances by guests for the first two years. The original segments involved a letter written in icing on a cookie, which Cookie Monster tried to stop himself from eating, but invariably ate it. In season 35 (2004), Prairie Dawn joined "Letter of the Day"; the segments in this incarnation were almost similar, with a foam letter used instead of an icing one. Segments produced in seasons 36 (2005) and 37 (2006) involved "The Letter of the Day Games": a game show introduced by an energetic off-camera announcer (voiced by Matt Vogel). In season 39 (2008), the letter segments were made connecting to the street scene for that episode, featuring other characters instead of Cookie Monster. From season 40 to 44 (2009–2014), Murray Monster hosts both the Letter and Number of the day segments. A brief clip of the 2002 version of this segment was seen in Sesame Street's 2002-2006 opening sequence. From Season 46 to 55, The 'Letter of the Day" is usually the first letter of the associated word of the episode's theme.

Starting with season 45, Elmo took the lead of a new song (along with Big Bird, Abby Cadabby, Grover, Bert, Ernie, Cookie Monster, Rosita and Murray Monster), which encouraged viewers as they introduced the letter of the day. A similar version debuted in season 47, led by Abby Cadabby.

A new version of the song was recorded for Season 50, notably featuring a same lead vocal by Elmo and with Zoe and Rudy replacing Murray in the character lineup.

In season 55, a new version of the letter of the day was recorded, featuring the new characters: Count from the number of the day, Two-Headed Monster and Baby Bear in this song features clapping and stomping.

=== Number of the Day ===
The "Number of the Day" segment is hosted by Count von Count. The numbers range from zero to twenty. Initially in season 33 (2002), the segment was presented with the Count playing his pipe organ; and when he reached the number of the day, balloons, confetti and the number appeared. If the number of the day was zero, the organ vanished in a puff of smoke. In seasons 36 (2005) and 37 (2006), the number of the day was revealed at a restaurant, with the Count and his girlfriend Countess Dahling von Dahling present. The Count sang a song, asking whether the number of the day was one, two, etc. When he reached the number of the day, the Countess shouted, "STOP!" The segments with the Countess were mainly used for numbers eleven through twenty. Also in seasons 36 and 37, the number of the day was found by using a jack-in-the-box (which was similar to the Numerosity segments used in the show's early seasons), which was mainly used for numbers one through ten, and some in season 37 involved the Count interacting with children. From season 40 to 45 (2009–2015), Murray Monster hosts both the Letter and Number of the day segments. A brief clip of the 2002 version of this segment was seen in Sesame Street's 2002-2006 opening sequence.

Starting with season 45, Count von Count took the lead of a new song (along with Big Bird, Abby Cadabby, Elmo, Grover, Bert, Ernie, Cookie Monster, Rosita and Murray Monster), encouraging viewers as they introduced the number of the day. A similar version debuted in season 47, led by Cookie Monster.

A new song debuted in season 50, led by Elmo and Abby Cadabby as astronauts in outer space counting Martians.

In season 55, another song was featured led by Elmo and Tango dancing together and counting toys.

=== Abby's Amazing Adventures ===
Introduced in Season 49, the series stars Abby Cadabby and her stepbrother Rudy in animated form. The segment aired from November 17, 2018 to June 24, 2021 and has aired 13 episodes so far.

=== Big Bird's Road Trip ===
In the series, Big Bird interviews a child from cities across the United States of America (as well as the occasional international locale). The interviews are presented as video chats back home to Elmo on Sesame Street. Following Big Bird's arrival in California, the segment's format changed to having pre-recorded interviews with children as Big Bird and Elmo watch them back on Sesame Street. This segment aired during Season 50.

=== I Wonder, What If, Let's Try ===
The recurring segment highlighted, as the children thinking process in creative playful problem-solving hosted by Elmo. It was first aired since season 51.

=== Celebrating Me, Celebrating You, Celebrating Us! ===
Hosted by Elmo. It was first aired in season 53.

=== Abby's Flying Fairy School ===
These computer-animated segments feature fairy-in-training Abby Cadabby. Abby goes to Fairy School, learning from Mrs. Sparklenose. Her class features all new characters: classmates Blögg and Gonnigan, fairies, trolls, and a part-gerbil part-unicorn called Niblet. Episodes of the preschool series are eight to nine minutes long and debuted during season 40. From season 40-45, 26 shorts were made between seasons 40-43.

=== Super Grover 2.0 ===
This title is an upgraded version of Super Grover, a superheroic Muppet who saves the world helping the others. One of the segments has a talking Chicken in the Great Wall of China. Eighteen episodes were aired over seasons 41-45, from 2010 to 2015.

=== What's the Word on the Street? ===
What's the Word on the Street? first appeared in 2007. Murray Monster hosts the segment which precedes the corporate sponsor spots before each episode. He speaks with people about what the word of the day means and instructs the audience to listen for its usage in the following episode. It was used from season 38 through season 45 (2007–2015).

=== Great Moments at the Sink ===
This is a sketch that began in 1996 in which children perform healthy acts (e.g. brushing your teeth, washing your hands, washing your face) near a sink.

=== The Adventures of Trash Gordon ===
At the end of each episode from Season 35–37 (2004–2006), and some from Season 38 (2007), Oscar the Grouch reads Slimey the Worm a chapter of Trash Gordon, a book with over 900 chapters, before going to sleep. It is about a man named Trash Gordon (Gordon) who visits distant planets. At the end, Trash would announce the sponsors of the day.

=== Hero Guy ===
Hero Guy was a sketch from 2001–2002. In a series of 11 sketches, Baby Bear brings Hero Guy to life by drawing a picture of him and singing his theme song. These sketches first aired in Season 32, and appeared on occasions until Season 38. When Hero Guy, who is also a bear, springs to life as an animated character, he and Baby Bear embark on adventures together. Although they often face unexpected challenges, Hero Guy never fails to save the day. A brief clip of this was seen in Sesame Street's 2002 opening sequence.

=== Spanish Word of the Day ===
The "Spanish Word of the Day" aired in 2002 and remained through 2005. In the segments, a character teaches a Spanish word and its English translation. Usually, the segment features Rosita, Grover, Maria or Gabi. A brief clip of this was seen in Sesame Street's 2002 opening sequence.

=== Journey to Ernie ===
"Journey to Ernie" is a game of hide-and-seek. Big Bird must locate Ernie in a box with Ernie's striped shirt and his rubber duckie, but it may not be the first or even the second boxes that Big Bird finds. If Ernie is not in a box, then a sketch or song is featured. Then the game resumes after that segment is played out. When Ernie is found it is followed up by a sketch or song featuring Ernie with or without Bert.

In 2003, the segment changed with Big Bird looking for clues and finds Ernie in a location that is hinted at in the beginning. This is played out in a complete narrative without any diversions as it was in the first format of "Journey to Ernie." One recurring gag in the second format is Big Bird asking The Two-Headed Monster where Ernie is, with the Two-Headed Monster pointing both left and right. Occasionally, there are surprises. For example, Telly Monster will hide in a triangle, Bert decides to hide instead of Ernie or Big Bird hides and Ernie seeks. At the end, when Big Bird finally discovers Ernie, they sing, and the game ends. In both formats, Ernie is featured in the sketch which follows "Journey to Ernie." A brief clip from Journey to Ernie appears in the 2003-2006 intro.

Despite the popularity of the segment among the younger viewers, according to the 2009 book Sesame Street: A Celebration - 40 Years of Life on the Street, the segment was eventually dropped after 2005 because "The look and feel of the animation was too similar to other shows on the television schedule and, while funny, it didn't mesh with the whole show."

=== Monster Clubhouse ===
Monster Clubhouse is a recurring Sesame Street segment that debuted during Season 32 featuring energetic young monster friends Mooba, Mel, Narf, and Groogle. For season 33, Mooba was renamed Googel and Groogle was renamed Phoebe. In season 33, the segments were shortened, and the monsters would do three or four of the activities. They are snack time, furry feeling/shape/animal sound of the day, dance time, nap time, mail time, and being pursued by an elephant. Despite being dropped from the show after 2003, Monster Clubhouse still appeared in Sesame Street's 2002-2006 intro.

According to the 2009 book Sesame Street: A Celebration - 40 Years of Life on the Street the segment was discontinued after 2003 because, "kids didn't know the new Muppets and became confused, and the frenetic pace of the segment raised concerns. The puppets Mooba, Mel, Narf, and Groogel literally bounced off the walls. So it was abandoned after just two seasons."

=== Dinner Theatre ===
Dinner Theatre is a food-themed successor to Monsterpiece Theater, introduced in 2006. The segment remained on the show up until the 2010s. The series parodies plays and films to stress the importance of mealtime and healthy eating habits.

=== Murray Has a Little Lamb ===
Introduced during Season 39, this segment features Murray and his lamb friend Ovejita visiting different kinds of schools to learn what they do at the school and speak with teachers and students. A song will play before the segment, allowing Murray to wait for his lamb. The lamb will give clues in Spanish; examples include soccer, music, baseball and gymnastics. The title is a play on words of the Mother Goose nursery rhyme Mary Had a Little Lamb.

=== Monsters in Day Care ===
Monsters in Day Care was a recurring segment premiering in 1998. Herry Monster visits a real child or group of children at a daycare center. He engages in conversation with them before heading back to monster daycare to inform the monsters what he learned.

=== Worms in Space ===
Worms in Space first aired in 1997, in which Slimey and his fellow WASA astronauts form letters or numbers aboard the Wiggleprise.

=== Super Morphin Mega Monsters ===
Super Morphin Mega Monsters was a recurring segment in the 1990s written as a parody of Power Rangers. The characters Elmo-saurus, Zoe-ceratops, Telly-dactyl, and Rosita-raptor would "morph" into caped and helmeted outfits when trouble arose. In contrast to the fight scenes on the real Power Rangers, the Mega Monsters would run around and wave their arms in vaguely martial arts-style motions, but would only reason with others instead of attacking.

=== Bert and Ernie's Great Adventures ===
Debuted in Season 39 and hosted by Bert and Ernie in clay animation where they go on various adventures.

=== Ernie's Show and Tell ===
Hosted by Ernie where he has children show him items.

=== Cecille ===
These stop-motion musical segments feature a female orange clay ball who sings about the segment's theme, from brushing teeth in western style to about herself. The segments ran from Seasons 22-39 (1990–2008).

=== Murray's Science Experiments ===
Hosted by Murray where he performs experiments to help children learn all about science.

=== Global Grover ===
Hosted by Grover by going around the world. He would tell the viewers where he went, followed by a film segment regarding that place. A brief clip from Global Grover appears in the 2003-2006 intro.

Global Grover was also made into a separate 5-minute, 30-episode series in the fall of 2005. It premiered on Playhouse Disney in Asia in 2006.

=== Mysterious Theatre ===
Mysterious Theatre was a recurring segment that was introduced in Season 20 (1988–1989) as a parody of Masterpiece Mystery. It is hosted by Vincent Twice Vincent Twice (a parody of Vincent Price). He introduces an episode of The Adventures of Sherlock Hemlock: The World's Greatest Detective, where Sherlock Hemlock and his dog Watson solve crimes and mysteries.

=== Postcards from Big Bird ===
Hosted by Big Bird who goes to different places from around the world, starting in the mid-90s.

=== Spaceship Surprise ===
Spaceship Surprise was a recurring segment that was introduced in Season 20 (1988–1989) as a parody of Star Trek. It features the captain and his friend going to strange planets (such as CH, TR, and SH). There was also the one based on Star Trek: The Next Generation, where the new crew went to the planet H.

=== Global Thingy ===
Animated segment about various creatures and their everyday situations, produced by Jim Jinkins and his studio, Cartoon Pizza. The main character, Global Thingy, is a large globe who helps the creatures with their situations.

=== Here Is Your Life ===
Here Is Your Life was a recurring segment that was a parody of This Is Your Life. It was hosted by Guy Smiley (and later Sonny Friendly). It shows an object about their life.

=== Big Bird's Art Gallery ===
A segment that appears on Season 32 of Sesame Street where Big Bird, mostly accompanied by some of his friends, go to a museum and look at a famous painting.

=== Camp Wannagohoma ===
Camp Wannagohoma was a recurring segment where Camp Counselor Grover and the camp kids explored nature. Anytime Grover gave something the wrong name, the kids would say in unison "NO, IT'S NOT!" and explain what it really was.

=== Miami Mice ===
Miami Mice was a recurring segment that was introduced in season 18 (1986–1987) as a parody of Miami Vice. The segment involves J.P. Mouse and Tito Mouse as they solve crimes and mysteries.

=== Blue Bird ===
Blue Bird was a sketch from Season 20 (1988–1989). In a series of two sketches, Big Bird creates a comic book of Blue Bird for his everyday problems. The first sketch was Maria cannot take Big Bird to the Around the Corner playground because she is busy fixing toasters. The other sketch had Bob missing a pair of socks.

=== Colambo the Detective Sheep ===
Colambo the Detective Sheep was a recurring segment that features a detective sheep named Inspector Colambo (a parody of Inspector Columbo) on the crimes of Mother Goose and Fairy Tale stories. Segments included The Great Plum Plunder, The Case of the Lost Mittens, The Lost Slipper Caper, etc.

=== The American Revolution ===
The American Revolution was a recurring segment on Sesame Street that was introduced in Season 20 (1988–1989). It stars the characters of Sesame Street as people from 1776 when the United States of America was born.

=== Lifestyles of the Big and Little ===
Lifestyles of the Big and Little was a recurring segment that was introduced in Season 18 (1986–1987) as a parody of Lifestyles of the Rich and Famous. It is hosted by Dicky Tick (a parody of Robin Leech) as he shows the world about the very very big, and the very very little. Only two skits were made.

=== What's My Part? ===
What's My Part? was a recurring yet short-lived segment on Sesame Street that was introduced in Season 2 (1970–1971). It was a spoof of What's My Line? and was hosted by Guy Smiley. Only two skits were made: the Nose and the Foot. However, Guy Smiley continued to appear in other recurring game show segments for many future seasons, such as Name That Sound and Beat the Time.

=== Primitive ===
A prehistoric stop-motion series based on the works of Francesco Misseri, starring a different-colored facial haired caveman duo, the somewhat conceited and mischievous brown-haired caveman with two teeth on the top of his mouth (voiced by Eric Jacobson), and his best friend the cheerful and good-natured redhead without teeth and wearing a bone necklace (voiced by Joey Mazzarino). The shorts debuted in 2003 and ran until 2012.

=== Kid Mural Painting ===
Six number of the day skits (14-19) that would see use in the show from 1997 to 2010, where a group of young kids in white t-shirts and painter's overalls start by analyzing a small mural template in the grass. They then set up to paint the large mural on a big canvas tied between two trees in a backyard in time-lapse form. In between the rapid painting sequences, different kids run up and show the featured number of the day painted on their hands in various colors such as black and white, blue, green or yellow. Alternatively, the group of kids work together to hold up a blonde girl (who's part of the group), to show the number of the day on her bare feet (painted in purple on her soles along with small purple and yellow dots on her toes), to be seen. Also during the segment, the group is also shown playfully splattering paint all around each other or pressing it on panels of glass with their hands and feet just for fun. At the end, the painters show their now finished mural.

=== Madlenka ===
An animated short series based on the picture book series by Peter Sis after Global Grover sharing the place with Global Thingy that only debuted in 2004. This series focuses on a 6-year-old girl named Madlenka (voiced by Stephanie D'Abruzzo).

=== Sneak Peek Previews ===
Sneak Peek Previews was a recurring segment on Sesame Street that was introduced in Season 15 (1983–1984). It was a spoof of At the Movies with Roger Ebert and Gene Siskel. It is hosted by Telly Monster and Oscar the Grouch. Telly gives the movies the "WOW!"s and Oscar gives the movies the "PHOOEY!"s. In one sketch, Ebert and Siskel appeared and showed Telly and Oscar what thumbs up and thumbs down means (thumbs up means that they like the movie and thumbs down means that they do not like the movie). This was featured prominently in the Sesame Street video "Sing Yourself Sillier at the Movies" (1997).

=== Suzie Kabloozie ===
A series of shorts produced by Mo Willems, they featured a young girl named Suzie Kabloozie (voiced by Ruth Buzzi), and her pet cat Feff (also voiced by Buzzi), and would sing about certain subjects like imagination and reading, or announce the Number of the Day. The segments ran from Seasons 26–39 (1994–2008).

=== Noodles & Nedd ===
A series of shorts produced by John R. Dilworth and his studio, Stretch Films, that were introduced in Season 29. The shorts follow an eccentric yellow man named Nedd, and his somewhat more intelligent purple cat named Noodles, as they solve their everyday problems.
