= Betty Lou =

Betty Lou is a feminine double name. Notable people with the name include:

- Betty Lou Bailey (1929–2007), American mechanical engineer
- Betty Lou Beets (1937–2000), murderer executed in Texas
- BettyLou DeCroce (born 1952), American politician from New Jersey
- Betty Lou Gerson (1914–1999), American actress
- Betty Lou Holland (1926–2021), American actress
- Betty Lou Keim (1938–2010), American actress
- Betty Lou Mitchell (born 1937), American politician from Maine
- Betty Lou Raskin (died 2010), American chemist from Maryland
- Betty Lou Varnum (1931–2021), American television personality
- Betty Lou Young (1919–2010), American writer and conservationist

== See also ==
- Tommy Riggs and Betty Lou, radio situation comedy
