= Two-Headed Monster =

Sesame Street Muppet character

- Sesame Street character
- First appearance: Mr. Snufflepagus cleans his pajamas (February 27, 1978)
- Created by: Jim Henson
- Performed by: Left Head: Richard Hunt (1978); Jerry Nelson (1978–1999); Joey Mazzarino (2001–2016); Martin P. Robinson (2002); Matt Vogel (2002); Eric Jacobson (2016–present); Stephanie D'Abruzzo (2017); Right Head: Peter Friedman (1978); Richard Hunt (1978–1991); Adam Hunt (1995); David Rudman (1998–present); Joey Mazzarino (2002)

In-universe information
- Species: Sesame Street Muppet Monster
- Gender: Male
- Nationality: American
- Fur/skin color: Light purple

The Two-Headed Monster is a comical, light purple Muppet monster on the television show Sesame Street, first appearing in season 9, 1978.

== History ==
The Two-Headed Monster, as the name implies, is an example of bicephaly. The right-hand head has purple hair and a black beard, with upturned horns, whereas the left-hand head has black hair and a purple beard, with downturned horns. They have slightly different personalities, with the left-hand head seemingly the more rational and sensible of the two, but also slightly grouchier. Speaking in baby-like gibberish except when emphasizing a word, which is usually enough for them to communicate with others, the monster, in typical sketches, would sound out words in front of a brick wall, then push them together to say the full word, or do something else which involves cooperation. They are physically dicephalic parapagus twins, as their mother made an appearance in one sketch when they sounded the word "mom"; she has a single head and speaks normally. They share a single pair of arms and legs.

== Inspiration ==
The creation of this monster was inspired by performers Jerry Nelson and Richard Hunt playing around on the set one day, saying that they were a monster with two heads. While right-handed performers use their right hands to perform the heads of characters and their left to perform left hands, whoever performs the left half of the monster performs the head with the left hand, and the right hand with their right hand.

== Performers ==
The performers for the Two-Headed Monster are listed in order of the history from the Left Head and the Right Head:

- Richard Hunt and Peter Friedman (ca. 1978)
- Jerry Nelson and Richard Hunt (1978–1991)
- Jerry Nelson and Adam Hunt (Let's Make a Word! PC game, 1995)
- Jerry Nelson and David Rudman (1998–1999)
- Joey Mazzarino and David Rudman (2001–2016)
- Martin P. Robinson and Joey Mazzarino (Episode 4024, 2002)
- Matt Vogel and David Rudman (Episode 4030, 2002)
- Eric Jacobson and David Rudman (2016–present)
- Stephanie D'Abruzzo and David Rudman (Episode 4733, 2017)

== Design team ==
The Two-Headed Monster was designed by Jim Henson and built by Caroly Wilcox.
