= Betty Lou Raskin =

American chemist (1924–2010)

- Raskin, c. 1961
- Born: April 9, 1924; Baltimore, Maryland, U.S.
- Died: December 17, 2010; Pikesville, Maryland, U.S.
- Occupation: Chemist
- Known for: Creation of 'Holey Smoke'

Betty Lou Raskin (April 9, 1924 – December 17, 2010) was an American chemist who researched plastics in the 1950s and 1960s. A Marylander, she grew up in Baltimore and obtained a chemistry degree to begin work at the radiation laboratory of Johns Hopkins University.

One of the primary products she developed while researching polystyrene was a foamed version that she turned into an opaque smoke good for military signaling, skywriting, and potential contamination protection. A part of multiple scientific organizations, she used her membership to promote women in science and spoke out against the cultural discrimination of intelligent and successful women.

== Childhood and education ==
Born in 1924 to a face doctor father Moses Raskin and a superintendent of nursing mother Rose Frank Raskin, Raskin was raised in Baltimore and attended the Robert E. Lee Accelerate Junior High School. She went on to graduate from Western High School in 1940 and attended Goucher College to earn a Bachelor's degree in chemistry. Continuing her education at Johns Hopkins University, she went on to earn a Master's degree in chemistry and a Ph.D. in educational psychology. Her 1968 dissertation was titled The Relative Effect of Occupational and Socio-occupational Information on High School Girls' Expressed Opinions of Women Scientists and Science as a Career.

== Career ==
After graduation, Raskin spent several years at the Homewood Campus in charge of the radiation laboratory's research branch on plastics. According to Raskin, she was the only woman researching polystyrene in the United States during the 1950s. By 1967, the US government stopped providing research grants for plastics research, leading Raskin to leave her position at the Johns Hopkins lab and becoming a psychology lecturer and assistant professor at Towson University while she worked on obtaining her Ph.D. She also changed her research focus to consumer behavior, a new area of study at the time, that she taught as interdisciplinary between psychology and business.

Frequently speaking out about the ability of women in science, Raskin was a long-term advocate for the advancement and inclusion of women scientists. During the late 1950s, she noted that she was one of around 500 women in the American Chemical Society out of over ten thousand members. She stated that it was the incorrect idea of women scientists being "abnormal, unfeminine" that prevented women from deciding to enter scientific fields of study. She presented a paper to the AAAS in December 1958 on how the "brainpower" of women is being wasted by society and general media by not portraying the capabilities of women in science, with her talk at the meeting being titled "American Women: Unclaimed Treasures of Science". In her presentation, she blamed the media for making the mink coat the "symbol of female success" and not the lab coat. An article she wrote on April 19, 1959, in the New York Times titled "Woman's Place Is in the Lab, Too", where she discussed issues facing women in science and societal pressures against women joining scientific fields, was highly commented upon in the media and by the rest of the scientific community.

=== Patents ===
Raskin's work in plastics research resulted in several new methodologies and techniques developed by her for specialized production. A grant from the US Air Force's Wright Air Development Command had her create a method for "fluffing" plastic particles in the air, which she patented as "Holey Smoke" in 1960, though originally referred to as "flokes". The commercial patent was later bought by Dow Chemical and had usability in skywriting, smokescreens, cloud seeding, and protecting farmland from frost. The US government kept a free license to use the material and the Air Force aimed to use it for signaling purposes, because of its capability to give dimensionality to lights and images projected on it. Raskin also suggested in her 1959 American Chemical Society presentation that since the smoke is able to provide a shield against contamination, including in the air, that it could be used to shield against the effects of nuclear explosions.

== Research ==
During her time as a research associate at the Homewood radiation laboratory, Raskin focused on foamed plastics (polystyrene). She described in a presentation to the American Chemical Society that the new expanded foams could be used for construction of a house and provide insulation at the same time.

== Organizations ==
Raskin was a member of the Society of Plastics Engineers and the American Association for the Advancement of Science (AAAS). She became a member of the American Chemical Society in 1948 and later the Maryland representative to the national conference.
