= Bert and Ernie =

Sesame Street characters

Bert (right) with Ernie (left), and his rubber duckie, on Sesame Street in 1977

Bert and Ernie are two Muppet characters who appear together in numerous skits on the children's television show Sesame Street. Ernie acts the role of the naïve and exuberant troublemaker, while Bert is the world-weary foil.

Originated by Frank Oz and Jim Henson, the characters are currently performed by puppeteers Eric Jacobson and Peter Linz.

== History ==
Bert and Ernie were built by Don Sahlin from a simple design scribbled by Jim Henson, creator of The Muppets. Initially, Henson performed Bert, and Oz performed Ernie. After just one day of rehearsal, they switched characters. The original idea was to show that even though two people can have totally different characteristics, they can still be good friends.

According to writer Jon Stone, the relationship between Bert and Ernie reflected the real-life friendship between Oz and Henson. Although their names are commonly believed to have been drawn from those of two minor characters in the Frank Capra film It's a Wonderful Life, sources from within the Sesame Street production team suggest that the identical names were coincidental. The common names were referenced during Bert & Ernie's cameo in Elmo Saves Christmas, when they walk by a TV showing a relevant scene from It's a Wonderful Life.

According to A&E's Biography, Bert and Ernie were virtually the only Muppets to appear in the Sesame Street pilot episode, which was screen-tested to a number of families in July 1969. Their brief appearance was the only part of the pilot that tested well, so it was decided that not only should Muppet characters be the "stars" of the show, but they should also interact with the human characters, something that was not done in the pilot.

An ordinary Bert and Ernie sketch involves Ernie coming up with a hare-brained idea, and Bert trying to talk him out of it, usually getting Bert frustrated and Ernie dumbfounded. For example, if Ernie wanted to do something loud while Bert is doing something quiet like reading a book or the newspaper, Bert would teach him how to be quiet; however, Ernie would still make some noise, which would cause Bert to either lose his temper or leave the room.

== Bert ==
Bert
- Sesame Street character
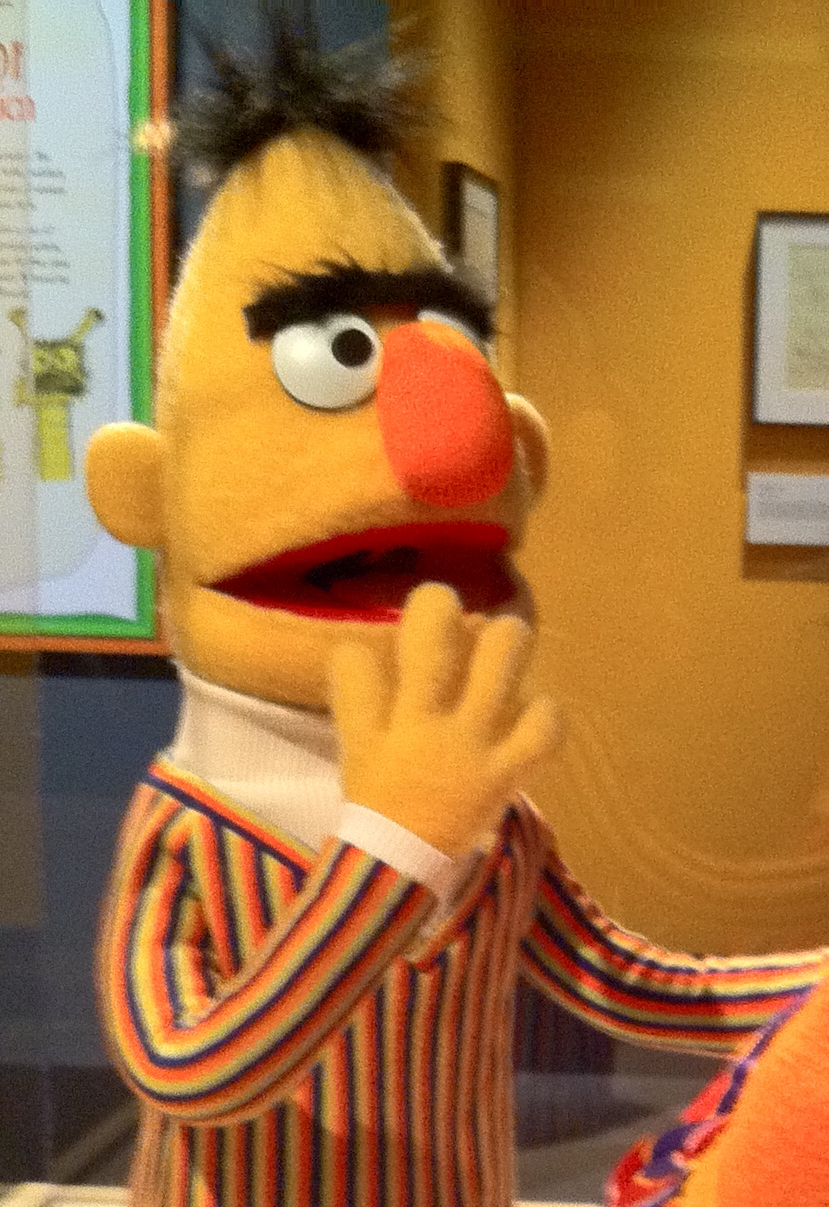
- Bert puppet on display at Chicago's Museum of Science and Industry in 2010
- First appearance: Sesame Street Test Pilot 1 (July 21, 1969)
- Created by: Jim Henson
- Performed by: Frank Oz (1969–2006); Eric Jacobson (1998–present)
- Birthday: July 26

In-universe information
- Species: Humanoid Muppet
- Gender: Male

Bert was initially performed by Frank Oz from 1969 to 2006. Since 1998, Eric Jacobson has been phased in as Bert's primary performer after Oz retired from most of his Muppet duties to focus on directing. Bert is a foamy and plasticky “hand rod puppet", which means that while the puppeteer's right arm is inserted into Bert's head to control the mouth, the puppeteer's left hand uses rods to control the arms of the puppet. Bert has also made cameo appearances within The Muppets franchise, including The Muppet Show, its second pilot episode The Muppet Show: Sex and Violence, The Muppet Movie, and The Muppets Take Manhattan, in addition to an appearance with Ernie on The Flip Wilson Show on September 14, 1972, on which he sang "Clink, Clank", a song about noises.

=== Characteristics ===
Physically, Bert represents a human, with yellow skin, an orange nose, and a vertically elongated head, with a tuft of black hair at the top. Bert has a noted unibrow. Bert typically wears a shirt with vertical stripes, most commonly with orange, blue and green stripes. He also sports green pants and blue & white saddle, pigeon shoes.

As a character, Bert is portrayed as a serious, neat, and, according to Oz, "boring" individual, with apparently dull interests and tastes, such as paper clips, pigeons, and oatmeal.

=== Appearances in spin-off series ===
From Sesame Street season 3 (1971-1972) until season 21 (1989-1990) He and Ernie starred in a daily segment called "Caveman Days". Bert was one of the hosts of the show Play With Me Sesame. Three computer game regular segments that he hosted was "Pigeon Patterns", "Oatmeal Art", and "Perfect Pairs". He and Ernie also star in the claymation series Bert and Ernie's Great Adventures, which aired as inserts on Sesame Street beginning in Season 39.

== Ernie ==
Ernie
- Sesame Street character
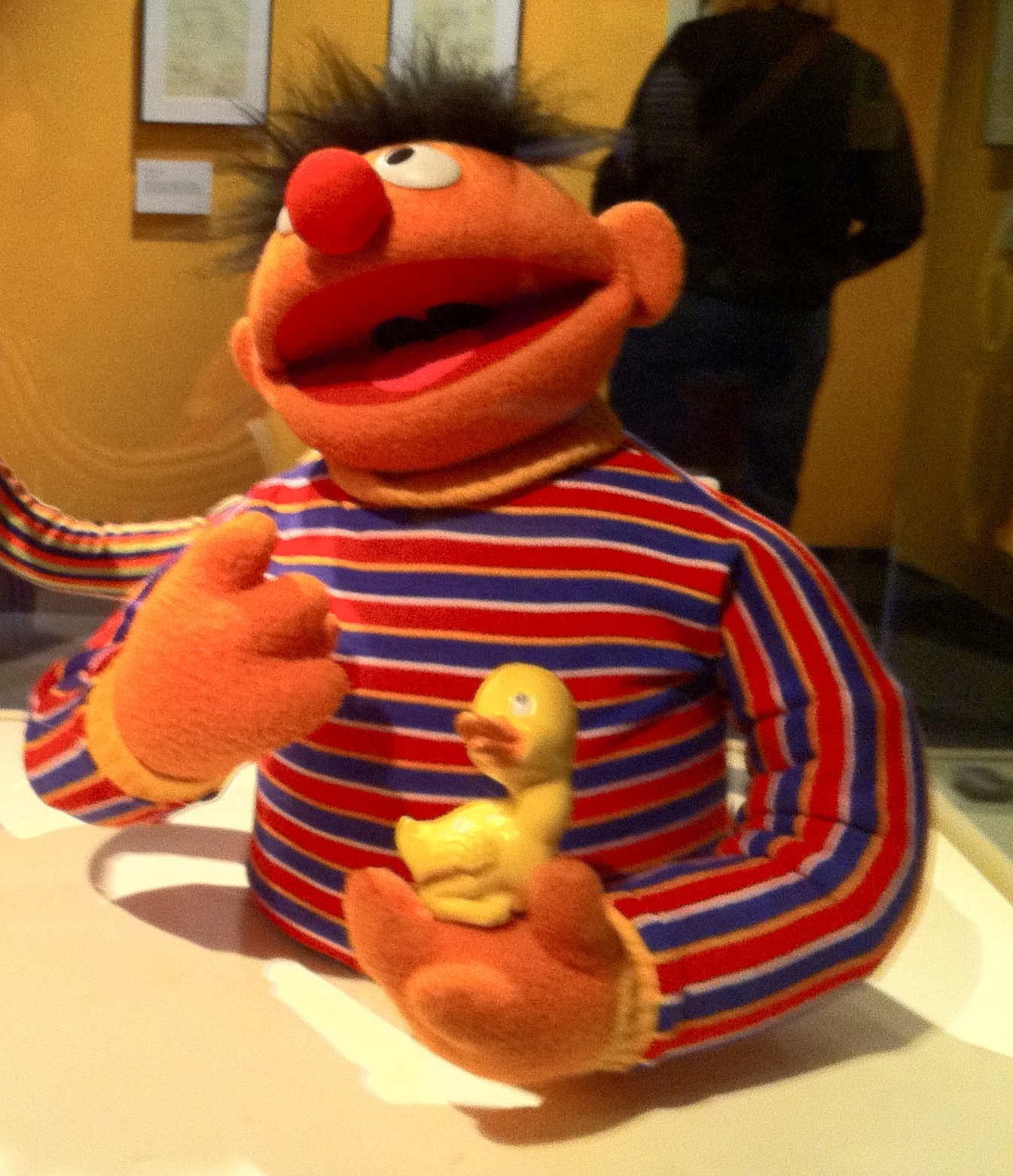
- Ernie puppet on display at Chicago's Museum of Science and Industry in 2010
- First appearance: Sesame Street Test Pilot 1 (July 21, 1969)
- Created by: Jim Henson
- Performed by: Jim Henson (1969–1990); Steve Whitmire (1992–2014); John Tartaglia (2003); Billy Barkhurst (2014–2017); Peter Linz (2017–present)
- Birthday: January 28

In-universe information
- Aliases: Caveman Ernie, Sir Ernie, John Adams, Old King Cole, Tweedle Dum, etc.
- Species: Humanoid Muppet
- Gender: Male

Ernie was originally performed by Jim Henson from 1969 until his death in 1990. Steve Whitmire then played Ernie, beginning in 1992, following Henson's death, until 2014, followed by Billy Barkhurst until 2017. Currently, the character is performed by Peter Linz.

Ernie is a spongy "live hand puppet", meaning that while operating the head of the puppet with his right hand, the puppeteer inserts his left hand into a T-shaped sleeve, capped off with a glove that matches the fabric "skin" of the puppet, thus "becoming" the left arm of the puppet. A second puppeteer usually animates the right arm.

Ernie's performance of "Rubber Duckie," wherein he sings affectionately about his squeaking toy duck and the joy it brings him during bath time, became a modest mainstream hit, reaching No. 16 on the Billboard Hot 100 in September 1970.

=== Appearances in spin-off series ===
From Sesame Street season 3 (1971-1972) until season 21 (1989-1990) He and Bert starred in a daily segment called "Caveman Days". From Sesame Street season 30 (1998-1999) until season 32 (2001), Ernie and the kids starred in a daily segment called "Ernie's Show and Tell". From Sesame Street season 33 (2002) until season 36 (2005), Ernie and Big Bird starred in a daily segment called "Journey to Ernie". Ernie was one of the hosts of the show Play with Me Sesame, where he was occasionally performed by John Tartaglia during the second season. Two regular segments that he hosted was "Ernie Says", a variation of the game Simon Says, and He played on a computer in Ducks in a Row. He and Bert also star in the claymation series Bert and Ernie's Great Adventures, which aired as inserts on Sesame Street beginning in season 39.

=== Roles in other projects ===
Ernie also appears in the finales of The Muppet Movie and The Muppets Take Manhattan, in the last of which he gets a line.

Ernie and Bert introduce a montage of Sesame Street clips in The Muppets: A Celebration of 30 Years. Ernie also narrates a Christmas pageant, 'Twas the Night Before Christmas, in A Muppet Family Christmas. In that same special, Ernie and Bert have a conversation with Doc, making them the only Sesame Street characters (not counting Kermit the Frog) to have interacted with Doc.

=== "Rubber Duckie" song ===
Ernie sang about his affection for Rubber Duckie in a skit, which aired during the first season of Sesame Street. The song "Rubber Duckie" from that skit became a modest mainstream hit, reaching No. 16 on the Billboard Hot 100 in September 1970.

=== Performing Ernie ===
Ernie is a "Live Hand Muppet," meaning that while operating the head of the puppet with his right hand, the puppeteer inserts his left hand into a T-shaped sleeve, capped off with a glove that matches the fabric "skin" of the puppet, thus "becoming" the left arm of the puppet. A second puppeteer usually animates the right arm, although sometimes the right arm is simply stuffed and pinned to the puppet's chest or the second puppeteer will perform both arms. Other puppets of this type include Cookie Monster, Fozzie Bear, Beaker, and Dr. Bunsen Honeydew.

The original segment of the song "I Don't Want to Live on the Moon" was one of the rare instances when Ernie's full body was shown. It reportedly took three puppeteers to perform Ernie in this segment: Jim Henson performed Ernie's head and left hand, while two other puppeteers operated Ernie's right hand and feet respectively.

Jim Henson's original Ernie puppet is on display at the Center for Puppetry Arts in Atlanta, Georgia.

== Appearances ==
A typical Bert and Ernie skit has Ernie coming up with a harebrained idea, and Bert trying to talk him out of it, ending with Bert losing his temper, while Ernie becomes oblivious to his own bad idea.

Other sketches have involved Bert and Ernie sharing a snack by division, but finding that one of them has a bit more; Ernie humorously decides to try to make it even by eating the extra piece, which goes forth until the entire snack is all eaten up. Others have also involved Ernie eating part of Bert's snack he prepares for himself, and when Bert comes back from somewhere, Ernie tries to make several (usually unsuccessful) attempts to cover up the crime in front of Bert.

Some other plotlines involved Ernie wanting to play a game with Bert, who would much rather do something else (like read). Ernie keeps irking Bert with the game until Bert joins — and usually, by the time Bert starts enjoying the game, Ernie is tired of playing the game and wants to do something else.

Ernie makes appearances without Bert, usually within the framework of another double act. He has regularly appeared in skits with Grover, Cookie Monster, Sherlock Hemlock and Lefty the Salesman.

Bert and Ernie also appear in Out to Lunch (1974), and are the hosts of this crossover special.

In Christmas Eve on Sesame Street (1978), Ernie decides to buy Bert a cigar box to store his paper clips in. As he does not have any money, he trades his own Rubber Duckie for it. At the same time, Bert decides to get Ernie a soap dish to put his Rubber Duckie in, so that it will not keep falling into the tub, but has to trade his paper clips for it. Thankfully, Mr. Hooper can tell that neither of them really wants to give up their prized possessions, and so gives them their things back as presents.

In Sesame Street... 20 Years & Still Counting (1989), Bert and Ernie get a new video camera, and Ernie talks Bert into using the camera to record footage of Sesame Street so that they can watch Sesame Street on television.

Bert and Ernie appear in both of the Sesame Street movies. In Follow That Bird (1985), they search for Big Bird by plane. Ernie pilots the plane, and eventually, after they find Big Bird, he flies the plane upside-down, singing "Upside Down World". However, after they lose Big Bird, Ernie blames Bert.

Ernie appears in the video special 123 Count with Me (1997), teaching Humphrey and Ingrid at the Furry Arms Hotel how counting can be very useful.

== In popular culture ==
=== Sexual orientation discussion ===
Because Bert and Ernie share an apartment and a bedroom, some have speculated that they are a representation of a gay couple. Sesame Workshop has consistently refuted this theory, maintaining that as puppets, the characters possess no sexual orientation. In addition, some of Bert's interactions with female characters imply that he is attracted to women, such as serenading Connie Stevens in an episode of The Muppet Show, and recording a song about his girlfriend, "I Want to Hold Your Ear", which was released on several albums.

In July 2013, The New Yorker magazine chose an image of Bert and Ernie by artist Jack Hunter, titled Moment of Joy, as the cover of their publication, which covers the Supreme Court decisions on the Defense of Marriage Act and California's Proposition 8.

In September 2018, Mark Saltzman, one of the script and songwriters for Sesame Street, stated in an interview with Queerty that when he wrote Bert and Ernie, they were often analogues for his own intimate relationship with film editor Arnold Glassman. Though Saltzman did not explicitly say Bert and Ernie were intended as a gay couple, online articles reported so.

Frank Oz, who previously performed as Bert, stated Bert and Ernie were not gay, saying:

They're not, of course, a gay couple. But why that question? Does it really matter? Why the need to define people as only gay? There's much more to a human being than just straightness or gayness.

The Gay Star News reported that fans reacted negatively to Sesame Workshop's statement. Frank Oz later tweeted in September 2018:

A last thought: If Jim and I had created Bert and Ernie as gay characters they would be inauthentic, coming from two straight men. However, I have now learned that many view them as representative of a loving gay relationship. And that's pretty wonderful. Thanks for helping me understand.

=== Parody and other uses ===
From March 30, 1997, to c. 2002, the parody website "Bert is Evil" displayed Bert in a number of doctored photographs, implicating him in crimes ranging from the Assassination of John F. Kennedy to those of Jack the Ripper. A similar image from another source and featuring Bert conferring with Osama bin Laden was mistakenly included by a Bangladeshi print shop on a series of protest signs in October 2001 and 2002.

The German comedy sketch series, Freitag Nacht News, had a recurring sketch called Bernie und Ert created by Attik Kargar, who performed the puppets and supplied the voice of Bernie. Bernie and Ert are a parody of Ernie and Bert, and especially redubbed on Sesamstrasse. The puppets had no noses, one eye each, and swapped hairstyles. Depicting them as a dysfunctional gay couple of petty criminals (Bernie being a promiscuous bisexual), each sketch focused on typically adult themes such as crime, drug abuse, masturbation, and Friday the 13th. In February 2003, Bernie and Ert were dropped from the series because of legal concerns; however, older sketches circulate on the internet such as YouTube.

Bernie and Ert also appeared in a Freitag Nacht News sequence called Bullzeye in a sketch called "Popo Club". Bernie and Ert both wore black masks and leather jackets, disguised as Unknown No. 1 and Unknown No. 2 respectively, with another character named Winfred, propagating bizarre sexual practices. This skit became popular that it resulted in more skits called "Popo Club" featuring Unknowns No. 1 and 2, with occasional appearances by Winfred.

The musical Avenue Q, an adult-oriented parody of Sesame Street, features a pair of characters named Rod (performed by John Tartaglia) and Nicky (performed by Rick Lyon), who are parodies of Bert and Ernie, respectively. Rod is a conservative investment banker and closeted homosexual, while Nicky is his slacker roommate who suspects that Rod may be gay.

Ernie and Bert were spoofed in a 2002 tragicomedy short film called Ernest and Bertram written and directed by Peter Spears. The film is based on Lillian Hellman's The Children's Hour and depicts Ernie and Bert after they are outed by Variety magazine. Although the film was a success at the Sundance Film Festival and the U.S Comedy Arts Festival, it kept from further distribution when Sesame Workshop served the film's producers with a cease and desist order for copyright violation.

In the pilot episode of Eerie, Indiana, which aired in 1991, Marshal and Simon are subtly asked for help by a pair of twin brothers named Bertram and Ernest (called Bert and Ernie for short), because their mother has forced them to sleep every night in her Forever Ware containers, thus having kept them at age twelve for over thirty years. This could allude to the fact Bert and Ernie have not aged in all the years that Sesame Street has aired.

In April 2013, a pair of high energy neutrinos detected at the IceCube Neutrino Observatory, possibly of extragalactic origin, were nicknamed "Bert" and "Ernie". The British soap opera EastEnders has confirmed that characters Bert and Ernie Moon are named after the Muppets.

== Discography ==
As the duo often sing in their skits, several albums were released, containing studio recorded versions of their songs. Bert's best known song is "Doin' the Pigeon". He and Ernie both had their own video, The Best of Ernie and Bert, and their own album, Bert and Ernie's Greatest Hits. Only Ernie, however, has hit the U.S. Billboard Hot 100 with his song "Rubber Duckie", in September 1970.

== Internationally ==
Sesame Street is localized for some different markets.

- Arab World, Iftah Ya Simsim, Bert is "Badr", and Ernie is "Anis". They are called "Anis w Badr" (Arabic: أنيس وبدر)
- Brazil, Vila Sésamo, Bert is "Beto", and Ernie is "Ênio". They're called "Ênio e Beto".
- Catalonia, Barri Sèsam, in the Catalan-language version, they are "Epi i Blai".
- Egypt, Alam Simsim, Bert is "Hadi", and Ernie is Shadi. They are known as "Shadi w Hadi".
- France, 1, Rue Sésame, Bert is "Bart" and Ernie is "Ernest". They are called "Ernest et Bart". In the French version, when Bert's brother Bart comes to visit, he is called "Bert".
- Germany, Sesamstraße, they are called "Ernie und Bert".
- India, Galli Galli Sim Sim, they are called Bert aur Ernie.
- Israel, Rechov Sumsum, Bert is "Bentz", a common short-form for the name "Ben-Tzion", and Ernie is "Arik", short-form for "Arie" (Hebrew: אריק ובנץ).
- Italy, Sesamo apriti, Bert is "Berto" and Ernie is "Ernesto". They are called "Ernesto e Berto".
- Mexico and all Latin America, Plaza Sésamo, Bert is "Beto", while Ernie is "Enrique". In addition, Ernie's cousin Ernestine is called "Enriqueta".
- Netherlands, Sesamstraat, they are "Bert en Ernie". Paul Haenen provided Bert's voice, and Wim T. Schippers provided Ernie's until Schippers' death in June 2026. After this, Haenen resigned saying that after fifty years, he couldn't be Bert "without his Ernie". As of late 2026, the Dutch television network is holding auditions for two new voices.
- Norway, Sesam Stasjon, Bert is "Bernt", while Ernie is "Erling". Usually, they're called "Bernt og Erling", respectively voiced by Harald Mæle and Magnus Nielsen.
- Pakistan, Khul Ja Sim Sim, Bert is "Bablu", while Ernie is "Annu". They are commonly called "Annu aur Bablu".
- Poland, Ulica Sezamkowa, Bert is "Hubert" and Ernie is "Emil". They are called "Hubert i Emil".
- Portugal, Rua Sésamo, Bert is "Becas" and Ernie is "Egas". They are called "Egas e Becas", in the opposite order.
- Russia, Ulitsa Sezam, Bert is Vlas and Ernie is Yenik. They are called Vlas i Yenik ("Влас и Еник")
- Spain, Barrio Sésamo, Bert is "Blas", and Ernie is "Epi". Also, they are always called "Epi y Blas", in the opposite order.
- Turkey, Susam Sokağı, Bert is "Büdü", while Ernie is "Edi". They are commonly called "Edi ile Büdü".
- Ukraine, "Берт та Ерни".

== In other media ==
=== Books ===
Bert and Ernie are the subject of numerous books including:

- 2021, Bert & Ernie, Random House ISBN 9780593308233
- 2019, The Importance of Being Ernie (and Bert), Imprint ISBN 9781250304568
- 2012, Bert and Ernie Go Camping, Candlewick Press ISBN 9780763657932
- 1992, Ernie And His Merry Monsters, Western Publishing ISBN 9780307295019
- 1990, Ernie and Bert's New Kitten, Random House ISBN 9780679804208
- 1987, Ernie's Neighborhood, Western Publishing ISBN 9780303231585
- 1987, Just like Ernie, Golden Books Publishing ISBN 9780307290083
- 1987, Little Ernie's Animal Friends, Random House ISBN 9780394885087
- 1984, The Adventures of Ernie & Bert in Twiddlebug Land, Random House ISBN 9780394859255
- 1983, Ernie's Little Lie, Random House ISBN 9780394854403
- 1981, Ernie's Big Mess, Random House ISBN 9780394848471
- 1984, Ernie's Work of Art, Western Publishing ISBN 9780307601094
- 1979, The Many Faces of Ernie, Western Publishing OCLC 6248054

=== Theme parks ===
Bert and Ernie were some of the first characters to appear at Sesame Place theme park as costumed characters, in May 1983. (They had previously appeared at the attraction's groundbreaking event.)

== See also ==
- Bert and Ernie's Great Adventures
- Bert is Evil
- Muppet Theory
