= Ahlan Simsim =

Arabic-language co-production of Sesame Street

- أهلا سمسم
- Original languages: Arabic, Kurdish
- No. of seasons: 7
- No. of episodes: 156

Production
- Producers: Sesame Workshop, International Rescue Committee
- Running time: 25-26 minutes
- Production company: Sesame Workshop

Original release
- Network: MBC3
- Release: 2 February 2020 – present

Ahlan Simsim (Arabic: أهلا سمسم, lit. 'Welcome Sesame') is an Arabic language co-production of Sesame Street that premiered on 2 February 2020, on MBC 3. The show is the spiritual successor to Iftah Ya Simsim, a Kuwaiti production that ran from 1979 to 1989, and aired in multiple Arabic-speaking countries. The show also shares a name and its characters with an initiative to provide education for displaced Syrian children.

== Production ==
The series was first announced in 2016. In 2017, the show received a $100 million grant from the MacArthur Foundation.

Outreach programs were first launched in 2018.

The first season debuted in February 2020. Season three premiered on February 28, 2021, and season four in fall 2021.

The series is funded by the MacArthur Foundation grant and by the LEGO Foundation. USAID also provided a grant of $20 million in July 2021 to fund the program. The series is produced in collaboration with Sesame Workshop and the International Rescue Committee. As of 2022, the managing director of Ahlan Simsim at Sesame Workshop is Rene Celaya. Syrian, Lebanese, Jordanian, and Iraqi children are the target audience, with a special focus on displaced Syrian children.

The show is produced in Amman, Jordan.

== Messaging ==
The first season is designed to teach "the emotional ABCs": how to identify and manage emotions. Emotions covered in the first season were anger, anxiety, compassion, fear, frustration, determination, jealousy, loneliness, and sadness. Emotion management strategies taught in the show include "Stop, Notice, Think", counting to five, breathing, making plans, and asking adults for help.

The second season, in addition to continuing emotional education, focused on helping children cope with the COVID-19 pandemic. The third season more broadly looks at "life challenges", social skills, and conflict resolution. The fourth season looked at perseverance, optimism, and hope. The fifth season focused on kindness to one's self and others.

== Characters ==
Human cast members include Salma (played by Mariam Amer), who helps Basma and Jad in the show's DIY segment, Hadi (played by Rami Delshad), who plays guitar, and Teta Noor, Hadi's mother. Both Hadi and Teta Noor teach the younger characters how to manage their emotions.

Solely animated characters include Abu'l Fihim (played by Jawad Al Shakarji), who lives on a mural in the neighborhood, birds Bulbul, Hasoon, and Reesheh, and a trio of Dabke dancers.

The series debuted with three original Muppet characters: Basma, Jad, and Ma'zooza. Basma (played by Hind Jaal) is a purple almost six-year-old monster who is enthusiastic about new things and love to perform. Jad (played by Nowar Mahayri) is a yellow almost six-year-old monster who loves art and is new to the neighborhood. Ma'zooza (played by Fatimah Amayreh) is a baby goat who loves circles and is taught lessons by Basma and Jad. Ma'zooza was created to show children that they can be leaders and teachers themselves.

For the fifth season in 2022, the program introduced Ameera, a green eight-year-old girl who loves science and uses a wheelchair and crutches due to a spinal cord injury. Ameera uses a boxy, more outdated wheelchair to reflect the fact that displaced children in the region are often unable to access new mobility aids.

The series also includes localized versions of Gargur (played by Natheer Khawaldeh), Kaaki, and Elmo from Iftah Ya Simsim.

Guests on the show have included Raya Abirached.

== Episodes ==
Episodes air primarily in Levantine Arabic and include Iraqi, Jordanian, Lebanese, and Syrian dialects. Modern Standard Arabic is used in some segments. Some episodes have been translated into Kurdish. The first half of each episode features Basma and Jad dealing with a problem or experience. The second half features songs, games, and celebrity guests. Season 2 introduced number and word of the day segments. Season 3 introduces a do-it-yourself segment.

As of 2022, the show has six seasons, with each having 26 episodes. Each episode runs about 25–26 minutes.

In 2020, Sesame Workshop released four short public service announcements, featuring the show's muppet characters, which focused on health and hygiene. The show also produced a half-hour special called "Ahlan Simsim: Friends Time", which was aimed toward supporting Middle Eastern families during the COVID-19 pandemic. That same year, Basma and Jad also appeared in "Elmo's World News", a special aired internationally that focused on the pandemic and coping skills for children.

== Reception and impact ==
According to the MacArthur Foundation, 5.2 million children (from Iraq, Jordan, Lebanon, and Syria) viewed seasons 1 and 2, and 12 million viewers in the wider MENA region had seen the show by the end of season 3's initial airing. In 2022, an estimated 23 million children saw the show.

One 2022 study reported that children who watched the show had increased emotional regulation and larger emotional vocabularies. Parents also reported that they learned new words or emotional regulation strategies from the show as well. A 2023 study found that Jordanian children who had been exposed to the show at school every day for three months showed improvements in identifying and regulating emotions.

== Awards ==
The program received the Teachers' Choice Award in November 2020 from the Chicago International Children's Film Festival.

In 2021, the program was nominated in the Kids: Factual & Entertainment category for the International Emmy Kids Awards, marking the time a Jordanian program had received a nomination for the award.

In 2022, Ahlan Simsim was nominated for Best Mixed-Media Series at the Kidscreen Awards.

== Outreach programs ==
Ahlan Simsim's outreach programs to provide education to displaced Syrian children were launched in late 2018 in collaboration with the International Rescue Committee. Programs and materials were created through collaboration with displaced families and communities from August to November 2018.

These programs include year-long preschool classes for displaced children, parenting sessions, and materials for care providers. In less stable regions, the IRC hosts informal play and learning sessions in community centers. The programs also involve direct services in which early childhood development facilitators meet directly with children and caregivers in their homes. As of 2022, the regional project director for the programs is Marianne Stone.

During the COVID-19 pandemic, the initiative focused more on sharing messaging through text messages.

The programs are independently evaluated by NYU Global TIES for Children. A June 2023 report from the group revealed that a combined in-person and remote 11-week program affected children'slanguage, numeracy, and social-emotional development on par with what we usually expect as effects of a full year of preschool". Evaluation of an audio-only program for caregivers of young children found it did not improve learning, but did decrease depressive symptoms in caregivers.
