= Joey Mazzarino =

American puppeteer (born 1968)

- Born: Joseph Mazzarino; June 4, 1968 (age 58); New York City, U.S.
- Other name: Joe Mazzarino
- Occupations: Puppeteer; actor; director; writer
- Years active: 1986–present
- Spouse: Kerry Butler (m. 1997)
- Children: 2 (adopted)

Joseph Mazzarino (/mæzəˈriːnoʊ/; born June 4, 1968) is an American puppeteer, actor, director and writer. He is best known for his roles on Sesame Street as Murray Monster, Stinky the Stinkweed, and other Muppets, and for being Head Writer and Director on Sesame Street, winning 22 Emmy Awards for his work.

== Career ==
Former Muppet performer Camille Bonora influenced Mazzarino when she taught an improvisation class at his university, and eventually introduced him to Jim Henson. Mazzarino later became the head writer for Sesame Street and also worked on The Adventures of Elmo in Grouchland, Muppets from Space, and Kermit's Swamp Years.

When Mazzarino auditioned for Sesame Street, he wrote a sketch called "Colambo" and soon found himself cast in the title role. Afterwards, he became a prominent member of the Sesame Street cast, performing Horatio the Elephant, Ingrid, Murray Monster, Papa Bear, Stinky the Stinkweed, and various characters until 2015, when he resigned after completing work on season 46, following changes to the show's format.

Mazzarino spent the next few years as a writer/producer on the Showtime original series Kidding starring Jim Carrey. He directed all 13 episodes of the Netflix series Julie's Greenroom starring Julie Andrews, where he also served as a writer. Mazzarino spent over 20 years on Sesame Street in multiple roles: Head Writer, Director, Lyricist and Muppet performer. He received 25 Emmy Awards for his work in multiple categories (Outstanding Original Song, Outstanding Writing, Outstanding Direction and Outstanding Performer in a Children's Series).

Mazzarino is currently a writer for the PBS puppet series Donkey Hodie and was also a writer for the animated series Nature Cat and Carl the Collector.

== Personal life ==
Mazzarino is married to actress Kerry Butler. They have two adopted daughters, one named Segi for whom he wrote the Sesame Street song "I Love My Hair". The Muppet who sang the song was also named Segi.

== Filmography ==
=== Film ===
- A Sesame Street Christmas Carol – Joe Marley, Joey Dickens
- CinderElmo – King Fred, Blue Mouse
- 123 Count with Me – Ingrid
- Elmo Says BOO! – Joey Monkey, Sir Count-A-Lot
- Elmo's Christmas Countdown – Papa Bear, Stan the Snowball
- The Wild Wild West - Narf
- Elmopalooza – Horatio the Elephant
- Ghost Town – Food Delivery Guy
- Big Bird's Birthday or Let Me Eat Cake – Additional Muppet Performer
- Kermit's Swamp Years – Goggles the Toad, Turtle No. 1
- Muppet Meeting Films – Gimley's Boss, Wesley, Franklin (2nd Time), Coffee Guy, Smerdley (2nd Time)
- Billy Bunny's Animal Songs – Frog, Gopher
- Sesame Street's 25th Birthday: A Musical Celebration! – Joey Monkey, Merry Monster
- Sesame Street Celebrates Around the World – MNN Logo Purple Monster
- Sesame Street Jam: A Musical Celebration – Joey Monkey, Merry Monster
- The Adventures of Elmo in Grouchland – Bug
- The Muppets Celebrate Jim Henson – Additional Muppets
- Demon Days Live - 2-D (Puppetry only, uncredited)

=== Television ===
- 30 Rock – puppeteer ("Apollo, Apollo")
- Aliens in the Family – Spit (voice)
- Big Bag – Chelli, Lyle the Sock
- Blue's Clues – Boogie Woogie, Roary ("Blue's Room" segments)
- Blue's Room – Boogie Woogie, Roary, Sprinkles (season 2)
- CityKids – Captain (Inside the Head)
- Dog City – Artie Springer
- Donkey Hodie – Game Show Gator
- Elmo's World – Big Foot, Brown Bunny (in "Elmo Has Two! Hands, Ears & Feet"), The Cheese, Papa Bear, Ingrid, Stinky the Stinkweed, Old McDonald, The Two Headed Monster (left-head)
- Eureeka's Castle – Fluffy
- Jack's Big Music Show – Spunky the Alien and Henry the Monster
- Journey to Ernie – The Mighty Joke Tree, Sammy (squirrel), Artist Walrus, Penguin (voice), Kittens 2 and 3
- Mo Willems: Don't Let the Pigeon Do Storytime! — The Pigeon
- Muppet Time – Icky No-No, Kirby, one of the Frog Scouts
- Nick Jr. – Flexy ("Little Big Room" segments), Tube, Smelly ("Play Along" segments)
- Nature Cat – Cruiser
- Panwapa – Bill the Bug
- The Planet Matzah Ball – Oogie
- Sesame Street – Murray Monster, Blögg ("Abby's Flying Fairy School" segments), Colambo, Horatio the Elephant, Ingrid, Joey Monkey, Merry Monster, Narf, Old MacDonald, Papa Bear, Stinky the Stinkweed, Two-Headed Monster (left head, 2001–16), The Fairy Godperson, Zostic ("Super Morphin Mega Monsters" segments), Redhead Caveman (Primitive segments)
- Sheep in the Big City – General Lee Outrageous, Buddy Somebody, Count D'Ten
- The Wubbulous World of Dr. Seuss – Elwood the Jester (in "The King's Beard"), Lester McBird (in "Lester Leaps In")
- Unbreakable Kimmy Schmidt - Pupazza

== Crew work ==
- Bear in the Big Blue House – Writer ("The Yard Sale")
- Carl the Collector – Writer
- Cyberchase - Writer ("Invasion of the Funky Flower")
- Elmo's Christmas Countdown – Writer
- Elmopalooza – Writer
- Julie's Greenroom – Director/Writer/Co-Producer
- Kermit's Swamp Years – Screenplay Co-Writer
- Muppets from Space – Screenplay Co-Writer
- Sesame Street – Writer/Director
- Sheep in the Big City – Writer
- The Adventures of Elmo in Grouchland – Screenplay Co-Writer
- The Upside Down Show – Writer
- Kidding – Writer

== Awards and nominations ==
- Writers Guild of America Award
  - 2009 WGA Award for Elmo's Christmas Countdown
- Daytime Emmy Award Nominations
  - 2000 Daytime Emmy Award Nominee for Outstanding Writing in a Children's Series (Sesame Street)
  - 2007 Daytime Emmy Award Nominee for Outstanding Writing in a Children's Series (Sesame Street)
  - 2008 Daytime Emmy Award Nominee for Outstanding Directing in a Children's Series (Sesame Street)
- Directors Guild of America Nominations
  - 2014 DGA Award Nominee for Directing for Children's Programs (Sesame Street, "4504 Numericon")
  - 2015 DGA Award Nominee for Directing for Children's Programs (Sesame Street, "The Cookie Thief")

Preceded by None	Performer of Papa Bear; 1992–2015	Succeeded by Martin P. Robinson
Preceded by Jerry Nelson	Performer of Two-Headed Monster (left head); 2001–16	Succeeded by Eric Jacobson
Preceded by None	Performer of Murray Monster; 2005–15	Succeeded by None
Preceded by None	Performer of Horatio the Elephant; 1994–2016	Succeeded by Peter Linz
