= Stephanie D'Abruzzo =

American actress and puppeteer (born 1971)

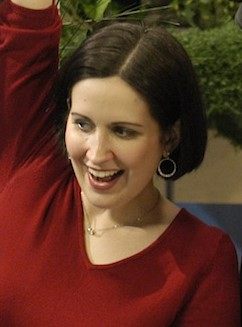
- D'Abruzzo on the set of Oobi in 2004
- Born: Stephanie Ann D'Abruzzo; December 7, 1971 (age 54); Pittsburgh, Pennsylvania, U.S.
- Education: Northwestern University
- Occupations: Actress; puppeteer
- Years active: 1990–present
- Known for: Sesame Street (since 1993); The Book of Pooh (2001–02); Avenue Q (2004)
- Spouse: Craig Shemin (m. 1995)

Stephanie Ann D'Abruzzo (/dəˈbruːzoʊ/; born December 7, 1971) is an American actress and puppeteer. She has performed various Muppets in the television program Sesame Street. She held starring roles on the children's TV shows Oobi and The Book of Pooh.

D'Abruzzo is also well known for playing Kate Monster and Lucy the Slut in the original Broadway production of Avenue Q in 2003. She received a nomination for the Tony Award for Best Leading Actress in a Musical for her performance.

== Early life ==
D'Abruzzo was born in Pittsburgh, Pennsylvania, on December 7, 1971, and grew up in McMurray, a Pittsburgh suburb she has described as a "plastic bubble kind of town." She graduated from Peters Township High School in 1989 and attended the Pennsylvania Governor's School for the Arts, a summer program for gifted high school students.

D'Abruzzo is a 1993 graduate of the Radio/Television/Film program at Northwestern University. At the university's Communications Residential College (CRC), she could often be caught watching (and, as it turns out, studying) Sesame Street. She had a large collection of Muppet recordings, which she compiled into a mixtape that she auctioned off for dorm fundraisers.

Eventually, D'Abruzzo began to consider puppetry as a career, in part as a solution to finding acting roles after she "gained more than the Freshman 15 and [got] a bad perm." D'Abruzzo's production of a puppet television show called Freeform won the National College Emmy award for comedy.

D'Abruzzo's other roles at Northwestern included Mildred in the short film The Ballad of Hank and Mildred and as herself in The Glance. While in college, she also performed with a campus improvisational comedy troupe.

== Career ==
D'Abruzzo has spent much of her career performing as a puppeteer in children's television, but she is known for originating the roles of single schoolteacher Kate Monster and sultry chanteuse Lucy the Slut in 2003 in the Broadway musical Avenue Q. She garnered acclaim for her performance of the dual role, including a nomination for the 2004 Tony Award for Best Actress in a Musical, a Drama Desk nomination, the Theatre World Award, and the 2003–04 Outer Critics Circle Special Ensemble Award.

Other stage credits include I Love You Because (Off-Broadway) (2006), If You Give A Mouse A Cookie (Off-Broadway, TheaterworksUSA, 2006), Carnival (for City Center Encores!, 2002), Kiss and Makeup (New York City Fringe Festival, 2007), and Austentatious (New York Musical Theatre Festival) in 2007.

D'Abruzzo has performed in developmental readings of Avenue Q, I Love You Because, Oh, What a Lovely War! (2005), The $trip, The Medium at Large, and The Green Room. She has also been featured in several concerts and benefits, including Skitch Henderson's New Faces of 2004 at Carnegie Hall, Encores! 10th Anniversary Bash, Chess (for the Actors' Fund, 2003), Children and Art: Stephen Sondheim's 75th Birthday Gala (2005), and Stephen Sondheim's 75th: The Concert (at the Hollywood Bowl, 2005).

D'Abruzzo appears on the original cast recordings of Avenue Q and I Love You Because and performs the parts of "Sheldon" and "Deb" on the studio recording of Finding Nemo – The Musical, a musical production performed several times each day at Disney's Animal Kingdom.

She is one of the performers included in the documentary ShowBusiness: The Road to Broadway (2007), which chronicles the 2003–04 Broadway season.

In May 2005, D'Abruzzo made her solo cabaret debut at the New York City jazz club Birdland.

=== Television ===
Since 1993, D'Abruzzo has performed as various Muppets in Sesame Street, including a notable performance singing with R.E.M. in a new version of their song "Shiny Happy People" called "Furry Happy Monsters". From 2000 to 2005, she appeared as Uma and Inka on the Noggin series Oobi. D'Abruzzo worked on Oobi along with her husband, Craig Shemin, who was part of the show's writing staff.

Her other puppeteering and voice work includes appearances in Sheep in the Big City, The Book of Pooh, The Wubbulous World of Dr. Seuss (1997), and Jack's Big Music Show, along with various commercials and promos. She guest starred in a musical episode of Scrubs titled "My Musical", as a patient with a mysterious ailment that caused her to interpret speech as Broadway-esque song and dance numbers. She sang in five of the nine songs. Four of the episode's songs were co-written by Avenue Q composers Robert Lopez and Jeff Marx. She later appeared in a cameo in episode "My Finale", as series protagonist J.D. leaves Sacred Heart for the final time.

D'Abruzzo performed Prairie Dawn on Sesame Street season 46, following the retirement of Prairie Dawn's original performer, Fran Brill, in 2015.

D’Abruzzo voiced Kimmy’s long-lost backpack, Jan S. Port, in Season 4, episode 6 of the Unbreakable Kimmy Schmidt ("Kimmy Meets an Old Friend"). She reprised her role in the show's interactive film.

== Personal life ==
She is married to Craig Shemin, a writer and producer and board member of the Jim Henson Legacy. They married on September 17, 1995, and live in New York City.

== Filmography ==
- The Varsity Cafe (TV, 1990) - Frieda
- Sesame Street (1993–present) - Prairie Dawn (Since 2016), Elizabeth, Mrs. Crustworthy (Since 2016), Lulu, Curly Bear, Googel, Additional Muppets
- The Puzzle Place (1995) - Jody Silver and Pink Piece Police (Season 2)
- The Wubbulous World of Dr. Seuss (TV, 1996) - Little Cat B, Annie DeLoo, Max the Dog, Jane Kangaroo, Pam-I-Am, Sue Snue, Sarah Hall-Small, Additional Muppets
- Elmo's World (1998) - Curly Bear, Elizabeth, Pillow, Diva D'Abruzzo, Additional Muppets
- The Adventures of Elmo in Grouchland (1999) - Grizzy, Pestie
- Sheep in the Big City - Plot Device, Lady Virginia Richington (series), Swanky the Poodle, Lisa Rental, Betsy
- Elmo's World: The Wild Wild West (2001) - Googel (Monster Clubhouse segment only)
- Scrubs (2001) - Patti (6.06, 8.19), AM Muppet (Ex Ray- 8.05)
- The Book of Pooh (TV, 2001–03) - Kessie
- Jack's Big Music Show (2005) - Gertrude the Groundhog, Scat Cat
- Bert and Ernie's Great Adventures (2006–13) Heidi, Clarice the Cow, Lady Lulu Quackerville, Lily, Bertina, Ostrich Lady
- Abby's Flying Fairy School (2009) - Super Fairy
- Cookie's Crumby Pictures (2013) - Iffy, M, Princess Parfaita, Sally
- Scooby-Doo! Adventures: The Mystery Map (2013) - Velma Dinkley and Shirley
- Unbreakable Kimmy Schmidt (2016–18) - Jan S. Port, Pupazza assistant puppeteer
- Unbreakable Kimmy Schmidt: Kimmy vs the Reverend (2020) - Jan S. Port
- Helpsters - Cody (2019–23)
- Oobi (2000–05) - Uma, Inka
- Julie's Greenroom (2017) - Peri
- The Not-Too-Late Show with Elmo (2020) - Mae, Prairie Dawn
- Donkey Hodie (TV, 2021–present) - Duck Duck, Harriett Elizabeth Cow
- Furry Friends Forever: Elmo Gets a Puppy (2021) - Mae
- The Muppet Show - Guest Starring Muppet Performer

== Awards and nominations ==
Year	Award	Category	Work	Result	Refs
2025	Children's and Family Emmy Awards	Outstanding Puppeteer Performance	Donkey Hodie	Nominated	
