= List of Stuyvesant High School people =

This article lists notable people associated with Stuyvesant High School in New York City, organized into rough professional areas and listed in order by their graduating class.

== Significant awards ==
Alumni who have won significant awards in their fields of endeavor include:

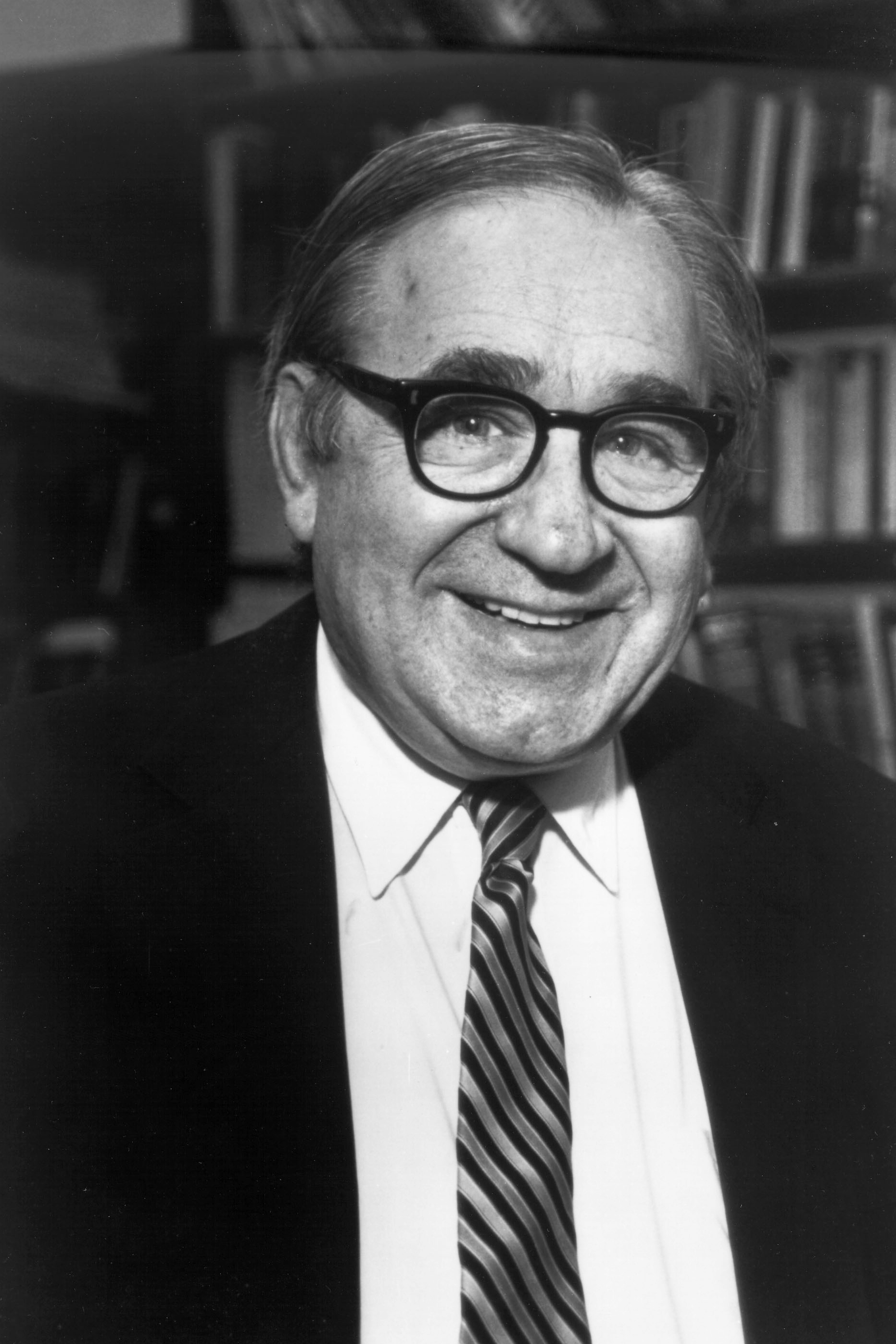
Robert Fogel

- James Cagney (1918) – 1942 Academy Award for Best Actor for Yankee Doodle Dandy
- Joseph L. Mankiewicz (1924) – 1949, 1950 Academy Award for Best Director for A Letter to Three Wives and All About Eve
- Joshua Lederberg (1941) – 1958 Nobel Prize in Physiology or Medicine
- Peter Lax (1943) – 1987 Wolf Prize in Mathematics, 2005 Abel Prize
- Robert Fogel (1944) – 1993 Nobel Memorial Prize in Economic Sciences
- Elias Stein (1949) – 1999 Wolf Prize in Mathematics
- Paul Cohen (1950) – 1966 Fields Medal
- Roald Hoffmann (1954) – 1981 Nobel Prize in Chemistry
- Richard Axel (1963) – 2004 Nobel Prize in Physiology or Medicine
- Tim Robbins (1976) – 2003 Academy Award for Best Supporting Actor for Mystic River
- Eric S. Lander (1974) – 2013 Breakthrough Prize in Life Sciences

== Mathematics ==
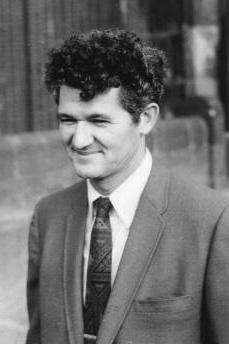
Peter Lax

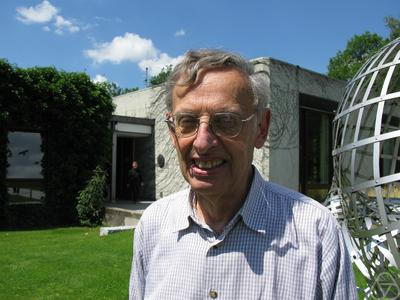
Elias Stein

- Peter Lax (1943) – fluid dynamics, differential equations; elected 1970 to the United States National Academy of Sciences, 1987 Wolf Prize, 1992 Steele Prize, 2005 Abel Prize (New York University, emeritus)
- Bertram Kostant (1945) – lie groups and representation theory; elected in 1978 to the United States National Academy of Sciences (Massachusetts Institute of Technology)
- D. J. Newman (1947) – analytic number theory, long-time editor of problems section in the American Mathematical Monthly (Temple University, emeritus)
- Harold Widom (1949) – integral equations, symplectic geometry (University of California, Santa Cruz), 2007 Wiener Prize
- Elias Stein (1949) – harmonic analysis; 1974 elected to United States National Academy of Sciences, 1993 Schock Prize, 1999 Wolf Prize, 2002 Steele Prize (Princeton University)
- Paul Cohen (1950) – logic, Banach algebras, 1964 Bôcher Prize, 1966 Fields Medal, elected 1967 to the United States National Academy of Sciences (Stanford University)
- Neil R. Grabois (1953) – commutative algebra (president, Colgate University)
- Jeff Rubens (1957) – probability and statistics, co-editor of The Bridge World (Pace University)
- Melvin Hochster (1960) – commutative algebra, algebraic geometry, invariant theory; 1980 Cole Prize, elected in 1992 to the United States National Academy of Sciences (University of Michigan)
- James Lepowsky (1961) – lie theory (Rutgers University)
- Peter Shalen (1962) – low-dimensional topology, Kleinian groups, hyperbolic geometry (University of Illinois at Chicago)
- Robert Zimmer (1964) – ergodic theory, dynamical cocycles (president of University of Chicago)
- Richard Arratia (1968) – probability, combinatorics (USC)
- David Harbater (1970) – algebraic geometry; NSF Postdoctoral Fellow, in 1994 Invited Lecturer to the International Congress of Mathematicians, 1995 Cole Prize (University of Pennsylvania)
- Paul Zeitz (1975) – ergodic theory (University of California, San Francisco)
- Jon Lee (1977) – mathematical optimization (G. Lawton and Louise G. Johnson Professor of Engineering, University of Michigan)
- Noam Elkies (1982) – elliptic curves; youngest person ever to win tenure at Harvard; his musical compositions have been performed by major symphony orchestras (Harvard University)
- Dana Randall (1984) – discrete mathematics, theoretical computer science (Georgia Tech)
- Elizabeth Wilmer (1987) – Markov chains (Oberlin College)
- Michael Hutchings (1989) – topology, geometry (University of California, Berkeley)
- Aleksandr Khazanov (1995) – Math Olympiad; Regeneron Science Talent Search Finalist; Curry Fellowship; skipped college and became a PhD student at Pennsylvania State University
- Michael Develin (1996) – combinatorics, geometry; American Institute of Mathematics Fellow (University of California, Berkeley)

== Physics ==
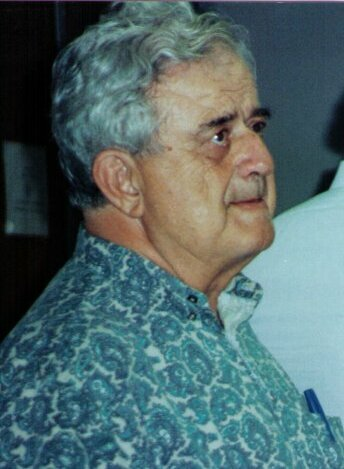
Marshall Rosenbluth

- Marshall Rosenbluth (1942) – theory of liquids, fusion; Fermi Award, United States National Academy of Sciences (University of California, San Diego, emeritus)
- Rolf Landauer (1943) – physics of computation; elected in 1988 to the United States National Academy of Sciences, IBM Fellow (Thomas J. Watson Research Center) (d. 1998)
- Paul Chaikin (1962) – condensed matter physics, elected to both the American Academy of Arts and Sciences (2003) and National Academy of Sciences (2004), Oliver Buckley Prize (2018), (New York University)
- Brian Greene (1980) – string theory, mirror symmetry, author of The Elegant Universe; Rhodes Scholar (Columbia University)
- Lisa Randall (1980) – high energy physics, Randall–Sundrum model, 2004 elected to the American Academy of Arts and Sciences (Harvard University)

== Chemistry ==
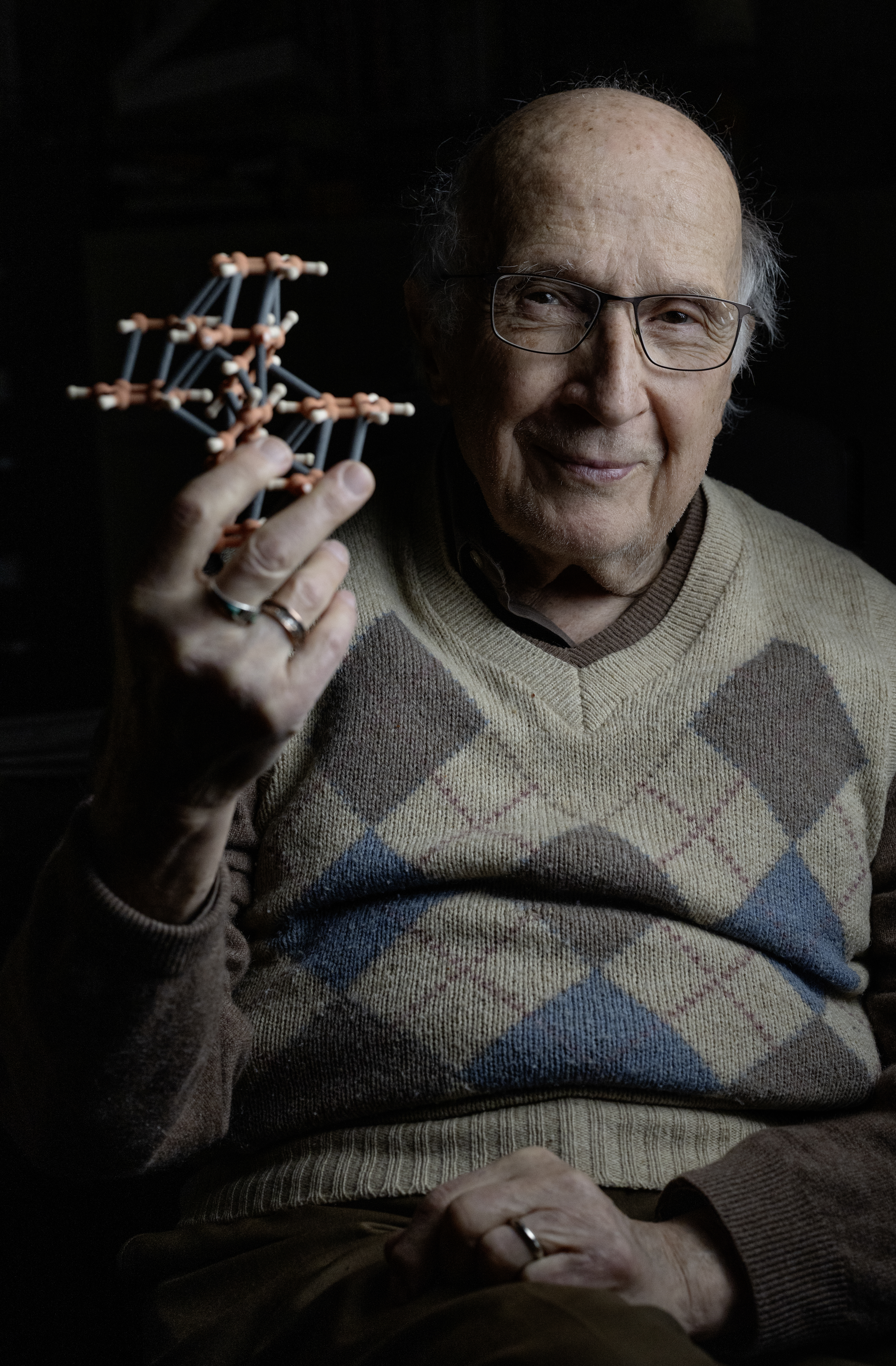
Roald Hoffmann

- Daniel Berg 1946 - physical chemist and Provost and Professor of Science and Technology at Rensselaer Polytechnic Institute
- Sheldon Datz (c. 1943) – 2000 Fermi Award
- Benjamin Widom (1945) – phase transitions, stat. mechanics, elected in 1974 to the United States National Academy of Sciences (Cornell University)
- Andrew Streitwieser, Jr. (1945) – organic chemistry, textbook author; elected in 1969 to the United States National Academy of Sciences, Sloan Fellow, Guggenheim Fellow (University of California, Berkeley)
- Edward Kosower (1945) – biophysics, 1996 Rothschild Prize in Chemistry (Tel Aviv University)
- Roald Hoffmann (1955) – geometric structure and reactivity of molecules, elected in 1972 to the United States National Academy of Sciences, 1973 Cope Award, 1981 Nobel Prize in Chemistry (Cornell University)

== Life sciences and medicine ==
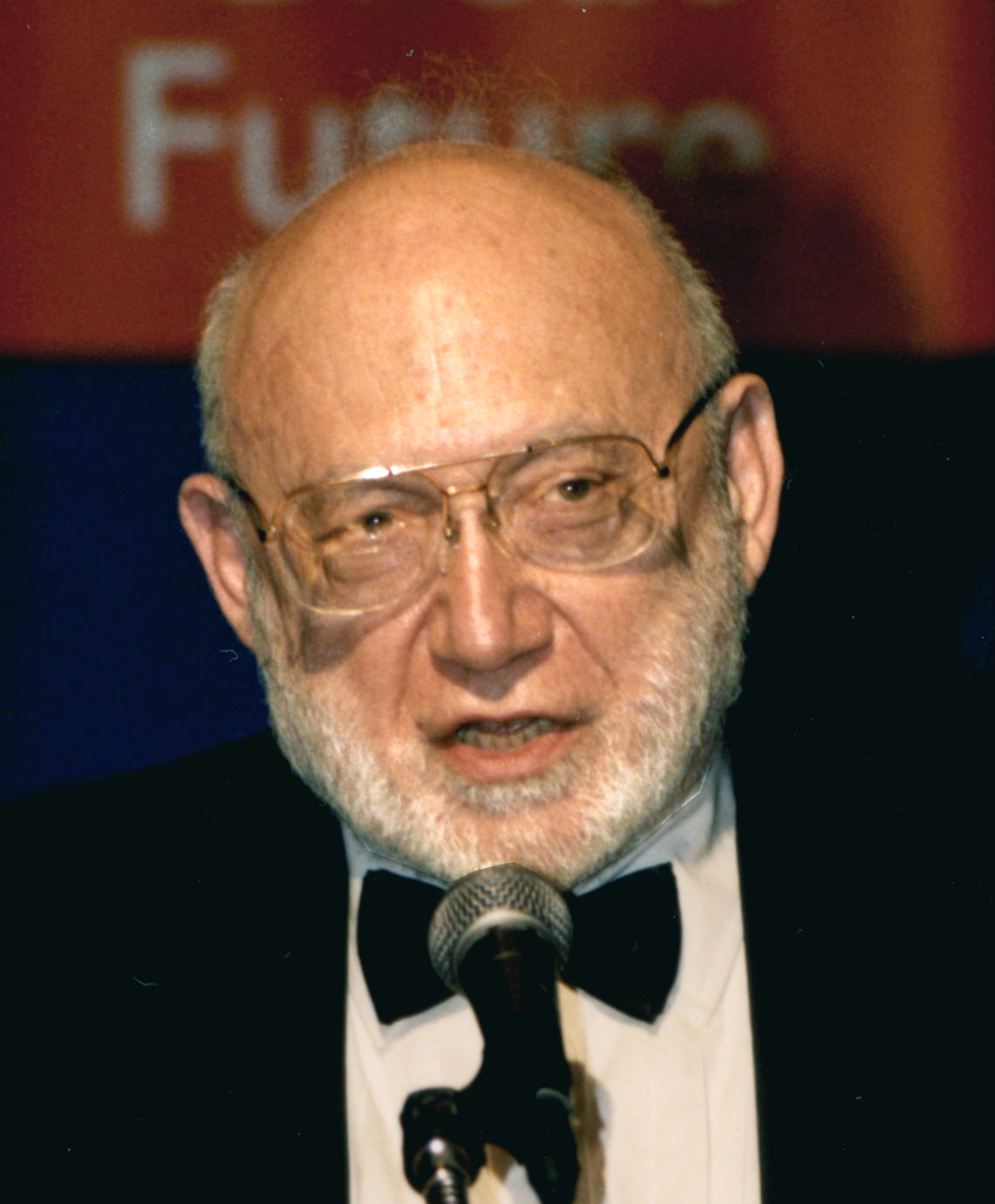
Joshua Lederberg

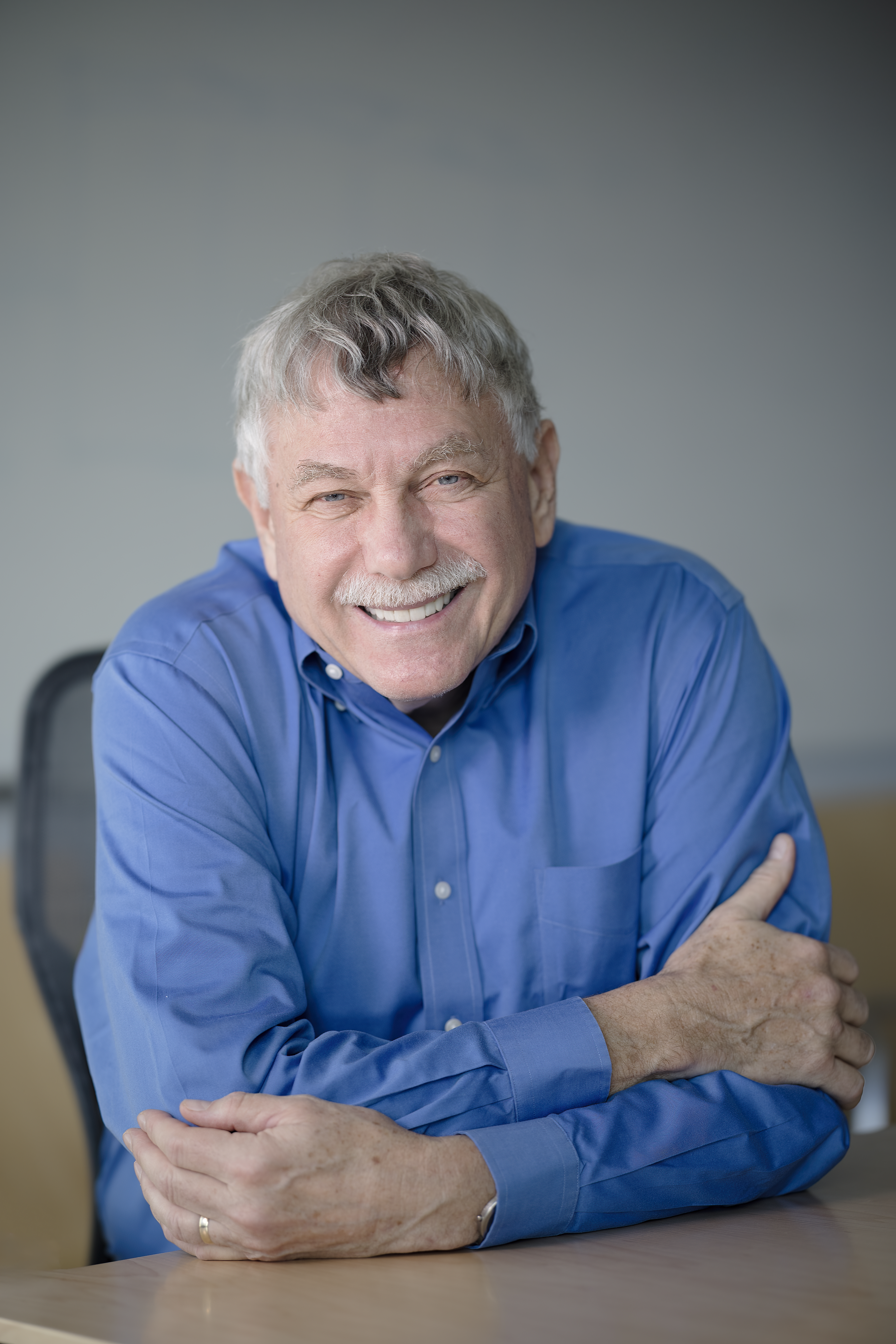
Eric Lander

- Hyman Biegeleisen (c. 1922) – physician and vein expert, pioneer of phlebology
- Philip H. Sechzer (1930) – anesthesiologist, pioneer in pain management; inventor of patient-controlled analgesia
- Joshua Lederberg (1940) – genetics; 1957 United States National Academy of Sciences, 1958 Nobel Prize in Physiology or Medicine, 1989 National Medal of Science, former president of Rockefeller University, 2006 Presidential Medal of Freedom
- Alvin Poussaint (1952) – clinical psychiatry (Judge Baker Children's Center, Harvard University)
- Robert Ira Lewy (1960) – hematology, Baylor College of Medicine; developed early application of aspirin in heart disease; donated to the creation of the Stuyvesant High School library in 2006, the Dr Robert Ira Lewy Multimedia Center
- Richard Axel (1963) – biochemistry, 2004 Nobel Prize
- Paul S. Appelbaum (1968) – psychiatrist and a leading expert on legal and ethical issues in medicine and psychiatry
- Robert Lustig (1973) – pediatric endocrinologist, professor at the University of California, San Francisco
- Eric Lander (1974) – computational biology; Westinghouse scholarship, Rhodes Scholar, MacArthur Fellow, co-director of Human Genome Project, 1997 United States National Academy of Sciences (Massachusetts Institute of Technology)
- Lee Dugatkin (1980) – evolutionary biologist, animal behaviorist and historian of science; author of How to Tame a Fox and Build a Dog
- Oni Blackstock (1995) – primary care and HIV physician and researcher
- Uché Blackstock (1995) – emergency physician and equity advocate

== Social sciences ==
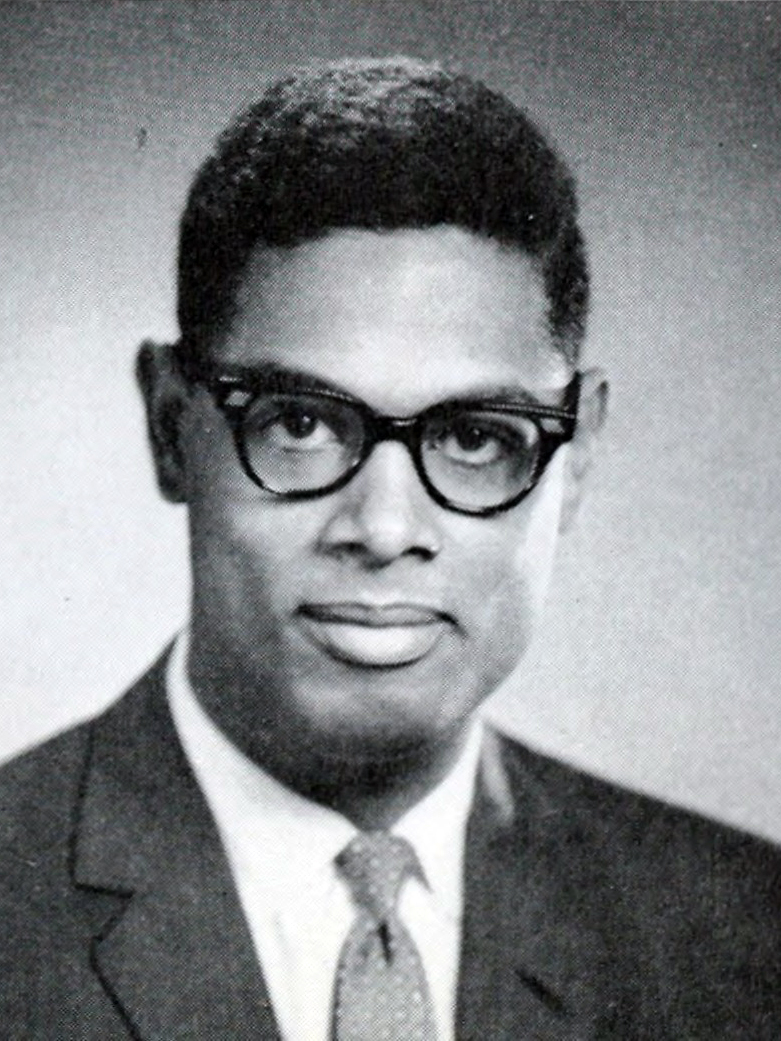
Thomas Sowell

- Lewis Mumford (1912) – historian of technology and science
- Igor Ansoff (1937) – business theorist, coined term "strategic management"
- Tobias Schneebaum (1939) – anthropologist, artist, and activist
- Robert Fogel (1944) – economist, winner of 1993 Nobel Memorial Prize in economics
- Samuel P. Huntington (c. 1945) – political theorist, author
- Bruce Bueno De Mesquita (c. 1963) – political scientist and professor at New York University
- Thomas Sowell (1947) – economist
- Edward Von der Porten (1951) – early nautical archaeologist, expert in early Chinese export porcelains
- Gerald M. Pomper (c. 1951) – expert on American politics and elections at Rutgers University
- John F. Banzhaf III (c. 1955) – professor and practitioner of public interest law at George Washington University
- Michael Levin (1960) – philosopher, author of Why Race Matters

== Technology ==
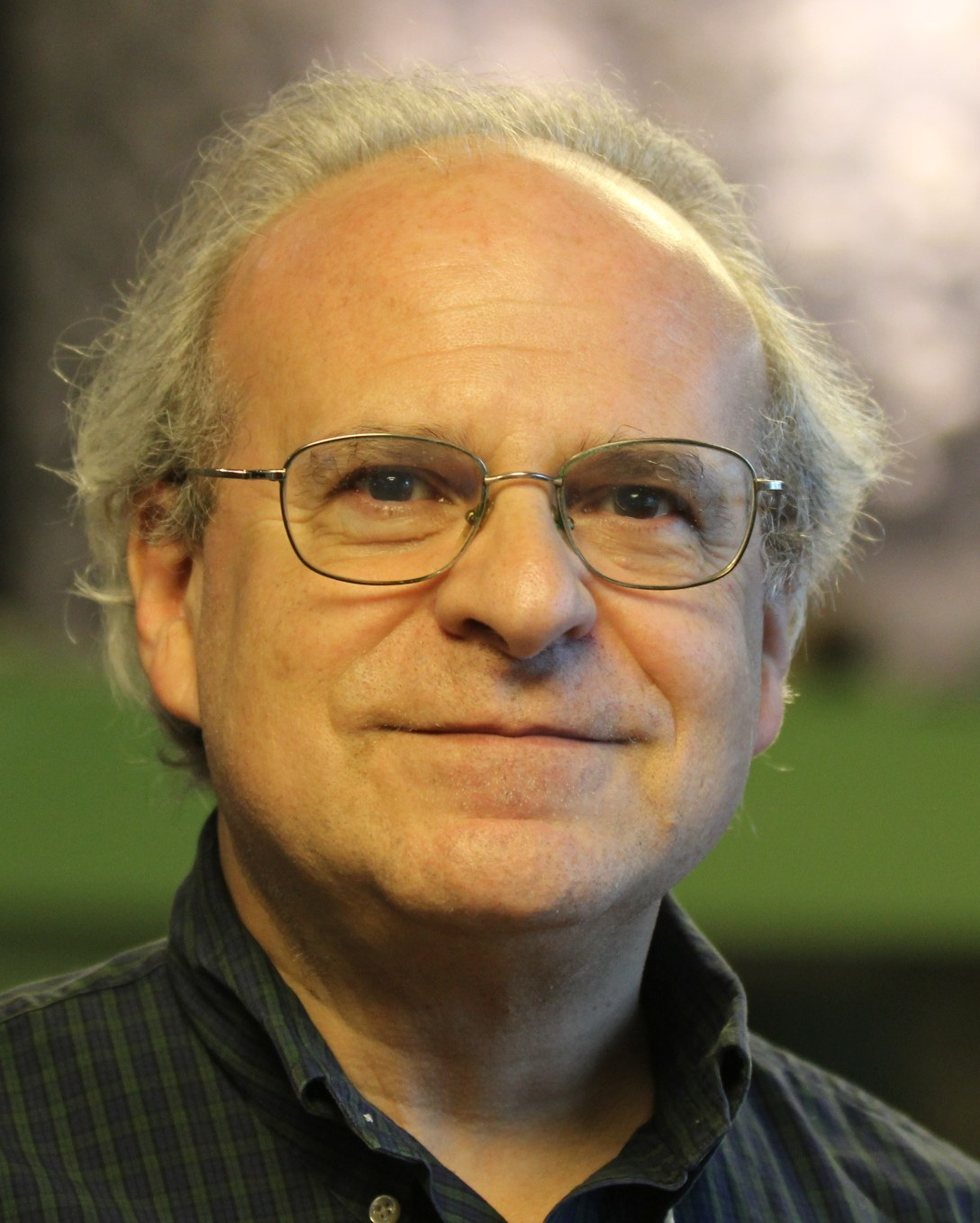
Bob Frankston

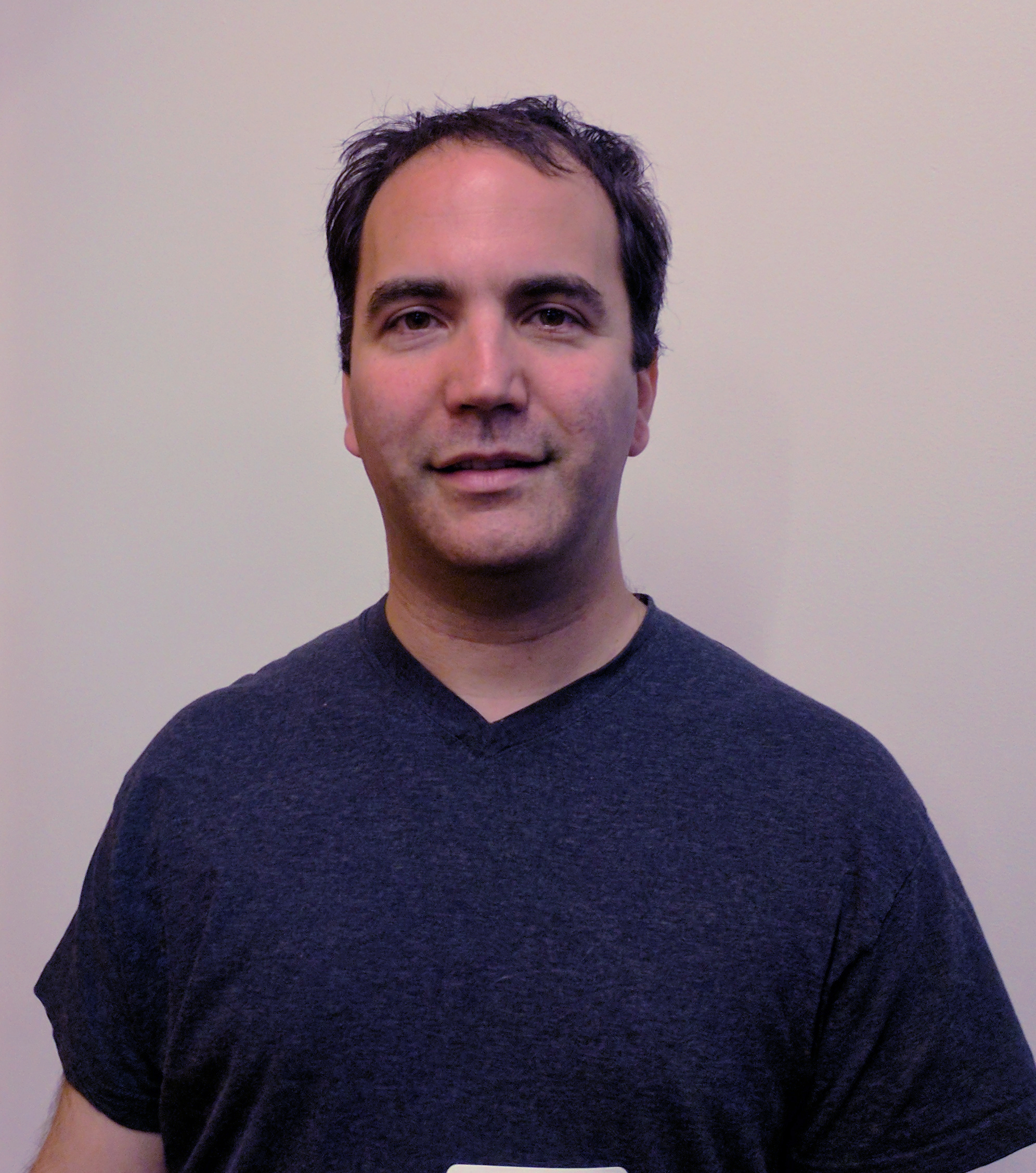
Bram Cohen

- Philip Birnbaum – architect notable for designing numerous apartment towers in New York City; designed or contributed to the design of approximately 300 buildings
- Hans Mark (1947) – aerospace engineering; served as Deputy Administrator of NASA, and Secretary of the United States Air Force
- Ronald J. Grabe (1962) – astronaut (NASA)
- Richard Lary (1965) – computer architecture; co-designer of VAX architecture (DEC)
- Bob Frankston (1966) – software; author of the spreadsheet VisiCalc
- Daniel Hirschberg (1967) – design of algorithms (University of California, Irvine)
- Steven M. Bellovin (1968) – leading authority on firewalls and Internet security; elected to National Academy of Engineering in 2001 (Columbia University)
- Henk Rogers (1972) – entrepreneur and video game designer, creator of Blue Planet Software and The Tetris Company, best known for Tetris
- Omar Wasow (1988) – creator of BlackPlanet, Oprah's "tech guy", MSNBC Internet analyst
- Naval Ravikant (1991) – entrepreneur, investor; co-founder and former CEO of AngelList
- Bram Cohen (1993) – author of BitTorrent
- Vishal Garg (1995) – founder of Better.com

== Writers ==
=== Staff ===
- Frank McCourt – memoirist and author; teacher of English and creative writing from 1972 until the late 1980s

=== Alumni ===
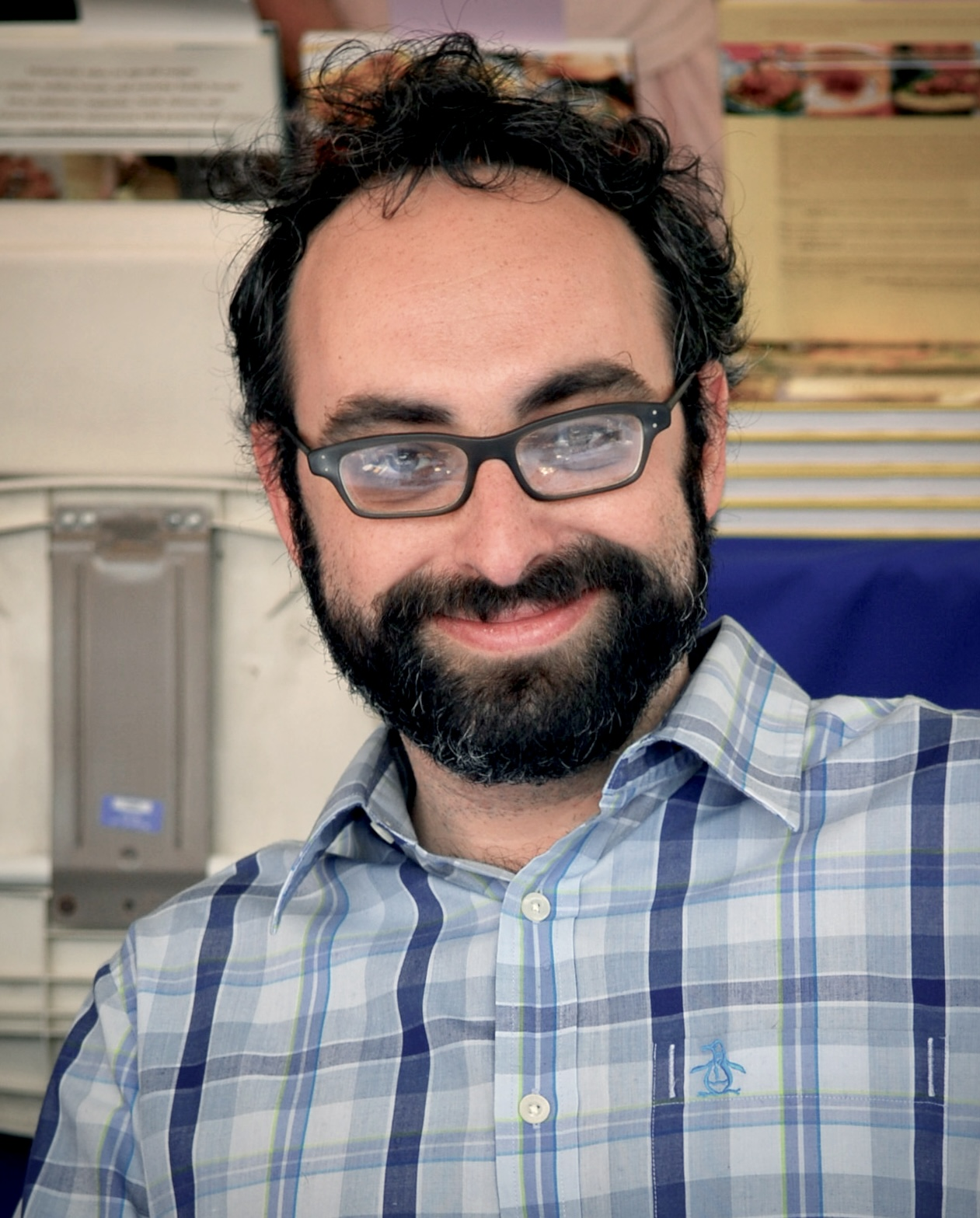
Gary Shteyngart

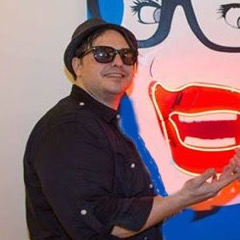
Daniel Genis

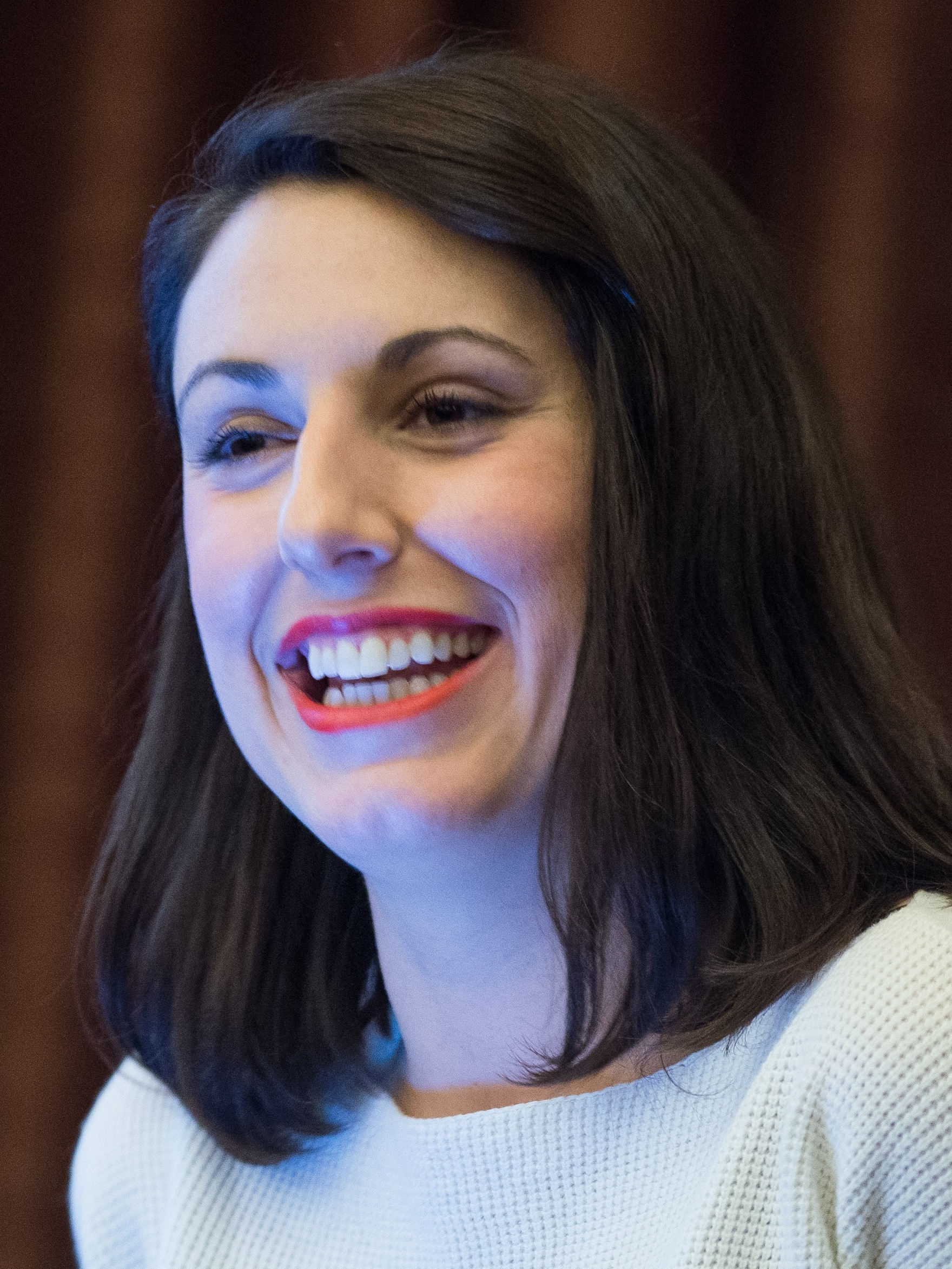
Jessica Valenti

- Samuel Spewack (c. 1917) – screenwriter, playwright, and double Tony Award-winner for Kiss Me, Kate and Academy Award nominee for My Favorite Wife
- Louis Zukofsky (c. 1918–1920) – poet
- Henry Roth (c. 1920) – author of Call It Sleep
- Nick Meglin (1953) – longtime MAD Magazine editor, and playwright
- Andrew Kaplan (1958) – writer, author of Hour of the Assassins, Scorpion, Dragonfire, War of the Raven
- Marv Goldberg (1960) – music critic and writer
- Alexander Rosenberg (1963) – novelist and non-fiction writer
- Eric Van Lustbader (1964) – writer, author of The Bourne Legacy and The Ninja
- David Lehman (1966) – writer, editor, critic, and professor of creative writing; series editor of The Best American Poetry; author of The Morning Line, Sinatra's Century, When a Woman Loves a Man, and Signs of the Times
- Hans Mark (1929–2021), (1947) U.S. Secretary of the Air Force, Chancellor of the UT System; physicist; engineer; Dean of Engineering, UT Austin
- M. G. Sheftall (1980) – writer, author of Blossoms in the Wind: Human Legacies of the Kamikaze
- David Lipsky (1983) – novelist (Absolutely American)
- Matt Ruff (1983) – writer (Set This House in Order)
- Laurie Gwen Shapiro (1984) – author (The Stowaway) and documentary director
- Jordan Sonnenblick (1987) – writer of young adult novels Drums, Girls, & Dangerous Pie, Notes from the Midnight Driver, Zen and the Art of Faking It, and Dodger and Me; student of Frank McCourt
- Arthur M. Jolly (1987)' – Nicholl Fellowship in Screenwriting, playwright of Past Curfew and A Gulag Mouse; student of Frank McCourt
- Alissa Quart (1989) – critic, journalist, poet, and editor; author of Republic of Outsiders: The Power of Amateurs, Dreamers and Rebels, Hothouse Kids: The Dilemma of the Gifted Child, Branded: The Buying and Selling of Teenagers, and Monetized
- Gary Shteyngart (1991) – author of The Russian Debutante's Handbook and Absurdistan
- Rebecca Pawel (1995) – writer
- Daniel Genis (1996) – writer, journalist, and ex-convict; columnist at Vice; author of The Last Beat: 1046 Books Behind the Wall
- Jessica Valenti (1996) – writer, online journalist, blogger, columnist and staff writer at The Guardian
- Ned Vizzini (1999) – writer

== Music ==
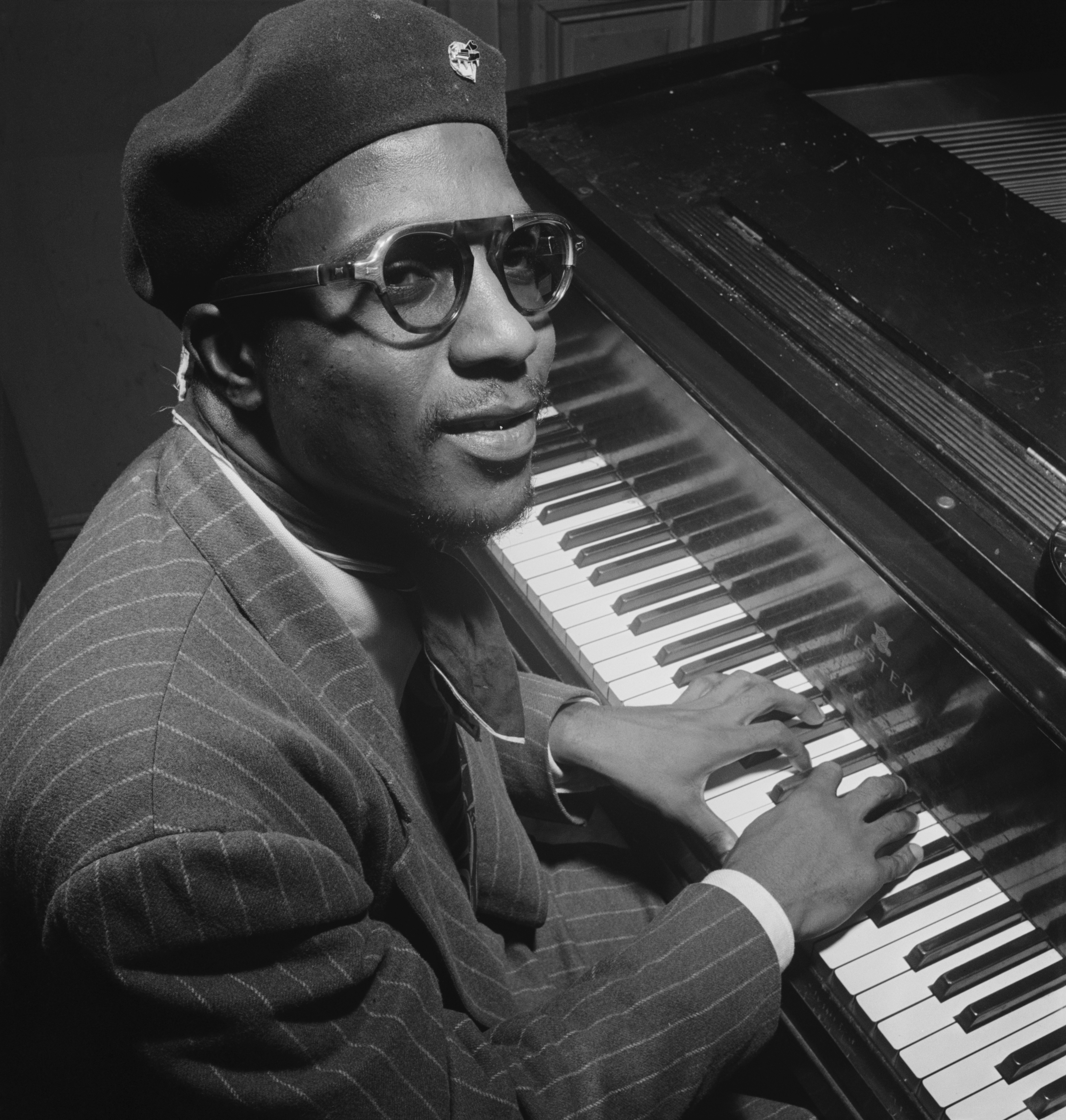
Thelonious Monk

- Rudy Schrager (1918) – composer and conductor for radio, television, and film
- Kai Winding (1935) – jazz trombonist and composer
- Thelonious Monk (1936) – jazz pianist and composer
- Julius Hegyi (1941) – conductor and violinist
- Tom Dowd (1942) – pioneer recording engineer, 1992 Grammy Award
- Bobby Colomby (1962) – drummer and record producer
- Walter Becker (1967) – co-founder of Steely Dan
- Richard Lloyd (1969) – guitarist for punk band Television and Matthew Sweet
- Kate Schellenbach (1983) – musician with the Beastie Boys and Luscious Jackson
- Heems (2003) – rapper, member of Das Racist and Swet Shop Boys
- Alex Weiser (2006) – composer, finalist for the 2020 Pulitzer Prize for Music

== Film ==
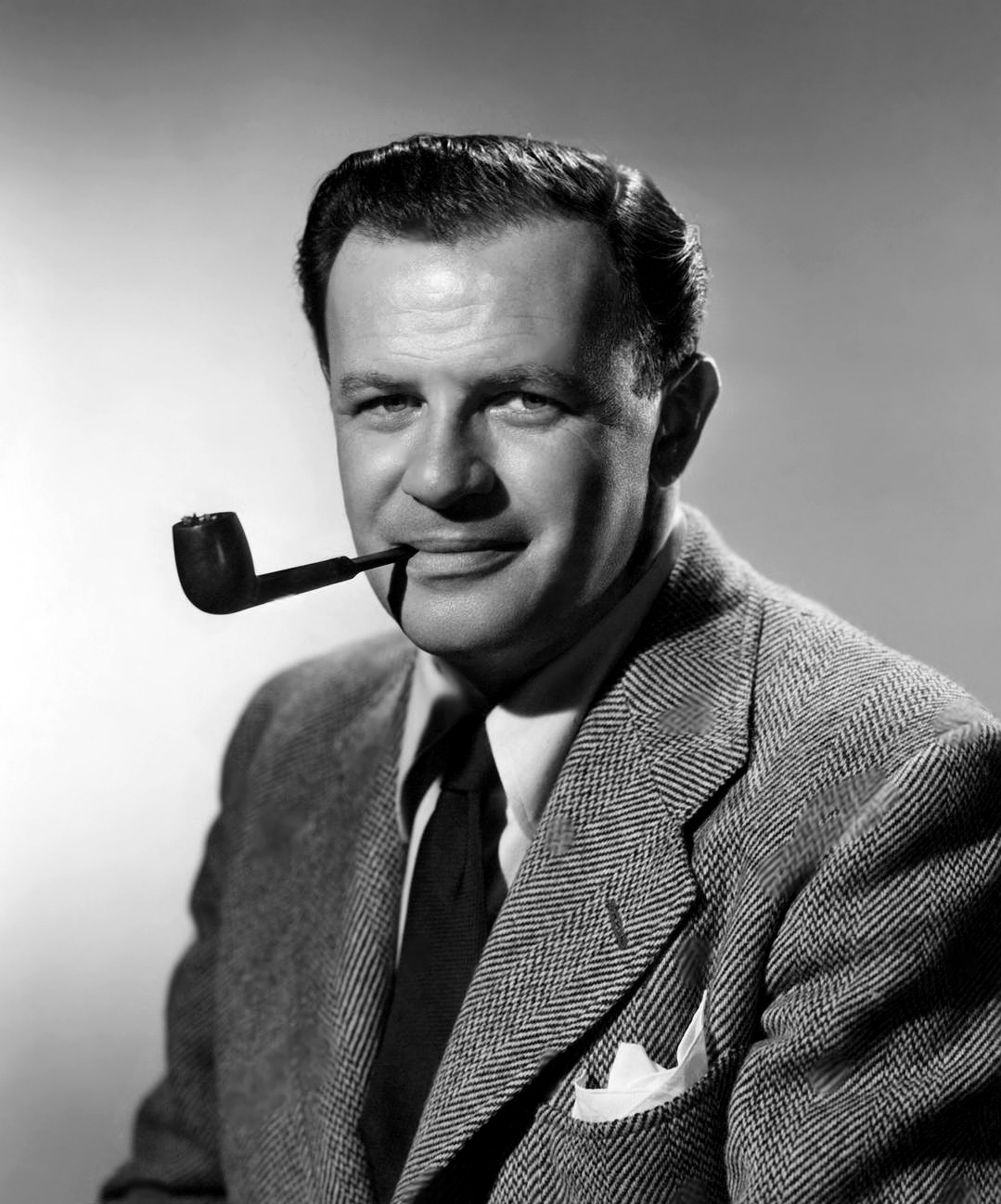
Joseph L. Mankiewicz

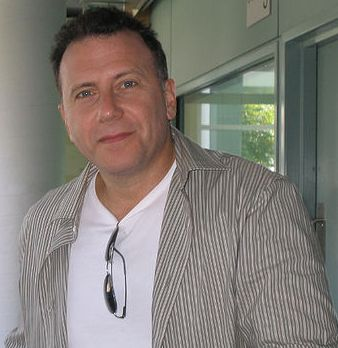
Paul Reiser

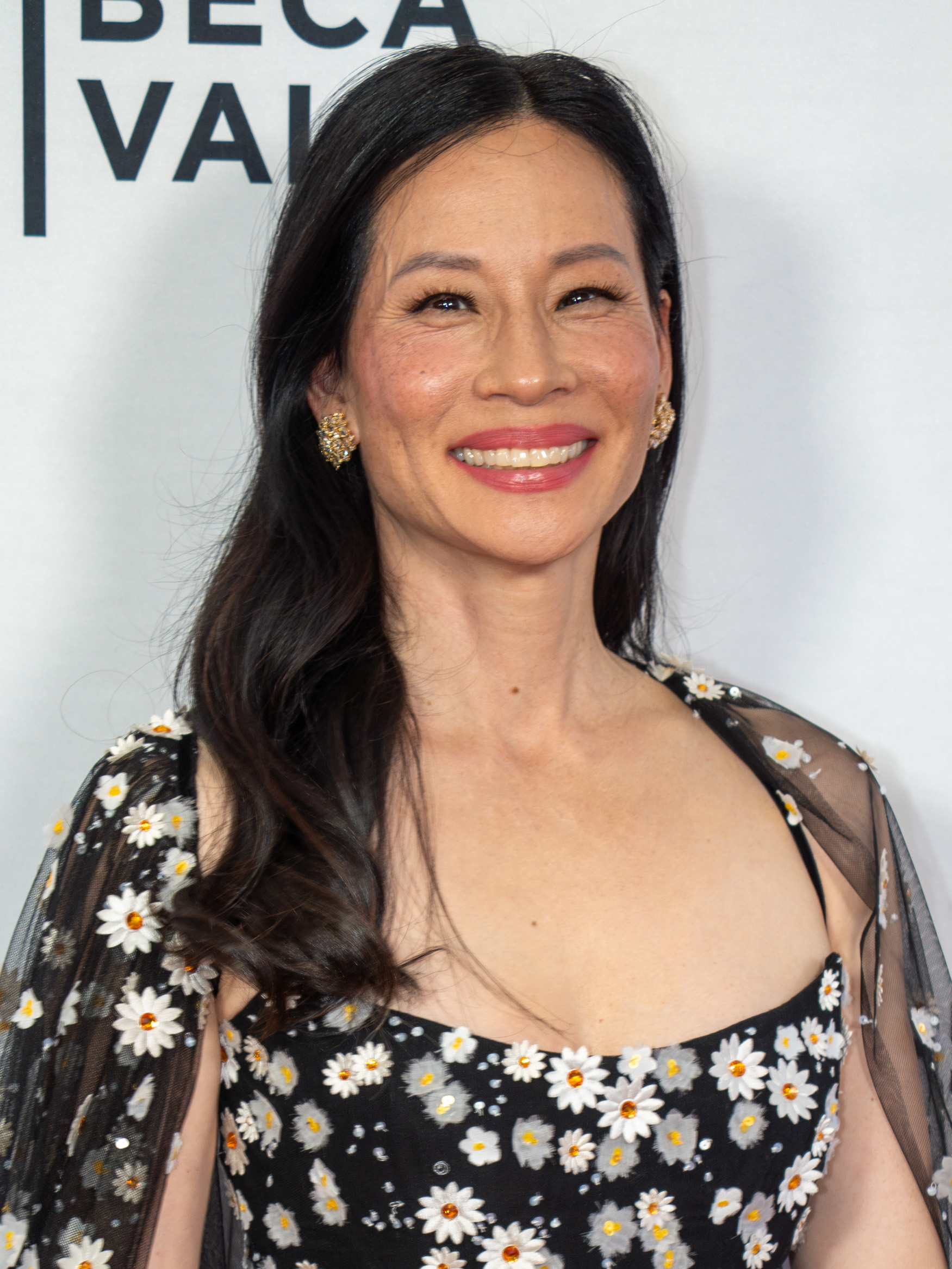
Lucy Liu

- James Cagney (1918) – actor, dancer, won Academy Award for Yankee Doodle Dandy
- J. Edward Bromberg (c. 1920) – actor
- Joseph L. Mankiewicz (1924) – four-time Academy Award winning producer
- Sheldon Leonard (1925) – Emmy-winning actor, producer, and director
- Robert Alda (1930) – Tony-winning stage and film actor, producer
- William Greaves (1944) – Emmy-winning filmmaker
- Ben Gazzara (1946) – Emmy Award-winning actor
- Simon Kornblit (1951) – former executive vice president of worldwide marketing for Universal Pictures; actor
- Ron Silver (1963) – actor, director
- Martin Brest (1969) – director, screenwriter, and producer
- Paul Reiser (1973) – actor and producer
- Tim Robbins (1976) – actor, screenwriter, director, producer; won Academy Award for Mystic River
- Lucy Liu (1986) – actress
- James Bohanek (1987) – Broadway and television actor
- Heather Juergensen (1987) – actress and writer (Kissing Jessica Stein)
- Lucy Deakins (1988) – attorney and former actress best known for starring as Milly in The Boy Who Could Fly and originating the role of Lily Walsh on As the World Turns
- Louis Ozawa Changchien (1993) – actor
- Angela Goethals (1995) – former actress, narrator and all around dramatist
- Billy Eichner (1996) – actor and comedian (Billy on the Street, Difficult People, Parks and Recreation)
- Kelly Karbacz (1996) – actress (Rent, Sesame English, Regular Joe)
- Malcolm Barrett (1998) – actor (Better off Ted, The Hurt Locker, Dear White People, and Timeless)
- Telly Leung (1998) – Broadway and television actor
- Emily Carmichael (2000) – director, screenwriter, and animator
- Wolé Parks (2000) – actor (As the World Turns, Premium Rush, The Vampire Diaries, Superman & Lois)
- Jeff Orlowski (2002) – Emmy-winning director and cinematographer (Chasing Ice)
- Jonah Meyerson (2009) – actor (The Royal Tenenbaums, The Matador)

== Journalism, radio, and television ==
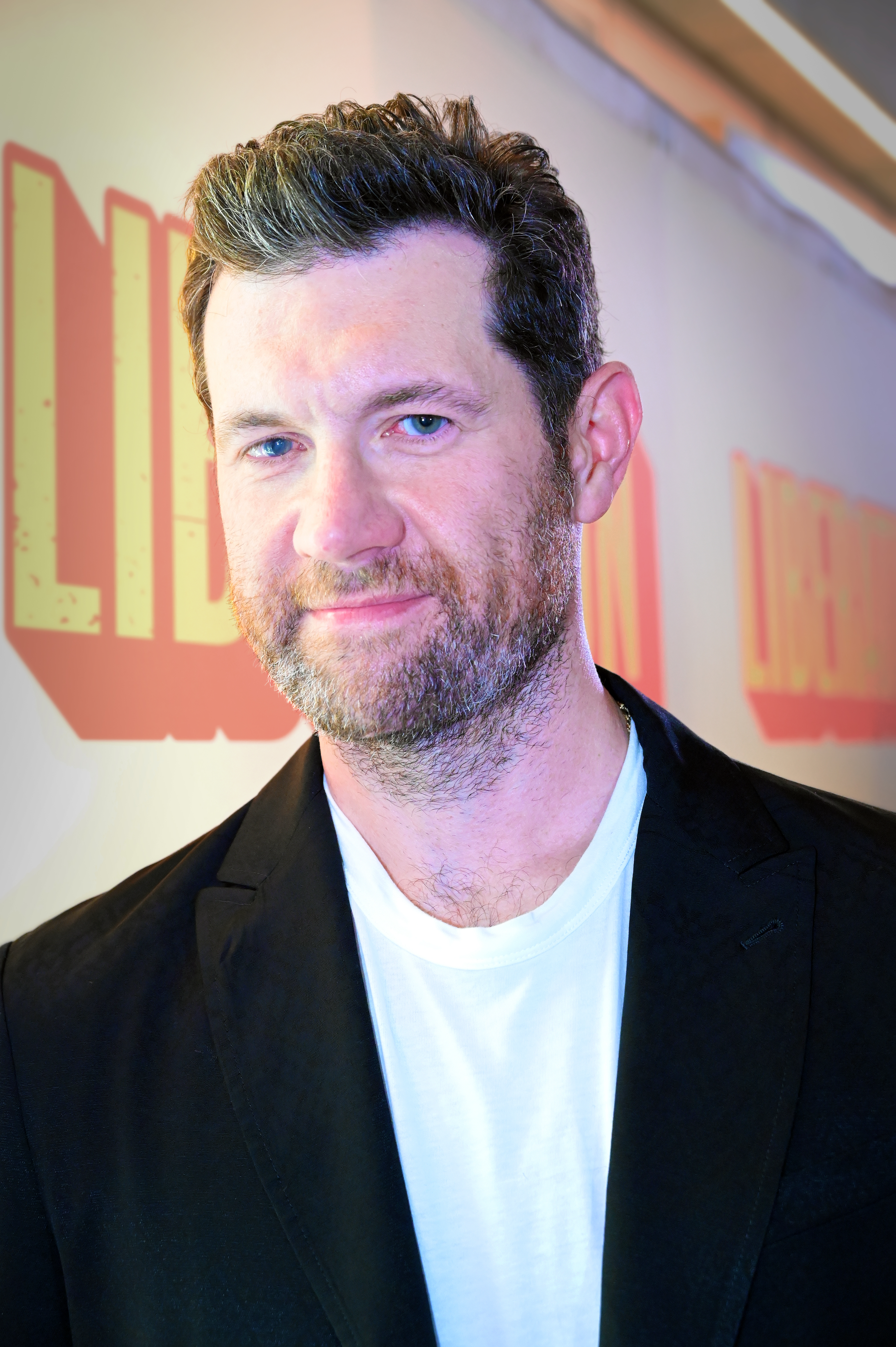
Billy Eichner

- Julius Edelman (1941) – photojournalist, especially his jazz photos, known as Skippy Adelman
- Jan Merlin (Wasylewski) (1942) – film, television, and Broadway actor; Emmy Award (1975)
- Vladimir Posner (1948) – self-proclaimed independent journalist, author, Soviet propaganda and television personality; hosts his own show on Channel One, a state-owned TV network in Russia
- Bernie Brillstein (1948) – producer and manager, Emmy winner
- Barry Schweid (1949) – longtime politics and international affairs reporter for the Associated Press
- Robert Siegel (1964) – radio journalist, All Things Considered
- Len Berman (1964) – Emmy Award-winning NBC sportscaster
- Sam Rosen (1965) – NHL announcer and play-by-play announcer for the NHL team, New York Rangers
- Sam Marchiano (1985) – MLB.com sportcaster and host; daughter of longtime sports news anchor, Sal Marchiano
- Mike Greenberg (1985) – ESPN sportscaster; co-host of the Mike and Mike show on ESPN Radio
- Hanna Rosin (1987) – journalist
- Jon Caramanica (1993) – pop music critic for The New York Times
- Billy Eichner (1996) – Emmy-nominated host of Billy on the Street, actor
- Harry Siegel (1996) – author, political consultant and journalist
- Jessica Valenti (1996) – feminist blogger and writer
- Reihan Salam (1997) – conservative writer at The Atlantic and Forbes.com, and blogger for The American Scene
- Adriana Diaz (2002) – 2006 Miss New York USA
- Ashok Kondabolu (2003) – co-creator and host of Chillin Island on HBO

== Educators ==
- Albert Shanker (1946) – served as president of the United and American Federations of Teachers; 1998 Presidential Medal of Freedom
- John Tietjen (1946) – served as president of Concordia Seminary and Christ Seminary-Seminex
- Gene Andrew Jarrett (1993) – dean of the faculty and William S. Tod Professor of English, Princeton University

== Business ==
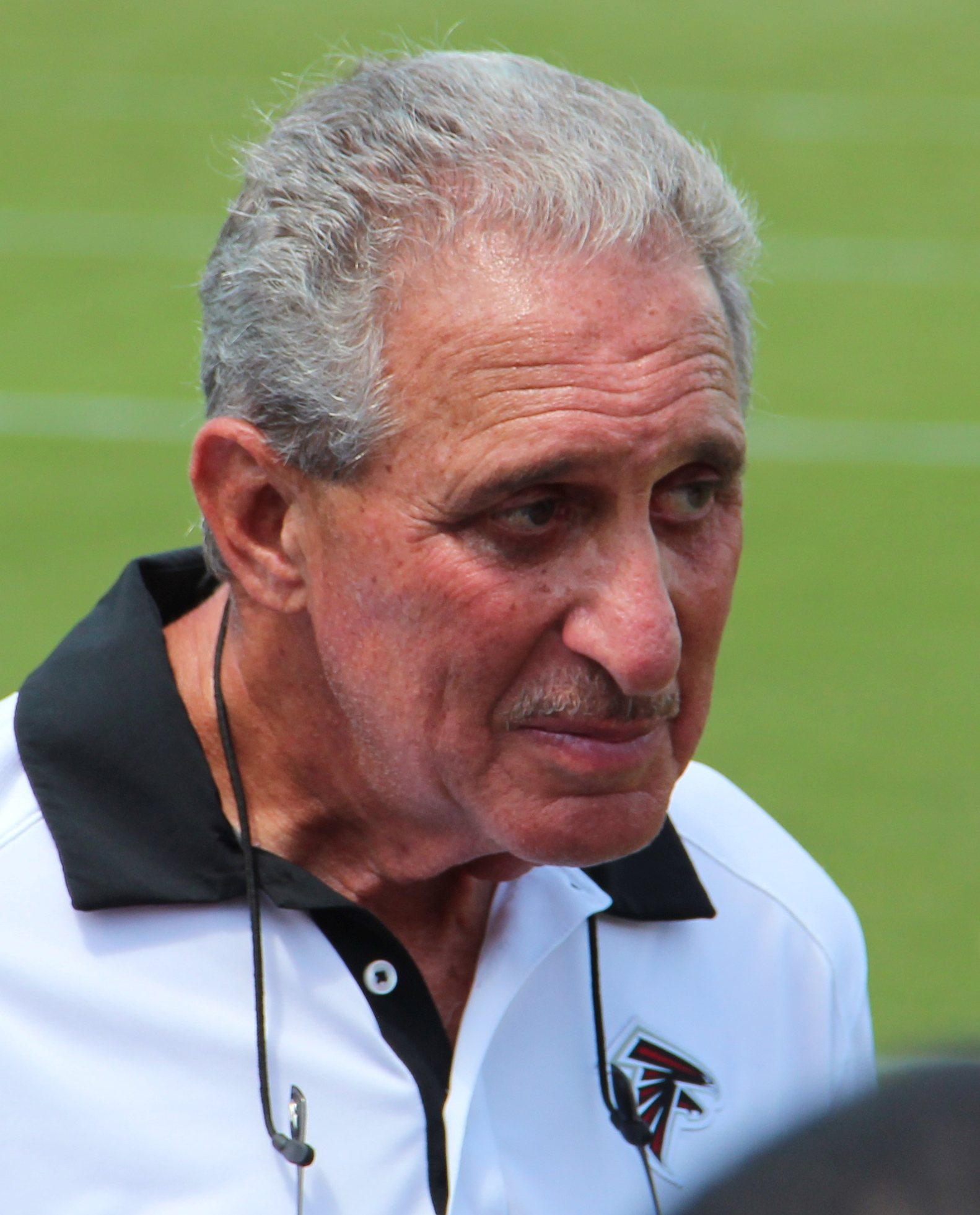
Arthur Blank

- Jack Nash (1946) – chairman of Oppenheimer & Company
- Saul Katz (1956) – president of the New York Mets
- Jeffrey Loria (1957) – former owner of Florida Marlins; former owner of Montreal Expos
- Arthur Blank (1960) – founder of The Home Depot; owner of the Atlanta Falcons
- Paul Levitz (1973) – president of DC Comics
- Drew Nieporent (1973) – restaurateur
- David Coleman (1987) – CEO of the College Board
- Boaz Weinstein (1991) – hedge fund manager
- Ronn Torossian (1992) – CEO of 5W Public relations
- Amol Sarva (1994) – on founding team of Virgin Mobile; founder of Wireless Founders Coalition for Innovation; founder and CEO of Peek

== Politics ==
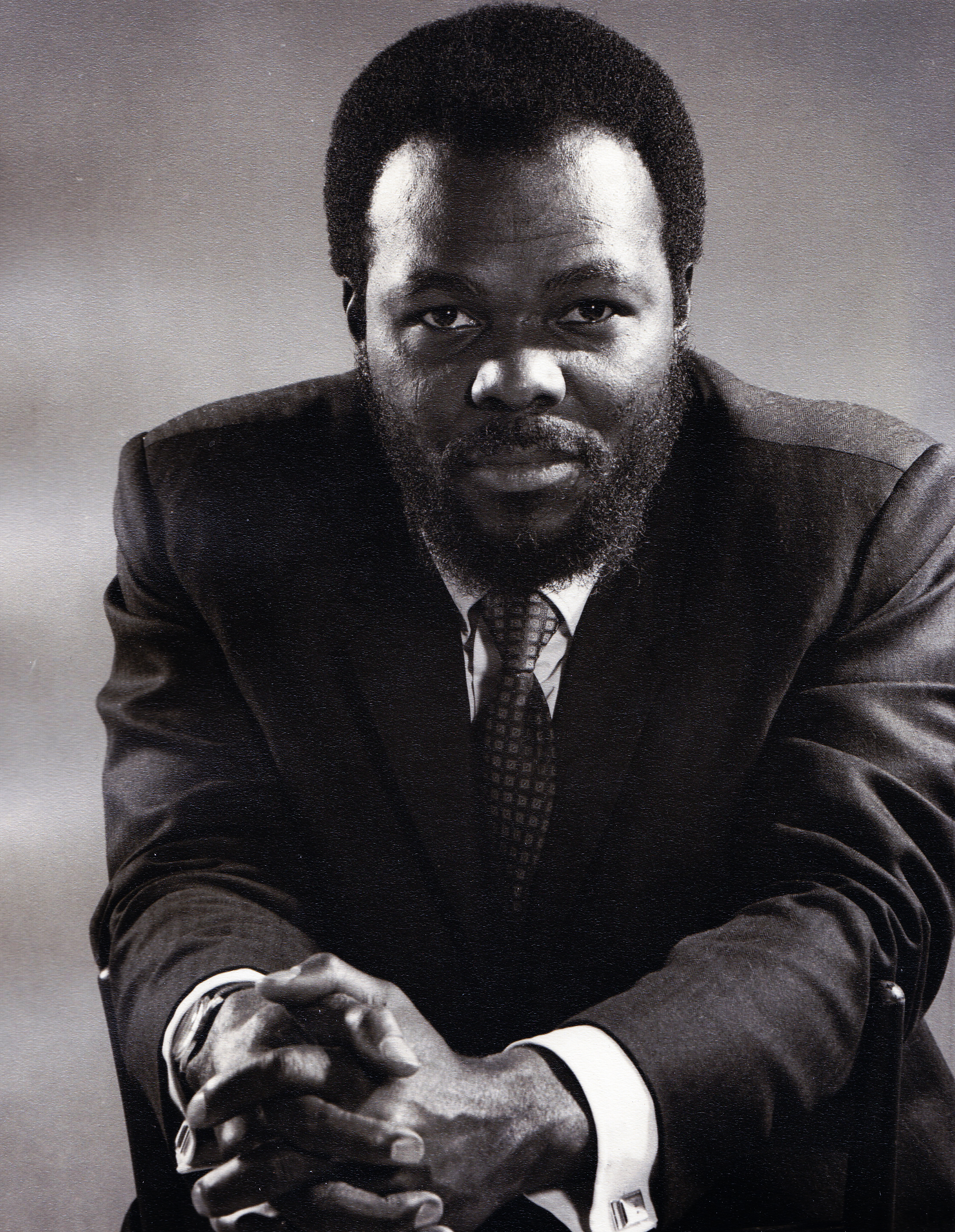
Roy Innis

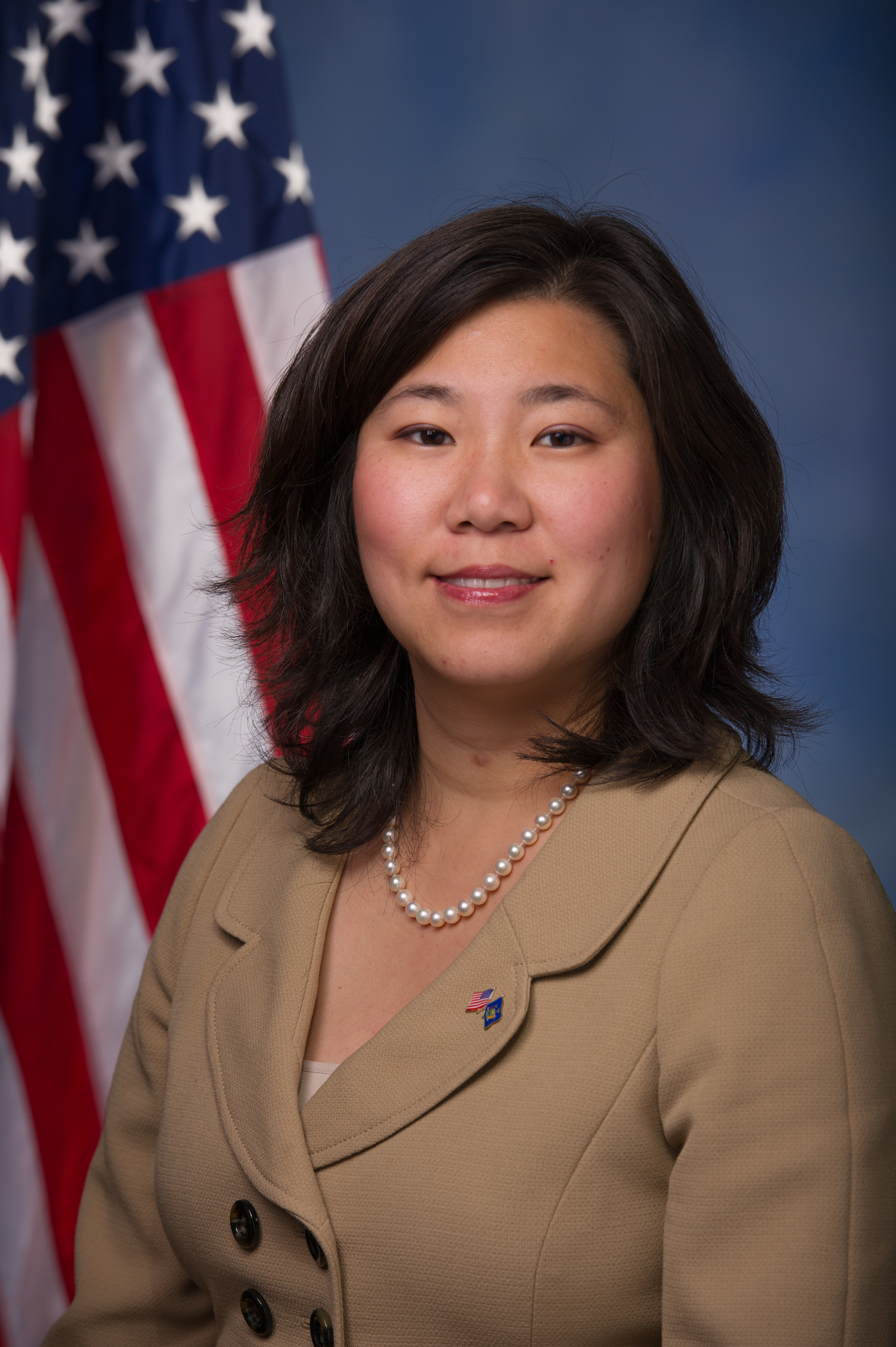
Grace Meng

- Herbert Zelenko (1922) – U.S. Congressman
- Moe Fishman (1933) – co-founder and executive secretary/treasurer of the Veterans of the Abraham Lincoln Brigade
- George Silides (1938) – served in the Alaska Senate; businessman
- J. Owen Zurhellen Jr. (c. 1938) – the first United States Ambassador to Suriname
- Sy Schulman (ca. 1944) – civil engineer and urban planner, mayor of White Plains, New York
- Howard Golden (1945) – served as Brooklyn borough president
- Serphin R. Maltese (c. 1950) – longstanding New York State Senator
- Roy Innis (1952) – served as national chairman of the Congress of Racial Equality; member of the National Rifle Association's governing board
- Bob Moses (1952) – organizer of 1964 Freedom Summer; MacArthur Fellow
- Bernard W. Nussbaum (1954) – law; served on the United States House Committee on the Judiciary during the Watergate impeachment inquiry, served as counsel to President Bill Clinton
- Richard Ben-Veniste (1960) – law; assistant prosecutor on the Watergate Task Force, served on the 9/11 Commission
- Harvey Pitt (1961) – chairman of the Securities and Exchange Commission
- Ted Gold (1964) – political activist and Weathermen member
- Dick Gottfried (1964) – New York State Assemblyman
- Dick Morris (1964) – political consultant
- Jerry Nadler (1965) – U.S. congressman
- Eric Holder (1969) – United States attorney general in President Barack Obama's administration
- John Tsang Chun-wah (1969) – Financial Secretary of the Hong Kong Special Administrative Region
- David Axelrod (c. 1972) – senior advisor to Barack Obama's campaign
- Alan Jay Gerson (1975) – served on New York City Council
- Eva Moskowitz (1982) – served on New York City Council and founded the Success Academy Charter Schools
- Dianne Morales (1985) – non-profit executive and political candidate
- Kathryn Garcia (1988) – commissioner of the New York City Sanitation Department and political candidate
- Jessica Lappin (1993) – served on New York City Council
- Grace Meng (1993) – U.S. congresswoman
- Micah Lasher (1999) – New York State Assemblyman

== Sports ==
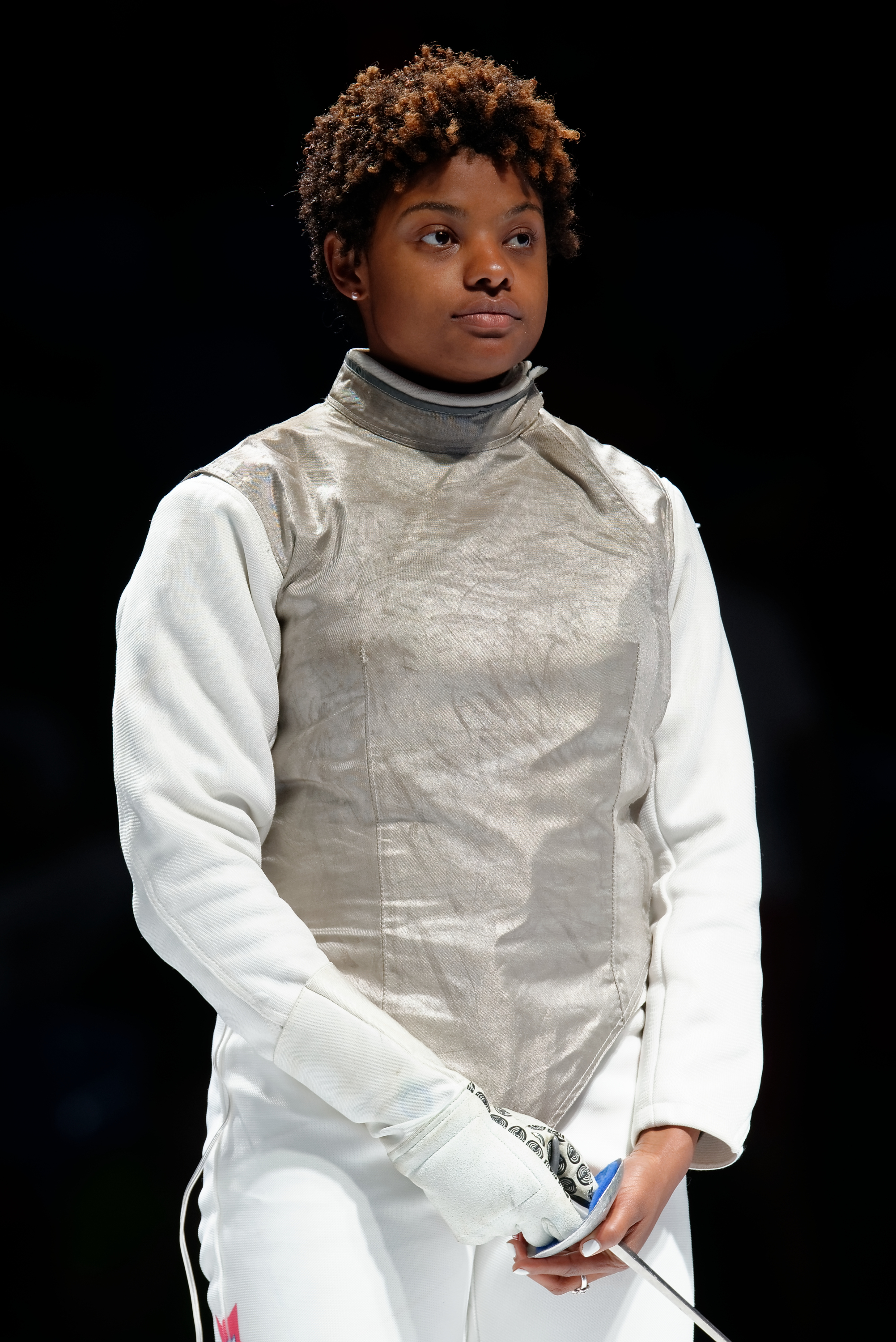
Nzingha Prescod

- Herbert Vollmer (1914) – 1924 Olympic bronze medalist in water polo
- Ray Arcel (1917) – member of International Boxing Hall of Fame
- Frank Hussey (1924) – sprinter; 1924 Olympic gold medalist in the 4×100m relay
- Albert Axelrod (1938) – 1960 Olympic bronze medalist in foil fencing, 5x Olympian, member of the USFA Hall of Fame
- Nat Militzok (ca. 1941) – NBA basketball player
- Harold Goldsmith – Olympic foil and épée fencer; 3x Olympian; member of the USFA Hall of Fame
- Herbert Cohen (c. 1958) – 2x Olympic foil fencer; coached the fencing team
- Jack Molinas (1949) – former NBA All-Star player and key figure in the 1961 NCAA University Division men's basketball gambling scandal
- Charlie Scott (1966) – former NBA player and Olympic gold medalist in 1968
- Robert Hess (2009) – chess Grandmaster
- Nzingha Prescod (2010) – 2x Olympic foil fencer, member of the USFA Hall of Fame
- Krystal Lara (2016) – Olympic swimmer for the Dominican Republic

== Other ==
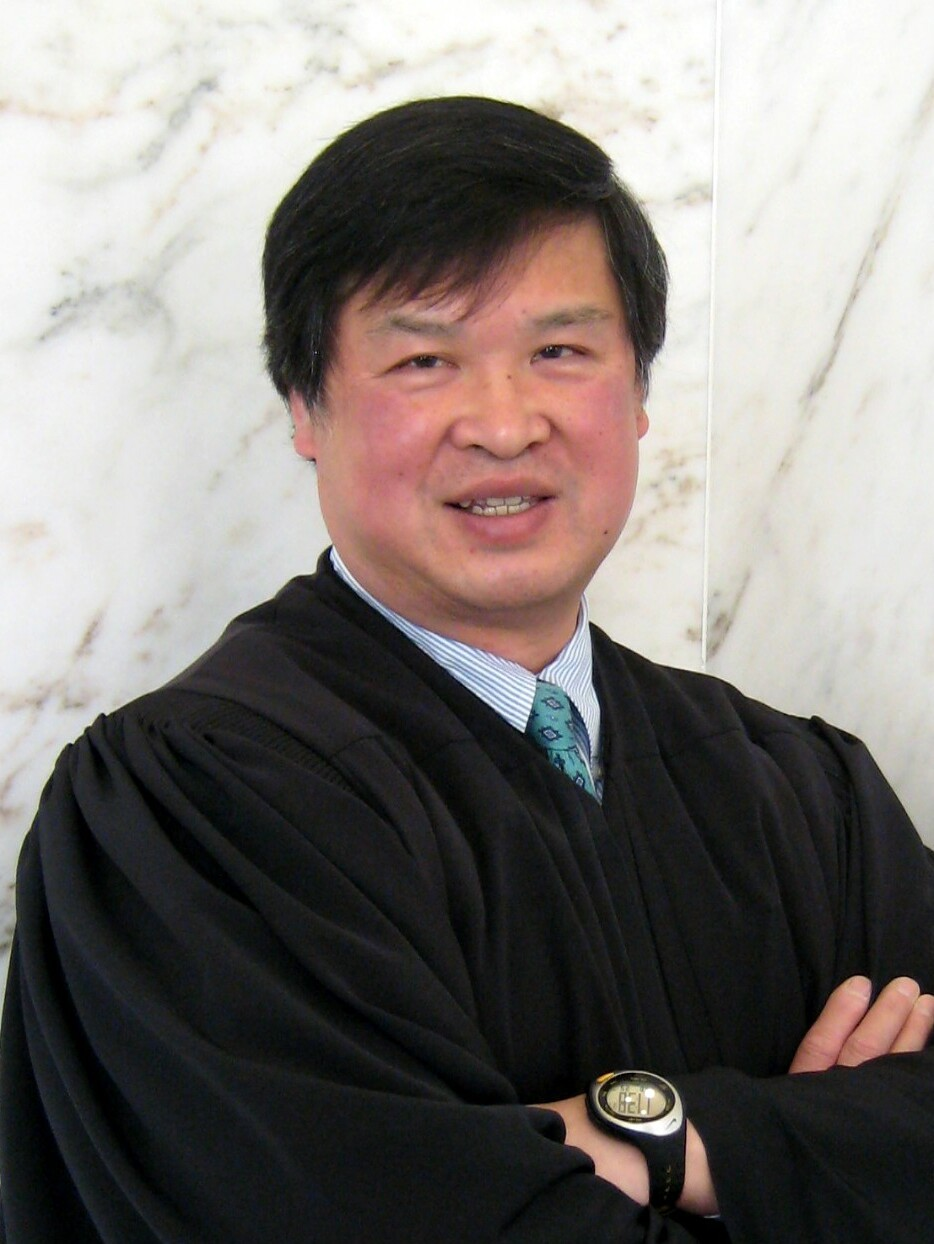
Denny Chin

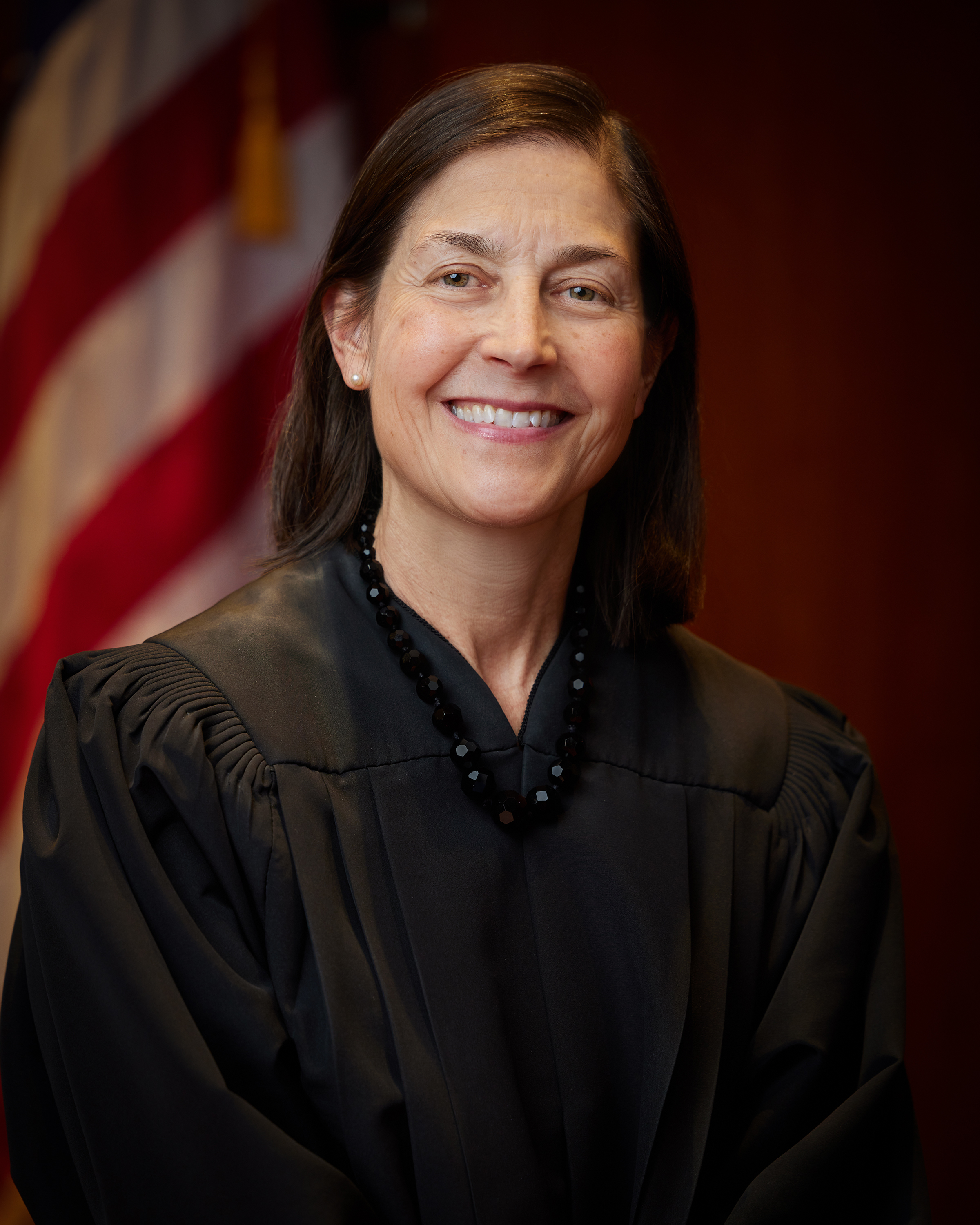
Karin Immergut

- Otto Soglow (1913–1915) – Reuben Award-winning New Yorker cartoonist and creator of The Little King comic strip; dropped out of Stuyvesant to support his family
- George Kisevalter (c. 1925) – Central Intelligence Agency operations officer; handled Major Pyotr Popov, the first Soviet GRU agent run by the CIA, and Colonel Oleg Penkovsky
- Morton Sobell (c. 1935) – convicted spy
- Max Elitcher (c. 1935) – witness at the trial of Julius and Ethel Rosenberg
- Charles Dryden (c. 1937) – member of the Tuskegee Airmen in World War II
- George Segal (1941) – sculptor
- Edwin Torres (c. 1949) – judge and author (Carlito's Way)
- John Schoenherr (c. 1953) – mammologist and illustrator
- Randolph Jackson (1960) – judge and author
- Denny Chin (1971) – judge on the U.S. Court of Appeals for the Second Circuit
- Karin Immergut (1978) – United States district judge of the United States District Court for the District of Oregon
- Victoria Kolakowski (1978) – judge on the Alameda County Superior Court; transgender activist
- Batsheva Hay – fashion designer
- Arvind Mahankali (2017) – winner of 2013 Scripps National Spelling Bee
- Hank Chien - plastic surgeon who formerly held a world record score in the video game Donkey Kong
