= John Tartaglia's ImaginOcean =

John Tartaglia's ImaginOcean is an Off Broadway musical about fish. It was written by and stars John Tartaglia, whose previous theatre acting credits include Avenue Q and Beauty and the Beast. The show played at New World Stages, which is also where the show that launched his career, Avenue Q, played. The book is by Tartaglia, and the musical score is by William Wade. Like Avenue Q, ImaginOcean utilizes puppetry, but unlike that show, ImaginOcean is aimed at children and the actors performing the puppets are not seen onstage.

The idea for ImaginOcean came about when show creator John Tartaglia took a snorkeling trip in the Virgin Islands. The show was originally performed on the Royal Caribbean ship Oasis of the Seas before moving to New World Stages. According to a Newsday interview, two foreign productions, a national tour, and a film adaptation of the show were planned. In June 2023, the show opened at SeaWorld San Antonio in the Sea Star Theater, running multiple performances a day. The show utilizes blacklight sets and lighting as well as puppets with fabrics that work well with blacklight, giving the illusion that the puppets are floating against the black background. As such, the show is marketed as the first "glow-in-the-dark" musical.

== Characters ==
- Dorsel - A green show fish who is afraid of germs and trying new things.
- Tank - An orange anglerfish who is one of Dorsel's best friends
- Bubbles - A rainbow fish who is one of Dorsel's best friends
- Leonard - A magenta and purple octopus who Dorsel meets after he gets separated from Tank and Bubbles.
- Ripple - A seahorse who serves as the protector of Seaweed Scuttle.

== Synopsis ==
[Overture.] Tank, Dorsel and Bubbles are playing when they discover a treasure map. They decide to follow it to find the treasure and they are led to Shell Reef. [On Our Way.] When they get there, Tank saves a baby jellyfish from being stuck under a rock and in return, the jellyfish family throws a party. [Jellyfish Jive.] On their way to the next location on the map, they lose their way and have to decide which arrow to follow to get to Seaweed Scuttle. [Which Way To Turn.] They eventually figure out which the direction to go and arrive at their next destination. At Seaweed Scuttle, the fish trio meet the protector, a seahorse named Ripple. Ripple informs them that the only way they can pass through is to use their imagination. [Imagination.] Tank, Bubbles and Ripple get sucked away by a giant wave leaving Dorsel alone and scared. Dorsel is initially frightened by an octopus named Leonard, before the two become friends. Leonard enlists Dorsel to help him retrieve his favorite pebble that fell down a small cave. Dorsel overcomes his fear and travels through the cave and successfully gets the pebble. [Just A Stones Throw Away.] Leonard is so thankful to Dorsel that he offers to help him find Tank and Bubbles. [On Our Way, Reprise] They find the treasure chest and instead of gold, diamonds or rubies, they learn that the true treasure is their friendship. [Finale.]

== Songs ==
- Overture
- On Our Way
- Jellyfish Jive
- Which Way to Turn
- Imagination
- Just a Stone's Throw Away
- On Our Way (Reprise)
- Finale

== Tour ==
ImaginOcean' first and third tours remained in the United States, with the second traveling overseas.

== Notable cast members ==
- Dorsel (voiced by John Tartaglia): Ryan Dillon, David Corris, Nate Begle, Arlee Chadwick
- Tank (voiced by Tartaglia): James Wojtal Jr, Jonathan Carlucci, Weston Long
- Bubbles (voiced by Donna Drake): Stacey Weingarten, Haley Jenkins, Emily Tucker, Meghan Miller
- Ripple (voiced by Michael Shawn Lewis) and Leonard (voiced by Tartaglia): Lara MacLean, Daniel Eli Becker, Drew Torkelson
- Baby Jellyfish (voiced by Michael Shawn Lewis): Carole D'Agostino, Emily Tucker, Leanne Brunn
- Whipper (voiced by Tartaglia): Jonathan Carlucci, Matthew Wojtal
- Snapper (voiced by Tartaglia): Brian Carson, Ben Durocher, Christina Stone
