= Dragon Fire =

Dragon Fire may refer to:

- In fiction and mythology, the ability of dragons to exhale fire, or any of several things which allude to this power
- Dragon Fire (roller coaster), a roller coaster at Canada's Wonderland
- Dragon Fire (novel), a 2000 political novel by journalist Humphrey Hawksley about a future war between China, Pakistan, and India
- Dragon Fire (mortar), a heavy automated mortar under testing by the United States Marine Corps
- Dragon Fire (film), a 1993 martial arts film starring several kickboxing champions
- Quest for Glory V: Dragon Fire, the final game in the Quest for Glory series by Sierra

Dragonfire may refer to:

- Dragonfire (Doctor Who), a 1987 serial in the science fiction television series Doctor Who
- Dragonfire (video game), a 1982 video game released by Imagic
- Dragonfire (novel) an Andrew Kaplan spy thriller about a CIA agent trying to prevent another Southeast war
- Alternate title of Tagget, a 1991 spy film/thriller
- Dragonfire II: The Dungeonmaster's Assistant, a 1985 computer program for managing tabletop role-playing games
- DragonFire (weapon), a British directed-energy weapon technology demonstrator

== See also ==
- Dragon's Fire, a novel in the Dragonriders of Pern series.
- Dragon's breath (ammunition)
