= Regular Joe (TV series) =

- Genre: Sitcom
- Created by: David Litt
- Starring: Daniel Stern; John Francis Daley; Kelly Karbacz; Brian George; Judd Hirsch
- Composer: Jonathan Wolff
- Country of origin: United States
- Original language: English
- No. of seasons: 1
- No. of episodes: 6 (2 unaired)

Production
- Camera setup: Multi-camera
- Running time: 30 minutes
- Production companies: Fatty McButterpants Productions; Wass-Stein Productions; Touchstone Television

Original release
- Network: ABC
- Release: March 28 – April 18, 2003

Regular Joe is an American sitcom that aired from March 28 until April 18, 2003 on ABC.

== Premise ==
Widower Joe Binder runs a family-owned hardware store while four generations of the Binder family live under his roof.

== Cast ==
- Daniel Stern as Joe Binder
- John Francis Daley as Grant Binder
- Kelly Karbacz as Joanie Binder
- Brian George as Sitvar
- Judd Hirsch as Baxter Binder

== Episodes ==
No.	Title	Directed by	Written by	Original release date	U.S. viewers (millions)
1	"Puppetry of the Pennies"	Gary Halvorson	David Litt	March 28, 2003	6.38
Joanie gets accepted at Columbia University and takes a job as a waitress to pay for tuition. Joe denies Grant a job at the hardware store.
2	"Time and Punishment"	Ted Wass	Joe Port and Joe Wiseman	April 4, 2003	5.66
Joe wants a "family night" once a week.
3	"Boobysitting"	Rob Schiller	Joe Port and Joe Wiseman	April 11, 2003	4.57
Baxter is skeptical of Joe's ability to run the hardware store. The new babysitter thought she was going to watch a dog.
4	"The Mourning After"	Ted Wass	David Litt	April 18, 2003	4.71
Baxter and the kids want Joe to go out on a date for the first time since his wife's death.
5	"Queens Boulevard of Broken Dreams"	David Litt	Phill Lewis	Unaired	N/A
6	"Butt-Out-Ski"	Fred Savage	Ted Wass	Unaired	N/A
