= Scorpion (novel) =

1985 spy thriller novel by Andrew Kaplan

- First edition cover
- Author: Andrew Kaplan
- Genre: Thriller
- Publisher: Macmillan Publishers
- Publication date: March 18, 1986
- ISBN: 978-0-02-560710-1

Scorpion is a spy thriller novel by American author Andrew Kaplan, published by Macmillan in hardcover in 1985 and as a Warner Books paperback in 1986. It hit best-seller lists in Canada, the UK, Australia, Germany and Greece.

== Plot summary ==
As the President of Russia dies, his deputy, Fyedorenko makes a mysterious phone call. A beautiful young American woman, Kelly Ormont, is brutally abducted from the streets of Paris into white slavery. In a safe house in Pakistan, a senior CIA director, Bob Harris, recruits a free-lance ex-CIA agent, codenamed “Scorpion” to rescue Kelly, a Congressman’s daughter, last seen on a flight to Bahrain. The Scorpion follows the trail to Bahrain and Saudi Arabia, where he uncovers a plot to assassinate the King of Arabia, while flashbacks reveal the Scorpion’s past as the orphaned son of an American oilman raised by a Bedouin desert tribe. At the King’s Camel Race, the Scorpion manages to foil the assassination plot. He is captured, but manages to escape with Kelly and kill Prince Sa'ad, author of the assassination plot. In Washington, the Scorpion confronts Harris who reveals the whole thing was a CIA and French SDECE plot to pre-empt the Russians in the Gulf with Kelly in on it, thinking she was working for the Israelis. Fyedorenko is replaced by an accomplice because of the plot’s failure as the Scorpion returns to his shadowy battles in Afghanistan.

== Release details ==
- 1986, Macmillan Publishing Company, hardcover, ISBN 0-02-560710-3
- July 1987, Warner Books, paperback, ISBN 0-446-34433-8
- 1985, Arrow Books, paperback, ISBN 0-09-941810-X
- 1986, Century Hutchinson, hardcover, ISBN 0-7126-9547-8
- 1990, Goldmann Verlag, paperback, ISBN 3-442-09257-4
- 1988, Bell (Greek), paperback
