= John Tartaglia =

American puppeteer, actor, and singer (b. 1978)

- Born: John Nicholas Tartaglia; February 16, 1978 (age 48)
- Other names: John Nicholas Tartaglia; Jonathan Nicholas Tartaglia
- Occupations: Puppeteer; actor; singer
- Years active: 1994–present
- Spouse: Michael Shawn Lewis (m. 2012; div. 2016)

John Nicholas Tartaglia (/tɑːrˈtæɡliə/; born February 16, 1978) is an American puppeteer, actor, and singer.

== Early life ==
Tartaglia grew up in Maple Shade Township, New Jersey, and graduated from Upper Dublin High School in Fort Washington, Pennsylvania, in 1996.

Tartaglia joined Sesame Street's puppetry team in a part-time capacity at the age of 16. He performed and assisted many minor characters, including Phoebe, and was the understudy for Kevin Clash's Elmo. He performed as Ernie for the second season of Play with Me Sesame and as Oscar the Grouch for Sesame Street 4D. Tartaglia was also a digital puppeteer for the "Elmo's World" segments and performed the character Tingo on Sesame English. He became a full-time part of Sesame Street at the age of 18.

== Career ==
In 2003, Tartaglia performed as DJ 2 in Animal Jam. He created and puppeteered the roles of Princeton and Rod in the Tony Award-winning Broadway musical Avenue Q, which opened on July 31, 2003. He was nominated for the Tony Award for Best Actor in a Musical in 2004 and left the cast on January 30, 2005. Tartaglia reprised these roles in the Las Vegas production of Avenue Q from August to December 2005. He then appeared in Newsical 2006: The Next Edition in December 2005.

In 2006, Tartaglia joined the cast of Beauty and the Beast as Lumière until June 2007. He created, executive produced, and starred in the Playhouse Disney short series Johnny and the Sprites, which expanded to a full 30-minute series on January 13, 2007. In 2007, Tartaglia provided the voice for Mr. Bluelight in Kmart commercials.

Tartaglia played Pinocchio, Puss in Boots, and the Magic Mirror, and puppeteered the dragon in Shrek The Musical. The show opened on Broadway on December 14, 2008. Tartaglia performed until August 16, 2009, returned on December 14, 2009, and stayed until the production closed on January 3, 2010.

He created and wrote John Tartaglia's ImaginOcean, which ran Off-Broadway at New World Stages from March 31, 2010, to September 4, 2011. The show, featuring glow-in-the-dark puppets, was nominated for the 2010 Drama Desk Award for Unique Theatrical Experience.

Tartaglia performed in The Temperamentals at the Blank Theatre Company in Los Angeles from April 9 to May 22, 2011. He appeared at the 14th annual Broadway Bares in 2004, which raised $525,000 for Broadway Cares/Equity Fights AIDS.

Tartaglia played Genie in the production of Aladdin at The Muny in St. Louis from July 5–13, 2012. In 2011, he was named a "Givenik Ambassador" by the Broadway/charity site Givenik. Tartaglia hosted a radio show on Sirius XM On Broadway called Sunday Funday with John Tartaglia. In 2016, he created the PBS Kids series Splash and Bubbles, voicing Splash and other recurring characters. In 2017, he performed Hank in the Netflix series Julie's Greenroom.

In January 2024, it was announced that Tartaglia had joined The Jim Henson Company's development team as creative supervisor of future Fraggle Rock projects, in addition to contributing to the development and production of new television and live show projects for the company. In 2026, Tartaglia was promoted to Vice-President of Development and Production at the company.

== Personal life ==
Tartaglia is gay. In 2012, Tartaglia married Michael Shawn Lewis in New York. They divorced in 2016.

In 2004, he helped to raise $525,000 for Broadway Cares/Equity Fights AIDS.

== Filmography ==
=== Film ===
- Elmopalooza - Additional Puppeteer
- Love the Hard Way - Jack (uncredited)
- Antwone Fisher - Dancer (uncredited)
- Honey 2 - Ballet Dancer
- The Women in Black - Jewelry Salesman (uncredited)
- The Happytime Murders - Additional Puppeteer

=== Television ===
- Animal Jam - DJ 2
- Bear in the Big Blue House - Additional Puppeteer
- Between the Lions - guest Sesame Street puppeteer (Elmo/Bert "Dance with Smartypants" segments)
- Dog City - Additional Puppeteer
- Play with Me Sesame - Ernie (Season 2)
- Fraggle Rock: Rock On! - Gobo Fraggle (taking over from Jerry Nelson); Boober Fraggle, Uncle Traveling Matt, and Wembley Fraggle (puppetry only)
- Fraggle Rock: Back to the Rock - Gobo Fraggle, Sprocket, Architect Doozer, Gunge, and Barry Blueberry; Lyle Craggle (puppetry only)
- Julie's Greenroom - Hank
- Elmo's World: Computer Graphic Puppeteer
- Johnny and the Sprites: Johnny, Sage
- The Muppet Show: Supporting Muppet Performer
- Sesame English: Tingo
- Sesame Street: Alfred Duck, Phoebe (2002), The Great Quackini, Trey, Cookie Monster's Mommy (2004), Brandeis, Safety Chicken, Yip-Yip Martian, Various
- Splash and Bubbles: Splash, Various
- Word Party: Kip the Wallaby (voice)
- The Wubbulous World of Dr. Seuss: Bird, Delivery Man

== Stage ==
Year	Title	Role	Theatre	Notes
2003	Avenue Q	Princeton/Rod	Vineyard Theatre	Original
2003	Avenue Q	Princeton/Rod	John Golden Theatre	Original
2006–2007	Beauty and the Beast	Lumiere	Lunt-Fontanne Theatre	Replacement
2008	Shrek the Musical	Pinocchio, Magic Mirror	5th Avenue Theatre	Original
2008–2009	Shrek the Musical	Pinocchio, Magic Mirror	Broadway Theatre	Original
2012	Aladdin	Genie	The Muny	

Preceded by Jerry Nelson	Gobo Fraggle; 2013–present	Succeeded by None
Preceded by Alice Dinnean	Phoebe; 2002	Succeeded by None
Preceded by Steve Whitmire	Sprocket; 2021–present	Succeeded by None
Preceded by Richard Hunt	Gunge; 2022–present	Succeeded by None
Preceded by Jerry Nelson	Architect Doozer; 2022–present	Succeeded by None
