= Kelly Karbacz =

American actress

Kelly Ann Karbacz
- Education: Stuyvesant High School (1996); Lee Strasberg Theatre Institute
- Occupation: Actress
- Spouse: Phillip James Griffith (m. 2007)

Kelly Ann Karbacz is an American actress.

== Early life and education ==
Karbacz was born in Queens, New York and raised in Queens and Manhattan. In 1996, Karbacz graduated from Stuyvesant High School in New York City. She attended the Lee Strasberg Theatre Institute, part of the Tisch School of the Arts at New York University.

== Personal life ==
In 2005, Karbacz met Phillip James Griffith on the production of But I'm a Cheerleader for the New York Musical Theatre Festival and they married in September 2007.

== Credits ==
=== Filmography ===
Year	Title	Role	Episode	Ref(s)
1999	Sesame English	Niki	2 episodes	
2001	Law & Order: Special Victims Unit	Jill Foster	Episode: "Runaway"	
2002	Undeclared	Jane	Episode: "The Day After"	
2002	Law and Order	Jenny Snyder	Episode: "Dazzled"	
2002	Rubout	Jennifer	TV movie	
2003	Regular Joe	Joanie Binder	Main role; 5 episodes: "Puppetry of the Pennies", "Time and Punishment", "Boobysitting", "The Mourning After" and "Butt Out Ski"	
2003	A Tale of Two Pizzas	Lisa		
2004	Without a Trace	Sara	Episode: "Gung-Ho"	
2004	First Breath	Hannah		
2005	Law & Order: Criminal Intent	Renata Virgini	Episode: "Unchained"	
2007	Queens Supreme	Ms. Schmidt	Episode: "Let's Make a Deal"	
2008	Get Smart	Judy		
2008	Get Smart's Bruce and Lloyd: Out of Control	Judy	Direct-to-video	
2012	Law and Order: Special Victims Unit	Jess Whitley	Episode: "Father's Shadow"	
2013	Do No Harm	Lt. Tracey McCoy	Episode: "But I'm Allergic to Cats"	
2016–2017, 2019	Orange Is the New Black	Kasey Sankey	Recurring role (season 4-5), guest (season 7)	
2020	Chicago Med	Kim Tyler	Guest Episode: It May Not Be Forever	

=== Theatre ===
Year	Production	Role	Notes	Ref(s)
2005	Rent	Maureen Johnson	Broadway; Nederlander Theater	
2005	But I'm A Cheerleader	Graham	New York Musical Theatre Festival	
September 2006	Nighthawks		Inspired by the Edward Hopper painting of the same name; Kirk Douglas Theatre	
2010	I Got Fired	Jenny	New York Musical Theatre Festival	
2012	First Date	Casey	Seattle production	
