= Hour of the Assassins =

1980 novel by Andrew Kaplan

Hour of the Assassins is the first spy thriller novel by author Andrew Kaplan, originally published by Dell Publishing.

== Plot summary ==
Ex-CIA agent, John Caine, is hired by Wasserman, a Holocaust survivor, who has become a Hollywood porn king, to find and kill Dr. Josef Mengele, the infamous Angel of Death of Auschwitz, who has eluded pursuers for more than 30 years. After an encounter with Wasserman's mistress, C.J., Caine begins a hunt for Mengele that will lead him from Europe to an encounter with the Neo-Nazi ODESSA ring in Paraguay to Jerusalem and Vienna, where he learns of a plot called "Starfish" and escapes ODESSA agents with a lead to South America. Deep in the Amazon jungle, he finds a medical clinic for Indians run by a Dr. Mendoza, who turns out to be Mengele. Captured, Caine manages to kill Mengele and escape into the jungle pursued by headhunting Indians. He makes his way to Lima, where he meets C.J., who betrays him to the Peruvian police, who arrest him for Mendoza's murder. Caine's CIA case officer, Harris, springs him from jail and reveals an oil strike in the Amazon that was behind the Starfish conspiracy to take over South America. Landing in Los Angeles, Caine finds Wasserman who is revealed as a Nazi, von Schiffen, who had taken the identity of the Jew, Wasserman and who needed Mengele dead as part of the oil conspiracy. Caine kills von Schiffen and he and C.J. escape together.

== Release details ==
- 1980, Dell Publishing Co., paperback, ISBN 978-0-440-13530-2
- September 1987, Warner Books, paperback, ISBN 978-0-446-34630-6
- 1980, Fontana, paperback
- 1987, Arrow Books, ISBN 0-09-948450-1
