= Amol Sarva =

American entrepreneur

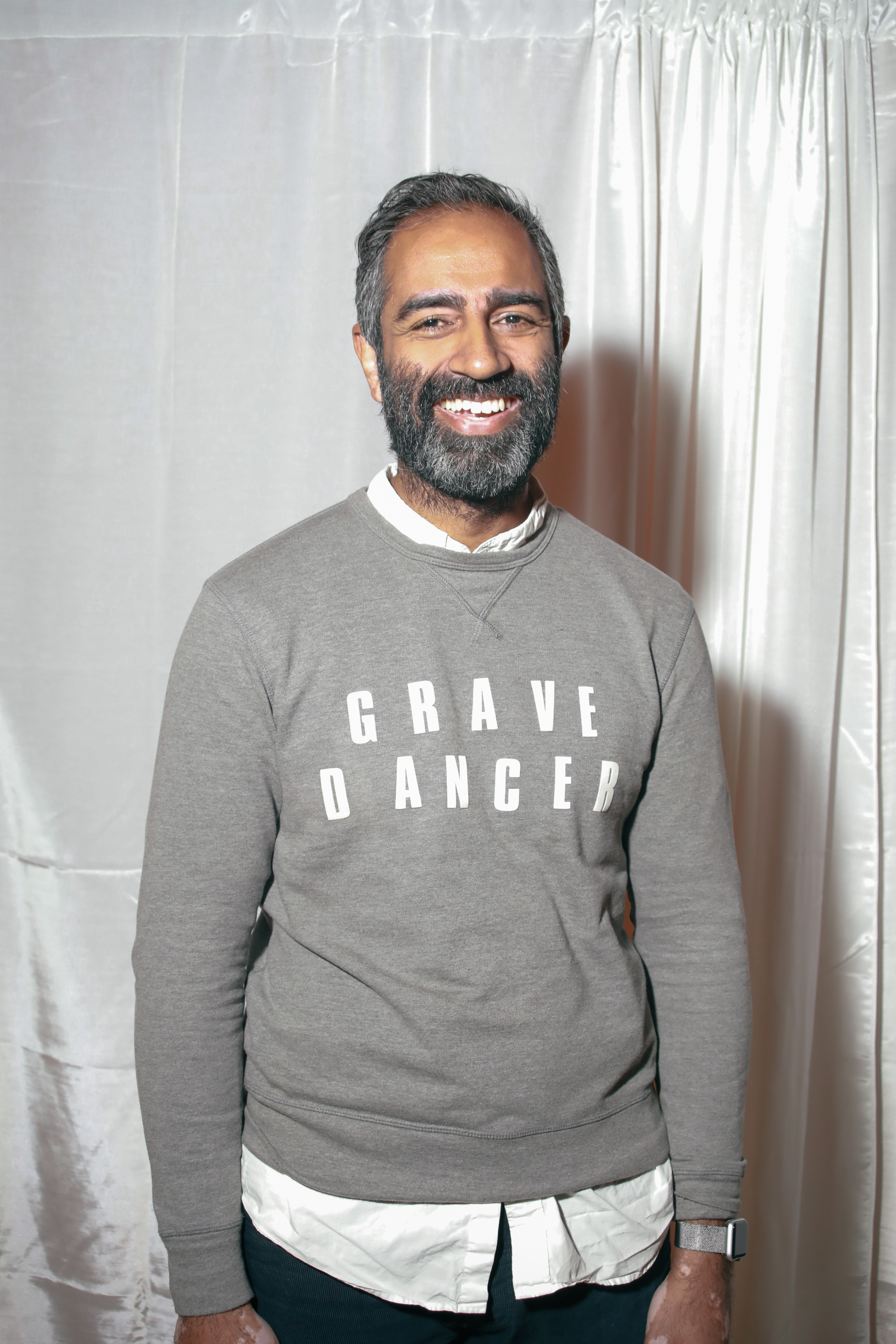
- Sarva in 2019
- Born: Amol Sarva; New York City, U.S.
- Education: Columbia University (BA); Stanford University (PhD)
- Occupation: Entrepreneur
- Title: Founder of Knotel, Inc.

Amol Sarva is an American entrepreneur who founded Knotel, Halo Neuroscience, Knote, Peek, and Virgin Mobile USA.

== Early life and education ==
Born and raised in New York City to Indian-American parents, Amol Sarva attended Stuyvesant High School.

He double-majored in philosophy and economics at Columbia University in New York, where he also founded his first startup (a web development firm called Netatomic) and worked with several Silicon Alley startups including Sonata (backed by Union Square Ventures' founder Fred Wilson's earlier venture fund, Flatiron Partners) and Gobi (an internet service provider sold to the public company Earthlink).

In graduate school, Sarva completed his doctorate from Stanford University in philosophy, with a dissertation in cognitive science titled "The Concept of Modularity in Cognitive Science". While at Stanford, he was involved with web technology (blogging, marketplaces) and startups - Virgin Mobile, Cymerc (backed by Gus Tai of Trinity Ventures), and also Gobi, chief among them.

== Business profile ==
Sarva is an American entrepreneur and technology policy advocate known for co-founding two significant mobile service companies, Virgin Mobile USA and Peek as well as Halo Neuroscience, Knotable and Knotel. Since 2012, he has backed nearly 100 startups including JUMP (acquired by Uber), Marley Spoon (publicly listed), CoverWallet (acquired by AON), and Goodco (acquired by Axel Springer).

At Virgin, he was one of the three earliest members of a team that created the MVNO (mobile virtual network operator) concept in the US. He helped raise $550 million, negotiate the joint-venture with Sprint, design the core product, hire the CTO, and hire the future CEO. At the time of his departure, Virgin Mobile had no revenues or customers. It went public in 2007 with a billion-dollar valuation.

Founder of Peek in late 2007, along with several of his former Virgin colleagues, he introduced the world's first mobile device dedicated to email. The product evolved to support a wider range of real-time web services including email, SMS, social networking. Peek launched services in the US, Europe, and Asia. Peek was awarded numerous prizes including Time's Gadget of the Year and in 2012 the GSMA Nomination for Best Technology. In 2012, Peek service was discontinued. Peek's software was incorporated into Twitter's Vine app and Viber. After acquiring Peek's platform, Bharti Softbank's Hike app reached 100 million monthly active users.

In late 2012, Sarva created Halo Neuroscience, a company focused on neurostimulation technology for enhancing cognitive function. He recruited two cofounders — Dan Chao and Lee von Kraus - and raised the first $1 million to launch the effort. Halo served numerous elite sports and military organizations including the US Olympic team, tennis champions, and the US and UK special forces, and was acquired by med tech company Flow Neuroscience. Sarva served on the board of directors through 2017.

Also in 2012, Sarva cofounded Knotable, the company that makes the collaborative application Knote.com.

He created a series of courses at Columbia University that he has taught since 2016.

In January 2016, Sarva launched Knotel, the flexible office platform that in 2020 operated across more than 500 buildings in 27 cities in 10 countries, reaching $370mm in revenues before COVID and later acquisition .

In January 2021, one month after the availability of the COVID vaccine, Knotel announced an acquisition plan by public company Newmark and restructuring plan, despite raising substantial equity from investors and being valued at over $1 billion in 2019. Sarva left the company and did not stay on with Newmark.

During 2021, Sarva co-created several new companies and launched a venture capital fund called Life Extension Ventures.

== Public policy ==
Sarva founded the Wireless Founders Coalition For Innovation in 2007 and appeared in US Senate hearings and Federal Communications Commission (FCC) panels on the subject of competition in US telecom.

He was an advisor to Frontline Wireless in 2007-2008. In 2012, the US Congress announced a plan to implement the public safety and re-apportioning plan promoted originally by Frontline.

He has been active in supporting American political candidates. He has opposed the 2016-elected President publicly and supported alternative candidates for 2020 as well as many Senate and House candidates.

== Real estate ==
Sarva built a 20,000 square foot, 9 story, architecturally-notable apartment building in Long Island City, Queens, New York from the ground up that was completed in 2012.
