= Sesame English =

American educational children's TV series

- Genre: Children's television series Educational
- Directed by: Emily Squires
- Starring: John Tartaglia; Kelly Karbacz
- Theme music composer: Joe Carroll; Peter Thom
- Country of origin: United States
- Original language: English
- No. of episodes: 52

Production
- Executive producer: Lewis J. Bernstein
- Producer: Jill Gluckson
- Production locations: Kaufman Astoria Studios; Queens, New York City, New York
- Editors: Scott Chosed; Will Hall
- Camera setup: Multi-camera
- Running time: 15 minutes
- Production companies: Sesame Workshop; Berlitz International

Original release
- Release: July 2000 – December 27, 2000

Sesame English is an American television/video series developed as a collaboration between Sesame Workshop and Berlitz International. Launched in development in October 1, 1999, with Taiwan and China as the debut markets, the series differs from the typical international versions of Sesame Street in that it was devised as a supplement to ESL (English as a Second Language) instruction. Previously, the original Sesame Street was aired in some countries as an English learning television series despite co-productions already existing. The target age group is children from 4 to 7 years old.

== Format ==
The project included 78 15-minute episodes for TV, along with instructional materials for print, audio, video, and CD-ROMs (although only 52 episodes were made). Dr. Lewis Bernstein, producer and key developer of the series, explained that "The aim is to introduce English phrases and vocabulary in an entertaining way, using conversational language along with repetition, rhythm and rhyme, cool music styles, and lots of humor—much the way we do on Sesame Street." Each quarter-hour episode combined new framing footage with Sesame Street inserts and clips from seasons 1 to 32.

The series stars a new Muppet character, Tingo, a multilingual "international tiger-like monster". Though all of the new footage was filmed in New York studios, 30 to 50 percent of Tingo's dialogue is dubbed into the native language of the target country. Tingo addresses viewers directly in the region specific language, but all other dialogue is in English. Tingo's explanations thus provide a bridge for native speakers to adjust to English.

In 2003, Sesame Workshop announced a new variation, using the same footage, Sesame Español. Intended for viewing at Berlitz Language Centers, the variation used the same approach, only with Spanish as Tingo's secondary language, and with the aim now being instruction in Spanish for English-only speakers.

== Release ==
Japan began airing the show in April 2001 under the name Sesame Eigo World. Italy began airing the show in 2004, and Poland began to air in April 2005 on minimini and as part of Sezamkowy Zakątek from 2006 to 2008 (titled Sezamkowy Angielski). In 2007 the show began airing on Azerbaijani Public Television. The show aired in Brazil in 2008 on TV Cultura, a year after the local version of Sesame Street returned to the country.

DVD releases of the series, available in the U.S., include five available audio languages for Tingo's dialogue: Spanish, Hmong, Korean, Mandarin Chinese, and Vietnamese. An English only track is included for more advanced ESL students.

== Characters and cast ==
Tingo, the only new Muppet character (performed and voiced by John Tartaglia), is a green, purple, and orange monster loosely resembling a tiger and an exchange student living in America with his best friend, Niki (played by Kelly Karbacz). Teenaged Niki lives in the basement of her parents' home, and has an extended circle of family and friends, including grandparents, siblings Katie and Kevin, baby Jake, and the members of her band. Niki's band, Children at Play, includes Mike, Sam (Samantha), and Tom. Stage actors Roger Bart and Jonathan Freeman play various members of Niki's circle, as well as episodic roles.

Plots center around sports activities, music, and family get-togethers and social events.

== See Also ==
- Sesame Street syndication packages
