= War of the Raven =

War of the Raven is a World War II spy thriller novel by author Andrew Kaplan, published in 1990 by Simon and Schuster. Called “a smashing, sexy and unforgettable read” by Publishers Weekly, it was an international best-seller.

== Plot summary ==
Raoul de Almayo, an Argentine society playboy is murdered by German agents in Buenos Aires in the early days of World War II. Charles Stewart, polo-playing American OSS secret agent, is sent to uncover the identity of the “Raven”, a spy in the German embassy in Buenos Aires to whom Raoul was the only link. Stewart's trail leads him to Argentina's decadent high society and an affair with the beautiful Julia Vargas. He uncovers a plot that may determine the course of the war, involving a coup against the Argentine government, the planned assassination of President Ortiz and the German battleship, Graf Spee, that is ravaging British shipping in the Atlantic. Stewart and Julia escape German agents, but Stewart is arrested by the notorious Colonel Fuentes, head of the Argentine secret police. Julia arranges Stewart's release, but the two of them are captured by Gestapo agents who intend to murder them as part of the coup plot. Meanwhile, flashbacks tell the brutal story of John Gideon, Julia's dead grandfather, who rose from a prison ship to become founder of Argentina's greatest fortune and whose life is somehow entwined in these events. Julia and Stewart escape the Germans and Stewart manages to get critical information to the British that leads to the Battle of the River Plate and the sinking of the Graf Spee. At a society polo match at Julia's estancia, Stewart manages to prevent the assassination and coup. Captured by the Germans and about to be shot, Stewart is saved by the Raven only to discover that the real author of the plot and these events was Julia, who takes her grandfather's final horrific revenge. In an epilogue at the Battle of Stalingrad, Stewart learns in a letter from the Raven of Julia's final fate.

== Release details ==
- 1990, Simon and Schuster, hardcover, ISBN 0-671-70758-2
- September 1991, Avon Books, paperback, ISBN 0-380-71472-8
- 1991, Arrow Books, paperback, ISBN 0-09-964320-0
- 1989, Century Hutchinson, hardcover, ISBN 0-7126-2576-3
