= Andrew Kaplan =

American author

- Born: Andrew Gary Kaplan; May 18, 1941 (age 85); New York City, U.S.
- Education: Stuyvesant High School; Brooklyn College; Tel Aviv University; Oregon State University (MBA)
- Occupation: Author
- Writing career
- Genre: Spy thriller
- Website: www.andrewkaplan.com

Andrew Gary Kaplan (born May 18, 1941) is an American author, best known for his spy thriller novels. He may also be the world's first "virtual person" with the creation and first release of "Andy-bot", a chat-bot created by the Hereafter company that is available on devices such as smart phones and personal devices like Alexa that exist even after the person has died.

== Biography ==
Kaplan was born in Brooklyn, New York on May 18, 1941. He went to Stuyvesant High School and Brooklyn College and after serving in the U.S. Army, he went to Europe and Africa, where he worked as a free-lance journalist and war correspondent for the International Herald Tribune in Paris. He served in the Israeli Army during the Six-Day War of 1967. As a student leader in Israel, he helped start what was initially called the University of the Negev (today, Ben Gurion University of the Negev) and the Israeli Olympic fencing team. After graduating from Tel Aviv University, he earned his MBA at Oregon State University. He has been a technology businessman and is the author of nine international best-selling novels, which have been translated into 22 languages around the world: Hour of the Assassins, Scorpion, Dragonfire (a main selection of the Book of the Month Club in Britain), War of the Raven and the other books of the Scorpion and Homeland series: Scorpion Betrayal, Scorpion Winter, Scorpion Deception, and Homeland: Carrie's Run, a bestselling original novel prequel to the hit award-winning Homeland television series . His second book in the Homeland series, Homeland: Saul's Game, won the 2015 Scribe Award for Best Original Media Tie-in Novel. In addition to working with the Homeland TV series, his screenwriting career includes the James Bond movie, Goldeneye.

On August 25, 2019, the Andy-bot, an artificial intelligence-driven "virtual or digital person" in which Andrew in his own voice conversationally recounts stories, thoughts and events in his life in response to questions and comments from whoever is interacting with the personal assistant or smart phone device. The Andy-bot would be available even after the person's death, possibly making it the world's first so-called "virtual person." Andrew is believed to be the first such person to have ever done this, as widely reported in media in the U.S., such as The Washington Post, NBC TV news and around the world, such as China's Tencent media.

== Bibliography ==
- Hour of the Assassins (1980, 1987)
- Scorpion (1985)
- Dragonfire (1987)
- War of the Raven (1990)
- Scorpion Betrayal (2012)
- Scorpion Winter (2012)
- Scorpion Deception (2013)
- Carrie's Run: A Homeland Novel (2013)
- Saul's Game: A Homeland Novel (2014)
- Blue Madagascar (2021)
- Once Upon A Villa (2024)
