= Meghan Miller =

Canadian geoscientist

Meghan S. Miller is a Canadian geoscientist based in Australia, who studies the structural and dynamical evolution of the Earth. She is a professor in the Research School of Earth Sciences at the Australian National University and the program leader of the AuScope Earth Imaging & Sounding program.

== Early life and education ==
Miller was born in British Columbia, Canada, and grew up in Phoenix, Arizona. She started her studies in Southern California, and then moved to New York, where she completed a Master of Science degree at Columbia University and a Master in Engineering in Geophysics at Cornell University. In 2006, Miller was awarded a Doctor of Philosophy degree conferred by the Australian National University, and her research was focused on studying the Earth's mantle structures using geophysical imagery.

== Career ==
From 2006 to 2008, Miller was a postdoctoral research associate at the University of British Columbia, Vancouver, Canada, and at Rice University in Texas, Houston. In 2009, she started working as an assistant professor at the University of Southern California. In 2015, she was promoted to associate professor with tenure at the same academic institution. In 2017, Miller moved to Australia to join the School of Earth Sciences at the Australian National University. She was promoted to full professor in January 2021.

Since 2017, Miller has led AuScope's Earth Imaging & Sounding Program, which aims to collect, process and provide geophysical datasets that allow end users to image the Earth's subsurface. Between 2016 and 2021, Miller was a member of the Board of Directors for the Seismological Society of America, specifically, she was part of the Diversity, Equity and Inclusion Committee and of the Honors Committee.

== Research interests and impact ==
Miller's research aims to understand the tectonic evolution of the Earth by using novel observational seismology techniques together with other geological and geophysical data. In particular, Miller investigates current subduction zones and cratons, such as Morocco, Indonesia, Timor Leste, Western Australia, Alaska and California, which provide insights into previous tectonic processes.

Miller is the leading author of two published articles in The Conversation. Her first article was published in 2020, with Louis Moresi as a co-author, discussing how COVID-19-related lockdowns in Australia allowed scientists to study minor earthquakes due to the decrease of noise and vibration produced by humans in motion. Miller was interviewed by ABC News following the 2023 Sunbury earthquake. During this interview, she explained the causes of the aftershocks that occurred after this 4.0 moment magnitude scale tremor, and provided insights into the regions in Australia where earthquakes are more likely to occur.

== Awards and honours ==
In 2006, Miller was awarded a Postdoctoral Fellowship by the Natural Sciences and Engineering Research Council of Canada. In 2011, Miller was awarded the Faculty Early Career Development (CAREER) Program, bestowed by the National Science Foundation of the United States government. This program assists early-career faculty-members who show promise in becoming exemplary academic models in both research and education.

In 2022, Miller started her Australian Research Council (ARC) Future Fellowship, focused on using Distributed acoustic sensing (DAS) to image with high-resolution the Earth's structure and to detect micro-seismicity.

== Selected work ==
- Miller, Meghan S.; Pickle, Robert; Murdie, Ruth; Yuan, Huaiyu; Allen, Trevor I.; Gessner, Klaus; Kennett, Brain L. N.; Whitney, Justin (2023-01-18). "Southwest Australia Seismic Network (SWAN): Recording Earthquakes in Australia's Most Active Seismic Zone". Seismological Research Letters. 94 (2A): 999–1011. doi:10.1785/0220220323. ISSN 0895-0695.
- Miller, M.S.; Zhang, P.; Dahlquist, M.P.; West, A.J.; Becker, T.W.; Harris, C.W. (2021). "Inherited lithospheric structures control arc-continent collisional heterogeneity". Geology. 49 (6): 652–656.
- Miller, Meghan S.; Ruppert, Natalia A.; Abers, Geoffrey (2020-09-23). "Introduction to the Focus Section on EarthScope Alaska and Canada". Seismological Research Letters. 91 (6): 3015–3016. doi:10.1785/0220200307. ISSN 0895-0695.
- Miller, Meghan S. (2020-06-12). "Mapping Earth's deepest secrets". Science. 368 (6496): 1183–1184. doi:10.1126/science.abc3134. ISSN 0036-8075.
