= Peek (mobile Internet device) =

Former mobile technology company

- Manufacturers: Peek, Inc.
- Availability by region: September 2008
- Compatible networks: Peek, T-Mobile, KPN, Aircel
- Dimensions: 4.0" × 2.7" × 0.4"
- Weight: 3.8 oz (109 g)
- Operating system: Peekux SDK on Mentor Graphics Nucleus
- CPU: 104 MHz.
- Memory: 8 MB internal storage
- Display: 2.5" diagonal
- Connectivity: GSM tri-band US, Euro, India
- Data inputs: QWERTY keyboard, scroll wheel, back button.
- Website: www.getpeek.com (archived)

Peek, Inc.
- Type: Privately held company
- Industry: Mobile Internet
- Founded: 2007
- Headquarters: New York City

Peek Inc. was a technology company founded in 2007. Headquartered in New York City from 2008 to 2012, the company offered a series of mobile handheld devices that provided access to email and various social networks.

== Company ==
Peek was founded in 2007 by three of the first four employees at Virgin Mobile USA: Rob Gray, Virgin's first head of product marketing, CEO Dr. Amol Sarva, and John Tantum, Virgin's first employee and first President. The company had offices in New York City, New Delhi, India, Nanjing, China, and staff in Arizona, California, and Toronto.

== Peek software and cloud ==
Peek's product is a family of applications for mobile devices that major device producers license and pre-install onto systems. These applications include push email, Instant Message and chat, social networking apps, synchronization and backup, and other mobile features. These apps are tailored to the lower-cost and simpler hardware that dominates the global phone market and rely on the Peek cloud architecture to offload computing and storage from the phone to the cloud.

== History ==
In September 2008, the original Peek email device was launched in the United States and was sold at the price of USD99.00. On September 12, 2008, Peek received its first review in a major outlet when David Pogue called it "sweet", "simple" and "elegant", and predicted that Peek's model would win "quiet, gradual popular acceptance by normal people".

In April 2009, Peek launched their second device, the Peek Pronto, which supported Push email ('instant' delivery), Microsoft Exchange, increased support for email attachments (PDFs, DOC, and pictures), and unlimited texting support.

TwitterPeek is a mobile device that allows users to send and receive tweets using Twitter. It is the first Twitter-only mobile device. It went on sale on November 3, 2009. Its price was set at USD100.00 and came with six months of service. The service costs USD8.00 monthly, but users could also pay USD200.00 upfront for lifetime service.

In 2010, Peek refreshed its lineup with Peek 9, adding Facebook, Twitter, and other social and news features.

In 2011, the first 3rd party handsets were launched by fast-growing producers such as MicroMax in India. The Peek software brings smartphone features to these low-cost handhelds.

In 2012, Peek announced that it was going to end support for all Peek devices and instead shift its attention to the cloud.

== Technology ==
The 2008 Peek device was designed by Peek in partnership with IDEO and BYD, and its architecture is based on the Texas Instruments Locosto chipset with an ARM core. It uses a customized, lightweight operating system nicknamed "Peekux" which is based on Nucleus RTOS by Mentor Graphics.

The Peek device's client firmware is C/C++ code written for the TI environment. Flavors of the Peek application for alternative operating environments from other RTOSes to BREW, to Windows, and to Android have all been spotted.

The core of Peek's real time mobile messaging platform is a cloud application. The environment is a conventional web application LAMP stack and relies in part on Amazon Web Services.

This cloud application has been deployed on many partner company devices since 2010.

== Reception ==
When Peek's first device launched, Time selected Peek as one of the 50 Best Inventions of the Year 2008. It was voted on Time.com as the #1 entry in the Gadget of the Year review.

Elizabeth Woyke of Forbes wrote, "At a time when the economy is melting and one-time bankers are on the street, [Peek] is betting customers will embrace the no-fuss simplicity—not to mention the modest price—of the Peek."

Tony Long, a journalist of Gadget Lab from Wired.com reviewed Peek as a device that "delivers peak email performance", and that using the device was "a breeze... even without operating instructions". He recommended the Peek device to those who would like access to their "e-mail from time to time, or if [they] believe that simplicity in all things is the key to life".

Wired magazine's December 2008 issue named Peek their #1 Gadget in their "Gear of the Year" review: "Not every gadget needs a carnival of features. Take the Peek, which tackles just a single task: mobile email. No phone, no browser, no camera—and no apologies. It won't satisfy convergence-rabid smartphone fetishists, but for the rest of the world (i.e., the majority of it), this one-trick pony is a godsend. In terms of looks, its slim profile stands up to the big boys. But the real treat is the interface."

After the Peek Pronto launch, International Design Magazine featured Peek Pronto on the cover of its 2009—and final—Annual Design Review.

TwitterPeek, on the other hand, met broad skepticism in the press. CNN.com 2009 Year in Review listed it as one of the top 10 biggest technology failures of 2009. Gizmodo went as far as to name TwitterPeek as one of the "50 Worst Gadgets of the Decade."

In 2010, Peek 9's enhanced features were met by Engadget's reviewers as "dancing with a full list of features" and "Peek 9 is nine times faster than Pronto, adds PeekMaps, weather, Twitter, and Facebook". TechCrunch's gadget reviewers said Peek 9 "brings a whole new level of cool to the not-a-smartphone device. It seems nearly everything is updated from the mail service to the hardware. It’s a mighty big update for Peek, but somehow all this goodness rings up for less than the previous generation—even the service plan is cheaper now."

On October 14, 2010, older Peek devices were disconnected from the network and Peek offered all its users a free, new replacement Peek 9 device to continue their service.

In 2011, Peek expanded their push email technology globally and is now part of their "Genius Cloud" platform for low-cost feature phones.

On January 24, 2012, GSMA nominated Peek for the best cloud technology.

On January 30, 2012, Peek users reported their devices abruptly stopped working, despite having paid USD200 for "lifelong service".

On February 1, 2012, Peek announced that it had terminated service for all its dedicated hardware in a move to cloud-only service. Peek's CEO, Amol Sarva stated that the abandoned products were "seriously old" and have reached their end of life, with only a "handful of users" left in the US. "Unfortunately, we cannot maintain the network forever for a few users, so that end time has come. The networks are changing standards, protocols etc., and the old units are now end-of-life. We have lots going with rapid adoption of our software by phone brands around the world, so Peek is flat out building for a number of platforms that our OEM customers are deploying like Android and Mediatek. We are not offering a Peek-made device to replace these old ones."

"Peek isn't in the hardware business anymore. Since last year, the company has been selling "the genius cloud", a series of services designed to make inexpensive feature phones smarter. Sarva notes that his product has just been nominated for the GSMA's Best Technology award which will be handed out at MWC later this month. He says that these services are the logical continuation of what Peek has been about since day one—"building smartphone features on ultra low-cost platforms"—and that they're making huge inroads with the countless Chinese manufacturers who sell unbranded phones in emerging markets, many of whom are "feeding off Nokia's carcass."
