= Dragonfire (novel) =

1987 spy thriller novel by Andrew Kaplan

- Author: Andrew Kaplan
- Publisher: Grand Central Publishing
- Publication date: January 1, 1987
- ISBN: 978-0-446-51377-7

Dragonfire is a 1987 spy thriller novel by American author Andrew Kaplan, published by Warner Books in hardcover and softcover editions. It was an international best-seller and a Main Selection of the Book of the Month Club in England.

== Plot summary ==
The novel follows CIA agent Sawyer as he embarks on a dangerous mission to prevent a Southeast Asian war. The mission takes him to the waterfront of Bangkok, where he is tasked with rescuing fellow agent Parker, who was previously captured. Along the way, Sawyer teams up with Suong, a beautiful and fierce Eurasian resistance fighter, and Toonsang, an opium trader with questionable allegiances. Together, they embark on a journey to find Parker which leads them to the forbidden hill country of the Golden Triangle.

In the Golden Triangle, they come face to face with Bhun Sa, the most powerful warlord in the opium trade. Sawyer takes him out, and he and Suong escape to abandoned temple ruins in Cambodia. To prove her loyalty, Suong tells Sawyer about her experience surviving the Killing Fields under the Khmer Rouge regime.

However, things take a dark turn when Sawyer is captured by the Khmer Rouge, and Suong's true identity as a war criminal is revealed. She is the sister of Pranh, the notorious Brother Number Two of the Killing Fields. Vietnamese forces ultimately attack the Khmer Rouge, which leads to Sawyer's freedom. He takes Suong captive, and after a final showdown with Vasnasong, the billionaire businessman behind the plot, Sawyer turns Suong over to the Cambodian resistance.

In an epilogue, the story reveals Suong's brutal death at the hands of her former victims while aboard a ship.

== Release details ==
- July 1987, Warner Books, hardcover, ISBN 0-446-51377-6
- April 1988, Warner Books, paperback, ISBN 0-446-34658-6
- 1988, Arrow Books, paperback, ISBN 0-09-947980-X
- 1987, Century Hutchinson, hardcover, ISBN 0-7126-1455-9
- 1990, Goldmann Verlag, paperback, ISBN 3-442-09257-4
- 1988, Bell (Greek), paperback
