= List of Sesame Workshop productions =

Sesame Workshop, formerly Children's Television Workshop (CTW), is an American nonprofit television production company. It has been involved in a variety of television series and films, in addition to international co-productions of Sesame Street that have been broadcast in over 140 countries.

== Productions ==
=== Television series ===
==== Sesame Street ====
The following series are based on or directly related to Sesame Street. Dubs of the original American version have been produced for international markets since 1971, but are not listed. Programs with guest appearances by Sesame Street characters that were not produced by Sesame Workshop, such as The Muppet Show and Between the Lions, are also excluded.

#	Year	Series	Country of origin	End year
1	1969	Sesame Street	United States	present
2	1972	Plaza Sésamo	United States; Latin America	present
3	1972	Vila Sésamo	Brazil	present
4	1972	Sesame Park	Canada	2001
5	1973	Sesamstraße	Germany	present
6	1975	Open Sesame	Worldwide (outside US)	2013
7	1976	Sesamstraat	Netherlands	present
8	1978	Barrio Sésamo	Spain	2000
9	1978	1, rue Sésame	France	1982
10	1979 (original); 2015 (reboot)	Iftah Ya Simsim	Kuwait (original); United Arab Emirates (reboot)	1989 (original); 2019 (reboot)
11	1981	Svenska Sesam	Sweden	1982
12	1983	Rechov Sumsum	Israel	2015
13	1984	Batibot	Philippines	2013
14	1986	Shalom Sesame	Israel	2011
15	1986	Susam Sokağı	Turkey	1991
16	1989	Rua Sésamo	Portugal	1994
17	1991	Sesam Stasjon	Norway	1999
18	1996	Ulica Sezamkowa	Poland	2001
19	1996	Ulitsa Sezam	Russia	2006
20	1998	Zhima Jie	China	2001
21	1998	Rechov Sumsum and Shara'a Simsim	Israel; Palestine	2000
22	1998 (original); 2017 (reboot)	Elmo's World	United States	2009 (original); present (reboot)
23	1999	Yeollyeola Seseomi Seuteuliteu	South Korea	2008
24	1999	Sesame English	Taiwan; China	2002
25	2000	Takalani Sesame	South Africa	present
26	2000	Alam Simsim	Egypt	2017
27	2002	Sippuray Sumsum	Israel	2006
28	2002	Hikayat Simsim	Palestine	2007
29	2002	Play with Me Sesame	United States	2007
30	2003	Hikayat Simsim	Jordan	2010
31	2003	Global Grover	United States	2008
32	2004	Rruga Sesam or Ulica Sezam	Kosovo	2006
33	2004	Play Along with Ollie	Australia	2011
34	2004	Sesame Street Japan	Japan	2007
35	2005	5, Rue Sésame	France	2007
36	2005	Sabai Sabai Sesame	Cambodia	2006
37	2005	Sisimpur	Bangladesh	present
38	2006	Galli Galli Sim Sim	India	2018
39	2007	Shara'a Simsim	Palestine	2012
40	2008	Jalan Sesama	Indonesia	2016
41	2008	Sesame Tree	Northern Ireland	2013
42	2008	Bert and Ernie's Great Adventures	United States; Italy	2013
43	2008	Kilimani Sesame	Tanzania	2009
44	2009	Abby's Flying Fairy School	United States	2012
45	2009	Sesamgade	Denmark	2011
46	2009	3, 2, 1 ¡Vamos!	Latin America	2012
47	2010	Eine Möhre für Zwei	Germany	present
48	2010	Super Grover 2.0	United States	2015
49	2010	Zhima Jie: Da Niao Kan Shijie	China	2012
50	2011	Sesame Square	Nigeria	2013
51	2011	Baghch-e-Simsim	Afghanistan	present
52	2011	Sim Sim Hamara	Pakistan	2012
53	2012	Sesame Street: Super Healthy Monsters	Spain; Worldwide	2012
54	2012	Elmo the Musical	United States	2016
55	2012	Fun Fun Elmo	China	2013
56	2013	Cookie's Crumby Pictures	United States	2015
57	2014	The Furchester Hotel	United Kingdom; United States	2017
58	2014	Chamki Ki Duniya	India	2016
59	2015	Sesame Amigos	United States	2018
60	2015	I Heart Elmo	India	2018
61	2016	Smart Cookies	United States	2017
62	2016	O Desafio do Elmo	Brazil	2017
63	2017 (television); 2018 (website)	Cookie Monster's Foodie Truck	United States	present
64	2018	Sesame Teret Teret	Ethiopia	2018
65	2018	Abby's Amazing Adventures	United States	2021
66	2019	Big Bird's Road Trip	United States	2020
67	2020	Sesame Sheeko Sheeko	Somalia	2021
68	2020	The Not-Too-Late Show with Elmo	United States	2021
69	2020	Ahlan Simsim	Syria	present
70	2020	Sesame Workshop India	India	present
71	2021	Sesame Hadithi Njoo	Kenya	present
72	2021	Elmo & Tango's Mysterious Mysteries	United States	present
73	2022	Mecha Builders	United States	2023
74	2022	Tokhnit He'írvkh Shel Elmo	Israel	present
75	2023	Sesame Street Nature Explorers	United States	present
76	2025	Tales from 123	United States	present

==== Other television series ====
Year	Production	Country of origin	Co-production(s)	Network	End year
1971	The Electric Company	United States		PBS	1977
1974	Feeling Good	United States		PBS	1975
1977	The Best of Families	United States		PBS	1977
1980	3-2-1 Contact	United States		PBS	1988
1987	Square One Television	United States		PBS	1992
1987	Mathnet	United States		PBS	1992
1988	Encyclopedia	United States		HBO	1989
1992	Ghostwriter	United States	BBC Television (seasons 1-2)	PBS; BBC Two	1995
1993	Cro	United States	Film Roman	ABC	1994
1996	Big Bag	United States; United Kingdom; France		Cartoon Network	1998
1997	The New Ghostwriter Mysteries	United States; Canada	Decode Entertainment	CBS	1997
1998	Mathmatazz	United States	The Dovetail Group; Scott Foresman; Addison-Wesley	Direct-to-video	1998
1999	Dragon Tales	United States; Canada	Columbia TriStar Television (seasons 1-2); Sony Pictures Television (season 3)	PBS (PBS Kids); CBC Television	2005
2001	Sagwa, the Chinese Siamese Cat	United States; Canada; China	CinéGroupe	PBS (PBS Kids); TVO	2002
2001	Sponk!	United States	Noggin LLC; Insight Productions	Noggin	2002
2001	Tiny Planets	United Kingdom; United States	Pepper's Ghost Productions Ltd.	Noggin	2006
2003	Out There	United States; Australia	Blink Films; Noggin LLC	Noggin	2004
2006	Pinky Dinky Doo	United States; United Kingdom; Latin America; Canada (season 1 only)	Cartoon Pizza; Abrams Gentile Entertainment (season 2); Keyframe Digital Productions (season 2)	Noggin	2011
2006	The Upside Down Show	United State; Australia	Blink Films; Noggin LLC	Noggin	2006
2008	Panwapa	United States	The Merrill Lynch Foundation	PBS Kids Sprout	2009
2009	The Electric Company	United States		PBS (PBS Kids Go)	2011
2018	Esme & Roy	United States; Canada	Nelvana	HBO/HBO Max; Treehouse TV	2021
2019	Helpsters	Worldwide	Big Indie Pictures; Monkey Boys Productions	Apple TV+	present
2019	Ghostwriter	Worldwide	Sinking Ship Entertainment	Apple TV+	present
2020	Helpsters: Help You	United States	Big Indie Pictures; Monkey Boys Productions	Apple TV+	2020
2023	Bea's Block	United States; United Kingdom	A Productions	Cartoon Network (Cartoonito)	present
2025	Charlotte's Web	United States; Canada	Guru Studio	HBO Max	2025

=== Theatrical feature films ===
Year	Production	Distributor	Production company	Country of origin
1985	Sesame Street Presents: Follow That Bird	Warner Bros. Pictures		United States
1999	The Adventures of Elmo in Grouchland	Sony Pictures Releasing	Columbia Pictures; Jim Henson Pictures	United States
TBA	Untitled third Sesame Street film	Netflix	Rideback	United States

=== TV films, specials, and documentaries ===
==== Sesame Street (1969–present) ====
Year	Production	Country of origin
1969	This Way to Sesame Street	United States
1973	Julie on Sesame Street	United States; United Kingdom
1974	Out to Lunch	United States
1975	The Grover Monster - Jean Marsh Cartoon Special	United States
1977	Sesame Street at Night?	United States
1977	Sesame Street Goes to Prison	United States
1978	Christmas Eve on Sesame Street	United States
1978	A Special Sesame Street Christmas	United States
1979	A Walking Tour of Sesame Street	United States
1979	Sesame Street in Puerto Rico	United States
1983	Don't Eat the Pictures	United States
1983	Big Bird in China	United States
1984	Big Bird in Australia	Australia
1988	Sesame Street, Special	United States
1989	Big Bird in Japan	United States; Japan
1989	Sesame Street: 20 and Still Counting	United States
1989	Sesame Street Around the World	United States
1989	The Sesame Street Experiment	United States
1990	Sing! Sesame Street Remembers Joe Raposo and His Music	United States
1991	Big Bird's Birthday or Let Me Eat Cake	United States
1993	Sesame Street: 25 Favorite Moments	United States
1993	Sesame Street Jam: A Musical Celebration	United States
1993	Sesame Street Stays Up Late!	United States
1994	Sesame Street All-Star 25th Birthday: Stars and Street Forever!	United States
1994	Basil Hears a Noise	United States; Canada
1996	Sesame Street Film Festival	United States
1996	Elmo Saves Christmas	United States
1998	Elmopalooza	United States
1998	The Rosie O'Donnell Show on Sesame Street	United States
1999	CinderElmo	United States
1999	Sesame Street Unpaved	United States
2000	The Greatest TV Moments: Sesame Street Music A-Z	United States
2001	A&E Biography: Sesame Street	United States
2003	Sesame Street 4-D Movie Magic	United States; Japan
2004	Sesame Street: The Street We Live On	United States
2005	Sesame Street: All-Star Alphabet	United States
2006	The World According to Sesame Street	United States
2006	When Parents Are Deployed	United States
2007	Elmo's Christmas Countdown	United States
2008	One World, One Sky: Big Bird's Adventure	United States; China
2009	Coming Home	United States
2009	Families Stand Together	United States
2010	When Families Grieve	United States
2011	Being Elmo: A Puppeteer's Journey	United States
2011	Growing Hope Against Hunger	United States
2014	I Am Big Bird: The Caroll Spinney Story	United States
2015	The Cookie Thief	United States
2016	Once Upon a Sesame Street Christmas	United States
2017	The Magical Wand Chase	United States
2018	When You Wish Upon A Pickle	United States
2019	Sesame Street's 50th Anniversary Celebration	United States
2020	Sesame Street: 50 Years and Still Sunny!	United States
2020	Sesame Street: Elmo's Playdate	Asia; North America; Oceania; United Kingdom
2020	Street Gang	United States
2020	The Monster at the End of This Story	United States
2020	Monster Meditations (with Headspace)	United States
2021	Furry Friends Forever: Elmo Gets a Puppy	United States
2021	See Us Coming Together	United States
2022	The Nutcracker: Starring Elmo & Tango	United States
2023	Elmo & Tango Holiday Helpers	United States

Sesame Street Muppets have appeared in cameos in various feature films, including The Muppet Movie (1979), The Great Muppet Caper (1981), The Muppets Take Manhattan (1984), and Night at the Museum: Battle of the Smithsonian (2009). These productions, however, were not produced by Sesame Workshop. Also excluded from this list are Julie on Sesame Street (1973) and A Special Sesame Street Christmas (1978)—while both featured the same elements and characters of Sesame Street, these specials were not produced by Sesame Workshop.

==== Other TV films, and documentaries ====
Year	Production	Country of origin
1979	The Lion, the Witch and the Wardrobe	United States
1981	Sign On!	United States
1984	The House of Dies Drear	United States
1991	The Wish That Changed Christmas	United States
2003	Dragon Tales: Let's Start a Band!	United States
2005	PBS Kids: Big Big Friend Day	United States
2021	Through Our Eyes	United States
2025	Charlotte's Web	United States
