= Sesame Street: Ready, Set, Grover! =

2011 video game

- North American box art for Wii, featuring the Grover cover, and the main characters Elmo, Abby Cadabby, Grover and two monsters
- Developer(s): Griptonite Games
- Publisher(s): Warner Bros. Interactive Entertainment
- Platform(s): Wii, Nintendo DS
- Release: NA: August 2, 2011; AU: August 17, 2011
- Genre(s): Adventure, edutainment
- Mode(s): Single-player, multiplayer

Sesame Street: Ready, Set, Grover! is a Sesame Street video game that was released on August 2, 2011. The game is available for the Wii and Nintendo DS and promotes healthy advice, as part of Sesame Workshop's Healthy Habits for Life project. Unlike 2010's Cookie's Counting Carnival and Elmo's A-to-Zoo Adventure, the game was not released on Microsoft Windows.

== Gameplay ==
In the game, Grover sets out to create a series of challenges designed to help his friends get exercise. There are four locations featured in the game: the Street, the Garden, the Park, and the Pond; each location contains five challenges to play through.
