= Vila Sésamo =

Brazilian version of the American children's television series Sesame Street

- Also known as: Sésamo (2016–2022)
- Genre: Children's television series; Educational; Sketch comedy; Puppetry; Animation
- Created by: Cláudio Petraglia; José Bonifácio de Oliveira Sobrinho
- Based on: Sesame Street
- Opening theme: Alegria da vida by Paulo Sérgio Valle (1972–1977, 2019); Gergelim by Vanessa de Mata (2007–2016); Sésamo (2016–present)
- Ending theme: Alegria da vida (instrumental) (1972–1977); Gergelim (instrumental) (2007–2016); Sésamo (instrumental) (2016–present)
- Country of origin: Brazil
- Original language: Portuguese

Production
- Producer: Jayme Leite de Godoy Camargo
- Production companies: Children's Television Workshop/Sesame Workshop (1972–1974; 2007–present); TV Cultura (1972–1974; 2007–2017); Central Globo de Produções (1972–1977)

Original release
- Network: TV Cultura (1972–2017); Rede Globo (1972–1977); TV Rá-Tim-Bum (2007–2016)
- Release: 12 October 1972 – present

Related
- Sesame Street (original series); Plaza Sésamo

Vila Sésamo (formerly known as Sésamo from 2016 to 2022) is a Brazilian co-production of the first preschool television programme Sesame Street. As of 2009 it airs on TV Rá-Tim-Bum. As of 2016, similar to Plaza Sésamo (the Spanish version of the kids' show), new seasons air under the title Sésamo. The series debuted on October 12, 1972, moving from TV Cultura to SKY Play on June 25, 2020.

== History ==
Sésamo is the Brazilian version of the American educational children's show, Sesame Street. Originally airing in Brazil from 1972 to 1977, São Paulo based Brazilian broadcaster TV Cultura and Sesame Workshop (the non-profit educational organization behind Sesame Street, formerly known as the Children's Television Workshop) returned the show to Brazilian airwaves with a new Sésamo branded block of programming in October 2007. The show had a participation in SBT in October 2019 appearing in one of the sketches during children's day. The dubbing resumed and moved to SKY Brasil in June 2020.

=== The Co-production Era: 1972–1977, 2007–2019 ===
The show premiered in 1972, broadcast by TV Cultura and TV Globo. In this phase, they fulfilled all the norms of the American Sesame Street. Also most of the material was dubbed, and the presentation of thematic charts in repetitive order. The puppet characters in the series, created within Brazil, included the following: Garibaldo, a seven-foot tall blue bird equivalent to Big Bird; Gugu, a hairy green, yellow (plus other colors) Grouch. They lived in the street with Gabriela, Juca, Ana Maria and Seu Almeida. At the time, there was no color television in Brazil, so the show was broadcast in black and white. It was the first international version of the show.

But it was in 1973 that the two channels started the second phase. Vila Sésamo became entirely nationalized; with new cast members, new music and new scripts. Two new Muppet characters were introduced – Funga Funga, a giant, red elephant, and Zé Das Latas, the street's resident robot. In 1974, TV Cultura decided to stop financing the project. Now it was up to TV Globo, who changed the format to make it more national. A larger set was built for the renewed Vila Sésamo, and more children took part in the show. Assisting in the format change was José Bonifácio Coutinho Nogueira, who had previously worked with TV Cultura.

The final phase started in 1975, but lasted only until 1977. More characters and actors were added during the show's final seasons. All of the puppets were created by local Brazilian designers, with no known involvement from the Muppet Workshop. All original Sesame Street material was dropped, except for the Bert and Ernie sketches.

The series was successful, but was canceled due to overwhelming financial costs.

On October 29, 2007, TV Cultura launched a new Vila Sésamo. Rather than a full co-production, the series featured new host segments featuring Garibaldo (Big Bird) and a new Muppet monster named Bel. The package consists of Portuguese-dubbed episodes of Elmo's World, Play With Me Sesame, and Global Grover, plus selections from the US Sesame Street and Sesame English. Seventy-eight new Brazilian live-action and animated inserts fill out the block.

In December 2016, TV Cultura has been renewed by "Sésamo", Rather than a full co-production, the series featured stars by Elmo, Grover, Come-Come (Cookie Monster), Abby Cadabby and Bel (the only carryover from Vila Sésamo) in framing scenes. Each episode features many short-form segments, including "Bert and Ernie's Great Adventures", "Abby's Flying Fairy School", "Elmo's World", "Elmo the Musical", "Super Grover 2.0", "Cookie's Crumby Pictures" and "O Desafio do Elmo". Episodes also feature appearances by local celebrities.

On October 5, 2019, Garibaldo (Big Bird), Come Come (Cookie Monster), Elmo and Abby Cadabby appeared in the SBT studio's park to film a hidden camera prank directed by Jefferson Candido insert for Programa Silvio Santos, following the American event known as 50 Years and Counting. Normally they don't have many pranks for kids in this show, but because of Sesame Street's 50th birthday they got permission to feature the main characters for the Brazilian version of the show 123 Sésamo. This is because the show in Brazil ended and this would be a good way to make the young public familiar again with the Muppets and hopefully get enough to restart the show. For this prank, a whole farm was created in the style of the former show with live animals, hiding places for the cameras and a new nest for Garibaldo (Big Bird). It took one day of filming with 17 kids and the video aired on October 13 for Brazil's Special Day for the Child and will air again at Christmas. At the end of the day, every child got an Elmo or Cookie plush as a souvenir after they bid farewell to the Muppets.

=== The Dubbing Era: 2003–present ===
Eighteen years after the show went off the air, the Hopi Hari theme park in Brazil opened a Vila Sésamo themed area in 1998 (which has since closed), and the original series was released on DVD in 2003. Parents who grew up watching the show when they were young look forward to sharing the experience with their children.

In June 2020, the series returned when SKY Play aired the half-hour special Elmo's Playdate – produced in response to the COVID-19 pandemic in Brazil.

The original name was returned and copied to dub episodes for the HBO Max era.

== Characters ==
=== 1972–1977 ===
- Garibaldo ( Laerte Morrone), a giant, shy blue bird; he was the series' equivalent to Big Bird.
- Gugu, a green Muppet monster with a blue nose and orange cheeks. Similar to Oscar the Grouch. "Gugu" is sometimes used to refer to Oscar the Grouch in select Portuguese dubs of Sesame Street. Oscar the Grouch is also called "Gugu" in the 2007 revival.
- Beto and Ênio, Bert and Ernie's names in the Portuguese-dubbed version.
- Juca (Armando Bógus), a toy maker who taught children about his craft.
- Ana Maria (Sônia Braga), a teacher and Juca's cousin.
- Gabriela (Aracy Balabanian), wife of Juca
- Funga-funga, a red Muppet elephant who didn't like how others looked at him. He could have been an equivalent to Mr. Snuffleupagus but he was not written to be an imaginary character. Mr. Snuffleupagus is referred to as "Funga-Funga" in the 2007 revival and other Portuguese dubbed projects.

=== 2007–2013 ===
- Garibaldo (Fernando Gomes), unlike the previous version where he was the independent resident counterpart to Big Bird, Garibaldo has actually became the American Big Bird himself but using the name "Garibaldo" as his Portuguese translated name making it consistent with the use of "Garibaldo" as his name in most Portuguese dubs of Sesame Street as well as making Vila Sésamo the second International Co-Production of Sesame Street after Zhima Jie to have a direct localized version of Big Bird rather than a separate equivalent. Big Bird appears as a host on the local segments with Bel who serves as his best friend in the segments.
- Bel (Magda Crudelli), imaginative, outgoing, pink three-year-old monster. She is Big Birds best friend in the 2007 series.
- Beto and Ênio (Marcelo Torreão), Bert and Ernie's names in the Portuguese-dubbed version. They are mentioned a few times by Garibaldo and Bel, but they only appear in segments of the American version.
- Elmo (Alexandre Moreno), the red monster from the original American skits, at Bel's same age. He only appear in segments of the American version.
- Come-Come (Luiz Carlos Persy), Cookie Monster's name in the Portuguese-dubbed version. He only appears in segments of the American version.
- Grover (Mauro Ramos), the cute furry blue monster friend also from the domestic Sesame Street segments. He only appears in segments of the American version.
- Sivan (Neusa de Souza), a little girl who is in a wheelchair from Rechov Sumsum, the Israeli co-production of Sesame Street and Shalom Sesame.

=== 2016–2019 ===
- Bel (Thais Carvalho), imaginative, outgoing, pink/purple three-year-old monster.
- Beto and Ênio (André Milano), Bert and Ernie's names in the Portuguese-dubbed version.
- Elmo (Kelly Guidotti), the red monster from the original American skits, Bel's same age and best friend.
- Abby Cadabby (Marilice Cosenza), a fairy who makes magic.
- Come-Come (Paulo Henrique), Cookie Monster's name in the Portuguese-dubbed version.
- Grover (André Milano), the cute furry blue monster friend also from the domestic Sesame Street segments.
- Mãe (Kelly Guidotti), Elmo's mother who helped Elmo.
- Louie (Jonathan Faria), Elmo's father who helped Elmo.
- Lily (Thais Carvalho), a tiger from Zhima Jie, the Chinese co-production of Sesame Street.
- Chamki (Thais Carvalho), a six-year-old girl from Galli Galli Sim Sim, the Indian co-production of Sesame Street.
- Lola (Marilice Consenza), a pink monster from Sésamo, the Latin American co-production of Sesame Street.

=== 2019 special ===
- Farmer (Paulo Porto), who works on a farm.
- Garibaldo (Falcon Mantovanni), just like the 2007 version, he is Big Bird.
- Elmo (Kelly Guidotti), the red monster from the original American skits, at Bel's same age.
- Abby Cadabby (Marilice Cosenza), a fairy who makes magic.
- Come-Come (Paulo Henrique), Cookie Monster's name in the Portuguese-dubbed version.

== Program segments ==
- Letra do Dia (In English: Letter of the Day)

A segment where Big Bird has to find things with letters of the alphabet.

- Vamos Contar com a Bel (In English: Let's Count with Bel)

A segment where Bel needs to find objects in a pool of colorful dice.

- Elmo's World (O Mundo de Elmo)

A segment where Elmo learns many fun things.

- Global Grover (As Viagens de Grover)

A segment where Grover talks about his trips to other countries.

- Play With Me Sesame (Brinque Comigo Sésamo)

A segment where the characters Ernie, Bert, Grover and Prairie Dawn play and have fun, as well as showcase retro Sesame Street clips and songs dubbed in Portuguese.
