= Sesame Street in Japan =

Japanese edition of Sesame Street TV series

The American children's television series Sesame Street (Japanese: セサミストリート, Hepburn: Sesamisutorīto) has a long history in Japan, airing for three decades as a dubbed program, and recently restarting as a local co-production. There was also a manga published from 1990 to 1992 unrelated to this.

Sesame Street also has an official Japanese YouTube channel that was made during 2014. It uploads Sesame Street content, dubbed in Japanese.

== Japanese dub (1971–2004, 2020) ==
Sesame Street has been one of NHK's most successful children's programs and one of the first to be imported from overseas. Sesame Street first aired on November 8, 1971, but was taken off the network in the early 1980s. It resumed from 1988 until the end of March 2004, when production on a local adaptation was announced, which NHK refused to be involved in. While Sesame Street is primarily designed for preschool children, teenagers and adults watched the program as a guide to learning English, though much later on a dubbed version was available.

NHK also co-produced the 1988 PBS special, Big Bird in Japan.

The original show aired on NHK Educational TV until April 2004. The dub was also formerly aired on Animax and Disney Channel.

After 16 years, Sesame Street: Elmo's Playdate was aired on May 16, 2020, 1 year later, the Japanese dub became a Japanese subtitled version of the franchise once in a second time using audio description.

== Japanese co-production ==
=== Production ===
In November 2003, the brand's master license was acquired by Asatsu-DK and We've from Sesame Workshop. Sesame Street Partners Japan was founded the following year. Along with the original partners, Japan Keizai Company, TV Tokyo Broadband, and Odyssey Communications were added to the "consortium."

The partnership initiated development of a new series, to focus on literacy and Japanese culture, with a curriculum developed by local educators.

A local co-production, began airing weekly starting on 10 October 2004 on TV Tokyo and its affiliates.

The series was cancelled in 2007.

=== Content ===
The show focused on nature, imagination, independent thinking, and financial literacy, as well as ethics, interacting with friends, and environmental issues.

The series is in Japanese, except for regularly included English lesson segments, which were about three minutes long.

=== Characters ===
At the start of the show, four new Muppet characters were introduced: Teena, an outgoing pink monster who likes to sing and dance; Mojabo, a happy go lucky green and purple monster who likes to exercise; Pierre, a blue-and-yellow frog; and Arthur, a little yellow bird. In 2006, two new Muppets were added to the series—Grorie, a female orange Grover-like monster, and Meg, a Japanese girl. A few established Sesame Street characters appear in new segments, most notably Elmo, Big Bird, and Cookie Monster, who in the Japanese series has a propensity to laugh out loud and is used heavily to deal with emotional issues.

While Sesame Workshop is generally on the forefront of cultural understanding when creating the co-productions, this is apparently not the case with the Japanese version. One script included a plot line where a child trips during a race at a school sports festival. Sesame Workshop insisted the other characters must help him up, something the local producers insisted was unrealistic in modern Japanese culture.

=== Reception ===
An article in The Japan Times reported that the show was suffering from low ratings in its early months: "Viewers are complaining about the differences in the characters' voices compared with the NHK-aired version and about the exclusive use of Japanese."

== Cast and crew ==
=== Muppet cast ===
- Elmo (エルモ, Erumo): Kenta Matsumoto
- Big Bird (ビッグバード, Biggubādo): Satoshi Tsuruoka
- Cookie Monster (クッキーモンスター, Kukkīmonsutā): Kei Kikuchi
- Tina (ティーナ, Tiina) and Pierre (ピエール, Piieru): Rena Mizushiro
- Mojabo (モジャボ, Mojabo): Hideki Tanaka
- Arthur (アーサー, Aasaa) and Glory (グローリー, Gurorie): Kaori Takeda
- Meg (メグ, Megu): Ayako Iguchi
- Yan Monster: Aiko Yamada

=== Human cast ===
- Ari Ota
- Hirotarō Yamada
- Sanae Morisawa
- Nana Koizumi
- Dario Toda

=== Crew ===
- Director: Hajime Matsuki
- Producer: Yoshikazu Beniya
- Editor: Jonok Viluk
- Scripter: Donny Osmand
- Sound effect crew: Joel Nomi, Kilsa Mijuski, Limno Heisnjo
