= When You Wish Upon a Pickle: A Sesame Street Special =

2018 American television special

- Written by: Joe Fallon; Ron Halsey; Ken Scarborough
- Directed by: Jack Jameson
- Country of origin: United States
- Original language: English

Production
- Running time: 48 minutes

Original release
- Network: HBO
- Release: November 10, 2018

When You Wish Upon a Pickle: A Sesame Street Special is a 48-minute Sesame Street HBO television special with special guest stars Blake Lively and Amanda Seyfried. The special was a co-production with Shout Factory and Sesame Workshop. The special received a Primetime Emmy Award for Outstanding Children's Program at the 71st Primetime Emmy Awards and was also nominated for Best Voice-Over for Eric Jacobson for his performances as Bert, Grover, and Oscar the Grouch.

The special's director, Jack Jameson, received a Directors Guild of America award for Outstanding Directing in Children's Programs at the 71st Annual Ceremony in 2018.

== Synopsis ==
A sentient anthropomorphized pickle with magical powers arrives on Sesame Street to grant wishes to Elmo, Abby Cadabby, Bert, etc.

== Cast ==
- Chris Knowings as Chris Robinson
- Suki Lopez as Nina
- Blake Lively as delivery worker
- Amanda Seyfried as Natalie Neptune
- Ilana Glazer in an uncredited cameo as Mr. Noodle's sister, Miss Noodle

=== Muppet performers ===
- Leslie Carrara-Rudolph as Abby Cadabby
- Ryan Dillon as Elmo
- Eric Jacobson as Bert, Grover, Oscar the Grouch, Guy Smiley
- Peter Linz as Ernie and Herry Monster
- David Rudman as Cookie Monster
- Matt Vogel as Big Bird, Count von Count, Mr. Johnson, The Wish Pickle

=== Background Muppets ===
Two-Headed Monster, Julia, Rosita, Rudy, Gladys the Cow, Chickens, Baby Bear, Jacket, Telly Monster, Zoe, Mel, Honker, Dinger, Chip and Dip, Mother Goose, Anything Muppets, AM Monsters
