= Sesame Street Stays Up Late! =

- Written by: Lou Berger
- Directed by: Chuck Vinson
- Starring: Caroll Spinney; Martin P. Robinson; Kevin Clash; Fran Brill; Jerry Nelson; Frank Oz; Lily Tomlin; Jim Kroupa
- Music by: Stephen J. Lawrence
- Country of origin: United States
- Original language: English

Production
- Executive producer: Nina Elias-Bamberger
- Producer: Christine Woods
- Cinematography: Victor Sosa (director of photography)
- Editors: Karyn Finley Thompson; John R. Tierney (videotape editor)
- Running time: 56 minutes
- Production company: Children's Television Workshop

Original release
- Network: PBS
- Release: December 29, 1993

Sesame Street Stays Up Late! is a 1993 Sesame Street New Year's Eve musical television special with guest appearances of characters from the international versions of Sesame Street. The special was produced by the Children's Television Workshop in association with Norddeutscher Rundfunk, Israel Educational Television, NHK, Televisa S.A. de C.V., Norsk Rikskringkasting and Radiotelevisão Portuguesa, the respective broadcasters of the respective international co-productions featured in the special.

It aired on December 29, 1993, on PBS, and released on December 31, 1994, on VHS. It also marked Steve Whitmire's first official onscreen performance as Ernie.

== Plot ==
It is New Year's Eve on Sesame Street and everyone is planning on celebrating. Big Bird sees all the adults going to their own parties, while Gina and Savion are helping the kids hold their own party on the street. Meanwhile, Baby Bear doesn't know when New Year's Eve happens for real, Snuffy is fast asleep, and Telly Monster becomes upset that the current year ending. The others show him that the New Year is celebrated all over the world, so he calms a bit.

How New Year's traditions are celebrated is through the Monster News Network, hosted by Elmo. Throughout the special, segments featuring Sesame characters from different co-productions around the world, beginning with Mexico, represented by Rosita and Elmo's Cousin Pepe, who show how to celebrate using piñatas. Zoe questions how they are going to know when it's midnight, but then one of the kids mentions that her parents went to Times Square the previous year and saw a Ball being dropped from a tall building at midnight. When Big Bird hears this, he knows exactly who to find, eventually finding Wolfgang the Seal to balance a beach ball that Big Bird found. Savion then questions how Wolfgang will know about what exact time midnight will be, and then Count von Count arrives to help everybody out, counting down the seconds to the New Year.

Oscar the Grouch tries to call his family, but Telly interrupts Oscar and panics with him about the new year, Oscar doesn't want to be bothered, but he explains to Telly that he does this because it's tradition every New Year's Eve. Telly starts to think maybe he shouldn't worry, but Oscar soon comes up with false claims about it, and sends Telly into a panic, as Telly starts a campaign to prevent the new year from coming to Sesame Street. Oscar gets a hold the operator, Ernestine (Lily Tomlin), only to be informed that all the lines are busy. Elmo then shows off another way of celebrating, with Tita from Rua Sésamo representing the country of Portugal, and showing how they use grapes to celebrate. Afterwards, as everyone is trying to wake up Snuffy, they are interrupted by a figure wearing a coat, sunglasses and a white beard, claiming to be part of the "Department of Celebrations and Parties" and who deems Sesame Street is in a "No Party Zone". However, the figure turns out to be a disguised Telly, trying to stop the New Year from arriving, Prairie Dawn, who interviewed Telly described it as another big shot exposed.

Oscar manages to get in contact with his mother as well as his Uncle Hank until the operator decides to take a "breaky-wakey". Prairie Dawn informs the viewers that the countdown continues on Sesame Street, while Elmo shows off how Japan celebrates the New Year, represented by his cousin Elmo-noske, who shows how everyone makes cards for each other, helps to make rice cakes, and, during New Year's Day, plays home-made badminton. Meanwhile, Telly tries to temp Wolfgang into eating a fish so he can steal the ball, but this plot fails as well. The Count reminds Telly that the big moment is getting closer, which results in Telly deciding to hide. Next, Elmo showcases how Israel celebrated the New Year three months ago, represented by Moishe Oofnik (here referred to as "Oofnik the Grouch") and Kippi Ben Kippod from Rechov Sumsum.

Telly goes missing, and Gina and Savion try to look for him. Elmo showcases how Germany celebrates, represented by Tiffy, Samson and Finchen from Sesamstrasse. They showcase how they dress up and go collecting treats around houses, similar to Halloween. As the seconds go down and down, Gina still can't find Telly, and Big Bird still can't wake up Snuffy. However, Snuffy does wake up for a sec to tell Big Bird what he's dreaming about, being at a party with Big Bird. Little does he realize that his dream IS coming true. The last country Elmo showcases the New Year on Monster News Network is in Norway, represented by Max Mekker, Alfa and Bjarne Betjent from Sesam Stasjon, as they show the New Year's skiing tournament, and then travel in a cart. In-between, Grover gets injured from coming back on skis and decides to take a break at the hot tub.

A parade of kids and Big Bird pass by the sleeping Snuffy as 73 seconds pass by. Oscar is finally able to connect the rest of his family. After they all shout "phooey" to each other, they hang up, but the operator states that she's off at 12:00 if anyone's interested. Gina finds Telly inside Finders Keepers, and tells him that nothing bad is going to happen and that the New Year is quite fun. Gina also tells him about New Year's Resolutions, and Telly soon quirks up hearing about everything he'll miss and decides his resolution will be to not be scared of everything.

Everyone reaches to Around the Corner, with Prairie Dawn reporting, the adults returning from their party, Snuffy waking up, and Elmo and his crew coming outside as everybody does the countdown and Wolfgang removes the ball in slow motion. When the ball drops to the ground, everyone cheers and welcomes in the new year. Baby Bear finally is able to know that is the New Year and finally manages to call it out. Meanwhile, Telly is amazed that everyone is still here and happily joins the celebration with everyone else. Big Bird soon calls out to everyone and makes a wish that everyone around the world should be friends as he eats the grape while Carlo wishes for peace and happiness everywhere and sing "Faces That I Love".

The special ends with everybody shouting "Happy New Year!" as they continue to celebrate, even Slimey, much to Oscar's chagrin as he slowly sinks back into his trash can. Finally, the words, "THE END" appear on the screen and Cookie Monster eats one of the letters as he exclaims, "Me love credits!"

== Cast ==
=== Live-action cast ===
- Alison Bartlett as Gina
- Savion Glover as Savion
- Linda Bove as Linda
- Ruth Buzzi as Ruthie
- Annette Calud as Celina
- Emilio Delgado as Luis
- Angel Jemmott as Angela
- Loretta Long as Susan
- Sonia Manzano as Maria
- Bob McGrath as Bob
- Roscoe Orman as Gordon
- Jou Jou Papailler as Jamal
- Lily Tomlin as Ernestine the Telephone Operator (based on her role from Rowan & Martin's Laugh-In)
- Carlo Alban as Carlo
- Tarah Schaeffer as Tarah
- Olivia Oguma as Olivia (from New York City)

=== Muppets performers ===
- Caroll Spinney as Big Bird and Oscar the Grouch
- Steve Whitmire as Ernie
- Frank Oz as Bert, Cookie Monster, Grover and Uncle Hank
- Jerry Nelson as The Count
- Fran Brill as Zoe, Roxie Marie, and Prairie Dawn
- Kevin Clash as Elmo, Wolfgang the Seal, Cousin Pepe, Elmo-noske, Bjarne Betjent (voice) and the Announcer
- Jim Martin as Max Mekker (voice)
- Joey Mazzarino as MNN Logo Purple Monster, Grouches and AM Monsters
- Carmen Osbahr as Rosita
- Pam Arciero as Alfa (voice), Telly Monster (assistant)
- Martin P. Robinson as Telly, Snuffy, Slimey and Mrs. Grouch
- David Rudman as Baby Bear, MNN Logo Orange Monster, Grouches and AM Monsters
- Bryant Young as rear end of Snuffy
- Ivy Austin as Tita (voice)

Additional Muppets performed by Jim Kroupa, Peter Linz, Rick Lyon, Stephanie D'Abruzzo, Noel MacNeal and Alison Mork.

=== International Muppet performers ===
- Gilles Ben-David as Moishe Oofnik (referred to as Oofnik the Grouch)
- Geir Børresen as Max Mekker
- Hanne Dahle as Alfa
- Uta Delbridge as Finchen
- Klaus Esch as Samson
- Åsmund Huser as Bjarne Betjent
- Paula Pais as Tita
- Marita Stolze as Tiffy
- Sarai Tzuriel as Kippi Ben Kippod
- Christine Stoesen as Py

== Songs ==
- "We're Gonna Stay Up Late and Party"
- "Mexican Folk Song"
- "Oshogatsu"
- "Bashana Haba'ah"
- "Rummel Pot Song"
- "It's New Year's Eve"
- "New Year Chorale for Six Grouches"
- "Faces That I Love"

== Home media/digital releases ==
The special was originally released on VHS by Random House Home Video in 1994, where it was retitled as Sesame Street Celebrates Around the World, which is what all rereleases of the special would use. The VHS was later reissued by Sony Wonder in 1996.

Sony Wonder released the special on DVD in 2004, and was reissued by Genius Entertainment and Warner Home Video in 2008 and 2010, respectively.

The 2017 Amazon Video digital download release, reinstated the special's original title of Sesame Street Stays Up Late.
