= Sesame Street: Elmo's Playdate =

- Based on: Sesame Street by: Joan Ganz Cooney; Lloyd Morrisett
- Directed by: Matt Vogel
- Starring: See cast
- Theme music composer: J. P. Rende
- Opening theme: Elmo's Playdate Theme
- Ending theme: "Sing" by Joe Raposo
- Composer: J. P. Rende
- Country of origin: United States
- Original language: English

Production
- Executive producers: Melissa Dino; Benjamin Lehman; Jodi Nussbaum; Nick Florez; Ken Scarborough
- Running time: 25 minutes
- Production company: Sesame Workshop

Original release
- Network: HBO; PBS Kids
- Release: April 14, 2020

Related
- Elmo's Playdate: Scavenger Hunt

Sesame Street: Elmo's Playdate is a 2020 television special which was produced as an extension of Sesame Workshop's Caring for Each Other initiative in response to the COVID-19 pandemic in the United States. The special follows Elmo and other Sesame Street characters having a virtual playdate, along with a few celebrity guests. HBO and WarnerMedia's parent company, AT&T, was the program's sole sponsor, with UnitedHealthcare sponsoring the PBS Kids broadcast.

A second special, Elmo's Playdate: Scavenger Hunt, aired on August 6, 2020.

== Synopsis ==
The television special follows Elmo (with the help of his father Louie) as he has a virtual playdate with Big Bird, Grover, Cookie Monster, Abby Cadabby, and some of his other friends over at Sesame Street via video conferencing, together with a few celebrity guests, figuring out new ways to play together considering the limitations of social distancing. The show also highlights the roles of emergency medical technicians, doctors, and other everyday heroes who are helping people throughout the COVID-19 public health crisis.

== Cast ==
=== Sesame Street Muppet Performers ===
- Jennifer Barnhart as Zoe
- Tyler Bunch as Louie
- Leslie Carrara-Rudolph as Abby Cadabby
- Frankie Cordero as Rudy
- Stephanie D'Abruzzo as Prairie Dawn
- Ryan Dillon as Elmo
- Eric Jacobson as Bert and Grover
- Peter Linz as Ernie
- Carmen Osbahr as Rosita
- Martin P. Robinson as Telly Monster
- David Rudman as Cookie Monster
- Matt Vogel as Big Bird and Count von Count

=== Humans ===
- Alan Muraoka as Alan
- Suki Lopez as Nina

=== Special guest stars ===
- Tracee Ellis Ross as Herself
- Lin-Manuel Miranda as Himself
- Taye Diggs as Himself (archived performance of "Let's Go Driving" with Elmo)
- Anne Hathaway as Herself

== Broadcast ==
The special was broadcast at 7pm EDT on HBO and PBS Kids and was simulcast on WarnerMedia-owned networks: TBS, TNT, truTV, HBO Latino, Cartoon Network, and Boomerang. It also re-aired on select PBS stations across the United States.

In Canada, the special was simulcast on April 15 at 4pm on Corus Entertainment networks Global, Teletoon, YTV, Cartoon Network, and Treehouse TV. on Singapore, the special was broadcast on Mediacorp's Channel 5 through its children's programming block Okto. It aired on April 19, following the network's telecast of One World: Together at Home.

In the United Kingdom (where Elmo and Cookie Monster appeared as characters in spin-off shows, Sesame Tree and The Furchester Hotel), the special was broadcast on CBeebies on May 8, and repeated on BBC One on May 30 at 1.15pm, marking the first time Sesame Street has been broadcast on the BBC's main domestic television network.

In Japan, the special was broadcast on NHK Educational TV on May 17.

In Australia, the special was broadcast on ABC Kids on May 30.
