= Adam Sandler (street performer) =

American criminal (born c. 1963)

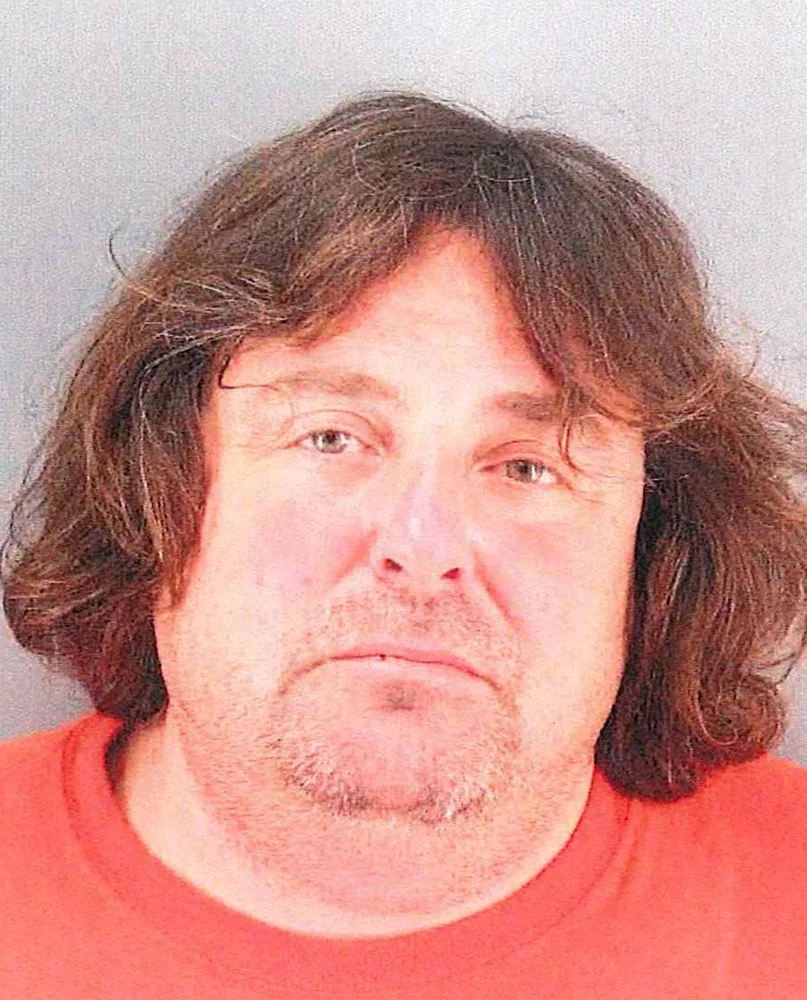
- Mugshot of Sandler in 2013
- Born: Danny Mark Sandler; 1962 or 1963 (age 63–64); Ashland, Oregon, U.S.
- Education: University of Oregon

Adam Sandler (born Danny Mark Sandler; c. 1963), often referred to as Evil Elmo, is an American costumed performer and former pornographer who has gained notoriety since 2012 for harassing bystanders in multiple cities in the United States while dressed as various characters from Sesame Street, such as Elmo and Cookie Monster.

== Early life and education ==
Sandler was born c. 1963 as Danny Mark Sandler and is from Ashland, Oregon. In 1984 he survived a 40-foot (12 m) fall from a highway bridge and was found on the ground six hours later without serious injury. He received an undergraduate degree from the University of Oregon.

== Cambodian web pornography ==
On November 7, 1999, Sandler was deported from Cambodia for operating a pornography website called "Welcome to Rape Camp". He was referred to by The Cambodia Daily as "Cambodia’s first known Internet pornographer". The deportation came after Sandler was arrested in Phnom Penh for alleged violations of human trafficking and pornography laws described in a complaint filed by Mu Sochua, Cambodia's Minister of Women and Veterans' Affairs. According to The Cambodia Daily, Sandler said he studied the law carefully and specifically untied performers during certain sexual acts to comply with regulation.

The website was the subject of an academic paper published in the Journal of Sexual Aggression, with the author noting that viewers were encouraged to "humiliate these Asian sex slaves to your hearts content" and that viewers could pay to have their preferred bondage acts performed on the women. Sandler claimed that the women featured on the site were not harmed, but told the Associated Press that it would be a good thing if the site was perceived as encouraging violence against American women, because "I hate those bitches". He blamed an ongoing divorce for his misogynistic attitudes. As a result of the scandal, he changed his first name to Adam (sharing a name with American actor Adam Sandler).

Sandler has stated the goal of the website was to fund an outsourcing company specializing in educational media.

== Costumed harassment ==
In 2012, Sandler was videotaped shouting antisemitic and xenophobic remarks while walking around New York City's Central Park dressed as the Sesame Street character Elmo. Despite this, Sandler has publicly denied being antisemitic and says that he is actually Jewish. That year, he was also charged with felony extortion against the Girl Scouts of the USA, for whom he briefly worked. Sandler threatened that if he was not paid $2 million, he would tell the public that the Girl Scouts organization arranged for sexual encounters between campers and adult men. He was convicted and sentenced to one year in prison.

In 2013, also dressed as Elmo, Sandler threatened to rip out the throat of a female San Francisco shopkeeper who had put up a sign saying the costumed man was not an employee of her store. He was arrested, jailed, and charged with being a public nuisance, to which he pled guilty, and was banned from Fisherman's Wharf, Union Square, and the Embarcadero for a period of five years. While in San Francisco, Sandler also attracted attention for yelling at tourists who refused to pay him after taking his picture, falsely claiming to work at various stores, and intimidating people with "offensive rants". A manager of a local candy store said that Sandler falsely told people the store was run by the pharmaceutical industry, and that she thought it was "creepy" that "Evil Elmo" posed outside a candy store that attracted children.

Sandler moved to Los Angeles and continued to go on antisemitic rants while working as a performer on the Santa Monica Pier. A 2016 article in the Los Angeles Times detailed Sandler's itinerant lifestyle, and said that while costumed performers were not uncommon in Los Angeles, "none of the other[s] is likely to carry a weight greater than Sandler". By this point, he was mainly dressing as Cookie Monster. A police officer said that he had become a "national nuisance". Visitors at a local zoo complained that he had told them not to shop at zoo stores because they were "owned by a Muslim group". He allegedly threatened to beat up another man dressed as Cookie Monster, and told diners that the restaurant they were eating at had "poisoned a small child and bribed congressmen to cover it up."

As of 2023, Sandler was active in Santa Cruz, California, where he was not charged with a crime; however, he was accused of "badgering people" and behaving in a "creepy" manner while wearing a Cookie Monster suit. The police put out a statement advising people not to interact with Sandler if they see him.
