= Sesame Street: Elmo's A-to-Zoo Adventure =

2010 video game

- North American box art for Wii, showing the Elmo cover, and the main characters Elmo and Zoe
- Developer(s): Black Lantern Studios
- Publisher(s): Warner Bros. Interactive Entertainment
- Platform(s): Microsoft Windows; Wii; Nintendo DS
- Release: NA: October 19, 2010; AU: November 10, 2010
- Genre(s): Adventure, edutainment
- Mode(s): Single-player, multiplayer

Sesame Street: Elmo's A-to-Zoo Adventure is a Sesame Street video game featuring Elmo. It was developed by American company Black Lantern Studios, released on October 19, 2010 from Warner Bros. Interactive Entertainment for Microsoft Windows, Wii, and Nintendo DS. It also shared the same release date, developer and platforms as Sesame Street: Cookie's Counting Carnival.

The Nintendo versions utilize motion controls via the Wii Remote or touchscreen, and are packaged with special plush covers for the Wii Remote or Nintendo DS stylus to make it more comfortable to hold for players of the game's intended age. The PC version is primarily played with point and click mouse controls.

== Gameplay ==
There are 17 minigames in the Wii and PC versions, 16 minigames in the Nintendo DS version, and 14 minigames in all the versions.
