= Kilimani Sesame =

- Genre: Children's television
- Country of origin: Tanzania
- Original language: Swahili
- No. of episodes: 13

Production
- Running time: 30 minutes

Original release
- Release: April 2008

Kilimani Sesame is the Tanzanian version of Sesame Street. The show airs on Tanzania Broadcasting Corporation (TBC) and Television Zanzibar (TVZ). The production was launched in April 2008. The United States Agency for International Development (USAID) sponsored the production.

== Overview ==
Thirteen half-hour television episodes, thirteen fifteen-minute radio episodes, and three storybooks have been produced. The radio episodes contain songs based around the issue of the episode.

In 2011 Kilimani Sesame was part of a malaria education campaign in collaboration with the Tanzanian government. The campaign included public service announcements for TV and radio and educational storybooks.

The program is dubbed in both Kiswahili and English.

== Characters ==
Muppet characters include Kami and Lulu, who originated in South Africa's Takalani Sesame, and Neno, the production's version of Elmo (also a main character in Takalani Sesame). In Takalani Sesame, Elmo was also called Neno (up until 2020) and Lulu is called Zuzu. Kami is an HIV-positive five-year old, who is enthusiastic and enjoys learning.

== Production ==
The show features adapted material from South Africa's co-production, Takalani Sesame, dubbed in Kiswahili. Live action segments are created by local producers, with help from Maweni Farm, a film production and consultant company.

=== Messaging ===
Malaria prevention and HIV/AIDS education are two of the program's key educational components. Other topics include literacy and math.

The program is part of the Roll Back Malaria Partnership's Global Malaria Action Plan (GMAP). Other organizations that the show has partnered with are The Jane Goodall Institute Tanzania/Roots and Shoots Program, Pact Tanzania, and Children and Youth Development Initiative.

== Impact ==
A 2010 study published in the Journal of Applied Developmental Psychology found the program had multiple positive impacts on children who were exposed to it, including improved cognitive development, social behavior, hygiene, and literacy and math skills.

== In other media ==
A song from the series, "Don't be sad", was included on Putumayo World Music's album Sesame Street Playground.
