= The Monster at the End of This Book =

Children's book by Jon Stone

The Monster at the End of This Book: Starring Lovable, Furry Old Grover
- Cover image
- Author: Jon Stone
- Illustrator: Michael Smollin
- Cover artist: Michael Smollin
- Language: English
- Series: Sesame Street
- Subject: Monsters
- Genre: Children
- Published: 1971 (Golden Books)
- Publication place: United States
- Media type: Print
- ISBN: 0-307-01085-6 (1996 ed.)
- Dewey Decimal: 813.1
- LC Class: MLCS 2006/42214 (P)
- Followed by: Would You Like To Play Hide and Seek with Lovable, Furry Old Grover?

The Monster at the End of This Book: Starring Lovable, Furry Old Grover (or simply The Monster at the End of This Book) is a children's picture book based on the television series Sesame Street and starring Grover. It was written by series writer and producer Jon Stone and illustrated by Michael Smollin, and originally published by Little Golden Books in 1971. It has since become the all-time bestselling Sesame Street book title and has been cited as a modern classic of children's literature.

== Plot ==
Having read the book's title, Grover is horrified and begs the reader not to finish the book so as to avoid confronting the titular monster. As the book continues, Grover constructs a series of obstacles to prevent the reader from advancing further, but because the obstacles are mere illustrations, none of them work. At the end of the book, however, Grover discovers that the monster is himself. He laughs and claims that he knew this all along, but the reader can see that he is quite embarrassed.

== Publication ==
Jon Stone was involved in the creation and early development of the show Sesame Street. He reportedly wrote The Monster at the End of This Book around the end of 1970 or early the following year while on a flight across the United States to California. At the time, Sesame Street was airing its second season. Michael Smollin, a former advertising executive, illustrated the book. The Monster at the End of This Book was first published in 1971 by Little Golden Books. Copies first sold for 39 cents. The musician Christopher Cerf, who wrote songs for Sesame Street later told The Washington Post that upon reading the manuscript he said "Oh my god, this is wonderful".

== Reception ==
The book was a quick success.

Originally written to introduce young children to the concept of reading a book from beginning to end, The Monster at the End of This Book is the bestselling Sesame Street book title of all time.

Based on a 2007 online poll, the National Education Association listed the book as one of its "Teachers' Top 100 Books for Children". In 2012, it was ranked number ten among the "Top 100 Picture Books" in a survey published by School Library Journal.

As of January 2021, the book had sold almost 13 million copies, making it one of the ten bestselling Little Golden Books. The author Danny Freedman wrote a column that month in The Washington Post describing the book as "an unlikely constant, at a rarefied height" and felt that "the book’s long tail of influence is out of proportion with its 24 pages and its cardboard cover devoid of medallions."

An expert on children's literature Leonard S. Marcus described the book as an important point in children's fiction as it led to further innovation in the field, inspiring other self-aware works of literature like The Stinky Cheese Man and Other Fairly Stupid Tales. According to Philip Nel, a professor of children's literature, the book's publication method and connection to television might be the reason it has attracted relatively little scholarly attention.

== Sequels and adaptations ==
Two direct sequels were produced, also written by Stone and Illustrated by Smollin. Would You Like To Play Hide and Seek with Lovable, Furry Old Grover? (ISBN 978-0394832920), was published in 1976, while Another Monster at the End of This Book: Starring Lovable, Furry Old Grover, and Equally Lovable, Furry Little Elmo (ISBN 0-375-80562-1), was published in 1996. The latter features Grover now coping with Elmo actually encouraging the reader to turn the pages out of sheer curiosity. Another sequel, The Momster at the End of This Book, will be published in 2026, but written by Brittany McInerney and illustrated by Helena Wu.

On January 30, 2013, the Sesame Street Twitter account adapted the story to the popular social media network, again starring Grover with some impromptu assistance from Wil Wheaton.

The book was adapted into an animated special, The Monster at the End of This Story, which was released on HBO Max on October 29, 2020.

== In other media ==
- A season four episode of Supernatural is called "The Monster at the End of This Book". In it, lead characters Dean and Sam discover a prophet has made a book series about their lives, including events to come.
