= Ulitsa Sezam =

Russian children's television series

- Genre: Children's television series
- Created by: Joan Ganz Cooney (concept); Jim Henson (concept)
- Directed by: Vladimir Grammatikov
- Country of origin: Russia

Production
- Executive producer: Natasha Lance Rogoff
- Producer: Robin Hessman
- Production companies: Children's Television Workshop (1996–2000); Sesame Workshop (2000–present)

Original release
- Network: NTV; ORT; STS
- Release: October 22, 1996 – present

Ulitsa Sezam (Russian: Улица Сезам) was a Russian production of the children's television program Sesame Street. The show was first released in 1996 and went off the air in 2011.

== History ==
In 1993, Sesame Workshop recruited Natasha Lance Rogoff to produce Ulitsa Sezam. It was funded by Russian advertising agency VideoArt and the U.S. Agency for International Development. A total of 279 Russians were recruited to help develop and produce the series, and the show's budget totaled US$6 million. Production began in 1994.

The initial creation of this series proved difficult with a myriad of complications like cultural clashes with prospective native talent, many of whom were resistant to emulating the American style of puppetry created by Jim Henson. Instead, they proposed native puppetry material that the producers like Rogoff could not accept as they were too violent, frightening, or went against the educational curriculum of the Children's Television Workshop (CTW).

Another problem involved different approaches to script writing. Some of the first scripts produced by the Russian team included "lecturing, tough-talking adults," which CTW pushed back on. Other scripts tended towards fantasy or the idea of leaving the country. In response, CTW encouraged the script writers to "create a childhood that they [envisioned] for a future generation of Russians", rather than to try and emulate their own childhoods.

Cultural clashes were also present during auditions; most of the children auditioning for the show "sat back in their chairs and started to sing very sad songs," which startled the American producers.

There were other problems like the assassinations of some of the production's local business partners, serious financial difficulties by the production's major local producer, and a military raid on the studio in which vital materials were seized.

The series debuted on October 22, 1996, on TV channels NTV and ORT. The show was nominated for a TEFI award in 1997, but lost to perennial favorite Good Night, Little Ones!.

=== Second season ===
The second season on "optimism" was filmed in 1999 and broadcast in 2000 on NTV and STS.

=== Third season ===
The third season began filming in September 2001 and was aired in November on STS.

The main theme of the third season was "Diversity in the world". Several celebrities were guests on the show, including actors Leo Durov and Mary Aronov, composer Grigory Gladkov, and opera singer Vyacheslav Voynorovsky.

=== Fourth season ===
In 2006, the show celebrated its tenth anniversary. Filming of the new fourth season took place in early 2006 in the pavilion "Mosfilm". The premiere of the new season was broadcast on STS channel in September 2006.

The city yard set was re-vamped to reflect a more realistic depiction of modern-day urban Russia. An intact oak tree grows in the center of this courtyard, and windows from surrounding houses face each other so neighbors can pop their heads out to greet one another. The set includes a creative art center and a playground with an urban backdrop of buildings that was made grittier, a bit grey, with Khrushchev-style buildings in the background. Businka and Kubik's rooms change into a two-story house with a balcony.

New cast members included Yamila and Altin, two sisters recently arrived in Russia from Kazakhstan. The show also tackled the issue of adoption by introducing a young boy named Kolya who was adopted by Aunt Dinara and her husband, Uncle Jura.

Season 4 introduced a new recurring segment inspired by Prairie Dawn's art show from Play with Me Sesame where Businka shows artwork done by kids.

Celebrity guests for the season included TV presenter Tina Kandelaki, actress Olga Prokofiev ("My Fair Nanny"), Ekaterina Guseva, Vladimir Turchinsky (Dynamo Moscow), Natasha Podolsk, Varvara, Vladimir Asimov, and children's group "Fidget".

== Content ==
One of the show's primary goals was to teach children about living in a democratic and diverse society, particularly with the recent fall of the Soviet Union. Other goals included instilling pride in children's culture and traditions, and to display a supportive environment in which children could feel secure. Children from different ethnic groups, as well as disabled and deaf children, were included in different segments. Cultural content included traditional Russian dances, instruments, and foods.

In addition to original content produced in Moscow, the show also featured Russian-dubbed clips of Sesame Street, Elmo's World, Global Grover and Play with Me Sesame; these comprised about 30-50% of the show's content.

The series is set in a Russian courtyard with a playground, surrounded by a mixture of traditional, rural, and urban architecture.

== Characters ==
Human characters included:

- Aunt Dasha, who lives in a traditional cottage and preserves Russian folklore and traditions
- Katya, an 8-year old girl who is fond of classical music.
- Katya's mother, a physician
- Katya's father, a repair man

Muppet characters included:

- Zeliboba (Зелибоба), a nine-foot furry blue Dvorovoi (tree spirit) who enjoys dancing, can smell music, and tries hard to be polite. He slightly resembles a hound in some aspects (long muzzle, floppy ears and a keen sense of smell), and always wears a long fuzzy cloak that looks somewhat like a regal mantle decorated with leaves and fluffy catkins.
- Businka (Бусинка), "bead", is a bright pink monster who finds joy in everything.
- Kubik (Кубик), "cube", is an orange monster who is the resident pensive problem-solver.
- Kermit
- Korzhik, the series' version of Cookie Monster
- Vlas and Enik, the series' versions of Bert and Ernie
- Znak, the series' version of Count von Count

== Episodes ==
The first season consisted of 52 half-hour episodes, which were broadcast over the show's first two years on air. The pilot episode shown to the press in January 1996 showed children from various Russian ethnic groups exploring Moscow's Pet Market.

By the time of 2005, the program had 3 seasons consisting of 156 half-hour episodes in total.

== Legacy ==
In 2022 the original producer, Natasha Lance Rogoff, released a non-fiction book, Muppets in Moscow, detailing the show's production.
