= Ayala Ingedashet =

Israeli musical artist

Ayala Ingedashet איילה אינגדשט
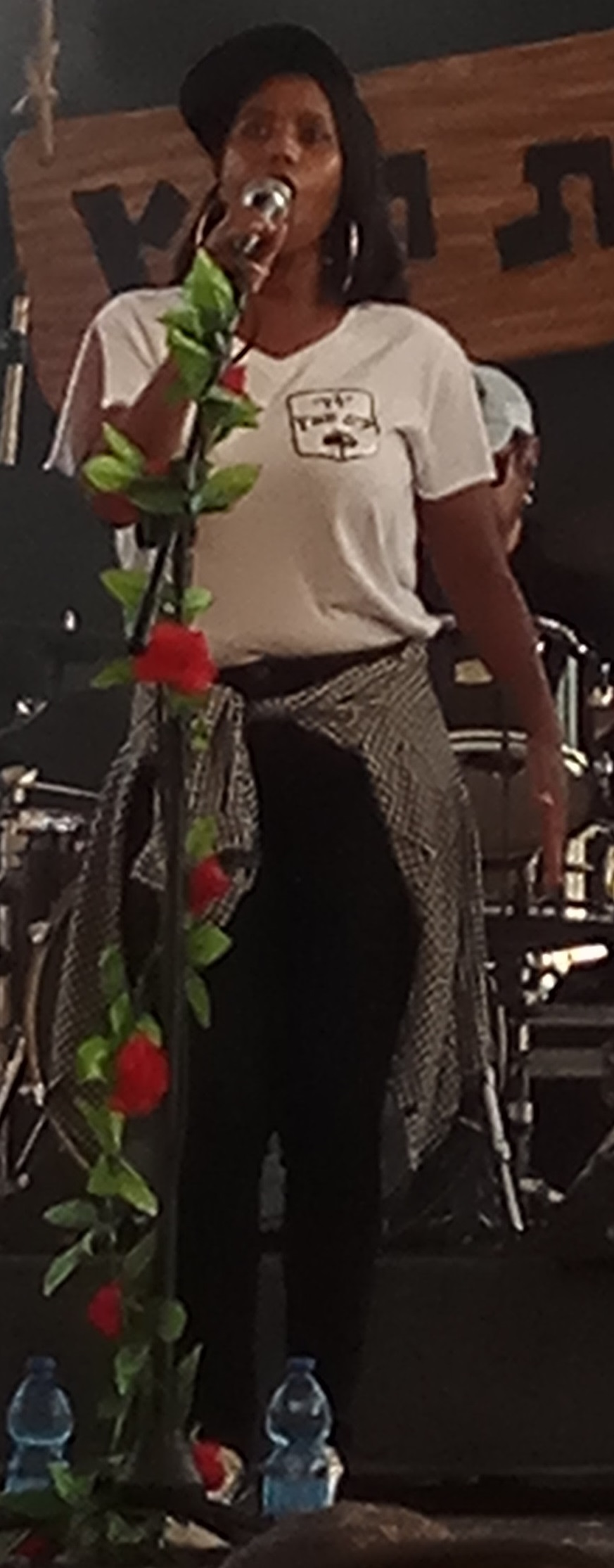

Background information
- Birth name: Ayala Ingedashet
- Born: August 21, 1978 (age 46)
- Origin: Ethiopia
- Genres: Pop, Israeli, Soul, R&B
- Occupation: Singer
- Years active: 2006–present
- Labels: Hed Arzi Music
- Website: MySpace Profile

Ayala Ingedashet (Hebrew: איילה אינגדשט; born August 21, 1978) is an Israeli singer, of Ethiopian Beta Israel origins.

== Early years ==
Ingedashet was born in Ethiopia and lived in Israel from the age of two, when she arrived with her family. The family lived in Jerusalem for several years and then decided to settle in the coastal city of Ashdod. When Ayala was young, her parents divorced, with the mother raising the family alone in a religious home, and the father moving to Kiryat Malachi.

At the age of 14, she joined a youth band in Ashdod. After enlisting in the Israel Defense Forces to complete her mandatory service, she was part of a band in the Israeli Navy, becoming the first Beta Israel forming part of a music ensemble in the Israel Defense Forces.

== Career ==
After being discharged from her military service, Ingedashet acted in a number of plays, such as "Little Tel Aviv" and "Fuenteovejuna", and also hosted on the "Briza" TV channel. Until 2006, Ingdashet did not record musical material of her own. However, Mooki and Piloni, members of the Shabak Samech hip hop band, nurtured her musically, including participating in Mooki's performances and albums.

Ingdashet began collaborating with the music producer Roy Edri and the Israeli record label Hed Arzi, which eventually resulted in her debut self-titled album, which was released in March 2007, becoming the first Ethiopian-born Israeli singer with a major-label deal. Her musical influences in the album included Erykah Badu and Lauryn Hill. The album was a success and earned her popularity and collaborations with mainstream acts like Ehud Banai, Mosh Ben-Ari, Jill Scott, and Macy Gray. That same year, Ingdashet participated in Momi Levy's album Yabou Ishi, in which she sang with Levy the song Notzeh BaRuach ("Feather in the Wind"), a cover version of Rita's original song.

Today, she is considered to be perhaps second only to Cabra Casay amongst the first Ethiopian Israeli singers to become mainstream singers, having had a successful album by a major label, as well as having performed the Israeli national anthem at the opening of the 2009 Maccabiah Games. She has also recorded some of the songs in the soundtracks of the different seasons of the teen series Yeladei Beit haEtz ("Children of the Tree House"), broadcast by Kan Educational. She has also participated in different editions of the Hullegeb Israeli-Ethiopian Art Festival. Ingedashet has also been part of the cast of the children's series Shalom Sesame.

Twelve years later, after having married and given birth to three children, Ingedashet released her second album, BaSchuna MiMul (In the Neighborhood opposite); the first single extracted from it, is a song about her childhood as well as her mother's childhood in Ethiopia.

== Family ==
She is the eldest of four sisters. Her sisters Mary Ingedashet and Malka Ingedashet are also singers but her sister Oshrat Ingedashet is an actress.

== Albums ==
- Ayala Ingedashet (2007)
- BaSchuna MiMul (2019)
