= Zhima Jie =

- 芝麻街
- Based on: Sesame Street
- Country of origin: China
- No. of episodes: 130 (1998); 52 (2010)

Production
- Running time: 30 minutes (1998) 11 minutes (2010)
- Production companies: Children's Television Workshop 1998–2000; Sesame Workshop 2000–2001

Original release
- Network: Shanghai Television
- Release: 1998 – 2001

Zhima Jie (Chinese: 芝麻街; pinyin: Zhīma Jiē) is the Chinese co-production of Sesame Street. The show, which aired on Shanghai Television, ran from 1998 to 2001, for a total of 130 half-hour episodes. It was filmed in Shanghai.

== History ==
=== 1998 version ===
Pre-production on the show was headed in part by a team of eighteen Chinese child education specialists, led by Xie Xide. In 1996 some of the Shanghai Television producers also traveled to New York to meet and work with Sesame Workshop staff. Kevin Clash ran the auditions and training for the production's puppeteers.

Unlike other international co-productions, the producers insisted on having their own version of Big Bird, Da Niao, rather than a new full-body puppet. This was due to Big Bird's popularity in China after the 1983 film, Big Bird in China. Caroll Spinney, who originated the character on the American production, was involved in the casting and training of the puppeteer who played Da Niao, had final say on who would play the character. Spinney stated that the show "came together very well".

General Electric sponsored the show from 1998 to 2001. Spinney said that production ceased because the Chinese government had stopped financing it. There was an unsuccessful attempt to revive it for the 2004 season.

=== 2010 version ===
Zhima Jie returned in December 2010 as Zhima Jie: Da Niao Kan Shijie (Sesame Street: Big Bird Looks at the World). It has aired on CCTV Children's Channel, Guangdong Jiajia, and on Toonmax Channel. The program was funded in part by the Merck Foundation.

== Characters ==
=== 1998 ===
- Xiao Mei Zi, Little Plum, a bright red monster who is "serious and level-headed" and snores loudly. She was the equivalent of Elmo in this series. Elmo (proper) is introduced for the 2010 series.
- Hu Hu Zhu, Puffing Pig, is an ageless, furry blue pig, who is "very proud of the long line of blue pigs from whom he is descended". He loves arts, especially opera.
- Da Niao, the Chinese version of Big Bird, he lives at a park in a nest and enjoys eating bird seed cookies. His is also "friendly and cheerful, though a bit slow at times". Da Niao was played by Mien Mien. Out of an initial pool of 100 applicants for the part, Clash chose four to audition for Spinney. He chose Mien because he thought Mien's personality, which he called "compassionate, sweet, and thoughful", matched the show's theme for the first season, kindness and compassion, attributes that Spinney thought was necessary for the character.

=== 2010 ===
- Tiger Lily, a tiger cub and martial arts expert.
- Elmo, a furry red monster from Sesame Street.
- Old Lady Wang, owner of a noodle shop and practitioner of tai chi.

== Messaging ==
Like other international co-productions, Zhima Jie covered the four broad curriculum categories of Child's World (understanding the self), Family and Society, Symbolic Representation (reading and numeracy) and Cognitive Organization (classification and perception). However, the production also added a fifth category of Aesthetics and Arts, which included coverage of Chinese calligraphy, experiencing nature, dance, and music composition.

Compassion was the main theme of the 1998 production's first season. Spinney stated in 2003 that it was an appropriate choice, since "the only things for children to watch on TV were Japanese cartoons, which tend to be aggressive, violent, and not particuarly educational". The producers also sought to depict the characters being kind and caring towards each other. The show included segments showing cultural diversity within China and reminding children that failure is okay. It emphasized relationships and social themes. It had "bumpers" lasting thirty seconds that aimed to teach specific scientific concepts, like relative buoyancy of different objects. Spinney stated that Zhima Jie was the first time Chinese educational television attempted depicting nonviolent solutions.

The 2010 production focused on science education and emergency preparedness. Having episodes focus primarily on science allowed creators to explore a topic with more depth than would be possible in a shorter segment.

== Episodes ==
The 1998–2001 production reportedly consisted of 130 half-hour episodes. As it did not see home video releases, only a few clips of the show have surfaced on the internet.

The 2010 production totaled 52 11-minute episodes.

== Books ==
- Sesame Street School Readiness (11 titles)
- Sesame Street Thinking Child (6 titles)
- Sesame Street Learning Environment (4 titles)

== In other media ==
From 2014 through 2019, characters from Sesame Street and Zhima Jie guest-starred on Bai Nian La (拜年啦), broadcast every Chinese New Year (January 31, 2014 – February 5, 2019). These six years were the Year of the Horse, the Goat, the Monkey, the Rooster, the Dog, and the Pig.

== Works cited ==
- Cole, Charlotte F.; Richman, Beth A.; McCann-Brown, Susan K. (2001). "The World of Sesame Street Research". In Fisch, Shalom M.; Truglio, Rosemarie T. (eds.). "G" is for Growing: Thirty Years of Research on Children and Sesame Street. Mahweh, New Jersey: Lawrence Erlbaum Associates. ISBN 0-8058-3394-3.
- Spinney, Caroll; Milligan, Jason (2003). The Wisdom of Big Bird (and the Dark Genius of Oscar the Grouch: Lessons from a Life in Feathers. New York: Villard Books. ISBN 0-375-50781-7.
