= Sabai Sabai Sesame =

Television series

Sabai Sabai Sesame, or Happy Happy Sesame in English, is the Cambodian version of the popular American children's series Sesame Street.

It debuted 13 December 2005 on Apsara TV-11. The show was produced by Educational Television Cambodia in association with Sesame Workshop, through a grant from the United States embassy. Episodes were aired twice weekly in Khmer.

The show largely consisted of clips of the American production dubbed in Khmer by Babel Studios and Seven Colours.
