= Jalan Sesama =

- Genre: Children's television series
- Based on: Sesame Street
- Theme music composer: Jack Arthur Simanjuntak
- Opening theme: "Di Jalan Sesama"
- Ending theme: "Di Jalan Sesama" (instrumental)
- Country of origin: Indonesia
- Original language: Indonesian
- No. of seasons: 3
- No. of episodes: >156

Production
- Running time: 30 minutes
- Production companies: Creative Indigo Productions; Sesame Workshop

Original release
- Network: Trans7
- Release: 18 February 2008 – 26 February 2010

Jalan Sesama is the Indonesian adaptation of the American children's television series, Sesame Street. The series was produced by Creative Indigo Productions in association with Sesame Workshop.

On 13 April 2020, due to the COVID-19 pandemic, the series re-aired on TVRI as part of Belajar dari Rumah programming block sponsored by Ministry of Education and Culture.

== History ==
In March 2006, the series was created with funding by the United States government through USAID, which totaled US$8.5 million.

Filming for the series took place in Jakarta beginning in May 2007. A total 156 episodes were planned. Mohammad Zudhi acted as the series educational consultant.

The series debuted on 18 February 2008 on Trans7. A magazine to accompany the show, Jalan Sesama Magazine, was scheduled to release in April of the same year.

== Content ==
The program's set resembles an Indonesian neighborhood, with clay-tiled houses, a snack cart, and a motorcycle taxi stop. Traditional forms of performance, including gamelan and wayang, were included in segments.

The pilot episode showed the characters preparing for, and later partaking in, a celebration for the opening of a new library. Guest stars in the first season included Hetty Koes Endang, Titiek Puspa, Gilang Ramadhan, and Surya Saputra.

=== Messaging ===
Jalan Sesama teaches watchers about diversity, environmental awareness, and positive character building. The show avoided mentions of religion for its first season, due to the topic's sensitive nature.

Season 3 of the series focused on the environment, and included information on how to prepare for natural disasters. Season 5 of the show had creativity as its main theme.

== Characters ==
- Momon - A 5-year-old yellow monster boy who is very neat and loves drawing and counting.
- Putri - An active and extroverted young girl who is always asking Momon for help.
- Tantan - A wise orangutan that settles every dispute on Jalan Sesama.
- Jabrik - A baby rhinoceros that is always complaining and laughing.
- Elmo - introduced in the show's third season

== Episodes ==
The series consisted of about 52 half-hour episodes each season, with a total of 156 episodes over three seasons.

== Impact ==
A 2010 study found that children who watched the program showed greater improvements in cognitive skills, cultural awareness, environmental awareness, health and safety knowledge, literacy, mathematics, and social development than children who had not watched the program.
