= Rua Sésamo (TV series) =

- Genre: Children's television
- Country of origin: Portugal
- Original language: Portuguese

Production
- Executive producer: Manuel Petroneo
- Production companies: Radiotelevisão Portuguesa; Children's Television Workshop

Original release
- Release: 6 November 1989 – 27 May 1996

Rua Sésamo is the Portuguese co-production of the American children's television program Sesame Street, produced by Radiotelevisão Portuguesa (RTP) and the Children's Television Workshop. It premiered on 6 November 1989 on RTP1, and has since also been broadcast in other Portuguese-speaking markets, including Angola, Cape Verde, Guinea-Bissau, Mozambique, and São Tomé and Príncipe.

== Production ==
Radiotelevisão Portuguesa (RTP) was not new to Sesame Street, as a package of episodes was broadcast in the 1976/77 season under the name Abre-te Sésamo.

Planning for the series began in 1987 between RTP and Children's Television Workshop. Maria Emilia Brederode served as the show's pedagogical director. An RTP team was sent to New York City to select the animation, puppet and live-action segments from the American version, the adaptation for which took two years. The series ended up becoming one of the most expensive productions RTP had made to date, with the first season alone costing the equivalent of €2 million. The street created by Moniz Ribeiro was a faithful adaptation of the original one. Muppet sketches were sourced from the original series, dubbed into Portuguese, yet the ones in the street scenes were made exclusively for the Portuguese version. Several hours of animation, lasting one minute, were commissioned specifically for this version. Segments were filmed in mainland Portugal, Azores, Madeira, Africa and Macao, to provide a variety of realities to the viewer. The series was also broadcast on state television channels in Portuguese-speaking African countries with the primary goal of promoting the Portuguese language and the development of these countries.

After the end of the series, RTP replicated the formula relying entirely on Portuguese productions, with Jardim da Celeste (1997–2000) and Ilha das Cores (2007–2009). RTP has also aired segments of other Sesame Workshop productions in its programming, which in the USA are part of the main program.

== Content ==
The first and second seasons consisted of 130 half-hour episodes each. The later two seasons had 90 each. In order to reach out to a wider number of viewers, the episode was broadcast twice a day, in the morning and in the late afternoon. The morning repeats later added subtitles.

== Characters ==
Muppets:

- Poupas, equivalent to Big Bird, recolored orange. Portrayed by Luís Velez, whose vision inside the "blind" costume was possible thanks to a television screen during filming.
- Ferrão, equivalent to Oscar, recolored brown, who lived in a wooden crate, as opposed to a trash can. Some of the Oscar sketches from the original series made it to the Portuguese version.
- Egas and Becas, Bert and Ernie.
- Monstro das Bolachas, the Cookie Monster.
- Tita, an original cat Muppet, not based on any pre-existing character. It was created in the second season to add a female element.
- Carlos Luz, a Muppet based on television presenter Carlos Cruz and voiced by him.

Humans:

- Guiomar, played by Alexandra Lencastre. Lencastre did not like the name given to her character, but ended up becoming popular.
- Gil, played by Pedro Wilson, a character with African background that was created on purpose with the aim of being a positive role model.

The human characters changed in the final season. In its first episode, André (played by Vítor Norte) moved and Gil had to do medical tasks in Africa. To fill in the void of the two characters a new African-descendant character, António (played by Ricardo Monteiro) joined, and to replace Guiomar, Ana (played by Rita Loureiro). The dubbing of the American-produced shorts was changed, being done at Somnorte in Vila Nova de Gaia.

== Reception ==
Within its first year of broadcast, the show was being viewed daily by 95% of its target audience (children 3–7 years old). In parallel with the series, a magazine was created, publication ceased in 2000, four years after the series ended.

== In other media ==
Tita was included in Sesame Workshop's 1993 New Year's special Sesame Street Stays Up Late.
