= Sesame Street: Cookie's Counting Carnival =

2010 video game

- North American box art for Wii, showing the Cookie cover, and the main characters Cookie Monster and Big Bird
- Developer(s): Black Lantern Studios
- Publisher(s): Warner Bros. Interactive Entertainment
- Platform(s): Windows, Wii, Nintendo DS
- Release: NA: October 19, 2010; AU: November 10, 2010
- Genre(s): Adventure, edutainment
- Mode(s): Single-player, multiplayer

Sesame Street: Cookie's Counting Carnival is a Sesame Street video game developed by American company Black Lantern Studios, released on October 19, 2010, from Warner Bros. Interactive Entertainment for the Microsoft Windows, the Wii, and Nintendo DS. It also shared the same release date, developer and platforms as Sesame Street: Elmo's A-to-Zoo Adventure.

The Nintendo versions use motion controls via the Wii Remote or touchscreen, and are packaged with special plush covers for the Wii Remote or Nintendo DS stylus to make it more comfortable to hold for players of the game's intended age. The Windows version is primarily played with point and click mouse controls.

== Gameplay ==
There are twelve game modes to play, as well as fourteen minigames.
