= Shalom Sesame =

- Genre: Children's television series
- Based on: Rechov Sumsum
- Countries of origin: United States; Israel
- Original languages: English; Hebrew

Production
- Running time: 30 minutes
- Production companies: Sesame Workshop; HOP! Channel (revival series)

Original release
- Network: Direct-to-video
- Release: 1987 – 1991
- Network: Direct-to-video
- Release: October 5, 2010 – October 11, 2011

Shalom Sesame is an anglicized variation of Rechov Sumsum (רחוב סומסום), the Israeli version of Sesame Street, which originally aired in 1983. Shalom Sesame was produced in 1986 and between 1990 and 1991 for the direct-to-video market in the United States, aimed at introducing Israel and Judaism to children that are not necessarily fluent in the Hebrew language, since Rechov Sumsum is completely done in Hebrew. Beginning in April 1988, the Shalom Sesame episodes were broadcast on PBS following their video releases.

It includes characters from both Sesame Street and Rechov Sumsum, the Hebrew/Arabic version of Sesame Street, produced and aired in Israel, the Palestinian territories, and Jordan.

Also, as with the American series, the series featured special guests well known to American viewers. Guests included Itzhak Perlman, Bonnie Franklin, Mary Tyler Moore, Mandy Patinkin, Alan King, Joan Rivers, Nell Carter, Jerry Stiller, Jeremy Miller, Anne Meara, Tracey Gold, B.B. King, Sarah Jessica Parker, and Paul Shaffer.

In October 2010, a new 12-part Shalom Sesame series began, with stars including Jake Gyllenhaal, Christina Applegate, Debra Messing, Greg Kinnear, Anneliese van der Pol, and Cedric the Entertainer. The new series added Mahboub, an Arab Israeli Muppet, and other new characters from the 2006 revival of Rechov Sumsum. It also features the Israeli singer Ayal Ingedashet, of Ethiopian Jewish background, as the human character Lamlam in each series. The only revival episodes broadcast on PBS Kids were "Chanukah: The Missing Menorah" and "It's Passover, Grover!" It was directed by Aaron Kaplan who followed by directing all the local sesame series thereafter.

== Characters from Rechov Sumsum ==
- Kippi Ben Kippod, (קיפי בן קיפוד) (translated means Kippi son of Hedgehog) a pink, giant, cheerful and optimistic porcupine analogous to Big Bird, he has a pet goat named Sheba. Kippi first appeared on Rechov Sumsum in 1983, and Kippi also appeared in Barrio Sésamo as Espinete, A big, human-sized pink hedgehog that does not wear clothes during the day, despite having used disguises (including a wizard, Dracula and a superhero called Super Espi).
- Moishe Oofnik, Oscar the Grouch's cousin
- Brosh, an orange monster who likes cleaning
- Mahboub, a young blue monster who speaks both Hebrew and Arabic
- Avigail, a young pink monster who likes to play and is happy with everyone

== Characters from Sesame Street ==
- Bert and Ernie a.k.a. "Benz and Arik"
- Count von Count a.k.a. "Mar Sofer"
- Cookie Monster a.k.a. "Ugifletzet"
- Kermit the Frog a.k.a. "Kermit haTzfardea"
- Grover, a blue monster from Sesame Street a.k.a "Croovy"

== Books ==
- Shalom Sesame Presents a Chanukah Party for Kippi is a book written by Louise Follow based on the Shalom Sesame series. It was published by Comet International as a paperback in August 1995. (ISBN 1-884857-06-X).
- It's a Mitzvah, Grover! by Tilda Balsley (Author), Ellen Fischer (Author), Tom Leigh (Illustrator), ISBN 0761375627
- Grover and Big Bird's Passover Celebration by Tilda Balsley (Author), Ellen Fischer (Author), Tom Leigh (Illustrator), ISBN 0761384928
- The Count's Hanukkah Countdown by Tilda Balsley (Author), Ellen Fischer (Author), Tom Leigh (Illustrator), ISBN 0761375570

== Episodes ==
=== Season 1 (1986) ===
No. overall	No. in season	Title	Original release date
1	1	"The Land of Israel"	TBA
2	2	"Tel Aviv"	TBA
3	3	"Kibbutz"	TBA
4	4	"The People of Israel"	TBA
5	5	"Jerusalem"	TBA

=== Season 2 (1990) ===
No. overall	No. in season	Title	Original release date
6	1	"Chanukah"	TBA
7	2	"Sing Around the Seasons"	TBA
8	3	"Journey to Secret Places"	TBA

=== Season 3 (1991) ===
No. overall	No. in season	Title	Original release date
9	1	"Aleph-Bet Telethon"	TBA
10	2	"Passover"	TBA
11	3	"Kids Sing Israel"	TBA

=== Revival series (2010–11) ===
No.	Title	Original release date
1	"Welcome to Israel"	October 5, 2010
2	"Chanukah: The Missing Menorah"	October 5, 2010
3	"Shabbat Shalom, Grover!"	January 11, 2011
4	"Grover Plants a Tree"	January 11, 2011
5	"Mitzvah on the Street"	January 11, 2011
6	"Be Happy, It's Purim!"	March 8, 2011
7	"It's Passover, Grover!"	March 20, 2011
8	"Grover Learns Hebrew"	May 10, 2011
9	"Countdown to Shavuot"	May 10, 2011
10	"The Sticky Shofar"	August 23, 2011
11	"Monsters in the Sukkah"	August 23, 2011
12	"Adventures in Israel"	October 11, 2011

== Home media ==
In the 1990s, the entire series was released on home video, in the VHS format.

In the mid-2000s, SISU Home Entertainment, a U.S. marketer and distributor of Israeli and Jewish video, audio, book, and multimedia properties] released the entire series on a five-disc DVD set, available as a set or per disc.
