= Rechov Sumsum =

- Also known as: Sesame Street
- Country of origin: Israel
- Original languages: Hebrew; Arabic
- No. of seasons: 10 seasons and 2 spin-offs
- No. of episodes: 337

Production
- Production company: Sesame Workshop

Original release
- Network: Israeli Educational Television; Channel 2 HOP! Channel
- Release: 13 March 1983 – present

Rechov Sumsum (רחוב סומסום [ʁeˈχov sumˈsum]; lit. 'Sesame Street') is the Israeli adaptation of the American children's show Sesame Street.

The first three series of the show were a joint production of the Israeli Educational Television and the Sesame Workshop.

The storyline and cast of Rechov Sumsum are tailored to an Israeli audience.

== History ==
The idea for Sesame Street being aired in Israel goes back to 1971 when black and white episodes of the show broadcast in English were briefly shown on Israeli television. The Israeli Ministry of Education thought it was entertaining, but not educational enough for Children, so it was eventually taken off air.

Rechov Sumsum consists of five television series and one short-lived spin-off: Rechov Sumsum, Shalom Sesame, Rechov Sumsum/Shara'a Simsim, Sippuray Sumsum and Rechov Sumsum (2006), Shalom Sesame (2009).

== Rechov Sumsum (1983–1997) ==
This original Israeli version of the series was the most popular. 195 episodes were produced and broadcast between 1983 and 1986 on the Israeli Educational Television. Puppet segments were taken from the American series and dubbed in Hebrew (the same has been done in all other Israeli versions of the series). All other aspects of the production were local: The program took place in an Israeli neighborhood in which children and adults played together. Original connecting segments were added in which Israeli children shared a view of their lives. The series had a parallel character to Big Bird – a big porcupine, by the name of "Kippi" and a parallel character to Oscar The Grouch, by the name of "Moishe Oofnik". Oofnik was a punk and used to complain a lot and bother the neighborhood's residents, but even so, he soon became friends with the children in the neighborhood. The residents who lived in the street included Avner and Hanna, who were the owners of the coffee shop near Kipi's burrow. After they moved to a different city they were replaced by a new coffee shop named Gabi (Gabi Amrani). Opposite the coffee house lived Miki (Miki Kam) and Nathan (Nathan Dattner). Nathan lived in front of an older resident named Yona (Yona Atari). In front of Yona's apartment was Shmil's (Shmuel Shilo) electricity appliance repairing shop, where Miki worked as Shmil's assistant.

Occasionally Albert (Albert Iluz) used to come over to the neighborhood for visits – a peculiar character with a French accent with whom Kipi used to consult on different issues. Salim (Salim Dau) used to explain to the children in the neighborhood the meaning of different words in Arabic and the show also included different famous Israeli guest stars, such as the duo "HaDodaim", Haim Moshe, Gidi Gov and Rotem Abuhav.

The opening theme song of the original series was written by Eli Mohar and composed by Yoni Rechter which also performed it together with Gidi Gov, Mazi Cohen, Dafna Armoni and a group of children from the Tzadikov choir.

Kippi Ben Kippod and Moishe Oofnik also made an appearance on the 1993 special Sesame Street Stays Up Late! alongside other international Sesame Street characters.

The series was broadcast repeatedly many times until 1996. Then, these broadcasts were suspended due to the expiry of the co-production agreement between the Israeli Educational Television and the Sesame Workshop – the rights owner of the original American Sesame Street. The right to show the Hebrew-dubbed segments of the original American show produced by the Sesame Workshop was transferred to the private cable channel "HOP! Channel".

Following the success of the series many products were marketed to the Israeli public based on the series, including records of the songs and the sketches from the show, dolls of Kipi Ben Kipod, school supplies, clothing, and bedding. A new fashion that started due to the show was the "Kipi shoes" – Plaided slippers in shades of brown and black, which although existed before the show, became much more popular following the show.

The curriculum goals of the show were: Mutual Respect (human diversity, mutual respect); The Child's World (body parts, child's powers, health, reasoning, problem-solving); Reading, Mathematics, and Writing (pre-reading and writing, numbers, geometric forms); and Cognitive Organization (perceptual discrimination, relational concepts, classifying). Although messages about mutual respect were always included in the curriculum of the original US show, it was the first time this area was a major focus of any version of Sesame Street. It was a priority because of the "profound political tension in the region". This production has been viewed as a model for the use of television to convey anti-sectarian messages.

=== Shalom Sesame (1989–1991) ===
The program Shalom Sesame was an Israeli–American co-production that combined American actors, such as Sarah Jessica Parker, Bonnie Franklin, Anne Meara, Mary Tyler Moore and Jerry Stiller, and the original Israeli cast members which participated in the original Rechov Sumsum series. In addition, the renowned violinist Yitzhak Perlman participated regularly in the series.

The series was produced in 1989 (its first season), 1990 (its second season), and 1991 (its third season), and was broadcast in Israel between the years 1989 and 1990.

The series was first intended for broadcast in the US and was therefore recorded completely in English. Only later it was dubbed in Hebrew for Israeli viewers (although the Shalom Sesame logo still showed up at the beginning). Following the big wave of immigration from Russia to Israel in those years, the series was also dubbed in Russian. In 2006 the series came out in the United States in a DVD bundle which included all episodes of the series (without the Hebrew dubbing).

== Rechov Sumsum (aka. Rechov Sumsum/Shara'a Simsim) (1998–2000) ==
In 1994, Children's Television Workshop proposed the idea of a joint Israeli-Palestinian Sesame Street co-production.

Production on the series began in 1995. Two separate Israeli and Palestinian teams were formed, with their producers and writers; the Israeli team was based in Tel Aviv, and the Palestinian team in Ramallah. Each team signed a separate deal with Children's Television Workshop. The series cost $4 million and was financed by multiple groups, including Israel Educational Television, Al-Quds Educational Television, and foreign donors. The show was nearly canceled while in production, due to pressures from both sides against cooperation. Several members of the Palestinian team left in May 1996 after Benjamin Netanyahu was elected.

Both the Israeli and Palestinian teams agreed before production that the show would not cover political issues, nor would they include imagery of soldiers, flags (or other symbols of nationalism), or religious locations and holidays. However, this was sometimes tested, as in one script where a Palestinian Olympic runner, Majed Abu Marajil, said he was representing the "Palestinian state". The segment was ultimately never filmed, as Marajil was unable to come to Tel Aviv for filming in 1997.

This combined production included both Israeli-Jews and Israeli-Arabs to generate a message of coexistence. Al-Quds University's Institute of Modern Media co-produced the series. The series premiered on April 1, 1998 and ran until the end of 2002.

The production included 70 episodes and featured new characters aside from Kipi and Oofnik. A new Israeli Muppet was named Dafi (a purple monster), and two Arab muppets named Hanin (an orange monster) and Kareem (a green rooster) were also introduced as a way to bring diversity into the cast. A new stage was built, which included a garden, a promenade, a bookstore and an ice cream store. Moishe Oofnik's old car was "stuck" in the center of the neighborhood. Due to the disintegration of the original muppet of Kipi Ben Kipod and due to rights issues, Kipi's muppet was re-designed with a more "muppet-like" design. Kipi was also given a more masculine-sounding voice by Guy Friedman.

The opening theme song was replaced with one composed by Shlomo Gronich and included some of the several sentences in Arabic.

The closing theme song reprise of the opening song was played instrumental, as Dafi and the human cast waving goodbye during the end credits.

The co-production received significant attention at the time and became the subject of articles in academic journals mainly due to ongoing tensions between Israel and Palestine. It also resulted in the show's producer Daoud Kuttab publishing a non-fiction book Sesame Street, Palestine: The Ups and Downs of Producing a Children's Program which covered the events of the show's production. The clips had recycled from some of the Shalom Sesame episodes.

The final promotional push for Rechov Sumsum/Shara'a Simsim was an appearance by Dafi, Hanneen, Karim, and Moishe at the Macy's Thanksgiving Day Parade on November 28, 2002, alongside various other characters from international versions of Sesame Street.

== Sippuray Sumsum (2002–2006) ==
In 2002, the decision was made to split the Israeli-Palestinian co-production and create a project entitled Sesame Stories which would act as the banner title for three separate programs serving the Middle East. Each program would share animated segments but have their own individual muppet characters.

The Israeli part of this project, Sippuray Sumsum ("Sesame Stories") was broadcast on the Israeli HOP! Channel and it featured two new Muppets named Noah and Brosh. The hosts of the show were Tzachi (Dror Keren) and Ibtisam (Hind Ayub). This series was largely funded by the European Union, and much like the previous co-production, its goal was to promote messages of respect and understanding among Israeli and Arab children in the Middle East. The series was occasionally broadcast on Channel 33 with Arabic dubbing.

== The fourth series – Rechov Sumsum (2006–present) ==
=== Season 1 ===
In 2006, the show transitioned back to the Rechov Sumsum name and debuted on the HOP! Channel, mixing the Sippuray Sumsum cast, new characters, and returning favorite Moishe Oofnik from the original seasons. From December 2006 a new series called "Rechov Sumsum" was produced for the Israeli HOP! Channel. The new series featured the main Muppets from Sippuray Sumsum – Noah and Brosh, along with the hosts Tzachi (Dror Keren) and Ibtisam (Hind Ayub), many other actors, and two new muppets, Avigail and Mahboub. Mahboub became a source of controversy as it was confirmed that he was a muppet of Arab origin.

There were also plans and negotiations to restore the original Muppets of Kipi Ben Kipod and Moishe Oofnik in this series, but eventually due to technical and economical considerations, only Moishe Oofnik was featured in the series. The opening theme is the original theme song of the show which was written by Yoni Rechter and sung by the Sharonit Children's Choir. The show also included a campaign against violence. The fourth series included 40 episodes.

The closing theme song reprise of the opening song was played instrumental, as the human and Muppet cast waving goodbye during the end credits.

=== Season 2 ===
In December 2009, a new season for Rechov Sumsum was produced for "Hop! Channel". The new season featured the previous Muppets: Avigail, Brosh, Mahboub and Moishe Oofnik with new neighbors including Sivan, a Muppet in a wheelchair and Sesame Street's Grover, or Kruvi in Hebrew.

=== Season 3 ===
In February 2012, another new season for Rechov Sumsum was produced for "Hop! Channel". The new season featured the previous Muppets: Avigail, Mahboub, Sivan and Moishe Oofnik with new neighbor called Sesame Street's Elmo.

=== Season 4 ===
In March 2015, another new season for Rechov Sumsum debuted on "Hop! Channel". The new season featured the muppets: Avigail, Mahboub, Sivan and Elmo. The focus for the season is "Learn about science and curiosity." Shani Cohen, Abigail's former Puppeteer, is going back to the show as a new human character called Ayelet, tour guide at the museum.

The closing theme song reprise of the opening song was played instrumental, as the human and Muppet cast waving goodbye during the end credits as Oofnik popping up on screen, making cameo appearances.

==== The fifth series – Shalom Sesame (2009–2011) ====
Between 2009 and 2011, 12 new Shalom Sesame direct-to-DVD episodes were produced. This is an Israeli–American co-production which combines various American actors, such as Anneliese van der Pol, Jake Gyllenhaal, Christina Applegate, Greg Kinnear, Debra Messing and Cedric the Entertainer, and is geared at teaching Jewish-American children about the Jewish culture. The series was filmed in the United States as well as select locations of Israel, including the Western Wall.

==== The sixth series - Tokhnit He'írvkh Shel Elmo (2022) ====
In October 2022, Tokhnit He'írvkh Shel Elmo, an adaptation of The Not Too Late Show with Elmo, debuted on "Hop! Channel". The new season featured two muppet relationships: Moishe Oofnik & Elmo.

==== Dubbing expansion (1999, 2000, 2001–present) ====
The franchise was dubbed in several projects and sketches, including The Adventures of Elmo in Grouchland, Elmo's World, Elmo the Musical, Mecha Builders and more projects in select Israeli TV networks and international streaming services like Netflix and YouTube.

== Original Muppet characters ==
Rechov Sumsum (The original series) and Shalom Sesame (The second series)

- Kippi Ben Kippod (Sarai Tzuriel) – a porcupine equivalent of Big Bird on Sesame Street.
- Moishe Oofnik (Gilles Ben David) – a brown grouch, similar to Cookie Monster and Oscar the Grouch on Sesame Street, who lives in a broken car.

Rechov Sumsum/Shara'a Simsim (The third series):

- Kippi Ben Kippod (Guy Friedman) – This series featured a new design of Kippi.
- Moishe Oofnik (Gilles Ben David)
- Dafi (Irit Shilo) – Haneen's best friend; a happy young purple monster.
- Haneen - a happy young orange monster, she lives on Shara'a Simsim with Karim.
- Karim - built by Paul Andrejco of Puppet Heap.

Sippurei Sumsum (Spin-off):

- Noah (Gilles Ben David)
- Brosh (Avi Yakir)

Rechov Sumsum (The fourth - fifth series):

- Moishe Oofnik (Gilles Ben David) – Moishe now lives in a green recycling bin. (seasons 1–3)
- Noah (Gilles Ben David) – a curious red monster, he is Mahboub's best friend. (season 1)
- Brosh (Avi Yakir) – an orange monster, he likes cleaning. (seasons 1–2)
- Mahboub (Yousef Sweid) – a young blue monster who speaks both Hebrew and Arabic. (seasons 1–4)
- Avigail (Shani Cohen and Guni Paz) – a young purple monster who speaks in the third person, she likes to play and is happy with everyone. (seasons 1–4)
- Sivan (Efrat Gonan) – a purple Muppet in a wheelchair. (seasons 2–4)
- Grover (Gilles Ben David and Yoav Heyman) – a blue monster from Sesame Street. (seasons 2)
- Elmo (Ariel Doron as the speaking voice and Zvika Fohrman as the singing voice) – a little red monster from Sesame Street. (seasons 3–4)

Tochnit Ha'Eiruach Shel Elmo:

- Moishe Oofnik (Gilles Ben David) - Moishe lives in a green recycling bin.
- Elmo (Efrat Gonan) - Elmo is now a late show monster host.

== Original American characters ==
- Cookie Monster a.k.a. "Ugifletzet" (Dov Reiser, 1983–1986 Shimon Cohen, 1989–2003 Eldad Prives 2009–2011 Giora Kenneth 2006–)
- Kermit the Frog a.k.a. "Kermit HaTzfardea" (Eyal Bertonov, 1983–1990 Yoav Tzafir, 1998–2000 Ami Mandelman 2009)
- Bert and Ernie a.k.a. "Arik and Bentz" (Benz Shlomo Bar-Aba 1983–2003 and Ami Mandelman; 2006– Arik Yosef Shiloach 1983-1986, Rami Baruch 1998–2000 and Zvika Fohrman 2003–)
- Grover a.k.a. "Kruvi" (Israel Gurion, 1983–1998 Gadi Levy 2000–2003 Yoav Hayman 2006–)
- Count von Count a.k.a. "Mar Sofer" (Albert Cohen, 1983–1998 Lior Halfon 2000–2003 Robert Henig 2006–)
- Herry Monster a.k.a. "Shraga" or Ezra (Gidi Gov)
- Oscar the Grouch (Avi Pnini 1983–2003 and Ido Mosseri 2006–)
- Elmo (Iris Zinger 1998–2000 and Zvika Fohrman 2003–)
- Telly Monster a.k.a. "Tali" (Itzik Saidoff 1998–2003 and Simcha Barbiro 2006–)

=== Other languages ===
Launch rollout timeline
Language	Show Title
Arabic	"شارع سمسم"
English	"Shalom Sesame"
Russian	"Шалом Сезам"

== See also ==
- Television in Israel
