= Shara'a Simsim =

- Also known as: Hikayat Simsim
- شارع سمسم
- Genre: Children's television
- Written by: Khalil Abu Arafeh
- Country of origin: Palestine

Production
- Executive producer: Daoud Kuttab
- Production company: Sesame Workshop

Original release
- Release: April 1, 1998 – 2011

Shara'a Simsim (Arabic: شارع سمسم) is a Palestinian educational television program for preschoolers based on the popular American children's show Sesame Street. The series began airing in 1998 as a joint program with the Israeli version of Sesame Street, Rechov Sumsum, as a way to promote coexistence between Israeli-Jews and Israeli-Arabs.

== Production history ==
=== 1998–2002: Bilingual program with Israel ===
In 1994 Children's Television Workshop, the American production company behind Sesame Street, proposed the idea of a joint Israeli-Palestinian Sesame Street co-production.

Production on the series began in 1995. Two separate Israeli and Palestinian teams were formed, with their own producers and writers; the Israeli team was based in Tel Aviv, and the Palestinian team in Ramallah. Each team signed a separate deal with Children's Television Workshop. The series cost $4 million and was financed by multiple groups, including Israel Educational Television, Al-Quds Educational Television, and foreign donors. The show was nearly cancelled while in production, due to pressures from both sides against cooperation. Several members of the Palestinian team left in May 1996 after Benjamin Netanyahu was elected.

Both the Israeli and Palestinian teams agreed prior to production that the show would not cover political issues, nor would they include imagery of soldiers, flags (or other symbols of nationalism), or religious locations and holidays. However, this was sometimes tested, as in one script where a Palestinian Olympic runner, Majed Abu Marajil, said he was representing the "Palestinian state". The segment was ultimately never filmed, as Marajil was unable to come to Tel Aviv for filming.

The Israeli-Palestinian co-production, which first aired on 1 April 1998, included 60 full episodes. The episodes aired on Israeli channels were 27–30 minutes long, aired daily, and included all of the Palestinian-produced material. 20 episodes, each 15 minutes long, were aired on Palestinian channels three times a week, and largely included only the Palestinian-produced material.

=== 2002–2012: Independent program ===
When the co-production dissolved, Palestine began its own program at the end of 2002 called Hikayat Simsim (Not to be confused with the separate Jordanian co-production of the same name). The show, which was hosted by Haneen and Kareem, primarily consisted of animated segments which told stories from Palestinian and Palestinian-Israeli culture. Some animated segments were shared with the corresponding Israeli production, Sippuray Sumsum.

The United States Agency for International Development (USAID), which had partially funded the show, retracted their funding in 2006 after Hamas won Palestinian elections. Production did continue with reduced funding from other organizations, resulting in a smaller season.

Production on a new revamped version of the show, again titled Shara'a Simsim began in December 2006 and continued through January 2007. The new episodes begain airing in May 2007 on ten channels of the Ma'an Network. The show combined original segments, which were filmed in Ramallah, with dubbed American segments. The show received US$2.5 million in funding from USAID between 2008 and 2011.

The show's fourth season aired in 2010.

Production in 2012 for the show's sixth season was put on hold due to cancelled funding from USAID, and the show's muppets were sent to New York for repairs.

== Characters ==
=== Rechov Sumsum/Shara'a Simsim ===
==== Muppets ====
- Dafi (Irit Shilo) – Haneen's best friend; a three-year-old purple Israeli monster
- Haneen (Fadi al-Ghoul) – a three-year-old orange Palestinian monster
- Kareem (Rajai Sandouka) – a seven-year-old punctual green rooster who showcases pride in his Palestinian culture
- Kippi Ben Kippod (Guy Friedman) – a pink porcupine who lives on Rechov Sumsum
- Moishe Oofnik (Gilles Ben David) – a brown grouch from Rechov Sumsum who lives in a broken car

==== Humans ====
Sources:

- Adel - a bilingual Palestinian music teacher; cousins with Amal
- Amal - an Israeli-Arab man who lives on Rechov Sumsum; cousins with Adel
- Leila - a 12-year-old Palestinian girl who loves computers
- Maski - an Ethiopian Jewish woman who likes to fix cars
- Sharon - a 25-year-old religious Israel shopkeeper

=== Hikayat Simsim (The second series) and Shara'a Simsim (The third series): ===
==== Muppets ====
- Haneen (Fadi al-Ghoul) - a five-year-old orange monster
- Kareem (Rajai Sandouka)

==== Humans ====
- Salim - a young man in his 20's who runs a Fix-It shop

== Content ==
As with other co-productions, the series teaches colors, literacy, numeracy, and vocabulary. The character of Kareem was used to give Palestinian boys a healthy role model. The show filmed live-action segments with Palestinians in professional careers, such as teachers, doctors, and business owners.

The 1998 show featured two separate street scenes, one for the Israeli characters and one for the Palestinian characters. The Israeli street had an ice cream shop on a boardwalk near the Mediterranean Sea, while the Palestinian street centered on a family grocery store near a spring, with scenes of Jerusalem in the background. The characters would visit each other, but did not share mutual spaces. These crossover segments focused on tolerance and respect, and tried to challenge stereotypes. For example, segments were filmed where characters ate hummus and falafel together, or learned to count in the other's language.

The 2007 iteration continued to avoid direct references to politics.

== Reception ==
The 1998 show was watched widely in Israel and the West Bank, but did not air in the Gaza Strip. Studies showed that children who had viewed the show for a few months held more positive views of the other group.

== In other media ==
In 2018 producer Daoud Kuttab wrote a book entitled Sesame Street, Palestine about the 1998 Israeli-Palestinian co-production.
