= Grover =

Sesame Street character

- Sesame Street character
- First appearance: The Ed Sullivan Show on December 24, 1967 (as Gleep); Grover prefers Captain G (as Grover) (May 1, 1970)
- Created by: Jim Henson; Frank Oz
- Performed by: Frank Oz (1970–2012); Eric Jacobson (1998–present)

In-universe information
- Alias: Super Grover
- Species: Muppet Monster
- Gender: Male

Grover is a Muppet character on the PBS/Netflix children's television show Sesame Street. Self-described as small, cute, and lovable, he is a blue monster who rarely uses contractions when he speaks or sings. Grover was originally performed by Frank Oz from his earliest appearances. Eric Jacobson has performed the character regularly from the year 1998 onwards.

== Origins ==
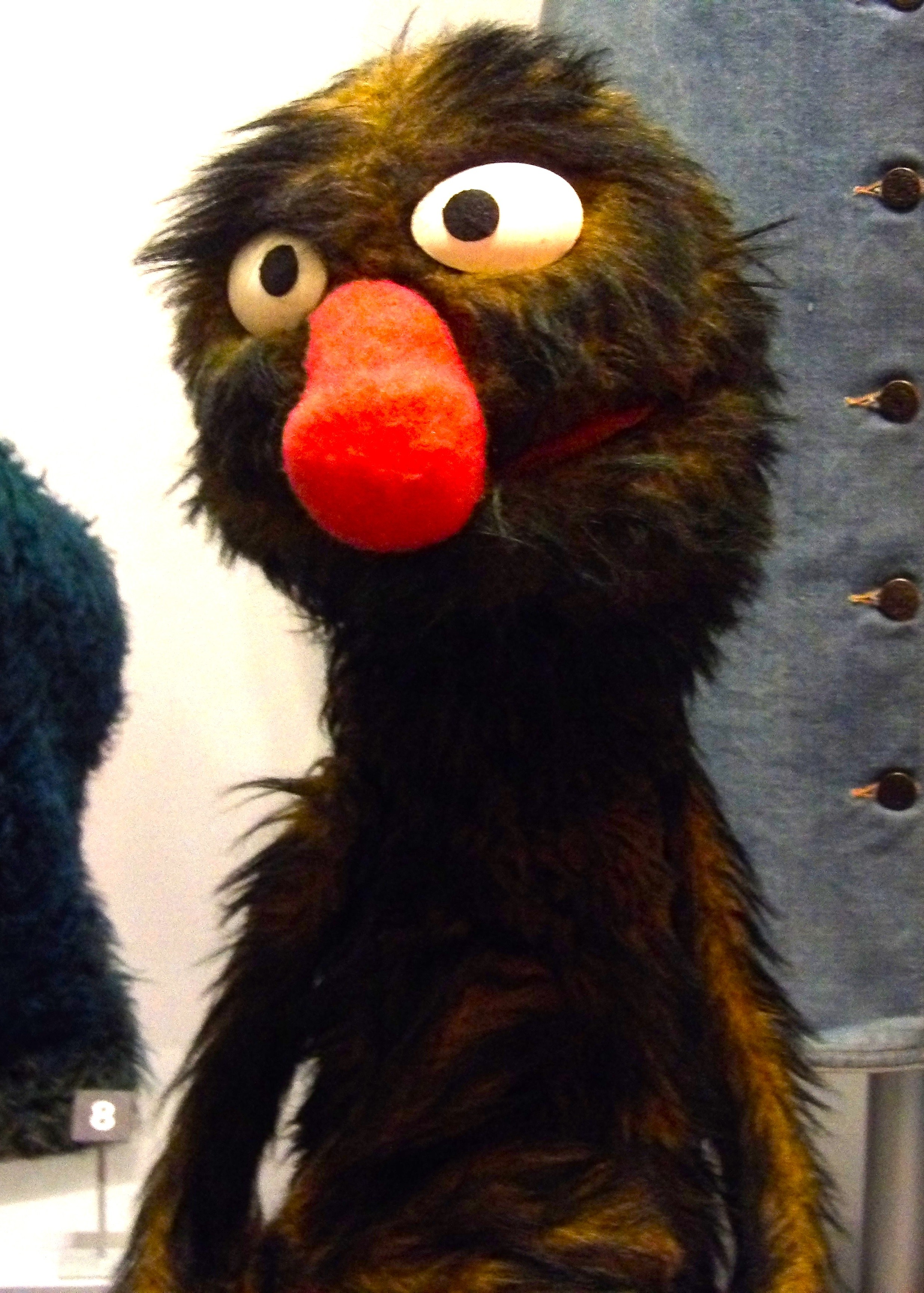
The original Grover puppet on display at the Smithsonian in 2024.

A prototype version of Grover appeared on The Ed Sullivan Show on Christmas Eve in 1967. This puppet had greenish-brown fur and a red nose. He also had a raspier voice – somewhat like Cookie Monster's – and was played a bit more unkempt than Grover would later behave. The monster was referred to as "Gleep", a monster in Santa's workshop. He later made a cameo appearance in The Muppets on Puppets in 1968 with the Rock and Roll Monster. In 1969, clad in a necktie, he appeared in the Sesame Street Pitch Reel in the board-room sequences. During the first season of Sesame Street, the character was nicknamed "Fuzzyface" or "The Hairy One", though neither would be used for his actual name. The muppet was not yet the "cute" character he would become, and he was not all that different in personality from the other monsters with whom he interacted.

In his book The Tipping Point, Canadian author Malcolm Gladwell notes that the character "was used in promotional films for IBM". The puppet first received the name "Grover" on May 1, 1970.

In an appearance on The Ed Sullivan Show on May 31, 1970, the character acquired his present appearance with blue fur and a pink nose. In this appearance, Kermit the Frog tried to sing "What Kind of Fool Am I?" (accompanying himself on piano), but Grover repeatedly interrupted him. The updated puppet was later used beginning in the second season of Sesame Street, by this point fully formed into his current identity.

== Appearances ==
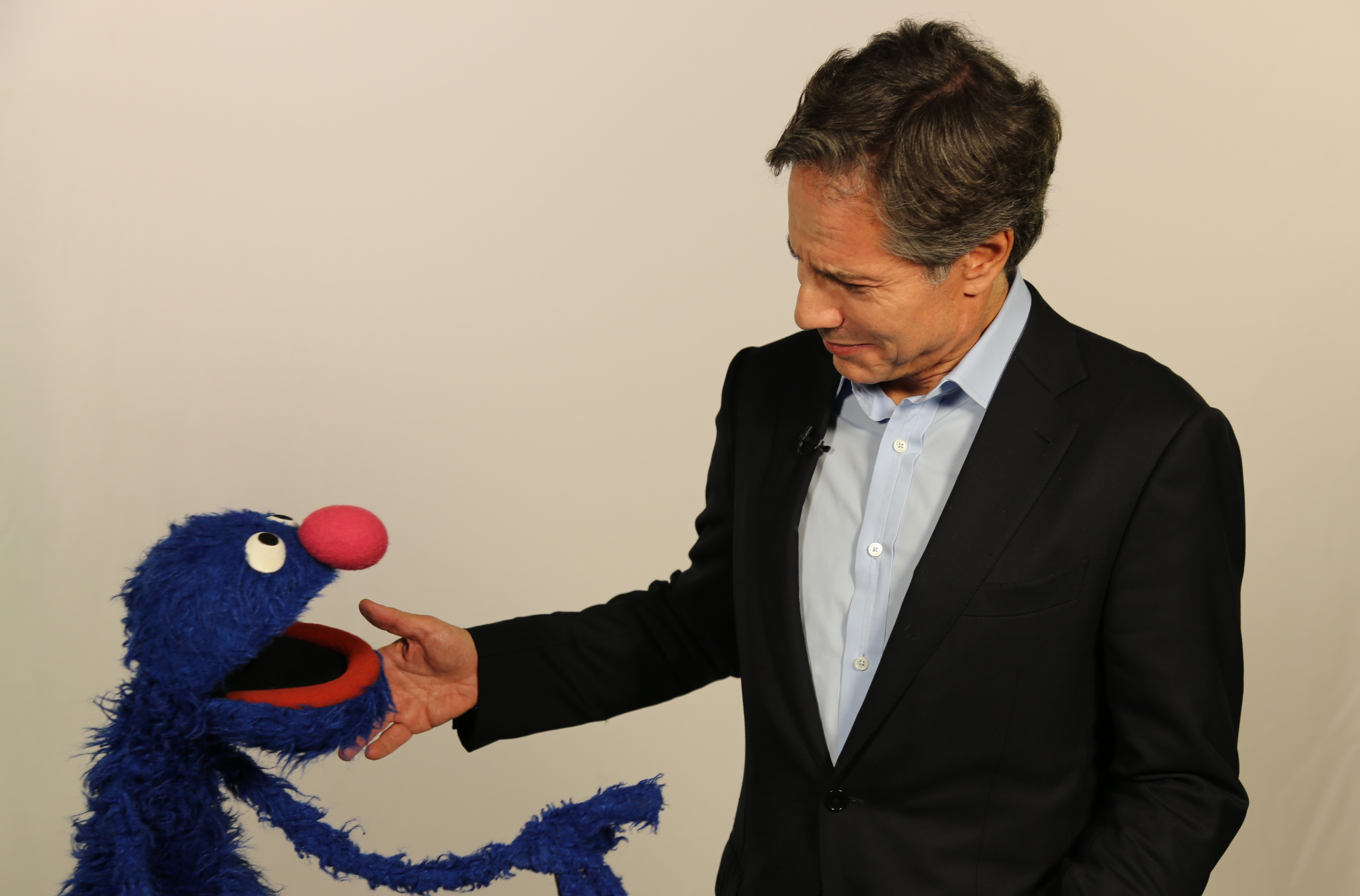
The Deputy Secretary of State Antony Blinken (right) meets with Grover to talk about refugees at the United Nations in New York City, 2016.

=== Charlie's Restaurant ===
One of the more frequent sketch segments featuring Grover involves him taking a series of customer service jobs. One of his customers is always Mr. Johnson, a balding, mustachioed customer who invariably becomes frustrated at Grover's bumbling service or insistence that Grover is serving Johnson properly despite evidence to the contrary.

The first Grover-Mr. Johnson series of sketches, set at "Charlie's Restaurant", aired in the early 1970s; here, Grover is employed as a waiter and Mr. Johnson is his customer.

The sketches followed the same basic premise: Mr. Johnson orders a menu item, Grover serves him, a disagreement results (usually) as a result of Grover's mistakes, and Grover attempts (often, more than once) to correct the mistake with varied degrees of success. The sketches served to teach the childhood audience basic concepts such as same and different, big and little, hot and cold, the alphabet, and following directions and patience, among other things. This was even parodied in an episode of Monsterpiece Theater, where Grover must keep rushing from the kitchen to tell Johnson that they had run out of parts of his order. Naturally, Alistair Cookie introduced this performance as "Much Ado About Nothing".

Repeats of the "Charlie's Restaurant" series of sketches aired for many years on Sesame Street. In the years since, new Grover-Mr. Johnson sketches have been produced, with Grover taking other customer service jobs and Mr. Johnson as his hapless customer. Every time, Mr. Johnson recognizes Grover as "that waiter from Charlie's".

Grover's jobs have ranged from a taxi driver to photographer to flight attendant to singing telegram artist. One sketch parodied the ABC television series Extreme Makeover: Home Edition where Grover began remodeling Mr. Johnson's home despite his express wishes. In another, Mr. Johnson is the only patron, and Grover is the only actor, for a production of Spider-Monster: The Musical, a parody of the musical Spider-Man: Turn Off the Dark. The play is, of course, a complete calamity and finally comes crashing down on both of them.

=== Other segments ===
Grover also has an instructional persona who wears a cap and gown to provide educational context for simple, everyday things. His lessons are often wrong, leaving himself open to correction by a group of Muppets. Combined with the failings of the Super Grover character, this means that Grover can be very self-conscious and timid. He is often a source of slapstick humor and often accidentally injures himself.

Early in the series, Grover would often greet Kermit the Frog by running up to him and shouting, "Hey, froggy babeee!" and then giving him a hard slap on the back, which knocked him over.

"Global Grover" is a more recent series of segments, in which Grover hosts a trip to a foreign country to learn about their culture and customs.

Marshal Grover was a series of sketches set in the Old West, wherein the Marshal would be confronted by various dilemmas (all minor by Old Western standards). Grover's trusty steed, Fred the Wonder Horse, typically resolved said issues...pitting his own abundant common sense against the Marshal's utter lack of same. An unseen announcer (Jerry Nelson), using a Lone Ranger-style spiel about Marshal Grover and Fred "riding out from the pages of history," introduced four of the eight stand-alone segments.

In 2010, Grover starred in a parody of an Old Spice Commercial called "Smell Like a Monster" based on "The Man Your Man Could Smell Like", albeit a clam with "two tickets to the thing you love" bit his nose and he rode a cow rather than a horse.

=== Super Grover ===
Grover has a semi-secret superhero identity as the well-meaning but inept Super Grover, sometimes presented as the alter ego of Grover Kent, "ace doorknob salesman for Acme, Inc". Originally his superhero costume consisted of a pink cape and medieval knight's helmet, with a Superman-style crest on both the cape and his T-shirt, bearing a letter "G" on his chest instead of "S". During the 1970s and 1980s, Sesame Street ran a series of Super Grover sketches spoofing the classic Adventures of Superman series (in the opening of these, his name was hyphenated "Super-Grover"). An announcer (Jerry Nelson) introduced each episode with the lines:

Presenting the further adventures of everybody's favorite hero. The man who's faster than lightning, stronger than steel, and smarter than a speeding bullet. It's... Super Grover!

With that, a fanfare sounds, Super Grover bursts through a paper wall bearing his crest, fruitlessly tries to move his helmet up off his eyes, and adds, "And I am cute, too!"

Announcer: And now, on to our story.

Super Grover: Yes! On to our story!

From there, episodes followed a simple formula: Super Grover is flying somewhere over Metro City when he hears the cries of a Muppet child in some minor distress and immediately sails in to assist. The excited child is quickly disillusioned as Super Grover crash-lands nearby. From there, Grover continues to be enthusiastic but no help whatsoever; his "dramatic" feats of strength and/or speed serve only to kill time...and also, more often than not, to exacerbate the situation. Meanwhile, the child solves the problem on their own and wanders off. By then, Grover's efforts have usually landed him in a comical predicament of his own.

Super Grover has appeared in the Sesame Street theatrical films Follow That Bird (1985) and The Adventures of Elmo in Grouchland (1999), where it is revealed he stretches his arms out and spins into his costume in homage to Wonder Woman), as well as the PBS special Don't Eat the Pictures (1983), where he first appears as regular Grover, but quickly changes into his costume in an attempt to make friends with a suit of armor (having no idea that there's no one inside it).

For Sesame Street's 41st season in 2010, the character was revamped as Super Grover 2.0, who debuted on Late Night with Jimmy Fallon, flying in and crash-landing behind the chair where he was meant to sit. His new costume consists of a Roman Centurion-style helmet with a spiked crest, a red cape, metal gauntlets and boots, a utility belt, and a black rubber vest, most of which resembles bike racing gear. Both the cape and the vest are adorned with his crest, now with a lightning bolt added behind the "G". The helmet has a hinged visor which still tends to fall over Grover's eyes, and his tagline is: Super Grover 2.0 – He Shows Up!

=== Grover's Mother ("Mommy") ===
"Grover's Mommy" plays an integral but often unrecognized role on Sesame Street. She has been seen almost exclusively in print, including the many illustrated books starring Grover. She was also occasionally seen in photographs, as a photo puppet, such as on the cover of Volume 4 of The Sesame Street Treasury. Over the course of time, her appearance has fluctuated greatly.

Her earliest known appearance as a Muppet is a 1970s sketch in which Grover speaks to the audience about being afraid of the dark. At the end of the sketch, his mom (Frank Oz) enters his room to kiss him goodnight. In this appearance, the puppet used for her is recycled from the early Grover puppet from the first season. Another early appearance (circa 1981) involves his mother (Kathryn Mullen) coming into the bathroom while Grover is telling the audience about how to take a bath.

She has more recently appeared (performed by Stephanie D'Abruzzo) in a brief Elmo's World sequence (from the "Families" episode), with her son as his alter-ego Super Grover, as her own alter-ego, "Super-Mommy". Grover crashlands, screaming "Moooommy!" and his mom follows shouting "Soooonny!" crashing on top of him. They recover, acknowledge each other, and almost hug, but they both fall down before they are able to.

== Books ==
In the children's book The Monster at the End of This Book (1971), Grover goes to great effort to keep the reader from turning the pages of the book, because there is a monster on the final page. Grover ties pages down, nails pages to the next one and builds a brick wall to block access; at the end it is discovered that the monster at the end of the book is Grover himself, who is mortified ("Oh, I am so embarrassed..."). The late 1990s saw a sequel to the book where Grover desperately tries to stop Elmo from reaching the end of the book, eventually directing him to leave the book and enter from the back. Therefore, when both of them reach the end, they wind up scaring each other.

Another popular children's book, Would You like to Play Hide & Seek in This Book with Lovable, Furry Old Grover?, had Grover trying different ways to hide from the reader, eventually getting upset and begging the reader to just say "no" they do not see him, even though he was just crouching down in a corner.

In 1974, Grover went on a learning expedition in Grover and the Everything in the Whole Wide World Museum, written by Norman Stiles and Daniel Wilcox, and illustrated by Joe Mathieu. He tours rooms such as "The Long Thin Things You Can Write with Room", as well as "The Things That Make So Much Noise You Can't Think Room". Grover wanders through "The Things That Are Light Room", returns a rock to "The Things That Are Heavy Room", and just when he wonders whether it is possible to have a museum that holds everything in the whole wide world, he comes upon a door labeled "Everything Else", which opens to take him out into the world. As of 1996, Publishers Weekly ranked the book at 79 on their list of best-selling children's paperbacks, and Lou Harry of Indianapolis Business Journal included the book on his list of 12 examples of how Muppets have qualified as quality entertainment.

The Adventures of Grover in Outer Space is a Sesame Street storybook featuring Grover that was published in 1984. When Grover Moved to Sesame Street was published in 1985. He was also featured in I Want a Hat Like That (1987, reprinted 1999).

== International ==
Sesame Street is modified for different national markets, and Grover is often renamed.

- In Afghanistan, his name is Kajkoal, meaning a bowl and refers to his mouth.
- In Brazil, he was known as Cosmo in the 70s seasons. In later decades he began to be referred to as Grover.
- In Czech Republic, he is called Bohoušek.
- In Egypt, he is called Gaafar.
- In Germany, he is Grobi, a diminutive of the German grob, meaning "rough" or "rude".
- In the member nations of the Gulf Cooperation Council, he is called Qarqor.
- In Indonesia, he is called Gatot.
- In Israel, he is called Kruvi, which is a play on the word kruv ("cabbage").
- In Latin America and Puerto Rico, he is known as Archibaldo.
- In Norway, he is known as Gunnar and voiced by Harald Mæle.
- In Pakistan, he is Banka, meaning immature or youthful.
- In Poland, he is called Florek ("Sesame Street" only).
- In Portugal, he is Gualter (Walter).
- In South Korea, he is Geurobeo (그로버), a phonetic approximation of his English name.
- In Spain, he is called Coco, which is Spanish for coconut, due to the shape of his head and mouth; and his Super Grover identity called Super Coco.
- In Turkey, he is known as Açıkgöz, meaning "leery".
