= Elmo =

Muppet character on Sesame Street

- Sesame Street character
- First appearance: We Are All Monsters (1980)
- Created by: Caroly Wilcox
- Performed by: Principal performers; Kevin Clash (1985–2012); Ryan Dillon (2013–present); see all below

In-universe information
- Species: Muppet monster
- Gender: Male
- Family: Louie and Mae (parents); Daisy (sister)
- Relatives: Mimsy (cousin); Cousin Pepe (cousin from Mexico); Elmo-noske (cousin from Japan); Elmer (cousin from Texas); Sue (aunt); Elmo's Grandma and Grandpa; Selmo (great-grandfather); Elmo's Great Grandmother; Elmo (great-great grandfather and namesake); Uncle Jack (uncle); Aunt Jill (aunt); Jesse (cousin); Chester (cousin); Chester's parents (aunt and uncle); Funella Furchester (aunt); Furgus Fuzz (uncle); Phoebe Furchester-Fuzz (cousin); Ollie (cousin)
- Nationality: American
- Fur color: Red
- Birthday: February 3 (age 3 1/2)

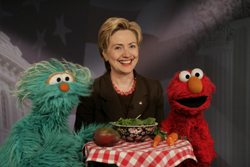
Elmo and Rosita film a PSA in 2005 with then-Senator Hillary Clinton

Elmo is a Muppet character on the children's television show Sesame Street. A furry red monster who speaks in a high-pitched falsetto voice and frequently refers to himself in the third person, he hosts the last full 15-minute segment (five minutes starting in 2017) on Sesame Street, "Elmo's World", which is aimed at toddlers. He was originally performed by Kevin Clash. Following Clash's resignation in late 2012, Elmo has been performed by Ryan Dillon.

== History ==
Elmo is self-described as three-and-a-half years old and his birthday is on February 3. Elmo characteristically avoids pronouns in reference to himself, instead referring to himself in the third person (e.g., saying "Elmo wants this" instead of "I want this"). In its FAQ, the Sesame Workshop addresses the allegation that Elmo referring to himself in the third person will teach children improper English, by stating that this behavior "mimics the behavior of many preschoolers. Like 3-year-olds, he doesn't always have the skills or knowledge to speak proper English." Sesame Street staff writer Nancy Sans once described Elmo's origins: "There was this extra red puppet lying around and the cast would pick him up sometimes and try to create a personality, but nothing seemed to materialize."

Elmo with Murray, another Sesame Street Muppet, in a video published by the National Park Service.

The character of Elmo was originally conceived as a supporting character and background character by Henson Associates-based Muppet artist/builder Caroly Wilcox in 1979, first appearing in the Sesame Street song "We Are All Monsters", which first aired in a Season 11 episode during 1980. Elmo became a named and recurring character on Sesame Street (during the street storylines) sometime later that season (episode 1439, to be exact), although he still appeared as a supporting character in segments in later episodes of the show at the time. The character was performed by a rotating ensemble of Muppet performers such as Jerry Nelson and Kathryn Mullen while he was a background character in such Sesame Street segments from 1980 to 1984. As a named character, Elmo was performed by Brian Muehl from 1980 to 1984, and later Richard Hunt from 1984 to 1985 upon Muehl's departure. However, in 1985, Hunt was so frustrated with the puppet, he squeezed it and threw it at Kevin Clash, who then performed Elmo. Clash said that Elmo should be a character who is kind and loving. Sans says of Clash, "one day in 1985, Kevin Clash, a talented puppeteer, raised him up and brought energy and life into Elmo and from that day forward we would all write for Elmo."

Modern Elmo debuted with the Season 17 premiere of Sesame Street, episode 2096 (first aired November 18, 1985, following the release of the Sesame Street film Sesame Street Presents: Follow That Bird). In the episode, Big Bird is tired of the adults refusing to believe him about Snuffy, so he decides to arrange for them to come to his nest and meet Snuffy, and Elmo offers to help. Snuffy returns, then tells Elmo he had better go home and brush his fur to prepare for the grown-ups' arrival, but Elmo holds on to his snuffle so he cannot go; as such, the adults meet Snuffy for the first time ever. Clash cites a moment later in season 17 (from Episode 2215 in which Elmo packs for an imaginary vacation) as the moment when he "found his voice" as Elmo, and by 1987, he became added to various episodes and product lines. John Tartaglia, Matt Vogel, and Jim Martin have all been secondary performers for the character, providing movement for Elmo's arms and legs, particularly in green-screen shots.

Alongside Cookie Monster, Elmo has appeared in The Furchester Hotel, where he is taking an extended stay because of his fascination with the Furchester Hotel. His father Louie is the brother of Funella Furchester. On May 27, 2020, The Not Too Late Show with Elmo premiered on Max. The series stars Elmo as the host of his own late-night talk show.

In January 2024, the X (formerly known as Twitter) account of Elmo posted a query asking users how they're doing. The post received thousands of replies and a few interventions from other Sesame Street characters. The replies were of heartwarming conversations, trauma, and dark humor. A few hours after the query, the account for Sesame Street addressed the users to mental health resources.

== Popular culture ==
As part of First Lady Michelle Obama's Let's Move! initiative, Mrs. Obama joins Sesame Street's Elmo and Rosita to announce that Sesame Workshop and the Produce Marketing Association joined the Partnership for a Healthier America in an agreement to help kids eat more fresh fruits and vegetables. October 30, 2013.

After becoming a regular guest on The Rosie O'Donnell Show, Elmo began touring the talk-show circuit. He has appeared on Martha Stewart Living, Martha, The Tony Danza Show, Rove Live, Wait Wait...Don't Tell Me!, and The View. Elmo and a developmental expert gave babysitting tips on the June 18, 2005, episode of Teen Kids News. He has also appeared on Emeril Live, helping Emeril make (non-alcoholic) eggnog during a holiday special shown in December 2008. Kevin Clash and Aaron Neville were also guests on this show. On a special episode of Oprah called "The Faces Behind the Famous Names", Kevin Clash and Elmo appeared at the same time.

Elmo was the star of the 1999 full-length, theatrically released motion picture The Adventures of Elmo in Grouchland. He also starred in the special Elmo Saves Christmas.

Elmo appeared in a fifth-season episode of The West Wing along with his friends Zoe, Rosita and Big Bird. In that episode, Elmo receives a medical checkup from Abbey Bartlet, the First Lady as part of a public-service announcement.

Elmo appeared in the eighth-season episode of Scrubs, "My ABC's", along with Oscar the Grouch, Grover, and an Anything Muppet named "Ex Ray". All four characters are in separate fantasies of J.D.'s in the episode.

At the request and with the assistance of Rep. Duke Cunningham, he testified before the House Appropriations Subcommittee on Labor, Health and Human Services and Education in April 2002, urging support for increased funding in music education.

Emeril and Elmo's Healthy Start was a special featuring Elmo and Emeril Lagasse that aired on November 4, 2005, at 8 p.m. as part of the Food Network's second annual "Cook With Your Kids Week". The special was produced in conjunction with Sesame Workshop's Healthy Habits for Life program.

In 1996, a Tickle Me Elmo doll became a fad toy.

Some traditionalist fans of Sesame Street have complained that Elmo's prominent status has caused roles to be greatly reduced for several older characters, with some referring to him as the "Little Red Menace". Some fans also blame Elmo for the semi-permanent departure of Kermit the Frog from Sesame Street.

=== Internet memes ===
Elmo has been the subject of multiple Internet memes, including one revolving around a 2004 clip in which he makes an "unhinged rant" about Rocco, the pet rock of the character Zoe, and her foolishness for believing Rocco is real, that resonated with overstressed people. Another meme, known as "Hellmo", features an image or GIF of a poorly-made Elmo birthday cake with flames in the background, making Elmo appear extremely angry or chaotic, though it can also express extreme happiness. Other GIF memes include Elmo expressing various emotions.

Another internet meme was a parody of the song Janie’s Got a Gun called Elmo Got a Gun created by Radio duo, Tommy & Rumble, in 1998. In the 2000’s the parody went viral and became a early meme on YouTube And was part of a wider trend in the 2000’s of corrupting children’s characters on the internet such as the infamous Bert is Evil meme. As well as being part of the early YouTube trend of turning Elmo evil.

== Casting history ==
=== Principal performers ===
- Kevin Clash (1985–2012)
- Ryan Dillon (2013–present)

=== Alternate performers ===
- Jerry Nelson (early 1980s)
- Kathryn Mullen (early 1980s)
- Brian Muehl (1980–1984)
- Richard Hunt (1984–1985)

=== Assistants ===
- Paul McGinnis
- John Tartaglia
- Jim Martin
- Ryan Dillon

=== International puppeteers ===
- Kōji Ochiai (Japanese NHK dub of Sesame Street)
- Kenta Matsumoto (Japanese, TV Tokyo)
- Davide Garbolino (Italian version of Elmo's World)
- Eduardo Garza (Mexican Spanish, Latin Spanish dub of Elmo's World)
- Igor Cruz (Mexican Spanish)
- Sabine Falkenberg (German)
- Hein Boele (Dutch dub of Sesamestreet)
- Jogchem Jalink (Puppeteer of the Elmo replica puppet used on the Dutch version of Sesamestreet)
- Tomasz Bednarek (Polish version of Elmo's World)
- Damon Berry (Takalani Sesame, known as "Neno")
- Christophe Albertini (5, Rue Sésame)
- Ariel Doron (Rechov Sumsum)

== See also ==
- Evil Elmo, American criminal who dressed up as Elmo
- Illeism
