= List of multimedia franchises originating in television =

Following is a list of multimedia franchises originating in television and web shows, whether animated or live-action.

In the following tables, the initial media through which the franchise characters or settings became known is shown in boldface. Only works of fiction are considered part of the series; a book or a documentary film about the franchise is not itself an installment in the franchise.

== Franchises originating in animated television and web shows ==
Franchise (Creator)	Literature	Comics	Animated films	Live action films	Animated TV	Live action TV	Video games	Other media
Adventure Time (Pendleton Ward)	yes	yes	The Adventure Time Movie (TBA)	no	**Adventure Time** (pilot 2007); Adventure Time (2010-2018); Adventure Time: Distant Lands (2020–2021); Adventure Time: Fionna and Cake (2021-)	no	yes	board and card games album Toys
The Amazing World of Gumball (Ben Bocquelet)	yes	yes	The Amazing World of Gumball: The Movie (TBA)	no	**The Amazing World of Gumball** (2011–2019); Darwin's Yearbook (2019); The Gumball Chronicles (2020–2021); The Wonderfully Weird World of Gumball (2025–present)	no	yes	Toys; Music; Theme Park Ride
Avatar: The Last Airbender (Michael Dante DiMartino and Bryan Konietzko)	yes	various	Avatar Aang: The Last Airbender (2026)	The Last Airbender (2010)	**Avatar: The Last Airbender (2005)**; The Legend of Korra (2012)	Avatar: The Last Airbender (2024)	various	Trading Card Game; Lego theme
Beavis and Butt-Head (Mike Judge)	yes	Marvel Comics series (1994–1996)	Beavis and Butt-Head Do America (1996); Beavis and Butt-Head Do the Universe (2022)	no	**Beavis and Butt-Head** (1993–present)	no	MTV's Beavis and Butt-Head (1994); Various others	The Beavis and Butt-Head Experience (1993 album)
Ben 10 (Cartoon Network)	no	yes	Ben 10: Secret of the Omnitrix (2007) Ben 10: Destroy All Aliens (2012) Ben 10 Versus the Universe: The Movie (2020) The Ben 10 Movie (TBA)	Ben 10: Race Against Time (2007) Ben 10: Alien Swarm (2009)	**Ben 10** (2005–2008); Ben 10: Alien Force (2008–2010); Ben 10: Ultimate Alien (2010–2012); Ben 10: Omniverse (2012–2014); Ben 10 (Reboot) (2016–2021)	no	yes	Action figures Toys
Blue's Clues (Traci Paige Johnson; Todd Kessler; Angela Santomero)	yes	no	Blue's Big Musical Movie (2000)	Blue's Big City Adventure (2022)	**Blue's Clues** (1996–2006); Blue's Clues & You! (2019–2024)	Blue's Room (2004–2007)	edutainment video games from Humongous Entertainment	toys albums live stage show
Bluey (Joe Brumm)	yes, several series	no	The Bluey Movie (2027)	no	Bluey (2018–present)	no	Bluey: Let's Play (2023); Bluey: The Videogame (2023)	toys, albums, other merchandise, Bluey stage show (2019–present)
BoBoiBoy (Nizam Razak)	no	yes	BoBoiBoy: The Movie (2016); BoBoiBoy Movie 2 (2019); Mechamato Movie (2022); Papa Zola The Movie (2025); BoBoiBoy Movie 3: Ghost of Gurlatan (2027)	no	**BoBoiBoy** (2011–2016); BoBoiBoy Galaxy (2016–present); Fly With Yaya (2018–2022); Papa Pipi (2019–present); Mechamato (2021–present)	no	no	Trading Card Game; Action Figures
Bob the Builder (Keith Chapman)	yes	no	various feature-length TV specials Bob the Builder (TBA)		**Bob the Builder** (1998–2004) :Project Build It (2005–2008) :Ready, Steady, Build (2010–2012); Bob the Builder (2015–2018)	no	yes	several children's songs including the series theme song various toys theme park attractions live stage show
DC Universe (DC Studios, James Gunn, and Peter Safran)	yes	yes	Krypto Saves the Day! shorts (2025-2026)	Superman (2025) numerous others	**Creature Commandos** (2024-present)	Peacemaker season 2 (2025) numerous others	TBA	DC Elseworlds
Dora the Explorer (Chris Gifford; Valerie Walsh Valdes; Eric Weiner)	yes	no	no	Dora and the Lost City of Gold (2019); Dora and the Search for Sol Dorado (2025)	**Dora the Explorer** (2000–2019); Go, Diego, Go! (2005–2012); Dora and Friends: Into the City! (2014–2016); Dora (2024)	no	multiple	toys, albums, theme park rides, apparel, live shows
Ed, Edd n Eddy (Danny Antonucci)	Yes	Yes	Ed, Edd n Eddy's Big Picture Show (2009)	Yes	Ed, Edd n Eddy (1999-2008)	yes	Ed, Edd n Eddy: Jawbreakers! (2003) Ed, Edd n Eddy: The Mis-Edventures (2005) Ed, Edd n Eddy: Scam of the Century (2007)	Toys, Theme Park, Apparel Food Products and Other Merchandise, Live Shows
The Flintstones (Hanna-Barbera)	yes	yes	The Man Called Flintstone (1966); The Flintstones & WWE: Stone Age SmackDown! (2015) Meet the Flintstones (TBA) several TV specials and movies	The Flintstones (1994); The Flintstones in Viva Rock Vegas (2000)	The Flintstones (1960–1966) several other animated series	no	yes	2 theme parks live stage show
Foster's Home for Imaginary Friends (Craig McCracken)	yes	yes	"House of Bloo's" (2004) "Good Wilt Hunting" (2006) "Destination: Imagination" (2008)	no	**Foster's Home for Imaginary Friends** (2004-2009); Foster's Funtime for Imaginary Friends (TBA)	no	multiple	Toys, other merchandise
Futurama (Matt Groening)	Futurama Presents Bender’s Guide to Life (2024); The Night Before Xmas: A Futurama Christmas Story (2025)	Futurama Comics (2000-2018)	Bender's Big Score (2007); The Beast with a Billion Backs (2008); Bender's Game (2008); Into the Wild Green Yonder (2009)	no	**Futurama** (1999-2003, 2008-2013, 2023-)	no	multiple	Calendars, figures, other merchandise
George of the Jungle (Jay Ward and Bill Scott)	no	yes	no	George of the Jungle (1997); George of the Jungle 2 (2003)	**George of the Jungle** (1967); George of the Jungle (2007)	no	George of the Jungle and the Search for the Secret (2008)	no
Gumby (Art Clokey)	no	Gumby comics Gumby: 50 Shades of Clay (2017)	Gumby: The Movie (1995)	no	**Gumbasia** (1953; short); Howdy Doody (1955–1956); The Gumby Show (1956–1969); Gumby Adventures (1988)	no	Gumby vs. the Astrobots (2005)	Gumby (1989 tribute album)
Gundam (Yoshiyuki Tomino)	numerous	List of Gundam manga and novels	Over 6 depending on criteria	G-Saviour (2000)	no	List of Gundam video games	no	Hundreds of model kits, traditional merchandise and exotic specials including a car.
Hellaverse (Vivienne Medrano)	no	Dirty Healings (2019-2020); A Day in the Afterlife (2020)	Helluva Shorts (2024-)	no	**Hazbin Hotel** (2024-), Helluva Boss (2020-)	no	no	songs, soundtracks, merchandise line, live concerts, music videos, card and board games
Inspector Gadget (Bruno Bianchi Andy Heyward Jean Chalopin)	yes	yes	Inspector Gadget: Gadget's Greatest Gadgets (2000); Inspector Gadget's Last Case (2002); Inspector Gadget's Biggest Caper Ever (2005)	Inspector Gadget (film) (1999); Inspector Gadget 2 (2002)	**Inspector Gadget** (1983–1986); Gadget Boy & Heather (1995–1998); Gadget & the Gadgetinis (2002–2003) Inspector Gadget (2015–2018)	Inspector Gadget's Field Trip (1996-1998)	multiple	various toys, podcast series
The Loud House (Chris Savino)	numerous	various graphic novels	The Loud House Movie (2021); The Casagrandes Movie (2024); No Time to Spy: A Loud House Movie (2024)	A Loud House Christmas (2021)	**The Loud House** (2016-); The Casagrandes (2019-)	The Really Loud House (2022-2024)	numerous	various toys
Masameer (Malik Nejer)	no	no	Masameer: The Movie (2020); Masameer Junior (2025)	no	**Masameer** (2011–2019); Society Awareness (2013); Awra and Laffa (2015–2016); Masameer County (2021–2023)	no	no	Theme Park Ride
Miraculous Ladybug (Thomas Astruc)	yes	yes	Ladybug & Cat Noir: The Movie (2023); Untitled Ladybug & Cat Noir: The Movie sequel (TBA); Several feature-length specials	no	**Miraculous Ladybug** (2015–present); Miraculous Chibi (2018–present); Miraculous Stellar Force (TBA)	Untitled Miraculous live-action series (TBA)	yes	A stage musical, toys, cosmetics, jewelry and other miscellaneous items
Neon Genesis Evangelion (Hideaki Anno)	no	Neon Genesis Evangelion (manga) (1994–2013)	Five films	no	**Neon Genesis Evangelion** (1995–1996)	no	several	Petit Eva: Evangelion@School dramas Music
Paw Patrol (Keith Chapman)	yes	no	Paw Patrol: The Movie (2021); Paw Patrol: The Mighty Movie (2023) Paw Patrol: The Dino Movie (2026)	no	**Paw Patrol** (2013–); Rubble & Crew (2023–)	no	yes	Toys; Live Stage Shows
The Powerpuff Girls (Craig McCracken)	no	yes	The Powerpuff Girls Movie (2002)	no	**The Powerpuff Girls** (1998-2005); Powerpuff Girls Z (2006-2007); The Powerpuff Girls (2016-2019)	no	various	merchandise
Rick and Morty (Justin Roiland and Dan Harmon)	no	yes	several short films	appearance in Space Jam: A New Legacy (unofficial)	**Doc and Mharti shorts** (2006); Rick and Morty (2013-); The Vindicators (2022); Rick and Morty: The Anime (TBA)	no	Pocket Mortys; Rick and Morty: Virtual Rick-ality	several Broadgames action figures
Rocky and Bullwinkle (Jay Ward, Alex Anderson, and Bill Scott)	no	several	Mr. Peabody and Sherman (2014); Rocky & Bullwinkle (2014)	Dudley Do-Right (1999); The Adventures of Rocky and Bullwinkle (2000)	The Adventures of Rocky and Bullwinkle and Friends (1959-1964); The Mr. Peabody & Sherman Show(2015-2017); The Adventures of Rocky and Bullwinkle (2018-2019)	no	The Adventures of Rocky and Bullwinkle and Friends (1992); Rocky and Bullwinkle (2008)	various
Rugrats (Klasky Csupo)	several	comic strip	The Rugrats Movie (1998); Rugrats in Paris: The Movie (2000); Rugrats Go Wild (2003) several TV specials	no	**Rugrats** (1991–2004); All Grown Up! (2003–2008); Rugrats Pre-School Daze (2005); Rugrats (2021 TV series) (2021-)	no	Rugrats Adventure Game (1998) numerous others	Rugrats: A Live Adventure albums toys apparel apparel
Regular show (JG Quintel)	yes	yes	Regular Show: The Movie (2015)	no	**Regular show** (2010-2017); Regular Show: The Lost Tapes (2026)	no	yes	games merchandise Toys
RWBY (Monty Oum)	no	yes	no	no	**RWBY** (2013-); RWBY Chibi (2016–2018); RWBY: Ice Queendom (2022–2023)	no	various	various stage shows
Scooby-Doo (Hanna-Barbera)	yes	yes	Scoob! (2020); various others	Scooby-Doo (2002), Scooby-Doo 2: Monsters Unleashed (2004)	**Scooby-Doo, Where Are You!** (1969–1970), 11 others	no	yes	merchandise
The Simpsons (Matt Groening)	yes	List of The Simpsons comics	The Simpsons Movie (2007) The New Simpsons Movie (2027)	no	**The Simpsons shorts** from The Tracey Ullman Show (1987–1989); The Simpsons (1989-)	no	yes	The Simpsons Ride
South Park (Trey Parker and Matt Stone)	no	no	South Park: Bigger Longer & Uncut (1999) several Paramount+ TV movies	no	**South Park** (1997-)	no	yes	Live Stage merchandise album
Space Battleship Yamato (Yoshinobu Nishizaki)	no	Cosmoship Yamato manga (1974–1975); Great Yamato manga (2000–2001)	Space Battleship Yamato (1977) and various sequels (1978–2002)	Space Battleship Yamato (2010)	**Space Battleship Yamato** (1974–1980); Star Blazers (1979–1984); Space Battleship Yamato 2199 (2013)	no	Space Battleship Yamato (1999) and sequels	Toys; Action figures pre-fabricated kits Music
Space Ghost (Alex Toth, William Hanna, Joseph Barbera)	yes	yes	Aqua Teen Hunger Force Colon Movie Film for Theaters (2007); Aqua Teen Forever: Plantasm (2022)		**Space Ghost** (1966–1967); Space Ghost Coast to Coast (1994–2008); The Brak Show (2000–2003, 2007); Aqua Teen Hunger Force (2000–2015, 2023-) several spin-offs	no	yes	Toys; Action figures Music
SpongeBob SquarePants (Stephen Hillenburg)	yes	yes	The SpongeBob SquarePants Movie (2004); The SpongeBob Movie: Sponge Out of Water (2015); The SpongeBob Movie: Sponge on the Run (2020); Saving Bikini Bottom: The Sandy Cheeks Movie (2024); Plankton: The Movie (2025); The SpongeBob Movie: Search for SquarePants (2025)	live-action scenes in films	**SpongeBob SquarePants** (1999–); Kamp Koral: SpongeBob's Under Years (2021-); The Patrick Star Show (2021-)	several scenes	yes	Toys; Action figures Music
Steven Universe (Rebecca Sugar)	yes	yes	Steven Universe: The Movie (2019)	no	**Steven Universe** (2013–2019); Steven Universe Future (2019–2020); Lars of the Stars (TBA)	no	yes	Action figures soundtracks
VeggieTales (Phil Vischer; Mike Nawrocki)	yes	VeggieTales SuperComics	Jonah: A VeggieTales Movie (2002); The Pirates Who Don't Do Anything: A VeggieTales Movie (2008) LarryBoy (2026)	no	**VeggieTales** (1993 video series) several more	no	several	several toys children's music and soundtracks podcasts live stage shows
Voltron (World Events Productions)	no	various	Voltron: Fleet of Doom (1986)	Voltron (2027)	**Voltron: Defender of the Universe** (1984–1985); Voltron: The Third Dimension (1998); Voltron Force (2010)	no	Voltron: Defender of the Universe (2011)	Toys; Action figures
Winx Club (Iginio Straffi)	yes	yes	Winx Club: The Secret of the Lost Kingdom (2007); Winx Club 3D: Magical Adventure (2010); Winx Club: The Mystery of the Abyss (2014)	no	**Winx Club** (2004–Present); PopPixie (2011); World of Winx (2016–2017)	Fate: The Winx Saga (2021–Present)	various	Merchandise; Soundtracks; Winx on Ice (2008–2010)
Yogi Bear (William Hanna, Joseph Barbera, and Ed Benedict)	yes	yes	Hey There, It's Yogi Bear! (1964); Hanna-Barbera Superstars 10	Yogi Bear (2010)	**The Huckleberry Hound Show** The Yogi Bear Show and many other series	no	many	Merchandise, Yogi Bear's Honey Fried Chicken restaurant chain, Jellystone Park

== Franchises originating in live action television and web shows ==
Franchise (Creator)	Literature	Comics	Animated films	Live action films	Animated TV	Live action TV	Video games	Other media
Ali G (Sacha Baron Cohen)	yes	no	no	Ali G Indahouse (2002); Borat (2006); Brüno (2009); Borat Subsequent Moviefilm (2020); Ali G: Who Iz I? (2026)	no	**Da Ali G Show'** (2000–2004) (though the characters of Ali G and Borat debuted on The 11 O'Clock Show in 1998 and F2F in 1997 respectively)	no	soundtracks to mentioned feature films
The Avengers (TV series) (Sydney Newman)	The Avengers (TV series)#Novels; The Avengers (1998 film)#Novelisation	The Avengers (TV series)#Comics	no	The Avengers (1998 film)	no	**The Avengers (TV series) (1961–1969)**; The New Avengers (TV series) (1976–1977)	no	The Avengers (TV series)#Radio series The Avengers (TV series)#Audio; The Avengers (TV series)#Stage play
Babylon 5 (J. Michael Straczynski)	various	various	no	no	no	**Babylon 5** (102 episodes, 1994–1998); Crusade (1999) and six TV films (1998–2007)	no	
Barney (Sheryl Leach; Kathy O'Rourke-Parker)	yes	no	no	Barney's Great Adventure (1998) several specials Barney (TBA)	Barney's World (2024)	**Barney & the Backyard Gang** (video series, 1988–1991); Barney & Friends (1992–2010); Barney Home Video series (1993–2017)	Barney's Hide & Seek Game (1993)	A Day in the Park with Barney several children's soundtracks other merchandise
Battlestar Galactica (Glen A. Larson)	various	Battlestar Galactica (comics)	no	no	no	**Battlestar Galactica** (1978–1979); Battlestar Galactica (2004–2009)	yes	
Bear in the Big Blue House (Mitchell Kriegman)	yes	no	no	no	no	**Bear in the Big Blue House** (1997–2006); Breakfast with Bear (2005–2006); Bear in the Big Blue House LIVE! (2003)	multiple	toys, albums, theme park, apparel, live stage show at Disney Junior – Live on Stage!
The Bill (Geoff McQueen)	The Bill#Novels (1984–1987)	no	no	no	no	**The Bill** (1983–2010); Burnside (TV series) (2000); Murder Investigation Team (TV series) (2003–2005)	no	The Bill#Music
Blake's 7 Terry Nation	Blake's 7#Books and magazines Avon: A Terrible Aspect	no	no	no	no	**Blake's 7** (1978–1981)	Blake's 7#Gaming	Blake's 7 (audio drama)
The Brady Bunch (Sherwood Schwartz)	no	no	no	The Brady Bunch Movie (1995); A Very Brady Sequel (1996); The Brady Bunch in the White House (2002)	The Brady Kids (1972–1974)	**The Brady Bunch** (1969–1974); The Brady Brides (1981)	no	numerous soundtracks A Very Brady Musical
Breaking Bad (Vince Gilligan)	no	yes	no	El Camino: A Breaking Bad Movie (2019) several short films	Slippin' Jimmy (2022)	**Breaking Bad** (2008-2013); Better Call Saul (2015-2022) several miniseries	Breaking Bad: Criminal Elements	podcasts
Charlie's Angels (Ivan Goff and Ben Roberts)	no	yes (1979; 2019)	no	Charlie's Angels (2000); Charlie's Angels: Full Throttle (2003); Charlie's Angels (2019)	no	**Charlie's Angels** (1976–1981); Charlie's Angels (2011)	yes (2003; 2008; 2019)	Charlie's Angels: Animated Adventures (2003)
Dad's Army (Jimmy Perry and David Croft)	Dad's Army books and memorabilia	yes	no	Dad's Army (1971 film); Dad's Army (2016 film)	A Stripe for Frazer (2016)	Dad's Army (1968–1977); Dad's Army: The Lost Episodes (2019)	no	Dad's Army (stage show); List of Dad's Army radio episodes It Sticks Out Half a Mile (1983–1984); Dad's Army Museum
Doctor Who (Sydney Newman, C. E. Webber, and Donald Wilson)	List of Doctor Who novelisations (1965–2012) various	List of Doctor Who comic stories	no	Dr. Who and the Daleks (1965); Daleks' Invasion Earth 2150 A.D. (1966)	The Infinite Quest (2007); Dreamland (2009)	**Doctor Who** (26 seasons from 1963 to 1989, new series 2005–present); one TV film and several spin-offs	various	Website animated series Radio and audio serials Stage productions
The Equalizer (Michael Sloan and Richard Lindheim)	yes	no	no	The Equalizer (2014); The Equalizer 2 (2018); The Equalizer 3 (2023)	no	**The Equalizer** (1985–1989); The Equalizer (2021–)	-	
Fraggle Rock (Jim Henson)	yes	yes	no	no	Fraggle Rock: The Animated Series (1987); The Doozers(2014–2018)	**Fraggle Rock** (1983–1987); Fraggle Rock: Rock On! (2020); Fraggle Rock: Back to the Rock (2022–)	yes	albums
Gabby's Dollhouse (Traci Paige Johnson and Jennifer Twomey)	Yes	yes	yes	Gabby's Dollhouse: The Movie (2025)	yes	Gabby's Dollhouse (2021–2025)		
Gilligan's Island (Sherwood Schwartz)	no	no	no	Rescue from Gilligan's Island (1978); The Castaways on Gilligan's Island (1979); The Harlem Globetrotters on Gilligan's Island (1981)	The New Adventures of Gilligan (1974–1975); Gilligan's Planet (1982–1983)	**Gilligan's Island** (1964–1967)	no	no
Jackass (Johnny Knoxville, Jeff Tremaine, Spike Jonze)	no	no	no	Jackass: The Movie (2002); Jackass Number Two (2006); Jackass 3D (2010); Jackass Forever (2022) spin-off films and TV specials with two of them under the Jackass presents title	no	**Jackass** (2000–2002); Wildboyz (2006–2008)	Jackass: The Game	no
Last of the Summer Wine (Roy Clarke)	Summer Wine Chronicles (1986)	Last of the Summer Wine (1983)	no	Getting Sam Home (1983); Uncle of the Bride (1986)	no	**Last of the Summer Wine** (1973–2010); First of the Summer Wine (1988–1989)	no	Stage adaptations, Audio (1995)
Mission: Impossible (Bruce Geller)	yes	several	no	Mission: Impossible film series	no	**Mission: Impossible** (1966–1973, 1988–1990)	yes	-
Monty Python	various	no	A Liar's Autobiography: The Untrue Story of Monty Python's Graham Chapman	several	no	**Monty Python's Flying Circus** several TV specials	various	Record albums
The Twilight Zone (Rod Serling)	Twilight Zone: 19 Original Stories on the 50th Anniversary (2009)	Comics	no	Twilight Zone: The Movie (1982); Twilight Zone: Rod Serling's Lost Classics (1994)	no	the original series and Reebots	The Twilight Zone (1988); Twilight Zone VR (2022)	radio drama and Stage Adaptations, Disney's Park based on series
Trailer Park Boys (Mike Clattenburg)	no	yes	no	Trailer Park Boys: The Movie (2006); Trailer Park Boys: Countdown to Liquor Day (2009); Trailer Park Boys: Don't Legalize It (2014); Standing on the Shoulders of Kitties (2024)	Trailer Park Boys: The Animated Series (2019–2020)	**Trailer Park Boys** (2001–2018); Trailer Park Boys: Out of the Park (2016–2017); Trailer Park Boys: Jail (2021)	no	Soundtrack; Live stage
Mr. Bean (Rowan Atkinson and Richard Curtis)	various	no	no	Mr. Bean Takes an Exam (1991 short); Bean (1997); Mr. Bean's Holiday (2007)	Mr. Bean: The Animated Series	**Mr. Bean** (1990–1995); Comic Relief sketches	no	Facebook videos TV commercial appearances
The Muppets (Jim Henson)	no	The Muppet Show (comics) various	no	The Muppet Movie (1979), and seven additional films	Muppet Babies (1984–1991); Muppet Babies (2018–2020)	**Sam and Friends** (1955–1961); The Muppet Show (1976–1981); Muppets Tonight (1996–1998); Muppets Now (2020)	yes	Discography, live shows
Only Fools and Horses (John Sullivan)	He Who Dares... (2015); You Know It Makes Sense, Lessons From The Derek Trotter School of Business (And Life) (2018)	no	no	no	no	Only Fools and Horses (1981–2003); The Green Green Grass (2005–2009); Rock & Chips (2010–2011)	no	Royal Variety Show (Only Fools and Horses) (1986); Comic Relief special (1997); Beckham in Peckham (2014); Only Fools and Horses The Musical (2019); Trotters Trading Game (1990)
Power Rangers/Super Sentai (Haim Saban and Shuki Levy/Shotaro Ishinomori)	no	yes	no	various Sentai Films; Mighty Morphin Power Rangers: The Movie (1995); Turbo: A Power Rangers Movie (1997)	no	**Himitsu Sentai Gorenger** (1975–1977) various **Mighty Morphin Power Rangers** (1993–1996) various	various	Power Rangers Collectible Card Game various stage shows
The Prisoner (Patrick McGoohan)	The Prisoner#Books	The Prisoner#Comics	no	no	no	**The Prisoner** (1967–1968); The Prisoner (2009 miniseries)	The Prisoner#Games	The Prisoner#Audio dramas
Quatermass (Nigel Kneale)	novelizations	no	no	**The Quatermass Experiment** (1953); Quatermass II (1955); Quatermass and the Pit (1958–59); Quatermass (1979); The Quatermass Experiment (2005)	no	The Quatermass Xperiment (1955); Quatermass 2 (1957); Quatermass and the Pit (1967); The Quatermass Conclusion (1979)	no	The Quatermass Memoirs radio series (1996); Quatermass and the Pit theatrical production (1997)
Red Dwarf (Rob Grant and Doug Naylor)	Red Dwarf: Infinity Welcomes Careful Drivers (1989); Better Than Life (1990); Last Human (1995)	Red Dwarf Magazine	no	Red Dwarf: The Promised Land (2020)	no	**Red Dwarf (1988-)**	Red Dwarf XII - The Game	Red Dwarf - The Role-playing game Dave Hollins: Space Cadet
Saturday Night Live (Lorne Michaels)	yes	yes	no	several films based on characters from recurring sketches	no	**Saturday Night Live (1975-)**	yes	soundtracks
Sesame Street (Joan Ganz Cooney and Lloyd Morrisett)	various	Sesame Street (comic strip)	no	Sesame Street Presents: Follow That Bird (1985); The Adventures of Elmo in Grouchland (1999); Sesame Street (TBA)	Mecha Builders (2022-)	**Sesame Street** (1969-); Play with Me Sesame (2002–2007); The Not-Too-Late Show with Elmo (2020-) various TV specials	various	toys, theme park, apparel, food products and other merchandise, live shows
Star Trek (Gene Roddenberry)	List of Star Trek novels	Star Trek (comics)	no	Thirteen feature films (beginning in 1979)	Star Trek: The Animated Series (1973–74); Star Trek: Lower Decks (2020-); Star Trek: Prodigy (2021-)	**Star Trek: The Original Series** (1966–69); Star Trek: The Next Generation (1987–1994); Star Trek: Deep Space Nine (1993–99); Star Trek: Voyager (1995–2001); Star Trek: Enterprise (2001–05); Star Trek: Discovery (2017–); Star Trek: Picard (2020-); Star Trek: Strange New Worlds (2022-)	numerous	-
Stranger Things (The Duffer Brothers)	various	various	no	no	Stranger Things: Tales from '85 (2026)	**Stranger Things** (2016-2025); Untitled live-action Stranger Things spin-off (TBA)	Stranger Things 3: The Game (2019) several others	Music, Stranger Things: The First Shadow, toys, apparel, food products and other merchandise
The Sweeney (Ian Kennedy Martin)	The Sweeney#Books	The Sweeney#Comics	no	Sweeney! (1977); Sweeney 2 (1978); The Sweeney (2012 film)	no	**The Sweeney** (1975–1978)	no	The Sweeney#Music
The X-Files (Chris Carter)	The X-Files literature	The X-Files (comics)	no	The X-Files (1998); The X-Files: I Want to Believe (2008)	no	**The X-Files** (1993–2002; 2016–2018); Millennium(1996–1999); The Lone Gunmen (2001)	yes	
Walking with… (Tim Haines & Jasper James)	various	no	Walking with Dinosaurs: Prehistoric Planet 3D (2014)	Walking with Dinosaurs (2013) three TV specials	several scenes	**Walking with Dinosaurs** (1999); Walking with Beasts (2001); Walking with Cavemen (2003); Sea Monsters (2003); Walking with Monsters (2005); Walking With Dinosaurs (2025)	electronic media	exhibition live theatrical show merchandise
Wishbone (Rick Duffield)	Wishbone book list	Yes	Yes	Wishbone's Dog Days of the West (1998); Wishbone (TBA)	Yes	Wishbone (1995-1997)	Yes	Toy &Merchandise
Who Wants To Be a Millionaire? (David Briggs, Mike Whitehall, Steven Knight)	multiple quiz books	no	no	Slumdog Millionaire (2008)	scrapped animated spinoff	**Who Wants To Be a Millionaire?** (1998-2014, 2018–present), alongside many international versions Millionaire Hot Seat (2009-2023); 50-50 (2008); Quiz (2020)	several	soundtrack release, board games, compilation tape, DVD game, Play It!

== See also ==
- List of fictional shared universes in film and television – many multimedia franchises are based in fictional universes
- List of public domain works with multimedia adaptations
- List of highest-grossing media franchises
- List of television series made into books
- List of international television show franchises
- Media mix
- Science fiction on television#Media fandom
