= Sesame Street (disambiguation) =

Sesame Street is an American children's television series.

Sesame Street may also refer to:

- Sesame Street (fictional location), a fictional street in Manhattan
- Sesame Street (comic strip), a comic strip based on the television series

== See also ==
- Sesame Street characters, a list of Sesame Street characters
- Sesame Street in Japan
- Sesame Street in the United Kingdom
- Rechov Sumsum – The Israeli adaptation of the American Sesame Street
- Sesame Street video games, a list of video games from the series
- Sesame Street discography
- The Sesame Street Dictionary
