= Yarob (web series) =

Saudi animated web series

Yarob (Arabic: يَعْرُب) is a Saudi animated cultural web series and one of the flagship projects of Antame, an initiative by the King Abdulaziz Foundation for Research and Archives. Released on YouTube in 2018–2019, the series is part of Saudi Arabia’s Vision 2030 cultural program and aims to bring the history and legends of the Arabian Peninsula to a modern audience through anime‑inspired animation.

== Overview ==
Produced by the Riyadh‑based studio Myrkott Animation Studio, Yarob was created and written by Abdulaziz Almuzaini, Malik Nejer and Yazid Alqarni, and directed by Malik Nejer. In interviews the creators have cited the influence of Japanese anime—particularly the works of Hayao Miyazaki—and expressed a desire to engage Arab youth and fans of animation with regional heritage and folklore.

== Name ==
The name "Yarob" was chosen to reflect the deep historical roots of the Arabian Peninsula. The region has long been home to ancient peoples, nations, battles, secrets, and legendary places—some recorded in history, others passed down through myths. The name also refers to an ancient Arab ancestor.

== Plot ==
The series follows a modest Saudi family—Yarob, his teenage sister Asrar, and their wise grandfather—as they embark on a sequence of supernatural adventures. Unbeknownst to them, Yarob is fated to oppose Al‑Harith, a mysterious figure bent on unleashing global catastrophe.

== Episodes ==
The show comprises two parts (eleven episodes in total), each exploring a different historical or legendary theme with a blend of comedy, fantasy and adventure. All episodes were published on YouTube.

=== Part 1 ===
No.	Title	Theme	Original release date
1	"Iram"	The lost city of Iram of the Pillars; Asrar steals Shaddad ibn ‘Ad’s ring.	31 May 2018
2	"Salma"	The tale of Aja and Salma; Yarob must resolve a mysterious crop blight.	3 August 2018
3	"Seven Eagles"	Legend of Luqman ibn ‘Ad’s eagles; Yarob dons an ancient warrior’s helmet.	4 October 2018
4	"Jadis"	Stories of Tasm, Jadis and Zarqa al‑Yamama; quest to replace a broken magical eye.	16 November 2018
5	"Qedar"	The Qedarite Kingdom; Yarob seeks redemption after unwittingly causing a tragedy.	28 December 2018

=== Part 2 ===
No.	Title	Theme	Original release date
6	"Al‑Faw"	Archaeological mysteries of Al‑Faw; prophecy of a dark orb.	28 June 2019
7	"Sammur"	Search for the inventor of the deadly orb; encounter with Al‑Harith.	28 June 2019
8	"Al‑Sumu’al"	The fortress of Al‑Sumu’al; Asrar discovers an ancient inscription.	5 July 2019
9	"Tarifah"	The seer Tarifah foretells danger to Sammur.	12 July 2019
10	"The Confrontation"	Yarob allies with Sammur and Tarifah to face Al‑Harith.	19 July 2019
11	"Finale"	Asrar and Tarifah strive to awaken Yarob from a dire spell.	29 July 2019

== Characters ==
=== Main ===
- Yarob: A young man in his twenties and the series’ protagonist.
- Asrar: Yarob’s sixteen‑year‑old sister.
- Grandfather: The siblings’ guardian and keeper of family lore.
- Al‑Harith: The enigmatic antagonist seeking to destroy the world.

=== Historical & Mythical Figures ===
- Shaddad ibn ‘Ad
- Aja and Salma
- Luqman ibn ‘Ad
- Zarqa al‑Yamama
- Anqaa
- Cenmar
- Samaw'al ibn 'Adiya
- Tarifah
- The jinn Shamhurash

=== Supporting ===
- The Eye of the marid
- The Blue Jinn
- Death
- Sannurah
- Majed

== Voice cast ==
- Nouraldeen Alqallalwah
- Rami Alqallalwah
- Raafat Alqallalwah
- Raghad Baydas
- Dalal AlBassam
- Abdullah Said
- Samet Goul
- Alex Twain
- Omar AlQhamdi

== Production crew ==
- Writers: Abdulaziz Almuzaini; Malik Nejer; Yazid Alqarni
- Director: Malik Nejer
- Animation: Emad AlBahrah
- Producer: Abdulaziz Almuzaini
