= List of television series made into books =

Often a television series becomes so successful and popular or attains such a cult status that the franchise produces books either directly based on it (adapted from the episode scripts) or strongly inspired by it (but describing new adventures of the characters).

== Television series ==
The following is a list of television series which were used as the basis for novels (see also Category:Novels based on television series).

Title TV series	Books	Notes	References
Angel	Angel novels		
The Avengers (TV series)	The Avengers novels		
Bagpuss	Bagpuss books		
Beauty and the Beast	Beauty and the Beast novelizations		
Being Human	Being Human novels		
Beverly Hills, 90210	Beverly Hills, 90210 novelizations		
Bewitched	Bewitched novel		
The Bill	The Bill novelizations		
The Bionic Woman	The Bionic Woman novels		
Blake's 7	Blake's 7 books and magazines		
Buffy the Vampire Slayer	Buffy the Vampire Slayer novels		
Burn Notice	Burn Notice prequel and tie-in novels		
Castle	Castle tie-in books		
Catweazle	Catweazle novels		
Charmed	Charmed novels and short stories		
Citizen Smith	Citizen Smith novelization		
Class	Class novels		
Columbo	Columbo books		
The Crystal Maze	The Crystal Maze books		
CSI: Crime Scene Investigation	CSI novels		
CSI: Miami	CSI novels		
CSI: NY	CSI novels		
Dad's Army	Dad's Army books and memorabilia		
Dallas	Dallas books		
Dark Shadows	Dark Shadows novels		
Dr. Quinn, Medicine Woman	Dr. Quinn, Medicine Woman novels		
Doctor Who	Doctor Who novelizations and other books		
Dynasty	Dynasty books		
Flight 29 Down	Flight 29 Down books		
Full House	Full House books		
The Good Life	The Good Life novelizations		
Ghost Whisperer	Ghost Whisperer novels		
Grimm	Grimm novels		
Hannah Montana	Hannah Montana books		
Highlander: The Series	Highlander: The Series novels		
Home and Away	Home and Away books		
I Dream of Jeannie	I Dream of Jeannie novel		
Life on Mars	Life on Mars novels		
Leverage (American TV series)	Leverage (American TV series) related books		
Lizzie McGuire	Lizzie McGuire books		
Luther	Luther: The Calling		
Millennium	Millennium novelizations and comics		
Mobile Suit Gundam	Gundam manga and novels		
Monk	Monk novel series		
Murder, She Wrote	Murder, She Wrote novels		
My So-Called Life	My So-Called Life Goes On		
Neighbours	Neighbours books		
Once Upon a Time	Once Upon a Time novels		
The Originals	The Originals novels		
Primeval	Primeval books and novelizations		
The Prisoner	The Prisoner novels		
Psych	Psych novels		
Quantum Leap	Quantum Leap books		
Revenge	Revenge book		
Red Dwarf	Red Dwarf novels		
Roar	Roar books		
Roswell	Roswell novels		
Round the Twist	Round the Twist tie-in book		
Sabrina, the Teenage Witch	Sabrina, the Teenage Witch books		
The Sarah Jane Adventures	The Sarah Jane Adventures books		
The Secret World of Alex Mack	The Secret World of Alex Mack book series		
The Six Million Dollar Man	Six Million Dollar Man novelizations		
Smallville	Smallville novels		
So Little Time	So Little Time books		
Space: 1999	Space: 1999 books and other media		
Space: Above and Beyond	Space: Above and Beyond books		
Star Trek	Star Trek novels		
The Sweeney	The Sweeney novels		
Teen Wolf	On Fire: A Teen Wolf Novel		
Torchwood	Torchwood novels and audio books		
The Tribe	The Tribe novels		
Twin Peaks	Twin Peaks books		
Two of a Kind	Two of a Kind books		
The Vampire Diaries	Stefan's Diaries		
Wishbone	Wishbone books		
Life on Seacrow Island	Seacrow Island		
The X-Files	The X-Files books and comics		

== Web series ==
The following is a list of web series which were used as the basis for novels.

Title Web series	Books	Notes	References
I Heart Vampires	I Heart Vampires: Birth (A Confessions of a High School Vampire Novel)		
Carmilla	Carmilla book		
Pretty Dudes	Pretty Dudes: The Novel		

== See also ==
- List of multimedia franchises originating in television
- Media mix
- List of television show franchises
