= Sirb Productions =

Saudi Arabian production company

- Type: Private
- Industry: Entertainment
- Founded: 26 October 2021; 4 years ago
- Founder: Abdulaziz Almuzaini; Malik Nejer
- Headquarters: Riyadh, Saudi Arabia
- Website: sirbproductions.com

Sirb Productions is a Saudi Arabian film production company. founded in 2021 by Abdulaziz Almuzaini and Malik Nejer. It is headquartered located in Riyadh, Saudi Arabia.

== Filmography ==
Year	Title	Director	Distributor	Notes
2023	Head to Head	Malik Nejer	Netflix	Co-production with The Creator Space
2024	Lali Nahar	Abdulaziz Almuzaini	Muvi Studios	
2025	Masameer Junior	Malik Nejer	Netflix	Co-production with Myrkott Animation Studio
