= List of international television show franchises =

Television shows remade in another country

The following is a list of international television shows franchises. These are shows remade for foreign markets rather than adaptations.

== Reality shows ==
- 10 Years Younger
- 30 Seconds to Fame
- 1000 Heartbeats
- The Amazing Race
- All Together Now
- American Inventor
- BBQ Champ
- The Apprentice
- The Bachelor
- The Bachelorette
- The Bar
- Beauty and the Geek
- Big Brother
- The Biggest Loser
- The Block
- The Bus
- The Four: Battle for Stardom
- But Can They Sing?
- Chance of a Lifetime
- Celebrity Duets
- Chains of Love
- Clash of the Choirs
- Come Dine with Me
- The Contender
- The Dating Game
- Dance Your Ass Off
- Dancing on Ice
- Dancing with the Stars
- Dating in the Dark
- Dragons' Den
- The Doctors
- Estate of Panic
- Ex on the Beach
- Expedition Robinson
- Extreme Makeover
- Entertainment Tonight
- The Face
- Face Off
- The Farm
- Fashion Star
- Farmer Wants a Wife
- Fear Factor
- Flip or Flop
- Football's Next Star
- Get the F*ck Out of My House
- Got Talent
- Got to Dance
- The Great British Bake Off
- Hell's Kitchen
- Hello Goodbye
- Hotter Than My Daughter
- Idols
- I'm a Celebrity...Get Me Out of Here!
- Iron Chef
- I Get That a Lot
- Just the Two of Us
- The Insider
- King of the Nerds
- Little Big Shots
- Lego Masters
- MasterChef
- The Marriage Ref
- The Mole
- Married at First Sight
- Momma's Boys
- More to Love
- Murder in Small Town X
- Must Love Kids
- Ninja Warrior
- Overhaulin'
- Pelotón
- Pimp My Ride
- Popstars
- Project Runway
- Ramsay's Kitchen Nightmares
- Ready Steady Cook
- The Real Housewives
- Drag Race
- Revenge Body with Khloé Kardashian
- Reality Circus
- The Rebel Billionaire: Branson's Quest for the Best
- Rising Star
- RuPaul's Drag Race
- Secret Millionaire
- Shark Tank
- Shear Genius
- The Simple Life
- Sing If You Can
- So You Think You Can Dance
- Solitary
- Splash!
- Star Academy
- Strictly Come Dancing
- Survivor
- Supernanny
- The Taste
- Temptation Island
- The Tester
- Top Chef
- Top Design
- Top Model
- Trading Spouses
- The Traitors
- Tycoon
- The Ultimate Fighter
- Unan1mous
- Undercover Boss
- Való Világ
- The Voice
- What Not to Wear
- Wife Swap
- Whose Line Is It Anyway?
- The Winner Is
- The X Factor
- Your Face Sounds Familiar

== Game shows ==
- 1 vs. 100
- 101 Ways to Leave a Gameshow
- 20Q
- 50-50
- 5 Gold Rings
- 500 Questions
- Amne$ia
- Are You Smarter than a 5th Grader?
- Anything Goes
- Beat The Blondes
- Beat the Chasers
- Beat the Star
- Boom!
- Bowling for Dollars
- Brain Wall
- Brainiest
- Can't Cook, Won't Cook
- Cash Battle
- Cash Cab
- Catch 21
- The Chair
- The Chamber
- Chance of a Lifetime
- The Chase
- Clueless
- The Colour of Money
- Countdown
- The Crystal Maze
- The Cube
- Deal or No Deal
- Dialing for Dollars
- Distraction
- Divided
- Dog Eat Dog
- Don't Ask Me Ask Britain
- Don't Forget the Lyrics!
- Don't Lose the Money
- Eggheads
- Ellen's Game of Games
- Every Second Counts
- Everybody's Equal
- Family Feud
- Five Minutes to a Fortune
- The Floor
- Fort Boyard
- Friend or Foe?
- Gameshow Marathon
- Going for Gold
- Grand Slam
- Greed
- Guesstimation
- The Guillotine / The Legacy
- Hollywood Squares
- I Can See Your Voice
- I Love My Country
- I Survived a Japanese Game Show
- Identity
- In It to Win It
- It's Not What You Know
- Jeopardy!
- The Kids Are All Right
- Knowitalls
- Let's Make a Deal
- Lingo
- The Lyrics Board
- Mastermind
- Match Game / Blankety Blank
- Mental Samurai
- Million Dollar Minute
- Million Dollar Password
- The Million Pound Drop / Million Dollar Money Drop
- Minute to Win It
- The Moment of Truth
- My Dad Is Better than Your Dad
- Name That Tune
- Only Connect
- Opportunity Knocks
- Peking Express
- Password
- Pictionary
- The People Versus
- The People's Quiz
- The Phone
- Pointless
- PokerFace
- Power of 10
- The Price Is Right
- Pyramid
- Queen for a Day
- A Question of Genius
- Quizmania
- The Quiz with Balls
- Raid the Cage
- Rebound
- Red or Black?
- Reflex
- Riot
- Rolling In It
- Russian Roulette
- Sale of the Century
- Scream! If You Know the Answer
- Set for Life
- Show Me the Money
- The Singing Bee
- Singled Out
- Spin Star
- Super Fan
- Supermarket Sweep
- Take It or Leave It
- Taken Out
- Takeshi's Castle
- Test the Nation
- That's the Question
- Tic-Tac-Dough
- Touch the Truck
- Trust
- Twenty One
- The Vault
- Vendredi tout est permis
- The Wall
- The Weakest Link
- The Wheel
- What? Where? When?
- Wheel of Fortune
- Who Wants to Be a Millionaire?
- Who Wants to Be a Millionaire? Hot Seat
- The Whole 19 Yards
- Who's Still Standing?
- Winning Lines
- Wipeout
- XXS
- You Deserve It

== Sitcoms ==
=== All in the Family / Till Death Us Do Part ===
Original name: Till Death Us Do Part
Origin: United Kingdom
Date started: 1965
Date ended: 1975
Creator: Johnny Speight (Norman Lear is credited as "creator" in U.S. adaptation and most U.S. spinoffs)
First network to broadcast: BBC One
First network to adapt: United States
Related series (UK): The Thoughts of Chairman Alf, Nobody's Perfect
Related series (US): Maude, The Jeffersons, Gloria, 704 Hauser
Second-generation related series (US): Good Times, Checking In

Region/country	Local name	Network	Dates aired	Starring
United Kingdom	Till Death Us Do Part	BBC One	1965–1968, 1970, 1972–1975	Warren Mitchell as Alf Garnett
United Kingdom	Till Death...	ITV	1981	Warren Mitchell as Alf Garnett
United Kingdom	In Sickness and in Health	BBC One	1985–1992	Warren Mitchell as Alf Garnett
United States	All in the Family	CBS	1971–1979	Carroll O'Connor as Archie Bunker
United States	Archie Bunker's Place	CBS	1979–1983	Carroll O'Connor as Archie Bunker
Germany	Ein Herz und eine Seele	WDR, ARD	1973–1976	Heinz Schubert as Alfred Tetzlaff
Netherlands	In voor en tegenspoed	VARA	1991–1997	Rijk de Gooyer as Fred Schuit

=== The Beverly Hillbillies ===
Original name: The Beverly Hillbillies
Origin: United States
Date started: 1962
Date ended: 1971
Creator: Paul Henning
First network to broadcast: CBS
Related series: Petticoat Junction, Green Acres

=== Bewitched ===
Original name: Bewitched
Origin: United States
Date started: 1964
Date ended: 1972
Creator: Sol Saks
First network to broadcast: ABC
First country to adapt: India (2002)

Region/country	Local name	Network	Starring	Date premiered	Notes
Argentina	Hechizada	Telefé	Florencia Peña, Gustavo Garzón, Georgina Barbarrosa	2007	
Chile	La Hechizada	Mega			In production; air date TBD
India	Meri Biwi Wonderful	SET		2002	
Mexico	Chica Brujada	Televisa	Martina Stoessel, Ximena Herrera, Angelica Vale, Eugenio Derbez & Sebastian Rulli	TBD	In production; air date TBD
Japan	Oku-sama wa majo (My Wife is a Witch)	Tokyo Broadcasting System	Ryōko Yonekura	2004	The Japanese title was also title used for the US series when it aired in Japan
Russia	Моя любимая ведьма (My Favourite Witch)	TV3	Anna Zdor as Nadia (Samantha), Ivan Grishanov, as Ivan (Darrin) and Marina Esepenko as Nadia's mother	2009	
United Kingdom	Bewitched	BBC	Sheridan Smith, Tom Price, Frances de la Tour	2008	Pilot was made, but has not been commissioned or greenlighted yet
United States	Bewitched	ABC	Elizabeth Montgomery, Dick York (1964–1969), Dick Sargent (1969–1972), Agnes Moorehead	1964–1972	

- Note: The Japanese anime series Oku-sama wa Mahō Shōjo: Bewitched Agnes (My Wife is a Magical Girl: Bewitched Agnes) and Sally, the Witch were homages to Bewitched, not a remake or an updated reimagining of the US series.

=== The Brady Bunch ===
Original name: The Brady Bunch
Origin: United States
Date started: 1969
Date ended: 1974
Creator(s): Sherwood Schwartz
First network to broadcast: ABC
Related series: The Brady Kids, The Brady Bunch Hour, The Brady Brides, The Bradys, plus two TV movies and two feature films

=== Cheers ===
Original name: Cheers
Origin: United States
Date started: September 30, 1982
Date ended: May 20, 1993
Creator(s): James Burrows, Glen Charles, Les Charles
First network to broadcast: NBC
Related series: The Tortellis, Frasier

=== The Cosby Show ===
Original name: The Cosby Show
Origin: United States
Date started: September 20, 1984
Date ended: July 9, 1992
Creator(s): Ed. Weinberger, Michael Leeson, Bill Cosby
First network to broadcast: NBC
Related series: A Different World

=== Diff’rent Strokes ===
Original name: Diff'rent Strokes
Origin: United States
Date started: 1978
Date ended: 1986
Creator(s): Bud Yorkin
First network to broadcast: NBC
Related spin-off series: The Facts of Life
Related series: Hello, Larry, Silver Spoons, Double Trouble, It's Your Move

=== Easy Aces ===
Original name: Easy Aces
Origin: United States
Date started: 1930
Date ended: 1945
Creator: Goodman Ace
First network to broadcast: CBS Radio Network
First country to adapt: Canada

Region/country	Local name	Network	Dates aired
United States	mr. ace and JANE	CBS, DuMont	1948–50
Canada	The Trouble with Tracy	CTV	1970–71

=== Free Agents ===
Original name: Free Agents
Origin: United Kingdom
Date started: 2007
Creator: Chris Niel
First network to broadcast: Channel 4
First country to adapt: United States (2011)

Region/country	Local name	Network	Starring	Date premiered	Notes
United Kingdom	Free Agents	Channel 4	Stephen Mangan and Sharon Horgan	2007–2010	
United States	Free Agents	NBC	Hank Azaria and Kathryn Hahn	2011	Niel is also co-producer on this version.

=== The Golden Girls ===
Original name: The Golden Girls
Origin: United States
Date started: 1985
Date ended: 1993
Creator: Susan Harris
First network to broadcast: NBC
First network to adapt: United Kingdom
Related series: Empty Nest, Nurses

Region/country	Local name	Network	Starring	Date premiered	Notes
Egypt	سكر زيادة	Dubai TV and MBC Masr	Mai El Gheity, Hala Fakher, Samiha Ayoub, Nabila Ebeid, Nadia Al-Gindi	2020	
Chile	Los años dorados	UCV Televisión	Gloria Münchmeyer, Carmen Barros, Ana Reeves, Consuelo Holzapfel	2015–2016	
United States	The Golden Girls	NBC	Beatrice Arthur, Estelle Getty, Rue McClanahan, Betty White	1985–1992	
United States	The Golden Palace	CBS	Beatrice Arthur, Estelle Getty, Rue McClanahan, Betty White	1992–1993	Picked up by CBS after Bea Arthur left the show and retooled
United Kingdom	Brighton Belles	ITV	Sheila Hancock, Wendy Craig, Sheila Gish, Jean Boht	9 March 1993	Only lasted 11 episodes
Russia	Большие Девочки; Bolshie Devochki		Galina Petrova, Olga Ostroumova, Valentina Telechkina, Elena Milloti	2006	
Greece	Χρυσα Κοριτσια; Chrysa Koritsia	ET1	Mirka Papakonsantinoy, Dina Konsta, Eleni Gerasimidou, Ivonni Maltezoy	2008–2009	
Spain	Las chicas de oro	TVE	Concha Velasco, Carmen Maura, Lola Herrera, Alicia Hermida	2010	
Israel	בנות הזהב; Bnot HaZahav; Banot Hazahav	Channel 10	Hanna Laslo, Miki Kam	2011	
The Netherlands	Golden Girls: Golden Girls	RTL 4	Loes Luca, Beppie Melissen, Pleuni Touw, Cecile Heuer	2012	

=== Desperate Housewives ===
Original name: Desperate Housewives
Origin: United States
Date started: 2004
Date ended: 2012
Creator: Marc Cherry
General Manager: Giovanni Mastrangelo
Production companies: ABC Studios
Disney–ABC International Television
Distributor: Disney–ABC Domestic Television
First network to broadcast: ABC
First network to adapt: Argentina (2006)
Related series: Devious Maids

Title	Region(s)	Release	Network(s)
Amas de Casa Desesperadas	Argentina	2006–07	Canal 13
Amas de Casa Desesperadas	Colombia; Ecuador	2007	RCN TV (Colombia); Teleamazonas (Ecuador)
Donas de Casa Desesperadas	Brazil	2007–08	RedeTV!
Umutsuz Ev Kadınları	Turkey	2011–14	Kanal D (2011–12); FOX Turkey (2012–14)
Desperate Housewives Africa	Nigeria	2015	EbonyLife TV
Desperate Housewives: The Game		2017	Megazebra

=== Doogie Howser, M.D. ===
Original name: Doogie Howser, M.D.
Origin: United States
Date started: 1985
Date ended: 1989
Creator: Steven Bochco & David E. Kelley
First network to broadcast: ABC
Rebooted version: Doogie Kameāloha, M.D. (2021; character is nicknamed after the original series character's nickname)

=== Rules of Engagement ===
Original name: Rules of Engagement
Origin: United States
Date started: 2007
Date ended: 2013
Creator: Tom Hertz
First network to broadcast: CBS
First country to adapt: Poland (2012)

Region/country	Local name	Network	Starring	Date premiered	Notes
Poland	Reguły Gry	TVN, TVN 7	Julia Kamińska, Maciej Zakościelny	2012	2012
United States	Rules of Engagement	CBS	Patrick Warburton, Megyn Price	2007	2013

=== The King of Queens ===
Original name: The King of Queens
Origin: United States
Date started: 1998
Date ended: 2007
Creator: Michael J. Weithorn
David Litt
First network to broadcast: CBS
First country to adapt: Russia (2011)

Region/country	Local name	Network	Date premiered	Notes
Russia	Молодожёны; Newlyweds	СТС	2011	2012
United States	The King of Queens	CBS	1998	2007

See also

- Молодожёны (2011–2012), Russian adaptation of the sitcom The King of Queens.
- Newlyweds (2011–2012), Russian adaptation of the sitcom The King of Queens.

=== Happy Days ===
Name: Happy Days Original name: New Family in Town (original pilot)
Origin: United States
Date started: February 25, 1972
Date ended: September 24, 1984
Creator: Garry Marshall
First network to broadcast: ABC
Related series: Laverne & Shirley, Blansky's Beauties, Mork & Mindy, Out of the Blue, Joanie Loves Chachi
Second-generation related series: The Fonz and the Happy Days Gang, Laverne & Shirley in the Army, Mork & Mindy/Laverne & Shirley/Fonz Hour
Other franchise ties: Love, American Style

=== Kath & Kim ===
Original name: Kath & Kim
Origin: Australia
Date started: 2002
Creator: Jane Turner and Gina Riley
First network to broadcast: ABC (Australia)
First country to adapt: United States (2008)

Region/country	Local name	Network	Starring	Date premiered	Notes
Australia	Kath & Kim	ABC	Jane Turner and Gina Riley	2002–2004	
Australia	Kath & Kim	Seven Network	Jane Turner and Gina Riley	2007–2008	Picked up by Seven after ABC refused to renew the show
United States	Kath & Kim	NBC	Molly Shannon and Selma Blair	2008	Turner and Riley are also co-producers on this version.

=== The Nanny ===
Original name: The Nanny
Origin: United States
Date started: 1993
Date ended: 1999
Creator: Fran Drescher
First network to broadcast: CBS
First country to adapt: Turkey (2001)

Region/country	Local name	Network	Star (as "Fran Fine" counterpart)	Date premiered
Argentina	La Niñera	Telefé	Florencia Peña as Florencia Finkel	2004
Chile	La Nany	Mega	Alejandra Herrera as Eliana Tapia Cárdenas "Nany"	2005
Ecuador	La Niñera	Ecuavisa	Paola Farías as María "Mary"	2005
Greece	Η Νταντά	Mega Channel	Maria Lekaki (Μαρία Λεκάκη) as Mary	2003–2005
Indonesia	De Neny	Indosiar		2005
Mexico	La Niñera	TV Azteca	Lisset as Francisca Flores	2007
Poland	Niania	TVN	Agnieszka Dygant as Frania Maj	2005
Russia	Моя прекрасная няня ("My Fair Nanny")	STS	Anastasia Zavorotnyuk (Анастасия Заворотнюк) as Vicka	2004
Turkey	Dadı	Show TV	Gülben Ergen as Melek	2001
United States US English	The Nanny	CBS	Fran Drescher as Fran Fine	1993–1999
United States US Spanish	La Mujercita Niñera	Univision	Giselle Blondet	starting in 2017

=== Married... with Children ===
Original name: Married... with Children
Origin: United States
Date started: 1987
Date ended: 1997
Creator: Michael G. Moye and Ron Leavitt
First network to broadcast: Fox
First country to adapt: Germany (1993)

=== Modern Family ===
Original name: Modern Family
Origin: United States
Date started: 2009
Date ended: 2020
Creator: Christopher Lloyd and Steven Levitan
First network to broadcast: ABC
First country to adapt: Iran, as Haft Sang (2014; 20th Century Fox did not authorize the production of this series, and it is a frame-by-frame remake of the American version.)

=== Man with a Plan ===
Original name: Man with a Plan
Origin: United States
Date started: 2016
Date ended: 2020
Creator: Jackie Filgo
Jeff Filgo and Jackie and Jeff Filgo
First network to broadcast: CBS
First country to adapt: Ukraine, as Батько рулить / Папа рулит

Country/language	Local title	Channel	Date aired/premiered	End date
Ukraine	Батько рулить / Папа рулит	TET	October 26, 2020	

=== Phua Chu Kang Pte Ltd ===
Original name: Phua Chu Kang Pte Ltd
Origin: Singapore
Date started: 1997
Date ended: 2007
Creator(s): Andrea Teo, Kenneth Lang
First network to broadcast: MediaCorp TV Channel 5
First country to adapt: Malaysia, as Phua Chu Kang Sdn Bhd (2010)
Related series: Living with Lydia, Calefare

=== Sit Down, Shut Up ===
Original name: Sit Down, Shut Up
Origin: Australia
Date started: 2001
Date ended: 2001
Creator: Tim McLoughlan and Brendan Reed
First network to broadcast: Ten Network
First country to adapt: United States (2009)

Region/country	Local name	Network	Starring	Date premiered	Notes
Australia	Sit Down, Shut Up	Ten Network	Marg Downey, Stephen Curry, Jacqueline Brennan, Christopher Brown, Jodie Dry, Paul Gleeson, Taylor Kane, Tim Mcloughlan, Brendan Reed	2001	
United States	Sit Down, Shut Up	Fox	Will Arnett, Maria Bamford, Jason Bateman, Will Forte, Tom Kenny, Nick Kroll, Cheri Oteri, Kenan Thompson, Henry Winkler	2009	Animated

=== Steptoe and Son / Sanford and Son ===
- Original name: Steptoe and Son
- Original name: Sanford and Son
- Origin: United Kingdom
- Date started: 1962
- Date ended: 2016
- Creator: Ray Galton and Alan Simpson
- First network to broadcast: BBC 1
- First country to adapt: United States
- Related series: Sanford Arms, Grady, Sanford

=== White Van Man ===
Original name: White Van Man
Origin: United Kingdom
Date started: 2010
Date ended: 2012
Creator: Adrian Poynton
First network to broadcast: BBC Three
First country to adapt: United States (2012)

Region/country	Local name	Network	Starring	Date premiered	Notes
United Kingdom	White Van Man	BBC Three	Will Mellor, Joel Fry, Georgia Moffett, Naomi Bentley, Clive Mantle	2010–2012	
United States	Family Tools	ABC	Kyle Bornheimer, J.K. Simmons, Leah Remini	2012	Poynton is also a co-creator on this version.

== Soap operas and telenovelas ==
=== Betty La Fea ===
- Original name: Yo soy Betty, la fea / Betty La Fea
- Origin: Colombia
- Date started: 1999
- Date ended: 2001
- Creator: Fernando Gaitán
- First network to broadcast: RCN TV
- First country to adapt: Turkey (2005)
- Spinoff series: Eco Moda, Betty Toons, Betty, la fea: la historia continúa

Country	Language	Name	Network	Protagonist	Date premiered	Date ended
Algerian	Algerian Arabic	طيموشة (Timoucha)	ENTV	Mina Lachter	24 April 2020	9 May 2021
Belgium	Dutch	Sara	vtm	Veerle Baetens	25 September 2007	29 June 2008
Brazil	Portuguese	Bela, a Feia	Rede Record	Giselle Itié	4 August 2009	2 June 2010
China	Mandarin Chinese	丑女无敌 (Chou Nu Wu Di)	Hunan Satellite TV	Li Xinru	September 2008	
Czech Republic	Czech	Ošklivka Katka	TV Prima	Kateřina Janečková	3 March 2008	20 April 2009
Ecuador	Spanish	Veto al Feo	Ecuavisa	Efraín Ruales	16 April 2013	26 April 2013
Egypt	Arabic	هبة رجل الغراب (Heba Regl El-Ghorab)	OSN, CBC2, MBC 1	Amy Samir Ghanem	1 January 2014	14 October 2014
Georgia	Georgian	გოგონა გარეუბნიდან (Gogona Gareubnidan)	Imedi TV	Tina Makharadze	24 May 2010	21 October 2012
Germany	German	Verliebt in Berlin	Sat.1	Alexandra Neldel	28 February 2005	12 October 2007
Greece	Greek	Maria, i Aschimi	Mega Channel	Aggeliki Daliani	1 January 2007	23 June 2008
India	Hindi	Jassi Jaissi Koi Nahin	SET India	Mona Singh	1 September 2003	4 May 2006
Israel	Hebrew	אסתי המכוערת; Esti HaMekho'eret	Channel 2	Riki Blich	3 July 2003	2006
Malaysia	Malay	Misi Betty	TV9	Siti Fazurina	2011	
Mexico	Spanish	El amor no es como lo pintan*	TV Azteca	Vanessa Acosta	2000	
Mexico	Spanish	La Fea Más Bella	Televisa	Angélica Vale	2006	2007
Netherlands	Dutch	Lotte	Talpa	Nyncke Beekhuyzen		
Philippines	Filipino	I ♥ Betty La Fea	ABS-CBN	Bea Alonzo	8 September 2008	24 April 2009
Poland	Polish	BrzydUla	TVN	Julia Kamińska	October 2008	December 2009
Portugal	Portuguese	Tudo por amor**	TVI	Sofia Duarte Silva	2002	2003
Russia	Russian	Не родись красивой / Ne Rodis Krasivoy	STS	Nelly Uvarova	5 September 2005	7 July 2006
Croatia; Serbia	Croatian; Serbian	Не дај се, Нина; Ne daj se, Nina	RTL Televizija; FOX Televizija	Lana Gojak	29 October 2007 (SRB); 3 January 2008 (CRO)	3 March 2008 (SRB); 4 August 2008 (CRO)
South Africa	English	uBettina Wethu	SABC1	Farieda Metsileng	2021	-
Spain	Spanish	Yo soy Bea	Telecinco	Ruth Núñez	2006	2008
Thailand	Thai	ยัยเป็ดขี้เหร่ Ugly Betty Thailand	ThairathTV	Piyarat Kaljaruek	9 March 2015	7 September 2015
Turkey	Turkish	Sensiz Olmuyor	Show TV, Kanal D	Özlem Conker, Yeliz Şar		
Ukraine	Ukrainian	Моя улюблена Страшко	1+1	Irina Poplavskaya	30 August 2021	27 October 2021
United States	English	Ugly Betty	ABC	America Ferrera	28 September 2006	14 April 2010
United States	Spanish	Betty en Nueva York	Telemundo	Elyfer Torres	6 February 2019	12 August 2019
Vietnam	Vietnamese	Cô Gái Xấu Xí	VTV3	Nguyễn Ngọc Hiệp	11 February 2008	31 March 2009

*The Mexican Telenovela "El amor no es como lo pintan" was accused of being a plagiarism of the "Yo soy Betty, la fea".**Remake of "El amor no es como lo pintan".

=== Jassi Jaissi Koi Nahin ===
(There's No One Like Jassi) (2003, SET, India): Mona Singh as Jasmeet Walia. The Indian version is not so much about beauty and ugliness, as about a simple middle-class girl with strong family values being catapulted into the amoral world of high fashion upper society, although Jassi was made to appear ugly by having on thick rimmed glasses, braces and an unsightly hairstyle. Jassi Jaissi Koi Nahin concluded in 2006.

=== Sensiz Olmuyor ===
Turkey's "Sensiz Olmuyor" (Won't Work Without You) told the story of Gönül and Arda on two separate TV networks, with each channel showing thirteen episodes. When the weekly series debuted on Show TV in January 2005, Özlem Conker played Gönül (which means 'heart' in Turkish), the intelligent swan in ugly duckling clothing, and pop star Emre Altuğ appeared as her boss and love interest, Arda. The show did not go on hiatus when it was moved from Show TV to rival network Kanal D, but there was one big change: Yeliz Şar took over the role of Gönül, but the rest of the original cast remained intact.

=== Verliebt in Berlin ===
In February 2005, the German TV network, SAT 1, began airing a version called Verliebt in Berlin (The title is a word-play and can mean either In Love in Berlin or In Love with Berlin), starring local soap opera star Alexandra Neldel as Lisa Plenske and Swiss actor Mathis Künzler as David. The show had 5 million viewers daily and was extended beyond its initial 250-episode run in early 2006.

A few weeks later it was announced that the show would be renewed for a second season, but without Neldel and Künzler. The focus shifted onto a male lead character named Bruno Plenske (Lisa's half-brother, played by Tim Sander). Without Alexandra Neldel, however, the show lost much of its original appeal and dwindling ratings led to its cancellation in 2007. Verliebt in Berlin has also been broadcast in dubbed versions in Hungary (as Lisa csak egy van) and France (as Le destin de Lisa). Although Verliebt in Berlin continued with new featured characters and original storylines, it is still credited as "based on Yo Soy Betty La Fea".

=== Ne Rodis' Krasivoy ===
(Be Not Born Beautiful, from the Russian phrase, "be not born beautiful, but be born happy", "Ne Rodis' Krasivoy, Rodis' Shchastlivoy")

In 2005, STS broadcasting in Russia created a version of the show called Ne Rodis' Krasivoy starring Nelly Uvarova in the title role of Katya. This version was also broadcast throughout the former Soviet Union.

=== La Fea Más Bella ===
(The Most Beautiful Ugly Woman) (2006–2007, Televisa, Mexico): Angélica Vale as Leticia Padilla Solis.

The Mexican Televisa television network, produced its version La Fea Más Bella ("The Prettiest Ugly"), which debuted on 23 January 2006 and ended on 25 February 2007. In the United States, the series aired on Univision, and in the Philippines it was broadcast on ABC 5, where it debuted on 24 April 2006 and concluded on 25 June 2007. It was also aired in Lebanon on the Lebanese MTV network from 2009 to 2010. In both these versions, the protagonist's nickname is "Lety", which is also the name of the show in Lebanon.

=== Lotte ===
(2006, Talpa, Netherlands): Nyncke Beekhuyzen as Lotte Pronk. In 2006, the Dutch TV network Talpa began airing Lotte, starring Nyncke Beekhuyzen as the main character and Lars Oostveen as Vico Maesland.

=== Yo Soy Bea ===
Despite the original Colombian production already being in Spanish, Telecinco launched an adaptation in Spain called Yo soy Bea in July 2006. The Spanish version title (which translates to "I am Bea") is a pun, with "Bea" sounding like both fea ("ugly") and bella ("beautiful"), and being the short version of the protagonist name, Beatriz. Ruth Núñez played Beatriz Pérez Pinzón and Alejandro Tous was Álvaro Aguilar, the company boss.

The Spanish adaptation screens weekdays at 6:00 pm and pulls in an average of more than four million viewers (more than +35% share of the audience). The series' record is a 42,1% of share. It has become Spain's top-rated daytime programme. Ruth Núñez, known to Spanish viewers for her portrayal of a Yugoslav student in teen soap, Compañeros, plays the heroine.

In this version, Beatriz Pérez Pinzón (Núñez) is an unattractive 26-year-old economist whose looks aren't important to her. She's intelligent and kind, and one day, after having cared for her widower father for two years, she decides to look for a job. Although she's very well educated, she gets only a secretary job at the magazine "Bulevar 21". She becomes the secretary of Álvaro Aguilar (Alejandro Tous), the company boss. In the company, Bea will be against Cayetana (Mónica Estarreado), Álvaro's fiancée, and her friend Bárbara (Norma Ruiz), who is also Álvaro's secretary. The Spanish Version won a TP de Oro to "La mejor telenovela" in 2007.

=== Ugly Betty ===
The American production was broadcast on ABC in the United States from 28 September 2006 to 14 April 2010. This production also aired internationally on Citytv and Radio-Canada (as Chère Betty) in Canada, Channel 4 in the United Kingdom; 2007, RTÉ Two in Ireland, TV2 in New Zealand, Seven Network/7Two in Australia, TVB Pearl in Hong Kong, Nova Television in Bulgaria, 8TV in Malaysia, Studio 23 in the Philippines and STAR World in Asia (Southeast Asia, India, Philippines and Middle East feeds).

In 2004, actress Salma Hayek's production company, Ventanarosa, in a joint venture with Reveille Productions and ABC Television Studio bought the rights to Betty la fea, converting it to an English-language seriocomedy series. ABC would acquire the series under the title Ugly Betty, and initially slated the program for broadcasting in summer of 2006 as a daily series, but its success led to ABC slating it as a weekly series. The hour-long program aired Fridays at 9:00 pm (Eastern time); the first episode was broadcast 28 September 2006. Actress America Ferrera portrayed the title character Betty Suarez – an unattractive, but efficient editorial assistant at a fashion magazine.

=== Maria, i Aschimi ===
Mega Channel in Greece is airing its own version titled Maria, i Aschimi (Μαρία, Η Άσχημη – Maria, The Ugly One) starring Aggeliki Daliani and Anthimos Ananiadis . Maria exudes intelligence, humor, and kindness, but what she is missing is conventional beauty. She considers her appearance to be an obstacle in her search for employment, despite her collection of degrees, which are displayed proudly by her parents, Kaiti and Irakles. Having no luck in her job search, Maria decides to try for a job for which she is overqualified, secretary to Alexis Mantas, the director of a noted fashion house called Ecomoda. Alexis is the most coveted bachelor in Athens, but he has recently gotten engaged to Markella, who tries to get him to choose her best friend, Lilian, to be his secretary and to keep an eye on him. Lilian doesn't have Maria's natural intelligence or fine education, but she has a beautiful appearance, which makes her a better superficial fit at the fashion house.

This adaptation was originally supposed to start airing on 1 November 2006, but within two weeks of that date the show was removed from Mega Channel's schedule. Finally, it began on 1 January 2007 at 21:00 and although it was scheduled to move at 18:15 two weeks later, due to its high ratings (± 45% according to Agb Hellas and more than 2 million viewers) finally remained in the prime-time slot of the channel.

=== Sara ===
The Flemish adaptation is called Sara, starring Veerle Baetens as Sara De Roose. The show was first broadcast on 25 September 2007 by VTM, a Flemish commercial TV-station. Sara was broadcast daily (except weekends) at 6:25 pm. On Sunday, VTM aired 'the week of Sara' at 9:25 pm, containing all the episodes of that week. Sara had a weekly audience between 650,000 and 750,000 viewers. The show ended in June 2008.

Sara works for 'Presence', where she falls in love with her boss Simon Van Wyck (Gert Winckelmans). Actors such as like Veerle Baetens, Sandrine André, Kürt Rogiers, Gert Winckelmans and Bieke Ilegems appeared on the show.

On 13 February 2008, the nominees of the Flemish TV-stars were announced. 'Sara' was nominated for 3 awards. Veerle Baetens, who plays Sara, and Sandrine Andre, who plays Britt, were both nominated in the category Best Actor or Actress. The show was nominated in the category Best Fiction programme. Veerle Baetens won in her category and also won the award as 'Most popular TV personality'. The show won the award for 'Most Popular TV Programme'.

=== Ne daj se, Nina ===
A version of Betty la Fea made by Croatian RTL Televizija and Serbian Fox Televizija begins production in October 2007. The working title of the show is "Ne daj se, Nina" ("Don't give up, Nina"). After a long audition, newcomer Lana Gojak has been cast in the role of Nina (Betty). Other reported cast members include established actors such as Robert Kurbaša, Edvin Livarić, Bojana Ordinačev, Petar Ćiritović, Andrija Milošević, Kristina Krepela and Sloboda Mićalović.

=== Ošklivka Katka ===
(Ugly Kate) (2008, TV Prima, Czech Republic): Kateřina Janečková as Kateřina Bertoldová. The series debuted on 3 March 2008 and it airs Mondays and Wednesdays at prime time.

=== Cô gái xấu xí ===
The Vietnamese version of Yo soy Betty, fea premiered on 11 February 2008. The series stars Ngọc Hiệp as Huyền Diệu and Chi Bảo as An Đông, the new president of SB Brands Trading J.S.C.. A number of real-life models co-starred in prominent roles, such as Nguyễn Bình Minh (who plays Tiến Mạnh), who competed in the 2002/03 Manhunt International competition and finished in the top ten; Phi Thanh Vân (as Phương Trinh), who worked as a top model and has freely admitted that she owes her beauty to the wonders of plastic surgery; Lý Anh Tuấn (Đăng Dương); and Trịnh Kim Chi (Huyền Thư). This adaptation is one of the most faithful remakes of the Colombian original so far, with episodes being recreated practically scene for scene, with only minor adjustments to account for cultural differences.

=== I Love Betty La Fea ===
Filipina actress Bea Alonzo was chosen to play the title role of Betty Pengson and actor John Lloyd Cruz to play Armando Solis in the Philippine adaptation of the famous Colombian telenovela. The series started airing on 8 September 2008 on ABS-CBN network in primetime. Former beauty queen and actress Ruffa Gutierrez, plays the role of Daniela, the female version of Daniel from the original series. In this version, they are working for an advertising agency. This is the only version where Betty refused to have a makeover. She accepted herself in the end.

=== Chou Nü Wu Di ===
This soap opera, Ugly Wudi (literally "The Ugly Without Rival" for the name Wudi means Non-Rival, unconquerable, unbeatable or matchless), is a co-production of Televisa México, China's Hunan Satellite TV, the independent producer Nesound, and the Colombian network RCN Television. The program began broadcasting on 28 September 2008 and will be divided into five seasons of 80 half-hour chapters. The show has received some criticism via 3,300 comments on Baidu and newspaper articles stating the actress who plays Wudi isn't ugly enough, despite gaining weight and exhibiting glasses, braces and tan skin which is considered unattractive in China. Some even suggested that the name of the show be changed to Pretty Wudi.

Despite criticisms, the debut episode was watched by 73 million viewers. The show is sponsored by Unilever's Dove brand, which is woven into the plot as Wudi works on a Dove advertising campaign. The show has also been used as a way to launch Dove's Campaign for Real Beauty in China.

Four seasons of Chounu Wudi have been aired in China. The 4th season started on 20 February 2010. It was named as the final season of Chounu Wudi.

=== BrzydUla ===
Poland's adaptation of the Betty story, BrzydUla (play on words: Brzydula means ugly girl but Ula is a reference to main character's name), premiered on 6 October 2008 on the TVN network. This version stars Julia Kamińska as Ula Cieplak and Marek Włodarczyk as her father, Józef. Ula works for Marek Dobrzański (played by Filip Bobek) at a prestigious Warsaw fashion house called Dom Mody Febo & Dobrzański.

=== Bela, a Feia ===
After months of speculation, the Brazilian TV network Record officially announced on 22 May 2009 that Mexican-Brazilian actress Giselle Itié would portray Bela, the protagonist of the Brazilian version of Yo soy Betty, la Fea. The extensive cast included Ana Roberta Gualda, André Mattos, André Segatti, Angela Leal, Aracy Cardoso, Bemvindo Sequeira, Bia Montez, Bruno Ferrari, Bárbara Borges, Carla Regina, Cláudio Gabriel, Daniel Erthal, Denise Del Vecchio, Esther Góes, Gabriela Moreira, Henri Pagnocelli, Ildi Silva, Iran Malfitano, Jonas Bloch, João Camargo, Laila Zaid, Luiza Thomé, Marcela Barrozo, Natália Guimarães, Pérola Faria, Raul Gazolla, Simone Spoladore, Sérgio Hondjakoff, Sérgio Menezes, Sílvia Pfeifer, and Thierry Figueira, with guest appearances by Babi Xavier, Gracyanne Barbosa, Rogério Fróes, Sérgio Mallandro, and Viviane Araújo. The series was produced by Record in partnership with Mexico's Televisa, which produced La Fea más bella. The story was adapted by scribe Gisele Joras and the series was directed by Edson Spinello. The novela premiered on 4 August 2009, and ended on 2 June 2010.

=== Gogona Gareubnidan ===
Georgia's version of the Betty story began on 24 May 2010, about one month after the U.S.A.'s Ugly Betty ended. The first episode was a pretty faithful remake of the pilot episode for Ugly Betty, with only minor changes, making this the first series to be adapted directly from the American Ugly Betty and not the Colombian Yo soy Betty, la fea. The series stars Tina Makharadze as Tamuna and takes place in Tbilisi, the Georgian capital (Tamuna lives in the outskirts, hence the show's title, which translates as "Girl from the Suburbs"). The first season consisted of 10 episodes and concluded on 26 July 2010. The second ran from 8 October 2010 through 31 December 2010, and consisted of 13 episodes. The second season diverged even farther from the story lines of Ugly Betty than the first season had, but many details within various episodes were directly or loosely based on details from second, third, and fourth season episodes of Ugly Betty. The third season began on 11 February 2011 without the show's leading man, Tornike Gogrichiani, who played Tamuna's boss, Nika Kekelidze. Gogrichiani was absent from the season's first four episodes and it was rumored online that he may be leaving the series altogether.

=== ยัยเป็ดขี้เหร่ Ugly Betty Thailand ===
A story of Pet (Thai: เป็ด; meaning 'Duck') (Pratchayanan "Babymind" Suwanmani), a young girl who looks ugly but is very capable. She works as a secretary for Danai (Wasin "Ko" Atsawanaruenat), who is a young playboy and the son of CEO of POSH Inc., a high-end cosmetics company and Ngamkhae (Nicole Theriault). Danai is the new CEO but things are not as they seem, because Danai has competition from the managing director Alisa "Alice" Phalakon (Sonia Couling) and the Phalakon family who holds shares of his company, Pet also has problems resulting from Danai's previous secretary, a young and beautiful woman.

=== El amor no es como lo pintan ===
- Original name: El amor no es como lo pintan
- Origin: Mexico
- Date started: 2000
- Date ended: 2001
- Creator(s): Eric Vonn
- Company(s): TV Azteca
- First network to broadcast: Azteca Trece
- First country to adapt: Israel as Esti HaMekho'eret (2003)

=== Ellas son...la Alegría del Hogar ===
- Original name: Ellas son...la Alegría del Hogar
- Origin: Mexico
- Date started: 2009
- Date ended: 2010
- Creator(s): Gloria Calzada, Juan Meyer, and Salvador Rizo
- Company(s): Televisa Internacional
- First network to broadcast: Televisa
- First country to adapt: United States as Devious Maids (2013)

Region/country	Local name	Network	Date premiered	Date ended
United States	Devious Maids	Lifetime	2013	2016
Turkey	Hizmetçiler	Kanal D	2020	2020

=== La indomable ===
- Original name: La indomable
- Origin: Venezuela
- Date started: 1974
- Date ended: 1974
- First network to broadcast: Radio Caracas Televisión
- First country to adapt: Mexico, as La Venganza (1977)
- Related series: Marimar (1994, remake by Televisa), MariMar (2007)

=== Juana la virgen ===
- Original name: Juana la virgen
- Origin: Venezuela
- Date started: 2002
- Date ended: 2003
- Creator: Perla Farias
- First network to broadcast: Radio Caracas Televisión
- First country to adapt: India (2005) as co-production between United States and Mexico (2013)

Region/country	Local name	Network	Protagonist	Date premiered	Date ended
Mexico/United States/Venezuela	La Virgen de la Calle	Televisa; UniMas RCTV Productions	María Gabriela de Faría	2013	2013
India	Ek Ladki Anjaani Si	Sony Entertainment Television	Kanchi Kaul	2005	2007
Turkey	Hayat Mucizelere Gebe	Kanal D	Damla Colbay	2015	2016
Greece	Parthena Zoi Παρθένα Ζωή	ANT1	Sofina Lazaraki	2017	2018
Israel	Bat-El Habetula Bat-El Habetula (Bat-El the Virgin, in Hebrew בתאל הבתולה) BatEl HaBetula	Hot (Israel)	Meshi Kleinstein	2019	2019
Poland	Majka	TVN	Joanna Osyda	2010	2010
South Korea	Miss Mom Jane Miss Mom Jae-in (미쓰맘 제인)	Channel A			
United States	Jane the Virgin	The CW	Gina Rodriguez	2014	2019
Venezuela	Juana la virgen	Radio Caracas Televisión	Daniela Alvarado	2002	2003

=== Amar después de amar ===
- Original name: Love after Loving / Amar después de amar
- Origin: Argentina
- Date started: 2017
- Date ended: 2017
- First network to broadcast: Telefe
- First country to adapt: Mexico (2017)

Region/country	Local name	Network	Date premiered	Date ended
Lebanon	تانغو Tango	LBCI Lebanon; LDC; MBC Group; LDC; Hawas Tv; Rotana Drama; OSN Yahala; Roya TV	2018	2018
Mexico	Caer en tentación	Las Estrellas	2017	2018
Portugal	Amar Depois de Amar	TVI	2019	2019
Spain	El nudo	Atresplayer Premium; Antena 3	2019	2020
Greece; Cyprus	ΕΡΩΤΑΣ ΜΕΤΑ ΕΡΩΤΑΣ ΜΕΤΑ Έρωτας μετά Erotas Meta Erotas meta Erotas Meta ΕΡΩΤΑΣ ΜΕΤΑ Erotas meta Erotas meta Έρωτας μετά	Alpha TV	2019	2020

=== L'onore e il rispetto ===
- Original name: L'onore e il Rispetto
- Origin: Italy
- Date started: 2006
- Date ended: 2017
- Creator: Salvatore Samperi
  Luigi Parisi
  Alessio Inturri
- First network to broadcast: Canale 5
- First country to adapt: Turkey (2014)

Region/country	Local name	Network	Date premiered	Date ended
Turkey	Şeref Meselesi	Kanal D	2014	2015
Italy	L'onore e il rispetto	Canale 5	2006	2017

=== Mi Gorda Bella ===
- Original name: Mi Gorda Bella
- Origin: Venezuela
- Date started: 2002
- Date ended: 2003
- Creator: Carolina Espada
- First network to broadcast: Radio Caracas Televisión
- First country to adapt: India (2004)
- Related series (adapted from the original): Dekho Magar Pyaar Se, Llena de amor

Region/country	Local name	Network	Protagonist	Date premiered	Date ended
India	Dekho Magar Pyaar Se	STAR Plus	Shweta Agarwal, Shraddha Nigam	2004	2005
Malaysia	Manjalara	TV3	Emelda Rosmila	2007	2008
Mexico	Llena de amor	Televisa	Ariadne Díaz	May 3, 2010	February 13, 2011
Venezuela	Mi Gorda Bella	Radio Caracas Televisión	Natalia Streignard	2002	2003
United States	Fat and Beauty	ABC	Cassi Davis	In development	

=== La ronca de oro ===
- Original name: La ronca de oro
- Origin: Colombia
- Date started: 2014
- Date ended: 2014
- First network to broadcast: Caracol Televisión
- First country to adapt: Egypt (2015)

Region/country	Local name	Protagonist	Date premiered	Date ended
Egypt	طريقي مسلسل طريقي	Sherine	2015	2015

=== My Lovely Sam Soon ===
- Original name: My Lovely Sam Soon
- Origin: South Korea
- Date started: 2005
- Date ended: 2005
- Creator: Kim Do-Wo
- First network to broadcast: MBC
- First country to adapt: Philippines, as Ako si Kim Samsoon (2008)

=== Two Wives ===
- Original name: Two Wives
- Origin: South Korea
- Date started: 2009
- Date ended: 2009
- Creator: Lee Yoo-seon
- First network to broadcast: SBS
- First country to adapt: Philippines

=== Sorelle ===
- Original name: Sorelle
- Origin: Italy
- Date started: 2017
- Date ended: 2017
- Creator: Ivan Cotroneo, Monica Rametta
- First network to broadcast: Rai 1
- First country to adapt: Egypt (2019)

Region/country	Local name	Network	Protagonist	Date premiered	Date ended
Egypt	زي الشمس	MBC Masr	Dina El Sherbiny	2019	2019
Italy	Sorelle	Rai 1	Anna Valle	2017	2017

=== Mentre ero via ===
- Original name: Mentre ero via (While I Was Away)
- Origin: Italy
- Date started: 2019
- Date ended: 2019
- Creator: Ivan Cotroneo, Monica Rametta
- First network to broadcast: Rai 1
- First country to adapt: Egypt (2020)

Region/country	Local name	Network	Protagonist	Date premiered	Date ended
Egypt	لعبة النسيان	MBC Masr	Dina El Sherbiny	2020	2020
Italy	Mentre ero via	Rai 1	Vittoria Puccini	2019	2019

=== Terminales ===
- Original name: Terminales
- Origin: Mexico
- Date started: 2008
- Date ended: 2008
- Creator: Ricardo Tadeo Álvarez Canales
  Miguel Ángel Fox Muller
  María del Socorro González Ocampo
  Pedro Armando Rodríguez Montes
  Marco Antonio Lagarde Bedolla
  Patricio Saiz Valenzuela
- First network to broadcast: Televisa
- First country to adapt: Spain (2010)

Region/country	Local name	Network	Protagonist	Date premiered	Date ended
Egypt	حلاوة الدنيا	Hend Sabry	2017	2017	
Spain	Quiero vivir	Cuatro	2010	2010	
Mexico	Terminales	Ana Claudia Talancón	Televisa	2008	2008
United States	Chasing Life	Italia Ricci	ABC Family	2014	2015

=== Resistire ===
- Original name: Resistiré
- Origin: Argentina
- Date started: 2003
- Date ended: 2003
- Creator: Gustavo Belatti
  Mario Segade
- First network to broadcast: Telefe
- First country to adapt: Mexican (2006)

Region/country	Local name	Network	Protagonist	Date premiered	Date ended
Egypt	سيرة حب	Beelink Productions	Cyrine Abdelnour; Maxim Khalil	2014	2014
United States	Watch Over Me	MyNetworkTV	Dayanara Torres	2006	2007
Mexico	Amar sin límites	Canal de las Estrellas	Karyme Lozano	2006	2007
Portugal	Resistirei	SIC	Paulo Rocha	2007	2008

=== El regreso de Lucas ===
- Original name: El regreso de Lucas The Return of Lucas
- Origin: Argentina
- Date started: 2016
- Date ended: 2016
- Creator and Writer: Bruno Luciani
  Martín Méndez
- First network to broadcast: Telefe
  América Televisión
- First country to adapt: Egypt (2018)

Region/country	Local name	Network	Date premiered	Date ended
Egypt	كأنه إمبارح	Beelink Productions; Eagle Films	2018	2018

=== Acacias 38 ===
- Original name: Acacias 38
- Origin: Spain
- Date started: 2015
- Date ended: 2021
- Creator: Josep Cister Rubio
  Susana López Rubio
  Aurora Guerra
  Miquel Peidró
- First network to broadcast: La 1
- First country to adapt: Egypt (2018)

Region/country	Local name	Network	Date premiered	Date ended
Egypt	ليالي أوجيني Eugénie Nights مسلسل ليالي أوجيني eugenie nights مسلسل ليالي أوجيني Layali Eugenie	Beelink Productions; Eagle Films	2018	2018

=== Gran Hotel ===
- Original name: Gran Hotel
- Origin: Spain
- Date started: 2011
- Date ended: 2013
- Creator: Ramón Campos
  Gema R. Neira
- First network to broadcast: Antena 3
- First country to adapt: Italy (2015)

Region/country	Local name	Network	Date premiered	Date ended
Egypt	جراند أوتيل	Beelink Productions; Eagle Films; CBC	2016	2016
Mexico	El hotel de los secretos	Televisa; Las Estrellas; Univision	2016	2016
United States	Grand Hotel	ABC	2019	2019
France	Grand Hôtel	TF1	2020	2020
Italy	Grand Hotel	Rai 1	2015	2015

=== Карамель ===
- Original name: Карамель Karamel Caramel
- Origin: Russia
- Date started: 2011
- Date ended: 2011
- First network to broadcast: TV-3
- First country to adapt: Lebanon (2017)

Region/country	Local name	Date premiered	Date ended
Lebanon	كاراميل	2017	2017
Russia	Карамель	2011	2011

=== Polseres vermelles ===
- Original name: Polseres vermelles The Red Band Society
- Origin: Spain
- Date started: 2011
- Date ended: 2013
- Creator: Albert Espinosa
- Executive producers: Albert Espinosa
  Pau Freixas
- Distributor: Filmax International
- First network to broadcast: TV3
- First country to adapt: Italy (2014)

Region/country	Local name	Network	Date premiered	Date ended
Egypt	مسلسل الشريط الاحمر الشريط الاحمر الشريط الأحمر alsharit al'ahmar (الشريط الأحمر)	Middle East Television	2018	2018
Peru	Pulseras rojas	América Televisión	2015	2015
Chile	Pulseras rojas	TVN	2014	2014
France	Les Bracelets rouges	TF1	2018	2018
Germany	Club der roten Bänder	VOX	2015	2015
Italy	Braccialetti rossi	Rai 1	2014	2014
Russia	Красные браслеты	Channel One	2017	2017
Slovakia	Červené pásky	Markíza	2020	2020
Ukraine	Красные браслеты	STB	2017	2017
United States	Red Band Society	Fox	2014	2014

=== Primera dama ===
- Original name: Primera dama The First Lady
- Origin: Chile
- Date started: 2010
- Date ended: 2011
- Creator: Sebastián Arrau
- Distributor: Latin Media Corporation
- First network to broadcast: Canal 13
- First country to adapt: Colombia (2011)

Region/country	Local name	Network	Date premiered	Date ended
Egypt	السيدة الأولى مسلسل السيدة الاولى السيدة الأولى	Middle East Television	2014	2014
Colombia	The First Lady	Caracol Televisión	2011	2012
United States	First Lady	The CW	In Development	In Development

=== Drop Dead Diva ===
- Original name: Drop Dead Diva
- Origin: United States
- Date started: 2009
- Date ended: 2014
- Creator: Josh Berman
- First network to broadcast: Lifetime
- First country to adapt: Russia (2013)

Region/country	Local name	Date premiered	Date ended
Egypt	طلعت روحي	OSN	March 4, 2018
Russia	До смерти красива	СТС	October 7, 2013

== Primetime dramas ==
=== 24 ===
Original name 24
Origin: United States
Date started: November 5, 2001
Creator: Joel Surnow, Robert Cochran
First network to broadcast: FOX
First country to adapt: India (24, 2013)
Related series: 24: Conspiracy, 24: Redemption, The Rookie, 24: Live Another Day, 24: Legacy

=== 9-1-1 ===
Original name: 9-1-1
Origin: United States
Date started: January 3, 2018
Date ended: Present
Creator: Ryan Murphy, Brad Falchuk & Tim Minear
First network to broadcast: FOX
Related series: 9-1-1 and 9-1-1: Lone Star, 9-1-1: Nashville

=== Arrowverse ===
Original name: Arrow Arrowverse
Origin: United States
Date started: October 10, 2012
Creator: Greg Berlanti, Andrew Kreisberg, Marc Guggenheim, Phil Klemmer & Geoff Johns
First network to broadcast: The CW
Related series: The Flash, Constantine, Vixen, Legends of Tomorrow, Supergirl, Black Lightning, Batwoman and Superman & Lois

=== Babylon 5 ===
Original name: Babylon 5
Origin: United States
Date started: February 22, 1993
Date ended: November 25, 1998
Creator: J. Michael Straczynski
First network to broadcast: PTEN
Related series: Crusade, plus six TV films

=== Battlestar Galactica ===
Original name: Battlestar Galactica
Origin: United States
Date started: September 17, 1978
Date ended: April 29, 1979
Creator: Glen A. Larson
First network to broadcast: ABC
Related series: Galactica 1980, Battlestar Galactica (2004), Caprica, three TV films

=== Breaking Bad ===
Original name: Breaking Bad
Origin: United States
Date started: January 20, 2008
Date ended: September 29, 2013
Creator: Vince Gilligan
First network to broadcast: AMC
Related series: Talking Bad, Better Call Saul, Talking Saul, El Camino: A Breaking Bad Movie, The Broken and the Bad, Slippin' Jimmy
First country to adapt: Colombia (Metástasis, 2014)
Other franchise ties: The X-Files, The Walking Dead

=== Chicago Fire ===
Original name: Chicago Fire
Origin: United States
Date started: October 10, 2012
Date ended: Present
Creator: Dick Wolf, Matt Olmstead, Michael Brandt, and Derek Haas
First network to broadcast: NBC
Other franchise ties: Law & Order
Related series: Chicago P.D., Chicago Med, and Chicago Justice

=== Criminal Minds ===
Original name: Criminal Minds
Origin: United States
Date started: September 22, 2005
Creator(s): Jeff Davis
First network to broadcast: CBS
Related series: Criminal Minds: Suspect Behavior, Criminal Minds: Beyond Borders

=== CSI ===
Original name: CSI: Crime Scene Investigation
Origin: United States
Date started: October 6, 2000
Date ended: Ongoing
Creator: Anthony Zuiker
First network to broadcast: CBS
Related series: CSI: Miami, CSI: NY, Without A Trace, Cold Case, CSI: Cyber and CSI: Vegas

=== Dallas ===
Original name: Dallas
Origin: United States
Date started: April 2, 1978
Date ended: May 3, 1991
Creator: David Jacobs
First network to broadcast: CBS
Related series: Knots Landing, Dallas (2012), two TV films

=== Doctor Who ===
Original name: Doctor Who
Origin: United Kingdom
Date started: 23 November 1963
Date ended: ongoing
Creator: Sydney Newman, C.E. Webber (and others)
First network to broadcast: BBC
First country to adapt: United States (1996; considered part of continuing series because Sylvester McCoy passed the role to Paul McGann in the TV pilot)
Related series: K-9 & Company, Torchwood, The Sarah Jane Adventures, Class, two films produced in the 1960s, Big Finish audio dramas

=== The Equalizer ===
Original name: The Equalizer
Origin: United States
Date started: September 23, 1985
Date ended: May 2, 1989
Creator: Michael Sloan and Richard Lindheim
First network to broadcast: CBS
Second generation related series: The Equalizer (2021 reboot), plus two films (2014 and 2018)

=== ER ===
Original name: ER
Origin: United States
Date started: September 19, 1994
Date ended: April 2, 2009
Creator: Michael Crichton
First network to broadcast: NBC
Other franchise ties: Third Watch and Medical Investigation

=== Grey's Anatomy ===
Original name: Grey's Anatomy
Origin: United States
Date started: March 27, 2005
Creator: Shonda Rhimes
First network to broadcast: ABC
Related series: Private Practice and Station 19

=== Hawaii Five-O ===
Original name: Hawaii Five-O
Origin: United States
Date started: September 20, 1968
Date ended: April 5, 1980
Creator: Leonard Freeman
First network to broadcast: CBS
Second generation related series: Hawaii Five-0 (2010 reboot; acknowledges ties to the original)
Second generation other franchise ties: NCIS: Los Angeles, MacGyver, Magnum P.I.

=== Kung Fu ===
Original name: Kung Fu
Origin: United States
Date started: February 22, 1972
Date ended: April 26, 1975
Creator: Ed Spielman, Jerry Thorpe and Herman Miller
First network to broadcast: ABC
Spin-off series: Kung Fu: The Legend Continues (1993–1997)
Second generation related series: Kung Fu (2021 reboot)

=== L.A. Law ===
Original name: L.A. Law
Origin: United States
Date started: September 15, 1986
Date started: May 19, 1994
Creator:
First network to broadcast: NBC
Other franchise ties: Civil Wars and L.A. Law: The Movie

=== Law & Order ===
Original name: Law & Order
Origin: United States
Date started: September 13, 1990
Date ended: Ongoing
Creator: Dick Wolf
First network to broadcast: NBC
Other franchise ties: The X-Files, Chicago
First country to adapt: France (Paris enquêtes criminelles, 2007)
Related series: Law & Order: Special Victims Unit, Law & Order: LA, Law & Order: Criminal Intent, Law & Order: UK, Law & Order: Trial by Jury, Law & Order, Crime & Punishment, Conviction, Homicide: Life on the Street and Law & Order: Organized Crime

=== Magnum, P.I. ===
Original name: Magnum, P.I.
Origin: United States
Date started: December 11, 1980
Date ended: May 8, 1988
Creator: Donald P. Bellisario, Glen A. Larson
First network to broadcast: CBS
Second generation related series: Magnum P.I. (2018 reboot; acknowledges ties to the original)
Second generation other franchise ties: Hawaii Five-0

=== Matlock ===
Original name: Matlock
Origin: United States
Date started: September 23, 1986
Date ended: May 7, 1995
Creator(s): Dean Hargrove, Joel Steiger, Joyce Burditt
First network to broadcast: NBC
Related series: Jake and the Fatman and Diagnosis: Murder

=== Medical Investigation ===
Original name: Medical Investigation
Origin: United States
Date started: September 9, 2004
Date ended: March 25, 2005
Creator: Jason Horwitch
First network to broadcast: NBC
Other franchise ties: Third Watch

=== NCIS ===
Original name: JAG
Origin: United States
Date started: September 23, 1995
Date ended: Ongoing
Creator(s): Donald P. Bellisario
First network to broadcast: NBC
Related series: First Monday, NCIS, NCIS: Los Angeles, Hawaii Five-0, MacGyver, NCIS: New Orleans, NCIS: Hawaiʻi, Scorpion and NCIS: Sydney

=== NYPD Blue ===
Original name: NYPD Blue
Origin: United States
Date started: September 21, 1993
Date ended: March 1, 2005
Creator(s): Steven Bochco, David Milch
First network to broadcast: ABC
Related series: Public Morals

=== Once Upon a Time ===
Original name: Once Upon a Time
Origin: United States
Date started: October 23, 2011
Date ended: May 18, 2018
Creator: Edward Kitsis and Adam Horowitz
First network to broadcast: ABC (United States, as they are the co-producers), although CTV in Canada aired it an hour before the US telecast during its first three seasons, which would make them the first international network to air the series
Related series: Once Upon a Time in Wonderland
Other franchise ties: Lost and Disney-related franchises

=== The Practice ===
Original name: The Practice
Origin: United States
Date started: March 4, 1997
Date ended: December 8, 2008
Creator: David E. Kelley
First network to broadcast: ABC
Related series: Boston Legal and Boston Public
Other franchise ties: Ally McBeal

=== Sons of Anarchy ===
Original name: Sons of Anarchy
Origin: United States
Date started: September 3, 2008
Date ended: December 9, 2014
Creator: Kurt Sutter
First network to broadcast: FX
Related series: Mayans M.C.

=== Star Trek ===
Original name: Star Trek
Origin: United States
Date started: 1966 (TV series); 1979 (film series)
Date ended: ongoing (TV); ongoing (film)
Creator: Gene Roddenberry
First network to broadcast: NBC
Related series: Star Trek: The Animated Series, Star Trek: The Next Generation, Star Trek: Deep Space Nine, Star Trek: Voyager, Star Trek: Enterprise, Star Trek: Discovery, Star Trek: Lower Decks, Star Trek: Prodigy, Star Trek: Picard, Star Trek: Short Treks, Star Trek: Strange New Worlds, Star Trek: Starfleet Academy plus a film series (14 films as of 2025) and two aftershows (After Trek and The Ready Room)

=== Stargate: SG-1 ===
Original name: Stargate SG-1
Origin: United States
Date started: July 27, 1997
Date ended: March 13, 2007
Creator: Brad Wright & Jonathan Glassner
First network to broadcast: Showtime
Related series: Stargate Infinity, Stargate Atlantis, Stargate Universe and Stargate Origins

=== Walker, Texas Ranger ===
Original name: Walker, Texas Ranger
Origin: United States
Date started: April 21, 1993
Creator(s): Christopher Canaan, Albert S. Ruddy, Leslie Greif, Paul Haggis, Aaron Norris, Chuck Norris
First network to broadcast: CBS
Related series: Sons of Thunder, Martial Law, Early Edition, Walker

=== The Walking Dead ===
Original name: The Walking Dead
Origin: United States
Date started: October 31, 2010
Date ended: November 20, 2022
Creator: Frank Darabont
First network to broadcast: AMC
Related series: Talking Dead, Fear the Walking Dead, The Walking Dead: World Beyond, Tales of the Walking Dead, The Walking Dead: Dead City, The Walking Dead: Daryl Dixon, The Walking Dead: The Ones Who Live

=== The X-Files ===
Original name: The X-Files
Origin: United States
Date started: September 10, 1993
Creator: Chris Carter
First network to broadcast: Fox
Related series: The Lone Gunmen, Millennium
Other franchise ties: Law & Order

=== Yellowstone ===
Original name: Yellowstone
Origin: United States
Date started: June 20, 2018
Creator: Taylor Sheridan
First network to broadcast: Paramount Network
Related series: 1883, 1923, Marshals
Other franchise ties: Mayor of Kingstown, Tulsa King, Special Ops: Lioness, Lawmen: Bass Reeves, Landman

== Anime ==
A number of Anime TV shows have been both long running, and produced various individual titles existing in the same universe, as part of the franchise

=== Gundam ===
Original name: Mobile Suit Gundam
Origin: Japan
Date started: April 7, 1979
Creator: Hajime Yatate
Related series: Mobile Suit Gundam, Mobile Suit Zeta Gundam, Mobile Suit Gundam ZZ, Mobile Suit SD Gundam, Mobile Suit Victory Gundam, Mobile Fighter G Gundam, Mobile Suit Gundam Wing, After War Gundam X, Turn A Gundam, Mobile Suit Gundam SEED, Superior Defender Gundam Force, Mobile Suit Gundam SEED Destiny, Mobile Suit Gundam 00, Mobile Suit Gundam Unicorn, SD Gundam Sangokuden Brave Battle Warriors, Mobile Suit Gundam AGE, Gundam Reconguista in G, Gundam Build Fighters Try, Mobile Suit Gundam: Iron-Blooded Orphans, Gundam Build Divers,
(Plus numerous Cinema Movies and other media)

Astro Boy (1980 TV series)

Original Name: Tetsuwan atomu,

Origin: Japan

Date Started: Oct 1, 1980

Creator: Osamu Tezuka

Related Series: Astro Boy (2003 TV series) Astro Boy (1963 TV series) Astro Boy (film)

== Children's television ==
=== Barney ===
Original name: Barney & Friends
Origin: United States
Date started: 1988 (character and video series Barney and the Backyard Gang), 1992 (TV)
Creators: Sheryl Leach and Kathy Parker
First network to broadcast: Public Broadcasting Service
First country to adapt: Israel

Region/country	Local name	Network	Date premiered	Notes
United States	Barney & Friends	PBS	April 6, 1992	
Israel	החברים של ברני; Hachaverim Shel Barney	Channel 2, Hop!	November 2, 1997	
Brazil	O Clube do Barney	Rede Bandeirantes	July 5, 1999	The program was mixed the American episodes centered around the children, Barney, Baby Bop and BJ with the scenes recorded in Brazil, which consisted of the Brazilian Barney co-starring with a group of 8 children.
Brazil	O Parque Musical do Barney e Seus Amigos	Universo Online	January 24, 2006	The live stage show was adapted and based on Barney & Friends; toured around Latin American countries since August 2004. A big finale of the signature closing song from the clip of the show was shown with a lot of information online.
South Korea	바니와 친구들; Baniwa Chingudeul	Korean Broadcasting System	November 4, 2001	Title also used for later Korean dub of the US series.

=== Bozo the Clown ===
Original name: Bozo's Circus
Origin: United States
Date started: 1946 (character), 1949 (TV)
Date ended: early 1970s (most markets), 2001 (as WGN-TV's The Bozo Super Sunday Show)
Creator: Alan W. Livingston
First station to broadcast: KTTV/Los Angeles, California

=== Hi-5 ===
Original name: Hi-5
Origin: Australia
Date started: June–August 1998 (music group), 12 April 1999 (original TV series), 15 May 2017 (TV series revival)
Date ended: 16 December 2011 (original TV series), 16 June 2017 (TV series revival), November 2019 (music group)
Creators: Helena Harris and Posie Graeme-Evans
First network to broadcast: Nine Network
First country to adapt: United States

=== Romper Room ===
Original name: Romper Room
Origin: United States
Date started: 1953
Date ended: 1981 (US Franchised/local versions); 1994 (US syndicated version)
Creator: Nancy Claster
First station to broadcast: WBAL-TV/Baltimore, Maryland
First country to adapt: Canada (local version at CKLW-TV/Windsor, Ontario, 1954)

=== Sesame Street ===
Original name: Sesame Street
Origin: United States
Date started: 1969
Creators: Joan Ganz Cooney and Lloyd Morrisett
First network to broadcast: National Educational Television
First country to adapt: Brazil

Region/country	Local name	Network	Language	Date premiered	Notes
Algeria	Dar Semseme دار سمسم	Lina TV	Arabic	2020	
Australia	Open Sesame	Nick Jr. Channel	English		
Brazil	Vila Sésamo	TV Globo; TV Cultura; TV Rá-Tim-Bum	Portuguese	1972; 2007	
Egypt	Alam Simsim	ERTU	Arabic	2000	
France	Bonjour Sésame		French	1974	
France	5, Rue Sésame		French	1976	
Israel	רחוב סומסום	Israeli Educational Television; Hop! Channel	Hebrew	1983	
Japan	セサミストリート	NHK	Japanese	1971	
Jordan	Hikayat Simsim	JRTV	Arabic	2003	
Kuwait	افتح يا سمسم		Arabic	1979; 2013	
Mexico	Plaza Sésamo	Televisa	Spanish	1972	
Netherlands	Sesamstraat		Dutch; Flemish	1976	
Philippines	Batibot	RPN; PTV; ABS-CBN; GMA Network	Tagalog; English	1984	First fully bilingual version
Philippines	Batibot	TV5	Tagalog; English	2010	
South Africa	Takalani Sesame	SABC	Venda	2000, 2007	
Spain	Barrio Sésamo	TVE	Spanish	1979	
Sweden	Svenska Sesam	TV2	Swedish	1981	
Turkey	Susam Sokağı	TRT	Turkish	1980's	
United States	Sesame Street	NET; PBS; HBO	English	November 10, 1969	Original Version
United States	Sesame Amigos	Univision	Spanish	August 1, 2015	
West Germany; Germany	Sesamstraße	NDR; Das Erste; KiKa	German	1973	

=== Blue's Clues ===
Original name: Blue's Clues
Origin: United States
Date started: 1996
Creators: Traci Paige Johnson Todd Kessler and Angela C. Santomero
First network to broadcast: Nick Jr. Channel
First country to adapt: United Kingdom

Region/country	Local name	Network	Date premiered	Notes
United Kingdom	Blue's Clues	Nick Jr. United Kingdom	1997 (test pilot); January 5, 1998 (full series)	
Latin America	Las Pistas de Azul	None	1997 (test pilot only)	Title renamed for later Latin American Spanish dub of the US series.
Italy	unknown title name	Rai 1	1999 (test pilot only)	Title also used for later Italian dub of the US series.
South Korea	수수께끼 블루; Susukkekki Beullu	KBS2	July 24, 2000	Title renamed for later Korean dub of the US series.
Portugal	As Pistas da Blue	RTP2	January 2, 2006	

=== The Wiggles ===
Original name: The Wiggles
Origin: Australia
Date started: 1991 (Band), 1993 (Videos) 1998 (TV)
Creators: Greg Page, Murray Cook, Jeff Fatt and Anthony Field
First network to broadcast: Seven Network
First country to adapt: Taiwan

Region/country	Local name	Network	Date premiered	Notes
Australia	The Wiggles	Seven Network, Australian Broadcasting Corporation	July 31, 1998	
Taiwan	The Wiggles	Playhouse Disney	March 31, 2003	
Latin America	Los Wiggles	Playhouse Disney	September 2006	Replaced by Argentine-recorded dubs of Wiggle and Learn and more of The Wiggles' viral videos for the Original era from January 25, 2010, onward.

== Talk shows ==
=== AM ===
Original name: Ralph Story's AM
Origin: United States
Date started: 1971
Creator: Ralph Story
First network to broadcast: KABC-TV
Related series: AM America, AM Los Angeles/Live with Regis and Kathie Lee/Live! with Kelly, AM Chicago/The Oprah Winfrey Show, AM Buffalo, Morning Exchange
Second-generation related series: Dr. Oz, Dr. Phil, The Gayle King Show, The Nate Berkus Show, Good Morning America
Third-generation related series: The Doctors

Note: Canada AM is unrelated to this franchise and predates it.

=== The Jerry Springer Show ===
Original name: The Jerry Springer Show
Origin: United States
Date started: 1991
Creator: Jerry Springer
First station to broadcast: WLWT/Cincinnati, Ohio
First country to adapt: United Kingdom (as The Springer Show)
Related series (UK): The Jeremy Kyle Show
Related series (US): The Steve Wilkos Show, Judge Jerry
Second-generation related series (US): The Jeremy Kyle Show

Region/country	Local name	Network	Language	Date premiered	Notes
Philippines	Face to Face, Face the People	TV5	Filipino, English	March 22, 2010 - October 11, 2013; October 14, 2013 – November 21, 2014	First fully bilingual version
United Kingdom	The Jeremy Kyle Show	ITV1	English	July 4, 2005 – May 10, 2019	
United States	The Steve Wilkos Show		English	September 10, 2007 – present	

=== The Maury Povich Show ===
Original name: The Maury Povich Show
Origin: United States
Date started: 1990
Date ended: 1998
Creator: Maury Povich
First station to broadcast: US syndication
Related series: The Montel Williams Show, Maury
Second-generation related series: Trisha
Franchise ties: Sally Jessy Raphaël / Sally, The Jerry Springer Show, The Steve Wilkos Show

=== Ricki Lake ===
Original name: Ricki Lake
Origin: United States
Date started: 1993
Date ended: 2004
Creator: Garth Ancier, Gail Steinberg, Ricki Lake
First station to broadcast: US syndication
Related series: Jane (1992), Tempestt, Carnie!, Life & Style
Second-generation related series: The Ricki Lake Show

=== The Rosie O'Donnell Show ===
Original name: The Rosie O'Donnell Show
Origin: United States
Date started: 1996
Date ended: 2002
Creator: Rosie O'Donnell
First station to broadcast: US syndication
Related series: The Caroline Rhea Show, The Bonnie Hunt Show
Second-generation related series: The Ellen DeGeneres Show
Second-generation spin-off related series: Bethenny (also tied to the Real Housewives reality franchise)
Third-generation related series: The Rosie Show
Other franchise ties: The Oprah Winfrey Show, Real Housewives, Carnie!

== Newscasts ==
=== 60 Minutes ===
Original name: 60 Minutes
Origin: United States
Date started: 1968
Creator: Don Hewitt
First network to broadcast: CBS
First country to adapt: Australia 60 Minutes

Adaptations include 60 Minutes (New Zealand) and versions in Germany, Mexico, Peru and Portugal. The series has also been franchised in re-versioned cable episodes in the U.S. and even on CBS itself (see 60 Minutes II).

=== Action News ===
Original name: Rock 'n' Roll Radio News / Action News
Origin: United States
Date started: under current name: 1972; original format: 1958
Creators: Irv Weinstein (original format), Mel Kampmann (franchise)
First station to broadcast: WFIL-TV
First country to adapt: Australia

=== Eyewitness News ===
Original name: Eyewitness News
Origin: United States
Date started: 1970
Creator: Al Primo
First station to broadcast: WABC-TV
First country to adapt: Australia

=== Meet the Press ===
Original name: American Mercury Presents Meet the Press
Origin: United States
Date started: 1945
Creators: Martha Rountree and Lawrence E. Spivak
First network to broadcast: Mutual
First country to adapt: Australia (Meet the Press)

=== News Central ===
Original name: News Central Origin: United States
Date started: 2003
Date ended: 2006
Creator: Sinclair Broadcast Group
First station to broadcast (flagship station): WBFF
Related series: The Point, Washington Newsroom, Full Measure with Sharyl Attkisson

=== NewsCenter / NotiCentro ===
Original name: NotiCentro (Latin America), The Sixth/Eleventh Hour (United States)
Origin: Puerto Rico
Date started: 1967 (original usage), 1974 (NBC franchise)
First station to broadcast: WAPA-TV
First country to adapt: United States
Related series: NewsChannel, News 4 New York, Channel # News (with local variants)

The name was also used in Canada, Brazil, Australia, Italy and Japan.

=== SportsCenter ===
Original name: SportsCenter
Origin: United States
Date started: 1979
Creator: John A. Walsh
First station to broadcast: ESPN

Adaptations include SportsCenter Asia and Canada's SportsCentre.

== Variety shows ==
=== All That ===
Original name: All That
Origin: United States
Date started: 1994
Creator: Dan Schneider, Mike Tollin, and Brian Robbins
First network to broadcast: Nickelodeon
Spin-off series: Action League Now!, The Amanda Show, Keenan and Kel, The Nick Cannon Show
Related series: Sonny With a Chance, So Random

=== Eat Bulaga! ===
Original name: Eat Bulaga!
Origin: Philippines
Date started: July 30, 1979
Creator: TVJ Productions (previously produced by TAPE Inc.)
First network to broadcast: RPN (now airs on TV5 and RPTV)
First country to adapt: Indonesia as The New Eat Bulaga! Indonesia (2014–2023) (formerly known as Eat Bulaga! Indonesia; 2012–2014)
Related series: The Ryzza Mae Show (2013–2015)

=== Hee Haw ===
Original name: Hee Haw
Origin: United States
Date started: June 15, 1969
Creators: Frank Peppiatt and John Aylesworth
First network to broadcast: CBS
Related series: Hee Haw Honeys, Hee Haw Silver
Other franchise ties: The Jimmy Dean Show, The Sonny & Cher Show

=== It's Showtime ===
Original name: It's Showtime
Origin: Philippines
Date started: October 24, 2009
Creator: ABS-CBN
First network to broadcast: ABS-CBN (now airs on Kapamilya Channel, A2Z, ALLTV, GMA Network and GTV)

First country to adapt: Indonesia as It's Showtime Indonesia (2019–2020) on MNCTV

=== Rowan & Martin's Laugh-In ===
Original name: Rowan & Martin's Laugh-In
Origin: United States
Date started: January 22, 1968
Date ended: March 12, 1973
Creator: Dan Rowan, Dick Martin, and George Schlatter
First network to broadcast: NBC
First country to adapt: Philippines as Super Laff-In (1969)
Related series: Turn-On
Spin-off series: Letters to Laugh-In, Baggy Pants and the Nitwits

=== 2 Days & 1 Night! ===
Original name: 1박 2일 (1 Night 2 Days) 2 Days & 1 Night! Origin: South Korea
Date started: August 5, 2007
Creator: Korean Broadcasting System
First network to broadcast: KBS2
First country to adapt: China as 2天1夜

=== You Can't Do That On Television ===
Original name: You Can't Do That On Television
Origin: Canada
Date started: 1979
Date ended: 1990
Creators: Roger Price and Geoffrey Darby
First network to broadcast: CTV
First country to adapt: United States, as Don't Look Now (1983)
Spin-off series: Turkey Television, UFO Kidnapped, Whatever Turns You On
Related series: All That, The Amanda Show

== See also ==
- Media franchise
- List of multimedia franchises
- Reality television
- The X-Files franchise
- Buffyverse
- List of American television series based on British television series
- List of British television series based on American television series
- List of multimedia franchises originating in television
- List of television franchises by episode count
