= Masameer: The Movie =

- Theatrical release poster
- Directed by: Malik Nejer
- Screenplay by: Malik Nejer
- Story by: Abdulaziz Almuzaini; Malik Nejer
- Based on: Masameer by Malik Nejer
- Produced by: Abdulaziz Almuzaini
- Starring: Malik Nejer; Shahad Alahmari; Ibraheem Alkhairallah; Abdulaziz Alshehri; Mazroa Almazroa
- Edited by: Malik Nejer
- Music by: Saleh Hadad
- Production company: Myrkott Animation Studio
- Distributed by: Vox Cinemas
- Release dates: 9 January 2020 (Arab territories); 19 March 2020 (Netflix)
- Running time: 100 minutes
- Country: Saudi Arabia
- Language: Arabic

Masameer: The Movie (Arabic: مسامير: الفيلم) is a 2020 Saudi Arabian adult animated superhero comedy film directed by Malik Nejer (in his directorial debut) and written by Nejer & Abdulaziz Almuzaini. It is based on the web series Masameer created by Malik Nejer. It is the first animated film made entirely in Saudi Arabia.

== Plot ==
After their house is demolished to make way for a public restroom, Saltooh, Saad, and Trad become homeless and struggle to find purpose in their lives. While scavenging through trash, they discover an invitation to join the Society of Heroes with Extraordinary Abilities and decide to form their own superhero team, the “Three Gorooms.”

Meanwhile, Dana, an enthusiast of artificial intelligence, creates a helpful robot named Fazzee, though its first test ends in disaster. At the Society’s recruitment event at the Riyadh International Convention and Exhibition Center, the trio and Dana are rejected by the famous superhero Captain D and his organization.

At the event, the villain AlMuthi steals a dangerous biological weapon from Captain D. Inspired by the rejection, Dana and the trio establish their own group, the “Extraordinary Gorooms,” and set up a headquarters using a rundown sponsored car.

The next day, AlMuthi attempts to unleash the weapon at the Kingdom Centre. Captain D, the trio, and Dana intervene, leading to a destructive battle through the city. Fazzee malfunctions and nearly causes mass destruction before Dana and Captain Wisdom stop the robot. Captain D eventually recovers the biological weapon, though it activates shortly afterward.

Following the incident, Captain D and government officials are publicly credited with saving the city, while the trio recover in a hospital feeling overlooked. Dana encourages them with a story about kindness and reward, after which the mayor of Riyadh promises to recognize their heroism. With the trio discovering that the restroom built where their home once stood now bears a sign honoring them.

== Voice cast ==
- Malik Nejer as Saltooh / Saad / Trad / Dr. Adel / Dr. Nafea / Hizam
- Shahad Alahmari as Dana
- Ibraheem Alkhairallah
- Abdulaziz Alshehri as Bandar / Mane
- Mazroa Almazroa as Saleh / Captain Manteqi / Rbeaan
- Mohammed Sindi
- Yousef Aldakheel as Satam
- Sulaiman Alnazha
- Lama Alfard as Dana's Mom / Reporter
- Abdulaziz Almuzaini as Dana's Dad / Fazeea
- Shaalan Alshaalan as Sulaiteen
- Raghad Bidas
- Hamad Almutaani as Emam
- Riyad Alsalhani as Non

== Release ==
It was released on January 9, 2020, in Arab theaters. Its international premiere was on March 19, 2020, on Netflix.

As of March 2023, the film was removed from Netflix. But was eventually bought back in 2024 and was eventually removed again on June 1, 2026.

== Future ==
On September 16, 2020, Myrkott Animation Studio signed a 5-year exclusivity deal with Netflix to produce shows and movies focused on Saudi society with a focus on producing more of Masameer. Masameer County Season 2 premiered on March 2, 2023, on its platform.
