= Trust (game show) =

- What is the price of your betrayal?
- Created by: Banijay Entertainment
- Composer: David Drussant & Simon Vantheemsche
- Country of origin: France

Production
- Running time: 30–60 minutes

Original release
- Release: 2012

Trust is a television game show which offers large cash prizes for correctly answering a series of randomized questions of varying difficulty. The format based on preconceptions, cooperation, knowledge, strategy and mutual confidence. The format created by Banijay Entertainment/Air Productions and aired in many countries around the world. The first adaptation is the French version in September 2012.

== Rules of the game ==
Two candidates not knowing must meet together on issues of general culture to win up the jackpot. However, only one of these candidates will walk away with the money accumulated by deciding to "volte-face" then it should only respond to one question to pocket the winnings.

For each question, candidates choose (without being able to see) the level of difficulty of the question proposed to them. They have an early question, the wording of which is common to the three difficulty levels offered, and discover the end of the question after choosing the difficulty level they want. If both candidates have chosen different levels of difficulty, this is the question at the higher of the two is asked.

Three difficulty levels are named Basic, Medium and Master. The master level is the most difficulty level, the higher the value of the question is important: a question Medium is 50% of the Master a question, a question Basic, 20%. The scale of earnings are as follows (based in the French version):

Level	Question Basic	Question Medium	Question Master	Total earnings potential
1	200 €	500 €	1,000 €	1,000 €
2	400 €	1,000 €	2,000 €	3,000 €
3	600 €	1,500 €	3,000 €	6,000 €
4	800 €	2,000 €	4,000 €	10,000 €
5	1,000 €	2,500 €	5,000 €	15,000 €
6	1,200 €	3,000 €	6,000 €	21,000 €
7	1,600 €	4,000 €	8,000 €	29,000 €
8	2,200 €	5,500 €	11,000 €	40,000 €
9	3,000 €	7,500 €	15,000 €	55,000 €
10	4,000 €	10,000 €	20,000 €	75,000 €
11	5,000 €	12,500 €	25,000 €	100,000 €

Once fully raised the issue, both candidates may consult and exchange views. They have a limited time, indicated by a count of 10 seconds timeout. Exhibitors must formulate a common response in the form of a sentence beginning: "Our answer is ...".

- In case of right answer, the money is added to a pot and candidates spend the next question.
- In case of wrong answer, the candidates do not win money and receive a warning in the form of a red cross. However, they go to the next question.

After three errors, the duo is removed and leaves no earnings.

== Face to face ==
At any point in the game, an alarm may sound just after the beginning of the statement a question. Both candidates chairs, which together formed a bench, separate and automatically join the four members of their "clan" (family, friends, colleagues ...) for advice. Example, they may try to guess the question to be asked, or construct a strategy to turn around and win the pot.

Once the time of consultation is complete, the chairs of the two candidates turn and face. Then they move towards each other, very gradually. It was during this journey that either candidate has the opportunity to do an about-face. More candidates are approaching one another, the more money available to volte-face and the greater the level of difficulty of the question is raised, reaching all the gains accumulated so far Master for a question.

If neither candidate does volte-face, the game returns to normal. However, if a candidate decides to play alone, he should press the buzzer in front of him. It must then respond and only 10 seconds for the sum announced at the time of reversal, the question which the statement was started before the alarm sounds. The end of the question (Basic, Medium or Master) is a function of when the candidate buzzed more he waited longer, the question is difficult.

- In case of right answer, he won the sum and the other candidate restarts empty handed.
- In case of wrong answer, it is eliminated and the other candidate can try his luck.
- If two candidates are wrong, they are both removed and leave no earnings.

If, after 11 questions, no volte-face took place, a 12th question is asked. This is immediately followed by an alarm, mean turnaround required for either of the candidates.

== International versions ==
Country	Title	Host	Network	Date aired	Prize
Egypt	لحظة شك; Lahzet Shak	Mohamed Henedi	Rotana Masriya	29 December 2012	£E500,000
France	Volte Face (original format)	Nagui	France 2	17 September – 2 November 2012	€100,000
Lebanon	قصة ثقة; Koset thiqah	Michel Kazi	Future Television	1 January 2013	£L50,000,000
Saudi Arabia	أزمة ثقة; Azmet thiqah	Mohammad Khlawi	Rotana Khalejeya	16 December 2012	SR500.000
Turkey	Güven Bana	Tamer Karadağlı (2012); Müge Anlı (2019; 2025)	aTV	December 2012; 28 June 2019; 10 June 2025	500.000₺ 1.000.000₺ 6.000.000₺
