= Masameer County =

Saudi adult animated television series

- Genre: Adult animation Black comedy
- Created by: Abdulaziz Almuzaini; Malik Nejer
- Based on: Masameer; By Malik Nejer
- Written by: Abdulaziz Almuzaini; Malik Nejer
- Directed by: Malik Nejer
- Voices of: Malik Nejer; Mazroa Almazroa; Abdulaziz Alshehri; Lama Alfard; Yousef Aldakheel; Ibraheem Alkhairallah; Shahad Alahmari; Yusuf Aldakhil; Mohammed Sendi; Fahad Albutairi; Shaalan Alshaalan; Shafi Alharthi; Khalid Alsayed; Ibraheem Hajjaj; Nawaf Alshubaili; Sohayb Godus
- Country of origin: Saudi Arabia
- Original language: Arabic
- No. of seasons: 2
- No. of episodes: 14

Production
- Executive producer: Abdulaziz Almuzaini
- Producers: Abdulaziz Almuzaini (S1); Abdullah Saeed (S2)
- Running time: 11–38 minutes
- Production company: Myrkott Animation Studio

Original release
- Network: Netflix
- Release: 1 July 2021 – 2 March 2023

Masameer County (Arabic: مقاطعة مسامير) is a Saudi Arabian adult animated television series created and written by Abdulaziz Almuzaini and Malik Nejer. Based on the animated web series Masameer by Malik Nejer.

== Synopsis ==
Masameer County follow misstep of Saudi view, this series follow misadventures of mischievous resident.

== Characters ==
=== Returning ===
- Saltooh
- Saad
- Trad
- Dr. Adel
- Sisteen
- Dr. Nafea
- Bandar
- Mane
- Mazen
- Hizam
- Khalaf
- Muneer
- Dr. Barbian
- Abdullah
- Abu Fahd

=== Introduction ===
- Mother Lapis: (Voiced by Shahad Alahmari) is a woman that takes care of orphans who Saltooh accidentally causes her death from a peanut allergy after giving her donuts with peanuts.
- Dalal: (Voiced by Shahad Alahmari) is a woman who falls in love with Saad in the episode "Shilajit", she ends up leaving Saad at the end of the episode. She later appears in the episode "Clearance" where she is now married to an abusive husband.
- Dr. Fatima: (Voiced by Lama Alfard) is the highest-ranking doctor in Dr. Adel's workplace and is shown to have a higher rank than Dr. Nafea who is Dr. Adel's superior.
- Badr Ayed
- Olivea: (Voiced by Lama Alfard) is known as the most beautiful dog in France, she loves big noses. She first appears in "Minor Occultation" when Trad gets a call from her and appears later when Saad tells Trad that Olivea in on the phone only to find that she is talking to Saad. She died when Saltooh accidentally runs over her at an event due to the car having no brakes
- Fahd
- Captain Majeed

== Production ==
Season 1 started production following a 5-year exclusive distribution period.

Season 2 was announced in 2022, and was later released in 2023.

== Release ==
Masameer County was premiered on Netflix on 1 July 2021.

== Episodes ==
=== Season 1 (2021) ===
No. overall	No. in season	Title	Original release date
1	1	"Ice Cream"	1 July 2021
At his mansion, one of Bandar's servants tells him a bedtime story. He gets angry over how the story ends and changes it to that way he likes it. At midnight, Bandar struggles to sleep and starts craving a midnight snack leading to him leaving his mansion and starting an unexpected adventure resulting in him entering an appliance shop for ice cream, finding someone who has ice cream and even joining a terrorist group.
2	2	"Washingtonia"	1 July 2021
Muneer and Khalaf fight for polar opposite causes with Muneer fighting for K-pop and Khalaf fighting for soccer. When public interest joins with what they're advocating for, they suffer from an existential crisis. Meanwhile, Fatima tells Adel that he must solve issues with the government.
3	3	"Lapis"	1 July 2021
Saltooh gets hired as a deliveryman for a bakery, after getting fired for sending peanut donuts to mother Lapis, he ends on the wrong side of the law eventually getting another job as a security guard.
4	4	"Pimple"	1 July 2021
When Saltooh who just started streaming on Twitch gets a pimple on his butt, the internet notices him eventually resulting in he and his formerly unknown channel becoming famous on Twitch.
5	5	"The Plumber"	1 July 2021
When Muneer loses his job as the producer of Blood For Dignity to his arch nemesis, the plumber, their confrontation turns into a global media war with Saltooh, Saad and Trad joining Muneer's side.
6	6	"Latrine of Secrets"	1 July 2021
At the reconciliation party for the Khodr and Sfor families, the tribe leaders talk about their 500-year old tribal feud over a camel. At dinnertime, Juffair and Mane go to a restroom not knowing that the restroom is connected to a speaker, they both have a conservation resulting in the tribal feud accidentally being reignited and the death of all tribe members expect for Juffair and Mane.
7	7	"Minor Occultation"	1 July 2021
Saltooh, Saad and Trad decide to stay at home for a few days after an accident to avoid the hectic life of living in Saudi society.
8	8	"Shilajit"	1 July 2021
Saltooh and Trad who have become underweight from starvation and malnutrition are enraged about Saad's vegetarian diet and obsession of eating healthy following 6 months of him being a movie director while Al Jeek is in danger from Saad becoming a vegetarian. At a health food shop, Saad meets Dalal, another vegetarian, who he falls in love with when they first meet. Later, they both go on a date with Dalal cancelling the date early and saying that she will marry him tomorrow. After paying off a massive amount of debt from getting ownership of all Al Jeek restaurants by accepting an offer from an investor and using his dowry money, Dalal breaking up with him and his friend dying from a heart attack, Saad alongside Saltooh and Trad become morbidly obese after 6 months of eating fried chicken, drinking soda and staying at home.

=== Season 2 (2023) ===
No. overall	No. in season	Title	Original release date
9	1	"Service Dog"	2 March 2023
After not being accepted into a cosplay competition because of him not being a service dog, Trad goes the extra mile to become a service dog. Meanwhile, Dr. Adel is overwhelmed by troubles at work.
10	2	"Elevator Pitch"	2 March 2023
When various guest getting panicked after gets stuck in an elevator with claustrophobia, they must decide what to do before it's too late.
11	3	"Clearance"	2 March 2023
After a banned book goes missing, a librarian named Mazen has retrieve the book or before too late. After his library gets burnt down resulting in him getting revenge.
12	4	"Outer Space Toilet"	2 March 2023
Bandar makes a mistake that lands him in a surprising place while an astronaut who is about to go on the moon takes a trip down memory lane.
13	5	"Wholesome Content"	2 March 2023
To fix their reputation following the release of an infamous TikTok video posted by them, Saltooh and Trad must perform in an educational play.
14	6	"The Limits of Honor"	2 March 2023
When a former resident of the country and the daughter of a late billionaire returns there, Juffair and Mane must fight for various challenges.

== Reception ==
Sulafa Alkhunaizi on Arab News who praised season 2 wrote "The new season was incredibly funny, incredibly accurate, and went by quickly. As the saying goes, “Time flies when you’re having fun.”

Rishabh Chauhan on The Envoy Web wrote "Masameer County season 2 is a commendable effort at addressing the socially and culturally resonant issues while rarely letting go of the leash on its idiosyncratic humor, all of which combine to make for a truly entertaining watch."
