= The Sesame Street Dictionary =

Sesame Street Dictionary
- First edition, 1980
- Author: Linda Hayward
- Illustrator: Joe Mathieu
- Language: English
- Genre: Reference
- Publisher: Random House/Children's Television Workshop
- Publication date: 1980
- Publication place: United States
- Media type: Hardcover
- Pages: 253
- ISBN: 0-394-84007-0

The Sesame Street Dictionary is an illustrated children's dictionary featuring Muppet characters from the popular television show Sesame Street. First published in 1980, it contains short definitions and sample sentences for around 1,300 words, each accompanied by an illustration featuring a character from Sesame Street. In 1986, the dictionary was also issued as an 8-volume set under the title Big Bird's Sesame Street Dictionary. Kermit the Frog's nephew, Robin the Frog makes a cameo in this book on the "frog" entry.

== Overview ==
The Sesame Street Dictionary contains definitions for around 1,300 words, with each definition being accompanied by a sample sentence and relevant illustration depicting a character from Sesame Street. The text was written by Linda Hayward and the illustrations were drawn by Joe Mathieu. The illustrations and example sentences are often intended to be humorous, featuring jokes and amusing situations. For example, the definition for "above" is accompanied by an image of Grover flying an airplane above some trees, which leads into an illustration for the next word, "accident", which depicts Grover parachuting to the ground, his plane having crashed into the tree. Homonyms are highlighted by The Amazing Mumford, the Muppet magician, who draws them out of a hat. In the original version of the book, no pronunciations are included with the definitions.

The book is designed for children between the ages of 3 and 8, both those who are able to read and those without reading ability. The words were selected by professional educators for their likelihood of being encountered by a child either through books or everyday experiences. Depending on the age and educational level of the reader, the book can expand a child's vocabulary, help with "reading readiness" and function as a first dictionary.

== Publishing history ==
The dictionary was first published in 1980 by Random House, in conjunction with Sesame Street producers Children's Television Workshop, in both a hardback edition and a special library binding. In 1981, it was republished by the Encyclopædia Britannica Educational Corporation under the title Big Bird's Sesame Street Dictionary. This edition featured an additional 100 pages of illustrations, and was packaged as an 8-volume set, with 45 pages per volume. The original one-volume dictionary was reissued in 2004, again by Random House, as part of the Sesame Street franchise's 35th anniversary. This version was accompanied by an audio CD containing songs from the television program, including "The Cookie Rhyming Song", "Elmo's Rap Alphabet" and "Off To School".

== Reception ==
When it was first published, the dictionary received praise from reviewers, and became a standard work in school libraries. Writing in the School Library Journal, Daisy Kouzel described it as "exploding with good fun", adding that "youngsters will find unending entertainment in its big, colorful pages and will enrich their vocabulary in the process." Barbara Safford's Guide to Reference Materials for School Library Media Centers listed it as "highly recommended". Kenneth Kister, in his reference source guide Kister's Best Dictionaries for Adults and Young People, was also positive about the work, although he was critical of the fact that the 8-volume edition published in 1986 retailed at a significantly higher price without adding much worthwhile new material.
