= Myrkott Animation Studio =

Saudi Arabian animation studio

- Type: Private
- Industry: Animation
- Predecessor: AD Production; Lumink
- Founded: 2014; 12 years ago
- Founder: Abdulaziz Almuzaini; Malik Nejer; Faisal Alamer; Adnan Obathani
- Headquarters: Riyadh, Saudi Arabia
- Key people: Abdulaziz Almuzaini (CEO)
- Website: myrkott.com

Myrkott Animation Studio is a Saudi Arabian animation studio based on Riyadh, Saudi Arabia. founded in 2014 by Abdulaziz Almuzaini, Malik Nejer, Faisal Alamer, and Adnan Obathani.

In 2020, the studio signed a deal with Netflix for exclusive distribution for a five year period.

== Filmography ==
=== Television series ===
- Masameer County (2021–2023)

=== Web series ===
- Masameer (2011–2019)
- Sanbar (2013–2016)
- Society Awareness (2013)
- American 101 (2013–2017)
- Shops (2014–2015)
- About Sweden (2015–2018)
- Arwa and Laffa (2016–2017)
- Under the Mushroom (2017)
- Yarob (2018–2019)
- The Ultimate Solutions Center (TBA)

=== Pilots ===
- Dying Twice (2016)

=== Films ===
- Masameer: The Movie (2020)
- Masameer Junior (2025)

=== Short films ===
- The Wedding Dress (2016)

=== Other works ===
- Head to Head (animation sequences)
