= Masameer Junior =

- Release poster
- Directed by: Malik Nejer
- Screenplay by: Abdulaziz Almuzaini
- Based on: Masameer by Malik Nejer
- Produced by: Abdullah Saeed
- Starring: Malik Nejer; Ali Kraiem; Mazroa Almazroa; Mira Sabbagh
- Edited by: Malik Nejer; Abdullah Saeed; Ata-ur-Rehman Shaikh
- Music by: Tiko Lasola
- Production companies: Myrkott Animation Studio; Sirb Productions
- Distributed by: Netflix
- Release date: 12 June 2025
- Running time: 72 minutes
- Country: Saudi Arabia
- Language: Arabic

Masameer Junior (Arabic: مسامير جونيور) is a 2025 Saudi Arabian adult animated comedy film directed by Malik Nejer and written by Abdulaziz Almuzaini. It is prequel feature, based on the web series Masameer created by Malik Nejer.

The film was released on Netflix on 12 June 2025.

== Plot ==
Three six-year-olds named Saltooh, Saad and Trad are now in elementary school after being kicked out of preschool. In class, their teacher said that bad behavior leads straight to hell. At break, the children discuss that they committed the three bad acts of stealing, lying and wearing jeans and decide to do multiple good deeds so they won't go to hell but they all backfire.

At home, Saltooh discovers that his uncle was watching a famous singer named Maisa Whabi with his wife not being happy about what Saltooh's uncle was watching, Saad and Trad with Saltooh they find out that other men have been secretly watching Maisa's songs at a rural Café while their wives were not watching and Trad tells them to stop watching Maisa but they didn't listen resulting in trad making assassinating Maisa the ultimate good deed and Hizam telling them that Maisa comes from Artaqia.

When they arrive at Artaqia, they discover that it is actually a failed state where the citizens are depressed, crime is common and an ongoing civil war between September's Flower and July's Thorn which started after the assassination of Riyadh Chamoun. At a post office, Trad wants to send a letter to Maisa but couldn't so he decided to directly call Maisa while Saltooh and Saad ask a man for directions to where Maisa is leading them to a nightclub.

At Maisa's mansion, Trad pushes the plumber's tuk-tuk into the sea and discover that the mansion is full of bodyguards. But Trad decides to continue with his plan rather than do his task. Meanwhile, Saltooh and Saad disguise themselves as an adult to get into the nightclub. The nightclub employee tells them that they have to talk to the manager. However, the children blow their covers causing the three children to be arrested.

When they were in prison, Saltooh and Saad beg for food while Trad says that he could have done his job together and wonders if anyone could stop Maisa's bodyguards. Just then, Major General Meshaal Mashoor arrives eliminating the guards one by one, amusing Trad and freeing the prisoners and bringing them to the September's Flower's headquarters where the children eat food at the table and Mashoor is angry at the general.

When Ghandoor, the caliph of the September's flowers arrives, the soldiers worship him, however Trad tells him that Maisa has broken up with him causing him to run away. At the mansion, Maisa gets a letter from the children telling that they have a disease and went to Artaqia to meet Maisa even though they actually plan on assassinating her. Ghandoor reveals that he used to be in love for Maisa before she beaten up a man that tried to give her flowers accidentally ending her career and causing him to start September's Flower starting the civil war that caused Artaqia to become a failed state.

Upon being kicked out by Ghandoor, a mail dog sends a letter back only to get ran over by a car. When they read the letter, they discover that Maisa is at an event. At an event involving Mashoor, Ghandoor places a C-4. When Ghandoor and Maisa reunites, she reveals that Ghandoor helped Maisa and July's Thorn with assassinating Riyad Chamoun by beating up a man. When Maisa arrives on stage, the general shoots Mashoor and a war veteran arrives with an announcement, but the children accidentally assassinate the war veteran instead of Maisa sparking a fight between the audience.

Maisa escapes the event only for the plumber to accidentally run over her with his tuk-tuk resulting in Maisa's death and the theater exploding with the nearby citizens waking up and praising Ghandoor and the children for saving Artaqia. Back at home, the teacher gets angry at the children for assassinating Maisa only for him to reveal that there is a terrorist still alive causing the kids to do another plan. Meanwhile, at an auction in New York City, Adel accidentally bids for Nafea's pants which the children stole causing Nafea to scream.

== Cast ==
- Malik Nejer as Trad / Saad / Saltooh / Dr. Adel / Dr. Nafea / Hizam / Abdullah
- Ali Kraiem as Maisa Whabi
- Mazroa Almazroa as Muneer / Ghandoor / Charbel / Abu Fahd
- Mira Sabbagh as Patrica
- Maher Jaber as Abu Ali
- Sulaiman Alnazha
- Oumkalthoun Sarah Bard
- Ammar Sabban
- Saeed Almoudi
- Elias Alchikhandi
- Hager Elkhashab
- Amira Hdaifi
- Sofee
- Adel Bu Hanssoun
- Samer Al Jondi
- Nedal Jober
- Ola Abu Khoder
- Mo Q

== Release ==
Masameer Junior was released on Netflix on 12 June 2025.

== Reception ==
Jose Solis of Common Sense Media gave the film four out of five stars, writing "Hilarious animated satire with violence, language, smoking".

Martha O'Hara praised the overall production and its cultural significance.

John Witw of BubbleBlabber gave the film 7/10 wrote "constantly misunderstanding the world around them, is something everyone around the world can have a good laugh"
