= Malik Nejer =

Saudi animator (born 1985)

- Born: 4 February 1985 (age 41); Dawadmi, Riyadh Province, Saudi Arabia
- Occupations: Director; Animator; Voice actor; Writer
- Years active: 2007–present
- Notable work: Masameer

Malik Nejer (born 4 February 1985) is a Saudi animator, writer, voice actor, and director. He is best known as the creator of the Saudi animated web series Masameer. He is also a co-founder of Myrkott Animation Studio and Sirb Productions.

== Early life ==
Nejer was born on 4 February 1985 in Dawadmi, Saudi Arabia. As a child, he developed an interest in international cartoons. He later moved to Riyadh to study law at King Saud University, but dropped out and began working for an advertising agency.

== Career ==
In 2007, Nejer began posting animated videos on YouTube. His video The Real Reason Behind the Jeddah Disaster went viral and by 2011 his channel had become the No. 4 subscribed on YouTube in Saudi Arabia. Following that success, MBC invited him to produce animated shorts for television commercial breaks.

Nejer later co-founded Myrkott Animation Studio, which became known for producing the animated web series Masameer. The series gained a substantial online following for its satirical portrayal of Saudi society and everyday life.

In 2020, Nejer co-wrote and directed Masameer: The Movie, a feature-length adaptation of the web series released in theaters. The following year, Netflix released Masameer County, an animated television series based on the franchise.

Writing for the Middle East Institute, historian Sean Foley described Masameer County as reflective of broader social and cultural changes taking place in Saudi Arabia, noting that the series used satire to examine issues affecting Saudi society.

In 2023, Nejer directed Head to Head, his first live-action feature film. The film was released by Netflix and was described by Esquire Middle East as helping establish a new quality benchmark for Saudi filmmaking.

Nejer and the Masameer franchise have been cited as part of a broader transformation in Saudi entertainment and media production during the 2010s and 2020s.

== Filmography ==
=== Film ===
Year	Title	Director	Writer	Actor	Role	Notes
2020	Masameer: The Movie	Yes	Yes	Yes	Trad, Saad, Saltooh, Dr. Adel, Dr. Nafea, Hizam, The Pixel	
2023	Head to Head	Yes	No	No	—N/a	Live action film
2025	Masameer Junior	Yes	Co-writers	Yes	Trad, Saad, Saltooh, Dr. Adel, Dr. Nafea, Hizam, Abdullah	

=== Television ===
Year	Title	Creator	Director	Writer	Actor	Role	Notes
2021–2023	Masameer County	Yes	Yes	Yes	Yes	Trad, Saad, Saltooh, Dr. Adel, Dr. Nafea, Hizam, Aqeel, Abdullah	
2026	Alkhallat+: The Series	No	No	No	Yes	Abu Mutlaq	Episode: "Death Road"

=== Web ===
Year	Title	Creator	Director	Writer	Actor	Role	Notes
2011–2019	Masameer	Yes	Yes	No	Yes	Aqeel, Trad, Saad, Saltooh, Dr. Adel, Dr. Nafea, Hizam, The Pixel, Blue Cat, Abdullah	
2013–2016	Sanbar	Yes	Yes	No	Yes	Narrator	
2013	Society Awearness	Yes	Yes	Yes	Yes	The Pixel	
2016–2017	Awra and Laffa	Yes	Yes	Yes	Yes	Awra, Laffa, Abdullah	
2018–2019	Yarob	Yes	Yes	Yes	No	—N/a	
2025	Shaklait	Yes	Yes	Yes	Yes	Yellow Guy, Brain	
TBA	The Ultimate Solutions Center	Yes	Yes	Yes	No	—N/a	
