= Sesame Street (comic strip) =

American comic strip by Cliff Roberts

Sesame Street is a nationally syndicated comic strip inspired by Sesame Street. Written and drawn by veteran Sesame animator Cliff Roberts, the earliest concept art was created in 1970, and, by 1971, a promotional booklet was created as the comic entered the market, courtesy of King Features. The strip debuted on November 15, 1971, in more than 175 newspapers, and ran until 1975. The strip, which ran both daily and on Sundays, was conceptually similar to the series in its pedagogical goals, but, in the first year of the strip, conspicuous by the absence of the Muppets.

Instead, the strip featured several new characters created by Roberts, such as Jasper and Julius, Christopher Clumsy, and Miss Fortune; in 1972, all of these characters appeared in animated inserts on Sesame Street itself. Also regularly seen was Professor Drummond Bugle, a lecturer, similar to more generic characters used in Roberts' animated segments. Roberts fleshed out the strip's cast with a menagerie of newly minted animal characters. Amongst them were Lotta Elephant, Richard Bird, Hedda the frog, Balderdash the mouse, Titus the snake, Thomas Turtle, Crawley the worm, and an errant spider. A pair of nameless, Muppet-esque monsters also skulked through on occasion.

Though the earlier version of the strip avoided the Muppets, Big Bird, Oscar the Grouch and Cookie Monster joined the cast in December 1972, and they appeared through the end of the strip's run in 1975.

Like Sesame Street, the comic strip was largely educational, using broad humor to relate learning concepts. The most frequent topics were parts of the body, shapes, and identification of objects. Other subjects included opposites or pairings (up and down, here and there, etc.) and emotions. Letters and numbers surfaced rarely. Many strips were pure comedy, revolving around the characters' eccentricities and foibles.
