= Masameer =

Saudi Arabian animated web series

- Genre: Adult animation Comedy
- Created by: Malik Nejer
- Showrunners: Malik Nejer; Abdulaziz Almuzaini; Faisal Alamer
- Written by: Faisal Alamer
- Directed by: Malik Nejer
- Voices of: Malik Nejer; Mazroa Almazroa; Ibraheem Alkhairallah; Yousef Aldakheel; Abdulaziz Alshehri
- Ending theme: "Credits Music" by Alaa Wardi
- Country of origin: Saudi Arabia
- Original language: Arabic
- No. of seasons: 8
- No. of episodes: 107 (list of episodes)

Production
- Executive producer: Abdulaziz Almuzaini
- Producer: Abdulaziz Almuzaini
- Editor: Abdullah Saeed
- Running time: 3–42 minutes
- Production companies: AD Production (2011-2012); Lumink (2012-2014); Myrkott Animation Studio (2014-2019)

Original release
- Network: YouTube
- Release: 19 February 2011 – 22 March 2019

Masameer (Arabic: مسامير) is a Saudi Arabian adult animated web series developed by the studio Myrkott, a studio co-established in 2014 by Faisal Alamer, Abdulaziz Almuzaini, and Malik Nejer, with its head office in Riyadh. The name of the show is from the fictional location of Masameer County, which is located west of the capital city of Riyadh. The series satirizes societal issues in Saudi Arabia. In 2017, Zahraa Alkhaisi of CNN wrote that the series was "satirical" and that the topics "would have been taboo until very recently".

In 2020 the studio signed a deal with Netflix for exclusive distribution for a five-year period. Masameer: The Movie was released for Netflix and earned about 7.5 million riyal, equal to 2,000,000 2020 US dollars. The first season of Masameer County premiered on July 1, 2021 while the second season premiered on March 2, 2023. Masameer Junior was released on June 12, 2025.

In 2021, the 'Masameer Experience' a Simworx dynamic media attraction based on the series, was opened at the BLVD Ruh City development in Saudi Arabia.

On June 26, 2024, Masameer creator Abdulaziz Almuzaini announced that a Saudi court was prosecuting him with charges that he and his company had "sponsored and supported terrorism and homosexuality" in Masameer. The case had been set in motion in 2021, coinciding with the series' release on Netflix. Muzaini was sentenced to 13 years in prison and a 13-year travel ban, increased to a 30-year travel ban following Muzaini's attempt to appeal the verdict. As of August 2024, the case was pending an appeal to the Saudi Arabia Supreme Court.

== Characters ==
=== Main Characters ===
- Saltooh (Voiced by Malik Nejer): A distinctive man who has a long nose. He drives a pickup truck that he, Saad and Trad use to travel. He faces pressure from his mother, who wants him to get a job and start a family of his own.
- Saad (Voiced by Malik Nejer): A man who acts foolish. A former child prodigy and alumnus of MIT, a series of accidents on his way home caused him to be the way he is. He struggles with speaking due to dysarthia and has yellow eyes due to viral hepatitis.
- Trad (Voiced by Malik Nejer): is an anthropomorphic dog whose ancestors are wolves. He is sometimes seen leading the two men. In one episode, he was revealed to be a long-lost member of an aristocratic British family.

=== Recurring Characters ===
- Dr. Adel: (Voiced by Malik Nejer) An overweight doctor.
- Dr. Nafea
- Dr. Barbain
- Hizam: (Voiced by Malik Nejer) is a wise man but has a history of reckless driving.
- Sisteen
- Bandar (Voiced by Abdulaziz Alshehri): A wealthy man who is depicted as an entrepreneur, a sheikh, the head of Bandar Contracting as seen in Outer Space Toilet and opened a restaurant named Pink Love Restaurants For Traditional Saudi Food in one episode. As a child, he had abusive parents who punished him for going outside by putting him in his room.
- Mane
- Aqeel
- Sweiket
- The Pixel
- Mani'
- Nafi'
- Shalash
- Abdul Jalil
- Rashed
- Sultan
- Awad
- Waseem
- Khalaf
- Muneer
- Mazen
- Abdullah
- Abu Fahd

=== Minor Characters ===
- Lion: An emaciated lion
- Reem: Rashed's sister
- Hessa: A chef who knows how to cook kabsa, she died after falling into a kabsa pot she was stirring.

The series features many fictional secondary characters, including friends, townspeople, coworkers, and others. Some episodes feature cameos from characters and public figures such as Mohammed Abdu, Abbadi Al-Johar, Fidel Castro, Ziad Rahbani, Hosni Mubarak, Mickey Mouse, and Popeye. Famous basketball player Dwyane Wade appeared in one episode, where he portrayed himself.
