= List of animated feature films of 2025 =

This is a list of animated feature films that were released in 2025.

== List ==
Title	Country	Director	Production company	Animation technique	Notes	Release date	Duration
100 Meters	Japan	Kenji Iwaisawa	Rock 'n' Roll Mountain	Traditional		June 9, 2025 (Annecy); September 19, 2025 (Japan); December 31, 2025 (Worldwide)	106 minutes
Aikatsu! x PriPara THE MOVIE: -Miraculous Meeting-	Japan	Takahiro Okawa	BN Pictures; Syn Sophia; Takara Tomy Arts	Traditional		October 10, 2025	75 minutes
Allah Is Not Obliged	France; Luxembourg; Belgium; Canada	Zaven Najjar	Creative Touch Studios; Paul Thiltges Distribution; Need Production; Lunamine; Yzanakio	CG animation Traditional		June 9, 2025	77 minutes
All You Need Is Kill	Japan	Kenichiro Akimoto	Studio 4°C	CG animation Traditional		June 9, 2025 (Annecy); January 9, 2026 (Japan)	82 minutes
Animal Farm	Canada; United Kingdom; United States	Andy Serkis	6th & Idaho Productions; The Imaginarium Studios; Aniventure; Cinesite	CG animation		June 9, 2025 (Annecy); May 1, 2026 (United States)	96 minutes
Another World	Hong Kong	Tommy Kai Chung Ng	Point Five Productions; SILVER MEDIA GROUP; Film Development Council	Traditional		June 16, 2025 (Annecy); October 29, 2025 (Hong Kong, Macau); December 25, 2025 (Malaysia); January 30, 2026 (United Kingdom, Ireland)	111 minutes
Anpanman: Chapon's Hero!	Japan	Toshikazu Hashimoto	TMS Entertainment	Traditional		June 27, 2025	89 minutes
Arco	France	Ugo Bienvenu	Fit Via Vi Film Productions; MountainA; Remembers	Traditional		May 16, 2025 (Cannes); October 22, 2025 (France); November 14, 2025 (United States)	82 minutes
As One	Japan	Kōbun Shizuno	Honoo; Studio Gooneys	Traditional		August 22, 2025	91 minutes
Awakening Beauty	Spain; United States	Manuel H. Martín; Amparo Martínez Barco	La Claqueta PC	Traditional		October 27, 2025 (Seminci); November 28, 2025 (Spain)	61 minutes
Aztec Batman: Clash of Empires	Mexico; United States	Juan Meza-León	Warner Bros. Animation; DC Studios; Ánima; Chatrone; Particular Crowd	Flash animation		September 18, 2025 (Mexico); September 19, 2025 (United States)	89 minutes
The Bad Guys 2	United States	Pierre Perifel	Universal Pictures; DreamWorks Animation	CG animation		July 25, 2025 (United Kingdom); August 1, 2025 (United States)	104 minutes
Barbie & Teresa: Recipe for Friendship	United States	Karen J. Lloyd	Mainframe Studios; Mattel Television	CG animation		March 6, 2025	60 minutes
Batman Ninja vs. Yakuza League	United States; Japan	Junpei Mizusaki; Shinji Takagi	Warner Bros. Japan; DC Entertainment; Warner Bros. Animation; Kamikaze Douga; YamatoWorks; Barnum Studio	Traditional; CG animation		March 18, 2025	89 minutes
Bebefinn Sing-Along Movie: Into the Pinkfong World	South Korea	Byeon Hee-sun; Sujeong Han; Sunyoung Moon	The Pinkfong Company	CG animation		July 23, 2025 (South Korea); July 25, 2025 (United Kingdom & Ireland)	65 minutes
Berry and Dolly - Tales from the Polka Dot House; Bogyó és Babóca 7 - Mesék a pöttyös házból	Hungary	Géza M. Tóth; Kinga Fazakas	Kedd Animation Studio	Flash animation		August 14, 2025 (Hungary)	70 minutes
BFF. Turbo Adventure Marathon	Lithuania; Slovakia	Urte Oettinger; Ignas Meilunas	Art Shot Studios	Flash animation		May 16, 2025	55 minutes
Boonie Bears: Future Reborn	China	Lin Yongchang	Fantawild	CG animation		January 29, 2025	108 minutes
Bouchra; For Aicha	Italy; Morocco; United States	Meriem Bennani; Orian Barki	Fondazione Prada; 2 Lizards Production; Hi Production; SB Films	CG animation		October 31, 2024 (Milan); September 5, 2025 (Toronto); September 27, 2025 (New York); October 10, 2025 (Bordeaux) October 19, 2025 (Rome); 2026 (United States)	73 minutes (original cut); 83 minutes (festival run)
Boys Go to Jupiter	United States	Julian Glander	Glanderco	CG animation		June 7, 2024 (Tribeca); August 8, 2025 (United States)	90 minutes
Captain Sabertooth and the Countess of Grel	Norway	Are Austnes; Yaprak Morali; Rasmus A. Sivertsen	Qvisten Animation	CG animation		February 7, 2025	77 minutes
Chainsaw Man – The Movie: Reze Arc	Japan	Tatsuya Yoshihara	MAPPA	Traditional		September 19, 2025	100 minutes
ChaO	Japan	Yasuhiro Aoki	Studio 4°C	Traditional		August 15, 2025	90 minutes
Charlie the Wonderdog	Canada	Shea Wageman	ICON Creative Studio	CG animation		October 24, 2025 (Poland); January 16, 2026 (North America)	92 minutes
Checkered Ninja 3	Denmark	Thorbjørn Christoffersen; Anders Matthesen	A. Film; Pop Up Production; Sudoku ApS	CG animation		August 21, 2025	88 minutes
Chickenhare and the Secret of the Groundhog	Belgium; France	Benjamin Mousquet	nWave Pictures; Octopolis	CG animation		June 12, 2025 (Annecy); October 10, 2025 (United States); October 15, 2025 (France)	88 minutes
Clockwork Girl	Japan	Yasuomi Umetsu	Shaft	Traditional		June 27, 2025	35 minutes
Cocoon	Japan	Toko Ina	Sasayuri	Traditional		March 30, 2025 (early broadcast); August 25, 2025 (main broadcast)	60 minutes
Colorful Stage! The Movie: A Miku Who Can't Sing	Japan	Hiroyuki Hata	P.A. Works	Traditional		January 17, 2025	105 minutes
Crayon Shin-chan the Movie: Super Hot! The Spicy Kasukabe Dancers	Japan	Masakazu Hashimoto	Shin-Ei Animation	Traditional		August 8, 2025	105 minutes
Cute High Earth Defense Club Eternal Love!	Japan	Shinji Takamatsu	Studio Comet	Traditional		January 24, 2025	81 minutes
Dan Da Dan: Evil Eye	Japan	Fūga Yamashiro; Abel Góngora	Science Saru	Traditional		May 30, 2025	93 minutes
Dandelion Odyssey	Belgium; France	Momoko Seto	ARTE France Cinéma; Ecce Films; Fondation Gan pour le Cinéma; Umedia	CG animation Stop-Motion; Live-action		May 22, 2025 (Cannes)	75 minutes
David	United States	Brent Dawes; Phil Cunningham	2521 Entertainment; Slingshot Productions; Sunrise Animation Studios	CG animation		December 19, 2025	115 minutes
Death Does Not Exist	Canada; France	Félix Dufour-Laperrière	Embuscade Films; Miyu	Traditional		May 15, 2025 (Cannes)	72 minutes
Decorado	Spain; Portugal	Alberto Vázquez	Abano Producións; Uniko Estudio Creativo; Glow Animation; Sardinha Em Lata; María y Arnold AIE	Traditional		September 21, 2025 (Fantastic Fest); October 24, 2025 (Spain)	95 minutes
Demon Slayer: Kimetsu no Yaiba – The Movie: Infinity Castle	Japan	Haruo Sotozaki	Ufotable; Aniplex; Toho; Crunchyroll	Traditional		July 18, 2025 (Part 1)	155 minutes (Part 1)
Detective Conan: One-eyed Flashback	Japan	Katsuya Shigehara	TMS Entertainment	Traditional		April 18, 2025	110 minutes
Diary of a Wimpy Kid: The Last Straw	United States; Canada	Matt Danner; Gino Nichele	Walt Disney Pictures; Bardel Entertainment; 20th Century Animation	CG animation		December 5, 2025	78 minutes
Dive in Wonderland	Japan	Toshiya Shinohara	P.A. Works	Traditional		August 29, 2025	95 minutes
Dog Man	United States	Peter Hastings	Universal Pictures; DreamWorks Animation	CG animation		January 15, 2025 (Festival de l'Alpe d'Huez 2025); January 31, 2025 (United States)	89 minutes
Dog of God	Latvia; United States	Lauris Ābele; Raitis Ābele	Tritone Studio; Lumiere Lab	Rotoscope		June 6, 2025 (Tribeca Film Festival); September 2, 2025 (Latvia)	92 minutes
Dolphin Boy 2	Iran	Mohammad Kheirandish	Sky Frame	CG animation		February 6, 2025 (Fajr); February 21, 2025 (Iran)	96 minutes
Dragon Heart: Adventures Beyond This World	Japan	Isamu Imakake	HS Pictures Studio; IRH Productions	Traditional		May 23, 2025	119 minutes
Doraemon: Nobita's Art World Tales	Japan	Yukiyo Teramoto	Shin-Ei Animation	Traditional		March 7, 2025	105 minutes
Eiga Odekake Kozame Tokai no Otomodachi	Japan	Chihiro Kumano	ENGI	Traditional		August 22, 2025	74 minutes
Ejen Ali The Movie 2	Malaysia	Usamah Zaid Yasin	WAU Animation; Komet Productions	CG animation		May 22, 2025	115 minutes
Elio	United States	Domee Shi; Adrian Molina; Madeline Sharafian	Disney; Pixar Animation Studios	CG animation		June 10, 2025 (El Capitan Theatre); June 20, 2025 (United States)	99 minutes
Endless Cookie	Canada	Seth Scriver; Peter Scriver	Scythia Films	Traditional	Documentary	January 25, 2025 (Sundance); June 13, 2025 (Canada)	97 minutes
Exorcism Chronicles: The Beginning 퇴마록	South Korea	Kim Dong-chul	Locus Animation Studios	CG animation		June 13, 2024 (Annecy); February 21, 2025 (South Korea)	85 minutes
Falcon Express	France	Benoît Daffis; Jean-Christian Tassy	TAT Productions; France 3 Cinéma; Apollo Films	CG animation		June 12, 2025 (Annecy); July 2, 2025 (France)	99 minutes
The Fantastic Four: First Steps	United States	Matt Shakman	Marvel Studios	CG Animation; Live-action		July 21, 2025 (Dorothy Chandler Pavilion); July 25, 2025 (United States)	114 minutes
Finnick 2	Russia	Denis Chernov	Riki Group	CG animation		October 23, 2025	85 minutes
Fixed	United States	Genndy Tartakovsky	Netflix; Sony Pictures Animation	Traditional		June 11, 2025 (Annecy); August 13, 2025 (Netflix)	85 minutes
Flåklypa – From Paris to the Pyramids	Norway	Rasmus A. Sivertsen	Qvisten Animation	CG animation		December 25, 2025	82 minutes
Gabby's Dollhouse: The Movie	United States	Ryan Crego	Universal Pictures; DreamWorks Animation	CG animation Live-action		September 26, 2025	98 minutes
A Garden Cartoon Movie: The Greatest Thing Ever!	United States	Butch Hartman	Billionfold, Inc.	Flash animation		July 1, 2025	82 minutes
Grand Prix of Europe	Germany	Waldemar Fast	Mack Magic; Timeless Films	CG animation		July 24, 2025 (Germany); August 22, 2025 (United Kingdom)	98 minutes
Gekijōban Boku to Roboco	Japan	Akitaro Daichi	Gallop	Traditional		April 18, 2025	64 minutes
Girls und Panzer: Motto Love Love Sakusen Desu! – Act 1	Japan	Masami Shimoda; Takahiko Usui	P.A. Works; Actas	Traditional		December 26, 2025 (Act 1)	77 minutes
Happy Heroes: Rebel Rescue	China	Huang Weiming	Alpha Group; Guangdong Mingxing Chuangyi Cartoon; China Film Distribution Co. Ltd. FilmGathering Sky (Beijing) Culture Media Co., Ltd. Creative Power Entertaining	Traditional		May 1, 2025	99 minutes
The Haunted House: 10th anniversary Movie 신비아파트 10주년 극장판	South Korea		CJ ENM; Studio BAZOOKA	Traditional		December 2025	
Heidi: Rescue of the Lynx	Germany; Spain; Belgium	Toby Schwarz; Aizea Roca Berridi	Studio 100 International; Hotel Hungaria Animations; 3 Doubles Produccione; Studio Isar Animation	CG animation		June 4, 2025 (Golden Sparrow - German Children's Film and Media Festival); June 26, 2025 (Germany); August 1, 2025 (United Kingdom); August 22, 2025 (Spain)	78 minutes
How to Train Your Dragon	United States	Dean DeBlois	DreamWorks Animation; Universal Pictures; Marc Platt Productions	CG Animation; Live-action		April 2, 2025 (CinemaCon); June 13, 2025 (United States)	125 minutes
Handbok för superhjältar	Sweden	Patrik Forsberg	Stiller Studios; Qvisten Animation; SF Studios; Sveriges Television	CG animation		December 25, 2025	91 minutes
Hypnosis Mic: Division Rap Battle	Japan	Takanori Tsujimoto	Polygon Pictures	CG animation Traditional		February 21, 2025	100 minutes
I'm Bond, GG Bond	China	Lu Jinming	WinSing Animation	CG animation		October 1, 2025	89 minutes
I Am Frankelda	Mexico	Arturo and Roy Ambriz	Cinema Fantasma; Warner Bros. Discovery; Cine Vendaval; Woo Films	Stop-Motion		June 6, 2025 (FICG); October 23, 2025 (Mexico)	113 minutes
In Your Dreams	United States	Alex Woo; Erik Benson	Netflix Animation; Kuku Studios	CG animation		November 7, 2025 (United States); November 14, 2025 (Netflix)	90 minutes
Iyanu: The Age of Wonders	United States	Saxton Moore	Lion Forge Animation	Traditional		August 30, 2025	90 minutes
Jujutsu Kaisen: Hidden Inventory/Premature Death - The Movie	Japan	Shouta Goshozono	MAPPA; Toho Animation	Traditional		May 30, 2025	110 minutes
Jumbo	Indonesia	Ryan Adriandhy	Visinema Animation	CG animation		March 31, 2025	102 minutes
Jungle Beat 2: The Past	Mauritius; South Africa	Sam Wilson; Brent Dawes	Sunrise Productions; Sandcastle Studios	CG animation		April 10, 2025 (Russia); June 26, 2025 (South Africa)	87 minutes
Kaitō Queen no Yūga na Kyūka	Japan	Shigetaka Ikeda	East Fish Studio	Traditional		May 23, 2025	88 minutes
Kayara	Peru; Spain	Cesar Zelada	B-Water Studios; Tunche Films	CG animation		January 2, 2025 (Ukraine); March 6, 2025 (Peru)	90 minutes
The King of Kings	United States; South Korea	Seong-ho Jang	Angel Studios; Blue Harbor Entertainment; Giantstep; Mofac Animation	CG animation		April 11, 2025	101 minutes
King of Water	Iran	Majid Esmaeili		CG animation		August 8, 2025	81 minutes
KPop Demon Hunters	United States	Maggie Kang; Chris Appelhans	Netflix; Sony Pictures Animation	CG animation		June 20, 2025	100 minutes
The Land of Sometimes	United Kingdom	Leon Joosen	Nottage Productions; Two Daughters Entertainment	CG animation		October 30, 2025 (United Kingdom); January 18, 2026 (United States)	93 minutes
The Last Blossom	Japan	Baku Kinoshita	CLAP	Traditional		October 10, 2025	90 minutes
The Last Whale Singer	Germany; Czech Republic; Canada	Reza Memari	Telescope Animation; PFX; La Boîte à Fanny	CG animation		September 28, 2025 (Schlingel); February 12, 2026 (Germany)	91 minutes
The Legend of Hei II	China	MTJJ; Gu Jie	HMCH	Traditional		July 18, 2025	120 minutes
Lesbian Space Princess	Australia	Emma Hough Hobbs; Leela Varghese	We Made A Thing Studios	Traditional; Flash animation		February 16, 2025 (Berlinale); September 11, 2025 (Australia)	86 minutes
The Light of Aisha	Spain; Germany; Singapur	Shadi Adib	M.A.R.K.13™ Mago Productions	CG animation		March 2025 (Málaga); April 11, 2025 (Spain)	85 minutes
Light of the World	United States	John Schafer	Salvation Poem Project	Traditional; Flash animation		June 6, 2025 (THSC State Convention); September 5, 2025 (United States)	91 minutes
Lilo & Stitch	United States	Dean Fleischer	Walt Disney Pictures; Rideback	CG animation Live-action		May 17, 2025 (El Capitan Theatre); May 23, 2025 (United States)	108 minutes
Little Amélie or the Character of Rain	France	Liane-Cho Han Jin Kuang; Mailys Vallade	Ikki Films; Maybe Movies	Traditional		May 20, 2025 (Cannes); June 25, 2025 (France)	77 minutes
Love Live! Nijigasaki High School Idol Club Final Chapter (Part 1)	Japan	Tomoyuki Kawamura	Sunrise	Traditional		November 7, 2025	75 minutes
Long Distance	United States	Josh Gordon and Will Speck	Universal Pictures; DreamWorks Pictures; Reliance Entertainment; Automatik	CG Animation; Live-action		July 12, 2024 (Vietnam); July 3, 2025 (United States; released on Hulu)	87 minutes
Lost in Starlight	South Korea	Han Ji-won	Netflix	Traditional		May 30, 2025	96 minutes
The Lost Tiger	Australia	Chantelle Murray	Alceon Entertainment Partners; Like A Photon Creative; Maslow Entertainment; Screen Australia; Screen Queensland Studios	CG animation		October 26, 2024 (Brisbane International Film Festival); January 11, 2025 (Perth Festival); February 27, 2025 (Australia)	81 minutes
A Loud House Christmas Movie: Naughty or Nice	United States	Darin McGowan	Nickelodeon Animation Studio	Flash animation		November 21, 2025	81 minutes
Lupin the IIIrd the Movie: The Immortal Bloodline	Japan	Takeshi Koike	Telecom Animation Film; TMS Entertainment	Traditional		June 27, 2025	93 minutes
A Magnificent Life	France; Belgium; United States; Luxembourg	Sylvain Chomet	What The Prod; Mediawan; Bidibul Productions; Walking The Dog	Traditional		May 17, 2025 (Cannes); October 15, 2025 (France)	90 minutes
Mahavatar Narsimha	India	Ashwin Kumar	Hombale Films; Kleem Productions	CG animation		November 25, 2024 (IFFI); July 25, 2025 (India)	131 minutes (theatrical); 141 minutes (IFFI)
Make a Girl	Japan	Genshō Yasuda	Yasuda Gensho Studio by Xenotoon	CG animation		January 31, 2025	90 minutes
Masameer Junior	Saudi Arabia	Malik Nejer	Myrkott Animation Studio; Sirb Productions; Netflix	Flash animation		June 12, 2025	72 minutes
Miss Kobayashi's Dragon Maid: A Lonely Dragon Wants to Be Loved	Japan	Tatsuya Ishihara	Crunchyroll	Traditional		June 27, 2025	105 minutes
Miss Moxy	Netherlands; Belgium	Vincent Bal; Wip Vernooij	Phanta Animation; BosBros; Eyeworks Film & TV Drama; Polder Animation	CG animation		June 6, 2025 (Lithuania); January 28, 2026 (Netherlands)	88 minutes
Mission Santa: Yoyo to the Rescue	United States; Germany; India	Ricard Cussó; Damjan Mitrevski	Toon2Tango; Curiosity Ink Media; M.A.R.K.13™ Studio 56	CG animation		November 6, 2025	91 minutes
Mobile Suit Gundam GQuuuuuuX	Japan	Kazuya Tsurumaki	Sunrise; Studio Khara	Traditional		January 17, 2025	81 minutes
Mononoke the Movie: The Ashes of Rage	Japan	Kenji Nakamura	EOTA; Crew-Cell	Traditional		March 14, 2025	74 minutes
Motu Patlu & The Madness of Multiverse	India	Dheeraj Berry	Nickelodeon	CG animation		October 21, 2025	68 minutes
Motu Patlu & The Mighty Magnathor	India	Dheeraj Berry	Nickelodeon	CG animation		May 18, 2025	67 minutes
Motu Patlu and the Case of Project X	India	Dheeraj Berry	Nickelodeon	CG animation		March 14, 2025	46 minutes
Motu Patlu vs. the Ghost House	India	Dheeraj Berry	Nickelodeon	CG animation		August 15, 2025	45 minutes
My Grandfather is a Nihonjin	Brazil	Célia Catunda	PinGuim Content	Flash animation		October 2, 2025	84 minutes
Ne Zha 2	China	Jiaozi	Chengdu Coco Cartoon; Beijing Enlight Media; Beijing Enlight Pictures; Chengdu Zizai Jingjie Culture Media; Beijing Coloroom Technology	CG animation		January 29, 2025	144 minutes
Nimuendajú	Brazil; France; Germany	Tania Anaya	Anaya Produções; Zebra Cinema	Traditional		June 9, 2025	84 minutes
Nobody	China	Yu Shui	Shanghai Animation Film Studio	Traditional		August 2, 2025	118 minutes
Olivia and the Invisible Earthquake	Spain; France; Belgium; Chile; Switzerland	Irene Iborra Rizo	Bígaro Films; Citoplasmas Stop Motion Studio; Cornelius Films; Panique; Pájaro Estudio; Terremoto AIE; Vivement Lundi	Stop-Motion		June 10, 2025 (Annecy); November 21, 2025 (Spain)	70 minutes
Paddington in Peru	United Kingdom; France; United States	Dougal Wilson	StudioCanal	CG animation Live-action		November 8, 2024 (United Kingdom); February 14, 2025 (United States); February 5, 2025 (France)	106 minutes
Papa Zola: The Movie	Malaysia	Nizam Razak	Animonsta Studios	CG animation		December 6, 2025 (GSC); December 11, 2025	111 minutes
Papaya	Brazil	Priscilla Kellen	Birdo Studio			October 11, 2025 (Rio); February 15, 2026 (Berlinale)	74 minutes
Peppa Meets the Baby Cinema Experience	United Kingdom	Gretchen Mallorie	Hasbro	Flash animation		May 30, 2025	65 minutes
Peleliu: Guernica of Paradise	Japan	Gorō Kuji	Shin-Ei Animation; Fugaku	Traditional		December 5, 2025	106 minutes
Plankton: The Movie	United States	Dave Needham	Nickelodeon Movies; Netflix	CG animation		March 7, 2025	87 minutes
Pleasant Goat and Big Big Wolf: Bright New Dawn	China	Hui Yan Chen		Traditional		July 26, 2025	96 minutes
Pororo Movie: Sweet Castle Adventure 뽀로로 극장판 바닷속 대모험	South Korea	Cheon Yu-rim	Ocon Studios	CG Animation		December 11, 2025	66 minutes
Pororo: The Great Undersea Adventure 뽀로로 극장판 바닷속 대모험	South Korea	Yoon Je-wan	Ocon Studios	CG Animation		January 1, 2025	71 minutes
Predator: Killer of Killers	United States	Dan Trachtenberg; Micho Robert Rutare	20th Century Studios; Davis Entertainment; The Third Floor, Inc. 20th Century Animation	CG animation		June 5, 2025 (Tribeca Festival); June 6, 2025 (United States)	85 minutes
Princess Principal: Crown Handler – Chapter 4	Japan	Masaki Tachibana	Actas	Traditional		May 23, 2025	59 minutes
The Quest; Csongor és Tünde	Hungary	Csaba Máli; Zsolt Pálfi	Cinemon Entertainment	Traditional		April 17, 2025	82 minutes
The Rose of Versailles	Japan	Ai Yoshimura	MAPPA	Traditional		January 31, 2025	113 minutes
Saurus City	United States	Nathan Smith	Infinity Rising; 405 Productions; BarnLight Studios; Bonfire Entertainment; Suspended Animation Studios; Archstone Entertainment	Stop-Motion		May 15, 2025 (Annecy)	83 minutes
Scarlet	Japan	Mamoru Hosoda	Studio Chizu	Traditional; CG animation		September 4, 2025 (Venice); November 21, 2025 (Japan)	111 minutes
Secret Magic Control Agency II: Mission Sleeping Beauty	Russia	Alex Tsitsillin	Voronezh Animation Studio; CTB Film Company; Magic Frame Animation; QED International; Creation Entertainment Media	CG animation		May 22, 2025	90 minutes
Senpai Is an Otokonoko: Sunshine After the Rain	Japan	Shinsuke Yanagi; Kenta Ōnishi; In Seob Choi; Keisuke Aida; Zi Hao Xuan	Project No.9	Traditional		February 14, 2025	82 minutes
Smurfs	United States	Chris Miller	Paramount Animation; Marcy Media Films; LAFIG Belgium; Peyo Company	CG animation Live-action		June 28, 2025 (Brussels); July 18, 2025 (United States)	92 minutes
Sneaks	United States; United Kingdom; India; Canada	Rob Edwards; Chris Jenkins	Lengi Studios; Cinema Gypsy Productions; House of Cool; Assemblage Entertainment; GFM Animation; Ashland Hill Media Finance; RTG Features; Rabbits Black; Waffle Iron Entertainment	CG animation		March 28, 2025 (United Kingdom); April 18, 2025 (United States)	93 minutes
Snow White and the 7 Dwarfs	United States	Michael Johnson; Erica Duke	The Asylum	CG animation		March 7, 2025	91 minutes
Space Cadet	Canada	Kid Koala	Les Film Outsiders	CG animation		February 16, 2025 (Berlinale)	86 minutes
Spiked	United Kingdom; Luxembourg; France; Belgium	Caroline Origer	Fabrique d'Images; Fantabulous; Freaks Factory; Iheartcinema; Iron Box Films; Kapers Animation	CG animation		August 29, 2025	85 minutes
The SpongeBob Movie: Search for SquarePants	United States	Derek Drymon	Paramount Animation; Nickelodeon Movies; United Plankton Pictures	CG animation Live-action		October 26, 2025 (AFI Film Festival); December 19, 2025 (United States)	88 minutes
Stitch Head	Germany; Luxembourg; France; United Kingdom; India	Steve Hudson; Toby Genkel	Gringo Films; Aniventure; Assemblage Entertainment; Fabrique d'Images; GFM Animation; Senator Film; Traumhaus Studios; Wild Bunch	CG animation		June 10, 2025 (Annecy); October 16, 2025 (Germany); October 29, 2025 (United States); February 6, 2026 (United Kingdom)	89 minutes
Sumikko Gurashi: The Sky Kingdom and the Two Children	Japan	Naomi Iwata	Fanworks	Traditional		October 31, 2025	68 minutes
Tafiti - Across the Desert	Germany	Nina Wels	Little Dream Entertainment; Red Parrot Studios; Tradewind Pictures	CG animation		September 4, 2025	81 minutes
Tales from the Magic Garden	Czech Republic; Slovakia; Slovenia; France	David Súkup; Jean-Claude Rozec; Patrik Pašš; Leon Vidmar	Artichoke Film Production; MAUR Film; Vivement Lundi; Zvviks	Stop-Motion		February 16, 2025 (Berlinale); November 6, 2025 (Czech Republic)	71 minutes
Toi-san	Japan	Mankyū	Seven Arcs	Traditional		July 18, 2025	90 minutes
Tom and Jerry: Forbidden Compass	China	Gang Zhang	Warner Bros. Pictures; China Film Group; Original Force Animation; Origin Animation	CG animation		June 20, 2025 (Shanghai International Film Festival); August 2, 2025 (China)	104 minutes
A Tooth Fairy Tale	United States	Michael Johnson	Rebellion Animation; Plaza Mayor Company	CG animation		May 20, 2025	90 minutes
Toritsukare Otoko	Japan	Wataru Takahashi	Shin-Ei Animation	Traditional		November 7, 2025	97 minutes
The Treasure of Barracuda	Spain; Belgium	Adrià García	Inicia Films; Hampa Animation Studio; Belvision	Flash animation		September 20, 2025 (Cines Bonaire); September 26, 2025 (Spain)	87 minutes
Twins Hinahima	Japan	Kō Nakano	KaKa Technology Studio	Traditional		March 28, 2025	24 minutes
The Twits	United States; United Kingdom	Phil Johnston; Katie Shanahan; Todd Demong	Netflix Animation; Jellyfish Pictures	CG animation		October 17, 2025	98 minutes
Whoever Steals This Book	Japan	Daisei Fukuoka	Kagokan	Traditional		December 26, 2025	85 minutes
The Witcher: Sirens of the Deep	United States; South Korea; Poland	Kang Hei Chul	Netflix; Studio Mir; Platige Image; Hivemind	Traditional		February 11, 2025	91 minutes
Yooz	Iran	Reza Arzangi	Soure Cinema Development Organization	CG animation		September 23, 2025	90 minutes
You and Idol Pretty Cure the Movie: For You! Our Kirakilala Concert!	Japan	Kōji Ogawa	Toei Animation	Traditional		September 12, 2025	71 minutes
Your Letter	South Korea	Kim Yong-Hwan	Studio N Studio Lico	Traditional		September 27, 2024 (OIAF); October 1, 2025 (South Korea)	96 minutes
Zombie Land Saga: Yumeginga Paradise	Japan	Kōnosuke Uda (Note: Credited as "Chief Director" (総監督, Sō Kantoku)); Takafumi Ushida; Takeru Satō	MAPPA	Traditional		October 24, 2025	122 minutes
Zootopia 2	United States	Jared Bush; Byron Howard	Walt Disney Animation Studios	CG animation		November 13, 2025 (El Capitan Theatre); November 26, 2025 (United States)	108 minutes

== Highest-grossing animated films ==
The following is a list of the 10 highest-grossing animated feature films first released in 2025.

Rank	Title	Distributor	Worldwide gross	Ref
1	Ne Zha 2	Enlight Pictures	$2,215,690,000	
2	Zootopia 2	Disney	$1,870,309,291	
3	Demon Slayer: Infinity Castle	Toho/Sony	$793,594,078	
4	The Bad Guys 2	Universal Pictures	$239,408,923	
5	Nobody	Shanghai Animation Film Studio	$218,440,114	
6	Chainsaw Man – The Movie: Reze Arc	Toho/Sony	$181,115,803	
7	The SpongeBob Movie: Search for SquarePants	Paramount Pictures	$169,269,936	
8	Detective Conan: One-eyed Flashback	Toho	$166,061,012	
9	Elio	Disney	$154,291,182	
10	Dog Man	Universal Pictures	$145,885,375	

=== Box office records ===
- Ne Zha 2 became the 57th film to gross $1 billion worldwide, the 14th animated film, the seventh film to gross $2 billion worldwide, the third-fastest film to cross the billion-dollar mark at 12 days, and the second-fastest to gross the $2 billion mark.
  - It surpassed The Battle at Lake Changjin to become the highest-grossing Chinese film and the highest-grossing non-English film. It became the highest-grossing animated film of all time as well as the 5th highest-grossing film overall.
  - It surpassed Inside Out 2 (2024) as the highest grossing animated film, breaking Disney's 14-year streak with the title after regaining it with Toy Story 3 (2010). Doing so, Enlight Pictures became the first non-Hollywood studio to hold this distinction.
  - It surpassed The Super Mario Bros. Movie (2023) as the highest-grossing non-Disney or pixar animated film of all time, and the first film since Shrek 2 (2004) not to be distributed by Universal Pictures to hold the milestone.
  - It became the 57th film to gross $1 billion worldwide and the 14th animated film to do so.
  - It became the first Chinese and the first non-English film to gross $1 billion worldwide.
  - it surpass Moana 2 as the biggest opening weekend for an animated film.
  - It surpassed Star Wars: The Force Awakens to become the highest-grossing film ever in a single market. It also became the first film to earn $1 billion in a single market.
  - On March 2, 33 days after release, Ne Zha 2 surpassed $2 billion, the first animated film in history to do so. It is the seventh film overall to achieve this milestone.
  - It also became the first film in history to exceed $2 billion worldwide without also grossing $100, $200, $300, $400, $500, and $600 million in North America.
  - The Fengshen Cinematic Universe became the first Chinese and the first non-English film franchise to gross $2 billion and $3 billion with the release of Ne Zha 2.
- Jumbo achieved a million admissions in seven days in domestic theatrical run, becoming the highest-grossing Indonesian animated film. It became the highest-grossing Southeast Asian animation film of all time for earning over $8 million, surpassing Malaysian 2022 film Mechamato Movie.
  - It surpassed KKN di Desa Penari to become Indonesian film with the most admissions.
- Doraemon: Nobita's Art World Tales It remained at 1 at the Japanese box office for the first 6 weeks prior to Detective Conan: One-eyed Flashback's release, making it the longest-running 1 film in the Doraemon film series.
- Elio grossed only $21 million in its opening weekend, making it the lowest-grossing film in Pixar history.
- Demon Slayer: Infinity Castle surpasses The Simpsons Movie to becoming as the highest-grossing adult animated film.
- Nobody became the highest-grossing 2D animated film in China and the highest-grossing Chinese 2D animated film
- Zootopia 2 became the 59th film overall, the 15th animated film, and the second-fastest animated film (at 17 days, behind Ne Zha 2’s 12 days) to gross $1 billion worldwide.
  - It claimed the fourth highest-grossing worldwide opening of all time ($560.3 million), placing behind Avengers: Endgame ($1.2 billion), Avengers: Infinity War ($641 million), and Spider-Man: No Way Home ($601 million).
  - It set the records of highest-grossing worldwide opening for an animated film, and highest-grossing worldwide opening of the year, surpassing Ne Zha 2 in both instances. It is also the highest-grossing worldwide opening of any animated film in Disney history, surpassing Moana 2.
  - On 12 December, seventeen days after release, Zootopia 2 became the fastest MPA animated film, and PG-rated film, to reach $1 billion, surpassing Inside Out 2’s 19 days in both instances.
  - On 31 December, thirty-six days after release, Zootopia 2 surpassed Frozen 2 to become Walt Disney Animation Studios' highest-grossing film.
  - On 18 January, fifty-four days after release, Zootopia 2 surpassed Inside Out 2 to become Disney's highest-grossing animated film of all time, the highest-grossing MPA animated film of all time, and the highest-grossing PG-rated film of all time.
  - The Zootopia film franchise surpassed $2.8 billion with the release of Zootopia 2.

== See also ==
- List of animated television series of 2025
