= List of animated television series of 2025 =

This is a list of animated television series that aired in 2025.

Title	Seasons	Episodes	Country	Year	Original channel	Technique
#1 Happy Family USA	1	8	United States	2025–present	Amazon Prime Video	Flash
7 Bears	1	10	United States	2025	Netflix	CGI
Acoustic Rooster: Jazzy Jams	1	8	United States	2025	PBS Kids	Flash
Armorsaurs	1	13	United Kingdom; United States; South Korea	2025–present	Disney XD	Live-action/CGI
Asterix and Obelix: The Big Fight	1	5	France	2025	Netflix	CGI
The Bad Guys: The Series	2	19	United States	2025–present	Netflix	CGI
Badjelly	1	13	New Zealand; Canada	2025	TVNZ; Family Channel	Flash
Bat-Fam	1	10	United States	2025–present	Amazon Prime Video	Flash
Bearbrick	1	13	United States	2025	Apple TV+	CGI
BeddyByes	1	52	United Kingdom; Ireland	2025–present	CBeebies; RTÉ KIDSjr; Disney Jr.	CGI
Belfort & Lupin	1	26	France	2025	France 4 Okoo	CGI/Traditional
Beatiale	1	26	France	2025	YouTube	Flash/Traditional
Bittu Bahanebazz			India	2025	Nickelodeon Sonic	
The Boxer	1	12	South Korea	2025		Traditional
Champions	1	52	Russia	2025	Multilandia	Flash
Charlotte's Web	1	3	United States	2025	HBO Max	CGI
The Chosen Adventures	1	14	United States	2025–present	Amazon Prime Video	CGI
Chote Tara Ka Bada Gadar	2	20	India	2025–present	Zee5	
Common Side Effects	1	10	United States	2025–present	Adult Swim	Flash
Cuestión deMente	1	12	Chile	2025	NTV	Flash
The Dead Sea Squirrels	1	13	United States	2025	Minmo	Flash
Devil May Cry	1	10	South Korea; United States	2025–present	Netflix	Traditional
Dino Ranch: Island Explorers	1	26	Canada	2025–present	CBC Kids; Ici Radio-Canada Télé; Cartoonito	CGI
Do Not Watch This Show	2	22	Australia	2025–present	ABC Family	Flash
Dog Days Out	1	8	South Korea	2025	Netflix	CGI
Dr. Seuss's Horton!	2	13	United States	2025–present	Netflix	CGI
Dr. Seuss's Red Fish, Blue Fish	3	10	United States	2025–present	Netflix	Flash
Emerald	1	19	United Kingdom	2025–present	Sky Kids	Flash
Eyes of Wakanda	1	4	United States	2025	Disney+	CGI
Goldie	1	13	United States	2025–present	Apple TV+	Flash
Green Apple Paradise			South Korea	2025	KBS 1	Traditional
Gupi	TBA	TBA	Turkey	2025	Netflix	CGI
Haha, You Clowns	1	10	United States	2025–present	Adult Swim	Flash/Traditional
Haunted Hotel	2	18	United States	2025–present	Netflix	Flash
The Hundred Acre Wood’s Winnie-the-Pooh	TBA	TBA	United States	2025	TBA	CGI/AI
Il Baracchino	1	6	Italy	2025	Amazon Prime Video	CGI/Stop-motion
Iron Man and His Awesome Friends	1	37	United States; Canada	2025–present	Disney Jr.	CGI
It's Andrew	1	40	Australia; Canada	2025	ABC Kids; CBC Kids	CGI
Iyanu: Child of Wonder	1	10	United States	2025–present	Cartoon Network; HBO Max	Traditional
Jiyo Gopuda	1	200	India	2025–present	Sony Aath	
Ki & Hi in the Panda Kingdom	1	52	France	2025	Canal+	Flash
Knights of Guinevere	1	1	Australia	2025–present	YouTube	Traditional
Koati	TBA	TBA	Mexico	2025	Netflix	Flash
Kurukshetra	1	18	India	2025	Netflix	CGI
Lil Kev	1	10	United States	2025–present	BET+	Flash
Long Story Short	2	10	United States	2025–present	Netflix	Flash
Lord of the Mysteries	2	13	China	2025–present	Tencent Video	Traditional
Magic 5 The Animation	1	180	Indonesia	2025	MentariTV	CGI
Marvel Zombies	1	4	United States	2025	Disney+	CGI
Mermicorno: Starfall	2	26	Canada	2025	Max	Flash
Mickey Mouse Clubhouse+	2	40	United States	2025–present	Disney Jr. Disney+	CGI
The Mighty Nein	1	8	United States	2025	Amazon Prime Video	Traditional
Mr. Crocodile	1	39	France	2025	Nickelodeon	CGI
Mr. Men Little Miss Mini Adventures	2	24	United Kingdom; Italy	2025–present	YouTube	Flash
MrBeast Lab	1	10	United States	2025–present	YouTube	Traditional/Flash
My Brother the Monster	1	26	Mexico; Canada	2025–present	Once Niñas y Niños	Flash/Traditional
Not a Box	1	8	United States	2025–present	Apple TV+	Flash
Oh My God... Yes! A Series of Extremely Relatable Circumstances	1	7	United States	2025–present	Adult Swim	Flash
Olly	1	7	United States	2025–present	BabyTV	CGI
Paris & Pups	1	4	United States	2025	YouTube	CGI
Piggy Builders	1	26	France	2025–present	France 5	CGI
Piñata Smashlings	1	52	Canada	2025–present	YTV	Flash
Piripenguins	1	26	United Kingdom	2025–present	CBeebies	Flash
Polly Can Do	TBA	TBA	Canada	2025	TVOKids	Flash
Reborn as a Cat	1	36	China	2025	Bilibili	Traditional/CGI
Roberta quiere cacao	1	TBA	Colombia	2025–present	Caracol Televisión	CGI
RoboGobo	2	50	United States; Ireland	2025–present	Disney Jr.	CGI
Rockolandia	1	10	Puerto Rico	2025	TeleOnce	Flash
The Sisters Grimm	2	12	United States	2025–present	Apple TV+	Flash
Skillsville	1	30	United States	2025–26	PBS Kids	Flash
Skivolo's World	1	14	United States	2025–present	YouTube	CGI
Stan & Gran	1	52	United Kingdom	2025	Milkshake!	CGI
Stan Can	1	52	United Kingdom	2025	CBeebies	Flash
StuGo	1	20	United States	2025	Disney Channel	Flash
Super Duper Bunny League	2	26	Finland; United States	2025	Nickelodeon	Flash
Super Team Canada	1	10	Canada	2025–present	Crave	Flash
Tale of the Nine Tailed Tiger: The Beginning of a Lotus	1	1	South Korea	2025	KBS 1	Traditional
Talking Tom Heroes: Suddenly Super			United Kingdom	2025	CBeebies	CGI
Team Mekbots Animal Rescue	1	13	United States	2025–present	Peacock	CGI
Ten Little... Who?	2	26	United Kingdom	2025–present	Sky Kids	Flash
Tim Rex in Space	2	TBA	United Kingdom	2025–present	Milkshake! Nickelodeon	Flash
Timbalo	1	10	Belgium	2025–present	Ketnet Junior	CGI
Tish Tash Singalong Series	1	13	South Korea	2025–present	EBS	CGI
To Be Hero X			China	2025		Traditional/CGI
Toopy and Binoo: Fabulous Adventures	1	13	Canada	2025–present	CBC	Flash
Transformers: Cyberworld	1	36	United States; United Kingdom; Singapore; Malaysia	2025	YouTube	CGI
Tuktu	1		Canada	2025–present	APTN	Flash
Underdog and the Canine Defenders	1		France; Spain	2025–present	M6; Gulli	CGI
The Weasy Family	1	78	France	2025	Télé-Québec	CGI
Weather Hunters	1	13	United States	2025–present	PBS Kids	CGI
Win or Lose	1	8	United States	2025	Disney+	CGI
Winx Club: The Magic Is Back	1	13	Italy	2025	Rai 2	CGI
Wolf King	2	16	United Kingdom	2025	Netflix	CGI
Women Wearing Shoulder Pads	1	8	Mexico	2025	Adult Swim	Stop-motion
Wonderblocks	1	30	United Kingdom	2025–present	CBeebies	CGI
The Wonderfully Weird World of Gumball	2	40	United Kingdom; United States; Germany; France	2025–present	Hulu	Flash; Traditional; CGI; Stop motion Live action
Woolly Woolly	1	14	Canada	2025	TVOKids	Stop-motion
Wylde Pak	2	26	United States	2025–present	Nickelodeon	Toon Boom Harmony
Your Friendly Neighborhood Spider-Man	2	10	United States	2025–present	Disney+	CGI/Traditional

== See also ==
- 2025 in animation
- 2025 in anime
- List of animated feature films of 2025
