= Manny Stul =

Australian billionaire

- Born: 1948 or 1949 (age 77–78) near Munich, Germany
- Occupations: Businessman; entrepreneur
- Known for: Moose Toys
- Spouse: Jacqui Tobias
- Children: 2

Manny Stul (born 1948/49) is an Australian billionaire, and the CEO of Moose Toys, a company he took over in 2000, with sales subsequently increased by over 7,000%.

== Background and career ==
Manny Stul was born in a refugee camp near Munich, Germany, to Polish-Jewish parents who were both Holocaust survivors, and had fled Poland in 1949 due to Communist rule. Aged seven months he travelled with his family by sea to Australia, where they spent three years in a refugee camp in Northam, Western Australia, before moving to Perth, some 100 kilometres (62 mi) south.

At the age of fifteen, Stul won a scholarship to an advanced school, although he later had the funding pulled. He subsequently dropped out of school.

Moose Toys is best known for its Shopkins and Mighty Beanz collectible plastic toys, which take inspiration from everyday grocery and department store items. In 2016, Stul became the first Australian to win the Ernst & Young World Entrepreneur Of The Year, at the age of 67, having already won EY's Australian Entrepreneur of the Year.

== Personal life ==
Stul lives in Melbourne with his wife Jacqui Tobias; and has a step-son, Paul Solomon, who is his co-CEO.

=== Net worth ===
Year	Financial Review Rich List		Forbes Australia's 50 Richest	
Year	Rank	Net worth (A$)	Rank	Net worth (US$)
2017			27 ▲	$1.40 billion ▲
2018	40	$1.73 billion ▲		
2019	51 ▼	$1.60 billion ▼	33 ▼	$1.30 billion ▼
2020	119 ▼	$0.835 billion ▼		$1.20 billion ▼
2021	69 ▲	$1.60 billion ▲		
2022	60 ▲	$2.00 billion ▲		
2023	66 ▼	$2.00 billion		
2024		$2.00 billion		
2025	48 ▲	$3.21 billion ▲		

Legend
Icon	Description
Steady	Has not changed from the previous year
▲	Has increased from the previous year
▼	Has decreased from the previous year
