= Fenati =

Fenati is an Italian surname. Notable people with the surname include:

- Massimo Fenati (born 1969), Italian comic book artist, illustrator, and animator
- Romano Fenati (born 1996), Italian motorcycle racer
