= Trash Pack =

Collectible toy brand

The Trash Pack
- Type: Collectible figurines
- Company: Moose Toys
- Country: Australia
- Availability: 2011–2014
- Materials: Rubber

The Trash Pack was a brand of collectible toys produced by Moose Toys, first launched in 2011. The toys were released in series, all with their own specific themes, and there are seven series in all. Along with the individual toys, the line also includes other merchandise, such as video games, activity books and sticker albums. A Trash Pack magazine has also been released through PONY Magazine.

The Trash Pack was originally developed as a successor to Moose's previous toy line Mighty Beanz. In 2016, a spin-off of The Trash Pack was released, titled The Grossery Gang.

== Description ==
The individual toys are called "Trashies" and are typically made of rubber. Each comes in a container shaped like a trash can, the color and size of which can change depending on the series. Limited and special edition Trashies are frequently composed of non-rubber materials. Each Trashie will have a certain name and various toys will have specific attributes, such as the ability to glow in the dark or change colors. Particularly rare Trashies have been known to sell for as much as £1,296.

== Availability ==
The Trash Pack was available globally, primarily in North America, Europe and Oceania. Outside of the United States and Australia, companies would distribute the brand to every other region. In Canada, Imports Dragon distributed The Trash Pack throughout the country. In Europe, Italian toy company Giochi Preziosi distributed them throughout many European countries.

== Game ==
=== Nintendo ===
In 2012, a Nintendo game entitled The Trash Pack was developed by Webfoot Technologies in partnership with Moose Enterprises. It was released for the Nintendo DS and 3DS on October 30, 2012 and allows players to collect Trashies and play four mini-games. Critical reception for the game was poor.

=== App ===
On May 31, 2014, the mobile app The Trash Pack Dash was released for Android and iOS operating systems. It was developed by Bulls I Toys.

== Ending, retirement and revival ==
In late 2014, the last series of the Trash Pack, which was Series 7 (a.k.a. Junk Germs), was released. An 8th series did not come out in 2015, which confused many fans. At the time, Moose Toys was releasing other collectibles, such as Shopkins and the Ugglys Pet Shop. After a few months, rumors were going around saying that the Trash Pack toy line was ending. Moose Toys finally confirmed that Series 7 was the last series in the summer of 2015.

The toy line was eventually revived as The Grossery Gang, a spin-off of the Trash Pack, in the summer of 2016. This toy line ran for 5 series (with a 6th one conceptualized) before ending in 2018.
