= Dolphin Boy =

- Directed by: Mohammad Kheirandish
- Written by: Mohammad Kheirandish
- Produced by: Mohammad Hamedani
- Production companies: SkyFrame Studio; Owj Arts and Media Organization; Saeno Production; Central Partnership
- Distributed by: Central Partnership (Russia); Lionsgate (North America)
- Release date: April 7, 2022
- Running time: 85 minutes
- Countries: Russia; Germany; Turkey; Iran
- Languages: Russian; Turkish; Persian; English

Dolphin Boy (Persian: پسر دلفینی) (also known, as Sea Level 3 in North America) is an animated fantasy-adventure feature film, produced in 2022 by Owj Arts and Media Organization. The film was both directed and written by Mohammad Kheirandish, with production led by Mohammad Amin Hamedani. The film premiered in Russia on April, 7 2022.

The film has spawned a television series, released in March 2024 on Filmo, and a sequel film, Dolphin Boy 2, released in 2025.

== Distribution ==
It was initially released in Russia, where it grossed about $1.8 million. The film debuted in Iranian cinemas on August 24, 2022.

Dolphin Boy has been released in 30 countries globally to date. Among the nations where this animation has been screened in theaters are Canada, Russia, Turkey, Spain, the United States, Italy, Portugal, Saudi Arabia, and Germany. Platforms such as Netflix, Apple TV, and Amazon have played a role in the international distribution of the film.

== Plot ==
Dolphin Boy narrates the tale of an infant who was nurtured by a dolphin in the ocean. Following a plane crash into the water, a young dolphin named Sefid and his mother discover a human baby and decide to care for him. The boy grows up and after realizing that he is a human, he goes to land to find his mother. Throughout this quest, Captain Morvarid, his wife, and the entire port community extend their assistance. Nevertheless, the underwater realm is overtaken by octopuse, compelling Dolphin Boy to confront new obstacles.

== Production ==
Writer and director: Mohammad Kheirandish, producer: Mohammad Hamedani, art director: Mehdi Farsi, technical director: Mostafa Shahmardani, production manager: Alireza Esmaeili, Davoud Asadollahi, rendering and compositing supervisor: Saeed Garmabadari, special effects supervisor: Reza Ghorbani, animation supervisor: Jalal Rahbari, composer: Behzad Abdi, project manager: Aseman Khial.

== Television series ==
In March 2024, a series consisting of 26 episodes, sharing the same title, premiered on Filimo. The direction was handled by Reza Fasahet, with character design by Mohammad Kheirandish, and production led by Mohammad Hamedani.

=== Premise ===
The dolphin boy serves as the protector of the ocean and is tasked with safeguarding the marine life. Meanwhile, the threat still looms over the sea, as the malevolent octopus, confined in a crevice, is devising and executing new schemes against the marine creatures with the assistance of Shami. The boy must harness his intellect and instincts to defend the ocean, enlisting the support of other sea inhabitants.

=== Production ===
Writer: Mona Abdollahshahi, Character Designer: Mohammad Kheirandish, Animation Supervisors: Morteza Yari, Saeed Begnah, Composite Supervisors: Mehdi Mirzaei, Erfan Jalalavandi, Saeed Garmabadari, Special Effects Supervisor: Sina Taghizadeh, Narrator Supervisor: Hamed Azizi.

== Sequel film ==
A sequel film, Dolphin Boy 2, was released in 2025. It was directed by Mohammad Kheirandish and penned by Mohammad Shokohi. Dolphin Boy 2 was presented at the 43rd Fajr Film Festival on February 5, 2025, where it received the Crystal Simorgh for Best Animation as well as the Crystal Simorgh for Best Film as voted by the Audience.

=== Plot ===
Dolphin Boy has emerged as a celebrated figure and hero among both the sea creatures and the island's inhabitants. He starts to assume the role of a hero with assistance from the captain, the white, and a shark. On the opposing side of the narrative, Khajeh Majed, who has been stripped of all his riches, is driven by a desire for vengeance against the captain, the dolphin boy, and the inhabitants of the island, harboring dark intentions. To locate a hidden island, Khajeh Majed persuades the captain Morvarid to lend him his barge, leading to the unfolding of the story and the events that follow the introduction of the dolphin boy's adventure.

=== Production ===
Produced by Mohammad Amin Hamedani, directed by Mohammad Kheirandish and voice actors: Nahid Amirian, Hamed Azizi, Maryam Jalini, Soraya Ghasemi, Sharara Hazrati, Arsalan Jouliei, Georges Petrousi, Touraj Nasr.

== See also ==
- List of animated feature films of 2025
- Owj Arts and Media Organization
- Battle of Persian Gulf II
- Princess of Rome
