= Moose Toys =

Australian-owned toy company

Moose Enterprises Pty. Ltd.
- Trade name: Moose Toys
- Type: Private
- Industry: Entertainment
- Founded: 1985; 41 years ago
- Founder: Brian Hamersfeld
- Headquarters: Cheltenham, Melbourne, Australia
- Area served: Worldwide
- Key people: Paul Solomon; Manny Stul (chief executive); Jacqui Tobias (Director of Girl's Products)
- Products: Shopkins; Trash Pack; Mighty Beanz; MrBeast Lab
- Revenue: $1.3 billion
- Number of employees: 700+
- Website: moosetoys.com

Moose Toys, also known as Moose Enterprises or The Moose Group, is an Australian-owned toy design, development, and distribution company founded in 1985 by Brian Hamersfeld. The company is headquartered Cheltenham, Victoria, Australia, has over 700 staff and distributes to over 80 countries. They are best known for their collectible mini-figure toy lines, including Mighty Beanz, Trash Pack, and Shopkins.

== History ==
In 1985, Moose Toys was founded by Brian Hamersfeld. In 2001, Moose was acquired by Chief Executives Manny Stul, Jacqui Tobias, and Paul Solomon. In 2002, Moose released a line of collectible toys called Mighty Beanz, which became Moose's first toy line to achieve international success. Moose released the first wave of Mighty Beanz from 2002 to 2006, and later relaunched the Mighty Beanz brand in 2010.

In 2011, Paul Solomon began an effort to distribute Moose Toys products directly into US retail, ending its distributor license with Canadian toy company Spin Master. The move allowed for greater profit to be made after the successful launch of the collectible minifigure toy line called "Trash Pack" in the same year. Three years later in 2014, Moose Toys launched the Shopkins toy line, which later grew into a franchise in later years with spin-offs and other merchandise, accompanied by a change in main office to their current location in Cheltenham, and a change in logo design. These two successful ventures helped Moose Toys revenue from the 2000s to 2015 grow from $10 million to more than $900 million.

In 2015, at the 15th annual Toy Industry Association's Toy of the Year (TOTY) Awards ceremony, Moose Toys' Shopkins Small Mart was awarded the '2015 Girl Toy of the Year'. In 2016, Moose was recognized as Toy Vendor of the year in the US by Toys R Us, Target, and Walmart, CEO Manny Stul also won the EY World Entrepreneur Year Award, and was the first Australian to do so. Shopkins also won the girl toy of the year award at the 16th annual Toy Industry Association's Toy of the Year Awards for the second time. In 2017, Manny Stul was inducted into the Australian Toy Industry Hall of Fame.

In 2018, Moose Toys acquired Worlds Apart as part of a European expansion, followed by the company entering the preschool toy line with "Kindi Kids", a Shopkins spin-off which features the popular Shoppies line of dolls as preschoolers, the following year. In 2021, Moose Toys was awarded with five wins at the Australian Toy Awards. Moose also expanded into the Canadian market with the launch of a hybrid direct distribution model for a strategic selection of new brands, including Akedo and Bluey. In 2023, Moose Toys took home four awards at the Australian Toy Awards. In 2024, Moose Toys began focusing on partnerships, signing at licensing deal with YouTuber MrBeast to make a toy line called MrBeast Lab, and one with Glitch Productions to make a toy line for their web series The Amazing Digital Circus. The company currently has over 600 staff, distributes to over 50 countries, and makes around $1 billion in revenue.

== Toy lines ==
Moose Toys has also created, manufactured, and marketed toy brands across a number of categories: including action figure, plush, and dolls. Most have a collectible component and include a number of other products within the toy line.

=== Shopkins ===
Shopkins are a collectible line of figures based on earlier The Trash Pack figures. The toys are miniature store item characters, with each Shopkins character given a name, hobby, hang out, and BFF, intended to create an emotional bond for the collector.

Originally released in June 2014, by December 2015 over 115 million Shopkins had been sold worldwide. Due to the toy line's popularity, it expanded into a franchise including licensed merchandise and spin-offs for the toy line (notably the Shopkins Shoppies line of dolls, Happy Places in which people can decorate homes with Petkins furniture, Cutie Cars which are miniature Shopkins cars, Lil' Secrets, a line similar to Polly Pocket, and Kindi Kids, a Shoppies-spin-off doll line for preschoolers). Paul Solomon credits his mother Jacqui Tobias, director of girls' products, for the idea of Shopkins. In December 2015, a one-of-kind glass Shopkin called Gemma Stone sold for $21,500 on eBay, with all proceeds going to the Toy Industry Foundation.

== Games ==
In 2024, Moose Toys began selling Pickleball Blast, a table-top game inspired by the sport of pickleball. The two-player children's game requires players to use a hand-held mechanical paddle to hit a plastic pickle back and forth over the net while trying to flip the lid on the opponent's pickle jars.

== Animation ==
In 2014, Moose partnered with Pixel Zoo to create Shopkins animated content, including the webisodes. For the launch of Shopkins, a series of animated Webisodes were created for the ShopkinsWorld YouTube channel (now MooseTube Squad). There have been 85 released, along with 6 original music video clips, and has gained millions of views. WildBrain distributes Shopkins content on their channels (including the WildBrain - Cutie Cartoons channel) and, in 2016, has also been placed on Netflix amongst many other territorial stations globally. Moose also partnered with Universal Studios to create three Shopkins movies. In 2019, Moose also released a spin-off line of Shopkins intended for preschoolers, Kindi Kids, which was supported by a CGI animated series. In 2021, to promote the toys for Season 5, the brand was supported by a new-look 2D animated series for the series' 4th season.

For their Trash Pack toy line, Moose also created Trash Pack cartoons which ended shortly near the end of the toy franchise in 2014. In 2016, to promote The Trash Pack's sequel, The Grossery Gang, Moose has done Grossery Gang cartoons which continue to amass views on YouTube. This content includes three mini movies and more than 35 webisodes. The first Grossery Gang animated mini movie was released on 28 July 2017 on YouTube to promote Series 3 of the toy franchise.

In 2018, Moose released a digital-first series to support the launch of Treasure X, a 2D series which continued for three years on YouTube. In 2019, Moose launched more animated content for their Goo Jit Zu toy line, which gained over 120 million views on the five mini movies that have followed by November 2021. The content has since also been placed on Netflix in English, French, and German, amongst other distribution platforms. In 2021, Moose announced their partnership with WildBrain on the brand Akedo. This digital-first series launched in June 2021 and is part of a larger partnership between Moose, Wildbrain, and Consumer Products (CPLG). This series was brought to YouTube and Amazon Prime initially in both English and French, with wider distribution to come on additional platforms and in Portuguese, Italian, Spanish, and Russian in 2022.

== Licensed Partnerships ==
=== Shopkins ===
Moose has licensed Shopkins for additional products through Bulldog Licensing in the UK, The Licensing Shop in the US, and Merchantwise in Australia.

As of January 2016, 51 Shopkins licencees had been signed in North America, including apparel, construction, candy, games, and bedding. In that same month, Shopkins partnered with McDonald's to release special edition Happy Meal toys.

=== Bluey ===
On June 12, 2019, Moose Toys was named "Global Toy Master" (excluding Asia) for the Australian preschool series, Bluey. Toys based on the show were released in November 2019 in Australia and July (Target) and August (Walmart and Amazon) in 2020 in the U.S.A.

=== Others ===
Moose Toys has entered into a licensed partnership with Fortnite in 2018 to create themed collectable toys and merchandise. In 2021, a toy line partnership was also made with Warner Bros. for the film Tom & Jerry and Space Jam: A New Legacy. Also in 2021, a partnership was made with Silvergate Media to release a toy line to promote the Octonauts spin-off "Octonauts: Above & Beyond". In September 2021, WildBrain named Moose the new toy partner for the relaunched Strawberry Shortcake franchise, with new toys being released in early 2022. Moose Toys more recently has partnered with YouTubers, including ChuChu TV, Collins Key, Glitch Productions, and most notably MrBeast to create MrBeast Lab.

== Recent Awards ==
- 2023 Australian Toy Awards: Doll Product of the Year – Magic Mixies Castle Play Set
- 2023 Australian Toy Awards: Australian Development Product of the Year - Little Live Pets Mama Surprise
- 2023 Australian Toy Awards: Judges Choice Award – Cookeez Makery
- 2023 Australian Toy Awards: Electronic Product of the Year – Magic Mixies Crystal Ball
- 2022 Mastermind Toys Most Innovative Toy: Magic Mixies Crystal Ball
- 2022 Big W Innovation of the Year: Magic Mixies Crystal Ball
- 2022 UK Dream Toys List: Little Live Pets Mama Surprise
- 2022 UK Dream Toys List: Magic Mixies Mixlings Castle Playset
- 2022 UK Dream Toys List: Heroes of Goo Jit Zu Shifters Hero Pack
- 2022 TOTY (American Toy Association): Creative Toy of the Year: Magic Mixies Crystal Ball
- 2022 PureWow Happy Kids Best Toy Kids Aged 4-7: Magic Mixies Mixlings Magic Castle Playset
- 2022 Toy Designer of the Year Award at the Mojo Nation Play Creator Awards for Magic Mixies
- 2022 Best Licensed Toys or Games Range for Bluey at the British Licensing Awards
- 2022 Grand Prix du Jouet: Akedo: Triple Tag Arena
- 2022 Grand Prix du Jouet: Little Live Pets: Mama Surprise
- 2022 TOTY: Creative Toy of the Year: Magic Mixies
- 2022 ATA Australian Toy of the Year Award: Magic Mixies
- 2022 ATA Development Toy of the Year: Treasure X
- 2022 ATA Action Toy of the Year: Treasure X
- 2022 ATA Craft & Activity Toy of the Year: Blingle Bands
- 2022 ATA Electronic Toy of the Year: Magic Mixies
- 2022 ATA Plush Toy of the Year: Scruff-A-Luvs
- 2021 UK Toy Industry Interactive Toy of the Year: Magic Mixies
- 2021 UK Toy Industry Action Toy of the Year: Real Littles
- 2021 French Grand Prix du Jouet Toy of the Year: Magic Mixies
- 2021 French Grand Prix du Jouet Magic Toys: Magic Mixies
- 2021 French Grand Prix du Jouet Electronic Toys (Friends): Little Live Pets
- 2021 French Grand Prix du Jouet Fighting Game Toys: Akedo
- 2021 Global Toy of the Year – Spanish Association of Toy Manufacturers: Magic Mixies
- 2021 Electronic Toy of the Year – Spanish Association of Toy Manufacturers: Magic Mixies
- 2021 ATA Judges Choice Award: Bluey Pool Time Playset
- 2021 ATA Australian Development Product of The Year: Treasure X Aliens -Ultimate Dissection
- 2021 ATA Action Product of the Year: Treasure X Sunken Treasure Ship
- 2021 ATA Craft & Activity Product of the year: JelliRez StyleMi Assortment
- 2021 ATA Plush Product of the Year: Bluey & Friends Basic Plush
- 2020 Walmart Toy Supplier of the Year
- 2020 ATA Australian Development Product of the Year: Treasure X Kings Gold: Treasure Tomb
- 2020 ATA Collectable of the Year: Shopkins Lil' Shopper Pack, Australian Toy Awards
- 2020 London Toy Fair Hero Toy of the Fair: Kindi Kids
- 2020 London Toy Fair Action Figure of the Year: Heroes of Goo Jit Zu
- 2019 ATA Action figure of the Year: Treasure X Aliens
- 2019 TOTY: Plush Toy of the Year: Scruff A Luvs
- 2019 London Toy Fair Plush Toy of the year, Scruff A Luvs: London Toy Fair
