= Dolphin Boy 2 =

- Official poster of the animation
- Directed by: Mohammad Kheirandish
- Screenplay by: Mohammad Kheirandish; Mohammad Shokouhi
- Produced by: Mohammad Hamdani
- Starring: Nahid Amirian; Hamed Azizi; Maryam Jalini; Sorayya Qasemi; Sharareh Hazrati; Arsalan Joulai; Georges Petrocy; Touraj Nasr; Javad Pezeshkian
- Music by: Hooman Namdari
- Production company: Skyframe Animation
- Distributed by: Owj Arts and Media Organization
- Release dates: 6 February 2025 (43rd Fajr Film Festival); 21 February 2025 (Iran)
- Running time: 96 minutes
- Country: Iran
- Language: Persian
- Budget: 15 million tomans
- Box office: 31 million tomans

Dolphin Boy 2 (Persian: پسر دلفینی ۲) is a 2025 Iranian animated film directed by Mohammad Kheirandish, who co-wrote the screenplay with Mohammad Shokouhi. The film is a sequel to Dolphin Boy (2022) and features the voices of Nahid Amirian, Hamed Azizi, Maryam Jalini, Sorayya Qasemi, Sharareh Hazrati, Arsalan Joulai, Georges Petrocy, and Touraj Nasr. From 31 August 2025, the film has attracted over 468,000 viewers in Iran and grossed nearly 31 million tomans.

The film premiered on 6 February 2025 at the 43rd Fajr Film Festival and won the Crystal Simorgh for Best Animation and the Audience Choice Award. Like its predecessor, it also achieved significant international sales, being screened in countries such as Russia, Kazakhstan, Uzbekistan, and several European nations.

== Plot ==
The Dolphin Boy and his Brother have been battling sea monsters deceitfully, believing that people should not forget the hero of the sea. However, their journey takes a new turn when Majid discovers a message in a floating bottle revealing the location of a mysterious potion. Setting sail with the navigator's boat, they encounter a orca and send out a distress call for help. The dolphin boy and his companions embark on a perilous journey to rescue Majid from the clutches of the wild whale. Meanwhile, news arrives that signs of the dolphin boy's father have been found near Majid's location. Fueled by the desire to find traces of his parents and discover his human name, the Dolphin Boy sets off on a quest. Unexpectedly, their journey leads them to the discovery of the dolphin boy's father, who is the inventor of the mysterious potion, hidden in an underwater cave. Majid, who had initially sought to obtain the potion for himself, transforms into a gigantic crab after consuming it. With the help of their allies, including the navigator, his wife, his best friend Leila, and the islanders, the dolphin boy cames to rescue the day.

== Voice cast ==
- Voice director – Hamed Azizi
- Nahid Amirian as Dolphin Boy
- Hamed Azizi as Captain Morvarid
- Maryam Jalini as Sefid
- Sorayya Qasemi as Bibi Zar
- Sharareh Hazrati as Captain’s wife
- Arsalan Joulai as Captain Majid
- Georges Petrocy as the Scientist (Dolphin Boy’s father)
- Touraj Nasr as Hermit Crab
- Javad Pezeshkian as Turtle

== Production ==
The original Dolphin Boy was produced in 2020. Due to the COVID-19 pandemic, it was released in 2022 and became one of the highest-grossing films of the year, screening in 30 countries. A 26-episode TV series was also released on home media in March 2024. Following its success, in August 2024 director Mohammad Kheirandish announced that a sequel, Dolphin Boy 2, was in production with foreign investment.

Production manager Shahriar Shahramfar stated that the film took 18 months to complete. Hamed Azizi, the dubbing director, said that Nasser Taghvai’s film Captain Khorshid inspired part of the dubbing. The film was co-financed by Iranian and international companies, each contributing 50%.

On 21 January 2025, it was announced that post-production had been completed and the film would premiere at the 43rd Fajr Film Festival.

== Music ==
Producer Mohammad Amin Hamdani announced that Shervin Hajipour performed the film’s ending theme, which will be released officially during the 2025 Nowruz screenings after obtaining a license. In the Arab World, the soundtrack is sung by Lebanese singer Nancy Ajram.

== Release ==
Dolphin Boy 2 premiered on 6 February 2025 at the 43rd Fajr Film Festival and was theatrically released in Iran on 21 February 2025. According to the producer, compared to the first film, this sequel will have a wider international release in cinemas and on streaming platforms.
