= Gus & Waldo =

Gus & Waldo are a couple of fictional anthropomorphic gay penguins that share love for one another. They are the creation of Massimo Fenati, an Italian-born and London-based artist. Their stories lampoon many aspects of the human condition including popular culture, society, and the media

Since their debut in 2006, Gus and Waldo have appeared in three books published in the UK and all Commonwealth countries, with the first book of the series also translated and published in a number of non-English-speaking countries (Brazil, Finland, Germany, Austria, Switzerland and Italy). Merchandise is also available and a TV series is reportedly in development.

== The characters ==
Gus and Waldo are penguins of an unidentified subspecies. They look very similar, with only one difference to tell them apart: Gus has pointy beak and Waldo has a rounded one. This is symbolic of the slight difference in their characters: Gus is more nervous, sharper and prefers high-brow culture. Waldo is mellow, untidy and loves gossip and trash magazines. They live in a fictional metropolitan city, in a society formed by all sorts of anthropomorphic animals.

== The books ==
=== Gus & Waldo’s Book of Love ===
Gus & Waldo's Book of Love (Orion, 2006, hardback, 96 pages) is a picture book that deals with the love that Gus and Waldo share for one another.

Synopsis: Gus and Waldo love each other and they also love life and its many aspects: food, pastimes, shopping and a bed together. They have many personal tastes in common, but also divergent views on some issues. Their relationship experiences slight turbulence over such everyday foibles as bedtime snoring, divergent red and yellow tastes in sunglasses frames, extravagant shopping and other issues, which leads the couple to a chameleon relationship counsellor who informs them that ‘penguins mate for life’ (this is factually disputable, and depends on which penguin subspecies is being cited, as this is not the case with all them, but only with a few, such as the Humboldt penguin, the Macaroni penguin, the Rockhopper penguin and the Yellow-eyed penguin. Gus and Waldo's subspecies is not identified). The book ends happily as the loving birds decide that as ‘Fighting's Neither Fun Nor Clever/Gus and Waldo Love Each Other Forever!’ (As the book contains a two-page spread of the penguins in non-explicit fetish wear, it is probably not suitable for young children).

Foreign language editions: Finland: Gus & Waldo Sillä Siivellä (WSOY, 2007); Brazil: Gus & Waldo O Livro Do Amor (Ediouro, 2006); Germany/Austria/Switzerland: Gus & Waldos Buch Der Liebe (Hoffmann Und Campe, 2007); Italy: Il Libro Dell’Amore Di Gus & Waldo (TEA, 2008)

=== Gus & Waldo’s Book of Fame ===
Gus & Waldo’s Book of Fame (Orion, 2007, hardback, 96 pages) narrates the misadventures of Gus and Waldo in their search for fame, in a sarcastic take on modern society's obsession with the celebrity status, and explores what happens when we become separated from what is really important in life.

Synopsis: Although deeply in love with each other, Gus and Waldo explain their quest for stardom as being a desire for the 'whole world' to fall in love with them. After a few failed stabs at fame, Gus and Waldo publish their first book: Gus and Waldo's Book of Love, and it's a hit. They are suddenly on the covers of glossy magazines, owners of a Hollywood mansion and the ‘faces' of a variety of products (from toasters to skateboards). It seems Gus and Waldo have made it. But Fame is fickle and a cooler penguin, Cedric, takes the world by storm. Gus and Waldo are soon forgotten. In the end Gus and Waldo, now reclining in rehab, have a shared moment of revelation about the capacity of fame and fortune to deliver happiness and increase the amount of love in their lives. A gin-swigging peacock delivers a line worth remembering: ‘Get the whole world to love you? Why bother!?! You already love each other!’

In detailing what is required to maintain fame and fortune, this book manages to define what love is not. Many aspects of popular culture are satirized in this book, from TV talent shows to blockbuster films, from workout videos to brand endorsement.

=== Gus & Waldo’s Book of Sex ===
In the third volume of the series, Gus & Waldo’s Book of Sex (Orion, 2008, hardback, 96 pages), the penguins face a cooling phase in their sex life and through a series of trial-and-error experiments try to regain their passion for one another.

Synopsis: Gus and Waldo are suffering between the sheets and set out to rekindle the flame both in and out of the bedroom. They didn't just mate for life, they mated all the time, but will the routine of married life put their sex life on ice? They are willing to try anything and everything from pole dancing to Viagra, from role play to aphrodisiac food. The clumsy penguins ask all their friends for advice, but after many failed attempts, they take the leap and decide to open their relationship. But all the possible partners they eye up are wrong, and when they think they've found a good one in the dark room of a swinger's party, they realize they've in fact found each other. Clearly, they're destined to be a monogamous couple and with a huge relief they realize the whole problem was all in their minds: ‘Oh my love we were wrong, we were fine all along! It was so stupid to vex, our love could fill a book of sex!’

Gus & Waldo’s Book of Sex is a wry and witty look at our attitudes to our own sex lives and everybody else's. In a similar way as in their previous two books, by mocking all the fads, myths and paraphernalia that are often associated with today's approach to sex, Gus and Waldo expose the reality of all of this: all nice games, but not a substitute for love.

Foreign language editions: Italy: Il Libro Del Sesso Di Gus & Waldo (TEA, 2011)

=== Gus & Waldo Crazy in Love ===
The fourth title of the series (Orion, 2010, hardback, 192 pages) is a compendium of two previously published titles: Gus & Waldo’s Book of Fame and Gus & Waldo’s Book of Sex, with only a few previously unpublished illustrations to connect the plots of the two books into a single narrative.
