= Massimo Fenati =

Italian comic book artist, illustrator and animator

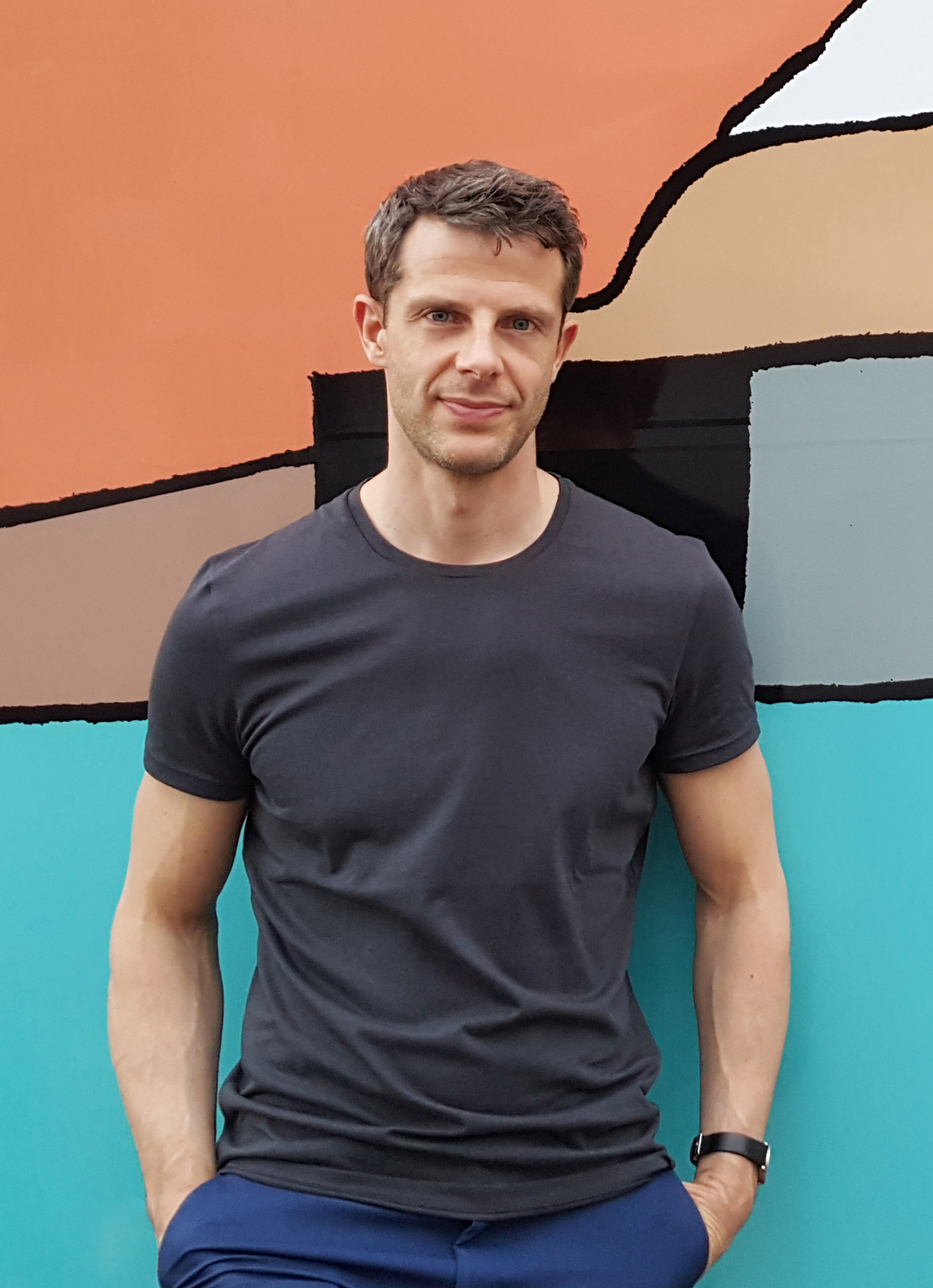
Massimo Fenati

Massimo Fenati (born: Genoa, Italy, 1969), is an Italian comic book artist, illustrator and director of animated films. He lives in London, UK, and is mostly known as the creator of the TV series Piripenguins.

== Biography ==
After obtaining an MA in architecture at the University of Genoa, Fenati moved to London in 1995 to work as a product designer, working at a number of design practices (Jasper Morrison, Pentagram and David Chipperfield Architects) before setting up his own studio in 2003. After a few years of work in the furniture and product design industry, his career as a cartoonist started in 2006 in when his first illustrated book (Gus & Waldo's Book Of Love) was published by Orion Books in the United Kingdom.

This was followed by three more volumes in the same series (Gus & Waldo's Book Of Fame, 2007; Gus & Waldo's Book Of Sex, 2008; Arte Pinguina, 2015). With the animated short films based on these books he won the audience awards at the IRIS Animation Film Festival in Rio de Janeiro, the Queersicht Film Festival in Berne and the Sub-Ti competition for short films at the 2009 Venice Film Festival.

In 2011 Fenati published 101 Uses For A Dead Meerkat (Boxtree Ltd.), a book of cartoons, which was later translated and published also in Italy with Arnoldo Mondadori Editore in 2013.

Fenati collaborated with British TV production companies such as Tiger Aspect Productions, Endemol and Maverick, and produced motion graphics for programmes for BBC, Channel 4, and Sky, such as Embarrassing Bodies, Stephen Fry Gadget Man, Dispatches and Ripper Street.

In 2012 and 2013 he collaborated with Il Fatto Quotidiano newspaper and published a comic for children titled Cico & Toto on the Monday edition of the paper.

He created the image for the 2011 edition of the TGLFF (Torino Gay and Lesbian Film Festival), and in 2013 he was appointed as curator of the new animation section at the same festival. Between 2014 and 2019 he collaborated with Corriere della Sera newspaper, regularly posting a comic strip about food on the paper's website, titled La Cucina A Fumetti (The Cartoon Kitchen).

His latest book is the graphic novel La Mennulara (The Almond Picker), published by Feltrinelli Comics in 2018 and based on the eponymous best-seller by Simonetta Agnello Hornby.

In 2020 he started his work as director in the field of children animation with Eagle Eye Drama, a British production company. His first foray in that field was Clown, the adaptation of the eponymous book by the British iconic illustrator Sir Quentin Blake, which was narrated by Helena Bonham Carter and shown on Channel 4 on Christmas Day 2020. That first Christmas special lead to the commission of a second one in 2021, this time the adaptation of a short story by Terry Pratchett: The Abominable Snow Baby, which Fenati wrote, directed and for which he designed all characters and overall style. Julie Walters, David Harewood and Hugh Dancy gave voice to the main characters in the show. The good success of the first collaboration with Quentin Blake also resulted in a new commission for the BBC: Quentin Blake's Box of Treasures, an anthology series of 6 half-hour animated films, each based on a Quentin Blake book. Fenati is the co-writer and series director of this series, whose episodes aired on BBC One at various times between 2023 and 2025. Voices for the protagonists of these short films were provided by Adrian Lester, Simon Pegg, Alison Steadman and Nina Sosanya. The series has had multiple nominations and won a number of international awards, amongst which the Royal Television Society award for Best Children's Programme in 2025.

His most well-known creation is Piripenguins, a 52-episode quarter-hour animated series for children, which launched on CBeebies in May 2025.

Fenati's animation company Eaglet has been awarded Studio of the Year at the Cartoons on the Bay festival in 2025.

== Bibliography ==
- Fenati, Massimo (2006). Gus & Waldo's Book of Love. Orion Books. ISBN 978-0-7528-7565-1. Archived from the original on 27 July 2014.
- Fenati, Massimo (2007). Gus & Waldo's Book of Fame. Orion Books. ISBN 978-0-7528-9015-9.
- Fenati, Massimo (2008). Il Libro dell'Amore di Gus & Waldo. TEA. ISBN 9788850217687.
- Fenati, Massimo (2008). Gus & Waldo's Book of Sex. Orion Books. ISBN 978-0-7528-9846-9. Archived from the original on 27 July 2014.
- Fenati, Massimo (2010). Gus & Waldo Crazy In Love. Orion Books. ISBN 978-1-4091-3106-9. Archived from the original on 27 July 2014.
- Fenati, Massimo (2011). Il Libro del Sesso di Gus & Waldo. TEA. ISBN 9788850225781.
- Fenati, Massimo (2011). 101 Uses For A Dead Meerkat. Boxtree. ISBN 978-0752227924. Archived from the original on 26 July 2014.
- Fenati, Massimo (2013). L'Insospettabile Utilità di un Suricato Morto. Mondadori. ISBN 9788804634096. Archived from the original on 25 July 2014.
- Fenati, Massimo (2015). Arte Pinguina. TEA. ISBN 9788850241583.
- Fenati, Massimo (2018). La Mennulara. Feltrinelli Comics. ISBN 9788807550126.

== Websites ==
Main website:

- http://www.massimofenati.com

Character-specific websites:

- https://piripenguins.com/
