= Battle of Persian Gulf II =

The Second Battle of the Persian Gulf
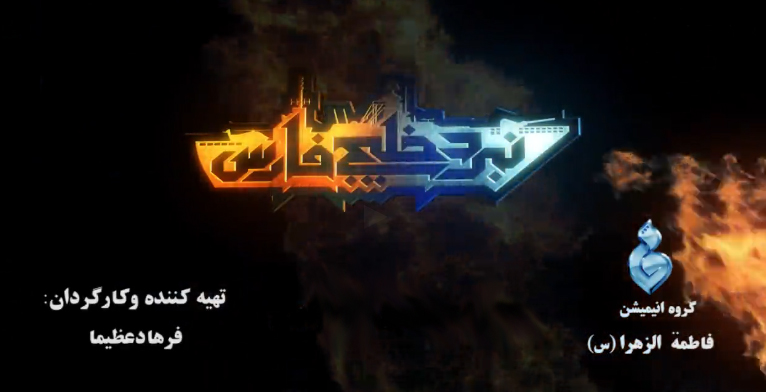
- Directed by: Farhad Azima
- Story by: Farhad Azima
- Produced by: Farhad Azima
- Production company: Fatima Zahra Animation Studios; -kosar3d.com
- Release date: February 18, 2017 (Iran)
- Running time: 80 minutes
- Country: Iran
- Language: Persian

The Second Persian Gulf Battle II is a 2017 Iranian computer animated epic war film directed by Farhad Azima. The content of the animation is focused on a visionary prospective war between U.S. Navy and Iranian Revolutionary Guard in Persian Gulf.

The lead of the film, Commander Qasem, is a reference to Qasem Soleimani, according to Farhad Azima. Farhad Azima has declared in an interview that the animation can be a response to the recent elected president of United States, Donald Trump: "I hope that the film shows Trump how American soldiers will face a humiliating defeat if they attack Iran," Azima said. "They all sink and the film ends as the American ships have turned into an aquarium for fishes at the bottom of the sea." This animation is released shortly after Trump put Iran "on notice".

According to the director Azima, it took more than four years to make the animation and the total production cost was 10 billion rials ($308,000).
