= MrBeast Lab =

Toy line of collectable minifigures

- Type: Collectable minifigures
- Invented by: Jimmy Donaldson (MrBeast)
- Company: Moose Toys
- Availability: July 25, 2024–present
- Features: MrBeast icon
- Official website

MrBeast Lab is a toy line of collectable minifigures created by YouTuber Jimmy Donaldson, better known as MrBeast. After partnering in January 2024, the minifigures are produced by the Australian toy manufacturer Moose Toys.

The toys, many of which resembling the MrBeast channel icon, launched to the public during San Diego Comic-Con on July 25, 2024, and became one of the largest brand activations in the event's history. Despite this, the product's launch was not announced on any of Donaldson's social media platforms for a number of days following, unlike Donaldson's sweets company Feastables had done one year prior. The unusually quiet launch was attributed to a number of allegations against Donaldson and long-time channel collaborators including Ava Kris Tyson, which had surfaced right before the product's scheduled release. Because of these allegations, the launch was negatively reported on by a number of news agencies.

Some months after many of the controversies surrounding MrBeast had passed, the toy line began to become more popular, and began to receive its first positive reviews by a number of publications; including the American lifestyle magazine Good Housekeeping and the Canadian bi-monthly magazine Today's Parent before the Christmas season. Further successes, including winning two awards at the Circana Global Toy Industry Performance Awards and briefly topping Amazon's toy sales in February 2025, led to a partnership with Stoopid Buddy Stoodios being organized to produce an animated web series about the toys, which premiered in the fall of 2025.

== History ==
=== Development and release ===
On January 25, 2024, the Australian toy manufacturer Moose Toys announced it had partnered with American YouTuber and philanthropist Jimmy Donaldson, known online as MrBeast, to create a toy line. Shortly after the announcement, both the CEO of Moose Toys, Paul Solomon, and Donaldson released statements supporting the partnership. On July 19, 2024, the final "MrBeast Lab" product debuted to the public via a YouTube video on the Moose Toys channel. This debut took place shortly before the product became available for purchase, which began within the month in the U.S., and later during the fall internationally.

The product first appeared for purchase at San Diego Comic-Con from July 25 to 28 in a pop-up toy store in the shape of an overturned tanker truck carrying toxic waste. The event was the first time Moose Toys had ever made an appearance at Comic-Con, and was one of the largest brand activations ever seen at Comic-Con. Despite this, the timing was regarded as especially odd by a number of news agencies. Just before, allegations that long-time channel collaborator Ava Kris Tyson had inappropriately interacted with and groomed minors surfaced, alongside allegations about other channel collaborators, and claims that Donaldson faked his videos, mistreated employees, and created a toxic working environment. The resulting scrutiny led to an unusually quiet launch of the new toy line, with no mention of its debut on Donaldson's YouTube channel, Instagram, X, or other social media platforms, much unlike his earlier launch of Feastables. The launch was possibly forced at the time it was due to a marketing agreement, as the toy line appeared to have been in the works for over a year by the time of launch.

On August 17, 2024, Donaldson released his first video since the allegations against him and his team surfaced, titled "7 Days Stranded In A Cave", in which he made no mention or denied any of the allegations, but instead advertised the toy line for the first time on his main account, not satisfying a number of his viewers.

=== Recent history ===
Despite the negative press, the Missouri radio station KICK-FM, the American family magazine Reader's Digest, American lifestyle magazine Good Housekeeping rated the toy a "must-have" on their top Christmas gift idea lists in October 2024, and the Canadian bi-monthly magazine Today's Parent rated it one of the most trending toys of 2024. At the 2024 Circana Global Toy Industry Performance Awards, the Beast Lab Creator Assortment won first in the category Canada's Top Selling Toy by Action Figures and Accessories, and in Europe's Top Gaining Toy Property by Action Figures and Accessories. On October 17, 2024, a limited edition of the mutator toy was sold at Walmart's final "Collector Con" of the year. In the first three months of 2025, it was announced the product was becoming available for purchase in Mexico.

Following the conclusion of MrBeast's reality competition television series Beast Games in February 2025, a new line of "Micro Beast" toys part of the "swarms" series topped Amazon's toy charts, with over one thousand sets being sold in a week. In the same month, an animated series of shorts revolving around the toys was announced to debut in the fall. The series was being produced in collaboration with Stoopid Buddy Stoodios, with Matthew Senreich as the executive producer and Sam Levine as the showrunner. It is set to feature the toys using technology from the lab to battle against The Shroud, a "shadowy sinister force from another dimension".

== Description ==
The toy line primarily consists of small-scale collectable minifigures called "swarms" which stand at 1 in (25 mm) tall. The minifigures, which come packaged in a plastic test tube, are accessed by first adding water to the test tube, shaking, and then removing the minifigures from the fizz in the test tube. "Mutators" function similarly, with the difference being they are located in a plastic chamber rather than a test tube, and that the chemical reaction in the chamber actually colors the toy instead of just producing fizz. Other products in the toy line include "vinyl figures", which are stylized off of the MrBeast channel logo, and "collector figures", which are 6 in (150 mm) tall and also stylized off of the MrBeast channel logo. A limited number of 1,000 "Hyperchrome Panthers" swarm minifigures were also released in the initial launch as the 'most valuable' of the toys. Prices of the toys range between $4.99 and $24.99.

== See also ==
- MrBeast Burger
- Lunchly
