= Piripenguins =

British children's animated series

Piripenguins is a British–Italian children's animated television series aimed at five to eight year olds. It was created by Massimo Fenati, produced by Eaglet Films, and commissioned by the BBC and the Italian broadcaster RAI. It was also financially supported by the UK Global Screen Fund and the British Film Institute. The CGI combined with 2D elements animated series consists of 52 eleven-minute episodes created by Red Monk Studio and Wild Child Animation. The first half of the series premiered on CBeebies (UK) on 19 May 2025 and was available to stream on BBC iPlayer on the same day. The second half of the first season started airing on 17 November 2025. The show also launched on ABC Kids Australia (and streaming on ABC iview) on 14 July 2025, and on Rai Yoyo (also streaming on RaiPlay) on 21 December 2025.

Set on a remote iceberg, the show follows a cheerful colony of five expressive penguins: Pancake, Nugget, Brinicle, Looph, and Flutter. Their personalities range from neat and cautious to adventurous and inventive. Through everyday surprises, comedic mishaps, and imaginative challenges, the group learns about friendship, teamwork, and self-discovery.

== Production ==
The series was a co-production between Eaglet Films and Red Monk Studio, in collaboration with Wild Child Animation. The show was created and directed by Massimo Fenati, with Tess Cuming serving as executive producer, Will Adams as episodic director, and Beth Gardiner acting as commissioning editor for CBeebies.

The production team consisted of around 37 animators and 24 VFX artists.

== Characters ==
=== Main protagonists ===
- Pancake – Prefers quiet, relaxing life, taking care of his algae plants, and is often the calm counterbalance to Nugget's energy. Voiced by Chris Lew Kum Hoi.
- Nugget – Thrill-seeker, energetic, keeps hers, and Pancake's, shared cave messy with sporting gear, skateboards, and excitement. Voiced by Lois Chimimba.
- Brinicle – Creative and imaginative, slightly a show-off, but loves acting, painting, singing and all kinds of arts. Voiced by Raj Ghatak.
- Flutter – Carefree, impulsive, playful troublemaker with a fondness for propeller hats. Voiced by Christopher Dane.
- Looph – Shy genius and inventor who lives in her lab, always ready to help her friends through clever contraptions. Voiced by Rose Shalloo.

=== Additional iceberg-side residents ===
- Millie, the Squid – The grumpy schemer and the penguins' nemesis who nonetheless values the Piris' company. Voiced by Beth Chalmers.
- Shirley – The owner of The Krispy Krill restaurant; calm under pressure and a dependable friend to the penguins. Voiced by Beth Chalmers.
- Frazil – The librarian of the Berg. Voiced by Rob Rackstraw.

== Episodes ==
=== Piripenguins – Season 1 episode list ===
Episode no.	Title	Release date
1	Nugget's Nuglets	19 May 2025
2	Pancake's Syncing Feeling	19 May 2025
3	The Merguin	19 May 2025
4	Flashy Flippers	19 May 2025
5	The Piri Fitness Craze	19 May 2025
6	The Mystery Gossiper	19 May 2025
7	Baking Mad	19 May 2025
8	Detective Pancake Investigates	19 May 2025
9	Penguin Games	19 May 2025
10	Misty Mountain Mystery	19 May 2025
11	My Fair Pancake	19 May 2025
12	Gone Bird	19 May 2025
13	Flutter's Honour	19 May 2025
14	Top of the Swaps	19 May 2025
15	The Wishing Tree	19 May 2025
16	Pancake's Party Panic	19 May 2025
17	A Whale of a Problem	19 May 2025
18	Looph 2.0	19 May 2025
19	The Lucky Charm	19 May 2025
20	Nugget's Muddy Mishap	19 May 2025
21	Brinicle's Shopping Spree	19 May 2025
22	The Millie Mix-Up	19 May 2025
23	One Flutter Too Many	19 May 2025
24	Brinicle's Bestaurant	19 May 2025
25	The Mysterious Monster	19 May 2025
26	The Piris' Inky Issue	19 May 2025
27	Tip of the Tongue	17 November 2025
28	Big Sister Nugget	17 November 2025
29	The Slide	17 November 2025
30	Brinicle Hits the Wrong Note	17 November 2025
31	The Jukebox Jam	17 November 2025
32	Pancake's Big Beak Freakout	17 November 2025
33	Flutter's Fossil Find	17 November 2025
34	Super Nugget	17 November 2025
35	Operation Seal	17 November 2025
36	Rumble on the Radio	17 November 2025
37	The Piri Rule Book	17 November 2025
38	Slimy Sammy	17 November 2025
39	Tall Tales	17 November 2025
40	Five Piris and a Little Egg	17 November 2025
41	The Dance Dispute	17 November 2025
42	Piris, I Shrunk the Looph	17 November 2025
43	When You Wish Upon a Whale	17 November 2025
44	The Crustacean Vacation	17 November 2025
45	It's a Wonderful Nugget	17 November 2025
46	It's Berg Day!	17 November 2025
47	The Fishy Treasure Hunt	17 November 2025
48	The Emperor's New Feathers	17 November 2025
49	Stink or Sink	17 November 2025
50	Looph's Frosty Feelings	17 November 2025
51	Piri-O-UFO	17 November 2025
52	Coconut Island	17 November 2025
