= Yooz (film) =

- Official poster of "Yooz"
- یوز
- Directed by: Reza Arzangi
- Written by: Reza Arzangi
- Produced by: Ehsan Kaveh
- Starring: Nasrollah Madghalchi, Naser Mamdouh
- Music by: Afshin Azizi
- Production company: Soure Cinema Development Organization
- Distributed by: Bahman Sabz Institute
- Release date: 23 September 2025
- Running time: 90 minutes
- Country: Iran
- Language: Persian

Yooz (Persian: یوز) is an Iranian animated feature film produced in 2025, directed by Reza Arzangi and produced by Ehsan Kaveh.

== Plot ==
The story follows an Iranian cheetah that has been raised in New York City and has grown accustomed to an urban lifestyle. Over time, it feels a profound sense of alienation and begins to yearn for its homeland. The cheetah embarks on a journey back to Iran in search of its roots and true identity.

During this adventurous journey, the cheetah faces numerous obstacles and challenges, both in nature and within itself. Ultimately, it realizes that returning to its homeland is not merely a physical journey, but also a spiritual and cultural one. The narrative highlights themes of environmental awareness, the preservation of endangered species, and the importance of cultural identity.

== Production ==
The film was produced by the Soure Cinema Development Organization and is considered the first Iranian 3D animated feature about nature of Iran. The main voice actors are Nasrollah Madghalchi and Naser Mamdouh, with dubbing direction by Hamed Azizi. The project supervisor was Seyed Amin Jafari, with a team of professional Iranian animators working on visual effects and character design. The film’s music was composed by Afshin Azizi.

== Release ==
The film was released in cinemas across Iran on 23 September 2025.
