= Shopkins =

2014 Australian toy line created by Moose Toys

- Type: Toys, figures, dolls
- Invented by: Jacqui Tobias
- Company: Moose Toys
- Country: United States, Australia
- Availability: 2014 - 2023–present
- Materials: Plastic, rubber
- Slogan: "Once you shop, you can't stop!" (Seasons 1-11) "Real Brands. Real Cute." (Seasons 12-13) "Things You Love Made Micro!" (Seasons 14-17/Real Littles series)
- Official website

Shopkins are a range of miniature collectable toys manufactured by Moose Toys. Originally based on grocery store items, appliances, and clothing items, each plastic Shopkin figure has a recognizable face and unique name. They also have special finishes, including matte and glitter. The collectable toys (which are designated as common, rare, ultra-rare, special edition, limited edition, and exclusive) also expanded into lines of clothing, trading cards, and other related merchandise.

Shopkins was originally developed as a successor to Mighty Beanz and Trash Pack. The toy line was first released in 2014. As of 2025, there are seventeen seasons of the toys. There are also series that represent holidays, such as Halloween, Easter, and Christmas. There are also spin-offs, such as the Kindi Kids line of dolls, which was released in August 2019.

== History ==
Shopkins were designed and developed by Moose Toys in Melbourne in April 2013. Co-chief Paul Solomon credits his mother, Jacqui Tobias, director of girls’ products, for the idea of Shopkins. Moose Toys had success with its line of Mighty Beanz and Trash Pack collectible figurines targeted towards boys, but it lacked a market for girls. Shopkins was initially produced as a product for girls; however, it can appeal to boys as well.Success of the Shopkins toy line later led to various types of official merchandise, apps, three movies, music, and spin-offs. Additionally, there were also auctioned Shopkins on eBay, San Diego Comic-Con exclusive sets, and more.

Shopkins had been discontinued in the year 2023.They made a recent comeback in April 2026 following social media posts on platforms such as Instagram and TikTok

== Shopkins toys ==
=== Figures ===
Shopkins figurines are about 1 inch in height and 1/2 inch in width, roughly the size of a United States quarter. Each figurine has a face, a name, and its own personality. They are distributed in bright coloured packaging with bubble letters. Shopkins are based on everyday items: for example, there is a sweet apple named Apple Blossom, a chocolate bar named Cheeky Chocolate, a lipstick named Lippy Lips, a chocolate chip cookie named Kooky Cookie, and a strawberry named Strawberry Kiss. There are hundreds of Shopkins in the Shopkins World. Shopkins are organized into categories, such as Fruit & Veg and Bakery. They can be found in a variety of packs; 2, 5, 12, and Mega (20) packs are the most well known. However, for a limited time, 10-packs were sold during Season 1. Season 9 would retire the 5-packs indefinitely in place for Shoppet packs. With the debut of Mini Packs in Season 10, the 2, 12, and Mega packs were reconfigured into 1-packs (consisting of one Shopkin and one Mini Pack for one complete figure), 8-packs (consisting of eight Shopkins and eight Mini Packs for eight complete figures), and Variety (12) packs (consisting of 12 Shopkins and 12 Mini Packs for 12 complete figures), respectively. In Season 11, variety packs would be replaced by Family Fun Packs (consisting of a family of five Shopkins for one large Mini Pack and eight other Shopkins and Mini Packs for 22 items total). For the Real Littles line, the 2-packs (consisting of two Shopkins and two Mini Packs for two complete figures) would return alongside the 8-packs introduced in Season 10. After being introduced in Season 12, these packs would remain for Season 13. In Season 14, the series would reintroduce the Mega packs (now consisting of 13 Shopkins and 13 Mini Packs for 13 complete figures). These packs would remain for Seasons 15, 16, and 17.

=== Rarities ===
Shopkins are collected and valued based on their rarity. Moose classifies the Shopkins degrees of rarity as Common (White and Purple in Season 12 onward), Exclusive (Turquoise), Limited Edition (Gold), Rare (Green), Special Edition (Blue), and Ultra Rare (Pink). Special Edition Shopkins can be found only in 8- or 12-packs of Shopkins.

=== Materials ===
Materials used for Shopkins were rubbery-plastic, brought from China, and from Season 10 onward, the plastic came from Vietnam.

=== Seasons ===
- Season 1: The first season of Shopkins was released in June 2014 and came out in major retailers. The first season of Shopkins contained over 150 characters to collect, all based on grocery store items. Some of the teams include Fruit & Veg, Bakery, Sweet Treats, and more. The Limited Edition Shopkins come in a metallic finish.
- Season 2: The second season of Shopkins was released in December 2014. The season featured new teams including Baby, Homewares, Cleaning & Laundry and Shoes. The Limited Edition Shopkins were covered in bling.
- Season 3: The third season of Shopkins was released in June 2015. The new teams Stationery, International Food, and Hats were added to the season. The third season was the first season in which Limited Edition Shopkins had their own specific theme; the team name for the Limited Editions was Cool Jewels Shopkins.
- Season 4: The fourth season of Shopkins was released in December 2015. This season introduced Petkins, which are Shopkins with faces that resemble animals. Other new categories include Party Time, Petshop, Garden, and Accessories. The Limited Edition Shopkins in the season were the Perfume Pretties Shopkins.
- Season 5: The fifth season was released on May 1, 2016. New categories include Charms, Tech, Music and Sport. The Limited Edition Shopkins are the Tiny Toys Shopkins.
- Season 6: The sixth season, also known as Chef Club, was released in October 2016. Instead of having specific teams, Shopkins were food ingredients for various recipes, meaning they belonged to multiple ones at once depending on their type. The Limited Edition Shopkins are the CUTEtensils Shopkins and are based on utensils instead of food. The sixth season is the first season to have Shoppies in the season, with for this season, under the Chef Club line.
- Season 7: The seventh season, also known as Join the Party, was released on February 5, 2017. The special edition Shopkins for this season are the Topkins, which can be stacked on top of each other. Also, instead of coming in recipe books, they come in presents. The Limited Editions in the season are the Hollywood Shopkins.
- Season 8: The eighth season, also known as World Vacation, was released on June 1, 2017. The season was divided in three waves for its 3 respective continents featuring Shopkins from around the world. The first wave is from Europe released on June 1, 2017, which features the countries France, United Kingdom, Italy, Germany, and Spain. The second wave is from Asia and features the countries China, Japan, Australia (despite not being an Asian country) and India. The third wave features the Americas which features both of the continents North America and South America respectively, and features the countries Canada, the United States, Mexico, and Brazil, however, unlike the first two waves which had one country have Ultra Rares, a different theme was given for the Ultra Rares which were the Gleamtastic Holidays Shopkins, based on several holidays found in the countries, such as Valentines Day and Independence Day for example. This time in this season, the Shopkins now come in hotel rooms. The Special Edition Shopkins in this season are the Bag Charms while the Limited Editions are the Shimmering Snow Globes Shopkins.
- Season 9: The ninth season, also known as Wild Style, was released in January 2018. The theme for the season was animals, which included dogs, cats, rabbits, tigers, cows, monkeys, skunks, pandas, and unicorns. The teams in the season were considered “tribes”, which in each one contained new Shopkins with their own team's finishes, which also included returning Shopkins, like Apple Blossom and Cupcake Queen. They can be found in pet-pods. The season also introduced Shoppets, which are fuzzy, anthropomorphic animals. During Season 10 (the next season), a second wave of Shoppets were made. Shoppies in the season were also returning characters but now with animal themes. A new Shoppie for this season, Mystabella, was released as a Limited Edition Shoppie. There were also bundled sets of Shoppies and Shoppets available. The limited editions in the season are the Shimmery Unicorn Shopkins, which come in a metallic finish and a unicorn theme.
- Season 10: The tenth season, also known as Mini Packs, was released in June 2018. In this season, all the Shopkins from Seasons 1, 2, and 3 were rereleased but had the same colors as their own static art and colored irises and came in Mini Packs. Some also came with new finishes, including the “hot spot” finish, which featured Shopkins with spots on them. The limited editions were all metallic.
- Season 11: The eleventh season, also known as Family Mini Packs, was released in January 2019. Similar to the previous season, the season also comes with Mini Packs of their own, but now features Shopkins as “families”. Each team is considered a “family”, which contains new Shopkins (which contain a Father, Mother, a Sibling or Relative) and a new kind of Shopkin, called a Babykin, was released as smaller Shopkins to look like “babies” in the family. The limited editions are the Bubs N Spices family Shopkins.
- Season 12: The twelfth season, also known as Real Littles, was released in August 2019. The Mini Packs are themed after real brands, mainly from food such as some of the Kellogg's brands, Welch's, and more, with the exception of the Special Editions (which are the Skechers shoes Shopkins).
- Season 13: The thirteenth season was released in January 2020. The “Real Littles” theme keeps on going, but now comes in a theme of various food from the freezer aisle. There are Shopkins based on the Unilever family of brands, new Special Edition Slush Puppy Shopkins, and more.
- Season 14: The fourteenth season was released in July 2020. The season was notable for dropping the “Shopkins” name in place of Real Littles, however it would still be referred to as Season 14 on packaging. In this season, some of the Shopkins from Seasons 12 and 13 are rereleased (similar to Season 10 when they rereleased the Shopkins from the first three seasons itself) and this season is given a vending machine theme.
- Season 15: After more than a year of hiatus, the fifteenth season was released in October 2021. Upon reveal, packaging stated that the season would release in multiple waves, known as drops. Season 15 Drop 1 included some Shopkins from the previous three seasons of Real Littles but also included new characters recycled from already existing characters designs. Season 15 Drop 2 released in January 2022, and included all-new characters. This season has a Micro Mart theme and features new Special Edition ICEE slushie Shopkins.
- Season 16: The sixteenth season was released in July 2022. The Shopkins name would return to packaging after being absent for the two previous seasons and also had a Snack Time theme.
- Season 17: The seventeenth season released in January 2023. The season continued the Snack Time theme from the previous season. The season marked the return of the beloved Fruit & Veg category, which had not been in a season of Shopkins for nearly 5 years at the time of release. The Special Editions for the season were the White Mystery Color Reveal Airheads, which were white Airheads that would change colors once placed in water.

== Spin-offs ==
=== Shopkins Shoppies ===
Shopkins Shoppies, the first spin-off of Shopkins released in October 2015, is a line of 5-inch dolls featuring teenage girls with brushable, colourful hair, accessories, exclusive Shopkins entitled Shopkins B.F.F.S. and have themes such as food, flowers, animals, and fashion. The dolls also come with VIP codes (which are cards or mini magazines, or secret diaries [Lil’ Secrets only] depending on the line), which can be used for the Shopkins World app. The original line consisted of three dolls, Jessicake, Bubbleisha and Popette, respectively, later add two new Shoppies, Peppa-Mint and Donatina, in December 2015. Separate lines of the dolls were also produced, including Core Shoppies and Style Shoppies. Some were also found in various seasons. Special Edition dolls were also made, with the first being Gemma Stone, named after the audition Shopkin of the same name, was released as a Walmart exclusive in November 2016 for a Black Friday sale. Beginning in 2018, with second Special Edition Shoppie Chandelia, Special Edition Shoppies were released every year, starting in October, and as Target exclusives. Starting in 2016, Limited Edition Shoppies were also available during events in San Diego Comic-Con until 2018. After the release of Kindi Kids, the series would be silently discontinued; their final Shoppie, Wynter Frost, was released in October 2020.

Shoppies

- Jessicake (Oct. 2015)
- Bubbleisha (Oct. 2015)
- Popette (Oct. 2015)
- Peppa-Mint (Dec. 2015)
- Donatina (Dec. 2015) *Toys R Us Exclusive*
- Rainbow Kate (June 2016)
- Sara Sushi (June 2016)
- Pam Cake (June 2016)
- Popette (Aug. 2016)
- Pineapple Lily (Aug. 2016) *Target Exclusive*
- Kirstea (Dec. 2016)
- Pirouetta (Dec. 2016)
- Lippy Lulu (Jan. 2017)

Core Shoppies

- Cocolette (Feb. 2017)
- Daisy Petals (Feb. 2017)
- Lucy Smoothie (Feb. 2017)
- Polli Polish (Feb. 2017)
- Marsha Mello (June 2017)
- Pippa Melon (June 2017)
- Blossom Apples (Aug. 2017)
- Melodine (Aug. 2017)
- Coco Cookie (Jan. 2018)
- Fria Froyo (Jan. 2018)
- Lemony Limes (Jan. 2018)
- Makaella Wish (Jan. 2018)

Style Shoppies

- Lolita Pops (May 2018)
- Pommie (May 2018)
- Summer Peaches (May 2018)
- Jascenta (June 2018)
- B'Anchor (Aug. 2018)
- Palmela Tree (Aug. 2018)
- Sandi Shores (Aug. 2018)
- Berri D'lish (Dec. 2018)
- Kokonut (Dec. 2018)
- Isla Hibiscus (Dec. 2018)
- Popsi Blue (Dec. 2018)
- Crystal Snow (May 2019) *UK Exclusive*
- Sunny Meadows (May 2019) *UK Exclusive*
- Riana Radio (May 2019) *UK Exclusive*
- Ellerina Slippers (May 2019) *UK Exclusive*

Chef Club

- Jessicake (Oct. 2016)
- Peppa-Mint (Oct. 2016)
- Bubbleisha (Oct. 2016)
- Donatina (Oct. 2016)

Join The Party

- Rainbow Kate (Feb. 2017)
- Bridie (Feb. 2017)
- Rosie Bloom (Feb. 2017)
- Tiara Sparkles (Feb. 2017)
- Tippy Teapot (Feb. 2017)
- Pineapple Lily (Apr. 2017)
- Pretti Pressie (Apr. 2017)

World Vacation

- Jessicake (June 2017)
- Macy Macaron (June 2017)
- Spaghetti Sue (June 2017)
- Zoe Zoom (June 2017) *Toys R Us Exclusive*
- Peppa-Mint (July 2017)
- Bubbleisha (Aug. 2017)
- Sara Sushi (Aug. 2017)
- Coralee (Aug. 2017)
- Donatina (Oct. 2017)
- Rainbow Kate (Oct. 2017)
- Pinkie Cola (Oct. 2017)
- Rosa Piñata (Oct. 2017)
- Skyanna (Nov. 2017) *Walmart Exclusive*

Wild Style

- Jessicake (Jan. 2018)
- Rainbow Kate (Jan. 2018)
- Bella Bow (Jan. 2018)
- Lippy Lulu (Jan. 2018)
- Mystabella (Jan. 2018)
- Pirouetta (Jan. 2018)
- Mia Milk (Jan. 2018) *Toys R Us Exclusive*
- Peppa-Mint (Mar. 2018)
- Donatina (Mar. 2018)
- Candy Sweets (Mar. 2018)
- Pippa Melon (Mar. 2018)
- Valentina Hearts (Mar. 2018)

Lil' Secrets

- Jessicake (Aug. 2018)
- Peppa-Mint (Aug. 2018)
- Donatina (Aug. 2018)
- Marsha Mello (Aug. 2018)
- Rainbow Kate (Aug. 2018)
- Sia Shell (Sept. 2018)
- Tia Tigerlily (Sept. 2018)
- Bella Bow (Jan. 2019)
- Jenni Lantern (Jan. 2019)
- Lippy Lulu (Jan. 2019)
- Pearlina (Jan. 2019)
- Popette (May 2019)
- Cocolette (May 2019)

Real Littles

- Chrissy Puffs (Aug. 2019)
- Stacey Cakes (Jan. 2020)

SDCC Exclusive

- Jessicake (July 2016)
- Bubbleisha (July 2017)
- Peppa-Mint (July 2018)
- Chip Choc (July 2018)

Store Exclusive

- Bubbleisha (Sept. 2016) *Kohl's Exclusive*
- Gemma Stone (Nov. 2016) *Walmart Exclusive*
- Pretti Pressie (Sept. 2017) *Kohl's Exclusive*
- Lucy Smoothie (Sept. 2017) *Costco Exclusive*
- Polli Polish (Sept. 2017) *Costco Exclusive*
- Pirouetta (Nov. 2017) *Amazon Exclusive*
- Cocolette (June 2018) *International Exclusive*
- Bridie (Sept. 2018) *Costco Exclusive*
- Macy Macaron (Sept. 2018) *Costco Exclusive*
- Chandelia (Sept. 2018) *Target Exclusive*
- Bubbleisha (Nov. 2018) *Walmart Exclusive*
- Pippa Melon (Jan. 2019) *Target Exclusive*
- Angelique Star (Oct. 2019) *Target Exclusive*
- Wynter Frost (Oct. 2020) *Target Exclusive*

=== Happy Places ===
The second spin-off of Shopkins, Happy Places, was released in August 2016. The line features many playsets, such as houses and other buildings, and can be decorated with Petkins furniture. The furniture sets in the line had Shopkins faces and were themed after various animals. Smaller Shoppies were also made, entitled Lil' Shoppies. A Disney version for the series was also produced. The series also has store-exclusive playsets, including Sparkle Hill playsets (Walmart exclusive) and a Movie Night Besties pack with exclusive Jessicake and Popette Lil’ Shoppies (Big W exclusive). The initial slogan was “Decorate Your Place with a Cute Lil’ Face!”; this slogan was later changed to “Turn Any Space into a Cute Place!”. With only seven seasons produced, the line was discontinued in 2020.

Season 1: Wave 1

- Popette (Happy Home)
- Bubbleisha (Bathing Bunny Welcome Pack)
- Coco Cookie (Kitty Kitchen Welcome Pack)
- Jessicake (Dreamy Bear Welcome Pack)
- Kirstea (Puppy Parlor Lil' Shoppie)
- Lippy Lulu (Bathing Bunny Lil' Shoppie)
- Melodine (Dreamy Bear Lil' Shoppie)
- Rainbow Kate (Kitty Kitchen Lil' Shoppie)
- Sara Sushi (Puppy Parlor Lil' Shoppie)
- Spaghetti Sue (Kitty Kitchen Lil' Shoppie)

Season 1: Wave 2

- Lucy Smoothie (Sparkle Hill Happy Home)
- Kristina Apples (Kitty Dinner Party Lil' Shoppie)
- Riana Radio (Slumber Bear Party Lil' Shoppie)
- Tiara Sparkles (Kitty Dinner Party Lil' Shoppie)

Season 2: Wave 1

- Peppa-Mint (Pool and Sun Deck)
- Milly Mops (Bunny Laundry Welcome Pack)
- Queenie Hearts (Mousy Hangout Welcome Pack)
- Rosie Bloom (Puppy Patio Welcome Pack)
- Candy Sweets (Slumber Bear Party Lil' Shoppie)
- Chelsea Cheeseburger (Puppy Parlor Lil' Shoppie)
- Cocolette (Dreamy Bear Lil' Shoppie)
- Daisy Petals (Puppy Patio Lil' Shoppie)
- Polli Polish (Bathing Bunny Lil' Shoppie)
- Tippy Teapot (Kitty Kitchen Lil' Shoppie)

Season 2: Wave 2

- Fria Froyo (Puppy Patio Lil' Shoppie)
- Macy Macaron (Kitty Kitchen Lil' Shoppie)
- Pia Puzzle (Mousy Hangout Lil' Shoppie)

=== Cutie Cars ===
The third spin-off, Cutie Cars, was released in August 2017. The line featured cars and mini Shopkins to ride them. The cars had Shopkins faces and themes such as food, fashion and accessories. There were also Limited Editions produced before Season 3, as well as an exclusive set from San Diego Comic-Con, which were two Golden Cutie Cars in 2018. Starting in Season 3 onwards, Moose developed Color Changing Cutie Cars and Color Change Fantasy Cutie Cars in Season 4. The slogan is “I Heart QT CARS”. With only four seasons produced, the line was also discontinued in 2020.

Season 1

Season 1 of Cutie Cars include:

Single Packs

- Cupcake Cruiser
- Choc Chip Racer
- Strawberry Speedy Seeds
- Popcorn Moviegoer
- Donut Express
- Sundae Scooter
- Lemon Limo
- Peely Apple Wheels
- Traveling Taco
- Banana Bumper
- Motor Melon
- Frozen Yocart
- Ice Cream Dream Car
- Jelly Bean Machine
- Lollipop Soft Top
- Hotdog Hotrod
- Zoomy Noodles
- Jelly Joyride
- Milk Moover
- Bumpy Burger
- Wheely Wishes

Fast 'n' Fruits Collection

- Orange Rush
- Kiwi Cutie
- Zappy Pineapple

Candy Combo Collection

- Candi Combi
- Mint Sprinter
- Candy Heart Car

Freezy Riders Collection

- Soft Swerve
- Strawberry Scoupé
- Zippy Popsicle

Bumper Bakery Collection

- Happy B. SUV
- Choc-Cherry Wheels
- Rainbow Rider

Super Stylish Limited Edition Cars

- Flashy Fashionsta
- Sneaky Speedster
- Royal Roadster

Drive Thru Diner

- Wizzy Soda

Season 2

Season 2 of Cutie Cars was released in January 2018. They include:

Single Packs

- Toasty Coaster
- Pickup Pumpkin
- Speedy Summer Fruits
- Moto Gelato
- Beauty Van
- Ballet Coupe
- Tropic Rush
- Kissy Cab
- Hatrod
- Wheely Sneaky
- Drifter Gift
- Go-Go Donut
- Yo Go-Cart
- Bubby Beeps
- Berry Fast Croissant
- Applemobile
- Icy Roller
- Peanut Butter Pickup
- Rain-Go Cake
- Apple Pie Ride
- Heart Braker
- Chase Cookie

Precious Ride Limited Edition Cars

- Treasure Drove
- Limo-Queen
- Rollin' Gemstones

Pretty Performers Collection

- Scooty Tutu
- Zippy Lippy
- Melody Moover

Speedy Style Collection

- Street Sneaker
- Cruisey Cap
- Sunny Sedan

Dessert Drivers Collection

- Fruity Zoomer
- Cherry-Pie Chaser
- Banana Split Trip

Breakfast Beeps Collection

- Pop-Up Truck
- Cruisy Croissant
- Bagel Beeper

=== Lil' Secrets ===
The fourth spin-off, Lil’ Secrets, was released in August 2018. The line is similar to Polly Pocket; it features lockets, which were playsets, that came with Tenny Shoppies and Tenny Shopkins. Regular-sized Shoppies were also produced. Starting in Season 3, mini stores and houses were released, under the name Secret Shops. The themes for Seasons 2-3 were Party Pop-ups and Shop-key-pers, respectively. With only four seasons produced, the line was also discontinued in 2020.

Secret Locks

- So Sweet Candy with Lolita Pops (August 2018)
- Donut Stop with Donatina (August 2018)
- Pretty Paws with Bell (August 2018)
- Pretty Petals with Daisy Petals (August 2018)
- Great Bakes Cupcakes with Jessicake (August 2018)
- Make Up Salon with Lippy Lulu (August 2018)
- Cutie Fruity Smoothies with Pineapple Lily (August 2018)
- Cute Scoops Ice Cream with Peppa-Mint (August 2018)
- Dainty Dance Studio with Pirouetta (August 2018)
- Bubbling Beauty Day Spa with Bub-Lea (January 2019)
- Princess Hair Salon with Bubbleisha (January 2019)
- Peacock Gala with Chandelia (January 2019)
- Lovely Hearts Garden Party with Bridie (January 2019)
- Genie's D'lish Wish Café with Gemma Stone (January 2019)
- Fab Fairy Fashions with Pommie (January 2019)

Secret Lockets

- Pizza Paradise with Spaghetti Sue (August 2018)
- Locally Grown Farmers Market with Summer Peaches (August 2018)
- Lil' Giggles Baby Boutique with Mia Milk (August 2018)
- Petite Boutique with Bella Bow (August 2018)
- Lil' Gems Jewelry with Tiara Sparkles (August 2018)
- Tiny Tunes Music with Melodine (August 2018)
- Swirls Froyo Bar with Fria Froyo (August 2018)
- Picnic Dreams with Valentina Hearts (August 2018)
- Rock Pool Swim School with Coralee (August 2018)
- Fairy Cake Birthday with Makella Wish (January 2019)
- Butterfly Nail Boutique with Polli Polish (January 2019)
- Wonderland Picnic with Queenie Hearts (January 2019)
- Masquerade Theatre with Hollie Wood (January 2019)
- Mermaid's Adventure with Starla (January 2019)
- Rodeo Smoothie Bar with Lucie Smoothie (January 2019)

Shoppies

- Jessicake (August 2018)
- Peppa-Mint (August 2018)
- Donatina (August 2018)
- Marsha Mello (August 2018)
- Rainbow Kate with Bedroom Hideaway playset (August 2018)
- Sia Shell (August 2018)
- Tia Tigerlily (August 2018)
- Bella Bow (January 2019)
- Jenni Lantern (January 2019)
- Lippy Lulu (January 2019)
- Pearlina (January 2019)
- Cocolette (January 2019)
- Popette (January 2019)

Secret Shops

- Rosie Bloom Café with Rosie Bloom (June 2019)
- Cool Scoops Café with Popsi Blue (June 2019)
- Sweet Retreat Candy Shop with Candy Sweets (June 2019)
- Happy Steps Dance Studio with Ellerina Slippers (June 2019)
- Game On Arcade with Pretti Pressie (June 2019)
- Sprinkles Surprise Bakery with Sprinkles (June 2019)
- Lovely Llama Style Salon with Pommie (January 2020)
- Funny Bunny Bakery with Fria Froyo (January 2020)
- Cutie Cat Cafe with Coco Cookie (January 2020)
- Penguin Slushie Shop with Pinky Cola (January 2020)

Secret Bag Tags

- Precious Perfumery with Jascenta (June 2019)
- Delish Donut Stop with Donatina (June 2019)
- Burger Bite Diner with Chelsea Cheeseburger (June 2019)
- Blossom Sushi Eatery with Sara Sushi (June 2019)
- Tiny Paws Vet with Princess Moondream (June 2019)
- Le Sweet Petite Café with Macy Macaron (June 2019)

Playsets

- Secret Small Mall with Glossie and Rainbow Kate (June 2019)

=== Kindi Kids ===
Kindi Kids is the fifth spin-off of Shopkins released in August 2019, featuring the Shoppies dolls as toddlers, with the slogan being “Yay! Let’s Play!”. The line featured ten-inch dolls of the Shoppies dolls as toddlers, featuring a bobble-head and glittery eyes as well as two exclusive Shopkins that magically function by playing with them. Various playsets were also released under the Kindi Fun name tag. Unlike the rest of the franchise, the Kindi Kids line of dolls is meant for preschoolers. This is the only line of the Shopkins series to currently be ongoing.

The list of dolls released include:

Snack Time Friends

- Jessicake (August 2019)
- Peppa-Mint (August 2019)
- Donatina (August 2019)
- Marsha Mello (August 2019)
- Rainbow Kate (December 2019)
- Summer Peaches (February 2020)

Fun Time Friends

- Cindy Pops (August 2020)
- Mystabella (August 2020)
- Bella Bow (February 2021)
- Pirouetta (February 2021)

Dress Up Friends

- Donatina (August 2020)
- Marsha Mello (August 2020)

Kindi Fun Oven

- Donatina (August 2020)
- Summer Peaches (August 2020)
- Bella Bow (August 2021)

Scented Big Sisters

- Berri D'LISH (August 2021)
- Pearlina (August 2021)
- Tiara Sparkles (August 2021)
- Candy Sweets (February 2022)
- Flora Flutters (February 2022)
- Angelina Wings (August 2022)
- Tropicarla (August 2022)

Sweet Treats Friends

- Bubbleisha (August 2021)
- Cici Candy (August 2021)

Scented Baby Sisters

- Mini Mello (August 2021)
- Blossom Berri (August 2021)
- Teenie Tiara (August 2021)
- Poppi Pearl (August 2021)
- Bonni Bubbles (August 2021)
- Cutie Cake (August 2021)
- Mirabella (August 2021)
- Pastel Sweets (February 2022)
- Fifi Flutters (February 2022)
- Patticake (August 2022)
- Winnie Wings (August 2022)
- Tulla Tropics (August 2022)
- Mimi Mint (February 2023)

Dress Up Magic

- Jessicake & Patticake Fairy (August 2022)
- Marsha Mello & Mini Mello Unicorn (August 2022)
- Angelina Wings & Winnie Wings Angel (August 2022)
- Tropicarla & Tulla Tropics Mermaid (August 2022)
- Secret Saddle Rainbow Star & Mystabella (August 2022)
- Peppa-Mint & Mimi Mint Pixie (February 2023)

Show & Tell Pets

- Pupkin the Puppy (February 2021)
- Marlo the Bunny (February 2021)
- Teah the Koala (February 2021)
- Caterina the Kitty (February 2021)

Party Pets

- Cuppipuppi (August 2022)
- Kitty Mello (August 2022)
- Troppi Koala (August 2022)
- Popsie Mint (February 2023)

Playsets Dolls

- Back-To-School Fun with Jessicake (Summer 2020)
- Shiver n’ Shake Rainbow Kate (August 2020)
- Doctors Dress Up with Marsha Mello (August 2020; Target exclusive)
- Kindi Fun Oven (Donatina & Summer Peaches variants released August 2020, Bella Bow variant released August 2021)
- Kindi Fun Delivery Scooter (2020; BJ's Wholesale Club exclusive, comes with original Marsha Mello and recolored Delivery Scooter)
- Doctor Bag with Rainbow Kate (August 2022)
- Tea Party with Kirstea (August 2022)

=== Kindi Kids Minis ===
Kindi Kids made a spin-off, called Kindi Kids Minis, which featured miniature versions of the 10-inch dolls, but still with the bobble-head feature and glittery eyes. Various playsets were made featuring vehicles like scooters, motorcycles, and cars, and a school bus playset, each with exclusive minis. The line was released early in January 2021 (Amazon) and February 2021 (retailers), respectively.

Season 1

- Marsha Mello (February 2021)
- Rainbow Kate (February 2021)
- Summer Peaches (February 2021)
- Lippy Lulu (February 2021)
- Cindy Pops (February 2021)
- Pirouetta (February 2021)

Season 2

- Jessicake (August 2021)
- Donatina (August 2021)
- Mystabella (August 2021)
- Berri D'LISH (August 2021)
- Pearlina (August 2021)
- Tiara Sparkles (August 2021)

Season 3

- Candy Sweets (February 2022)
- Flora Flutters (February 2022)

Kindi Mini Vehicles

- Donatina's Car (February 2021)
- Rainbow Kate's Airplane (February 2021)
- Lippy Lulu's Scooter (February 2021)
- Peppa-Mint's Scooter (February 2022)

Playsets

- Bobble School Bus with Marsha Mello (February 2021)
- Rainbow Unicorn Carnival with Rainbow Kate (August 2021)

== Media ==
=== Web series ===
In August 2014, Moose Toys built brand awareness with their Shopkins short cartoon videos on their YouTube channel Shopkins World (now known as MooseTube Squad to promote other toys by Moose), but it was the YouTube videos of consumers unwrapping and playing with the toys that helped bring the line to mainstream prominence. The series was released on June 23, 2014. Canadian-based WildBrain distributes the webisodes on the WildBrain - Cutie Cartoons channel. The series would end on October 4, 2018, after 85 episodes during the release of Season 10.

=== Movies ===
An animated film, called Shopkins: Chef Club, was released on Digital HD on October 18, 2016, and on DVD on October 25, 2016, by Universal Pictures Home Entertainment, to promote toys for Season 6. The movie had mostly positive reviews, although some reviewers had concerns at the overt consumerism. Shopkins: Chef Club has a duration of 45 minutes.

A sequel, Shopkins: World Vacation, was released on theaters in Australia on October 5, 2017, and on Digital HD and DVD on October 17, 2017, by Universal Pictures Home Entertainment, to promote toys for Season 8, and also the first to feature a guest star, YouTuber CookieSwirlC. Shopkins: World Vacation has a duration of 71 minutes. Another sequel, Shopkins: Wild, was released on theaters in Australia on March 1, 2018, and on Digital HD and DVD on April 17, 2018, by Universal Pictures Home Entertainment, to promote toys for Season 9. Shopkins: Wild has a duration of 75 minutes.

The Shopkins movies were also available on Netflix; however, all Shopkins movies were removed on November 15, 2020, in which they were only available for 24 months.

==== Synopsis ====
Life's never ordinary in Shopville, but things are about to get a little extraordinary with the arrival of the Chef Club. In order to be accepted into the club, the Shoppies will have to compete showing off their cooking chops!

==== Voice cast ====
- Cassandra Lee Morris as Jessicake and Strawberry Tubs
- Abby Trott as Donatina
- Marieve Herington as Peppa-Mint, Bessie Bowl and Buncho Bananas
- Mariee Devereux as Peppa-Mint (singing voice)
- Erika Harlacher as Bubbleisha, Nina Noodles and Miss Sprinkles
- Kate Murphy as Lippy Lips, Cheeky Chocolate, Kooky Cookie and Apple Blossom
- David Lodge as The Guum Guum Gree

==== Synopsis ====
Grab your boarding pass and come on a worldwide ride with our favorite Shoppies and Shopkins. Vacation with the gang as they meet crazy bandits and go on even crazier adventures! When Kooky Cookie gets caught up in a diamond heist and goes missing, the Shoppies must go on a wild chase around the world to find her and help bring back the 'Shop Diamond' to its royal owner. Watch as they attempt amazing challenges and face Kooky fans to try and clear her name. Fasten your seatbelt for a world vacation you'll never forget!

==== Voice cast ====
- Cassandra Lee Morris as Jessicake
- Abby Trott as Donatina
- Brianna Plantano as Peppa-Mint and Buncho Bananas
- Erika Harlacher as Bubbleisha
- Kate Murphy as Cheeky Chocolate, Strawberry Kiss, Lippy Lips, Apple Blossom and Kooky Cookie
- Brianna Knickerbocker as Macy Macaron
- Reba Buhr as Crispy
- Doug Erholtz as Crumbly
- Cherami Leigh as Skyanna
- Tara Sands as Pinkie Cola
- David Lodge as Admiral Robot
- CookieSwirlC as The Kooky Fan

==== Synopsis ====
Find your 'Wild Style' and come on a totally Pawesome adventure to Pawville to meet the Shoppets! When famous movie stars, Scarletta Gateau and Rubie Blaze recruit the Shopville gang to save the Shoppets, they journey through the jungle and find the amazing world of Pawville. But Pawville and the Shoppets definitely don't need saving and suddenly nothing Scarletta says is as it seems! What's going on? Can the Shopkins, Shoppies and Shoppets rally together to solve the mystery? Find your tribe and get ready for a Wild adventure like no other!

==== Voice cast ====
- Cassandra Lee Morris as Jessicake
- Abby Trott as Donatina
- Brianna Plantano as Peppa-Mint and Buncho Bananas
- Arielle Tuliao as Peppa-Mint (singing voice)
- Kayli Mills as Rainbow Kate
- Kate Murphy as Cheeky Chocolate, Lippy Lips, Apple Blossom and Kooky Cookie
- Laura Stahl as Scarletta Gateau
- Philece Sampler as Rubie Blaze
- Ryan Bartley as Pupkin Cake and Bunny Bow
- Jackie Lastra as Minty Paws
- Rebecca Davis as Duncan and Clover
- Sarah Williams as Bianca Banana
- Mark Whitten as Bruce and Spike
- Allegra Clark as Mystabella

=== Apps ===
Welcome to Shopville/Shopkins World

The first Shopkins app, Welcome to Shopville (later renamed Shopkins World), was a free app released in 2015. In the game, the player can explore many shops in Shopville (such as the Cupcake Bake Shop and the Candy Shop) and can also play minigames. They can also unlock Shopkins by unboxing mini boxes as they collect coins from the games, and can also view their collection. The game is also compatible with the Shoppies’ VIP codes, in which players can type them in their Shopkins collection to unlock rewards, such as various and Shoppies’ exclusive Shopkins. New shops had been added in later updates, including ones based on several seasons of Shopkins to promote the new seasons. In 2017, a café is added, allowing players to customize the area by purchasing furniture with a new currency, which are heart-shaped gems, a trophy area, in which players can check out their trophy collection, as well as changing the customers into any Shopkins character they want. Typing any Shoppies dolls’ VIP codes for the first time can unlock an extension for the café, which is a VIP area, as well as more Shopkins characters, and also Shoppies. The shops shown in the game were all initially free, until the said update in 2017, notably also including even more in-app purchases, the players can complete various quests by Shopkins and collect keys to unlock the shops, milestones for different features added to collect trophies, shops such as the Cupcake Bake Shop and Pet Park being removed (despite the current official description still mentioning the Cupcake Bake Shop) other features being added, complaints about the app having a tendency to crash occasionally, and also other various glitches, causing criticism by several reviews.

Shopkins: Shop n’ Seek

Shopkins: Shop n’ Seek was released in late 2020 and developed by Blipd. In the game, the player can role play as one of the Shoppies characters to visit an AR world to collect and find Shopkins everywhere as well as coins to unlock other worlds as well as other Shoppies. Some worlds also have exclusive Shopkins to find. Then, they can play with their Shopkins in AR anywhere by using the Play mode. They can also see their Shopkins collection. During its initial release, the player must sign in with personal information, but because of criticism in reviews, the game is completely free, and new players can download the game without signing in.

Other apps

Even more apps were released, including various running apps to collect coins. Some apps were also released for its own season, including ones for Seasons 6 and 8.

== Licensed merchandise ==
=== Clothing ===
Various lines for Shopkins and Kindi Kids-inspired clothing for kids were made. T-shirts were also made to the Shopkins Direct subscription box. There were also accessories, bags, makeup, and other related content made available.

=== Cereal ===
In 2019, Kellogg's produced Shopkins themed cereal based on the playset-exclusive Cutie O's mini pack released during Season 12. Each cereal box features different play scenes, allowing people to collect all 5.

=== Books and magazines ===
Moose Toys partnered up with book publishers such as Scholastic and Simon and Schuster to launch a series of children's books featuring Shopkins such as Scholastic's Shopkins: Welcome to Shopville. Colouring and activity books were also available.

A series of Shopkins magazines were released in 2015 which is still ongoing and are exclusive to Australia and the UK. Shopkins were also featured on Redan's “Sparkle World” Magazine, which is aimed at 5-9-year-old girls, alongside other characters for girls including My Little Pony, Rainbow Magic, Barbie, Pinkalicious & Peterrific, L.O.L. Surprise!, and more. There is also Shopkins and Real Littles-related content found on the UK-exclusive “Cute” magazine, aimed at primary school girls, also alongside different characters such as Disney Princess, PINY: Institute of New York, My Little Pony: Pony Life and more.

=== Collector cards ===
Moose Toys released their first trading card set in 2015. Some packs often have other exclusive merchandise in them, such as necklaces and key-chains.

=== Kinstructions ===
Shopkins Kinstructions were a line of Shopkins building playsets licensed by Moose, inspired by Lego building toys, made by The Bridge Direct. Playsets also come with exclusive Shopkins, which are buildable, as well as extra pegs for regular Shopkins to stand on the playsets. The line was released in 2015.

=== McDonald's Happy Meal Toys ===
In December 2015, Moose Toys partnered up with McDonald's to release Happy Meal-exclusive Shopkins, mainly based on items found from the fashion department. The same toys were released in France in 2017, and later Mexico in 2018.

In January 2018, McDonald's released Happy Places themed furniture Shopkins toys based on one of their spin-off lines of the toys. The toys were later released in Southeast Asia.

In January 2019, McDonald's again released Shopkins-themed toys based on one of their spin-off lines, this time being the Cutie Cars line of toys. Each of the six cars in this line have two different variants, making it a set of 12 to collect. The toys were also released later in Mexico.

=== Shopkins Direct ===
From May 2017 to March 2018, Moose Toys partnered up with subscription box licensee, CultureFly, to promote Shopkins Direct, which was a subscription box with exclusive Shopkins accessories and merchandise, which was described as a quarterly/seasonal subscription service delivering accessories, apparel, and other exclusive merchandise featuring Shopkins characters. Box contents included Shopkins brand items such as plushies, lip balm, and limited-edition figures. (Additionally, exclusive Shopkins have been distributed via Shopkin pop-up chain stores located in North America.)

== Counterfeit Shopkins ==
Counterfeit Shopkins began to surface around mid-2015, including those with Funny Sweet or Shopkinsins on the packaging, which can refer to Shopkins in colors that Moose Toys never officially produced, such as Boo Hoo Onion being light blue and Chee Zee being orange. Arms and other parts might be broken, and paint could easily chip off. In response to this, Moose made an official video on the Shopkins official YouTube channel about how to spot counterfeit Shopkins. A number of sellers on websites offer counterfeit Shopkins that can include item pictures with Shopkins branding, most likely as a way to avoid the listing being taken away under intellectual property policies of the website and/or store.

=== Cases ===
Two factories in Yiwu producing counterfeit Shopkins toys were raided by local police in China in mid-2015, and Moose Toys stated that it will take legal action against anyone selling counterfeit Shopkins, which included a chain of Thriftway businesses selling counterfeit Shopkins.

== In popular culture ==
Shopkins served as inspiration for a design challenge on season 16 of Project Runway.

The Shoppies dolls, Jessicake, Bubbleisha and Peppa-Mint, along with some of the Season 6 playsets were featured in an episode of the adult animated stop motion sketch comedy TV series Robot Chicken.

Sacha Baron Cohen's character OMGWhizzBoyOMG!, in his satire series Who Is America?, unboxed Shopkins while interviewing political figures.

In 2019, there were videos featuring the Shoppies line of dolls, made using a popular app known as Gacha Life. A popular fandom on YouTube features the Shoppies doll, Jessicake, who is meant to be on the dark side.

The Real Littles series of Shopkins (Seasons/Series 12–14) gained popularity on social media platforms, such as TikTok and YouTube Shorts, with some unboxing videos of them gaining millions of views, alongside a similar toy brand, 5 Surprise Mini Brands, by Zuru.

== See also ==
- Moose Toys, the company that makes Shopkins
- The Trash Pack/The Grossery Gang, a similar toy line that the Shopkins line of toys was based on
- Enchantimals, a doll line inspired by the Shoppies dolls
- Cassandra Lee Morris, provides voice notably for Jessicake
- Erika Harlacher, provides voice for many characters in the Shopkins franchise, most notably Bubbleisha
