= Mighty Beanz =

Toy line

- Type: Toy
- Company: Moose Toys
- Availability: 2002–2006; 2010–2012; 2018–2019
- Materials: Plastic, metal
- Slogan: Play 'em, Race 'em, Collect 'em

Mighty Beanz was a range of collectable bean-shaped toys created by Moose Enterprises in Melbourne, Australia. The toys were first released in Australia in 2002, and were later released in the United States in 2003. The brand has since been relaunched twice: first in 2010, and again in 2018.

Each Mighty Bean is a plastic figure with a metal ball bearing inside, which causes it to wobble and move. Each toy is decorated with a humorous illustration of a person, animal, or fantasy character. The toy's concept was inspired by Mexican jumping beans.

Mighty Beanz was the first toy line from Moose Enterprises to gain widespread popularity in the United States. Moose would later introduce another line of collectible toys, Shopkins, which were marketed alongside Mighty Beanz.

== Description ==
A collection of Mighty Beanz, showing a range of designs on the toy's distinctive capsule shape.

Mighty Beanz were inspired by Mexican jumping beans, which are seed pods that appear to jump when held. Each Mighty Bean is a one-inch-tall, capsule-shaped plastic toy with a metal ball bearing inside of it. The weight of the ball bearing causes a Mighty Bean to wobble when handled. When placed on a tilted surface, a Mighty Bean will flip around.

The exterior of each Mighty Bean is decorated with an illustration of a humorous cartoon character on it. Most characters were grouped into different teams, such as "circus," "jungle," and "workers." The Toronto Star attributed the popularity of Mighty Beanz to the distinctive character designs, with collectors choosing their favorite characters and searching for rarer characters. Throughout the original run of Mighty Beanz, three characters were commonly used as the mascots of the brand: Cannonball Bean, Pop Star Bean, and Magical Wizard Bean. These characters appeared together in short animations to promote the toys.

Accessories and playsets were also released, including a line of Mighty Beanz racetracks. The packaging of Mighty Beanz offered ideas for different games to play with the Beanz. The primary Mighty Beanz game is to race the Beanz down different types of battle stages.

== History ==
=== Original line ===
The original line of Mighty Beanz was launched in Australia at the beginning of 2002. They were later released in the United States in summer 2003. Five series were created:

- "Series 1" included 60 characters (1–60) divided into teams of five, along with a red carrying case.
- "Series 2" included 70 characters (60–130). Again, these were divided into teams of five, with some beans able to glow in the dark. Blue carrying case.
- "Series 3" included 60 characters (131–190), divided into pairs. This series introduced color changing abilities, along with a green carrying case.
- "Series 4" included another 60 characters (191–250), divided into teams of three. In each team, one of the Beanz was a "Mega Bean," which was wider and taller than the standard Beanz. This series had a purple carrying case.
- "Series 5" was titled Mighty Beanz Bodz and included 60 characters (251–310), which each came with a rubber costume called a "Bod." This series was not divided into teams and did not have a carrying case.

In addition to the standard Mighty Beanz, a selection of rare, limited-edition Beanz were released. These Beanz were not categorized under any specific series but were instead grouped under "Rare Beanz" on the official Mighty Beanz website. Many of the rare designs (such as Albino Bean, Ghost Bean, and Medusa Bean) were produced in a limited quantity of 1,000 units.

Moose Enterprises also released three Mighty Beanz racetracks to go along with their toys: Ultimate Jump Park, Collision Chaos, and Super S-Bend. Each track came with two limited edition Race Beanz that did not have printed numbers on them. There were a total of six Race Beanz.

In 2004, a Mighty Beanz video game titled Mighty Beanz Pocket Puzzles was released for the Game Boy Advance. Each copy of the game came with one of five exclusive Gamer Beanz.

=== 2010 relaunch ===
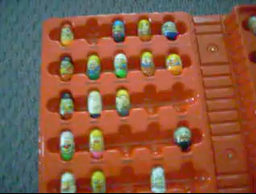
A collection of Mighty Beanz from 2011

2010 marked the first relaunch of Mighty Beanz. From 2010 to 2012, Moose released five new series of Mighty Beanz. Only the first three series were given a wide release in countries like the United States; series 4 and series 5 were only released in certain countries, including Australia. Each series contained a selection of regular characters (available through standard collectible packs) and special edition characters (available through spin-off products such as playsets and toy vehicles). Five series were created:

- "Series 1" included 100 regular characters and 16 special edition characters (1–116). The 100 regular characters were divided into teams of five. This series marked the return of the wider-shaped "Mega Beanz" from the original Series 4.
- "Series 2" included 100 regular characters and 19 special edition characters (117–235). Like the previous series, the 100 regular characters were divided into teams of five.
- "Series 3" included 110 regular characters and 64 special edition characters (236–409). The 110 regular characters were divided into teams of five. This series introduced Square Beanz. There were a total of 15 Square Beanz, including ten regular characters and five limited edition characters. Additionally, a set of Golden Square Beanz were released exclusively in Singapore. Collectors who found a Golden Square Bean were eligible to win up to S$10,000 cash.
- "Series 4" included 110 regular characters and 30 special edition characters (410–549). The 110 regular characters were divided into teams of five. Series 4 introduced two new kinds of Beanz: Triangle Beanz and Crystal Beanz. Crystal Beanz are regular Beanz with a clear plastic casing. There were a total of 15 Triangle Beanz, including ten regular Triangle Beanz and five limited edition Triangle Beanz.
- "Series 5" included 110 regular characters and 44 special edition characters (550–703). The 110 regular characters were divided into teams of five. This series introduced Mini Beanz and Disc Beanz. Mini Beanz are a smaller and shorter version of a regular sized bean, which replaced Mega Beanz for this series. Disc Beanz are circular beans with flat sides. There were a total of 15 Disc Beanz, including ten regular Disc Beanz and five limited edition Disc Beanz. The limited edition Disc Beanz were produced in different quantities: three of them had 500 of each made, one had 250 made, and the last one only had 100 made.

Each series of the relaunched Mighty Beanz also had their own limited edition Moose Bean, with only 1,000 of them made for each series.

=== 2018 relaunch ===
Moose developed a new line of Mighty Beanz, starting with 140 new Beanz which were released on September 1, 2018. A line of Fortnite-themed Mighty Beanz were produced. An Easter series and Series 2 of the main line were released in early 2019.

- "Series 1" included 140 Beanz (1–140) divided into teams of five. Beginning with this series, every bean is shaped like a Mega Bean. Series 1 included special Beanz such as Two Faced Beanz, Golden Beanz and limited edition Golden Hero Beanz. Each of the five Golden Hero Beanz were limited to 10,000 a piece, making them easier to collect compared to past limited edition Beanz.
- "Series 2" included 140 Beanz (141–280) divided into teams of five. Series 2 introduced different finishes that were applied to the Beanz such as Speckled, Frosty, Metallic and Glowin' Beanz. Golden Beanz made a return, along with limited edition Golden Royal Beanz. Each of the five Golden Royal Beanz were once again limited to 10,000 apiece.

== Reception ==
The original 2002 line of Mighty Beanz was Moose's first toy line to become internationally popular. The New York Times reported that Mighty Beanz were the most popular toy release of 2002 in Australia, Britain, and Italy. In 2003, Mighty Beanz was nominated for Activity Toy of the Year by the Toy Association. 6.5 million Mighty Beanz were sold from 2002 to 2003.

Spin Master, which distributed the toys in North America, received reports that Mighty Beanz were banned from classrooms at the height of their popularity in the USA.
