= List of Ultimate Muscle characters =

The following is a list of characters who appear in Yudetamago's manga and anime series Ultimate Muscle/Kinnikuman Nisei.

== Prologue of a Legend~Hercules Factory Arc ==
Mantaro Muscle

Mantaro Kinniku (キン肉万太郎 Kinniku Mantarō) / Mantaro Kinnikuman/Mantaro Muscle (Kid Muscle)
Voiced by: Masaya Onosaka/Marc Thompson (US). Homeland: Planet Kinniku, Age: 14 (Choujin Olympics: 15, Ultimate Tag: 16), Height: 176cm/5'9", Weight: 83kg/189lbs., Chojin Power: 930,000. The main character of the story. He is the 59th prince of Planet Muscle (Planet Kinniku) and son the first Kinnikuman, Suguru Muscle and Belinda/Bibinba. Raised during times of peace, he is a spoiled, cowardly, lazy teenager, much like his father was at the beginning of the first series except with more emphasis on cowardice and less on clumsiness. He usually start matches off in a cowardly state, only managing to get a few good moves in due to luck. However, when his friends are in trouble or his opponent is being dishonorable, he manages to reach the state of Kajiba no Kuso Djikara (Burning Inner Strength). When this happens, the Niku-Mark appears on his forehead and his strength, stamina, and technique increase many fold. Because Suguru had his records annulled years ago, Mantaro never knew how great a hero his father really was until he met Alexandria Meat. Mantaro was named after Ultraman Taro (Ultraman + Taro/Kinniku + Mantaro). Mantaro's favorite wrestling move is his father's signature move, the Kinniku Buster (sometimes called the Butt Buster in the English dub, though it actually translates to Muscle Buster) which he won much of his wrestling matches with until he gains his own signature move, Muscle Millennium. Mantaro is rather lecherous and lusts after many girls, but his main love interest is Roxanne. His favorite food is galbi bowl (Beef and Rice), which he often sings about.
In the Japanese version of the anime, Mantaro has a habit of adding Muscle (マッスル, Massuru) at the end of certain words and sentences in place of the standard masu (ます). For example, Itadaki-masu (いただきます), a common Japanese phrase said before eating, becomes Itadaki-MUSCLE (いただきマッスル, Itadaki Massuru).
Terry the Kid (テリー・ザ・キッド Te-ri Za Kiddo) / Terry "The Grand" Kenyon
Voiced by: Toshiyuki Morikawa, Ai Nonaka (young)/Frank Frankson (US). Height: 180cm/5'10", Weight: 86kg/191.1lbs, Choujin Power: 1,050,000. Terry is the son of the Texas wrestler Legend, Terryman and Natsuko Shōno, a Japanese reporter. Kid always believed that Suguru Muscle stole the fame from his father, and held a grudge against the Muscles because of it, saying that he will come in first place to Mantaro Muscle and prove that his family is better. He even hated his father because of all this, and always said that he is nothing like him. After he learns about the power of friendship, he changes his ways and becomes best friends with Mantaro, but he still works independently now and then. Kid has a soft spot for many things, and is always willing to support his team. He even gave up the Chojin Olympics to save a little boy from drowning. Even though his family's moves aren't much of a powerhouse as others, he is still able to do critical damage on his opponent by using technical wrestling and submission holds. Oddly whilst he always wanted to differ himself from his father, he has not once tried utilizing the improved versions of his family's traditional techniques thought up by Scarface for his future matches.
Like Terryman, he will sometimes refer to others as You (ユー, Yū) and himself in the first person as Me (ミー, Mī). As his father was frequently referred to as Terry (テリー, Terī) in the original series, Terry the Kid is usually referred to as Kid (キッド, Kiddo) in order to differentiate the two of them.
Seiuchin (セイウチン Seiuchin) / Wally Tusket
Voiced by: Takumi Yamazaki (Ginzō Matsuo in first movie)/Madeline Blaustein (US). Height: 173cm/5'7/", Weight: 145kg/322.2lbs, Choujin Power: 910,000. A big Irish walrus (seiuchi is Japanese for walrus). A walrus Chojin, Wally is the friendlier and easygoing member of the New Generation. He greatly admires Mantaro Muscle, and in many ways is a lot like him, the two of them always being hungry and seen eating food all the time. Wally cares greatly for his family, who often come to watch his matches. He is the Number 2 student of the Hercules Factory First Years and has a lot of heart and spirit, but his kind and gentle personality can lead to weaknesses in the ring. He is originally assigned to defend Hokkaido, an area in Japan best fitted for Wally's environment. In the current story arc, Wally has grown sick of Mantaro's numerous thoughtless remarks about him and leaves the Seigi Chojin side to form the Hell Expansions with Neptuneman. Neptuneman awakens Wally's ferocious animal instinct, transforming him into a blood thirsty beast. Ever since, Wally has appeared as an enemy of Mantaro and the others.
In the Japanese version, Seiuchin refers to himself in the first person as Ora (オラ) instead of the more common Ore (オレ). He refers to Mantaro as Aniki (アニキ), a term of respect for (in this case) someone considered a brother.
Gazelleman (ガゼルマン Gazeruman) / Dik-Dik Van-Dik
Voiced by: Yasunori Masutani/Eric Stuart (US). Height: 193cm/6'4", Weight: 136kg/302.2lbs, Chojin Power: 1,000,000. A Tanzanian gazelle-type wrestler. Dik-Dik started out as being ranked #1 in the Hercules Factory Graduates, being quite skilled in battle and very handsome. He was originally assigned to protect Tokyo, Japan with Mantaro Muscle. Though being the highest graduate, Dik-Dik is known for losing pretty much all of his battles miserably against any opponent, and eventually becomes comedy relief who chooses not to always support Mantaro, who he usually sees as a lazy. His role is more prominent in the anime than the original manga, where he had more appearances along with other supporting characters who also appear more so in the anime. Though Dik-Dik has made his role somewhat of a loser after a while, he does have his spotlights throughout the series, being there for his teammates and giving support in their fights. His known trademark technique is Antler Fist, an attack where he places a glove with antlers on them onto his right fist and leaps into the air, sending a powerful fist into his opponent plus his ultimate move the savannah heat. His English name is a reference to the dik-dik and to the actor Dick Van Dyke.

Gorgeousman (ゴージャスマン Gōjasu Man)
Voiced by: Mahito Ohba. A native of Houston, Texas. Height: 190cm, Weight: 185kg, Choujin Power: 870,000. Gorgeousman was heavily censored by 4Kids Entertainment due to his costume's resemblance to a giant Confederate States of America flag. In the original manga version of Nisei, when the Legends first announce the Hercules Factory graduates, Mantaro steals Gorgeousman's costume and wears it, saying that Gorgeousman's costume is much cooler than his. An almost nude Gorgeousman appears shortly after, forcing Mantaro to return his clothing. His forearms were horribly injured by Check Mate, but he recovered. He was featured briefly in the first Nise movie, but lost in an off-screen fight against The Cyborg. Trademark Technique:Patriot Shooter Press. He first appears as a fan submission on the cover art for chapter 374 of the original Kinnikuman.
The Adams (ジ・アダムス Ji Adamusu) / Ski Adams
Voiced by: Kenji Nomura/ (US). Height: 184cm/6'0/", Weight: 115kg/253lbs, Choujin Power: 850,000. A UFO themed Chojin from California. He is named after George Adamski. Ranked Number Four in the Hercules Factory. He was originally assigned to the Tohoku region. Early in the manga version, The Adams served a larger role as a supportive character for Mantaro, and remained faithful to the young prince. He later joins Mantaro, the Kid, Gazelle, and Seiu in their battle against Kevin Mask and his team. After the DMP was defeated, he returns to his post and joins the other second generations to train at the Ryogoku National Martial Arts Stadium, where he spars with Apollonman. He later makes an appearance to witness HF Second Year Replacement matches. He was also featured briefly in the first Nisei movie, during the Seigi Chojin fan appreciation day, where he is seen giving fans his autograph. Later on he helps out in the fight against The Cyborg, but is easily defeated.
Trademark Technique: UFO Clutch. He first appears as a fan submission on the cover art for chapter 374 of the original Kinnikuman.
Apollonman (アポロンマン Aporonman) / Apollo (Mercury)
Voiced by: Yūki Satō. Height: 185cm/6', Weight: 120kg/264lbs, Choujin Power: 870,000. A Greek Chojin obviously inspired by the god Apollo. Assigned to the Kantō region. Early in the manga version, he serves a larger role as a supportive character for Mantaro. After the defeat of the DMP, Apollo returns to Hercules with The Adams and Gorgeousman to continue training. He was featured briefly in the first Nisei movie, where he is signing autographs during a fan appreciation day. He later joins the other Seigi Chojins to fight The Cyborg, but is easily taken down. Trademark Techniques:Pancrush. He first appears as a fan submission on the cover art for chapter 374 of the original Kinnikuman.
Barbarian (バーバリアン Bābarian)
Voiced by: Takumi Yamazaki. Height: 200cm/6'6", Weight: 120kg/264lbs, Choujin Power: 800,000. A Kenyan Chojin assigned to the Chūbu region. He was killed by Tyrannoclaw after attempting to attack him from behind and ended up being eaten. In the dub, Barbarian was injured. He was also shown briefly in the first movie, where he was signing autographs, and joins the team to battle The Cyborg, but is quickly taken down. Trademark Technique:Barbarian Crush. He first appears as a fan submission on the cover art for chapter 374 of the original Kinnikuman as Animal Man. He also appeared in Yudetamago's manga Lion Heart as Brash Bird.
Canadian Boy (カナディアン・ボーイ Kanadian Bōi) / The Canuckler
Voiced by: Mahito Ohba. Son of Canadian legend Canadianman.
Specialman Jr. (スペシャルマンJr. Supesharuman Juniā)
Voiced by: Yasunori Masutani. Son of American legend Special Man. Anaconda impersonated him to infiltrate the Hercules Factory. It's unclear what happened to the real Specialman Jr or if he existed at all. Some fans say he does exist, and rumors say that Specialman Jr is still training to become a champion.
Jairo (ジャイロ Jairo) / Gyro
Height: 193cm/6'3", Weight: 102kg/225lbs, Choujin Power: 910,000. An Australian Chojin in charge of the Chūgoku region. He was killed by Bone Cold. He also appeared in the first Nisei movie, getting easily defeated by The Cyborg.
Namul (ナムル Namuru)
Height: 185cm/6'1", Weight: 98kg/216lbs, Choujin Power: 860,000. A Korean Chojin who is assigned to Shikoku. Named after namul. He also appeared in the first Nisei movie, where he is seen signing autographs and shaking hands with many fans. He later joins the Seigi Chojin in their battle against the Cyborg.
Pantomimer (パントマイマー Pantomaimā)
A Spanish pantomime Chojin. Height: 190cm/6'3", Weight: 91kg/201lbs. Trademark Technique: Madrid Illusion. He first appears as a fan submission on the cover art for chapter 374 of the original Kinnikuman.
Samuu (サムゥ Samū)
Voiced by: Tetsu Inada. A wrestler from India. Height: 170cm/6'7", Weight: 95kg/209lbs. He lost to Ramenman on his final wrestling test and failed to graduate. Trademark Technique: Body Press. He first appears as a fan submission on the cover art for chapter 374 of the original Kinnikuman as Killer Arabian.
Jigokuman (地獄マン) / Hellman
A skull-masked chojin. Failed to graduate.
The Jack (ザ・ジャック Za Jakku)
A chojin with a Union Flag mask. Failed to graduate.

== Legends (Original Muscle League) ==
The veteran heroes from the previous series "Kinnikuman" are referred to as legends here. They have paved the way for the future generation and have come forth to train the next generation of seigi chojin.

King Muscle

Meat

Robin Mask

Terryman

Ramenman

Buffaloman

Warsman / Croe (Lord Flash) / Belmond

Brocken Jr.

Canadianman / Manitoban

Geronimo / Beetlebomb

Neptuneman / King Neptune

Wolfman / Sosumi

Sunshine (サンシャイン)

Kinkotsuman / Skullduggery

Harabote Muscle / Vance McMadd

Mayumi Kinniku / Grampa Muscle

Bibimba / Belinda

The Ninja / Ninja Ned

Kinnikuman Soldier/Sargent Muscle/Sargent Kinniku

Halfway through the Fire Challenge arc, Ataru's name is changed to 'Sargent Kinnikuman.'

Kani Base / Buster Crab
Voiced by: Eiji Takemoto/Madeleine Blaustein (US). A Crab chojin defeated by Sugaru Kinnikuman in Rock-Paper-Scissors. Surgically altered himself to be more competitive in Rock-Paper-Scissors and lost to Mantaro in the first elimination round of the Chojin Crown in a game of "Look That Way."
Teapack man/Tea Pac
Curry Cook
Voiced by: Yasunori Masutani
Jesse Maivia

King Cobra
Chienowaman/Mindpuzzler
Pentagon/Starface

Springman
A former minion of Buffaloman's from his Akuma Choujin days. He and Buffaloman search for information on why Ashuraman reverted back to his evil ways.
Kazuo "Aderans" Nakano (Doc Nakano)
Announcer Yoshigai / Mac Metaphor
Voiced by: Mahito Ohba/Eric Stuart (US). Wherever there's a wrestling match, Yoshigai is there as the Play-by-play announcer.

== dMp Arc ==
Kevin Mask (ケビン・マスク Kebin Masuku) or (けひん. ますく Kehin Masuku)
Voiced by: Ryotaro Okiayu/Ted Lewis (US). Homeland: England, Age: 18 (Choujin Olympics: 19, Ultimate Tag: 20), Height: 218cm/7'2", Weight: 155kg/342lbs, Choujin Power: 1,170,000. He is the son of British super-wrestler Robin Mask and Alisa Mackintosh. He hated his father's strict upbringing, so he ran away when he was 8 and joined the d.M.p (although their relationship has gotten better since the Chōjin Olympics). He refers to his father as Daddy (ダディ). During Mantaro Kinniku's first two matches on Earth, he showed that he cared deeply about honour and that he had a soft spot inside him which was rarely shown. He is sometimes known as 'every girl's knight in shining armour' this was particularly because of his mask which was a bluish-grey knight-like helmet. Kevin's English accent is one of the traits that girls find attractive about him. On his back is a Spider Nest Tattoo which was added during his Akugyō Chōjin days. The image of each Chōjin he defeats is added to the tattoo. This continues even after he leaves the d.M.p. Kevin also possesses his own version of the Kinniku Clan's Kajiba no Kuso Djikara called Maelstrom Power. The name Kevin Mask is a play on a major wrestling star Kevin Nash. Trademark Techniques: Big Ben Bash, Phoenix Adrenaline {Untypical Tornado Type, Inferno Incancerator Type}, Tower Bridge, Robin Special, Mach Pulverizer, Provocation Toe Kick, Royal Stretch, Tornado Fisherman's Suplex.
Tel-Tel Boy (テルテル・ボーイ Teru Teru Bōi) / Dialbolic
Voiced by: Tomohiro Nishimura/Eric Stuart (US). A walking, talking cell phone from Hong Kong. He is Mantarou's debut match opponent and his weakness is water and other liquids. When he was up against Mantaro, rain devastated him and his phone lines cut off from the tournament which resulted a lead to Mantaro's victory. His name comes from teru teru bozu, a doll made from a tied up piece of cloth that ensures skies stay clear and rain doesn't fall.
Ricardo (ヒカルド Hikarudo) / Ricardo

Height 189 cm./6' 1,5'. Is the real head of D.M.P. Brazilian by birth, Ricardo is a great fighter and has an enviable technique, especially for his finishing move, the Brazilian headknock, which killed before his master Pashango, who had discovered that Ricardo was a member of the DMP. He enrolled in the tournament so Chojin and manages to defeat Sly-SKRAPER and Jeager, revealing to the general public as the true head of the DMP and the last one left. After this challenge Kid that is put into serious difficulty by Ricardo since he can not even use the Muscle Millennium because the Brazilian cut all the ropes of the ring. When all seems lost, with the strength of the friendship of Jaeger, who asked Kid to avenge him he succeeded he beat him with his Muscle Millenium and to get to the finals where he will meet Kevin Mask. During the tournament goes to great lengths to make themselves believe the Muscle League, but the trick does not work.

MAXman (マックスマン Makkusu Man) / Pumpinator
Voiced by: Tetsu Inada/Dan Green (US). The grandson of Sneagator (Shocadile), an old-generation Akuma Choujin that was defeated by Mantaro's father. He can transform into a giant athletic shoe. Mantaro figures out that a shoe's worst enemy is stepping in feces, while in the English dub, Kid Muscle had an alien from Planet Kinniku called a Stinkbug.
Rex King (レックス・キング Rekkusu Kingu) / Tyrannoclaw
Voiced by: Shinichiro Ohta/Marc Thompson (US). One of Sunshine's star pupils, Rex King is from the United States. His right arm is actually a Tyrannosaurus head and neck, known as the Jurassic Hand (ジュラシックハンド). In truth, he is actually a dinosaur and his "Jurassic Hand" is his real head and what appears to be his "head" is a fake and it only stores his brain. After fighting Terry for a while, he was put into a strangle hold that started fossilizing his Dinosaur hand. He pummeled Terry the Kid with his brutal attacks, but Mantaro helped out Terry by telling chillingly bad jokes (coldness being a dinosaur's weakness) and ended up having his head crushed to bits by Terry's finishing move. He bears a resemblance to Beast Wars' Megatron.
Check Mate (チェックメイト Chekkumeito)
Voiced by: Kouichi Toochika/Wayne Grayson (US). Height: 191cm/6'3", Weight: 190-800kg/422.2-1777.78lbs, Choujin Power: 1,210,000. An Akugyo Chojin from Monaco trained by Sunshine. At first he's a sadist that's incapable of feeling pain, this is however his greatest weakness as his body does take damage, he simply cannot feel it. But ironically after being bested by Mantaro (Who he dared thought wasn't much of a challenge yet didn't even react swiftly to him countering his ultimate move), he turns over a new leaf by becoming a New Generation Seigi Chojin as a way to apologize for every horrendous thing he's said & done during his match with him. He has also greatly learned his lesson in being more cautious with his body & now tends to dodge certain attacks instead of arrogantly taking all of them head on. In the Ultimate Choujin Tag Arc he turned down Seiuchin's offer to form a tag team. Because of this, he became the first victim of Seiuchin and Neptuneman's Optical Fiber Cross Bomber, resulting in the skin on his face being peeled off. His attacks are modeled after chess pieces for King, Knight, and Rook. He can fuse them and his normal form together in a technique known as Grand Slam. When Reborn Ashuraman and the Demon Seed separate Meat's body in order to revive General Terror, Check Mate joins forces with Jade to help Kevin Mask train for his match against Voltman. Trademark Techniques: Chess Piece Change, Stallion Style Honorable Driver, Centaur Black Neigh, Rook Sky Twister.

Bone Killer (ボーン・キラー Bōn Kirā) / Addversarious
Voiced by: Norio Wakamoto/Eric Stuart (US). Height: 197cm, Weight: 148kg, Chōjin Power: 1,230,000. Mantaro's first opponent. A dMp agent from Peru who is one of the dMp's best Chojins. Can extend the cross/plus symbol on his chest outward to crush enemies. In the anime he was called Blood Killer, so as not to be confused with Bone Cold. Trademark Technique: Bone Crush Cross. He first appears as a fan submission on the cover art for chapter 374 of the original Kinnikuman as Wizardman.
Anaconda (アナコンダ Anakonda) / Boaconda
Voiced by: Tetsu Inada/Jimmy Zoppi (US). Length: 560cm, Weight: 900kg, Chōjin Power: 1,090,000. Mantaro's second opponent who is one of the dMp's best Chojins. He impersonated Special Man Jr. and fought Mantaro in a caged death match at the Hercules Factory. If it wasn't for Terry the Kid throwing peanuts at Anaconda, Mantaro wouldn't have defeated him. From India. He first appears as a fan submission on the cover art for chapter 374 of the original Kinnikuman as Snaker King. Trademark Techniques: Witch's Whipping Humiliation (魔女鞭の嬲打ち, Majo-muchi no Naburi-uchi)、Serpent's Constricting Coils (蛇銅監禁囲い, Jadō Kankin Gakoi)
Kirinman (麒麟男) / Doomsmane
Voiced by: Takumi Yamazaki. Height: 190cm, Weight: 202kg, Chōjin Power: 79,000,000. A Chinese Qilin and head of the dMp Perfect Chōjin. He and Shimaō were taking some of Sunshine's students to add to theirs. They were destroyed when Sunshine blew up their HQ. He first appears as a fan submission on the cover art for chapter 374 of the original Kinnikuman. Trademark Techniques: Thousand Li Kick, Sì Líng Punch
Shimaō (屍魔王 Corpse Devil) / Skulldozer
Voiced by: Yasunori Masutani. Height: 189cm, Weight: 102kg, Chōjin Power: 68,000,000. The demon-like head of the dMp Zangyaku Chōjin and its co-founder. He and Kirinman were taking some of Sunshine's students to add to theirs. They were destroyed when Sunshine blew up their HQ. He first appears as a fan submission on the cover art for chapter 374 of the original Kinnikuman. Trademark Technique: Devil Initiation.
Yashamu (夜叉夢)
Height: 175cm, Weight: 95kg, Chōjin Power: 1,200,000. A Japanese Yaksha-themed villain. Killed by Gazelleman in the V-Jump manga. He first appears as a fan submission on the cover art for chapter 374 of the original Kinnikuman. Trademark Technique: Kagamijishi Guruma (鏡獅子車).
The Flowerdust (ザ・フラワーダスト)
Height: 200cm, Weight: 152kg, Chōjin Power: 36,000,000. A big flower from the Netherlands. Presumably he died in the dMp explosion. He first appears as a fan submission on the cover art for chapter 374 of the original Kinnikuman. Trademark Technique: Poisonous Petals (毒毒花弁).
Unibōzu (ウニボーズ)
A dMp sea urchin chōjin. His name is a parody of the umibōzu. First appeared in chapter 14 of Nisei as a fan submission.
The Cutter Maō (ザ・カッター魔王 The Cutter Devil)
A dMp Akugyō Chōjin that carries a giant box cutter as a weapon. He later represents Libya in the Chōjin Olympics. First appeared in chapter 14 of Nisei as a fan submission.

== HF Second Year Replacement Matches Arc ==
Jade (ジェイド Jeido) / Jeager (anime only)
Voiced by: Kenji Nojima, Fumiko Orikasa (young)/Wayne Grayson (US). Height: 187cm/6'1", Weight: 93kg/206.67lbs, Choujin Power: 950,000. Brocken Jr.'s German pupil, first introduced as a member of Generation EX. His nickname is "Berlin's Green Arrow", as he wears a green uniform and bicyclist's helmet. An orphan, he was raised by an elderly couple, who were subsequently slain by a trio of anti-superhuman thugs. This incident was what inspired Jade to seek Brocken's guidance in becoming a champion for those unable to defend themselves. (In the English dub of the anime, he is later revealed to be Brocken's son, though this is not the case in the English manga.) Jade's ultimate attack is Brocken's "The Red Rain of Pain" (a.k.a. "Red Rain of Berlin", a chop-like attack capable of cutting right through a superhuman's body). According to Brocken, it works on the principle of "cutting the flesh to cut the meat, cutting the meat to cut the bone, cutting the bone to cut the core". However, Jade's version differs from Brocken's in that Jade actually causes a blade to protrude from his hand before slashing, and his hand/arm is usually engulfed in flames before he delivers the attack. Jade's second favourite move is the "Beefcake Hammer", where he shifts behind the opponent, raises one of his opponent's legs and crosses the opponent's arms around it before executing a leaping suplex. In a grueling concrete deathmatch, Jade is defeated by Scarface in Maui, Hawaii, and fails to enter the finals. Though Scarface twists off Jade's right arm, it is later reattached. He later participates in the Chojin Crown. Unfortunately, he suffers another defeat, this time to yet another dMp member in disguise; Ricardo.
Scarface (Mars) (スカーフェイス Sukāfeisu / マルス Marusu) / Eskara (anime only)
Voiced by: Kenji Nomura/Marc Thompson (US). An Italian dMp that infiltrated the Hercules Factory under the guise of a mafia bruiser. In his match with Terry the Kid, he ended up using parts of the ring to attack Terry the Kid until the official got him to stop. When his true appearance is revealed, Scarface manages to defeat Terry the Kid. His real name is Mars (マルス). He is an Akugyo Choujin who poses as a Seigi Choujin and enrolls in the Hercules Factory after the destruction of the d.M.p Headquarters. He is a master of psychological warfare and is well-studied in Choujin Wrestling techniques and their weaknesses. He has long-standing relationship with Kevin Mask, having saved his life at one point during their d.M.p training days. After his loss to Mantaro, he disappears for a while, returning during the Demon Seed Arc as an Idol Choujin. However, his Akugyo Choujin side resurfaces during the Ultimate Choujin Tag Arc when, while initially joining the Idols to save Kevin Mask, he soon changes his plot to stealing the Completion Bulbs in order to restart the d.M.p.
Clioneman (クリオネマン Kurioneman) / Hydrozoa
Voiced by: Takuro Takahashi/Dan Green (US). A Chojin based on a clione from Russia. Hydrozoa can transform his body into several things, including a giant squid, a jellyfish, and a magnifying glass to use the sun's rays to create a deadly laser-type weapon. Hydrozoa's special move is the XYZ Crash, named so because XYZ are the last letters of the English alphabet, meaning that his matches end once he hits the move. He savagely defeated Wally Tusket in his match, but was beaten by Mantaro in the second round. His trademark moves are Solar Energy Heat and XYZ Crush.
Dead Signal (デッド・シグナル Deddo Shigunaru) / Road Rage
Voiced by: Tetsu Inada/Sebastian Arcelus (US). A living Traffic light from Japan. He can control his opponents movements by using various roads signs. Dead Signal's special move is the Sign Rotary Saw where the sign that makes up his head spins around like a buzzsaw blade to slice into his opponent. He was defeated by Mantaro in the first round of the Replacement Tournament (also the only member of Generation EX to lose in the first round). In the rom hack of Kinnikuman Tag Match Road Rage is a playable character. He is the first Generation Ex member Kid Muscle fights. Road Rage has powers similar to that of Dialbolic, causing hallucinations in his opponents. Road Rage manipulates his opponents by changing the various road signs in his facial area, causing his opponents to Stop, Turn Right, or get hit by Falling Rocks. Road Rage is also able to manipulate items from outside of the ring to hit his opponents with when under the illusion of a train coming or rocks falling. Mantaro defeats Road Rage when he accidentally draws a sign on the ring mat that Road Rage is forced to follow. Kid Muscle uses this law-abiding to defeat Road Rage, the only member of Gen Ex to be defeated in the first round of the elimination tournament.
Rinko Nikaidō (二階堂凛子 Nikaidō Rinko) / Roxanne
Voiced by: Fumiko Orikasa/Lisa Ortiz (US). Birthdate: September 9. Roxanne is the adopted daughter of Mari Nikaidō and is Mantaro's love interest. She attends Shirabara (白薔薇) Private High School, Class 2-A. In the original manga she is a kogal and debuts after the Hercules Factory Second Year Replacement Matches, but in the anime she is a more wholesome high school girl who loves wrestling and first appears during the Tel Tel Boy fight. Her two best friends are Keiko and Tamaki (Kiki and Trixie in the anime versions) and they are almost always seen with her, although lately they have been fading into the background and she has been spending more time with Jacqueline. Although she occasionally seems more interested in Jade or Chaos, she is generally considered Mantaro's girlfriend however it is possible that she has a crush on mantaro.
Keiko (恵子 Keiko) / Kiki (anime only)
Voiced by: Ai Nonaka/Kerry Williams (US). A friend of Roxanne's that was bullied in school. In the manga, she is bullied by Tamaki in school, and almost ended up dating The Rigani for money so she could pay off the bullies. Roxanne steps in to stop her, which leads to The Rigani fighting Mantaro Muscle. In the anime, she appears with Roxanne and Trixie (as Tamaki is known in the anime) during the Tel Tel Boy fight, and in the same episode, Mantaro mistakes Roxanne calling out to Kiki (as Keiko is known in the anime) as cheering. During Mantaro's fight with Check Mate, Keiko realizes the one vote called in for Mantaro was by Rinko, which Rinko denied. Along with Roxanne and Tamaki, Keiko cheers on Team AHO for the majority of the anime and manga. She is the second hostage up for grabs in the Poison Six Pack saga, and she is saved by Dik-Dik Van-Dik and Wally Tusket, with Seiuchin catching her.
Tamaki Maekawa (前川たまき Maekawa Tamaki) / Trixie (anime only)
Voiced by: Reiko Kiuchi/Megan Hollingshead (US). A ganguro kogal that bullied Keiko, she later befriends Roxanne and Keiko. In the manga, she is a ganguro kogal that bullied Keiko in school, but later had a change of heart after The Rigani kidnapped Roxanne. In the anime, she appears along with Roxanne and Keiko during the Tel Tel Boy fight. Along with her two friends, Tamaki cheers on Team AHO for the majority of the anime and manga. She is the love interest of Terry the Kid. She is the first hostage up for grabs in the Poison Six Pack saga, and is saved Terry the Kid and Jade, with Kid catching her.
Suzy
Voiced by: Kimiko Saitō, Wally's mother.
Dorothy
Voiced by: Ryō Hirohashi/Fumiko Orikasa, Wally's little sister who admires Mantaro.
The Rigany (THE・リガニー Za Riganī) / Cranky Doodle Craw Daddy
Voiced by: Takumi Yamazaki/Ted Lewis (US). An American crawfish wrestler from New Orleans and one of a few remnants of the dMp. Under the name "Masakazu Tamura", he would put on a human disguise and appear at singles bars. Kiki agreed to compensated dating with him, but Roxanne stepped in and saved her. He captured Roxanne and Mantaro had to fight him. ("The Rigany" is a Japanese pun on Zarigani, the Japanese word for crawfish. His trademark technique is the Shell Stop, and other attacks include Tail Slap and Leg Launch.

== Kajiba no Kuso Djikara Challenge Arc ==
Mince / Minch (ミンチ)
Voiced by: Naoki Tatsuta/Darren Dunstan (US). Chief of the Churrasco Tribe. He is Meat's long-lost father.
Fork the Giant (フォーク・ザ・ジャイアント) / Forkolossus
Voiced by: Toshiyuki Morikawa/Frank Frankson (US). No Respect No. 1. A murderous, living forklift truck from planet Doboku. His first victim was a nagging boss. Relies on the power of hatred. Loses his hands (injury self-inflicted). He was inspired by a DC villain named Steamroller from Teen Titans. Mantaro ends up fighting him on a prison island.
Hanzō (ハンゾウ)
Voiced by: Kazuya Nakai/Eric Stuart (US). One of the No Respect (ノーリスペクト) trio, Hanzou hails from Planet IGA (惑星IGA,, Wakusei IGA), which neighbours Planet Kinniku. On Planet IGA, Hanzo managed to defeat The Ninja before facing Mantarou Kinniku. Touched by Mantarou Kinniku's kindness, he reforms after their match and reappears as an Idol Choujin during the Demon Seed Arc. He returns as an Idol Choujin during the Demon Seed Arc and fights Gepparland. After defeating Gepparland they are both killed by General Terror, but Hanzou is later revived by the Reborn Diamond. He has yet to make an appearance during the Ultimate Tag arc. Techniques:Mount Fuji Facelift, Oklahoma Stampede.
Bone Cold (ボーン・コールド)
Voiced by: Nobuyuki Hiyama/Sean Schemmel (US). Height: 204cm/6'8" Weight: 147kg/326.6 lbs. No Respect No. 3. Lone Bone Cold is the most powerful member of No Respect (ノーリスペクト) and the son of Kinkotsuman. As a child, he ran away from home in order to escape his father's abuse (harsh training in the anime). He becomes a hitman who specializes in Seigi Choujins. He teamed up with Hanzou and Fork the Giant to form No Respect. On Planet Kinniku, he has killed 152 soldiers and while this is considerably lower than Hanzo and Fork's body count, he is still considered the strongest and cruelest of the three, the reason why his was lowest was because he does not kill anyone unless he is paid for it, the 152 he killed were all important officers with bounties on their heads. Mantaro fought him near a vacation resort where Bone Cold captured Minch. After Minch was killed by Bone Cold, Mantaro managed to defeat Bone Cold with Kinkotsuman making ammeds to Bone Cold. Special moves include Shooting Arrow, 3-D Crush and Nasty Gimlet.
Kokumo (コクモ)
Voiced by: Yasunori Masutani. The Ninja's student who was killed by Hanzou.

== The Poison Six Pack (Anime Only) ==
These characters appeared only in the second movie and as filler in the anime television series.

Puri-Puri Man (プリプリマン) / Monsieur Cheeks
Voiced by: Ryotaro Okiayu – Monsieur Cheeks reappears during the Poison Six Pack arc of Kinnikuman: Nisei after becoming a Rear Admiral in the French navy, becoming a French citizen in the process. He and Mr. French face off against Wally Tusket and Dik-dik van Dik for Trixie's freedom. Though M. Cheeks starts out strong, Dikdik gains the upper hand by slapping his face in a simulation of a spanking. M. Cheeks is defeated by a combination of Checkmate's interference by executing a Pile Driver Stallion Style and Dikdik van Dik's Savanna Heat. After his defeat, M. Cheeks became an Idol Choujin and provided the recaps of the previous episodes during the third season of Ultimate Muscle, finishing each recap with an exclamation of "Let's get to the bottom of it!"
Baron Maximilian (バロン・マクシミリアン)
Voiced by: Hozumi Gouda, Kenji Nomura (TV)/Pete Zarustica→Marc Thompson (US). The Leader of the Poison Pack is a caped baron that fought Mantaro. He moves very fast and has two incarnations that he can become: Maximum Maximilian and Maximilian Overdrive. He is a hidden creatable character in Kinnikuman-Nisei:Legends VS New Generations.
The Saiborg (ザ・犀暴愚) / Jagg-Ed
Voiced by: Akio Ōtsuka, Hisao Egawa (TV)/Eric Stuart (US). A Central African rhinoceros cyborg with spiky armor. First appears as the bad guy in the first movie. He takes a hostage and forces Mantaro into a match on the Tokyo Tower. The ateji used to spell "Cyborg" mean "Foolish Violent Rhinoceros". In the English version, he talks with a Rocky Balboa-like accent. He first appears as a fan submission on the cover art for chapter 374 of the original Kinnikuman.
El Kaerun (エル・カエルーン) / Mister French
Voiced by: Yasuhiro Takato/Wayne Grayson (US). An amphibious Chōjin with the body of a frog (kaeru means frog). His unfair techniques included throwing Seiuchin's family into a pool covered with sticky saliva and attacking with his long tongue from behind the ropes of the ring. He is a hidden creatable character in Kinnikuman-Nisei:Legends VS New Generations.
Dazzle (ダズル) / Dazz-Ling
Voiced by: Bin Shimada, Dai Matsumoto (TV)/Wayne Grayson (US). Dazzle is a demonic character with a Jamaican accent. He is the first cousin to Bananaman (Mr. Peel). He attacks other wrestlers with his illusion casting and his Be-Dazzler Signature move. He is a hidden creatable character in Kinnikuman-Nisei:Legends VS New Generations.
The Protector (ザ・プロテクター)
Voiced by: Shinichiro Ohta/Eric Stuart (US). A one-eyed knight-like wrestler that is powerful and tough to take down unless you find his weak spot.

== Chōjin Olympics: The Resurrection (Anime: Chōjin World Grand Prix) ==
Ikemen Muscle (イケメン・マッスル)/Ikemen McMadd
Voiced by: Tetsu Inada→ Shinichiro Ohta/Pete Zarustica (US). Harabote's son. He takes over his position as chairman of the Choujin Olympics. His last name was changed in the English version to avoid any implication that he's related to the Muscle family (called Kinniku in the Japanese original). Is ridiculed about his face, and hates Mantaro greatly. Ikemen roughly translates to "hottie" in Japanese.
Jacqueline Muscle (ジャクリーン・マッスル)/Jacqueline McMadd
Voiced by: Junko Noda/Kathleen Delaney (US). Harabote's daughter and Ikemen's younger sister. She is beautiful and busty but prefers violent matches and can be pretty mean (she can even make Ikemen cry). She becomes kinder after the Mantaro/Kevin Mask bout and even supports Rinko and Mantarou hooking up.
Croe (クロエ) / Lord Flash
Voiced by: Hideyuki Tanaka→ Eiji Takemoto/Madeline Blaustein (US). Kevin Mask's second and the only person he trusts. In actuality, he is Robin Mask's former student Warsman. Kevin's OLAP technique is a reversed version of Warsman's Palo Special and other techniques of Kevin's are based on his.
Ricardo (ヒカルド)
Voiced by: Toshiyuki Morikawa/Wayne Grayson (US). 189cm. 6'2.5'. Choujin Power: 1,210,000. Born an Akugyō Chōjin, he was raised as a Seigi Chōjin Submission Artist in Brazil. When his overbody eventually cracks open, his dMp roots are revealed and he turns into the "Lord of Darkness", a jaguar/piranha chojin who gleefully ignores the concepts of rules and mercy. Ricardo gained popularity in Brazil and eventually entered Brazil's preliminary tournament to be a Choujin Olympic representative. At the Chōjin Olympics he is seconded by his friends Gazeman (ガンキュー Gankyū) and Pelé (ペレ). He defeats Jade in the quarter-finals, and then proceeds to lose to Mantarou in a semifinal match that involves a large, wooden structure covered with razor-sharp blades ("Punishment X", manga) or a similar device that confers electric shocks ("Electrolix", anime). Trademark Techniques: Torture Slash, Zuffara, Iguazu Lock, Araña Clutch.
Pashango (パシャンゴ)
Voiced by: Tomohisa Asou. Ricardo's trainer who taught him a multitude of submission moves (their style is likely meant to be an exaggerated variation of Brazilian jiu-jitsu). One day, during a sparring match, he witnesses Ricardo partially transform into his "Lord of Darkness" version and subsequently attacks him as he would any other Akugyō Chōjin. Shocked and angered, Ricardo slays his master with the Torture Slash, then passes the murder off as an accident to his fellow students Hugo (ウーゴ), Silva (シウバ), and Hitōdé (ヒトーデ). However, as the others leave to find medical assistance, Silva lingers behind and sees Ricardo stomp on Pashango to ensure his demise.
Ilioukhine (イリューヒン) / Comrade Turbinski
Voiced by: Kouichi Toochika/Madeleine Blaustein (US). 193 cm. 6'4'. Homeland: Russia. Choujin Power: 1,200,000. A wrestler that can transform into various forms of aircraft. He first shows up during the final preliminary competition (the three-legged race) with Meat as his partner. He defeated Destruction in the 2nd Round but lost to Kevin Mask in the semifinals. He shows up again on the side of good during the Demon Seed arc and fights Meltdown. He teams up with Barrierfreeman as Fireball – Flying Fogey Squad during the Ultimate Choujin Tag Arc. His name is a parody of the Ilyushin aircraft manufacturer company and Sambo Fighter Mikhail Ilioukhine . Nicknames: Red Aircraft of Death. Trademark Techniques: Death Airplane, The Turbulence.
Barrierfreeman (バリアフリーマン)
Voiced by: Yasuhiko Kawazu/Ted Lewis (US) (Nils), Bin Shimada (Jijoman). Homeland: Sweden. Choujin Power: 420,000.a Gattai Choujin (合体超人,, Composite Superman), and is the fusion of the young man Nils (ニルス) and the old man Jiijoman (ジージョマン). Nils' serious consideration towards barrier-free has made him a hero of the senior community, while Jiijoman's violent fighting style and lecherous personality disappoints the seniors. Near the end of their match with Mantaro, Nils allows Mantaro to defeat them and then leaves. Jijoman tricked Nils into letting him become a part of him, giving the native wrestler his fighting style. Nils' special abilities is to alter his body so Jijoman can fight. He later appears as a good guy during the Demon Seed Arc and fights The Tatooman to a draw. He teams up with Ilioukhine as Fireball – Flying Fogey Squad during the Ultimate Choujin Tag Arc. Trademark Techniques: Narayama Backbreaker, Children's Limbo Lariat.
The Nōsonman (ザ☆農村マン) / El Niño
Voiced by: Takashi Nagasako/Dan Green (US). A farmer Chojin whom seconds Mantaro during the Chojin Crown Finals after Meat is injured catching Ilioukhine. Trademark Techniques: Thresh Suplex, Rice Harvest Sobat, Straw Hat Revolution, Guillotine Leg Drop.
The Matenrō (ザ・摩天楼) / Sly-Scraper
Voiced by: Yasunori Masutani/Frank Frankson (US). An American made from a stretchable 110-story high hotel, he can deliver deadly power bombs. Terry the Kid was his coach in his fight with Ricardo who managed to defeat The Matenrō.
Wash Ass (ウォッシュ・アス) / Hollywood Bowl
Voiced by: Takashi Nagasako/David Schecter (US). A Peruvian wrestler modeled after a toilet seat. After his trainer Benkiman had been defeated by Kinnikuman, Wash faced Mantaro in the first round, but was defeated. Has IOIO on his chest and WC on his belt.
Pri-Clun (プリクラン) / Photo-Pat
Voiced by: Takumi Yamazaki/Megan Hollingshead (US). A Croatian wrestler with unknown gender. When Photo-Pat takes a snapshot, everyone in its path turns into photograph. Its name is a parody of the "Print Club" photo-sticker machines that are all over Japan. Renamed Printman in the anime. Trademark Techniques: Smack Down Picture.
Chijimiman (チヂミマン)
Voiced by: Takashi Nagasako/Darren Dunstan (US). A Korean wrestler nicknamed the "Blue Chili Pepper". He was defeated by Kevin Mask. Named after the Korean cuisine jijimi (also known as buchimgae). Trademark Techniques: Seolleongtang Flip, Shujutsu Ishinabe Wari (蹴術・石鍋割り), Dwi Chagi, Dolsot Split.
Destruction (デストラクション) / D-Struction
Voiced by: Kenji Nomura/Frank Frankson (US). 203cm 6'7'. An Iraqi wrestler with 3 horns on his head. The horns can be used as radar. One of his biggest fans is Saddam Hussein, who came in person to see him compete. Trademark Techniques: Avalancher Crush, Twister Antenna.
Note: In chapter 126 this Destruction is not even shown, but a Choujin later called Genocide (also from Iraq) is credited to its contributor as "Destruction" and also wears a sash bearing that name. This Destruction eventually appears briefly in chapter 131 during the Beach Flags Race.
Legocs (レゴックス) / Blocks
Voiced by: Hisao Egawa/Eric Stuart (US). A Dutch wrestler made of toy bricks that can transform into different shapes. However, a black brick among the blocks is the weak point. This led to his defeat in his match against Kevin Mask. His design was inspired by the Lego building blocks. Renamed Blocks in the anime for legal concerns. Trademark Techniques: Bookend Crush, Sliding Cocobat, Decoration Block, Sensational Clone, Steamroller, Regeneration.
Yoneo Sasaki
Voiced by: Eiji Takemoto/Eric Stuart (US). A fat, effeminate man who is a big fan of Mantaro's. Much to Mantaro's dismay, he ended up being partnered with Yoneo during the Chojin Olympic Preliminaries. He assisted Mantaro during his fight with Wash Ass by setting up a beef bowl stand. Very little is known about him, but he has been seen riding in a limousine with men who refer to him as "Chairman".
Ezoman (エゾマン)
From Hokkaidō (Ezo), Japan. He wears a Hokkaidō-shaped mask. His father is from Kagoshima and wears a Kyūshū-shaped mask.
Power Commando Joe (パワーコマンド・ジョー)
Voiced by: Yasunori Masutani
Mad Penguin (マッド・ペンギン)
Bananaman (バナナマン)
Voiced by: Toshiyuki Morikawa. A Taiwanese wrestler modeled after a banana. He was defeated by Mantaro. Trademark Techniques: Banana Peel.
The Gunkan Maki (ザ・軍艦魔鬼 The Battleship Roll) / Bobby Wasabi
Voiced by: Takumi Yamazaki
Baaronos (バアロノス)
Voiced by: Yasunori Masutani
Mad Skelton (マッドスケルトン)
Voiced by: Yasunori Masutani.
Ifritman (イフリートマン)
Named after the Ifrit.
Duke Stamp (スタンプ公爵)
Knitman (ニットマン)
Mr. Gatcha (ミスター・ガッチャ) / Mr. Dispenser
Voiced by: Ryōtarō Okiayu
King Castle (キング・キャッスル)
Voiced by: Toshiyuki Morikawa
Maryū (マリュウ)
Kaiser Moon (カイザームーン)
The Coasterman (ザ・コースターマン)
Drag Slave (ドラグ・スレイブ)
The Crabman (ザ・クラブマン)
Big Horn (ビッグ・ホーン)
Sharkman (シャークマン)
Spikeman (スパイクマン)
The Assassin (ジ・アサシン)
Sea Devil (シー・デビル)
Sky Claw (スカイ・クロウ)
The Eagle (ザ・イーグル)
Hydeman (ハイドマン)
Hoffman (ホフマン)
Bō Thunder (坊サンダー)
Gantetsu (ガンテツ)
Dark Angel (ダーク・エンジェル)
Ringman (リングマン)
Zicoman (ジーコマン)
Parody of Zico.
Rengeman (レンゲマン)
Renge (蓮華) can mean lotus or Chinese soup spoon.
Arahan (阿羅漢 arhat)
Fond de Veau (フォンド・ホー)
Maxim (マキシム)
Submitted under the name Cooking Master.
Thunder Storm (サンダー・ストーム)
Horusman (ホルスマン)
Named after Horus.
Mr. Ship (ミスターシップ)
Conchiglie (コンキリエ)
The Kaikaiman (ザ・カイカイマン)
Tigur (ティーグル)
Genocide (ジェノサイド)
Iron Mask (アイロン・マスク)
Ironing Chojin.
Bossam (ポッサム Possamu)
A vacuum cleaner chōjin. Has "wind god" (風神) written on his face. Named after Bossam (food).
Bingoman (ビンゴマン)
Pachinker Z (パチンカーZ)
Tornado Fan (トルネード・ファン)
Ghost Viking (ハ ーストバイキング)
Nazcaman (ナスカマン)
Nazca Lines chōjin.
The DIEoxin (ザ・ダイオキシン)
Dark Knight (ダークナイト)
Powerman (パワーマン)
The Noodleman (ザ・ヌードルマン)
Captain Star (キャプテン・スター)
King the Burger (キング・ザ・バーガー)
The Snake Eye (ザ・スネークアイ)
Lion King (シシキング Shishikingu)
Vectorman (ベクトルマン)
Gemini
Denimman (デニムマン)
Osman (オスマン)
Named after Osman I.
Armageddon (ハルマゲドン Harumagedon)
The Sensation (ザ・センセーション)
A NEMA connector chōjin.
Killer Mark II (キラーマークII)

== Demon Seed Arc ==
Kuan (クァン)
A wild boy Chōjin that befriends Mantarō after a devastating loss.
The Constellation (ザ・コンステレーション)
An Icelandic constellation chojin. Choujin Power: 8,200,000. He had similar 4D powers to Pentagon and Black Hole. He defeated Buffaloman and then defeated Mantarou's Muscle Millennium technique. Mantarou eventually defeated him with an incomplete Muscle G.
Gepparland (ゲッパーランド)
A fish-faced chojin from Marseille, France. Choujin Power: 8,450,000. He fought and lost to Hanzou.
Meltdown (メルトダウン)
A motorcycle chojin from Chicago, Illinois. Choujin Power: 9,540,000. He fought and lost to Ilioukhine.
The Tattooman (ザ・タトゥーマン)
Chojin from Hokkaidō. Choujin Power: 8,600,000. He fought Barrierfreeman to a draw.
Voltman (ボルトマン)
A high-voltage Jamaican Chojin with a microwave oven in his chest. Choujin Power: 12,000,000. He and Ashuraman formed the tag team The Demolitions. They fought and defeated Kevin Mask and Scarface and then faced Mantarou and Kevin. Voltman was defeated by Mantarou and Kevin's Niku→Lap technique.
Reborn Ashuraman (再生（リボーン）アシュラマン) / Shivano
An Asura chojin from the previous series. Choujin Power: 10,000,000. A family tragedy turned him back to the side of evil. While fighting Scarface he developed the Ultimate Ashura Buster, combining the Ashura Buster and the Ultimate Scar Buster. He was defeated by Mantarou's new finishing move, the Muscle G.
Shiva (しは)
Ashuraman's son. He was training to be a Seigi Chōjin like his father, but when he discovered Ashuraman's evil past his demon blood takes hold of him. He later kills his mother causing Ashuraman to kill him and, as a result, return to his demon ways and team up with General Terror.
General Terror (恐怖の将 Kyōfu no Shō)
The mastermind behind the Demon Seeds, planning to use Meat as the medium of his resurrection, only to be foiled by Ashuraman. By his outline, it is heavily implied that is in fact Akuma Shogun with some even mentioning him. However due to the events of the Gold Mask arc of the previous series, it is more likely that he is an incarnation of Satan.

== Young Master of London Arc ==
Robin Mask (Young) (ロビン・マスク(若年))
Approximately 22 years old. Captain of the Oxford University rugby team, he grows tired of rugby and decides to take up Choujin Wrestling. However, his girlfriend Alisa's father Paul says "If you want to marry Alisa you must quit being a Choujin", so Robin becomes a regular human. Paul is pleased with the human and maskless Robin, but when Robin sees his friend John Bullman brutally murdered by Akugyou Choujin Guillotine King on TV, he decides to become a Choujin again in order to protect England. With help from Terryman he once again becomes the Noble Persona. And so, he heads for the 19th Choujin Olympics English Qualifying Rounds and challenges Guillotine King to a fight and defeats him with a Tower Bridge.
Alisa MacIntosh (アリサ・マッキントッシュ)
Robin Mask's fiancee who attends Oxford University with him. The daughter of a banker.
Terryman (Young) (テリーマン(若年))
Approximately 16 years old. He has come to England in order to verify Robin Mask's abilities. He saved human Robin from a gang of punks and then help him regain his Choujin Power.
Paul MacIntosh (ポール・マッキントッシュ)
Alisa's father. He considers Choujins to be monsters and opposes Robin and Alisa's engagement. He changes his mind after Robin defeats Guillotine King (and by extension saves his bank customers).
Robin Grande (ロビン・グランデ)
Robin Mask's grandfather.
John Bullman (ジョンブルマン)
A friend of Robin Mask and a member of Scotland Yard's Choujin Branch. Named for John Bull.
Sherlockman (シャーロックマン)
A competitor in the 19th Choujin Olympics English Qualifying Rounds. Named for Sherlock Holmes.
Maximillion (マクシミリアン)
A competitor in the 19th Choujin Olympics English Qualifying Rounds.
Skull Crow (スカルクロウ)
A competitor in the 19th Choujin Olympics English Qualifying Rounds.
The Sacrifice (ザ・サクリファイス)
A competitor in the 19th Choujin Olympics English Qualifying Rounds.
Guillotine King (ギロチン・キング)
An Akugyou Choujin who crashes the 19th Choujin Olympics English Qualifying Rounds and kills John Bullman.

== Part 2: Ultimate Choujin Tag Arc ==
Muscle Brothers Nouveau (マッスルブラザーズ・ヌーヴォー)
Team of Mantarou and Kinnikuman Great III (Chaos).

Chaos (カオス)
A young man who grew up in the Gakincho House (がきんちょハウス) orphanage. He is a huge Choujin Otaku and has an extensive collection of Choujin items, including Kinkeshi (M.U.S.C.L.E.) figurines. In order to earn money for his orphanage, he would take part in a bogus Choujin Wrestling show as Butanikuman (ブタ肉マン,, Porkman). After seeing his potential, Mantarou invites him to team up as the Muscle Brothers Nouveau and participate in the Ultimate Choujin Tag Tournament. Because he was a human he was not allowed to participate in the tournament, so he obtained the Kinnikuman Great mask in order to hide his identity and pose as a Choujin. Chaos is a very kind, although somewhat childish, character. Though he claims to be a human and not a Choujin, as a child a horn grew on the side of his head. Currently the horn is gone and in its place is a keyhole shaped hole, a characteristic shared with the Jikan Choujin (時間超人,, Time Supermen). He works as a bogus Choujin Wrestler named Butanikuman (ブタ肉マン,, Porkman), putting the money he earns into the Gakincho House (がきんちょハウス) orphanage he grew up in. Although Chaos seems to have feelings for Rinko, he has a huge crush on singer Seiko Matsuda and has a collection of her merchandise. He appears to greatly admire Idol Choujin Geronimo as a fellow "human fighting alongside Choujins". When he was younger his parents and fellow villagers were murdered, the trauma of which causes him to occasionally go into spasms (at which point his fighting strength is weakened). On said occasions he is given a sedative (given in the same manner as asthma medication). He refers to himself in the first person as Wachiki (ワチキ) (occasionally using the more common Boku (ボク)). When he overhears Meat encouraging Mantarou to give up on the tag team, he goes into shock and tries to run away. But in order to obtain the key (courage) to open his sealed memory, he returns to the tournament. The Great Mask still has the tear in the forehead from the Dream Tag Tournament, so Chaos' hair sticks out.

Five Disasters (世界五大厄(ファイブ・ディザスターズ))
Team of Lightning and Thunder. Also referred to as the "Evil Time Choujins". They have gone back in time to right after the Dream Tag Arc from the first series in order to steal the Completion Bulbs that are growing on the bottom of the Tag Trophy. They kill Robin Mask, causing the New Generation to go after them and fix history. Tag Techniques: Deathwatch Branding, Disaster Press, Legendary Destruction Bell.

Lightning (ライトニング)
Time Choujin No. 1 and leader. He has a calm and sly personality and focuses on technique and finesse. Laugh: Jowajowajowa. He possesses the ability to travel a few seconds in time when he puts in his mouth piece. He calls this technique Acceleration. Trademark Techniques: Lightning Cutter, Four Point Impact.
Thunder (サンダー)
Time Choujin No. 2 and the bigger of the two. Like Lightning he is sly but focuses more on brute strength. Laugh: Nuwanuwanuwa. He usually wears an overbody with the face of a lion and the clothes of a Greek Mythology soldier. His left shoulder guard, which resembles a lion's paw, can be used as a giant claw. His left hand can transform into the Legendary Destruction Bell, but it was destroyed by Geronimo's Apache Death Scream. Trademark Techniques: Calamity Cross.

The Machineguns (ザ・マシンガンズ)
Team of Kinnikuman and Terryman. They do not believe that Mantarou and Kid are their future sons and look down on them. Lately though, Terry has been softened. Geronimo and Brocken Jr. are serving as their seconds. Tag Techniques: Muscle Docking.
20 Million Powers (200万十パワーズ, Nisenman Pawāzu)
Team of Mongolman (Ramenman) and Buffaloman. Tag Techniques: Long Horn Train.
The Adrenalines (ジ・アドレナリンズ)
Team of Terry the Kid and Robin Mask. The name comes from their ability to excite the audience with their terrific matches. Robin is aware that Kevin is his son. Tag Techniques: Tag Formation A, Adrenalin Bridge.
Handblades (テガタナーズ, Tegatanāzu)
Team of Brocken Jr. and Geronimo. Terryman gave them their name in reference to their handblade moves, the Red Rain of Berlin (Brocken) and the Tomohawk Chop (Gero). Defeated in a Reserve Match against the Five Disasters. They trust the New Generation. Tag Techniques: Sorrowful Rain of Friendship.
Hell Expansions (ヘル・イクスパンションズ)
Team of Neptuneman and Seiuchin. The names come from the fact that the original Hell Missionaries have technically expanded. They are collecting the skin off of their opponent's faces. Tag Techniques: Optical Fiber Cross Bomber, Mask the End.
Super Trinities (スーパートリニティーズ)
Team of Jade and Scarface. The name comes from them excelling at three things: Technique, Strength, and Looks. Defeated in the first round by the Hell Expansions. Tag Techniques: Red Rain Swallow.
Fireball • Flying Fogey Squad (火の玉・飛爺隊, Hi no Tama • Hijiitai)
Team of Ilioukhine and Barrierfreeman. Eliminated in the preliminary Battle Royal when they saved the Mantaro from the Optical Fiber Cross Bomber. Their souls showed up to aid Geronimo during the Reserve Match. Tag Techniques: Tokko Attack, Carnal Desire Payment Belltoll.
Hells Bears (ヘルズベアーズ)
Team of Michael and Belmondo. They were Teddy Bear costumes. Tag Techniques: Teddy Crusher.

Michael (マイケル)
Hells Bears No. 1. He gives off the impression of being kind but is a brutal fighter in the ring. Animalistic cry: Ku~n!
Belmond (ベルモンド)
Hells Bears No. 2 (colored black). Revealed to be Warsman during his battle against Team Cosmos. First believed so because of Mongolman's reaction towards him was similar to his reaction to Croe, where he feels pain in the scars he got from fis last fight with Warsman. After he punches Meteorman in a fist to fist attack, Meteorman gets a stabbing wound on his knuckles in the pattern of Warsman's Bear Claws. He also used the Storm Elbow technique and performs a Screw Driver when coming out of the bear costume.

Carpet Bombings (カーペット・ボミングス)
Team of Ortega (オルテガ) and Moaidon (モアイドン). Defeated in the quarter finals by The Machineguns.
Killer Carpenters (殺人カーペンターズ, Satsujin Kāpentāzu)
Team of Deiku Tōryō (デーク棟梁,, Master Carpenter) and The Plastic Modelman (ザ・プラモマン, Za Puramoman). Defeated in the first round by the Muscle Brothers Nouveau.
Wailing Ghost Gang (鬼哭愚連隊, Kikoku Gurentai)
Team of Shikōtei (死皇帝,, Death Emperor) and The Gaon (ザ・ガオン). Defeated in the first round by The Adrenalines.
Team Cosmos (チーム・コースマス)
Team of Sputnikman (スプートニックマン) and Meteoman (メテオマン). Defeated in the first round by the Hells Bears (whom they called "Misha" as an insult).
Illusions (イリュージョンズ)
Team of The Alphabet (字・アルファベット) and Master Shuffle (マスターシャッフル). Eliminated in the preliminary Battle Royal by the Five Disasters.
Celebrities (セレブレティーズ)
Team of Neo Chopin (ネオ・ショパン) and Roseman (ローズマン). Eliminated in the preliminary Battle Royal by The Machineguns.
Jungle Books (ジャングルブックス)
Team of Gori Max (ゴリマックス) and Savannah (サバンナ). Eliminated in the preliminary Battle Royal by the Hell's Bears.
Saudi Arabian Combo (サウジアラビアコンビ)
Team of Masked Aladdin (マスクド・アラジン) and Buchanan (ブキャナン, Bukyanan). Killed along with several other teams by the Five Disasters the night before the tournament.
Ittou Mask (一等マスク,, The Best Mask)
A competitor in the bogus Choujin Wrestling Show that Chaos worked for, Based on Neptuneman. Although he doesn't really look like him, Mantaro humorously believes him to be the real Neptuneman and tries to attack him. He was scripted to win the match but is defeated by Chaos and Mantaro.
Curry Lou Thesz (カレー・ルー・テーズ)
A competitor in the bogus Choujin Wrestling Show that Chaos worked for, based on Curry Cook. His brass knuckles accidentally hitting Rinko is what causes Chaos to go against the script and attack everyone. Named after Wrestling pioneer Lou Thesz known for patenting the Thesz Press.
Beefman (ビーフマン)
A competitor in the bogus Choujin Wrestling Show that Chaos worked for, based on Buffaloman.
Robin Mouse (ロビンマウス)
A competitor in the bogus Choujin Wrestling Show that Chaos worked for, based on Robin Mask.
Tanmenman (湯麺男)
A competitor in the bogus Choujin Wrestling Show that Chaos worked for, based on Ramenman.
The Tenmusu (ザ・天むす)
A competitor in the bogus Choujin Wrestling Show that Chaos worked for, based on The Mountain. He is actually four midgets in a costume.
Kawazaki-kun (川崎くん)
Chaos' fellow Choujin Otaku. Chaos will often beat him up to gain possession of rare Choujin Goods (most notably the Great Mask).
Ilioukhine's Father (イリューヒンの父親,, Iryūhin no Chichi'oya)
Shown in a flashback as Ilioukhine and Barrierfreeman are preparing to crash into the Optical Fiber Cross Bomber. He would often tell young Ilioukhine of "drúžba" (friendship).

== See also ==
- Kinnikuman characters
