= Yasuhiko Kawazu =

Japanese voice actor (born 1966)

- Born: January 21, 1966 (age 60); Tokyo, Japan
- Occupation: Voice actor
- Years active: 1990–present

Yasuhiko Kawazu (川津 泰彦, Kawazu Yasuhiko; born January 21, 1966) is a Japanese voice actor affiliated with Aoni Production.

== Filmography ==
=== Television animation ===
1991

- Kinnikuman: Kinnikusei Oui Soudatsu-hen, Golemman, Iwao, Leopardon, Mixer Taitei, Motorman, Rikishiman, Mr. Refereeman

1992

- Sailor Moon, Worker (ep 27)

1993

- Yuusha Tokkyuu Might Gaine, Jarmanee
- Dragon League, Torosa
- Slam Dunk, Takasado Kazuma

1994

- Marmalade Boy, Mr. Rainy

1995

- Romeo and the Black Brothers, Policeman B (ep 11), Sonny
- Slayers, Examiner B (ep 16)

1996

- Gegege no Kitarō, Kani-Boushu (2nd), Yagyou-san (2nd)

1998

- DT Eightron, Uouru
- Doctor Slump (Remake), Gorilla
- Bomberman B-Daman Bakugaiden, Shinpanbon

1999

- Turn A Gundam, Corin Nander
- Colorful, Itani
- Digimon Adventure, Shellmon
- One Piece, Hocker, Tansui, Elizabeth

2000

- Ghost Stories, Janitor
- Inuyasha, Sesshomaru's Ogre, Tsubaki's Ogre, Undead Ogre
- Shinzo, Sago

2001

- Run=Dim, Shōhei Moriguchi
- Project ARMS, Aya's Father
- Sugar: A Little Snow Fairy, Farmer B (ep 16)
- Project ARMS: The 2nd Chapter, Keith Silver

2002

- Ultimate Muscle, Brocken Jr.
- MegaMan NT Warrior, Glide
- Jing: King of Bandits, Sweet Stout (ep 10)
- Witch Hunter Robin, Custodian (ep 1), Morie
- Mobile Suit Gundam Seed, Fredrik Ades, Herman Gould (ep 7)
- Tsuri Baka Nisshi, Chief Akiyama, Hazetarou (1st Voice), Narration

2003

- E's Otherwise, Balk
- The World of Narue, Avalonian
- Super Kuma-san, Ice Cream Vendor
- Sonic X, Mr. Smith (ep 37)
- Popotan, Doctor (ep 3)
- Planetes, Male Actor (ep 5)
- Rumbling Hearts, Haruka's Father
- Chrono Crusade, Farm Owner

2004

- Sgt. Frog, Gesu-chan (ep 13)
- Kinnikuman Nisei - Ultimate Muscle (2004), Barrierfreeman (Nils), Brocken Jr.
- Girls Bravo, Supermarket Manager (ep 8)
- Samurai Gun, Geki Ooi (ep 2)

2005

- Fushigiboshi no Futago Hime, Cerias
- Full Metal Panic! The Second Raid, Uekusa
- Black Cat, Maro

2006

- Gintama, Andoromeda Suitsu (ep 66), Puu (ep 1), Young Master (ep 38)
- Yume Tsukai, Kisaragi (ep 5)
- Chocotto Sister, Butcher (ep 3, 5, 13), Driver (ep 13, 17), Full-time employee (ep 4)
- D.Gray-man, Akuma C (ep 45)
- Buso Renkin, Crewmember Two
- Super Robot Wars OG: Divine Wars, Tenzan Nakajima
- Code Geass: Lelouch of the Rebellion, Commander (ep 2, 10)
- Pururun! Shizuku-chan, Aseo-kun

2007

- Gegege no Kitarō, Chef (ep 78), Chimi-Mouryou (ep 64), Fuushu (ep 41), Kouta's Father (ep 10), Michrophone Man (ep 69), Owner (ep 99)
- Pururun! Shizuku-chan Aha, Aseo-kun

2008

- H2O: Footprints in the Sand, Teruo Hozumi
- Porfy no Nagai Tabi, Mario
- Hakaba Kitarō, Co-Forest president (ep 6), Doctor (ep 1), Mizugami (ep 6, 7)
- Hakushaku to Yōsei, Marquess (ep 1)

2009

- Lupin III vs. Detective Conan, SP
- Cross Game, Seiji Tsukishima
- Dragon Ball Kai, Mr. Popo
- Eden of the East, Airport Staff (ep 2)

2011

- Rio: Rainbow Gate!, Charlie (ep 13)

2014

- Marvel Disk Wars: The Avengers, Absorbing Man

2016

- Pandora in the Crimson Shell: Ghost Urn, Myrmidon of Chicken Brothers E (ep 7)

2017

- Dragon Ball Super, Mr. Popo, Rumoosh, Zarbuto
- Mahōjin Guru Guru, Adamski (ep 10 - 16)

=== Original video animation (OVA) ===
- Bewitching Nozomi (1992), Boxing Club member (volume 1), Jack (volume 3)
- Kamen Rider SD (1993), Kamen Rider X
- Kishin Corps (1993), Al (ep 6-7), Guard (ep 1), Mochizuki (ep 3)
- Fatal Fury 2: The New Battle (1993), Ring Announcer
- Fortune Quest (1993), Nol
- Grappler Baki (1994), Kongo Ryu
- Weather Report Girl (1994)
- Fire Emblem (1996), Dorga
- Dokyusei 2 (1996), Akira Kawajiri
- Twilight of the Dark Master (1998), Squad Leader
- All Purpose Cultural Cat-Girl Nuku Nuku DASH! (1998), Computer (ep 5), Director A (ep 1–3, 5–7, 9, 11), Man in Black A (ep 7), Townsperson B (ep 11)
- Saint Seiya: The Hades Chapter - Inferno (2005), Golem Rock
- Kimi ga Nozomu Eien: Next Season (2007), Souichirou Suzumiya (ep 1)

=== Theatrical animation ===
- Dragon Quest: Dai no Daiboken Tachiagare! Aban no Shito (1992), Mariners C
- Dragon Ball Z: Broly – The Legendary Super Saiyan (1993), Moa
- Turn A Gundam: Earth Light (2002), Corin Nander
- Turn A Gundam: Moonlight Butterfly (2002), Corin Nander
- Crayon Shin-chan: Arashi wo Yobu! Yuuhi no Kasukabe Boys (2004), Justice's Subordinate
- Mobile Suit Gundam SEED: Special Edition (2004), Fredrik Ades
- Black Jack: The Two Doctors Of Darkness (2005), Doctor
- Sword of the Stranger (2007), Samurai

=== Tokusatsu ===
- Denkou Choujin Gridman (1993), Khan Giorgio (ep 37)
- Mirai Sentai Timeranger (2000), Bomb-Maker D.D. Ladis (ep 1, 32)
- Hyakujuu Sentai Gaoranger (2001), Vase Org (ep 23)
- Ninpu Sentai Hurricaneger (2002), Severing Ninja Shiransu (ep 6)
- Bakuryu Sentai Abaranger (2003), Trinoid 9: Bankumushroom (ep 10)
- Tokusou Sentai Dekaranger (2004), Botsian Zortac (ep 32-33)
- Ultraman Max (2005), Alien Sran (ep 4)
- Ultraman Mebius (2006), Alien Fanton (ep 7, 49-50)
- Shuriken Sentai Ninninger (2015), Yokai Nurikabe (ep 22)
- Kikai Sentai Zenkaiger (2021), Snail Wald (ep. 12)
- Kamen Rider Zeztz (2025), Mold Nightmare (ep. 10-11)

=== Video games ===
- Langrisser (1991), Zeldo
- Langrisser II (1994), Zeldo
- Inuyasha (2001), Sesshomaru's Ogre
- Dynasty Warriors 3 (2001), Huang Zhong and Zhang Jiao
- Dynasty Warriors 4 (2003), Huang Zhong and Zhang Jiao
- Mega Man X: Command Mission (2004), Steel Massimo
- Metal Gear Solid 3: Snake Eater (2004), Commander
- Super Robot Wars: Original Generations (2007), Tenzan Nakajima and Gaza Haganar
- Rune Factory Frontier (2008), Tsubute
- Klonoa (2008), King Seadoph, Balue
- Warriors Orochi 3 (2011), Huang Zhong, Zhang Jiao
- The Wonderful 101 (2013), Laambo, Walltha
- Fitness Boxing: Fist of the North Star (2022), Jagi

=== Dubbing ===
==== Live-action ====
- Armageddon, Samoan
- Company of Heroes, Lt. Dean Ransom (Tom Sizemore)
- Dynasty Warriors, Zhang Jiao (Philip Keung)
- I Feel Pretty, Mason (Adrian Martinez)
- What Dreams May Come, Albert Lewis (Cuba Gooding Jr.)

==== Animation ====
- The Batman (Oswald Cobblepot/Penguin)
- Thomas the Tank Engine & Friends (Toby (Season 1-8), Spencer (Season 7-8), Terence (Season 1-5), Max (Season 6), Stephen Hatt (Season 8), Farmer McColl (Season 8) and Lord Callan (Season 7))
- Thomas and the Magic Railroad (Toby)
- Shirt Tales (Prariedog Pete from "Moving Time")
