= Pro Wrestling (NES video game) =

1986 video game

- North American box art
- Developers: Nintendo R&D3; TRY
- Publisher: Nintendo
- Designer: Masato Masuda
- Platforms: Family Computer Disk System, Nintendo Entertainment System, Arcade
- Release: JP: October 21, 1986; NA: March 1987; EU: September 15, 1987
- Genres: Fighting, sports
- Modes: Single-player, multiplayer
- Arcade system: PlayChoice-10

Pro Wrestling (Note: Japanese: プロレス, Hepburn: Puroresu) is a pro wrestling video game developed and published by Nintendo. It was released originally for the Famicom Disk System in Japan in 1986. It was later released in North America and Europe on the Nintendo Entertainment System. The game was the third wrestling game on the Nintendo Entertainment System (after Tag Team Match: M.U.S.C.L.E. and Tag Team Wrestling).

== Gameplay ==
The player chooses a character from a roster of six wrestlers, each with a unique set of wrestling moves. In addition to punching, kicking, and running attacks, wrestlers may "lock up" with each other to execute body slams, piledrivers, and other professional wrestling moves. Wrestlers are also able to climb the top two turnbuckles for additional high-flying attacks. Matches are one-on-one, with no option for tag team bouts. Downed opponents may be hauled up from the mat, allowing the opponent a window to execute additional attacks, or may be pinned instead. As in professional wrestling, a wrestler who is pinned for a three count loses the match. One-player matches are timed, with the match being declared a draw if no pinfall occurs within the five-minute time limit.

It is possible to leave the ring; however, a player who does so must re-enter the ring before the referee's 20-count. Failure to do so results in a loss (via count-out) or a draw (double count-out), if both wrestlers fail to re-enter in time. The referee's count is broken only after both wrestlers have re-entered the ring. That is, as long as at least one wrestler is outside the ring, the referee's count continues. Moreover, it is possible for a wrestler to be counted out while executing a "plancha" if he has crossed the ring ropes by the count of 20.

The game was one of the first wrestling games to feature an in-ring referee. The referee in the game is fairly accurate. For example, whenever a pinfall is attempted, the referee must run to where the two wrestlers are, lie on his stomach, and begin the three count. In effect, if the referee is on the other side of the ring when an opponent initiates a pin, the player will have additional time to try and escape. The game was also the first wrestling title to feature a cameraman and commentators at ringside (though they do not interact with the wrestlers).

=== Single player ===
Single player mode consists of two parts. First, the player fights in matches against increasingly difficult CPU opponents. After winning five matches, the player fights King Slender, the Video Wrestling Association (VWA) Champion. If the player has selected King Slender for play, then he will face Giant Panther for the VWA Championship, though some versions of the game have a bug requiring King Slender to win more than the usual five matches before being granted the title shot.

After winning the VWA Title, the second stage of gameplay begins. As the VWA Champion, the player has to defend the title. Making ten successful title defenses (two against each of the five remaining characters) will result in a title match against the Great Puma, champion of the Video Wrestling Federation. Defeating Puma will make the player the inter-promotional VWA/VWF Champion and end the game. It is worth noting that some Nintendo aficionados consider the Great Puma to be one of the most difficult boss characters to ever appear on the NES.

=== Two players ===
Fighter Hayabusa (left) wrestles Starman (right).

The two player mode in Pro Wrestling features essentially the same gameplay as single player, though without the championship quest. Each player selects a wrestler and then proceed directly into the match. The game prevents the same character from being chosen for both players. Unlike the single player mode, each match is a best-of-three-falls match. Two-player matches also lack the five-minute time limit of the single-player mode.

=== Roster ===
Each character has a set of moves specific to that character.

- Fighter Hayabusa (Japan) Back Brain Kick
- Giant Panther (U.S.A.) Head Butt and Iron Claw
- Kin Corn Karn (Korea) Karate Kick and Mongolian Chop (Karn has these instead of the base punch and kick)
- King Slender (U.S.A.) Back Breaker
- Starman (Mexico) Somersault Kick and Flying Cross Chop
- The Amazon (Parts Unknown) Piranha Bite and Outlaw Choke, which served as inspiration for Amazonian Blanka in 1991's Street Fighter 2.

== Development ==
Masato Masuda thought up the game system and was the sole programmer while he was at TRY, which later merged with Sonata to become Human Entertainment. Masuda later created Human's popular Fire Pro Wrestling series.

== Reception ==
Reception

Review score
Publication	Score
Famitsu	7/10; 8/10; 8/10; 7/10

The four reviewers of the Japanese video game magazine Bi-Weekly Famitsu. Two reviewers found it superior to previous wrestling games for the system, with one reviewer specifically mentioning Tag Team Match: M.U.S.C.L.E. and Tag Team Wrestling. The reviews disagreed with the gameplay differing on whether there were too many or not enough reviews or how difficult they were to pull off. Two reviewers complimented it for it being the most fun as a two-player game.

Computer Gaming World named it as the Best Sports Game of 1988 for Nintendo, stating that it offered realistic graphics, non-stop action and realistic wrestling moves. It concluded that Pro Wrestling was "the only wrestling game that really understands what it is simulating". Game Informer named it the 79th best game ever made in 2001. The staff considered it a trail blazer and praised its soundtrack.

Famitsu reported that Pro Wrestling was the #1 video game in the United States for about two months.

== See also ==
- List of licensed wrestling video games
