= Keshi =

Keshi may refer to:

- Keshi (singer) (born 1994), American singer, songwriter, record producer, and multi-instrumentalist
- Keshigomu, often shortened to "keshi", a type of collectible miniature figure from Japan
- Keshin, also known as Keshi, a horse-demon in Hindu mythology
- An alternative spelling for a kishie, a type pack basket native to the Shetland Islands.

== See also ==
- Kesha
