= Takumi Yamazaki =

Japanese voice actor (born 1964)

- 山崎 たくみ
- Born: Isao Yamazaki (山崎 功); April 14, 1964 (age 62); Tokyo, Japan
- Occupation: Voice actor
- Years active: 1985–present
- Agent: TSP
- Notable credit(s): Macross Plus as Isamu Alva Dyson; Mobile Fighter G Gundam as George de Sand; Kinnikuman Nisei as Seiuchin; Saint Seiya: Hades Chapter as Aries Mu; Kenichi: The Mightiest Disciple as Haruo Niijima

Takumi Yamazaki (Japanese: 山崎 たくみ, romanized: Yamazaki Takumi, born Isao Yamazaki Japanese: 山崎 功, romanized: Yamazaki Isao, April 14, 1964, in Tokyo) is a Japanese voice actor best known for voicing Torippii the anthropomorphic green parrot in the Shimajiro TV series and in the Shimajiro film series. Yamazaki took over many of the characters played by Kaneto Shiozawa after his death.

== Filmography ==
=== Television animation ===
1990s

- Shima Shima Tora no Shimajirō (1993–present) – Torippii Sorano
- Nintama Rantarō (1993) – Saburou Hachiya, Shuusaku Komatsuda
- Brave Police J-Decker (1994) – Power Joe, Masaya Kashiwazaki
- Magic Knight Rayearth (1994) – Ferio
- Mobile Fighter G Gundam (1994) – George de Sand
- Ping-Pong Club (1995) – Izawa
- After War Gundam X (1996) – Roybea Loy
- Detective Conan (1996) – Announcer
- Flame of Recca (1997) – Hanemaru
- Slayers TRY (1997) – Jillas Jillos Jilles
- Devil Lady (1998) – Kiyoshi Maeda
- Nightwalker: The Midnight Detective (1998) – Tatsuhiko Shido
- Ojarumaru (1998) – Denbo Hachiro
- Serial Experiments Lain (1998) – Lin Suixi

2000s

- Final Fantasy: Unlimited (2001) – Joe Hayakawa
- Hellsing (2001) – Incognito
- Inuyasha (2001) – Juromaru and Kageromaru
- Rune Soldier (2001) – Conrad
- s-CRY-ed (2001) – Kunihiko Kimishima
- .hack (2002) – Wiseman and Harald Hoerwick
- Kinnikuman Nisei (2002) – Seiuchin
- One Piece (2002) – Camus
- Ashita no Nadja (2003) – Abel Geiger
- Doraemon (2005) – Sunekichi Honekawa
- Demonbane (2006) – Doctor West
- Kenichi: The Mightiest Disciple (2006) – Haruo Nijima
- .hack//Roots (2006) – Naobi/Yata
- Gintama (2007) – Bansai Kawakami

2010s

- Super Robot Wars (2010) – Archibald Grims
- Fate/Zero (2011) – Kayneth El-Melloi Archibald
- Hyōka (2012) – Omichi
- Tamako Market (2013) – Dera Mochimazzui
- One Piece (2015) – Kurozumi Kanjuro, Kazenbo
- Saint Seiya: Soul of Gold (2015) – Aries Mu
- Demon Slayer: Kimetsu no Yaiba (2019) – Kasugai Garasu (Kasugai Crows)
- The Case Files of Lord El-Melloi II: Rail Zeppelin Grace Note (2019) – Kayneth El-Melloi Archibald

2020s

- Bofuri (2020) – Dred
- Yashahime: Princess Half-Demon (2020) – Yotsume
- Boruto: Naruto Next Generations (2023) – Bug
- The Magical Girl and the Evil Lieutenant Used to Be Archenemies (2024) – Sadalsudh
- Rurouni Kenshin: Kyoto Disturbance (2025) – Iwanbō
- The Laid-Off Cheat-Granting Mage Enjoys a Second Lease on Life (2026) – Donguri

=== Original net animation (ONA) ===
- JoJo's Bizarre Adventure: Stone Ocean (2022) – Ungalo

=== Original video animation (OVA) ===
- Macross Plus (1994) – Isamu Alva Dyson
- Initial D (2002) – Miki
- Saint Seiya: Hades Chapter (2002) – Aries Mu
- Diebuster (2004) – Casio Takashiro
- Mobile Suit Gundam: The Origin (2018) – M'Quve
- Urotsukidoji (1993) – Ruddle

=== Theatrical animation ===
- Doraemon: Nobita and the Kingdom of Clouds (1992) – Hoi's Father
- Doraemon: Nobita and the Tin Labyrinth (1993) – Soldier A
- Macross Plus: Movie Edition (1995) – Isamu Alva Dyson
- Elmer's Adventure: My Father's Dragon (1997) – Roberta
- Muscle Ginseng Competition! The Great Choujin War (2002) – Seiuchin
- Gintama: The Movie (2010) – Bansai Kawakami
- Shimajiro and Fufu's Big Adventure (2013) – Torippii, Flappie
- Shimajiro and the Whale's Song (2014) – Torippii, Flappie
- Shimajiro and the Mother Tree (2015) – Torippii, Flappie
- Shimajiro in Bookland (2016) – Torippii, Flappie
- Shimajiro and the Rainbow Oasis (2017) – Torippii, Flappie
- Shimajiro the Movie: Adventures on Magic Island (2018) – Torippii, Flappie
- Shimajiro and Ururu's Hero Island (2019) – Torippii, Flappie
- City Hunter the Movie: Shinjuku Private Eyes (2019)
- Shimajiro and the Fantastic Flying Ship (2021) – Torippii, Flappie
- Shimajirō to Kirakira Ōkoku no Ōji-sama (2022) – Torippii, Flappie
- Mobile Suit Gundam: Cucuruz Doan's Island (2022) – M'Quve
- Nintama Rantarō: Invincible Master of the Dokutake Ninja (2024) – Hachiya Saburo
- Demon Slayer: Kimetsu no Yaiba – The Movie: Infinity Castle (2025) – Kasugai Crow

=== Tokusatsu ===
- Shuriken Sentai Ninninger (2015) – Youkai Ittan-momen (ep. 9)
- Kaitou Sentai Lupinranger VS Keisatsu Sentai Patranger (2018) – Pitchi kokku (ep. 11)

=== Video games ===
- Yata in .hack//G.U.
- Mu de aries in Saint Seiya
- Ocelot in Metal Gear Solid 3: Snake Eater and Metal Gear Solid: Portable Ops
- Lemres and Akuma in Puyo Puyo Fever 2
- Archibald Grimms in Super Robot Wars Original Generations
- Emperor Peony IX in Tales of the Abyss
- Tilkis Barone in Tales of the Tempest
- Emilio Sanchez in Midnight Club: Street Racing
- Leinors in Tales of Destiny (PS2 Remake)
- Balan in Tales of Xillia and Tales of Xillia 2
- Hayato Nekketsu in the Rival Schools series
- Haruo Niijima in Kenichi the Mightiest Disciple: Clash of the Eight Fists of Ragnarok! (Shijō Saikyō no Deshi Kenichi: Gekitō! Ragnarok Hachikengō!)
- Marin Reigan in Super Robot Wars Z and Z2
- Jotaro Kido/Blaster Kid in Super Robot Wars Alpha Gaiden/GC/NEO
- Doctor West in Super Robot Wars UX
- Nicole:Premier in Togainu no Chi
- Miki in Initial D Arcade Stage 8 ∞
- Aesir/Old Loptr in Bayonetta 2
- Bloody Geist in Bravely Second
- Zako in Fitness Boxing: Fist of the North Star
- Grain in 100% Orange Juice

=== Drama CDs ===
- Abunai series 2: Abunai Summer Vacation (Papa Sudou)
- Abunai series 4: Abunai Campus Love (Sawada's friend)
- Abunai Series side story 1: Abunai Ura Summer Vacation (Papa Sudou)
- Blue na Koneko (Taku Arisugawa)
- Saigo no Natsuyasumi (Noda)

=== Dubbing roles ===
==== Live-action ====
- Dr. Dolittle – Dr. Mark Weller (Oliver Platt)
- Star Trek: Deep Space Nine – Rom (Max Grodénchik)
- The X-Files – Bart "Zero" Liquori (Jack Black)
- Mighty Morphin Power Rangers – Pudgy Pig- Food Fight (1993), A Pig Surprise (1994)

==== Animation ====
- Batman: The Brave and the Bold – Psycho-Pirate
- Cow and Chicken – Chicken
- The Powerpuff Girls – The Talking Dog
- Mickey and the Roadster Racers – Horace Horsecollar
- South Park – Phillip
