= Yudetamago =

Manga artist

Yudetamago (ゆでたまご, "boiled egg") is the pen name of the Japanese manga artists duo consisting of story writer Takashi Shimada and artist Yoshinori Nakai. They are best known for the popular manga Kinnikuman, Ultimate Muscle (Kinnikuman Nisei), and Tatakae!! Ramenman. Many English speaking fans abbreviate Yudetamago as "Yude" while discussing the different peculiarities of the duo.

== Takashi Shimada ==
Shimada Takashi (嶋田 隆司)

Story Writer. Hometown: Nishiyodogawa-ku, Osaka. Birthdate: October 28, 1960. Recognizable Feature: Droopy Eyes.
A graduate of Hatushiba High School (Higashi-ku, Sakai), up until 1984 he went by the name Takashi Kaneyama (金山 隆司,, Kaneyama Takashi). He frequently attends movie premieres, events, and interviews by himself and has the more exposure of the duo. These appearances have led to his being jokingly referred to as "The Non-Working Half of Yude". He claims to have been a naughty child in his younger days and that his favorite show was a TV Drama called Playgirl. He loved to read and draw manga, and before he met Nakai he would often draw Kinnikuman on notebook paper.

== Yoshinori Nakai ==
Nakai Yoshinori (中井 義則)

Artist. Hometown: Nishinari-ku, Osaka. Birth date: January 11, 1961. Recognizable Feature: Glasses.
A graduate of Hatushiba High School, up until 1984 he went by the name Yoshinori Iwamoto (岩元 義則,, Iwamoto Yoshinori). He has stated that he likes to stay home by himself and that his favorite actress is Mariko Kawana. Before he started school, he was an avid baseball player and fan and dreamed of one day becoming a Pro Baseball player. He liked to draw but has said that he didn't really read manga until he met Shimada.

== Meeting and debut ==
In 1971 Nakai was transferred to Osaka Municipal Suminoe Elementary, where Shimada was attending the 4th Grade. They had different classes but lived in the same apartment building and got to know each other while riding the bus to school. One day in the 5th Grade when Nakai went to play at Shimada's house, Shimada showed him his pictures of Kinnikuman.

When they both graduated to Osaka Municipal Nanryo Middle School, they began collaborating on manga ideas. Their first was an action manga called Yajuu no Kiba (野獣の牙,, Wild Fang), but they then experimented with other genres, such as baseball, karate, and romance. At first they drew strictly on notebook paper, but in the 8th Grade they drew Ramen-ya no Ton-yan (ラーメン屋のトンやん) on art paper and won the Kintetsu Manga Award. At that time they went by the pen name Takayoshi Motoyama (元山 隆義,, Motoyama Takayoshi), a fusion of their respective pen names at the time.

After they completed Hatsushiba High School and graduated to college, they continued to submit works, hoping to become manga creators. From that point on, Shimada and Nakai began to share the story and art respectively. When they were 16, they submitted their wrestling manga Gong desu yo (ゴングですよ,, Ring the Bell) to the Akatsuka Award and Mammoth (マンモス) to the Tezuka Award. Though neither won, they were noticed by an editor at Shueisha and offered to do a one shot.

In 1978, Kinnikuman almost won the 9th Akatsuka Award and then debuted in the 1979 #2 (December 1978) issue of Weekly Shōnen Jump. Although the editorial staff viewed it as a childish work that was popular, then editor-in-chief Shigeo Nishimura saw through this and headed for Osaka in order to persuade their parents into letting them become professional manga creators. At the time, both young men were already looking for jobs, but Nishimura promised to take care of them and even got them an apartment in Tokyo. In May 1979, Kinnikuman began serialization.

== Career ==
In 1978, Kinnikuman almost won the 9th Akatsuka Award and then later began serialization in Weekly Shōnen Jump.

Though originally a gag manga, from halfway through on it was a wrestling manga and became a big hit, later gaining an anime adaptation. There was also movies, special chapters, and infobooks. Also, the Choujin who appeared in the series soon appeared as keshi known as Kinkeshi, which became very popular amongst children and later came to America as M.U.S.C.L.E..

In 1982, the Kinnikuman character Ramenman became so popular that Yude made a one-shot chapter about him for Shueisha's Fresh Jump. This led to a monthly series entitled Tatakae!! Ramenman.

In March 1985, Kinnikuman won the 30th Shogakukan Manga Award.

After Kinnikuman ended, they tried several other genres of manga, but none of them ever became a big hit. In 1998 a sequel to Kinnikuman entitled Kinnikuman Nisei began serialization in Weekly Playboy and became their second big hit. It also started the Revival Manga boom.

== Works ==
Kinnikuman (キン肉マン)
Weekly Shōnen Jump (Shueisha) 1979–1987, Shū Play News (Shueisha) 2011–ongoing
Tatakae!! Ramenman (闘将!! 拉麺男, Fight!! Ramenman)
Fresh Jump (Shueisha) 1982–1989
Yūrei Kozō ga Yattekita! (ゆうれい小僧がやってきた!, Here Comes Phantom Kid!)
Weekly Shōnen Jump (Shueisha) 1987–1988
Scrap Sandayū (SCRAP三太夫)
Weekly Shōnen Jump (Shueisha) May–August, 1989
Kick Boxer Mamoru (蹴撃手(キックボクサー)マモル, Kikku Bokusā Mamoru)
Weekly Shōnen Jump (Shueisha) 1990–1991
Total Fighter Kao (トータルファイターK(カオ), Tōtaru Faitā Kao)
Terakkusubonbon (Kodansha) 1993–1995)
Lion Heart (ライオンハート, Raionhāto)
Monthly Shōnen Gangan (Enix) 1993–1995
Guruman-kun (グルマンくん)
Monthly Shōnen Ace (Kadokawa Shoten) 1994–1996
Kinnikuman Nisei (キン肉マンII世, Kinnikuman Second Generations)
Weekly Playboy (Shueisha) 1998–2011
Kinnikuman Nisei ~All Choujin Dai Shingeki~ (キン肉マンII世〜オール超人大進撃〜,, Kinnikuman Second Generations ~All Choujin Great Attack~)
V-Jump (Shueisha) 2001–2007

== Notes ==
- Yudetamago have made short cameos in the Kinnikuman movies, playing bit parts like minions or audience members.
- The name Yudetamago was decided on (depending on the member you ask) by either the snack they were eating one day, or the smell of a fart one of the duo released one day. (reference: Ultimate Muscle 17 introduction)
