= Nozomi Witches =

Japanese manga series

- Fifth tankōbon volume cover

のぞみ♡ウィッチィズ (Nozomi Wicchīzu)
- Manga
- Written by: Toshio Nobe
- Published by: Shueisha
- Magazine: Weekly Young Jump
- Original run: 1986 – 1996
- Volumes: 48
- Live-action film
- Directed by: Ikuo Sekimoto
- Studio: Matsutake
- Released: March 17, 1990
- Runtime: 100 minutes
- Original video animation
- Directed by: Gisaburō Sugii
- Studio: Group TAC
- Released: August 5, 1992 – March 10, 1993
- Episodes: 3

Nozomi Witches (のぞみ♡ウィッチィズ, Nozomi Wicchīzu), sometimes also called Bewitching Nozomi, is a manga series by Toshio Nobe which was adapted into a three episode anime OVA series in 1992.

== Plot ==
Nozomi is a former actress who moves back to Japan from New Zealand. Upon arriving, she meets her fellow high school student neighbor Ryōtarō Shiba, who decides to join the high school boxing club.

== Anime ==
=== Cast ===
- Nobutoshi Canna - Ryōtarō Shiba
- Hiromi Tsuru - Nozomi Egawa
- Kōhei Miyauchi - Eddie
- Keiichi Nanba - Hongō
- Ryūsei Nakao - Morino
- Toshiyuki Morikawa - Nanjō
- Noriko Uemura - Ryōtarō's mother
- Michitaka Kobayashi - Announcer
- Teruhisa Tsuyusaki - Baseball club member
- Yasuhiko Kawazu - Boxing club member
- Yukari Takagawa - Buryō
- Eiji Itō - Cameraman
- Yūko Sumitomo - Club member B
- Teruhisa Tsuyusaki - Company employee A
- Kanako Hoya - Drama club member
- Natsumi Yamada - Fan
- Tomomi Ōsone, Muri Wa - Female student
- Masaharu Satō - Gichō
- Arihiro Masuda - Ishii
- Yūsaku Yara - Itsuri
- Yasuhiko Kawazu - Jack
- Shinpachi Tsuji - Jackal
- Yuri Amano - Kitagawa
- Yuka Ōno - Yōko Kitagawa
- Mitsuru Ogata - Miyamoto
- Kiyoyuki Yanada - Ōniwa
- Kōji Ishii - Ōta
- Yūko Sumitomo - Private secretary
- Junji Kitajima - Referee
- Aruno Tahara - Reporter
- Kōji Ishii - Ring announcer
- Toshihiko Nakajima - Sakakoshi
- Hideyuki Tanaka - Sawamura
- Hiroshi Tamai - Student
- Kazuhiro Yamaga - Suzuki
- Kazumi Tanaka - Tōgo
- Toshihiko Nakajima - Watanabe-kaichō
- Miyuki Matsushita - Yamazaki
- Takashi Taguchi - Yamazaki-kaichō
- Natsumi Yamada - Hitomi Yamazaki
- Mitsuo Iwata - Yūgo

=== Releases ===
Laserdisc

- Volume 1, TSL-5, ¥5800, September 21, 1994
- Volume 2, TSL-6, ¥5800, October 21, 1994
- Volume 3, TSL-7, ¥5800, November 21, 1994
- Volume 1-3 collection, TSL-58, ¥9800, May 21, 1996

== CDs ==
Nozomi Witches Sound Movie
Drama CD.
Nozomi Witches
Toei, TOCT-6290, September 27, 1991.
Nozomi Witches Original Soundtrack
Toei/TM Factory, TOCT-6639, August 26, 1992.
