= Toshio Nobe =

Japanese manga artist

Toshio Nobe (野部 利雄, Nobe Toshio; born January 18, 1957 in Utsunomiya, Tochigi, Japan) is a Japanese manga artist.

He graduated from Wako University in Machida, Tokyo. In 1979, Nobe won an honorable mention in the 18th Tezuka Award for his story Hana to Arashi ga Iku.

Naoki Urasawa worked as an assistant for Toshio when he was starting out.

== Works ==
Listed alphabetically.

- Monaco no Sora e, 22 volumes
- Monaco no Sora e 2: Alas Kagayakeru Tsubasa, 5 volumes (as of July 2006)
- Myū no Densetsu, 8 volumes
- Nobe Toshio Senshū Tanpenshū, 2 volumes so far, short story collections
- Nozomi Witches, 48 volumes, made into an OVA series from 1992–1993
- Rising, 1 volume
- Watashi no Okita-kun, 20 volumes
- Yayoi no Ōzora, 11 volumes
- Yōsei Taisen NOA, 9 volumes
