= Tag Team Match: M.U.S.C.L.E. =

1985 video game

- North American cover art
- Developer: Tose
- Publisher: Bandai
- Platform: Nintendo Entertainment System
- Release: JP: November 8, 1985; NA: October 1986
- Genres: Action, wrestling
- Modes: Single-player, multiplayer

Tag Team Match: M.U.S.C.L.E., known in Japan as Kinnikuman: Muscle Tag Match, (Note: Japanese: キン肉マン マッスルタッグマッチ, Hepburn: Kinnikuman: Massuru Taggu Matchi) is a fighting game developed by Tose and published by Bandai for the Nintendo Entertainment System. The Japanese edition is based on Yudetamago's manga and anime series Kinnikuman, but the North American edition was not due to the source material being not well-known outside Japan. Instead, the game was released as a tie-in with Mattel’s M.U.S.C.L.E. toy line, itself a rebranding of the Kinkeshi line of Kinnikuman toys.

It has eight playable characters, each with his own special move. The game was followed by a 1987 Japan-only sequel for the Famicom Disk System titled Kinnikuman: Kinniku-sei Ōi Sōdatsusen (キン肉マン キン肉星王位争奪戦, Kinnikuman: Scramble for the Throne).

== Gameplay ==
The game has two modes, one requiring the player to defeat a computer opponent while the other requires two players to fight against each other.

The A button jumps, and B punches or activates a special move after collecting an energy ball that is randomly thrown by the “trainer”.

Several moves can be done in the game, such as punch, jump, drop kick, shove, shove into ropes, flying body attack (jump into ropes and rebound), lariat aka clothesline (shove enemy into ropes and then hit A), and back drop aka suplex (press B close behind the enemy).

Although the game goes on endlessly, it officially has 255 rounds. After those rounds, the player enters round 0 (completing the 8 bit variable for rounds number), on which the speed level resets and the time per round returns to 30:00 (from round 100 reduced to 10:00).

== Release ==
The game was released in Japan on November 8, 1985. It was released in North America in October 1986.

The Gold Edition of the Japanese version of the game has been a sought-after collector's item, and is considered the "Holy Grail" of the Famicom collection. In 2017, the Gold Edition of the Famicom version has been valued at ¥2,000,000 ($18,200 USD).

== Reception ==
Retrospective Reception

Review score
Publication	Score
AllGame	2/5

The game sold 1.05 million units in Japan.

From a retrospective review, Christopher Baker of AllGame described both the graphics, sound effects and gameplay as "primitive, even for an early NES title".

== See also ==
- Kinnikuman
