= Run=Dim =

2001 Japanese-South Korean TV series

- Created by: Idea Factory; Digital Dream Studios
- Countries of origin: South Korea; Japan
- Original languages: Japanese; Korean
- No. of seasons: 1
- No. of episodes: 13

Production
- Running time: 30 minutes
- Production companies: Idea Factory; Digital Dream Studios

Original release
- Network: MBC (South Korea)
- Release: April 1 – June 24, 2001

Run=Dim (Korean: 미래전사 런딤; stylized in all-uppercase as RUN=DIM) is a 2001 Japanese-South Korean CGI animated series co-produced by Idea Factory and Digital Dream Studios. The series aired on MBC in Korea from April 6, 2001, and on TV Tokyo's network in Japan in 2001.

== Plot ==
The year is 2050. Earth is being damaged by nuclear waste. A Japanese organization, JESAS (Japan Established Security Army for Space), with militarist tendencies, dumps it illegally. In response, the Korean Green Frontier unleashes the ecologic robot Run=Dim to protect the environment. Kazuto, a Japanese young man, was used by JESAS and joined Green Frontier, led by Korean Kang Du-ta.

== Production ==
The series cost US$3,3 million to produce. Compared to Toy Story and the Korean animated series Cubix, both of which have an average of 100 characters, the series had, over thirteen episodes, 300 characters, a feat for 3D animation at the time. Being mainly animated in Korea, it had to comply with a more "contained" production environment, as the team had to remove bathing scenes involving the female protagonist and blood scenes in robot fights.

When the plot was revealed to the public in late February 2001, Japanese far-right groups sent petitions for TV Tokyo to change the name of Kang Du-ta to a Japanese name in the local dub, which was approved.

The first episode scored 3.5% on MBC, compared to the final episode of Geisters, which scored 1.7% share.

== Film adaptation ==
Cinema Service released a film adaptation in late 2001, based on key aspects of the series. For the film, JESAS was renamed NESAS. The film attracted 25,000 visits in 37 theatres upon release in November 2001, which Digital Dream Studios hoped to be a national success, as it surpassed the 24,000 visits of the local release of My Neighbor Totoro in July.
