= Kinnikuman =

Japanese manga series

- Fifth tankōbon volume cover, featuring Suguru Kinniku (right) and Meat Alexandria (left)

キン肉マン
- Genre: Action; Comedy; Sports
- Manga
- Written by: Yudetamago
- Published by: Shueisha
- Imprint: Jump Comics
- Magazine: Weekly Shōnen Jump; (1979–1987); Shū Play News; (2011–present)
- Original run: Initial run; May 28, 1979 – May 4, 1987; Continued run; November 28, 2011; – present
- Volumes: 94
Further information
Manga
Tatakae!! Ramenman
Written by	Yudetamago
Published by	Shueisha
Magazine	Fresh Jump
Original run	1982 – 1988
Volumes	12
Anime television series
Kinnikuman (Note: Retitled as Kinnikuman: Scramble for the Planet Kinniku Throne (キン肉マン キン肉星王位争奪編, Kinnikuman Kinniku-sei Ōi Sōdatsu Hen) from episode 138 onwards.)
Directed by	Yasuo Yamayoshi (#1–65); Takenori Kawada (#67–137); Atsutoshi Umezawa (#138–183)
Written by	Haruya Yamazaki; Kenji Terada
Music by	Shinsuke Kazato (Note: As credited; it is a pseudonym of Shin Kawabe.); (#1–137); Akihiko Yoshida (#138–183)
Studio	Toei Animation
Original network	NNS (NTV)
Original run	April 3, 1983 – September 27, 1992
Episodes	183 (331 segments)
Anime television series
Tatakae!! Ramenman
Directed by	Masayuki Akehi
Produced by	Masahisa Saeki
Music by	Keiichi Oku
Studio	Toei Animation
Original network	NNS (NTV)
Original run	January 10, 1988 – September 11, 1988
Episodes	35
Anime film
Tatakae!! Ramenman
Directed by	Masayuki Akehi
Music by	Keiichi Oku
Studio	Toei Animation
Released	July 9, 1988
Runtime	25 minutes
Manga
Ultimate Muscle: The Kinnikuman Legacy
Written by	Yudetamago
Published by	Shueisha
English publisher	NA: Viz Media
Magazine	Weekly Playboy
Original run	April 1998 – April 2004
Volumes	29
Manga
Kinnikuman II Sei: All Chōjin Dai-Shingeki
Written by	Yudetamago
Published by	Shueisha
Magazine	V Jump
Original run	May 21, 2001 – March 20, 2007
Volumes	4
Anime television series
Ultimate Muscle: The Kinnikuman Legacy (Note: Known in Japan as Kinnikuman Nisei (season 1) and Kinnikuman Nisei: Ultimate Muscle (season 2))
Directed by	Toshiaki Komura
Studio	Toei Animation
Licensed by	NA: Discotek Media
Original network	TXN (TV Tokyo)
English network	AUS: Cartoon Network; CA: YTV; UK: Toonami; Kix; US: FoxBox
Original run	January 9, 2002 – March 30, 2006
Episodes	77
Manga
Kinnikuman II Sei: Kyūkyoku no Chōjin Tag-hen
Written by	Yudetamago
Published by	Shueisha
Magazine	Weekly Playboy
Original run	2004 – 2011
Volumes	28
Manga
Kinnikuman Lady
Written by	Masashi Ogawa
Published by	Shueisha
Magazine	Ultra Jump Egg (formerly); Ultra Jump
Original run	June 2008 – June 19, 2013
Volumes	3
Anime television series
Kinnikuman: Perfect Origin Arc
Directed by	Akira Sato
Written by	Makoto Fukami
Music by	Yasuharu Takanashi
Studio	Production I.G
Licensed by	Netflix
Original network	JNN (CBC, TBS (Agaru Anime))
Original run	July 7, 2024 – present
Episodes	22
Related media
List of Kinnikuman films
- icon

Kinnikuman (キン肉マン; lit. 'Muscle Man') is a Japanese manga series created by the duo Yoshinori Nakai and Takashi Shimada, known as Yudetamago. It follows Suguru Kinniku, a superhero who must win a wrestling tournament to retain the title of prince of Planet Kinniku. Nakai and Takashi planned the series when they were attending high school originally as a parody to Ultraman.

The manga was originally published in Shueisha's shōnen manga magazine Weekly Shōnen Jump from 1979 to 1987, and was first adapted by Toei Animation into a 137-episode anime series broadcast on Nippon Television for three seasons from 1983 to 1986, with the final arc being adapted in 1991 as a fourth season. It restarted publication in 2011 in Shueisha's web magazine Shū Play News, and has spawned spin-off manga and anime series, video games, anime films, and several Kinnikuman-related merchandise.

There is also a sequel, the Kinnikuman: The 2nd Generation (キン肉マンII世, Kinnikuman II Sei; known as Ultimate Muscle outside Japan) manga that was serialized in Weekly Playboy between 1998 and 2004. It was published in North America by Viz Media under the title of Ultimate Muscle. It was also adapted into three different television series, all of which were broadcast on TV Tokyo in Japan and released in North America by 4Kids Entertainment.

Kinnikuman is one of the best-selling manga series in Japan, with over 85 million copies in circulation by 2025. As popular as was the anime series and its merchandise, such as Kinkeshi, a line of action figures released as M.U.S.C.L.E. in North America. It received the Shogakukan Manga Award for children's manga (Note: Although it was then published in a shōnen manga magazine, it received the award in this category) in 1984.

A new anime television series adaptation produced by Production I.G, titled Kinnikuman: Perfect Origin Arc, based on the 2011 revival manga and celebrating the 40th anniversary of the original anime television series, aired from July to September 2024 on CBC and TBS' programming block Agaru Anime, and was released worldwide on Netflix. The second season aired on the same programming block between January and March 2025. A third season has been announced.

== Plot ==
=== Kinnikuman ===
The story involves Kinnikuman (real name Suguru Kinniku), a clumsy, foolish, comical superhero who discovers that he is the missing prince of the planet Kinniku (known for producing the greatest superheroes in the universe). Since he is a clumsy fool, however, he must prove himself worthy of the throne. To do so he enters wrestling competitions and battles evil Chojin, culminating in a tournament between Kinnikuman and five pretenders to the throne: Kinnikuman Big Body, Soldier, Zebra, Mariposa and Super Phoenix. Many of Kinnikuman's allies begin as villains (Ramenman, Buffalo Man, Ashuraman and Warsman) or arrogant heroes (Terryman, Robin Mask and Wolfman). The heroes and villains are collectively known as Chojin, (Note: 超人, Chōjin) which literally means "supermen".

=== Ultimate Muscle ===
Mantaro Muscle (also known as Kid Muscle, Mantaro Kinniku in the Japanese version) is the spoiled son of superhero wrestler King Muscle (Kinnikuman in the Japanese version). After 28 years of peace, the Seigi Choujins' (Muscle League) old enemies regroup and form the Demon Manufacturing Plant (dMp, known in the English version as Destruction, Mayhem and Pain). The Muscle League has lost its edge and are overwhelmed by the young, well-trained fighters. Recognizing their weakness, the Seigi Chojin reopen the Hercules Factory (a school for superheroes) and begin training a new generation of heroes to take on the dMp. At first unwilling, Mantaro (Kid Muscle) is one of the young heroes and defeats his father to prove his readiness to graduate. He and the other new Seigi Choujin defeat several members of the dMp and meet Kevin Mask, who quits dMp when he discovers their lack of honor. They also battle Sunshine and his pupils, who destroy the dMp after developing a renewed respect for the fighting spirit of the Seigi Choujins. The manga continues with the New Generation Replacement Tournament, Mantaro's challenge to master his inherited potential (Kajiba no Kuso Chikara, "burning inner strength" or "the fire"), the return of the Chojin Olympics, a fight with the Demon Seed (a villainous group), a backstory for Robin Mask and a tag-team tournament set in the past. Although the manga begins as a fairly lighthearted, humorous (albeit violent) story, later arcs (the No Respect and Demon Seed storylines in particular) have a darker tone and frequently deal with psychological trauma.

== Media ==
=== Manga ===
Yoshinori Nakai and Takashi Shimada (collectively known as "Yudetamago"), friends since fourth grade, decided to create a manga series in high school. Before its regular publication, the series (originally a parody of Ultraman) was released as two one-shots in Shueisha's magazine Weekly Shōnen Jump in December 1978 and March 1979: Okamarasu no Maki, (Note: オカマラスの巻) which won the Akatsuka Award, and Eraginesu no Maki. (Note: エラギネスの巻) Kinnikuman was serialized in the same magazine from the May 28, 1979, to the May 4, 1987, issues. Shueisha collected its 387 chapters into 36 tankōbon, releasing them from February 15, 1980, to April 15, 1988.

The first 36 volumes were re-published as part of the Jump Comics Selection line in 26 volumes from July 19, 1994, to August 26, 1996, as part of the Jump Comics Deluxe line in 18 aizōban volumes from January 14 to November 18, 1999, and on June 6, 2013, all 36 were published in shinsōban format.

A one-shot, Muscle Returns (Note: マッスル・リターンズ, Massuru Ritānzu), was published in Kadokawa Shoten's Kakutō Ace in January 1996. Despite the title, the series only began regular publication on November 28, 2011, in Shū Play News, Shueisha's web version of Weekly Playboy. The 37th tankōbon was released on January 29, 2010, and the latest—the 94th volume—was released on October 2, 2026. Starting on July 5, 2012, e-book volumes began to be published as part of the Jump Comics Digital line; the latest digital volume publication date coincides with the print edition.

Since the series' 2011 restart, Yudetamago has published two related one-shots in Shueisha's magazines. In 2015, a 43-page one-shot titled "Kinnikuman Chōjin Retsuden" (Kinnikuman Superman Biographies) was released in Grand Jump to unfold the story of "supermen" characters. Four years later, the 47-page "Sayonara, Kinnikuman!! no Maki" (The 'Goodbye, Kinnikuman' Story) appeared in Weekly Shōnen Jump, depicting these supermen's arrival during the main character's retirement ceremony.

==== Sequel and spin-offs ====
The first manga spun off from Kinnikuman was Tatakae!! Ramenman (Note: 闘将!!拉麺男), a series focused on Ramenman which was published in Fresh Jump from 1982 to 1988. It was compiled into twelve tankōbon volumes released between 1983 and 1989. In 1998 and 1999, Tatakae!! Ramenman was re-published in 9 volumes, in 2002 in 8 volumes, between 2004 and 2006 in 12 volumes, and in 2009 in 5 volumes. Toei Animation adapted it into a 35-episode anime series, which was broadcast from January 10 to September 11, 1988. In 1988, a film was released on July, and a video game on August. On March 21, 2009, the anime series and film were released in a box set. Also, a spin-off of Tatake!! Ramenman, subtitled Chōjin Dai Meikan (Note: 超人大名鑑), was released in 1995.

After the publication of several one-shots of Ultimate Muscle: The Kinnikuman Legacy (Note: キン肉マンII世, Kinnikuman II Sei) from August 1997 to February 1998, it began appearing regularly in Weekly Playboy from April 1998 to 2004 and was published in 29 tankōbon volumes from October 19, 1998, to August 19, 2005. These 29 volumes were released by Viz Media in North America between July 5, 2004, and July 5, 2011. It was re-released in 21 aizoban volumes from September 28, 2009, to January 18, 2011. Three one-shots of Kinnikuman Legacy were published in 2002. The first, Densetsu no Joshō: Heracles Factory (Note: 伝説の序章～ヘラクレス・ファクトリー, Densetsu no Joshō Herakuresu Fakutorī), was released on February 22, and the second, SP Densetsu Chōjin Zenmetsu! (Note: SP伝説超人全滅!), was released on May 24. A guidebook titled Kinnikuman II Sei: Chōjin Taizen (Note: キン肉マン2世 超人大全) was released on July 19, 2002.

All Chōjin Dai-Shingeki (Note: オール超人大進撃, Ōru Chōjin Dai Shingeki), an Ultimate Muscle: The Kinnikuman Legacy spin-off, was serialized in V Jump from May 21, 2001, to March 20, 2007, (Note: Serialized from the July 2001 to the May 2007 issues, released on May 21, 2001, and March 20, 2007, respectively.) and its four tankōbon were published from August 2, 2002, to August 3, 2007. To continue Ultimate Muscle: The Kinnikuman Legacy's storyline, Kyūkyoku no Chōjin Tag Hen (Note: 究極の超人タッグ編, Kyūkyoku no Chōjin Taggu Hen) was published in serial form from 2004 to 2011 and released in 28 tankōbon from November 18, 2005, to December 19, 2011.

A feminized version of the series, Kinnikuman Lady (Note: キン肉マンレディー, Kinnikuman Redī), was created by Masashi Ogawa and began as a webcomic on the Ultra Jump Egg site in June 2008. Its first tankōbon was published on March 19, 2009, and in 2011 it was moved to the Ultra Jump website. The series concluded with the release of its 46th chapter in Ultra Jump, and the release of third tankōbon, both on June 19, 2013.

=== Anime ===
==== Television series ====
The first animated series based on Kinnikuman was produced by Toei Animation and directed by Yasuo Yamayoshi, Takenori Kawada and Tetsuo Imazawa. The 137-episode series was originally broadcast in Japan on Nippon Television from April 3, 1983, to October 1, 1986. It was followed by Kinnikuman: Scramble for the Throne (Note: キン肉マン キン肉星王位争奪編, Kinniku-sei Ōi Sōdatsu-hen; lit. "Dispute for the Planet Kinniku Throne"), directed by Takeshi Shirato and Atsutoshi Umezawa. This 46-episode series was also produced by Toei Animation and aired on NTV from October 6, 1991, to September 27, 1992. The first series was packaged into 12 DVDs, released from December 6, 2002, to November 21, 2003, and the second series was released on four DVDs from December 5, 2003, to March 21, 2004.

==== Ultimate Muscle ====
On January 9, 2002, Kinnikuman: Second Generation premiered; the 51-episode series aired until December 25 of that year, and was released on 12 DVDs from September 21, 2002, to August 8, 2003. Licensed by 4Kids Entertainment as Ultimate Muscle: The Kinnikuman Legacy, it was broadcast on FoxBox in the United States. In 2003 a 13-episode sequel primarily focused on non-Japanese audiences was announced; it aired on FoxBox in North America, and from April 7 to June 30, 2004, in Japan. Another 13-episode spin-off, Kinnikuman Second Generation: Ultimate Muscle 2, was broadcast from January 4 to March 29, 2006, in Japan. All three series were directed by Toshiaki Komura, produced by Toei Animation and broadcast in Japan by TV Tokyo. The two spin-off series were released as two-DVD box sets on February 24 and June 23, 2006. In October 2022, Discotek Media announced that they had licensed Ultimate Muscle and they released the 77 episodes on Blu-ray Disc on May 30, 2023.

==== Kinnikuman: Perfect Origin Arc ====
A new anime celebrating the 40th anniversary of the original anime television series was announced in March 2023. It was later confirmed to be a television series, titled Kinnikuman Perfect Origin Arc (キン肉マン 完璧超人始祖(パーフェクト・オリジン)編, Kinnikuman Pāfekuto Orijin-hen), based on the 2011 revival manga's arc of the same name, produced by Production I.G and directed by Akira Sato, with Makoto Fukami in charge of series composition, Hirotaka Marufuji designing the characters and Yasuharu Takanashi composing the music. It aired from July 7 to September 22, 2024, on CBC and TBS' brand new Agaru Anime programming block, with Netflix licensing it for streaming worldwide weekly starting on July 8 of the same year. After the final episode of the first season, a second season was announced, and it aired on the same programming block from January 12 to March 30, 2025. In August 2025, a third season was announced.

==== Films ====
Seven films based on the original Kinnikuman were released from 1984 to 1986. The first, Kinnikuman, was directed by Takeshi Shirato and released on July 14, 1984. Kinnikuman: Seigi Chōjin vs. Senshi Chōjin (Note: キン肉マン 正義超人vs戦士超人), the last film, was released on December 20, 1986, and was directed by Yasuo Yamayoshi. All seven films were compiled on a DVD released April 21, 2004.

Two films based on Kinnikuman: Second Generation were directed by Toshiaki Komura. The first (eponymous) film was released at the Anime Fair on July 14, 2001 and the second, Kinnikuman II Sei: Muscle Ninjin Sōdatsu! Chōjin Dai Sensō (Note: キン肉マンII世 マッスル人参争奪!超人大戦争, Kinnikuman II Sei Massuru Ninjin Sōdatsu! Chōjin Dai Sensō), was released at the same venue on July 20, 2002. The films were released on DVD on May 12, 2002, and April 21, 2003, respectively.

=== Video games ===
Several video games based on the series were released. The first were for home computers; a simulation game was released for the PC-88 in November 1984, followed by the 1985 fighting game Kinnikuman: Colosseum Deathmatch (Note: キン肉マン コロシアムデスマッチ, Kinnikuman Koroshiamu Desumatchi). The first console game (Tag Team Match: M.U.S.C.L.E.) was released on November 8, 1985, for Nintendo Entertainment System, and the last game (Kinnikuman: Muscle Grand Prix 2 Tokumori (Note: キン肉マン マッスルグランプリ2 特盛, Kinnikuman Massuru Guran Puri 2 Tokumori)) was released for PlayStation 2 on September 25, 2008. The social networking service GREE released Kinnikuman Memorial (Note: キン肉マン～メモリアル～, Kinnikuman～Memoriaru～) on February 27, 2014.

=== Other media ===
With the anime's popularity, Bandai produced a brand of eraser-like action figures (keshi) titled Kinkeshi between 1983 and 1987. In Japan, Bandai has released 418 different types of figures, and it was mainly sold through Gashapon. As it attracted the Northern American market's interest, it was brought out by Mattel under the name M.U.S.C.L.E., and a total of 236 figures were traded domestically in the 1980s.

In 2007, Toei asked fans if they would like to see all 418 figure types included in the Kinnikuman complete box set. On December 20, 2008, the box set with all the two first series episodes, all seven films, a TV special, and all the figures was released.

Aside from this most known series of products, a myriad of other Kinnikuman-based merchandise were released both in Japan and in the America, which vary from action figures to plush dolls, from key holders to pen drives, from picture books to trading card games.

== Reception ==
The manga series has received several awards and sold well during both its 1980s serialization and its 2010s revival. In 1984, Kinnikuman won the 30th Shogakukan Manga Award in the category Best Children's Manga. The 2013 edition of Takarajimasha's guidebook Kono Manga ga Sugoi!, a survey of the manga and publishing industries, named Kinnikuman the seventh-best manga series for male readers. Media Factory's Da Vinci magazine ranked it 23rd on the "Book of the Year" in 2019. Several volumes of the series have been featured on Oricon's weekly chart of best-selling manga in Japan; all volumes between the 40th and the 66th have reached the top 20. (Note: Volume 37 placed 28th; volume 38 placed 12th; volume 40 placed 8th; volume 41 placed 16th; volume 42 placed 10th; volume 43 placed 7th; volume 44 placed 5th; volume 45 placed 19th; volume 46 placed 7th; volume 47 placed 10th; volume 48 placed 13th; volume 49 placed 6th; volume 50 placed 13th; volumes 51 and 52 placed 8th; volume 53 placed 13th; volume 54 placed 8th; volume 55 placed 9th; volume 56 placed 8th, volume 57 placed 14th, volume 58 placed 11th, volumes 59 and 60 placed 8th, volumes 61 and 62 placed 10th, volumes 63 and 64 placed 8th, volume 65 placed 12th, and volume 66 placed 7th.) Between 2008 and 2010, five volumes of Kinnikuman II Sei: Kyūkyoku no Chōjin Tag Hen also ranked on Oricon's top 30 list. (Note: The 15th and 16th volumes ranked 26th and 27th respectively; both the 20th and 21st ranked 30th; and the 22nd ranked 29th.) The series as whole had over 77 million copies in circulation by 2021; As well as Kinnikuman's manga was considered a hit, the series' merchandise in general was also successful. by 2025, it had over 85 million copies in circulation. Bandai reported that over 180 million units of Kinkeshi were sold in Japan. Shaenon K. Garrity said, "The M.U.S.C.L.E. figurines ... were the sole American extrusion of a 1980s manga/anime/licensing phenomenon."

The original 1983 anime series was popular, premiering with a rating over 20 percent. Despite being considered "too old to be marketable on American television" by 4Kids in the 2000s, the 2008 Kinnikuman complete box set had 25,000 reservation requests by August in Japan. In 2005, Japanese television network TV Asahi conducted a "Top 100" online web poll and nationwide survey; Kinnikuman placed 97th in the online poll and Ultimate Muscle placed 39th in the survey. In 2006, TV Asahi conducted another online poll for the top one hundred anime, and Kinnikuman placed 12th in the "Celebrity List". In France, however, it caused some controversy because of the depiction of a character's garment featuring a swastika; the episode in which the character appeared was requested to be removed from air.

Garrity called Kinnikuman a "cross between superhero parody and pro-wrestling goofiness". Liann Cooper of the Anime News Network said that the "artwork alone is enough to clothesline itself and the whole concept of superhero wrestlers is like a manga-fied Mucha Lucha", but Ultimate Muscle "is actually pretty funny". Eduardo M. Chavez of Mania.com wrote that in 1979, "the series relied on its comedy and action to bring in an audience." Ultimate Muscle, while "keeping some of the old silliness", adds "some depth through a mature writing style and better action scenes." On T.H.E.M Anime Reviews, Christi wrote, "Overall, Ultimate Muscle is the best thing about the FoxBox anthology." She praised the "funny, and in their own disgusting way, charming" characters, its "crisp and well-done" animation and the "very clean and appealing" character designs.

=== Legacy ===
Widely regarded as a classic manga series, it has been cited by Fullmetal Alchemist creator Hiromu Arakawa as a series she "love[s]" and as an influence to her work, as well as by Fairy Tail's Hiro Mashima. Assassination Classroom's Yūsei Matsui cited it as one of his favorite manga, while Yoshihiro Togashi was influenced by Kinnikuman on shifting the focus of his Yu Yu Hakusho from occult detective fiction to the martial arts genre based on a similar shift Kinnikuman did from comedy to action.

Moreover, Kinnikuman has inspired real life wrestling events. At the Fight Entertainment Group's Dynamite!! 2008 martial arts event at the Saitama Super Arena, Bob Sapp fought Kid Muscle (played by Akihiko Tanaka) in an MMA match. Toei Animation announced a Kinnikumania 2009 wrestling event, scheduled at the JCB Hall in Tokyo Dome City on May 29, 2009, for the manga's 30th anniversary.

Kinnikuman's enduring popularity is also shown by it being used to co-promote Green Lantern in 2011 for the Japanese release of the film, and other characters of it appearing other merchandise, such as a series-themed onigiri, and a pollen mask advertisement.

== Notes ==
Japanese
