= Kinkeshi =

Extensive and popular line of collectible erasers

Kinkeshi (キン消し, lit. "KinnikuEraser") is an extensive and popular line of collectible erasers, an instance of the modern Japanese popular culture institution of keshi. The keshi it includes are monochromatic and derived from the Kinnikuman (キン肉マン) anime and manga franchise, whose primary motif is professional wrestling.

The line was launched in Japan in 1983, and licensed in 1985 for the American market as M.U.S.C.L.E. (reflecting Kinnikuman's English title of Muscle Man). M.U.S.C.L.E. used a harder rubber than Kinkeshi; its U.S. sequel, Ultimate Muscle, had a small release of about twenty Kinkeshi, though a larger run of figures using a plastic softer than M.U.S.C.L.E., but not eraser-like, was released exclusively in the USA.

== History ==
Starting in Japan in 1983, Bandai's Kinkeshi line was licensed in 1985 to Mattel for marketing in the United States and Canada, where wrestling had become popular. This North American line was renamed "M.U.S.C.L.E." (Millions of Unusual Small Creatures Lurking Everywhere!). The line included 236 official figures, a boardgame, a NES game entitled Tag Team Match: M.U.S.C.L.E., a championship belt figure holder, and a wrestling ring playset. The figures were distributed in clear, blister-packed random four-packs, semi-opaque garbage can 10-packs, and 28 packs featuring non-random assortments. For a short time, the figures were also distributed as a bonus in Nestlé Quik (now known as Nesquik) cans.

The main hero was Kinnikuman, who, in the US, was "Muscleman" and was the leader of the "Thug Busters". The only other named figure in the US line was Buffaloman, who was renamed "Terri-Bull", and was said to be the leader of the "Cosmic Crunchers". Some of the figures were sculpted to resemble popular wrestlers who had competed in Japan such as Terry Funk, Dusty Rhodes, Abdullah the Butcher, and Jushin "Thunder" Liger.

The first shipment of figures were all a "bubble-gum" pink color that the collecting community calls "flesh". The second shipment was a half-and-half mixture of flesh and either dark blue, red, or purple figures. The third shipment contained no flesh figures, only dark blue, red, purple, magenta, salmon, lime green, neon orange, and light blue. Five figures came with the boardgame in an exclusive grape or light purple color.

In addition to packs containing only figures, there was a mail-away poster, a "Battlin' Belt" display case, and two games released that made use of the M.U.S.C.L.E. figures. The "Hard Knockin' Rockin' Ring" game was a plastic wrestling ring with two small clamps for figures and that played much like Rock'em Sock'em Robots. The M.U.S.C.L.E. board game was a unique battle-royal style game where teams of five figures of two different colors fought. The Hard Knockin' Rockin' Ring came with two exclusive flesh figures not released in the regular line of toys, a slightly smaller version of #141 (Muscleman) and a Terri-Bull. The board game also included the same sculpt of Terri-Bull in lime green.

Circa 1987, unlicensed Kinkeshi were marketed in Western-Europe. The Sesto Fiorentino based GIG Spa company mixed three different imported keshi lines to create its own franchise. Around the same period, the Exogini line was marketed in France as Cosmix by El Greco "Un hellenistic crafts S.A.", a Greek manufacturer, to Action GT (Action Games & Toys Inc.), a North American company, and imported to France by Idéal Loisirs S.A., a famous French toy distributor. The models and even the leaflet catalogues were identical, however the package and character names were totally different. The plastic colors and types were also distinct to each line with the exception of the generic "salmon matte" type. The Exogini had more plastic variations than the Cosmix line and the third keshi series did not appear in the French line.

The very same product, including later series figure though, was sold under various names in South Korea circa 1991.

However, France was the only country, outside of the franchise's native Japan, to broadcast the Kinnikuman TV series (localized as Muscleman) by that time. Later, a dubbed Kinnikuman version was broadcast in Catalonia (Spain) as Musculman in the '90s. Its sequel, Kinnikuman Nisei, appeared in the United States (Ultimate Muscle: The Kinnikuman Legacy) in the early 2000s. In South Korea, where the manga was early published by King Comics, Kinnukuman is known as "근육맨".

Few years later, a third Kinkeshi line appeared in the United States as Alien Wrestler. It was available in Italy, where these Kinkeshi were freely included in a crisps brand's special offer. This Taiwan-made bootleg line was an inferior plastic quality compared to the first bootleg generation and featured the late "PART" series of the Kinkeshi line.

In the United States, the sequel to Kinnikuman, Kinnikuman NiSei was translated by 4Kids Entertainment in 2002 and aired from 2002–2004 on Saturday mornings. It was re-aired in 2006 as summer filler. In 2003, Bandai America launched a new Kinkeshi series extension exclusively for the North American market. Ultimate Muscle: The Kinnikuman Legacy, the American dubbed version of Kinnikuman Second Generations, is actually more successful overseas than in Japan. It enjoys a dedicated following in the 14-30 year age group. Figures, both 6.5" articulated and 1.5" M.U.S.C.L.E.-sized, based on the Ultimate Muscle storyline were released sporadically in 2003, as well as a collectible card game entitled Ultimate Muscle Battle Card Game.

In 2004, a knockoff of Alien Wrestler entitled Future Man was marketed in both mono-pink and multicolored varieties. The details of the figures were not as sharp as the official releases.

== See also ==
- Designer toys
- Micronauts
- Toyfinity
