= Keshigomu =

Collectible miniature figure made of coloured hard rubber

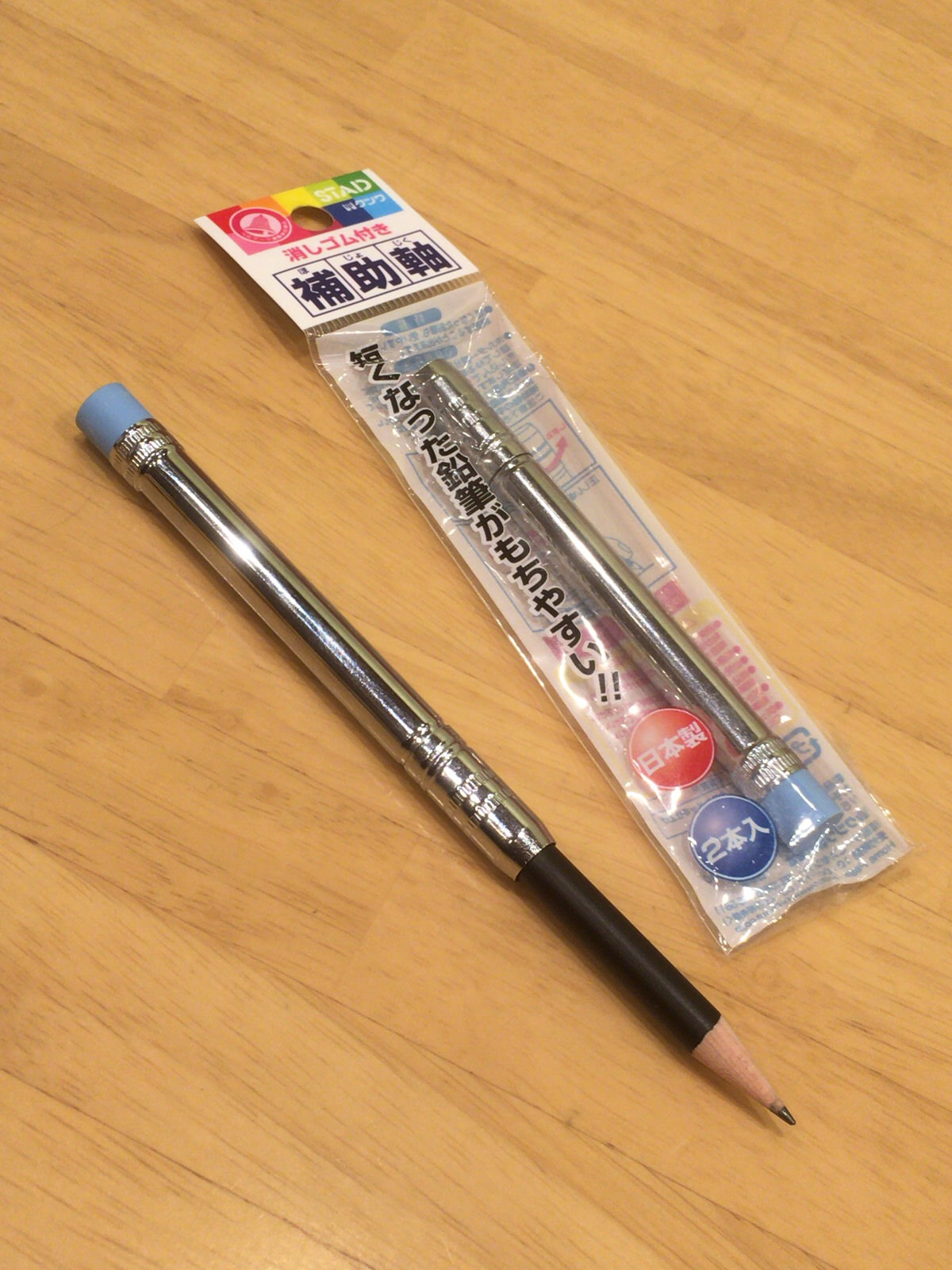
クツワ STAD 補助軸 ゴム付 RH003

Keshi (Japanese: 消し or ケシ ) aka keshigomu (消しゴム, literally "erase rubber") is the Japanese word for eraser. In modern Japanese, "keshi" refers to a collectible miniature figure, often of a manga or anime character, made of coloured hard rubber. However, the word's reference has broadened beyond its etymological meaning, as keshi are made of several types of rubber, ranging in appearance from opaque matte to transparent.

Also, some lines, such as the "Cosmos Souls Keshi Gum" (コスモスザウルス消しゴム, kosumosu saurusu keshi gomu), use plastic parts. Keshi figures are not necessarily based on Japanese comic book or TV series franchises, since there are keshi dedicated to video games (Super Mario, Zelda, etc.) and some western lines are based on local mythologies and popular culture. A similar product is often mistakenly thought be keshi, the pencil cap toy (ペンシル キャップ, penshiru kyappu) which appeared around the same period.

== History ==
Keshi is a toy genre with Japanese roots but is not limited to Japanese manufacture nor Japanese culture, as the keshi were sold and became popular all around the world in the last twenty years, and some keshi lines were made in Europe or China and exported.

This toy genre appeared in Japan during the 1970s and became increasingly popular throughout the years. Toys based on pop culture properties are popular with both children and adult collectors.

The first keshi exported outside Japan appeared in the late 1970s in Bonux packages, a Procter & Gamble washing powder released in France (and recently introduced in former USSR states such as Ukraine). The Bonux brand was launched with the "cadeau Bonux" ('Bonux present') concept, a small value mini toy hidden inside the powder. Some keshi were part of these packages, including a 10-figure series of then-famous character Monchhichi (モンチッチ): a monkey character created in 1974 by Koichi Sekiguchi and part of the first large scale, successful, exported Japanese anime franchises. The Bonux Monchhichi figures were 4.4/4.8 cm tall, chibikeshi styled, and available in seven different gums.

However, the keshi phenomenon sped-up worldwide in the late 1980s and early 1990s, with a wave of gum toy lines named M.U.S.C.L.E. ('Kinkeshi', Americanized), Fistful Of Monsters, or Monster In My Pocket in the United States.

The same lines were also exported in Europe, sometimes under different names; for instance, M.U.S.C.L.E. became Exogini in Italy and Cosmix in France. These franchises are actually composite bootleg lines including Kinkeshi/M.U.S.C.L.E., N.I.N.J.A.S. and Fistful Of Monsters, in the very same collection. Although, licensed lines also appeared in Europe, including BeastFormer localized as "Les Dragonautes" in France and Monster In My Pocket.

Around the same period, Keshi lines were also marketed in Southeast Asia, including South Korea.

== Modern keshi ==
In Japan, Keshi were still popular in the 2000s, and "keshi days" are often organized in Mandarake stores where collectors can sell and buy used keshis.

Bandai America launched the M.U.S.C.L.E.'s series' sequel in the United States market only in 2003 as a 20th anniversary celebration of the original Kinkeshi (M.U.S.C.L.E.'s original name) line. The new American keshi line is named Micro Muscle Wrestlers.

== Western keshi ==
The popular Monster In My Pocket line was created in the United States in the early 1990s as an answer to the massive success of the Japan-imported M.U.S.C.L.E. (Kinkeshi). This line was exported in Europe, as well as in Japan where it is known as 米のモンスター消しゴム ('American Monster Keshi Gum').

For the 20th anniversary celebration of its 1983–87 Kinkeshi line, the American branch of Bandai launched the Micro Muscle Wrestler line in the United States. Even though it is the sequel of the M.U.S.C.L.E. line (overseas version of the Kinkeshi Kinnikuman series), the Micro Muscle Wrestler line is exclusively marketed in the USA. In Australia, mini figures such as Shopkins and Trash Pack can be considered a type of keshi.

== Keshi packages ==
The keshi are sold in transparent plastic capsules (1–5 figures), opaque bags (1–2), plastic pots (10-pack), partially transparent carton boxsets (28), or the regular transparent plastic pack (3–6). Some lines have special packages like the Exogini pyramid ships (20/1940) in Italy, or the 205-figure collector set released in Japan (Kinkeshi). Some keshi are offered in washing powder packages, crisps (chips), or cereal bags. Catalogue color leaflets are included in Japanese capsule keshi, showing the series figures. Such series are named "PART", or its Japanese equivalent "パート" (pāto) and "ぱと" (pato), by Bandai and other brands.

== Keshi types ==
Although vending machines keshi are often considered as standard size, three different material are used: hard gum, plastic, or gum with plastic parts. Even though dark salmon matte color mini figures are the quickest types identified as keshi in western countries, due to the famous M.U.S.C.L.E. line, there are a wide variety of gum from matte to bright, from translucent to transparent, from white to black, including the deluxe painted types.

=== Dekakeshi ===
Dekakeshi (デカ消し) are larger sized keshi, released by the Marukoshi company prior to Bandai's popular lines.

=== Keshi ===
The standard keshi are 5/5.5 cm mini figures sold in transparent plastic capsules available in Bandai vending machines known as "gachagacha" (ガチャガチャ).

=== Chibikeshi ===
Chibikeshi (チビ消し) are mini size keshi released by Bandai.

=== SDkeshi ===
SDkeshi (SD消し) are Super Deformed mini size keshi released by Bandai.

=== Full color keshi ===
Full color keshi are deluxe, hand-painted keshi. Originally made in Japan, these art keshi were later manufactured in China to reduce production costs.

=== Glowing keshi ===
Glowing in the dark western keshi lines or series are made of phosphorescent gum, similar to Playskool's contemporary GLO Friends mini figures line.

== Famous keshi lines ==
List of Keshi lines by decade, sorted by the line's starting year (for example, a keshi line running from 1980 to 1995 would be in the "1980–1990" section):

=== 1980–1990 ===
- Kinkeshi (Bandai) (Japan)
  - M.U.S.C.L.E. (Mattel) (United States)
  - Exogini (GIG) (Italy)
  - Cosmix (Action GT) (France)
  - Alien Wrestler (?) (United States) (Italy)
- BeastFormer/LaserBeast (Takara) (Japan)
  - Battle Beasts/Laser Beasts (Hasbro) (United States)
  - Les Dragonautes (?) (France)
- Fistful Of Monsters (?) (United States)
  - Exogini (GIG) (Italy)
  - Cosmix (Action GT) (France)
- N.I.N.J.A.S. (Mattel?) (United States)
  - Exogini (GIG) (Italy)
  - Cosmix (Action GT) (France)

=== 1990–2000 ===
- Monster In My Pocket (Matchbox) (United States)
  - Monster In My Pocket (?) (United Kingdom)
  - Monster In My Pocket (?) (France)

=== 2000–present ===
- Micro Muscle Wrestlers (Bandai of America) (United States)
- Fistful of Power! (Moose Toys and Spin Master) (United States) (Australia)
- Gormiti (GIG), (Playmates Toys) (United States) (Italy)
- Shopkins (Moose Toys) (United States) (Australia)
- Trash Pack (Moose Toys) (United States) (Australia)
- The Grossery Gang (Moose Toys) (United States) (Australia)
