= Cultural influence of Gulliver's Travels =

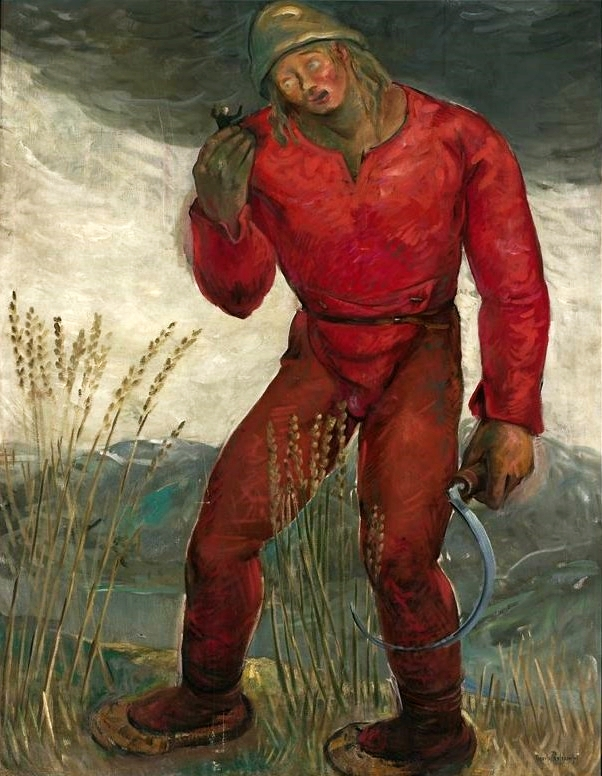
Gulliver and a giant, a painting by Tadeusz Pruszkowski (National Museum in Warsaw).

The cultural influence of Gulliver's Travels has spanned centuries.

== Cultural influences ==
From 1738 to 1746, Edward Cave published in occasional issues of The Gentleman's Magazine semi-fictionalized accounts of contemporary debates in the two Houses of Parliament under the title of Debates in the Senate of Lilliput. The names of the speakers in the debates, other individuals mentioned, politicians and monarchs present and past, and most other countries and cities of Europe ("Degulia") and America ("Columbia") were thinly disguised under a variety of Swiftian pseudonyms. The disguised names, and the pretence that the accounts were really translations of speeches by Lilliputian politicians, were a reaction to an Act of Parliament forbidding the publication of accounts of its debates. Cave employed several writers on this series: William Guthrie (June 1738 – November 1740), Samuel Johnson (November 1740 – February 1743), and John Hawkesworth (February 1743 – December 1746).

The astronomers of Laputa have discovered "two lesser stars, or satellites, which revolve about Mars". This may have influenced Voltaire, whose 1750 story Micromégas also refers to two moons of Mars. In 1877, Asaph Hall discovered the two real moons of Mars, Deimos and Phobos; in 1973 craters on Deimos were named Swift and Voltaire, and from 2006 numerous features on Phobos were named after elements from Gulliver's Travels, including Laputa Regio, Lagado Planitia, and several craters.

The term Lilliputian has entered many languages as an adjective meaning "small and delicate". There is even a brand of small cigar called Lilliput. There is a series of collectable model houses known as "Lilliput Lane". The smallest light bulb fitting (5 mm diameter) in the Edison screw series is called the "Lilliput Edison screw". In Dutch and Czech, the words Lilliputter and liliput(án), respectively, are used for adults shorter than 1.30 meters. Conversely, Brobdingnagian appears in the Oxford English Dictionary as a synonym for very large or gigantic.

In like vein, the term yahoo is often encountered as a synonym for ruffian or thug. In the Oxford English Dictionary it is considered a definition for "a rude, noisy, or violent person" and its origins attributed to Swift's Gulliver's Travels.

In the discipline of computer architecture, the terms big-endian and little-endian are used to describe two possible ways of laying out bytes in memory. The terms derive from one of the satirical conflicts in the book, in which two religious sects of Lilliputians are divided between those who crack open their soft-boiled eggs from the little end, the "Little-endians", and those who use the big end, the "Big-endians".

Fyodor Dostoevsky references Gulliver's Travels in his novel Demons (1872): 'In an English satire of the last century, Gulliver, returning from the land of the Lilliputians where the people were only three or four inches high, had grown so accustomed to consider himself a giant among them, that as he walked along the Streets of London he could not help crying out to carriages and passers-by to be careful and get out of his way for fear he should crush them, imagining that they were little and he was still a giant ...'

It has been pointed out that the long and vicious war which started after a disagreement about which was the best end to break an egg is an example of the narcissism of small differences, a term Sigmund Freud coined in the early 1900s.

== Sequels and imitations ==
- Many sequels followed the initial publishing of the Travels. The earliest of these was the anonymously authored Memoirs of the Court of Lilliput, published 1727, which expands the account of Gulliver's stays in Lilliput and Blefuscu by adding several gossipy anecdotes about scandalous episodes at the Lilliputian court.
- Abbé Pierre Desfontaines, the first French translator of Swift's story, wrote a sequel, Le Nouveau Gulliver ou Voyages de Jean Gulliver, fils du capitaine Lemuel Gulliver (The New Gulliver, or the travels of John Gulliver, son of Captain Lemuel Gulliver), published in 1730. Gulliver's son has various fantastic, satirical adventures.
- Donald Grant Mitchell retold part one of the novel in the form of a short story for children, published in St. Nicholas magazine in 1874.
- Hungarian author Frigyes Karinthy wrote two science fiction novellas that continue the adventures of Gulliver: Voyage to Faremido (1916) is an early examination of artificial intelligence, with a pacifist theme, while Capillaria (1921) is a satire on the 'battle of the sexes'.
- Soviet science fiction writer Vladimir Savchenko published Gulliver's Fifth Travel – The Travel of Lemuel Gulliver, First a Surgeon, and Then a Captain of Several Ships to the Land of Tikitaks (Russian: Пятое путешествие Гулливера – Путешествие Лемюэля Гулливера, сначала хирурга, а потом капитана нескольких кораблей, в страну тикитаков), a sequel to the original series in which Gulliver's role as a surgeon is more apparent. Tikitaks are people who inject the juice of a unique fruit to make their skin transparent, as they consider people with regular opaque skin secretive and ugly.
- The Soviet writer Andrei Anikin had likewise published a book called Gulliver's Fifth Travel, featuring Gulliver visiting a society inspired by Orwell and the Maoist China.
- Gulliver's Travels Beyond the Moon (ガリバーの宇宙旅行, Garibā no Uchū Ryokō; Gulliver's Space Travels) is a 1965 Japanese animated film, portraying an elder Gulliver taking part in a space travel, joined by a boy, a crow, a talking toy soldier and a dog. The film, although being a children's production generally fascinated by the idea of space travelling, portrays an alien world where robots have taken power. Thus it continues in Swift's vein of critical approach on themes in current society.
- The 1968 television series Land of the Giants seems inspired by the second part of the novel, as seven Earthlings go through a space warp and end up on a planet similar to Earth but everyone and everything is twelve times normal size.
- Hanna-Barbera produced two adaptations of Gulliver's Travels, one was an animated TV series called The Adventures of Gulliver from 1968 to 1969 and another was a 1979 animated television special titled Gulliver's Travels.
- American physician John Paul Brady published in 1987 A Voyage to Inishneefa: A First-hand Account of the Fifth Voyage of Lemuel Gulliver (Santa Barbara: John Daniel), a parody of Irish history in Swift's manner.
- In 1995, Milo Manara had created an erotic comic called I viaggi di Gulliver, o Gulliveriana (Gullivera, or Gulliveriana), loosely adapting all four journeys, although the Laputa part comes after the part about Houyhnhnms, which is limited to a brief scene of one wanting to mate with the heroine, and her running away.
- In 1998 the Argentine writer Edgar Brau published El último Viaje del capitán Lemuel Gulliver (The Last Voyage of Captain Lemuel Gulliver), a novel in which Swift's character goes on an imaginary fifth journey, this time into the River Plate. It satirises ways and customs of present-day society, including sports, television, politics, etc. To justify the parody, the narrative is set immediately after the last voyage written by Swift (precisely, 1722), and the literary style of the original work is kept throughout the whole story.
- In 2019 Canadian writer Brett Wiens published On Swift Wings: The Travails of Cygnus, a modern update to Gulliver's Travels. The islands and their inhabitants are retained, but have evolved three hundred years since and based upon their interaction with Gulliver. The literary style and voice of the original is retained throughout the story while a modern character, Cygnus, interacts with the same islands and their unique cultures. The sardonic satire is updated to reflect and vex modern society.

== Literary criticism ==
- Isaac Asimov wrote The Annotated Gulliver's Travels in 1980 (New York: Potter).

== Adaptations ==
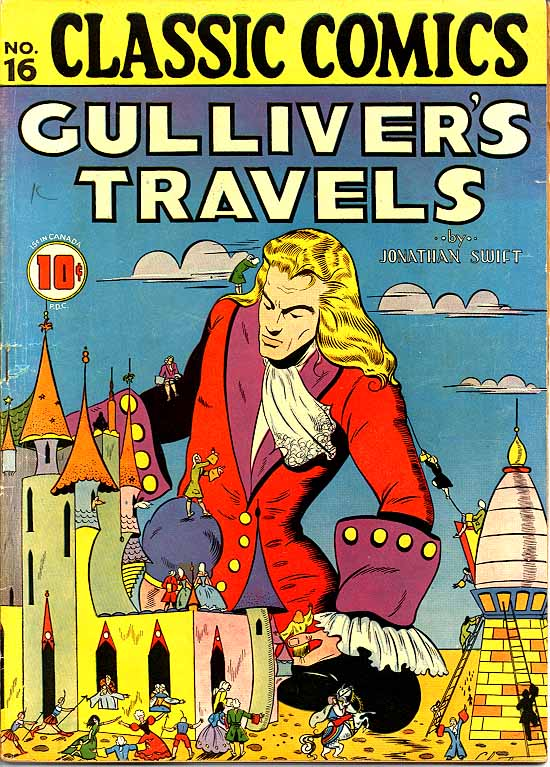
Comic book cover by Lilian Chesney

=== Music ===
- In 1728 the Baroque composer Georg Philipp Telemann composed a 5-movement suite for two violins based on Swift's book. Telemann's piece is commonly known as Gulliver's Travels, and depicts the Lilliputians and the Brobdingnagians particularly vividly through rhythms and tempos. The piece is part of Telemann's Der getreue Musik-meister (The Steadfast Music Teacher).
- English progressive rock band The Yellow Moon Band named their 2009 album Travels into Several Remote Nations of the World.
- Canadian dark ambient band Soufferance based and themed their 2010 concept album on the book. Titled Travels into Several Remote Nations of the Mind, the album features a single 65-minute song which bears the title The Thoughts and Memoirs of Mike Lachaire, First a Strange Individual, and then a Philosopher, referencing the full title of the original book.
- Polygondwanaland, the 2017-released 13th studio album by King Gizzard and the Lizard Wizard, draws many connections among thematic interpretations throughout the book and album.
- Spanish progressive rock band Northern Lights named their 2021 album Travels Into Several Remote Nations Of The Brain.

=== Radio ===
Brian Gulliver's Travels is a satirical comedy series and also a novel created and written by Bill Dare, first broadcast on 21 February 2011 on BBC Radio 4. A second series first broadcast on 25 June 2012 on BBC Radio 4 Extra. The series is a modern pastiche of the Jonathan Swift novel Gulliver's Travels.

=== Film and TV ===
==== English-language Live-action films and television series ====
Gulliver's Travels has been adapted several times for film, television and radio. Most film versions avoid the satire completely, and primary aim them at children.

===== Theatrical Films =====
- The Three Worlds of Gulliver (1960): a loose adaptation starring Kerwin Mathews and featuring stop motion effects by Ray Harryhausen.
- Gulliver's Travels (1977): Part live-action and part-animated. Stars Richard Harris.
- Gulliver's Travels (2010): Modernized, live-action version of Gulliver's adventures in Lilliput, starring Jack Black, also featuring Billy Connolly, James Corden, Amanda Peet, Chris O'Dowd, Catherine Tate, Jason Segel, Emily Blunt and Olly Alexander.

===== Television =====
- Gulliver in Lilliput (1981): BBC Classics Television. Stars Andrew Burt and Elisabeth Sladen.
- Gulliver's Travels (1996): Live-action, 2 part, TV miniseries with special effects starring Ted Danson and Mary Steenburgen, also featuring a variety of film stars in cameo roles. This adaption features all four voyages
- Crayola Kids Adventures: Tales of Gulliver's Travels (1997): Live-action direct-to-video film starring children with Adam Wylie as Gulliver.
- Land of the Giants (1968): A series about seven Earthlings traveling through a space warp to a planet similar to Earth but, as with the Brobdingnagian section of "Gulliver", everyone and everything is twelve times normal size.

==== English-language Animated films and television series ====
===== Theatrical films =====
- Gulliver Mickey (1934): is a black and white Mickey Mouse short, produced by Walt Disney and released by United Artists in 1934.
- Gulliver's Travels (1939): Max Fleischer's animated feature film classic of Gulliver's adventures in Lilliput. This was the second animated feature film made by an American studio (Walt Disney's Snow White and the Seven Dwarfs was the first). The film was spun off into two cartoon short series: the Gabby cartoons about a Lilliputian sidekick of the film, and the Animated Antics cartoons starring Sneak, Snoop and Snitch (the three villains) and Twinkletoes (the carrier pigeon).

===== Television films and series =====
- The Adventures of Gulliver (1968): a 17-episode animated television series by Hanna-Barbera which loosely adapts the novel's Lilliput chapter.
- Gulliver's Travels (1979): An animated TV movie adaptation of the first two parts made in Australia. It was produced by Southern Star Group for Famous Classic Tales, with the voice cast being Julie Bennett, Regis Cordic, Ross Martin, Don Messick, Hal Smith, John Stephenson, and Janet Waldo.
- Saban’s Gulliver’s Travels: A 26 episode long cartoon adaptation of the book produced by Saban Entertainment and Saban International Paris, which aired from September 8, 1992 to June 29, 1993.
- Gulliver's Travels was produced by Golden Films. This is an animated short version of the story and is part of a larger series known as "Enchanted Tales".

==== Foreign-language films and television series ====
===== Live-action films and television =====
- Guliver's Travels Among the Lilliputians and the Giants (1902): A French silent film by Georges Méliès, a pioneer of early film. Gulliver is played by Méliès himself in this version.
- Gulliver en el país de los Gigantes (1903) - spanish short film in silent
- Gulliver's Travels (1924) - Austrian silent adventure film directed by Géza von Cziffra
- The New Gulliver (1935): this Soviet retelling of the travel to Lilliput was lauded for the ground-breaking animation work by director Aleksandr Ptushko.
- Case for a Rookie Hangman (1970): A satirical movie by the Czech Pavel Juráček, based upon the third book, depicting indirectly the Communist Czechoslovakia, shelved soon after its release.
- Gulliver a törpék országában (1974): Directed by András Rajnai for Hungarian Television film (MTV), this show deals with the trip to Lilliput.
- Rani Aur Lalpari (lit. 'Rani and the Red Fairy'), a 1975 Indian children's fantasy film by Ravikant Nagaich features Gulliver as one of the characters - portrayed by actor Feroz Khan.
- Gulliver az óriások országában (1980): The second adaptation by András Rajnai for Hungarian Television (MTV), this hour-long show is an adaptation of Gulliver's voyage to Brobdingnag.
- Jajantaram Mamantaram (2003): Live-action Indian children's film, starring Javed Jaffrey.

===== Animated films =====
- Gulliver's Travels Beyond the Moon (1965) - Japanese anime
- Los Viajes de Gulliver (1983): A Spanish animated adaptation depicting Gulliver's adventures in Brobdingnag.
- Gulliver's Travel is a 2005 Indian English-language 3D-animated film directed by Anita Udeep and produced by the Pentamedia Graphics animation studio.
- Gulliver Returns is a 2021 Ukrainian English-language 3D-animated film depicting Gulliver's return to Lilliput.
