= List of public domain works with multimedia adaptations =

Following is a list of public domain works with multimedia adaptations. This lists includes works for which installments exist in multiple forms of media, such as books, comic books, films, television series, and video games. Multimedia franchises usually develop through a character or fictional world becoming popular in one medium, and then expanding to others through licensing agreements, with respect to intellectual property in the franchise's characters and settings. With respect to public domain works, however, adaptations or extensions of the original work may be done without the permission of the author.

To qualify for purposes of this list, the original media must have originated from the work of an identifiable author or set of co-authors, and must have been adapted into works in at least three forms of media, and must have two or more separate works in at least two of those forms of media (a television series or comic book series is considered a single work for purposes of this list; multiple spin-off series or remakes of a previously ended series are considered multiple works). For example, a novel that spawned one film and one television series would not qualify; a series of novels made into a television series that had a spin-off series, or was remade as a new series, and which also spawned one film, does qualify.

All of these works arise in literature, because there are far fewer works in any other media in the public domain. Although many historical figures (such as Abraham Lincoln, Julius Caesar, and Giacomo Casanova) and historical events (such as the sinking of the Titanic) have been portrayed in multiple media, with fictionalized elements, these people and events are not themselves "works", and therefore do not fall within the scope of this list.

== Table ==
Note: This list excludes myth legends and fairy tales with no known author. Also, note that the works of the original author might be fully or partly in the public domain.

Subject (Creator)	Original literary work	Comic books	Animated films	Live action films	Animated TV series	Live action TV series	Video games	Other media
Alice in Wonderland (Lewis Carroll)	Alice's Adventures in Wonderland (1865) numerous adaptations and sequels	various	several, most famously the 1951 Disney adaptation	several	several	several	several	–
Anne Shirley (Lucy Maud Montgomery)	Anne of Green Gables' (1908); Anne of Avonlea (1909)	no	no	Anne of Green Gables (1985 film); L.M. Montgomery's Anne of Green Gables (2016)	Anne of Green Gables (1979 TV series)	Anne of Green Gables (miniseries) (1972)	no	Anne with an E (2017); Anne of Green Gables: The Musical (1965-)
Allan Quatermain (H. Rider Haggard)	King Solomon's Mines (1885) numerous sequels	Classics Illustrated #97; Allan and the Sundered Veil (1999)	yes	various	no	yes	no	The League of Extraordinary Gentlemen; The Devil's Dust (2018)
Barsoom (Edgar Rice Burroughs)	Under the Moons of Mars (1912 serial); A Princess of Mars (1917); numerous sequels	several	no	Princess of Mars (2009); John Carter (2012)	no	no	no	-
Black Beauty (Anna Sewell)	Black Beauty (1877)	Classics Illustrated #60 (1949)	Black Beauty (1978 film)	Black Beauty (1971 film), Black Beauty (1994 film)	Black Beauty (1978), Black Beauty (1987 film)	The Adventures of Black Beauty (1972)	no	Black Beauty According to Spike Milligan (1996)
A Christmas Carol (Charles Dickens)	A Christmas Carol (1843)	several	several	several	several	several	several	several
Count Dracula (Bram Stoker)	Dracula (1897); Makt Myrkranna (1901); Powers of Darkness (2017)	various	yes	numerous	yes	yes	yes	Role-playing games; character and settings have been adopted into many other media/franchises
Five Children and It (E. Nesbit)	Five Children and It (1902)	yes	yes	yes	yes	yes	yes	yes
Frankenstein's monster (Mary Shelley)	Frankenstein (1818)	various	yes	numerous	yes	yes	yes	Role-playing games; character and settings have been adopted into many other media/franchises
Gulliver's Travels (Jonathan Swift)	Gulliver's Travels (1726); Voyage to Faremido (1916)	Classic Comics #16 (1943)	Gulliver's Travels Beyond the Moon (1965)	The 3 Worlds of Gulliver (1960); Gulliver's Travels (2010 film)	The Adventures of Gulliver (1968); Saban's Gulliver's Travels (1992)	Gulliver's Travels (miniseries) (1996)	no	Brian Gulliver's Travels (2011) and various
The Hunchback of Notre-Dame (Victor Hugo)	The Hunchback of Notre-Dame (1831)	various	The Hunchback of Notre Dame (1996 film)	The Hunchback of Notre Dame (1956 film)	The Magical Adventures of Quasimodo	The Hunchback of Notre Dame (1966 TV series); The Hunchback of Notre Dame (1982 film)	Hunchback (video game) (1982)	various
Journey to the Center of the Earth (Jules Verne)	Journey to the Center of the Earth (1864)	Classic Comics #138	no	Journey to the Center of the Earth (1959 film); Journey to the Center of the Earth (2008 film)	Journey to the Center of the Earth (TV series)	Journey to the Center of the Earth (2008 TV film)	A Journey to the Centre of the Earth (1984 video game) in 1989 by Topo Soft for the ZX Spectrum and in 2003 by Frogwares.	Journey to the Center of the Earth (attraction) and several radioplays
The Jungle Book (Rudyard Kipling)	The Jungle Book (1894); The Second Jungle Book (1895)	yes	most notably The Jungle Book (1967)	several	Adventures of Mowgli (1967–1971)	no	The Jungle Book (1993)	Radio show, stage plays
Peter Pan (J. M. Barrie)	The Little White Bird (1902); character appears in a segment); Peter and Wendy (1911) numerous adaptations	various	Walt Disney's Peter Pan (1953); various others	various	Peter Pan and the Pirates (1990); various others	no	several	Peter Pan's Flight (theme park ride); various stage plays
Peter Rabbit (Beatrix Potter)	The Tale of Peter Rabbit (1902) and several sequels	no	Peter Rabbit (2018) and Peter Rabbit 2: The Runaway (2021)	The Tales of Beatrix Potter (1971); Peter Rabbit (2018) and Peter Rabbit 2: The Runaway (2021)	The World of Peter Rabbit and Friends (1992) Peter Rabbit (2012)	no	The Adventures of Peter Rabbit & Benjamin Bunny in 1995 and Beatrix Potter: Peter Rabbit's Math Garden in 1996.	Miss Potter (2006); HBO Storybook Musicals (1991) and in 2012 Quantum Theatre produced a new stage adaptation of the tales of Peter Rabbit and Benjamin Bunny. Written by Michael Whitmore the play toured the UK until 2015.
Sexton Blake (Harry Blyth)	The Missing Millionaire (1893)	yes	no	yes	no	yes	no	Sexton Blake#Stage; Sexton Blake#Radio
Sítio do Picapau Amarelo (Monteiro Lobato)	A Menina do Narizinho Arrebitado (1920); As Reinações de Narizinho (1931) several sequels	yes	no	O Saci (1953); O Picapau Amarelo (1973)	Sítio do Picapau Amarelo (2012)	several	yes	-
Sherlock Holmes (Arthur Conan Doyle)	four novels and 56 short stories, beginning in 1887	various	no	numerous	Sherlock Holmes in the 22nd Century (1999–2001)	various	several	–
Tarzan (Edgar Rice Burroughs)	Tarzan of the Apes (1912) twenty-three other books by Edgar Rice Burroughs; various adaptations by other authors	Tarzan (comics)	several	numerous	Tarzan, Lord of the Jungle (1976–1984) various others	Tarzan (1966–1968) various others	several	Stage productions, radio programs, and other media.
The Three Musketeers (Alexandre Dumas)	The Three Musketeers (1844)	Classics Illustrated #1 (1941)	several	several	several	several	several	several
Tom Brown's School Days (Thomas Hughes)	Tom Brown's School Days (1857); Tom Brown at Oxford (1859)	Classics Illustrated #45 (1948)	no	several	several	no	no	Stage productions, radio programs, The Flashman Papers (1969–2005) George MacDonald Fraser
Tom Sawyer (Mark Twain)	The Adventures of Tom Sawyer (1876) several other books	Classics Illustrated #50 and several others	several	several	several	several	no	several
Treasure Island (Robert Louis Stevenson)	Treasure Island (1881)	yes	yes	yes	yes	yes	yes	Stage
The War of the Worlds (H. G. Wells)	The War of the Worlds (1898) and various sequels	various adaptations	no	The War of the Worlds (1953); War of the Worlds (2005) and various others	no	War of the Worlds (1988–1990)	various	The War of the Worlds radio serial (1938); Jeff Wayne's Musical Version of The War of the Worlds (1978 concept album and 2000s stage production) and many others
The Wind in the Willows (Kenneth Grahame)	The Wind in the Willows (1908)	Papercutz #1 (2008)	The Adventures of Ichabod and Mr. Toad (1949) several others	The Wind in the Willows (1996 film)	The Wind in the Willows (TV series)	The Wind in the Willows (2006 film)	The Wind in the Willows (1992) Leisureland	Toad of Toad Hall; Wind in the Willows (musical)
The Wonderful Wizard of Oz (L. Frank Baum)	The Wonderful Wizard of Oz (1900)	several	several	several, including The Wizard of Oz (1939)	several	several	several	several
Winnie-the-Pooh (A. A. Milne)	When We Were Very Young (1924); Winnie the Pooh and The House at Pooh Corner; Featured in two others	no	various	Christopher Robin (2018) and Winnie-the-Pooh: Blood and Honey (2023); Outside of these films, not primarily. A bit of live-action was used in some of the animated films.	various	yes	various	Consisted of audio stories, specials, songs and theme rides, etc. See also the Disney franchise.
Wuthering Heights (Emily Brontë)	Wuthering Heights (1847)	Classics Illustrated #59	several	several	several	several	no	several

== See also ==
- List of multimedia franchises
- List of fictional shared universes in film and television
- Expanded universe
- Fictional universe
- Literary adaptation
- Spin-off (media)
- Classics Illustrated#Issues
