= Gulliver's Travels (disambiguation) =

Gulliver's Travels is a book by Jonathan Swift.

Gulliver's Travels may also refer to:

- Gulliver's Travels Among the Lilliputians and the Giants, a 1902 French silent film directed by Georges Méliès
- Gulliver's Travels (1924 film), a 1924 Austrian silent adventure film
- The New Gulliver, a 1935 Soviet film
- Gulliver's Travels (1939 film), an animated film
- Gulliver's Travels (1977 film), starring Richard Harris
- Saban's Gulliver's Travels, a 1992 TV series
- Gulliver's Travels, a 1996 animated film by Golden Films
- Gulliver's Travels (miniseries), a 1996 miniseries starring Ted Danson
- Gulliver's Travels (2010 film), starring Jack Black
- Gulliver's Travels, a 1999 radio adaptation in the Radio Tales series
- Travels into Several Remote Nations of the World (album), a 2009 album by The Yellow Moon Band

== See also ==
- Brian Gulliver's Travels, a satirical radio series starring Neil Pearson
- Gulliver's Travels Beyond the Moon
- Gulliver's Travels#Adaptations
- The 3 Worlds of Gulliver, a 1960 film loosely based on the novel, also known as Gulliver's Travels
