= Acrobunch =

Japanese anime television series

- Screenshot of Acrobunch from the television series

魔境伝説アクロバンチ (Makyō Densetsu Akurobanchi)
- Genre: Mecha
- Created by: Yu Yamamoto
- Anime television series
- Directed by: Ryō Yasumura (chief); Takao Yotsuji (#1–12); Takashi Hisaoka (#13–24)
- Produced by: Juzo Tsubota
- Written by: Yu Yamamoto
- Music by: Masahito Maruyama
- Studio: Kokusai Eiga-sha
- Licensed by: NA: Discotek Media
- Original network: Nippon Television
- Original run: May 5, 1982 – December 24, 1982
- Episodes: 24

Acrobunch (魔境伝説アクロバンチ, Makyō Densetsu Akurobanchi; lit. "Acrobunch: The Legend of the Demon Lands" and officially named "Acrobunch in Devil-Land" in English) is a mecha anime series aired in 1982. There were 24 episodes. It is also referred to as "Demon Region Legendary Acrobunch", "Demon Regions Legend Acrobunch", "Ruins Legend Acrobunch" and "Acrobanch".

The series has a treasure hunting theme, with its heroes and villains searching for the treasure of Quetzalcoatl.

== Story ==
Led by scientist Tatsuya Randou, the treasure hunting Randou family undertakes a journey around the globe in order to search out ancient ruins to uncover the legend of Quetzalcoatl, which unlocks the key to a fabulous treasure. However, tailing the Randou family is Goblin, an evil organisation that covets the legendary treasure for itself. The Randou family has the secret weapon, the super robot Acrobunch. It becomes a race around the world of who finds the treasure first.

== Concept ==
Acrobunch was an anime pushed out to capitalize on the archeological adventure craze that was occurring in Hollywood at the time, exemplified by the 1981 release of Raiders of the Lost Ark. The art for this series was impressive and the combination sequence of Acrobunch still remains exceptional to this day, setting the benchmark for the rest of the 1980s. Five separate vehicles combine to form the super robot Acrobunch. The parts contain 2 motorcycles which form the arms, 2 racecars form the legs, 1 plane form the body.

The series achieved some popularity in France, where it debuted on TV in 1985 and is known by differing titles including L'Empire des Cinq and Askadis - La Légende de l'empire perdu. The French dubbed version changed the names of the lead characters as well as the Acrobunch robot itself (becoming "Thorn-Rock"), and also changed the setting of the series from Japan to Canada.

Discotek Media released Acrobunch on standard definition Blu-ray disc for North American audiences on February 23, 2021.

== Production ==
Writing in the third edition of The Anime Encyclopedia (2015), Jonathan Clements and Helen McCarthy characterized Acrobunch as a troubled production, noting that it was repeatedly moved between broadcast slots and two production studios.

== Staff ==
- Original Work: Yu Yamamoto
- Chief director: Ryō Yasumura
- Series directors: Takao Yotsuji, Takashi Hisaoka
- Screenwriters: Yu Yamamoto, Akira Goto, Haruya Yamazaki, Takeshi Shudo
- Episode directors: Masakazu Yasumura, Takashi Hisaoka, Takao Yotsuji (credited as "Yoshinori Natsuki"), Hiromichi Matano, Kazuhiro Ochi, Hideki Takayama
- Art: Makoto Sato (first half of series), Toshikazu Yamaguchi (second half of series)
- Character Design: Mutsumi Inomata, Shigenori Kageyama
- Music: Masahito Maruyama
- Opening theme ("Yume no Karyudo"): Yu Yamamoto (lyrics), Masayuki Yamamoto (composition/arrangement), Yukio Yamagata (singer)
- Ending theme ("Nagisa ni Hitori"): Yu Yamamoto (lyrics), Masayuki Yamamoto (composition/arrangement), Isao Taira (singer)

== Characters ==
Japanese Name	Voiced by
Jun Randou (蘭堂 ジュン Randō Jun)	Shigeru Nakahara
Tatsuya Randou (蘭堂 タツヤ Randō Tatsuya)	Hidekatsu Shibata
Reika Randou (蘭堂 レイカ Randō Reika)	Kazuko Sugiyama
Ryou Randou (蘭堂 リョウ Randō Ryō)	Akio Nojima (episodes 1–9, 13, 16–24); Hideyuki Tanaka (episodes 10–12, 14–15)
Miki Randou (蘭堂 ミキ Randō Miki)	Katsue Miwa
Hiro Randou (蘭堂 ヒロ Randō Hiro)	Norio Wakamoto
D.B	Kiyomi Kurakawa
R.C	Hitoshi Kubota
King Deros	Seizō Katō

Shigeru Nakahara made his debut as a voice actor with this series, in the role of the youngest Randou child, Jun.

Enoki Films gave the main character the name David Owen. In the French version, Tatsuya Randou is known as Professor Kossig and his five children's names are also changed, to sons Quentin (Ryo), Antoine (Jun) and Mathieu (Hiro) and daughters Ulrich (Reika) and Jill (Miki). In the North American broadcast version, the Owen family, the main character of this work (the Randou family in the original final draft), is made up of the following six people. Father...David, Eldest son...Peter, Second son...Will, twin sisters (Eldest daughter...Jenny, second daughter...Betty), Third son...Michael.

== Episodes ==
No.	Title	Directed by	Written by	Original release date
1	"Searching For a Large Treasure" "Daihiho wo Motomete" (Japanese: 大秘宝を求めて)	Masakazu Yasumura	Yu Yamamoto	May 5, 1982
2	"The Snowy and Icy Mountain's Mysterious Light" "Hyosetsusan no Kaiko" (Japanese: 氷雪山の怪光)	Directed by : Ten Shimura; Storyboarded by : Akira Yokoi	Yu Yamamoto	May 12, 1982
3	"The Underground Sanctuary's Curse" "Noroi no Chikahoden" (Japanese: 呪いの地下宝殿)	Directed by : Joji Kikuchi, Katsumi To; Storyboarded by : Mari Oda	Yu Yamamoto	June 2, 1982
4	"The Mysterious Ocean Floor God Statue" "Nazo no Kaiteishinzo" (Japanese: 謎の海底神像)	Directed by : Renji Kawabata; Storyboarded by : Masakazu Yasumura	Yu Yamamoto	June 9, 1982
5	"The Treasure of the Large Congo Jungle" "Daimitsurin Congo no Hiho" (Japanese: 大密林コンゴの秘宝)	Directed by : Tatsuya Kishi; Storyboarded by : Takashi Sogabe	Yu Yamamoto	June 30, 1982
6	"The Destruction of Atlantis" "Metsubo no Atorantisu" (Japanese: 滅亡のアトランティス)	Masakazu Yasumura	Yu Yamamoto	July 7, 1982
7	"The Phantom of the Megalithic Temple" "Kyoseki Shinden no Kaijin" (Japanese: 巨石神殿の怪人)	Directed by : Hiro Takamura; Storyboarded by : Ren Matsutoya	Akira Goto	July 14, 1982
8	"The Maiden of Enme Ya" "Enme Ya no Otome" (Japanese: エンメ・ヤの乙女)	Kozo Takagaki	Akira Goto	July 30, 1982
9	"Howl, Griffin" "Hoeyo, Gurifon" (Japanese: 吼えよグリフォン)	Directed by : Tatsuya Kishi; Storyboarded by : Katsumi Jun	Haruya Yamazaki	August 4, 1982
10	"The Festival of Faeries" "Yoseitachi no Matsuri" (Japanese: 妖精達の祭り)	Kozo Takagaki	Takeshi Shudo	August 30, 1982
11	"The Sabah Royal Palace's Disappointed Love" "Hiren no Sabaokyu" (Japanese: 悲恋のサバ王宮)	Kazuhiro Ochi	Akira Goto	September 8, 1982
12	"The Distant Aegean Area" "Harukanaru Eege" (Japanese: はるかなるエーゲ)	Directed by : Tatsuya Kishi; Storyboarded by : Masakazu Yasumura	Yu Yamamoto	September 22, 1982
13	"First Half - Special Collection Chapter: The Mysterious Large Treasure of Quaschika" "Zenpan - Tokubetsu Soshuhen: Nazo no Daihiho Kuwasuchika" (Japanese: 前半・特別総集編 謎の大秘宝クワスチカ)	Takashi Hisaoka	Yu Yamamoto	October 8, 1982
14	"The Illusion of Babylon" "Maboroshi no Babiron" (Japanese: 幻しのバビロン)	Directed by : Tatsuya Kishi; Storyboarded by : Shigenori Kageyama	Yu Yamamoto	October 15, 1982
15	"The Legend of the Arctic Ocean" "Hokkyokukai no Densetsu" (Japanese: 北極海の伝説)	Directed by : Kozo Takagaki; Storyboarded by : Ren Matsutoya	Haruya Yamazaki	October 22, 1982
16	"Splendid Revenge" "Kareinaru Fukushu" (Japanese: 華麗なる復讐)	Hiromichi Matano	Akira Goto	October 29, 1982
17	"The Mysterious Angkor Wat" "Nazo no Ankooru Watto" (Japanese: 謎のアンコール・ワット)	Hiromichi Matano	Akira Hatta	November 5, 1982
18	"Mt. Shari's War Cry" "Sharisan no Osakebi" (Japanese: シャーリ山の雄叫び)	Directed by : Keiji Namisato; Storyboarded by : Hideki Takayama	Akira Goto	November 12, 1982
19	"Battle of the Gobi Desert" "Gobi Sabaku no Gekisen" (Japanese: ゴビ砂漠の激戦)	Directed by : Kazuya Miyazaki; Storyboarded by : Hiroyuki Ikeda	Haruya Yamazaki	November 19, 1982
20	"Death Match! Love's Illusion" "Shito! Ai no Maboroshi" (Japanese: 死闘! 愛のまぼろし)	Directed by : Keiji Namisato; Storyboarded by : Takashi Hisaoka	Yu Yamamoto	November 26, 1982
21	"The Decisive Battle of St. Shambala" "Seishanbara no Kessen" (Japanese: 聖シャンバラの決戦)	Hiromichi Matano	Yu Yamamoto	December 3, 1982
22	"Challenge! Hunter of Dreams (First Part)" "Chosen! Yume no Karyudo (Zenpen)" (Japanese: 挑戦! 夢の狩人(前編))	Directed by : Keiji Namisato; Storyboarded by : Hideki Takayama	Yu Yamamoto	December 10, 1982
23	"Quaschika's Mysterious Appearance (Second Part)" "Kuwasuchika Shutsugen no Nazo (Chuhen)" (Japanese: クワスチカ出現の謎(中編))	Hiromichi Matano	Yu Yamamoto	December 17, 1982
24	"Dreams From Far Away (Latter Part)" "Yumeyo Haruka ni (Kohen)" (Japanese: 夢よはるかに(後編))	Takashi Hisaoka	Yu Yamamoto	December 24, 1982

== Merchandise ==
The Acrobunch robot was released as "Acrobunch Kyoui Gatti 5 DX" / "Acrobunch Wonder Combo 5 DX" by Poplar and Royal Condor. It is built with diecast metals, and the package comes with a number of pieces including motorcycle stops, plane landing gears, airfoils, guns, swords, stickers, missiles, fists. The US and Taiwan release is especially rare since it was considered 20% smaller, and the label for the toy was "Pentabot" instead of "Acrobunch". It may have been sold outside Japan as such due to lack of licensing of the anime name title.

Due to the popularity of the anime in France, the Acrobunch robot was also released there under the name "Thorn-Rock," the same name given the robot in the French dub of the anime.

== Legacy ==
Clements and McCarthy highlighted the series' significance as an early assignment for several anime creators who subsequently became prominent. Acrobunch marked the first anime assignment of Rei Nakahara, who later worked on Tekkaman Blade. Among its animators, Yutaka Arai subsequently worked on City Hunter, Kazuhiro Ochi on Hikarian, and Hideki Takayama became the director of Urotsukidōji. The authors also observed similarities between Mutsumi Inomata's character designs for Acrobunch and her later work on Brain Powerd.
