= Novel adaptation =

Novel adaptation may refer to:

- Literary adaptation, the adaptation of a literary work (e.g., a novel) into another work
- Novelization, the adaptation of another work into a novel
