= Lists of multimedia franchises =

A multimedia franchise (or a transmedia franchise) is a media franchise for which installments exist in multiple forms of media, such as books, comics, films, television series, animated series and video games. Multimedia franchises usually develop due to the popularization of an original creative work, and then its expansion to other media through licensing agreements, with respect to intellectual property in the franchise's characters and settings, although the trend later developed wherein franchises would be launched in multiple forms of media simultaneously.

In order to qualify for these lists, a franchise must have works in at least three forms of media, and must have two or more separate works in at least two of those forms of media (a television series or comic book series is considered a single work for purposes of this list; multiple spin-off series or reboots of a previously ended series are considered multiple works). For example, a television series that spawned one film and one novelization would not qualify; a television series that had a spin-off series, or was remade as a new series, and which spawned two films and one novelization does qualify. These lists do not include public domain works from which adaptations have been made in multiple media only after the works entered the public domain, which do not involve licensing or other means by which an author or owner controls the franchise. A franchise may be included if it obtained multimedia franchise status prior to works within the collection entering the public domain. Following are lists of multimedia franchises, divided by media characteristics.

== Print publications ==
=== Literary works ===
- A Song of Ice and Fire
- Arthur
- American Psycho
- Babar
- Berenstain Bears
- Blade Runner
- Captain Underpants
- The Cat in the Hat
- The Chronicles of Narnia
- Clifford the Big Red Dog
- Caillou
- The Chinese Siamese Cat
- Conan the Barbarian
- Curious George
- Die Hard
- Discworld
- Diary of a Wimpy Kid
- Dune
- Ender's Game
- Fast & Furious
- Gidget
- Goosebumps
- Greyfriars School
- The Godfather
- Hannibal Lecter
- Harry Potter
- Haruhi Suzumiya
- Hercule Poirot
- Herbie
- His Dark Materials
- Harold and the Purple Crayon
- How to Train Your Dragon
- The Hunger Games
- James Bond
- Jason Bourne
- Jennings
- Jumanji
- Jurassic Park
- Left Behind
- Legend of the Galactic Heroes
- Mary Poppins
- Megami Tensei
- Miss Marple
- Monogatari
- Moomins
- Mr. Men
- One Hundred and One Dalmatians
- Paddington Bear
- Parasite Eve
- Perry Mason
- Peter Rabbit
- Planet of the Apes
- Professor Branestawm
- Psycho
- The Railway Series/Thomas & Friends
- Rambo
- Robert Langdon
- Rudolph the Red-Nosed Reindeer
- Sex and the City
- Shrek
- Starship Troopers
- Sword Art Online
- Middle-earth
- Tales of Arcadia
- Tom Clancy media
- Top Gun
- The Vampire Chronicles
- Wicked
- Winnie-the-Pooh
- The Witcher

=== Comics ===
- 300
- The Addams Family
- Alien vs. Predator
- Archie Comics
- Ashita no Joe
- Asterix
- Attack on Titan
- The Bad Guys
- Bleach
- Buck Rogers
- DC Universe
- Dennis the Menace (US)
- Death Note
- Detective Conan
- Doraemon
- Dragon Ball
- Dyesebel
- Fullmetal Alchemist
- Garfield
- Gaston
- Ghost in the Shell
- Hellboy
- Initial D
- Josie and the Pussycats
- Judge Dredd
- Kick-Ass
- Lucky Luke
- Lupin the Third
- Marsupilami
- The Mask
- Marvel Universe
- Men in Black
- Miffy
- My Hero Academia
- Naruto/Boruto
- One Piece
- Patlabor
- Peanuts
- Popeye
- Ranma ½
- Sabrina the Teenage Witch
- Sailor Moon
- Sam & Max
- Saint Seiya
- Sgt. Frog
- The Smurfs
- Spawn
- Spirou & Fantasio
- Teenage Mutant Ninja Turtles
- Tintin
- Turok
- The Walking Dead
- Wangan Midnight
- Yu-Gi-Oh!

== Television and web series ==
=== Animated ===
- The Amazing World of Gumball
- Avatar: The Last Airbender
- American Dad!
- Adventure Time
- Alma's Way
- Beavis and Butt-Head
- Ben 10
- Blue's Clues
- Bluey
- Bob the Builder
- Dexter's Laboratory
- Dora the Explorer
- Dragon Tales
- Ed, Edd n Eddy
- The Flintstones
- Foster's Home for Imaginary Friends
- Futurama
- George of the Jungle
- Gumby
- Gundam
- The Loud House
- Masameer
- Miraculous Ladybug
- Neon Genesis Evangelion
- Paw Patrol
- The Powerpuff Girls
- Pretty Cure
- Rick and Morty
- Rocky and Bullwinkle
- Regular Show
- Rugrats
- RWBY
- Scooby-Doo
- The Simpsons
- South Park
- Space Battleship Yamato
- Space Ghost
- SpongeBob SquarePants
- Steven Universe
- VeggieTales
- Voltron
- Winx Club
- Yogi Bear

=== Live action ===
- Ali G
- The Avengers
- Babylon 5
- Barney
- Battlestar Galactica
- The Bill
- Black Mirror
- Blake's 7
- The Brady Bunch
- Between The Lions
- Gilligan's Island
- Charlie's Angels
- Dad's Army
- Doctor Who
- The Equalizer
- Fraggle Rock
- Kamen Rider
- Last of the Summer Wine
- Mission: Impossible
- Monty Python
- Mr. Bean
- The Muppets
- Metal Hero Series
- Only Fools and Horses
- Power Rangers/Super Sentai
- Project R.E.D.
- The Prisoner
- Quatermass
- Red Dwarf
- Sesame Street
- Star Trek
- Stranger Things
- The Sweeney
- The Twilight Zone
- Ultra Series
- The X-Files

== Films ==
=== Animated films ===
- An American Tail
- Cars
- Casper the Friendly Ghost
- Despicable Me
- Felix the Cat
- Finding Nemo
- Ice Age
- The Incredibles
- Inside Out
- Kung Fu Panda
- The Land Before Time
- Lilo & Stitch
- The Lion King
- Looney Tunes
- Madagascar
- Megamind
- Mickey Mouse and Friends
- Monsters, Inc.
- The Secret Life of Pets
- Tom and Jerry
- Toy Story
- Wallace & Gromit
- Woody Woodpecker

=== Live-action films ===
- Alien
- Back to the Future
- Beetlejuice
- Bill & Ted
- Buffyverse
- The Chronicles of Riddick / Pitch Black
- Clash of the Titans
- Evil Dead
- The Expendables
- Final Destination
- Flipper
- Ghostbusters
- Godzilla
- Gremlins
- Halloween
- High School Musical
- Highlander
- Indiana Jones
- The Karate Kid
- King Kong
- Marvel Cinematic Universe
- The Matrix
- MonsterVerse
- The Pink Panther
- Police Academy
- Predator
- RoboCop
- Rocky
- Saw
- Stargate
- Star Wars
- Terminator
- Tron
- Universal Monsters
- Westworld

== Games, toys, and merchandise ==
=== Video games, including film or television works ===
- Ace Attorney
- Alone in the Dark
- Animal Crossing
- Angry Birds
- Assassin's Creed
- Aikatsu!
- Bayonetta
- Bomberman
- Borderlands
- Carmen Sandiego
- Call of Duty
- Castlevania
- Chrono
- Crash Bandicoot
- Dante's Inferno
- Danganronpa
- Darkstalkers
- Dead or Alive
- Dead Rising
- Devil May Cry
- Donkey Kong
- Doom
- Dota
- Dragon Age
- Dragon's Lair
- Dragon Quest
- Drakengard
- Fallout
- Far Cry
- Fatal Frame
- Fatal Fury
- Final Fantasy
- Five Nights at Freddy's
- Fire Emblem
- God of War
- Grand Theft Auto
- Half-Life
- Hitman
- Kemono Friends
- Kingdom Hearts
- The King of Fighters
- Kirby
- League of Legends
- The Legend of Zelda
- Mario
- Mass Effect
- Max Payne
- Mega Man
- Minecraft
- Monster Hunter
- Mortal Kombat
- Pac-Man
- Pretty Rhythm
- Pokémon
- Prince of Persia
- Plants vs. Zombies
- Ratchet & Clank
- Rayman
- Red Dead
- Resident Evil
- Silent Hill
- Sonic the Hedgehog
- Onimusha
- Sekiro: Shadows Die Twice
- Star Ocean
- Street Fighter
- Tekken
- Talking Tom & Friends
- The Last of Us
- Tomb Raider
- Trails
- Uncharted
- Umamusume: Pretty Derby
- Xeno
- Warcraft
- Wing Commander
- Zone of the Enders
- Yo-kai Watch

=== Video games, excluding film or television works ===
- Alan Wake
- Banjo-Kazooie
- Battlefield
- Bioshock
- Bloodborne
- Cooking Mama
- Contra
- Crysis
- Darksiders
- Dead Island
- Destiny
- Deus Ex
- Diablo
- Dishonored
- Duke Nukem
- The Elder Scrolls
- The Evil Within
- Fable
- Fortnite
- Gears of War
- Guild Wars
- Infamous
- Just Cause
- Killzone
- Left 4 Dead
- Legacy of Kain
- Life Is Strange
- Metal Gear
- Metroid
- Myst
- The Oregon Trail
- Portal
- Quake
- Soulcalibur
- Splatoon
- StarCraft
- Suikoden
- Star Fox
- Thief
- Watch Dogs
- Wolfenstein
- Zork

=== Other games ===
- BattleTech
- Car Wars
- Cluedo
- Cyberpunk
- Dungeons & Dragons
- Glorantha
- Magic: The Gathering
- Mutant Chronicles
- Shadowrun
- Warhammer
- World of Darkness

=== Songs, albums, and theatre ===
- Alvin and the Chipmunks
- The Amory Wars
- BanG Dream!
- Captain Sabertooth
- Frosty the Snowman
- The Green Hornet
- Lone Ranger
- Madea
- The Wiggles

=== Toys, attractions, and other media ===
- American Girl
- Barbie
- Bratz
- Care Bears
- Digimon
- G.I. Joe
- Hello Kitty
- Lego
- Labubu
- Masters of the Universe
- My Little Pony
- The Odd Couple
- Pirates of the Caribbean
- Strawberry Shortcake
- Transformers
- Trolls

== See also ==
- Lists of fictional characters by work – many multimedia franchises are based in fictional universe
