= City Hunter (disambiguation) =

City Hunter is a Japanese manga series by Tsukasa Hojo.

City Hunter(s) may also refer to:

- City Hunter (1987 TV series), a Japanese anime television series based on the manga
- City Hunter (1993 film), a Hong Kong live-action film based on the manga
- City Hunter (2011 TV series), a South Korean television series based on the manga
- City Hunter (2024 film), a Japanese live-action film based on the manga
- City Hunters (TV series), an Argentine animated television series
- City Hunters (film), a 2019 Burmese action film
