= It's Jo and Danny =

British electronic/folk music duo

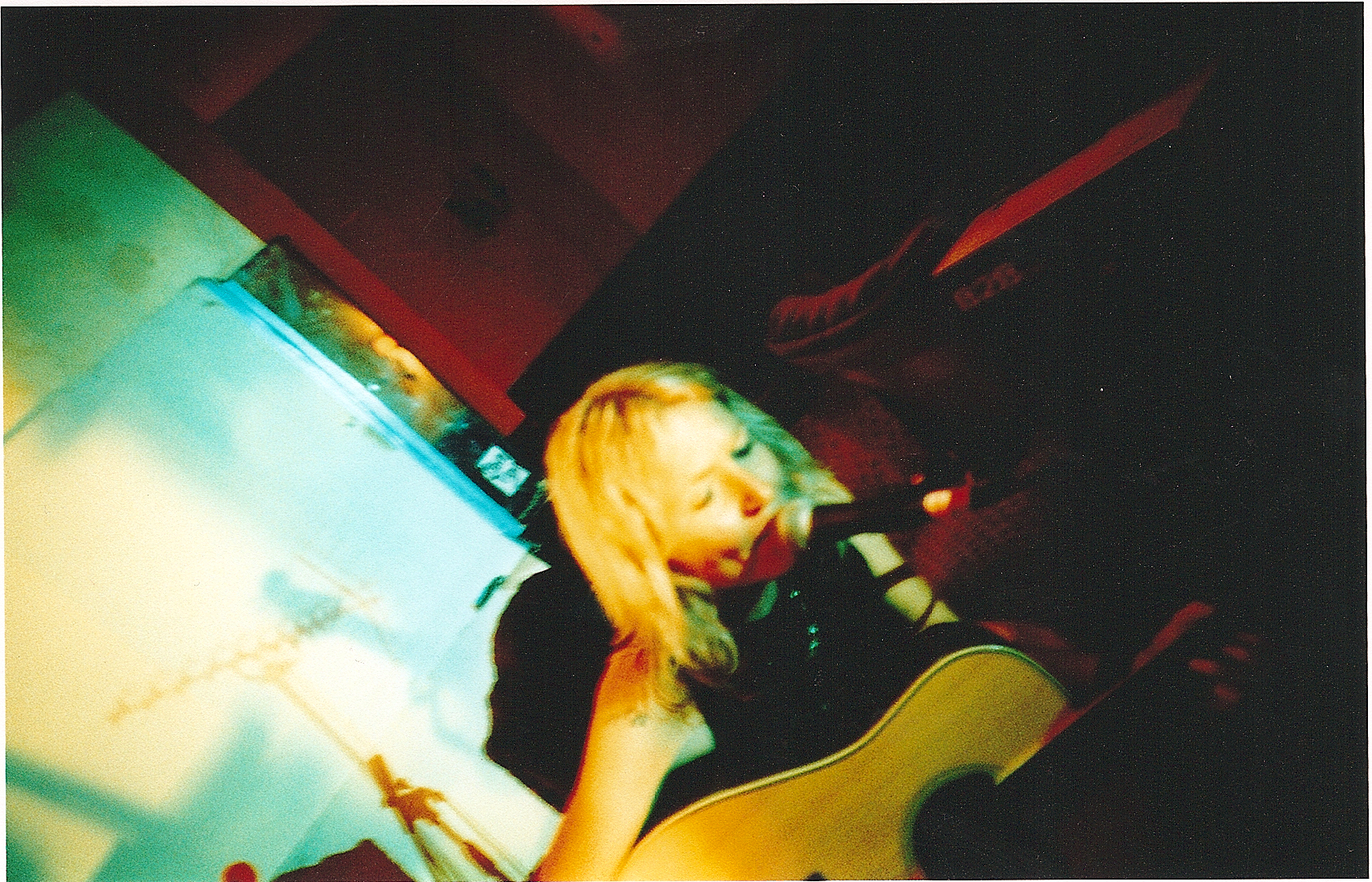
- Bartlett performs in Berlin, Germany

Background information
- Origin: United Kingdom
- Genres: Folktronica, dream pop indie
- Instrument(s): Guitar, vocals, bass synths
- Years active: 1999–2005
- Labels: RCA; Double Snazzy; Victor; Cherry Red; Kontext
- Website: https://indiethroughthelookingglass.com/lankhairedgirltobeardedboy/

It's Jo and Danny is the musical electronic / folk duo of Jo Bartlett and Danny Hagan. In 2000, they released their self produced debut album Lank Haired Girl to Bearded Boy on their own Double Snazzy label. Rave reviews and daytime UK national radio play on from Jo Whiley on her lunch time show on BBC Radio 1 led to a worldwide recording contract with RCA.

Their debut album ‘Lank Haired Girl To Bearded Boy’ received generally positive reviews

It's Jo and Danny only performed live 30 times. They used several different line ups, from just the two of them and a lap top for programmed beats to an eight piece band. Their debut gig was a sold out show at The Water Rats in London. This performance was attended by several major record companies and led to their deal with RCA. Live UK performances included appearances at the Glastonbury Festival, Reading and Leeds Festival and T in the Park, with international shows at Crossing Borders in Amsterdam with Emmylou Harris, and Les Inrockuptibles festival in Paris with Coldplay.

In 2003, they released But We Have the Music in the UK, Spain, Germany and Japan, and received Album of the Week in The Times. Jo and Danny toured Germany as a duo to promote the album's release on Kontext Records in 2004. Specially made films were projected over them while they performed. The Berlin show was attended by Michael Nyman who went back stage to congratulate them afterwards.

The Quickening was recorded with Scottish/Irish/Californian folk outfit Daimh along with other musicians and was released in 2005. Once again, it was critically well received and awarded four stars by Peter Paphides in The Times. This UK tour featured Mathew Priest from the band Dodgy on drums and Rudy Carroll on guitar. The four would later form The Yellow Moon Band.

In 2003 Jo and Danny founded the Green Man Festival in Wales, which they ran until they sold the festival, after the 2011 edition. They grew the festival from 350 attendees for one day in 2003 to 15,000 attendees for four days and nights in 2011.

== Discography ==
- Lank Haired Girl to Bearded Boy (2000)
- Thugs Lounge (2001)
- But We Have the Music (2003)
- The Quickening (2005)
