= Click (comics) =

1983–2002 erotic series by Milo Manara

Click!
- cover of U.S. edition of Click! #1

Publication information
- Publisher: Edizioni Nuova Frontiera; NBM Publishing
- Publication date: 1983–2002
- No. of issues: 4

Creative team
- Written by: Milo Manara
- Artist: Milo Manara

Click! is a series of erotic Italian comic books written and illustrated by comic book creator Milo Manara. It was first published in 1983 as Il gioco in the Italian Playmen and as Déclic in L'Écho des savanes in France. Three sequels have followed, in 1991, 1994 and 2001.

== Synopsis ==
The first volume features an attractive but passionless woman, Ms. Claudia Cristiani, who is married to an older, rich man. After she is abducted by a scientist and a remote-controlled device is surgically implanted into her brain, its activation makes her become sexually insatiable. The three sequels roughly follow a similar story.

== Adaptations ==
Il gioco was the basis for the 1985 French film, Le déclic.
