= Literary adaptation =

Adaptation of a literary work into another work

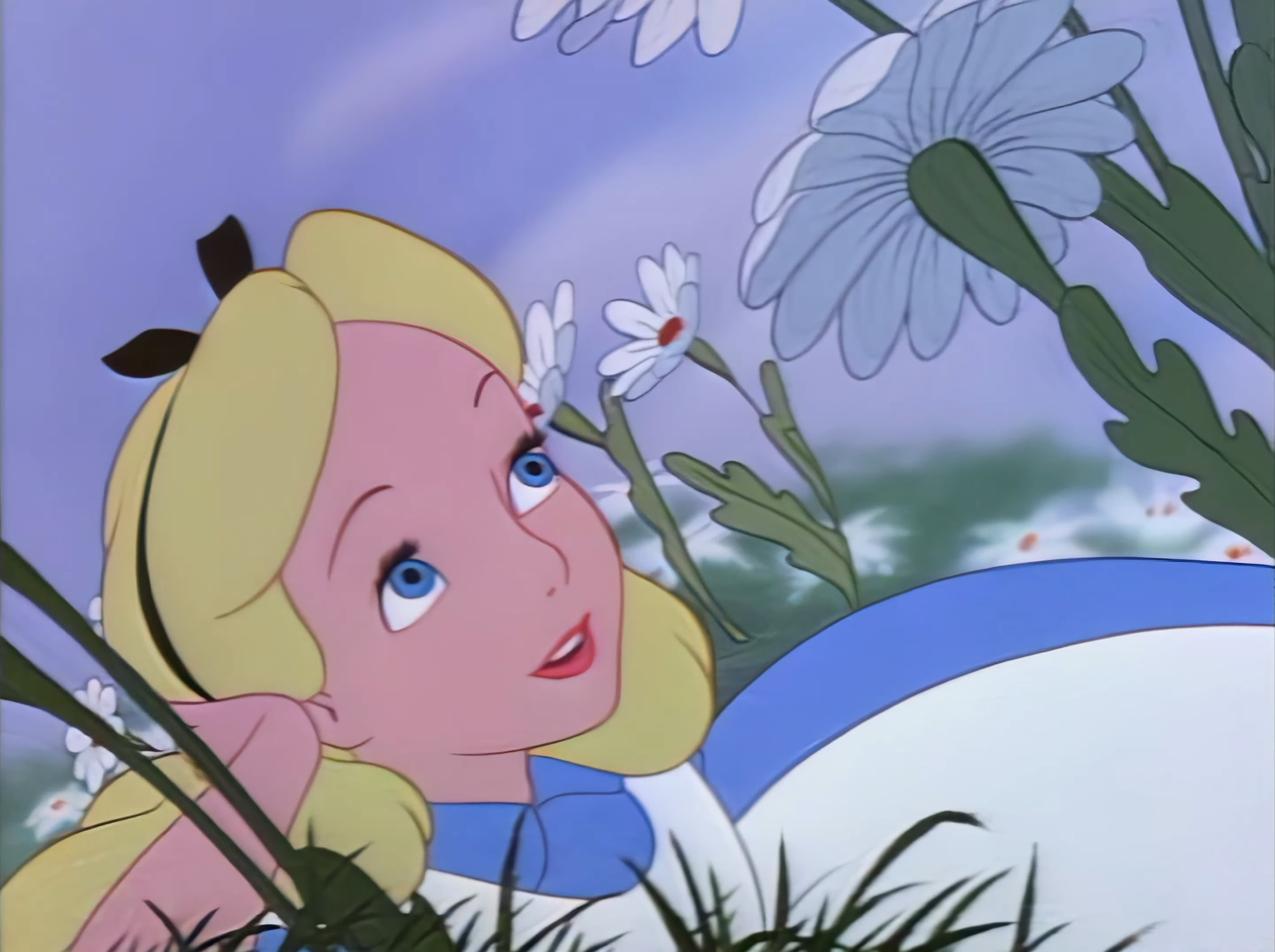
Alice in Wonderland (1951 film), an adaptation of Alice's Adventures in Wonderland

Literary adaptation is the process of adapting a literary work (e.g. a novel, short story, poem) into another genre or medium, such as a film, stage play, video game, or other literary genre, such as a graphic novel, while still maintaining themes of the original story.

Adaptors tend to try to keep the new piece faithful to the original. This is also known as fidelity, and adaptations can range from unfaithful to extremely faithful. Fidelity creates strong opinions among audiences, especially if they are fans of the original work.

Adapted works are important in creating a network, which is known as intertextuality. This is sort of like a spider web, as a story shapes and expands across different mediums. Perhaps most importantly, especially for producers of the screen and stage, an adapted work is more bankable; adaptations represent considerably less risk to investors and pose the possibilities of huge financial gains. This is because:

- It has already attracted a following.
- It works as a literary piece that appeals to a broad group of people.
- Its title, author, characters, etc., may be a franchise in and of themselves.

== History ==
Literary adaptation, the practice of retelling or recreating stories from one medium to another, has a long history, dating back to ancient Greek theater and continuing into modern film and television.

The Oxford English Dictionary, however, notes the first use of adapted in adjective form in 1425: "well suited or fitted to a particular purpose or use; suitable, fitting," while adaptation, in noun form, "the application of something to a particular end or purpose" is not noted until 1597 and then, "the action or process of adapting one thing to fit with another" in 1610.

== Film ==
Works of literature have been adapted for film from the dawn of the industry. Some of the earliest examples come from the work of Georges Méliès, who pioneered many film techniques. In 1899, he released two adaptations—Cinderella based on the Brothers Grimm story of the same name and King John, the first known film to be based on the works of Shakespeare. The 1900 film Sherlock Holmes Baffled, directed by Arthur Marvin featured Arthur Conan Doyle's detective character Sherlock Holmes intruding upon a pseudo-supernatural burglary. The film, considered the first detective movie, ran for only 30 seconds and was originally intended to be shown in hand-cranked Mutoscope machines.

Méliès' 1902 original science-fiction feature A Trip to the Moon was based loosely on two popular novels of the time: Jules Verne's From the Earth to the Moon (1865) and H. G. Wells' The First Men in the Moon (1901). The first of many adaptations of the Brothers Grimm tale Snow White was released in 1902 while the earliest surviving copy is the 1916 version. 1903 saw the release of Alice in Wonderland directed by Cecil Hepworth and Percy Stow, the first movie adaptation of Lewis Carroll's 1865 children's book Alice's Adventures in Wonderland.

The first feature-length film to be shot entirely in Hollywood was Cecil B. DeMille's first assignment, The Squaw Man, in 1914, which was the first of three movie versions (all directed by DeMille) based on Edwin Milton Royle's 1905 play of the same name. Since the early days of the genre, major films have been largely adapted:

- Novels: Gone with the Wind (1939), From Here to Eternity (1953), and The Godfather (1972) were all adapted from novels of the same name.
- Plays: Casablanca (1942), Streetcar Named Desire (1951), and Equus (1977) were all adapted from stage plays.
- Short stories: The Secret Life of Walter Mitty (1947), Breakfast at Tiffany's (1961), The Heart Is a Lonely Hunter (1968), Shawshank Redemption (1994), and Brokeback Mountain (2005) were all made from short stories.

The most celebrated of the early adaptations is Erich von Stroheim's Greed, a 1924 adaptation of the 1899 novel McTeague by naturalist writer Frank Norris. The director intended to film every aspect of the novel in great detail, resulting in a 9½-hour epic feature. At studio insistence, the film was cut down to two hours and was considered a flop upon its theatrical release. It has since been restored to just over four hours and is considered one of the greatest films ever made.

One book that has been adapted frequently (in one form or another) is Charles Dickens' 1843 Christmas story A Christmas Carol, which has around 20 film adaptations to date. Another frequently adapted novel is Mary Shelley's Frankenstein, which has over 60 film adaptations, the most notable film being James Whale's of 1931, which introduced a version of Frankenstein's monster that people most recognize today in terms of his physical appearance.

== Video games ==
Many novels have been adapted into video games. Some video games adapted from novels include: The Witcher, based on the fantasy novels and short stories by Polish author Andrzej Sapkowski; Romance of the Three Kingdoms, based on a Chinese 14th-century historical novel; I Have No Mouth, and I Must Scream, based on a short story by Harlan Ellison; and Hamlet, based on the play by William Shakespeare. The horror video game Parasite Eve is a sequel to a novel by the same name. The Harry Potter series has also been adapted into multiple games, notably Hogwarts Legacy and Lego Harry Potter.

== Other literary genres ==
When considering literary adaptations, mentioning one literary genre to another is important.

== Process ==
Adaptation can be seen as a process and a product. The process involves working to create an adapted work that keeps the original themes of the story without completely changing it. The product is the final piece, and it is important to look at audience and critic reactions as well as its place in the intertextuality of the story. When one adapts, they are putting a story into a new imagination, which is different from how everyone individually imagined the original story (this can cause debate). Audiences often critique film adaptations, saying that the original work is better. This is usually because it is difficult to include all of the plot into a film without the film being extremely long. This difficulty especially comes up if the novel being adapted is lengthy.

Because it is easier to tell a story with a limited number of characters, short stories often make better sources for adaptable material than do novels. For the stage, in addition, theater audiences tend to accept and prefer works of a more conceptual, thought-based nature, meaning their preferences need to be considered when selecting a work for adaptation, but also when determining how best to adapt it. The stage imposes physical limits of size and technology. Not every illusion that can be made to appear real on the movie screen can be made to appear so on stage.

Plagiarism occurs in every genre but such literary rights violations can be challenged in court. In the case of Hollywood films, judgments for the plaintiff can run into the millions of dollars, but these have typically been for outright theft of a screenplay idea rather than for fraudulent adaptations (see Buchwald v. Paramount).

== See also ==
- List of public domain works with multimedia adaptations
