= City Hunters (TV series) =

- Created by: Gastón Gorali & Alberto Stagnaro
- Country of origin: Argentina
- Original language: Spanish
- No. of seasons: 1
- No. of episodes: 9

Production
- Running time: 11 minutes
- Production companies: Fox Factory; Axe Attractions

Original release
- Network: Fox
- Release: October 23 – December 18, 2006

City Hunters is an animated television series developed in Argentina that premiered throughout Latin America in October 2006 on the Fox network. The series, which blends traditional animation techniques with the latest generation of CGI, consists of nine 11-minute episodes.

City Hunters is a form of branded entertainment. It was co-produced by Unilever for the Axe brand.

The animated series follows the antics of an aging Casanova, Dr. Lynch, and the young man he's training in the art of seducing women. The series was created by Catmandu Branded Entertainment, a branded entertainment firm headquartered in Buenos Aires, Argentina and produced by Encuadre. The characters were developed by Italian illustrator Milo Manara and aired in English.

City Hunters airs on Fox Latin America's adult-skewed block "No Molestar" (Spanish-speaking countries; in Brazil, "Não Perturbe", both meaning "Do Not Disturb"), which includes Futurama, The Simpsons, Family Guy, and American Dad!.

The first episode was supervised by Carlos Baeza and most of the episodes were directed by Gustavo Cova and Diego Pernia & Victor Ahmed.

== List of episodes ==
1. "Mahatma Dandy"
2. "Mutiny"
3. "Who's Your Momma"
4. "Wingman"
5. "Simultaneous Matches"
6. "Count Lynch"
7. "Sextopia"
8. "Final Fantasy"
9. "The Phantom Menace"

== Sources ==
- Advertising Age, October 9, 2006, Issue
- article on Variety.com
- Fox article on City Hunters link is 404
