= The Yellow Moon Band =

English rock band

- Origin: London, England
- Years active: 2007–2009
- Label: Static Caravan Recordings
- Members: Jo Bartlett; Danny Hagan; Rudy Carroll; Mathew Priest

The Yellow Moon Band are an English progressive rock band. They released their debut album, Travels into Several Remote Nations of the World on the Static Caravan label in early 2009, to positive reviews. Their music can be described as a mix of psychedelia, folk, and progressive rock.

== Biography ==
In 2007 Jo Bartlett and Danny Hagan of It's Jo and Danny, formed The Yellow Moon Band with guitarist Rudy Carroll and Mathew Priest of Dodgy. The four had been performing as the It's Jo and Danny live band in 2006. TYMB produced a blend of folk and progressive/psychedelic rock.

The band went into Bark Studio in East London to record two singles - "Entangled" and "Maybach" - and the resulting sessions produced most of the material for their debut album Travels Into Several Remote Nations of the World which was released on the Static Caravan label.

The Yellow Moon Band have garnered many favourable reviews for their infrequent gigs, and were invited to headline the inaugural Lewes Psychedelic Festival in March 2009. Their single, "Maybach", was voted Single of the Year by listeners to Radio Weser in Bremen, Germany, in 2008.

The Yellow Moon Band have proved difficult to categorize, DJs and record stores having variously described them as psychedelic, prog rock, Balearic and folk and they have appeared on compilations as varied in genre as Fred Deakin: Nu Balearica and the Amorphous Androgynous' A Monstrous Psychedelic Bubble Exploding in Your Mind: Volume 1.

The song "Chimney" off the debut album is featured as a playable track in the 2011 video game Rocksmith.

Liam Gallagher used their track 'Entangled' to promote his clothing label Pretty Green.

== Discography ==
=== Albums ===
- Travels into Several Remote Nations of the World, 25 January 2009

=== Singles ===
- "Entangled", June 2007
- "Maybach", February 2008
- "Polaris - Time and Space Machine/Xela remixes", May 2009
- "Barehed", August 2010

=== Compilation albums ===
- A Monstrous Psychedelic Bubble Exploding in Your Mind: Volume 1: Cosmic Space Music, January 2009
- Fred Deakin: Nu Balearica, September 2008
