= Milo Manara =

Italian comic creator (1945)

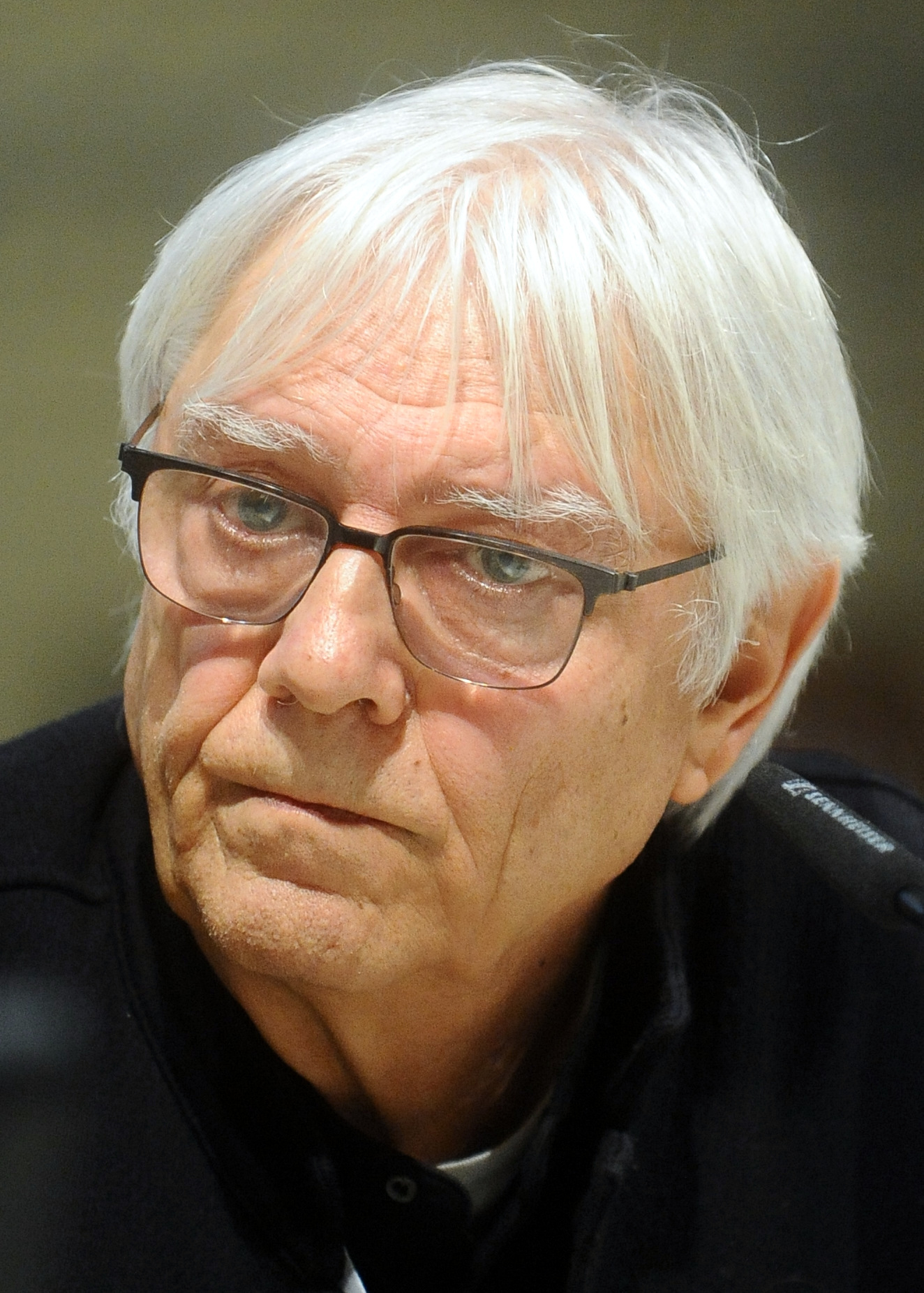
- Milo Manara in 2008
- Born: Maurilio Manara; 12 September 1945 (age 81) Lüsen (Luson), South Tyrol, Kingdom of Italy
- Areas: Artist; writer
- Notable works: The Adventures of Giuseppe Bergman; Butterscotch; Click; Indian Summer
- Awards: Full list

Maurilio Manara (/məˈnɑːrə/; born 12 September 1945), known professionally as Milo Manara, is an Italian comic book writer and artist.

== Career ==
After architecture and painting studies, he made his comics debut in 1969 drawing for Genius, a fumetti neri series of pocket books from publisher Furio Vanio in the wake of the popularity of Kriminal and Satanik. In 1970, he illustrated for the magazine Terror, and starting in 1971 drew the erotic series Jolanda de Almaviva written by Francisco Rubino, issued in small format by publisher Erregi. Joining the youth magazine Il Corriere dei Ragazzi, he worked with Rubino, Carlo Barbieri, Mino Milani and Silverio Pisú. He launched the publications Telerompo and Strategia della Tensione together with Pisú Manara in 1974 along with the series Alessio, Il Borghese Rivoluzionario. Together with writer Mino Milani he launched the series La parola alla giuria in 1975. Manara and Pisú later went on to publish Lo Scimmiotto (The Ape) along the story of the Chinese Monkey King in Alter Linus in 1976, and with Alfredo Castelli, L'Uomo delle Nevi (The Snowman) in 1978.

During this period Manara began publishing work in several Franco-Belgian comics magazines including Charlie Mensuel, Pilote and L'Écho des savanes. For (A SUIVRE) Manara created the first stories featuring HP and Giuseppe Bergman, which grew to become a large body of work. The character "HP" is based on Manara's friend, the Italian comics creator Hugo Pratt, and a collaborator on some of Manara's most acclaimed work, initially Tutto ricominciò con un'estate indiana (1983, Indian Summer) and later El Gaucho (1991). Manara also completed two stories working with another of his heroes, Federico Fellini. In his own right Manara has been commended on his skills as a writer, as with the western L'uomo di carta (1982, The Paper Man).

Erotic illustration typical of Manara's style as it comes to expression in his Click series

Manara's reputation for producing comics that revolve around elegant, beautiful women caught up in unlikely and fantastical erotic scenarios became solidified with work such as Il Gioco (1983, also known as Click or Le Déclic), about a device which renders women helplessly aroused; Il Profumo dell'invisibile (1986, Butterscotch), introducing the heroine Miele (Honey) and a sweet-smelling body-paint which makes the wearer invisible; and Candid camera (1988, Hidden Camera), featuring the same protagonist in further explicit adventures. In the following years of combining sequels, original work, and collaborations with noted creators, Manara's production continued in this direction to explore erotic comics themes with an artistic and storytelling expression in a manner considered unique to Manara.

In the U.S. The Ape was serialised in Heavy Metal in the early 1980s and Manara received some exposure through collaborations with Neil Gaiman and other artists.

=== Later work ===
In connection with their joint project Quarantasei, in July 2006, Manara designed a helmet for Moto GP rider Valentino Rossi, specifically made for the Italian GP in Mugello. Rossi declared:

"He has drawn some kind of a mythical history of my life, in cartoons, with some of my heroes such as Steve McQueen, Enzo Ferrari, Jim Morrison, and other characters such as my dog Guido, the chicken Osvaldo and a lot of beautiful women! I really like Milo...he's a person that I have admired for a long time."

In 2003, Manara's work featured on the cover of Scottish rock band Biffy Clyro's second studio album The Vertigo of Bliss. Manara also created the artwork for all the singles released from this album.

In October 2006, Manara developed character designs for the animated television series City Hunters. The series, consisting of ten 11-minute episodes, blends traditional animation techniques with modern CGI, to be broadcast across all of Latin America on the FOX network throughout 2006 and 2007.

Manara penciled an X-Men project written by Chris Claremont for Marvel Comics called X-Men: Ragazze in fuga that released in April 2009 in Italy, and was later reprinted in short circulation by Marvel Comics in English as X-Women.

He was profiled in the 2011 documentary film Derailments (Deragliamenti).

In 2013 he started to do low print variant covers for issues of Marvel comic books. In 2014, Manara's variant cover for Spider-Woman #1 was widely criticized for putting the character in a pose that was deemed over-sexualized and oddly proportioned by many. Defenders of Manara highlighted that this was a rare collector's variant cover, reflective of his art style for those familiar with him. The piece later sold for over £37,000 at auction in 2020.

== Awards ==
- 1978: Yellow Kid and Gran Guinigi prize for an Italian artist
- 1995: U Giancu's Prize, International Cartoonists Exhibition
- 1998: Harvey Awards: Inducted into the Jack Kirby Hall of Fame
- 2004: Eisner Award, with various artists for Best Anthology, for The Sandman: Endless Nights

== Bibliography ==
Original title	English title	Year	Remarks
Jolanda de Almaviva – La Figlia del Mare		1971	written by Francesco Rubino
La parola alla giuria		1975	written by Mino Milani
Alessio, Il Borghese Rivoluzionario	Alessio	1975	written by Silverio Pisu
Lo scimmiotto	The Ape	1976	written by Silverio Pisu
Un uomo un'avventura: L'uomo delle nevi	The Snowman	1978	written by Alfredo Castelli
HP e Giuseppe Bergman	HP and Giuseppe Bergman	1978	
Le avventure asiatiche di Giuseppe Bergman	The Indian Adventures of Giuseppe Bergman	1980	
L'uomo di carta, o Quattro dita	The Paper Man	1982	
L'ultimo tragico giorno di Gori Bau e Callipigia Sister	The Last Tragic Day of Gori Bau & The Callipygian Sister	1982	originally in Frigidaire #25, translation in Shorts and Manara Erotica Volume One
Tutto ricominciò con un'estate Indiana	Indian Summer	1983	with Hugo Pratt
Il gioco	Click	1983	
Il diario di Sandra F.	The Diaries/Diary of Sandra F.	1985	translation in Heavy Metal #199503 and Manara Erotica Volume Two
Il profumo dell'invisibile	Butterscotch	1986	
Candid camera	Hidden Camera	1988	
L'apparenza inganna		1988	
Viaggio a Tulum	Trip to Tulum	1989	with Federico Fellini
L'arte della sculacciata	The Art of Spanking	1989	written by Jean-Pierre Enard
Le avventure africane di Giuseppe Bergman	An Author in Search of Six Characters and Dies Irae	1990	Published as a serial in Heavy Metal Magazine (1984-1985)
Breakthrough		1990	Written by Neil Gaiman
Il gioco 2	Click 2	1991	
El Gaucho	El Gaucho	1991	with Hugo Pratt
Il sogno di Oengus		1991	written by Giordano Berti
Il viaggio di G. Mastorna detto Fernet	The Voyage of G. Mastorna	1992	with Federico Fellini
La feu aux entrailles		1993	with Pedro Almodóvar
Il gioco vol.3	Click 3	1994	
Seduzioni		1994	
Storie brevi	Shorts	1995	
I viaggi di Gulliver, o Gulliveriana	Gulliveriana or Gullivera	1995	based on text by Jonathan Swift
Kamasutra	Manara's Kama Sutra	1997	based on text by Vatsyayana
Star, Starlettes e Baguettes	Fantasies	1997	In L'Echo des Savanes 1997 & Pin-Up Art English in Heavy Metal #199903
Ballata in si bemolle	Fatal Rendezvous	1997	
Appuntamento fatale	Rendezvous in B-Flat	1997	translation printed in Manara Erotica Volume One
L'asino d'oro	The Golden Ass	1999	based on text by Apuleius
Le avventure metropolitane di Giuseppe Bergman	The Urban Adventures of Giuseppe Bergman	1999	
Bolero		1999	
Tre ragazze nella rete	www.	2000	
Rivoluzione	Revolution	2000	
Il gioco vol.4	Click 4	2001	
Il profumo dell'invisibile 2	Butterscotch 2	2001	
Le donne di Manara	Women of Manara	2001	
Memory		2001	
Fuga da Piranesi	Piranese: The Prison Planet	2002	
Il pittore e la modella	The Model	2002	
Pin-up art		2002	
Aphrodite	Aphrodite, Book 1	2003	written by Pierre Louÿs
Donne e motori		2003	
Fellini		2003	
L'odissea di Bergman	The Odyssey of Giuseppe Bergman	2004	
I Borgia – La conquista del papato	Borgia 1: Blood for the Pope	2004	with Alejandro Jodorowsky
The Sandman: Endless Nights		2004	written by Neil Gaiman; Manara illustrated one chapter, "What I've Tasted of Desire"
I Borgia vol.2 – Il potere e l'incesto	Borgia 2: Power and Incest	2006	with Alejandro Jodorowsky
Quarantasei		2006	with Valentino Rossi
Gli Occhi di Pandora	Pandora's Eyes	2007	written by Vincenzo Cerami
I Borgia vol. 3	Borgia 3: Flames from Hell	2008	with Alejandro Jodorowsky
X-Men: Ragazze in fuga	X-Women	2009	written by Chris Claremont
I Borgia vol. 4 - Tutto è Vanità	Borgia 4: All is Vanity	2010	with Alejandro Jodorowsky
Caravaggio vol. 1 - La Tavolozza e la Spada	Caravaggio 1 - The Palette and the Sword	2015	
Caravaggio vol. 2 - La Grazia	Caravaggio 2 - The Grace	2018	
Il nome della rosa		2023	written by Umberto Eco

== Adaptations ==
- Series
  - Click (1997)
  - City Hunters (2006, animated TV series created by Gastón Gorali & Alberto Stagnaro)
- Films
  - Le Déclic (1985)
  - Le Parfum de l'invisible (1997 IMDb)
  - La Légende de Parva (2003)
  - The Erotic Misadventures of the Invisible Man (2003 IMDb)

== Statue ==
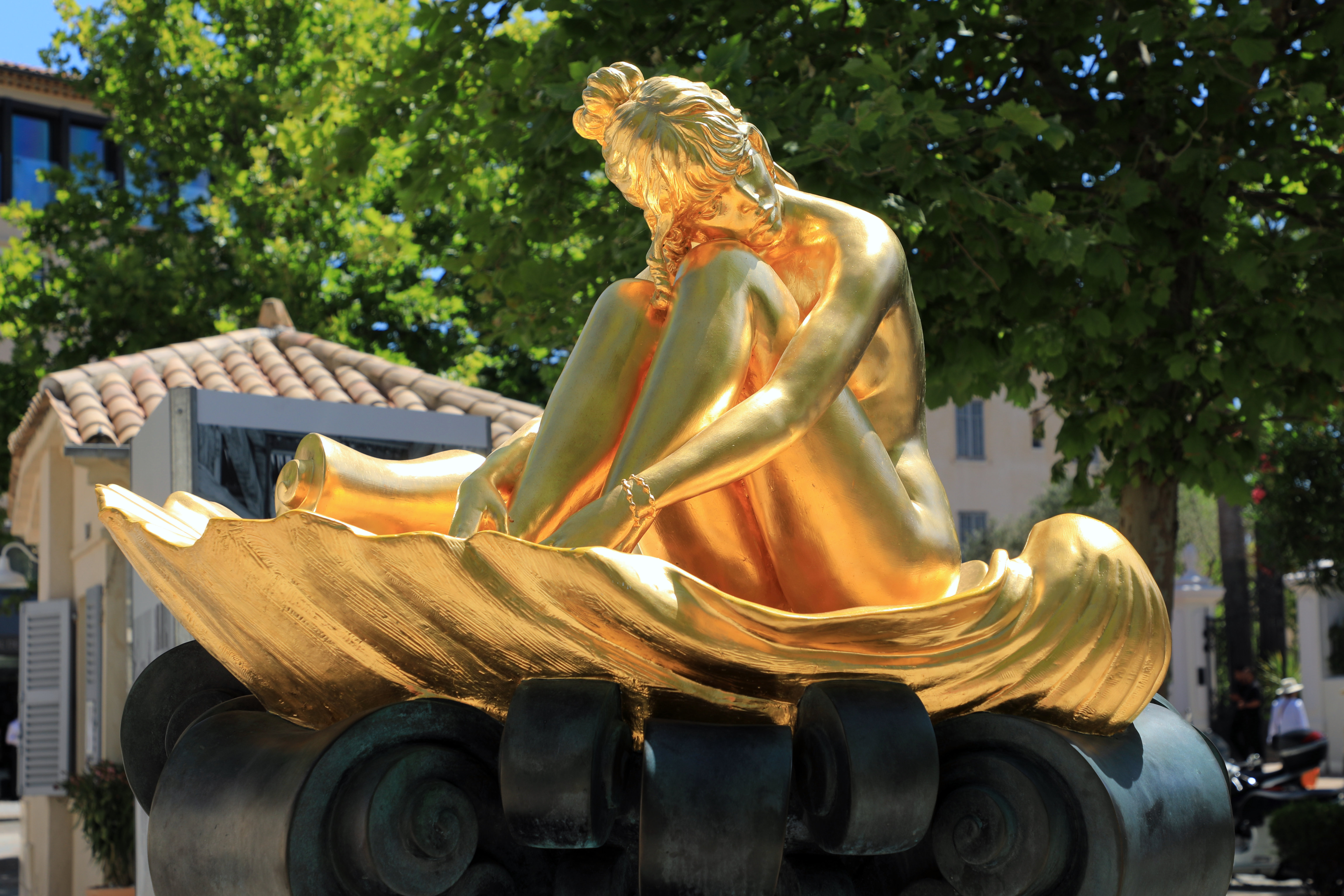
Statue of Brigitte Bardot in Saint-Tropez, based on a watercolor by Milo Manara.

A statue of Brigitte Bardot created by Milo Manara was donated in 2017 to the city of Saint-Tropez by the Millon Foundation. It was inaugurated on 28 September 2017 by Bernard d'Ormale, the actress's husband, and Jean-Pierre Tuveri, mayor of Saint-Tropez.

The project was initiated in 2013 when auctioneer Alexandre Millon, president of the auction house of the same name, invited Milo Manara to devote a series of works to Brigitte Bardot. The artist then produced 27 watercolors intended to be reproduced and marketed as pigment prints :

"I proposed several projects, and it was Brigitte Bardot herself who selected her preferred one", the artist said.

Produced according to the project chosen by the actress by Adolfo Agolini, from the Mariani foundry in Pietrasanta, Italy, in collaboration with Manara, the statue is installed on Place Blanqui in front of the Musée de la Gendarmerie et du Cinéma de Saint-Tropez.

During his career, Manara has depicted numerous figures, including historical characters—most notably the Borgias in a series created with Alejandro Jodorowsky—as well as people from his own circle, such as Federico Fellini and Hugo Pratt. Brigitte Bardot had not allowed an artist to portray her since 1969, when the painter and sculptor Aslan chose her to embody the features of Marianne, the symbolic figure of the French Republic.

== See also ==
- Italian comics

== Sources ==
- Manara publications in (A SUIVRE) Pilote, L'Écho des Savanes and BoDoï – BDoubliées (in French)
- Manara albums – Bedetheque (in French)
- Manara publications in English – Europeancomics.net (in English)
