= Gullivera =

Italian graphic novel

- The cover for Gullivera, art by Milo Manara.
- Date: 1996
- Page count: 72 pages
- Publisher: Les Humanoïdes Associés
- Writer: Milo Manara
- Artist: Milo Manara

Gullivera or Gulliveriana is a stand-alone erotic graphic novel written and illustrated by comic book creator Milo Manara. It was first published in 1996 by French publisher Les Humanoïdes Associés, and has since been translated into several languages. The comic is a parody of Jonathan Swift's Gulliver's Travels.

== Creation and publication ==
Les Humanoïdes Associés first published the work as Gulliveriana in June 1996, in French. The story itself is 64 pages long, with the rest of the various editions taken up by covers, pinups, endplates, credits and other publisher materials. The first English translation was carried out by Jacinthe Leclerc, and published later the same year by NBM Publishing, before being published in the July 1997 issue of Heavy Metal. In 2016, Les Humanoïdes Associés published an oversized English language deluxe version of the book via their Humanoids, Inc. imprint. This edition featured a modified translation by Robert Holland of World Language Communications.

== Synopsis ==
Gullivera is a beautiful student vacationing on a secluded beach; sunbathing, she observes an old sailing ship that has been visible for several days. Gullivera decides to switch to nude sunbathing on a air mattress and drifts out to sea. However, when she tries to swim she tips the mattress, and is forced to swim to the ship naked. The vessel is deserted and seemingly ancient; she finds a tricorne, an old Union Jack and a copy of Jonathan Swift's Gulliver's Travels. Donning the hat and fashioning the flag into a dress, she begins reading only for a sudden storm to appear. The ship is swamped, and she wakes washed up on a strange shore a few hours later.

She wakes to find miniature people attempting to tie her down, and as she rouses they shoot her with arrows. All they do is irritate her, so the strange people change tack and dose her with barrels of wine mixed with a sleeping potion. They then drag the unconscious woman to their nearby kingdom of Lilliput. The King of Lilliput is more amenable, and begs her to function as a triumphal arch for a national holiday. Despite her reservations due to her makeshift dress leaving her crotch exposed, Gullivera agrees and the King's army marches under her spread legs. The parade is interrupted when pirates appear out to sea. Gullivera strips off and swims into the sea, where her giant size causes the raiders to abandon their ships, which she then presents to the King as a new navy. The people of Lilliput make her a new dress in gratitude but her time in favour is short-lived. A fire breaks out at the palace, trapping the Queen; when Gullivera's attempts to blow the flames out only cause them to intensify she urinates on the palace and the Queen, who is furious. Realising she is in danger, Gullivera swims back out to the boat.

Raising the sails, she is blown to another island. On landing, she is attacked by a giant rat and, with some effort, kills the creature with a cutlass. Exhausted, she is found by a giant couple called Grildrig and Glumdalclitch. The lovers dose her with alcohol; Grildrig sexually molests her before a jealous Glumdalclitch puts her in a butterfly cage. The cage is then grabbed by an eagle; Glumdalclitch hits in with an arrow and sends it falling into the sea, allowing Gullivera to swim back to the ship. She then sails to another, different island where everything seems normally sized. However, when drinking from a well a horse approaches Gullivera and engages her in conversation before propositioning her. Gullivera flees back to sea and the boat, only to then find a city floating above her. It is inhabited by a race of normal-sized women who call themselves the Bacchantes, and invite her up. As the men folk of the city are permanently asleep the women have turned to lesbianism, and Gullivera escapes when they start spanking each other with crops.

The ship brings her to another shore and Gullivera is infuriated when a small house convinces her she is still in Lilliput, and attacks the dwelling. However, a girl arrives and tearfully berates her for breaking her Barbie house. Reasoning that if Barbie is there she must be in the real world, the half-naked Gullivera begins the walk home.

== Reception ==
The graphic novel has received largely positive reviews, though most added the caveat of Manara's erotic art not being for everyone. David Brooke of AIPT called it "funny, exciting, and inventive" and recommended the oversized edition for its presentation of Manara's detailed artwork. Dustin Cabeal of Comic Bastards was also effusive, railing against those for whom the artist was "forever remembered for a variant cover and a select group that feels that censoring artwork is okay" (referring to the then-recent controversy generated by Manara's cover for Marvel Comics' 2014 Spider-Woman) recommending it as "a taste of what makes Manara's work memorable and frankly, great" while rating it 4 out of 5. Critical Blast's R.J. Carter noted the book was tame compared to some of Manara's past work.

Due to Gullivera's roots in Gulliver's Travels, the novel has drawn some attention from scholars of Jonathan Swift. In The Reception of Jonathan Swift in Europe, Elinor Shaffer referred to a Portuguese edition of Gullivera as an "erotic extraganza" and expressed relief that more faithful translations existed in Portugal to prevent the story getting a "bad name"., while the Ehrenpreis Center's 2003 edition of the annual Swift Studies journal noted the book "seasons its sexually explicit drawings with the implications of the terms 'gigantic' and 'small, female and helpless'", while also misidentifying Manara as a Czech.
