= Travels into Several Remote Nations of the World (album) =

Studio album by The Yellow Moon Band
- Released: January 2009
- Genre: Progressive rock
- Label: Static Caravan
- Producer: The Yellow Moon Band

Professional ratings
Review scores
Source	Rating
Mojo (magazine)	4/5 stars
MusicOMH	link

Travels into Several Remote Nations of the World is the first album by The Yellow Moon Band, released in 2009. The title of the album was inspired by the sub-title of Jonathan Swift's Gulliver's Travels.

== Track listing ==
1. "Polaris"
2. "Chimney"
3. "Entangled"
4. "Maybach"
5. "Focused"
6. "Domini"
7. "Window"
8. "Lunadelica"

== Notes ==
Writing Credits: The Yellow Moon Band Musicians: Mathew Priest (Drums), Rudy Carroll (Lead Guitar, Mandolin), Danny Hagan (Bass Guitar), Jo Bartlett (Rhythm Guitar), Ali Byworth (Drums) Cover design by Luke Insect. The album was recorded at Bark Studios, North London by Brian O'Shaugnessy.
