= Saban's Gulliver's Travels =

1992 French TV series or program

- Created by: Jonathan Swift
- Written by: Jean Cheville; Alain Garcia
- Directed by: Bruno Bianchi
- Voices of: Terrence Scammell; Daniel Brochu; A.J. Henderson; Sonja Ball; Jessalyn Gilsig
- Theme music composer: Haim Saban; Shuki Levy
- Composers: Haim Saban; Shuki Levy
- Country of origin: France
- Original languages: French; English
- No. of episodes: 26

Production
- Executive producers: Winston Richard; Jacqueline Tordjman; Vincent Chalvon-Demersay
- Producer: Eric S. Rollman
- Running time: 30 minutes
- Production company: Saban International Paris

Original release
- Network: France 2 Canal+
- Release: September 8, 1992 – June 29, 1993

Saban's Gulliver's Travels (French: Les Nouveaux Voyages de Gulliver, also known as simply Gulliver's Travels) is a French animated series that aired from September 8, 1992, to June 29, 1993.

Presented by France 2 and Saban International Paris, with the participation of Canal+ and the C.N.C, the series is a loose adaptation of the 1726 satirical novel Gulliver's Travels by Jonathan Swift, and spanned a total of 26 episodes.

Ownership of the series passed to Disney in 2001 when Disney acquired Fox Kids Worldwide, which also includes Saban Entertainment.

== Plot ==
The series follows the fortunes of sailor Dr. Lemuel Gulliver who decided to explore the whole world. During his travel Gulliver meets a race of small people called the "Lilliputians". Gulliver is accompanied by Dr. Flim, his wife Fosla, her daughter Folia and best friend Raphael. Together experiencing amazing and fantastic adventures.

== Characters ==
- Dr. Lemuel Gulliver (voiced by Terrence Scammell) – The main protagonist of the show. Sailor who decided to explore the whole world.
- Raphael (voiced by Daniel Brochu) – Gulliver's assistant and best friend.
- Dr. Flim (voiced by A.J. Henderson) – A doctor and Fosla's husband.
- Fosla (voiced by Sonja Ball) – Dr. Flim's wife.
- Folia (voiced by Jessalyn Gilsig) – A daughter of Fosla and Dr. Flim.

== Episodes ==
No.	Title	Original release date
1	"Battle of the Giants (Part 1)"	September 8, 1992
2	"Battle of the Giants (Part 2)"	September 15, 1992
3	"Snake Dance"	September 22, 1992
Gulliver and the group arrives to an island and met by Prince Coral who informed them they are on the Island of Hood and the people have magical powers, they have never heard the name of the island but Coral says it is not on any map and they have only had few vistors coming to them. They are invited to a ball in their honor, but in truth Coral and the people are snake people and visitors are devoured, Gulliver and the group must escape before they become the snakes dinner.
4	"King Raphael"	September 29, 1992
5	"The Architect of the King"	October 6, 1992
6	"Pigeons for Raphael"	October 13, 1992
7	"The Healer"	October 20, 1992
Everyone in Lilliput has become sick for some reason and Minister Bolgolam have brought Dr. Quack to help, but this is due to a potion Dr. Quack created and part of the plan to have Gulliver and Raphael unknowningly drink it so Dr. Quack can operate on them and put them under Bolgolam's control so he can rule over Lilliput. It is up to Flim, Fosla and Folia to save Gulliver and Raphael.
8	"Bread, Butter and Cheese"	October 27, 1992
9	"The Hunt Game"	November 3, 1992
10	"War"	November 10, 1992
11	"The Island of the Houyhoyhums"	November 17, 1992
12	"The Island of the Philosophs"	November 24, 1992
13	"Haute Couture"	December 1, 1992
14	"The Monkey King"	March 30, 1993
15	"Film Superstar"	April 13, 1993
16	"The Pirates"	April 20, 1993
17	"Abracadabra"	April 27, 1993
18	"The Sweet Interess"	May 4, 1993
19	"The Island of Laputa"	May 11, 1993
20	"The Sunken City"	May 18, 1993
21	"The Great Parade"	May 25, 1993
22	"The Small Giant"	June 1, 1993
23	"Too Difeacull to Throw"	June 8, 1993
24	"The Amazon Queen"	June 15, 1993
25	"The Gold City"	June 22, 1993
26	"The Volcano Lava"	June 29, 1993
