= List of Muppet Babies (2018 TV series) episodes =

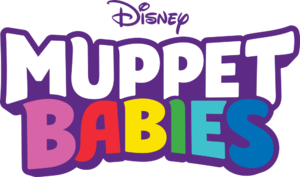

Muppet Babies is an American animated television series produced by The Muppets Studio and Oddbot Animation that began airing on Disney Junior and Disney Channel on March 23, 2018. It is a reboot of the original 1984 animated series of the same name, that was originally produced by Jim Henson Productions and Marvel Productions.

== Series overview ==
Season	Episodes	Originally released	
Season	Episodes	First released	Last released
Shorts	22	March 2, 2018	July 1, 2019
1	20	March 23, 2018	May 3, 2019
Special		August 3, 2018	
2	21	August 9, 2019	August 21, 2020
3	30	January 4, 2021	February 18, 2022

== Episodes ==
=== Season 1 (2018–19) ===
No. overall	No. in series	Title	Directed by	Written by	Storyboard by	Original release date	Prod. code	US viewers (millions)
1a	1a	"Sir Kermit the Brave"	Guy Moore	Robyn Brown	Eric McConnell	March 23, 2018	101	0.89
While suffering from a secret fear of the dark, Kermit imagines himself as a knight where he has an encounter with a dragon named Dot (Rachel Bloom). Song: "What's So Scary About the Dark?" by Kermit and Dot
1b	1b	"Animal Fly Airplane"	Guy Moore	Eric Shaw	Sebastian Montes	March 23, 2018	101	0.89
Animal expresses interest in wanting to fly an airplane after the rest of the Muppet Babies imagine themselves flying to Paris, France, but they will not let him due to his wild personality.
2a	2a	"Hatastrophe"	Guy Moore	Laura Sreebny	Shawna Cha	March 23, 2018	102	0.89
While playing with Fozzie's propeller beanie, Kermit accidentally causes it to fall into the yard of their neighbors Mr. Statler and Mr. Waldorf, and must lead the others into finding a way to return it to Fozzie.
2b	2b	"Fly South"	Guy Moore	Robyn Brown	Hank Tucker	March 23, 2018	102	0.89
After learning about how birds migrate south for the winter, Gonzo worries that Camilla, Priscilla, and Beep are going to migrate when Miss Nanny plans to take them on a trip. Song: "Never Have to Say Goodbye (To the Summer)" by Gonzo and the cast
3a	3a	"The Great Muppet Sport-A-Thon"	Guy Moore	Michael Goldberg	Stan Ruiz	March 30, 2018	103	0.87
The Muppet Babies put on a sporting competition, but Piggy gets upset when she loses several events. With help from Miss Nanny, Piggy learns how to be a good sport and get back in the game. Song: "Get Back in the Game" by Miss Nanny
3b	3b	"You Say Potato, I Say Best Friend"	Guy Moore	Laura Sreebny	Scott Jeralds	March 30, 2018	103	0.87
When Gonzo becomes best friends with a potato, the rest of the Muppet Babies must learn how to include it in their games. Song: "Me and My Potato" by Gonzo
4a	4a	"Super Fabulous vs. Captain Icecube"	Guy Moore	Robyn Brown	Kiara Zhao	April 6, 2018	104	0.86
To make Piggy and Summer play together as the superheroes Super Fabulous and Captain Icecube, Kermit pretends to be kidnapped by Gonzo, Fozzie, and Animal as the supervillains Dr. Meanzo, Noodler, and Meanimal. Song: "Super Fabulous" by Piggy as Super Fabulous
4b	4b	"Piggy's Time Machine"	Guy Moore	Eric Shaw	Sandra Frame	April 6, 2018	104	0.86
The Muppet Babies use an imaginary time machine to help an impatient Piggy celebrate her birthday sooner, but she accidentally breaks it and strands them in ancient Egypt. Song: "Good Things Come to Those Who Wait" by Kermit, Gonzo, and Fozzie
5a	5a	"How Kermit Got His Groove"	Guy Moore	Laura Sreebny	Kiara Zhao	April 13, 2018	105	0.85
As the Muppet Babies clean up the playroom before music time, Rizzo the Rat moves out of the nearby mouse hole and starts making a mess of things. If the Muppet Babies want to reclaim the playroom, they will have to beat Rizzo in a dance contest, with Kermit as his opponent. When Kermit admits to not knowing how to dance, the other Muppet Babies work to teach him before the dance-off. Song: "You Can Be a Dancer!" by the cast
5b	5b	"One Small Problem"	Guy Moore	Robyn Brown	Eric McConnell	April 13, 2018	105	0.85
Summer is tired of being the shortest among her friends, so Bunsen Honeydew and Beaker invent an Enlarge-O Ray to increase her size. However, it malfunctions and shrinks Summer to a smaller size. While Bunsen and Beaker work to fix the Enlarge-O Ray, the other Muppet Babies must find a way to have fun with a tiny-sized Summer.
6a	6a	"Playground Pirates"	Guy Moore	Laura Sreebny	Scott Jeralds	April 20, 2018	106	0.78
When Miss Nanny's earring goes missing, Kermit imagines himself as the pirate, Captain Greenbeard, and leads Piggy, Fozzie, Gonzo, Animal, Summer, and Camilla into searching for it while overcoming obstacles like a storm, a giant squid, and some booby traps. Song:"Muppet Pirate Shanty" by the cast
6b	6b	"The Blanket Fort"	Guy Moore	Niki Lytton	Stan Ruiz	April 20, 2018	106	0.78
Piggy and Summer build a blanket fort which leads to Blanketopia, where the former is a queen and the latter is a princess. However, Piggy enforces strict rules and sends the others to the dungeon when they try to have fun. Song: "The Rules of the Kingdom" by Piggy
7a	7a	"Summer Penguin P.I."	Guy Moore	Robyn Brown	Shawna Cha	April 27, 2018	107	0.85
When Piggy and Gonzo's checker board gets flipped, Summer becomes a Sherlock Holmes style-detective to find out who is responsible. Song: "I'm on the Case" by Summer
7b	7b	"You Ought to Be in Pictures"	Guy Moore	Robyn Brown	Gloria Jenkins	April 27, 2018	107	0.85
During a field trip at the museum, a monkey from a painting steals Fozzie's lunchbox, so the Muppet Babies work to reclaim it before lunchtime.
8a	8a	"Kermit Levels Up"	Guy Moore	Robyn Brown	Bill Breneisen	May 4, 2018	108	0.78
As Fozzie gets ready for his comedy show, Kermit starts playing a video game that Mr. Statler accidentally dropped into their yard. The Muppet Babies imagine themselves in the game as Fozzie becomes concerned that they are becoming more focused on the video game to the exclusion of all else.
8b	8b	"Frogs of a Feather"	Guy Moore	Laura Sreebny	Scott Jeralds	May 4, 2018	108	0.78
A blue frog named Carlos (Todrick Hall) arrives at Miss Nanny's house. Believing he is just like Kermit, Fozzie imagines him in a frog-themed hotel and gives him things that Kermit likes; neglecting to ask Carlos what he likes. Songs: "The Lily Pad Blues" and "What This Frog Likes" both by Carlos
9a	9a	"Animal Cleans Up"	Guy Moore	Glen Berger	Kiara Zhao	June 8, 2018	109	0.57
Animal starts to stink after doing a lot of smelly activities, but he refuses to take a bath. To remedy this, the rest of the Muppet Babies imagine themselves in a car wash and work together to get a vehicle version of Animal in it. Songs: "Car Wash" and "Dirty Zone" by Animal
9b	9b	"Best Pals Pizza Parlor Palace"	Guy Moore	Travis Braun	Stan Ruiz	June 8, 2018	109	0.57
Kermit and Fozzie disagree on how to run their imaginary pizza parlor, with the former wanting it to be the fancy "Best Pals Pizza Palace" and the latter the family friendly "Best Pals Pizza Parlor". When Rizzo the food critic shows up, they will have to come to an agreement on what pizza to make for him.
10a	10a	"The Good, the Bad, and the Froggy"	Guy Moore and Eric Shaw (Live Action "Dr. Teeth" Segment)	Dan Danko	Shawna Cha and Bill Breneisen	June 15, 2018	110	0.50
After Kermit hurts his knee in a tricycle race, he no longer wants to ride a tricycle, so the Muppet Babies go on a Wild West adventure after Galloping Gulch has its juiceboxes stolen by Gonzo the Kid and Sundance the Potato and Sheriff Kermit must ride the tricycle again to foil Gonzo the Kid. Song: "Summer's Square Dance" by Summer "Hopalong Froggy and the Buckin' Bronco" by Kermit
10b	10b	"Muppet Rock"	Guy Moore and Eric Shaw (Live Action "Dr. Teeth" Segment)	Robyn Brown	Gloria Jenkins	June 15, 2018	110	0.50
The Muppet Babies form a rock band in order to perform at Muppet Rock-Splosion, but they will have to get ready to perform by nightfall. While Animal says they need to practice, Piggy thinks that they should have other stuff for their performance instead. Songs: "Do You Wanna Rock?" and "You Can Be a Star" by Piggy
11a	11a	"Upside Down Day"	Guy Moore	S : Chelsea Beyl; T : Dan Danko	Jina Noh and Bill Breneisen	June 29, 2018	111	0.58
When Summer isn't in a good mood as usual. Doctor Gonzo, who says she has a case of bad-day-itis, recommends turning the whole playroom upside down to cure it. Songs: "Upside-Downsy Conga" and "You're Not Alone" by Kermit
11b	11b	"Tooth and Consequences"	Guy Moore	Peter Hirsch	Scott Jeralds and Bill Breneisen	June 29, 2018	111	0.58
Animal gets disappointed when he loses a tooth and the Tooth Fairy fails to come, so he and his friends travel to the Tooth Fairy's lair to find out more. Song: "Fozzie's Tooth Fairy Song" by Fozzie
12a	12a	"The Great Gonzo's Desert Grand Prix"	Guy Moore	Travis Braun	Gloria Jenkins	July 20, 2018	112	0.54
Gonzo decides to make everything a race and challenges the whole playroom to a Grand Prix, wherein he cheats to ensure he wins.
12b	12b	"Animal Kong"	Guy Moore	Robyn Brown	Cynthia Petrovic and Bill Breneisen	July 20, 2018	112	0.54
During quiet time, Animal starts to throw a tantrum when he is forbidden from playing the drums, becoming Animal Kong. With help from Rizzo, the Muppet Babies must find a way to calm him down. Song: "I've Been There Buddy" by Summer
13a	13a	"Bunsen Knows All"	Guy Moore	Steve Sullivan	Shawna Cha and Bill Breneisen	August 17, 2018	113	0.64
Bunsen is asked a question he does not know the answer to, so he fibs; unknowingly causing undue chaos. Song: "How to Grow a Rubber Chicken Tree" by Bunsen
13b	13b	"Doctor Fozzie"	Guy Moore	Robyn Brown	Kiara Zhao	August 17, 2018	113	0.64
While playing hospital, Doctor Fozzie quickly gets too many patients. Song: "Laughter is the Best-est Medicine" by Fozzie
14a	14a	"Grandpa Camp"	Guy Moore	S : Steve Sullivan; T : Matt Danner	Stan Ruiz	September 14, 2018	114	N/A
On National Grandparent's Day, Kermit learns Fozzie has never met his grandparents because they live too far away from where Fozzie lives, so he asks Mr. Statler and Mr. Waldorf to be Fozzie's substitute grandparents. Song: "I Don't Know But I've Been Told"
14b	14b	"A Backyard Divided"	Guy Moore	Cindy Begel	Cynthia Petrovic	September 14, 2018	114	N/A
When Gonzo and Piggy have an argument over getting in each other's way, they divide the backyard into two separate kingdoms, with Animal and Summer on Gonzo's side and Kermit and Fozzie on Piggy's side.
15a	15a	"Happy Hallowocka"	Guy Moore	Michael Goldberg	Stan Ruiz	October 5, 2018	115	0.59
On Halloween, Fozzie tries to be scary, only to do funny things. Wanting to help, Animal becomes a ghost to scare the other Muppet Babies. Song: "Super Spooky Halloween" by Fozzie
15b	15b	"The Teeth Chattering Tale of the Haunted Pancakes"	Guy Moore	Robyn Brown	Cynthia Petrovic and Bill Breneisen	October 5, 2018	115	0.59
When Kermit refuses to try Miss Nanny's Halloween "boo-berry" pancakes, Summer tells him the story of Halloween Hollow resident Kermibod, who causes the Witch of Trying New Things to appear and bring the pancakes to life to make him try them. Song: "Try Something New" by Summer
16a	16a	"Kermit's Big Show"	Guy Moore	Dan Danko	Gloria Jenkins	November 9, 2018	116	0.59
The Muppet Babies plan to put on a show of "The Three Little Pigs" for Miss Nanny, but Director Kermit wants to stick to the story and not include the others' creative ideas. Song: "Improvise" by Miss Nanny and Kermit
16b	16b	"The Card Shark"	Guy Moore	Dan Danko	Scott Jeralds	November 9, 2018	116	0.59
Piggy has to learn how to win at playing a board game without cheating after Rizzo beats her at her own game.
17a	17a	"A Very Muppet Babies Christmas"	Guy Moore	Robyn Brown	Kiara Zhao	November 30, 2018	117	0.52
On Christmas, everyone receives their secret Santa gifts, but Kermit is the only one who does not like his. Song: "A Very Muppet Babies Christmas" by Kermit
17b	17b	"Summer's Super Fabulous Holiday Surprise"	Guy Moore	Eric Shaw	Kiara Zhao	November 30, 2018	117	0.52
When a snowstorm cancels Summer's trip home, Piggy brings her friend's traditions to the playroom, but accidentally incorporates some of her own instead. Song: "Family" by Kermit, Piggy, Fozzie, Gonzo, Animal and Summer
18a	18a	"Summer the Great"	Guy Moore	Robyn Brown	Scott Jeralds and Bill Breneisen	January 4, 2019	118	0.67
After being inspired by Gonzo to do amazing stunts, Summer takes on daring feats of her own, but learns something about herself in the process. Song: "There Are Lots of Ways to Be Great" by Gonzo
18b	18b	"Planet Gonzo"	Guy Moore	Eric Shaw	Kiara Zhao and Bill Breneisen	January 4, 2019	118	0.67
When Gonzo feels he is too different from everyone else, the Muppet Babies rocket to Planet Gonzo, where everyone is just like him. Song: "Just Like Me" by Gonzo and Gonzo-like Aliens
19a	19a	"The Best, Best Friend"	Guy Moore	Niki Lytton	Kiara Zhao and Bill Breneisen	March 15, 2019	119	0.51
Fozzie fears he might be losing his best friend, Kermit, when Rowlf shows up in the playroom and wins everyone over. Song: "Frogs and Dogs" by Rowlf
19b	19b	"Counting Kermits"	Guy Moore	Dan Danko	Shawna Cha	March 15, 2019	119	0.51
Bunsen creates multiple clones of Kermit so he can play with all of his friends at the same time, but problems arise when he makes too many clones. Song: "Too Much Me" by Kermit and the Kermit clones
20a	20a	"Puppy for a Day"	Guy Moore	Dan Danko	Stan Ruiz	May 3, 2019	120	0.45
The Muppet Babies try to convince Miss Nanny that they are ready for a puppy after training with Rizzo. Song: "Puppy Come Home"
20b	20b	"No Laughing Matter"	Guy Moore	Melanie Wilson LaBracio & Adam Wilson	Cynthia Petrovic	May 3, 2019	120	0.45
After losing his Great Uncle Schnozzie's joke book, Fozzie becomes convinced he is unable to be funny without it. Song: "To Get You Laughing" by Fozzie

=== Special (2018) ===
Title	Directed by	Written by	Storyboard by	Original release date	Prod. code	US viewers (millions)
"Muppet Babies: Show and Tell Special"	Guy Moore	Robyn Brown, Amy Keating Rogers, Eric Shaw, and Laura Sreebny	Shawna Cha, Gloria Jenkins, Stan Ruiz, James Suhr, Hank Tucker, and Kiara Zhao	August 3, 2018	VS101	0.56
The Muppet Babies show Miss Nanny what they did for Show and Tell.

=== Season 2 (2019–20) ===
NOTE: This is the first season where the title cards are discontinued, despite the titles still being heard in the beginning of every episode.

No. overall	No. in series	Title	Directed by	Written by	Storyboard by	Original release date	Prod. code	US viewers (millions)
21a	1a	"The Froginizer"	Guy Moore	Kevin Hopps	Bill Breneisen	August 9, 2019	201	0.47
While the Muppet Babies play superheroes, Piggy (Super Fabulous) and Summer (Captain Ice Cube) help Kermit discover his superpower. Song: "Meanzo Fabulous" by Gonzo, Fozzie and Animal
21b	1b	"My Fair Animal"	Guy Moore	Dan Danko	Cynthia Petrovic	August 9, 2019	201	0.47
Piggy tries to make Animal fancy in time for her upcoming tea party. Song: "My Fair Animal" by Piggy and Animal
22a	2a	"Starship Piggy"	Guy Moore	Max Beaudry	Kelsey Norden	August 16, 2019	202	0.42
Piggy takes credit for the spaceship Kermit made and pretends to take the Muppet Babies to outer space. Song: "Starship Piggy" by Piggy, Fozzie, Gonzo, Summer and Animal.
22b	2b	"My Buddy"	Guy Moore	Adam Wilson & Melanie Wilson LaBracio	Kiara Zhao	August 16, 2019	202	0.42
Animal lets Fozzie borrow his stuffed bunny Buddy. However, Fozzie gets attached to Buddy so much to the point where he refuses to return it. Song: "My Buddy and Me" by Fozzie
23a	3a	"Finders Keepers"	Guy Moore	Ghia Godfree	Pez Hofmann	August 23, 2019	203	0.52
When Rizzo finds emeralds in the sandbox, he must resist pocketing the treasure while helping the Muppet Babies return them; contending with booby traps and mummies Statler and Waldorf along the way as well.
23b	3b	"Monster Next Door"	Guy Moore	Adam Wilson & Melanie Wilson LaBracio	Jojo Baptista	August 23, 2019	203	0.52
After Potato accidentally ends up in the backyard of Sweetums that moved in next door, it is up to the Muppet Babies to rescue him. Song: "Must Be a Monster" by Kermit, Piggy, Fozzie, Gonzo, Summer, and Animal
24a	4a	"The Great Muppet Cook-Off"	Guy Moore	Adam Wilson & Melanie Wilson LaBracio	Cynthia Petrovic and Stan Ruiz	September 27, 2019	204	0.43
When the Muppet Babies like Chef's homemade cookies more than Piggy's cookies, she challenges him to a cook-off. Song: "Steppity Steppity" by Chef
24b	4b	"Animal and the Egg"	Guy Moore	Claudia Silver	Kim Le and Bill Breneisen	September 27, 2019	204	0.43
Animal learns to be gentle when he catches a bird egg that fell from its nest. Song: "Slow Down" by Summer
25a	5a	"Tagalong Polliwog"	Guy Moore	Francisco Paredes	Kiara Zhao	October 25, 2019	205	N/A
Kermit's nephew Robin comes to visit and everyone is excited to play with him, but Kermit is very protective and asks him to sit out; fearing he is too small to keep up. After Kermit loses his golf ball to a giant clam however, Robin is able to prove himself useful.
25b	5b	"Sparkly Star Switcheroo"	Guy Moore	Dustin Ferrer	Kelsey Norden and Stan Ruiz	October 25, 2019	205	N/A
When Rowlf becomes sad about not making a wish on a shooting star, Summer paints a sparkly star picture to cheer him up. After finishing it however, Piggy thinks that she made it for her and takes it. To avoid hurting her feelings, Summer leads the others in a heist film-style adventure to switch the pictures without Piggy seeing them. Song: "Penguin with a Plan" by Summer
26a	6a	"Mystery on the Muppet Express"	Guy Moore	Ghia Godfree	Jojo Baptista and Stan Ruiz	November 15, 2019	206	N/A
When Buddy the Bunny goes missing while the Muppet Babies are having fun on their train; The Muppet Express, Summer Penguin becomes a detective again to help Animal find his favorite toy. Song: "The Muppet Express" by Gonzo, Kermit, Piggy, Fozzie, Summer, and Animal
26b	6b	"Mister Manny"	Guy Moore	Ghia Godfree	Pez Hofmann, Bill Breneisen, and Stan Ruiz	November 15, 2019	206	N/A
When Mr. Manny (Dulé Hill) steps in for Miss Nanny, Piggy must learn to accept his babysitting style. Song: "Open Your Mind Up (To Something New)" by Mr. Manny
27a	7a	"The Karate Club"	Guy Moore	Max Beaudry	Bill Breneisen	December 6, 2019	207	N/A
Fozzie must learn the ancient feathered art of "Camilla-rate" in order to join Camilla's martial arts team, The Kickin' Chickens. Song: "Kick It Up A Notch" by Jess Harnell
27b	7b	"Don't Over Duet"	Guy Moore	Max Beaudry	Cynthia Petrovic	December 6, 2019	207	N/A
Piggy practices her performance for Miss Nanny's birthday song too hard and loses her voice. Song: "Happy Birthday Miss Nanny" by Piggy and Rowlf
28a	8a	"Run Fozzie Run"	Guy Moore	Max Beaudry and Ghia Godfree	Kiara Zhao and Stan Ruiz	December 13, 2019	208	N/A
Miss Nanny makes Fozzie her helper while tidying up the playroom. When he accidentally breaks a flower pot and fears that Miss Nanny will react negatively, he runs away and imagines fleeing into a story book about a baby gorilla. Now the other Muppet Babies must work to find Fozzie after he keeps breaking things. Song: "Getting Away From It All" by Fozzie
28b	8b	"My Brother Vinny"	Guy Moore	Ghia Godfree	Kelsey Norden	December 13, 2019	208	N/A
When Rizzo's superstar brother, Vinny Linguini (John DeLuca), comes to town, he claims to be a superstar himself and enlists the other Muppet Babies into helping him prepare for a big show. Song: "I Gotta Be Me" by Vinny Linguini and Rizzo (Gonzo)
29a	9a	"Beaker 2.0"	Guy Moore	Adam Wilson & Melanie Wilson LaBracio	Jojo Baptista and Stan Ruiz	January 3, 2020	209	0.60
Bunsen creates a robotic substitute lab assistant, Beaker 2.0, to fill in while Beaker is away. Song: "A Beautiful Friendship" by Bunsen and Beaker 2.0
29b	9b	"When You Wish Upon a Rizzo"	Guy Moore	Laura Sreebny	Pez Hofmann	January 3, 2020	209	0.60
The Muppet Babies are visited by Rizzo the Genie and wish for various things. Song: "Genie in a Lamp" by Rizzo (as a Genie)
30a	10a	"Chicken Round-Up"	Guy Moore	Kevin Hopps	Bill Breneisen	January 31, 2020	210	0.30
Animal learns to keep his promises when he forgets to put the chicks back in the coop.
30b	10b	"Summer's Snow Cone Stop"	Guy Moore	Francisco Paredes	Cynthia Petrovic	January 31, 2020	210	0.30
Summer makes a snow-cone shop, but everyone (except Rowlf) wants to change it. Note: This episode and Chicken Round-Up are dedicated to Skye Wiene, who died in a collision before the episodes aired.
31a	11a	"Wocka by Fozzie"	Guy Moore	Ghia Godfree	Kiara Zhao	February 28, 2020	211	0.37
Fozzie cannot wait for the very first Muppet Babies sleepover, but after all the fun slumber party antics, he has second thoughts. Song: "You'll Get There Soon" by Miss Nanny
31b	11b	"Gonzo's Clean Sweep"	Guy Moore	Adam Wilson & Melanie Wilson LaBracio	Kelsey Norden	February 28, 2020	211	0.37
The Muppet Babies must finish their chores, but Gonzo has other ideas.
32a	12a	"Meatball Mayhem"	Guy Moore	Dan Danko	Pez Hofmann	March 6, 2020	212	0.36
After trying and not liking Chef's meatballs, the Muppet Babies pretend to like them so as not to hurt his feelings before going to great lengths to secretly get rid of them. They try to feed them to Sweetums, Rizzo, and Mr. Statler and Mr. Waldorf who make their own opinions about them. When it came to Bunsen, he tries to use his latest invention to flavor it up only for the invention to accidentally turn the meatballs into one meatball monster.
32b	12b	"Bunsen Honeydew, Show Stopper"	Guy Moore	Ghia Godfree	Stan Ruiz	March 6, 2020	212	0.36
The Muppets are planning a Muppet Rocksplosion concert when Piggy discovers Beaker can hit a crucial musical note and adds him to the band. Not wanting to lose his friend, Bunsen tries to ruin the show so Beaker will keep playing with him instead. Song: "Muppet Rocksplosion"
33a	13a	"Best Friends Fixer Uppers"	Guy Moore	Max Beaudry	Cynthia Petrovic and Kelsey Norden	April 17, 2020	213	0.40
Kermit and Fozzie get distracted and fail to finish their fix-it projects. Song: "We Can Fix It" by Kermit and Fozzie
33b	13b	"Gonzo's Coop Dreams"	Guy Moore	Max Beaudry	Bill Breneisen	April 17, 2020	213	0.40
Disaster strikes when Gonzo wears a pair of "Can't Lose Shoes" to help the chicks win a basketball game.
34a	14a	"Win a Twin"	Guy Moore	Max Beaudry	Pez Hofmann and Bill Breneisen	May 22, 2020	214	0.34
The Muppet Babies find Scooter a replacement twin even though he thinks he is unable to have fun without his sister, Skeeter. Song: "Two of a Kind" by Scooter and Skeeter
34b	14b	"Skeeter and the Super Girls"	Guy Moore	Francisco Paredes	Stan Ruiz	May 22, 2020	214	0.34
Skeeter tries to fight crime as super-speedster, Top Speed, without her glasses.
35a	15a	"Animal Gets the Sneezies"	Guy Moore	Max Beaudry	Kelsey Norden	June 5, 2020	215	0.41
Despite getting a case of the sneezies, Animal refuses to go to the doctor. Song: "You'll Get Better" by Miss Nanny and the Muppet Babies (sans Animal)
35b	15b	"Library Leapfrog"	Guy Moore	Max Beaudry	Kiara Zhao	June 5, 2020	215	0.41
In preparation for their library trip, Piggy and Summer show Robin all the wonderful places books can take you. Song: "Let's Get on the Bus" by the Muppet Babies (with Robin)
36a	16a	"The Spoon in the Stone"	Guy Moore	Ghia Godfree	Bill Breneisen	June 19, 2020	216	0.40
When Rizzo tells a story about the Spoon in the Stone, Animal, Gonzo, and Piggy race off on a quest to become the greatest knight. Song: Kermit the Barde narrates the story in song to a repeating tune. In the end, the other characters chime in.
36b	16b	"Gonzonocchio"	Guy Moore	Max Beaudry & Francisco Paredes	Cynthia Petrovic	June 19, 2020	216	0.40
When Gonzo loses his library book, he tells tall tales to cover the truth. Song: "Let's Get on the Bus" by the Muppet Babies
37a	17a	"Summer's Big Kerfloofle"	Guy Moore	Max Beaudry	Kiara Zhao and Bill Breneisen	June 26, 2020	217	0.32
When Bunsen and Beaker bring a Floofle to the playroom, it bonds with Summer. Songs: "Follow Me Little Floofle" (repeated later as "Follow the Leader") by Summer
37b	17b	"Frog Scouts"	Guy Moore	Mia Resella	Kelsey Norden	June 26, 2020	217	0.32
Kermit, Robin, and Carlos are excited for their very first Frog Scouts outing, led by Mr. Manny. Song: "(So You Wanna) Be a Frog" by Carlos
38a	18a	"Animal and the Magic Mummy"	Guy Moore	Francisco Paredes	Pez Hofmann and Bill Breneisen	July 10, 2020	218	0.27
Animal releases a mummy in a museum who makes a big mess. Song: "Let's Get on the Bus" by the Muppet Babies and "Even Mummies Gotta Be Careful What They Touch" by the Magic Mummy and the Muppet Rocksplosion.
38b	18b	"The Friends of Zorna Club"	Guy Moore	Max Beaudry	Stan Ruiz	July 10, 2020	218	0.27
After everyone fails Gonzo's tests to get into his new club, the kids have their own dance party.
39a	19a	"Secret Agent Double-Oh-Frog"	Guy Moore	Hanah Lee Cook	Bill Breneisen	July 24, 2020	219	0.22
Kermit gets recruited as Secret Agent Double-Oh-Frog so he can get back his toy banjo from Dr. Nose and Oddfoz. Song: "???" by ???
39b	19b	"A Tale of Two Twins"	Guy Moore	Ghia Godfree	Kiara Zhao	July 24, 2020	219	0.22
Scooter and Skeeter get dragged by the babies on different activities.
40a	20a	"Rise of the Pickler"	Guy Moore	Jeff King	Kelsey Norden	August 7, 2020	220	0.33
Gonzo forgets to say thank you when Animal helps him out, leaving him feeling unappreciated.
40b	20b	"Friend-a-versary"	Guy Moore	Ghia Godfree	Cynthia Petrovic	August 7, 2020	220	0.33
Summer and Piggy search for the perfect gift to give each other on their "friend-a-versary".
41a	21a	"Sherlock Nose"	Guy Moore	Max Beaudry & Francisco Paredes	Stan Ruiz	August 21, 2020	221	0.38
Sherlock Nose is on the case of Miss Nanny's broken flower pot.
41b	21b	"Block Busters"	Guy Moore	Ghia Godfree, Max Beaudry & Francisco Paredes	Pez Hofmann	August 21, 2020	221	0.38
Piggy is jealous when Mr. Manny keeps getting distracted from playing Butterfly Tag with her. Song: "Look at Me!" by Piggy

=== Season 3 (2021–22) ===
No. overall	No. in series	Title	Directed by	Written by	Storyboard by	Original release date	Prod. code	US viewers (millions)
42a	1a	"Oh Brother"	Guy Moore	Ghia Godfree	Angie Henderson and Jina Noh	January 4, 2021	301	0.39
After Fozzie learns that his family is adopting a koala girl named Rozzie, he is nervous that he might be a bad big brother, so his friends help him prepare for his sister's arrival. Song: "Give Your Sister Your Love" by Miss Nanny
42b	1b	"Boo Boo Patrol"	Jeremy Jensen	Max Beaudry	Kelsey Norden	January 4, 2021	301	0.39
Fozzie is on Boo Boo patrol for Rozzie around the playroom. Song: "The Boo Boo Patrol" by Fozzie
43a	2a	"The Legend of El Tomahto"	Guy Moore	Max Beaudry	Pez Hofmann	January 5, 2021	302	0.40
Nanny is going to make something special for the Muppet Babies at snack time, and when Sweetums gets the tomato, he squishes it. The Muppets need to get the Legendary El Tomahto that Gonzo read about, but Sweetums messes up the mission because he's too strong.
43b	2b	"Interplanetary Kickle Ball"	Jeremy Jensen	Max Beaudry	Kiara Zhao	January 5, 2021	302	0.40
When Potato can't play "Kickle Ball," Kermit plays with Gonzo. But Gonzo gets fed up with Kermit losing, so he plays without letting the frog play. Song: "The Gonzonian Anthem" by the Gonzonians
44a	3a	"Summer's Disaster-Piece"	Guy Moore	Max Beaudry and Ghia Godfree	Cynthia Petrovic	January 6, 2021	303	0.44
Gonzo & Fozzie ruin Summer's painting for Miss Nanny. Song: "What's in this Picture?" by Gonzo
44b	3b	"Farewell, Statler, and Waldorf"	Jeremy Jensen	Francisco Paredes	Stan Ruiz	January 6, 2021	303	0.44
Due to a misunderstanding, the Muppet Babies believe that Statler and Waldorf are moving away.
45a	4a	"The Mystery of the Missing Pearls"	Guy Moore	Ghia Godfree	Angie Henderson	January 7, 2021	304	0.40
Piggy borrows her mom's pearls for a fancy dress-up party at the Playroom without asking her.
45b	4b	"Rowlf Gets the Blues"	Jeremy Jensen	Max Beaudry	Kelsey Norden	January 7, 2021	304	0.40
Rowlf's feeling blue about his mom going out of town, but he's determined not to show it. Song: "Puppy Dog Blues" by Rowlf
46a	5a	"The Copy Cub"	Guy Moore	Ghia Godfree	Pez Hofmann	January 8, 2021	305	0.36
Fozzie is trying to practice for his joke show but his little sister Rozzie keeps repeating what he says and accidentally makes 3 Rozzies. Song: "Rozzies Everywhere" by Fozzie
46b	5b	"Animal Loses It"	Jeremy Jensen	Francisco Paredes	Kiara Zhao	January 8, 2021	305	0.36
Animal keeps losing at every game and almost quits on Scooter and Skeeter's game. Song: "Banana-Wamma-Jungle-Jamma" by Scooter & Skeeter (twice)
47a	6a	"Gonzo's Bubble Trouble"	Jeremy Jensen	Francisco Paredes	Angie Henderson	January 22, 2021	306	0.31
Despite being told not to, Gonzo goes into Bunsen and Beaker's invention room.
47b	6b	"Fozzie Can't Bear It"	Guy Moore	Max Beaudry and Sarah Eisenberg	Kelsey Norden	January 22, 2021	306	0.31
Fozzie panics when Kermit is gone for two whole days.
48a	7a	"Muppet Space Camp"	Guy Moore	Ghia Godfree and Max Beaudry	Kiara Zhao	February 12, 2021	307	0.50
The Muppets set up a space camp to help Carlos not be afraid when they go to space to see Henson's Comet. Song: "Friends by my Side" by Kermit and Carlos
48b	7b	"The Best Best Friend Beach Day"	Jeremy Jensen	Ghia Godfree and Becky Wangberg	Pez Hofmann	February 12, 2021	307	0.50
Piggy and Summer have planned three things to take pictures of for their scrapbook when they go to the beach, but things don't go as planned. Song: "Go With the Flow" by Kermit
49a	8a	"The Ribbiter"	Guy Moore	Francisco Paredes	Cynthia Petrovic	February 26, 2021	308	0.40
When Robin decides he wants to join Gonzo, Animal, and Fozzie as a villain, Kermit plans to make sure it doesn't happen.
49b	8b	"Presto Uh Oh"	Jeremy Jensen	Becky Wangberg	Stan Ruiz and Bill Breneisen	February 26, 2021	308	0.40
After accidentally destroying a fan for Summer's magic show, Piggy uses magic to fix it, providing disastrous results. Song: "Presto Penguini" and reprise by Summer
50a	9a	"Lone Eagle"	Jeremy Jensen	Max Beaudry	Stan Ruiz	March 12, 2021	309	0.43
Sam Eagle visits the playroom, and the Muppet Babies try to show him a good time.
50b	9b	"The Fellowship of the Rainbow Yo-Yo"	Guy Moore	Francisco Paredes	Cynthia Petrovic	March 12, 2021	309	0.43
When the Muppet Babies fear a rainbow yo-yo threatens to destroy their friendship, they go on a quest to throw it into a volcano.
51a	10a	"Kermit and Fozzie's Eggcellent Adventure"	Guy Moore	Max Beaudry	Stan Ruiz and Pez Hofmann	March 26, 2021	310	0.43
Kermit and Fozzie team up for an Easter egg hunt. Song: "Make a Plan"
51b	10b	"Animal and the Little Accident"	Jeremy Jensen	Ghia Godfree	Cynthia Petrovic	March 26, 2021	310	0.43
When the Muppet Babies use their imagination to set off to find the legendary lost city of Ratlantis, Animal doesn't want to miss a thing, but he forgets to use the bathroom beforehand.
52a	11a	"Backyard Safari"	Jeremy Jensen	Francisco Paredes	Stan Ruiz	April 16, 2021	311	0.37
Fozzie takes his friends, and Rozzie, on a safari for a creature called the Crocapoodle, not knowing he just made it up to impress his little sister. Song: "I Know a Lot About Animals" by Fozzie
52b	11b	"The Invisible Frog"	Guy Moore	Francisco Paredes	Cynthia Petrovic and Stephanie Alexander	April 16, 2021	311	0.37
Kermit arrives wearing pajamas, thinking it's Pajama Day, only to realize it's Fun and Games Day. To avoid being embarrassed, he tries Bunsen and Beaker's latest invention to make himself invisible. Song: "Invisible" by Kermit.
53a	12a	"Best Pals Pizza Delivery"	Jeremy Jensen	Max Beaudry	Bill Breneisen	April 23, 2021	312	0.46
Fozzie and Kermit add a delivery system to their pizza parlor, but the latter gets distracted watching "Wacky Alpacas" and helping the main character, Walter with his own dilemma.
53b	12b	"Summer the Science Penguin"	Guy Moore	Ghia Godfree	Angie Henderson and Stephanie Alexander	April 23, 2021	312	0.46
Inspired by Bunsen and Beaker's work, Summer attempts to use science to help Fozzie with his picture of Sir Featherbrain, by creating super sticky noodles. Song: "If You Stick to It" by Miss Nanny
54a	13a	"A Very Sticker Situation"	Jeremy Jensen	Francisco Paredes	Kiara Zhao	April 30, 2021	313	0.39
When Miss Nanny brings out her sticker book, Jill, the new frog girl from across the street, offers to organize it.
54b	13b	"Boo Boo Bamboozle"	Guy Moore	Francisco Paredes	Pez Hofmann and Bill Breneisen	April 30, 2021	313	0.39
Jill decides to fake an injury to gain attention from the Muppet Babies. Song: "Anything You Need" by the Muppet Babies and Jill
55a	14a	"It's Not Easy Being Greeny"	Guy Moore	Robyn Brown	Cynthia Petrovic and Stephanie Alexander	May 7, 2021	314	0.40
Summer begins to worry when she notices that Greeny McPlant Plant is looking less robust than usual. Song: "Every Life is Like A Story" by Miss Nanny
55b	14b	"Dueling Harmonicas"	Jeremy Jensen	Becky Wangberg	Stan Ruiz and Stephanie Alexander	May 7, 2021	314	0.40
After stubbing his toe, Rizzo decides that he wants to play harmonica for the talent show. Song: "That's How You Play the Harmonica" by Fozzie and Rizzo
56a	15a	"Best in Chicken Show"	Jeremy Jensen	Max Beaudry	Stan Ruiz	May 14, 2021	315	0.29
Rizzo and Gonzo compete with Camilla and Patch respectively, to see which chick is superior. Songs: "" by Rizzo and Patch, "" by Gonzo and Camilla
56b	15b	"No Takesies Backsies"	Guy Moore	Francisco Paredes	Cynthia Petrovic and Bill Breneisen	May 14, 2021	315	0.29
Piggy gives her favorite bracelet to Rozzie, but starts questioning her actions after seeing how much fun the young cub is having with it. Song: "Anything I Imagine it to Be" by Rozzie
57a	16a	"Sam and the Skyscraper"	Jeremy Jensen	Hanah Lee Cook	Pez Hofmann and Bill Breneisen	June 25, 2021	316	0.49
Miss Nanny gives Sam and the Muppet Babies a new block city construction set. Song: "By the Box" by Sam
57b	16b	"Animal Too Loud"	Guy Moore	Sarah Eisenberg	Kiara Zhao	June 25, 2021	316	0.49
The Muppet Babies' fun day with Mr. Manny, Mr. Statler, and Mr. Waldorf at the library is nearly ruined by Animal's loudness.
58a	17a	"Rozzie and the Big Bad Sound"	Jeremy Jensen	Ghia Godfree	Jina Noh	July 2, 2021	317	0.27
While Rozzie is visiting the Playroom, she gets scared by a thunderstorm, and the other Muppets group together to help her out. Song: "That's How You Get Thunder" by Sweetums as the Cloud Giant
58b	17b	"Muppets of the Caribbean"	Guy Moore	Becky Wangberg	Angie Henderson and Bill Breneisen	July 2, 2021	317	0.27
Jill loses Lady Sparkle, so Summer suggests she's at the Island of Lost Toys. Song: "Tidy Up" by Summer
59a	18a	"Robin Digs Deep"	Guy Moore	Max Beaudry	Jina Noh	July 9, 2021	318	0.50
Robin doesn't want to need his blankie every time he feels scared, so he asks Animal to hide it from him. Song: "We're Diggin'" by Kermit and the Muppet Babies
59b	18b	"Fozzie and the Fairy Tea Party"	Jeremy Jensen	Sarah Eisenberg	Kiara Zhao	July 9, 2021	318	0.50
Fozzie feels replaced when Rozzie wants to play with Summer and Piggy. Song: "Brothers Are The Best" by Fozzie
60a	19a	"Gonzo-rella"	Guy Moore	Ghia Godfree	Angie Henderson	July 23, 2021	319	0.23
Gonzo wants to go to Piggy and Summer's royal ball dressed as a princess.
60b	19b	"Summer's Car Trouble"	Jeremy Jensen	Max Beaudry and Francisco Paredes	Pez Hofmann	July 23, 2021	319	0.23
Summer brings a toy car she made with her grandpa to show-and-tell.
61a	20a	"Rootin' Tootin' Sheriff Showdown"	Guy Moore	Sarah Eisenberg	Angie Henderson	August 13, 2021	320	0.35
Piggy and Gonzo both want to be sheriff when the Snack Time Bandits vow to steal the milk and cookies from Spud Junction.
61b	20b	"The Trouble with Chickies"	Jeremy Jensen	Becky Wangberg	Jina Noh	August 13, 2021	320	0.35
Animal makes friends with an alien on planet Koozebane.
62a	21a	"Phantom of the Dollhouse"	Guy Moore	Max Beaudry	Cynthia Petrovic and Bill Breneisen	August 27, 2021	321	0.28
When Miss Nanny brings a dollhouse to the playroom, no one is more excited than Jill. Songs: "Wonderful Dollhouse" by Jill
62b	21b	"Tarzanimal"	Jeremy Jensen	Becky Wangberg	Joe Apel	August 27, 2021	321	0.28
Animal loves to play like Tarzan in the jungle, so he declares himself Tarzanimal. Song: "Let's Get Wild" by Animal and reprise by Sweetums as Tarzan
63a	22a	"Scooter MVP"	Guy Moore	Ghia Godfree	Jina Noh	September 17, 2021	322	N/A
Fearing her twin brother Scooter will quit sports, Skeeter plans to fake losing games to boost his confidence, which gets tough after Sweetums challenges them to marshmallow dodgeball.
63b	22b	"Rizzo for Mayor"	Jeremy Jensen	Max Beaudry	Angie Henderson	September 17, 2021	322	N/A
To win the first playroom mayor election against Summer, Rizzo makes up spectacular promises, and he struggles to meet his friends expectations.
64a	23a	"Kitchen Catastrophe"	Jeremy Jensen	Max Beaudry	Pez Hofmann	September 24, 2021	323	N/A
Swedish Chef believes Gonzo's cooking to be disgusting, and refuses to eat any of it. Song: "Piggy's Diner" by the Muppet Babies
64b	23b	"Kermit Gets the Grumpies"	Mr. Warburton	Max Beaudry & Francisco Paredes	Kiara Zhao	September 24, 2021	323	N/A
When the normally jovial Kermit is in a very bad mood, Bunsen and Beaker try to help him, using their latest invention. Song: "Can't Run From the Grumpies"
65a	24a	"Oh My Gourd"	Jeremy Jensen	Ghia Godfree & Max Beaudry	Kelsey Norden	October 1, 2021	324	N/A
Kermit uses Bunsen and Beaker's Grow-inator to make his pumpkin grow more quickly. Song: "" by Kermit
65b	24b	"The Curse of the Wereanimal"	Guy Moore	Sarah Eisenberg	Angie Henderson	October 1, 2021	324	N/A
After eating too much candy, Animal gets a bad stomachache that turns him into the Wereanimal. Upon hearing this, the other Muppets have to fix him before their Halloween party starts.
66a	25a	"Moon Muffins"	Guy Moore	Francisco Paredes	Chris Otsuki	October 15, 2021	325	N/A
The gang bakes Moon Muffins, but Rizzo would rather relax than bake.
66b	25b	"Muppet Newsflash"	Jeremy Jensen	Sarah Eisenberg & Becky Wangberg	Stan Ruiz	October 15, 2021	325	N/A
Piggy starts a news show, and hires Summer and Kermit as reporters. But they fear the news in the backyard isn't exciting enough, so they compete by exaggerating their stories.
67a	26a	"Eagle in the Middle"	Jeremy Jensen	Hanah Lee Cook	Kelsey Norden	November 12, 2021	326	N/A
Sam is caught between the other Muppets, who form two separate groups to persuade him to choose either "Wacky Alpacas" or "Zorna" for Scribble Screen time.
67b	26b	"Rizzo's Space Race"	Guy Moore	Sarah Eisenberg & Becky Wangberg	Kiara Zhao	November 12, 2021	326	N/A
Rizzo gets in trouble with Patch, after calling her a bad name he heard while watching a show meant for bigger kids. Song: "Building Rizzo's Race Car" by Rizzo and the Muppet Babies
68a	27a	"It's a Wonderful Elf-bot"	Mr. Warburton	S : Sarah Eisenberg, Ghia Godfree & Becky Wangberg; T : Robyn Brown	Angie Henderson	November 27, 2021	327	N/A
The Muppet Babies use Bunsen and Beaker's latest device, the Elf-bot, to make gifts for Statler and Waldorf, only to get greedy with their own presents, so much so, they run out of materials. Song "Elf-Bot Song" by the Muppet Babies
68b	27b	"A Merry Litter Christmas"	Jeremy Jensen	Ghia Godfree	Jina Noh	November 27, 2021	327	N/A
After one of Bunsen and Beaker's inventions go wrong, the Muppets travel to Planet Gonzo to help clean up. Song: "Muppet Little Christmas" by the Muppet Babies
69a	28a	"A Mitzvah for Miss Nanny"	Jeremy Jensen	Sarah Eisenberg and Becky Wangberg	Kiara Zhao	November 28, 2021	328	N/A
Upon hearing Miss Nanny say she's going to be making mitzvahs for Hanukkah, the Muppet Babies get the idea to make their own mitzvahs. Songs: "It's a Hanukkah Party" by the Muppet Rocksplosion & "It's a Mitzvah" by Miss Nanny and the Muppet Babies
69b	28b	"Winter Sport-a-thon"	Guy Moore	Max Beaudry	Pez Hofmann	November 28, 2021	328	N/A
Gonzo & Skeeter have a Winter Sport-a-thon. Song: "Ties Your Shoes" by Scooter, Skeeter and the Muppet Babies
70a	29a	"Happy Villain-tine's Day"	Guy Moore	Sarah Eisenberg	Kiara Zhao & Bill Breneisen	January 14, 2022	329	N/A
Gonzo turns into his alter-ego, Dr. Meanzo, when he thinks nobody made him a valentine. Song: "This is Villain-tine's Day" by Gonzo as Dr. Meanzo
70b	29b	"My Best Toy's Wedding"	Jeremy Jensen	Becky Wangberg	Pez Hofmann	January 14, 2022	329	N/A
Summer and Gonzo plan a wedding for their best toys.
71	30	"The Muppet Babies Show"	Jeremy Jensen and Guy Moore	Sarah Eisenberg, Ghia Godfree & Becky Wangberg	Stephanie Alexander, Pez Hofmann, Jina Noh, Chris Otsuki, and Stan Ruiz	February 18, 2022	330	N/A
The Muppet Babies feel excited to put on "The Muppet Babies Show" for all their friends before the Grand Finale Finish of playroom closes for summer vacation. Note: This is the series finale. Songs: "The Muppet Babies Show Theme" by the cast, "The Wheels on the Bus" by Animal, Beaker, and Swedish Chef, "Goodbye just means see you later (Thanks for all the laughs)" by the cast

== Shorts ==
=== Muppet Babies Show and Tell ===
No.	Title	Original release date
1	"Kermit and Piggy's Show and Tell"	March 2, 2018
2	"Fozzie's Show and Tell"	March 2, 2018
3	"Piggy's Show and Tell"	March 2, 2018
4	"The Great Muppet Musical"	March 2, 2018
5	"Piggy and Gonzo's Show and Tell"	March 2, 2018
6	"Kermit and Fozzie's Show and Tell"	March 2, 2018
7	"Summer's Show and Tell"	March 2, 2018
8	"Kermit's Show and Tell"	March 2, 2018
9	"Gonzo's Show and Tell"	March 2, 2018
10	"Animal's Show and Tell"	March 2, 2018

=== Muppet Babies Play Date ===
No.	Title	Original release date
1	"Let's Play Together"	May 17, 2019
2	"Joking Around with Fozzie"	July 1, 2019
3	"Cloud Watching"	July 1, 2019
4	"Gonzo Says"	July 1, 2019
5	"Kermit's Cookie Caper"	July 1, 2019
6	"Gonzo's Dance Emergency"	July 1, 2019
7	"Cup Stacking"	July 1, 2019
8	"Nursery Rhyme Theater"	July 1, 2019
9	"Fetch Animal"	July 1, 2019
10	"Piggy's Fashion Show"	July 1, 2019
11	"Games with Potato"	July 1, 2019
12	"Kermit's Sing-a-Long"	July 1, 2019
