= Patrol 03 =

French cartoon of 1997

- DVD cover
- Genre: Crime; Comedy
- Created by: Christophe Izard
- Directed by: Alain Sion
- Countries of origin: Canada; France; Germany; Luxembourg
- Original languages: English; French
- No. of episodes: 26

Production
- Executive producers: Giovanna Milano; Micheline Charest; Ronald A. Weinberg
- Producer: Christophe Izard
- Running time: 20–22 minutes
- Production companies: CINAR Films; France Animation; Ravensburger Film + TV; Videal; Neuroplanet

Original release
- Network: Teletoon (Canada); France 3 (France); RTL 2 (Germany)
- Release: December 5, 1997 – June 3, 1998

Patrol 03 is an animated television series that aired from December 5, 1997 to June 3, 1998 and was broadcast on Teletoon in Canada and France 3 in France.

== Plot ==
The show centers around a trio of animal police officers called Shorty, Wilfred and Carmen; who solve crimes in the city of Los Diablos as "Patrol 03" - most of the police force considers them a joke and looks them down due to the minor assignments they get and their broken-down patrol car. The main villains of the show are the power-hungry Police Chief Pamela Bondani, who wants to become the town's mayor, and her mole assistant Professor Molo. The two are always trying to take over the city using various schemes while Bondani assigns Patrol 03 with various meaningless tasks to keep them out of the way.

== Characters ==
- Shorty (voiced by: Sébastien Desjours (original), Bruce Dinsmore (dubbed)) a Basset Hound, is the de facto leader of the trio. His body is so elastic that it can even stretch to a certain degree.
- Wilfred (voiced by: Patrick Floersheim (original), Rick Jones (dubbed)) a large rat, serves as the brawn of the trio. because of his unusually large size and strength.
- Carmen (voiced by: Laurence Saquet (original), Sonja Ball (dubbed)) a paraplegic blue fox that has a wheelchair containing gadgets, which help the trio in their adventures.
- Police Chief Pamela Bondani (voiced by: Françoise Pavy (original), Jennifer Seguin (dubbed)) a cat, is the corrupt head of the police department. The trio are aware of her corrupt nature but pretend not to know as to avoid blowing their cover so they can get enough evidence to bring her to justice.
- Lieutenant Rhino (voiced by: Alain Flick (original), Terrence Scammell (dubbed)) a rhinoceros, is Pamela's second in command, who has a tendency to laugh hard enough to cause an earth tremor. He is very naive and is unaware of his chief's malevolent nature.
- Alfredo a bloodhound, is the prison warden of the security compound.
- Professor Molo (voiced by: Vincent Violette (original), Arthur Holden (dubbed)) a mole, is an ex-convict, mad scientist and genius and Pamela's partner-in-crime who assist her on her nefarious schemes to take over the city, usually by creating some sort of monster or gadget.
- Mayor Alexander Walrus (voiced by: Jean-François Kopf (original), Walter Massey (dubbed)) is mayor of the city of Los Diablos and the one who trained Patrol 03 personally. Patrol 03 acts as the mayor's personal spies and informants on what the Police Chief is doing and gather enough evidence to put her away for good. The mayor is aware of Pamela's corruption and had Patrol 03 sent to the station to not only keep an eye on her but to ensure the city's well-being as they are the only honest police officers who does the actual work.
- Snap (voiced by: Mathieu Buscatto (original), A.J. Henderson (dubbed)) a crocodile, is the city mechanic. He provides the trio the gadgets and inventions they need on their adventures against crime. He has a crush on Carmen.

== Series overview ==
Season	Episodes	Originally released	
Season	Episodes	First released	Last released
1	9	December 5, 1997	December 31, 1997
2	20	January 3, 1998	June 3, 1998

== Episodes ==
=== Season 1 (1997) ===
No.	Title	Original release date
1	"The Hiccups"	December 5, 1997
Patrol 03 enter the police force and are sent by Mayor Walrus to find evidence against Pamela Bondani. Pamela bails out Molo to create a monster that will ruin Walrus' charity parade.
2	"The Shrinking Mayor"	December 10, 1997
3	"The Electro Zapper Sapper"	December 10, 1997
4	"Look Out for Gloop"	December 13, 1997
5	"Electro Zapper Sapper"	December 17, 1997
Mayor Walrus promotes electric cars to solve the city's pollution crisis. The solution backfires when Molo unleashes his Electro Zapper Sapper, which blows every electrical device. Wilfred creates his own electric monster to battle the Zapper Sapper.
6	"Howling Madness"	December 20, 1997
Molo creates a small but noisy monster in order to disrupt an opera singer's performance, but a mysterious wolf is also interested in the monster.
7	"Operation Molehill"	December 24, 1997
After Mayor Walrus chooses Lieutenant Rhino to go against a famous wrestler, Molo decides to go supersized and create tremors to disrupt the event.
8	"Subrubberway"	December 27, 1997
Molo creates a long monster made of rubber to eat up Los Diablos' new subway.
9	"Diabolical Scheme"	December 31, 1997

=== Season 2 (1998) ===
No.	Title	Original release date
1	"No Time for Tanning"	January 3, 1998
Molo creates a "polar cold concentrate" and unleashes it during the opening of some new public showers at the beach.
2	"The Laffomaniac"	January 7, 1998
3	"Exodactyl"	January 10, 1998
Molo creates a monster which causes extreme bad luck, which Pamela attempts to unleash during a presidential visit.
4	"Going Bugs"	January 14, 1998
5	"Fleeifinger"	January 17, 1998
6	"Colours of the Rainbow"	January 21, 1998
7	"Guest in the Machine"	January 24, 1998
Molo the mad scientist unleashes a goop that turns any machine it possesses into a monster. Snap tames the monster, while wanted criminal Joe Bull tries to revolutionise his new bus transport against Snap's.
8	"A Nut at the Opera"	January 28, 1998
Patrol 03 is charged with protecting a temperamental opera singer (the same one from 'Howling Madness') as Bondani plans to humiliate her by throwing a pie in her face.
9	"The Inviserator"	January 31, 1998
10	"Soft on Crime"	February 4, 1998
11	"Superbatimayor vs. Godzikong"	February 7, 1998
12	"Gigi's Ritzy's Camel Number 8"	February 11, 1998
13	"The Case of the Sparkling Banana"	February 14, 1998
14	"The Shrinking Mayor"	February 18, 1998
15	"A Load of Rubbish"	February 21, 1998
16	"A Whole New Ball Game"	February 25, 1998
Pamela tries to get her hands on the Mayor's new "wishing ball".
17	"Operation TV"	February 28, 1998
18	"The Hiccup Monster"	March 7, 1998
19	"The Monster Buggles"	March 11, 1998
20	"Bring Up Walrus"	June 3, 1998
Pamela gets Molo to regress Walrus into a baby making him look incompetent and becoming unpopular. Patrol 03 get the antidote formula from Molo. Molo is put back in prison and Pamela is demoted and reduced to a traffic warden.
