= L'Île aux enfants =

French children's television show

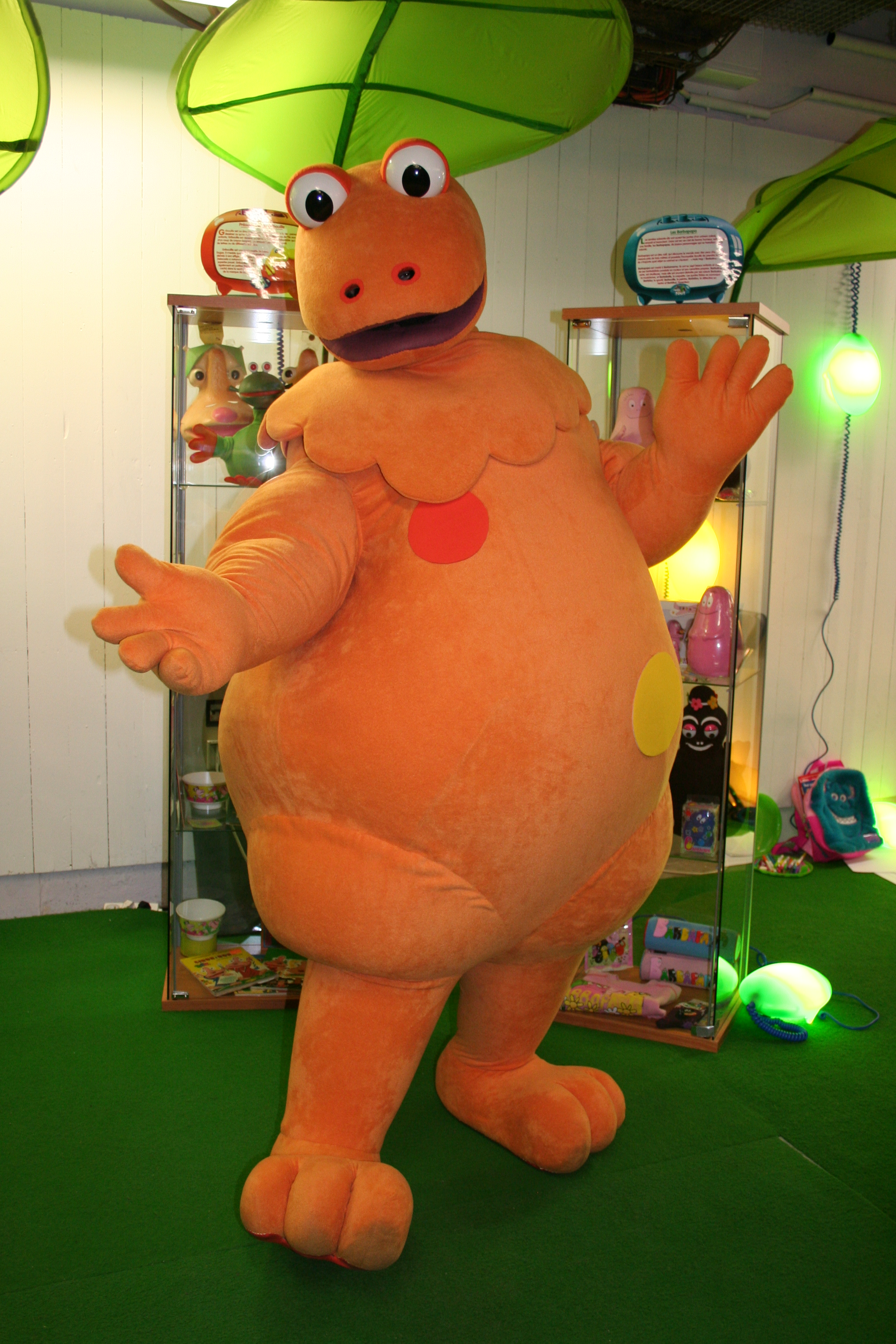
Casimir, the mascot of the show

L'Île aux enfants is a French children's television series that was broadcast from 1974 to 1982. The show was broadcast first as part of the youth program Jeunes Années on the third color channel of the ORTF from September 16, 1974 to January 3, 1975, then from January 6, 1975 to February 14, 1975 as a separate program on FR3 before being broadcast for seven consecutive seasons on TF1 every late afternoon at 6 p.m. from February 17, 1975 to June 30, 1982.

== History ==
=== Bonjour Sésame ===
In 1974, Jean-Louis Guillaud, general director of the third color channel of the ORTF, asked Christophe Izard to adapt the American educational program Sesame Street for France for the 1974 season.

Under the title Bonjour Sésame, twenty-minute episodes were to alternately show scenes with foam puppets and scenes with real actors.

With 13 minutes of Sesame Street sequences and a 4-minute animal documentary by Pascale Breugnot, Christophe Izard had to develop a concept for the remaining 4 minutes. Surrounded by a team of a few people, including Yves Brunier, he then created the sequence for L'ìle aux enfants with the figure of Casimir.

=== Adapting the pilot ===
However In 1973, a pilot was created for the show under the title of “Rue Sésame” which at the time was a pilot for the show which featured a character with the name of Plocus (green dinosaur) and a grouch named Oscar (named after the American Muppet Oscar from Sesame Street).

=== L'Île aux enfants ===
Starting from 6 January 1975 Bonjour Sésame gave way to L'Île aux enfants, which turned into a separate show.

From January 1975 to 1976, one module of the program L'Île aux enfants consisted of French-synchronized sequences of the American original under the title "Bonjour Sésame"; another module was "L'Univers de Casimir" (Casimir's Universe).

From 1976, L'Île aux enfants no longer contained sequences from Sesame Street, but consisted of French productions for the entire 20 minutes.

In 1977 a new character called Hippolyte, Casimir's green cousin, appeared. He first appeared in 1976 under the name Cousin Albéric.

=== Thousandth broadcast and end ===
On May 7, 1980, TF1 celebrated the thousandth broadcast, making Casimir extraordinary announcer of the station, remarkably taking the place of Carole Varenne.

Called upon to constantly renew himself and to nurture new television projects for children, Christophe Izard put a final point to his creation. Casimir was retired on June 30, 1982. In September 1982, Christophe Izard proposed Le Village dans les nuages (The Village in the Clouds), in which some of the actors of L'Île aux enfants would participate.

=== Reruns ===
In 1992 host Jean-Luc Delarue called for the return of the gentle monster to French screens during an episode of la Grande Famille on Canal+, dedicated to the childhood memories of young adults and featuring Casimir (Yves Brunier). The call was heard the following year and the best episodes were rebroadcast every evening at 6 p.m. on Canal J from September 6, 1993 to June 1998, followed by a short live sequence hosted by Casimir and Léonard le Renard.

From early 2002 to 2003, about a hundred episodes were rebroadcast on France 5 in the program Bonsoir les Zouzous.

In Quebec, the series was broadcast on TVFQ 99.

== Adaptation for South Africa ==
From October 6, 1979 to 1981 an Afrikaans version of L'Île aux enfants entitled Casimir was broadcast in South Africa, directed by Louise Smit and Dalene Kotzé, in co-production with the French production company Télécip and the South African SABC.

The sets are slightly modified and actors from South Africa (Siegfried Mynhardt, Willie Esterhuizen, Annelize van der Ryst-Hattingh, Tarina Kleyn and Johan van der Merwe) play the roles of the characters.

In the midst of apartheid, the program showed only white children, which is why Louise Smit left the SABC. With the advent of TV2 and TV3 in 1982, however, black children also began to appear.

== In popular culture ==
- A part of the lyrics from the opening credits song by Roger Pouly was taken up by the French rap group Assassin for their song Quand j'étais petit from the album L'Homicide volontaire (1995).
- The opening credits of the show also serve as opening credits for Maïwenn's film Polisse (2011).
- A parody of Casimir appears in the French adult animated series Les Kassos (The Wakos in English) as Zizimir. The character is accused of pedophilia but tries to deny it. In the English dub, the character was changed to a Barney parody named Horney.

== Characters ==
- Casimir: Yves Brunier. An anthropomorphic orange dinosaur with yellow and red spots. He appeared for the first time on television on September 16, 1974 on French television. Size : 1.90 meters; Weight : 150 kilograms; Character : Funny, generous, naive; Favourite food : Gloubi-boulga.
- Albéric and later Hippolyte, Casimir's cousin: Gérard Camoin
- Léonard le Renard: Boris Scheigam
- François: Patrick Bricard
- Julie: Éliane Gauthier
- Mademoiselle (Edmée) Futaie: Marie-Noëlle Chevalier
- Monsieur (Fulbert Anselme) du Snob: Jean-Louis Terrangle(fr)
- The postman Émile Campagne: Henri Bon
- Monsieur (Albert) Travling: Sacha Briquet
- Marie Chanson: Marie Myriam
- Albertine: Geneviève Brunet
- Sabrina: Anne Ludovik
