= Muppet Babies (2018 TV series) =

American animated television series

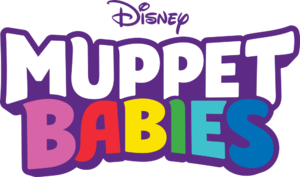
- Also known as: Disney Junior's Muppet Babies
- Genre: Adventure
- Based on: Characters by Jim Henson
- Developed by: Mr. Warburton; Chris Hamilton; Eric Shaw (screenwriter)
- Directed by: Guy Moore; Jeremy Jensen; Eric Shaw (screenwriter) (live action Dr. Teeth segment; Season 1, Episode 10): Collette Sunderman (dialogue director)
- Voices of: Matt Danner; Melanie Harrison; Dee Bradley Baker; Benjamin Diskin; Eric Bauza; Jessica DiCicco; Jenny Slate
- Theme music composer: Michelle Lewis; Kay Hanley; Dan Petty
- Opening theme: "Muppet Babies Theme 2018" (performed by Renée Elise Goldsberry)
- Ending theme: "Muppet Babies Theme 2018" (instrumental)
- Composers: Andy Bean; Keith Horn
- Country of origin: United States
- Original language: English
- No. of seasons: 3
- No. of episodes: 71 (141 segments) (list of episodes)

Production
- Executive producers: Mr. Warburton; Chris Hamilton (seasons 2–3)
- Producers: Joe Sichta (season 1); Eric Shaw (screenwriter) co-producer, (seasons 1 & 2)
- Animator: Snowball Studios
- Running time: 23 minutes
- Production companies: Oddbot Animation; The Muppets Studio; Disney Branded Television (Note: Credited as Disney Junior.)

Original release
- Network: Disney Junior
- Release: March 23, 2018 – February 18, 2022

Related
- The Muppets (2015–2016); Muppets Now (2020); Muppet Babies (1984–1991)

Disney's Muppet Babies is an American animated television series featuring toddler versions of the Muppets characters that began airing on Disney Jr. on March 23, 2018, and is aimed at a target audience of children from ages 4–7. It is a reboot of the original 1984 animated series of the same name, which, in turn, was inspired by a fantasy sequence from the film The Muppets Take Manhattan released earlier that same year. 71 episodes were produced.

The show retains several of the younger incarnations of the classic Muppet characters seen in the previous series, including Kermit the Frog, Miss Piggy, Fozzie Bear, The Great Gonzo, and Animal. The series also sees the second appearance of Nanny (now known as "Miss Nanny"), and the first appearance of a new Muppet Babies series member named Summer Penguin.

The series finale aired on February 18, 2022.

== Premise ==
The show details the playroom antics of Kermit the Frog, Miss Piggy, Summer Penguin, Fozzie Bear, Animal, and The Great Gonzo and a cast of other characters using their imaginations in the playroom and beyond, The Muppet Babies also live with their human caretaker, Miss Nanny (who is the daughter of the original Nanny from the 1984 series)

== Episodes ==
Season	Episodes	Originally released	
Season	Episodes	First released	Last released
Shorts	22	March 2, 2018	July 1, 2019
1	20	March 23, 2018	May 3, 2019
Special		August 3, 2018	
2	21	August 9, 2019	August 21, 2020
3	30	January 4, 2021	February 18, 2022

== Characters ==
=== Main ===
- Kermit (voiced by Matt Danner) is a level-headed and friendly frog who enjoys acting out adventure and making music with his banjo. However, he can get flustered rather easily, usually by the antics of those around him. Kermit is also the official leader of the Muppet Babies, as he is typically the one who helps devise their plans.
- Piggy (voiced by Melanie Harrison) is a temperamental and self-centered pig who considers herself a star and harbors a crush on Kermit. She mostly speaks in a high pitched voice but would at times greatly deepen when she gets passionate or angry. She is best friends with Skeeter and Summer.
- Fozzie (voiced by Eric Bauza) is a cheerful and goofy bear who aspires to be a comedian, but also shows skills as a ventriloquist, magician, and a musician like his two best friends, Kermit and Rowlf. While adorable and good-hearted, Fozzie also has a mischievous streak, as he is fond of playing practical jokes on the other Muppets. He can also get frightened rather easily, not sharing Gonzo's love of the paranormal and grotesque.
- Gonzo (voiced by Benjamin Diskin) is an eccentric and unpredictable alien who has a love for stunts and anything that can be considered strange.
- Animal (voiced by Dee Bradley Baker) is an excitable frenzied monster who likes playing the drums.
- Summer (voiced by Jessica DiCicco) is a good-hearted and sweet-natured penguin from the South Pole who loves to make art. She is best friends with Piggy.
- Miss Nanny (voiced by Jenny Slate) is the human teacher of the Muppet Babies and proprietor of her school. She is only seen from the neck down. The pattern on her stockings changes to reflect relevant elements in the episode plot. She won a gold medal in a gymnastics discipline at the Sport-A-Thon. In "A Mitzvah for Mrs. Nanny", it is revealed that Miss Nanny is Jewish and actually the daughter of Nanny from the original series.

=== Other Muppets ===
- Camilla (vocal effects provided by Melanie Harrison) is a white chick and Gonzo's best friend who is involved with the Muppet Babies' activities.
- Mr. Statler and Mr. Waldorf (voiced by Eric Bauza and Matt Danner) are the neighbors of Miss Nanny who often comment about the Muppet Babies' activities from the balcony of their home.
- Rizzo (voiced by Benjamin Diskin) is a self-centered and sarcastic rat who lives in the mouse hole in the school.
- Bunsen Honeydew (voiced by Eric Bauza) is a young aspiring scientist.
- Beaker (voiced by Matt Danner) is Bunsen's assistant.
- Dr. Teeth (performed by Bill Barretta) is the band leader of the Electric Mayhem. He appeared in a live-action transmission in "Muppet Rock" where he saw Animal perform backstage and is interested in having him join the Electric Mayhem. Animal turns him down for now as he needs to continue practicing.
- Rowlf (voiced by Matt Danner) is a fun-loving and friendly dog who loves to sing and make music, typically with his piano. He is best friends with Kermit and Fozzie, often acting as the middleman between the two.
- Sweetums (voiced by Dee Bradley Baker) is an ogre who lives next door to the school.
- Chef (voiced by Matt Danner) is a mock Swedish-speaking cooking prodigy.
- Robin (voiced by Eric Bauza) is a small polliwog who is Kermit's nephew. He has a tail due to being in his tadpole state.
- Scooter (voiced by Ogie Banks) is a young boy who wears a green and yellow track jacket.
- Skeeter (voiced by Cree Summer) is Scooter's athletic twin sister who wears a sports-inspired purple jacket, a baseball-shaped watch, and pig tails.
- Sam (voiced by Eric Bauza) is an eagle. In this show, Sam is shown to fly.
- Jill (voiced by Ashley Spillers) is a female frog from across the street who occasionally visits the other Muppet Babies.
- Pepe (voiced by Benjamin Diskin) is a prawn that appeared in Scooter's video game.
- The Newsman (voiced by Matt Danner) is a news anchor.

=== Other characters ===
- Priscilla (vocal effects provided by Dee Bradley Baker) is one of Camilla's fellow chicks who is yellow.
- Beep is one of Camilla's fellow chicks who is brown and makes the sound of a car horn instead of clucking.
- Carlos (voiced by Todrick Hall) is a blue frog that appears in "Frogs of a Feather". In "Frog Scouts", Carlos becomes part of the Frog Scouts alongside Kermit and Robin.
- Mr. Manny (voiced by Dulé Hill) is a friend of Miss Nanny's and the substitute teacher of the kids when Miss Nanny is unavailable. Like Miss Nanny, his head is never shown. Mr. Manny is known for saying where he states that a certain thing "is groovy" which is always accompanied by Mr. Manny doing horizontal gestures with his hands, bending his knees, and doing a motion that has him wiggle his hips. He is also shown to be a volunteer at the local library and the scout troop leader of the Frog Scouts.
- Orville H. Octopus (voiced by Dee Bradley Baker in "The Card Shark", Matt Danner in "Frog Scouts") is an animated purple octopus that appeared in the Muppet Babies' fantasies.
- Rozzie (voiced by Charlie Townsend) is a young koala who is Fozzie's adopted younger sister.

== Production ==
Unlike the previous series, the update is produced using computer-generated animation and features two 11-minute stories per episode. The series is aimed at children between the ages of four and seven.

Tom Warburton, best known for creating Cartoon Network's Codename: Kids Next Door, is the executive producer and Eric Shaw, former writer on Nickelodeon's SpongeBob SquarePants, is the story editor and co-producer. The show is a co-production between Disney Junior and The Muppets Studio.

=== Production lawsuit ===
On October 23, 2020, it was reported that original Muppet Babies writer Jeffrey Scott would sue The Walt Disney Company for using ideas that originated in the 1984 series without permission or credit. Scott also stated that he presented ideas and concepts to Disney in 2016 that were used without his permission. On January 27, 2021, Disney filed a motion to dismiss it. Disney argued that Scott had no legal grounds to sue because his ownership to the copyright had ceased when he filed for bankruptcy in 2003. The case was dismissed without prejudice on March 31, 2021.

However, in September 2022, a U.S. district judge declined Disney's request to officially dismiss the case, finding Disney had allegedly copied elements from Scott's production bible. Among the presented evidence was the "nanny character with her distinctive colored socks" and similarly-themed episodes between the original series and the reboot.

== Broadcast ==
The series premiered on Disney Junior on March 23, 2018, in the United States, the following day in Canada, and in Mexico on June 10.

On September 7, 2018, it was renewed for a second season which premiered eleven months later on August 9, 2019. On July 25, 2019, it was renewed for a third and final season, which premiered on January 4, 2021.

The shorts titled Show and Tell were later released on DisneyNow. The series was subsequently made available to stream on Disney+.

== Reception ==
=== Critical response ===
Emily Ashby of Common Sense Media gave Muppet Babies a grade of four out of five stars, complimented the presence of positive messages and role models, citing friendship and teamwork, and stated that the show promotes how imagination can be used for good, while noting the presence of educational value. Azure Hall and Casey Suglia of Romper included Muppet Babies in their "Great Shows Your Kids Will Love To Stream On Disney+" list, writing, "Even the hardest of hearts has to admit that the Muppet Babies are absolutely adorable. Revisit your favorite puppets, including Kermit, Fozzie, Piggy, Animal, Gonzo, and Summer during their younger years as they use their imagination for all of their adventures in their playroom. Not only are the Muppets super cute as babies, but this show also teaches kids how to use their creative thinking skills to help with small problems. It shows that using your imagination can make things fun and helpful at the same time."

=== Ratings ===
Viewership and ratings per season of Muppet Babies
Season	Episodes	First aired		Last aired		Avg. viewers (millions)	18–49 rank
Season	Episodes	Date	Viewers (millions)	Date	Viewers (millions)	Avg. viewers (millions)	18–49 rank
1	19	March 23, 2018	0.89	May 3, 2019	0.45	0.74	TBD

=== Accolades ===
Year	Award	Category	Nominee(s)	Result	Ref.
2018	TCA Awards	Outstanding Achievement in Youth Programming	Muppet Babies	Nominated	
2019	TCA Awards	Outstanding Achievement in Youth Programming	Muppet Babies	Nominated	
2019	Daytime Emmy Awards	Outstanding Preschool Animated Children's Series	Tom Warburton, Eric Shaw, Joe Sichta, Chris Hamilton, Sarah Finn, Kurt Weldon	Nominated	
2019	Daytime Emmy Awards	Outstanding Casting for an Animated Series or Special	Jennifer Trujillo	Nominated	
2019	Daytime Emmy Awards	Outstanding Performer in a Preschool Animated Program	Eric Bauza	Nominated	
2019	Daytime Emmy Awards	Outstanding Performer in a Preschool Animated Program	Ben Diskin	Won	
2020	Daytime Emmy Awards	Outstanding Short Format Children’s Program: Muppet Babies: Play Date	Tom Warburton, Matt Danner, Andy Bean	Nominated	
2020	Daytime Emmy Awards	Outstanding Performer in a Preschool Animated Program	Eric Bauza	Nominated	
2020	Daytime Emmy Awards	Outstanding Performer in a Preschool Animated Program	Matt Danner	Won	
2020	Daytime Emmy Awards	Outstanding Directing for a Preschool Animated Program	Matt Danner, Guy Moore, Collette Sunderman	Nominated	
2021	Annie Awards	Best Animated Television/Media Production for Preschool Children	Muppet Babies	Nominated	
2021	Daytime Emmy Awards	Outstanding Performer in a Preschool Animated Program	Eric Bauza	Nominated	
2021	Daytime Emmy Awards	Outstanding Sound Mixing and Sound Editing for a Preschool Animated Program	Kate Finan, Jacob Cook, Tess Fournier, Devon G. Bowman, Carol Ma, Brad Meyer, Sam Busekrus, Peter Munters and Xinyue Yu	Nominated	
2022	33rd GLAAD Media Awards	Outstanding Children’s Programming	Muppet Babies – "Gonzo-rella"	Nominated	
2022	Children's and Family Emmy Awards	Outstanding Writing for a Preschool Animated Program	Max Beaudry, Hanah Lee Cook, Sarah Eisenberg, Ghia Godfree, Francisco Paredes, Becky Wangberg, Robyn Brown	Won	
2022	Children's and Family Emmy Awards	Outstanding Directing for a Preschool Animated Program	Jeremy Jensen, Guy Moore, Matt Danner	Nominated	
