= Cauet =

Cauet is a French surname. Notable people with the surname include:

- Benoît Cauet (born 1969), French footballer
- Sébastien Cauet (born 1972), French radio and television presenter, DJ, comedian, and singer
