= Muppet Babies =

Muppet Babies may refer to:

- Muppet Babies (1984 TV series), the original 1984 series
- Muppet Babies (2018 TV series), the reboot of the original 1984 series
