= The Muppets Studio =

Subsidiary of The Walt Disney Company

The Muppets Studio, LLC
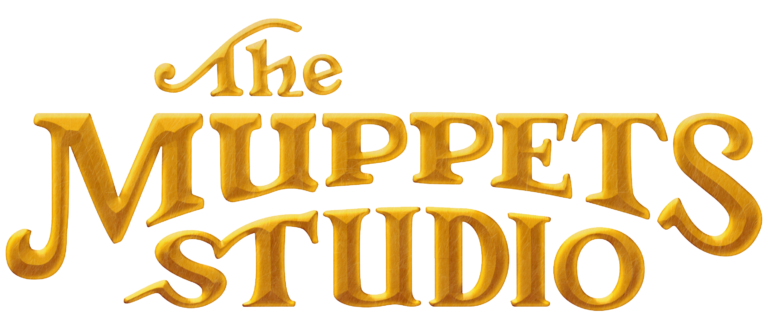
- Formerly: The Muppets Holding Company, LLC (2004–2007)
- Type: Subsidiary
- Industry: Entertainment
- Founded: February 14, 2004; 22 years ago
- Headquarters: Los Angeles, California, United States
- Key people: Leigh Slaughter (vice president)
- Products: Film; Television series
- Brands: The Muppets (2004–present); Bear in the Big Blue House (2004–2006)
- Number of employees: 5 (2015)
- Parent: Disney Consumer Products (2004–2006); Walt Disney Studios (2006–2015); Disney Consumer Products and Interactive Media (2015–2018); Disney Parks, Experiences and Products (2018–2020) Disney Live Entertainment (2020–present)
- Website: muppets.disney.com

The Muppets Studio, LLC is an American entertainment production company and subsidiary of the Walt Disney Company, that owns and produces media content for The Muppets franchise. The division was previously formed as The Muppets Holding Company, LLC on February 14, 2004, through Disney's acquisition of The Muppets and Bear in the Big Blue House intellectual properties from the Jim Henson Company.

The Muppets Studio manages the rights to The Muppets characters, including supervising their appearances across Disney's various divisions, as well as producing films, television series, specials, theme park attractions, music recordings, publishing, and live performances featuring the characters. The division currently operates as a specialty unit within Disney Live Entertainment, a part of Walt Disney Imagineering. The division does not own the characters from Sesame Street or Fraggle Rock, which are owned by Sesame Workshop and the Jim Henson Company, respectively.

== History ==
=== Background: Disney and Henson's failed merger ===
In the late-1980s, Jim Henson had been in talks with Disney CEO Michael Eisner to sell Jim Henson Productions to Disney. In August 1989, the two officially announced a deal for Disney to purchase Jim Henson Productions for $150 million. The deal fell through several months after Jim Henson's death in 1990.

Despite the collapse of the merger deal, by 1992, Disney and Jim Henson Productions had already struck a number of deals:

- Exclusive domestic rights to Henson theme park attractions in the western United States until May 1994 plus 2 year non-exclusively, including the design of two Muppet attractions at Walt Disney World
- Buena Vista Home Video's worldwide distribution rights to Henson's 300 hours of programming and a financing deal for up to 3 home video projects
- Certain cable television distribution rights for Disney Channel until 1997
- International distribution rights for existing television programming in free broadcast, cable or pay-per-view markets
- Theatrical distribution for The Muppet Christmas Carol (1992) and Muppet Treasure Island (1996) by Buena Vista Pictures Distribution under the Walt Disney Pictures label
- Dinosaurs co-production with Walt Disney Television
- In 1996, the Jim Henson Company produced Muppets Tonight for ABC, which had just been acquired by Disney.

The Henson family subsequently sold the entirety of the Jim Henson Company to German conglomerate EM.TV in 2000. In 2003, the Henson family repurchased The Jim Henson Company from EM.TV.

=== Disney acquisition and formation ===
Eisner, still interested in the Muppet properties, re-opened negotiations with the Hensons and announced the purchase of The Muppets and Bear in the Big Blue House assets from The Jim Henson Company for $75 million on February 17, 2004. The acquired Muppet assets were then placed into The Muppets Holding Company with Chris Curtin as general manager within Disney Consumer Products. One of the first appearances from the Muppets made after the purchase was on the television special The Nick and Jessica Variety Hour in April 2004, starring Nick Lachey and Jessica Simpson. A new website was launched in November 2004 and the Muppets made an appearance on the 2004 Christmas episode of Saturday Night Live.

The first Muppet production under full Disney control, The Muppets' Wizard of Oz, went into production immediately and aired on ABC in May 2005. On July 30, 2005, Animal and Pepe the King Prawn made appearance on The X Games 11 Preview show of All Access on ESPN2. Bear's first appearance under Disney's control was in the reality show, Breakfast with Bear in 2005.

A fiftieth birthday tour for Kermit, "Kermit's World Tour" was planned with leadership changes made just days before the tour began. The tour made its initial three stops before being canceled: Kermit, Texas; Johnson Space Center tour; and cake with The Rockettes at Radio City Music Hall, NYC. Following Eisner's exit from Disney, new CEO Bob Iger removed the head of the Muppets Holding Company and several senior staff members hand-picked by Eisner. The Muppets Holding Company was then paired with Baby Einstein (before it was acquired by Kids II, Inc. in 2013) under Senior Vice President and General Manager R. Russell Hampton Jr.

In October 2005, ABC commissioned America's Next Muppet, in which a script and five script outlines was written. However, ABC was reluctant to green light America's Next Muppet, and it never went into production. Instead, Disney's international TV division Buena Vista International Television (BVIT) licensed the Muppets out to TF1, a French television network, to produce Muppet TV in September 2006.

=== The Muppets Studio ===
In 2006, the Muppets Holding Company was transferred from the Disney Consumer Products unit to The Walt Disney Studios; with studio executives passing on oversight, the unit was placed in the special events group. That same year, Disney contracted Puppet Heap to rebuild, maintain, and create puppet characters for the Muppets Studio. In April 2007, the Muppets Holding Company changed its name to The Muppets Studio under new leadership by Special Events Group SVP Lylle Breier.

In 2008, The Muppets Studio began a licensing agreement with F.A.O. Schwarz to create a Muppet-themed boutique where customers can design their own Muppet. In 2013, Disney Theatrical Productions revealed that a show based on The Muppets was in active development and that a 15-minute show had been conducted by Thomas Schumacher to see how the technical components would work out.

The company was transferred in 2015 to Disney's new media unit, Disney Consumer Products and Interactive Media, specifically DCPI Labs. On April 3, 2015, a series of shorts named Muppet Moments premiered on Disney Junior. The series features conversations between the Muppets and young children. By April, Bill Prady was commissioned to write a script for a new Muppets pilot with the title The Muppets, which was greenlit by ABC, and ran for one season.

Disney Consumer Products and Interactive Media became part of Disney Parks, Experiences and Products in a March 2018 company reorganization. That same month, a reboot of the 1980s Muppet Babies series debuted on Disney Junior. A relaunch of the Muppets franchise was planned as of February 2018 for the then-unnamed Disney streaming service scheduled to be launched in 2019. Soon two series were under development for the Disney+ streaming service, the unscripted short-form series Muppets Now, and the scripted comedy Muppets Live Another Day. Live Another Day was from Adam Horowitz, Eddy Kitsis, and Josh Gad, and was planned as an eight-episode series which would depict events taking place after The Muppets Take Manhattan. The series was at ABC Signature Studios with a pilot order when Muppets Studios vice president Debbie McClellan departed and her replacement, Disney Parks Live Entertainment senior vice president David Lightbody, wanted a different take on the project. Unwilling to drop their concept, the creative trio left the project. Muppets Now continued development and premiered on the streaming service on July 31, 2020.

In 2021 Muppets Haunted Mansion, an original special that debuted in October 2021 on Disney+. The special would win Outstanding Art Direction/Set Decoration/Scenic Design at the inaugural Children's & Family Emmy Awards in 2022. According to TheWrap, multiple specials where planned with one centered around Big Thunder Mountain Railroad but never went into production.

In 2022, it was announced that ABC Signature and The Muppets Studio were developing a 10-episode series for Disney+ based on The Electric Mayhem, under the title The Muppets Mayhem, with Adam F. Goldberg, Jeff Yorkes and Muppet performer and writer Bill Barretta as showrunners and executive producers. The series would debut May 10, 2023, on Disney+ but would be cancelled after one season in November 2023. The series would win the Outstanding Children's or Family Viewing Series award at the Children's & Family Emmy Awards in 2024.

In September 2025, it was announced that The Muppets Studio, 20th Television and Point Grey Pictures were developing a new version of The Muppet Show with a special. The special will serve as a backdoor pilot for a potential revival/reboot of the original series. The special was directed by Alex Timberts with Albertina Rizzo as writer. Seth Rogen, Evan Goldberg and Muppet performers Matt Vogel and Eric Jacobson served as executive producers, alongside Sabrina Carpenter as a star and executive producer. The special had its Disney+ and ABC premiere on February 4, 2026 with universal acclaim from fans and critics praising it's humor and for being so faithful to the original 70's series. The special will end up earning six nominations at the 78th Primetime Emmy Awards with the special earning 4 awards. In September 2026, DEADLINE reported that talks about a pickup order for the reboot got stalled due creative differences between The Muppets Studio, 20th Television and Point Grey Pictures but that talks could resume given the Emmys wins.

In November 2025, it was announced that The Muppets Studio, Excellent Cadaver, Fruit Tree and Walt Disney Pictures were developing a Miss Piggy movie with Jennifer Lawrence and Emma Stone as executive producers and Cole Escola as writer.

In December 2025, Leigh Slaughter mentioned that The Muppets will appear "a lot more" at Disney theme parks and onboard Disney cruise ships in "live appearances from the characters on land and sea," during an interview with Time magazine.

In February 2026, TheWrap reported that The Walt Disney Company's new CEO Josh D'Amaro was looking into bringing "More Muppets material" into the parks and beyond.

In May 2026, FIFA announced that The Muppets alongside Sesame Street characters will be part of the first ever FIFA Final Halftime Show slated for July, 2026.

In June 2026, the studio announced a collaboration with Marvel Comics with "The Muppets Take Over The Marvel Universe", a one-shot comic in celebration of the 50th anniversary of The Muppet Show. In November 2026, Marvel Comics announced their second comic collaboration with Rock 'N' Roller Coaster Starring The Muppets — Play The Music!.

In July 2026, it was announced that Seth MacFarlane was teaming up with the studio and Walt Disney Records to develop a brand new "The Muppets" album under the orchestra genre. The following month, the name was announced to be "Seth MacFarlane Sings The Muppets" which featured 14 songs and was released on September 18. The album was a collaboration between Fuzzy Door Productions, Republic Records and Walt Disney Records.

In October 2026, it was announced that the studio would collaborate with Walmart for their annual holiday campaign with several commercials and social media ads inspired by The Muppets Christmas Carol. Walmart's CMO William White would cite that the success of The Muppet Show special and the FIFA Final Halftime Show allowed the characters to carry fresh relevance for the campaign.

== Leadership ==
General manager

- Chris Curtin, 2004–2005
- Russell Hampton, 2005–May 2006
- Lylle Breier, Fall 2006

Vice-president

- Debbie McClellan, c.2015–2019
- David Lightbody, 2019–present (senior vice-president)
- Leigh Slaughter, 2020–present

== Projects ==
=== Television series ===
Title	Creator(s)/ Showrunners	Year(s)	Network	Co-production with	Notes
Bear in the Big Blue House	Mitchell Kriegman	1997–2006	Playhouse Disney	Shadow Projects and Jim Henson Television	Co-production for the final episodes of Season 4
Breakfast with Bear	Rick Fernandes	2005–2006	Disney Channel		Spin-off of Bear in the Big Blue House
Muppets TV	Jérôme Francois-Sigrand	2006	TF1		
Studio DC: Almost Live	Matt Leuthe; Steve Millunzi	2008	Disney Channel	Disney Channels Worldwide and American English Entertainment	
Muppet Moments	Bill Barretta	2015	Disney Jr.	Disney Channels Worldwide and Soapbox Films	
The Muppets	Bill Prady; Bob Kushell	2015–2016	ABC	ABC Studios and Bill Prady Productions	
Muppet Babies	Mr. Warbuton; Matt Danner; Chris Hamilton	2018–2022	Disney Jr.	Disney Branded Television and Oddbot Animation	Preschool animated series
Muppets Now	Kirk Thatcher	2020	Disney+	Soapbox Films	
The Muppets Mayhem	Adam F. Goldberg; Jeff Yorkes; Bill Barreta	2023	Disney+	Disney Branded Television, Adam F. Goldberg Productions and ABC Signature	

=== Shorts ===
Title	Year(s)	Network	Notes
Statler and Waldorf: From the Balcony	2005–2008	Movies.com	
Muppet YouTube Videos	2008–present	YouTube	
The Muppets Kitchen with Cat Cora	2010	DisneyGo	
Muppisodes	2013–2014	Disney.com	
Disney Drive-On with the Muppets	2014	Disney Movies Anywhere	
Muppet Babies Show and Tell	2018	YouTube	Animated shorts
Big City Greens: Fozzie Bear Guest Stars!	2019	YouTube	Crosspromotion short for Big City Greens.
Amphibia: Kermit Reacts to Amphibia	2019	YouTube	Crosspromotion short for Amphibia.
Amphibia: Kermit The Frog (Consultant)	2019	YouTube	Crosspromotion short for Amphibia.
Muppet Babies Play Date	2019	YouTube	
The Muppets Mayhem: The Electric Mayhem Visit Spotify	2023	YouTube	Crosspromotion short for The Muppets Mayhem
Happy Birthday Jim Henson!	2024	YouTube	Collaboration with Sesame Workshop and The Jim Henson Company
The Muppet Show: Seth Rogen Chats With Kermit & Miss Piggy	2026	YouTube	Crosspromotion for The Muppet Show
FIFA World Cup 2026™ Final Halftime Show	2026	YouTube	Collaboration with Sesame Workshop
Rock ‘n’ Roller Coaster Starring The Muppets: Rizzo's Totally Authorized Tour	2026	YouTube	Crosspromotion short for Rock ‘n’ Roller Coaster Starring The Muppets.
Muppet Feed	2026	TikTok; Youtube Shorts; Instagram	First project of the studio for vertical short platforms
The Muppets: A Who Knew Carol	2026	YouTube	Collaboration with Walmart.

=== Television specials ===
#	Title	Release date	Network	Co-production(s)	Notes
1	A Muppets Christmas: Letters to Santa	December 17, 2008	NBC		
2	Lady Gaga and the Muppets Holiday Spectacular	November 28, 2013	ABC	Lincoln Square Productions	
3	Muppets Haunted Mansion	October 8, 2021	Disney+	Disney Branded Television and Soapbox Films	
4	The Muppet Show	February 4, 2026	Disney+ ABC	Disney Branded Television, 20th Television and Point Grey Pictures	Revival special of the original 1976 series.

=== Television films ===
#	Title	Release date	Network	Co-production(s)	Notes
1	The Muppets' Wizard of Oz	April 27, 2005	ABC	The Jim Henson Company, Fox Television Studios and Touchstone Television	

=== Theatrical films ===
#	Title	Release date	Director	Writer(s)	Producer(s)	Composer(s)	Co-production with	Budget	Gross	RT	MC
1	The Muppets	November 23, 2011	James Bobin	Jason Segel and Nicholas Stoller	David Hoberman and Todd Lieberman	Christophe Beck	Walt Disney Pictures; Mandeville Films	$45 million	$171.8 million	95%	75
2	Muppets Most Wanted	March 21, 2014	James Bobin	James Bobin and Nicholas Stoller	David Hoberman and Todd Lieberman	Christophe Beck	Walt Disney Pictures; Mandeville Films	$50 million	$80.4 million	80%	61

=== Theme park attractions ===
Title	Theme Park	Year(s)	Notes
Muppet*Vision 3D	Disney-MGM Studios; Disney's California Adventure	1991-2025 (Disney-MGM Studios/Disney's Hollywood Studios); 2001-2014 (Disney's California Adventure)	Formerly titled as Jim Henson's Muppet*Vision 3D.
Muppets Ahoy!	Disney Wonder cruise ship	2006	Stage show
Muppets Courtyard	Disney's Hollywood Studios	2016–2025	
PizzeRizzo	Disney's Hollywood Studios	2016–2025	Restaurant
Muppet Mobile Lab	Disney's California Adventure; Hong Kong Disneyland	2007-2019	Audio-Animatronic for Disney's "Living Character Initiative"
The Muppets Present...Great Moments in American History	Magic Kingdom	2016-2020	Live show
Rock 'n' Roller Coaster Starring The Muppets	Disney's Hollywood Studios	2026-present	Roller coaster

Soundtracks

Title	Genre	Notes
Seth McFarlane Sings The Muppets	Orchestra	Collaboration with Republic Records and Fuzzy Door Productions

=== Other credits ===
Title	Date	Production company	Notes
Good Luck Charlie	2013	It's a Laugh Productions	Episode: "Duncan Dream House"
The Game Awards	2018-present	The Game Awards Productions	
Big City Greens	2019	Disney Television Animation	Episode: "Hurty Tooth"
Amphibia	2020	Disney Television Animation	Episode: "Swamp and Sensibility"
The Masked Singer	2021	FOX Alternative Entertainment	Season 5, Episode 1
FIFA World Cup™ Final Halftime Show	2026	Global Citizen; Live Nation; Done + Dusted	Collaboration with Sesame Workshop
The Muppets Take The Marvel Universe	2026	Marvel Comics	Collaboration with Marvel Comics
Rock 'N' Roller Coaster Starring The Muppets — Play The Music!	2027	Marvel Comics	Collaboration with Marvel Comics

=== Stage productions ===
- Rob Lake Magic with Special Guests The Muppets at the Broadhurst Theatre
  20 previews and four regular performances, October 28 – November 16, 2025

== See also ==
- Sesame Workshop
