= Geneviève Brunet (actress) =

French actress (1930–2025)

Geneviève Yvonne Alberte Brunet (31 May 1930 – 31 July 2025) was a French actress of film, television and theatre. Her career spanned from 1954 until 2022.

Brunet was born on 31 May 1930, a twin to her sister Odile in Alençon, France, a commune in Normandy.

She studied at the National Academy of Dramatic Arts and appeared in such films as The City of Lost Children (1995), Lovers on a Tightrope (1960), and It Happened in Aden (1956). From 1978 to 1982, she was a character actress on the French children's television series, L'Île aux enfants. She also helped stage some of her sister's theatre productions.

Brunet died on 31 July 2025, at the age of 95. From 1955 to 1972, she was married to actor Georges Descrières, and they had two children.
