= Sacha Briquet =

French actor (1930–2010)

Sacha Briquet (1930–2010) was a French actor, born in Neuilly-sur-Seine.

== Biography ==
He notably played the character of Albert Travling in the children's television program L'Île aux enfants. He signed a book of memories, Comédien, pourquoi pas?, published by AJ in 1974.

== Selected filmography ==
- Demain nous divorçons (1951)
- Under the Paris Sky (1951) - (uncredited)
- Le clochard milliardaire (1951)
- Le divertissement (1952)
- La Tour de Nesle (1955) - Un assassin (uncredited)
- Pas de pitié pour les caves (1955) - Gégène
- L'éveil de l'amour (1955)
- Marie Antoinette Queen of France (1956) - (uncredited)
- Printemps à Paris (1957) - Le pickpocket
- Sénéchal the Magnificent (1957) - Le représentant en télévision
- Mademoiselle et son gang (1957) - Émile - le serveur (uncredited)
- First of May (1958) - Un inspecteur en civil (uncredited)
- Miss Pigalle (1958)
- Archimède le clochard (1959) - Jean-Loup, l'Anglais / English Guest
- L'increvable (1959) - Minor Role (uncredited)
- Witness in the City (1959) - Le client du strip-tease éméché (uncredited)
- The Enigma of the Folies-Bergere (1959) - (uncredited)
- La marraine de Charley (1959) - Jacques
- Arrêtez le massacre (1959)
- Match contre la mort (1959)
- Les Bonnes Femmes (1960) - Henri
- The Gigolo (1960) - L'homme du bar / The Man in the Bar
- Wise Guys (1961) - Henri, le fiancé
- Amelie or The Time to Love (1961) - Hubert
- The Seven Deadly Sins (1961) - Harry (segment "Avarice, L'")
- The Elusive Corporal (1962) - L'évadé grimé en vielle femme
- Landru (1963) - Le substitut / Assistant prosecutor
- Ophélia (1963) - Gravedigger
- Thank You, Natercia (1963) - Jacques
- Clémentine chérie (1964) - L'animateur à la cérémonie des Miss
- The World's Most Beautiful Swindlers (1964) - (segment "L'homme qui vendit la Tour Eiffel")
- The Troops of St. Tropez (1964) - Le marchand de vêtements sur le port de Saint-Tropez (uncredited)
- Male Companion (1964) - Le fondé de pouvoir
- I Killed Rasputin (1967) - Tamarine
- Benjamin (1968) - Celestin
- L'écume des jours (1968)
- Ne jouez pas avec les Martiens (1968) - Méry
- Le concierge (1973) - Le vendeur de meubles
- Les confidences érotiques d'un lit trop accueillant (1973) - Robert, l'ami de Charles
- La gueule de l'emploi (1974) - L'homme important
- Gross Paris (1974)
- Le polygame (1974) - L'inspecteur
- Le portrait de Dorian Gray (1977) - Hamlet
- Le paradis des riches (1978) - Le commerçant
- Les surdoués de la première compagnie (1981)
- Carmen de Godard (1983) - (uncredited)
- Ave Maria (1984) - Le juge
- La vengeance du serpent à plumes (1984, directed by Gérard Oury) (with Coluche and Josiane Balasko) - Le concierge de l'hôtel
- Suivez mon regard (1986) - Le boulanger
- Hôtel du Paradis (1987) - Georges
- Funny Boy (1987) - Norman
- Un week-end sur deux (1990) - Albert, le maître d'hôtel
- Eye of the Widow (1991) - Cardinal
- The Accompanist (1992) - Dignitary
- Le roi de Paris (1995) - Roquépine
- Pédale douce (1996) - Emilio
- Belle maman (1999) - Agent immobilier
- Monsieur Naphtali (1999) - Directeur maison de repos
- Ma femme s'appelle Maurice (2002) - Le concierge de Georges
- Les irréductibles (2006) - Le maire
- Nous trois (2010) - Le grand-père (final film role)

== See also ==
- L'Île aux enfants
