= Collette Sunderman =

American voice and casting director

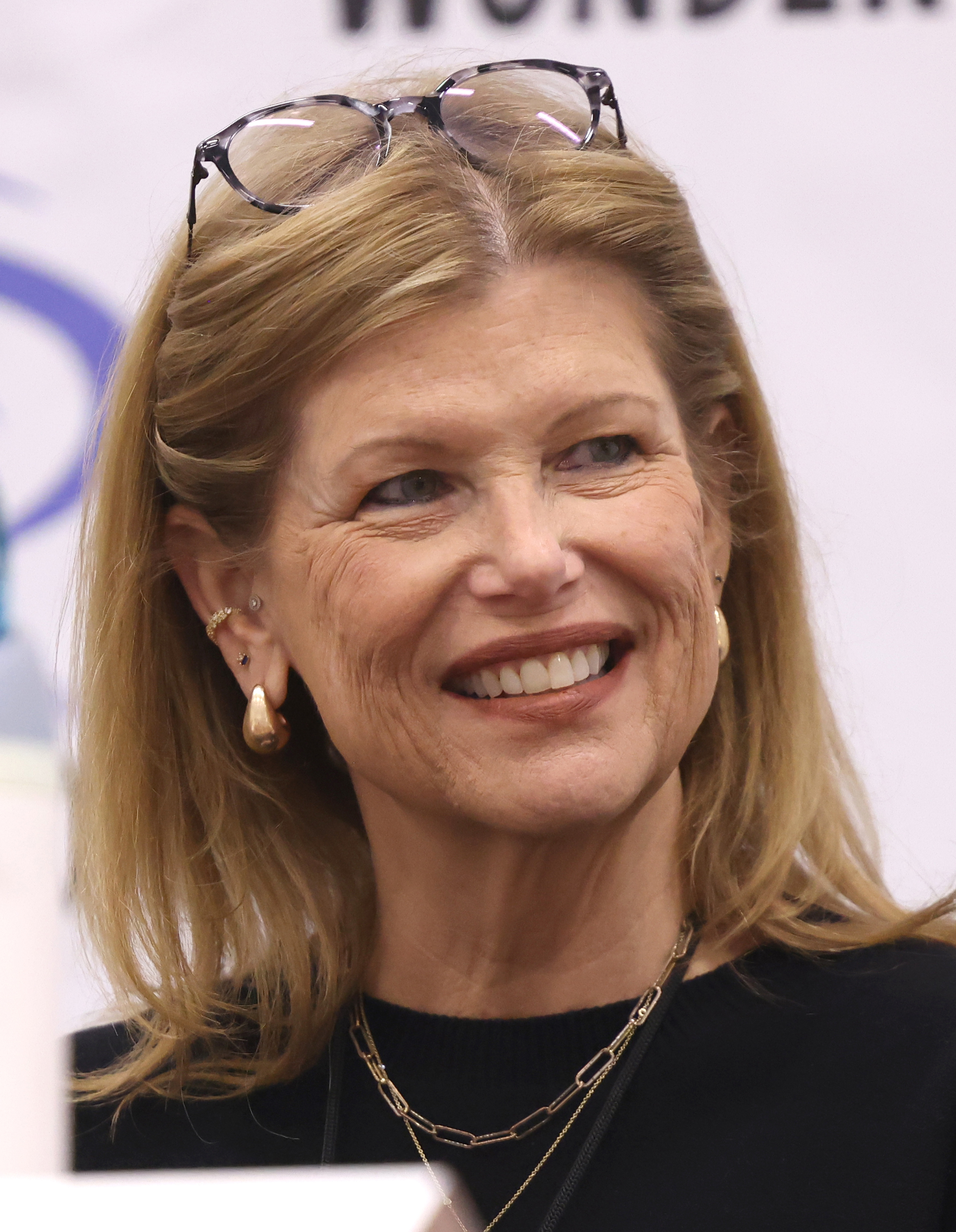
- Sunderman in 2025
- Born: Collette Marie Bennett; Sun Valley, Los Angeles, California, U.S.
- Occupations: Voice director; casting director
- Years active: 1990s–present
- Spouse: Nick Sunderman (m. 1979)
- Children: 4
- Relatives: Jeff Bennett (brother)

Collette Marie Sunderman (née Bennett) is an American director principally involved with voice and casting direction for animated television, film productions and video games.

Her credits include The Powerpuff Girls, seasons 1-4 of Samurai Jack, ¡Mucha Lucha!, What's New, Scooby-Doo?, Codename: Kids Next Door, Duck Dodgers, Foster's Home for Imaginary Friends, Camp Lazlo!, Chowder, Generator Rex, Scooby-Doo! Mystery Incorporated, New Looney Tunes, and Victor and Valentino.

== Early life ==
Bennett was born in Sun Valley, Los Angeles, California.

== Career ==
Sunderman began her career in animation in the early 1990s for Hanna-Barbera, where she worked as a talent coordinator.

Several years later, she did the casting and, on some occasion, co-directed with Kris Zimmerman on Dexter's Laboratory, The Real Adventures of Jonny Quest and Johnny Bravo. However, the first show she directed was the short film Kenny and the Chimp in 1998, four years later turned into Codename: Kids Next Door for which she was called upon to voice direct.

Sunderman regularly works for Warner Bros. Animation/Hanna Barbera and Cartoon Network Studios. She is also actively involved in the Scooby-Doo projects, having worked on both animated series and direct-to-video films featuring the most notable canine.
