= Lovers on a Tightrope =

1960 film directed by Jean-Charles Dudrumet

- Directed by: Jean-Charles Dudrumet
- Written by: Michel Lebrun (novel); Jean-Charles Dudrumet; Roland Laudenbach
- Produced by: Robert Ciriez
- Starring: Annie Girardot; François Périer; Gérard Buhr
- Cinematography: Pierre Guéguen
- Edited by: Janine Verneau
- Music by: Maurice Jarre
- Production company: Panda Films
- Distributed by: Compagnie Française de Distribution Cinématographique
- Release date: 6 April 1960
- Running time: 79 minutes
- Country: France
- Language: French

Lovers on a Tightrope (French: La corde raide) is a 1960 French drama film directed by Jean-Charles Dudrumet and starring Annie Girardot, François Périer and Gérard Buhr.

The film's sets were designed by the art director Olivier Girard.

== Synopsis ==
A wealthy Paris businessman suspects that his wife is having an affair with a garage mechanic, and hires a private detective to investigate them.

== Cast ==
- Annie Girardot as Cora
- François Périer as Daniel
- Geneviève Brunet as Isabelle
- Gérard Buhr as Henri
- Christine Caron as L'infirmière
- Marcelle Arnold as La standardiste
- Annie Andrel as La dame du vestaire
- Piella Sorano as Maria
- Hubert Deschamps as Carconi
- Pierre Moncorbier as Le détective
- Lucien Raimbourg as Le portier de l'hôpital
- Michel Seldow as L'homme aux lunettes
- Henri Virlojeux as Le garçon d'étage
- Léonce Corne as Le curé
- Roger Saget as Edouard
- Louis Bugette as Un gendarme
- Paul Bisciglia as Le mécano
- Christian Lude as Le journaliste
- Gérard Darrieu as Un gendarme
- Christian Brocard as Le pompiste
- Doudou Babet as Le veilleur de nuit
- Georges Descrières as Simon
- Henri Crémieux as Le médecin

== Bibliography ==
- Dayna Oscherwitz & MaryEllen Higgins. The A to Z of French Cinema. Scarecrow Press, 2009.
