= Muppets TV =

- Genre: Comedy
- Based on: The Muppets by Jim Henson
- Country of origin: France
- Original language: French
- No. of episodes: 10

Production
- Executive producer: Jérôme Francois-Sigrand
- Producer: Sébastien Cauet
- Editor: Benjamin Letellier
- Running time: 45 minutes
- Production company: The Muppets Studio

Original release
- Network: TF1
- Release: 29 October – 31 December 2006

Muppets TV is a French television series produced by Sébastien Cauet for The Muppets Studio, based on the characters from The Muppet Show created by Jim Henson, and broadcast between 29 October and 31 December 2006 on TF1.

== Synopsis ==
In this French version of The Muppet Show, Kermit receives a main guest on a television set. During the show, several other personalities appear in short sequences.

== French voices ==
- Sébastien Cauet as Kermit the Frog
- Franck Sportis as Miss Piggy
- Marc Duquenoy as Fozzie Bear, Gonzo, Clifford, Newsman
- Cartman as Scooter
- Miko as Animal
- Pierre Dourlens as Statler
- Jean-François Kopf as Waldorf

== Puppeteers ==
- Christophe Albertini
- Charlie Bazir
- Yves Brunier
- Regis Fassier
- Sandrine Furrer
- Erwan Courtioux
- Pascal Meunier
- Francoise Salmon
- Boris Scheigam: artistic director puppeteers
- Evelyne Scheigam
- Cyril Valade

== Development ==
The series sprung from a 2005 deal which French radio comedian/producer Sébastien Cauet and French network TF1 made with Disney. The actual puppets were sent to France, and Cauet supplied the voice of Kermit (using a blend of French Kermit Roger Carel's voice and Jim Henson's characterization). Other of Cauet's radio colleagues supplied character voices, while French puppeteers, led by Yves Brunier, supplied the actual puppetry.

The 15-minute pilot debuted over TF1 in November 2005, with French actor/humorist Franck Dubosc as the featured guest. Segments included a parody of the French TV series Mon Incroyable Fiancé (retitled Mon Incroyable Muppet) and Piggy, ever sensual, pursuing guest star Dubosc.

The full series aired Sundays at 5:30pm as a 45-minute block, and in 5-minute segments Monday through Friday, taken from the best sketches and bits. In contrast to The Muppet Show and more in keeping with Muppets Tonight, each episode featured two guest stars.

The series also made extensive use of the established Muppet cast. The primary cast went beyond Kermit, Miss Piggy, Fozzie Bear, Gonzo, and Statler and Waldorf and featured "classic" Muppets including Scooter, Rowlf, Dr. Bunsen Honeydew and Beaker, the full ensemble of Dr. Teeth and the Electric Mayhem, the Swedish Chef, Clifford and the Newsman, as well as Denise, a new character recycled from the Loni Dunne puppet, and several other Whatnots.

10 full 45-minute episodes were produced in 2006 for the first batch of shows. However due to station management changes and poor ratings, TF1 opted not to order a second set of Muppets TV episodes.

== List of episodes ==
1. Adriana Karembeu and Pascal Obispo
2. Elie Semoun and Bob Sinclar
3. Anggun and Michaël Youn
4. Liane Foly and David Douillet
5. Lara Fabian and Titoff
6. Florent Pagny and Florence Foresti
7. Franck Dubosc and Lorie
8. Laurent Voulzy and Patrick Bosso
9. Mimie Mathy, Stéphane Rousseau, Nikos Aliagas, Philippe Lelièvre and Richard Cross
10. Sébastien Cauet, Alexandra Rosenfeld, M. Pokora and Tina Arena

== Comments ==
- In this French version, Miss Piggy is referred to as Miss Peggy. The French confusing the first name Peggy with that of Piggy, diminutive of Pig (Cochon in English) which means here "little slut" or Piggy the slut in "The Muppet Show".
- For lack of audience, only ten episodes were broadcast.
