= 5, Rue Sésame =

French children's television series

- Created by: Based on a concept by Joan Ganz Cooney, with Jim Henson
- Starring: the same characters
- Country of origin: France
- No. of seasons: 2
- No. of episodes: 150

Production
- Running time: 26 minutes per episode
- Production company: Sesame Workshop

Original release
- Network: France 5
- Release: 22 October 2005 – 21 December 2007

5, Rue Sésame is a French-language children's television series based on the popular American children's show Sesame Street, aired by France 5. This series is the second Sesame Workshop co-production for France, the first being 1, rue Sésame.

Seventy-five 26-minute-long episodes were created for the two seasons, directed by François Basset and Jul Mallard. The series is produced for France 5 by Expand-Drama with Sesame Workshop. The executive producer of the series is Georges Campana. It was made for children between the ages of 3 and 6 years old. The show debuted airing daily, Sunday to Friday at 6:30 am, and Saturdays at 7:00 am and 12:30 pm.

== Characters ==
For the most part, characters in 5, Rue Sésame are unique to the series.

=== Muppets ===
- Nac (performed by Régis Fassier) – Gentle, positive and generous, he is a 2.2-meter (7.2 ft) monster. Nac is considered to be the program's "mascot".
- Griotte (performed by Evelyne Scheigam) – A lavender Anything Muppet girl. She is handicapped but still participates in all the activities on the street. Griotte's name can be literally translated as Morello cherry. She is similar in design to Roxie Marie from Sesame Street.
- Yoyo (performed by Yves Brunier) – He is a fearful, hyperemotional, and very anxious monster. Yoyo has a heart of gold and his qualities are very endearing. He is a live-hand variation of Narf from Sesame Street.
- Olive (performed by Charlie Bazire) – A green furry monster. Naughty, fearless, full of giggles and grins: Olive is all that at once! She has a similar design to those of Karina the Ballerina and Karli from Sesame Street.
- Elmo (performed by Christophe Albertini) – Three-and-a-half years old, he is the youngest character in the series. Originally from the American version.
- Georges (performed by Richard Sandra) – Georges is a penguin who arrived on Rue Sésame inside an ice cube. A likeable character, he made friends with the rest of the Rue's residents.

=== Humans ===
- Titouan (portrayed by Florent Moriniere) – A retired man, he is considered to be a "true modern dad".
- Baya (portrayed by Myriam Loucif) – A baker. Her good mood and her generosity give the street a lot of confidence.
- Juliette (portrayed by Chloe Stefanni) – This young student works as a newsstand manager on the street.

== Season 1 ==
The show follows the original Sesame Street format, in which the extended storyline (known as "a Street scene") continues throughout the show, in four parts.

Twenty songs are featured in this season, ten of which are exclusive to the show. The music is composed by Madeleine Going with lyrics by D’Alexandra Pic.

Each episode includes a 1:30 segment featuring French Sign Language, exercise segments around the country, and Le monde de Nac, which uses the international films from the American Global Grover series. La lettre du jour (Letter of the Day) with Cookie Monster and Prairie Dawn is dubbed and shown on 5, Rue Sésame, as well as Le chiffre du jour (Number of the Day), with Comte von Compte (Count von Count).
