= Christophe Izard =

French television producer (1937–2022)

- Born: 30 May 1937; 7th arrondissement of Paris, France
- Died: 31 July 2022 (aged 85); Île-de-France, France
- Occupation: Television producer
- Notable work: L'île aux Enfants; Albert the Fifth Musketeer

Christophe Izard (30 May 1937 – 31 July 2022) was a French television producer.

He is best known as a creator of children's programmes for TF1 between 1974 and 1987, where he launched the character Casimir in the children's series L'Île aux enfants, the French version of Sesame Street by Children's Television Workshop, whose French pilot was directed by David Niles (formerly Captain Video) for the COFCI company.

He then became director of the youth department at France 2.

He has written numerous animated series for children, including Albert the Fifth Musketeer.

Izard died on 31 July 2022 in Achères-la-Forêt.

== Family ==
Christophe Izard is the son of politician and lawyer Georges Izard and his wife Catherine Daniélou, and the grandson of politician and writer Charles Daniélou and Madeleine Daniélou (née Madelein Clamorgan), founder of the schools of the same name, and the nephew of Cardinal Jean Daniélou and Indianist Alain Daniélou.

== Select filmography ==
- L'île aux Enfants
- Albert the Fifth Musketeer
