= Patrick Bricard =

French actor (1940–2019)

- Born: 26 April 1940; Caen, France
- Died: 26 January 2019 (aged 78)
- Occupation: Actor
- Years active: 1964–2019
- Children: Benjamin, Thomas

Patrick Bricard (26 April 1940 – 26 January 2019) was a French actor and director.

== Biography ==
Bricard appeared in numerous movies and television shows. In 1964, he played a small role in the film The Umbrellas of Cherbourg. In 1968, Bricard played the role of Marcel in the TV movie L'Homme du Picardie. Before he reached his break-out, Bricard had another small role in the film Le Distrait. He achieved fame in the television series L'Île aux enfants (1974-1982). Other notable television appearances include Le Village dans les nuages (1982-1986) and La Dernière Séance.

After 1986, Bricard mainly devoted himself to theatre, directing plays such as Poil de carotte, The Little Prince, Letters from My Windmill, Scapin the Schemer, The Miser, and Le Médecin malgré lui.

Bricard died on 26 January 2019.
