= Yves Brunier =

French puppeteer (1941–2026)

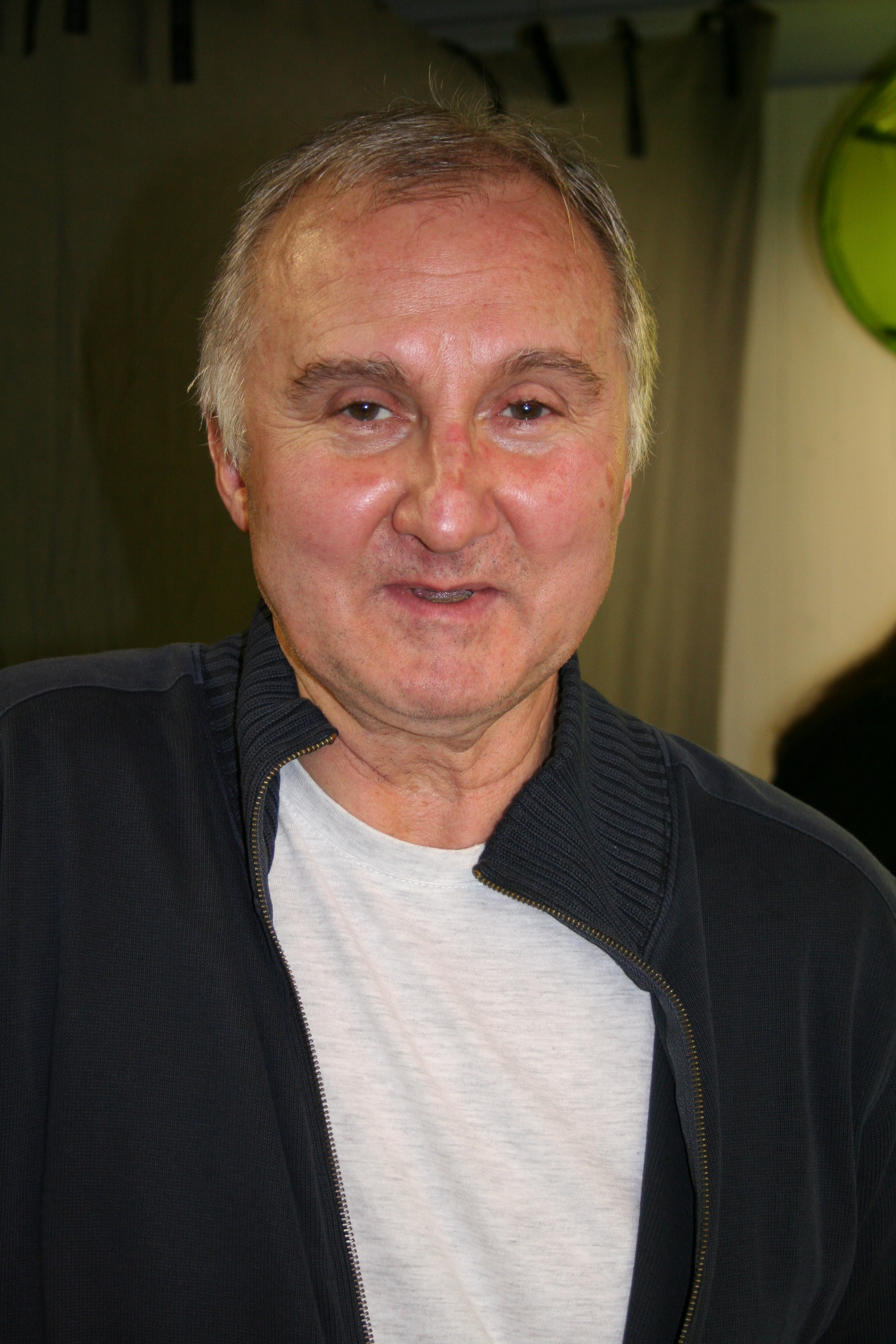
Yves Brunier, November 2006.

Yves Brunier (19 March 1941 – 4 September 2026) was a French puppeteer. He is best known for his character, Casimir, an orange colored dinosaur who appears on French Children's TV. He played Chelli in Sacatruc, the French version of Big Bag. Brunier later went to perform on 5, Rue Sésame as Yoyo. He also performed on the Muppets TV pilot.

Brunier died on 4 September 2026, at the age of 85.

== History ==
Yves Brunier was born in Lyon on March 19, 1941.

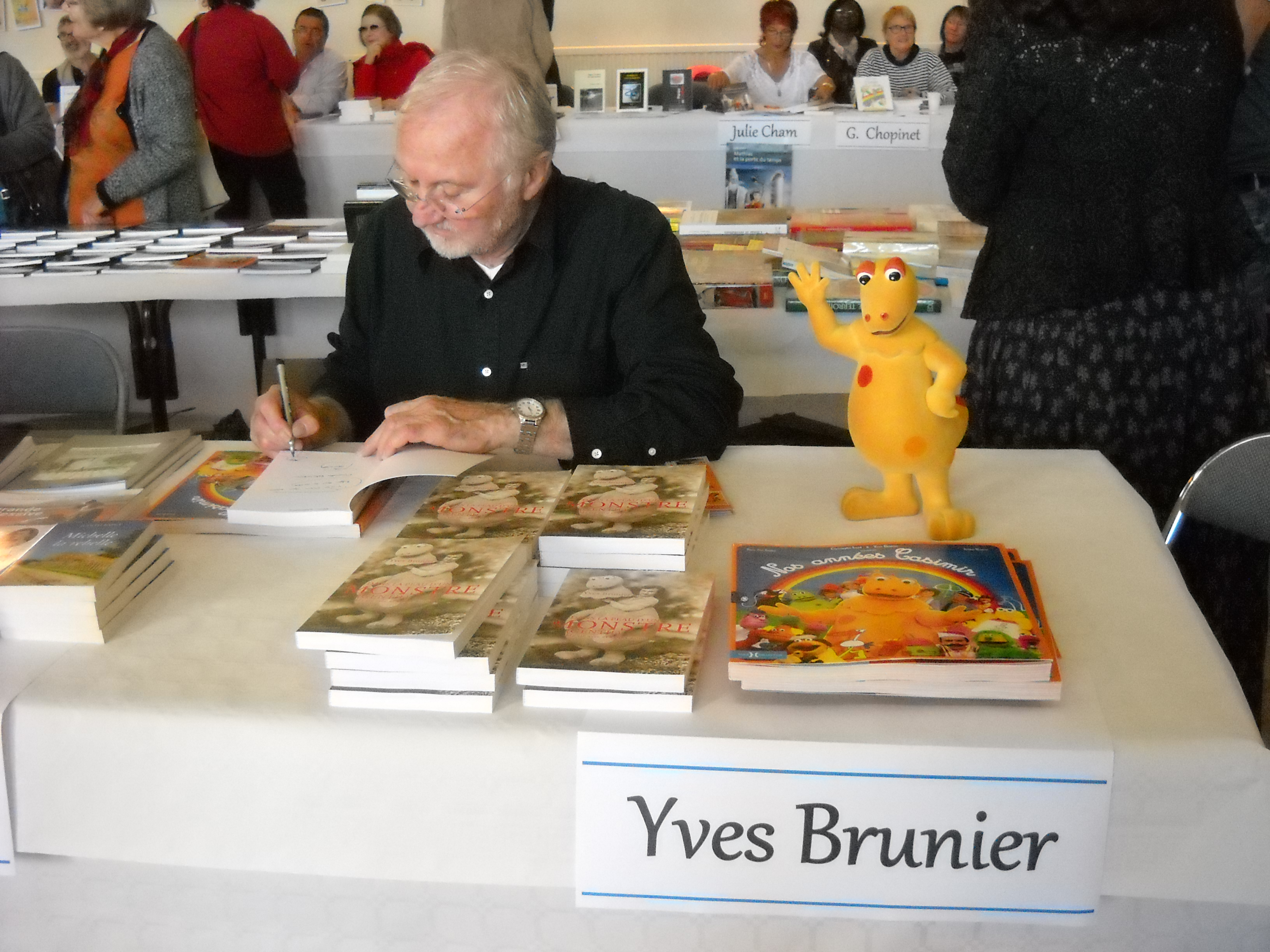
Yves Brunier in 2017

== See also ==
- L'Île aux enfants
