= Albert the Fifth Musketeer =

Animated television series

- Also known as: Albert le 5ème mousquetaire
- Genre: Adventure; Comedy
- Created by: Christophe Izard
- Written by: Gilles Adrien; Olivier Montegut; Christophe Izard
- Directed by: Alain Sion
- Voices of: Jimmy Hibbert; Susan Sheridan; Andy Turvey; Christian Rodska; Joanna Wheeler; Shireen Shah; Mike Drew; Dick Cadbury; Jayne Lloyd
- Composer: Kick Production
- Countries of origin: France; Germany; United Kingdom; Canada
- Original languages: English; French; German
- No. of episodes: 26

Production
- Executive producers: Christophe Izard; Theresa Plummer-Andrews
- Producers: Micheline Charest; Christian Davin; Peter Hille
- Production companies: France Animation; CINAR Films; Ravensburger Film + TV; BBC Children's International

Original release
- Network: Children's BBC (UK); Canal+ (France); YTV (Canada)
- Release: March 16 – July 2, 1994

Albert the Fifth Musketeer is an animated television series based on the 1844 novel The Three Musketeers by Alexandre Dumas. It was a co-production between France Animation and CINAR Films for Ravensburger and BBC Children's International, in association with France 3, Canal+ and Videal. Produced in 1993, it was broadcast from 16 March to 2 July 1994.

== Plot ==
The show centers around the antics of Albert (French pronunciation: [albɛʁ] AL-bair) de Parmagnan, a new member of the Musketeers (the series takes place after the Siege of La Rochelle, and therefore after D'Artagnan has become a musketeer, but before Milady de Winter's death). While the other four musketeers are portrayed as bumbling and incompetent, Albert is quick-witted and clever, creating many inventions to get the others out of trouble.

He and the other Musketeers have adventures as they fight with the guards of Cardinal Richelieu and attempt to thwart his plans to take over France.

== Cast ==
The characters, apart from Albert (voiced by Jimmy Hibbert), are all generally broad stereotypes of their traditional portrayals in the original Musketeers book and subsequent film adaptations:

- D'Artagnan (voiced by Andy Turvey) is a brash and impulsive self-declared leader of the Musketeers.
- Athos (voiced by Jimmy Hibbert) rarely says anything, but tends to do everything backwards, including riding his horse.
- Porthos (voiced by Christian Rodska) is large and fat, and is always thinking of his stomach.
- Aramis (voiced by Mike Drew) is flirtatious and feminine, and often lapses into poetry.
- M. de Tréville (voiced by Christian Rodska) is the captain of the King's Musketeers.
- King Louis XIII (voiced by Jimmy Hibbert) is the ruler of France and commissioner of the Musketeers. Childish and moronic, he is easily duped by Richelieu.
- Anne of Austria (voiced by Shireen Shah) is the King's wife. Beautiful, but ditsy, she talks in a slight lispy French tone. She often confides privately in Albert with instructions.
- Cardinal Richelieu (voiced by Mike Drew): A Prime Minister of France, he seeks to undermine the King's authority at every turn and sends his guards to fight off the meddling Musketeers who threaten to disrupt his plans.
- M'Lady (voiced by Susan Sheridan) is Richelieu's cunning female assistant. She has a tattoo of a fleur de lis on her shoulder that turns into a quacking duck.
- The Duke of Buckingham (voiced by Dick Cadbury) is the love-crazed suitor of Queen Anne.

== Episodes ==
1. The King's New Shoes
2. Her Majesty's Gorilla
3. The Gold Coach
4. The King's Complex
5. Food for a King
6. The Identikit Picture
7. Anatole's Treasure
8. Patchouli for the Queen
9. The King of Thieves
10. The Spy
11. The Cocoa Mission
12. The Queen's Nanny
13. Her Majesty's Garden
14. Wig Business
15. The King's Jester
16. The Duke's Tunes
17. The Count of Quicostro
18. The Return of the Queen Mother
19. The Pillow Caper
20. The Musketeer Day
21. Ghost You Said?
22. The Ambassador
23. The Queen's Tortoises
24. Mauricette Crouton
25. Strawberries for the King
26. A Dukelike Imposter
