= Sébastien Cauet =

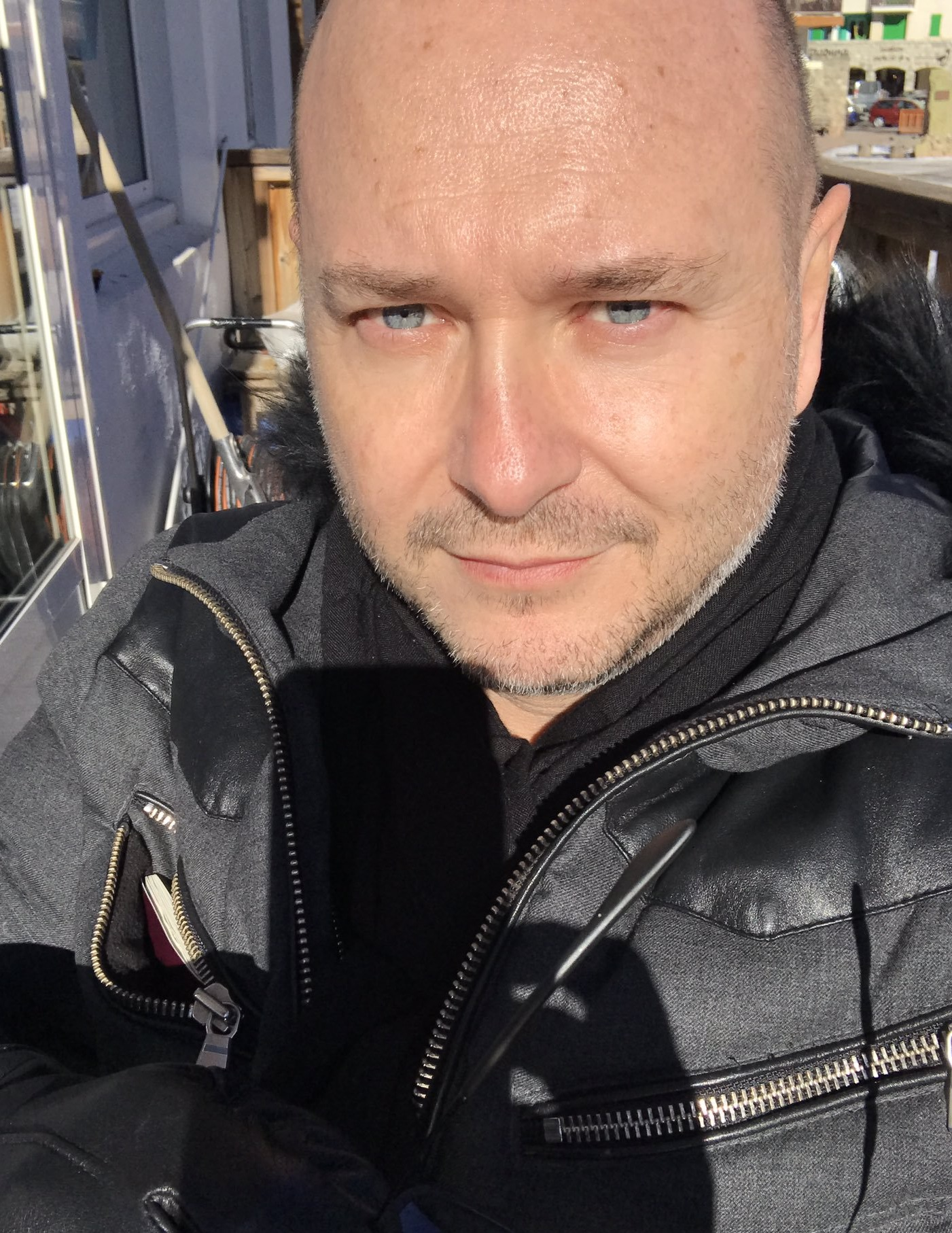
Cauet in 2016

Sébastien Jean Maurice Cauet (French pronunciation: [sebastjɛ̃ ʒɑ̃ mɔʁis ko.ɛ]; born 28 April 1972), better known by the mononym Cauet, is a well-known French radio and TV host, comedian, imitator, singer, DJ and record producer. He has worked at various times as host on TF1, Europe 2, Fun Radio, Skyrock, Virgin Radio and NRJ. He was born in Saint-Quentin.

He is the founder and president of Cauet Groupe (renamed Be Aware Groupe) since 2003. Important shows hosted by Cauet on French television include CaueTivi (2003–2004), La Méthode Cauet (2003–2008), La Cauetidienne (2008), Ça va s'Cauet (2010) and Bienvenue chez Cauet (2011–2013). He is also radio host of radio shows Le morning de Cauet (2001–2009) and C'Cauet (2010 until present). He also did French language voiceover for various films. Véronique Richebois published a biography on Cauet titled Sébastien Cauet: Le côté obscur de la farce.

== Filmography ==
- 2003: School of Rock : Dewey Finn (french dub)
- 2004: Garfield: The Movie : Garfield (french dub)
- 2006: Garfield 2: A Tale of Two Kitties : Garfield (french dub)
- 2006 : Les Aristos : Gilbert Convert
- 2009: Muppets TV (tv series): Kermit the Frog (voice)
