= 1, rue Sésame =

French Children's Television Series

- Genre: Children's television series
- Created by: Based on a concept by Joan Ganz Cooney, with Jim Henson
- Country of origin: France
- No. of episodes: 82

Production
- Running time: 50 minutes

Original release
- Network: TF1
- Release: 4 January 1978 – 24 June 1982

1, rue Sésame (translates to: 1 Sesame Street) is a French children's television series based on the popular American children's program Sesame Street. The show first aired on 4 January 1978, at 6:00 a.m. on TF1. Its musical director was Roger Elcourt, composer Jean Morlier. The series was executive produced by Michel Berthier from TF1 and Lutrelle Horne from CTW. The show ran for a total of 82 episodes and ceased production in June 1982.

== Season 1 (1978–1979) ==
The 1st season featured Toccata and Mordicus, as well as a cast of four adults (Roger, Odile, Clémence and Maxime) and two children, Fabienne and Rodrigue. Each of the characters (except for Odile who had a leitmotif and the two aforementioned children) had their own signature song, along with two duets (by Toccata/Mordicus and Roger/Clémence) and an occasional closing "street anthem" sung by the entire cast. These songs would be randomly performed in various episodes.

== Season 2 (1979–1980) ==
By the second season Clémence, Maxime, Fabienne and Rodrigue were dropped from the show for the 2nd season, and were replaced with Dominé (Maxime's father), Catherine, and Marie-Lise. Vendredi, Marie-Lise's boyfriend also made occasional appearances during 1979, as both characters only appeared for this season. Additionally, a new Muppet character, Trepido the snail (originally named Subito) joins the cast. It's also at this point where Roger, Dominé, and Maxime form a singing group, "The Sésame Trio". Additionally, the episode plots became weekly stories although this practice would also last for this season only.

== Season 3 (1980–1981) ==
Starting with the 3rd season in fall 1980, the show underwent a number of changes, following in a new format. The show's opening and closing title sequence with Toccata, Mordicus, and the children was replaced with a set of generic, decorative stills for the opening credits. The end credits were accompanied with children's drawings, with two sets being used interchangeably between the final two seasons. The segments were now shown grouped together in an orderly fashion, under their own title: usually, a street scene would be shown first (although only one or two would be included from this point forward), followed by the Muppet segments ("Au théâtre Sésame") and the cartoons ("Le jardin des Petits"). Afterwards, a new set of segments, known as "Des yeux pour voir", would either feature Toccata or Mordicus or both characters venturing outside of their normal terrain and engaging in various activities. These segments would be filmed on-location instead of taped, and the duo were rarely accompanied by the other street characters, usually Roger and Trepido. Sometimes, an additional filmed segment would appear as a short "Gag", while "Des yeux pour voir" and the street scenes would be switched occasionally.

Since these segments were now named, they would usually be preceded by a short introductory animated title sequence, except for "Au théâtre Sésame", which would open with a short live-action sequence featuring a pop-card of Bert and Ernie.

== Season 4 (1981–1982) ==
By the 4th and final season Odile stopped appearing regularly, and a new member, Augustine, joined the cast. The show eventually ended on June 24, 1982, with the last episode, "Voyage aux Amériques". In the episode, everyone is invited by Mordicus's unseen American cousin, Johnny Mordicus (not Oscar the Grouch) on vacation to visit Sesame Street in the USA. Ironically, a rumor circulated that the series' cancellation was influenced by the then-new presidency of François Mitterrand, since the show's American roots clashed against Mitterrand's anti-Americanism views.

== History ==
The series is occasionally called Bonjour Sésame, or la Rue Sésame. In October 2005, a new series by Sesame Workshop was launched, called 5, Rue Sésame.

== Characters ==
- Toccata, a white feathered bird, almost a goose-hawk-ostrich-like hybrid bird (voiced and puppeteered by Lucien Morisse)
- Mordicus, a furless grouch (voiced and puppeteered by Georges Mosca)
- Trepido, a pink snail (voiced and puppeteered by Catherine Coste)
- Ernest et Bart (Ernie and Bert)
- Clémence (Monique Tarbes)
- Odile (Edith Garnier)
- Roger (Roger Elcourt)
- Maxime (Maxime Arcos)
- Dominé (René Lafleur)
- Children Fabienne (Fabienne Dauvin) and Rodrigue (Rodrigue Mallet)
