= Eric Shaw (screenwriter) =

American television writer

- Born: Jericho, New York, U.S.
- Occupation: Television writer
- Writing career
- Years active: 1996–present

Eric Shaw is an American television writer whose credits include Nickelodeon's SpongeBob SquarePants. Originally from Jericho, New York, he attended Jericho High School and graduated from Columbia University. He has been an animation writer since 2003 and has also written for Skunk Fu!, Krypto the Superdog, Sid the Science Kid, My Friends Tigger & Pooh and other animated shows. He is known for writing on SpongeBob SquarePants seasons five and six. As a staff writer, Shaw had written 10 SpongeBob episodes. In 2007, Shaw served as the President of the International Jury at the Cartoons on the Bay Animation Festival in Salerno, Italy. Shaw was head writer on the PBS animated series WordGirl, starring Tom Kenny, Maria Bamford, Patton Oswalt, and Jeffrey Tambor, for the fifth season (26 episodes). He worked from Soup2Nuts' Watertown, Massachusetts studio. On June 14, 2013, he won an Emmy Award for Outstanding Writing in Animation at the 40th Annual Creative Arts Daytime Emmy Awards.

== SpongeBob episodes ==
- "Krabs a la Mode"
- "To Love a Patty"
- "The Krusty Sponge"
- "The Krusty Plate"
- "Blackened Sponge"
- "Mermaid Man vs. SpongeBob"
- "The Battle of Bikini Bottom"
- "Stanley S. SquarePants"
- "Krabby Road"
- "Patty Caper"
