= Mr. Warburton =

American animator and television producer

- Born: Thomas Edward Warburton; July 23, 1968 (age 58); Philadelphia, Pennsylvania, U.S.
- Education: Kutztown University
- Occupations: Animator, producer, screenwriter, character designer
- Years active: 1990–present

Thomas Edward "Tom" Warburton (born July 23, 1968), better known as Mr. Warburton, is an American animator, producer, screenwriter, and character designer. He is best known for creating the animated television series Codename: Kids Next Door. He also created the animated short Kenny and the Chimp. Prior to that, he served as production designer on the first season of Beavis and Butt-Head and was the lead character designer for the animated series Pepper Ann. He is also the author of the book A Thousand Times No. Since moving to Los Angeles in 2009, he has worked at Disney Television Animation serving as creative director on Fish Hooks, co-executive producer on The 7D and executive producer on Muppet Babies.

== Early life ==
Warburton was born in Philadelphia, the son of Charles Warburton Jr. and Vesna (née Krajacic), and grew up in Ambler. He attended Kutztown University, where he studied graphic design.

== Work ==
=== Buzzco Associates ===
After graduating from Kutztown University, Mr. Warburton moved to New York City to work at Buzzco Associates. The studio, run by NYC animation veterans Vincent Cafarelli and Candy Kugel, primarily took on commercial work to help fund their own independent films like the award-winning short A Warm Reception in LA. Warburton learned the basics of animation production from the ground up and got to meet many people in the industry that he remains friends with today.

=== Nickelodeon's Doug ===
After working at Buzzco Associates, Warburton went to Jumbo Pictures to work as an assistant layout artist on the first season of Nickelodeon's new series Doug. The show premiered alongside Rugrats and The Ren & Stimpy Show, which ushered in a new creator-driven approach to cartoon-making. Warburton also provided assistant animation to the end credit sequence for the show.

=== J.J. Sedelmaier Productions ===
Originally signing on as JJSP's first staff artist in 1992, Warburton spent five years working as an animator on dozens of commercials for clients like Levi's, Converse, Slim Jim and 7 Up. He also animated, designed, and directed on Saturday Night Live's TV Funhouse, directed new episodes of Schoolhouse Rock! (including the award-winning "The Tale of Mr. Morton"), and served as production designer on the first season of MTV's groundbreaking and controversial series Beavis and Butt-Head. While working on 7 Up commercials at the studio, Mr. Warburton met Fido Dido creator Sue Rose and the two found that their similar art styles might work well together in the future.

=== Pepper Ann ===
While at JJSP, Warburton did freelance work helping Sue Rose design characters for a series about a quirky and imaginative girl named Pepper Ann. The show was initially in development at Nickelodeon, but was later picked up to series by Disney Television Animation. Even though the production was based in Los Angeles, Warburton remained in NYC, working as lead character designer and faxing his drawings at night. The series ran for four seasons on Disney's One Saturday Morning and One Too blocks, ending its run on November 30, 2001 through syndication on the Disney Channel, with Warburton doing designs for the series from 1995 until 1999. Eventually, Warburton left JJSP to work solely on Pepper Ann and to develop his own projects.

=== Work at Cartoon Network ===
==== Kenny and the Chimp and Codename: Kids Next Door ====
Kenny and the Chimp was an unproduced animated series planned by Warburton. It was about an unlucky boy named Kenny who was constantly accompanied by an unintelligent chimpanzee named Chimpy, who would regularly create trouble for him in the various situations they experienced. Produced by Hanna-Barbera, the episode "Diseasy Does It" was the only one made. Its alternative title was "Chimp-N-Pox". Warburton also provided the voice for the chef in that short. There is also another episode called "Got Your Nose", and it was about to also be produced, but never released. After realizing that Cartoon Network was not going to make Kenny and the Chimp into a series, Warburton began developing the recurring characters, the Kids Next Door, a group of children who would often get Kenny into trouble, into a series. Instead of just being five troublemakers, the five kids became a "multi-ethnic team of experts battling against evil adult super villains bent on raising the drinking age of soda up to 13 and making summer school year round".

Cartoon Network commissioned a pilot, and Warburton temporarily moved to Los Angeles to make the short at the newly opened Cartoon Network Studios in Burbank. The story involved the KND's plot to stop the local swimming pool's seemingly endless adult swim guarded over by lifeguards Mr. Wink and Mr. Fibb (characters loosely based on Mr. Wint and Mr. Kidd from the 1971 James Bond movie Diamonds Are Forever). In addition, the character Professor XXXL, who was featured in "Diseasy Does It", became a recurring character in Kids Next Door. Kenny and Chimpy both make a brief cameo in the pilot episode of Codename: Kids Next Door, "No P in the Ool".

==== Sheep in the Big City ====
Mo Willems was starting the second season of his Cartoon Network series Sheep in the Big City and asked Warburton to come aboard as a director at NYC-based Curious Pictures. The two found they worked well together, each feeding off each other's similar and differing talents. Sheep's second season proved to be its last and the series was canceled. This coincided with Codename: Kids Next Door winning Cartoon Network's 2001 Big Pick Weekend and being greenlit to series.

=== 1000 Times No ===
After finishing Kids Next Door, Warburton pitched his first children's book to Laura Geringer Books, an imprint of HarperCollins. 1000 Times No was released on April 28, 2009 to positive reviews. An animated version was made for Nickelodeon's Nick Jr. Channel at Curious Pictures.

=== Work in Los Angeles ===
==== Fish Hooks ====
In 2010, Warburton moved with his wife and two children to Los Angeles. Shortly afterwards, he was hired as creative director on the Disney Channel series Fish Hooks, created by Noah Z. Jones and executive produced by fellow Cartoon Network alum Maxwell Atoms. Three seasons were produced before coming to an end.

==== The 7D ====
After Fish Hooks, a good portion of the staff rolled on to the Disney XD series The 7D, a comedic take on the Seven Dwarfs from Disney's first feature film Snow White and the Seven Dwarfs. With character designs by Noah Z. Jones and executive-produced by Tom Ruegger (Tiny Toon Adventures, The Plucky Duck Show, Animaniacs, Freakazoid!, Pinky and the Brain, and Pinky, Elmyra & the Brain), Warburton was initially brought on as creative director but was soon promoted to co-executive producer. The show received strong ratings upon its premiere, but the show was canceled after its second season.

==== Muppet Babies ====
While finishing post-production on The 7D, Warburton was tapped to develop and executive produce a CG reboot of the 1980s hit animated show Muppet Babies. The series aired on Disney Jr. from March 23, 2018, to February 18, 2022.

Muppet Babies went on for three seasons (72 half hours/143 episodes), was nominated for many awards and won 3 Emmys: 2019 Outstanding Performer in a Preschool Animated Program: Ben Diskin as Gonzo and Rizzo; 2020 Outstanding Performer in a Preschool Animated Program": Matt Danner as Kermit/Rowlf/Mr. Waldorf/Beaker and Chef and 2022 Outstanding Writing for a Preschool Animated Program. The show also won a Sentinel award for the episode Rowlf Gets The Blues.

==== Naked Mole Rat Gets Dressed: The Underground Rock Experience ====
While finishing Muppet Babies, Mr. Warburton reunited with his Sheep in the Big City partner Mo Willems to write and executive-produce Naked Mole Rat Gets Dressed: The Underground Rock Experience, an hour-long CG animated film based on Mr. Willems' stage musical Naked Mole Rat Gets Dressed: The Rock Experience (based on his best-selling book of similar name). The film was produced at Oddbot Studios for Max (formerly HBO Max) and premiered to strong reviews. However, it was one of the few titles removed from the service following its rebranding to Max.

==== Kindergarten: The Musical ====
With Muppet Babies and NMR winding down, Mr. Warburton was tapped to help develop and executive produce the pilot for a new Disney Jr. show created by musicians Michelle Lewis and Charlton Pettus, along with musical partners Dan Petty and Kay Hanley. Kindergarten: The Musical was greenlit to a full series in March 2022 for 25 half-hours/50 episodes). It began airing on September 3, 2024.

== Awards and nominations ==
Year	Award	Category	Work / nominee	Result
2005	Ottawa International Animation Festival	Best Television Series for Children	Codename: Kids Next Door	Won
2006	Ottawa International Animation Festival	Best Television Series for Children	Codename: Kids Next Door	Won
2007	Cartoons on the Bay	Action-adventure TV series	Codename: Kids Next Door	Nominated
2019	Daytime Emmy	Outstanding Preschool Children's Animated Series	Muppet Babies (shared)	Nominated
2020	Daytime Emmy	Outstanding Short Format Children's Program	Muppets Babies "Play date" (shared)	Nominated
