= Matt Danner =

American actor

- Occupations: Director; screenwriter; animator; storyboard artist; producer; voice actor
- Years active: 1997–present

Matt Danner is an American animator, screenwriter, storyboard artist, director, producer and voice actor. His credits include work on The Ripping Friends, ¡Mucha Lucha!, The Looney Tunes Show, Xiaolin Showdown, Team Hot Wheels, Dan Vs., Gravity Falls, Wander Over Yonder, Coconut Fred's Fruit Salad Island, Legend of the Three Caballeros and the 2018 reboot of Muppet Babies for which he provides the voice of Kermit.

== Early life ==
Danner's initial memory of comedy and cartoon characters was of Kermit the Frog, who he thought was his friend and was talking directly to him.

== Career ==
Danner began his animation career while still in high school.

In 2004, Danner was nominated for an Annie Award for his character design work on Xiaolin Showdown, the animated series that aired on Kids' WB.

Danner would create animated pilots for Cartoon Network, such as Bumble Braynes and Le Door, the latter for The Cartoonstitute.

In 2018, Danner served as the supervising director on the CG-animated Muppet Babies series, in addition to writing episodes. Danner also supplied the voice of Kermit, Rowlf, Mr. Waldorf, Beaker and Chef. He also directed the animated Disney+ series Legend of the Three Caballeros.

In 2020, Danner won an Emmy Award for Outstanding Performer in a Preschool Animated Program for playing Kermit, Rowlf, Mr. Waldorf, Beaker and Chef on Muppet Babies.

In 2022, Danner directed the animated film Night at the Museum: Kahmunrah Rises Again.

In 2025, Danner directed the animated film Diary of a Wimpy Kid: The Last Straw.

In 2026, Danner directed the animated film Diary of a Wimpy Kid Christmas: The Getaway.
