= Social life =

Social life may refer to:

- an individual's interpersonal relationships with people within their immediate surroundings or general public.
- Social relation (sociology)
- Social Life, an album by Koufax
- "Social Life", a song by Koufax off the eponymous album Social Life
- Social Life, a magazine about social life in the Hamptons

== See also ==
- Personal Life (disambiguation)
- Private Lives (disambiguation)
- Private life (disambiguation)
- Public life (disambiguation)
- Social (disambiguation)
- Lives (disambiguation)
- Life (disambiguation)
