= Lively =

Lively may refer to:

== Places ==
- Lively, Missouri, United States, an unincorporated community
- Lively, Texas, an unincorporated community
- Lively, Virginia, United States, an unincorporated community
- Lively, West Virginia, United States, an unincorporated community
- Lively, Ontario, Canada
- Lively Island, Falkland Islands
- Lively Point, Renaud Island, Antarctica

== Ships ==
- HMS Lively, the name of several ships of the Royal Navy
- Lively-class frigate, a Royal Navy class of sailing ship
- USS Active (1888), a tug renamed Lively in 1918
- Lively (HBC vessel), operated by the HBC from 1822 to 1824, see Hudson's Bay Company vessels

== Technology ==
- Lively (company), a connected health technology company and cellular service provider
- Live.ly, a live-streaming service owned by Musical.ly Inc., now TikTok
- Google Lively, a web-based virtual environment
- Lively Kernel, an open source web programming environment

== Other uses ==
- Lively (surname), a list of people
- Lively (album), an album by American band Arrogance
- Lively Technical Center, a public technical training school in Tallahassee, Florida

== See also ==
- Live (disambiguation)
- Living (disambiguation)
