= Alive =

Alive most often refers to the state of having life.

Alive may also refer to:

== Books, comics and periodicals ==
- Alive (novel), 2015, by Scott Sigler
- Alive: The Final Evolution, a 2003 shonen manga by Tadashi Kawashima and Adachitoka
- Alive: The Story of the Andes Survivors, a 1974 book by Piers Paul Read
- Alive (magazine), a monthly Canadian natural health magazine
- Alive! (newspaper), an Irish Catholic newspaper

== Film ==
- Alive (1993 film), by Frank Marshall based on the book Alive: The Story of the Andes Survivors
- Alive: 20 Years Later, a 1993 documentary about the book Alive: The Story of the Andes Survivors and the Frank Marshall film
- Alive (2002 film), a Japanese horror film by Ryuhei Kitamura based on the manga ALIVE
- Alive, a 2003 DVD by Audio Adrenaline
- Alive (2006 film), a Russian film by Aleksandr Veledinsky
- Alive (2009 film), an Albanian film by Artan Minarolli
- Alive (Meshuggah video), a 2010 concert film
- Alive (2014 film), a South Korean film by Park Jung-bum
- Alive, a 2016 Overwatch animated short film
- #Alive (2020 film), a South Korean film by Cho Il-hyung
- Alive (2026 film), an upcoming Spanish drama
- Alive Films, an American production company co-founded by Carolyn Pfeiffer

== Music ==
=== Albums ===
- Alive (10cc album), 1993
- Alive (3rd Party album), 1997
- Alive!! (Becca album), 2008
- Alive (BigBang album) or the title song, 2012
- Alive (Bruce Dickinson album), 2005
- Alive (Chick Corea album), 1991
- Alive (Do As Infinity album) or the title song, 2018
- Alive (Dr. Sin album), 1999
- Alive (Ed Kowalczyk album), 2010
- Alive! (Grant Green album), 1970
- Alive (Gryffin album) or the title song, 2022
- Alive (Hiromi album) or the title song, 2014
- Alive (Jacky Terrasson album), 1998
- Alive (Jessie J album) or the title song, 2013
- Alive (Kate Ryan album) or the title song (see below), 2006
- Alive (Kim Kyung-ho album), 2009
- Alive! (Kiss album), 1975
- Alive (Nitty Gritty Dirt Band album), 1969
- Alive (Rising Appalachia album), 2017
- Alive (Sa Dingding album) or the title song, 2007
- Alive (Shawn Desman album) or the title song, 2013
- Alive! (Snot album), 2002
- Alive! (Turbo album), 1986
- Alive (in concert), by Axelle Red, 2000
- Alive! The Millennium Concert, by Kiss, 2006
- Alive 1997, by Daft Punk, 2001
- Alive 2007, by Daft Punk, 2007
- Kenny Loggins Alive, 1980
- Alive or the title song, by Ben Haenow, 2018
- Alive, by Cimorelli, 2016
- Alive, by Crystal Bowersox, 2017
- Alive, by Julie Roberts, 2011

=== Mixtapes ===
- Alivë by Yeat, 2021

=== EPs ===
- Alive (Adler's Appetite EP) or the title song, 2012
- Alive (Big Bang EP) or the title song, 2012
- Alive (Ive EP), 2024
- Alive, by Target, 2018

=== Songs ===
- "Alive" (Beastie Boys song), 1999
- "Alive" (Bee Gees song), 1972
- "Alive" (Black Eyed Peas song), 2009
- "Alive" (Chase & Status song), 2013
- "Alive" (Dami Im song), 2013
- "Alive" (Empire of the Sun song), 2013
- "Alive" (Goldfrapp song), 2010
- "Alive" (Jennifer Lopez song), 2002
- "Alive" (Kanye West and YoungBoy Never Broke Again song), 2025
- "Alive" (Kate Ryan song), 2006
- "Alive" (Krewella song), 2012
- "Alive" (Lo-Pro song), 2010
- "Alive" (Melissa O'Neil song), 2005
- "Alive!" (Mondotek song), 2007
- "Alive" (Natalie Bassingthwaighte song), 2008
- "Alive" (Pearl Jam song), 1991
- "Alive" (P.O.D. song), 2001
- "Alive" (Rebecca St. James song), 2005
- "Alive" (Rüfüs Du Sol song), 2021
- "Alive" (S Club song), 2002
- "Alive" (Sia song), 2015
- "Alive" (Sonique song), 2003
- "Alive" (Vincent Bueno song), 2020
- "Alive"/"Physical Thing", by Koda Kumi, 2009
- "Alive", by Adelitas Way from Home School Valedictorian, 2011
- "Alive", by Black Veil Brides from Vindicate, 2026
- "Alive", by Bleed from Within from Era, 2018
- "Alive", by Breed 77 from In My Blood (En Mi Sangre), 2006
- "Alive", by Cheap Trick from The Latest, 2009
- "Alive", by Daft Punk from The New Wave, 1994 and later included on Homework, 1997
- "Alive", by Dala from Everyone Is Someone, 2009
- "Alive", by Drugstore, 1993
- "Alive", by Edwin from Another Spin Around the Sun, 1999
- "Alive", by Good Charlotte from Cardiology, 2010
- "Alive", by Gravity Kills from Perversion, 1998
- "Alive", by Hawk Nelson from Live Life Loud, 2009
- "Alive", by Hypocrisy from A Taste of Extreme Divinity, 2009
- "Alive", by Jennifer Brown, 1998
- "Alive", by Khalid from Free Spirit, 2019
- "Alive", by Kid Cudi from Man on the Moon: The End of Day, 2009
- "Alive", by Korn from Neidermayer's Mind, 1993 and later included on Take a Look in the Mirror, 2003
- "Alive", by Leona Lewis from Echo, 2009
- "Alive", by Lightsum, 2022
- "Alive", by Meat Loaf from Bat Out of Hell III: The Monster Is Loose, 2006
- "Alive", by Milky Chance from Blossom, 2017
- "Alive", by Monni, 2019
- "Alive", by Mýa from K.I.S.S. (Keep It Sexy & Simple), 2011
- "Alive", by Oasis from Shakermaker, 1994
- "Alive", by One Direction from Midnight Memories, 2013
- "Alive", by Ozzy Osbourne from Down to Earth, 2001
- "Alive", by Shihad from Love Is the New Hate, 2005
- "Alive", by Sick Individuals, 2016
- "Alive", by Sons of Apollo from Psychotic Symphony, 2017
- "Alive", by SR-71 from Now You See Inside, 2000
- "Alive", by Steve Aoki, 2017
- "Alive", by Wage War from Blueprints, 2015
- "Alive", by X Japan from Vanishing Vision, 1988
- "Alive!", from the musical Jekyll & Hyde, 1997
- "Alive", from the video game The Idolmaster Dearly Stars, 2009
- "Alive (N' Out Of Control)", by Papa Roach from The Paramour Sessions, 2006
- "Alive!", by Bakar from Halo, 2023

=== Events ===
- Alive 2006/2007, a concert tour by Daft Punk
- Alive! Tour, a 1975–1976 concert tour by Kiss
- Alive Festival, a Christian music festival in Mineral City, Ohio, US

=== Other music ===
- Alive Naturalsound Records, a record label
- "Alive", a television news music package by 615 Music

== Other uses ==
- "Alive!" (Cow and Chicken), a television episode
- "Alive!" (Justice League Unlimited), a television episode
- Alive 90.5, a radio station based in Sydney, Australia
- Alive, a 1998 PlayStation video game developed by General Entertainment

== See also ==
- Life (disambiguation)
- Live (disambiguation)
- Living (disambiguation)
