= Live =

Live may refer to:

== Arts, entertainment, and media ==
=== Films ===
- Live! (2007 film), 2007 American film
- Live (2014 film), a 2014 Japanese film
- Live (2023 film), a Malayalam-language film
- Live: Phát Trực Tiếp, a Vietnamese-language film
- Live (Apocalyptica DVD)

=== Music ===
- Live (band), American alternative rock band
- List of albums titled Live

==== Extended plays ====
- Live (Roxus EP)
- Live (The Smithereens EP)
- Live EP (Anal Cunt EP)
- Live EP (Arcade Fire EP)
- Live EP (Breaking Benjamin EP)
- Live EP (The Jam EP)
- Live E.P. (Led Zeppelin EP)
- CeCe Peniston (EP Live)
- Ozzy Osbourne Live E.P., 1980
- Live EP (Live at Fashion Rocks), by David Bowie

==== Songs ====
- "Live" (Russian song)
- "Live" (Superfly song)
- "Live" (The Merry-Go-Round song)
- "Live", by B'z from Highway X, 2022

=== Radio stations ===
- 938LIVE, the former name of Singaporean radio station CNA938
- BBC Radio 5 Live
- CILV-FM, branded LiVE 88.5, a radio station in Ottawa, Canada
- BR24live, a German radio station

=== Television shows ===
- Live (South Korean TV series), a 2018 South Korean television series
- Live! (TV channel), Italy
- Live with Kelly and Mark, US TV talk show

=== Types of media ===
- Live action (cinematography), a motion picture not produced using animation
- Live art
- Live music, a concert
  - Live album, recording of a live music concert
- Live broadcast, for radio, television, streaming, etc.

== Information and communication technologies ==
- .live, a top-level Internet domain
- Live.ly, social media streaming company
- Live CD, an operating system bootable from CD
- Live coding, on-the-fly computer programming
- Live Search, search engine
- Live Universal Awareness Map, online mapping of activities
- Live USB, an operating system bootable from a USB flash drive

== Other uses ==
- Ableton Live, digital audio workstation software
- Edel Live, a South Korean single-plane paraglider
- Live fire exercise, using real ammunition
- Live! Casino & Hotel Philadelphia, a casino hotel in Philadelphia
- Live Deila, Norwegian handball player

== See also ==
- Alive (disambiguation)
- Live birth (disambiguation)
- Life (disambiguation)
- Lives (disambiguation)
- Live.com (disambiguation)
- Lively (disambiguation)
- Living (disambiguation)
