= Personal Life (disambiguation) =

Personal life is the course or state of an individual's life.

Personal Life may also refer to:

- Personal Life (album), a 2010 album by The Thermals
- Personal Life Media, U.S. online publisher of podcasts, courses, workshops

== See also ==
- Category:personal life
- Shiseikatsu (disambiguation) (Japanese: 私生活, lit. 'private life, personal life', しせいかつ)
- Private Lives (disambiguation)
- Private life (disambiguation)
- Social life (disambiguation)
- Personal (disambiguation)
- Lives (disambiguation)
- Life (disambiguation)
- Public life (disambiguation)
