= Bob Payne =

American puppeteer and puppet builder

Bob Payne is an American retired puppeteer and puppet builder. He is also known as Robert Payne and Bobby Payne.

== History ==
Payne, a native of Washington, D.C., was a college friend of Jim Henson and Jane Henson. He first worked with them on Jim Henson's show Sam and Friends as a backup puppeteer. He took part in some of Jim Henson's advertising where he was the principal performer of the Mirinda Craver from the Mirinda commercials.

Payne later went on to build several characters for The Muppet Show and other projects where he did occasional puppeteering.

He later received a special credit as a historian in The Muppets: A Celebration of 30 Years.

== Filmography ==
=== Television ===
- Mister Rogers' Neighborhood - Himself
- Sam and Friends - Additional Muppets
- Sesame Street - Telly Monster, Veggie Monster, Additional Muppets
- The Muppet Show - Astoria, Additional Muppets
- John Denver and the Muppets: A Christmas Together - Additional Muppets
- The Muppets Go to the Movies - Additional Muppets

=== Film ===
- The Dark Crystal - SkekOk/The Scroll Keeper (performer)
- The Great Muppet Caper - Additional Muppets
- The Muppet Movie - Additional Muppets

=== Advertising ===
- Mirinda - Mirinda Craver

| Preceded by none | Telly Monster; 1979 | Succeeded by Brian Muehl |

== Puppet designer works ==
- Sesame Street - Builder of the original Telly Monster puppet
- Tales of the Tinkerdee - Palace Guard's helmet (later used as part of Super Grover's outfit)
- The Dark Crystal - Podlings fabrication team
- The Muppet Show - Builder for Mulch, Pinocchio, Punch and Judy, and others
