= Social networking (disambiguation) =

Social network is a theoretical concept in the social sciences, particularly sociology and anthropology, referring to a social structure made up of individuals or organizations. It may also refer to:

== Internet-related ==
- Community network, a term used broadly to indicate the use of networking technologies by, and for, a local community
- Social networking service, online sites to connect people with similar interests
- Distributed social network, an Internet social networking service that is decentralized and distributed across different providers
- Social network game, online games where many people can play at once
- Social networking websites, a list of major active social networking websites and excludes dating websites (see Comparison of online dating services)
- Social network aggregation, the process of collecting content from multiple social networking services
- Social network automation, tools that are used to semi/automate the process of posting content to social networking and social bookmarking websites
- Social media
- Social media marketing, marketing and advertising practices with Internet-based applications
- Social networking spam, spam directed at users of internet social networking services

== Business-related ==
- Enterprise social networking, focuses on the use of online social networks or social relations among people who share business interests and/or activities.
- Professional network service, (or, in an internet context, simply a professional network) is a type of social network service that is focused solely on interactions and relationships of a business nature
- Business networking, is an activity in which groups of like-minded business people recognize, create, or act upon business opportunities

== Movie ==
- The Social Network, 2010 docudrama film about the founding of Facebook

== Other ==
- Scientific collaboration network, how scientists work together across social networks

== See also ==
- Social network (disambiguation)
- Networking (disambiguation), which also covers network
