= Kermit the Frog =

Muppet character

- The Muppets and Sesame Street character
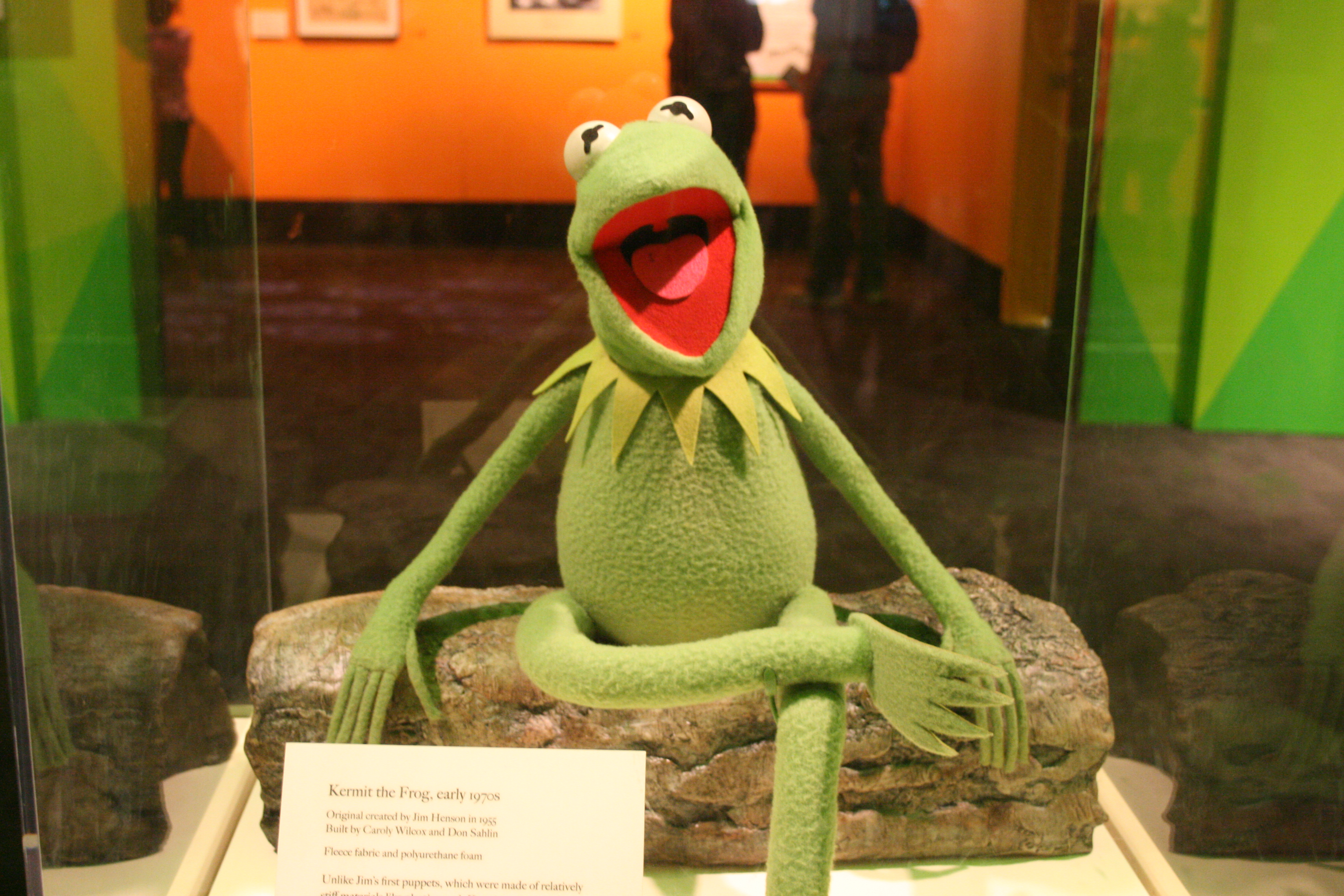
- A Kermit puppet on display at the Museum of Science and Industry in Chicago in 2010
- First appearance: Afternoon on WRC-TV (1955)
- Created by: Jim Henson
- Performed by: Jim Henson (1955–1990); Steve Whitmire (1990–2016); Matt Vogel (2017–present)

In-universe information
- Species: Muppet frog
- Gender: Male
- Occupation: Entertainer; stage manager; show producer; director; reporter
- Family: Robin the Frog (nephew)
- Significant other: Miss Piggy (on-and-off)
- Nationality: American
- Musical instruments: Banjo, vocals

Kermit the Frog is a Muppet character created in 1955 and originally performed by Jim Henson. An anthropomorphic green frog, Kermit is the pragmatic everyman protagonist of numerous Muppet productions, most notably as the showrunner and host of the sketch comedy television series The Muppet Show and a featured role on Sesame Street. He has appeared in other television series, feature films, specials, and public service announcements through the years. He also served as a mascot of The Jim Henson Company and appeared in various Henson projects until 2004, when the character was acquired by The Walt Disney Company.

Kermit performed the hit singles "Bein' Green" in 1970 for Sesame Street and "Rainbow Connection" in 1979 for The Muppet Movie, the first feature-length film featuring the Muppets. Kermit's original performance of "Rainbow Connection" reached No. 25 on the Billboard Hot 100 and was added to the Library of Congress's National Recording Registry in 2021. Henson performed Kermit until his death in 1990, after which Steve Whitmire performed Kermit from that time until his dismissal in 2016; Kermit has been performed by Matt Vogel since 2017. He was also voiced by Frank Welker in Muppet Babies and occasionally in other animation projects, and is voiced by Matt Danner in the 2018 reboot of Muppet Babies.

Kermit has remained as a recognizable character in popular culture worldwide for over half a century, starring in several television series and films, and receiving dozens of honors and awards by various organizations. In 2006, the character was credited as the author of Before You Leap: A Frog's Eye View of Life's Greatest Lessons, an "autobiography" told from the perspective of the character himself.

== History and development ==
A set of commercials for McGarry's Sausages featuring the original incarnation of Kermit

Kermit the Frog first appeared on local programs and commercials broadcast on WRC-TV, most notably Sam and Friends. This prototype Kermit was created from a discarded turquoise spring coat belonging to Jim Henson's mother and two ping pong ball halves for eyes.

Initially, Kermit was a vague lizard-like creature. He subsequently made a number of television appearances before his status as a frog was established in the television special Hey, Cinderella! in 1969. His triangular-pointed collar was added at the time to make him seem more frog-like and to conceal the seam between his head and body. According to Michael K. Frith, the relatively simple construction of the Kermit puppet allows the performer's arm and hand to produce a wide range of expression and gestures.

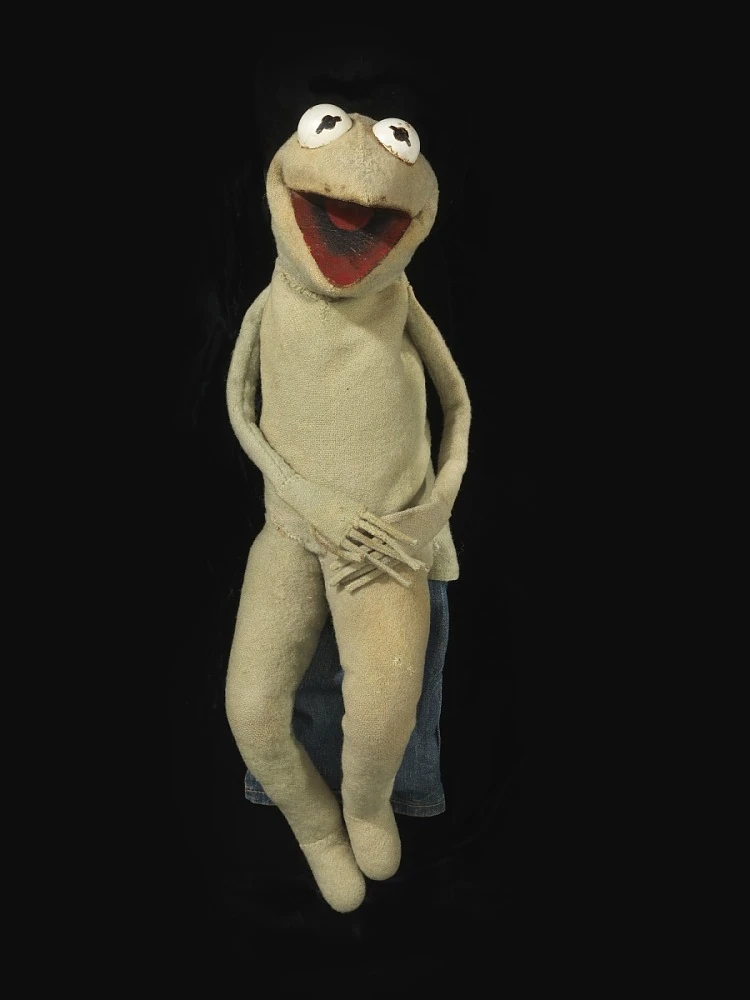
The original Kermit puppet from Sam and Friends, c. 1955

=== Naming ===
The origin of Kermit's name is a subject of some debate. It is often claimed that Kermit was named after Henson's childhood friend Kermit Scott, from Leland, Mississippi. However, Karen Falk, head archivist and board of directors member for the Jim Henson Legacy organization, denies this claim, stating that Henson merely liked how the named sounded:

While Jim Henson did have a childhood acquaintance named Kermit, it was not an uncommon name at the time, and Jim always said that the Frog was not named after this child from his elementary school. I think Jim just liked the sound of the name - it has nice hard sounds and a sort of nasal quality that make it rather funny.

Joy DiMenna, the only daughter of Kermit Kalman Cohen, who worked as a sound engineer at WBAL-TV during Jim Henson's time with Sam and Friends, recalls that the puppet was named after her father. According to Cohen's obituary, as well as DiMenna and Lenny Levin, a colleague of Cohen's at WBAL:

The late puppeteer had been the host of a show, Sam and Friends, at WRC-TV in Washington when he was invited to tour WBAL's studios. Both were NBC affiliates then, and WBAL carried the show, Mr. Levin said.

Mr. Henson was introduced to members of the sound and camera crew, including Mr. Cohen.

"When he heard his name, Jim turned around, snapped his fingers and said to his wife, 'That's what we call the frog – Kermit.'"

Another common belief is that Kermit was named for Kermit Love, who worked with Henson in designing and constructing Muppets, particularly on Sesame Street. However, Love's association with Henson did not begin until well after Kermit's creation and naming, and he always denied any connection between his name and that of the character.

As Sesame Street is localized for some different markets that speak languages other than English, Kermit is often renamed. In Portugal, he is called Cocas, o Sapo (sapo means "toad"). In Brazil, his name is similar to his name in Portugal: Caco, o Sapo. In most of Hispanic America, his name is la rana René (René the Frog), while in Spain, he is named Gustavo. In the Arabic version, he is known as Kamel, which is a common Arabic male name that means "perfect". In Hungary, he is called Breki (onomatopoetic).

=== Characterization and performers ===
Jim Henson originated the character in 1955 on his local television series, Sam and Friends. Jim Henson described Kermit as "kind of easy-going, very likable...sometimes slightly a wiseguy." Frank Oz remarked that Kermit possesses a natural sense of leadership within the Muppets, explaining that "he has all these zany characters and a world around him and he tries to be the center and hold everything together...sometimes he gets too much and blows his top, but essentially he kind of goes with the flow." Brian Henson described his father's performance as Kermit as "coming out of his own personality—was a wry intelligence, a little bit of a naughtiness, but Kermit always loved everyone around and also loved a good prank."

Kermit has often been referred to as Jim Henson's "soft-spoken alter-ego." Many of Jim Henson's colleagues have confirmed how close and inseparable he and Kermit's personalities were. Jim Henson's agent Bernie Brillstein has stated straightforwardly that "Kermit was Jim". Author Brian Jay Jones described the relationship accordingly: "The more Jim performed Kermit, the more the two of them seemed to become intertwined…it was becoming harder to tell where the frog ended and Jim began." Jim Henson continued to perform the character until his death in 1990. His last performance as Kermit was for an appearance on The Arsenio Hall Show to promote the television special The Muppets at Walt Disney World. Jim Henson died twelve days after that appearance.

Following his death, veteran Muppet performer Steve Whitmire was named Kermit's new performer. Whitmire claims that Jim Henson had seemingly intended to pass on the role to him before he died, though it was Jane Henson and son Brian who had selected him. Whitmire's first public performance as Kermit was at the end of the television special The Muppets Celebrate Jim Henson in 1990. Whitmire explained that his main intent when he inherited Kermit "was to make sure the character stayed the same and consistent, but didn't become stale and just a copy."

Kermit's personality during Whitmire's tenure was widely described as more wholesome, lighthearted, and Pollyanna-ish than Jim Henson's. Several critics of Whitmire's portrayal have come from the Henson family. Brian Henson stated that while Whitmire's performance was "sometimes excellent, and always pretty good", he also elaborated that "Kermit has, as a character, flattened out over time and has become too square and not as vital as it should have been." Cheryl Henson stated that Whitmire performed the character as a "bitter, angry, depressed, victim". She also stated; "He's not Kermit — he's a performer who was hired to do Kermit. There's a difference." Whitmire remained Kermit's principal performer until October 2016, when he was dismissed by The Muppets Studio and its parent company Disney, which own the rights to Kermit. Disney cited "unacceptable business conduct" as reason for the dismissal, while Whitmire claims the decision was made due to creative disagreements over Kermit's characterization and prolonged labor union negotiations that delayed his involvement in Muppet productions.

Disney announced that Matt Vogel would become Kermit's new performer on July 10, 2017. His first official appearance as Kermit was in a "Muppet Thought of the Week" video released on YouTube in August 2017.

John Kennedy performed Kermit for Muppets Ahoy!, a 2006 Disney Cruise Line stage show (though Whitmire performed Kermit for the first few shows). Muppet performer Artie Esposito briefly performed Kermit in 2009 for a few personal appearances (an appearance on America's Got Talent, the MTV Video Music Awards, and at the D23 Expo). Voice actor Frank Welker provided the voice of Baby Kermit on the animated series Muppet Babies. He also provided the voice of an adult Kermit for a short-lived spin-off, Little Muppet Monsters. Brian Cummings voiced Kermit in a 1995 CBS promotion. Wally Wingert provided the voice of Baby Kermit in a Muppet Babies CD-ROM. Matt Danner voices Baby Kermit on the 2018 reboot of Muppet Babies.

=== Fictional biography ===
External videos
- Yay! Kermit Arm Flail, Disney UK

A biography has been developed for Kermit the Frog as if he were an actual living performer rather than a puppet character. According to this fictional biography, he was born in Leland, Mississippi, alongside approximately 2,353 siblings; however, a 2011 "interview" on The Ellen DeGeneres Show has him state that he was from the swamps of Louisiana.

As portrayed in the 2002 film Kermit's Swamp Years, at the age of 12, he was the first of his siblings to leave the swamp and one of the first frogs to talk to humans. He is shown in the film encountering a 12-year-old Jim Henson (played by Christian Kebbel) for the first time.

According to The Muppet Movie, Kermit returned to the swamp, where a passing agent noted he had talent. Thus inspired, Kermit headed to Hollywood, encountering the rest of the Muppets along the way. Together, they were given a standard "rich and famous" contract by Lew Lord of Wide World Studios and began their showbiz careers. In Before You Leap, Kermit again references encountering Jim Henson sometime after the events depicted in the course of The Muppet Movie and details their friendship and their partnership in the entertainment industry, crediting Henson as being the individual to whom he owes his fame. At some point after the events of The Muppet Movie, Kermit and the other Muppets begin The Muppet Show, and the characters remain together as a group, before starring in the other Muppet films and Muppets Tonight, with Kermit usually at the core of the stories as the lead protagonist. Kermit is shown in The Muppet Movie as stating that the events of the film are "approximately how it happened" when asked by his nephew Robin about how the Muppets got started.

Fozzie Bear is portrayed as Kermit's best friend—a fact reiterated by Kermit in Before You Leap—and the two were frequently seen together during sketches on The Muppet Show and in other Muppet-related media and merchandise.

On August 4, 2015, Kermit the Frog and Miss Piggy "announced" that they had ended their romantic relationship. On September 2, 2015, Kermit was stated to have found a new girlfriend, a pig named Denise, but around February 2016, Denise supposedly broke up with Kermit after almost six months together.

== Career ==
Kermit has been featured prominently on both The Muppet Show and Sesame Street, and is the only Muppet to do so in that capacity. However, he had a prominent career before Sesame Street's debut in 1969, as he starred in Sam and Friends, and numerous Muppets made guest appearances on Today from 1961 and The Ed Sullivan Show from 1966.

=== Sesame Street ===
Kermit and Elmo in one of Kermit's many lecture segments

Kermit was one of the original main Muppet characters on Sesame Street. Closely identified with the show, Kermit usually appeared as a lecturer on simple topics, a straight man to another Muppet foil (usually Grover, Herry Monster or Cookie Monster), or a news reporter interviewing storybook characters for Sesame Street News. He sang many songs on the show, including "Bein' Green", and was the focus of the 1998 video The Best of Kermit on Sesame Street.

Unlike the rest of the show's Muppets, Kermit was never the property of Sesame Workshop and has only occasionally been a part of the show's merchandise. When Sesame Workshop bought full ownership of its characters from Henson for $180 million, Kermit was excluded from the deal. The character now belongs to The Muppets Studio, a division of Disney.

Kermit made his first Sesame Street appearance under Disney's ownership with a cameo in "Elmo's World: Frogs" on the season 40 premiere episode in 2009. His most recent appearance was on the Sesame Street's 50th Anniversary Celebration in 2019, where he performed "Bein' Green" with Elvis Costello.

=== With the Muppets ===
In The Muppet Show television series, Kermit was the central character, the showrunner, and the long-suffering stage manager of the theater show, trying to keep order amidst the chaos created by the other Muppets. Henson once claimed that Kermit's job on the Muppet Show was much like his own: "trying to get a bunch of crazies to actually get the job done." It was on this show that the running gag of Kermit being pursued by leading lady Miss Piggy developed.

On Muppets Tonight, Kermit was still a main character, although he was the producer rather than frontman. He appeared in many parody sketches such as NYPD Green, City Schtickers, Flippers, and The Muppet Odd Squad, as well as in the Psychiatrist's Office sketch.

As with most Disney characters, Kermit appears at various Disney theme parks. Kermit is featured in Muppet*Vision 3D, an attraction that opened on May 16, 1991 and closed on June 8, 2025, at Disney's Hollywood Studios at Walt Disney World in Lake Buena Vista, Florida. The character was also formerly featured in the aforementioned attraction in Disney California Adventure Park at the Disneyland Resort in Anaheim, California until its closure in 2014. Kermit also appeared in The Muppets Present...Great Moments in American History at the Magic Kingdom from 2016 to 2020. He also appeared in two parades; Disney Stars and Motor Cars Parade which ran at Disney's Hollywood Studios from 2001 to 2008 and Disney's Honorary VoluntEars Cavalcade which was held during 2010 at the Magic Kingdom and Disneyland.

=== Filmography ===
Kermit the Frog has appeared in almost every Muppet production, as well as making guest appearances in other shows and movies.

Below is a list of his more well-known appearances:

- Sam and Friends (1955–1961) (TV)
- Afternoon (1955) (TV)
- The Steve Allen Show (1956-1957) (TV)
- Tonight Show Starring Jack Paar (1957) (TV)
- Today (American TV program) (1961-1963, 1977, 1982, 1984, 1989, 1990, 1999, 2001, 2002, 2006, 2008, 2009, 2014, 2021, 2025)
- Tales of the Tinkerdee (1962)
- The Jack Paar Program (1963-1965)
- The Tonight Show Starring Johnny Carson (1965, 1968-1969, 1974-1977, 1979, 1989) (TV)
- The Mike Douglas Show (1966, 1975, 1977, 1979)
- The Hollywood Palace (1966)
- The Ed Sullivan Show (1966-1968, 1970)
- The Wonderful Night of Hercules Brown (1968) (TV Special)
- Sesame Street (1969–1990, 1996–2001, 2009, 2019) (TV)
- Hey, Cinderella! (1969) (TV)
- The Muppets on Puppets (1970) (TV)
- Evening at Pops (1971) (TV)
- The Dick Cavett Show (1971, 1973)
- Pure Goldie (1971) (TV Special)
- This Is Tom Jones (1971) (TV)
- The Frog Prince (1971) (TV)
- The Flip Wilson Show (1971) (TV)
- The David Frost Show (1971) (TV)
- The Muppet Musicians of Bremen (1972) (TV)
- Julie on Sesame Street (1973) (TV)
- Emmy Awards (1973, 1977, 1979, 1982, 1989, 2004) (TV)
- The Muppets Valentine Show (1974) (TV)
- Out to Lunch (TV program) (1974) (TV)
- Wonderama (1974) (TV)
- The Muppet Show: Sex and Violence (1975) (TV)
- Cher (TV series) (1975) (TV)
- Dinah! (1975-1977) (TV)
- Peter Alexander präsentiert Spezialitäten (1975/1977) (TV)
- Good Morning America (1976,1987-1988,1992,1996-1998, 2002, 2004-2006, 2008-2009, 2011-2012, 2014-2016, 2019-2020)
- The Muppet Show (1976–1981) (TV)
- Royal Variety Performance (1977,1993) (TV)
- The Bob Hope All Star Christmas Comedy Special (1977)
- Emmet Otter's Jug-Band Christmas (1977) (TV)
- Bob Hope's Birthday Special (1978)
- Bob Hope's Salute to the 75th Anniversary of the World Series (1978)
- Christmas Eve on Sesame Street (1978)
- The Orson Welles Show (1979)
- The Muppets Go to Hollywood (1979)
- The Muppet Movie (1979)
- John Denver and the Muppets: A Christmas Together (1979)
- Here Come the Puppets! (1980)
- Academy Awards (1980, 1982, 1986, 2012)
- The Muppets Go to the Movies (1981)
- The Great Muppet Caper (1981)
- I Love Liberty (1982)
- The Fantastic Miss Piggy Show (1982)
- Wetten, dass..? (1983)
- Rocky Mountain Holiday (1983)
- Henson's Place: The Man Behind the Muppets (1984)
- Entertainment Tonight (1984, 1987, 1992, 2011, 2012, 2022)
- The Muppets Take Manhattan (1984)
- Muppet Babies (1984–1991) (TV) (voiced by Frank Welker)
- Sesame Street Presents Follow That Bird (1985)
- Little Muppet Monsters (1985)
- Happy New Year, America (1985-1986)
- The Muppets: A Celebration of 30 Years (1986) (TV)
- Blue Peter (1986, 1992, 1996, 2006, 2012, 2014)
- The Christmas Toy (1986) (TV)
- ABC News Special: Wall Street and the Economy (1987) (TV Special)
- A Muppet Family Christmas (1987) (TV)
- Sesame Street, Special (1988) (TV)
- View-Master Interactive Vision (1988)
- Jim Henson Play-Along Video (1988)
1. Hey, You're as Funny as Fozzie Bear: A Comedy Show Starring Fozzie Bear and You
2. Wow, You're a Cartoonist!
3. Sing-Along, Dance-Along, Do-Along: Rowlf teaches kids about music
- Free to Be... a Family (1988) (TV)
- Sesame Street: 20 and Still Counting (1989) (TV)
- The Jim Henson Hour (1989) (TV)
- 50 Years of Television: A Golden Celebration (1989)
- Disney Parks Christmas Day Parade (1989, 1992, 2004, 2010-2011, 2015, 2021)
- Live! (1990, 2001, 2006, 2014, 2016)
- The Arsenio Hall Show (1989/1990) (TV)
- Cartoon All-Stars to the Rescue (1990) (TV) (voiced by Frank Welker)
- The Earth Day Special (1990) (TV)
- The Muppets at Walt Disney World (1990) (TV)
- The Muppets Celebrate Jim Henson (1990) (TV)
- Sesame Street: Numbers (1991) (computer game)
- Sesame Street: Letters (1991) (computer game)
- On Television: Teach the Children (1992)
- The Muppet Christmas Carol (1992) – Appearance as Bob Cratchit
- Friday Night Videos (1993)
- Larry King Live (1993, 1994, 1996) (TV)
- 60 Minutes (1993)
- Muppet Sing Alongs (1993-1996)
1. Billy Bunny's Animal Songs (1993)
2. It's Not Easy Being Green (1994)
3. Muppet Treasure Island Sing Along (1996)
4. Things That Fly (1996)
- Environmental Media Awards (1994-1996)
- 48 Hours (TV program) (1994)
- Walt Disney World Inside Out (1994, 1996)
- Charlie Rose (talk show) (1994)
- Late Night with Conan O'Brien (1994)
- Muppet Classic Theater (1994) (Direct-to-Video) – Appearance as King Midas and the King in Rumpelstiltskin.
- Jim Henson's Preschool Collection (1995)
1. Muppets on Wheels
2. Yes, I Can Be a Friend
3. Yes, I Can Learn
4. Yes, I Can Help
- Challenge Anneka (1995)
- Mr. Willowby's Christmas Tree (1995)
- Muppet Treasure Island (1996) – Appearance as Captain Abraham Smollett
- Muppets Tonight (1996–1998) (TV)
- The Rosie O'Donnell Show (1996, 1999)
- MTV Global (1996)
- BBC News (1996)
- The Big Breakfast (1996)
- Children in Need (1996-1997, 2011)
- The Tonight Show with Jay Leno (1996, 1999)
- Hotel Babylon (music programme) (1996)
- Elmo Saves Christmas (1996)
- Elmopalooza (1998)
- The Best of Kermit on Sesame Street (1998) (Direct-to-Video)
- The View (1998-1999, 2008, 2012-2015, 2021)
- The Roseanne Show (1999)
- Access Hollywood (1999, 2009)
- Wheel of Fortune (1999)
- KTLA Morning News (1999, 2014-2015)
- Muppets from Space (1999)
- CinderElmo (1999)
- SIGGRAPH (2000)
- Who Wants to Be a Millionaire (American game show) (2000)
- The Daily Show (2001)
- Songwriters Hall of Fame (2001)
- Hollywood Squares (2001-2003)
- The Jerry Lewis MDA Labor Day Telethon (2001) (TV)
- America's Funniest Home Videos (2001, 2005, 2010)
- Telling Stories with Tomie dePaola (2001) (TV)
- Family Feud (2001)
- Jeopardy! (2002)
- Kermit's Swamp Years (2002) (Direct-to-Video)
- Morning Edition (2002, 2005)
- The Wayne Brady Show (2002-2003)
- It's a Very Merry Muppet Christmas Movie (2002) (TV)
- The Other Half (talk show) (2003)
- Genesis Awards (2003)
- I Love the '70s (American TV series) (2003)
- Jimmy Kimmel Live (2003, 2015, 2026)
- Extra (2004, 2014, 2026) (TV)
- Saturday Night Live (1975/76, 2004, 2011) (TV)
- Ant & Dec's Saturday Night Takeaway (2004)
- The Muppets' Wizard of Oz (2005) (TV) – Appearance as himself and The Scarecrow
- The Late Late Show with Craig Ferguson (2005, 2008)
- TV Land Awards (2006)
- Mr. Magorium's Wonder Emporium (2007) (cameo)
- Studio DC: Almost Live (2008) (TV)
- A Muppets Christmas: Letters to Santa (2008) (TV)
- Christmas in Rockefeller Center (2008-2009), (2012) TV
- The One Show (2009, 2014, 2020)
- My Christmas Special (2009) (TV)
- ABC World News Tonight (2009)
- The Muppets Kitchen with Cat Cora (2010) (web-series)
- The Muppets (2011)
- "30 Rock (2012) - Appearance as himself in "My Whole Life Is Thunder"
- Good Luck Charlie (2013) (TV) – Appearance as himself in "Duncan Dream House"
- Lady Gaga and the Muppets Holiday Spectacular (2013) (TV)
- Puppy Bowl (2014)
- ¡Despierta América! (2014)
- The Bachelor (2014)
- Muppets Most Wanted (2014)
- The Muppets (2015–2016) (TV)
- Muppet Babies (2018–2022) (TV) (voiced by Matt Danner)
- Sesame Street's 50th Anniversary Celebration (2019) (TV)
- Muppets Now (2020) (TV)
- Amphibia (2020) (TV) – Appearance as the voice of Crumpet the Frog in "Swamp and Sensibility"
- The Masked Singer (2021) (TV) – The Snail (performed in season five), Guest appearance (season eight)
- Muppets Haunted Mansion (2021) (TV) – Appearance as himself and a Ghost
- The Muppet Show (2026) (TV)
- 2026 FIFA World Cup final halftime show (2026)

== Cultural impact ==
=== Accolades and commemorations ===
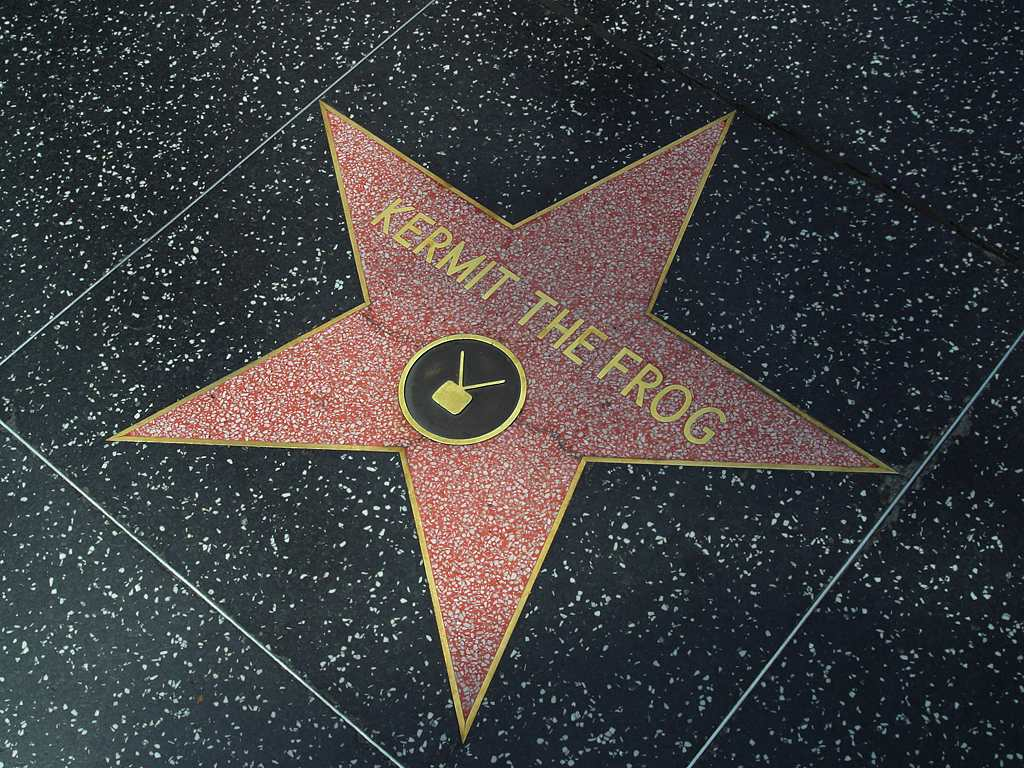
Kermit's star on the Hollywood Walk of Fame

Kermit was awarded an honorary doctorate of Amphibious Letters (a pun on the more common honorary degree, Doctor of Humane Letters) on May 19, 1996, at Southampton College, New York, where he also gave a commencement speech. He is also the only "amphibian" to have had the honor of addressing the Oxford Union. A statue of Henson and Kermit was erected on the campus of Henson's alma mater, the University of Maryland, College Park in 2003. Kermit gave the commencement speech at the university for its graduating class of 2025.

Kermit was also given the honor of being the grand marshal of the Tournament of Roses Parade in 1996. The Macy's Thanksgiving Day Parade has featured a Kermit balloon since 1977. Kermit also served as the mascot for The Jim Henson Company, until the sale of the Muppet characters to Disney.

On November 14, 2002, Kermit the Frog received a star on the Hollywood Walk of Fame in the category of Television. The star is located at 6801 Hollywood Blvd. Kermit has two stars on the Walk of Fame, the other as a member of the collective The Muppets, which they received on March 20, 2012 in the category of Motion Pictures.

On Kermit's 50th birthday in 2005, the United States Postal Service released a set of new stamps with photos of Kermit and some of his fellow Muppets on them. The background of the stamp sheet features a photo of a silhouetted Henson sitting in a window well, with Kermit sitting in his lap looking at him.

Kermit was also the grand marshal for Michigan State University's homecoming parade in 2006.

In 2013, the original Kermit puppet from Sam and Friends was donated to the Smithsonian Institution in Washington, D.C. for display in the pop culture gallery. In 2015, the Leland Chamber of Commerce in Leland, Mississippi opened a small museum containing puppets and memorabilia dedicated to Kermit. A Kermit puppet can be seen at the National Museum of American History.

Kermit's legacy is also deeply entrenched in the science community. One of the famous WP-3D Orion research platforms flown by the NOAA Hurricane Hunters is named after Kermit. The other is named after Miss Piggy. In 2015, the discovery of the Costa Rican glass frog Hyalinobatrachium dianae also attracted viral media attention due to the creature's perceived resemblance to Kermit, with researcher Brian Kubicki quoted as saying "I am glad that this species has ended up getting so much international attention, and in doing so it is highlighting the amazing amphibians that are native to Costa Rica and the need to continue exploring and studying the country's amazing tropical forests". In 2024, researchers named Kermitops gratus as a new genus and species of fossil "proto-amphibian" from rocks dating to the early Permian period of Texas, US. The genus name, which means "Kermit face" in Greek, references the general resemblance of the fossil skull to the Muppets character's head.

=== Guest television appearances ===
Kermit has made numerous guest appearances on popular television shows, including co-hosting individual episodes of a number of long-running talk shows; among other television media. On April 2, 1979, Kermit guest-hosted The Tonight Show Starring Johnny Carson to promote The Muppet Movie. From 1983 to 1995, the French political satire show Le Bébête Show used copies of various Muppets to parody key political figures, and Kermit renamed "Kermitterrand", embodied President François Mitterrand. On May 21, 2018, Kermit and contestant Maddie Poppe performed "Rainbow Connection" live on American Idol.

A still photo of Kermit sitting in his Director's chair with his megaphone in his hand from The Muppet Show appeared on a technical difficulties telop graphic on Metromedia owned-and-operated station KTTV Channel 11 in Los Angeles during the late 1970s and early 1980s. At the same time, Kermit also appeared in WTNH in New Haven, Connecticut's own technical difficulties telop graphic, featuring a still photo of him sitting in front of the master control switcher, wearing headsets with a forlorn look on his face, noticing that there's something wrong inside the control room.

As an April Fool's joke, Kermit hosted CNN's Larry King Live in 1994 and interviewed Hulk Hogan. Kermit was also a semi-regular during various incarnations of Hollywood Squares.

In 2020, Kermit appeared on Monday Night Football with other Muppets characters as it was briefly rebranded "Muppet Night Football." On March 10, 2021, Kermit was the first celebrity to be unmasked on the fifth season of The Masked Singer, having performed in costume as "Snail".

On May 7, 2023, Kermit, along with Miss Piggy, was invited to the Coronation Concert of King Charles III. He sat next to Prince Edward, The Duke of Edinburgh.

=== Merchandising ===
Jim Henson's characters, including the Muppets, have inspired merchandise internationally, with Chris Bensch, chief curator of Rochester, New York's The Strong National Museum of Play, reporting "There seems to have been a particular craze for Kermit the Frog in Japan," likely due to the "cuteness appeal". Baby Kermit plush toys became popular in the 1980s after the success of Muppet Babies.

In 1991, one year after Jim Henson died, merchandise featuring Kermit and other Muppet characters was being sold at Disney theme parks, causing Henson Associates to file a lawsuit against Disney for copyright infringement. Henson alleged that the "counterfeit merchandise" falsely indicated that the characters belonged to Disney, although the latter company had the right to exercise use of the characters due to an earlier licensing agreement. The Henson Associates highlighted a T-shirt displaying Kermit, the Disney brand, and a copyright symbol. Disney representative Erwin Okun said the lawsuit was "outrageous" and "an unfortunate break with the legacy of a fine relationship with Disney that Jim Henson left behind". Disney later acquired the Muppets, and thusly, clothes, toys and souvenirs depicting Kermit and the Muppets continued to be sold at Disney theme parks and stores.

The Leland Chamber of Commerce's small Kermit-themed museum set out to preserve some of the dolls and merchandise. In 2016, The New Zealand Herald reported a hat featuring Kermit sipping Lipton tea, associated with the "But That's None of My Business" Internet meme, became a popular seller after basketball player LeBron James drew attention for wearing one.

=== Kermit in Internet culture ===
In July 2002, Kermit starred alongside the members of Weezer and other Muppets in the music video for Keep Fishin'.

In March 2007, Sad Kermit, an unofficial parody, was uploaded to the website YouTube, showing a store-bought Kermit puppet performing a version of the Nine Inch Nails song "Hurt" in a style similar to Johnny Cash's famous cover version. In contrast to the real Kermit character's usual family-friendly antics, the video shows the puppet engaging in drug abuse, smoking, alcoholism, performing oral sex on Rowlf the Dog, smashing a picture of Miss Piggy (with a breast exposed) and attempting suicide. The video became an Internet meme. The Victoria Times Colonist called it an "online sensation". The Chicago Sun-Times said it "puts the high in 'Hi-ho!'" The London Free Press said "Sad Kermit is in a world of pain". The Houston Press described it as the "world's most revolting web phenomenon". SF Weekly described the unauthorized video as "ironic slandering". Clips have been featured on the Canadian television series The Hour, where host George Stroumboulopoulos speculated that the Kermit version of "Hurt" was inspired by the Cash version rather than that of Nine Inch Nails.

Kermit has also appeared in a popular meme in which he is shown sipping tea, "one used when you sassily point something out, and then slyly back away, claiming that it's not [your] business". The photo is taken from "Be More Kermit," a Lipton advertisement that aired in 2014, and was adapted into the "But That's None of My Business" meme by African American comedians on the Tumblr blog Kermit the Snitch, making appearances on Twitter, Instagram and Facebook. Charles Pulliam-Moore of the TV station Fusion praised "But That's None of My Business" as "a symbol for the comedic brilliance born out of black communities on the internet", but Stephanie Hayes of Bustle magazine criticized the memes as racist and obscene.

In 2016, a Good Morning America post on Twitter referred to the "But That's None of My Business" meme as "Tea Lizard", becoming the subject of viral online derision. New York magazine replied that, "Kermit is a frog. A frog is an amphibian. A lizard is a reptile. It's just so insulting. Beyond a frog and a lizard both being clearly ectothermic, they couldn't be any more different. Not all green things are the same, you ignorant bastards". Popular Science also addressed the misnomer, writing "Frogs, which are amphibians, have quite a few significant differences from reptiles in how they breathe, their life cycles, whether they have scales or not... there's a lot to absorb here."

In November 2016, a new meme surfaced of Kermit talking to a hooded version of himself which represents the self and its dark inner thoughts. It involves captioning of a screenshot taken from the Muppets Most Wanted movie of Kermit and Constantine looking at each other.
