= Public life =

Public life may refer to:

- Politics
- Public Life, a 1984 album by Eddie Schwartz
- Public Life with Randy David, a Filipino public affairs program

== See also ==
- Social life (disambiguation)
- Public relations
- Public (disambiguation)
- Lives (disambiguation)
- Life (disambiguation)
- Personal life
- Private life (disambiguation)
