= Vie privée =

Vie privée may refer to:

- Private Life (1942 film), directed by Walter Kapps
- A Very Private Affair, 1962 film directed by Louis Malle
- A Private Life, 2025 film directed by Rebecca Zlotowski

== See also ==
- Private Life (disambiguation)
