= Social network (disambiguation) =

A social network is a theoretical concept in the social sciences, particularly sociology and anthropology, referring to a social structure made up of individuals or organizations.

Social network may also refer to:

== Business ==
- Business networking, an activity in which groups of like-minded businesspeople recognize, create, or act upon business opportunities
- Enterprise social networking, focuses on the use of online social networks or social relations among people who share business interests and/or activities
- Professional network service, a type of social network service that is focused solely on interactions and relationships of a business nature

== Internet ==
- Distributed social network, a collection of social networking services that communicate with each other through a common protocol
- List of social networking websites, major active social networking websites (excluding dating websites)
- Social media, a new medium for social interaction, based on social networking service
- Social media marketing, the use of social media platforms and websites to promote a product or service
- Social network aggregation, the process of collecting content from multiple social networking services
- Social network automation, tools that are used to semi/automate the process of posting content to social networking and social bookmarking websites
- Social networking service, services which act as online sites to connect people with similar interests
- Social-network game, online games where many people can play at once

== Other uses ==
- The Social Network, a 2010 biographical drama film
  - The Social Network (soundtrack), a soundtrack album from the film

== See also ==
- Social networking (disambiguation)
