= Living =

Living or The Living may refer to:

== Common meanings ==
- Life, a condition that distinguishes organisms from inorganic objects and dead organisms
  - Living species, one that is not extinct
- Personal life, the course of an individual human's life
- Living (Christianity) or benefice, in canon law, a position in a church that has attached to it a source of income
- A "living", a career or chosen path of labour by which workers earn money to subsist

== Music ==
- Living (Paddy Casey album) or the title song, "Livin'", 2003
- Living (Judy Collins album), 1971
- Living 2001–2002, an album by the John Butler Trio, 2003
- Living (EP) or the title song, by Josephine Collective, 2007
- "Living" (song), by Dierks Bentley, 2019
- The Living, early 1980's Seattle punk rock band featuring Duff McKagan

== Television and film ==
- Living (1954 TV program), a 1954–1955 Canadian informational program
- Living (2007 TV program), a 2007–2009 group of regional Canadian lifestyle programs
- Living (New Zealand TV channel), a New Zealand television station
- Living (UK TV channel), now Sky Witness, a British pay TV channel
  - Living2, later Real Lives, a defunct sister channel
- Living (2012 film), a 2012 Russian drama film
- Living (2022 film), British film remake of Akira Kurosawa's Ikiru
- Living (2023 TV series), a 2023 Taiwanese television series
- The Living (film), a 2014 American drama film

== Other ==
- Living (Christianity), an ecclesiastical patronage arrangement once allowed by the Anglican Church
- Living (novel), a 1929 novel by Henry Green
- The Living (novel), a 1992 novel by Annie Dillard
- Martha Stewart Living, a magazine and a defunct television program

== See also ==
- Biological material (disambiguation)
- Human condition
- Human life (disambiguation)
- Life (disambiguation)
- Live (disambiguation)
- Lives (disambiguation)
- Lively (disambiguation)
- Living wage, a minimum hourly wage
- Livings, a surname
- Lyfing
- Organic (disambiguation)
- Standard of living
