= Alive (magazine) =

Canadian health and wellness magazine

- February 2012 cover
- Editor-in-Chief: Tracy Peternell
- Categories: Health and wellness
- Frequency: Monthly
- Circulation: 200,000 per month
- Publisher: Ryan Benn
- Founded: 1975
- Company: Alive Publishing Group Inc.
- Country: Canada
- Based in: Richmond, British Columbia
- Language: English
- Website: alive.com
- ISSN: 0228-586X

alive is a monthly Canadian natural health and wellness magazine. The magazine provides readers with information on leading healthy lifestyles. Topics that it covers include natural health, organics, fitness, beauty, nutrition, holistic healing, emotional health and sustainability. The headquarters of the magazine are in Richmond, British Columbia. alive is distributed in Canadian health retailers and can be purchased through personal subscriptions.

== History ==
The magazine was started in Vancouver in 1975 by Canadian Health Reform Products for the Canadian Health Food Association. It is published by Alive Publishing Group Inc. Notable contributors include William E. Rees and David Suzuki.

In June 2008, Masthead Online reported that alive ranked 31st in revenues of all Canadian magazines, and had a readership (according to the Print Measurement Bureau) of 562,000.
