= Livings =

Livings is a surname of English origin. People with that name include:

- Henry Livings (1929–1998), English playwright and screenwriter
- Martin Livings (born 1970), Australian author
- Nate Livings (born 1982), American football guard

== See also ==
- Hard Livings (gang), Cape Town, South Africa
- Living (disambiguation)
