= Social (disambiguation) =

Social refers to the interaction of people and other organisms with each other, and to their collective co-existence.

Social may also refer to:

- The Social (Irish TV series), fronted by Craig Doyle
- The Social (talk show), a Canadian daytime television talk show
- The Social, London, a music and literary event venue owned by Heavenly Records
- Social: Why Our Brains Are Wired to Connect (2013), a book about social cognitive neuroscience by Matthew Lieberman
- The Social, a venue run by the Beacham Theatre in Orlando, Florida
- A party or other social event
- .social, an Internet top-level domain

== See also ==
- Social activity (disambiguation)
- Social network (disambiguation)
- Society (disambiguation)
