= Lively (surname) =

Lively is an English surname. Notable people with the surname include:

- Adam Lively (born 1961), British novelist
- Ben Lively (born 1992), American baseball player
- Blake Lively (born 1987 as Blake Ellender Brown), American actress
- Bob Lively (1923–1994), American jazz saxophonist
- Buddy Lively (1925–2015), American baseball player
- Charles Lively (athlete) (1893–1971), British athlete
- Charles Lively (labor spy) (1887–1962), American labor spy
- David Lively (born 1953), American classical pianist
- Dereck Lively II (born 2004), American basketball player
- Donald Lively, American lawyer
- Edward Lively (1545–1605), English linguist and biblical scholar
- Eric Lively (born 1981 as Eric Lawrence Brown), American actor
- Ernie Lively (1947–2021, born as Ernest Wilson Brown, Jr.), American actor
- Frank Lively (1864–1947), justice of the Supreme Court of Appeals of West Virginia
- Gerry Lively, American cinematographer and film director
- Jack Lively (1885–1967), American baseball player
- Jason Lively (born 1968), American actor
- John Lively (politician) (born 1946), American politician
- Katherine Allen Lively, American pianist and writer
- Lori Lively (born 1966), American actress
- Mitch Lively (born 1985), American baseball player
- Penelope Lively (born 1933 as Penelope Low), British writer
- Pierce Lively (1921–2016), American judge
- Robert Lively (screenwriter) (died 1943), American screenwriter and songwriter
- Robert M. Lively (1855–1929), American politician
- Robyn Lively (born 1972), American actress
- Scott Lively (born 1957), American author, attorney and anti-LGBT activist
- Shannon Lively (born 1992), Australian actor
- Zack Lively (born 1987), American actor
