= Before You Leap =

2006 autobiography of Kermit the Frog

- Author: Kermit the Frog
- Language: English
- Genre: Self-help
- Published: September 5, 2006
- Publication place: United States
- Media type: Print (Hardback)
- Pages: 224 pp
- ISBN: 9780696232329
- OCLC: 71248294

Before You Leap is the autobiography published under the name of the Muppet character Kermit the Frog. It was released by Meredith Books in September 2006.

Steve Whitmire performed Kermit on CBS News in January 2007 to discuss the book's themes. The book was also mentioned in a 2014 episode of The Tonight Show Starring Jimmy Fallon featuring Kermit.

== Plot ==
The book is written as a follow-up to a 2005 book titled It's Not Easy Being Green and contains references to Kermit's song "Bein' Green". The memoir begins with Kermit's beginnings as one of over 2,000 tadpole children; the first chapter retcons the film Kermit's Swamp Years in many ways by reimagining the character's childhood. The first part of the book tells a fictionalized account of how the Muppets began. Kermit meets Jim Henson in Washington, D.C. and stars in the first television program to feature the character, Sam and Friends. He moves to New York and mentions Rowlf the Dog's appearances on The Jimmy Dean Show, which contributed to the Muppets' early success. Kermit gets a job on Sesame Street, which leads to The Muppet Show and multiple feature films. Each new job for Kermit is described as a personal accomplishment, and these descriptions include accounts of Kermit's early interactions with characters such as Miss Piggy, Fozzie Bear, and Gonzo. The second part of the book involves Kermit's own take on popular self-help lessons. This final section includes many examples of life lessons from other Muppet characters, in addition to interruptions from the others who want to speak for themselves.
