= Sam and Friends =

1950s Washington DC puppet show

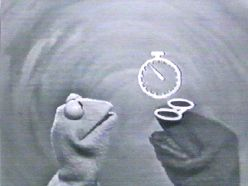
- Kermit (left) and Harry the Hipster (right) in the "Visual Thinking" sketch.
- Created by: Jim Henson; Jane Henson
- Starring: Jim Henson; Jane Henson; Bob Payne; Jerry Juhl
- Country of origin: United States
- No. of episodes: 400+

Production
- Running time: 3–5 minutes per sketch

Original release
- Network: WRC-TV
- Release: May 9, 1955 – December 15, 1961

Sam and Friends is an American live-action and puppet sketch comedy television series and a lead-in to The Tonight Show created by puppeteers Jane Nebel and Jim Henson, who later married. It marks the debut of The Muppets franchise, particularly Kermit the Frog.

The show aired live twice daily as a local series in Washington, D.C., on WRC-TV in black and white, and later color, on weeknights from May 9, 1955, to December 15, 1961. However, due to network budget issues, most of the original episodes were never preserved to film/kinescope and are considered lost.

A few of the show's surviving episodes can be viewed at the Paley Center for Media, but many can also be found on video websites like YouTube, such as those digitally archived by the Jim Henson Company. Some have also been documented by either the Henson Archives or newspaper articles published while the show was still on air.

== Plot ==
The series centers around Sam, a bald-headed, big-eared man who escaped the harshness of everyday life with the help of abstract friends that he created based on parts of his life. His friends included Yorick, Professor Madcliffe, Chicken Liver, Harry the Hipster, and Kermit.

Early in its run, the show mostly featured the puppets lip-syncing to popular songs of the day (if the song was by a female performer, the puppet would wear a wig while singing). Later, formal sketches were drawn up, many spoofing well-known television shows at the time, including the series which followed Sam and Friends in the Washington market, The Huntley–Brinkley Report.

A popular early sketch that was used often in subsequent Henson productions was "Glow-Worm", in which a character, often Kermit, would nibble on what looked like a worm, but would ultimately turn out to be the tongue or nose of the monster Big V, who would devour him.

Bob Payne once substituted for Jim Henson while he was in Europe. Jerry Juhl also worked on the show toward the end of its run where he substituted for Jane Henson. Starting in 1959, advertisements for Esskay Meats would appear at the end of the show, as well as Wilkins Coffee (the latter featured two Muppets created exclusively for the spots, Wilkins and Wontkins).

While Payne, Juhl, and Jane Henson all puppeteered in the series alongside him, Jim Henson provided all of the voices himself (unless the voices were taken from a record).

== Broadcast time ==
Network	Release date	Broadcast time	Ref
WRC-TV	May 9, 1955 – December 15, 1961	Mon - Fri 23:30 - 23:35	

== Characters ==
- Sam (performed by Jim Henson) – A bald-headed man who is the main character. Only footage of him lip-syncing to a song currently survives. His head was made from papier-mâché.
- Kermit (performed by Jim Henson) – A lizard-like creature. He was prominently featured in many sketches that led him to popularity, though he would not be referred to as a frog until a decade later.
- Harry the Hipster (performed by Jim Henson) – A beatnik black sock puppet. Harry was one of the first Muppets designed and built by Jim Henson.
- Yorick (performed by Jim Henson) – A voracious puppet that resembled a rock head. Yorick has been known for appearing with supporting Muppets, whom he would attempt to eat. His puppet was made of papier-mâché with a tube in his mouth that allowed him to swallow things.
- Professor Madcliffe (performed by Jim Henson) – A tall-headed professor with big eyes and a mustache. He had a loud and energetic personality. He made most of his appearances in commercials.
- Chicken Liver (performed by Jim Henson) – A humanoid character with a tall head and a big nose. He has been described as "a dramatic storyteller", and believed that the show lacked culture.
- Hank and Frank – Two bald humanoids that served as the show's bit players. They took on the roles of Chet Huntley and David Brinkley in a spoof interview with Kermit.
- Mushmellon – A small yellow monster with a permanent grimace. He was a favorite among younger audiences.
- Icky Gunk – A green snake sporting a pair of arms.
- Henrietta (performed by Jerry Juhl) – A pink female creature of indeterminable species.
- Moldy Hay – A humanoid character with orange-red skin, a big nose, and hair over his eyes.
- Omar (performed by Jim Henson) – A beaked humanoid with a papier-mâché face. He was described as "the nomadic type".
- Pierre the French Rat (performed by Jim Henson) – A French rat. He was one of Jim Henson's first puppets built and was embodied as a puppet made from plastic wood.
- Bernice (performed by Bob Payne) - A female humanoid.

== Cast ==
Sam and Friends cast
Actor	Role
Jim Henson	Sam; Harry the Hipster; Kermit; Chicken Liver; Omar; Professor Madcliffe; Yorick; Pierre the French Rat; Others
Jane Henson	Others
Jerry Juhl	Henrietta; Others
Bob Payne	Bernice; Others

== Episodes ==
=== Surviving episodes ===
- Powder-Burn (August 20, 1959): A pun-filled Gunsmoke parody with Marshall Dilly (Chicken Liver) preparing for a showdown with Black Bart (Yorick) which results in a game of chess.
- Poison to Poison (October 29, 1959): Lip-synching to the Spike Jones track "Poisen to Poisen", Harry the Hipster (as "Ed Burrow") interviews Chicken Liver (as Alfred Hitchcock) in his rather horrifying home.
- The Westerners (circa November 1960): Lip-synching to a recording of Bob and Ray's act The Westerners, Kermit and Chicken Liver play two cowboys who are having a little trouble getting off their horses.
- Huntley and Brinkley (January 6, 1961): In a parody of The Huntley-Brinkley Report, Kermit hosts an interview with NBC News anchormen Chet Huntley and David Brinkley (Hank and Frank).
- Visual Thinking (circa April 1961): In a mix of puppetry and animation, Harry demonstrates the Art of Visual Thinking to Kermit—and what it does to you once it gets out of control.
- Weather Warehouse (September 29, 1961): Harry demonstrates to a skeptical Kermit his new business for selling weather, and gives him a tour of the warehouse.
- Chef Omar (November 13, 1961): Omar prepares a chef salad, which blows up in his face when he serves it flaming.
- Last Sam Show (December 15, 1961): Kermit and Harry sing a song about the show's sponsor, Esskay Meats, then Kermit lip-syncs to Bob Gibson's recording of "I Come for to Sing". After both songs, Kermit discusses the end of the series with Harry—who blows up all the scenery and equipment since they won't need it anymore.

=== Episode list ===
Title	Plot	Date transcr./ recorded	Date broadcast	Status
=== Muppets First Appearance ===
Tweedle Dee	Jim Henson and Jane Nebel had used the song for The Muppets' first appearance on WRC-TV's Afternoon, performing two bird puppets (that look like Yorick and Hank) lip-synching to the Georgia Gibbs recording; whether this song was also lip-synced on Sam and Friends is unknown.		Mar 7, 1955	Lost, image and audio exist.
=== Season 1 - Part 1 (Sam and Friends) ===
First Sam Show	Eleven confirmed songs were transcribed before the series premiered on May 9, 1955, so it remains a mystery which one of these songs the premiere episode used.		May 9, 1955	Lost.
Meet Me in St. Louis		Jan 2, 1955		Lost, audio exists.
Daisy Bell (A Bicycle Built for Two)		Jan 2, 1955		Lost, audio exists.
A Bird in a Gilded Cage		Jan 2, 1955		Lost, audio exists.
Etiquette Blues	1st performance.	Jan 2, 1955		Lost, audio exists.
Where Did You Get That Name?		Jan 2, 1955		Lost, audio exists.
I'll Remember		May 5, 1955		Lost, audio exists.
News of the World		May 5, 1955		Lost, audio exists.
What Did He Say? (The Mumble Song)	1st performance. This version, performed by The Charioteers, is the first of two different songs with similar titles (both involving a person whose incomprehensible dialogue can't be understood) used on the show. This is the version used in most performances of the song on Sam and Friends.	May 5, 1955		Lost, audio exists.
Donkey Tango		May 5, 1955		Lost, audio exists.
Salt	1st performance.	May 5, 1955		Lost, audio exists.
George Washington, Abraham Lincoln, Ulysses S. Robert E. Lee		May 12, 1955		Lost, audio exists.
The Preacher and the Bear		May 12, 1955		Lost, audio exists.
Eating Goober Peas		May 12, 1955		Lost, audio exists.
The Guy with the Voodoo!		May 19, 1955		Lost, audio exists.
Open the Door, Richard		May 19, 1955		Lost, audio exists.
A Four-Legged Friend	1st performance.	Jun 9, 1955		Lost, audio exists.
Morris		Jun 9, 1955		Lost, audio exists.
He's a Tramp		Jun 9, 1955		Lost, audio exists.
Empty Saddles		Jun 9, 1955		Lost, audio exists.
Woodman, Woodman, Spare That Tree		Jun 23, 1955		Lost, audio exists.
You Go Your Way (And I'll Go Crazy)		Jun 23, 1955		Lost, audio exists.
She Never Left the Table		Jun 23, 1955		Lost, audio exists.
The Day I Read a Book		Jun 23, 1955		Lost, audio exists.
Tongue Twisters		Jun 30, 1955		Lost, audio exists.
Oooh Looka There, Ain't She Pretty?		Jun 30, 1955		Lost, audio exists.
Little Man You've Had a Busy Day		Jun 30, 1955		Lost, audio exists.
I'll Pay as I Go		Jun 30, 1955		Lost, audio exists.
Dr. Geek		Jun 30, 1955		Lost, audio exists.
Tennessee Hillbilly Ghost		Jun 30, 1955		Lost, audio exists.
I Went to Your Wedding	1st performance.	Jul 11, 1955		Lost, audio exists.
The Natives Are Restless Tonight		Jul 14, 1955		Lost, audio exists.
My Gal Sal		Jul 14, 1955		Lost, audio exists.
The Corn Keeps A-Growin'		Jul 14, 1955		Lost, audio exists.
The Thing	1st performance.	Jul 14, 1955		Lost, audio exists.
What Happened to the Hair (On the Head of the Man I Love?)		Jul 14, 1955		Lost, audio exists.
Once in Love with Amy		Jul 21, 1955		Lost, audio exists.
Minnie the Mermaid		Jul 21, 1955		Lost, audio exists.
Dufo (What a Crazy Guy)	1st performance.	Jul 21, 1955		Lost, audio exists.
It's a Sin to Tell a Lie		Jul 21, 1955		Lost, audio exists.
Such a Night		Aug 4, 1955		Lost, audio exists.
Down the Road Apiece		Aug 4, 1955		Lost, audio exists.
Wayfaring Stranger (traditional) / Woolie Boogie Bee		Aug 4, 1955		Lost, audio exists.
You Can't Do Wrong Doin' Right		Aug 4, 1955		Lost, audio exists.
Close the Door		Aug 11, 1955		Lost, audio exists.
I Ain't Gonna Give Nobody None O' This Jelly Roll		Aug 11, 1955		Lost, audio exists.
The Sad Cowboy		Aug 11, 1955		Lost, audio exists.
The Telephone No Ring		Aug 11, 1955		Lost, audio exists.
Dig-Dig-Dig Dig for Your Dinner		Aug 11, 1955		Lost, audio exists.
Possibilities		Aug 11, 1955		Lost, audio exists.
Sunday Driving		Aug 18, 1955		Lost, audio exists.
I'm a Little Busybody		Aug 18, 1955		Lost, audio exists.
The Musicians	1st performance.	Aug 18, 1955		Lost, audio exists.
I Cried for You		Aug 18, 1955		Lost, audio exists.
Ugly Chile (You're Some Pretty Doll)		Aug 19, 1955		Lost, audio exists.
It's a Quiet Town	The first performance, lip-syncing to "It's a Quiet Town" by Danny Kaye and the Andrews Sisters, features Kermit as Kaye's sheriff character with Hank and Frank in drag as the Andrews Sisters. This performance from 1955 (of which a color photo survives) is the first known sketch chronologically in which Kermit is definitively featured, following his first appearance on Afternoon in March 1955.	Aug 19, 1955		Lost, audio and image exist.
Jack and the Beanstalk (Bebop's Fable)		Aug 25, 1955		Lost, audio exists.
Old, Old Vienna		Aug 25, 1955		Lost, audio exists.
How Do'ye Do and Shake Hands	1st performance.	Aug 25, 1955		Lost, audio exists.
There Is a Tavern in the Town		Aug 25, 1955		Lost, audio exists.
I've Got You Under My Skin	1st performance.	Sep 1, 1955		Lost, audio exists.
I Can't Carry a Tune		Sep 1, 1955		Lost, audio exists.
I'm So Right Tonight		Sep 1, 1955		Lost, audio exists.
The Bowery		Sep 1, 1955		Lost, audio exists.
The Bird on Nellie's Hat		Sep 1, 1955		Lost, audio exists.
She May Have Seen Better Days		Sep 1, 1955		Lost, audio exists.
I Know an Old Lady		Sep 14, 1955		Lost, audio exists.
Goofus (theme for Sam and Friends)	Surviving acetate recording's label states the tune was a "theme for Sam and Friends", hinting it was used solely for intro sequences and incidental underscore music, instead of musical performances in the episodes.	Sep 14, 1955		Audio exists, visual Sam and Friends intro sequences lost.
Never Hit Your Grandma with a Shovel (Use an Ax Instead)		Sep 15, 1955		Lost, audio exists.
By the Light of the Silvery Moon		Sep 15, 1955		Lost, audio exists.
Don't Start Courtin' in a Hot Rod		Sep 15, 1955		Lost, audio exists.
The Ugly Duckling		Sep 15, 1955		Lost, audio exists.
The Inch Worm	Kermit lip-syncs to a Danny Kaye recording of "The Inch Worm" in front of a schoolhouse with silhouetted children in the window. 1st performance.	Sep 15, 1955		Lost, audio and image exist.
Murder, He Says		Sep 22, 1955		Lost, audio exists.
Smoke! Smoke! Smoke! (That Cigarette)		Sep 22, 1955		Lost, audio exists.
The Handout Song (There's a Handout on Panhandle Hill)		Sep 22, 1955		Lost, audio exists.
Sipping Cider Through a Straw		Sep 22, 1955		Lost, audio exists.
A Couple of Swells		Sep 29, 1955		Lost, audio exists.
Can't Stop Talking		Sep 29, 1955		Lost, audio exists.
No Ring on Her Finger		Sep 29, 1955		Lost, audio exists.
The Man Who Broke the Bank at Monte Carlo		Sep 29, 1955		Lost, audio exists.
She Is More to Be Pitied Than Censured		Sep 29, 1955		Lost, audio exists.
Wait ‘till the Sun Shines, Nellie		Sep 29, 1955		Lost, audio exists.
=== Season 1 - Part 2 (Afternoon) ===
Lazy River		Oct 13, 1955		Lost, audio exists.
Silas Lee		Oct 13, 1955		Lost, audio exists.
The Doughnut Song		Oct 13, 1955		Lost, audio exists.
The Yellow Rose of Texas	Kermit lip-syncs to a Stan Freberg recording of "The Yellow Rose of Texas" and deals with an out-of-control drummer. 1st performance.	Oct 19, 1955		The Steve Allen Show performance from April 21, 1957 exists in Henson storage and also exists online, Sam and Friends broadcast version lost.
Sixteen Tons		Nov 8, 1955		Lost, audio exists.
Atchoo (The Sneezing Record)		Nov 8, 1955		Lost, audio exists.
You Laughed When I Cried Over You (The Laughing Record)		Nov 8, 1955		Lost, audio exists.
After the Ball		Nov 8, 1955		Lost, audio exists.
Bill Bailey, Won't You Please Come Home		Nov 8, 1955		Lost, audio exists.
The Fountain in the Park		Nov 8, 1955		Lost, audio exists.
Just a Bum (Ma Pomme)		Nov 10, 1955		Lost, audio exists.
Place Pigalle		Nov 10, 1955		Lost, audio exists.
Valentine		Nov 10, 1955		Lost, audio exists.
Barnacle Bill the Sailor	1st performance.	Nov 10, 1955		Lost, audio exists.
Mad Dogs and Englishmen		Nov 14, 1955		Lost, audio exists.
The Old Chimney	The first Christmas-themed Muppet performance.	Dec 13, 1955		Lost, audio exists.
Santy's Movin' On		Dec 13, 1955		Lost, audio exists.
Santa Brought Me Choo Choo Trains (But Daddy's Having Fun)		Dec 13, 1955		Lost, audio exists.
Santa Claus Looks Like My Daddy		Dec 13, 1955		Lost, audio exists.
I Tant Wait Till Quithmuth		Dec 13, 1955		Lost, audio exists.
Christmas Chopsticks		Dec 13, 1955		Lost, audio exists.
The Little Fiddle (Symphony for Unstrung Tongue)		Dec 23, 1955		Lost, audio exists.
Lucky Pierre		Dec 23, 1955		Lost, audio exists.
Cry Me a River	Kermeena (played by Kermit) lip-syncs to a Julie London recording of the song. This sketch is shot through a fish-filled aquarium.	Dec 23, 1955		Lost, audio exists.
When You See a Pretty Girl		Dec 23, 1955		Lost, audio exists.
Sifting, Whimpering Sands		Dec 23, 1955		Lost, audio exists.
They Laid Him in the Ground		Dec 23, 1955		Lost, audio exists.
The King's New Clothes	1st performance.	Dec 23, 1955		Lost, audio exists.
This is a Wife? (What is a Wife?)		Jan 8, 1956		Lost, audio exists.
A Little Beauty		Jan 8, 1956		Lost, audio exists.
The Trouble with Harry	1st performance.	Jan 8, 1956		Lost, audio exists.
Old MacDonald Had a Farm	1st performance.	Jan 8, 1956		Lost, audio exists.
Outfox the Fox		Jan 16, 1956		Lost, audio exists.
Too Young		Jan 16, 1956		Lost, audio exists.
The Book Was So Much Better Than the Picture		Feb 27, 1956		Lost, audio exists.
Listen to the Gooney Bird		Mar 12, 1956		Lost, audio exists.
Good Ol' Mountain Dew		Mar 12, 1956		Lost, audio exists.
Interview with Shorty Petterstein		Apr 19, 1956		Lost, audio exists.
=== Footlight Theater season ===
The Muppets debut on Footlight Theater	The Muppets become part of Footlight Theater with Paul Arnold on this day. There is no surviving info on what specific content this broadcast features, however.		May 14, 1956	Lost.
Louis Looselid: Private Eye	This routine written specifically for the show featured Kermit as Detective Louise Looselid, attempting to solve the mysterious disappearance of Lord Farthingham. The story of Lord Farthingham's disappearance was told in two parts, airing on sequential days. This is the only known Louis Looselid adventure confirmed to have been presented. As this predated Jim Henson's performances of vocals, the voices on this recording (especially Kermit's) were most likely provided by Paul Arnold.	rec. June 25, 1956		Lost, audio exists.
Algernon J. Cumquatt Jokes about Republicans and Indigestion	In one bit, ace Muppet newscaster Algernon J. Cumquatt (played by possibly Omar) reports the following: "The Democratic Digest, that periodical that is partial to the Democratic Party, said that the Republicans are just like cannibals... they're allowing big business to swallow up the little ones at a dangerous rate... seems that indigestion is chronic with the Republicans."		est. Jul 01, 1956	Lost, image exists.
Standing on the Corner	1st performance.	Jul 30, 1956		Lost, audio exists.
Silly Signs Song		Jul 30, 1956		Lost, audio exists.
Oh Boy! (Ain't It Great to Be Crazy)		Jul 30, 1956		Lost, audio exists.
Alfred the Airsick Eagle		Jul 30, 1956		Lost, audio exists.
Steamboat Bill		Aug 6, 1956		Lost, audio exists.
The Band Played On		Aug 6, 1956		Lost, audio exists.
Goodbye My Lover, Goodbye		Aug 6, 1956		Lost, audio exists.
You're Not the Only Pebble on the Beach		Aug 6, 1956		Lost, audio exists.
Be My Guest		Aug 6, 1956		Lost, audio exists.
Pardners		Aug 6, 1956		Lost, audio exists.
Gramps Reports on San Francisco Events	Gramps (played by Sam), a well-seasoned reporter who was selected on a basis of seniority since he has been covering these affairs since Lincoln's nomination, reports amusing highlights and incidents that occurred in San Francisco at the time. Paul Arnold was absent from this week of broadcasts as he couldn't make it to the Golden Gate city, likely due to schedule conflicts.		est. Aug 19, 1956	Lost.
There's a New Sound	1st performance. A macabre puppet made from an actual skull of a squirrel lip-syncs to a recording of the terrible song "There's a New Sound", just to annoy the audience. Judging by the squirrel skull puppet seen in the surviving set photos taking place on the Footlight Theater set (with the copyright date saying 1956), it is possible that this song was first performed during the Footlight Theater season of the show.		1956 (date unknown)	Lost, behind-the-scenes photos exist.
=== Season 2 (Sam and Friends with Paul Arnold) ===
(unknown episode title)	Earliest known premiere episode of this incarnation of Sam and Friends.		Sept 10, 1956	Lost.
I Just Goofed	1st performance.	Nov 21, 1956		Lost, audio exists.
Egghead		Dec 5, 1956		Lost, audio exists.
While the Lights are Low		Dec 5, 1956		Lost, audio exists.
Erbert		Dec 31, 1956		Lost, audio exists.
Sam's Song (The Happy Tune)		Jan 2, 1957		Lost, audio exists.
The Party's Over		Jan 2, 1957		Lost, audio exists.
Dancing Chandelier		Jan 2, 1957		Lost, audio exists.
The Ballad of Roger Boom	1st performance.	Jan 2, 1957		Lost, audio exists.
The Ballad of Sir Lancelot		Jan 2, 1957		Lost, audio exists.
Calico Pie		Jan 18, 1957		Lost, audio exists.
Green Door		Jan 18, 1957		Lost, audio exists.
What Did He Say? (The Mumble Song) (alt. ver.)	A different song with a similar title, performed by Deep River Boys, is used for this episode. Further performances switch back to using The Charioteers' version.	Jan 18, 1957		Lost, audio exists.
The Ballad of Roger Boom	2nd performance.	Jan 18, 1957		Lost, audio exists.
Hold 'em Joe		Jan 29, 1957		Lost, audio exists.
I Dreamed		Jan 29, 1957		Lost, audio exists.
Mama from the Train (Throw Mama Down the Stairs Her Hat of Blue)		Jan 29, 1957		Lost, audio exists.
Goodnight Ladies	1st performance.	Jan 29, 1957		Lost, audio exists.
The Maladjusted Jester	1st performance.	Feb 7, 1957		Lost, audio exists.
Pum-Pa-Lum (The Bad Donkey)		Feb 7, 1957		Lost, audio exists.
Old King Cole		Feb 7, 1957		Lost, audio exists.
Three Blind Mice		Feb 7, 1957		Lost, audio exists.
M.T.A. (The Boston Subway Song)	1st performance.	Feb 21, 1957		Lost, audio exists.
Round and Round		Feb 21, 1957		Lost, audio exists.
Stone Cold Dead in the Market (He Had It Coming)		Feb 21, 1957		Lost, audio exists.
Sam and Friends Meet Milbourne Christopher	Milbourne Christopher, one of the magical stars of the "Festival of Magic", makes a guest appearance on this show.		est. Mar 1957	Lost.
The House		Apr 1, 1957		Lost, audio exists.
The Cricket Song		Apr 1, 1957		Lost, audio exists.
Dreamers' Bay		Apr 1, 1957		Lost, audio exists.
I'm Popeye the Sailor Man		Apr 1, 1957		Lost, audio exists.
Stan Freberg Demands Credit	Stan Freberg himself pops his head into frame and criticizes the Muppets for using his records without giving him credit. Kermit says "here's a little credit" and pounds him back out of frame with a mallet.		Apr 8, 1957	Lost, existence confirmed from Stan Freberg's memory.
Paul's Magic Tricks (intro) / The Maladjusted Jester / Paul's Magic Tricks (outro)	Paul Arnold discusses with Sam that he is disappointed about the Sam and Friends gang not getting to perform in an episode of NBC's Producers' Showcase, "Festival of Magic", and thinks sawing Sam in half would've gotten them booked there. After thinking of a new trick, Paul decides to perform an act of using an axe on Sam, prompting the latter to disappear quickly. / 2nd performance of "The Maladjusted Jester". / Paul suggests the bullet catch as another magic track he could think of, but no one is available to try it.		May 27, 1957	Lost, script exists for each segment.
S-S-S'Wonderful (Hector the Nearsighted Rattlesnake)	1st performance.	Jul 24, 1957		Lost, audio exists.
Ivy League	1st performance.	Jul 24, 1957		Lost, audio exists.
Gotta Get to Your House	1st performance.	Jul 24, 1957		Lost, audio exists.
Dragnet Goes to Kindergarten	1st performance.	Jul 24, 1957		Lost, audio exists.
Sam and Friends Meet Bob Hope	Following his appearances with the Muppets on Footlight Theater, future Muppet Show guest star Bob Hope came to WRC-TV and reportedly made a guest appearance on this show.		Aug 14, 1957	Broadcast unconfirmed due to there being no script or recording to document it, images exist.
Paul Arnold's Watch (part 1) (cold open/intro) / I Just Goofed / Paul Arnold's Watch (part 1) (cont.) / The Maladjusted Jester	Paul, wondering if Professor Madcliffe was asking to borrow a watch spring, loans his watch to Sam, who then loans it to Madcliffe. Paul Arnold then sings a song. / 2nd performance of "I Just Goofed", lip-synced by Mushmellon. / Madcliffe tells Paul that his watch broke apart after he removed the back lid, then agrees to repair the watch. / 3rd performance of "The Maladjusted Jester", lip-synced by Kermit.		Aug 19, 1957	Lost, script exists for each segment.
Paul Arnold's Watch (part 2) (cold open/intro) / Zip Zip / Paul Arnold's Watch (part 2) (cont.)	Paul isn't happy with an alarm dock strapped to his wrist as a replacement watch. After the opening theme, Paul continues talking before he sings a song. / Muppets lip-sync to The Diamonds recording of "Zip Zip". / Paul asks Madcliffe how long it will take to repair his watch. Madcliffe is upset with Paul's complaints about the watch, and tells him he's not concerned about Paul's problems right now since he has a watch to fix.		Aug 20, 1957	Lost, script exists for each segment.
Person to Person		Aug 28, 1957		Lost, audio exists.
The Drummer and the Cook		Aug 28, 1957		Lost, audio exists.
The Man on the Flying Trapeze	1st performance.	Aug 28, 1957		Lost, audio exists.
It's Magic	1st performance.	Aug 28, 1957		Lost, audio exists.
Old Man Atom		Jan 11, 1958		Lost, audio exists.
The Green-Eyed Dragon		Jan 14, 1958		Lost, audio exists.
Silhouettes		Jan 29, 1958		Lost, audio exists.
How Do'ye Do and Shake Hands	2nd performance.	Jan 29, 1958		Lost, audio exists.
Income Tax		Apr 15, 1958		Lost, audio exists.
Perfidia		Apr 15, 1958		Lost, audio exists.
=== Season 3 – Part 1 ===
The Country's in the Very Best of Hands	Transcribed 9 days shortly before Jim left for Europe; may have been performed on the show during his absence.	Jun 10, 1958		Lost, audio exists.
Salt	2nd performance.		est. Jul 1958	Lost, behind-the-scenes photo exists.
She's a Lady	1st performance.	Jul 28, 1958		Lost, audio exists.
Anything You Can Do (I Can Do Better)	1st performance.	Jul 28, 1958		Lost, audio exists.
The Musicians	2nd performance.	Jul 28, 1958		Lost, audio exists.
John Henry		Jul 28, 1958		Lost, audio exists.
This Ole World		Jul 28, 1958		Lost, audio exists.
Rock Island Line		Jul 28, 1958		Lost, audio exists.
Yosemite Sam	1st performance.	Jul 28, 1958		Lost, audio exists.
Life Gets Teejus Don't It	1st performance.	Jul 28, 1958		Lost, audio exists.
=== Season 3 – Part 2 ===
Elderly Man River	1st performance.	Aug 8, 1958		Lost, audio exists.
Jubilation T. Cornpone	1st performance.	Aug 13, 1958		Lost, audio exists.
None But the Lonely Heart		Aug 13, 1958		Lost, audio exists.
Etiquette Blues	2nd performance.	Aug 21, 1958		Lost, audio exists.
To Keep My Love Alive		Aug 21, 1958		Lost, audio exists.
Good Old 149		Sept 3 (year unknown)		Lost, audio exists.
Tschaikowsky (And Other Russians)	1st performance. Later performances are paired with "The Chipmunk Song" and sped up at Chipmunk-style speed.	Sept 3 (year unknown)		Lost, audio exists.
Abominable Snowman	1st performance.	Sept 8, 1958		Lost, audio exists.
Oh, Happy Day		Sept 8, 1958		Lost, audio exists.
The Peony Bush	1st performance.	Sept 18, 1958		Lost, audio exists.
Dinah	1st performance.	Sept 18, 1958		Lost, audio exists.
Ain't Nobody's Business But My Own		Sept 18, 1958		Lost, audio exists.
You Can't Hurt Me Now Cuz I'm Daid		Sept 18, 1958		Lost, audio exists.
There's a New Sound	2nd performance.	Sept 18, 1958		Lost, audio exists.
Drain Dweller	Harry announces a public service feature introducing correspondent Kermit, who interviews Orwell Filchmouth, a drain dweller living under a kitchen sink, discussing the dangers of his location. 1st performance. Earliest known surviving recording of Jim Henson voicing Kermit, Harry and other characters besides Professor Madcliffe.	rec. by Henson on Sept 19, 1958		Lost, audio exists.
Sincere		Sept 23, 1958		Lost, audio exists.
The Sadder-But-Wiser Girl		Sept 23, 1958		Lost, audio exists.
Lullaby of Bird Dog		Sept 24, 1958		Lost, audio exists.
Ghost Interview	Kermit conducts a live interview from Gabriel Park Memorial Cemetery with the ghost of Lord Randall Worthington.	rec. by Henson on Sept 26, 1958 (re-edited for length on Oct 20)		Lost, script and audio exist.
Kermit Interviews Professor Madcliffe	Kermit interviews Professor Madcliffe about his specialty—failure.	two different takes rec. by Henson on October 1 and 2, 1958		Lost, audio and image exist.
Pachalafaka	In the first performance, Moldy Hay lip-syncs to a recording of the song by Earl Brown.	Oct 20, 1958		Lost, audio and image exist.
G'wan Home, Your Mudder's Callin		Oct 20, 1958		Lost, audio exists.
Salt	3rd performance.	Nov 8, 1958		Lost, audio exists.
What Did He Say? (The Mumble Song)	2nd performance.	Nov 8, 1958		Lost, audio exists.
I Love Me (I'm Wild About Myself)		Nov 8, 1958		Lost, audio exists.
Song of the Sewer			Nov 24, 1958 (on In Our Town)	Lost, audio exists.
The Yellow Rose of Texas *	2nd performance. / Professor Madcliffe criticizes Moldy Hay for waving to friends during the program. Moldy explains he was acknowledging his mother, who is proud of their show for "such a rep-a-rep-a-rep-u-table company." Madcliffe clarifies the word "reputable" and Moldy defends his mother's knowledge about Esskay, claiming it's been around for over a hundred years.		Nov 24, 1958	Lost, audio exists.
The Musicians *	The show begins with Omar welcoming Baltimore to the Sam and Friends network. "Let's see, how many stations does that make now?" he asks to someone offscreen. "TWO!" shouts Professor Madcliffe. Omar then segues to the Muppets' 3rd performance of "The Musicians." / Moldy Hay reminds viewers that Thanksgiving is nearing, with Esskay Turkeys being the featured product. Kermit corrects Moldy Hay for mentioning a goose instead of their sponsor's turkey. Viewers are reminded that Esskay quality turkeys are clean, oven-ready, and come with giblets packed separately. This is the first Sam and Friends episode to be broadcast in Baltimore (where Esskay is based) on WBAL-TV.		Nov 25, 1958	Lost, audio exists.
I Know an Old Lady *	2nd performance. / Moldy Hay is very upset because his cousin Doozey May bought a turkey that is not an Esskay. When Kermit suggests he explain Esskay's benefits, Moldy refuses to talk to her and admits he hit her. Moldy then tells Sam that the "old lady" from the song was just like Doozey whom he was telling Kermit about.		Nov 26, 1958	Lost, audio exists.
The Inch Worm *	2nd performance. / Omar is wearing a pilgrim hat and Harry questions him about it. Omar explains he was chosen to deliver greetings. He wishes everyone a happy Thanksgiving on behalf of Esskay and their team.		Nov 27, 1958	Lost, audio exists.
The Ballad of Roger Boom *	3rd performance. / Harry sets up the commercial with an elaborate musical fanfare, then Kermit delivers a "message of pure joy": a pitch for Esskay Breakfast Links.		Nov 28, 1958	Lost, audio exists.
The Hunting Song * / Lullaby of Bird Dog	Muppets lip-sync to a Tom Lehrer recording of "The Hunting Song". / Kermit begins the commercial but is interrupted by Professor Madcliffe, who calls it off because the delivery of the commercials is getting sloppy. / Muppets lip-sync to a Homer and Jethro recording of "Lullaby of Bird Dog".		Dec 1, 1958	Lost, audio exists.
I've Grown Accustomed to Your Face *	Omar tries to make conversation: "Scrapple, anyone?" But Harry critiques his conversation starter. "Omar, dad, like, honk, you're for weirdsville." Harry explains that you start a day with scrapple, not a conversation. "Especially when it's Esskay Skrapple." / Kermit (performing as Kermeena) lip-syncs to the Rosemary Clooney recording of "I've Grown Accustomed to Your Face", singing to a small creature that is covered entirely by a piece of cloth with a face drawn on it. As Kermeena sings, the creature eats the mask off its own head, revealing itself to be the ever-hungry Yorick. Kermeena keeps singing while trying to fend off Yorick, who leers and starts munching on her limbs.		Dec 2, 1958	Lost, audio exists. The Steve Allen Show performance of "I've Grown Accustomed to Your Face" from November 4, 1956 exists in Henson storage and also exists online.
Looking at Numbers *	Kermit is trying to figure out a fun new way to promote Esskay quality. Harry offers a beatnik poem about Esskay: "Esskay! Quality quality quality quality—pure! Pure! Pure! Quality quality quality quality pure …" Kermit asks him about it, and Harry explains it's beatnik poetry. Kermit adds more to Harry's Beat message with details about Esskay. / Muppets lip-sync to Ken Nordine's "Looking at Numbers."		Dec 3, 1958	Lost, audio exists.
Down by the Old Mill Stream *	Omar presents a poem titled "Ode to an Esskay Sausage". After his poem ends with a mumble, Professor Madcliffe asks about the mumbled ending to his poem. Omar has an explanation: "Did you ever try to find a word that rhymes with sausage?" / The cast gathers for the song. A pitch pipe is blown for their opening note, and even though the Sam and Friends vocal group is off-pitch, they begin to lip-sync to Randy Van Horne Swing Choir's recording of "Down by the Old Mill Stream".		Dec 4, 1958	Lost, audio exists.
Beep Beep *	Muppets lip-sync to The Playmates' recording of "Beep Beep". / After a non-Henson recorded Esskay jingle, Kermit tells viewers to ask the head chef to make a pile of Esskay Sausages for breakfast if they feel tired in the morning. Moldy Hay recalls living on a farm and taking care of his father's cows.		Dec 5, 1958	Lost, audio exists.
Banana Boat (Day-O) *	2nd performance. / The commercial from November 26, 1958 reappears, except at the end of it, Kermit realizes, "Egad! We're late!" and a sped-up version of the Sam and Friends outro plays.		Dec 8, 1958	Lost, audio exists.
A Shine on Your Shoes	The version of "A Shine on Your Shoes" that Sam and Friends used is unknown, as the acetate is only exhibited at museums (either the MoMI gallery or the touring Henson exhibit) and is not feasible to remove from for examination of its contents.	Dec 9, 1958		Lost, audio exists.
Herman Horne on Hi-Fi	Muppets lip-sync to a recording of Stan Freberg's expert segment from his CBS radio program about the state-of-the-art audio equipment, despite more important priorities that women like to do.	Dec 9, 1958		Lost, audio exists.
Money *	Moldy Hay tells Sam he's been having deep philosophical thoughts lately, and asks Sam if he has thoughts like that. "Do you ever think about what you want to get out of life? For instance, do you want to be a genius? Or be famous? Or have a lot of girls? Now, you take Mushmellon over there… he knows what he wants out of life. He only wants one thing…" Moldy Hay segues to Mushmellion lip-syncing to a Mel Blanc recording of "Money". / The commercial from November 28, 1958 reappears, sans Harry's musical fanfare.		Dec 9, 1958	Lost, audio exists.
The Peony Bush *	Omar presents a peony bush and tells viewers that this is one that Kermit loves with all his heart. Kermit lip-syncs to the song. 2nd performance. / "The Sam and Friends Mystery Theater" features a drama titled "What Happened to Bacon for Breakfast?" Detective Omar states it was last seen on Sunday morning. Professor Madcliffe claims people deserve warm, energizing bacon instead of small, cold breakfasts. The commercial ends with Madcliffe enthusiastically promoting Esskay Bacon.		Dec 10, 1958	Lost, audio exists.
Open the Door, Richard *	Harry is feeling "gonesville" because he can't stop thinking about the Esskay quality message. Kermit reassures him that it's normal to think about the quality of Esskay products. Harry agrees but still feels overwhelmed. / Muppets lip-sync to The Charioteers recording of "Open the Door, Richard".		Dec 11, 1958	Lost, audio exists.
Nuttin' for Christmas *	The episode mostly doesn't involve Christmas, as Harry the Hipster asks the director for more room so he can introduce "a swinging little show called Sam and Friends." As the title card appears, Harry cues every portion of the theme in beatnik hep lingo ("Crazy.") Then after mentioning Esskay, he says "on with the gig." This leads to Stan Freberg's 1955 version of "Nuttin' for Christmas" (one of five versions which came out that same year), with Freberg playing a bratty child on Santa's naughty list, and then the burglar who comes in to rob the place (and split with the kid). / Moldy Hay is missing farm breakfasts. This gives Professor Madcliffe the opportunity to plug Esskay Hickory Smoked Bacon. Moldy Hay becomes so convinced that city folk need to buy more Esskay bacon that "it should be illegal not to enjoy it. I'll sue! Write my congressman! Someone get me a cheap lawyer!"		Dec 12, 1958	Lost, audio exists.
Maggie *	Characters lip-sync to a recording of the song by Stan Freberg with Cliffie Stone's Music. / Omar interviews Yorick, who has just eaten four Esskay Hams. Yorick's answers are mostly mumbled, but he clearly responds "Yes" when asked about tasting the difference Q-wal-ity makes.		Dec 15, 1958	Lost, audio exists.
Old, Old Vienna *	The opening logo is interrupted by Omar saying, "Once again, Sam and Friends is brought to you by Esskay." Muppets then lip-sync to "Old, Old Vienna". 2nd performance. / Harry presents a riddle: "What's bald, plump, and tender and makes your nose light up?" Moldy guesses it's his father. Harry reveals it's Esskay Oven Ready Turkey and describes it. Professor Madcliffe criticizes Harry for it and delivers a straight, impassioned pitch. Moldy then tells Harry that he did get the "bald, plump, tender" part but that doesn't make his nose light up, but Harry insists the smell of roasting will do it.		Dec 16, 1958	Lost, audio exists.
The Night Before Christmas *	Freberg is used again, this time his 1955 version of "The Night Before Christmas" (with child actress Babette Bain as his niece). / Professor Madcliffe making an Esskay Oven Ready Turkey manifest out of nowhere, while telling viewers to buy one for their Christmas dinners.		Dec 17, 1958	Lost, audio exists.
Wild Bill Hiccup *	1st performance. / Harry delivers a Beat-style commercial for Esskay's Oven Ready Turkeys: "They're gone on the gums, wet with the white meat, draggin' with the dark meat." Kermit translates: "Delicious. Lots of Moist white meat. Rich, man-sized drumsticks." Harry continues: "Swingin-est, wildest, in-est, most-est, gone, gone, gone."		Dec 18, 1958	Lost, audio exists.
It's Magic *	The program begins with a solemn announcement that tonight's show is one of a more mature and serious nature. This is followed by the Muppets doing a 2nd performance of "It's Magic". / Harry paints a portrait of a sandwich made of Esskay Fully Cooked Ham. Professor Madcliffe questions why Harry chose to paint instead of delivering the commercial and points out he didn't mention Esskay quality. Harry explains that someone said one good picture is worth a million words, especially with a "blabbermouth" like Madcliffe around. Due to a technical problem with transmitting audio or video during December 19, the episode was re-performed on Monday, December 22, adding in an ending with Harry explaining that the show may seem repetitious. "Leave us say that on Friday, the technicians discovered to their great dismay that chewing gum is not a good conductor of electricity. We hope that we'll be back tomorrow for Esskay—audio and video."		Dec 19, 1958 (rebroadcast on Dec 22)	Lost, audio exists.
Let Me In *	In the show's cold open, Moldy Hay reminds viewers that the Muppets will be making a guest appearance on "The Jack Paar Show" later in the evening and invites them to tune in at 11:30. When the program starts, Moldy begins reciting Shakespeare. Professor Madcliffe interrupts, telling him that Shakespeare is not appropriate for this show. Moldy then explains he was told to talk about ham and starts the commercial for Esskay ham. / Muppets lip-sync to a recording of "Let Me In" by Red Ingle and the Natural Seven.		Dec 23, 1958	Lost, audio exists.
The Chipmunk Song * / Tschaikowsky (And Other Russians)	For the Christmas Eve show, Omar wraps a single Esskay Sausage as a Christmas present, but Kermit says he's not thinking big enough. It should be a fully cooked ham or oven ready turkey. Omar just happens to be fond of Esskay Sausage, finally deciding to give a case of sausages. "The Chipmunk Song" follows (where Alvin wants a hula hoop almost as much as Omar wants sausage). / After the song, the Muppets segue into a sped-up Chipmunk-style version of Danny Kaye's "Tschaikowsky (And Other Russians)", and even the Sam and Friends outro is humorously sped up.		Dec 24, 1958	Lost, audio exists.
Carol of the Bells * / God Rest Ye Merry, Gentlemen	"Jingle Bells" plays for the opening titles, while Omar states that "Sam and Friends, on this Yuletide Day, is brought to you by Esskay." The record is "Carol of the Bells" performed by the Randolph Singers conducted by David Randolph (from their 1951 album Christmas Carols). This leads to the commercial and Moldy Hay, but instead of the usual jingle, they get an excerpt from Freberg's satire on holiday commercialism, "Green Christ$ma$" (released that month). The Jud Conlon Rhythmaires sing, "We wish you a merry Christmas/now please buy our beer!" Moldy Hay is irritated and threatens to quit, but Professor Madcliffe urges him to continue with the Christmas message: "All of us here, and all the people that make Esskay products, hope you've had a joyful day this day of all days." The show concludes with a second selection from the Randolph Singers album. "God Rest Ye Merry, Gentlemen."		Dec 25, 1958	Lost, audio exists.
Christmas Tree *	The day after the holiday, Omar fusses at Yorick for eating all the Esskay sausages, the turkey, platter, tablecloth, dishes and even all the ornaments on the tree (which they hoped to use next year). After the opening announcement, a thematic song follows, "Christmas Tree" from the Voices of Walter Schumann's 1955 album The Voices of Christmas. / The commercial is less seasonal, reused from December 10, 1958.		Dec 26, 1958	Lost, audio exists.
The Hat I Got for Christmas Is Too Beeg *	The commercial from December 4, 1958 reappears. / Muppets lip-sync to Mel Blanc's "The Hat I Got for Christmas Is Too Beeg".		Dec 29, 1958	Lost, audio exists.
Bubble Gum *	In the cold open, Ken Nordine's "Bubble Gum" recording begins (with Yorick acting it out onscreen), only to be interrupted by Omar: "Wait a minute, Yorick. We've got to start the show first." The Sam and Friends opening announce begins but is interrupted after "brought to you …" with the resumption of the Nordine track. Omar again interrupts: "No, no, no! Not yet, Yorick!' The opening is finally allowed to finish with "by Esskay." "All right, Yorick. If you're ready, now," Omar says. Yorick then lip-syncs to the Ken Nordine recording of "Bubble Gum". / The commercial from December 12, 1958 reappears.		Dec 29, 1958	Lost, audio exists.
That Old Black Magic *	The commercial from December 5, 1958 reappears, but the Esskay jingle was revoiced by Jim Henson. Kermit then goes into his sales pitch, but Moldy is not involved. / 1st performance. In the show's closing titles, the ending drumbeats of "That Old Black Magic" are heard after the "by Esskay" outro.		Dec 31, 1958	Lost, audio exists.
=== Season 4 ===
Yes! We Have No Bananas	Kermit, Chicken Liver, Moldy Hay, and Harry lipsynch to "Yes! We Have No Bananas." According to the year stated by Jeffrey Goodwin, this may be another performance of the song and the first.		1959 (date unknown)	Lost, existence confirmed from Jeffrey Goodwin's memory.
Sam the Magnificent	Sam performs some magic tricks, including the famous rabbit hat trick, card stick to the wall, and a long rope in the mouth—some tricks work and some don't (each trick is followed by small amounts of claps and gasps from the audience). An echoing voice says "Any volunteers?" Then Harry steps up as a volunteer to turn into a dog, but Sam accidentally uses the wrong spell, and the trick goes awry, turning Harry into a monster. Sam becomes terrified and runs away as the now-monster Harry just waves goodbye.		1960 (date unknown)	Lost, existence confirmed from Jeffrey Goodwin's memory, photo exists.
=== Undated episodes ===
Sh-Boom		(date unknown)		Lost, audio exists.
Banana Boat (Day-O)	1st performance.	(date unknown)		Lost, audio exists.
My Future Just Passed		(date unknown)		Lost, audio exists.
Six Months Out of Every Year		(date unknown)		Lost, audio exists.
Swan Lake		(date unknown)		Lost, audio exists.
Face the Funnies		(date unknown)		Lost, audio exists.
Sam, Don't Slam the Door!		(date unknown)		Lost, audio exists.
I'm a Lonely Little Petunia (in an Onion Patch)	Yorick, playing the Lonely Petunia crying all day in an onion patch, lip-syncs to a recording of the song by The Smith Bros. with Sid Bass and his orchestra.	(date unknown)		Lost, audio and image exist.
I Got the Shiniest Mouth in Town		(date unknown)		Lost, audio exists.
Rain No More		(date unknown)		Lost, audio exists.
Muskrat		(date unknown)		Lost, audio exists.
What'd He Say? (chipmunk sounds ver.)	In this song performed by Joe Reisman and His Orchestra and Chorus, the person lapses into chipmunk-like sped-up sound instead of mumbles.	(date unknown)		Lost, audio exists.
That's What I Like About the South	Sam, sporting a tuxedo, lip-syncs to a Phil Harris recording of the song.		(date unknown)	Lost, existence confirmed from Jeffrey Goodwin's memory.
Jailhouse Rock	Hank, Frank, Pierre, and Yorick in prisoner outfits (with Pierre and Yorick donning B&W-striped jail hats) dance behind jail bars and lip-sync to an Elvis Presley recording of the song, up until they run away from Sam (sporting a cop outfit) at the end of the song.		(date unknown)	Lost, existence confirmed from Jeffrey Goodwin's memory.
Little Blue Riding Hood	With characters lip-syncing to a Stan Freberg recording of "Little Blue Riding Hood", the skit opens with a title card that says "Muppet News," featuring Sam as the news anchor. The scene then cuts to Omar (playing the detective, sporting a detective suit and fedora), and Bernice (playing the girl in the blue hood). The scene then cuts to Omar ringing the doorbell to talk to Bernice's grandma (played by Mushmellon wearing glasses and an old lady wig). Omar was on the bed, when Bernice walks in and tells Omar that her grandma has a mustache and she doesn't. The skit ends with Sam and Omar talking. According to Jeffrey Goodwin, who recounted seeing this episode on TV while Sam and Friends was still on the air back in the day, this skit was broadcast in color. (He erroneously stated Mildred/Henrietta was playing the girl in the blue hood.)		(date unknown)	Lost, existence confirmed from Jeffrey Goodwin's memory, photo exists.
Lost Hammer, Long Journey	Professor Madcliffe builds a spaceship and needs one more touch. He thinks he lost his hammer, then he starts panicking and running across the world. First, he rushes to Paris where he tells Pierre the French Rat, "Have you seen a hammer around here?!" "Nope," says Pierre (with a voice sounding like that from Stan Freberg's "C'est Si Bon" recording). Madcliffe then bolts over to Mexico and meets up with Chicken Liver, who is riding a horse (which may be a reference to "The Westerners" clip). "Have you seen a hammer around here?!" yells Madcliffe. "Que?" asks Chicken Liver in a Spanish accent. The professor repeats his line in Spanish. "No," says Chicken Liver. Professor nods his head, then travels over to Britain, with Kermit asking the same question and responding with a British accent. The title card "34 hours later" follows up, then Madcliffe returns to his lab and suddenly notices his hammer lying in the corner all this time—he then facepalms. No materials or documentation for this episode survive; As there are two known programs from September 1959 and May 1961 that dealt with Professor Madcliffe looking for a hammer to use on a rocket or spaceship, it is unknown which of these programs this episode was part of, but given that the Friday episode that aired on May 5, 1961 has no surviving materials and marks a gap between the May 4 and 8, 1961 episodes in documentation, it is possible that this episode may be a lead-in to the plot from the May 8, 1961 episode "Space Launch".		(date unknown)	Lost, existence confirmed from Jeffrey Goodwin's memory.
Average American Male	On the behalf of a human hand onscreen, the announcer introduces the average American male, focusing on Kermit. He describes Kermit's traits, while hand holds up an Esskay Meats package and Kermit pantomimes a commercial. As the announcer continues, Kermit reacts to each word described about his personality, and human hands count them on their fingers. When one hand slaps a red heart on Kermit's chest, the announcer claims that one thing (love) "spoils his composure" and "completely destroys him". Kermit tramples the hands and begins to sing a song. After the song, Kermit falls, and the hands enter, pick him up, and carry him off. (It's unknown what song Kermit performed or lip-synced to, because no recording of this episode survives and the script does not indicate which song was used.)		(date unknown)	Lost, script exists.
Beat the Press	In a parody of an NBC news program Meet the Press (which also originated in the same studio at WRC-TV), a panel of columnists (Irma Firstleft and Kermit Secondturn) and moderator Stephen R. Moderator interview the President of the National Brotherhood of Swindlers, Hoods, and Confidence Men (otherwise known as the gangsters' union), James Forthright, and his Vice President, John Smith.		(date unknown)	Lost, audio exists.
The Curtain	Kermit admires a beautiful red curtain and asks Sam to open and close it on cue. They rehearse several times, and Sam follows Kermit's commands but each time Kermit says a word that rhymes with "close", Sam mistakes his words as hearing the cue and closes the curtain in front of Kermit. Kermit corrects him on what words he meant when talking, and asks him to reopen the curtain which Sam does, so that Kermit can get on with the show. Kermit again accidentally ends his sentences with words that rhyme with "close", prompting Sam to close the curtain on him again, believing he heard the cue. Sam opening and closing the curtain repeatedly while Kermit tries to maintain control persists through the end of the episode.		(date unknown)	Lost, audio exists.

==== Notes ====
- Sam and Friends was originally cancelled on October 10, 1955. The rest of the performances intended for the first season are believed to have occurred on WRC's Afternoon, which Jim and Jane continued to work on after the initial cancellation of Sam and Friends.
- On May 14, 1956, the Muppets became a part of Footlight Theater with Paul Arnold. On September 10, 1956, after Footlight Theater reverted to its old format, the Muppets and Paul Arnold now appeared in their own block Sam and Friends with Paul Arnold, causing a new season of Sam and Friends.
- After Jim Henson began performing his own voices, Paul Arnold was needed less and was no longer on the show by mid-1958, causing the Muppets to appear on their own and leading Sam and Friends to officially return to its original format. Bob Payne joined the show and substituted for a Europe-bound Henson on June 19, 1958; sketches during that time either only lip-synced to records or were performed with only background music and no dialogue at all. This format lasted until Henson returned to the show after returning home from Europe on August 2. Paul Arnold eventually moved out of Washington, DC in October.
  - It's unclear when a third season of Sam and Friends actually started, but given by the chain of events in 1958 including Paul becoming needed less on the show, Jim leaving for Europe in June, and WRC advertising as of September 8 only listing the show as Sam and Friends—The Muppets and no longer mentioning Paul Arnold on there, it's possible the third season began around the time Jim left for Europe.
- On November 24, 1958, the show is now sponsored by Esskay. During this era, the series runs for about four seasons until its conclusion on December 15, 1961.
- Undated episodes include episodes or transcribed recordings whose airdates could not be determined due to lack of recordation of the dates on them.

== Unknown Episodes ==
Unknown episodes that lack documentation, have confusing script materials or have only surviving photos with no identifiable episode info. It is unknown what episodes the unidentified photos may be related to. None of these unknown episodes have any surviving recordings as well.

Title	Plot
Anything You Can Do (parody feat. Kermit)	Kermit performs a parody of "Anything You Can Do" with prerecorded footage of himself. An excerpt of the revised lyrics follows: Kermit 1: I can be on TV, where the people see me. Kermit 2: I can be in person, and without rehearsin'. Kermit 1: Lots of people know my face. Kermit 2: That face there? Kermit 1: Yes. Kermit 2: I don't care. Documents for this sketch were found in visit to the Jim Henson Archives via Toughpigs, Pantalones, and Scarecroe; whether this specific parody of the song performed by Kermit was done on Sam and Friends is unknown, and Kermit's own parody of the song with said revised lyrics could just be a script for the performance and may not be the final broadcast version, as surviving audio recordings of the Sam and Friends broadcasts used the Ethel Merman recording of the song as lip-sync material.

=== Songs ===
- That Old Black Magic (January 26, 1959): Kermit and Sam lip-synch to a recording of "That Old Black Magic" by Louis Prima and Keely Smith. To date, this is the only surviving Sam and Friends episode to feature Sam himself.
- I've Got You Under My Skin (October 7, 1959): Icky Gunk (sporting a blonde, curly wig), and Hank and Frank serve as chorus singers in a lip-synched rendition of Stan Freberg' "I've Got You Under My Skin" while Kermit, in spoken dialogue, messes up the lyrics.
- C'est Si Bon (October 12, 1959): In a French village setting, Moldy Hay lip-synchs to Stan Freberg's rendition of "C'est Si Bon", with Hank and Frank repeating his dialogue too literally as a backup choir.
- Singin' in the Rain (November 19, 1959): A little girl Muppet lip-synchs to a sped-up version of Edie Adams's rendition of "Singin' in the Rain" as water begins to pour. Eventually, she is submerged in a water-filled bucket.
- Hunger Is From (February 12, 1960): Lip-synching to Ken Nordine and the Fred Katz Group's "Hunger Is From", Yorick details his midnight snacking while eating a plate full of food.
- A Horse Named Bill (March 15, 1960): Kermit lip-synchs and plays the banjo to Bob Gibson's rendition of "A Horse Named Bill."
- Miss Cone (December 9, 1960): An animated episode made with cutouts and synced to the titular song by Ken Nordine and the Fred Katz Group.
- Glow Worm (circa April 1961): Humming along to "The Glow-Worm", Kermit is bugged by some inchworm-like fingers and is later met with a human hand.

== In popular culture ==
Sam and Friends is mentioned in chapter 2 of Kermit the Frog's book Before You Leap, under the heading of "My First Big Splash".

Yorick made a cameo appearance in a Sesame Street sketch from Season 1 in which he eats the letter R.

Henrietta appeared in The Muppets on Puppets during Rowlf the Dog's mixed-up fairy tale sketch portraying the fairy godmother. In this appearance, Henrietta was also performed by Jerry Juhl.

Sam, Harry the Hipster, and Yorick made an appearance in The Muppets: A Celebration of 30 Years. Sam and Harry can be seen at a table together as Harry questions Kermit's modern appearance while Yorick is hiding next to him. The three later reappear at a table with Jim Henson as he is handed a bill by Grover.

In Spring 2010, early puppet characters were rejoined in Henson Alternative's Stuffed and Unstrung, for two musical pieces.

In August 2010, Jane Henson donated ten puppets from the show (including the original Kermit) to the Smithsonian Institution's National Museum of American History. The Omar puppet not included in the ten that were donated later ended up at the Center for Puppetry Arts as part of the Jim Henson Collection exhibit.

In July 2016, Hyattsville, Maryland, installed a memorial to Jim Henson in the city's Magruder Park, featuring a large planter embossed with images of characters from Sam and Friends and benches inscribed with quotes from Henson.

Yorick made a visual appearance in the 2021 Muppet Babies episode "Summer's Disaster-Piece", where he replaces the head on Thomas Gainsborough's painting The Blue Boy.
