= Shiseikatsu =

Shiseikatsu (Japanese: 私生活, lit. 'private life, personal life', しせいかつ) may refer to:

== Music ==
=== Songs ===
- "Backstage" (私生活, Shiseikatsu), a 2007 song by Tokyo Jihen off the album Variety (Tokyo Jihen album)
- "Shiseikatsu" (私生活), a 1970 song by Mari Henmi

=== Albums ===
- Private Life (私生活, Shiseikatsu), a 1991 album by Aya Sugimoto
- Shiseikatsu (私生活), a 1999 album by Miki Nakatani

== Other uses ==
- "Private Life" (私生活, Shiseikatsu), 2002 episode 7 of The Private Detective Mike
- Shiseikatsu (Japanese: 私生活, lit. 'Private Life'), novel by Takurō Kanki that won the 90th Naoki Prize 1983

== See also ==
- Personal Life (disambiguation)
- Private Life (disambiguation)
