= The Best of Kermit on Sesame Street =

- VHS cover
- Directed by: John Chiappardi; Emily Squires; Jon Stone; David Heeley
- Written by: Tony Geiss; Judy Freudberg; Cathi Rosenberg-Turow; Tom Dunsmuir
- Based on: Kermit the Frog by Jim Henson Sesame Street by Joan Ganz Cooney and Lloyd Morrisett
- Produced by: Karin Young Shiel; Nancy Kanter (executive producer); Ginger Brown (line producer); Angela Santomero (associate producer)
- Starring: Steve Whitmire; Jim Henson; Frank Oz
- Edited by: Todd Darling (On-Time Off-Line)
- Music by: David Axlerod (songs); Chris Cerf (songs); Dave Conner (songs); Sarah Durkee (songs); Tony Geiss (songs); Paul Jacobs (songs); Jeff Moss (songs); Sam Pottle (songs); Joe Raposo (songs); Mark Saltzman (songs); Norman Stiles (songs); Dick Lieb (additional music); Danny Epstein (music coordinator); Dave Conner (music supervisor)
- Production company: Children's Television Workshop
- Distributed by: Sony Wonder
- Release date: September 1, 1998
- Running time: 29 minutes
- Language: English

The Best of Kermit on Sesame Street is a 1998 direct-to-video special featuring Kermit and his career on Sesame Street.

== Plot ==
Kermit is being awarded the Frog of the Year award, presented by Grover. Grover first recites a long poem about frogs, which introduces various Kermit the Frog segments from Sesame Street, while being interrupted by the Three Little Pigs, who are there because Kermit introduced them twice on Sesame Street News.

== Cast ==
- Steve Whitmire as Kermit the Frog (New Material) and one of the Three Little Pigs
- Jim Henson as Kermit the Frog (Series)
- Frank Oz as Grover, Parker Piper and Pinocchio
- Jerry Nelson as one of the Tarnish Brothers, and Frog
- Richard Hunt as one of the Tarnish Brothers
- Lisa Buckley as one of the Three Little Pigs
- Tyler Bunch as one of the Three Little Pigs
- Kevin Clash as the Announcer, Frog
- Peter Linz as Big Bad Wolf
- Christopher Cerf as one of the Tarnish Brothers
- Ivy Austin and Cheryl Hardwick as Moo Wave Vocals

Additional Muppets performed by David Rudman, Martin P. Robinson, Noel MacNeal, Pam Arciero, Bryant Young, John Tartaglia, Rick Lyon, Jane Henson, Caroly Wilcox, Ed Christie, Camille Kampouris, James Kroupa, Richard Termine, Pat Hodelin, Jim Martin, Cheryl Blaylock, Brian Meehl.

=== Child Cast ===
- Megan Ng as Grover's Friend
- Katie Scharf as Child from "Elbows" Sequence
- Joey Calvan as Joey

== Songs ==
- "I Love My Elbows"
- "Caribbean Amphibian"
- "African Alphabet"
- "Do-Op Hop"
- "It's Not Easy Bein' Green"
- "Tadpole"
- "This Frog"
