= Private Lives (disambiguation) =

Private Lives is a 1930 play by Noël Coward.

Private Lives may also refer to:

- Private Lives (1931 film), based on the play by Noël Coward
- Private Lives (2001 film), an Argentine-Spanish melodrama film
- Private Lives (TV series), a South Korean television series
- "Private Lives" (Auf Wiedersehen, Pet), a 1983 television episode
- "Private Lives" (House), a 2010 television episode
- "Private Lives" (A Touch of Frost), a 1999 television episode
- Private Lives (band), a British musical group

== See also ==
- Personal Life (disambiguation)
- Private Life (disambiguation)
- Private (disambiguation)
- Lives (disambiguation)
- Life (disambiguation)
