= Live birth =

Live birth may refer to:

- Viviparity, a reproductive mode wherein an embryo develops inside the body of its mother
- In human reproduction, the birth of a living child (as opposed to stillborn); see Live birth (human)
