= Lives, Iran =

Lives ليوس
- Village
- Location within Iran
- Coordinates: 32°44′52″N 48°45′40″E
- Country: Iran
- Province: Khuzestan
- County: Dezful
- Bakhsh: Sardasht
- Rural District: Seyyedvaliyeddin

Population (2006)
  - Total: 202
- Time zone: UTC+3:30 (IRST)
  - Summer (DST): UTC+4:30 (IRDT)

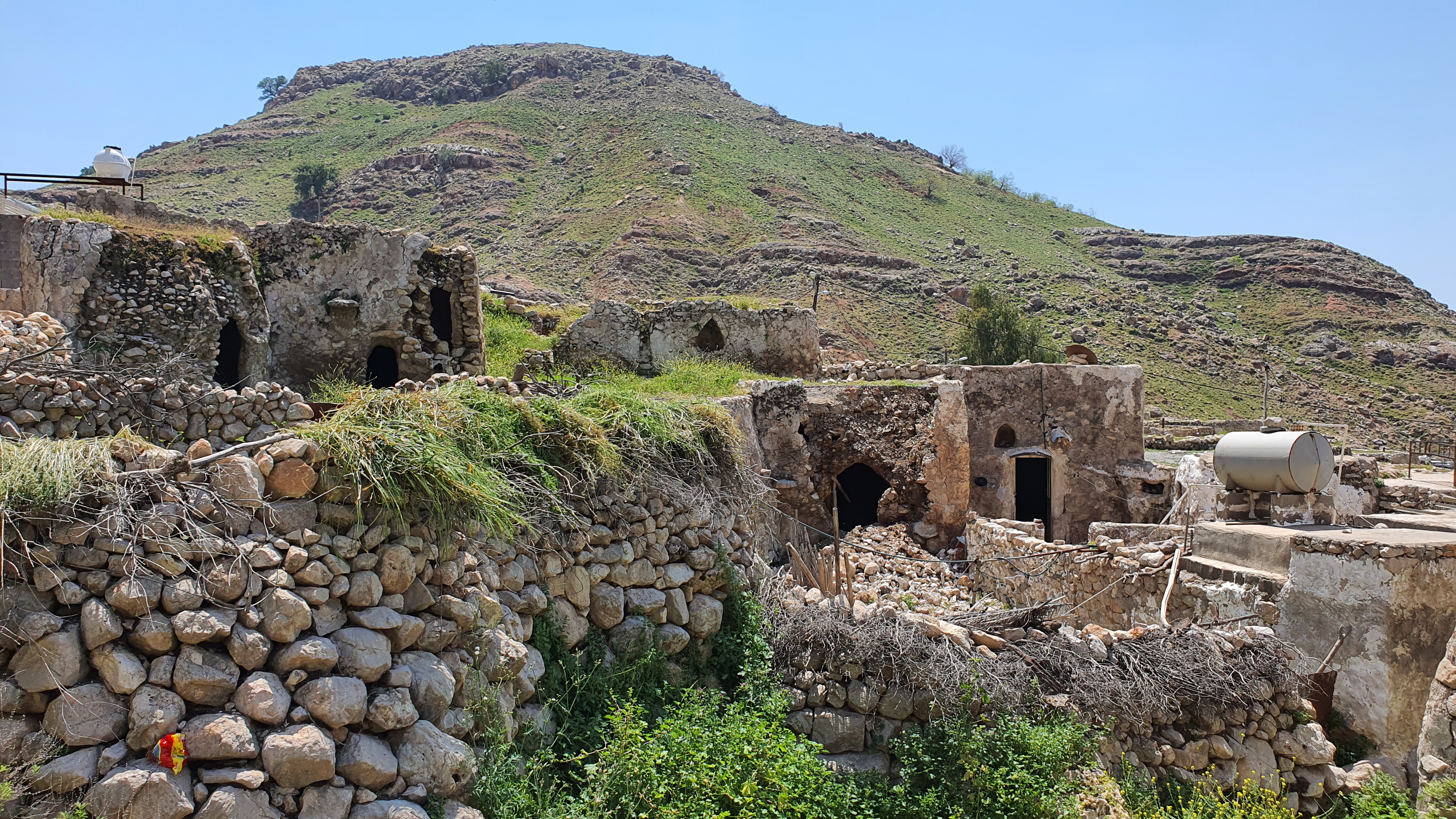

Lives (Persian: ليوس, also Romanized as Līves, Leyves, and Līyves) is a village in Seyyedvaliyeddin Rural District, Sardasht District, Dezful County, Khuzestan Province, Iran. At the 2006 census, its population was 202, in 41 families.
