= Lively, West Virginia =

- Unincorporated community
- Location within West Virginia Location within the United States
- Coordinates: 37°56′25″N 81°15′26″W
- Country: United States
- State: West Virginia
- County: Fayette
- Elevation: 1,598 ft (487 m)
- Time zone: UTC-5 (Eastern (EST))
  - Summer (DST): UTC-4 (EDT)
- GNIS ID: 1554977

Lively is an unincorporated community in Fayette County, West Virginia, United States.

The community most likely was named after Joseph Lively, a pioneer settler.
