= The Muppets: A Celebration of 30 Years =

- Genre: Family film Television special
- Created by: Henson Associates
- Written by: Jerry Juhl
- Directed by: Peter Harris
- Starring: Jim Henson; Frank Oz; Jerry Nelson; Richard Hunt; Dave Goelz; Steve Whitmire; Caroll Spinney
- Country of origin: United States

Production
- Executive producer: Jim Henson
- Producers: Andrew Solt; Diana Birkenfield
- Editors: Susan F. Walker; Jim Milio; Steve Muscarella; Mark West
- Production company: Henson Associates

Original release
- Network: CBS
- Release: January 21, 1986

The Muppets: A Celebration of 30 Years is a one-hour special starring Jim Henson's Muppets. It was shot in Toronto, Ontario in 1985 and aired January 21, 1986 on CBS.

== Plot ==
Muppets from various productions, including The Muppet Show, Sesame Street, Sam and Friends, as well as characters from Fraggle Rock such as Uncle Traveling Matt and Sprocket, convened to commemorate their thirtieth anniversary through a celebratory banquet. The event featured a retrospective of their cinematic and television endeavors.

The proceedings commenced with a montage of Muppet clips spanning from 1955 to 1985, accompanied by Ethel Merman's rendition of "There's No Business Like Show Business." The gala unfolds in an opulent ballroom teeming with Jim Henson's esteemed creations, save for those unable to attend, as noted by announcer John Harlan. Hosted by Fozzie Bear and spotlighting guest of honor Kermit the Frog, the program delved into the Muppets' chronicles and musical highlights.

Despite Kermit's reluctance to accept Fozzie's effusive praise, the latter persisted, underscoring Kermit's pivotal role in launching the Muppets' careers. A retrospective journey ensued, featuring clips from seminal Muppet productions such as The Muppet Movie, The Muppets Take Manhattan, and The Great Muppet Caper. Notable segments included Fozzie and Rowlf's rendition of "I Got Rhythm", Gonzo the Great's daring motorcycle stunt, and Rita Moreno's performance of "Fever" alongside Animal.

After a tribute to Miss Piggy and a showcase of Muppet book, record, and magazine covers, a comical interruption by Sweetums and other Muppet monsters led to a raucous montage. Count von Count then introduced Bert and Ernie, followed by a compilation of memorable scenes from Sesame Street featuring beloved characters such as Cookie Monster and Big Bird.

The presentation continued with a showcase of clips from animated Saturday morning cartoons like Muppet Babies and Little Muppet Monsters, as well as excerpts from Fraggle Rock. Imaginative sequences curated by Uncle Traveling Matt and musical interludes presented by Dr. Teeth and The Electric Mayhem added depth to the retrospective.

The tribute to Kermit culminates with a poignant reedit of Linda Ronstadt's performance of "When I Grow Too Old to Dream", evoking heartfelt emotions among the Muppets. The program concludes with a clip from The Muppet Movie, featuring the ensemble singing "Rainbow Connection".

Jim Henson briefly appears at the program's conclusion, humorously presented with a bill by Grover. Kermit, in the closing remarks, expressed gratitude for the celebration, signaling the dawn of the Muppets' next thirty years with a rehearsal scheduled for the following day.

== Notes ==
- Later syndicated alongside The Muppet Show.
- The Muppets: A Celebration of 30 Years makes reference to the short-lived Saturday Morning series Little Muppet Monsters, which was still in production during the taping of this special. However, the series was cancelled by the time the special aired.

== Cast ==
- Jim Henson - Himself

=== Muppet performers ===
- Jim Henson - Kermit the Frog, Rowlf the Dog, Ernie, Dr. Teeth, The Swedish Chef, Waldorf, Link Hogthrob, Sam, Harry the Hipster, and Yorick
- Frank Oz - Miss Piggy, Fozzie Bear, Animal, Sam Eagle, Bert, Grover, and Cookie Monster
- Jerry Nelson - Floyd Pepper, Count von Count, Crazy Harry, Lew Zealand, Two-Headed Monster (Left Head), Robin the Frog, and Camilla the Chicken
- Richard Hunt - Scooter, Janice, Statler, Sweetums, and Two-Headed Monster (Right Head)
- Dave Goelz - Gonzo the Great, Zoot, Uncle Traveling Matt, and Beauregard
- Steve Whitmire - Sprocket the Dog and Rizzo the Rat
- Caroll Spinney - Big Bird and Oscar the Grouch

Additional Muppets performed by Terry Angus, Kevin Clash, Camille Bonora, David Rudman, Michael Earl, Jonathan Paine, and Fred Stinson

=== Appearing in archive footage ===
- Julie Andrews
- Harry Belafonte
- Carol Burnett
- George Burns
- Ray Charles
- Cher
- James Coburn
- Jimmy Dean
- John Denver
- Elton John
- Gene Kelly
- Steve Martin
- Ed McMahon
- Ethel Merman
- Rita Moreno
- Zero Mostel
- Linda Ronstadt
- Diana Ross
- Brooke Shields
- Sylvester Stallone
- Ed Sullivan
- Lily Tomlin
- Ben Vereen
- Orson Welles
