= Live.com =

Live.com may refer to:

- live.com, a URL used by Microsoft for their Outlook.com and OneDrive products
- Windows Live, a discontinued brand name for a set of services and software products from Microsoft
- Windows Live Personalized Experience, a web portal formerly known as live.com
- Microsoft Bing, a search engine formerly known as Windows Live Search and Live Search, whose URL was live.com until 2009
- Outlook.com, an online email service formerly offering @live.com accounts
