= Vividata =

Vividata is a Toronto-based not-for-profit research organization that provides impact and marketing data on print media readership in Canada.

Vividata resulted from a 2014 merger between the Print Measurement Bureau (PMB) and the Newspaper Audience Databank (NADbank). The merged company temporarily used the name Amalco. The non-profit PMB traced itself back to 1973, when it conducted its first national print survey. PMB conducted surveys to assess the level of readership for many magazines sold in Canada, and also conducts industry-specific surveys such as for medical profession publications. NADbank's work had significant overlap with PMB. Vividata also has a custom syndicated survey division known as Vivintel.

== See also ==
- Numeris, an analogous company covering Canadian broadcast media
