= Donald Lively =

American lawyer

Donald E. Lively is the co-creator and first dean of Florida Coastal School of Law and founding dean of Phoenix School of Law. Florida Coastal School of Law is the first investor-owned law school to be fully accredited by the American Bar Association. Its founding, among other things, aimed to address the State of Florida's historical legacy of profound underrepresentation of minorities in the legal profession. It has distinguished itself on the basis of student outcomes, as graduates consistently have experienced success in moot court competitions and on the bar examination and outperformed students with similar academic quality indicators. Lively is the author of more than 20 books on subjects including constitutional law, race, gender, and civil rights, freedom of speech, and the judicial process. Several of his books have won awards. He has authored more than 50 law review articles and essays, has lectured extensively domestically and overseas, and is a recipient of the Florida Supreme Court Professionalism Award. He is the creator of Law Tuesday, a legal services program that serves disadvantaged persons who otherwise would have no meaningful access to the legal system. The Ohio State Bar Association in 2004 named Law Tuesday the state's outstanding pro bono program.
