= Private Life =

Private Life may refer to:

- life in the private sphere

== Stage and screen ==
=== Films ===
- Private Life (1942 film), a French film
- Private Life (1982 film), a Soviet film
- Private Life (2018 film), an American film
- A Private Life, a French film

=== Television ===
- "A Private Life" (Six Feet Under), an episode of the show Six Feet Under
- "Private Life" (私生活, Shiseikatsu), 2002 episode 7 of The Private Detective Mike

== Music ==
=== Songs ===
- "Private Life" (song), written by Chrissie Hynde, and released by the Pretenders in 1979 and Grace Jones in 1980
- "Private Life", a song by Oingo Boingo from Nothing to Fear, 1982

=== Albums ===
- Private Life: The Compass Point Sessions, a 1998 compilation album by Grace Jones
- Private Life (私生活, Shiseikatsu), a 1991 album by Aya Sugimoto

== Other uses ==
- Shiseikatsu (Japanese: 私生活, lit. 'Private Life'), novel by Takurō Kanki that won the 90th Naoki Prize 1983

== See also ==
- His Private Life (1926 film), an American silent comedy starring Lupino Lane
- His Private Life (1928 film), an American silent comedy starring Adolphe Menjou
- Her Private Life, a 1929 American drama film
- Her Private Life (TV series), a 2019 South Korean TV show
- Private Lives (disambiguation)
- Vie privée (disambiguation) (French: private life)
- Shiseikatsu (disambiguation) (Japanese: 私生活, lit. 'private life, personal life', しせいかつ)
- Social life (disambiguation)
- Personal Life (disambiguation)
