= Lyfing =

Origin
- Origin: Anglo-Saxon

Lyfing (from leof, meaning "darling") is an Anglo-Saxon given name. Notable people bearing this name include:

- Lyfing, Archbishop of Canterbury (died 1020), advisor to King Ethelred the Unready
- Lyfing of Winchester (died 1047), advisor to King Canute the Dane
