= Social network automation =

Social Network Automation refers to tools that are used to semi/automate the process of posting content to social networking and social bookmarking websites. Tools can range from mostly manual and free to semi-automated tools which are either commercial standalone software or paid subscriptions. Other solutions include buttons for blog posts, browser toolbars, and fully outsourced consulting services.

== Background ==
Social networking sites (ex: Digg, Reddit, Propeller, etc.) run on a cycle of content (stories, pictures, videos) attracting users who interact with the content (voting, commenting) and who are then inspired to provide new content (original or culled from outside sources), thereby attracting more readers, etc., etc. (see Web 2.0)

While much of the content is submitted by so-called-casual users a significant portion of stories are created specifically for social networking sites. These stores are generally submitted to several sites to maximize the return on investment. (Note that the motivation need not be commercial but may be personal or political (see Ron Paul for President)

To aid people submitting stories to multiple social networking and bookmarking sites, a number of tools have been created.

== Mostly-Manual Solutions ==
These solutions are characterized by the following common attributes:

- Standalone, web based
- Free
- Direct URL submission
- Significant breadth of sites (20 to 70) supported
- Attractive UI
- Lack of workflow
- Low levels of error reporting

== Semi-Automated Solutions ==
These solutions are all commercial software and do not seem to have been reviewed by an independent third party. They seem to all be standalone Windows-only based systems. They all claim to have the following features:

- username/password login
- low number of sites supported (20-30)
- semi/automated site navigation
- historical activity reporting

== Miscellaneous Solutions: Buttons ==
Some vendors offer "buttons" that you can place under your blog posts that will automatically start the submission process for your content or which will more easily allow your readers to find and "vote" for your content on that service. As these seem to be less about automation and more about convenience they have been separated from the automation tools. However, there is some overlap, with some automation providers offering buttons.

Many of the social networking sites also offer buttons, the most commonly seen being, of course, Digg's Digg This badge. and OnlyWire's

== Miscellaneous Solutions: Toolbars ==
Many social networking sites also offer toolbars (mostly for Mozilla/Firefox and Internet Explorer) which aid in use of the social sites. These toolbars also offer easier submission of articles to and voting on stories. However they seem to be more about convenience than automation, so they are separated as well. One of the best known toolbars is from StumbleUpon.

== Miscellaneous Solutions: Fully Outsourced ==
There are a large number of firms offering fully outsourced solutions for posting content to social networking and bookmarking sites. These are traditional consulting engagements and should be evaluated as such.
