= Live.ly =

Chinese live-streaming service, now TikTok

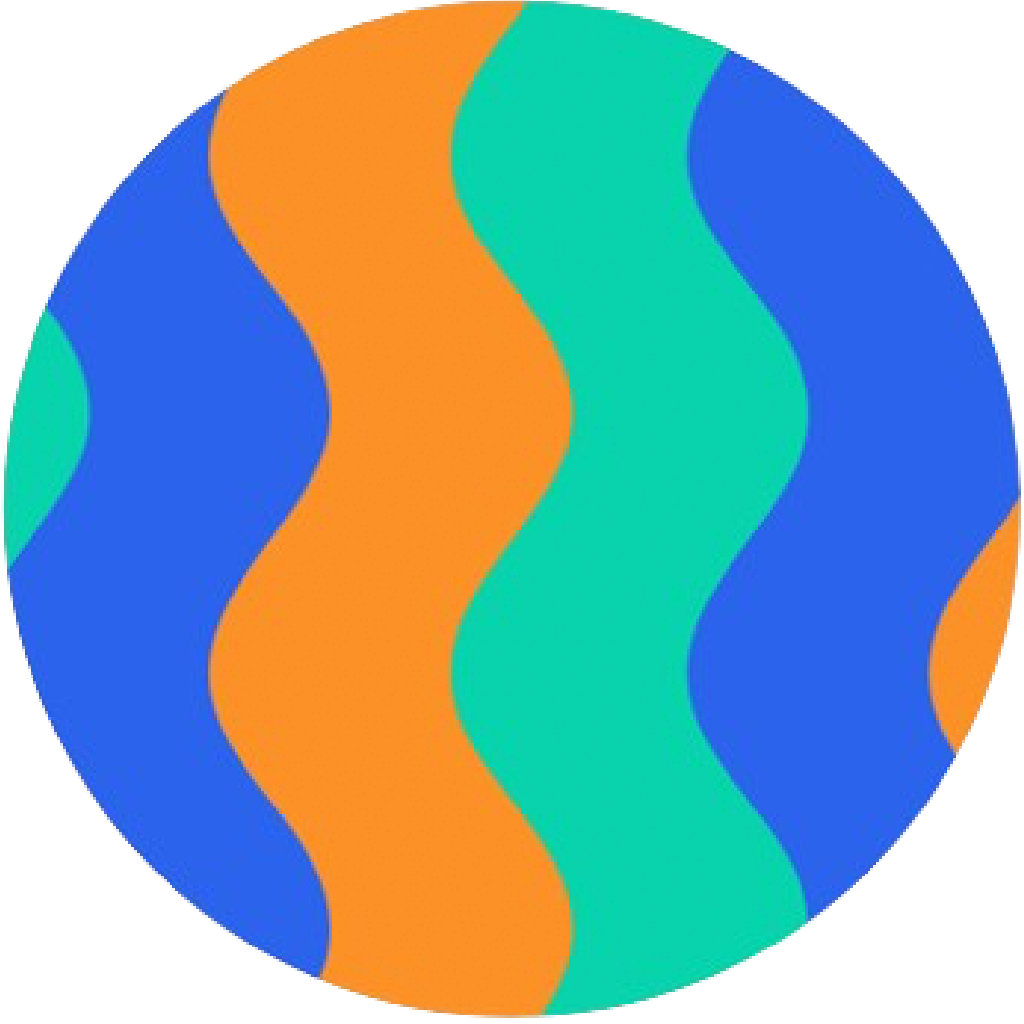
- Logo
- Original author: Musical.ly Inc.
- Developer: Musical.ly Inc. (2016–2017); ByteDance (2017–2018); TikTok (2018–present)
- Release: iOS; July 24, 2016; Android; September 12, 2016
- Final release: August 2, 2018; 8 years ago
- Preview release: May 2016; 10 years ago
- Operating system: iOS; Android
- Successor: TikTok
- Type: Live streaming
- License: Proprietary software with terms of use

Live.ly (pronounced "Lively", stylized as live.ly) was a live-streaming service created by Musical.ly in 2016, headquartered in Shanghai with an American office in San Francisco. It allowed users to stream live videos, interact through chat, and send virtual goods. Following its launch, the app amassed over 40 million active users by late 2016. In 2018, after ByteDance acquired Musical.ly, Live.ly was merged with TikTok, resulting in its shutdown.

== History ==
In August 2014, Musical.ly was launched by Musical.ly Inc. The app quickly gained popularity, particularly among teenagers, and by June 2016, it had amassed an active user base of approximately 90 million.

In May 2016, Musical.ly announced the launch of Live.ly as a competitor to other social media platforms releasing live streaming services. Musical.ly initiated beta testing of the platform in the same month. Live.ly was published on the iTunes Store in late June 2016 and gained a significant user base shortly after its release.

On July 24, 2016, Musical.ly officially released Live.ly globally at VidCon.

By October 2016, Live.ly had surpassed Twitter's Periscope iOS app, amassing approximately 40 million active users. In a two-week period, the top 10 accounts collectively earned US$46,000 from virtual goods sent by users.

In June 2018, Live.ly was removed from app stores in preparation for its merger with TikTok. ByteDance, the company that acquired Musical.ly and Live.ly, announced plans to merge the two into a single app.

On August 2, 2018, Live.ly was merged into TikTok alongside Musical.ly following ByteDance's reported US$1 billion acquisition. After its shutdown, users were redirected to the live-streaming platform LiveMe.

== See also ==
- Facebook Live
- Periscope
