= Lives =

Lives may refer to:

- The plural form of a life
- Lives, Iran, a village in Khuzestan Province, Iran
- The number of lives in a video game
- Parallel Lives, a.k.a. Lives of the Noble Greeks and Romans, a series of biographies of famous men, written by Plutarch and thus often called Plutarch's Lives or The Lives of Plutarch
- LiVES, a video editing program and VJ tool
- "Lives", a song by Daron Malakian and Scars on Broadway from the album Dictator
- "Lives", a song by Modest Mouse from the album The Moon & Antarctica
- A short form of Lives of the Most Excellent Painters, Sculptors, and Architects, a 16th-century book by Giorgio Vasari
- 'LIVES' - Lincolnshire Integrated Voluntary Emergency Service, Prehospital care provider in Lincolnshire, UK

== See also ==
- Live (disambiguation)
- Life (disambiguation)
- Living (disambiguation)
