= Boaz and Jachin =

Two pillars on the porch of Solomon's Temple

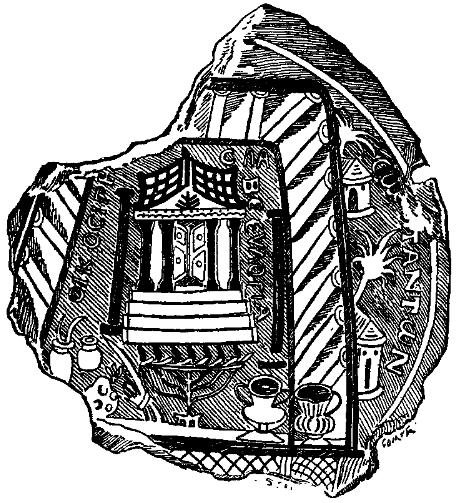
Image of a 3rd-century (AD) glass bowl which depicts Solomon's Temple. Boaz and Jachin are the detached black pillars shown on either side of the entrance steps.

According to the Bible, Boaz (Hebrew: בֹּעַז, romanized: Bōʿaz) and Jachin (Hebrew: יָכִין, romanized: Yāḵīn) were two copper, brass or bronze pillars which stood on the porch of Solomon's Temple, the first Temple in Jerusalem. They are used as symbols in Freemasonry and sometimes in religious architecture. They were probably not support structures but free-standing, based on similar pillars found in other nearby temples.

== Description ==
=== In the Bible ===
The pillars were nearly six feet (1.8 metres) thick and 27 feet (8.2 metres) tall. The eight-foot (2.4 metres) high brass chapiters, or capitals, on top of the pillars bore decorations, in brass, of lilies. The original measurement as taken from the Torah was in cubits, which records that the pillars were 18 cubits high and 12 cubits around, and hollow—four fingers thick. (Jeremiah 52:21–22). Nets of checkerwork covered the bowl of each chapiter, decorated with rows of 200 pomegranates, wreathed with seven chains for each chapiter, and topped with lilies (1 Kings 7:13–22, 41–42).

The pillars did not survive the destruction of the First Temple; Jeremiah 52:17 reports: "The Chaldeans broke up the bronze columns of the House of the Lord". II Kings 25:13 has a similar account. The pillars were carried away in pieces for ease of transportation. When the Second Temple was built, the pillars were not returned, and there exists no record of new pillars being constructed to replace them.

=== Orientation ===
==== Jewish commentators ====
According to rabbi Raymond Apple, "Jewish commentators on I Kings 7:21 maintain that it was when one stood inside the building and looked out toward the entrance in the east" that Jachin was on the right (to the south) and Boaz was on the left (to the north).

==== Josephus ====
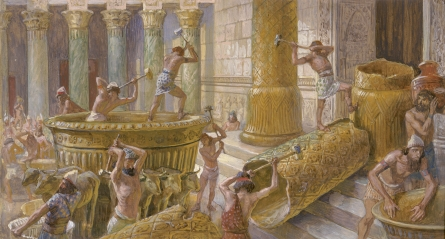
Destruction of the pillars and the Molten Sea. c. 1900 by James Tissot

According to the first-century Romano-Jewish scholar Josephus' book Antiquities of the Jews, Jachin (Hebrew יָכִין yakin "He/it will establish") stood on the right on the portico of Solomon's Temple, while Boaz (Hebrew בֹּעַז boʿaz "In him/it [is] strength") stood on the left, and the two were made by a Canaanite craftsman named Hiram. An explanatory note by William Whiston on paragraph 6 of the same chapter, explains this as agreeing with the opinion of the other Jewish commentators.

==== Opposing view ====
Carl Watzinger (1877-1948), a German archaeologist, assuming that the point of view was in the east looking toward the temple, reversed this traditional placement of the pillars in a drawing of the temple which has been used by subsequent sources including Encyclopaedia Judaica. Due to this, some recent sources place Jachin to the north and Boaz to the south, contrary to the older tradition.

== Cultural influence ==
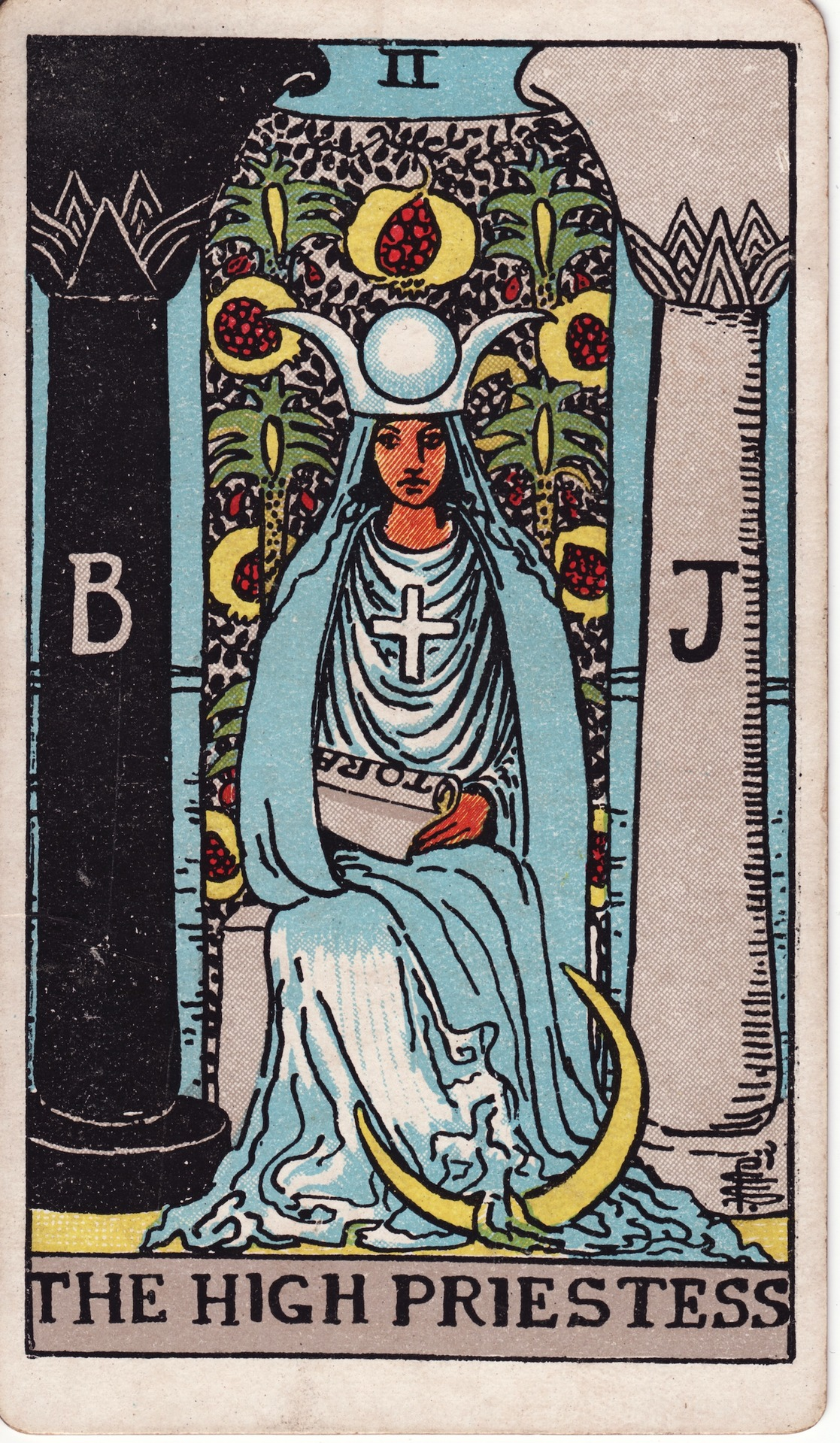
The High Priestess or The Popess (II) in the Rider–Waite Tarot

The Romanesque Church of Santa Maria Maggiore at Tuscania, Italy, has a recessed entrance flanked by a pair of free-standing stone columns intended to evoke Boaz and Jachin. Similar pillars intended to represent Boaz and Jachin also exist in Würzburg Cathedral (Germany) and Dalby Church (Sweden). Columns representing Boaz and Jachin can be found in most Masonic lodges and are emblematic of their use in Masonic ritual. The pillars are part of a symbolic use of Solomon's Temple itself.

Jakin, an incorporated town in the U.S. state of Georgia, takes its name from the pillar.

Some variants of the tarot card The High Priestess depict Boaz and Jachin.

=== In fiction ===
- Russell Hoban's novel The Lion of Boaz-Jachin and Jachin-Boaz (1973) has two characters named after the pillars.
- In the 2002 anime series Gundam SEED, the approaches to Coordinator space habitats in lunar orbit are guarded by a pair of asteroid fortresses named "Boaz" and "Jachin Due".
- In The Lost Symbol (2009), a Robert Langdon novel by Dan Brown, the villain Mal'akh has images of Boaz and Jachin tattooed on his legs.

== Gallery ==
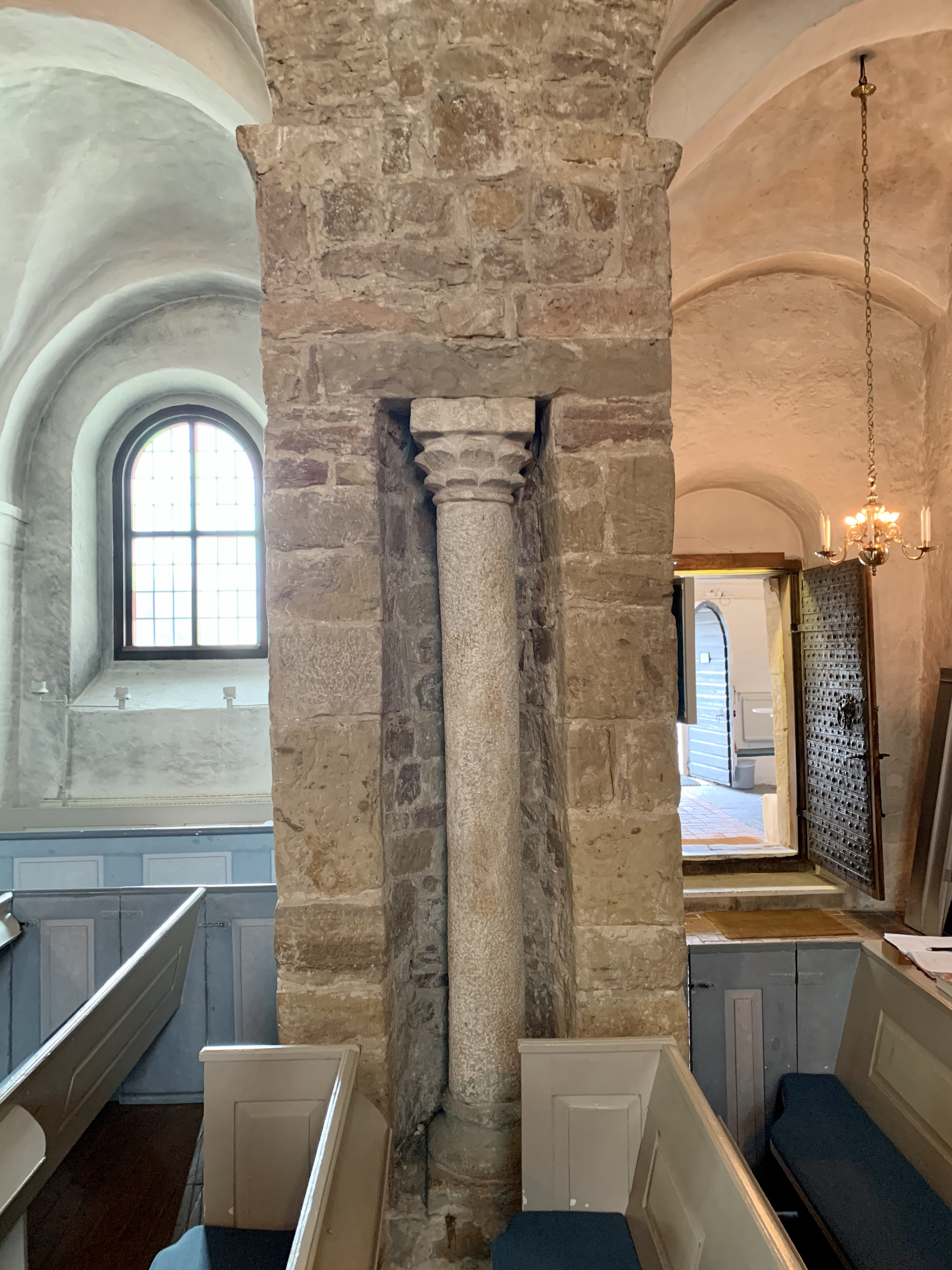
Romanesque representation of one of the pillars in Dalby Church, Sweden, 11th century

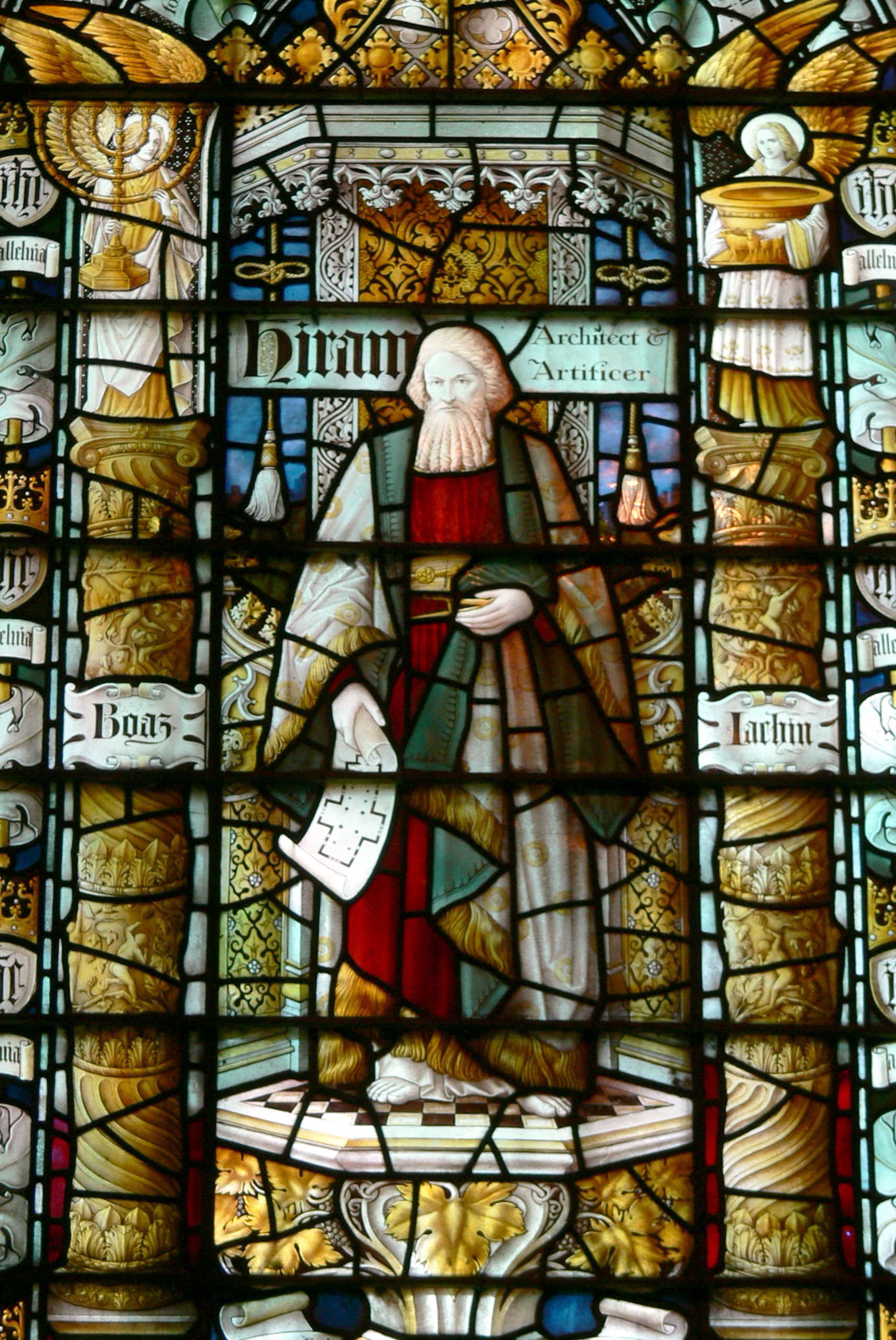
Hiram the Architect, in Freemasonry known as Hiram Abiff, flanked by the pillars. Stained glass window, St John's Church, Chester, 20th century

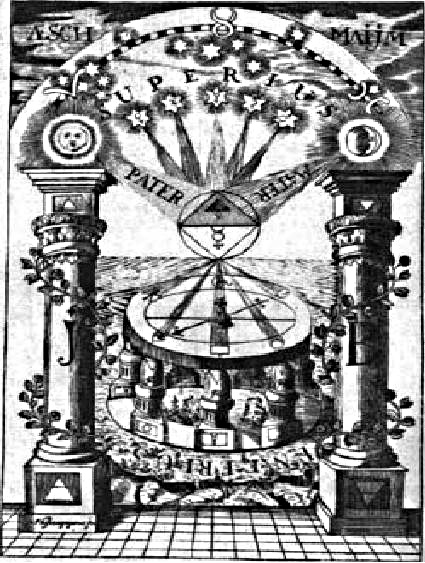
Illustration from The compass of the wise, a 1782 Rosicrucian book

== See also ==
- Asherah pole
- Bronze laver (Temple)
- Solomonic column
- Tree of life (Kabbalah)
