= Lillian Hoban =

American writer

- Born: Lillian Aberman; May 18, 1925; Philadelphia, Pennsylvania, U.S.
- Died: July 17, 1998 (aged 73); New York City, New York, U.S.
- Occupations: Writer, illustrator
- Spouse(s): Russell Hoban (1944–1975, divorced); 4 children (Phoebe, Abrom, Esmé, Julia)
- Writing career
- Notable awards: Boys Club Award; 1972; Lewis Carroll Shelf Award; Christopher Award 1972

Lillian Hoban (May 18, 1925 – July 17, 1998) was an American illustrator and children's writer best known for picture books created with her husband Russell Hoban. According to OCLC, she has published 326 works in 1,401 publications in 11 languages.

== Early life ==
Lillian Hoban was born in Philadelphia and was the youngest of three sisters. She attended the Philadelphia High School for Girls. At age 14, she started classes at the Graphic Sketch Club where she met her husband and collaborator, Russell Hoban. She won a scholarship to the Philadelphia Museum School of Art, where she majored in Illustration. After getting married and settling in New York City, Hoban gave up art to study dance at the Hanya Holm School. She studied dance for ten years.

== Career ==
Hoban danced professionally and choreographed the musical television program called Tropical Holiday that aired live on Saturday nights when, according to Hoban, television was in its infancy. She also taught dance for a number of years. She dedicated herself to dancing until the birth of her second child, Abrom (Brom).^{[2]}

=== Collaboration with Russell Hoban ===
Her earliest collaboration was with her husband Russell in the 1960s and early 1970s. The centerpiece of this work was the Frances series written by Russell. The character of Frances was inspired by the Hobans' next door neighbors in Norwalk whose daughter found many ways of putting off her bedtime.

==== Bedtime for Frances ====
The first book in the series, Bedtime for Frances, was illustrated by Garth Williams. Hoban, who illustrated his first book by Harper himself, sought another illustrator for Frances because, as he said, he could not do soft and cuddly. Ursula Nordstrom suggested Williams, whose soft and furry animals seemed the perfect fit. Russell originally depicted Frances as a vole, but Williams suggested a badger. Nordstrom agreed, persuading Russell that it would be too difficult to depict a likeable vole for children. The original illustrations of Frances as a vole can be found in the Lillian Hoban Collection at the Beinecke Rare Book and Manuscript Library at Yale University.

==== Other Frances books ====
Lillian took over as illustrator with the second book in the series, A Baby Sister for Frances, and illustrated the rest. She was faithful to the badger image first established by Garth Williams but brought her own style and charm to the badger family. Hoban used expressive body postures and facial gestures to capture the emotions of the characters and give them an authentic, true to life quality. The Hobans used their eldest daughter Phoebe as the model for Frances.

==== Themes and popularity of the Frances series ====
The theme that runs through all of the Frances books, and much of the Hobans' collaboration, is that problems can be resolved with just a little bit of thought and creativity. The feeling of a close, supportive, and loving family that is depicted through the illustrations and stories, according to Russell, is one of the reasons that the books have met with such widespread approval of readers and professionals. Another reason the author cites for the popularity of the series is that, beginning with the second Frances book, the title character creates and sings songs to express her emotions. Tamar Mays, senior editor of Harper Collins Children's book division, cites the loving kindness of the parents, the universal childhood moments, and the strong individuality and creative imagination of the character of Frances as reasons why the books have remained so popular.

==== I Can Read Frances books ====
The strong sales of A Bargain for Frances in the I-Can-Read format, led to the republishing of many of the rest of the titles originally published as picture books in this easy to read format: Bread and Jam for Frances (2008), Best Friends for Frances (2009), A Baby Sister for Frances (2011) and A Birthday for Frances (2012). Both Russell and his daughter Phoebe helped in this conversion.

==== Other Hoban collaborations ====
In all, the Hobans collaborated on at least twenty-seven children's books between 1964 and 1972. Other standouts in the Lillian and Russell collaboration include the Brute Family books: The Little Brute Family (1966) and The Stone Doll of Sister Brute (1968). The books tell the humorous and heartwarming tale of a mean-spirited family that discovers the contagiousness of a good feeling and niceness. Both books were reprinted as Dell paperbacks and The Little Brute Family was republished by Farrar, Straus and Giroux in 2002. Emmet Otter's Jug-Band Christmas, based on the short story The Gift of the Magi by O. Henry told the story Emmett Otter and his widowed mother who enter a talent contest to earn money to buy each other Christmas gifts. The book won the Christopher Award in 1972. In 1977 The Jim Henson Company produced the television film adaptation and a musical stage adaption in 2008. Emmet Otter's Jug-Band Christmas marked the Hobans' final collaborative effort.

=== Arthur the Chimpanzee ===
Lillian Hoban went on to find great success as an author and illustrator in the "I-Can-Read" books issued by Harper with early guidance from her long-time editor at Harper & Row, Ursula Nordstrom. Hoban explains that she did not set out to write an Easy Reader but simply wrote a story for children. Nordstrom loved the manuscript and fit it into the standard I-Can-Read format without changing a word. The Arthur series soon became wildly popular among children. Arthur the chimpanzee and his little sister Violet, explore many of the same trials and tribulations of childhood that she and her husband first explored with the Frances series. Hoban's first book in the series, Arthur's Christmas Cookies (1972), came from listening to her children baking cookies in the kitchen. Her son, Brom, devised a scheme to bake clay cookies, decorate them, and sell them for ornaments around the neighborhood to make money to buy Christmas gifts. In the book, Arthur makes clay cookies by mistake and then decides to make ornaments. Arthur's Honey Bear (1974) was also inspired by Hoban's experience with her own children who, along with the neighborhood kids, began selling their toys to each other. The activity led to a 2:00 am phone call from a concerned father who offered fifty dollars for Scooby-Doo because his son could not sleep without his security toy. Other popular titles written by Lillian Hoban in the I-Can-Read format include the Tilly the Mole and Mr. Pig books.

=== Riverside Kids series ===
Hoban illustrated the Riverside Kids series written by Johanna Hurwitz that explores growing up in an apartment in the heart of New York City. These titles include Busybody Nora, Superduper Teddy, Rip-Roaring Russell, and Elisa In The Middle. The last Riverside Kids book she illustrated was Ever-Clever Elisa published in 1997.

=== First Grade Friends series ===
Hoban was especially fond of the First Grade Friends series of books that she illustrated for Miriam Cohen. The series follows an entire classroom from pre-school to second grade. The first book in the series, Will I Have a Friend was published in 1967. Other titles in this series include Best Friends, The New Teacher, Tough Jim, and Starring First Grade. The last book in the series, and the only book that takes place in 2nd grade, was titled The Real Skin Monster Mask, and was published in 1990.

=== Juvenile fiction ===
Hoban briefly ventured into juvenile fiction with the publication of her one and only young adult novel, I Met a Traveler, in 1977. Inspired by a young Jewish girl she met while visiting Israel, the novel tells the story of an eleven-year-old girl from Connecticut taken to Jerusalem by her eccentric mother. Hoban had previously illustrated three other stories for older children, Mitchell F. Jayne's The Forest in the Wind (1966), Meindert Dejong's The Easter Cat (1971) and Russell Hoban's The Mouse and His Child (1967), the latter widely considered to be a classic.

=== The 1980s ===
The 1980s marked Hoban's most productive period as she illustrated over forty books, the most of any decade. This included four more Arthur books, five books in the Riverside Kids series and eleven books authored by Miriam Cohen.

==== Harry's Song ====
Hoban kicked off this very dynamic period with a small picture book entitled Harry's Song, her ode to the arts. Picasso once said, "The purpose of art is washing the dust of daily life off our souls." The book affirms that quote. It tells the story of Harry Rabbit who sits on a rock and sings his songs of summer under the darkening shadow of a fall day while the animals around him prepare for winter. One by one, the animals ridicule him for not helping his family in the practical duties of preparing for winter. The field mice call him a dreamer and dumb. Mr. Chipmunk calls him a funny little bunny. The brown bat calls him a bothersome, bumbling bunny and his mother's calls for him to come home as it is getting late. Harry continues his song under the thin moon. When Harry finally succumbs to his mother's pleadings and arrives at his house, his three brothers scold him for not bringing anything home. Harry corrects them. "Yes I have," he says and sings his song to the delight of his loving mother who exclaims, "How lovely! You've brought home the perfect song of a summer day to carry us through the winter. You are a honey of a bunny!"

==== No, No Sammy Crow ====
Hoban returned to familiar themes in No, No Sammy Crow (1981), telling the humorous and touching story of little Sammy Crow who cannot stop carrying around his baby blanket. His caring mother encourages him to find a solution to his attachment. In classic Hoban fashion, Sammy finds a creative resolution as he gives up his blanket to help hatch his new baby sibling. In the original typed manuscript, the last page of the book is handwritten on the manuscript (possibly a last-minute inspiration) that reveals how Sammy Crow secretly kept a small piece of the soft blanket in his pocket that he “niced” with his two fingers while his sister praised him for giving up his blanket. This final touch is Hoban at her finest, tuned in so sensitively and empathetically with the feelings of a young child. The guilty expression of self-indulgence on Sammy's face in the illustration tells all.

==== Silly Tilly series ====
In a departure from the themes of childhood she so often explored during her career, Hoban captured the endearing charm of an elderly woman who cannot seem to remember anything in the Silly Tilly books. One of the early drafts of the first book, Silly Tilly and the Easter Bunny (1987), was titled, Lizzie Mole. Later drafts show Grandma Mole lined out and replaced with Tillie Mole. The epithet Silly was added at some point before the final publication of the book. All three of the Silly Tilly books are set around the celebration of holidays, a fascination of Hoban's for much of her career that found their way into dozens of her books. In 1965 Hoban was commissioned, along with Robert Krauss and Anita Lobel, to create oversized posters for the various holidays to display in school libraries and classrooms. Hoban's posters included the following holidays: Halloween, Valentines, Christmas, George Washington and Abraham Lincoln (Robert Krauss illustrated the Easter poster and Anita Lobel, Thanksgiving). Holidays served as the basis of some of her very best work including her last Silly Tilly book, Silly Tilly's Valentine, that was published posthumously in December 1998, five months after her death.

==== Collaborations with her children ====
Other notable books that Hoban illustrated during this period include collaborations with two of her children. The Amy Loves series written by her daughter Julia portrays a child's joy at experiencing the changing seasons. The books include Amy Loves the Sun, Amy Loves the Wind, Amy Loves the Rain and Amy Loves the Snow, all published in 1989. Julia and Lillian followed those books with Buzby the cat (1990), an amusing and delightful story of a cat seeking his place in the world. Hoban also collaborated with her oldest daughter Phoebe Hoban on two books, Ready-Set-Robot! (1982), alternately titled The Messiest Robot in Zone One in the Weekly Book Club edition, and a second book, the Laziest Robot in Zone One (1983). Both books explore childhood traits and lessons in a futuristic setting. Hoban's son Brom illustrated The Sea-Thing Child (1972) authored by his father, Russell Hoban. He also wrote and illustrated three children's books. Although she did not collaborate with Brom on any of these books, Hoban encouraged him to write from personal experience after reading some of his early attempts that included fantasy plots and monsters. His book, October Fort (1981), was based on his own experience as child building a fort in his backyard.

== Artistic influence and philosophy ==
=== Early home life ===
Being raised in a family that valued reading, Hoban's interest in books and illustration started at an early age. Her earliest memories were of reading books in the living room with her two older sisters that they had brought home from the library while her parents read in their easy chairs. Many Sunday mornings as a young child she spent alone at the top of the stairs drawing Tillie the Toiler from the Sunday comics. Hoban's first thoughts that she would enjoy inventing and listening to stories were attributed to her older sister Sarah who had a fertile imagination and loved to tell her stories.

=== The Rittenhouse Square Library ===
Hoban's parents also encouraged her interest in drawing by taking her to museums, buying her art supplies and eventually enrolling her in the Graphic Sketch Club. Hoban's interest in drawing was further encouraged by her teachers at school. From third grade on, every Thursday afternoon she went to a special drawing class with other children who had been selected from elementary schools around Philadelphia. Hoban also recalls spending a great deal of time in the children's book room at the Rittenhouse Square Library in Philadelphia where there was a long, low bench under the bookshelves that wrapped around the room. This design made it easy for a child to reach the books on the shelves and then sit on the bench to read. Hoban spent countless hours at that library reading books.

=== Philosophy and technique ===
Hoban did not consider herself an expert draughtsman. The first step in her illustration of characters, she explains, is capturing expression. She explains that in preparing an illustration she will first practice making multiple expressions until she finds the one that best fits the character and situation. This process created many a humorous moment for her small children when they would sneak into her home studio and find their mother making faces in the mirror. Much of her early books were printed in two colors plus black. The illustrations were created through a tedious process known as three-color separation. She most often chose the primary colors of red and yellow. Through the overlay process, she was able to make purple (red over black), green (yellow over black), orange (yellow over red). Hoban was delighted when the books started to be published in full color and she used pastels, water colors, and colored pencils sometimes in the same picture. See A Bargain for Frances, 1970 (three color separation) and the same title reprinted in 1992 in full color. Language, however, is first and foremost for Hoban as an author. The sound of the words, the rhythm of the sentences must sound natural and pleasing to her ear and the ear of a child.

Lillian Hoban died at Presbyterian Hospital in Manhattan in 1998 (aged 73) from heart failure.^{[1]}

== Works ==
=== Selected books for children ===
Author and Illustrator

- Arthur's Back to School Day. HarperCollins. 1996
- Arthur's Birthday Party. HarperCollins. 1999
- Arthur's Camp-Out. HarperCollinsPublishers. 1993
- Arthur's Christmas Cookies. Harper & Row. 1972
- Arthur's Funny Money. Harper & Row. 1981
- Arthur's Great Big Valentine. HarperCollins. 1989
- Arthur's Halloween Costume. Harper & Row. 1984
- Arthur's Honey Bear. Harper & Row. 1974
- Arthur's Loose Tooth. Harper & Row. 1985
- Arthur's Pen Pal. Harper & Row. 1976
- Arthur's Prize Reader. Harper & Row. 1978
- Big Little Lion, Harper Festival. 1997
- Big Little Otter, Harper-Collins. 1997
- Harry's Song, Greenwillow. 1980
- Here Come Raccoons!, Holt-Rinehart-Winston. 1977
- I Met a Traveler, Harper and Row. 1977
- It's Really Christmas, Greenwillow. 1982
- Joe & Betsy and the Dinosaurs, Harper Collins. 1995
- Mr. Pig and Family, Harper and Row. 1980
- Mr. Pig and Sonny Too, Harper and Row. 1977
- No, No, Sammy Crow, Greenwillow. 1981
- Silly Tilly and the Easter Bunny. Harper & Row. 1987.
- Silly Tilly's Thanksgiving Dinner. Harper & Row. 1990.
- Silly Tilly's Valentine. HarperCollins. 1998.
- Stick-in-the-Mud Turtle, Morrow. 1977
- The Case of the Two Masked Robbers, Harper and Row. 1986
- The Sugar Snow Spring, Harper and Row. 1973
- Turtle Spring, Greenwillow/World's Work. 1978

Authored by Russell Hoban

- A Baby Sister for Frances, Harper and Row. 1964
- A Bargain for Frances, Harper and Row. 1970
- A Birthday for Frances, Harper and Row. 1968
- Best Friends for Frances, Harper and Row. 1969
- Bread and Jam for Frances, Harper and Row. 1964
- Charlie the Tramp, Scholastic. 1966
- Egg Thoughts and Other Frances Songs, Harper and Row. 1972
- Emmet Otter's Jug-Band Christmas, Parent's Magazine Press. 1971
- Goodnight, W.W. Norton inc.1966
- Harvey's Hideout, Parent's Magazine Press. 1969
- Henry and the Monstrous Din, World's Work. 1966
- Herman the Loser, Harper and Brothers. 1961
- London Men and English Men, Harper and Row. 1962
- Nothing to Do, Harper and Row. 1964
- Save My Place, W.W. Norton inc. 1967
- Some Snow Said Hello, Harper & Row. 1963
- The Little Brute Family, Macmillan. 1966
- The Mole Family's Christmas, Parent's Magazine Press. 1969
- The Mouse and His Child, Harper and Row. 1967
- The Pedaling Man and Other Poems, W.W. Norton inc. 1968
- The Song in My Drum, Harper and Brothers. 1962
- The Sorely Trying Day, Harper and Row. 1964
- The Stone Doll of Sister Brute. Macmillan. 1968
- Tom and the Two Handles, Harper and Row. 1965
- Ugly Bird, Macmillan. 1969
- What Happened When Jack and Daisy Tried to Fool the Tooth Fairies, Four Winds Press. 1965

Authored by Miriam Cohen

- Bee My Valentine, Greenwillow. 1978
- Best Friends, Macmillan. 1971
- Don't Eat Too Much Turkey, Greenwillow. 1987
- First Grade Takes a Test, Greenwillow. 1980
- It's George, Greenwillow. 1988
- Jim Meets the Thing, Greenwillow. 1981
- Jim's Dog's Muffins, Greenwillow. 1984
- Liar, Liar, Pants on Fire! Greenwillow. 1985
- Lost in the Museum, Greenwillow. 1979
- No Good in Art, Greenwillow. 1980
- See You in Second Grade, Greenwillow. 1989
- See You Tomorrow, Charles. Greenwillow. 1983
- So What? Greenwillow. 1982
- Starring First Grade, Greenwillow. 1985
- The New Teacher, Macmillan. 1972
- The Real-Skin Monster Mask, Greenwillow. 1990
- Tough Jim, Macmillan. 1974
- When Will I Read? Greenwillow. 1977
- Will I Have a Friend? Macmillan. 1967

Authored by Johanna Hurwitz

- Busybody Nora, William Morrow. 1990
- "E" is for Elisa, William Morrow. 1991
- Elisa in the Middle, William Morrow. 1995
- Every-Clever Elisa, William Morrow. 1997
- Make Room for Elisa, William Morrow. 1993
- New Neighbors for Nora, William Morrow. 1991
- Nora and Mrs. Mind-Your-Own-Business, William Morrow. 1991
- Rip-Roaring Russell, William Morrow. 1983
- Russell and Elisa, William Morrow. 1989
- Russell Rides Again, William Morrow. 1985
- Russell Sprouts, William Morrow. 1987
- Superduper Teddy, William Morrow. 1980

Authored by Marjorie Weinman Sharmat

- Attila the Angry, Holiday House. 1985
- I Don't Care, Macmillan. 1977
- Say Hello, Vanessa, Holiday House. 1979
- Sophie and Gussie, Macmillan. 1973
- The Story of Bentley Beaver, Harper and Row. 1984
- The Trip and Other Sophie and Gussie Stories, Macmillan. 1976

Co-authored with Phoebe Hoban

- Ready-Set-Robot!, Harper & Row. 1982
- The Laziest Robot in Zone One, Harper & Row. 1983

== Personal life ==
The Hobans raised their four children, Phoebe, Brom, Julia and Esmé, in Norwalk, Connecticut before moving to a rural two-and-a-half-acre property in Wilton, Connecticut. The Hobans moved to London in 1969. Within a year, the marriage had become strained. Lillian and the children soon moved back to Wilton while Russell stayed in London and remarried in 1975. Lillian began writing her own stories upon returning to the United States. She based her tales on her experiences with her children and their neighborhood friends.^{[1]}

Lillian Hoban died at Presbyterian Hospital in Manhattan in 1998 (aged 73) from heart failure.^{[1]}
