= Basquiat (disambiguation) =

Basquiat refers to:

- Jean-Michel Basquiat (1960–1988), American artist
  - Basquiat (film), a 1996 American biographical film
  - Basquiat: A Quick Killing in Art, a 1998 biography
  - Jean-Michel Basquiat: The Radiant Child, a 2010 documentary film
  - Basquiat: Rage to Riches, a 2017 documentary film
  - "Basquiat" (song), a 2020 song by South Korean band Pentagon
