= Emmet Otter's Jug-Band Christmas (book) =

1971 book by Russell Hoban

- First edition of Emmet Otter's Jug-Band Christmas
- Author: Russell Hoban
- Language: English
- Publication date: 1971
- LC Class: PZ10.3.H646 Em

Emmet Otter's Jug-Band Christmas is a 1971 children's book written by Russell Hoban and illustrated by Lillian Hoban. It was adapted for a Muppets television special of the same name in 1977.

== Russell Hoban storybook ==
Emmet Otter's Jug-Band Christmas was written by Russell Hoban and illustrated by his then-wife, Lillian Hoban, in 1969. The book was published in 1971 by Parents' Magazine Press. The story tells of Emmet Otter and his Ma, a widow who scrapes by on the small amount of money she gets from doing laundry and that Emmet gets from doing odd jobs around their home in the town of Frogtown Hollow despite both of them often being cheated. Some of the people who cheated them are Old Lady Possum and Gretchen Fox (the wife of Mayor Harrison Fox). As Christmas approaches, they hear of a talent contest in the nearby town of Waterville, and separately decide to enter to buy nice presents for each other—a nice guitar for Emmet, or a piano for Ma. However, in a twist on The Gift of the Magi by O. Henry, they must sacrifice each other's livelihood for the talent contest. Ma hocks Emmet's tools for dress fabric while Emmet turns Ma's washtub into a washtub bass for a jug band.

== Jim Henson musical stage adaptation ==
In 2008, the Jim Henson Company partnered with iTheatrics to develop a musical stage adaptation of the 1977 special. The musical featured a mix of stage actors, puppet characters and songs. Paul Williams wrote new songs specifically for the stage show. Tim A. McDonald and Christopher Gattelli adapted the story for the stage, and Gattelli directed the production. It premiered in a limited-run engagement on December 7, 2008, at the Goodspeed Opera House in East Haddam, Connecticut, and closed on January 4, 2009. The cast featured Daniel Reichard (Emmet Otter), Cass Morgan (Ma Otter), Alan Campbell (Pa Otter), Kate Wetherhead (Jane), Lisa Howard (Mrs. Gretchen Fox), and Jeff Hiller (Will Possum). The musical returned on December 5, 2009, and ran through January 3, 2010.
