= New Shoes for Silvia =

1993 picture book by Johanna Hurwitz

- First edition cover of New Shoes for Silvia, designed by Jerry Pinkney
- Author: Johanna Hurwitz
- Illustrator: Jerry Pinkney
- Language: English
- Genre: Children's literature, picture book
- Published: 1993 (William Morrow)
- Publication place: USA
- Media type: Print (hardback)
- Pages: 48 (unpaginated)
- ISBN: 9780688052874
- OCLC: 762130210

New Shoes for Silvia is a 1993 Children's picture book by Johanna Hurwitz and illustrator Jerry Pinkney. It is about a girl, Silvia, who receives a present of a pair of red shoes that are too large for her, and what she does with them until many months later when they finally fit her.

== Reception ==
Booklist, in a review of New Shoes for Silvia, wrote "The slight story is made stronger by Pinkney's watercolors, which warmly depict a close family life in a wholesome, often outdoor setting in Latin America." School Library Journal wrote "This simple story, told in spare prose, speaks universally to the imagination and emotions. Pinkney's spirited watercolors animate the narrative and are large enough for group sharing."

New Shoes for Silvia has also been reviewed by Kirkus Reviews, Publishers Weekly, and The Horn Book Magazine
