= Chapter book =

Children's book divided into chapters

A chapter book is a story book intended for intermediate readers, generally age 7–10. Unlike picture books for beginning readers, a chapter book tells the story primarily through prose rather than pictures. Unlike books for advanced readers, chapter books contain plentiful illustrations. The name refers to the fact that the stories are usually divided into short chapters, which provide readers with opportunities to stop and resume reading if their attention spans are not long enough to finish the book in one sitting. Chapter books are usually works of fiction of moderate length and complexity.

== Examples ==
- Flat Stanley (1964) by Jeff Brown
- Busybody Nora (1976) by Johanna Hurwitz
