= Soonchild =

2012 book by Russell Hoban

- Front cover of first edition
- Author: Russell Hoban
- Illustrator: Alexis Deacon
- Language: English
- Genre: Children's fantasy novel, supernatural fiction
- Publisher: Walker Books
- Publication date: March 2012
- Publication place: United Kingdom
- Media type: Print (hardcover)
- Pages: 141 pp (first edition)
- ISBN: 978-1-4063-2991-9
- OCLC: 766326714
- LC Class: PZ7.H637 Soo 2012

Soonchild is a fantasy novel for young adults written by Russell Hoban, first published by Walker in March 2012 with illustrations by Alexis Deacon. Set somewhere north of the Arctic Circle, it is based partly on Inuit mythology.

Soonchild is the last novel Hoban completed before his death in December 2011. Robert Dunbar wrote in The Irish Times that it "acts as a poignant coda to the body of work that preceded it."

Walker's North American division Candlewick Press published an edition released 14 August 2012, retaining the Deacon illustrations.

== Plot summary ==
Soonchild tells the story of a shaman known as Sixteen-Face John, who lives in a cold, snowy region referred to as "The North," and who fears he is losing his way in the modern world. He increasingly spends his time "drinking Coca-Cola and watching TV with his feet up and reading magazines with centrefolds in them." John's wife is expecting a baby whom they plan to name Soonchild, but a crisis occurs when Soonchild refuses to leave the womb because she can't hear the "World Songs" – a special kind of music that is necessary for the world to exist, and which all children must hear before they can be born.

To coax his daughter out into the world, John is forced to embark on a shamanic quest to find out why the World Songs have disappeared and bring them home so Soonchild can hear them. In the course of this journey he travels into the spirit world and the realm of the dead, where he must face down demons and enlist the aid of a variety of animal spirits and other mysterious characters – including Nanuk the giant polar bear, Old Man Raven, Ukpika the owl-woman, Yarluk the killer whale, Timertik the walrus, and the spirit of his great-grandmother who was a shaman herself.

== Reception ==
Soonchild has received enthusiastically positive reviews.

Writing in The Guardian, Tony Bradman praised the story's "timeless quality," and added: "Ignore the references to Coke and magazines, and you could be reading an Inuit legend, shot full of wryness and wit and with deep insight into human nature ... Alexis Deacon's moody pencil illustrations add a haunting counterpoint to the magical realism of the story, and have their own moments of wit."

In The Daily Telegraph, Tim Martin called it "a work aimed even more squarely at the great imponderables than many of Hoban's recent adult novels," admiring "Hoban's sprightly narration and a cast of supernatural potentates who swap banter about the yawning vastnesses of the human soul with the wry pragmatism of a team of garage mechanics."

In a starred review, Publishers Weekly wrote that "Hoban fearlessly tackles the big questions: the distinction between the real and the unreal, the nature of courage, and the debt humans owe the dead and the unborn ... Hoban's fans will revel in this last tale of his."

Several critics have addressed the question of whether Soonchild, with its complex, grown-up themes, is really a book for adolescent readers. The Daily Telegraph review concludes: "Soonchild is being marketed as a young adult book, which I'm not convinced that it really is. But any adolescent who'll appreciate this thoughtful, juicy piece of mythmaking is on the way to being a very wise grown-up indeed."

Soonchild was one of eight books on the longlist for the 2012 Guardian Children's Fiction Prize. The Prize is judged by a panel of children's writers and annually recognises one British children's novel by an author who has not won it.
