= Pilgermann =

1983 novel by Russell Hoban

- First edition (publ. Jonathan Cape)
- Author: Russell Hoban
- Publisher: Summit Books
- Publication date: 1983
- Pages: 240
- ISBN: 0671459686

Pilgermann is a 1983 novel by Russell Hoban, set in the Middle Ages and depicting the journey of a Jew across Europe and North Africa on his way to the Holy Land. The novel was reissued in January 2002.

== Plot summary ==
Narrated by the disembodied spirit or consciousness of Pilgermann, a European Jew, the novel opens with the newly castrated Pilgermann having a vision of Christ after sleeping with a merchant's wife and subsequently being mutilated by a gentile mob. Christ tells Pilgermann that he must make his way to Jerusalem where he will meet with Sophia, so Pilgermann sets off.

As Pilgermann travels across Europe he is joined by other characters, including his own Death which walks alongside him. Life in Europe is seen through a series of grotesque, Brueghel- and Bosch-like images of horror, violence, degradation, and death. Nevertheless, Pilgermann continues.

Halfway across the Mediterranean, Pilgermann's boat is ambushed by pirates who sell him to a Muslim grandee named Bembel Redzuk, in the city of Antioch in ancient Syria. Pilgermann and Bembel become friends, although never social equals (as a Jew, Pilgermann can only ever be a dhimmi in Muslim society). Pilgermann ideates, designs, and builds a Kabbalistic courtyard and tower with a patterned design on the floor for Bembel. This rapidly takes on numinous power among the community, attracting the displeasure of the Islamic authorities. Things come to a head when Frankish crusaders besiege Antioch. As it becomes increasingly clear that the city will fall, the Islamic authorities become more and more suspicious of non-Muslims, and Pilgermann's life becomes increasingly threatened. Finally, the city falls and Bembel and Pilgermann are killed fighting a crusader, but not before Pilgermann has a vision of Jerusalem – which he is never destined to get to – and sees Sophia, dying among a pile of corpses after a crusader massacre.

== Major themes ==
Pilgermann is a historical fantasy that deals with the relationship between Judaism, Christianity, and Islam. At the time of the book's setting, Islam was the most technologically and culturally advanced of the three cultures, and this is reflected in the comparatively sympathetic portrayal of Bembel and Muslim society as opposed to the brutality and hardship of European Christian life.

The book is suffused with Kabbalistic, Sufi, and Christian mystical imagery, including references to the Tarot, the work of artists such as Brueghel and Bosch, the Gnostic idea of the Sophia, and many others. The European scenes are often reminiscent of Ingmar Bergman's film The Seventh Seal. It was written after Hoban's post-apocalyptic novel Riddley Walker, which portrayed a future state for the world reminiscent of the Middle Ages.

== Reception ==
The New York Times said Pilgermann was wonderful despite not outperforming Hoban's previous book Riddley Walker, while Kirkus Reviews had mixed opinions about the book.

Dave Langford reviewed Pilgermann for White Dwarf #54, and stated that "Pilgermann is part historical novel, part fantasy (Pilgermann converses with dead folk, Christ and Death himself), part theological, wholly recommended."
