= Phoebe Hoban =

American journalist

Phoebe Hoban is an American journalist who has written biographies of the artists Jean Michel Basquiat (Basquiat: A Quick Killing in Art, Viking 1998), Alice Neel (Alice Neel: The Art of not Sitting Pretty, St. Martin's Press 2010), and Lucian Freud (Lucian Freud: Eyes Wide Open, Houghton Mifflin Harcourt 2014). As a print journalist Hoban has written articles on culture and the arts for Vogue, Vanity Fair, GQ, Harper's Bazaar, New York magazine, The New York Times, Riot Material magazine, ARTnews, and numerous other periodicals.

She is the daughter of the writer Russell Hoban (1925–2011) and writer and illustrator Lillian Hoban (1925–1998). Her parents divorced in 1975.

Early in the 1980s, Lillian and Phoebe Hoban co-wrote two science fiction books for beginning readers, illustrated by Lillian: Ready-set-robot! (Harper & Row, 1982), reissued as The Messiest Robot in Zone One, and The Laziest Robot in Zone One (Harper & Row, 1983).
