= Kleinzeit =

1974 novel by Russell Hoban

- First edition
- Author: Russell Hoban
- Language: English
- Genre: Speculative fiction, Philosophical novel
- Publisher: Jonathan Cape
- Publication date: 1974
- Publication place: United Kingdom
- Media type: Print (Hardback)
- Pages: 191 pp
- ISBN: 0-224-00964-8
- OCLC: 923213
- Dewey Decimal: 813/.5/4
- LC Class: PZ4.H6797 Kl PS3558.O336

Kleinzeit is a metaphysical novel by Russell Hoban.

== Plot introduction ==
Hoban's second novel for adults, Kleinzeit is a story detailing the eponymous title character's brush with illness and creativity. When Kleinzeit is fired from his job as an advertising copy-writer, he ends up in hospital with a ‘skewed hypotenuse’, being tended by the healthy and desirable Sister. Together, they embark on a strange adventure, in which Kleinzeit struggles to get better, attempts to master his creative urges, and holds conversations with a variety of abstract concepts. The central character shares many traits with Hoban himself, and the author has commented: ‘I think there's most of me in Kleinzeit’.

== Characters in Kleinzeit ==
- Kleinzeit – the central character, whose name means ‘smalltime’ in German
- Sister – a nurse at the hospital, who begins a relationship with Kleinzeit
- Redbeard – a homeless busker who leaves Kleinzeit a sheet of yellow paper, and ends up in the same hospital ward

== Major themes ==
Kleinzeit's physical illness and his creative urges are linked in the novel, an identification strengthened by the fact that all the diseases suffered by patients on Kleinzeit's ward (ward A4, like the paper) are literary, geometric or musical terms: he himself has a painful hypotenuse and diapason and develops a faulty stretto, while other patients suffer from hendiadys or ‘imbricated noumena’. The terror and allure of creativity are symbolised by the mysterious yellow paper, which Redbeard passes on to Kleinzeit. Kleinzeit's relationship with a blank piece of paper is depicted as a sexual romance, with the writing process seen as a consummation, albeit that Kleinzeit is cuckolded by the personification of Word. Many abstract concepts are similarly personified, including Death, Hospital, the (London) Underground (which is associated with the myth of Orpheus), Action and God.

== Allusions/references to other works ==
As with many of Hoban's works, a number of other literary and mythical works are referred to, including:

- the myth of Orpheus and Eurydice
- John Milton's poem L'Allegro (which itself refers to Orpheus and Eurydice)
- Thucydides's work the History of the Peloponnesian War

== Release details ==
- 1974, London: Jonathan Cape ISBN 0-224-00964-8
- 2002, London: Bloomsbury ISBN 0-7475-5641-5, paperback

== See also ==
- The Medusa Frequency (1987), a subsequent Russell Hoban book which also reinterprets the myth of Orpheus and Eurydice
