= Dinner at Alberta's =

Book by Russell Hoban

- Original hardback cover, 1975
- Author: Russell Hoban
- Illustrator: James Marshall
- Language: English
- Genre: Children's literature
- Publisher: Dell, Penguin Books, Red Fox
- Publication date: 1975
- Publication place: United Kingdom
- Media type: Print (hardback)
- Pages: 36
- ISBN: 9780440418641

Dinner at Alberta's is a children's book written by Anglo American author Russell Hoban. Aimed at the pre-middle grade reader, it was originally published in 1972 but has had various editions by Red Fox and Penguin Books in 1992. It was illustrated by James Marshall.

== Plot ==
Arthur Crocodile has very dubious table manners, playing with the cruet set while waiting for his food and splashing ravioli sauce on his sister. He refuses to do anything about it until his sister invites her new best friend, Alberta, for dinner and Arthur sets out to impress her.

== Critical reception ==
Dinner at Alberta's garnered mostly favourable reviews on publication. Kirkus Reviews called it "Sly and scampish". It describes the pairing of Hoban and Marshall as a match made in heaven.
