= Turtle Diary =

1985 film by John Irvin

- Theatrical release poster
- Directed by: John Irvin
- Screenplay by: Harold Pinter
- Based on: Turtle Diary by Russell Hoban
- Produced by: Richard Johnson
- Starring: Glenda Jackson; Ben Kingsley
- Cinematography: Peter Hannan
- Edited by: Peter Tanner
- Music by: Geoffrey Burgon
- Distributed by: Rank Film Distributors
- Release date: 29 November 1985 (UK)
- Running time: 97 minutes
- Country: United Kingdom
- Language: English
- Box office: $2.2 million

Turtle Diary is a 1985 British film directed by John Irvin and starring Glenda Jackson, Ben Kingsley, and Michael Gambon. Based on a screenplay adapted by Harold Pinter from Russell Hoban's novel Turtle Diary, the film is about "people rediscovering the joys of life and love". It has been described as an unusually serious variation on the romantic comedy form in which the central relationship is a platonic one.

== Plot ==
Two lonely Londoners – Neaera Duncan, a children's author (Glenda Jackson), and William Snow, a bookstore assistant (Ben Kingsley) – find common ground when visiting the sea turtles at London Zoo. Independently, each perceives that the turtles are unnaturally confined, and they hatch a plan with the assistance of zookeeper George Fairbairn (Michael Gambon) to smuggle them out and release them into the sea.

Their release of the turtles is a metaphor for their escape from their inhibitions.

== Cast ==
- Glenda Jackson as Neaera Duncan, a "Popular children's author … fearing her creative talents have evaporated, [who] escapes into the dreamy world of sea turtles seeking inspiration in their beauty and grace."
- Ben Kingsley as William Snow, "a humble assistant in a bookstore where he, too, dreams of the turtles."
- Richard Johnson as Mr. Johnson, a neighbor of Neaera Duncan
- Michael Gambon as George Fairbairn, the zookeeper charged with caring for the turtles
- Jeroen Krabbé as Mr. Sandor, a neighbor of William Snow
- Rosemary Leach as Mrs. Charlie Inchcliff, Williams Snow's landlady
- Eleanor Bron as Miss Neap, a neighbor of William Snow
- Harriet Walter as Harriet Simms, a colleague of William Snow at the bookstore
- Nigel Hawthorne as the publisher of books by Neaera Duncan

Harold Pinter has a cameo role as a man in the bookshop where William and Harriet work.

== Production ==
The film was made by United British Artists.

== Critical reception and analysis ==
In his 1985 review of the film for The Sunday Telegraph, David Castell observes that Pinter's screenplay concentrates on developing dialogue and plot, leaving clues for the actors to convey their characters' subtle emotional and psychological development: "It is hard to think of two actors better matched to play Pinter than Glenda Jackson and Ben Kingsley. They milk every nuance, point up every missed beat and relish each irony and repetition in the script… Turtle Diary is a fine film that charts movingly the unnoticed despair of everyday lives, the sufferings of those who endure loneliness in silence." The Washington Post gave the film a positive review, describing it as a "quietly optimistic chamber comedy by Harold Pinter, whose script is delicately acted by Ben Kingsley and Glenda Johnson as two lonely Londoners living lives of quiet desperation and all that."

The film grossed $2.2 million on its American theatrical release. It was one of the most successful films from United British Artists. On the review aggregator website Rotten Tomatoes, 82% of 11 critics' reviews are positive.

Russell Hoban later said, in a 1995 interview, that he felt the film was "feeble and flabby compared to the book" and an case of an adaptation oversimplifying its source, omitting too much of the characters' inner thoughts and other "detail that really was the solid foundation for the story."

== Home video ==
The film was released on videocassette in 1985 by Vestron Video. The film has not been released on DVD.
