= The Mouse and His Child =

1967 children's novel by Russell Hoban

- First edition (publ. Harper & Row)
- Author: Russell Hoban
- Illustrator: Lillian Hoban
- Language: English
- Published: 1967
- Publication place: USA
- Pages: 181
- OCLC: 307157
- LC Class: 67019624

The Mouse and His Child is a novel by Russell Hoban first published in 1967 with illustrations by Lillian Hoban. It has been described as "a classic of children's literature and is the book for which Hoban is best known." It was adapted into an animated film in 1977. A new edition illustrated by David Small was released in 2001 by Arthur A. Levine Books.

The titular characters are a pair of toy mice, joined by the hands and operated by clockwork. The story tells of their beginning in a toy store, their purchase and eventual discarding, their pursuit by a malicious rat, and their quest to become self-winding.

Like E. B. White's Charlotte's Web, the book contrasts with much of children's literature by its occasional advanced vocabulary and willingness to include adult themes.
