= Baseball Fever =

1981 novel by Johanna Hurwitz

- Author: Johanna Hurwitz
- Illustrator: Ray Cruz
- Language: English
- Genre: Novel; Realistic fiction
- Publisher: William Morrow and Company
- Publication date: 1981
- Publication place: United States
- Media type: Print (hardback and paperback)
- Pages: 128
- ISBN: 0-688-00710-4

Baseball Fever (Note: The title refers to the protagonist (Ezra Feldman) and his obsession of baseball; however, it may also refer to his educative father and his depicted sourness of Ezra and his addiction to baseball.) is an American children’s novel written by Johanna Hurwitz and published in 1981 by William Morrow and Company.

It features Ezra Feldman as the protagonist, depicted as having an obsession with baseball. The book is primarily centered on Ezra, and his struggle to get his scholarly father interested in baseball, his father loathing it and instead preferring chess and sociology.

The book is set primarily in Flushing, New York, although the story includes Princeton, New Jersey, and other locations.

== Development ==
Johanna Hurwitz conceived the book after realizing that her children were "obsessed" with baseball; (Note: It is stated on the eighth page of the novel that the book was developed from baseball enthusiasts Ben and Nomi Hurwitz.) the plot developed into a situation between a father and a son.
