= The Medusa Frequency =

1987 novel by Russell Hoban

- First edition
- Author: Russell Hoban
- Cover artist: Johannes Vermeer, Girl with a Pearl Earring 1987 cover painted after Vermeer by artist Frances Broomfield
- Language: English
- Publisher: Jonathan Cape
- Publication date: 1987
- Publication place: Great Britain
- Media type: Print (Hardback & Paperback)
- Pages: 143
- ISBN: 0-7475-5909-0

The Medusa Frequency is a 1987 novel by Russell Hoban. Written in a lyrical, often magic realist style, it crosses a number of genres including comedy and fantasy. It uses the story of Orpheus to "meditate on art and reality and love and fear and fidelity and betrayal".

== Plot summary ==
Narrator Herman Orff is a London-based freelance writer of comics and an unsuccessful novelist. He is preoccupied by Vermeer's Girl with a Pearl Earring, an ex-girlfriend called Luise von Himmelbett, and characters from mythology including The Kraken. His own name is a reference to Hermes and Orpheus.

Lacking inspiration to write his third novel, he responds to a leaflet put through his letterbox advertising a treatment for blocked artists. The procedure turns out to be the invention of an old friend who was once also Luise's lover. Following the treatment, Orff periodically hallucinates, finding that spherical found objects (a stone on the banks of the River Thames, a football, a cabbage) appear to him as the severed head of Orpheus. Through a series of surreal scenes, the head tells Orff its "story", namely how he started playing the lyre, met Eurydice and lost her. In Hoban's retelling, Eurydice was not bitten by a snake and did not descend to the Underworld, but rather Orpheus was unfaithful to her and she left him for Aristaeus. This reflects Orff's own experience of being unfaithful to Luise.

The scenes retelling the Orpheus myth are interspersed with Orff's daily life as he finds a new girlfriend, is hospitalised after suffering an attack of angina, bumps repeatedly into a character referred to as "Gom Yawncher" who turns up in various guises throughout London, and travels to The Hague to see the Vermeer painting in the Mauritshuis. When he gets to The Hague he finds the painting is on loan to the US, and meets a man in the gallery who claims to be another of Luise's ex-lovers. On returning to his hotel he unexpectedly bumps into Luise herself, who he finds is happily married.

On Orff's return to London, his new girlfriend breaks up with him. Orff turns down lucrative offers of work adapting the Orpheus myth into a tacky cartoon strip and a pretentious film, and instead develops his own original science fiction comic strip. The Orpheus hallucinations come to an end and the slim memoir of this strange story effectively becomes the third novel he has been trying to write.

== Interpretation ==
The novel's title is on one level a reference to Orff's preference for sitting up late at night listening to female classical singers on shortwave radio. During one of Orff's "conversations" with The Kraken, it tells him that Medusa is the only woman, or female archetype, to whom he can be truly faithful.

== Reception ==
Although never a big seller, the book was well received critically, with The Listener commenting: "in the course of this tour through the imaginative outback of Mr. Hoban's mind, we are treated to brilliant flashes of mordant humour, not to mention splendidly baroque evocations of present day London" while The New York Times remarked "There's a sense of wonder in these passages...a love of fantasy and myth-making, an interest in language and puns, and a concern with philosophic speculation and the pyrotechnics of storytelling."

Dave Langford reviewed The Medusa Frequency for White Dwarf #99, and stated that "The book is souffle rather cornflakes: a light and tasty treatment of material which could be depressingly Heavy."

== Crossovers ==
Most of Hoban's novels explore common themes and are set in the same area of west London. Characters from The Medusa Frequency made brief appearances in Hoban's later novels Fremder and Linger Awhile.

== See also ==
- Kleinzeit (1974), Russell Hoban's second novel, which also utilised the Orpheus and Eurydice motif
