= Turtle Diary (novel) =

1975 novel by Russell Hoban

Turtle Diary is a 1975 British book by author Russell Hoban.

Set in London, the novel concerns two lonely middle-aged people who unexpectedly form a connection over captive green turtles.

The novel was later reissued by NYRB Classics and Penguin Modern Classics in the U.S. and the U.K. respectively.

== Summary ==
William G. is a divorced book seller who is estranged from his two daughters. Wandering into the London Zoo aquarium he is drawn to a set of green turtles and begins to learn about them. At the same time, popular children's author Neaera H. is similarly drawn to the green turtles. Independently each befriends the turtle keeper, George Fairbairn, and asks about freeing the turtles. Surprisingly Fairbairn is amenable to the idea.

William and Neaera meet when Neaera goes to William's bookshop. Each recognizes in the other a kindred spirit and though neither is seeking to make a connection they reluctantly decide to collaborate to help Fairburn free the turtles.

On the appointed day, William and Neaera rent a truck and travel to Polperro where Neaera had suggested launching the turtles, unaware that the town is the one William was born in. Their mission is a success and they are both briefly elated, though returning to London both drop their connection.

Each feels that despite their initial euphoria the turtles have not changed them in any substantial way. However Neaera begins a relationship with George while William ends one he had with his coworker, Harriet, and physically fights Sandor, one of the fellow boarders at his rooming house.

== Reception ==
Kirkus Reviews praised the novel as "Immensely entertaining." Ed Park, who wrote the introduction to the NYRB Classics 2013 reprint, called it "The Lost Great Novel of Middle Age". Bookforum called the novel "a quiet masterpiece".

== Adaptations ==
In 1985 the book was adapted into a film of the same name starring Glenda Jackson and Ben Kingsley.

The BBC adapted Turtle Diary for radio in 2003, in the Saturday Play series, starring Geraldine James and Bill Nighy. In 2025, BBC Radio 4 aired a second Turtle Diary broadcast for the novel's 50th anniversary; this was an abridged reading rather than an adaptation.
