= Class President (children's book) =

1990 picture book by Johanna Hurwitz

- First edition
- Author: Johanna Hurwitz
- Illustrator: Sheila Hamanaka
- Cover artist: Hamanaka
- Language: English
- Genre: Children's literature, picture book
- Published: 1990 (William Morrow)
- Publication place: USA
- Media type: Print (hardback)
- ISBN: 9780688091149

Class President is a 1990 children's picture book written by American author Johanna Hurwitz and illustrated by Sheila Hamanaka.
