= Riddley Walker =

1980 novel by Russell Hoban

- First edition
- Author: Russell Hoban
- Language: English (fictional dialect)
- Genre: Science fiction, Dystopian fiction, Apocalyptic and post-apocalyptic fiction
- Publisher: Jonathan Cape
- Publication date: 16 October 1980
- Publication place: United Kingdom
- Media type: Print (Hardcover)
- Pages: 220
- Awards: John W. Campbell Memorial Award, Australian Science Fiction Achievement Award
- ISBN: 0-224-01851-5
- OCLC: 7313161
- Dewey Decimal: 813.54
- LC Class: PS3558.O336

Riddley Walker is a science fiction novel by American writer Russell Hoban, first published in 1980. It won the John W. Campbell Memorial Award for best science fiction novel in 1982, as well as an Australian Science Fiction Achievement Award in 1983. It was nominated for the Nebula Award for Best Novel in 1981.

It is Hoban's best-known adult novel and a drastic departure from his other work, although he continued to explore some of the same themes in other settings.

== Production ==
Hoban began work on the novel in 1974, inspired by the medieval wall painting of the legend of Saint Eustace at Canterbury Cathedral.

== Plot ==
Roughly two thousand years after a nuclear war has devastated civilization, Riddley, the young narrator, stumbles upon efforts to recreate a weapon of the ancient world.

The novel's characters live a harsh life in a small area which is presently the English county of Kent, and know little of the world outside of "Inland" (England). Their level of civilization is similar to England's prehistoric Iron Age, although they do not produce their own iron but salvage it from ancient machinery. Church and state have combined into one secretive institution, whose mythology, based on misinterpreted stories of the war and an old Catholic saint (Eustace), is enacted in puppet shows.

== Characters ==
- Riddley Walker, the 12-year-old protagonist
- Brooder Walker, Riddley's father who is known for his "connexions" (prophetic stories) and dies early in the story
- Lorna, the seer/priest in their village
- Abel Goodparley and Erny Orfing, agents of the political-religious government
- Eusa, a religious figure portrayed in puppet form
- Lissener, titled the Ardship of Cambry, one of the mutant "Eusa folk"

== Language ==
A notable feature of the book is its unique dialect: an imagined future version of the English language. This language blends puns, phonetic spelling, and colloquialisms, and is influenced by the dialects of East Kent as Hoban heard them before 1980, where the book is set. Professor of English John Mullan praised the novel's dialect as an "extraordinary risk" and noted that the language "naturalises the shattered world" of the novel, absorbing and engaging readers. Author Peter Schwenger called the language "quasi-illiterate, largely phonetic," arguing that it "slows us to the pace of an oral culture."

Some features include:

- Technological idioms: progam for plan, gallack seas for the heavens, Puter Leat for the computer elite, pirntowt for printout (or conclusion), the Littl Shyning Man the Addom for the atom
- Capitalized nouns: Plomercy for diplomacy, Trubba for trouble, Master Chaynjis for changes, or the apocalypse
- Phonetic spelling: fizzics for physics, vackt our wayt for evacuated, soar vivers for survivors
- Place names: Inland for England, Cambry for Canterbury, Do It Over for Dover, Fork Stoan for Folkestone
- Titles: Wes Mincer for Westminster, Pry Mincer for prime minister, Guvner for leader, Ardship of Cambry for Archbishop of Canterbury
- Colloquialisms: bye bye hump for burial mound, doing the juicy for sex, Bad Time for nuclear armageddon
- Kent dialect: parbly for probably, arnge for orange, barms for bombs

== Critical reception ==
From the cover of the Folio Society edition by Quentin Blake

Peter Ruppert noted that Hoban's novel draws on "such well-known dystopias as A Clockwork Orange, Lord of the Flies, and A Canticle for Leibowitz", and "what is unique in Hoban's haunting vision of the future is his language" which is described as being similar to the Nadsat slang spoken in Anthony Burgess' A Clockwork Orange. The Bulletin of the Atomic Scientists stated that, "The force and beauty and awfulness of Hoban's creation is shattering," and praised the author's use of a crude "Chaucerian English". John Mullan of The Guardian also praised Hoban's decision to narrate the novel in a devolved form of English: "The struggle with Riddley's language is what makes reading the book so absorbing, so completely possessing."

Library Journal wrote that the book holds "a unique and beloved place among the few after-Armageddon classics". It was included in David Pringle's book Science Fiction: The 100 Best Novels. In 1994, American literary critic Harold Bloom included Riddley Walker in his list of works comprising the Western Canon.

== Adaptations ==
=== Film and theatre ===
- Robert C. Cumbow wrote in Slant Magazine that the post-apocalyptic film Mad Max Beyond Thunderdome borrowed "whole ideas, themes and characterizations" from the novel.
- Hoban's own theatrical adaptation premiered at the Royal Exchange Theatre, Manchester, in February 1986. It was directed by Braham Murray and starred David Threlfall. Its U.S. premiere was at the Chocolate Bayou Theatre, in April 1987, directed by Greg Roach.
- In 1989, Russell Hoban gave permission for theatre students at Sir Percival Whitley/Calderdale College, Halifax, West Yorkshire, to transcribe the book into a theatrical script, which was then staged in a new production at The Square Chapel, Halifax.
- In November 2007, the play was produced by Red Kettle in Waterford, Ireland, to positive reviews.
- In 2011, the play was also adapted for Trouble Puppet Theater Co. by artistic director Connor Hopkins at Salvage Vanguard Theater in Austin, Texas. This production employed tabletop puppetry inspired by the Bunraku tradition and was supported by an original score by Justin Sherburn.

=== Popular music ===
- "The Rapture of Riddley Walker" is the eighth song on the Clutch album From Beale Street to Oblivion (2007).
- "Widder's Dump", named after a location in the book and notes on the credits as being inspired by the novel, is the fifth song on the 1989 King Swamp album.
- "In the Heart of the Wood and What I Found There" from the album Thunder Perfect Mind by Current 93 features references to Riddley Walker. Another Current 93 song, "The Blue Gates of Death" from the album Earth Covers Earth incorporates a rhyme from the book. Also, their album Of Ruine or Some Blazing Starre cites the Saint Eustace story.
- "Ode to Riddley Walker" is the title track of the second solo album by The Owl Service vocalist Diana Collier (2020). The song refers directly to Hoban's novel.

== See also ==
- Cloud Atlas
- The Book of Dave
- Engine Summer
- Pilgermann
- A Canticle for Leibowitz

== Sources ==
- Ackerley, Chris (2017). "Russell Hoban's Riddley Walker: The Eusa Story and Other Blipful Figgers". In Marshall, Simone Celine; Cusack, Carole M. (eds.). The Medieval Presence in the Modernist Aesthetic. Brill. pp. 169–190. doi:10.1163/9789004357020_012. ISBN 978-90-04-35702-0.
- Boyne, Martin (2009). "Sentenced to Destruction: a Stylistic Analysis of the Syntax of Two Post-apocalyptic Novels" (PDF). Working with English: Medieval and Modern Language, Literature and Drama. 5 (1): 1–20.
- Cockrell, Amanda (Spring 2004). "On This Enchanted Ground: Reflections of a Cold War Childhood in Russell Hoban's "Riddley Walker" and Walter M. Miller's "A Canticle for Leibowitz"". Journal of the Fantastic in the Arts. 15 (1): 20–36. JSTOR 43308682.
- Dowling, David (1988). "Russell Hoban's Riddley Walker: Doing the Connections". Critique: Studies in Contemporary Fiction. 29 (3): 179–187. doi:10.1080/00111619.1988.9937847.
- Eve, Martin Paul (2014). ""some kind of thing it aint us but yet its in us": David Mitchell, Russell Hoban, and Metafiction After the Millennium". SAGE Open. 4 (1): 1–10. doi:10.1177/2158244014521636.
- Granofsky, Ronald (1986). "Holocaust as Symbol in Riddley Walker and The White Hotel". Modern Language Studies. 16 (3): 172–182. doi:10.2307/3194897. JSTOR 3194897.
- Hannah, Matthew; Mayer, Sylvia (2021). "Scale and Speculative Futures in Russell Hoban's Riddley Walker and Kim Stanley Robinson's 2312". In Hanke, Christine; Milburn, Colin; Hutta, Jan Simon; Cortiel, Jeanne (eds.). Practices of Speculation. Modeling, Embodiment, Figuration. Transcript Verlag. pp. 191–208. ISBN 9783837647518.
- Huisman, David (1994). "'Hoap of a Tree' in Riddley Wa'ker". Christianity and Literature. 43 (3–2): 347–373. doi:10.1177/014833319404300309.
- Lake, David J. (1984). "Making the Two One: Language and Mysticism in "Riddley Walker"". Extrapolation. 25 (2): 157–170. doi:10.3828/extr.1984.25.2.157.
- Maclean, Marie (1988). "The Signifier as Token: The Textual Riddles of Russell Hoban". Journal of the Australasian Universities Language and Literature Association. 70 (1): 211–219. doi:10.1179/aulla.1988.001.
- Maynor, Natalie; Patteson, Richard F. (1984). "Language as Protagonist in Russell Hoban's Riddley Walker". Critique: Studies in Contemporary Fiction. 26 (1): 18–25. doi:10.1080/00111619.1984.9933791.
- Mullen, R. D. (November 2000). "Dialect, Grapholect, and Story: Russell Hoban's "Riddley Walker" as Science Fiction". Science Fiction Studies. 27 (3): 391–417. doi:10.1525/sfs.27.3.0391. JSTOR 4241511.
- Mustazza, Leonard (1989). "Myth and History in Russell Hoban's Riddley Walker". Critique: Studies in Contemporary Fiction. 31 (1): 17–26. doi:10.1080/00111619.1989.9934681.
- Porter, Jeffrey (Winter 1990). ""Three Quarks for Muster Mark": Quantum Wordplay and Nuclear Discourse in Russell Hoban's "Riddley Walker"". Contemporary Literature. 31 (4): 448–469. doi:10.2307/1208323. JSTOR 1208323.
- Roache, John (2017). "In the Moment of Danger: Benjaminian History and Theology in Russell Hoban's Riddley Walker". Symplokē. 25 (1–2): 355–374. doi:10.5250/symploke.25.1-2.0355. S2CID 148964555.
- Schwenger, P. (1991). "Circling Ground Zero". PMLA. 106 (2): 251–261. doi:10.2307/462661. JSTOR 462661. S2CID 163939306.
- Schwetman, John W. (1985). "Russell Hoban's Riddley Walker and the Language of the Future". Extrapolation. 26 (3): 212–219. doi:10.3828/extr.1985.26.3.212.
- Taylor, Nancy Dew (1989). "'…You Bes go Ballsy': Riddley Walker's Prescription for the Future". Critique: Studies in Contemporary Fiction. 31 (1): 27–39. doi:10.1080/00111619.1989.9934682.
- Warren, Martin L. (March 2007). "The St. Eustace Legend as Palimpsest in Hoban's "Riddley Walker"". Science Fiction Studies. 34 (1): 158–163. JSTOR 4241511.
