= Amaryllis Night and Day =

2001 novel by Russell Hoban

- First edition
- Author: Russell Hoban
- Cover artist: Will Webb/Jeff Cottenden
- Language: English
- Genre: Romance novel, speculative fiction
- Publisher: Bloomsbury
- Publication date: 2001
- Publication place: Great Britain
- Pages: 176
- ISBN: 0-7475-5285-1
- OCLC: 45306473

Amaryllis Night and Day is a 2001 novel by Russell Hoban, incorporating elements of magic realism and romance.

== Plot introduction ==
Peter Diggs has a vivid dream in which he meets a woman called Amaryllis. When he later encounters the same woman in real life, he discovers that the two of them have the ability to enter each other's dreams. A cautious relationship is begun, half in the real world and half in dreams, in which both parties struggle to overcome the emotional effects of previous failed romances.

== Characters ==
- Peter Diggs, the narrator of the novel, an artist in his early thirties
- Amaryllis, who has the power to ‘tune in’ to people's dreams
- Lenore, Peter's former girlfriend, an artist with emotional problems
- Ron Hastings, a student of Peter's who appears in his dreams and who may also know Amaryllis

== Allusions/references to other works ==
Many other writers and musicians are mentioned or quoted in the novel, including:

- Nelson Algren's A Walk on the Wild Side
- The Tom Waits song Walking Spanish
- Edward Hopper's painting Gas (which the characters enter during a dream)
- The Sleeping Beauty fairytale
- Brer Rabbit
- The Negro spiritual There is a Balm in Gilead
- Milton's Lycidas (which includes the line ‘to sport with Amaryllis in the shade’)
- The film Dreamscape
- The prisons etchings of Piranesi
- Thornton Wilder's The Bridge of San Luis Rey
- Georg Christoph Lichtenberg
- The self-help ‘life coach’ Anthony Robbins
- Barbara Strozzi
- The 1930s song "Life Is Just a Bowl of Cherries"
- Oliver Onions's story "The Beckoning Fair One"
- Walter de la Mare's poem ‘Fare Well’
- Melville's Moby-Dick

== Adaptations ==
According to fansites, the book has been optioned by Doppelganger Films.

== Release details ==
- 2001, UK, Bloomsbury ISBN 0-7475-5285-1, trade paperback
