= Emmet Otter's Jug-Band Christmas =

1977 Christmas television special

- 2008 DVD cover
- Genre: Family film; Television special
- Based on: Emmet Otter's Jug-Band Christmas by Russell Hoban and Lillian Hoban Kermit the Frog by Jim Henson
- Written by: Jerry Juhl
- Directed by: Jim Henson
- Starring: Jerry Nelson; Frank Oz; Marilyn Sokol; Dave Goelz; Richard Hunt; Eren Ozker; Jim Henson
- Narrated by: Jim Henson as Kermit the Frog
- Theme music composer: Paul Williams
- Country of origin: United States
- Original language: English

Production
- Producer: Jim Henson
- Editor: Geoff Craigen (videotape editor)
- Running time: 48 min.
- Production company: Henson Associates

Original release
- Network: CBC (Canada); HBO (US)
- Release: December 4, 1977

Emmet Otter's Jug-Band Christmas is a 1977 television special directed by Jim Henson, based on the 1971 children's book of the same name by Russell Hoban, itself inspired by "The Gift of the Magi" by O. Henry. The special features characters from Hoban's novel, in a teleplay adapted by Jerry Juhl, beginning with an introduction by Kermit the Frog, who tells the story of Emmet Otter and his widowed Ma, a poor family of otters who struggle to get Christmas presents for the other as a result of their financial situation. The special was produced by The Jim Henson Company and first premiered on CBC Television on December 4, 1977.

The special received positive reviews from critics and audiences, and would later be syndicated in the years that followed with airings on HBO in 1978 and ABC in 1980. In 2019, it was announced that a film remake of Emmet Otter's Jug-Band Christmas was in the works to be directed by Bret McKenzie.

== Production ==
In 1977, Muppets creator Jim Henson produced a one-hour television adaptation of the story video taped in Toronto. The special first premiered on CBC on December 4, 1977, with a U.S. premiere the following year on the fledgling HBO on December 17, 1978. The special later aired on ABC and Nickelodeon in the 1990s. The special features several original songs written by songwriter Paul Williams.

The special utilizes a number of different puppetry methods. The main puppets used are the usual Muppet hand puppets, but the characters are frequently represented by marionettes as well. It also utilizes the bunraku and Black Theater techniques. This is also one of the first Muppet productions to use radio control puppet effects, designed by Faz Fazakas.

Emmet Otter's Jug-Band Christmas also featured extensively platformed-up sets, all created with great attention to detail. Jim Henson explained:

Emmet Otter was the first time we had gotten into those kind of elaborate sets where we had floors in the interiors and we would take a wide-angle shot with characters coming up through holes in the floor. Or we'd cut into the set and remove the floor and have the characters moving through space in waist shots. That was the most elaborate production we had gotten into at that point. Frog Prince had been platformed-up and The Muppet Show was always platformed-up, but in Emmet Otter... we'd go right into a scene. We'd have the whole set in three dimensions... rigged so we could pop parts and come out through the openings, which is really time consuming...

The original special featured an introduction by Kermit the Frog, who also narrated certain scenes (in the 1978 release), and made an appearance near the end delivering closing remarks. The Jim Henson Company sold the rights to the Muppets (including Kermit) to The Walt Disney Company in 2004 (namely their branch in The Muppets Studio), and Kermit's scenes and narrations were thus omitted from the special's 2005 DVD.

The special's 2018 Blu-ray and DVD releases reinstate Kermit's scenes, but not his narrations.

== Plot ==
Kermit the Frog is introducing the story of Emmet Otter when he is interrupted by the Riverbottom Gang, a group of hoodlums (made up of Chuck Stoat, Fred Lizard, Howard Snake, "Pop-Eyed" Catfish, and Stanley Weasel), who insult him and steal his scarf. The scene then shifts to a river featuring Emmet and his widowed Ma, who scrape by on the small amount of money Ma gets from doing laundry and Emmet gets from doing odd jobs around their community in Frogtown Hollow. Emmet and Ma are kind to their neighbors, despite often being cheated out of what they deserve for the work they do. While window shopping in nearby Waterville, Ma and Emmet wistfully reflect on Pa's life, and his unsuccessful snake oil venture. As Christmas approaches, they each hear of a talent contest with a grand prize of $50, and separately decide to enter, so they can afford to surprise the other with a present: Ma, a fine guitar for Emmet, and Emmet, a piano for Ma. However, they must sacrifice each other's livelihood to be able to perform. Ma hocks Emmet's tools for dress fabric while Emmet turns Ma's washtub into a washtub bass for a jug band, each convincing themselves it is what Pa would have done. Emmet assembles Wendell Porcupine, Harvey Beaver, and Charlie Muskrat as the Frogtown Hollow Jubilee Jug Band.

Emmet and Ma each perform well (despite Emmet's band having to frantically change songs after another contestant performs their song), only to be defeated by the last-minute entry of the Riverbottom Gang as a rock and roll band called The Nightmare. However, as Ma and Emmet's band walk home together, disappointed, Ma realizes their two songs could fit together, and as they sing, they are overheard by Doc Bullfrog, one of the talent show judges, who hires them to play regularly in his restaurant. Emmet and Ma decide they will be happier performing together than with the thankless work they had been doing before, and Kermit concludes the special with Emmet, Ma, and the gang playing in front of Doc and his customers.

== Muppet performers ==
- Jerry Nelson as Emmet Otter, Doc Bullfrog, Melissa Rabbit, Stanley Weasel and Yancey Woodchuck
- Frank Oz as Chuck Stoat and Alice Otter (puppeteer)
  - Marilyn Sokol as Alice Otter (voice)
- Dave Goelz as "Pop-Eyed" Catfish, Wendell Porcupine and Will Possum
- Richard Hunt as Charlie Muskrat, Fred Lizard and George Rabbit
- Eren Ozker as Gretchen Fox, Hetty Muskrat, Mrs. Mink and Old Lady Possum
- Jim Henson as Kermit the Frog, Harvey Beaver, Howard Snake and Mayor Harrison Fox (uncredited)

== Songs ==
The special features several original songs penned by songwriter Paul Williams. Williams had previously worked with the Muppets on The Muppet Show and collaborated with the Muppets by writing the songs for The Muppet Movie and The Muppet Christmas Carol. The song "Brothers in Our World" was later covered by My Morning Jacket for the Muppets cover album Muppets: The Green Album.

List of songs
- "The Bathing Suit That Grandma Otter Wore"
- "There Ain't No Hole in the Washtub"
- "When the River Meets the Sea"
- "Bar-B-Que"
- "Our World"
- "Brothers"
- "Riverbottom Nightmare Band"
- "Brothers in Our World"

On November 2, 2018, Varese Sarabande Records released the soundtrack on CD and LP.

1. "The Bathing Suit That Grandma Wore" – 2:43
2. "Jam Session – 1:07
3. "Ain't No Hole in the Washtub – 2:11
4. "When the River Meets the Sea – 2:30
5. "Bar-B-Que (Jug Band) – 1:39
6. "Carrots the Dancing Horse – 0:51
7. "Bar-B-Que (Yancy Woodchuck) – 0:36
8. "Dancing Rabbit Act – 0:44
9. "Squirrel Acrobatic Act – 0:39
10. "Our World – 1:51
11. "Brothers – 2:03
12. "Riverbottom Nightmare Band – 2:42
13. "Our World-Brothers – 2:13
14. "Our World-Brothers Club Reprise – 0:50
15. "When the River Meets the Sea Reprise – 2:32
16. "Born in a Trunk – 1:09 (Bonus Track)

== Releases ==
The special was released on CED videodisc in 1981, alongside "The Muppet Musicians of Bremen" as part of the "Tales from Muppetland" videodisc.

In 2005, HIT Entertainment released a "Collector's Edition" DVD which featured several deleted or alternate scenes, as well as a "lost" song that was recorded, but never actually used in the special. Called "I Was Born in the Trunk", the song was written for the talent show scene and was performed by the Waterville music store owner. Due to the sale of the Muppets to Disney a year earlier, Kermit's scenes and narrations were omitted from this release.

On Saturday, December 12, 2015, a remastered version of the special's 1980 release had its cable channel debut alongside remastered The Bells of Fraggle Rock on ABC Family during its 25 Days of Christmas programming block. A 40th Anniversary DVD of the special was released by Sony Pictures Home Entertainment on October 10, 2017, followed by a Blu-ray release on December 18, 2018. For the 2015 airing, as well as the subsequent DVD and Blu-ray releases, Kermit's introduction and closing scenes were restored.

In 2017, to commemorate the 40th anniversary of the special, musician Matt Surowiec produced an officially licensed "tribute" album featuring all-new covers of Paul Williams' original songs from the special.

In 2022, the special, with Kermit's introduction and ending but not his other narrations, was made available for streaming on Peacock.

In 2025, Shout! Studios made the special available for free on YouTube.

== Reception ==
Emmet Otter's Jug-Band Christmas received very positive reviews from critics. John J. O'Connor gave the special a very positive review in The New York Times on December 15, 1980, for its ABC airing: "Jim Henson and the Muppets are on a dazzling winning streak these days... Mr. Henson has produced and directed one of the most charming Christmas specials of the last several years... Once again, Mr. Henson's creations verge on the marvelous, perfectly capturing the Wind in the Willows aspects of Emmet Otter's story... These really are the nicest folk on the river – and on prime-time television." Review aggregator Rotten Tomatoes gave the film a score of 100% based on 8 reviews, with an average score of 8.4/10.

=== Awards ===
Emmet Otter's Jug Band Christmas was nominated for four Emmy Awards in 1981:

- Outstanding Children's Program, David Lazer (executive producer) and Jim Henson (producer)
- Outstanding Individual Achievement – Children's Programming, Calista Hendrickson (costume designer) and Sherry Ammott (costume designer)
- Outstanding Individual Achievement – Children's Programming, Paul Williams (composer/lyricist) for the song "When The River Meets the Sea".
- Outstanding Individual Achievement – Children's Programming, Tom Wright (lighting)

== In popular culture ==
In Walt Disney's 2016 film Zootopia, Officer Hopps was tasked with finding a missing mammal from Chief Bogo's priority case file, one Emmet Otterton.

The Hallmark Channel's 2025 film The More the Merrier sees an ER doctor taking charge of a new hire on December 24. Trying to get to know him, she asks his favorite holiday film, which he laughingly admits is Emmet Otter.

In the Robot Chicken Christmas episode "Born Again Virgin Christmas Special", a sketch involves Emmet inviting Frankie Fox as the newest member of the Frogtown Hollow Jubilee Jug Band. However, the rest of the band are wary, as foxes are their natural enemies. Sure enough, Frankie attacks them all during their performance of "We're All the Same on Christmas Day".

== Later appearances ==
- Emmet Otter, Alice Otter, Mayor Harrison Fox, Gretchen Fox, Doc Bullfrog, Yancy Woodchuck, Will Possum, Fred Lizard, Stanley Weasel, Chuck Stoat, Howard Snake, Charlie Muskrat, Harvey Beaver, and Wendell Porcupine, George and Melissa Rabbit, two squirrels, and Old Lady Possum made cameos in The Muppet Movie. They are seen in the "Rainbow Connection" finale.
- Some of the puppets made cameos in The Muppet Show:
  - Mayor Harrison Fox's puppet was reused in several episodes that included the Woodland Animals including the "Bob Hope" episode (where he was in the "For What It's Worth" number with unclothed versions of Old Lady Possum, James Badger, Will Possum, George Rabbit, and Nat Muskrat alongside a deer, a mouse, a toothless beaver, and a weasel), the "Kris Kristofferson and Rita Coolidge" episode (where he alongside James Badger, Nat Muskrat, and Will Possum were repurposed for the "We're All Alone" song that also featured Billy the Bear, a Deer, a Beaver, and a Weasel), and the "Leo Sayer" episode (where he was featured in the "When I Need You" number with Billy the Bear, Mickey Moose, Harold Woodpecker, a beaver, a weasel, James Badger, and Crazy Harry).
  - Fred Lizard was seen in the "Shields & Yarnell" and the "Dyan Cannon" episode.
- Emmet Otter, Alice Otter, Mayor Harrison Fox, Gretchen Fox, and Wendell Porcupine appeared in The Muppets: A Celebration of 30 Years.
- Doc Bullfrog, Yancy Woodchuck, Old Lady Possum, George and Melissa Rabbit, and two squirrels appeared in the "Jim Henson's Musical World" concert at Carnegie Hall.
- In the eighth episode of The Muppets Mayhem, Floyd Pepper exclaims: "Yeah, we don't beef with nobody. Well, except that one band from Riverbottom", with Dr. Teeth adding, "Yeah, they were a nightmare", referring to the Riverbottom Gang and their band, Riverbottom Nightmare Band.

=== Film adaptation ===
On October 21, 2019, it was announced that Bret McKenzie is writing the script and songs for a film adaptation of the TV special, which will be produced by The Jim Henson Company, Pacific Electric Picture Company, and Snoot Entertainment.

=== Stage adaptation ===
In December 2008, a musical stage adaptation of the TV special titled Jim Henson's Emmet Otter's Jug-Band Christmas premiered at the Goodspeed Opera House in East Haddam, Connecticut. Because it was developed in collaboration with Goodspeed Musicals and The Jim Henson Company, the adaptation was able to use some of the original figures from the special. Timothy Allen McDonald and Christopher Gattelli co-adapted the production, with Gattelli also serving as director and choreographer. The musical was scored by Paul Williams, incorporating his songs from the special alongside several new songs written specifically for the stage iteration. The Goodspeed Opera House's 2009-2010 season featured a reprise of the production under the shortened title Jim Henson’s Emmet Otter.

For it's Off-Broadway debut at the New Victory Theatre in December 2021, the adaptation reverted to its original title. It featured rebuilt figures because the originals were placed in museums following the Goodspeed productions. Multiple positive cases of COVID-19 among the cast forced the show to close on December 29, 2021, several days prior to its scheduled closing performance on January 2, 2022. In an Instagram post published on the day of the closure, McDonald stated that the musical would return to the New Victory Theatre in 2022, though it never materialized.

Several regional productions have been staged since the Off-Broadway run closed, including runs at the Studebaker Theater in Chicago, Illinois, in 2023 and the OFC Creations Theatre Center in Rochester, New York, in late 2025, with OFC set to reprise the show in November 2026. Jordan Brownlee, who originated the role of Doc Bullfrog Off-Broadway, reprised the part in the Chicago production and both Rochester engagements.

== See also ==
- List of Christmas films
