= Basquiat: A Quick Killing in Art =

1998 biography by Phoebe Hoban

- Author: Phoebe Hoban
- Genre: Biography
- Published: August 1, 1998
- Publisher: Viking
- Pages: 400
- ISBN: 0-670-85477-8

Basquiat: A Quick Killing in Art is a book by journalist Phoebe Hoban, chronicling the life of American artist Jean-Michel Basquiat. Released in 1998 by Viking, the unauthorized biography was not endorsed by Basquiat's estate, but various people who were close to Basquiat contributed their recollections of him.

== Synopsis ==
Jean-Michel Basquiat was born in Brooklyn, New York to a multicultural middle-class family on December 22, 1960. Under the alias SAMO, he painted poetic verses on the walls of lower Manhattan in the late 1970s. Within five years, Basquiat went from a teenage graffiti artist to an international art star renowned for his neo-expressionism paintings. Basquiat's brief career spanned the 1980s art boom and epitomized its outrageous excess. Already considered a legend in his own lifetime, Basquiat was a fixture of the downtown scene. Along the way, he got involved with many of the most celebrated personalities, from his friendships with pop artists Keith Haring and Andy Warhol to his romance with singer Madonna. Regarded as the "Jimi Hendrix of the art," Basquiat died of a drug overdose at age twenty-seven on August 12, 1988.

== Critical reception ==
Basquiat: A Quick Killing in Art received mixed reviews.

Publishers Weekly wrote: "Hoban makes a strong case that racism marred the life of the dreadlocked artist in paint-spattered Armani suits. What's missing is any analysis of the degree to which Basquiat's enormous drug consumption (ca. 100 bags of heroin a day at the end) contributed to his imagery."

Patricia Bosworth wrote for The New York Times that "the book remains compulsively readable. There is enormous value in it, especially in Hoban's depiction of the glitzy 1980's art world."

Michelle V. McEwen wrote for The Harvard Crimson: "While Hoban recognizes the racism evident in a few specific encounters, she never gives any sort of profound analysis of the racism that structured Basquiat's most significant relationships, both business and personal."

== Re-release ==
Basquiat: A Quick Killing in Art was reissued by Open Road Media with a new foreword in 2016.

== See also ==
- Basquiat
- Jean-Michel Basquiat: The Radiant Child
- Basquiat: Rage to Riches
