= The Lion of Boaz-Jachin and Jachin-Boaz =

The Lion of Boaz-Jachin and Jachin-Boaz is a novel by American writer Russell Hoban published in 1973, and was his first book for adult readers. The novel is set in an unspecified location in the Middle East, and was written when Hoban lived in London, and was initially published by British publisher Jonathan Cape . Initially appearing to be written as a kind of fable, Boaz-Jachin and Jachin-Boaz are a father and son, both map-makers; the narrative then places both father and son in contemporary London.
