= Johanna Hurwitz =

American children's writer

Johanna Hurwitz (born October 9, 1937) is an American author of more than sixty children's books. She has sold millions of books in many different languages.

== Life and career ==
Hurwitz graduated from Queens College, New York with a degree in English and from the Columbia University School of Library Service with a master's in library science.

After many years working as a librarian, Hurwitz wrote her first book, Busybody Nora, in 1976, one of the first in the chapter book genre for transitioning young readers from shorter stories to novels. Busybody Nora took 17 tries for publishing companies to publish the book. Ravenstone Press published the book three months after Hurwitz submitted the story.

Hurwitz's books include biographies for children on subjects such as Anne Frank, Astrid Lindgren, Leonard Bernstein, and Helen Keller. Her 1999 book, The Just Desserts Club, combined related short stories with recipes.

Hurwitz is the aunt of Garance Franke-Ruta and Ted Frank.

== Selected works ==
=== Fiction ===
- Busybody Nora. William Morrow. 1976.
- Baseball Fever. Illustrated by Ray Cruz. William Morrow. 1981.
- Class President. Illustrated by Sheila Hamanaka. William Morrow. 1990.
- New Shoes for Silvia. Illustrated by Jerry Pinkney. William Morrow. 1993.
