= Russell Hoban =

American writer (1925–2011)

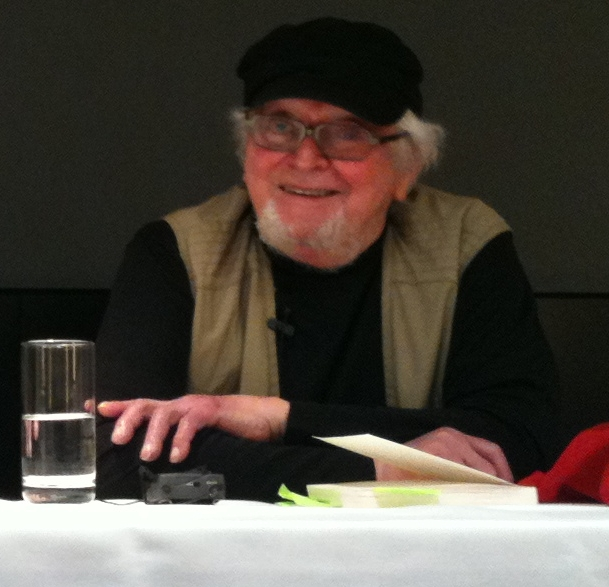
- Hoban in London, November 2010
- Born: Russell Conwell Hoban; February 4, 1925; Lansdale, Pennsylvania, US
- Died: December 13, 2011 (aged 86); London, England
- Occupations: Writer, illustrator
- Spouses: Lillian Aberman (m. 1944; div. 1975); Gundula Ahl (m. 1975)
- Children: 7, including Phoebe
- Writing career
- Notable awards: Whitbread Prize; 1974; Campbell Memorial Award; 1982

Russell Conwell Hoban (February 4, 1925 – December 13, 2011) was an American writer. His works span many genres, including fantasy, science fiction, mainstream fiction, magical realism, poetry, and children's books. He lived in London from 1969 until his death.

== Biography ==
Hoban was born in Lansdale, Pennsylvania, just outside Philadelphia, to Jewish immigrants from Ostrog (now in Ukraine). His father, Abram T. Hoban, was the advertising manager of the Yiddish-language Jewish Daily Forward and the director of The Drama Guild of the Labor Institute of the Workmen's Circle of Philadelphia. His father died when Russell was 11, and Russell was thereafter raised by his mother, Jeanette Dimmerman. He was named for Russell Conwell. After briefly attending Temple University, he enlisted in the Army at age 18 and served in the Philippines and Italy as a radio operator during World War II, earning a bronze star. During his military service he married Lillian Aberman, who later became a writer and illustrator herself. They had four children before divorcing in 1975.

After leaving military service, Hoban worked as an illustrator, painting several covers for TIME, Sports Illustrated, and The Saturday Evening Post, and as an advertising copywriter—occupations that several of his characters later shared—before he wrote and illustrated his first children's book, What Does It Do and How Does It Work?: Power Shovel, Dump Truck, and Other Heavy Machines, published by Harper in 1959. His 1962 Time cover portrait of Joan Baez now hangs in the US National Portrait Gallery.

The note "About the Artist" in the Macmillan Classics Edition of Tales and Poems of Edgar Allan Poe (second printing 1965), which Hoban illustrated, notes that he worked in advertising for Batten Barton Durstine & Osborn and that he later became the art director of J. Walter Thompson: "Heavy machinery later became subjects for his paintings, and this led him into the children's book field with the writing and illustrating of What Does It Do and How Does It Work? and The Atomic Submarine." That note also points out that in 1964, at the time the book's illustrations were copyrighted, Hoban was teaching drawing at the School of Visual Arts in New York City, collaborating with his first wife on their fifth children's book, and living in Connecticut.

Hoban wrote exclusively for children for the next decade, and came to be known best for the series of seven picture books that feature Frances, a temperamental badger girl whose escapades were based partly on the experiences of his four children, Phoebe, Brom, and Julia and their friends.

Frances did not eat her egg.
She sang a little song to it.
She sang the song very softly:

"I do not like the way you slide,
I do not like your soft inside,
I do not like you lots of ways,
And I could do for many days
Without eggs."

Garth Williams depicted Frances as a badger in the first book, Bedtime for Frances (Harper, 1960), and Lillian Hoban retained that image as the illustrator of five sequels and a poetry collection, published from 1964 to 1972.

The U.S. national library reports holding about three dozen books written by Hoban and published from 1959 to 1972, including about two dozen illustrated by Lillian Hoban. One was illustrated by their son Brom Hoban: The Sea-thing Child (1972).

A dark philosophical tale for older children, The Mouse and His Child, appeared in 1967 and was Hoban's first full-length novel. It was later made into an animated film in 1977 by Murakami-Wolf-Swenson.

In 1969, the Hobans and their children travelled to London, intending to stay only a short time. The marriage dissolved and, while the rest of the family returned to the United States, Hoban remained in London for the rest of his life. All of Hoban's adult novels except for Riddley Walker, Pilgermann, Angelica Lost and Found (October 2010) and Fremder are set either wholly or partly in contemporary London.

In 1971, Hoban wrote a book employing concepts borrowed from "The Gift of the Magi", called Emmet Otter's Jug-Band Christmas, which further reached fans through a 1977 television special originally created for HBO by the Jim Henson Company. The book was illustrated by Lillian Hoban, whose drawn renditions of these characters were faithfully replicated by the Muppet creators. The story tells of a poor otter mother and son who do what they must to try to provide a special Christmas to one another, taking a route neither of them expected. His novel Turtle Diary (1975) was turned into a film version released in 1985, with a screenplay by Harold Pinter.

== Family ==
Hoban had four children with his first wife, Lillian Aberman Hoban. Their daughter Phoebe Hoban is a journalist and biographer who specializes in art. The couple divorced in 1975, and in the same year he married Gundula Ahl, who worked in the fashionable London bookshop Truslove and Hanson. With Ahl he had three children, one of whom is the composer Wieland Hoban, to whom Riddley Walker is dedicated. Wieland Hoban set one of his father's texts to music in his piece Night Roads (1998–99).

Hoban's sister, Tana Hoban (1917–2006), was a photographer and children's author; he also had another sister, Freeda Hoban Ellis (1919–2002).

== Later life ==
The last of Hoban's novels published during his lifetime was Angelica Lost and Found (October 2010), in which the hippogriff from Girolamo da Carpi's Ruggiero Saving Angelica breaks free from the 16th-century painting to search for Angelica in 21st-century San Francisco.

Hoban died on December 13, 2011. He had once ruefully observed that death would be a good career move: "People will say, 'Yes, Hoban, he seems an interesting writer, let's look at him again'."

Two new Hoban books were published posthumously by Walker Books in 2012: Soonchild, illustrated by Alexis Deacon, and Rosie's Magic Horse, illustrated by Quentin Blake. Deacon also provided artwork for a new version of Jim's Lion, published in 2014, which changed the format from a traditional picture book to a combination of text chapters and comics.

After his death, Hoban's papers were archived by writer Paul Cooper, and in 2016 the archive was acquired by the Beinecke Library at Yale University.

== Fan and community activity ==
In May 1998, Dave Awl, a writer/performer with the experimental Chicago theatre troupe the Neo-Futurists, launched the first comprehensive Russell Hoban reference website, The Head of Orpheus, to which Russell Hoban regularly contributed news and information up until his death. In the fall of 1999, Awl founded a Hoban-themed online community called The Kraken (named after one of the characters in Hoban's 1987 novel The Medusa Frequency), which grew into an international network of Russell Hoban fans.

In 2002 an annual fan activity dubbed the Slickman A4 Quotation Event (SA4QE) (named after its founder, Diana Slickman, also a member of the Neo-Futurists) began, in which Hoban enthusiasts celebrate his birthday by writing down favourite quotes from his books (invariably on sheets of yellow A4 paper, a recurring Hoban motif) and leaving them in public places. By 2004, the event had occurred three times; as of February 2011 it has since taken place each year, seeing over 350 quotes distributed around 46 towns and cities throughout 14 countries.

In 2005 fans from across the world celebrated Hoban's work in London at the first international convention for the author, The Russell Hoban Some-Poasyum (a pun on symposium from Riddley Walker). A booklet was published by the organisers to commemorate the event featuring tributes to Hoban from a variety of contributors including actor and politician Glenda Jackson, novelist David Mitchell, composer Harrison Birtwistle and screenwriter Andrew Davies.

In 2012 a new "official" Russell Hoban website, www.russellhoban.org, was built and launched by volunteers from the community, with the approval of the author's family.

== Stage adaptations ==
In 1984, Hoban collaborated with the Impact Theatre Co-operative on a performance titled The Carrier Frequency. Hoban supplied the text for the piece, which was staged and performed by Impact. In 1999, The Carrier Frequency was restaged by the theater company Stan's Cafe.

In February 1986, a theatrical version of Hoban's novel Riddley Walker (adapted by Hoban himself) premiered at the Royal Exchange Theatre, Manchester. Its US premiere was at the Chocolate Bayou Theatre, in April 1987, directed by Greg Roach.

In November 2007, Hoban's adaptation of Riddley Walker was produced (for the third time) by the Red Kettle Theatre Company, in Waterford, Ireland, and was reviewed favorably in the Irish Times.

In March 1989 a stage adaptation of Kleinzeit was presented by the Tower Theatre Company, directed by Peta Barker, who had adapted the novel. One performance was seen by Russell Hoban who wrote a critique of the play, written on yellow paper, which is a major theme of the novel.

In 2011, the Trouble Puppet Theater Company produced an adaptation of Riddley Walker, with permission from and the aid of Russell Hoban. Artistic Director Connor Hopkins created the puppet theater play, with performances September 29 through October 16, 2011, at Salvage Vanguard Theater in Austin, Texas, U.S. The production employed tabletop puppetry inspired by the Bunraku tradition and enjoyed popular and critical success.

In 2012, the Royal Shakespeare Company announced that it would be premiering a new staging of Hoban's novel The Mouse and His Child as part of its winter 2012–13 season.

== Themes ==
Hoban is often described as a fantasy writer, and only two of his novels, Turtle Diary and The Bat Tattoo, are entirely devoid of supernatural elements. However, the fantasy elements are usually presented as only moderately surprising developments in an otherwise realistic contemporary story, which is magic realism. Exceptions include Kleinzeit, a comic fantasy whose characters include Death, Hospital, and Underground; Riddley Walker, a science-fiction novel whose futuristic setting is primitive and post-apocalyptic; Pilgermann, a historical novel about the Crusades; and Fremder, a more conventional science-fiction novel.

There is frequent repetition of images and themes in different contexts. For instance, many of Hoban's works refer to lions, Orpheus, Eurydice, Persephone, Vermeer, severed heads, heart disease, flickering, Odilon Redon, and King Kong.

== Awards ==
How Tom Beat Captain Najork and His Hired Sportsmen (1974), a picture book written by Hoban, illustrated by Quentin Blake, and published by Jonathan Cape, shared the annual Whitbread Award for Children's Books.

Riddley Walker, a novel published by Cape in 1980, won the 1982 John W. Campbell Memorial Award for Best Science Fiction Novel, juried recognition of the year's best SF novel published in English, and the "Best International Novel" prize at the 1983 Australian SF Convention (Ditmar Award). Pilgermann was one finalist a year later when no best international novel was named.

== Works ==
=== Novels for adults ===
- The Lion of Boaz-Jachin and Jachin-Boaz (1973), ISBN 0-8128-1624-2
- Kleinzeit (1974), ISBN 0-670-41458-1
- Turtle Diary (1975), ISBN 0-394-40199-9
- Riddley Walker (1980), ISBN 0-671-42147-6
- Pilgermann (1983), ISBN 0-671-45968-6
- The Medusa Frequency (1987), ISBN 0-87113-165-X
- Fremder (1996), ISBN 0-224-04370-6
- Mr. Rinyo-Clacton's Offer (1998), ISBN 0-224-05121-0
- Angelica's Grotto (1999), ISBN 0-7475-4611-8
- Amaryllis Night and Day (2001), ISBN 0-7475-5285-1
- The Bat Tattoo (2002), ISBN 0-7475-6022-6
- Her Name Was Lola (2003), ISBN 0-7475-7024-8
- Come Dance with Me (2005), ISBN 0-7475-7452-9
- Linger Awhile (2006), ISBN 0-7475-7984-9
- My Tango with Barbara Strozzi (2007), ISBN 0-7475-9271-3
- Angelica Lost and Found (2010), ISBN 978-1-4088-0660-9

=== Selected books for children and young adults ===
- "Frances the Badger" series (1960–70), the first book illustrated by Garth Williams, the rest illustrated by Lillian Hoban:
  - Bedtime for Frances (1960)
  - Bread and Jam for Frances (1964)
  - A Baby Sister for Frances (1964)
  - A Birthday for Frances (1968)
  - Best Friends for Frances (1969)
  - A Bargain for Frances (1970)
- Herman the Loser (1961), ill. Lillian Hoban
- The Sorely Trying Day (1964), ill. Lillian Hoban
- Charlie the Tramp (1966), ill. Lillian Hoban
- The Little Brute Family (1966), ill. Lillian Hoban
- Nothing To Do (1966), ill. Lillian Hoban
- The Mouse and His Child (1967, republished 1990), ISBN 0-06-022378-2 (also a 1977 film)
- The Stone Doll of Sister Brute (1968), ill. Lillian Hoban
- Harvey's Hideout (1969), ill. Lillian Hoban
- Emmet Otter's Jug-Band Christmas (1971, republished 1992), ill. Lillian Hoban, ISBN 0-89966-951-4 (also a 1977 TV special)
- The Sea-thing Child (Harper & Row, 1972, ISBN 0060223987), picture book illustrated by Abrom Hoban; reissued 1999 by Candlewick Press, ill. Patrick Benson
- Egg Thoughts and Other Frances Songs (1972), ISBN 0-06-022331-6 (ill. Lillian Hoban, poetry)
- How Tom Beat Captain Najork and his Hired Sportsmen (1974), ISBN 0-224-00999-0
- A Near Thing for Captain Najork (1975), ISBN 0-224-01197-9
- The Twenty Elephant Restaurant (1978), ill. Emily Arnold McCully
- La Corona and the Tin Frog (1979), ill. Nicola Bayley, ISBN 0-224-01397-1
- Dinner at Alberta's (1979), ill. James Marshall
- The Dancing Tigers (1979), ill. David Gentleman, ISBN 0-224-01374-2
- Flat Cat (1980), ill. Clive Scruton
- Ace Dragon Ltd. (1980), ill. Quentin Blake
- Arthur's New Power (1980), ill. Bryon Barton
- Serpent Tower (1981), ill. David Scott
- The Mole Family's Christmas (1969), ill. Lillian Hoban
- The Great Fruit Gum Robbery (1981), ill. Colin McNaughton
- They Came from Aargh! (1981), ill. Colin McNaughton
- The Flight of Bembel Rudzuk (1982), ill. Colin McNaughton
- The Battle of Zormla (1982), ill. Colin McNaughton
- Jim Frog (1983), ill. Martin Baynton
- Big John Turkle (1983), ill. Martin Baynton
- Lavinia Bat (1984), ill. Martin Baynton
- Charlie Meadows (1984), ill. Martin Baynton
- The Marzipan Pig (1986), ISBN 0-224-01687-3
- Rain Door (1987),
- Monsters (1989), ill. Quentin Blake
- Jim Hedgehog and the Lonesome Tower (1990), ill. John Rogan
- Jim Hedgehog's Supernatural Christmas (1994)
- The Trokeville Way (1996), ISBN 0-224-04631-4
- The Last of the Wallendas (1997), ISBN 0-340-66766-4 (poetry)
- Jim's Lion (2001), ill. Ian Andrew
- Soonchild (2012), ISBN 9781406329919
- Rosie's Magic Horse (2013), ill. Quentin Blake
- Trouble on Thunder Mountain, ill. Quentin Blake

=== Other works ===
- The Carrier Frequency (1984), stage play
- Deadsy and the Sexo-Chanjo (1989) and Door (1990), under the heading "Deadtime Stories for Big Folk", text and narration for animated films by David Anderson
- The Second Mrs Kong (1994), libretto for opera composed by Harrison Birtwistle
- The Moment Under the Moment (1992), stories, a libretto, essays and sketches

=== Film ===
- Turtle Diary (1985)
