= Busybody Nora =

1976 book by Johanna Hurwitz

- First edition
- Author: Johanna Hurwitz
- Illustrator: Susan Jeschke
- Language: English
- Genre: Chapter; Realistic fiction
- Publisher: William Morrow & Co.
- Publication date: 1976
- Publication place: United States
- Media type: Print (Hardcover)
- Pages: 64 pp
- ISBN: 0-688-22057-6

Busybody Nora is a children's book written by Johanna Hurwitz and illustrated by Susan Jeschke. It was first published in 1976.

It was Hurwitz's first book and was an early chapter book. Her daughter Naomi was the inspiration for Nora, and her son Ben was the inspiration for Teddy.

On Accelerated Reader, the level of the story is 4.1 (blue color), has a lexile measure of 630L and is recommended for seven- to ten-year-olds. It has since become a popular children's library book and is also used for school lessons.

The book is made up of six stories about a six-year-old girl called Nora, her young brother Teddy, and her parents who live in a New York apartment block.

== Plot ==
The protagonist, Nora, is a girl who lives in an apartment building of about 200 people in New York with her little brother Teddy and her parents. Although she has lived there all her life, she doesn't know all the residents' names so she asks everyone she meets what their name is and receives the moniker of 'Busybody'. One time, Nora accidentally becomes a babysitter for a day and later she and Teddy prepare for their dad's birthday. Another day, her grandparents visit and her grandfather talks about how he knew Jack from the beanstalk tale. Finally, Nora arranges for a building party as a way to persuade one of the resident's daughters, who lives in Ohio, that New York is a safe and friendly place for her mother to live.

== Reception ==
Publishers Weekly states that Busybody Nora is 'Six joyous stories ... will make six-year-old Nora and her little brother the favorite fiction friends of all readers, any age.'
