= Beat Bop =

Single by Rammellzee and K-Rob
- B-side: "Beat Bop (Instrumental)"
- Released: 1983
- Genre: Old-school hip-hop; experimental hip-hop
- Length: 10:10
- Label: Tartown; Profile
- Songwriters: Rammellzee; K-Rob
- Producer: Jean-Michel Basquiat

"Beat Bop" is a song by American hip-hop artists Rammellzee and K-Rob. It was produced and arranged by Jean-Michel Basquiat. Initially, it was made as a test pressing by Tartown Inc. in 1983. That same year, the song was released as a single by Profile Records, and featured in the hip-hop documentary film Style Wars (1983).

Due to the rarity of its original pressing and the cover art by Basquiat, "Beat Bop" is among the most valuable rap records ever made. In 2017, Rolling Stone magazine ranked it among the "100 Greatest Hip-Hop Songs of All Time."

== Background ==
Jean-Michel Basquiat rose to prominence as a street artist writing on the walls of Lower Manhattan as SAMO. He was immersed in the Downtown music scene with his experimental band Gray before becoming a successful painter. Basquiat befriended graffiti artists Rammellzee and Toxic and invited them to accompany him to Los Angeles while he prepared for his exhibition at the Gagosian Gallery. The trio are depicted in Basquiat's paintings Hollywood Africans in front of the Chinese Theater with Footprints of Movie Stars (1983) and Hollywood Africans (1983).

Toxic recalled that "Beat Bop" was inspired by an impromptu jam session. "Madonna was staying at Jean's place while he was in LA. I was there with my friends Trace and General EMC. She let us up ... I was playing the drum machine and Madonna started playing the keyboard. My friend started emceeing. We took Jean's turntable and scratched. Jean heard the tape," he said.

The actual "Beat Bop" record became a showdown between Rammellzee and 15-year-old battle rapper K-Rob. Basquiat had heard K-Rob rap at an event in the East Village and invited him to a recording session with Rammellzee. The result was a ten-minute track produced and arranged by Basquiat. It was released independently in a reported run of just 500 copies on Basquiat’s own Tartown Inc. imprint featuring his art on the cover. It was also distributed by Profile Records, without his artwork, in 1983 and later in 2001.

== Recording and release ==
"Beat Bop"
This 30 second sample exhibits vocals by Rammellzee from the first half of the track. Heavy use of reverb on his voice can be heard, as well as a distorted violin sample towards the end.

Although Rammellzee initially denied Basquiat's role on the record, he later confirmed his musical involvement. K-Rob said, "Jean-Michel made the beat. Listen to the beat: That is Jean-Michel. That's the type of person Jean-Michel is." Basquiat's friend, writer Glenn O'Brien, said: "His band Gray was really an interesting band — even though they weren't real musicians, they had this great musical sensibility, and I think that, in a way, 'Beat Bop' has a bit of that Gray sound to it, that sort of dub-space thing, a lot of space in the music, a lot of echo."

Basquiat booked a session at a studio in Manhattan and hired Al Diaz, his former SAMO collaborator, as a session musician. Diaz said, "Sekou Bunch, I think he was a house musician at [the studio], came up with the riff, the little skanky guitar riff and the bass line per Jean's approval. Eszter Balint came a little later to the session and played the violin. I played a rack with cowbells, a go-go bell, and woodblocks that were all on a percussion rack, and timbales."

Basquiat had written verses for Rammellzzee and K-Rob them which they rejected. Rammellzee recalled, "We crushed up his paper with the words he had written down and we threw it back at him, face first. Then we said, 'We're gonna go in these two booths,' and [I said], 'I'm gonna play pimp on the corner' and K-Rob said, 'I'll play schoolboy coming home from school,' and then it went on. According to Rammellzee, Basquiat wanted to rhyme on the record, but K-Rob refuted that assertion.

Over ten minutes long, with no definite chorus or structure, the track is epic in scope, featuring a driving bassline that underpins the track and a heavy influence from both disco and funk. The lyrical abstraction present on "Beat Bop" is often praised; writing for The Guardian, Chris Campion commented that "people have been trying to decipher it ever since." The vocals are delivered in a relaxed, chaotic and almost stream of consciousness manner, often overlapping themselves, with both rappers occasionally adopting fake voices. Rammellzee's vocal delivery has been cited by AllMusic as a clear example of his "flights of wordplay, fantasy, and street surrealism." A heavy amount of reverb is applied to the vocals in a seemingly random manner, sometimes during the middle of sentences. The track ends by fading out during the middle of a verse, offering the listener no definite conclusion.

Cory Robbins, founder of Profile Records, heard "Beat Bop" from a DJ named John Hall. Robbins reached out to Basquiat and offered him a contract to release the track as a single. Basquiat received a $1,500 advance on the record and he was entitled to half the royalties. The record sold about 5,000 copies or less. Profile licensed it to Island Records in the UK and they put it on a compilation album. "We [would’ve] lost money on it, if not for that money from England," Robbins said.

B-side label

== Cover art ==
The original test pressing feature art designed by Jean-Michel Basquiat. The artwork of the record are typical of his graffiti-influenced style, chaotic clash of imagery and text. In contrast to his colorful canvas work, however, they are drawn in black and white. The front cover includes his crown motif, rough sketches of bones, an explosion (and within it, the word "bang!" in capital letters), and Roman numerals.

The single was released by Profile sans Basquiat's artwork. Cory Robbins recalled: The worst thing I did was… He said, 'I'll make new artwork for your release.' And I said, 'No, no, no, we’re just gonna put it in the Profile jacket.' And that was really stupid. That [painting] would probably be worth millions now. But I'm in the record business — I knew very little about art back then."

The cover spells Rammellzee's name incorrectly, using only one L instead of two, a fact that irked Rammellzee even in the years following the record's release. The single was repressed in 2001 by Tartown Records, the label that initially released it, with its original cover art retained.

== Legacy ==
The theme for Style Wars, a documentary film that focuses on graffiti and other areas of hip hop culture, "Beat Bop" is largely typical of early 1980s New York hip hop music. Due to Basquiat's fame, original copies sell for upwards of $1,500, making it among the most valuable rap records ever made. It has been cited as one of the essential records of old school hip hop, alongside more popular tracks like "Rapper's Delight" and "The Message." Rolling Stone magazine ranked it No. 79 on its list of the "100 Greatest Hip-Hop Songs of All Time."

The single has been described as a blueprint for the "apocalyptic, witty, and experimental" style of later experimental hip-hop artists such as Antipop Consortium and El-P. The track has even been thought to provide a stylistic basis for more famous groups, such as Cypress Hill and Beastie Boys. Influential British DJ Tim Westwood is known to have been a big fan of the track.

On his 2004 debut full-length release, Bi-Conicals of the Rammellzee, Rammellzee reunited with K-Rob to record "Beat Bop Part 2". Though K-Rob was now a "full fledged Muslim", devoting his time to prayers and preaching rather than music, Rammellzee was happy with the result: "I thought it was fantastic the second time around... this time me and K-Rob were doing fine without crushing up papers and being stalled by a person who wanted things to be done his way."

A portion of the song was sampled in Beastie Boys' 1994 track, "B-Boys Makin' With The Freak Freak", providing a background vocal loop.

== Personnel ==
- Vocals – Rammellzee, K-Rob
- Percussion – Al Diaz
- Guitar – Sekou Bunch
- Violin – Eszter Balint
- Production & arrangement – Jean-Michel Basquiat
