= Al Diaz (artist) =

American artist and lecturer

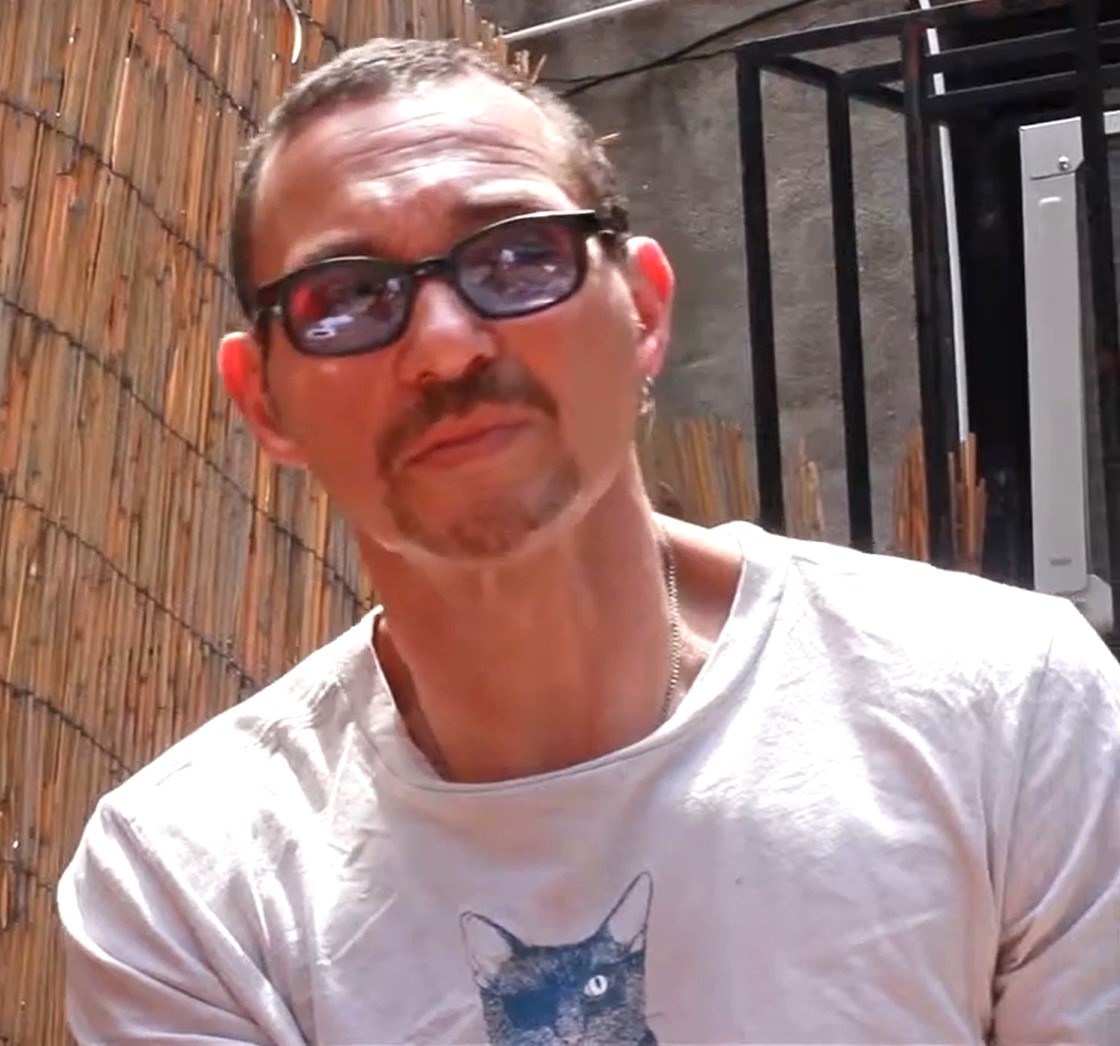
- Diaz in 2015
- Born: June 10, 1959 (age 67); Bellevue Hospital, New York City, U.S.
- Known for: graffiti, urban art, contemporary art
- Movement: contemporary art, graffiti
- Website: al-diaz.com

Al Diaz (born June 10, 1959) is an American urban artist and lecturer best known for being among the first generation of graffiti writers in the community and for co-creating the graffiti campaign SAMO© with Jean-Michel Basquiat in 1978.

== Early life ==
Diaz was born on June 10, 1959 in Bellevue Hospital in Kips Bay, Manhattan to Puerto Rican parents who migrated to New York in 1955.

== Graffiti ==
In 1971, Diaz was first introduced to the burgeoning graffiti culture by his older cousin Gilberto "SIETE" Diaz when he was just 12 years old. His cousin lived in Washington Heights, which was a locus of graffiti production at the time, and taught Diaz about the traditional style of writing graffiti: combining a moniker, or nickname, with a number. Diaz tagged under the name "BOMB-1" because of his explosive personality. Taking what he learned in Washington Heights to the Lower East Side where he lived, Diaz started skipping classes to practice his graffiti and was asked to leave his high school to attend alternative school, City-As-School, in Brooklyn Heights. While at a mutual friend's house, Diaz met Basquiat and the pair became friends, eventually conceptualizing SAMO© initially as an inside joke. Along with a few other students, Diaz and Basquiat started a newspaper called Basement Blues Press and for the Spring 1977 issue, Basquiat wrote a piece about an imaginary religion called SAMO.

=== SAMO© ===
Co-created by Diaz and Basquiat in 1978, SAMO©, which is shorthand for "same old", disrupted what was standard practice for graffiti at the time. Instead of tagging the more formulaic nickname and number combination that Diaz had learned from his cousin, the pair scribbled phrases in public space throughout Lower Manhattan that were poetic and sarcastic and intended as provocations for any person who encountered them. SAMO© soon gained visibility among graffiti peers and in the press. For instance, The Village Voice published a feature on SAMO© in 1978, which brought artworld visibility to the duo and put an end to their street anonymity. Diaz wanted to remain anonymous whereas Basquiat wanted to leverage the visibility of SAMO© to launch his career. After the Village Voice article was published, Basquiat appeared on Glenn O'Brien's television show TV Party as SAMO© without Diaz present, claiming work under that name was done by him alone. In 1979, the collaboration ended and "SAMO© IS DEAD" was spray-painted across New York City.

=== Later work ===
After SAMO© disbanded, Diaz took a break from writing graffiti, working in construction and carpentry instead. In 2016, Diaz returned to artmaking and reinvigorated SAMO©, also impacting Basquiat's career legacy. Today, Diaz makes work from liberated New York metro signs that he cuts up and re-configures into his own text from the preexisting signage letters.

== Music ==
During the 1980s, Diaz turned his focus to music. In 1983, Diaz was featured as a percussionist on "Beat Bop", a single featuring rappers K-Rob and Rammellzee and produced by Basquiat.

== Exhibitions ==
In 2017, the Barbican Art Gallery in London mounted an exhibition, Basquiat: Boom for Real, that featured the duo's SAMO© work. That same year, Diaz participated in a benefit auction hosted by Artsy in support of the ACLU. In 2018, the artist mounted a pop-up exhibition at The Same Old Gallery in Basquiat's last known residence, showcasing his work alongside work by contemporary graffiti writers. Also in 2018, Diaz's work was included in the Beyond the Streets exhibition, curated by Roger Gastman. In 2022, Diaz's work was the subject of Cultural Goods Gallery's inaugural exhibition in Toronto. In 2023, Diaz created an exhibition at Howl! called City of Kings that brought together narratives, photographs, videos and ephemera from 1970s and 80s graffiti icons exploring the interplay of politics, economics and the practice of art.

== Museum collections ==
Diaz painted an installation on the walls of the Maier Museum of Art at Randolph College in Virginia.

== Awards ==
In 2019, Diaz received a signed and embossed award from then-Mayor of New York City, Bill de Blasio, for his graffiti contributions to the city, specifically his SAMO tags. Such a recognition would have been unthinkable during the 1970s and 80s when Diaz and Basquiat were writing as SAMO since then-Mayor Ed Koch was especially punitive of graffiti, calling for "wild wolves" to be used to protect parked subway trains.
