= Tomorrow's Television Tonight =

American talk show

- Genre: Talk show
- Presented by: Nicholas "Nick" Yanni
- Country of origin: United States
- Original language: English

Production
- Producer: Manhattan / Metro Access (various)
- Production location: New York, New York
- Running time: c. 30–60 minutes

Original release
- Release: 1978 – 1984

Tomorrow’s Television Tonight was a New York City public-access television talk and interview program broadcast in the late 1970s and early 1980s. The show was hosted by television critic Nicholas "Nick" Yanni and featured interviews with actors, writers, performers, and cultural figures. It is remembered for its low-budget, live aesthetic and its place within Manhattan’s early cable-access culture.

== Format and production ==
The program was produced for Manhattan Cable’s access channels (often called Channel D / Metro Access) and aired weekly. Episodes consisted of on-stage interviews and conversations, sometimes with musical or performance interludes. Production values were modest and the show was often performed live, creating a spontaneous, occasionally improvised feel that commentators have compared to early broadcast television.

== Host ==
Nicholas A. "Nick" Yanni Jr., a television critic and writer active in New York media, created and hosted the series. Yanni had contributed to arts publications and used the program as a forum to discuss television, theater, and the arts while interviewing guests from those worlds. He died in 1984; the New York Times obituary noted that Tomorrow’s Television Tonight had been his principal project. The Coca Crystal Show had a memorial episode dedicated to Yanni and his contributions to public access television.

== Notable guests ==
Surviving clips and program guides indicate that the series hosted a wide range of guests. Uploads to video-sharing platforms identify appearances by performers including John Goodman, Jane Krakowski, and Nathan Lane, among others. Because the show has not been systematically archived, the full guest list and episode order remain incomplete.

== Reception and legacy ==
Tomorrow’s Television Tonight was among the many experimental programs that comprised Manhattan cable access in the late 1970s and early 1980s. Commentators note its “teetering on the edge of chaos” live energy and its role in giving performers an informal platform at a moment when cable was expanding as an alternative to mainstream networks.

== Episodes and archival status ==
Limited episodes and references to episodes can be found in various collections. The New York Public Library has Three Interviews with Billie Mahoney, Phil Schapiro, Nick Yanni which features an interview from the show. An episode featuring Jaime Davidovich can be found in Jaime Davidovich's papers at New York University's Fales Library. Additional episodes survive in private hands and on online video platforms.
