= Palampore =

18th and 19th century Indian textile exports

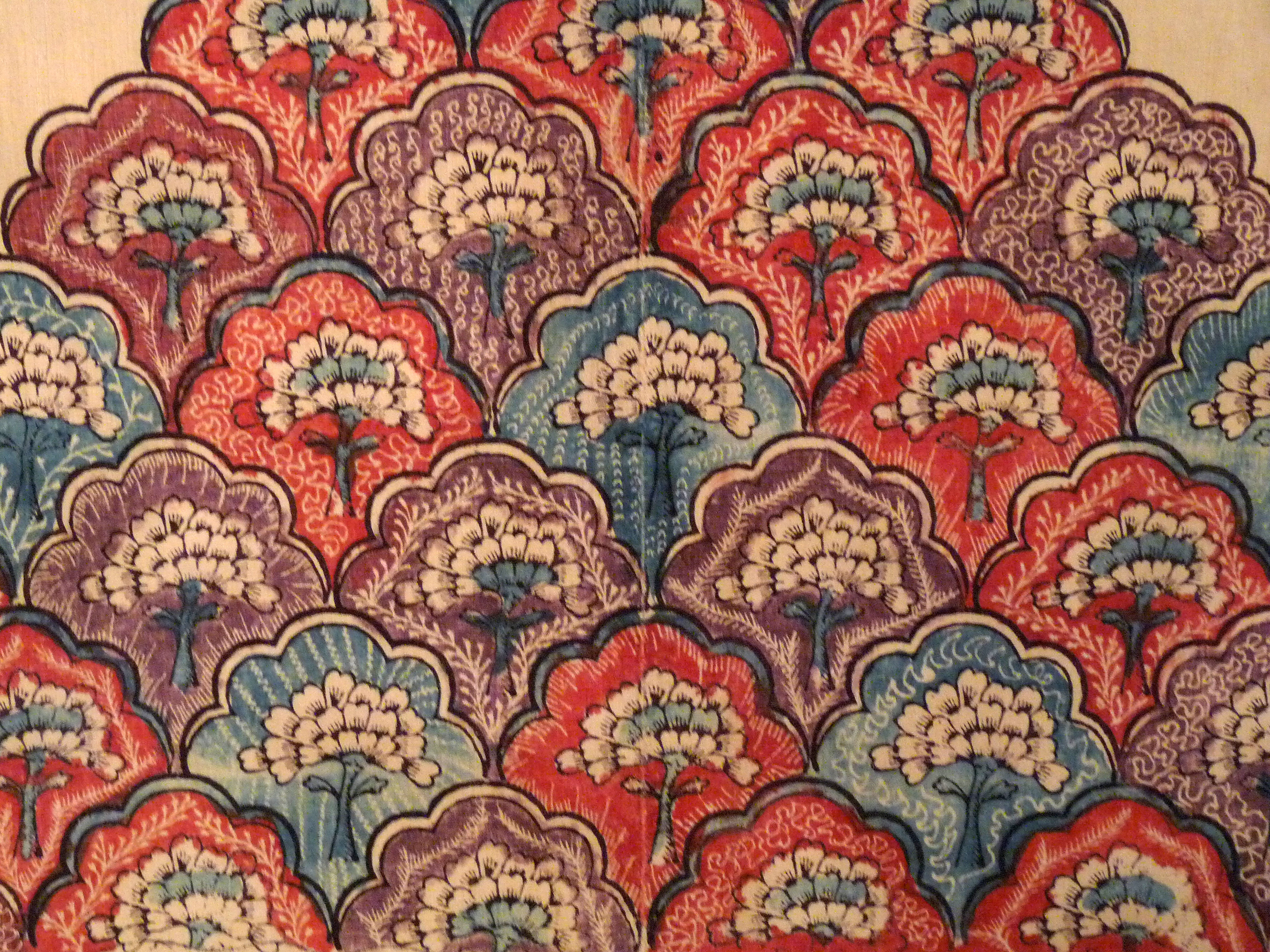
Palempore with peacock design (detail), second half of 18th century, Coromandel Coast.

A palampore or (Palempore) is a type of hand-painted and mordant-dyed bed cover or hanging panel that was made in India for the export market during the eighteenth century and nineteenth century.

== Origins ==
Palampores were produced on the Coromandel Coast. Palampore were recorded as being traded in Salem in the 18th Century.

The term palampore may come from palangposh, a term for bedcover from Hindi "palang" (bed) and Persian "posh" (cover) or from Palanpur, the northwest Indian trading town.

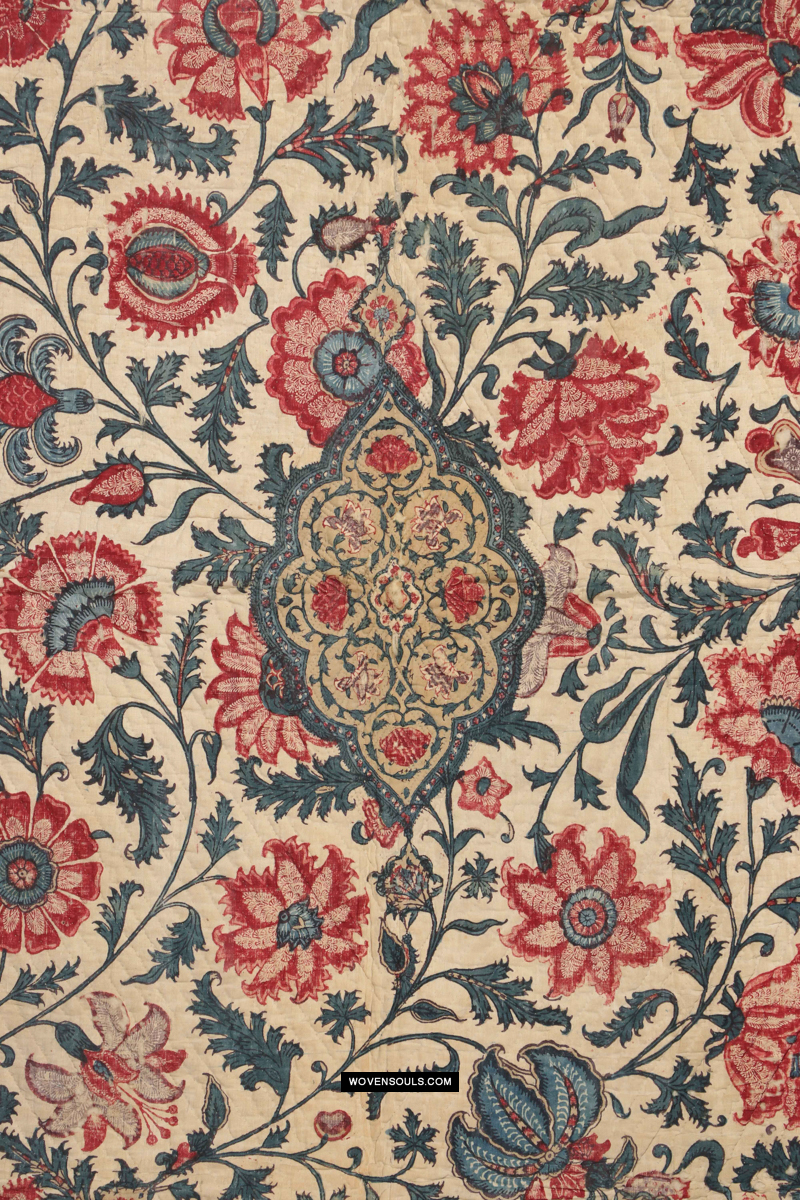
Antique Quilted Palampore Chintz Indian Textile courtesy of the Wovensouls collection, Singapore

== Technique ==
Palampores were mordant-painted and resist-dyed. A palampore was made using the kalamkari technique, whereby an artist drew designs on cotton or linen fabric with a kalam pen containing mordant and then dipped the textile in dye. The dye adhered to the cloth only where the mordant had been applied. This lengthy process had to be repeated for each color in the design. Small details were then painted by hand on the cloth after the dying process was completed.

Analysis indicates that some palampores were produced using chay root dye to create colours in the red and brown range.

Some palampores had embroidery of chain stitch worked in silk thread.

== Design ==
Palampore patterns were usually very complex and elaborate, depicting a wide variety of plants, flowers, and animals, including peacocks, elephants, and horses. Because a palampore was hand-created, each design is unique, but many featured a central flowering tree with a mound at the base where there may be animals.

Design historians have noted the similarities between palampores and crewel embroidery and suggested that English trends may have influenced what East India Company directors commissioned in India.

Palampore made for Persia and the Mughal courts were more likely to be more formal and symmetrical in design. They depicted architectural structures, shrubs and tent interiors.

== Use ==
Palampore was popular in the Mughal and Deccan Courts. The borders of these pieces were block printed while the centre depicted intricate designs, made by hand.

Palampores were exported to Europe and to Dutch colonists in Indonesia and what was then called Ceylon (now known as Sri Lanka).

Palampore were labour-intensive to produce, and the light fabric they were made from is fragile, therefore, the few examples that have survived are often quite valuable today.

== Impact ==
Palampores predated European production of printed-textiles and influenced innovations in chemicals and techniques used in Europe, and improvements in quality.

In a domestic setting, American and European embroiderers cut around Indian printed cotton designs and attached them to quilts.

English printers began to copy palampore designs using block printing methods with a large-scale repeat to create fabric that could be used for curtains or bedding. In France, the Braquenié fabric house produced designs inspired by palampores from the 1800s.
