= Pay the Rent =

Pay the Rent may refer to:

== Songs ==
- "Pay the Rent" (Green Apple Quick Step song), 1993
- "Pay the Rent" (Rammellzee song), 2004

== Other uses ==
- Pay the Rent, an art installation by Australian artist Richard Bell
- Pay the Rent (movement), an Aboriginal Australian campaign led by Lidia Thorpe and others
- "Pay the Rent" (The Price Is Right), a segment game on the game show The Price Is Right

== See also ==
- Pay the Rent or Feed the Kids, book by Mel Hurtig
- Rent Money (disambiguation)
