= Judith Henry =

Judith Henry may refer to:

- Judith Henry (actress) (born 1968), French actress
- Judith Henry (artist) (born 1942), American artist
