= Stelmanis =

Stelmanis may refer to two different genera of plants:

- Stelmanis Raf. (1837), a taxonomic synonym for Heterotheca
- Stelmanis Raf. (1840), a taxonomic synonym for Oldenlandia
