= JoAnn Berman =

American fashion designer

JoAnn Berman (born May 5, 1957) is an American born fashion designer and furniture designer. She is widely known for upcycling reconstructive clothing, alongside her early 1990s contribution to hip hop and reggaeton style of dress.

Most notably, Berman was pivotal in creating the definitive looks of pop rave, hip hop, reggaeton and gangster style seen in her work with Jodeci, P. Diddy, Heavy D, Proyecto Uno and Michael Jackson. As recorded in Valerie Steele's Fifty Years of Fashion: New Look to Now, Berman is known by many as the "Queen of Reconstruction", especially given the reconstructions of her adored blue denim "prison" suits throughout her career.

With Berman's recent 2015 Smithsonian Institution induction in the American History Museum, Berman's impactful contributions in the representation of such style, particularly with Proyecto Uno will be in the permanent collection.

== Early life and education ==
Born in Manhattan, New York, Berman grew up in the Bronx and at the age of 7, started recycling old clothing. By the age of 15, she was working for notable, steel sculptor, Richard Shore, fabricating welded pieces for Storm King Art Center and Newark Airport. By 17, Berman decided to follow the punk rock movement to San Francisco, CA where she enrolled in The San Francisco Art Institute. While at The San Francisco Art Institute, Berman, furthering her interest in welded Cor-ten steel sculpting, majored in sculpture creation. Shortly after beginning her time at The San Francisco Art Institute, she started her career creating clothes for bands such as The San Francisco Mutants and vocalist, Silke Berlinn. During this period, Berman also attended Berkeley California for liberal arts, participating in Angela Davis's Women's Studies class as a student. Following her time at Berkeley, she returned to New York in 1979. Then in 1979, she met Bruce Douglas, an English bass player with the band Snatch, which included Douglas, Patty Palladin, and Judy Nylon. Berman and Douglas fell in love and shortly, thereafter, Berman joined Snatch as the keyboard player. Playing Max's Kansas City, CBGB's, and The Squat Theatre opening for Nico, Snatch then went to England in late 1979 for a tour, which never took place. Despite the tour not taking place, Berman and Douglas, still in love, decided to marry in London, where Berman worked at The Screen on The Hill Movie Theater. Berman, then, proceeded to be accepted to attend Central St. Martin's. While attending Central St.Martin's, she worked for designer, Zhandra Rhodes and followed the wave of punk via Vivienne Westwood, Malcolm McLaren.

== Career ==
Continuing on into a turbulent time of the advent of punk rock, Berman pursued her costume design career at Club 57 St. Mark's Place in the East Village. With Club 57, catering to the likes of Keith Haring, Jean-Michel Basquiat, Kenny Scharf, Berman created costumes for the musical, "Boeing Boeing". Additionally, while working at Club 57, Berman worked at FOOD Restaurant in Soho with her co-worker being Cookie Mueller. Following her work at Club 57 and FOOD Restaurant, Berman started creating one-of-a-kind, high-end bustiers that were sold at Patricia Field's store on 8th Street in Greenwich Village. In September 1988, she met Al Diaz at Dogbrothers recording studio on Ludlow St. on the Lower East Side. Al Diaz, being Jean-Michel's writing partner of SAMO, became her common-law husband for 12 years. They traveled immediately to Costa Rica in 1988, and became inseparable despite Al's intense battle with drugs.

On return to the Lower East Side, Berman began to dream about creating a thug-gangsta look for the up-and-coming hip hop bands of that moment. She, then, created in her loft on Rivington St., an iconic suit known as simply, "The Jail Suit." The Jail Suit was then sold at Patricia Field's store under "JoAnn Berman is BOIY KRAZI". Immediately after seeing these suits at Patricia's, then P. Diddy, known as Puff Daddy at the time, called Berman to request suits for his new group, Jodeci.

She created those suits and sent them to him at Uptown Records three days later. Two weeks later, Puff Daddy requested more. Two weeks after that, Puff Daddy called Berman again and requested they meet at her studio at 109 W. 27th St. for what was known as "the surprise." He arrived to her studio with Heavy D. Al Diaz was present as well. Berman was given an order for four jail suits for Heavy D to wear in Michael Jackson's 1992 "Jam" video, that would soon become some of her most notable pieces. A month later, Michael Jackson's 1992 "Jam" video premiered on MTV and Berman's career skyrocketed.

After the release of the "Jam" video, her iconic designs, appeared in Paper Magazine, Italian Vogue with Cindy Crawford, American Vogue, and The New York Times Style page. She continued to create looks for the tours of Jodeci, as well as Salt n' Pepa and Proyecto Uno. She even went on to create designs for Joe Public's "This One is For You" video. At this point in her career, Berman took the time off to travel to Mexico with Diaz, where they camped through the jungles of Chiapas and notably, Palenque, which changed her life. The mysteriousness and magic of Mexico, then, grew to become a huge influence in the development of her aesthetic upon her return to New York. When Berman returned to New York, she focused on taking care of Diaz, exhausting her emotional and mental energy. She had to stop and close her business, BOIY KRAZI.

After closing BOIY KRAZI, in 1998, Berman and Diaz parted ways amicably. Berman, then, went on to teach in East Harlem and acquired a studio on 3rd Avenue and 119th St in East Harlem. In addition to teaching, for some time now, Berman had been silk screen printing with the screens she had kept from BOIY KRAZI. Inspired by her travels in Mexico and her day-to-day visuals of the then, rough East Harlem, Latin gangsters, she then met Fabio Anzolin Borges, a student at AMDA who became her best friend. Borges was a Brazilian actor from Florianopolis. Borges and Berman would often spend entire days dreaming of 17th century Brazil and as a result, Berman created and became more passionate with her imagery of re-vamped Afro-Brazilian art, history and culture. Berman then opened her first store, BOIY KRAZI, in 2007 on 112th Street and 2nd Ave. Rihanna was her first customer, whose then single, "Umbrella", was number 1 on the charts.

Within a month, Berman's store was burned to the ground and was under an arson investigation. After this trauma, Berman regrouped and moved to Brooklyn, N.Y. After moving to Brooklyn, Berman with Leonel Logrono, a Dominican sewing machine repairman, whom she married in 2005. She then proceeded to open another store in Williamsburg, BOIY KRAZI'S GROOVI GARDENS. BOIY KRAZI GROOVI GARDENS stayed open from February 2008 to late 2008. Shortly thereafter, Berman opened her third store, Thug Mama, on N4th St. in Williamsburg in 2011. FURNITURE

Before her store burned to the ground in 2007, Berman took her textiles and began creating upcycled furniture as art. Using her printed fabrics and antique frames, she began reupholstering furniture.

In 2008, Berman resumed her fashion career in Bushwick in Brooklyn, N.Y. She became the premiere designer at The Green Shows. Berman showed in Fashion Week and received the 2011 Ecco-Domini Semi-Finalist award in Sustainable Clothing. She also received Time Out Magazine's and WWD's Breakout Designer award. Berman sewed, printed and patterned everything herself. Berman also appeared on the premiere episode of Lifetime Television's " A 24 Hr. Catwalk", which she won.

After frustration with the clothing industry and her approach to her clothing being a one-of-a-kind, reconstructed art piece, Berman turned completely to furniture. Her upcycled Chrome chair appeared in the Thanksgiving issue of the 2013 NY Magazine's The Cut's Best Bet. She then appeared on the April 2014 cover of New York Cottages and Gardens for her mini-rock star arm chairs.
