= Steding =

Steding is a surname. Notable people with the surname include:

- Brittany Rae Steding, American professional wrestler
- Katy Steding (born 1967), American basketball player
- Stephan Steding (born 1982), German javelin thrower
- Walter Steding (1950–2025), American artist and musician
