= Hollywood Africans =

1983 painting by Jean-Michel Basquiat

- Artist: Jean-Michel Basquiat
- Year: 1983
- Medium: Acrylic and oilstick on canvas
- Movement: Neo-expressionism
- Dimensions: 210 cm × 210 cm (84 in × 84 in)
- Location: Whitney Museum of American Art, New York

Hollywood Africans is a painting created by American artist Jean-Michel Basquiat in 1983. The artwork is Basquiat's response to the portrayals of African Americans in the entertainment industry.

== Background ==
Basquiat started as a street artist writing graffiti as SAMO, then became immersed in the Downtown art and music scene. He was in an experimental band called Gray, but he was also connected to the emerging Hip-Hop movement.

Basquiat was friends with graffiti artists such as Fab 5 Freddy, Toxic and Ramellzee. In 1983, Basquiat produced the hip-hop single "Beat Bop" by Rammellzee and K-Rob, the cover of which he created.

Ramellzee and Toxic accompanied Basquiat to Venice, Los Angeles while he prepared for his March 1983 show, his second at the Gagosian Gallery in West Hollywood. While in Los Angeles, the trio called themselves "The Hollywood Africans" as social statement to counter the stereotypical portrayals of African Americans in Hollywood.

During this trip, Basquiat painted Hollywood Africans, which recounts a day when he and his friends "had their pictures taken in a photo booth and looked at movie stars' footprints."

== Analysis ==
Set to a golden yellow backdrop, at the center of Hollywood Africans is a self-portrait of Basquiat and his friends, artists Toxic and Rammellzee, who accompanied him to Los Angeles. To the upper right of the depiction of Basquiat are the numerals 12, 22, and 60, which is his birthdate (December 22, 1960).

As he often did in his works, Basquiat crossed out some words and phrases. He explained that this was actually meant to direct attention to them, "I cross out words so you will see them more; the fact that they are obscured makes you want to read them."

Across the canvas are phrases such as "HOLLYWOOD AFRICANS FROM THE NINETEEN FORTIES" and "WHAT IS BWANA?" which indicate Basquiat is questioning the depictions of African Americans in film during the Golden Age of Hollywood. Bwana is the Swahili word for master or boss. The date 1940, written at the top of the painting, may refer to the year actress Hattie McDaniel became the first African American to win an Oscar for playing "Mammy" in Gone With The Wind (1939).

With the notations "TOBACCO," "SUGAR CANE," "GANGSTERISM," and the title of the artwork, "HOLLYWOOD AFRICANS," Basquiat seems aware of the limited roles given to African Americans in both Hollywood and real life due to discrimination. The notations can also be interpreted as the new products built by Africans that Hollywood is exporting. On the left side of the painting are blue footprints, referring to the footprints of movie stars outside of the Grauman's Chinese Theatre on the historic Hollywood Walk of Fame. Basquiat and his posse are challenging the perception of three young black men in Hollywood and are cementing their place in history.

== Exhibitions ==
Hollywood Africans is part of the permanent collection at the Whitney Museum of American Art in New York. In 2017, it was exhibited at the Barbican Centre in London as part of Basquiat: Boom for Real. In 2020, the artwork was displayed at the Museum of Fine Arts, Boston for its exhibit, Writing the Future: Basquiat and the Hip-Hop Generation.

== See also ==
- List of paintings by Jean-Michel Basquiat
- 1983 in art
