= Oldenlandia aretioides =

Conservation status
- Data Deficient (IUCN 3.1)

Scientific classification
- Kingdom: Plantae
- Clade: Tracheophytes
- Clade: Angiosperms
- Clade: Eudicots
- Clade: Asterids
- Order: Gentianales
- Family: Rubiaceae
- Genus: Oldenlandia
- Species: O. aretioides

Binomial name
- Oldenlandia aretioides Vierh. (1906)

Species of plant

Oldenlandia aretioides is a species of flowering plant in the family Rubiaceae. It is a subshrub endemic to northwestern and southeastern Socotra in Yemen. It was collected in the 19th Century near Qallansiyah and near Wadi Faleng at opposite ends of the island, and hasn't been seen since. It is similar to O. pulvinata, but with smaller leaves and calyx.
