= Rent Money =

Rent Money may refer to:

- "Rent Money" (The Knights of Prosperity), an episode of The Knights of Prosperity
- "Rent Money" (Bodger & Badger), an episode of Bodger & Badger
- "Rent Money", a song by Future form the album Future
- "Rent Money", a song by Young Trimm featuring The-Dream; see The-Dream discography
- "Rent Money", a song by Mary J. Blige featuring Dave East from the album Good Morning Gorgeous

== See also ==
- Pay the Rent (disambiguation)
