= Oldenlandia vasudevanii =

Scientific classification
- Kingdom: Plantae
- Clade: Tracheophytes
- Clade: Angiosperms
- Clade: Eudicots
- Clade: Asterids
- Order: Gentianales
- Family: Rubiaceae
- Genus: Oldenlandia
- Species: O. vasudevanii

Binomial name
- Oldenlandia vasudevanii Soumya & Maya

Species of plant

Oldenlandia vasudevanii is a rare plant species in the family Rubiaceae which is found in Karassury region of the Nelliampathi hills in Kerala, India.
