= Jaime Davidovich =

Argentine-American artist

- Born: September 29, 1936; Buenos Aires, Argentina
- Died: August 27, 2016 (aged 79); New York City, New York U.S.
- Other names: Dr. Videovich
- Education: National College; University of Uruguay; School of Visual Arts
- Occupation: Conceptual artist
- Years active: 1956–2016
- Spouse: Judith Henry
- Children: 2

Jaime Davidovich (September 27, 1936 – August 27, 2016) was an Argentine-American conceptual artist and television-art pioneer. His innovative artworks and art-making activities produced several distinct professional reputations including painter, installation artist, video artist, Public-access television cable TV producer, activist, and non-profit organizer. He is the creator of legendary downtown Manhattan cable television program The Live! Show (1979–1984). Billed as "the variety show of the avant-garde", The Live! Show was an eclectic half-hour of live, interactive artistic entertainment inspired by the Dada performance club Cabaret Voltaire and the anarchic humor of American television comedian Ernie Kovacs.

== Early life and education ==
Davidovich was born in Buenos Aires, Argentina to Lucio Davidovich and Clara Davidovich (née Jacif). His parents were Jewish immigrants from Ukraine.

When Davidovich was eight years old he contracted rheumatic fever and was bedridden for several months. It was during which time his parents introduced him to art materials to pass the time.

In 1948 when he was 12 years old, Davidovich began to study art under his cousin Simón Feldman during which time he became interested in the work of Paul Cézanne, Henri Matisse and Pablo Picasso. Davidovich later worked under the Hungarian cubist artist Aurel Kessler.

In 1958, Davidovich received a bachelor's degree from the National College in Buenos Aires. In 1961, he received a degree from the University of Uruguay. In 1963, he received a degree from the School of Visual Arts in New York City.

== Career ==
=== Visual art ===
Davidovich began exhibiting his paintings in 1956 in Argentina, Brazil, and the United States. Interested in space and texture, he experimented with the boundaries of visual artworks first by dissolving the structure of the painting's frame by affixing canvas to walls and then by installing works directly on walls, floors, stairways, and sidewalks.

Adhesive tape came to figure prominently in Davidovich's work, initially as a means to affix canvas to walls and subsequently as an artistic medium itself; he would go on to exhibit throughout Argentine museums and art galleries, as well as in Iowa, New York, Ohio, Belgium, Brazil, Colombia, Cuba, France, Germany, Iran, Italy and Spain; he resided in New York City until his death.

The emergence of portable video equipment in the late 1960s dovetailed with Davidovich's existing interest in minimalism and the aesthetics of line. Davidovich's single channel video works "Road" in 1972 and "3 Mercer Street" in 1975 are some of his earliest video art explorations. These works are noteworthy because of their institutional backing; "Road" was produced with the assistance of the Akron Art Institute in Ohio and "3 Mercer Street" was made possible by a grant from the Creative Arts Public Service (CAPS) program. Davidovich then went on to create video installations, including his "Evita" works developed between 1984–1992 and "Inside and Between" a 1996 work shown at El Museo del Barrio in New York City.

=== Television ===
"I am an Argentinian artist working in New York, in context of an international world and ideas. That's what I am, and that's the way I will be until I die."

– Jaime Davidovich, Jaime Davidovich: In Conversation with / En conversación con Daniel R. Quiles. 2017.

When cable television emerged in the mid-1970s, Jaime Davidovich was one of the first artists to recognize its potential for the contemporary arts. In 1976 he helped establish Cable SoHo. A year later he established the Artists Television Network, a nonprofit organization established to explore the artistic potential of broadcast television and encourage the dissemination of video art through a commercial broadcast medium. The organization produced television programming under the name SoHo Television, a Project of the Artists Television Network, and broadcast on Manhattan public-access television cable TV. Programming included video art, early music videos, performances and interviews with artists including Laurie Anderson, John Cage and Richard Foreman among many others. The organization ceased production in 1984.

Davidovich is perhaps best known for his work on The Live! Show, a weekly public-access television program with a variety show format that appropriated the formal norms of television along with avant-garde performances, artwork, political satire, and social commentary. The program featured interviews and performance work by visiting artists, including Laurie Anderson, Eric Bogosian, Tony Oursler, Stuart Sherman, and Michael Smith, along with musical performances, ersatz commercials, and viewer participation via live call-in segments. Presiding over the show's disparate collaborative elements was Davidovich's own satirical character, Dr. Videovich, a self-proclaimed "specialist in curing television addiction,” whom the New York Times television critic John J. O’Connor described as “a persona somewhere between Bela Lugosi and Andy Kaufman.” The show also featured commercials for Videokitsch, commercially produced items and art multiples made by Davidovich and others. Of The Live! Show, one critic notes, "Davidovich's humor obviously transcends his medium, resulting in a comment as potent today as one assumes it was in 1972—harnessing new media to capture what is 'real' and 'true' is an artistic act both vitally important and profoundly absurd."

== Selected exhibitions ==
In 1991 the American Museum of the Moving Image presented a retrospective of The Live! Show. In 2007 the Museo Nacional Centro de Arte Reina Sofía in Spain added The Live! Show to its collection of video art.

In 2010 Davidovich was honored with a retrospective exhibition at ARTIUM, Centro-Museo Vasco de Arte Contemporaneo in Spain.

Other solo exhibitions include Cabinet, Brooklyn, New York; MAMBA: Museo de Arte Moderno de Buenos Aires; Vanguardia, Bilbao, Spain; and the American Museum of the Moving Image, New York. Davidovich has participated in a wide range of group exhibitions, at institutions such as J. Paul Getty Museum, Los Angeles; 2007 São Paulo Biennial, Brazil; Museo Nacional Centro de Arte Reina Sofía, Madrid, Spain; the Whitney Museum of American Art, New York; Long Beach Museum of Art, California; and the Museum of Modern Art, New York.

Recent solo exhibitions have included: "Jaime Davidovich: Monochromes" (Henrique Faria Fine Art, New York, 2018), "Jaime Davidovich: Adventures of the Avant-Garde" (Bronx Museum of Art, 2015), "Museum of Television Culture" (Churner and Churner, New York, 2013), "Wooster Projects" (Churner and Churner, New York, 2012).

== Selected work ==
- Tape Project, Yellow Tape at Guggenheim Museum in New York (1970/2015)
- Adhesive Tape Project at University of Iowa (1972)
- Cincinnati Tape Piece at the Museum of Modern Art (1972)
- Reality Properties: Fake Estates at the Museum of Modern Art (1975) – Video (7 min.)

== Awards ==
- 1975: New York State Council on the Arts, Creative Artists Public Service Program
- 1978: National Endowment for the Arts Visual Arts fellowship
- 1982: New York State Council on the Arts, Creative Artists Public Service Program
- 1984: National Endowment for the Arts Visual Arts fellowship
- 1990: National Endowment for the Arts Visual Arts fellowship
- 2013-2014: Joan Mitchell Foundation, Creating A Living Legacy (CALL) artist

== See also ==
- TV Party
- The Poetry Project's Public Access Poetry
- Potato Wolf TV by Collaborative Projects (COLAB)
- The Coca Crystal Show: If I Can't Dance, You Can Keep Your Revolution
