= Pierre Frey =

French interior design company

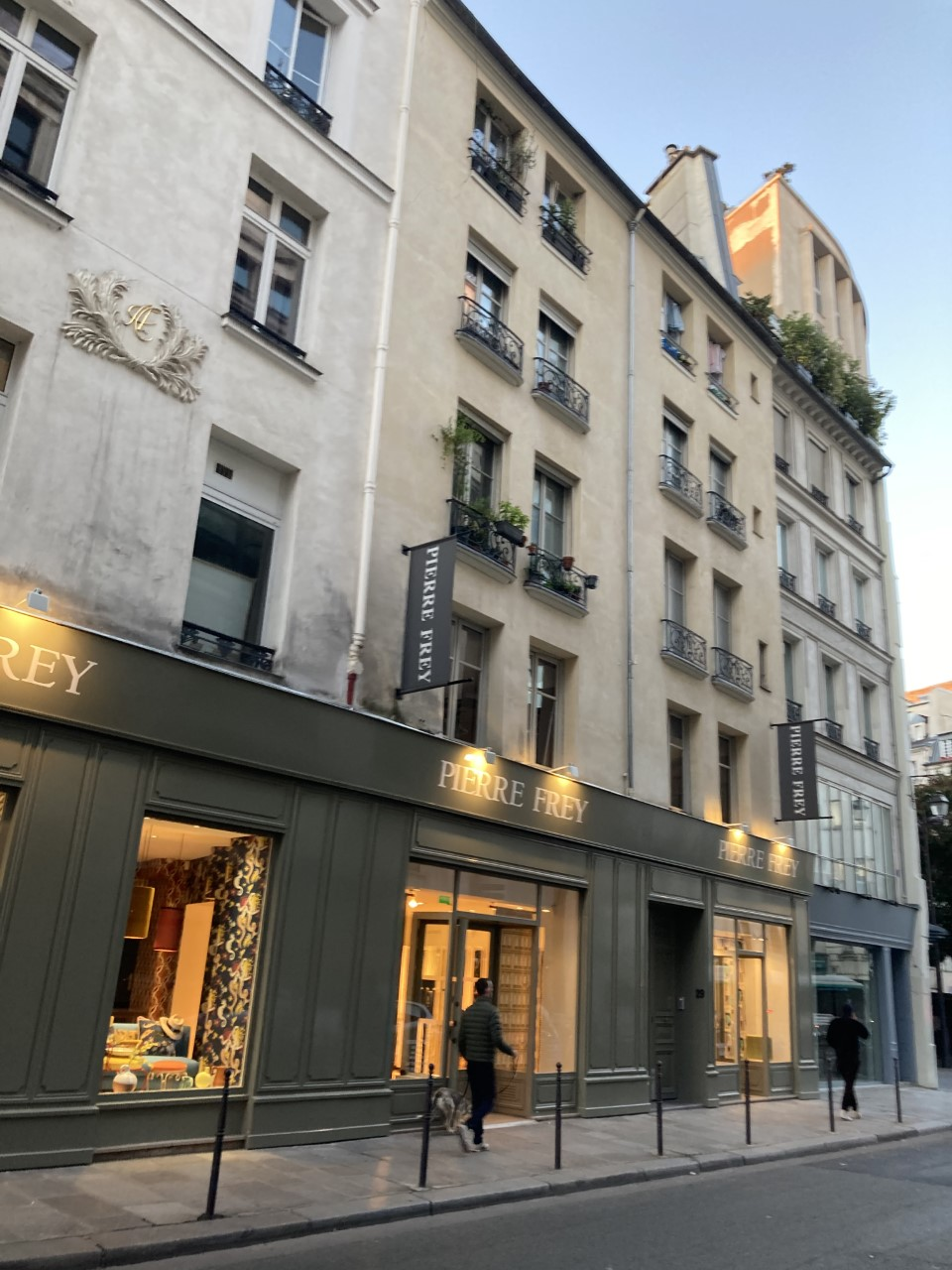
Branch on Rue du Mail, Paris

Pierre Frey SA is a French interior design company founded in 1935 by designer Pierre Frey. The family-owned company designs and manufactures traditional French fabrics, wallpapers, carpets, rugs and furniture.

== Founder ==
Pierre Frey was born on 29 December 1903, to a northern French family. After a first job as a furniture polisher for an antique dealer, he worked with a milliner, then with a fabrics house by the name of Burger. In 1932, he quit his position to manage the Lauer house, another major fabric creator of the time.

== Company history ==
During his time at Lauer house, he convinced its designer, Jean Chatanay, to join him in founding a new company. In 1935, the new company bearing the Frey name was formed.

Today, Pierre Frey SA owns the brand Pierre Frey, as well as the brands Braquenié, Boussac, Fadini Borghi and Le Manach. The company’s collection consists of about 7,000 items with various themes according to the decades, from classic to contemporary. This collection includes the Pierre Frey designs and the collections from the company’s other brands. Today, the company is still a family-owned design house, run by Pierre Frey’s son, Patrick, and his sons, Pierre, Vincent and Matthieu Frey. In 2014, Pierre Frey collaborated with artist Toxic for a collection featuring his designs.

Pierre Frey is member of the Comité Colbert.
