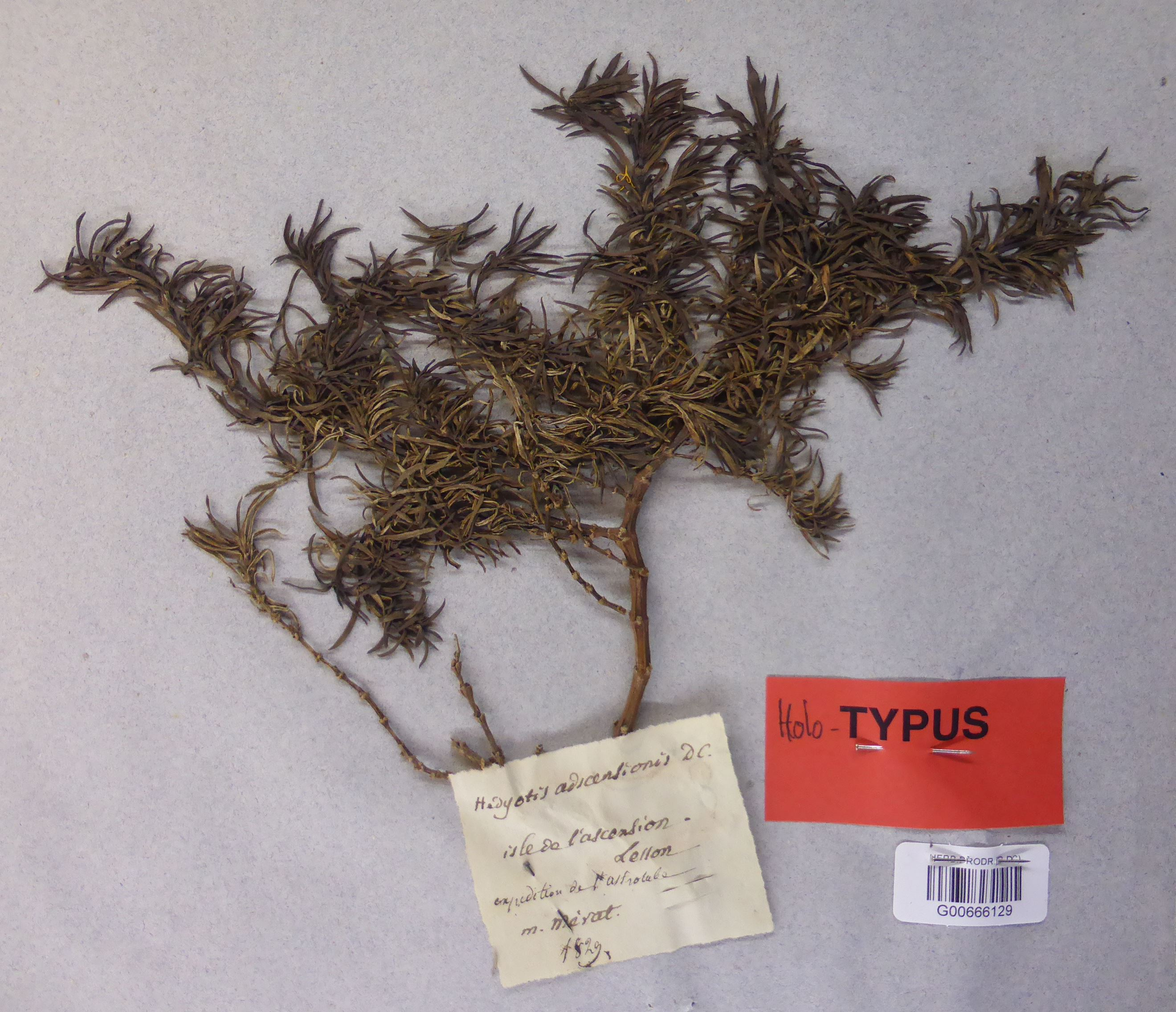
- Photography of the holotype

Conservation status
- Extinct (IUCN 3.1)

Scientific classification
- Kingdom: Plantae
- Clade: Tracheophytes
- Clade: Angiosperms
- Clade: Eudicots
- Clade: Asterids
- Order: Gentianales
- Family: Rubiaceae
- Genus: Oldenlandia
- Species: †O. adscensionis

Binomial name
- †Oldenlandia adscensionis (DC.) Cronk

Synonyms
- Sherardia fruticosa L.; Hedyotis adscensionis DC.

= Oldenlandia adscensionis =

Species of plant

Oldenlandia adscensionis was a species of plant in the family Rubiaceae. It was endemic to Ascension Island. It became extinct due to habitat loss; not seen since 1888.
