= Walter Steding =

American artist, musician and actor (1950–2025)

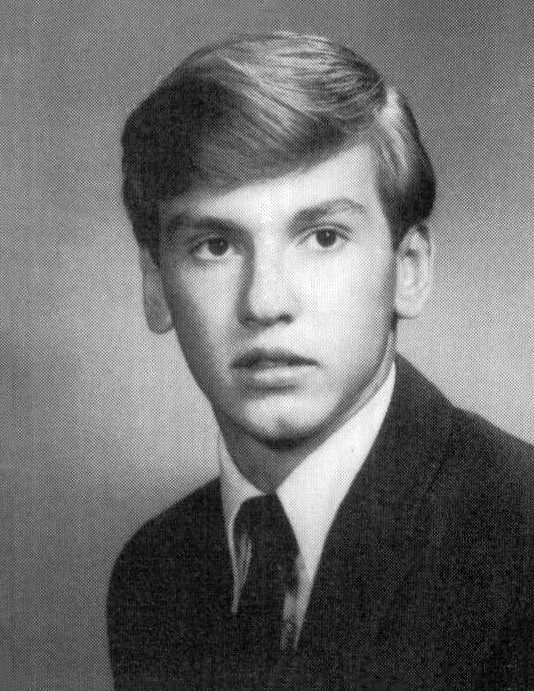
- High school yearbook portrait, 1968
- Born: September 7, 1950; Pittsburgh, Pennsylvania, U.S.
- Died: November 2025 (aged 75); New York City, U.S.
- Occupations: Artist; musician
- Years active: 1972–2025
- Children: 1

Walter George Steding (September 7, 1950 – November 2025) was an American artist and musician. He was associated with the No Wave and punk scenes in New York City. A fixture of the downtown art and music scene, he was known for his experimental performances with electric violin and electronic instruments, as well as his paintings and portraits. Steding worked as an assistant to Pop artist Andy Warhol at the Factory and was briefly managed and produced by Warhol. He performed with or collaborated with artists including Blondie, David Byrne, Jim Carroll, Chic, and Robert Fripp. He also appeared in the films Union City (1980), Polyester (1981), and Downtown 81 (2000). He died in 2025 at the age of 75.

== Early life and education ==
Steding was born on September 7, 1950, in Pittsburgh. His father was a mechanic. When he was eight years old, he moved with his family to Harmony, Pennsylvania. He attended the Ivy School of Professional Art, a commercial art school.

== Career ==
In 1972, Steding moved to New York City, hitchhiking there from Pennsylvania with two brown-bag lunches made by his mother. He moved into a former utility closet in a building off of Union Square. He became a self-taught musician fascinated by "the aesthetics of sound." He performed solo using an electric violin, a custom-built synthesizer, and an EEG machine to track his brainwaves. During gallery performances, he generated strange, high-pitched, and labored sounds on his violin while equipped with a belt-mounted biofeedback device and flashing goggles that were "synced" purportedly with his brain waves.

Steding reached out to the Factory and auditioned for Pop artist Andy Warhol in 1976. His unique performance style so intrigued Andy Warhol that he decided to become his manager, making Steding the only artist he managed after the Velvet Underground. He worked at Warhol's studio mixing paint, stretching canvases, and interacting with famous visitors such as Keith Richards and Georgia O'Keeffe, who would come for lunch and photo sessions for Interview magazine.

Steding was an active member of the New York downtown scene, attending gallery openings and performing at clubs including CBGB, The Ritz, and the Mudd Club. He was the bandleader of TV Party, a public-access cable-TV talk show hosted by Glenn O'Brien.

Steding appeared the films Union City (1980) and Polyester (1981). He also appeared the film Downtown 81 (2000), starring artist Jean-Michel Basquiat. The film explores the early 1980s New York art scene using footage taken in 1980 and 1981.

In 2023, an exhibition, titled This Is My Voice, of Steding's artwork was held at the Howl! gallery in the East Village.

== Personal life ==
Steding had a daughter with Elizabeth Tisdale.

== Death ==
Steding died at his home in Greenpoint, Brooklyn, in November 2025, at the age of 75.
