= Martin Stigsgaard =

Danish-American architect (born 1971)

- Born: Martin Erdmann Stigsgaard; 16 June 1971 (age 55); Denmark
- Education: Royal Danish Academy of Fine Arts; University of Washington
- Occupation: Architect
- Practice: studioSTIGSGAARD
- Buildings: The National WWII Museum
- Website: studiostigsgaard.com

Martin Erdmann Stigsgaard (born 16 June 1971) is a Danish-American architect.

== Early life and education ==
Stigsgaard grew up in Denmark and moved to New York City in 1998.

He earned bachelor's and master's degrees in architecture from the Royal Danish Academy of Fine Arts in Copenhagen and another master's degree in architecture from the University of Washington.

Stigsgaard has taught at the Royal Danish Academy of Fine Arts and the Spitzer School of Architecture in New York, and has served as a design reviewer at the University of Southern California, Columbia University, Woodbury College, Pratt Institute, and Cooper Union. He has lectured and taught at 'T' Space, a multidisciplinary arts organization in Rhinebeck founded by Steven Holl.

== Early career ==
Shortly after the September 11 attacks in 2001, Stigsgaard took part in the recovery and archival work at Ground Zero.

As lead designer for Voorsanger Architects, Stigsgaard led the design of The National WWII Museum in New Orleans, won through a 2003 competition. The project ran about twenty years, and its final phase opened in November 2023. He was also lead designer on the master plan study for the UAE National Military Museum in Abu Dhabi.

In 2007, Stigsgaard founded the art collective New Weather Group, which has exhibited at MoMA PS1 and the Cleveland Sculpture Center.

== studioSTIGSGAARD ==
studioSTIGSGAARD is Stigsgaard's architectural practice, working in architecture, exhibition design, art, and research. Its work has included residential projects in Los Angeles and New York City and a high-rise development in Denver. The firm is collaborating with VoorsangerMathes on master planning and fundraising for a proposed Vietnam War museum in Lubbock, Texas.

In 2018, studioSTIGSGAARD designed the architecture and exhibition layout for Racing for Thunder, a retrospective of the artist Rammellzee at Red Bull Arts in New York City, curated by Max Wolf and Carlo McCormick.

In 2023, the firm was one of five shortlisted to design a memorial in Las Vegas to the victims of the 2017 mass shooting. The firm's entry, designed with Aaron Neubert Architects, was titled the Unity Ribbon Memorial.

The firm's research addresses Indigenous land rights, mass incarceration, migration, and climate resilience. Stigsgaard has worked with Indigenous communities in North, Central, and South America, including a one-year collaboration between Spitzer School of Architecture students and the Tuscarora Nation in upstate New York.

Stigsgaard has criticized the prison-industrial complex and has worked on prison conditions and approaches to reducing recidivism. The studio was nominated for the Cooper Hewitt, Smithsonian Design Museum's National Design Awards in 2021.
