= A-One (graffiti artist) =

American graffiti artist

- Born: Anthony Clark; 1964; Manhattan, New York, United States
- Died: November 11, 2001 (aged 36–37); Paris, France
- Known for: Graffiti art
- Parents: Anthony Eden Clark (father); Janette Gordon Clark (mother)
- Relatives: Ocky Clark (brother)

Anthony Clark (1964 – November 11, 2001), known as A-One, was an American graffiti artist. He developed a style he called "aerosol expressionism".

== Life and career ==
A-One was born in Manhattan in 1964 and grew up in the Mitchel Houses in the South Bronx. He was the son of Janette Gordon Clark and the grandson of Mannie Clark Sr., head caddy at the Mayfair Golf Course in Sanford, Florida in the late 1950s.

He began painting at the age of six, and writing graffiti on subway cars in the mid-1970s. A-One joined Rammellzee's graffiti crew Tag Master Killers, which also consisted of Delta2, Kool Koor, and Toxic.

Each member designed their own style for arming letters based on Rammellzee's theory of Gothic Futurism, which describes graffiti as the weaponization of letters in a battle to reclaim language from a "diseased culture" of social control.

In the early 1980s, they were among the graffiti artists bringing original art and music from the Bronx and Queens to the downtown art scene. In 1982, A-One, Toxic, and Kool Koor participated in the group show Camouflaged Panzerism at Fashion Moda in South Bronx.

A-One was a friend and collaborator of artist Jean-Michel Basquiat. Basquiat became his mentor and taught him how get involved with art galleries. A-One is the subject of Basquiat's paintings Portrait of A-One A.K.A. King (1982), which sold for $11.5 million in 2020, and Anthony Clark (1985).

In 1983, A-One participated in the exhibit Jenny Holzer: Survival Series with A-One, Mike Glier, and Lady Pink at Lisson Gallery in London and the Post-Graffiti exhibit at Sidney Janis Gallery in New York.

In 1984, he participated in the group shows Arte di Frontiera: New York Graffiti in Italy, Classical American Graffiti Writers and High Graffiti Artists at Galerie Thomas in Munich, and Rapid Enamel: The Art of Graffiti at the University of Chicago.

A-One became the youngest artist to participate in the Venice Biennale in 1984. His work was featured in the exhibition Writing the Future: Basquiat and the Hip-Hop Generation at the Museum of Fine Arts, Boston from October 2020 to July 2021.

A-One also had numerous solo exhibitions: Galeria Salvatore Ala, Milan, Italy in 1983; Piccolo Museum in Lecce, Italy in 1985; and Galerie Quintessens, in Utrecht, the Netherlands in 1990; Galleria Salvatore + Caroline Ala in Milan, Italy in 2010.

For some time, he lived in Verona, Italy. He later moved to Paris, where he continued to work until his death from a brain hemorrhage at the age of 37 on November 11, 2001. He is survived by his older brother Octavius "Ocky" Clark, a 1991 Pan American Games gold medalist.
