= Oldenlandia balfourii =

Conservation status
- Least Concern (IUCN 3.1)

Scientific classification
- Kingdom: Plantae
- Clade: Tracheophytes
- Clade: Angiosperms
- Clade: Eudicots
- Clade: Asterids
- Order: Gentianales
- Family: Rubiaceae
- Genus: Oldenlandia
- Species: O. balfourii

Binomial name
- Oldenlandia balfourii Bremek. (1952)

Synonyms
- Hedyotis stellarioides Balf.f. (1882)

Species of plant

Oldenlandia balfourii is a species of plant in the family Rubiaceae. It is a subshrub endemic to the island of Socotra in Yemen. It grows in semi-deciduous woodland from 350 to 1,370 metres elevation.

This species has no close allies within the genus, and is placed in the monotypic subgenus Alsinastrum Bremek..
