= Oldenlandia bicornuta =

Conservation status
- Least Concern (IUCN 3.1)

Scientific classification
- Kingdom: Plantae
- Clade: Tracheophytes
- Clade: Angiosperms
- Clade: Eudicots
- Clade: Asterids
- Order: Gentianales
- Family: Rubiaceae
- Genus: Oldenlandia
- Species: O. bicornuta

Binomial name
- Oldenlandia bicornuta (Balf.f.) Bremek. (1952)

Synonyms
- Hedyotis bicornuta Balf.f. (1884)

Species of plant

Oldenlandia bicornuta is a species of plant in the family Rubiaceae. It is a rosette-forming annual subshrub endemic to the island of Socotra in Yemen. Its fruit have a distinctive pair of triangular terminal teeth. It grows in rocky areas on limestone plateaus from 450 to 1,000 meters elevation.
