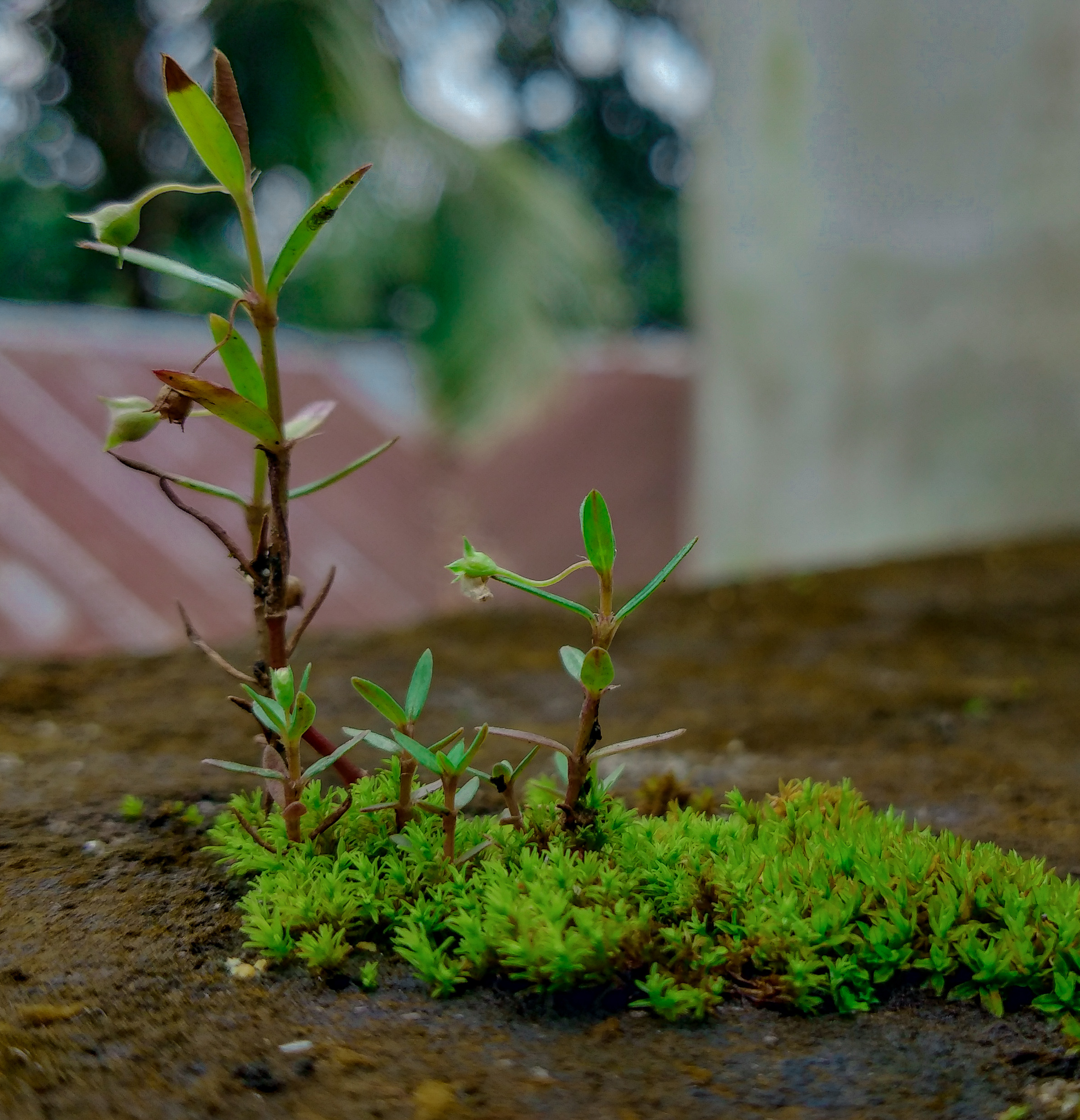
- Photograph of Oldenlandia corymbosa with moss

Scientific classification
- Kingdom: Plantae
- Clade: Tracheophytes
- Clade: Angiosperms
- Clade: Eudicots
- Clade: Asterids
- Order: Gentianales
- Family: Rubiaceae
- Genus: Oldenlandia
- Species: O. corymbosa

Binomial name
- Oldenlandia corymbosa L.

= Oldenlandia corymbosa =

Species of plant

Oldenlandia corymbosa, commonly known as flat-top mille graines or diamond flower, is a species of plant in the family Rubiaceae. It is a commonly used herb in China and India for treating sore eyes, anthelmintic, antirheumatic, depurative, digestive, diuretic, pectoral, fever, jaundice, child birth, and stomachic medicine, while the roots are reported to have vermifuge properties.

== Description ==
It is an annual herb with ascending or erect stems which are 4-angled. Its genome size is 273.7 megabase pairs.

The leaves of O. corymbosa are oppositely arranged and can be sessile or subsessile (Sessility (botany)). They are elliptic to linear-elliptic in shape, with the largest ranging in length from 1.5 to 2.5 centimeters (0.6 to 1 inch) and 4 to 7 millimeters (0.15 to 0.3 inches) in width. Seeds are brown and 0.2 millimeters long.

== Gallery ==
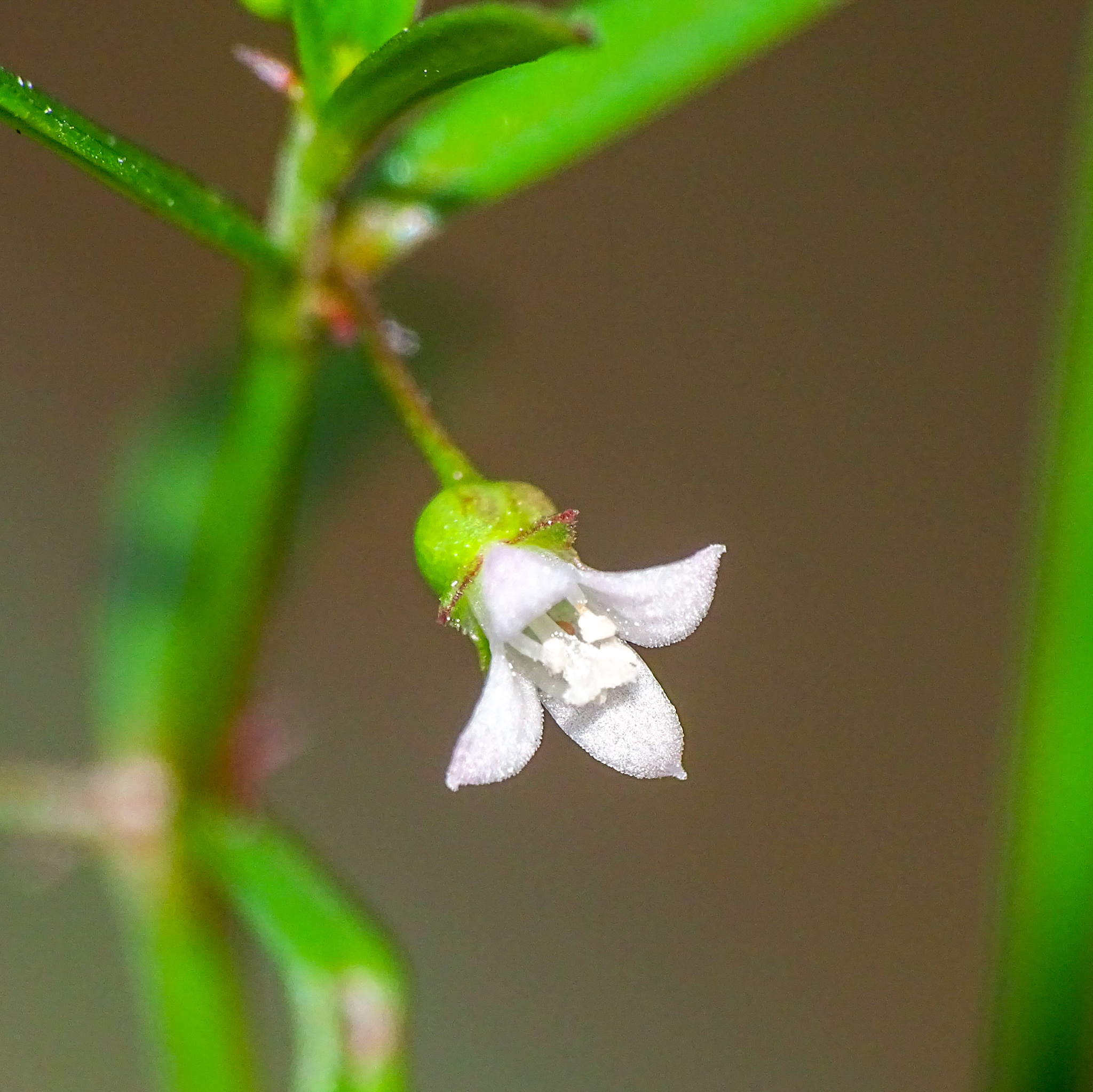
Flower of Oldenlandia corymbosa

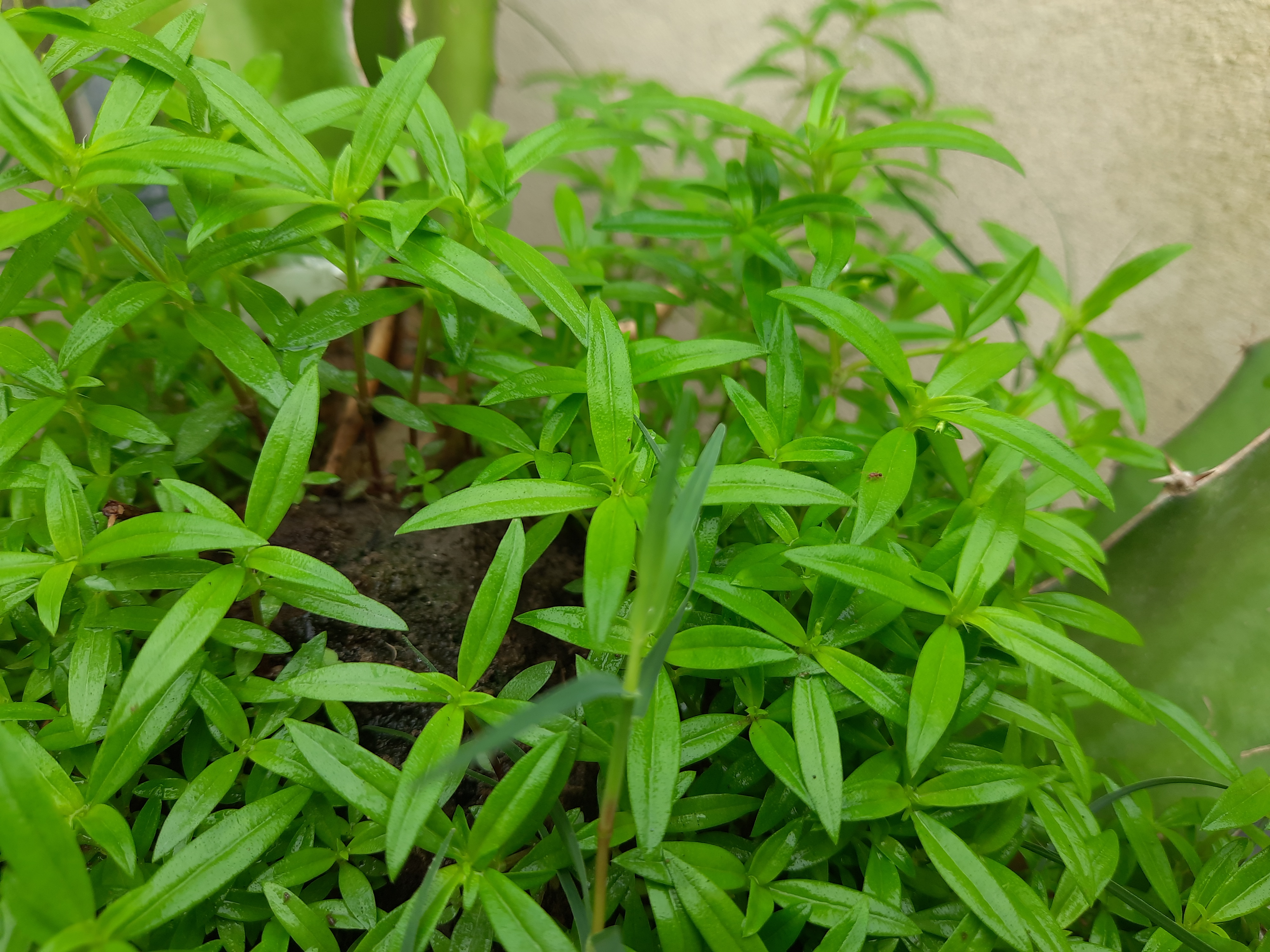
New born Oldenlandia corymbosa

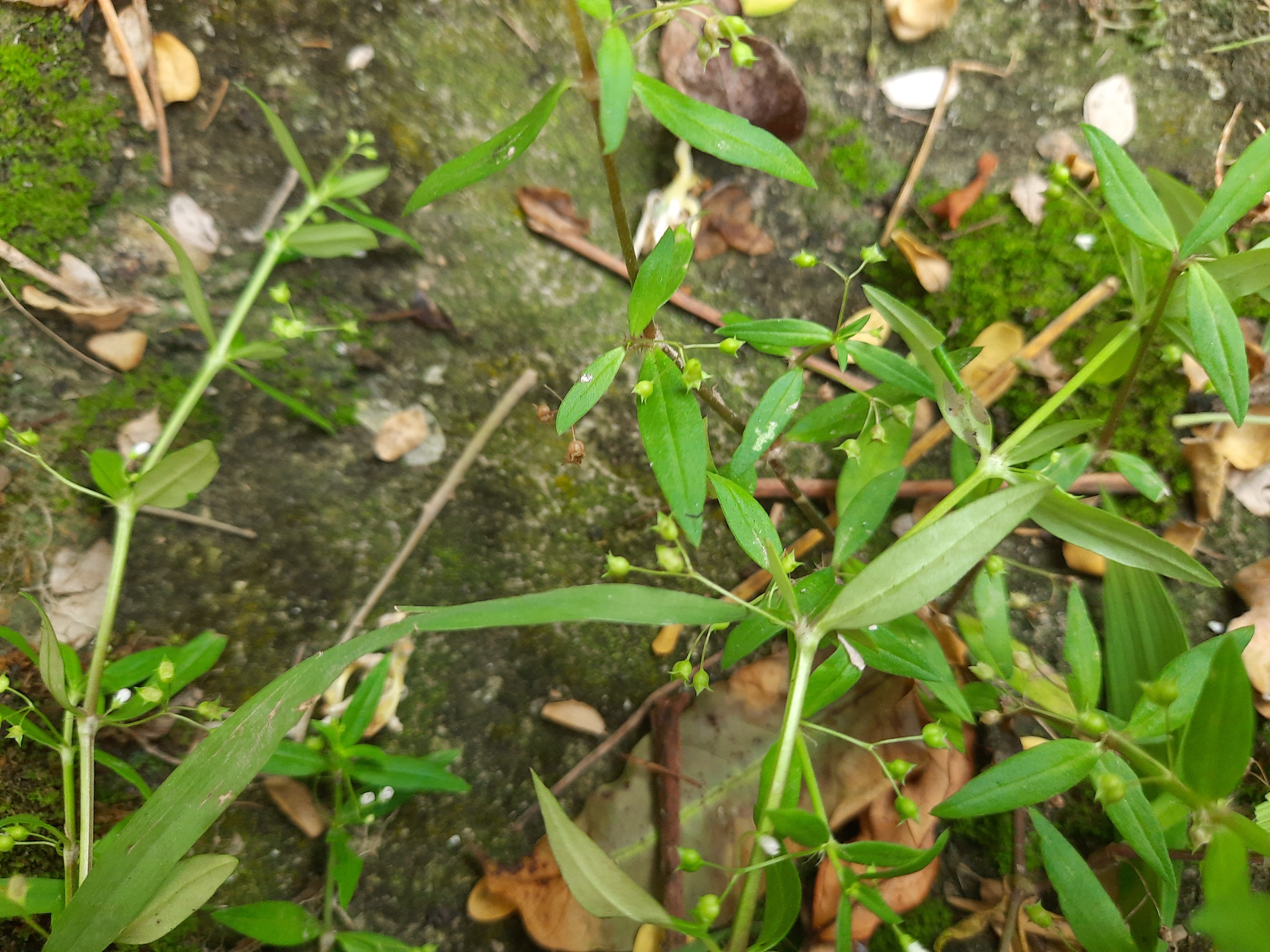
Seeds of Oldenlandia corymbosa
