= Oldenlandia ocellata =

Conservation status
- Vulnerable (IUCN 3.1)

Scientific classification
- Kingdom: Plantae
- Clade: Tracheophytes
- Clade: Angiosperms
- Clade: Eudicots
- Clade: Asterids
- Order: Gentianales
- Family: Rubiaceae
- Genus: Oldenlandia
- Species: O. ocellata

Binomial name
- Oldenlandia ocellata Bremek. (1952)

Species of plant

Oldenlandia ocellata is a species of plant in the family Rubiaceae. It is a rosette-forming subshrub endemic to the island of Abd al Kuri in Yemen's Socotra Archipelago. It has a distinctive clear eye at the tip of its succulent leaves and calyces, which may act as a lens to focus sun rays on photosynthetic cells around the sides of its semi-globose leaf tips. It grows on shaded rocky slopes and ledges from 30 to 500 metres elevation, and is particularly common in limestone cracks on Jebal Saleh. O. ocellata is in the "vulnerable" category of the IUCN Red List.
