= Coca Crystal =

American Underground personality (1947–2016)

- Born: Jacqueline Diamond; December 21, 1947; Manhattan, New York, U.S
- Died: March 1, 2016 (aged 68); Rochelle Park, New Jersey, U.S
- Occupation: Television personality
- Parent(s): Jack Diamond; Rita Dunn

Coca Crystal (December 21, 1947 – March 1, 2016) was an American television personality, anarchist and political activist, connected with 1960s counterculture. She was best known for her weekly cable-access variety show The Coca Crystal Show: If I Can't Dance, You Can Keep Your Revolution, which ran from 1977 to 1995 on Manhattan Cable Television.

== Biography ==
Born as Jacqueline Diamond on December 21, 1947, to Jack Diamond, owner of J. Diamond Furs and Rita Dunn, a former fur model. She was born in Manhattan and raised in Mamaroneck.

Starting in 1969, she was a contributor to the East Village Other (EVO) and the name Coca Crystal was created as her pen name. She would write about politics, women's issues and personal events, many of which earned her the title "slumgoddess".

In 1975 she adopted her sister's mentally and physically handicapped son, Gustav Che Finkelstein, after her sister was arrested and imprisoned for possession of Hashish in Morocco. Gus received an “executive producer" credit and his babysitter was interviewed on her show. She cared for Gus up until her death.

Her cable-access, weekly variety show television show The Coca Crystal Show: If I Can't Dance, You Can Keep Your Revolution would always start out with lighting a joint, oftentimes she would be pulling the joint from a flower pot and then smoking it. She would talk about protests, anti-nuke activism, local and world news with special segment called Newborn News and invite a wide variety of guests. Some guests on her show included: Philip Glass, Debbie Harry, Abbie Hoffman, Judith Malina, Cesar Chavez, Dana Beal, Tiny Tim, and Tuli Kupferberg of the Fugs. One of her frequent guests, Glenn O'Brien went on to host his own long running public-access television show, TV Party after he appeared on Coca's show.

In April 1977, a woman claiming to be Crystal called the New York Times to claim the pieing of conservative activist and author Phyllis Schlafly on behalf of the Emma Goldman Brigade. Schlafly was attending a Women's National Republican Club event thrown in her honor at the landmark Waldorf Astoria New York.

In 2013, a play written, via interview with Coca Crystal and titled If I Can't Dance You Can Keep Your Revolution: The Coca Crystal Story was performed by Danielle Quisenberry. The play was shown at Emerging Artists Theatre, TADA! Theater, and part of the East Village Theater Festival at Metropolitan Playhouse in New York City.

Crystal died of respiratory failure on March 1, 2016, in Rochelle Park, New Jersey, at age 68. In 2006 she was diagnosed with lung cancer and had struggled with many treatments prior to her death.

== See also ==
- TV Party
- The Poetry Project's Public Access Poetry
- Potato Wolf TV by Collaborative Projects (COLAB)
- Jamie Davidovich's The Live! Show (1979–1984)
