= Judith Henry (artist) =

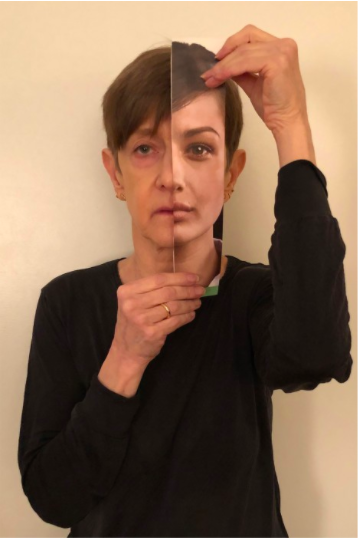
- Beauty Masks, 2020
- Born: 1942 (age 83–84); Cleveland, Ohio U.S.
- Education: Carnegie-Mellon University
- Occupation: Visual artist
- Children: 2

Judith Henry (born 1942) is a New York-based artist who creates multimedia art works exploring interior versus public self. Henry often uses newspapers, telephone books, and film reels. She also uses snapshot photography. After graduating from college, she moved to New York and married artist Jaime Davidovich, with whom she has two daughters. She currently lives in Williamsburg, Brooklyn.

== Early life and education ==
Henry received a Bachelor of Fine Arts from Carnegie-Mellon University in 1964.

== Career ==
Pages of Freud (1971), Henry crosshatches lines onto page after page of Freud's writings, signaling her persistent doubts about the therapeutic potential of language. She continues mining this vein in both Telephone Book Series (1973) and Male and Female (1982, 2009).

Henry designed Crumpled Paper Stationery as part of Wooster Enterprises (1976–79), a collaborative, conceptual business she began with artist Jaime Davidovich. Using their own original designs and additional prototypes by George Maciunas, Davidovich and Henry sold small paper products—greeting cards, writing pads, confetti, and other paper goods—to large and small stores throughout the United States. Their intent was to bring conceptual art into a truly commercial arena. After Wooster Enterprises failed, The Museum of Modern Art continued to produce Henry's crumpled paper stationery. For years, it was one of the Museum store's best selling items.

=== Awards ===
- 2022 Pollock-Krasner Foundation Grant

=== Books ===
- 2020 "Beauty Masks", published essay by Grace Graupe-Pillard
- 2006 "Overheard in America", Atria Books
- 2002 "Overheard on the Way to MOMAQueens"
- 2001 "Overheard in Love", Universe Publishers
- 2001 "Overheard While Shopping", Universe Publishers
- 2001 "Overheard at the Bookstore", Universe Publishers
- 2000 "Overheard at the Museum", Universe Publishers

=== Exhibitions ===
- 2023 Catskill Art Space, Livingston, NY
- 2021 Davis Orton Gallery, Hudson, NY
- 2018 Casting Call, January, BravinLee Programs, New York, NY
- 2017 Alternate Lives, Judith Henry and Morton Bartlett, National Arts Club, New York, NY
- 2016 Me as Her, Visual Arts Center of New Jersey, NJ
- 2015 Solo exhibition, BravinLee Programs, New York, NY
- 2014 Women Choose Women Again, Visual Arts center of New Jersey, Summit, NJ
- 2012 Davis Orton Gallery, Hudson, NY
- 2012 Churner and Churner
- 2011 0.00156 acres Gallery, September, Brooklyn
- 2010 National Academy Invitational Exhibition, New York
- 2008 Festival de Cine International de Barcelona, Berta Bornstein
- 2008 San Francisco Short Film Festival, Berta Bornstein
- 2008 Technocracy, Carnegie Mellon University, Regina Gouger Miller Gallery, The Southern Express, Pittsburgh, PA
- 2008 Philadelphia Independent Film Festival, Berta Bornstein
- 2008 Ace Film Festival, The Southern Express, New York, NY
- 2005 Artsumer Gallery, Statement in the Art, Istanbul, Turkey
- 2003 Reading Between the Lines, 147 Wooster Arts Space, New York, NY
- 2002 Barbara Kraków Gallery, Boston, MA
- 2001 Emily Davis Gallery, University of Akron, Akron, OH
- 1996 25th Year Retrospective, Douglass College, New Brunswick, NJ
- 1996 Tartessos Gallery, Barcelona, Spain
- 1992 Bound & Unbound, New York, NY
- 1989 Graphic Design in America, Walker Art Center, Minneapolis, MN
- 1988 Alternating Currents, Alternative Museum, New York, NY
- 1986 White Columns Presents Video, White Columns, New York, NY
- 1985 Video Festival, A.I.R. Gallery
- 1984 Between Here and Nowhere, Riverside Gallery, London, England
- 1984 White Columns, New York, NY
- 1981 Centre de Documentacio d’Art Actual, Barcelona, Spain
- 1980 Two Plus Gallery, Denver, CO
- 1978 Douglass College, Rutgers University, New Brunswick, New Jersey
- 1978 Carnegie-Mellon Alumni Exhibition, New York, NY
- 1978 A.I.R. Gallery, New York, NY
- 1977 All-Ohio Painting and Sculpture, Dayton Art Institute, Dayton, OH
- 1977 Hundred Acres Gallery Archived 2011-03-16 at the Wayback Machine, New York, NY, solo exhibition
- 1976 New Gallery, Cleveland, OH
- 1976 John Carroll University, Cleveland, OH

=== Installations ===
- 2011 Who I saw in NY 1970-2000 0.00156 acres Gallery, New York, NY
- 2003 Walking and Talking, Wooster Arts Space, New York, NY
- 2001 Her Personality Makes Her Prettier, Ricco Maresca Gallery, New York, NY
- 2001 Overheard in Los Angeles, Neiman Marcus, window and store installation, Los Angeles, CA
- 2000 Overheard in New York, Bergdorf Goodman window installation, NY

=== Profiles and interviews ===
- 2017 Hyperallergic, ArtRX NYC by Hrag Vartanian
- 2015 1stdibs “Introspective”, Carol Kino, Introspective Magazine
- 2012 September 17, Huffpost Arts & Culture
- 2012 August 10, The New York Times, “Wooster Enterprises”, Holland Cotter
- 2012 August 1, The Village Voice, Robert Shuster, “Wooster Enterprises”, New York
- 2012 July, Artslant, Carmen Winant, New York
- 2012 The Wild, Serena Qiu, blog magazine, The Visionaries Issue
- 2009 Winter, Unsuspecting on the A-train, Working Class Magazine
- 2006 December, Samantha Grice, National Post, Canada
- 2002 May, interview with Jeanne Moos, CNN
- 2001 July 25, segment on KTLA television, Los Angeles, Gail Anderson
- 2001 April, profile on Gotham TV, produced by Michael Pearlman and Elizabeth Curtin
- 2001 February, Rob Perree, Kunstbeeld, Amsterdam
- 2001 January 30, Edward Nawotka, Publishers Weekly
- 2000 October 1, interview by Joe Torres, American Broadcasting Company|ABC Eyewitness News
- 2000 September, Hannah Wallace, ARTnews
- 2000 August 7, Bill Bell, The Daily News (New York)|Daily News, "Drop Her a Line Anytime]"
- 2000 May, interview on MetroGuide TV with Robert Verdi
- The New York Times, Playing in the Neighborhood]
