= Oldenlandia pulvinata =

Conservation status
- Least Concern (IUCN 3.1)

Scientific classification
- Kingdom: Plantae
- Clade: Tracheophytes
- Clade: Angiosperms
- Clade: Eudicots
- Clade: Asterids
- Order: Gentianales
- Family: Rubiaceae
- Genus: Oldenlandia
- Species: O. pulvinata

Binomial name
- Oldenlandia pulvinata (Balf.f.) Vierh. (1907)

Synonyms
- Hedyotis pulvinata Balf.f. (1884); Oldenlandia pulvinata f. congesta Vierh. (1907); Oldenlandia pulvinata f. laxa Vierh. (1907)

Species of plant

Oldenlandia pulvinata is a species of plant in the family Rubiaceae. It is a cushion-forming subshrub endemic to the islands of Socotra, Abd al Kuri, and Samhah in Yemen's Socotra Archipelago. It is widespread in shrubland and in rocky areas on plains and limestone plateaus from sea level to 800 metres elevation.
