= Rammellzee =

American rapper

RAMM:ΣLL:ZΣΣ
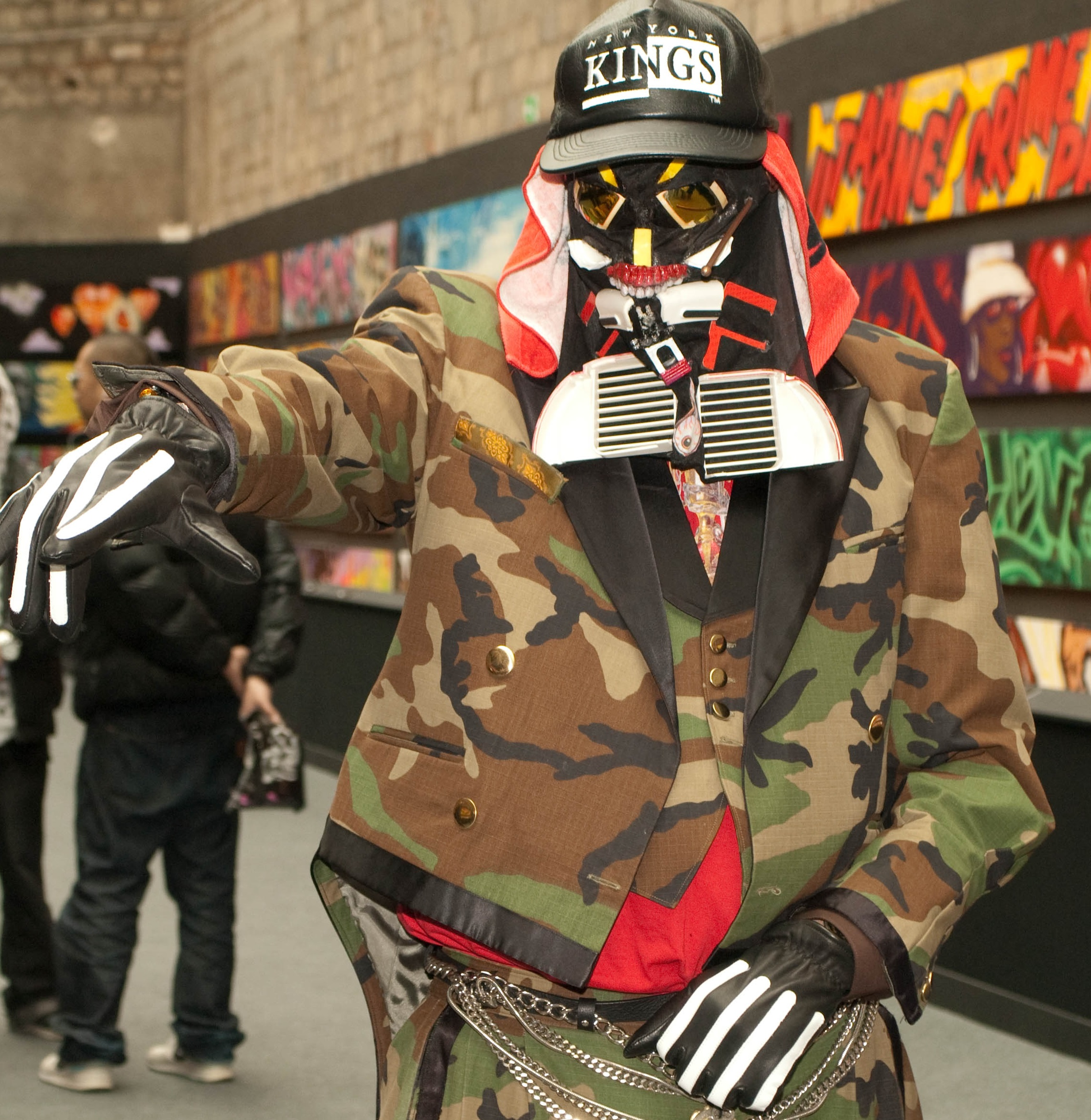
- Rammellzee at an exhibition in the Grand Palais in Paris, 2009
- Born: December 15, 1960; Far Rockaway, Queens, New York City, New York
- Died: June 28, 2010 (aged 49); New York City, New York
- Other names: Ramm, Hyte, Hytestyr, EG (Evolution Griller The Master Killer), Sharissk Boo, Razz
- Occupations: Visual art Graffiti; Performance art Sculptor; Hip hop musician
- Years active: Late 1970s–2010
- Known for: Gothic Futurism; Afrofuturism
- Spouse: Carmela Zagari Rammellzee

Tag

Rammellzee (stylized RAMM:ΣLL:ZΣΣ, pronounced /ɹæm.ɛl.zi/ "Ram: Ell: Zee"; December 15, 1960 – June 28, 2010) was a visual artist, gothic futurist graffiti writer, painter, performance artist, art theoretician, sculptor and a hip-hop musician from New York City, who has been cited as "instrumental in introducing elements of the avant-garde into hip-hop culture".

== Early life ==
Rammellzee was born on December 15, 1960, in Far Rockaway, Queens to an African-American mother and Italian father who worked as a transit detective. He grew up in the Carlton Manor Projects near the Far Rockaway–Mott Avenue A train terminal station. His graffiti work started to show up in the 1970s on New York City's subway cars and stations, specifically on the A-train since it was his local train.

Rammellzee studied dentistry at the Clara Barton High School for Health Professions, was a model for Wilhelmina (under the name Mcrammellzee), and briefly studied jewelry design at the Fashion Institute of Technology (FIT).

== Career ==
Discovered by a larger audience through the 1982 cult movie Wild Style by Charlie Ahearn, Rammellzee's earlier fame in graffiti circles was established when he painted New York subway trains with DONDI, OU3, and Ink 76, and doctor Revolt under his aliases Hyte, Hytestyr, EG (Evolution Griller the Master Killer), Sharissk Boo, Razz, and Maestro on the A, CC, 2 and 5 subway lines.

Rammellzee was an occasional member of the Death Comet Crew, with Stuart Argabright, Michael Diekmann and Shinichi Shimokawa. He also formed the crew Tag Master Killers, consisting of A-One, Delta2, Kool Koor and Toxic. Rammellzee's influence can be heard in artists such as Beastie Boys and Cypress Hill.

Rammellzee became a friend and collaborator of artist Jean-Michel Basquiat. In 1982, Rammellzee and Toxic accompanied Basquiat to Los Angeles while he prepared for his show at the Gagosian Gallery. They called themselves the Hollywood Africans as a social and political statement to counter the stereotypical portrayals of African Americans in Hollywood.

The trio are depicted in Basquiat's paintings Hollywood Africans in front of the Chinese Theater with Footprints of Movie Stars (1983) and Hollywood Africans (1983). Rammellzee was an original hip hop artist who introduced specific vocal styles which date back to the early 1980s.

Original pressings of Rammellzee’s 12-inch single "Beat Bop", in collaboration with rapper K-Rob and with cover art by Basquiat, is sometimes regarded as one of the most collectible early rap records. "Beat Bop" was also featured in the film Style Wars.

Rammellzee made a cameo appearance near the end of Jim Jarmusch's 1984 film Stranger Than Paradise.

In 1988, Rammellzee and his band Gettovetts recorded the album Missionaries Moving, with producer Bill Laswell, a frequent collaborator. Laswell also paired Rammellzee with writer William Burroughs on the 1989 album Seven Souls, and featured him on several albums recorded by his revolving super-group, Praxis.

Rammellzee wrote an opera titled The Requiem of Gothic Futurism in 1985 and "offered to send the U.S. military some of the intelligence he had gathered for national defense." He also "tried to promote his ideas by producing a comic book and a board game and was the first artist to collaborate with the street wear brand Supreme, making hand-painted trucker hats at their first store in 1994.

In 2003, Rammellzee released his debut album, This Is What You Made Me, and performed at the Knitting Factory in New York with the newly reformed Death Comet Crew. Subsequently, Troubleman Unlimited re-released recordings made by DCC between 1982 and 1984.

Their single for Exterior St was featured on the compilation Anti-NY with Ike Yard, Sexual Harassment, and Vivien Goldman, among others. In 2004, Rammellzee released his second album Bi-Conicals of the Rammellzee, produced by Gamma Records.

In 2009 Rammellzee exhibited what was to be his final work, Atomic Note Maestro Atmosferic, at an exhibition housed in the Grand Palais in Paris.

In 2018, Rammellzee was the subject of a retrospective exhibition at Red Bull Arts in New York City head-curated by Maxwell Wolf.

In 2024 Rizzoli Electa published the 384-page book RAMM:ΣLL:ZΣΣ : Racing for Thunder that was edited by Maxwell Wolf and Jeff Mao.

A 2025 exhibit titled ALPHABETA SIGMA (Side A) was shown at the Palais de Tokyo in Paris. As the first "side" of a double-sided series of exhibitions inspired by the two sides of a cassette tape or vinyl record, this Side A "focuses primarily on the materials that make up the artist’s work (writing, paint, spray, resin, black light and textiles), as well as his founding motifs (the letter, the arrow and the mask), which enabled the artist to turn ornament into armament". Part of the exhibit includes "Relics" he created including "jewelry, figures, masks, and other accessories". Never previously seen, these objects include a set of "crown bracelets" found by his wife in a warehouse which had not been previously seen by the public. One relic is a gun-like weapon composed of various objects including a Casio SK-1 sampling keyboard and a Boss Corporation guitar effect pedal.

Side B of ALPHABETA SIGMA will be shown at the CAPC musée d'art contemporain de Bordeaux in Bordeaux. This second half of the exhibit "intends to establish a constellation of influences and friendships around the practice of RAMMELLZEE (considered as featurings), whose work will be presented through a more condensed selection of works, to better highlight its particularity and situate it in the history of historical and contemporary artistic production".

The Rammellzee estate is represented by the Jeffrey Deitch Gallery.

== Artistry ==
=== Gothic Futurism ===
Rammellzee's graffiti and art work are based on his theory of "Gothic Futurism", which describes the battle between letters and their symbolic warfare against any standardizations enforced by the rules of the alphabet.

His treatise, Ionic treatise Gothic Futurism assassin knowledges of the remanipulated square point's one to 720° to 1440°, details an anarchic plan by which to revise the role and deployment of language in society. Rammellzee performed in self-designed masks and costumes of different characters which represented the "mathematical equation" that is Rammellzee.

On the basis of his Gothic Futurism approach, he described his artistic work as the logical extension into a new phase which he calls Ikonoklast Panzerism. This artistic work has been shown in art galleries throughout the US and Europe. His Letter Racers, and other Noise includes artistic works by individuals mostly identified with their musical contributions.

=== Afrofuturism ===
Rammellzee's work is considered to contribute to the canon of Afrofuturism, primarily through his repeated use of language as a technology. One of the central themes of Afrofuturist content is the use of language as a technology to transcend the Digital Divide. Conversely, Rammellzee had stated that "there is no such thing as Afro Futurism" and considered his work to be more part of a larger European monastic tradition than any part of an Afrofuturist tradition.

The theory of Gothic Futurism attempts to deconstruct the English language as it is currently conceived. The battle between letters seen in the Ionic treatise deploys language as a technology to fight the oppressive nature of the alphabet. The introduction of a new mythology in the treatise suggests that Rammellzee's language can serve as a force of liberation, thereby lessening the Digital Divide.

In addition, Rammellzee's Letter Racers are intended to pit each individual letter in galactic battles against each other, symbolically challenging the accepted standards and functionality of the 26-letter alphabet.

Rammellzee's description of the Letter Racers is as follows:

Humans ... in the 14th Century the monks ornamented and illustrated the manuscripts of letters. In the 21st and 22nd century the letters of the alphabet through competition are now armamented for letter racing and galactic battles. This was made possible by a secret equation known as THE RAMM:ELL:ZEE.

Rammellzee is celebrated in Big Audio Dynamite's song, "C'mon Every Beatbox".

== Personal life ==
Rammellzee was married to Carmela Zagari Rammellzee. He died in New York City on June 28, 2010, at the age of 49. The official cause of death was listed as heart disease. He also had liver problems, and health issues caused or exacerbated by exposure to glue, paint fumes, resin and other toxic substances used in his works.

Rammellzee was a member of the Five-Percent Nation.

=== Name ===
He legally changed his name to Rammellzee in 1979 and friends who knew his birth name were unwilling to reveal it, in accordance with his wishes. He sometimes went by the shortened name of "Ramm". He has stated that his name is derived from RAM plus M for "magnitude", sigma (Σ) as the first summation operator, two Ls for "longitude" and "latitude" respectively, Z for "z-bar", and finally two more sigmas to represent summation. He has credited Jamel-Z, a mentor from the Nation of Gods and Earths he met in 1977, with inspiration for his name.

=== Battlestation ===
Rammellzee's live/work loft studio space on 46 Laight Street in the Tribeca neighborhood, which he shared with his wife Carmela, was named "Battlestation". It was a popular place in the 1980s and 1990s for artists to visit, because Rammellzee's artwork and costumes created a unique atmosphere. After the September 11 attacks, the building was sold in order to build luxury condos and this forced Rammellzzee and Carmela to move to a smaller place in Battery Park City, and relocate his 20 years worth of artwork into a storage unit. Some of this stored work was included in the 2011 art exhibition, Art in the Streets at Museum of Contemporary Art Los Angeles. In May 2018, Red Bull Arts New York opened its exhibition RAMMΣLLZΣΣ: Racing for Thunder, in collaboration with architect firm studioSTIGSGAARD.

== Collections ==
Rammellzee's work is held in the following public collection:

- Museum of Modern Art, New York: one 12-inch vinyl record ("Beat Bop") and a series of ten drawings titled Alphabet, undated
- Museum of Graffiti, Miami

== Discography ==
Studio albums

Year	Album title	Artist(s)	Notes
2003	This Is What You Made Me	Rammellzee	
2004	Bi-Conicals of the Rammellzee	Rammellzee	

Singles & EPs

Year	Song title	Artist(s)	Notes
1983	"Beat Bop"	Rammellzee vs. K-Rob	
1984	"Crazy Sneaker"	Slinky Gym School featuring Rammellzee	
1985	"At The Marble Bar"	Death Comet Crew featuring Rammellzee	
1987	"Death Command"	Rammellzee with Shockdell	
1988	"Gangster Lean"	Gettovetts featuring Rammellzee	
1989	"Equation"	Material featuring Rammellzee on vocals	On the album Seven Souls
1995	"Tales From The Rails"	Lordz of Brooklyn featuring Rammellzee	On the album All in the Family
2003	"Cheesy Lipstick"	Rammellzee	(7")
2004	"Pay The Rent"	Rammellzee	(12")
2005	"This Is (Re)Phop"	Death Comet Crew Featuring The Rammellzee	
2005	"Service Of Arms"	Rammellzee	(CD Single, Limited Edition DVD)
2015	"Brainstorm"	Rammellzee	(12") (2015 Gamma Proforma)
2015	"How's My Girlfriends"	Rammellzee	(12") (2015 Gamma Proforma)
2015	"Crayzay"	Rammellzee	(12") (2015 Gamma Proforma)
2015	"Fight My Fire"	Rammellzee	(12") (2015 Gamma Proforma)
