= Braquenié et Cie =

French fabric designer and manufacturer

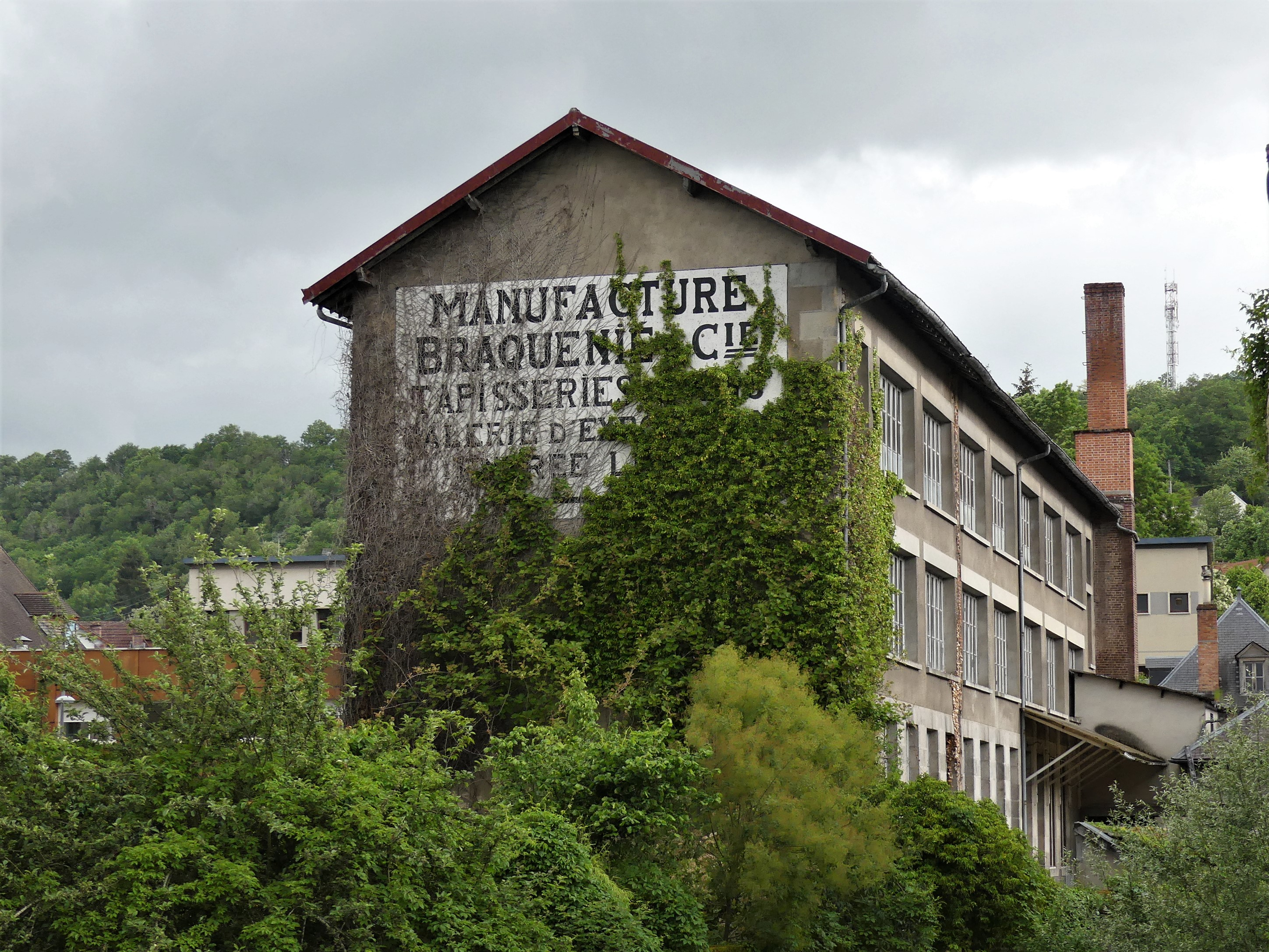
The main building of the former textile manufacturer Braquenié et Cie, at Aubusson, Creuse, France.

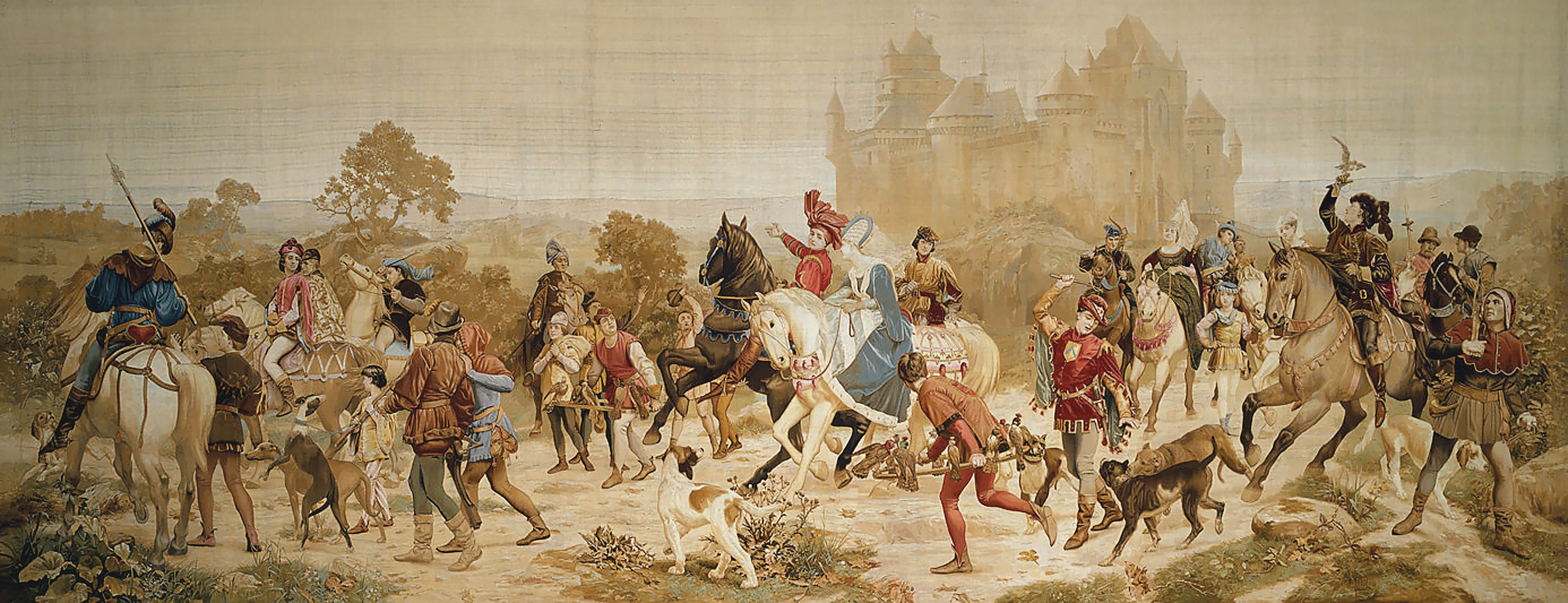
Le Depart de la Chasse au Faucon by Brauenié et Cie, after Louis-Marie Baader. Circa 1880–1885

Braquenié et Cie was a French fabric designer and manufacturer. The company was founded in 1823.

== History ==
The company was founded in 1823 by Pierre-Antoine Doineau and his wife Louise-Desirée Doineau. Around 1840 the company opened a factory at Aubusson, France. In 1842 the company renamed itself Demy-Doineau et Braquenié, Manufacture Royale de Tapis et de Tapisserie. Two years later, Demy-Doineau et Braquenié exhibited at the French Industrial Exposition of 1844 in Paris.

In 1858 the brothers Alexandre and Charles-Henri Braquenié took over the company, renaming it Braquenié frères; In 1873 this was changed to Braquenié et Cie. In 1898 the company purchased land and a former fabric factory in Felletin, France.

Its clients included the Kings Louis-Philippe, Napoléon III and his wife Eugénie, the family Rothschild and the Vatican.

Examples of their work are included in the collections of the Metropolitan Museum of Art, New York and the National Gallery of Art, Washington.

== Closure ==
The factory at Felletin closed in 1958 or 1959. Its factories at Malines and d'Aubusson closed in 1987 and 1990, respectively. In 1991 the company and its designs were acquired by Pierre Frey.
