= K-Rob =

American rapper

- Born: Malik Johnson
- Genres: Hip-hop
- Occupation: Rapper
- Label: Profile

Malik Johnson, better known as K-Rob, is an American rapper most famous for providing vocals for "Beat Bop" with Rammellzee in 1983. He was also a graffiti artist with the tag "Crane." He released the singles "I'm a Homeboy" and "The Day K-Rob Came Back" under his own name, in 1986. Since the 1980s, however, aside from providing a verse for "Beat Bop Part 2" on 2004's Bi-Conicals of the Rammellzee, K-Rob has devoted himself more to his Muslim faith.
