= Toxic (graffiti artist) =

American graffiti artist

Torrick Ablack (born 16 January 1965), also known as Toxic, is an American artist who was part of the graffiti movement of the early 1980s in New York City. He transitioned from street art to exhibiting his paintings in galleries and museums internationally.

== Life and career ==
Ablack was born in Bronx, New York on 16 January 1965. His mother was Puerto Rican and his father's family came from Trinidad. In his youth he was given the nickname Toxic Battery, which became his graffiti tag. He began painting graffiti at the age of 13 with A-One and Kool Koor. They joined Rammellzee's graffiti crew Tag Master Killers, which also consisted of Delta2. Each member designed their own style for arming letters based on Rammellzee's theory of Gothic Futurism, which describes graffiti as the weaponization of letters in a battle to reclaim language from a "diseased culture" of social control. In the early 1980s, they were among the graffiti artists bringing original art and music from the Bronx and Queens to the downtown art scene. In 1982, Toxic, A-One, and Kool Koor participated in the group show Camouflaged Panzerism at Fashion Moda in the South Bronx.

Toxic met artist Jean-Michel Basquiat soon after the latter's exhibition at Annina Nosei Gallery in 1982. Basquiat became his mentor and hired him as an occasional studio assistant. Toxic and Rammellzee accompanied Basquiat to Los Angeles while he prepared for his 1983 show at the Gagosian Gallery. While in Los Angeles, where they were struck by how the film industry portrayed African Americans, especially during the Golden Age of Hollywood. In response, they dubbed themselves the Hollywood Africans as a social and political statement to counter the stereotypical portrayals of African Americans in Hollywood. The trio are depicted in Basquiat's paintings Hollywood Africans in front of the Chinese Theater with Footprints of Movie Stars (1983) and Hollywood Africans (1983).

Toxic stayed true to the graffiti spraying technique and worked on canvases pinned to the wall. His work became more abstract than the tags he wrote on subway cars. In 1984, Toxic participated in the group show Arte di Frontiera: New York Graffiti in Italy. He was part of the exhibit Rapid Enamel at the University of Chicago in 2014, which was the first showcasing of graffiti in an American institution. His artwork has since appeared in the collections of major museums, including the Brooklyn Museum, the Groninger Museum and the Museum of the City of New York. In 2013, he was featured in the exhibit Last of the Hollywood Africans: Toxic, Rammellzee and Jean-Michel Basquiat at Londonewcastle Project Space in London. In 2015, he was featured in the group exhibit Le Pressionnisme at Pinacothèque de Paris. That year, he participated in the exhibit Graffiti, New York meets the Dam at the Amsterdam Museum. In 2020, his painting, Ransom Note: CEE (1984), was included in the exhibit Writing the Future: Basquiat and the Hip-Hop Generation at the Museum of Fine Arts, Boston.

Toxic designed a wallpaper, a printed linen, and a wall panel in collaboration with French textile house Pierre Frey.

Toxic is based in France but spends his time between Paris, Florence, and New York.
