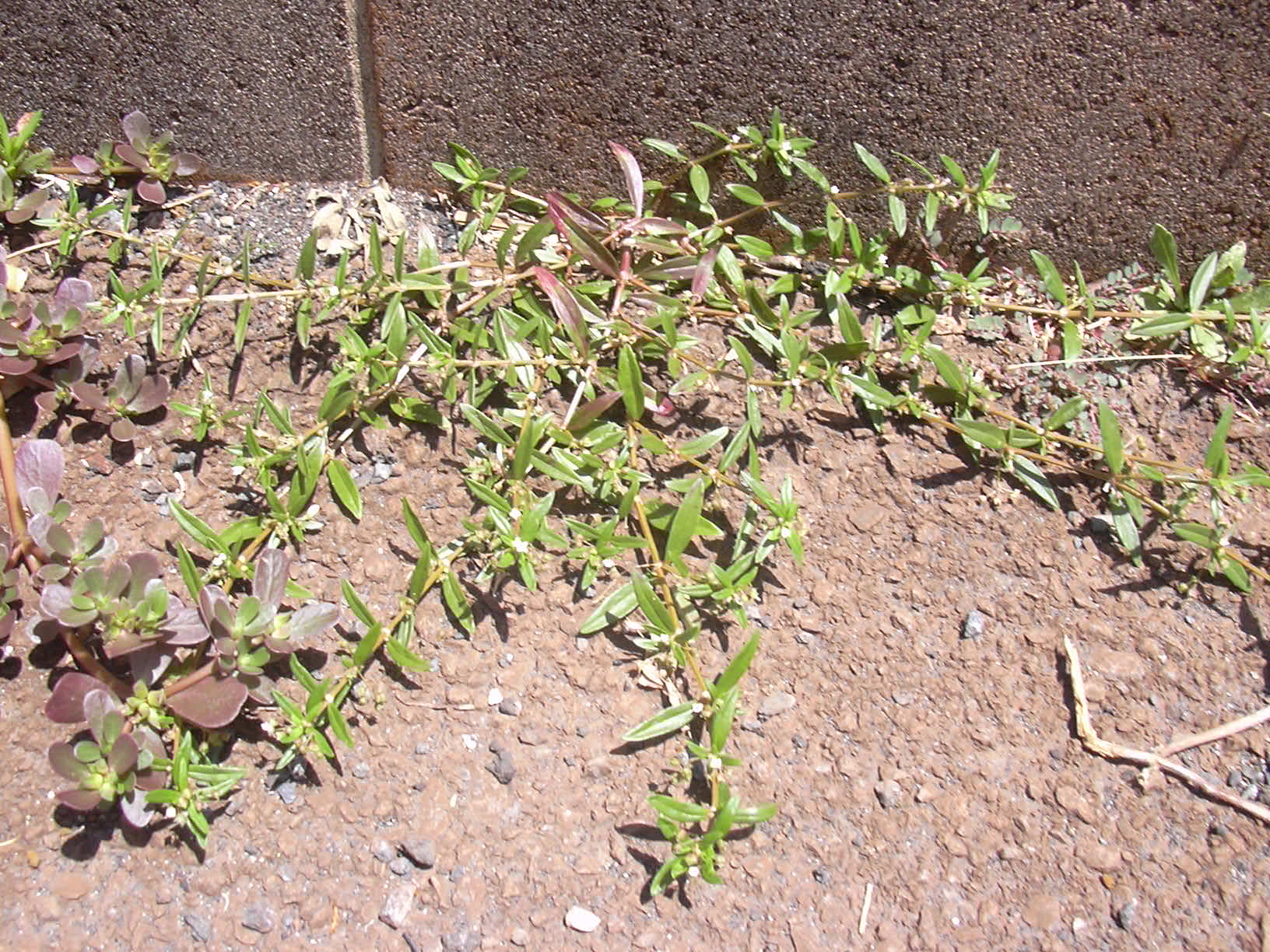
- Oldenlandia corymbosa

Scientific classification
- Kingdom: Plantae
- Clade: Tracheophytes
- Clade: Angiosperms
- Clade: Eudicots
- Clade: Asterids
- Order: Gentianales
- Family: Rubiaceae
- Subfamily: Rubioideae
- Tribe: Spermacoceae
- Genus: Oldenlandia; L. (1753)

Type species
- Oldenlandia corymbosa Linnaeus

Species
- Many, see text

Synonyms
- Cormylus Raf. (1820), nom. provis.; Dyctiospora Reinw. ex Korth. (1851); Eionitis Bremek. (1952); Gerontogea Cham. & Schltdl. (1829); Karamyschewia Fisch. & C.A.Mey. (1838); Listeria Neck. (1790), opus utique oppr.; Mitratheca K.Schum. (1903); Stelmanis Raf. (1840); Stelmotis Raf. (1838); Thecorchus Bremek. (1952); Theyodis A.Rich. (1848)

= Oldenlandia =

Genus of plants

Oldenlandia is a genus of flowering plants in the family Rubiaceae. It is pantropical in distribution and has about 240 species. The type species for the genus is Oldenlandia corymbosa.

Oldenlandia was named by Linnaeus in 1753 in Species Plantarum. The name honors the Danish botanist Henrik Bernard Oldenland (c. 1663 – 1697). Some species are important in ethnomedicine; a number (usually island endemics) are threatened species, with one species and one variety being completely extinct already.

Some botanists have not recognized Oldenlandia, but have placed some or all of its species in a broadly defined Hedyotis. More recently, the circumscription of Hedyotis has been narrowed to a monophyletic group of about 115 species and no longer includes Oldenlandia. The genus Oldenlandia, as presently defined, is several times polyphyletic and will eventually be reduced to a group of species closely related to the type species. This group, known informally as Oldenlandia sensu stricto, is sister to a section of Kohautia that will eventually be separated from Kohautia and named as a new genus.

== Selected species ==
164 species are accepted. Selected species include:

- Oldenlandia adscensionis (DC.) Cronk (extinct: 1889)
- Oldenlandia aegialodes Bremek.
- Oldenlandia affinis (Roem. & Schult.) DC.
- Oldenlandia albonervia (Beddome) Gamble
- Oldenlandia aretioides Vierh.
- Oldenlandia balfourii Bremek.
- Oldenlandia bicornuta (Balf.f.) Bremek.
- Oldenlandia cana Bremek.
- Oldenlandia capensis L.f.
- Oldenlandia cornata Craib
- Oldenlandia corymbosa L.
- Oldenlandia forcipistipula Verdc.
- Oldenlandia lanceolata Craib
- Oldenlandia microtheca (Cham. & Schltdl.) DC.
- Oldenlandia ocellata Bremek.
- Oldenlandia oxycoccoides Bremek.
- Oldenlandia patula Bremek.
- Oldenlandia pulvinata (Balf.f.) Vierh.
- Oldenlandia sieberi Baker
  - Oldenlandia sieberi var. congesta (Balf.f. ex Baker) Balf.f.
  - Oldenlandia sieberi var. sieberi (extinct)
- Oldenlandia umbellata L.
- Oldenlandia uvinsae Verdc.
- Oldenlandia vasudevanii Soumya & Maya

=== Formerly placed here ===
- Scleromitrion diffusum (Willd.) R.J.Wang (as Oldenlandia diffusa (Willd.) Roxb.)
