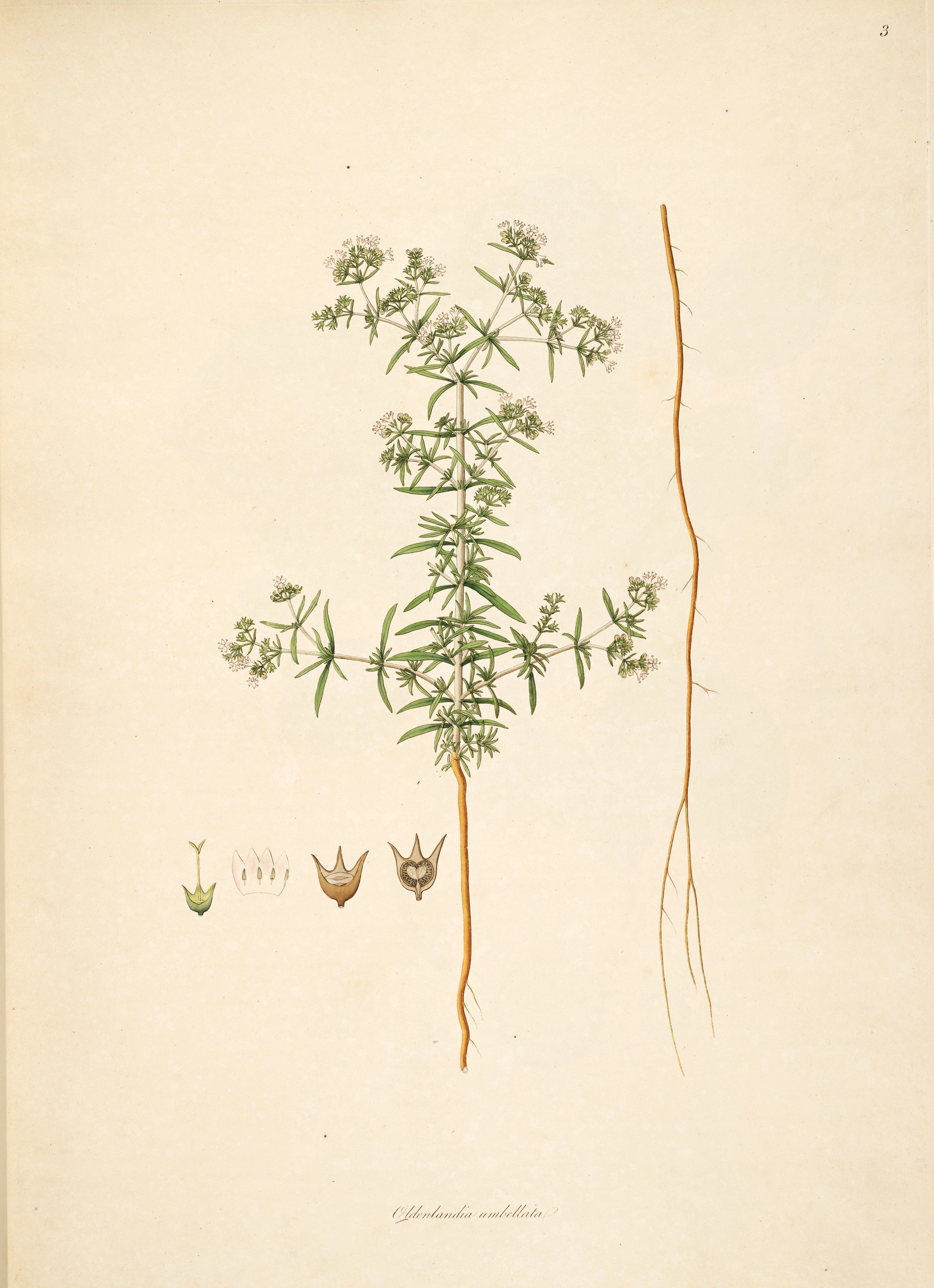

Scientific classification
- Kingdom: Plantae
- Clade: Tracheophytes
- Clade: Angiosperms
- Clade: Eudicots
- Clade: Asterids
- Order: Gentianales
- Family: Rubiaceae
- Genus: Oldenlandia
- Species: O. umbellata

Binomial name
- Oldenlandia umbellata L.

= Oldenlandia umbellata =

Species of plant

Oldenlandia umbellata (called chay root or choy root, from its Tamil name, chaaya ver) is a low-growing plant native to India. A colour-fast red dye can be extracted from the root bark of (preferably) a two-year-old plant. Chay root dye was once used with a mordant to impart a red colour to fabrics such as calico, wool, and silk.

It is grown on the Coromandel Coast in India.

== Medicinal use ==
This plant is well known in Siddha Medicine for its styptic property. It is also a drug that can be administered for bronchial asthma, as a decoction of the entire plant, a decoction made from its root and liquorice in the ratio-10:4, or the powdered root is given either with water or honey.

A decoction of the root also is a febrifuge.
