= TV Party =

- Glenn O'Brien and the TV Party logo
- Genre: Public-access television, talk show
- Presented by: Glenn O'Brien
- Country of origin: United States

Original release
- Release: 1978 – 1982

Related
- no wave cinema, Colab's three TV series on Manhattan Cable: All Color News, Potato Wolf and Red Curtain

TV Party was a public-access television No Wave cable TV show hosted by Glenn O'Brien in New York City that ran from 1978 to 1982.

== History ==
After Glenn O'Brien was a guest on the weekly variety television show, The Coca Crystal Show: If I Can’t Dance, You Can Keep Your Revolution, he went on to create his own show, TV Party.

Glenn O'Brien was the host of TV Party; Chris Stein, the co-founder of the pop band Blondie, was the co-host; and Walter "Doc" Steding was the leader of the TV Party orchestra. Amos Poe was the director. Fab Five Freddy (Fred Brathwaite) was a sometime cameraman and guest. Bobby Grossman was the staff photographer. Guests on the show included Mick Jones, David Byrne, Debbie Harry, James Chance, Klaus Nomi, Charles Rocket, Elliott Murphy and Jean-Michel Basquiat.

In 2005 Brink Films has re-released some of the best of the 80 plus episodes on DVD, as well as a documentary about the TV show.

In 2019, public access show The Special Without Brett Davis paid tribute to TV Party, with host Brett Davis portraying O'Brien, alongside performers such as Ziwe Fumudoh and Spike Einbinder.

The show could be described as free-form, but because of Stein and Blondie, was also linked into New York's music scene. As an example, in 1980, the members of Blondie previewed The Tide Is High on the show.
