= Bi-Conicals of the Rammellzee =

Studio album by Rammellzee
- Released: 2004
- Recorded: 2002–2003
- Studio: New York City; Munich; Berlin; Tokyo
- Genre: Experimental hip hop, East Coast hip hop, industrial hip hop, electro, abstract hip hop, spoken word
- Length: 48:23
- Label: Gomma
- Producer: Ferris Wheel, Jaws, Munk, Stuart Argabright, Taketo, Death Comet Crew, Naughty, Kaos

Rammellzee chronology
This Is What You Made Me (2003)	Bi-Conicals of the Rammellzee (2004)

Singles from Bi-Conicals of the Rammellzee
- 1. "Cheesy Lipstick" Released: 2003; 2. "Pay the Rent" Released: 2004

Professional ratings
Review scores
Source	Rating
The Observer	4/5 stars
PopMatters	favorable
Stylus Magazine	C+
XLR8R	favorable

Bi-Conicals of the Rammellzee is the second and final studio album by American graffiti artist and rapper Rammellzee. It was released on Gomma in 2004.

== Critical reception ==
Chris Campion of The Observer gave the album 4 stars out of 5, saying: "As impenetrable as it is wildly entertaining, this record will fuel Rammellzee's reputation for at least another two decades."

In 2013, Spin included it on the "25 Best Albums by Rappers Over 40" list.

== Track listing ==
No.	Title	Producer(s)	Length
1.	"Do We Have to Show a Resume?"	Ferris Wheel	5:12
2.	"The Rammelzee vs. K-Rob: Beat Bop Part 2"	Jaws	4:26
3.	"Cheesy Lipstick"	Munk	4:03
4.	"Jamin Zabar Jamin Zabar"	Stuart Argabright	4:13
5.	"Pay the Rent" (featuring Shockdell)	Jaws	3:31
6.	"Quack"	Taketo	4:13
7.	"Sigma 1"	Munk	5:16
8.	"Traxxstoppers"	Stuart Argabright	4:06
9.	"Pogo"	Munk	4:15
10.	"Funky Dream Part 3"	Death Comet Crew	3:10
11.	"When Hell Freezes Over"	Naughty, Kaos	5:58

== Personnel ==
Credits adapted from liner notes.

- Rammellzee – vocals
- Ferris Wheel – production (1)
- K-Rob – vocals (2)
- Jaws – production (2, 5)
- Glammerlicious – mixing (2)
- Kerry Lach – vocals (3)
- Munk – production (3, 7, 9), mixing (4, 10), project coordination, final realization
- Mathias Modica – synthesizer bass (4)
- Stuart Argabright – production (4, 8), mixing (4, 8, 10)
- Shockdell – vocals (5)
- Stefano Rossi – mixing (5)
- Taketo – production (6)
- Paul Geluso – bass guitar (8), mixing (8)
- DJ Tim Sweeney – turntables (8)
- Shinichi Shimokawa – synthesizer guitar (8), drum programming (10), synthesizer bass (10)
- Michael Diekmann – guitar (10)
- Death Comet Crew – production (10)
- Celia Bullwinkel – vocals (11)
- Naughty – production (11)
- Chaos – production (11)
