= Glenn O'Brien =

American writer (1947–2017)

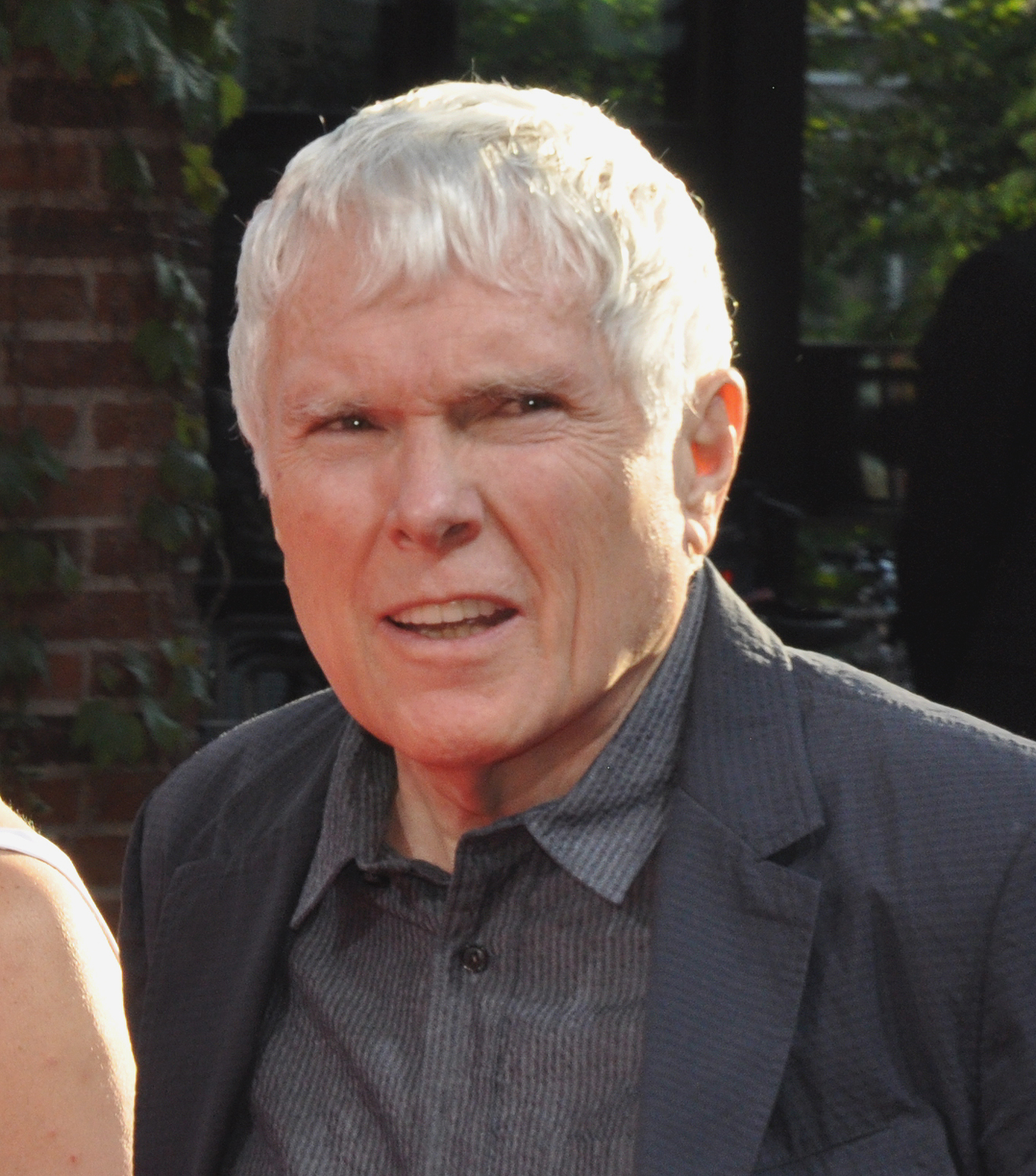
- O'Brien in 2015
- Born: March 2, 1947; Cleveland, Ohio, U.S.
- Died: April 7, 2017 (aged 70); Manhattan, New York, U.S.
- Education: Georgetown University; Columbia Graduate School of Arts and Sciences
- Occupation: Writer
- Spouses: Jude Jade; Barbara Egan; Gina Nanni (m. 1999)
- Children: 2
- Writing career
- Notable awards: Named one of Top 10 Most Stylish Men in America by GQ

Glenn O'Brien (March 2, 1947 – April 7, 2017) was an American writer who focused largely on the subjects of art, music, and fashion. He was featured for many years as "The Style Guy" in GQ magazine and published a book with that title. He worked as a writer and editor at several publications, including Interview, Rolling Stone, Playboy, High Times, Spin, and Details. He also published the arts and literature magazine Bald Ego from 2003 to 2005.

== Life and career ==
=== Early life and education ===
O'Brien was born in Cleveland, Ohio, where he attended the Jesuit St. Ignatius High School. O'Brien went to Georgetown University and edited the Georgetown Journal, which was founded by Condé Nast. O'Brien later studied film at the Columbia Graduate School of Arts and Sciences.

=== Career ===
In his early career, O'Brien was a member of Pop artist Andy Warhol's Factory. His college classmate Bob Colacello became managing editor of inter/VIEW: A Monthly Film Journal in late 1970 and hired O'Brien as an associate editor. The Rolling Stones album Sticky Fingers (1971) features an image photographed by Warhol of O'Brien in his underwear on the inner layer of the front cover, revealed when the original jacket's zipper was opened.

O'Brien succeeded Colacello as the managing editor of Interview in 1972. His first issue, published in February, was a special issue devoted to Marilyn Monroe, followed by a James Dean issue in March. With the May issue, O'Brien significantly broadened the magazine's coverage, introducing sections on art, music, books, and fashion. He worked with artist Richard Bernstein to produce the elegant new Interview logo, which is still in use today.

O'Brien's tenure was also marked by conflicts with photographer Francesco Scavullo and designer Giorgio di Sant'Angelo, as well as disputes his wife, Jude Jade. According to Colacello, Warhol encouraged him to incorporate O'Brien's marital problems into a proposed script called Modern Marriage.

In 1973, Warhol's business manager Fred Hughes arranged for journalist Rosemary Kent of Women's Wear Daily to join Interview as editor-in-chief while O'Brien was retained as "production manager." The arrangement lasted only one issue, August 1973, after which O'Brien resigned. O'Brien's departure also contributed to the end of his marriage to Jude Jade, who had returned to work at Interview after she was dismissed by Di Sant'Angelo, but O'Brien made her leave the magazine with him.

O'Brien was subsequently hired by Jann Wenner to oversee Rolling Stone magazine. He later returned to Interview as a contributing editor, and during the punk era he wrote the music column "Glenn O'Brien's Beat" for 12 years.

In the late 1970s, O'Brien had a band called Konelrad, which he described as a "socialist-realist rock band".

From 1978 to 1982, O'Brien hosted a New York city Public-access television cable TV show called TV Party. During this period, O'Brien edited several iconic downtown novels, including Kathy Acker's Blood and Guts in High School and The Correct Sadist by Terence Sellers.

In 1980, he wrote the screenplay (which he also co-produced with Patrick Montgomery) for a film to be called New York Beat, starring Jean-Michel Basquiat It was released in 2000 as Downtown 81, with post-production managed by O'Brien and Maripol. In June 1980, O'Brien's article "Graffiti '80: The State of the Outlaw Art" was published in High Times magazine. It was the first major survey of the burgeoning graffiti art scene, which featured Basquiat, Fab 5 Freddy and Lee Quiñones. O'Brien has a cameo appearance as an art dealer in the hip-hop film Wild Style.

After leaving TV Party, in addition to continuing his writing career, he attempted a stint as a stand-up comedian, and was a contributing editor of Allure, Harper's Bazaar, and Creative Director of advertising at Barneys New York. For 10 years, he wrote a monthly column for Artforum magazine. O'Brien edited Madonna's 1992 Sex book. He had been introduced to Madonna a decade prior through her relationship with Basquiat. He also worked with her on The Girlie Show World Tour book in 1993.

In January 2008, he was named editorial director of Brant Publications, which included Interview as well as Art in America and Antiques. In June 2009, it was announced that he had left his position with Brant Publications.

== Death ==
O'Brien died of complications from pneumonia in Manhattan on April 7, 2017, at the age of 70. Following the news of his death, Madonna called O'Brien "an amazing soul and a creative genius" in a statement on Twitter.

== Personal life ==
O'Brien's first wife, Judy, went by the name Jude Jade as a reference to the Beatles song "Hey Jude." She was an intern at Interview magazine and sold advertising for the magazine while O'Brien was an editor. They had a son, Terence O'Brien Pincus. His second marriage was to artist and designer Barbara Egan. In 1999, O'Brien married his third wife, publicist Gina Nanni. The couple had a son, Oscar Lucien O'Brien.

O'Brien lent his collection of early Basquiat works to various exhibitions, including Deitch Projects, and co-authored a major volume on the artist.

== Awards and honors ==
On February 17, 2009, O'Brien was named one of Top 10 Most Stylish Men in America by GQ.

== Published works ==
- O'Brien, Glenn; Bertoglio, Edo (December 1, 2001). New York Beat: Jean-Michael Basquiat Downtown 81. Tokyo: Petit Grand. ISBN 978-4-939102-22-6.
- Demarchelier, Patrick; O'Brien, Glenn (October 20, 1995). Patrick Demarchelier: Photographs. Little, Brown and Company. ISBN 978-0-8212-2169-3.
- O'Brien, Glenn (2000). The Style Guy. Ballantine Books. ISBN 978-0-345-42727-4.
- Lowit, Roxanne; O'Brien, Glenn (January 28, 2005). People. Assouline. ISBN 978-2-84323-286-2.
- O'Brien, Glenn, ed. (September 25, 2005). Sante D'Orazio: Pam: American Icon. Jeff Koons and Richard Prince. Prestel Publishing. ISBN 978-3-8296-0187-0.
- O'Brien, Glenn (November 30, 2010). Jean-Michel Basquiat. Jean-Louis Prat and Susanne Reichling. Hatje Cantz Verlag GmbH & Co KG. ISBN 978-3-7757-2593-4.
- O'Brien, Glenn (2011). How to Be a Man: A Guide to Style and Behavior for the Modern Gentleman. Rizzoli. ISBN 978-0-8478-3547-8.
- O'Brien, Glenn, ed. (2013). The Cool School: Writing from America's Hip Underground. Library of America. ISBN 978-1-59853-256-2.
- Snow, Dash (July 31, 2013). O'Brien, Glenn (ed.). Dash Snow: I Love You, Stupid. Mary Hansen. D.A.P./Distributed Art Publishers. ISBN 978-1-938922-14-5.
- Inez van Lamsweerde/Vinoodh Matadin. Pretty Much Everything. M/M (design). Taschen America, LLC. November 15, 2013. ISBN 978-3-8365-2793-4.
- O'Brien, Glenn, ed. (November 30, 2013). Eddie Martinez: Paintings. Ross Simonini; Monica Ramirez-Montagut. PictureBox. ISBN 978-1-939799-06-7.
- Mark Grotjahn: Masks. Dakin Hart. Rizzoli. October 27, 2015. ISBN 978-0-8478-4407-4.
- Berluti: At Their Feet. Mathias Augustyniask (illustrator); Erwan Frotin (photographer); M/M (Paris) (design). Rizzoli. 2016. ISBN 978-0-8478-4917-8.
- Hennessy, a Toast to the World's Preeminent Spirit. Jean-Philippe Delhomme (illustrator). Rizzoli. February 14, 2017. ISBN 978-0-8478-4752-5.
- O'Brien, Glenn (May 23, 2017). Like Art: Glenn O'Brien on Advertising. Karma, New York. ISBN 978-1-942607-48-9.
- Chris Martin. Dan Nadel; Nancy Princenthal; Trinie Dalton. Rizzoli. November 28, 2017. ISBN 978-88-572-3474-8.
