= H.I.P. H.O.P. =

H.I.P. H.O.P. is France's first television show and first regular nationwide weekly show in the world to be dedicated to the hip hop culture. It was broadcast each Sunday afternoon on the French national channel TF1 in 1984, from January 14, for forty-three weeks, which had a certain impact on the beginnings of the French hip hop scene. The host was Sidney, who was already presenting a hip-hop radio program since 1981, along with the Paris City Breakers. They had guests such as Herbie Hancock on February 19, Sugarhill Gang, Kurtis Blow, Afrika Bambaataa, The Rock Steady Crew, Art of Noise and Madonna, plus graffiti artists such as Futura 2000.

Michael Holman, host of Graffiti Rock, claims to be the first person to broadcast a nationwide hip-hop television show, but the show was launched in June 1984 by eighty-eight syndicated stations across the United States, starring Kool Moe Dee, Special K, Run-DMC and The New York City Breakers. Just two years prior, in 1982, Holman aired on New York cable television two much earlier programmes that were dedicated to hip-hop culture called On Beat and TV New York. These local shows already had featured hip-hop artists such as Fab 5 Freddy, DJ High Priest, The New York City Breakers, graffiti artist Phase 2, Futura, DJ Jazzy Joyce, K-Rob and Tim Single.
