= Debi Mazar =

American actress (born 1964)

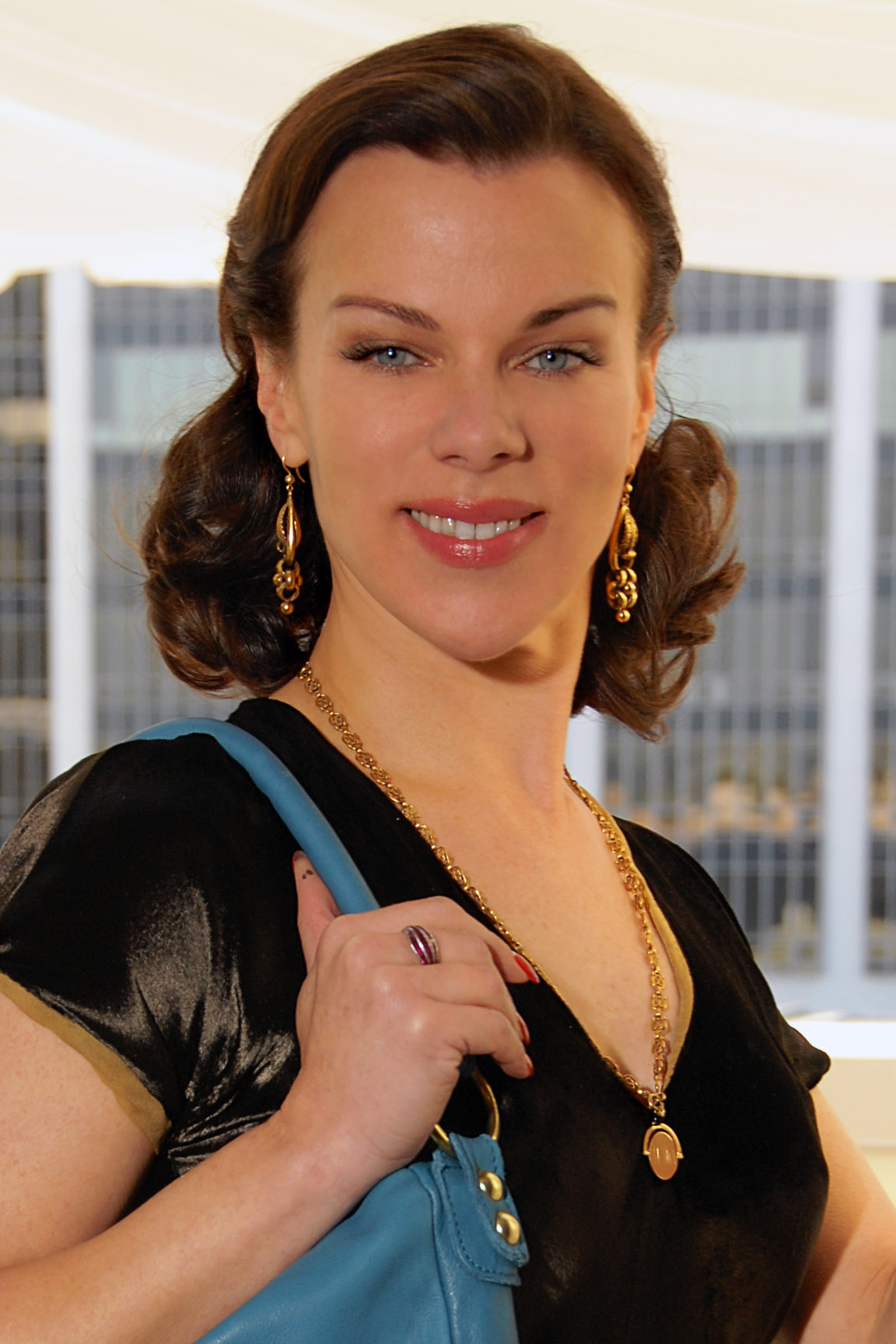
- Mazar in 2009
- Born: August 13, 1964 (age 62); New York City, U.S.
- Occupation: Actress
- Years active: 1982–present
- Spouse: Gabriele Corcos (m. 2002)
- Children: 2

Debi Mazar Corcos (/ˈmeɪzɑːr/; born August 13, 1964) is an American actress and television personality. She began her career with supporting roles in Goodfellas (1990), Little Man Tate (1991), Singles (1992), and Batman Forever (1995), followed by lead roles on the legal drama series Civil Wars (1991–1993) and L.A. Law (1993–1994). She portrayed press agent Shauna Roberts on the HBO series Entourage. She starred as Maggie Amato on TV Land's Younger, and alongside her husband Gabriele Corcos in the Cooking Channel series Extra Virgin.

== Early life ==
Mazar was born in Queens Village, Queens, New York City, the daughter of Nancy and Harry Mazar. Her father was born Harija Fogelmanis to a Jewish family in German-occupied Latvia. Mazar had no knowledge of her father's ancestry until her twenties, as he practiced Catholicism. Mazar's parents annulled their marriage shortly after she was born, and she spent her early life with her mother in the country in upstate New York along in East Village, Manhattan. As a teenager, she relocated to Long Island, where she lived with her godparents.

Mazar left home at the age of 15, and by 16 she was working as a VIP doorperson at the Mudd Club in New York City. She then went to work at Danceteria. Mazar worked various odd jobs, including selling jewelry at Fiorucci with Linda Ramone and Joey Arias, and later as a dental assistant.

In the early 1980s, Mazar was part of the downtown club scene in New York City, socializing with artists Jean-Michel Basquiat, Keith Haring, and Kenny Scharf.

== Career ==
While working at Danceteria, Mazar met Madonna, who hired Mazar to do her makeup for her first music video "Everybody" (1982). She appeared in six of Madonna's music videos: "Papa Don't Preach" (1986), "True Blue" (1986), "Justify My Love" (1990), "Deeper and Deeper" (1992), "Music" (2000) and "Danceteria" (2026). Mazar originated the hair and makeup for the 1988 play Speed-the-Plow.

As a teenager, Mazar was a b-girl in New York City. Her first television appearance was on the pilot for the hip-hop television dance show Graffiti Rock, in 1984. Her first major role was playing the legal secretary Denise Iannello on Civil Wars in the early 1990s. When that series was cancelled, her character was brought over as a recurring role during the 1993 and 1994 seasons of the TV drama L.A. Law.

Mazar has played a number of minor supporting roles in a variety of films, including Sandy, a friend of Henry Hill's mistress in Goodfellas (1990); The Doors (1991); a small role in Spike Lee's Malcolm X (1992); Bullets Over Broadway (1994); and as Spice (of Sugar and Spice, with Drew Barrymore as Sugar) in Batman Forever (1995).

Mazar played the villain Regina, a modern-day Cruella de Vil, in the family film Beethoven's 2nd (1993). She has appeared in independent films Inside Monkey Zetterland and Nowhere and her short-lived sitcom, Temporarily Yours. She appeared in the Space Monkeys' music video "Sugarcane".

Mazar appeared on a Friends episode in its eighth season ("The One Where Rachel Has a Baby, Part One"). Mazar played Doreen, the Evil Bitch, a crazed pregnant woman who shares a hospital room with Rachel. In the 1999 docudrama film The Insider she played character Lowell Bergman's assistant Debi. From 2000-02 she played Jackie on the television drama That's Life. She provided the voice of Maria Latore in the video games Grand Theft Auto III (2001) and Grand Theft Auto: San Andreas (2004). Also in 2004, she made a cameo appearance in the film Collateral in which she played the passenger while arguing with her boyfriend (Bodhi Elfman) while the main protagonist, Max Durocher (Jamie Foxx), is driving them to their destination.

From 2004 to 2011, she had a supporting role on Entourage as press agent Shauna Roberts. She had a recurring role on the sitcom Living with Fran, as Merrill, the cousin of Fran Drescher's character. She did a two-episode stint on the television series Ugly Betty as fraudster Leah Stillman.

Mazar was a contestant on the ninth season of Dancing With the Stars. She was partnered with Maksim Chmerkovskiy and finished in twelfth place, eliminated in the third week (October 6, 2009). In 2012, Mazar played Jessica, a glamorous, leather-clad villainess in Home Alone: The Holiday Heist.

On January 19, 2011, Mazar and her husband Gabriele Corcos began hosting the cooking show Extra Virgin on the Cooking Channel, and released a cookbook, Recipes & Love From Our Tuscan Kitchen, in 2014. Mazar and Corcos appeared on an episode of the ABC talk show The Chew in 2014 to promote their show, Extra Virgin. Their two daughters starred in the series, which depicted their lives and showcased their own recipes. The show was scripted and lasted five seasons. In 2015, Mazar and her husband started another series on the Cooking Channel entitled Extra Virgin Americana where they travel the U.S., road trip style, with their children and family friend searching for great food.

From 2015 to 2021, Mazar starred in Younger with Sutton Foster and Hilary Duff as Maggie Amato. The series met critical acclaim and was renewed for a seventh season in 2019, making it the longest-running original series in TV Land network's history.

Mazar appeared in the second season of The $100,000 Pyramid reboot on ABC on August 6, 2017. In the main game, she helped her contestant get seven clues in 15 seconds causing host Michael Strahan to say, "I think that's the quickest round we've ever had, 15 seconds!"

In 2018 she played Ava Gardner in the Spanish period comedy-drama television series Arde Madrid, telling the story of the period which the American actress spent in Madrid during Francoist Spain.

Between 2020–2021, Mazar and her husband ran a cafe/restaurant called Tuscan Gun in the Windsor Terrace neighborhood of Brooklyn. Mazar and Corcos formerly hosted an internet show focused on Tuscan cuisine, Under The Tuscan Gun.

In 2024, Mazar played Medusa in the Netflix show, KAOS.

Also released in 2024, she appeared in the Australian drama series Ladies in Black, about Goods Department Store, playing Magda.

== Personal life ==
Mazar dated artist Kenny Scharf and graffiti artist Kel 139 in the 1980s. She dated actor Paul Reubens for several years beginning in 1993. Reubens later credited Mazar with ending his depression resulting from his 1991 arrest. According to Mazar, their relationship was platonic yet inseparable: "we were best friends, and the truth of the matter is, basically, we had a love affair that was just cerebral."

She married Gabriele Corcos on March 16, 2002, in a ceremony officiated by Ellen Burstyn. They have two daughters. The family formerly lived in Los Angeles and moved to Windsor Terrace, Brooklyn in 2009. They divided their time between Brooklyn and a 15th-century home outside of Florence, Italy, that was given to them as a wedding present by Mazar's in-laws. Prior to the COVID-19 pandemic, Mazar and her family relocated to their Florence villa; she has Italian citizenship.

Mazar has a close friendship with pop star Madonna.

== Filmography ==
=== Film ===
Year	Title	Role	Notes	Ref.
1990	Goodfellas	Sandy		
1991	The Doors	Whiskey Girl		
1991	Jungle Fever	Denise		
1991	Little Man Tate	Gina		
1992	In the Soup	Suzie		
1992	Inside Monkey Zetterland	Daphne		
1992	Love Is Like That	Delores		
1992	Singles	Brenda		
1992	Malcolm X	Peg		
1992	Toys	Nurse Debbie		
1993	So I Married an Axe Murderer	Susan		
1993	Money for Nothing	Monica Russo		
1993	Beethoven's 2nd	Regina		
1994	Bullets Over Broadway	Violet "Vi"		
1995	Batman Forever	"Spice"		
1995	Empire Records	Jane		
1996	Things I Never Told You	Diane		
1996	Girl 6	Girl #39		
1996	Trees Lounge	Crystal		
1996	Red Ribbon Blues	Darcy		
1996	Space Truckers	Cindy		
1997	Meet Wally Sparks	Sandy Gallo		
1997	Nowhere	"Kozy"		
1997	She's So Lovely	Georgie		
1997	The Deli	Teresa		
1997	Casper: A Spirited Beginning	Angie Lyons	Direct-to-video	
1997	Trouble on the Corner	Ericca Rice		
1998	Frogs for Snakes	Simone		
1998	Hush	Lisa		
1998	There's No Fish Food in Heaven	Rosie		
1998	Marry Me or Die	-		
1999	The Insider	Debbie De Luca		
2000	More Dogs Than Bones	Mary		
2000	Held for Ransom	Rita		
2000	Downtown 81	Peppermint Lounge Dancer		
2002	Ten Tiny Love Stories	"Six"		
2002	The Tuxedo	CSA Agent Steena		
2002	The Groovenians	Yalda / Swirly / Cuckoo Bird (voice)	Short film	
2003	Who Killed the Idea?	Mysterious Woman	Short film	
2003	Deception	Janet Steiner		
2004	Collateral	Young Professional Woman		
2004	Goodnight, Joseph Parker	Rita		
2004	My Tiny Universe	Bonnie		
2005	Be Cool	Marla		
2005	Edmond	Matron		
2005	Wait	Joanne	Short film	
2006	Lies & Alibis	Detective Bryce		
2006	Red Riding Hood	Red's Mother		
2008	A Beautiful Life	Susan		
2008	The Women	Tanya		
2013	Lovelace	Dolly Sharp		
2013	Return to Babylon	Gloria Swanson		
2014	She's Funny That Way	Vickie		
2014	The Actor	Bag Lady	Short film	
2015	Entourage	Shauna Roberts		
2017	The Only Living Boy in New York	Anna		
2017	Wonder Wheel	Birthday Party Guest		
2021	A Christmas Number One	Colleen Porter		
2022	Rainbow	Party Guest		
2023	The Kill Room	The Kimono		
2025	The Running Man	Americano		
2026	Confessions II	Herself	Short film	
2026	The Housewife			
TBA	The Last Mrs. Parrish		Post-production	
TBA	Object Permanence	Cassandra	Post-production	

=== Television ===
Year	Title	Role	Notes	Ref.
1984	Graffiti Rock	Dancer	Episode: "Pilot"	
1991–93	Civil Wars	Denise Iannello	Main cast	
1993–94	L.A. Law	Denise Iannello	Main cast (season 8)	
1994	Witch Hunt	The Manicurist	TV movie	
1995	Burke's Law	Rachel Davis	Episode: "Who Killed the Motor Car Maverick?"	
1997	E! True Hollywood Story	Herself	Episode: "From Pinup to Sex Queen: Bettie Page"	
1997	Temporarily Yours	Deb DeAngelo	Main cast	
1998	Witness to the Mob	Deborah Gravano	TV movie	
1998	David and Lisa	Maggie	TV movie	
1998–99	Working	Liz Tricoli	Main cast (season 2)	
1999	The Wild Thornberrys	Mongoose (voice)	Episode: "Darwin Plays the Palace"	
1999	Providence	Vonda Vickers	Episodes: "Thank You, Providence: Parts 1 & 2"	
1999	The Sissy Duckling	Mother Duck 2 (voice)	TV movie	
2000	Get Real	Kate Harris	Episode: "Saved"	
2000–02	That's Life	Jackie O'Grady	Main cast	
2002	Hollywood Squares	Herself/Panelist	Episode: "May 2 & 3, 2002"	
2002	Friends	Doreen, The Evil Bitch	Episode: "The One Where Rachel Has a Baby: Part 1"	
2003	Wanda at Large	Jenny Hawkins	Unsold pilot, series was picked up from retooled second pilot	
2003–04	7th Heaven	Nurse Kelly	Recurring role (season 8)	
2003–05	All of Us	Alex	Recurring role (seasons 1–2)	
2004	The Practice	Gigi Coley	Recurring role (season 8)	
2004	CSI: Miami	Rebecca Briggs	Episode: "Speed Kills"	
2004–11	Entourage	Shauna Roberts	Recurring role (seasons 1, 5–6, 8), main cast (seasons 2–3), guest (seasons 4, 7)	
2005	NYPD Blue	Maxine Annunziato	Episode: "Lenny Scissorhands"	
2005–06	Living with Fran	Cousin Merrill	Recurring role (season 2)	
2006	Ghost Whisperer	Josie	Episode: "The Woman of His Dreams"	
2006	Ugly Betty	Leah Feldman	Recurring role (season 1)	
2007	Top Chef	Herself	Episode: "Seven"	
2008	Privileged	Debra	Episode: "Pilot"	
2008	Law & Order: Special Victims Unit	Peggy Bernardi	Episode: "Babes"	
2009	Celebrity Ghost Stories	Herself	Episode: "Barry Williams, Debi Mazar, Greg Grunberg and Sammy Hagar"	
2009	Dancing With The Stars	Herself	Contestant (season 9)	
2009	Burn Notice	Amy	Episode: "Friends Like These"	
2009	Castle	Paula Haas	Episode: "When the Bough Breaks"	
2010	Sesame Street	Herself	Episode: "Jack Grows His Own Beanstalk"	
2010	Hell's Kitchen	Herself	Episode: "12 Chefs Compete"	
2010	RuPaul's Drag U	Herself/Guest Judge	Episode: "Moms on the Verge"	
2010	Shalom Sesame	Herself	Episode: "Chanukah: The Missing Menorah"	
2010	Iron Chef America	Herself/ICA Judge	Episode: "Symon/Burrell vs. Cora/Irvine"	
2010	The Life & Times of Tim	Rochelle (voice)	Episode: "Rodney Has a Wife?"	
2010	Hawthorne	Donna Alberghetti	Episode: "Hidden Truths"	
2010	Jonas	Mona Klein	Recurring role (season 2)	
2010–12	Unique Eats	Herself	Recurring role (season 1–4)	
2011	Iron Chef America	Herself/ICA Judge	Episode: "Holiday Battle Sparkling Wine: Garces vs. Lata"	
2011	Love Lust	Herself	Episode: "Make-Up"	
2011	Food(ography)	Herself	Episode: "Los Angeles"	
2011	Good Vibes	Barbara "Babs" Brando (voice)	Main cast	
2011–12	The Perfect 3	Herself	Episode: "Salads" & "Pizza"	
2011–15	Extra Virgin	Herself/Co-Host	Main co-host	
2012	Melissa & Joey	Harper Quinn	Episode: "The Knockout"	
2012	Happily Divorced	Jan	Episode: "The Back-Up Fran"	
2012	Home Alone: The Holiday Heist	Jessica	TV movie	
2013	Not My Mama's Meals	Herself	Episode: "Getting Saucy!"	
2015	Park Bench with Steve Buscemi	Herself	Episode: "Sidekicker"	
2015	The Kitchen	Herself/Host	Episode: "Freezer Fixes and Pantry Staples"	
2015–17	Beat Bobby Flay	Herself/Judge/Mentor	Recurring judge & mentor	
2015–21	Younger	Maggie Amato	Main cast	
2016	All-Star Academy	Herself/Co-Host/Judge	Episode: "Geography"	
2016	Extra Virgin Americana	Herself/Co-Host	Main co-host	
2016	Project Runway All Stars	Herself/Guest Judge	Episode: "Rebel with a Cause"	
2016	Elementary	Detective Cosa	Episode: "It Serves You Right"	
2017	So Cosmo	Herself	Episode: "Vol. 1, No. 2: Big New Futures"	
2017	The $100,000 Pyramid	Herself/Celebrity Player	Episode: "Bobby Moynihan vs. Debi Mazar and Wendie Malick vs. Jesse Palmer"	
2017–19	Happy!	Isabella Scaramucci	Recurring role	
2018	Match Game	Herself/Celebrity Panelist	Episode: "Episode #3.16"	
2018	The Simpsons	Minnie Szyslak (voice)	Episode: "King Leer"	
2018	Arde Madrid	Ava Gardner	Main cast	
2019	Worst Cooks in America	Herself/Judge	Episode: "The Day We've Been Waiting For"	
2020	Power	Doloris	Recurring role (season 6)	
2020	Katy Keene	Herself	Episode: "Chapter Twelve: Chain of Fools"	
2020	At Home with Amy Sedaris	"Jo-Jo"	Episode: "First Dates"	
2021	The Other Two	Herself	Episode: "Pat Connects with Her Fans"	
2022	The Pentaverate	Patty Davis	Main cast	
2023	City Island	Laney (voice)	Episode: "History"	
2023	East New York	Ann-Marie Quinlan	Recurring role	
2024	Ladies in Black	Magda Szombathelyi	Main cast	
2024	Kaos	Medusa	Recurring role	
2024	Emily in Paris	Marlena	Episode: "All Roads Lead to Rome"	
2024	Blue Bloods	Evaline Romano	Episode: "Life Sentence"	
2025	The Iris Affair	Celia Baxter	3 episodes	
2025	The Walsh Sisters	Chaquie	5 episodes	
2026	The Mob	Herself	6 episodes	

=== Video games ===
Year	Title	Role	Notes	Ref.
2001	Grand Theft Auto III	Maria Latore		
2004	Grand Theft Auto: San Andreas	Maria Latore		
2021	Grand Theft Auto: The Trilogy – The Definitive Edition	Maria Latore	Archival recordings Remasters of Grand Theft Auto III and Grand Theft Auto: San Andreas only	

=== Music videos ===
Year	Artist	Title	Ref.
1982	Madonna	"Everybody"	
1986	Madonna	"Papa Don't Preach"	
1986	Madonna	"True Blue"	
1990	Madonna	"Justify My Love"	
1992	Madonna	"Deeper and Deeper"	
1997	Space Monkeys	"Sugar Cane"	
2000	Madonna	"Music"	
2026	Madonna	Confessions II	
