= Gray (band) =

Experimental band from New York City

- Origin: New York City, U.S.
- Genres: Avant-garde metal; Industrial; Electro; Avant-garde jazz; No wave; Noise rock
- Years active: 1979–1981, 1988, 1996, 2010–present
- Labels: Plush Safe; Ubiquity
- Members: Michael Holman; Nick Taylor
- Past members: Jean-Michel Basquiat; Shannon Dawson; Vincent Gallo; Wayne Clifford (Justin Thyme)
- Website: gray-nyc.bandcamp.com

Gray is an American experimental band formed by artist Jean-Michel Basquiat and filmmaker Michael Holman in 1979, of whom filmmaker Vincent Gallo was also a member. The group was influenced by the members' artist backgrounds and the sonic experimentation of their contemporaries in New York's no wave scene. Gray performed at venues such as the Mudd Club and CBGB, which were the epicenter of New York's underground scene in the late 1970s and early 1980s.

The original Gray lineup never released a record, but the band recorded music that was used in films, including The Radiant Child, Downtown 81, Blank City, Downtown Calling, and Basquiat. Gray was revived in 2011 by original members Michael Holman and Nick Taylor.

== History ==
On April 29, 1979, Michael Holman hosted the Canal Zone Party at Canal and Greenwich Street. The party was planned to showcase the graffiti of the Fabulous Five graffiti crew to the downtown scene. Jean-Michel Basquiat, then working under the pseudonym SAMO, showed up to the event to participate as a graffiti artist. He revealed his identity and asked Holman if he wanted to form a band.

The band went by the names Test Pattern, Bad Fools, and Channel 9 before Basquiat named the band Gray after Gray's Anatomy, a book his mother gave him as a child. Gray originally consisted of Basquiat, Holman, a friend of Basquiat's named Shannon Dawson (later co-founder of the band Konk), and Wayne Clifford (also known as Justin Thyme). Dawson played trumpet, Clifford played a keyboard, Holman drums and Basquiat played clarinet, guitar, and the Wasp synthesizer. Holman recalled, "We played this angry, blaring, loud, confrontational music. Sometimes it was kind of mellow too, but it was very minimal." Dawson's trumpet wasn't fitting in with the sounds they wanted to create, so he was replaced by Nick Taylor, who played guitar. Eventually Clifford introduced the band to his friend Vincent Gallo, and he joined them.

Gray performed at nightclubs such as Max's Kansas City, CBGB, Hurrah and the Mudd Club. They described their music as "ignorant," which was defined as "carelessly done or casually created work of art or sound or music that should not have worked but [actually] worked brilliantly." Basquiat stated he was "inspired by John Cage at the time – music that isn’t really music. We were trying to be incomplete, abrasive, oddly beautiful."

Our attitude was like, "Let's embrace the idea that we don't know how to play our instruments and let's only have people in the band who don't know how to play instruments. Let's approach the instruments in a new way. Let's play them as if we were aliens from another world and we had no idea how the instrument was meant to be played, but we knew beautiful music and sound when we heard it."

— Michael Holman

In June 1980, Basquiat participated in The Times Square Show and his career as a painter began to take off. In February 1981, he participated in the New York/New Wave exhibit at New York's PS1, and then in May 1981, he had his first solo show in Modena, Italy. After Gray performed at the Mudd Club in the summer of 1981, Basquiat left the band to focus on being an artist. After his departure, the band went their separate ways. Holman ventured into filmmaking, Taylor got into DJing, Clifford got into painting, and Gallo became an actor.

The original Gray lineup never released a record, but their song "Drum Mode" appeared on the soundtrack of Edo Bertoglio's film Downtown 81 (2000), starring Basquiat. Set in the downtown New York scene, it was filmed in late 1980 and early 1981. Gray reunited in 1988 to perform at Basquiat's memorial service. They came together again for the 1996 film Basquiat, directed by Julian Schnabel.

In the 1990s, Holman and Taylor created sonic music performances at clubs such as Club USA, Sybarite, Nuyorican Poets Cafe and The Ritz, where they opened for Todd Rundgren. Gray released their debut album, Shades Of..., in 2010 on Plush Safe Records. Reviewing the 27-track album for GQ, writer Glenn O'Brien described it as "the soundtrack of a better world." A remastered version of the album with additional remixes was released on Ubiquity Records in 2019. It features the work of producers such as Todd Rundgren, Hank Shocklee, Deantoni Parks, Mike Tewz, and King Britt.

Since re-launching Gray in 2011, Holman and Taylor have performed live for select appearances at art institutions, including the New Museum (2011), the Corcoran Gallery of Art (2012) the Parrish Art Museum (2012), and with Questlove at the Brooklyn Academy of Music (2012). They were scheduled to perform at the Museum of Fine Arts, Boston in 2020.

In 2022, the Montreal Museum of Fine Arts mounted the exhibition Seeing Loud: Basquiat and Music, which surveyed the influence of music in Basquiat's life and career. Gray was featured prominently in the exhibition.

== Discography ==
=== Albums ===
- 2010: Shades Of... (Plush Safe Records)
- 2019: Shades Of... Anthology (Ubiquity Records)
- 2024: Last of the Beats (Plush Safe Records)

==== Appearances ====
- 2001: Downtown 81 (Virgin Records)

=== Singles ===
- 2018: "Sweetness Of The New" (Original) / "Sweetness Of The New" (Free The Robots Remix) (Plush Safe Records UR7361)
