= Vincent Gallo =

American actor, filmmaker and musician (born 1961)

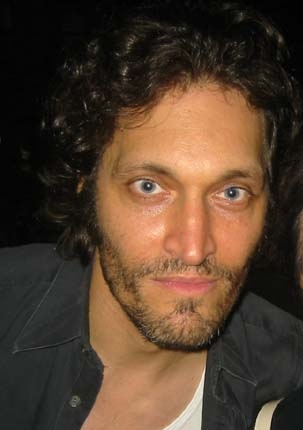
- Gallo in 2004
- Born: April 11, 1961 (age 65); Buffalo, New York, U.S.
- Occupations: Actor; filmmaker; musician; model; painter
- Years active: 1981–present
- Notable work: Buffalo '66; The Brown Bunny; Essential Killing
- Musical career
- Genres: Alternative; film score
- Instruments: Vocals; bass guitar; guitar
- Label: Warp
- Formerly of: Gray; Bohack; Bunny; RRIICCEE
- Website: vincentgallo.com

Vincent Gallo (born April 11, 1961) is an American actor, filmmaker, and musician. He has won several accolades, including a Volpi Cup for Best Actor, and has been nominated for the Palme d'Or, the Golden Lion, and the Bronze Horse.

Gallo was a successful painter and musician, working with Jean-Michel Basquiat and Lukas Haas. Gallo later became an actor and starred in films including Arizona Dream (1993), The House of the Spirits (1993), Palookaville (1995), The Funeral (1996), Freeway II: Confessions of a Trickbaby (1999), Trouble Every Day (2001), Stranded (2001), Tetro (2009), Metropia (2009), Essential Killing (2010), The Legend of Kaspar Hauser (2012), and Shut In (2022).

As a filmmaker, Gallo wrote, directed, and starred in Buffalo '66 (1998), The Brown Bunny (2003), Promises Written in Water (2010), and the upcoming Golden State Killer. He has also directed and starred in numerous short films, including The Agent (2010), and several music videos, such as "Going Inside" (2001), "Cosmopolitan Bloodloss" (2002), and "99 Problems" (2004). Gallo has released several albums, including When (2001), and worked as a model, having been photographed by Calvin Klein, H&M, Supreme, Persol, and Yves Saint Laurent.

Gallo's work has gained a cult following.

== Early life ==
Vincent Gallo was born on April 11, 1961, in Buffalo, New York, to Vincent Gallo Sr. and Janet Gallo. He has an older brother named Charles and a younger sister named Janine. Gallo was raised Catholic, and made his First Communion in 1969.

Gallo's parents are Sicilian and worked as hairdressers, with his father having retired to be "a gambler." Gallo has described his parents as dishonest people, saying "If it was my birthday, I knew my mother took me to the K-Mart and she stole my toy. She'd put it in the shopping cart and we'd walk out. I was raised with that." Growing up, Gallo says that his father was abusive and beat him on several occasions, including one instance where Gallo's father broke his nose. He has said that while growing up, his father was "this kind of dark, raging figurehead...That's not who he is today, but when I was a child there wasn't a day...when he didn't hit me, punish me, yell at me or tell me something I did wrong." Gallo's mother also forbade him from decorating his own room, which he shared with his siblings and grandfather, and from owning a guitar, leading Gallo to secretly hide the latter underneath his bed. Gallo has attributed his self-described controlling and perfectionist nature as a filmmaker to his childhood experiences.

Gallo claims that at the age of 12 he worked for the local mafia in Buffalo, helping them to perform small crimes, such as carjacking and shoplifting. Supposedly, Gallo worked for the mafia for approximately one year, and desired to continue down a life of crime and become a powerful gangster. However, he was eventually convinced by a mafia member, who felt that Gallo was wasting his potential, to abandon it in favor of a legitimate career.

After graduating from Sweet Home High School in 1978, Gallo left his home in Buffalo and ran away to New York City at the age of 16. He took up various jobs, including ones working in a hi-fi guitar shop and as a restaurant dishwasher.

Gallo claims he went on to race motorbikes professionally, supposedly without training, in Formula II. Gallo says he raced for Yamaha, but never won a national championship. He claims to have raced 125cc and 250cc WERA bikes in the 1980s; and later performed his own racing scenes in his 2004 film The Brown Bunny. In the film, Gallo rides a gold Honda NSR250, which he personally designed. He also went on to become a successful painter.

== Film career ==
=== 1980s–1990s ===
During Gallo's artistic period in the 1980s, when he worked as a musician and painter in New York City, he also began experimenting with film. Gallo created the short film "If You Feel Froggy, Jump" and appeared in the 1981 film Downtown 81 with painter Jean-Michel Basquiat. In 1984, Gallo acted in the No Wave film The Way It Is or Eurydice in the Avenues (1985) by Eric Mitchell, along with actors Steve Buscemi, Edwige Belmore, Mark Boone Junior and Rockets Redglare. In 1987, Gallo played a starring role in Doc's Kingdom, a little-seen independent film directed by Robert Kramer. He later played a small part in Martin Scorsese's Goodfellas. In 1993, Gallo gained notice in Europe for Emir Kusturica's Arizona Dream, where he played a major supporting role alongside Johnny Depp and Faye Dunaway. That film, however, only received a limited theatrical release in the United States over one year later. Gallo next appeared in supporting roles in The House of the Spirits (1993) and The Perez Family (1995). In 1996, he co-starred in Abel Ferrara's The Funeral. French director Claire Denis cast Gallo in several films such as the short film Keep It for Yourself, the TV movie U.S. Go Home, and its follow-up feature Nénette et Boni (1996).

In 1998, Gallo released his directorial debut film, Buffalo '66. The film received positive critical reception and was nominated for an award for "Best First Feature" at the Independent Spirit Awards. Gallo made this drama for $1.5 million, serving as writer, director, lead actor, and composer/performer of the soundtrack. The release of Buffalo '66 "gained him a solid fan base."

During filming, Gallo had difficulties working with actress Christina Ricci, who starred in the film alongside him. According to Ricci, Gallo was a "crazy lunatic man" and did not get along with her on the set. Ricci also said that Gallo mocked her weight several years after the film released, and that she has no interest in ever seeing his other films. Gallo disputes Ricci's account, and in 2018, wrote "I still smile when I see a picture of her and when she insults me in the press it reminds me that we are connected in some way, and for that I am grateful. Christina Ricci was my friend during the filming of Buffalo 66 and working with her made sense and felt natural....I insulted her jokingly one day to a friend and a sneaky gossip writer overheard me. Christina and I have not spoken since."

=== 2000s ===
In 2001, Gallo again collaborated with Denis, and appeared in her horror film Trouble Every Day.

In 2003, Gallo starred in and directed the film The Brown Bunny, which chronicles a motorcycle racer's cross-country road trip and co-starred Chloë Sevigny. The film, which contained a scene of Sevigny performing unsimulated oral sex upon Gallo, received an overwhelmingly negative critical response to its Cannes premiere and became a media scandal, in part due to Gallo's use of a still image from a sex scene on a promotional billboard. Andrea LeVasseur of Allmovie said that The Brown Bunny "premiered to much derision at the 2003 Cannes Film Festival." Film critic Roger Ebert stated that The Brown Bunny was the worst film in the history of Cannes. Gallo retorted by calling Ebert a "fat pig with the physique of a slave trader" and put a hex on Ebert, wishing him colon cancer. Ebert then responded – adapting a statement made by Winston Churchill – that, "although I am fat, one day I will be thin, but Mr. Gallo will still have been the director of The Brown Bunny." In 2003, several media sources later reported that Gallo apologized to Ebert, but Gallo disputed this, saying "I never apologized for anything in my life...The only thing I am sorry about is putting a curse on Roger Ebert's colon. If a fat pig like Roger Ebert doesn't like my movie then I'm sorry for him."

In 2004, Gallo and Ebert appeared to have reconciled, and Ebert ended up giving a thumbs up to a re-edited version of The Brown Bunny. However, in a 2018 article, written after Ebert's death, Gallo accused Ebert's review of the re-edited version as being "far fetched and an outright lie."

Gallo was strongly considered for and almost cast as Uncle Rico in the 2004 film Napoleon Dynamite, though the role ultimately went to Jon Gries.

In 2008, Gallo was cast as the titular character in Francis Ford Coppola's drama film Tetro (2009).

=== 2010s ===
In 2010, Gallo won the Volpi Cup for Best Actor at the 67th Venice International Film Festival for his non-speaking role in Essential Killing. Gallo did not attend the ceremony to accept his award in person, leaving the duty to the film's director Jerzy Skolimowski, who tried to get the actor to reveal himself, leading the audience in a chant of his name. Gallo was not in attendance.

At the festival, Gallo's third feature film, Promises Written in Water, debuted. It was also screened once at the 2010 Toronto International Film Festival. The film received polarized and mostly negative reviews from critics, though several positive reviews cited it as one of the year's greatest films. The film was nominated for the Golden Lion.

Gallo has stated that he has no plans to ever distribute the film and allow it to be seen again, as "I do not want my new works to be generated in a market or audience of any kind." He also added that allowing the film only ever being shown at two screenings was part of a deal he made with Delfine Bafort, who starred in the film. Gallo explained in a 2011 interview that the film would be "allowed to rest in peace, and stored without being exposed to the dark energies from the public." As of 2024, Promises Written in Water is not available to watch, and has not been screened since 2010.

During the Venice festival, Gallo also released a short film, titled The Agent, which was nominated for Best Short Film. The Agent starred Sage Stallone, and has also only ever been screened twice, with Gallo having no plans to re-release it to the public.

In 2012, Gallo starred in Davide Manuli's The Legend of Kaspar Hauser, a modern-western interpretation of the German legend of Kaspar Hauser which premiered at the International Film Festival Rotterdam. Gallo plays the two largest roles in the film, the English-speaking Sheriff and the Italian-speaking assassin. Later that year, he appeared in a cameo role in Julie Delpy's 2 Days in New York. In the film, Gallo appears as a Mephistopheles-like version of himself, who purchases the protagonist's (Delpy) soul, after she puts it up for auction. Delpy wrote the role with Gallo specifically in mind, who agreed to the part after reading the screenplay.

In 2013, Gallo's website listed that he had directed, written, produced, and acted in his fourth feature film, April. It states that the film is 88 minutes long, stars Gallo as the lead character Seth Goldstone, and co-stars pornographic actor Jamie Gillis. The film has never been released, leading to speculation about the nature of the project. That year, Gallo also co-starred with Kōichi Satō and Yoo Ji-tae in Junji Sakamoto's film, Human Trust.

=== 2020s ===
In 2022, Gallo appeared in D. J. Caruso's thriller film Shut In. Released by The Daily Wire, Shut In marked Gallo's first acting role since 2013.

In January 2024, it was revealed that Gallo was set to portray Joseph James DeAngelo in The Policeman. He was accused of being abusive and sexually inappropriate with 3 actresses auditioning for the film. In May 2025, Lionsgate Films obtained the film, which was also retitled to Golden State Killer. Speculation also emerged that the film may have been directed and written by Gallo himself, using a pseudonym. In September 2026, Venice Film Festival director Alberto Barbera revealed that Golden State Killer was going to have its premiere at the festival out-of-competition, but that Gallo refused due to him wanting to compete for the Golden Lion.

In April 2025, Variety initially reported that Gallo would co-star with Karla Sofía Gascón in The Life Lift, a psychological thriller directed by Stefania Rossella Grassi. In May, Gallo told Entertainment Weekly that he had only been approached, and has not been signed onto the film, alleging that the filmmakers leaked a "false rumor" to obtain financing.

== Music and modeling career ==
=== Music ===
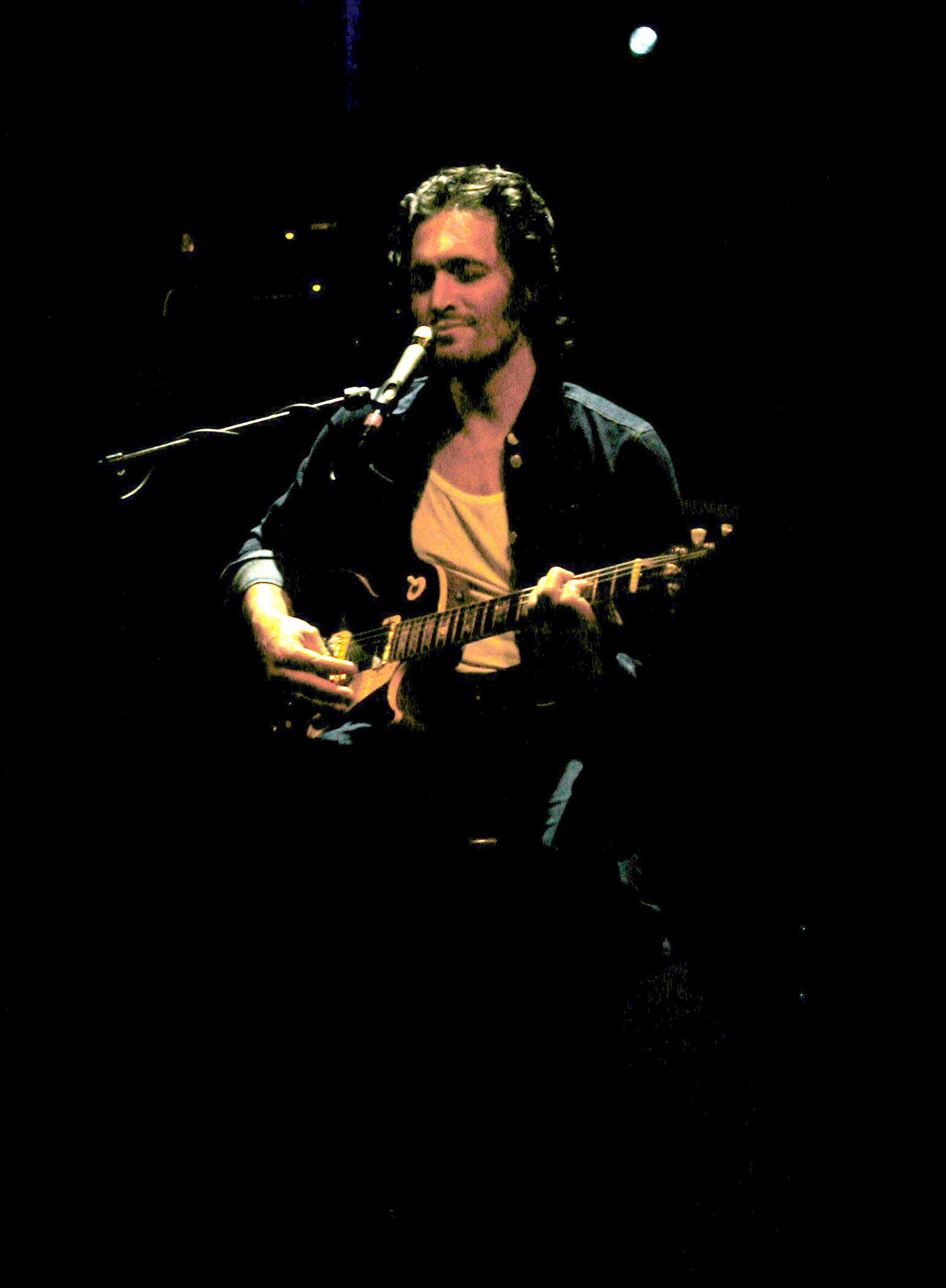
Gallo performing in 2005

Gallo played electric bass and sang in the mid-1970s in several adolescent garage bands such as Blue Mood; a progressive rock cover band named Zephyr (not to be confused with the late 1960s band of the same name, or the 1980s Johnny Goudie-fronted band of the same name) which did one performance at Lincoln Park, Tonawanda, New York in 1978; The Good (with Bernie Kugel and Larry Galanowitz); The Detours; and the Plastics. At the age of 16, Gallo moved to New York City and was a later member of the band Gray, with visual artist Jean-Michel Basquiat. Gray played at clubs such as Max's Kansas City, CBGB's, Hurrahs, and the Mudd Club. A few of Gray's recordings appear on the soundtrack for the film Downtown 81.

In 1984, Gallo (using the name "Prince Vince") also appeared as a dancer on an unsold TV pilot for a hip-hop dance show called Graffiti Rock.

Gallo played in a band called Bohack, which recorded an album entitled It Took Several Wives. When Bohack disbanded, Gallo turned his attention to acting, directing, and composing in films. He wrote songs for the soundtrack of the 1998 film Buffalo 66. He played in a rock band with Lukas Haas called Bunny, and Gallo put out his own album which he wrote, performed and produced under Warp Records, titled When. In 2006, Gallo formed the band RRIICCEE with musician Eric Erlandson of Hole.

On August 3, 2013, Vincent Gallo headlined the 3rd Annual San Frandelic Summer Fest in San Francisco.

Gallo directed music videos for the songs "Going Inside" by John Frusciante, and "Anemone" by L'Arc-en-Ciel. He also starred in the music videos for "Bitter" by Lit, "Cosmopolitan Bloodloss" by Glassjaw, and "Grounded" by My Vitriol.

In January 2025, Gallo's new album, Butterfly, was released; Gallo co-created the album with musician Harper Simon. Gallo claims that the album was originally recorded in 2021, but had its release cancelled by Because Music due to his political views. Gallo's self-owned label, Family Friend Records, later purchased the rights to the album and finalized its release.

=== Modeling ===
In 1990, Gallo modeled for Calvin Klein. In 2007, Gallo modeled for Stefano Pilati's menswear campaign, and was also photographed for Supreme. In 2009, Gallo appeared as a model in H&M Spring Collection alongside Eva Herzigova. He later did a fashion campaign and photo shoot with G-Star Raw jeans in Fall 2011. In 2017, Gallo modeled glasses for Persol in their Spring/Summer campaign. From 2017 through 2018, Gallo also appeared as a model, photographed in black-and-white, in the Saint Laurent SS18 campaign.

Additionally, Gallo has stated that he once walked in a fashion show for designer Anna Sui, but left her disappointed by his performance, and was never hired by Sui again.

== Personal life ==
Gallo resides in Arizona as of 2022. He moved to the state in September 2018, when he purchased a $3.25 million mansion in the Catalina Foothills area near Tucson; the home, located on 3.5 acres in a gated community, was built in 2007 from a design by the architect Rick Joy. The same month, Gallo had sold two condominium units located within the same building in the Arts District neighborhood of downtown Los Angeles. He previously owned two Los Angeles houses designed by modernist architect John Lautner: the Garcia House and the Wolff House. He also previously owned a condo at Trump Tower (purchased in 2019 and sold in 2022), as well as apartments in buildings designed by Jean Nouvel and Richard Meier. Gallo is a teetotaler. He is a collector of vinyl records and pre-war sound equipment.

Gallo has said that he once lived in author William S. Burroughs's house for six months. Gallo also knew poet John Giorno, who lived with Burroughs at the time. Throughout their lives, Burroughs and Gallo exchanged postcards, letters, and mixtapes. Ohio State University holds one of Gallo's letters to Burroughs among its archival collection.

In 1984, Gallo was married to a woman for just 10 weeks, before their relationship ended. Gallo has held close friendships with musician Johnny Ramone (prior to Ramone's death in 2004), musician John Frusciante, and actress Milla Jovovich.

On May 24, 2001, Gallo successfully sued actor John Ventimiglia for assault and battery. The New York Supreme Court decided the case in Gallo's favor in Gallo v. Ventimiglia (2001).

Gallo has garnered infamy for making incendiary and provocative comments. When once asked by an interviewer if he was Jewish, Gallo replied, "No, I do not have the Jew gene." On his website, Gallo offers himself as an escort to women for $50,000; and sells his sperm for $1,000,000. His website has been labeled as satirical by media outlets such as The Daily Wire, and has drawn the scorn of other outlets, such as The Guardian. Gallo has stated in interviews that his website and provocative statements are intended to be humorous, and has mocked critics who have interpreted them as serious.

=== Politics ===
A lot of people think of me as homophobic, a racist, a sexist, a nationalist, a Bush lover, a Nixon lover. The truth is, I'm reactive against protest, because I think protest comes from ego. The ugliest sound I ever heard in my life was coming from an anti-war protest. The most angry, bitter voices, I ever heard in my fucking life ... You give more attention to inequality by protest.

— Gallo, interview in Lodown Magazine (2009)

Gallo is a lifelong Republican and a conservative. He holds anti-abortion, anti-drug, and anti-pornography views. Gallo once authored an anti-abortion opinion piece in BlackBook.

Gallo is a fan of U.S. President Richard Nixon, describing him as an "intellectual". Gallo claims to have met Nixon when he was six years old.

In 2004, Gallo appeared in the documentary, Rated R: Republicans in Hollywood, discussing the political discrimination he has faced in the film industry as a conservative. He also spoke at the Women's National Republican Club, where he expressed his support for President George W. Bush, saying that "you know the United States has a great President...when the French hate him!" Later that year, Gallo also met Barbara Bush and Lauren Bush, attending a fashion show alongside them.

In 2018, Gallo expressed his support for President Donald Trump, writing that he is "extremely proud [Trump] is the American President." In 2022, he also praised then-Democratic Senator Kyrsten Sinema as an "open minded and thoughtful" politician, who "adds productive ideological diversity and balance to our beautiful country"; and donated $250 to the campaign of Republican Representative Juan Ciscomani.

In August 2024, Gallo met Trump and endorsed him in the 2024 presidential election; while calling Trump "the greatest president the USA has ever produced."

=== Views on film and music ===
In 2009, Gallo listed Francis Ford Coppola's The Rain People (1969) as his favorite film. He has cited Warren Beatty as one of his favorite actors, as well as his "idol".

In a 1998 interview with Elvis Mitchell, Gallo explained that his taste in films is "hokey". He has listed The Boy in the Plastic Bubble (1976), All Fall Down (1962), Lilith (1964), Mickey One (1965), The Ravine (1969), The Only Game in Town (1970), The Panic in Needle Park (1971), The Gambler (1974), The Death of Richie (1977), The Beyond (1981), and Deuce Bigalow: Male Gigolo (1999) among his favorite films. In his interview with Mitchell, Gallo also stated that his films are heavily inspired by music, describing Buffalo '66 as a "pure musical." Gallo has also expressed a preference for mixing his films with a mono audio track, as opposed to surround sound.

Although a member, Gallo has expressed disdain for the Screen Actors Guild, calling them "a self-serving union that has never had the best intentions of its membership in mind".

Gallo has cited King Crimson's In the Court of the Crimson King as his favorite album. He used the album's track "Moonchild" during a dance sequence in his film Buffalo '66. He has also called the Ramones the greatest band of all time.

== Public reception ==
Gallo's acting performances have received generally positive reviews from film critics. Nathan Rabin of The A.V. Club praised Gallo's performance in Freeway II: Confessions of a Trickbaby as "ever-eccentric" and "profound". Film critic Roger Ebert frequently praised Gallo's performances, including those in The Brown Bunny (2004), Tetro (2009), Essential Killing (2010), and 2 Days in New York (2012). Gallo's performance in Shut In (2022) was singled out and praised by Cath Clarke of The Guardian and John Semley of The New Republic, who gave the film itself negative reviews.

Gallo's directorial work has received more polarized reception from critics. Buffalo '66 (1998) received generally positive reviews from critics, and was praised by Ebert, Elvis Mitchell, and Andrew Johnston. Conversely, The Brown Bunny (2004) received mixed reviews. Ebert described the initial 119-minute festival cut of the film as the worst film in the history of Cannes, though later praised the 93-minute cut of the film, awarding it 3/4 stars. Moria McDonald of The Seattle Times gave the film a negative review, calling it a "self-indulgent and seemingly endless road movie". Manohla Dargis gave the film a mixed review, describing it as "Neither an atrocity nor a revelation". Promises Written in Water (2010) received mostly negative reviews, including from Leslie Felperin of Variety, Deborah Young of The Hollywood Reporter, and Xan Brooks of The Guardian. It received a mixed review from Scott Tobias of The A.V. Club, and a positive one from Truls Lie of Modern Times Review.

In 2010, Empire listed Buffalo '66 (1998) as the 36th-greatest independent film ever made, calling it a "mini masterpiece". French cinema magazine Les Cahiers du Cinéma voted The Brown Bunny (2004) one of the ten best films of the year; while The Daily Telegraph listed it as one of the 100 "defining" films of the decade. Film Comment also included it among the best unreleased films of 2003, ranking it 14th.

The Brown Bunny (2004) has been praised by Josh Safdie, and Claire Denis. Promises Written in Water (2010) was hailed as one of the greatest films of the decade by cinematographer Sean Price Williams. Actor Robert Pattinson has also cited Gallo's performance in Arizona Dream (1993) as influential on his career.

Filmmaker Francis Ford Coppola stated that he was warned against working with Gallo, with many in the film industry describing Gallo as "a nightmare." Nonetheless, Coppola chose to cast Gallo in Tetro (2009), and said that he found Gallo "was very intelligent and a pleasure to work with." Filmmaker Jerzy Skolimowski praised Gallo's performances and described him as a method actor, but stated that he was difficult to direct and prone to anger. Filmmaker Josh Safdie has also said that Gallo is "a genius. One of the smartest people I’ve ever met and known – funniest too"; while filmmaker Caveh Zahedi has written that Gallo is "one of the most talented directors of his generation". Additionally, actor Kevin Corrigan has described Gallo as "really funny", while actresses Julie Delpy and Courteney Cox have all spoken positively about their experiences working alongside Gallo. Actor Alden Ehrenreich has also praised Gallo as "fascinating". Conversely, actress Christina Ricci described her experience with Gallo as "working with a crazy lunatic man", and vowed to never work with him again.

Entertainment Weekly has described Gallo as "rapturous, hilarious, and notoriously acerbic", while The Independent has written that "Gallo may have an ego the size of a hot-air balloon, but even an hour in his company is wildly entertaining." The Guardian has called him a "narcissistic, fantastic director" and said that Gallo "has a reputation as not only one of the most paranoid, controlling men in movies, but also one of the funniest." The Austin Chronicle has written that Gallo is "Equally detested and adored". In 2011, GQ included Gallo on their list of The 25 Most Stylish Directors of All Time.

Among the general public, Gallo possesses a cult following, mostly relating to his films Buffalo '66 (1998) and The Brown Bunny (2004). Gallo's cult following remains especially popular in Japan, having begun shortly after Buffalo '66 was released in the country in 1999. The Hara Museum of Contemporary Art in Japan featured a survey of Gallo's art, titled the Vincent Gallo Retrospective 1977-2002, holding roughly 120 paintings, drawings and photographs by Gallo; prior to its closure in 2021.

=== In other media ===
Gallo's popularity has led to him appearing or being referenced in several songs, video games, manga comics, and anime films.

- In Cat Power's 1995 debut album, Dear Sir, one track is named after him, titled "Mr. Gallo".
- In the 2001 Japanese anime film Cowboy Bebop: The Movie, Gallo visually served as the primary inspiration for the film's antagonist, Vincent Volaju.
- In the 2003 Japanese video game Silent Hill 3, the character Vincent Smith had his name and "unshaven look" inspired by Gallo.
- In the 2011 Japanese video game Catherine, the game's protagonist, Vincent Brooks, is loosely based on Gallo as he appeared in Buffalo '66.
- In the 2017 single "Pretty", by Coco & Clair Clair, Gallo is referenced.

== Filmography ==
=== Feature films ===
Key
| † | Denotes films that have not yet been released |

| Year | Title | Writer | Director | Producer | Editor | Composer | Notes |
|---|---|---|---|---|---|---|---|
| 1998 | Buffalo 66 | Yes | Yes | No | No | Yes | Also story and uncredited cinematographer |
| 2003 | The Brown Bunny | Yes | Yes | Yes | Yes | Uncredited | Also cinematographer, set designer, production designer, costume designer, set decorator, makeup artist, art director, and camera operator |
| 2010 | Promises Written in Water | Yes | Yes | Yes | Yes | Yes | Also art director; unreleased |
| 2013 | April | Yes | Yes | Yes | Yes | Yes | Unreleased |
| TBA | Golden State Killer † | Yes | Yes | No | No | Yes | Upcoming film |

Acting performances

| Year | Title | Role | Notes |
|---|---|---|---|
| 1985 | The Way It Is | Victor / Heurtebise | |
| 1988 | Doc's Kingdom | Jimmy | |
| 1990 | Goodfellas | Henry's '70s Crew #3 | |
| 1991 | A Idade Maior | Mario a.k.a. Alex | |
| 1993 | Arizona Dream | Paul Leger | |
| 1993 | The House of the Spirits | Esteban Garcia | |
| 1995 | Angela | Preacher | |
| 1995 | The Perez Family | Orlando | |
| 1995 | Palookaville | Russell Pataki | |
| 1996 | Nénette and Boni | Vincenzo Brown | |
| 1996 | Basquiat | Party Guest | Uncredited |
| 1996 | The Funeral | Johnny | |
| 1997 | Truth or Consequences, NM | Raymond Lembecke | |
| 1998 | Buffalo '66 | Billy Brown | |
| 1998 | Johnny 316 | Johnny | |
| 1998 | Goodbye Lover | Mike | Uncredited |
| 1998 | L.A. Without a Map | Moss | |
| 1999 | Freeway II: Confessions of a Trickbaby | Sister Gomez | |
| 2000 | Hide and Seek | Frank | |
| 2001 | Trouble Every Day | Shane Brown | |
| 2001 | Stranded | Luca Baglioni | |
| 2001 | Get Well Soon | Bobby Bishop / Kevin Moss | |
| 2003 | The Brown Bunny | Bud Clay | |
| 2003 | Gli indesiderabili | Antonino 'Tony' Bendando | |
| 2006 | Moscow Zero | Owen | |
| 2007 | Oliviero Rising | Oliviero Olivieri | |
| 2009 | Tetro | Angelo 'Tetro' Tetrocini | |
| 2009 | Metropia | Roger Olofsson | Voice role |
| 2010 | Essential Killing | Mohammed | |
| 2010 | Promises Written in Water | Kevin | |
| 2011 | Loosies | Jax | |
| 2012 | The Legend of Kaspar Hauser | Pusher / Sheriff | |
| 2012 | Two Days in New York | Himself | Uncredited |
| 2013 | Human Trust | Harold Marcus | |
| 2022 | Shut In | Sammy | |
| TBA | Golden State Killer † | Joseph James DeAngelo | Upcoming film |

=== Television ===
| Year | Title | Role | Notes |
|---|---|---|---|
| 1984 | Graffiti Rock | Dancer | Pilot |
| 1987 | Crime Story | Charlie Riccio | Episode: "Ground Zero" |
| 1989 | The Equalizer | Tony Santiago | Episode: "Heart of Justice" |
| 1994 | Tous les garçons et les filles de leur âge... | Captain Brown | Episode: "U.S. Go Home" |
| 2002 | The Groovenians | Nixon | Pilot; Voice role |
| 2004 | Rated R: Republicans in Hollywood | Himself | Television documentary film |
| 2007 | Dirt | Sammy Winter | Episode: "This Is Not Your Father's Hostage Situation" |

=== Short films ===
| Year | Title | Director | Actor | Notes |
|---|---|---|---|---|
| 1979 | A Vincent Gallo as Jesus Christ | No | Yes | Directed by Michael Holman |
| 1980 | If You Feel Froggy, Jump | Yes | Yes | |
| 1984 | Too Many Fish | No | Yes | Directed by Michael Holman |
| 1984 | Gaslight LeStat | No | Yes | Directed by Michael Holman |
| 1986 | The Gun Lover | Yes | Yes | |
| 1986 | Wedding | Yes | Yes | |
| 1988 | That Smell | Yes | Yes | |
| 1989 | Gallo 2000 | Yes | Yes | |
| 1991 | Keep It for Yourself | No | Yes | |
| 1993 | The Hanging | No | Yes | Directed by Victoria Leacock |
| 1994 | U.S. Go Home | No | Yes | Directed by Claire Denis |
| 1994 | Casting Director Billy Hopkins Leaves a Message for Vincent Gallo | Yes | Yes | |
| 1997 | Buffalo 66 Trailer | Yes | Yes | Included on the 2014 Lionsgate Blu-ray release of Buffalo '66 |
| 1997 | Vincent Gallo Directs | Yes | Yes | |
| 1997 | Vincent Gallo Has a Thing or Two to Say About the British | Yes | Yes | |
| 1997 | Looking for Enemies Finding Friends | Yes | Yes | Described as a "self-portrait of Vincent Gallo NYC 1997" |
| 1999 | Live Love Drive | Yes | Yes | |
| 2000 | Anemone | Yes | No | |
| 2001 | Honey Bunny | Yes | Yes | |
| 2001 | John Frusciante Plays and Sings | Yes | No | |
| 2003 | The Brown Bunny Trailers | Yes | Yes | Included on the 2005 Sony DVD release of The Brown Bunny |
| 2003 | The Curse of Manuel Chiche | Yes | Yes | |
| 2004 | Vincent Gallo vs Sonic Youth | No | Yes | Directed by Chris Habib |
| 2004 | Akiko | Yes | No | |
| 2009 | 1989 | No | Yes | Directed by Camilo Matiz |
| 2010 | Anea 17 | Yes | No | |
| 2010 | The Agent | Yes | Yes | |
| 2014 | United States Wins the World Cup | Yes | No | |

=== Music videos ===
| Year | Artist | Song | Director | Appearance |
|---|---|---|---|---|
| 1996 | Lit | "Bitter" | No | Yes |
| 2001 | My Vitriol | "Grounded" | No | Yes |
| 2001 | John Frusciante | "Going Inside" | Yes | No |
| 2001 | L'Arc-en-Ciel | "Anemone" | Yes | No |
| 2002 | Glassjaw | "Cosmopolitan Bloodloss" | No | Yes |
| 2004 | Jay-Z | "99 Problems" | No | Yes |

== Discography ==
=== Albums ===
- It Took Several Wives (1982, Family Friend Records) as Bohack
- The Way It Is Soundtrack (1984, Rojo Records)
- Buffalo '66 Soundtrack (1998, Will Records)
- When (2001, Warp Records)
- Recordings of Music for Film (2002, Warp Records)
- Butterfly (2025, Family Friend Records) (with Harper Simon)

=== EPs ===
- So Sad (2001, Warp Records)

=== Singles ===
- Honey Bunny (2001, Warp Records)

== Bibliography ==
- Vincent Gallo: Paintings and Drawings, 1982-1988. Kyoto, Japan: Kyoto Shoin. 1989. ISBN 978-4763685230. OCLC 21964055.
- Vincent Gallo 1962-1999. Osaka, Japan: Petit Grand Publishing, Inc. 1999. ISBN 978-4309903538. OCLC 52101992.
- Live, Love, Drive: Photographs By Vincent Gallo. Japan: Little More. 1999. ISBN 978-4898150092.
- "Vincent Gallo (Open Letter)". Another Man. No. 26. September 27, 2018.

=== Illustration ===
- Pavloff, Franck (December 2003). Brown Morning (Japanese ed.). 大月書店. ISBN 9784272600472.

== Awards and nominations ==
| Year | Award | Category | Recipient | Result | Ref. |
|---|---|---|---|---|---|
| 1998 | Deauville Film Festival | Grand Special Prize | Buffalo '66 | Nominated | |
| 1998 | Gijón International Film Festival | Special Prize of the Young Jury | Buffalo '66 | Won | |
| 1998 | Gijón International Film Festival | Grand Prix Asturias | Buffalo '66 | Nominated | |
| 1998 | Gotham Awards | Open Palm Award | Buffalo '66 | Nominated | |
| 1998 | National Board of Review | Special recognition | Buffalo '66 | Won | |
| 1998 | New York Film Critics Circle | Best First Film | Buffalo '66 | Nominated | |
| 1998 | Stockholm International Film Festival | Bronze Horse: Best Film | Buffalo '66 | Nominated | |
| 1998 | Sundance Film Festival | Dramatic Competition | Buffalo '66 | Nominated | |
| 1999 | British Independent Film Awards | Best Foreign Independent Film - English Language | Buffalo '66 | Nominated | |
| 1999 | Golden Trailer Awards | Best Art and Commerce | Buffalo '66 | Nominated | |
| 1999 | Independent Spirit Awards | Best First Feature | Buffalo '66 | Nominated | |
| 1999 | International Film Festival Rotterdam | Moviezone Award | Buffalo '66 | Won | |
| 2002 | Fantafestival | Best Actor | Stranded | Won | |
| 2003 | Cannes Film Festival | Palme d'Or | The Brown Bunny | Nominated | |
| 2003 | Thessaloniki International Film Festival | Golden Alexander | The Brown Bunny | Nominated | |
| 2003 | Vienna International Film Festival | FIPRESCI Prize | The Brown Bunny | Won | |
| 2003 | Village Voice Film Poll | Best Undistributed Film | The Brown Bunny | Nominated | |
| 2004 | Cahiers du Cinéma | Top Ten Film Award | The Brown Bunny | Sixth place; tied | |
| 2010 | Mar del Plata International Film Festival | Best Actor | Essential Killing | Won | |
| 2010 | Venice Film Festival | Best Actor | Essential Killing | Won | |
| 2010 | Venice Film Festival | Golden Lion | Promises Written in Water | Nominated | |
| 2010 | Venice Film Festival | Best Short Film | The Agent | Nominated | |
| 2011 | Polish Film Award | Best Actor | Essential Killing | Nominated | |
