= You Go to My Head (disambiguation) =

You Go to My Head is a 1938 song.

You Go to My Head may also refer to:

== Albums ==
- You Go to My Head (album), a 1956 album by Patti Page
- You Go to My Head, a 1957 album by Billy Daniels
- You Go to My Head, a compilation album by Billie Holiday
- Set One: You Go to My Head, a 2005 album by David McAlmont
- You Go to My Head, a 2012 album by Malene Mortensen
- You Go to My Head, a 2000 album by Doug Raney

== Other uses ==
- You Go to My Head (film), 2017 romantic thriller film by Dimitri de Clercq
