= Golden State Killer (film) =

- Directed by: Vincent Gallo (Note: Under the pseudonym "Vito Brown".)
- Written by: Vincent Gallo (Note: Under the pseudonym "Vito Brown".)
- Produced by: Jordan Gertner; Scott Clayton; Barry Brooker; Todd Williams; Gary A. Hirsch
- Starring: Vincent Gallo; James Franco; Ted Rooney
- Cinematography: Peter Buntaine
- Edited by: Scott Gray
- Music by: Vincent Gallo
- Production company: Pacific Media
- Distributed by: Lionsgate
- Country: United States
- Language: English

Golden State Killer is an upcoming American crime thriller film pseudonymously written and directed by Vincent Gallo under the name "Vito Brown". It stars Gallo as American serial killer Joseph James DeAngelo, popularly known as the Golden State Killer, alongside James Franco and Ted Rooney.

== Cast ==
- Vincent Gallo as Joseph James DeAngelo
- James Franco as a police detective
- Ted Rooney as Dr. Reyes

== Production ==
=== Development ===
In January 2024, it was revealed that Vincent Gallo was set to appear alongside James Franco in Jordan Gertner's upcoming film The Policeman, where Gallo would portray serial killer and rapist Joseph James DeAngelo. Gertner had previously served as a co-producer on Gallos directorial debut Buffalo '66 (1998).

It marks Gallo's first Hollywood production since Tetro (2009), and Franco's first since The Ballad of Buster Scruggs (2018), although both actors had been working sporadically with European filmmakers, and other Non-Hollywood productions.

=== Filming ===
Principal photography took place in Portland, and post-production started in late 2024.

In October 2024, Franco stated that he was unsure of when The Policeman would release, noting that "there is fighting over the cut". In 2025, Variety reported that Gertner was no longer attached to the film as writer-director, only a producer; the film was instead being directed and written by Vito Brown.

Several media outlets speculated that "Vito Brown" is a pseudonym for Gallo himself. Leonard Pearce of TheFilmStage noted that Gallo once portrayed a character named Vito Brown in Keep It for Yourself (1991); Gallo has also portrayed other similarly named characters including Billy Brown in Buffalo '66 (1998), Vincenzo Brown in Nénette and Boni (1996), Shane Brown in Trouble Every Day (2001), and Captain Brown in US Go Home (1994); while also directing The Brown Bunny (2003).

=== Controversies ===
After filming, reports emerged that Gallo was anonymously accused by two actresses, who do not star in the film, of making lewd comments during auditions. Their allegation promoted an investigation by the Screen Actors Guild, who monitored the film's production. Gertner and the film's production company, Pacific Media Productions, both issued a statement in defense of Gallo. Their statement said that an intimacy coordinator was utilized during filming and that "the production of the picture was carried out in a safe, protective and respectful environment"; while adding that the film's cast and crew are "proud of the movie we have made."

== Release ==
In May 2025, Lionsgate Films obtained domestic distribution rights to the film, through Grindstone Entertainment. The film was also retitled to Golden State Killer. In September 2026, it was reported that the Venice Film Festival had offered to show Golden State Killer out-of-competition, but that Gallo had turned down the offer as he was hoping to compete for the festival's Golden Lion.
