= NYCB =

NYCB may refer to:

- New York City Ballet, a ballet company
- New York Community Bank, a regional bank
- New York City Breakers, a breakdancing group
