= The Legend of Kaspar Hauser =

- Film poster
- Italian: La leggenda di Kaspar Hauser
- Directed by: Davide Manuli
- Written by: Davide Manuli
- Produced by: Alessandro Bonifazi; Davide Manuli; Bruno Tribbioli
- Starring: Vincent Gallo; Claudia Gerini; Elisa Sednaoui; Fabrizio Gifuni; Silvia Calderoni
- Cinematography: Tarek Ben Abdallah
- Edited by: Rosella Mocci
- Music by: Vitalic
- Release date: 30 January 2012
- Running time: 95 minutes
- Country: Italy
- Languages: English & Italian

The Legend of Kaspar Hauser (Italian: La leggenda di Kaspar Hauser) is a 2012 Italian drama film written and directed by Davide Manuli, based on "the legend" of Kaspar Hauser. In this modern western-like re-interpretation featuring Vincent Gallo, a music-obsessive Kaspar washes up on a Mediterranean beach, where half a dozen protagonists try to make sense of who he is.

The film premiered at the 2012 Rotterdam International Film Festival. It won San Francisco IndieFest's Jury Prize for Best Narrative Feature.

== Plot ==
Vincent Gallo takes on a dual role in this Italian adaptation of the Kaspar Hauser legend. Kaspar, a mysterious youth who surfaced in Nuremberg in 1828 with limited speech abilities, remains an enigma with unexplained royal ties. In this surreal rendition by director Davide Manuli, Kaspar, clad in tracksuit and headphones, washes ashore on a nearly deserted island. There, he is anointed as the messiah by The Sheriff (Gallo), a DJ ruling over the sparse community. The Duchess, the community's sovereign, perceives the blonde youth as a threat and dispatches The Pusher (also played by Gallo) to rectify the situation. The narrative unfolds through concise chapters, each presented as a single, extended shot, featuring minimal yet surreal dialogues that illuminate Hauser's tale. Set against the stark backdrop of deserted beaches and villages, the film is rendered in black-and-white, underscored by the pulsating rhythms of Vitalic.
