= Michael Holman (filmmaker) =

American artist, writer and musician

Michael Thomas Holman is a New York-based artist, writer, filmmaker and musician. He is also an early 1980s downtown scene subculturalist and creator of the Hip Hop music program Graffiti Rock. Holman is a founding member, along with Jean-Michel Basquiat, of the experimental band Gray.

In 2016, Holman's archives were acquired by the New York Public Library for the Performing Arts at Lincoln Center. Additional Holman artifacts were acquired by the National Museum of African American History and Culture. Holman has performed his Confessions Of A Subculturalist spoken word performance at the Bruno Walter Auditorium in Lincoln Center, and his sound and video The Subjective Gaze, Parts 1&2 performance at New York City's Museum of Modern Art.

Holman wrote and directed Nile Rodgers' We Are Family Foundation 10th Anniversary Gala and the Tommy Boy Music 30th Anniversary Performance at the Montreux Jazz Festival.

== Career ==
Holman received a Bachelor of Economics degree from the University of San Francisco in 1978. He later attended the New York University Graduate School of Film.

While dancing at a disco in northern California, he was recruited into a theatrical rock band called The Tubes.

In May 1978, Holman moved to New York City to work on Wall Street. There he discovered the Fab Five graffiti group and befriended Fab 5 Freddy.

=== Gray band ===
In April 1979, Holman organized the Canal Zone party with Stan Peskett and Fab 5 Freddy, which showcased the talents of the emerging hip hop culture for a downtown audience. At this event Holman met a teenaged Jean-Michel Basquiat, who revealed himself as the elusive SAMO. Together they formed the experimental noise band Gray.

Gray performed at various, historic venues including Hurrah, Mudd Club, CBGB and The ICA in London. They recorded music that appeared in films such as Downtown 81, Basquiat, and Boom, For Real, The Late Teenaged Years of Jean-Michel Basquiat.

In the 1990s, Holman and Nicholas Taylor, another original member of the band Gray, created sonic music performances at clubs such as Club USA, Sybarite, Nuyorican Poets Cafe and The Ritz, where they opened for Todd Rundgren. Gray release their first album, Shades Of... in 2011 on Plush Safe Records. A remastered version of the album with additional remixes was released on Ubiquity Records in 2019, that features the work of producers such as: Todd Rundgren, Hank Shocklee, Deantoni Parks, Mike Tewz and King Britt. Since 2010, Holman and Taylor have re-launched Gray. They first performing at the New Museum in July 2011, then in 2012, the Corcoran Gallery of Art in Washington, D.C. and the Brooklyn Academy of Music with Questlove of The Roots (within Questlove's Shuffle Culture avant-garde show).

=== Film and television ===
Holman made short art films that premiered at The Mudd Club, Tier 3, The Ritz and other music venues.

In 1984, Holman produced and hosted the short-lived hip-hop television show, Graffiti Rock.

Holman earned the "Story Developed by Michael Thomas Holman" credit for the 1996 Miramax feature film Basquiat, directed by Julian Schnabel. He also appeared in the film which depicted the life of his late bandmate Jean-Michel Basquiat.

Holman wrote, produced and directed Children's Television programming for the Nickelodeon Network, specifically Blue's Clues and Eureeka’s Castle.

=== Hip Hop impresario ===
Holman was the third writer to use the term Hip Hop in print (East Village Eye, January 1982) following Robert Flipping (New Pittsburg Courier, Feb. 24, 1979), and Collis Davis (Amsterdam News, Jan. 12, 1980. He had different hip-hop TV shows around 1982, which were performance shows of graffiti artists, DJs, rappers, B-boys and B-girls.

Holman introduced Malcolm McLaren to the music of Afrika Bambaataa and the Zulu Nation band. He also opened for McLaren's protégés Bow Wow Wow in 1981.

Holman created, managed, and choreographed the B-boy dance crew New York City Breakers, and created the first company called Hip hop International Inc in 1983, which toured the world and performed for the likes of President Ronald Reagan and the UK's Prince Andrew.

Holman helped produce and 2nd unit direct the feature film Beat Street (1984). Holman rented Club Negril, a legendary Jamaican reggae club run by Jennifer and Hubert Peters, then created, hosted and produced the first Hip Hop television show in 1984, Graffiti Rock. He later wrote Breaking, a book on Hip Hop Culture for Scribner's Publishing.

His voice has been sampled on the Beastie Boys track Alright Hear This.

In 2000, The Rock & Roll Hall of Fame/Brooklyn Museum show: Roots, Rhymes + Rage: The Hip Hop Story, featured many of Holman's Hip Hop artifacts and writings.

=== Journalism and education ===
As a writer and journalist, Holman has written for the East Village Eye, Artforum and Art Monthly.

Holman taught courses at institutions such as Howard University in Washington, D.C., the Photo Workshops in Maine, and New York City's The New School For Social Research in Manhattan. In 2011, Holman began teaching short film screenwriting at New York's MPS Live Action Short Film Department at the School of Visual Arts and Media Courses at the City College of New York.

As a lecturer on Contemporary Urban Culture and Art, Holman has spoken at various institutions, including The Whitney Museum, the Royal College of Art (London), Cox 18 (Milan), Austin Museum of Art, the Brooklyn Museum, Yale University, NYU, Rice University, the San Francisco Art Institute, Payne Weber Incorporated and RJ Reynolds Incorporated.

=== Fine arts ===
Holman created installation art at the Mudd Club, notably The Soul Party in 1980.

Working as a fine artist, Holman deconstructs social-political symbolism on canvas. His paintings were shown at the Massey/Klein Gallery (2018), and Miami Art Basel in 2007 and 2008, and the Spring Break Show in New York City.

Holman's archives were acquired by the New York Public Library for the Performing Arts, Jerome Robbins Dance Division in 2016. In the same year, a few of Holman's artifacts from the 1980s were acquired by the Smithsonian National Museum of African American History and Culture.

== Accolades ==
Holman received the Paulette Goddard Award, Best Film, NYU, for Head's, You Win, in 1987.

He won the Best Video Of The Year from Rolling Stone Magazine for Run DMC music video Christmas In Hollis in 1987.

Eureeka's Castle won the Cable Industry Ace Award in 1990.

== Filmography ==
- Graffiti Rock (1984)
- New York Beat Movie (1981)
