= Delfine Bafort =

Belgian fashion model and actress

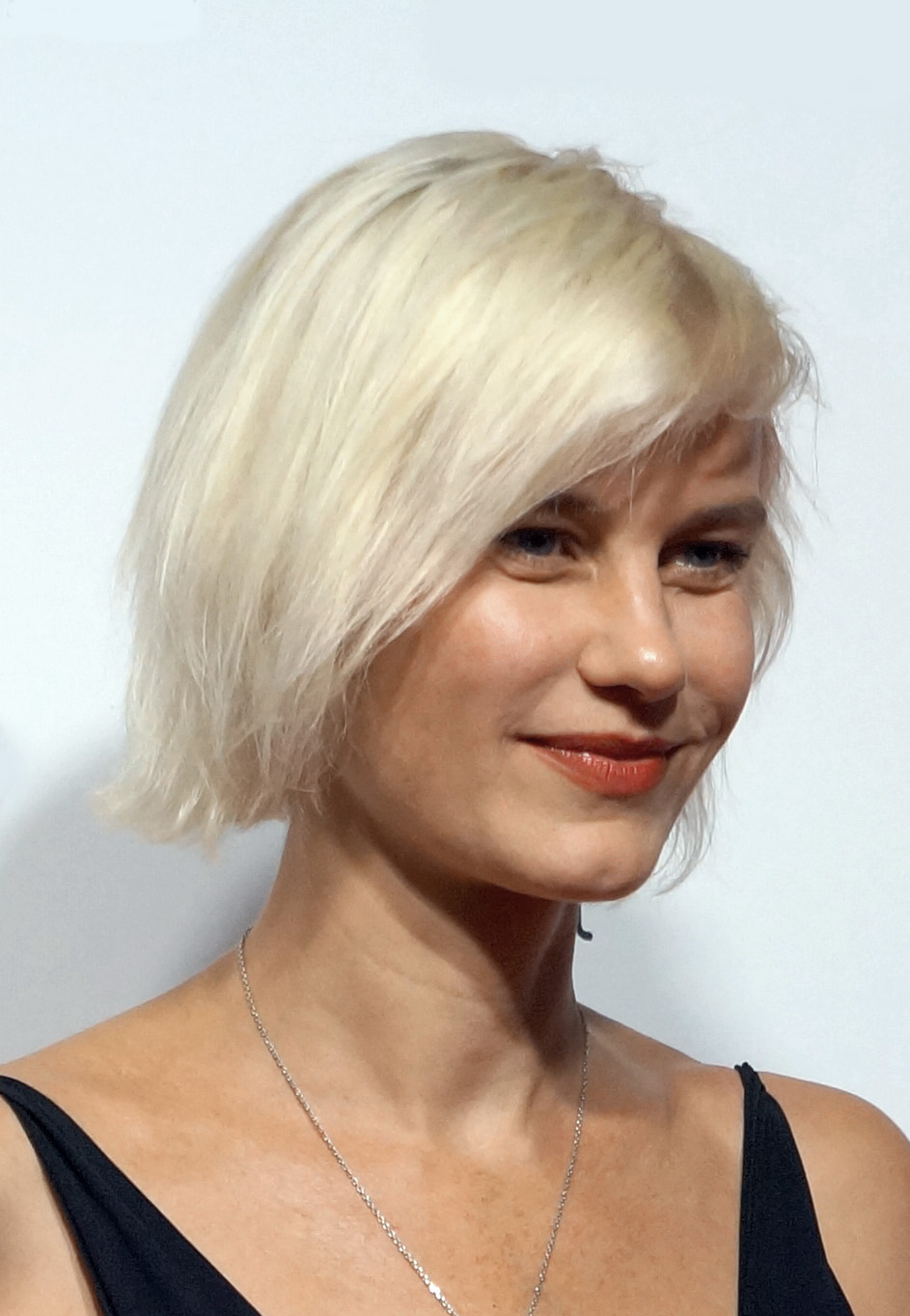
- Bafort in 2019
- Born: 22 May 1979 (age 45)

Delfine Bafort (born 22 May 1979) is a Belgian fashion model and actress.

== Biography ==
Delfine Bafort completed her secondary studies in Free Visual Arts at the Sint-Lucas College in Ghent. At 17 she won a modeling contest, which led to an international modeling career. Since then she has modeled in big fashion shows and was the face of exclusive brands such as Balenciaga, Versace, Dolce & Gabbana, Jean Paul Gaultier, Loewe, Cacharel, Calvin Klein, Moschino, and DKNY. She was on the cover of international magazines such as Vogue, Harper's Bazaar, Marie Claire, Elle and Dazed & Confused.

In 2003 she played the lead female in the cult film Steve + Sky by Felix Van Groeningen, her former boyfriend. In 2005 she passed admissions for the drama program at the Royal Conservatory of Ghent. She also appeared in Old Times by Harold Pinter, along with Gabriel Ríos and Leen Verheyen, which was directed by Mieja Hollevoet.

In 2008 she starred alongside Vincent Gallo in his movie Promises Written in Water, which premiered in September 2010 at the 67th Venice Film Festival and competed for the Golden Lion (Leone d'Oro).

== Filmography ==
Year	Title	Script	Role	Note
2004	Steve + Sky	Felix van Groeningen	Sky	
2005	Looking for Alfred	Johan Grimonprez	-	Short film
2010	Promises Written in Water	Vincent Gallo	Mallory	
2013	Spring Summer	John Lindquist	Caroline	Short film
2016	Love Drifts	Nelson Moens	-	
2016	Dag vreemde man	Anthony Schatteman	Daisy	Short film
2017	Doubleplusungood	Marco Laguna	Eve	
2017	You Go to My Head	Dimitri De Clercq	Dafne/Kitty	
2017	Hoe kamelen leeuwen worden	Lydia Rigaux	Alice	
