= Promises Written in Water =

- Official poster
- Directed by: Vincent Gallo
- Written by: Vincent Gallo
- Produced by: Vincent Gallo
- Starring: Vincent Gallo; Delfine Bafort; Sage Stallone
- Cinematography: Masanobu Takayanagi
- Edited by: Vincent Gallo
- Music by: Vincent Gallo
- Release date: September 7, 2010 (Venice)
- Running time: 75 minutes
- Country: United States
- Language: English

Promises Written in Water is a 2010 experimental drama film written, directed, edited, and produced by Vincent Gallo. The film stars Gallo, alongside Delfine Bafort, Sage Stallone, Lisa Love, and Hope Tomaselli.

The third feature film to be directed by Gallo, it premiered at the Venice Film Festival, alongside his short film The Agent (2010). It was nominated for the Golden Lion.

After just two festival screenings, the film became unavailable for the general public to watch, per Gallo's wishes.

== Synopsis ==
"Kevin is a long-time, professional assassin, specializing in the termination of life. Mallory is a wild, poetic, beautiful young woman confronting her terminal illness and eventual suicide. She reaches out to Kevin to take responsibility for her corpse once she passes, requesting his protection of her dead body’s dignity until her cremation. Kevin’s acceptance of this request causes uncomfortable self-reflection and changes the lens through which he views death."

== Cast ==
- Vincent Gallo as Kevin
- Delfine Bafort as Mallory
- Sage Stallone as The Mafioso
- Lisa Love as Grieving Woman
- Hope Tomaselli as Dead Girl
- Brenda Epperson as Mortician

== Production ==
In April 2010, Kyle Buchanan of Movieline reported that the film had originally begun as an indie production, titled The Funeral Director. According to Buchanan, Gallo, alongside actress Alison Lohman, had signed on to star in the film in 2007. It was to be directed by indie filmmaker Pete Red Sky, who only possessed one other film credit to his name. Before filming, Lohman left the film's production, and Gallo was given a producer credit. Through Gallo's help, the film's cast was filled out with Sage Stallone, Delfine Bafort, and Esther de Jong.

After filming began, Sky was reportedly a passive and inexperienced director, frustrating Gallo. Halfway through production, Gallo called for a meeting with the film's producers and director and presented an ultimatum: threatening to walk unless he was made director. The group agreed and made Gallo director, giving him control over the project. Sky, no longer director, "was left with little to do but follow Gallo around on set." Under Gallo, the film was re-titled Promises Written in Water.

In an interview with Lodown Magazine, Gallo confirmed that he had taken control of the film from Sky, stating:

"I show up on the set and it's ridiculous and I can't take it anymore, and as much as it hurts, I said to Mr Red Sky...I'm so sorry man...You don't know what you're doing. You don't know anything about filmmaking...I wrote him a cheque for $50,000 and moved on."

Gallo, who helped self-finance the finished film, described the film's budget as "a few hundred thousand dollars". Gallo has explained that his goal of the film was "to make choices as if this was the first movie ever made and not to buy into the story of what cinema should be. This means making the film on the hoof, without much in the way of preparation."

== Release ==
The film released at the 67th Venice International Film Festival, premiering In Competition, alongside 21 other films competing for the Golden Lion. The film had two showings, which occurred on September 7 and September 8, 2010. It was one of three films featuring Gallo to premiere at the festival, alongside Gallo's short film The Agent (2010), as well as Jerzy Skolimowski's Essential Killing (2010). Gallo shunned all publicity at Venice, and arrived dressed in a balaclava. He refused to hold a press conference for Promises Written in Water, and did not take the stage to accept his Volpi Cup for Best Actor, which he won for his performance in Essential Killing. Promises Written in Water was later shown at the Toronto International Film Festival on September 15, 2010.

The film has never been screened since the two festivals in 2010, and is now unavailable for the public to watch, per Gallo's wishes. In a 2011 interview, Gallo said the film would be "allowed to rest in peace, and stored without being exposed to the dark energies from the public." However, in an Instagram message from 2020, Gallo told an inquiring fan that "I may show it one day."

== Reception ==
The film was not distributed and received generally poor reviews from critics, while audience reception leaned more positive. Stephanie Zacharek of Movieline reported that at the Venice premiere, the film concluded with both clapping and booing from the audience. Truls Lie of Modern Times Review reported:

"The documentary language of this fiction film splits the audience into two: At the official screening they clapped for five minutes – but at the press screening they started laughing and booing from the start, where Gallo is credited as director and editor, and for the script, music, production and acting. They were noisy throughout the screening, laughter returned, a mob dominated the audience."

Lie also wrote that Gallo's film "saved the festival for me. This eccentric man, known for his roles in several movies, brought to mind works by Warhol and Cassavetes."

Leslie Felperin of Variety called the film "underwhelming" and "a disappointment". Felperin also argued that the film would disappoint both Gallo's fans, who expected a better film, as well as his detractors, who would prove unable to dismiss the film.

Deborah Young of The Hollywood Reporter wrote that the film "is an incomprehensible, disappointing effort in which he (Gallo) receives producing, directing, writing, editing, music and acting credits, so there really is no one else to blame if this story about a man who broods on love and death disappears into the waves almost immediately after its festival outings."

Xan Brooks of The Guardian awarded the film 2/5 stars, opining, "It's only 74 minutes but it feels like forever...But it cannot by rights be regarded as a failure, or even as a joke, because one never has the sense that Gallo has lost control of his material...There is no telling just where it will go, or what it will do next. In the straitjacketed world of narrative film-making, that has to count for something." Scott Tobias of The A.V. Club awarded the film a 'C' rating, writing, "Shooting in gorgeous, low-contrast 16mm B&W, Gallo conducts various experiments in form...The majority of fragments have the feel of a sophisticated but derivative thesis project."

Film critic Michael Sicinski gave the film a positive review, writing that "Promises is without a doubt the most experimental feature film I’ve seen at this year’s festival, and that includes Uncle Boonmee." Sicinski compared the film to Andy Warhol's films Kiss and Chelsea Girls, and added that the film contained a "raucous dance number (set to Polygon Window’s "Quoth")" and "a beautiful nude portrait of Bafort reminiscent of Willard Maas's Geography of the Body."

In 2017, cinematographer Sean Price Williams called it the sixth greatest film of the past ten years, writing:

"I hate that no one can see this film. I swear I have not included it to show off. Every scene in the film is invention. Never seen a better shot of a man pacing a room. Gallo’s face is its richest. Gray and full of stories. It contains a scene in a café where he repeats his lines over and over until he gets them right. The most simple fantasy of a person who knows he can never truly express himself as he wants to. It’s painful and playful as no one has the nerve to be. Humiliating and human in a way we are not allowed to be, especially on a screen. Still?"

In 2024, Williams praised the film again, saying that "it’s a movie that’s always in my head".

== Award ==
Year	Award	Category	Result
2010	Venice Film Festival	Golden Lion	Nominated
