= Sidney Duteil =

French musician

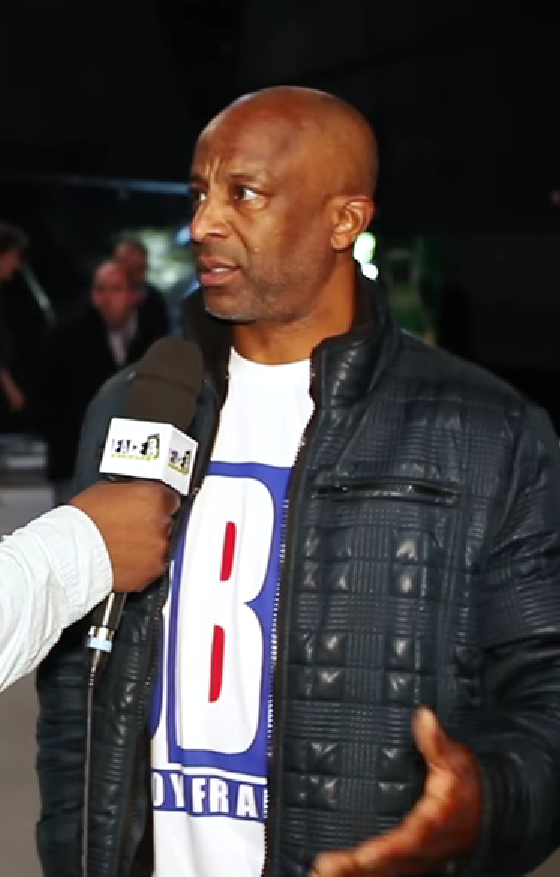
Duteil in 2015.

Sidney Duteil (born Patrick Duteil in 1955), better known as Sidney, is a French musician, rapper, DJ, television and radio host, and occasional actor of Guadeloupean origin.

Duteil was born in Argenteuil, Val-d'Oise. He is well known in France for his connection with the beginnings of the French hip hop scene. He presented a hip hop radio program on Radio 7 starting in 1982. In 1984, he was the host of the popular weekly French Rap television show entitled H.I.P. H.O.P. This was significant for two reasons: first because Duteil became the first Black man in France to hold such a position, and secondly because the birth and eventual popularity of the weekly show demonstrated the growing admiration and involvement in the French population in hip hop culture.

In 1990, Sidney collaborated with David Guetta in his early career to release "Nation Rap."
