= The Agent (2010 film) =

- Official poster
- Directed by: Vincent Gallo
- Written by: Vincent Gallo
- Starring: Vincent Gallo; Sage Stallone
- Edited by: Vincent Gallo
- Music by: Vincent Gallo
- Release date: September 10, 2010 (Venice)
- Running time: 13 minutes
- Country: United States
- Language: English

The Agent is a 2010 short film written, directed, edited, and produced by Vincent Gallo. It stars Gallo and Sage Stallone, in Stallone's final film role prior to his death.

== Synopsis ==
"Sage Stallone stars as talent agent Ari Sheinwold. Vincent Gallo plays Sheinwold’s top client Vincent Gallo. Gallo appears one day for a meeting with his agent Sheinwold, which begins with some good news. When Sheinwold does not receive the response he expects from Gallo after telling him the “good news”, the agent begins to reveal his true nature."

== Cast ==
- Vincent Gallo as himself
- Sage Stallone as Ari Sheinwold
- Lindsay Taylor as The Receptionist

== Production and release ==
The Agent was filmed in Los Angeles on black and white film stock. Gallo has described it as a "highly conceptual, stripped down" film "that may not entertain many."

The film premiered at the 67th Venice International Film Festival, along with Gallo's third film Promises Written in Water, followed a screening at the Toronto Film Festival. The film has not been screened again or seen by the public since, per Gallo's wishes.

According to The Guardian, the film consists of Sheinwold yelling at a mostly off-camera Gallo for the majority of its runtime, shouting "You're a prick, you're a fucking prick", among other insults.

The film also ends with a two-minute end-title disclaimer reading, "This film was brought to you by The Gray Daisy Foundation, a viewer-supported organization dedicated to the advancement of outspoken Caucasian non-Jewish heterosexual good-looking male film-makers and movie stars" which “needs your support to continue bringing you high-quality films.” The disclaimer was described positively by IndieWire as a belabored punch line.

== Reception ==
The film was nominated for Best Short Film, under the Orizzonti category, at the 67th Venice Film Festival.

Bryce J. Renninger of IndieWire gave the film a positive review, describing it as a "companion-piece of sorts" to Promises Written in Water, while complimenting its "provocation and its aesthetic".
