= Gabriele Corcos =

Italian celebrity cook, entrepreneur, and television personality

- Born: October 7, 1972 (age 54); Fiesole, Italy
- Spouse: Debi Mazar (m. 2002)
- Children: 2
- Culinary career
- Cooking style: Italian
- Previous restaurant
- The Tuscan Gun Officine Alimentari
- Television shows
- Extra Virgin; Extra Virgin Americana

Gabriele Corcos (born 7 October 1972) is an Italian celebrity cook, entrepreneur, and television personality. He is the creator, host, and producer of Extra Virgin on the Cooking Channel. He is also the author of a New York Times best-selling cookbook, Extra Virgin. Corcos owned The Tuscan Gun Officine Alimentari in Windsor Terrace, Brooklyn, New York, which is now permanently closed.

He starred with his wife, Debi Mazar, in the television show, Extra Virgin Americana, which ran for eight episodes in early 2016 on The Cooking Channel. Corcos has involved himself with several anti-hunger charities.

== Family background and early life ==
Born into a family of Sephardic Jewish descent in Fiesole, Corcos was raised Jewish in Tuscany. After graduating from high school, he enlisted in the Italian Army where he studied medicine at the military academy for several years. However, his passion was in music and he decided to pursue his musical studies rather than complete his medical degree and be deployed in a war zone. Corcos traveled to Brazil, Cuba, and Morocco to study drums and to perform with local musicians.

He and his family live in Windsor Terrace, Brooklyn and Italy.

== Professional career ==
In 2001, Corcos met his wife, Debi Mazar in Florence. He left his family in Fiesole to move to the United States. The two married on 16 March 2002. While his wife was filming during the day, Corcos would write on his computer about the impression American food had made on him.

One day the couple filmed themselves in the kitchen making a sauce for spaghetti. They posted it on the newly launched website, YouTube. In 2006, the "Under the Tuscan Gun" blog and web series was born, after the two received many emails from people who loved the project. The couple raised a large community of devoted fans over the five-year course of the web series, with no intention of going to TV. However, with the creation the Cooking Channel in May 2010 by Scripps Networks Interactive, the couple was asked to be the hosts of the channel's first original cooking show. The Boston Globe thus dubbed them Cooking Channel's "first family". The interaction between Corcos and Mazar has been compared to that of Ricky and Lucy Ricardo on I Love Lucy.

On 4 June 2019, Gabriele Corcos was honoured as a Knight, the highest Italian civilian honour, by the Italian President in recognition of his work on behalf of the Italian heritage in the United States.

== Culinary background ==
Corcos's experience with cooking started from a very early age. He says his fondest memories are shared cooking in the kitchen with his grandmother and mother, as a small child. Corcos learned about Tuscan food and traditional farmers' cuisine from them. While living in Los Angeles, Corcos spent a few years working in the kitchens of chefs such as Gino Angelini of Osteria Angelini. In addition, for the year of 2012 he was appointed as executive chef of the prestigious Montauk Yacht Club. Corcos has been participating in both the Food Network New York City and Food Network South Beach Wine and Food Festivals since 2011 as a celebrity chef. In February 2015, he hosted the opening event at the festival, entitled the Ronzoni Italian Feast event.

== Charity work ==
While making an appearance on Food Network's Chopped in April 2013, he competed on behalf of the charity Feeding America. In May 2013, Corcos and his family participated in the Live Below the Line Challenge. For five days, the family had $1.50 each per day to spend on food, which is the equivalent of the poverty line in America. Furthermore, in 2014, Corcos became a council member of the Food Bank For New York City and hosted a pop-up dinner series in October 2014 where a large portion of the proceeds benefited the Food Bank.

== Extra Virgin television show ==
Season 1 of Extra Virgin premiered in 2011 and as of 2015 has included five seasons. Extra Virgin airs domestically on the Cooking Channel and outside the United States on the Food Network International platforms.

== Extra Virgin cookbook ==
The Extra Virgin cookbook, Extra Virgin: Recipes & Love from Our Tuscan Kitchen, was released on 6 May 2014. It was #1 on Amazon's Italian Cooking rankings for six months and remains in the top 10 as of October 2015. In June 2014, the cookbook made the New York Times Best-Seller list. The cookbook includes both authentic Tuscan dishes and Tuscan-inspired dishes. The cookbook contains 120 recipes which "straddle the line between simple and all-out seduction."

== Tuscan Gun Officine Alimentari Shop ==
Opened in May 2015 and out of business in late 2017, its menu included cuisine from Italy. Located in Brooklyn, New York, the shop was open every day for breakfast and lunch. In addition, a few ticketed dinners were held monthly, with tasting menus using seasonal ingredients.
