= When (album) =

Album by Vincent Gallo

Studio album by Vincent Gallo
- Released: October 1, 2001
- Recorded: 2000–2001
- Studio: The University for the Development and Theory of Magnetic Tape Recorded Music Studios, Hollywood Hills, California, U.S.
- Length: 42:54
- Label: Warp
- Producer: Vincent Gallo

Vincent Gallo chronology
When (2001)	Recordings of Music for Film (2002)

When is a studio album by Vincent Gallo, released on Warp in 2001. It peaked at number 44 on the UK Independent Albums Chart.

== Critical reception ==
Professional ratings
Review scores
Source	Rating
AllMusic	4.5/5 stars
Drowned in Sound	5/10
Exclaim!	favorable
NME	3.5/5 stars
Pitchfork	7.3/10
Stylus Magazine	C+

Tim DiGravina of AllMusic gave the album 4.5 stars out of 5, saying, "With its smart, confident arrangements, consistent tone, and fascinating personal themes, the album sees Gallo making a bold, confident, and mature musical step of considerable relevance." James Keast of Exclaim! described it as "an atypical, eccentric and occasionally atonal exploration of simple sounds and dissonant piano and guitar plinking."

Alex Needham of NME said, "Gallo may not be renowned for subtlety in his life, but he’s a master of it in his work." David M. Pecoraro of Pitchfork gave the album a 7.3 out of 10, describing it as "a gorgeous collection of songs which paint an undeniably clear picture of their creator."

In 2015, Clash included it on the "7 of the Best: Albums by Artists More Famous for Other Things" list.

In 2016, Polish singer Monika Brodka listed the album's track "Yes I'm Lonely" as one of her favorite songs. Brodka wrote "I love the whole album and I listen to it regularly. It’s a subtle and gorgeous collection of songs...[Gallo] may be a freak, but I really respect his work.

== Track listing ==
All tracks are written by Vincent Gallo.

No.	Title	Length
1.	"I Wrote This Song for the Girl Paris Hilton"	4:10
2.	"When"	4:36
3.	"My Beautiful White Dog"	4:01
4.	"Was"	3:25
5.	"Honey Bunny"	4:22
6.	"Laura"	4:59
7.	"Cracks"	3:36
8.	"Apple Girl"	3:14
9.	"Yes I'm Lonely"	3:51
10.	"A Picture of Her"	6:44
Total length:		42:54

== Charts ==
Chart	Peak position
French Albums (SNEP)	117
UK Independent Albums (OCC)	44
