= Graffiti Rock =

- Presented by: Michael Holman
- Starring: Michael Holman; Run-DMC; Shannon; New York City Breakers; Kool Moe Dee; Special K
- Country of origin: United States
- No. of episodes: 1

Production
- Running time: 23 minutes
- Production companies: Orbis Communications; SkyWise Productions; CB Communication, Inc.

Original release
- Network: WPIX-TV
- Release: June 28, 1984

Graffiti Rock was a hip-hop based television program, originally aired on June 28, 1984. Intended as an ongoing series, the show only received one pilot episode and aired on WPIX channel 11 in New York City and 88 markets around the country, to good Nielsen ratings.

Graffiti Rock resembled a hip hop version of the popular television dance shows at the time such as Soul Train and American Bandstand. The show was created and hosted by Michael Holman, who was the manager of the popular break-dancing crew, the New York City Breakers.

The episode features Run-D.M.C., Shannon, The New York City Breakers DJ Jimmie Jazz, Kool Moe Dee and Special K of the Treacherous Three. The New York City Breakers, who were fresh off of their success from the movie Beat Street, made a showcase appearance. The episode also features television and film actress, Debi Mazar and actor/director Vincent Gallo (who identified as "Prince Vince") as dancers on the show.

A segment of the show was sampled on The Beastie Boys' LP Ill Communication. "[...] alright, you're scratchin it right now, cut the record back and forth against the needle, back and forth, back and forth, makin' it scratch, but let me tell you something: don't try this at home with your dad's stereo, only under hip-hop supervision, alright?" The show has since become an important 'must-see' for hip-hop enthusiasts, alongside such titles as Wild Style and Beat Street.

In the video for the Non Phixion and Arsonists song "14 Years Of Rap", a set very similar to the one on Graffiti Rock was used. In the beginning of the video the words "Graffiti Rock" can be seen and also heard in the sample.

Graffiti Rock was parodied by Gnarls Barkley in the music video for their 2008 single "Run (I'm a Natural Disaster)," from the album The Odd Couple.

The title Graffiti Rock was inspired by a live hip-hop event of that name created by the photographer Henry Chalfant and hosted by Fab 5 Freddy at the experimental art space The Kitchen in lower Manhattan in 1981.
