= Tetro =

2009 film by Francis Ford Coppola

- Promotional release poster
- Directed by: Francis Ford Coppola
- Written by: Francis Ford Coppola
- Produced by: Francis Ford Coppola; Valerio Di Paolis (Note: for filming in Italy)
- Starring: Vincent Gallo; Alden Ehrenreich; Maribel Verdú; Klaus Maria Brandauer; Carmen Maura
- Cinematography: Mihai Mălaimare Jr.
- Edited by: Walter Murch
- Music by: Osvaldo Golijov
- Distributed by: American Zoetrope (United States); Alta Films (Spain); BiM Distribuzione (Italy)
- Release dates: May 14, 2009 (Cannes); June 11, 2009 (United States); June 26, 2009 (Spain); November 20, 2009 (Italy)
- Running time: 127 minutes
- Countries: United States; Argentina; Spain; Italy
- Languages: English; Italian; Spanish
- Budget: $15 million
- Box office: $2.9 million

Tetro is a 2009 drama film written, directed, and produced by Francis Ford Coppola and starring Vincent Gallo, Alden Ehrenreich, and Maribel Verdú. Filming took place in 2008 in Buenos Aires, Patagonia, and Spain. An international co-production between the United States, Argentina, Spain, and Italy, the film received a limited theatrical release in the U.S. on June 11, 2009.

== Plot ==
Shortly before his eighteenth birthday, Bennie Tetrocini, son of abusive, famous conductor Carlo Tetrocini, runs away from his prep school and gets a job as a cruise line waiter. His ship breaks down in Buenos Aires, the home of his half-brother Angelo, who left the family when Bennie was young to pursue his writing. Angelo's mother Angela died in a car accident, and Bennie's mother has been comatose for almost a decade.

Bennie finds that Angelo, who insists on being called "Tetro", is argumentative, demands he leave as soon as the ship is fixed, and refuses to acknowledge them as brothers, but his girlfriend Miranda, a psychiatrist who met him when he was institutionalized, is welcoming. When she mentions Angela's death, Bennie deduces that Tetro was driving when she died. On Bennie's birthday, Tetro explains that a play he wrote was about their family and featured Carlo and his mentor brother Alfie, also a conductor, who he abandoned after finding success and pressured to conduct under a different last name.

Bennie finds Tetro's script, written in code they both learned in prep school, and transcribes the part about Carlo and Alfie. He attends a burlesque production of Faust hosted at Tetro's friend José's theater, for which Tetro is doing lighting. Tetro fights with actor and playwright Abelardo when he heckles the script, only to be interrupted by influential critic and his former mentor "Alone" arriving, who he had a falling out with. Bennie gives Miranda one of Carlo's CDs, breaking Tetro's rule that he does not discuss their past, and in the ensuing argument, Bennie points out that Tetro broke his promise to come back and take him away from Carlo.

He transcribes the part of the play where Tetro leaves the family when Carlo, believing Bennie is the only artist of his sons, refuses to support his writing. Miranda finds Bennie transcribing the pages. While walking José's girlfriend's puppy, Bennie saves it from being hit by a car and is struck by a motorbike in the process. He misses his ship while hospitalized and Tetro lets him keep living with him, while Miranda sneaks him the play. Carlo has a stroke and the family asks the brothers to come home, which Tetro refuses to do.

Bennie transcribes the part of the play about how Tetro's girlfriend Naomi was stolen from him by Carlo, and has a dream inspired by a letter she wrote Tetro where she and Carlo perform Coppélia with her as the titular character and him as Dr. Coppélius. Tetro walks in on him writing and has a violent fight with him, after which Miranda reluctantly tells him he can no longer live with them. Bennie moves in with Abelardo, where he begins writing a short play entitled Wander Lust that is largely adapted from Tetro's script. He submits it to a festival Alone runs in Patagonia and is accepted as a finalist, hoping that it will stoke Tetro's pride enough for him to officially co-publish it and take credit for his writing, which he does.

As the brothers, Miranda, a Faust actress and her niece drive to the festival, Bennie loses his virginity to the actresses and Tetro vanishes right before the show. As Wander Lust starts, Tetro appears outside the festival and calls Bennie to him, admitting that he is actually his father and Naomi is his mother, who tried to commit suicide after telling Tetro and Carlo about Bennie's parentage, putting herself in a coma. Wanting to fulfill the play's ending where Tetro kills Carlo, he asks Bennie to kill him but is refused. Alone comes outside to congratulate Tetro, who rejects her praise and loses his shot at winning the top prize.

Carlo dies and his funeral is held in Buenos Aires, where Tetro takes his baton from his corpse and presents it to Alfie. Bennie shows up dressed like Tetro as Alfie, unwilling to forgive Carlo, snaps the baton. Bennie reveals his true heritage to Miranda and the family before starting a fire, running past Tetro as he exits. He wanders into traffic and waits for a car to hit him, but Tetro rescues and embraces him, accepting him as his son and promising that "we're a family."

== Cast ==
- Vincent Gallo as Tetro, the protagonist. Coppola said of his casting choice, "I know choosing Vincent Gallo to star in my film will raise a few eyebrows, but I'm betting that seeing him in the role will open some eyes." Prior to Gallo, Matt Dillon and Joaquin Phoenix were up for the role.
- Alden Ehrenreich as Bennie, Tetro's younger brother
- Maribel Verdú as Miranda, Tetro's girlfriend
- Silvia Pérez as Silvana
- Rodrigo de la Serna as José
- Érica Rivas as Ana
- Sofia Gala as Maria Luisa
- Carmen Maura as Alone, a literary critic and Tetro's mentor. The character was originally written to be male, and actor Javier Bardem was previously attached to the role. Coppola explained the change in gender, "As I read and reread (the script), I felt that the interaction between the two characters would be far more intriguing if they were of the opposite sex."
- Klaus Maria Brandauer as Alfie/Carlo Tetrocini, Tetro's father
- Mike Amigorena as Abelardo
- Lucas Di Conza as Young Tetro
- Adriana Mastrángelo as Angela
- Francesca De Sapio as Amalia
- Leticia Brédice as Josefina
- Susana Giménez as Herself

== Production ==
In February 2007, Francis Ford Coppola announced that he would produce and direct the film Tetro, based on a script that he had written while editing Youth Without Youth (2007). Production was scheduled to begin in Buenos Aires, Argentina in late 2007. Coppola was attracted to Argentina as a location, "I knew Argentina has a great cultural, artistic, literary, musical, cinema tradition, and I like those kinds of atmospheres very much because you usually find creative people to work with." Production did not begin as scheduled, and by March 2008, Vincent Gallo and Maribel Verdú joined the cast. The Spanish company Tornasol Films and the Italian company BIM Distribuzione signed with the director to co-produce the film. Production began on March 31, 2008, with a budget of $15 million, with Coppola using the production style similar to his previous film Youth Without Youth. Filming took place in La Boca in Buenos Aires and other parts of the capital city. Filming also followed in the Andean foothills in Patagonia and at the Ciudad de la Luz studios in Alicante, Spain. Production concluded in June.

In May 2008, during filming in Argentina, the Argentina Actors Association, an actors' union, claimed that production of Tetro was shut down due to union members working on the film without a contract. According to The Hollywood Reporter, "Local press reports say that script changes and communication problems between the multi-national cast and crew have extended filming days beyond regularly scheduled hours, and that some of the Argentine actors are still not certain of their salary." The director's spokesperson, Kathleen Talbert, denied that production was halted, saying, "There are no holds on shooting, no problem with actors. In fact, the majority of the Argentine actors have already wrapped the shooting." By the end of the month, the union said the issue was resolved, reporting, "The lawyers for the producers presented the necessary documentation and recognized the errors that they had made. So now they are able to continue with production." In contrast, Talbert reiterated that there had been no issue, and production was never halted.

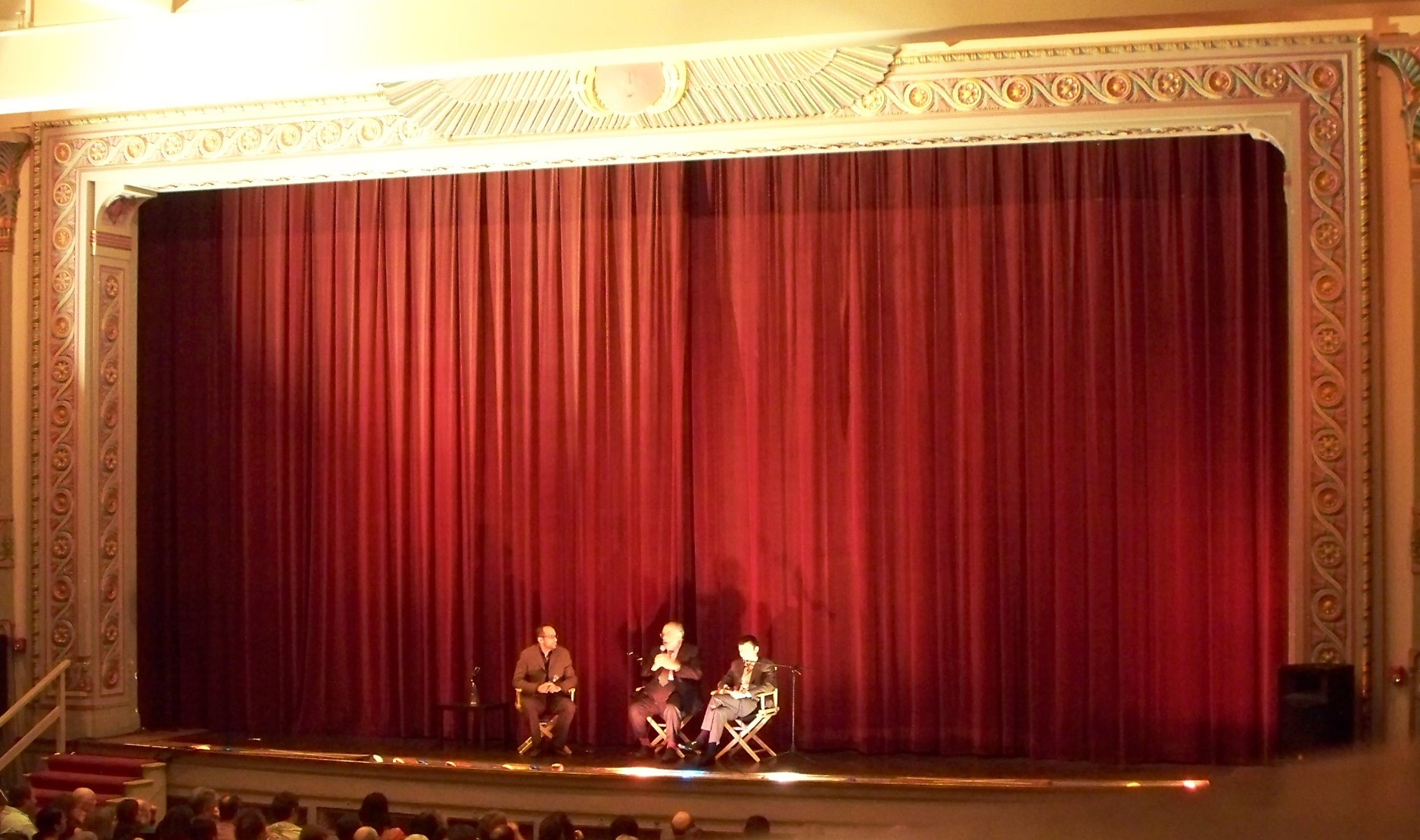
Interview with Francis Ford Coppola & Alden Ehrenreich at SIFF

The entire project was edited using Final Cut Pro on Apple Mac computers in a specially designed large screen edit suite built by Masa Tsuyuki.

The cast includes Rodrigo de la Serna, Leticia Brédice, Mike Amigorena and Jean-Francois Casanovas. The film features a brief cameo by Argentine film star Susana Giménez in her first performance after a ten-year hiatus from film acting.

== Reception ==
The film received generally positive reviews from critics. On Metacritic, the film has an average score of 65/100 based on 26 reviews, indicating "generally favorable reviews". Rotten Tomatoes reported a 71% approval rating, based on 110 reviews with an average score of 6.40/10. The website's critics consensus reads: "A complex meditation on family dynamics, Tetro's arresting visuals and emotional core compensate for its uneven narrative." Metacritic, which uses a weighted average, assigned the film a score of 65 out of 100, based on 26 critics, indicating "generally favorable" reviews.

Roger Ebert of the Chicago Sun-Times gave the film 3 stars, praising the film for being "boldly operatic, involving family drama, secrets, generations at war, melodrama, romance and violence". Ebert also praised Vincent Gallo's performance and stated Alden Ehrenreich "inspires such descriptions as 'the new Leonardo DiCaprio' ". Todd McCarthy of Variety gave the film a B+ judging that "when [Coppola] finds creative nirvana, he frequently has trouble delivering the full goods." Richard Corliss of Time magazine gave the film a mixed review, praising Ehrenreich's performance, but claiming Coppola "has made a movie in which plenty happens but nothing rings true."

Tetro was sixth on the 2009 Cahiers du cinéma Top Ten list.

In 2024, Francis Ford Coppola revealed during an interview with Rolling Stone that Tetro was not meant to be successful but a "test" for himself to teach him what it really means to make a movie, as he had "sort of retired" from being a professional director since The Rainmaker (1997) and instead become a student who could discover what making movies consisted by self-financing "very small, low-budget" films and even organizing unusual rehearsals during which he learned a lot about acting. This was in order for Coppola to prepare himself for the development of his longtime passion project Megalopolis (2024).
