= Space Monkeys =

English alternative band

The Space Monkeys
- Origin: Middleton, Greater Manchester, England
- Genres: Alternative rock, Madchester
- Years active: 1995–2000, 2015–present
- Labels: Factory Too, Interscope
- Past members: Richard James McNevin-Duff; Tony Pipes; Dom Morrison; Chas Morrison; Neil Walsh
- Website: Official website

The Space Monkeys are an English alternative band, formed in Middleton, Greater Manchester in 1995. The band consisted of Richard McNevin-Duff, Tony Pipes, Dom Morrison and Chas Morrison. After working with the band for a number years, Neil Walsh (guitar and keyboards) later joined the band.

The band were signed to Factory Records / Factory Too in the UK and Interscope Records in the US. They were often compared to baggy and acid house music. They split up in 2000 but reformed in 2015. Since reuniting they have performed regularly and released new material, including the studio album Modern Actions and the archival collection Potions of Peace (Factory Demos 1995–1999).

== Overview ==
They released their album, The Daddy of Them All, on 4 November 1997. The single "Sugar Cane" from this album reached 58 on the Billboard chart. The single edit remix of the song was frequently played on American radio in place of the LP version and is available as a separate CD single. The music video for this single was the second video from famed photographer David LaChapelle and featured hip hop legends Rock Steady Crew. The band toured the US and Europe with Smash Mouth and Third Eye Blind. The song "Drug Soup" was recorded especially for and features in the soundtrack of the Gwyneth Paltrow movie Sliding Doors.

The band went on to record a second album, Escape from the 20th Century, which included tracks produced by legendary hip hop producer Prince Paul. However, due to the collapse of Factory Records and other problems, the album was shelved and remained unreleased until 2013. The band disbanded in 2000. McNevin-Duff, Pipes and Walsh went on to release an EP under the guise of "Munki", and Chas Morrison joined avant-garde drum and bass group RSL.

== Post 2000 Split ==
Tony Pipes is now a creative director, working in advertising, broadcasting and design. He is responsible for designing the 11th & 12th Doctor's incarnation of the Doctor Who logo and has worked across brands and advertising for both the BBC and ITV. He created the original British drama strand for the BBC as well as launching key titles such as Luther and Call the Midwife. He was a key member of the Cannes Lion Winning ITV Rebrand team and became Executive Creative Director for ITV Creative where he ran the in-house advertising agency until 2023, and now is Head of Creative Marketing at the Royal Opera House. He writes for the stage and TV, with his first play The Button being produced and performed as part of the SuperNova 8 Theatre festival. He returned to music as The Infamous Beat Thief, releasing the single "StereobookElectronook" in October 2018. In December 2018, he released "Year of the Dog", a new single with Richard McNevin-Duff and continues to release tracks. He returned to the band in 2022, performing at a 25th Anniversary show at Gorilla, Manchester.

Richard McNevin-Duff returned to music with his band Giant Star which, alongside full-time members John Whittaker and James Ritchie, also features guest appearances from friends from the Manchester music scene such as Denise Johnson, Robbie Maddix and Barrington Stewart. Giant Star released the debut album Year of the Snake in 2013. He was also scheduled to appear at FC United of Manchester's much lauded 'club night in the afternoon' Course You Can Malcolm on 25 January 2014, where he was to perform an acoustic Space Monkeys set.

Dom Morrison made headlines in the tabloids in 2010 following his involvement in a bare knuckle boxing match with ex-Happy Mondays dancer Bez.

Neil Walsh became a freelance composer and producer. He worked with English rock band Bôa and produced their debut, platinum selling album The Race of a Thousand Camels. He also produced the UK Eurovision entry by the pop group Jemini that reached number 15 in the UK charts.

Chas Morrison remained active in the Manchester art and music space, latterly becoming executive director for Manchester art collective, Walk The Plank.

== 2015 Reformation ==
In 2015, the Space Monkeys reunited, led by Richard McNevin-Duff, Neil Walsh and Chas Morrison. The reformation was driven by a renewed interest in the band’s music and their legacy within the Manchester music scene. The band quickly returned to live performances, playing the UK festival circuit including Glastonbury in 2015. The band have remained active since and have gone to release new material.

== Release of Modern Actions (2020) ==
In 2020, the Space Monkeys released their third studio album, Modern Actions. This marked their first new material in over two decades. The album was independently produced and released, reflecting the band’s shift to a more self-reliant model of operation after the collapse of Factory Records and changes in the music industry.

Modern Actions showcased the band’s ability to evolve musically while maintaining the fusion of indie rock and electronic influences for which they were known. It included guest appearances from vocalists Denise Johnson and Kyla Brox.

=== Crowdfunding Challenges ===
The album’s production and release were initially supported by the crowdfunding platform PledgeMusic. However, the platform went bankrupt during the campaign, leaving the band without access to the funds raised. Despite this setback, the Space Monkeys self-funded the album’s completion and ensured that fans who had pre-ordered received their copies.

== Continued Activity ==
Following the release of Modern Actions, the band resumed live performances for the following two years. After a gap of over 20 years, Tony Pipes rejoined the band for a guest appearance in November 2022. To celebrate their 30th anniversary, the Space Monkeys announced a special performance at Manchester’s Band on the Wall on 14 February 2025.

== Band Members ==
=== Current Members ===
* Richard McNevin-Duff – vocals, guitar

* Chas Morrison – drums

* Neil Walsh – guitar

* Michael Carty – bass

* Michael Hodkinson – keyboards (2017 onwards)

* Tony Pipes - DJ (1995 - 2000, 2022 onwards)

=== Former Members ===
* Dom Morrison – bass (1995 - 2000, 2015 - 2016)

* Aza Bombaza - DJ (2015 - 2016)

== Discography ==
=== Studio albums ===
- The Daddy of Them All (Factory Too / Interscope / Universal - 1997)
- Escape from the 20th Century (Independent - 2013)
- Modern Actions (Independent - 2020)

=== Other Releases ===
==== Factory Too ====
- FAC 2.09 - Joe McGee Walks on Water
- FACD 2.13 - Keep On Tripping On
- FAC 2.15 - Splinters
- FAC 2.19 - The Ineluctable Modality of Life
- FAC 2.23 - Signing On
- FACT 2.29 - Demo Tape
- FACD 2.33 - Blowing Down The Stylus / Dear Dhinus
- FACD 2.39 - Who's The Daddy Now?
- FACD 2.43 - Acid House Killed Rock and Roll
- FACD(R) 2.53 - Sugar Cane
- FACD 2.63 - March of the Scarecrows

==== Independent ====
- Potions of Peace (2025)
