= You Go to My Head (film) =

2017 romantic thriller film

- theatrical release poster
- Directed by: Dimitri de Clercq
- Written by: Dimitri de Clercq; Pierre Bourdy
- Produced by: Dimitri de Clercq
- Starring: Delfine Bafort; Svetozar Cvetković; Arend Pinoy
- Release date: 27 April 2017 (WorldFest-Houston International Film Festival)
- Running time: 116 minutes
- Countries: France; Germany; Belgium
- Languages: English; French; Flemish; Berber languages

You Go to My Head is a 2017 romantic thriller film, directed and produced by Dimitri de Clercq. The film was produced under the banner of CRM-114 and The Terminal. The film stars Delfine Bafort, Svetozar Cvetković, and Arend Pinoy. The plot revolves around a woman who is suffering from post-traumatic amnesia. The film premiered at the WorldFest-Houston International Film Festival on 27 April 2017.

The film won numerous awards, including Best Directing and Special Jury Award at the WorldFest-Houston International Film Festival. It subsequently won Best Foreign Feature and Best Actress - Feature Film at the 2018 Twister Alley Film Festival. The film has received generally favourable reviews from film critics, with review-aggregation websites Rotten Tomatoes and Metacritic giving 67 percent and 69 percent positive reviews, respectively.

== Synopsis ==
A woman is lost in the Sahara desert after a car accident. She is found by Jake, an architect, and taken to the nearest doctor, who discovers that the woman is suffering from post-traumatic amnesia. Jake claims that he is her husband and names her Kitty. He takes her to his desert home so she can recover. The woman struggles to understand who she is, and she starts to fall in love with Jake. However, when her past begins to surface, Jake increasingly begins to fear losing her.

== Cast ==
Credits adapted from Rotten Tomatoes.

- Delfine Bafort as Dafne / Kitty
- Svetozar Cvetkovic as Jake
- Arend Pinoy as Ben

== Production ==
You Go to My Head was the directorial debut for the producer Dimitri de Clercq. It was entirely filmed in Morocco, with four key crew and three actors. De Clercq wrote the script with the actor Delfine Bafort in mind, and described her as "the soul and spirit behind [the film]". When he approached Bafort to play the lead role, she agreed to act in the film under the condition that she would receive the screenplay. When de Clercq and Matt Steigbigel developed the film's plot, the first draft was more "graphically violent than the script used for the film". The actor Svetozar Cvetković was approached by co-producer Zoran Tasic a few weeks before principal photography began. According to the director, he was "very taken by the story", and immediately agreed to play the lead role.

De Clercq said that the desert was "key in inspiring [him] to make this film". He compared his other films Earth and Ashes (2004) and Son of Babylon (2009), both of which were filmed in deserts, to You Go to My Head. De Clercq collaborated with Stijn Grupping as director of photography, having worked with him on a previous film shot in Morocco. The film does not use any artificial lights. De Clercq has described You Go to My Head as a "dream" film.

When discussing her nudity in the film, Bafort said: "In my nudity, I wanted to feel free. I imagined the sun was my protection. After a while, shame disappears. It wasn’t easy, but I felt more and more connected to nature. In order to find my character, I tried to see and experience my surroundings as if for the first time." She further added that she never felt awkward or uncomfortable with intimate scenes with Cvetkovic, because he made her feel at ease. The post-production work was finished in Munich, Germany.

== Release ==
The film premiered at the WorldFest-Houston International Film Festival on 27 April 2017, where it won the Best Directing and Special Jury awards. In its opening weekend, You Go to My Head was screened in one theatre, grossing $5,864. In its second weekend, the film was screened in two theatres, grossing $2,398, an average of $1,199 per theatre. You Go to My Head has grossed $10,682 worldwide.

=== Critical response ===
On the review aggregator Rotten Tomatoes, the film holds an approval rating of 60 percent based on ten reviews, with an average rating of 6.8/10. Metacritic, which uses a weighted average, assigned the film a score of 69 out of 100 based on six critics, indicating "generally favorable reviews".

Frank Scheck of The Hollywood Reporter praised the film's visuals and the lead actors' performances, writing "the movie nonetheless casts a spell, thanks to the hypnotic visuals [...] and the very effective, understated performances by the two leads". Kimber Myers of the Los Angeles Times found aspects of the film problematic, stating that "there's an interesting approach to the standard amnesia story somewhere in this languidly paced drama, but it largely seems engineered to show its lead actress nude for the pleasure of her much-older 'husband,' the director himself and those in the audience unconcerned with Kitty as a human being". Andrew Stover of Film Threat praised the cinematography of the film, writing, "It is a breathtaking, yet deadly location with vistas, ancient sites, and bodies of water."

Joe Leydon of Variety praised Bafort for her performance in the film, stating that her "lithe and expressive physicality serve her well while playing a woman skittishly awakening to a world she doesn't remember". The pacing was criticised by Elizabeth Weitzman of TheWrap, who wrote: "There's nothing wrong with a movie that follows its own, insistently deliberate pace. If there is no satisfying end goal, however, an iconoclastic approach quickly shifts from artistic depth to empty posing". Shilpa Sebastian of The Hindu wrote, "Even though Dimitri has dominantly used the desert sand, huge white walls (of Jake's house) as the backdrop, the imagery created is a class apart and lingers in your mind."

=== Accolades ===
List of award and nominations received by You Go to My Head
Year	Award	Category	Result	Ref(s).
2017	WorldFest-Houston International Film Festival	Best Directing	Won	
2017	WorldFest-Houston International Film Festival	Special Jury Award	Won	
2017	WorldFest-Houston International Film Festival	Best Actress	Nominated	
2018	Twister Alley Film Festival	Best Foreign Feature	Won	
2018	Twister Alley Film Festival	Best Actor - Feature Film	Nominated	
2018	Twister Alley Film Festival	Best Ensemble - Feature Film	Nominated	
2018	Twister Alley Film Festival	Best Actress - Feature Film	Won	
2018	Twister Alley Film Festival	Best Director - Feature Film	Nominated	
2018	Aesthetica Short Film Festival	Best Narrative Feature	Won	
2018	Arizona International Film Festival	Festival Grand Prize	Won	
2018	Arizona International Film Festival	Special Jury Award for Outstanding Cinematography	Won	
2019	Spokane International Film Festival	Best Narrative Feature	Nominated	
