= New York City Breakers =

American hip hop group

The New York City Breakers are an original Breaking Crew in early 1980s that was established in the Bronx borough of New York City formed by Michael Holman. The group originally consisted of members from Wildstyle and "Floor Master Crew"

== History ==
The New York City Breakers are a Breaking crew, formed by Michael Holman, originally known as the Floor Masters. Inspired by the Lincoln Center battle off San Juan Hills between the Rock Steady Crew and The Dynamic Rockers. The original members were: "Powerful Pexster" (Tony Lopez) "Action" (Chino Lopez), "Kid Nice" (Noel Manguel), "Glide Master" (Matthew Caban), "Lil Lep" (Ray Ramos), "Mr. Wave" (Tony Droughan), "Icey Ice" (Cory Montalvo), and Flip Rock (Bobby Potts). Their first real exposure came in 1982, with an offer to battle Rock Steady Crew; in NYC at a club called Negril.

Their first performance was on the nationally televised talk show The Merv Griffin Show in 1983. Soon after, the NYCBs began appearing in live performances with Grandmaster Flash and the Furious Five in Boston. They were featured in the 1984 film Beat Street where they battled the Rock Steady Crew and appeared on the first hip-hop television show Graffiti Rock, created by Holman. They also made appearances on various other television programs such on Ripley's Believe It or Not!, NBC's TV Special The Stars Salute the U.S. Olympic Teams, CBS Evening News and P.M. Magazine and the film Sixteen Candles.

The New York City Breakers also became the first B-boys to release an instructional video and album (Break-Master) which went gold and broke down steps on how to hold a competition. They performed in Washington D.C for sitting President Ronald Reagan, during 1983 at the Kennedy Center Honors.

== Film ==
- Sixteen Candles
- Beat Street
- Body Rock

== Television ==
- That's Incredible!
- The Merv Griffin Show
- Ripley's Believe It or Not!
- PM Magazine
- CBS Evening News
- Good Morning America, ABC
- Graffiti Rock
- Kennedy Center Honors
