= Basquiat (film) =

1996 American film by Julian Schnabel

- Theatrical release poster
- Directed by: Julian Schnabel
- Screenplay by: Julian Schnabel
- Story by: Lech Majewski
- Produced by: Jon Kilik; Sigurjón Sighvatsson; Randy Ostrow
- Starring: Jeffrey Wright; David Bowie; Dennis Hopper; Gary Oldman; Michael Wincott; Benicio del Toro; Claire Forlani; Courtney Love; Parker Posey
- Cinematography: Ron Fortunato
- Edited by: Michael Berenbaum
- Music by: John Cale; Julian Schnabel
- Production company: Eleventh Street Productions
- Distributed by: Miramax Films
- Release date: August 9, 1996
- Running time: 106 minutes
- Country: United States
- Languages: English; Spanish
- Budget: $3.3 million
- Box office: $3 million

Basquiat is a 1996 American biographical drama film directed, written and co-scored by Julian Schnabel in his feature directorial debut. The film is based on the life of American postmodernist/neo-expressionist artist Jean-Michel Basquiat. It is the first film about an American painter written and directed by another painter.

Jeffrey Wright portrays Basquiat, a Brooklyn-born artist who used his graffiti roots as a foundation to create collage-style paintings on canvas. David Bowie plays Basquiat's friend and mentor, pop artist Andy Warhol. Additional cast members include Gary Oldman as a character based on Schnabel, Michael Wincott as the poet and art critic Rene Ricard, Dennis Hopper as Bruno Bischofberger, Parker Posey as gallery owner Mary Boone, and Claire Forlani, Christopher Walken, Willem Dafoe, Courtney Love, Tatum O'Neal, and Benicio del Toro in supporting roles as "composite characters".

== Plot ==
The film is a lightly fictionalized account of Basquiat's life. A struggling artist living in a cardboard box in Tompkins Square Park works his way up the rungs of the New York art world in the eighties, thanks in part to his association with Andy Warhol, the art dealer Bruno Bischofberger, poet and critic René Ricard, and fellow artist Albert Milo.

Alongside the development of his artistic career, the film follows Basquiat's tumultuous relationship with Gina, a fellow aspiring artist he meets while she is working as a waitress at the diner he frequents with his friend Benny. Their romance is affected by Basquiat's affair with "Big Pink", a woman he picks up on the street, and his heroin addiction. Eventually, Basquiat finds himself isolated by his fame, the death of Warhol, and his drug use. The film ends with an intertitle stating that Basquiat died of a heroin overdose on August 12, 1988, at the age of 27.

== Cast ==
- Jeffrey Wright as Jean-Michel Basquiat
- David Bowie as Andy Warhol
- Benicio del Toro as Benny Dalmau
- Dennis Hopper as Bruno Bischofberger
- Gary Oldman as Albert Milo
- Michael Wincott as René Ricard
- Claire Forlani as Gina Cardinale
- Parker Posey as Mary Boone
- Courtney Love as Big Pink
- Elina Löwensohn as Annina Nosei
- Paul Bartel as Henry Geldzahler
- Tatum O'Neal as Cynthia Kruger
- Christopher Walken as The Interviewer
- Willem Dafoe as the Electrician
- Michael Badalucco as Counterman At Deli
- Sam Rockwell as Thug
- Linda Larkin as Fan
- Joseph Glasco as Medieval Villager

== Production ==
=== Writing ===
Julian Schnabel had given seed money to another film that was being developed about Jean-Michel Basquiat, but when he read an early script that he believed misrepresented Andy Warhol, he decided to make the film himself. Schnabel said, ''In the film, I wanted to make a requiem for Jean and Andy ... They were so attacked. Andy cared about Jean-Michel. He was really human. He wasn't a vampire. His death broke Jean-Michel's heart."

The film has a screenplay by Schnabel and a story by Lech Majewski.

=== Schnabel's art in film ===
As director, Schnabel inserted himself into the film as the fictional character Albert Milo (Gary Oldman), based on himself. Schnabel also added cameo appearances by his mother, father, and daughter (as Milo's family). Schnabel appeared as an extra as a waiter.

Basquiat was the first commercial feature film about a painter made by a painter. Schnabel said:

"I know what it's like to be attacked as an artist. I know what it's like to be judged as an artist. I know what it's like to arrive as an artist and have fame and notoriety. I know what it's like to be accused of things that you never said or did. I know what it's like to be described as a piece of hype. I know what it's like to be appreciated as well as degraded."

Basquiat died in 1988 of mixed-drug toxicity (he had been combining cocaine and heroin, known as "speedballing"). Basquiat's estate denied permission for his work to be used in the film. Schnabel and his studio assistant Greg Bogin created paintings "in the style of" Basquiat for the film.

=== Casting ===
After the film was released, Jeffrey Wright said that "I think my performance was appropriated, literally, and the way I was edited was appropriated in the same way his [Basquiat's] story has been appropriated and that he was appropriated when he was alive. [...] Julian made him out to be too docile and too much of a victim and too passive and not as dangerous as he really was. It's about containing Basquiat. It's about aggrandizing himself through Basquiat's memory."

David Bowie recalled how meeting Warhol in real life helped him in the role, and recounted his early meetings with him:

I met him a couple of times, but we seldom shared more than platitudes. The first time we saw each other an awkward silence fell till he remarked my bright yellow shoes and started talking enthusiastically. He wanted to be very superficial. And seemingly emotionless, indifferent, just like a dead fish. Lou Reed described him most profoundly when he once told me they should bring a doll of Andy on the market: a doll that you wind up and doesn't do anything. But I managed to observe him well, and that was a helping hand for the film [Basquiat...].

Comparing Bowie's Warhol to earlier portrayals, Paul Morrissey (who directed many Warhol films) said "Bowie was the best by far. You come away from Basquiat thinking Andy was comical and amusing, not a pretentious, phony piece of shit, which is how others show him." He also noted that "Bowie at least knew Andy. They went to the same parties." Bowie was able to borrow Warhol's actual wig, glasses and jacket from the Warhol Museum in Pittsburgh for the film. Writer Bob Colacello, who edited Warhol's Interview magazine in the '70s and early '80s, said "[Crispin] Glover walked the most like [the real] Andy, [Jared] Harris talked the most like Andy, and Bowie looked the most like Andy. When I first saw Bowie on the set, it was like Andy had been resurrected."

In 2018, musician and actor Lenny Kravitz said in an interview with V Magazine, that Schnabel had asked him to take the role of Basquiat. Kravitz said, "I look back and I'm like, wow, I probably should have done that".

Joseph Glasco, a friend of Schnabel's, had a small acting role in the film and provided some voice over narration. He died May 31, 1996 before the film was released in August. Schnabel dedicated the film to Glasco in the final film credit.

== Reception and legacy ==
=== Box office ===
Basquiat opened theatrically on August 9, 1996 in 6 venues, earning $83,863 in its first weekend. The film ultimately grossed $3,011,195 domestically.

=== Critical reception ===
The film received positive reviews from critics. On review aggregator website Rotten Tomatoes, the film has a 67% rating based on 30 reviews, with an average rating of 6.9/10. The website's critics consensus reads, "With affected strokes, Basquiat paints an expressionist portrait of a misfit artist, masterfully rendered by a riveting Jeffrey Wright." Metacritic reports a 65 out of 100 rating based on 20 critics, indicating "generally favorable" reviews.

Roger Ebert of the Chicago Sun-Times awarded the film three and a half stars out of four, stating that in Schnabel's portrayal of Basquiat "is a quiet, almost wordless presence, a young man who rarely says what he is thinking and often deliberately chooses to miss the point of a conversation. He is dreamy, sweet, and pensive. There are deep hurts and angers". Janet Maslin in The New York Times called the film "bold, attention-getting and more than a little facile, a stylish-looking film without the connective tissue to give it real depth."

David Bonetti of the San Francisco Chronicle gave the film a poor review due to his perception of the inexperience of the director, stating, "Schnabel can't decide whether he wants to tell a traditional rise-and-fall morality tale or make an art film. His attempt at telling Basquiat's story straightforwardly collapses under its own banality". Similarly, the Los Angeles Examiner said that "Basquiat does not seem interested in anything that doesn't advance its director's personal agenda." The review stated that "Though as a writer-director, Schnabel's work is not the total fiasco the debut films of fellow artists David Salle (Search and Destroy) and Robert Longo (Johnny Mnemonic) were, it is fascinating to see what a compendium of Troubled Genius movie cliches he has turned out." Like several of the negative reviews, the review picked out for praise the acting of Jeffrey Wright as Jean-Michel Basquiat, saying "Basquiat's only genuine inspiration was casting Jeffrey Wright, who won a Tony for his work in Angels in America on the New York stage, as the artist. An actor whose talent is visible even in this standard role, Wright's ability creates more interest in Basquiat's fate than would otherwise exist."

The reviews in the art press focused more on the relation of Schnabel as director to his portrayal of Schnabel as artist in the film, and on changes to the facts of Basquiat's life introduced by Schnabel to make a more accessible film. In Art in America, the art critic Brooks Adams wrote:

Basquiat can be seen as a huge, lurking self-portrait of the artist-Schnabel, not Basquiat. So laden is the film with the innumerable coincidences of Basquiat and Schnabel's enthusiasms (among others, for pajamas and surfing) that the movie should be more appropriately called My Basquiat... To a remarkable degree, the movie succeeds, by dint of its authorial slant, in popularizing the myth of Basquiat as a young, gorgeous, doomed, yet ultimately transcendent black male artist, even as it extends and reinflates the myth of Schnabel as a protean, Picassoid white male painter... Yet for all one's apprehension about the very idea of Schnabel making such a film, Basquiat turns out to be a surprisingly good movie...It is also an art work.

== Home media ==
The Blu-ray for this film, including both the original 1996 theatrical version and the 2024 black-and-white remastering, was released by the Criterion Collection April 29, 2025.

== Music ==
The following songs are in order of their appearance in the film.

- "Fairytale of New York" – The Pogues
- "Public Image" – Public Image Ltd.
- "Girlfriend" – The Modern Lovers
- "Suicide Mode" – Nicholas Marion Taylor
- "Suicide Hotline Mode" – Nicholas Marion Taylor
- "I'm Not in Love" – Toadies
- "Lust for Life" – Iggy Pop
- "The Nearness of You" – Keith Richards
- "Waiting on a Friend" – The Rolling Stones
- "Pixote Theme" – Electro Band
- "It's All Over Now, Baby Blue" – Them
- "You Can't Be Funky (If You Haven't Got Soul)" – Bush Tetras
- "Flamenco Sketches" – Miles Davis
- "Ko-Ko" – Charlie Parker
- "White Lines" – Melle Mel (as GrandMaster Flash Melle Mel)
- "Beast of Burden" – The Rolling Stones
- "Rise" – Tripping Daisy
- "Is That All There Is?" – Peggy Lee
- "Paris Je T'aime (Paris, Stay the Same)" – David McDermott
- "April in Paris" – Charlie Parker
- "Who Are You This Time" – Tom Waits
- "India" – The Psychedelic Furs
- "D'amor sull'ali rosee" (Il trovatore, Act 4 Sc. 1) – Renata Tebaldi
- "Tom Traubert's Blues (Four Sheets to the Wind in Copenhagen)" – Tom Waits
- "A Small Plot of Land" – David Bowie
- "Summer in Siam" – The Pogues
- Symphony No. 3, Opus 36 (Symphony of Sorrowful Songs) – Henryk Górecki (London Sinfonietta)
- "She Is Dancing" – Brian Kelly
- "Hallelujah" – John Cale
- "This Is the Last Song I'll Ever Sing" – Gavin Friday

== See also ==
- Postmodernist film
- Downtown 81
- I Shot Andy Warhol - another Warhol-related film from the same year
