= Downtown 81 =

- Directed by: Edo Bertoglio
- Written by: Glenn O'Brien
- Produced by: Glenn O'Brien
- Starring: Jean-Michel Basquiat; Anne Carlisle
- Cinematography: John McNulty
- Edited by: Pamela French
- Music by: Vincent Gallo
- Release date: October 5, 2000
- Running time: 72 minutes
- Country: United States
- Language: English
- Box office: $108,058

Downtown 81 is a 2000 American film shot in 1980–1981. The film was directed by Edo Bertoglio and written and produced by Glenn O'Brien and Patrick Montgomery, with post-production in 1999-2000 by Glenn O'Brien and Maripol. It is a rare real-life snapshot of an ultra-hip subculture of post-punk era Manhattan. Starring renowned artist Jean-Michel Basquiat and featuring such East Village artists as James Chance, Amos Poe, Walter Steding, Tav Falco and Elliott Murphy, the film is a bizarre elliptical urban fairy tale. In 1999, Michael Zilkha, founder of ZE Records (the label of several of the film's artists), became the film's executive producer.

== Synopsis ==
The film opens with Jean (Basquiat) in hospital with an undisclosed ailment. After checking out, he happens upon an enigmatic woman, Beatrice (Anna Schroeder), who drives around in a convertible. He arrives at his apartment only to discover that his landlord, played by former Yardbirds manager Giorgio Gomelsky, is evicting him.

Later, while trying to sell his art work, he encounters many downtown New York characters, from musician Arto Lindsay and his band DNA to David McDermott to graffiti artists Lee Quiñones and Fab Five Freddy. Jean eventually does manage to sell some of his art work to a rich middle-aged woman who is interested in more than just his art, but she pays with a check. As the film progresses, he wanders the streets of New York City, looking for Beatrice. He catches performances by Kid Creole and the Coconuts and James White and the Blacks. Finally he happens upon a bag lady (Debbie Harry) who turns into a princess when he kisses her. As a reward, she gives him a stack of cash.

== Parallels to real life ==
Writer and producer O'Brien had a popular music column "Glenn O'Brien's Beat" in Interview magazine and created the film to showcase the bands that he had been writing about. The film was initially titled New York Beat, referencing the music. The story was created to string together the live performances, shot on the RCA 24-track mobile recording unit, the best live recording technology at the time. O'Brien, who knew Basquiat from his TV Party program and the Mudd Club, cast then-unknown Basquiat in the film, and said of the movie: "The film is an exaggerated version of life," he said.

Jean-Michel Basquiat was homeless at the time of the movie and slept in the production office during most of the shooting. "The production bought Jean his first real art supplies and gave him his first real studio, which he lived in," said Gina Nanni, widow of O'Brien. "All of the books that talk about [art dealer] Annina Nosei giving Jean-Michel his first studio, that wasn't actually true. The film production gave him his first studio, and the first paintings that he made were the paintings that you saw him carrying around in the film."

Debbie Harry (who plays the fairy princess who gives him money), and her boyfriend Chris Stein, both of the band Blondie, bought a painting of Basquiat's for $200 after the end of shooting.

== Production ==
New York Beat was shot over December 1980 and January 1981. The film was funded by Rizzoli, but the movie was abandoned in the mid-'80s due to financial problems. Producer O'Brien resurrected the film after acquiring the rights in 1999 (over a decade after Basquiat's death). It was released in 2000 as Downtown 81 at the 2000 Cannes Film Festival.

The dialogue audio for the film was lost, so actor Saul Williams dubbed the late Basquiat's voice. However, the musical soundtrack, mostly live club performances recorded on location using an RCA 24-track mobile unit, survived.

== Soundtrack ==
The soundtrack features music by: Jean-Michel Basquiat with Andy Hernandez; Basquiat's own band, Gray; John Lurie and the Lounge Lizards, DNA, Tuxedomoon, the Plastics, Marvin Pontiac, Kenny Burrell, the Specials, Chris Stein, Melle Mel with Blondie, Liquid Liquid, Kid Creole and the Coconuts, James White and the Blacks, Vincent Gallo, Lydia Lunch and Suicide. Many of the recordings were of live performances, but DNA and Tuxedomoon were recorded in the studio for the soundtrack.

== Reception ==
After it premiered as "Downtown '81" at the 2000 Cannes Film Festival, reviews were mostly favorable. Variety called it “an extraordinary real-life snapshot of hip, arty, clubland Manhattan in the post-punk era.”

A rare movie review in Artforum said, "Basquiat is a joy to watch. He floats through the movie with cool grace and unflagging energy; he's a natural in front of the lens..."

British art critic Adrian Searle wrote that "Downtown 81 captures that New York moment when punk, emerging rap, art school cool and the East Village art and music scenes were at their creative best.”

While the main appeal of the film seems to have been the art and music, some commentators also appreciated giving the modern viewer a peek at the decimated Lower East Side of 1980, saying "the real star of the film is the gritty milieu of a New York long gone", and that "New York Beat...conveys the vast gulf between Manhattan's rich and the forgotten corners of the city, and the marginal existence of the artistic underground who tried to survive in between these worlds."
