= Sesame Street: 25 Wonderful Years =

1993 TV special directed by Mustapha Khan

- Based on: Sesame Street by Joan Ganz Cooney and Lloyd Morrisett Kermit the Frog by Jim Henson
- Written by: Luis Santeiro; Sara Compton; Judy Freudberg; Jeff Moss; Norman Stiles
- Directed by: Mustapha Khan; Jon Stone
- Starring: Caroll Spinney
- Music by: Robby Merkin (musical director); Dave Conner (associate music director); Danny Epstein (music coordinator); Michael Rubin (additional music); Nick Balaban (additional music); Christopher Cerf (songs); Sara Compton (songs); Stephen Lawrence (songs); Jeff Moss (songs); Joe Raposo (songs); Bud Luckey (songs); Norman Stiles (songs)
- Country of origin: United States
- Original language: English

Production
- Executive producer: Diana Birkenfield
- Producer: Arlene Sherman
- Cinematography: Donald Peterman (director of photography) (uncredited)
- Editors: Robert J. Emerick (editing sypervisor); Evamarie Keller (videotape editor); Linda M. Long (videotape editor); John R. Tierney (videotape editor)
- Running time: 56:24 minutes
- Production company: Children's Television Workshop

Original release
- Release: October 29, 1993

Sesame Street: 25 Wonderful Years is the home video version of Sesame Street Jam: A Musical Celebration, a special aired on PBS during their pledge drive on March 6, 1994, that commemorates Sesame Street’s 25th anniversary in 1994. This program was originally released on October 29, 1993, under the title Sesame Street's 25th Birthday: A Musical Celebration! 25 Wonderful Years focused on celebrity segments, many coming from segments filmed for the show's upcoming 25th season, of artists such as En Vogue and Ladysmith Black Mambazo.

== Plot ==
While noticing the many talents that people have throughout Central Park, Telly, Prairie Dawn, and Big Bird get the idea to put on a big show. They audition dancers and "la-la"-ers (singers). However, when the Amazing Mumford attempts to audition, he makes everyone sound like different animals. In between, classic Sesame Street songs are shown, such as "Count It Higher", "I Love Trash", "Rubber Duckie", "C is for Cookie", "Adventure", and "I Don't Want to Live on the Moon". All hope begins to be lost for the show as the auditions fail, as Big Bird sings "Sing" all by himself. Then, Ladysmith Black Mambazo comes in singing the "la la la la" part. Soon enough, everyone starts singing with him, making the show successful after all.

== Cast ==
=== Live-action cast ===
- Carlo Alban as Carlo
- Alison Bartlett as Gina
- Annette Calud as Celina
- Savion Glover as Savion
- Angel Jemmott as Angela
- Sonia Manzano as Maria
- Bob McGrath as Bob
- Jou Jou Papailler as Jamal

=== The Muppets of Sesame Street and voice cast ===
- Caroll Spinney as Big Bird and Oscar the Grouch
- Frank Oz as Bert, Grover, and Cookie Monster
- Jerry Nelson as The Count, The Amazing Mumford, Boy, Martian #1, Biff and Herry Monster
- Jim Henson as Ernie, Kermit the Frog, Little Chrissy (puppetry) and Guy Smiley (archive footage)
- Martin P. Robinson as Telly, Fish
- Fran Brill as Prairie Dawn and Little Bird
- Kevin Clash as Elmo, Baby Natasha, Orange AM Monster, and Hoots the Owl
- David Rudman as Humphrey, Chicago the Lion, Martian #2, and Davey Monkey
- Joe Mazzarino as Joey Monkey and Merry Monster
- Pam Arciero as Telly Monster (assistant)
- James Kroupa as Bird in La La Line
- Jim Martin as Goat
- Richard Hunt as Gladys the Cow (archive footage)

Additional Muppets performed and voiced by Noel MacNeal, Bryant Young, Stephanie D'Abruzzo and Alice Dinnean.

== Songs ==
1. "Sesame Street Theme" (Calypso) - The Kids
2. "Adventure" - En Vogue
3. "Do-Wop Hop"
4. "The Batty Bat" - The Count, Ftatateeta and his bats
5. "The Alligator King" - Bud Luckey
6. "I Love Trash" (remade version) (introduction omitted/new sound effect added at the end) - Oscar the Grouch
7. "Count it Higher" - Little Chrissy and the Alphabets
8. Montage of Ernie songs:
  - "Rubber Duckie"
  - "The Honker-Duckie-Dinger Jamboree"
  - "Put Down the Duckie"
  - "Do De Rubber Duck"
9. "C Is For Cookie" - Cookie Monster
10. "Monster in the Mirror" - Grover
11. "I'm an Aardvark" (re-filmed version) - Joe Raposo
12. "Fuzzy and Blue and Orange" (cuts off before Frazzle appears/new sound effects added) - Grover, Herry, and Cookie Monster
13. "Skin" - Kevin Clash
14. "It's Not Easy Bein' Green" - Kermit the Frog
15. "Happy Tappin' with Elmo" (introduction and closing omitted) - Elmo
16. "Doin' the Pigeon" (introduction edited) - Bert
17. "Dance Myself to Sleep" - Bert & Ernie
18. "Feel the Beat" (Part 1 only)
19. "I Don't Want to Live on the Moon" (introduction omitted) - Ernie
20. "We Are All Earthlings" - The Sesame Street Animals: Elmo and Jonathan Lighthouse
21. "Sing" - Ladysmith Black Mambazo

== See also ==
- List of American films of 1993
