= Sesame Street Jam: A Musical Celebration =

- Written by: Luis Santeiro
- Directed by: Mustapha Khan; Ted May; Lisa Simon; Jon Stone
- Starring: Caroll Spinney
- Country of origin: United States
- Original language: English

Production
- Executive producer: Arlene Sherman
- Cinematography: Michael C. Mayers
- Editor: John R. Tierney
- Running time: 50 minutes
- Production company: Children's Television Workshop

Original release
- Network: PBS
- Release: March 6, 1994

Sesame Street Jam: A Musical Celebration is a television special which was first broadcast on PBS on March 6, 1994 to celebrate the 25th anniversary of the educational television series Sesame Street. Its home-video version, Sesame Street: 25 Wonderful Years was released on October 29, 1993. Caroll Spinney plays Big Bird (around whom the story revolves), reading the title card in a voiceover. Celebrity guests and the Muppets sing songs together.

Songs (excerpted from previous shows) include "Adventure" with En Vogue, "C is for Cookie" with Marilyn Horne (and Cookie Monster at the end of the song), "Rubber Duckie" with Little Richard, "The Letter O" with Queen Latifah and Prairie Dawn), "I Don't Want to Live on the Moon" with Aaron Neville, "My Name" with Maya Angelou, "A New Way to Walk" with the Oinker Sisters, "Elmo and the Lavender Moon" with Los Lobos, "Monster in the Mirror" with Grover and his friends and "Sing" with Ladysmith Black Mambazo.

== Cast ==
- Carlo Alban as Carlo
- Alison Bartlett as Gina
- Lexine Bondoc as Lexine
- Ruth Buzzi as Ruthie
- Annette Calud as Celina
- Savion Glover as Savion
- Angel Jemmott as Angela
- Sonia Manzano as Maria
- Bob McGrath as Bob
- Jou Jou Papailler as Jamal

=== Muppet Performers ===
- Caroll Spinney as Big Bird and Oscar the Grouch
- Frank Oz as Bert, Grover, and Cookie Monster
- Jerry Nelson as Count von Count, Martian #1 and The Amazing Mumford
- Jim Henson as Ernie (archive audio)
- Martin P. Robinson as Telly Monster
- Fran Brill as Prairie Dawn
- Kevin Clash as Elmo, Baby Natasha and Hoots the Owl
- David Rudman as Humphrey, Martian #2 and Davey Monkey
- Joey Mazzarino as Joey Monkey and Merry Monster
- Pam Arciero as Telly Monster (assistant)
- James Kroupa as Bird in La La

Additional Muppets performed by Noel MacNeal, Jim Martin, Bryant Young, Alison Mork, Peter MacKennan, Lisa Buckley, Stephanie D'Abruzzo and Alice Dinnean.

== Plot ==
The special starts with the characters enjoying a day in Central Park as a calypso version of the Sesame Street theme plays. Big Bird, Prairie Dawn, and Telly Monster watch as the others make music and dance. Big Bird remembers his Granny Bird saying, "The whole world is a stage." Prairie decides to put on a show, assuring the others that it will be an adventure.

Telly and Prairie search for dancers and musicians, and Big Bird looks for singers who can sing "la-la". Telly and Prairie find Jamal, Angela, Celina, Carlo, the kids, and the other Muppets singing an a cappella version of "Do-Op Hop." Big Bird forms a "la-la line" to audition "la-la-ers." After Humphrey and Natasha unsuccessfully audition, the Count steps up to count those in line and Big Bird cues another song.

Big Bird's next audition is with a duck belonging to the Amazing Mumford, who says that knows a spell that will make everyone sing "la-la". However, the spell makes everyone quack.

Telly and Prairie tell Big Bird that they have found singers, but Big Bird says that he is having trouble finding "la-laers." Telly wonders if it is as hard as finding a letter O. Big Bird, glad that Telly found his letter, wonders when he will find his "la-la-ers."

Mumford returns and tries his spell again, but it makes people "baa" like sheep instead. Telly and Prairie find a jam session and think they have the musicians they need. Elmo, playing the drums, says that playing them is almost as easy as saying his name. He announces a break, previewing highlights of the special's second half.

Telly and Prairie ask Big Bird if he can help them find dancers, but he is busy with his line. The next auditions do not go well, and Big Bird says that he will "go bananas"; at the mention of bananas, Joey and Davey Monkey appear. Prairie and Telly see Jason and Savion while they are looking for dancers, and Savion tells them that there are dancers everywhere in the park. Prairie exclaims at all the people dancing; "... and pigs, too," Telly adds, pointing to the pigs nearby.

Big Bird shows Telly and Prairie the Martians, the "la-laers" he has chosen. When he tells them that they are going to become stars, they take him literally and vanish into space. The next "la-laer" in line is a man who plays the accordion while a chicken clucks and Big Bird begins to lose hope.

His line is gone. Mumford tries his spell again, but no one is around to be amazed by it. Discouraged, Big Bird sits down on a bench and begins singing "Sing" to himself. Ladysmith Black Mambazo answers with a chorus of "la-la"s, which was exactly what Big Bird had been looking for. Mumford tries his spell again and summons all of Big Bird's friends to sing along with him.

== Songs ==
1. "Adventure" (En Vogue)
2. "C Is For Cookie" (Marilyn Horne and Cookie Monster)
3. "Rubber Duckie" (Little Richard)
4. "The Letter O" (Queen Latifah with Telly, Prairie Dawn and Merry Monster)
5. "I Don't Want to Live on the Moon" (Aaron Neville and Ernie)
6. "My Name" (Maya Angelou, Lexine, Carlo and Elmo)
7. "A New Way to Walk" (The Oinker Sisters and Celebrities)
8. "Elmo and the Lavender Moon" (Los Lobos and Elmo)
9. "Monster in the Mirror" (Grover)
10. "Sing" (Ladysmith Black Mambazo and cast)

== See also ==
- List of American films of 1994
