= Can You Tell Me How to Get to Sesame Street? =

1969 song by various artists

Song by various artists
- Released: November 10, 1969
- Genre: Soundtrack; Children's
- Composer: Joe Raposo
- Lyricists: Jon Stone; Bruce Hart; Raposo

"Can You Tell Me How to Get to Sesame Street?" is the theme song of the children's television series Sesame Street. It is the oldest song in Sesame Street's history, dating back to the show's beginning on November 10, 1969, and has been used as the title song in every episode of the show.

== Overview ==
The Sesame Street theme song was composed by Joe Raposo, a writer and composer of many of television shows' songs. In his book on the history of Sesame Street, Michael Davis called the theme "jaunty" and "deceptively simple". Raposo wrote the lyrics to the song with Jon Stone and Bruce Hart. Stone considered the song "a musical masterpiece and a lyrical embarrassment". Raposo enlisted jazz harmonicist Jean "Toots" Thielemans, as well as a mixed choir of children, to record the opening and closing themes.

== Uses within the series ==
=== Opening sequences ===
In the test shows, the theme song lyrics were sung by Bob McGrath. The theme during the test shows was sung in its entirety.

For the first 23 seasons of Sesame Street, the theme song in the opening credits and the show's start was untouched, featuring footage of children playing in various New York neighborhoods. Sometimes, Big Bird would appear in these intros playing with some of the kids. The first version in the opening credits has the melody played by Thielemans while children sing the lyrics. In each episode's beginning storyline, a slower instrumental version of Thielemans's tune is heard.

Beginning in season 24, a different version of the theme was used. The theme song was re-recorded for the opening credits with a more upbeat, calypso, island like tune instead of the harmonica-themed melody of the previous versions with children singing. This version was heard during the show's opening though Season 29. Like the previous version, this arrangement also had an instrumental version that closed every episode, and would continue to do so until 2007, outlasting the vocal version. Also during season 24 from episodes 3006 to 3128, the harmonica music used at the beginning and end of each episode still remained throughout most of the season until April 29, 1993 starting with episode 3129, when the harmonica music was changed to calypso. Even though the vocal calypso theme was discontinued after Season 29, the instrumental calypso theme was still used at the beginning of street scenes up to Season 37, the final season to use the instrumental opening. The opening calypso theme was also played during the special: Sesame Street: 25 Wonderful Years.

Other versions and alterations to the theme song were made to reflect changes in the show's locale. When Sesame Street presented a week of shows from New Mexico in December 1, 1975, the song was augmented to reflect its setting so that New Mexico was incorporated into the song's lyrics (Day 1 uses the regular Sesame Street intro). Years later, a slightly modified version of this variant would be used when the series did an episode from David's grandmother's farm on January 15, 1982, which was later aired as a repeat on January 27, 1984, and again for a visit to Montana in November 1991.

For the series' 30th season, the tune went back to a more conservative tone. Using again a harmonica-style tune, the theme was a throwback to the show's early seasons. Unlike the first version, though, this version was much slower and had additional notes added particularly in the beginning. This version remained for three seasons. Still, the instrumental calypso version, used since April 29, 1993, remained as during the opening street scenes, and the closing theme from November 9, 1992 was still used during the end credit sequence, featuring footage of kids playing with each other in Central Park and interacting with Big Bird.

Again, the theme was given a complete makeover in season 33 to coincide with the revamping of the show's structure. It features footage of Big Bird and some kids playing in the park, while blocks featuring clips from the main segments of the season appear as a way to introduce the show's new format. This version had a slightly different feeling to the song. Also the line "Can you tell me how to get/How to get to Sesame Street" was repeated twice in this incarnation rather than the traditional repetition of "How to get to Sesame Street" at the end. For seasons 34–37, the theme is now modified with different instruments.

Drastic changes were once more instituted for the opening song for seasons 38 and 39. The song again was upbeat, but it now had a style that has a kiddie pop/hip hop tune. Another change was the instrumental opener which now had a softer version of the new rendition. In season 40, the opening sequence changed to the Muppet characters in a chalk-drawn environment. The theme was remixed, this time using mostly live instruments (i.e. acoustic drums, a horn section). The theme was remixed again for the series' 42nd season.

In season 46, another new arrangement was introduced, reverting to a more classic tone. Traditionally, the song started with "Sunny days" and "Come and play", but now, only the first verse is sung to make it shorter. For season 53, the opening sequence mostly remained the same but featured a new arrangement of the theme; and the last shot was re-filmed to replace Murray with Gabrielle, Tamir, Ji-Young, and Tango.

Season 56 introduces another new opening. The classic theme is sung by the Sesame Street cast for the first time. Footages of Grover's Super Suitycase, Cookie Monster's Cookie Cart, and the Magical Beasties are all introduced in that season. The sequence also adds various cartoon visual effects (which are also seen throughout the show beginning in season 56).

=== Closing sequences ===
For the closing scenes that preceded the credits and a list of underwriting sponsors, an instrumental version of the old harmonica-style version in the opening sequence was first used. This version remained intact for 23 seasons. For the most part in the early seasons, the closing sequences showed the kids playing while the credits rolled. In season 2, children's paintings were shown while plastered on the credits. In the middle of Season 3, the camera panned down on a mural of the brownstone 123 Sesame Street apartment as credits were written on the walls and sidewalks. Later in season 5, that sequence was changed to someone driving down a country road. In seasons 10 and 11, the same footage from the previous sequence (without the blue-screen driver's steering wheel) was combined in between new videotaped footage of railroad tracks and a canyon. In Season 12, the closing sequence featured Barkley playing with some kids in a park, which lasted through season 23.

In Episode 1535, the nighttime celesta version of the theme plays over shots of Sesame Street at night.

In Episodes 1620 and 1625, an alternate closing sequence features shots of Sesame Street covered in snow.

In Episode 1710, stills from Big Bird's week at Camp Echo Rock are shown for the closing sequence.

In Episodes 2095 and 2295, a special closing sequence uses footage from the song segment "Jogging" featuring adult cast and the kids jogging through Central Park and other parts of the city and Oscar the Grouch in his trash can bringing up the rear at the end.

Alternate closings with filmed sequences of New York City and upstate New York recorded during the pre-dawn hours were also occasionally used in Seasons 18-23, usually coinciding with episodes taking place at night. A lullaby version of the theme featuring a celesta (or the standard harmonica theme) often accompanied these closings. From 1995 to 2002, a different arrangement was occasionally used to close out episodes taking place at night (This version originally included a children's chorus repeating "How to Get to Sesame Street?" which was later removed).

In Episode 2255, Hoots the Owl's tuba playing played over the credits.

In Episode 2260, a slow jazz version of the theme is performed by Joe Williams and Hoots.

From season 24 through season 37, an instrumental version of the calypso rendition was used, and the closing credits were separated from the closing scenes of the show. The sequence shows Big Bird, Elmo, and a lot of kids dancing in an animated city, with the animation designed by Joey Ahlbum. Unlike the 1992 opening sequence, this credit sequence is used from 1992 through 2006. Originally, the closing credits were only featured on Fridays. In 1993, the closing credits would appear on the season premiere as well. This lasted until 2003 when the credits would appear at the end of each episode.

During seasons 24 and 25, a more "old-fashioned" alternate credit crawl appeared exclusively on repeats from preceding seasons. This closing, using footage from Episode 2525, featured Big Bird walking through Central Park and downtown with a group of children accompanied with the classic harmonica instrumental. Later season versions used different musical arrangements and new footage again. Starting with Season 46, the credits have featured a unique closing song from the theme.

== Other appearances ==
As the show's theme song, it has been featured in many productions related to Sesame Street, in both vocal and instrumental form. An instrumental version with a bit of Christmas-sounding music was included at the beginning of Christmas Eve on Sesame Street. Instrumental versions of the song also appeared in the first and last street scenes in Follow That Bird. The song, usually in instrumental form, has also been included in many video releases.

The theme is sampled in the score of The Great Muppet Caper during Oscar the Grouch's "very brief cameo". It also appears during the ending portions of "The Lovable Monsters of Sesame Street", and in Elmo Saves Christmas, it's incorporated into "Keep Christmas with You (All Through the Year)" and worked into the melancholy score for the future where Christmas takes place every day and all the shops on Sesame Street have closed.

In most countries, several of the international Sesame Street co-productions use their own theme song, while others use the original American version in their own style with slightly different lyrics; one example being the Dutch co-production Sesamstraat.

Also, the Danish co-production Sesamgade uses the same theme (with the same audio from 2002), but with an altered text by Mariella Harpelunde Jensen, so that it fits into a show that focuses on Elmo.

On September 28, 1975, Cher performed the song live as the opening number on The Cher Show to worldwide television audiences.

The theme song was performed at the Jim Henson's Musical World concert on April 14, 2012, and at A Swingin' Sesame Street Celebration: 50 Years & Counting on October 25–26, 2019.

Sesame Street's 50th Anniversary Celebration opens with a montage of the various opening intros used throughout the years. Shortly after, a brief version of the song is sung by Joseph Gordon-Levitt and the cast.

In The Muppet Show, some of the Sesame Street Muppets sing it in Marty Feldman's episode as part of the closing act.

The harmonica version appeared on Milan Prsa's The Railways of Crotoonia episode "Thomas the Building Engine", when Thomas went back to Kahlville Sheds, although redone.

Another cover version was featured in the Scrubs episode "My ABC's".

== The Smart E's cover ==
The theme was "remixed" in 1992 by British rave group The Smart E's. "Sesame's Treet" reached No. 2 on the UK Singles Chart. A further remixed uptempo eurodance/happy hardcore version played by The Smart E's themselves was recorded for the 2000 Dancemania compilation Speed 5.
