= Gene Siskel =

American film critic (1946–1999)

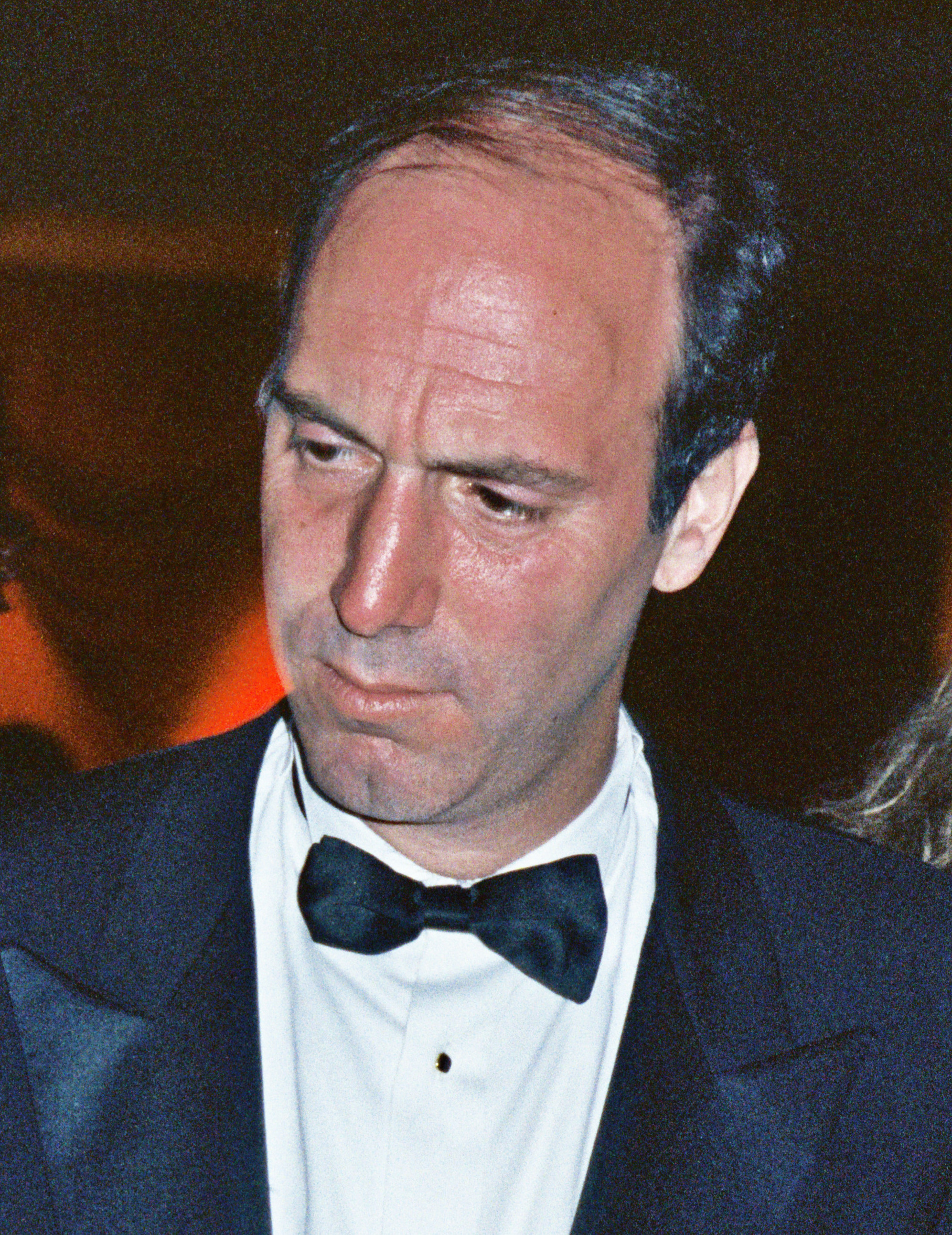
- Siskel at the 61st Academy Awards in 1989
- Born: Eugene Kal Siskel; January 26, 1946; Chicago, Illinois, U.S.
- Died: February 20, 1999 (aged 53); Evanston, Illinois, U.S.
- Resting place: Westlawn Cemetery
- Education: Yale University (BA)
- Occupations: Television journalist; film critic
- Years active: 1969–1999
- Notable credits: Opening Soon at a Theater Near You (1975–1977); Sneak Previews (1977–1982); At the Movies (1982–1986); Siskel & Ebert (1986–1999); CBS This Morning (1990–1996); Good Morning America (1996–1999)
- Spouse: Marlene Iglitzen (m. 1980)
- Children: 3
- Relatives: Ed Siskel (nephew)

Eugene Kal Siskel (January 26, 1946 – February 20, 1999) was an American film critic and journalist for the Chicago Tribune who co-hosted a movie review television series alongside colleague Roger Ebert.

Siskel started writing for the Chicago Tribune in 1969, becoming its film critic soon after. In 1975, he was paired with Roger Ebert to co-host a monthly show called Opening Soon at a Theater Near You airing locally on PBS member station WTTW. In 1978, the show, renamed Sneak Previews, was expanded to weekly episodes and aired on PBS affiliates across the United States. In 1982, Siskel and Ebert left Sneak Previews to create the syndicated show At the Movies. Following a contract dispute with Tribune Entertainment in 1986, Siskel and Ebert signed with Buena Vista Television, creating Siskel & Ebert & the Movies (renamed Siskel & Ebert in 1987, and renamed again several times after Siskel's death).

Known for their biting wit, intense professional rivalry, heated arguments, and trademark "Thumbs Up or Thumbs Down" movie ratings system, Siskel and Ebert became celebrated in American pop culture. Siskel was diagnosed with brain cancer in May 1998 but remained in the public eye as Ebert's professional partner until his death the following year.

== Early life ==
Siskel was born in Chicago on January 26, 1946, the youngest of three children born to Ida (née Kalis) and Nathan William Siskel, who were Russian Jewish immigrants. He spent his early years living in a historically Jewish neighborhood on Chicago's North Side. Siskel's father died when he was four and his mother died when he was nine; thereafter, he was raised by his aunt and uncle.

Siskel attended DeWitt Clinton Elementary School in Chicago and nearby was the Nortown Theater where he often frequented to watch movies. This sparked his interest in films.

Siskel also attended Culver Academies, where he experienced anti-Semitism firsthand when a schoolmate gave him a piece of toast on which jam was spread in the shape of a swastika.

Siskel graduated from Yale University with a degree in philosophy in 1967. While at Yale, Siskel roomed with longtime Chicago TV sportscaster Tim Weigel during his freshman year (both died of brain tumors two years apart), and was classmates with poet Paul Monette and future New York Governor George Pataki. Siskel studied writing under Pulitzer Prize–winning author John Hersey, whose reference later helped Siskel get a job at the Chicago Tribune in 1969.

== Career ==
=== Early career ===
Prior to his job at the Chicago Tribune, Siskel served in the U.S. Army Reserve as a military journalist and public affairs officer for the Defense Information School. For a time afterwards, he was acquainted with Playboy magazine publisher Hugh Hefner.

=== Chicago Tribune ===
From 1969 until his death in 1999, Gene Siskel served as the film critic for the Chicago Tribune, producing over 5,000 reviews during this period. In this role, he specialized by evaluating films through a viewpoint that prioritized narrative effectiveness, most notably its plot coherence and its believable character motivations, while often critiquing films that favored stylistic flourishes over substantive storytelling. His first print review, written one month before he became the Tribune's film critic, was for the film Rascal. His review of the film was not favorable ("Because of the excessive gimmickry, most kids will miss the tenderness," he wrote).

In 1986, the Chicago Tribune announced that Siskel was no longer the paper's film critic, and that his position with the paper had been shifted from that of a full-time film critic to that of a freelance contract writer who was to write about the film industry for the Sunday paper and also provide capsule film reviews for the paper's entertainment sections. The demotion occurred after Siskel and Ebert decided to shift production of their weekly movie-review show, then known as At the Movies (later known as Siskel & Ebert), from Tribune Entertainment to The Walt Disney Company's Buena Vista Television unit. Editor James Squires stated on the move, "He's done a great job for us. It's a question of how much a person can do physically. We think you need to be a newspaper person first, and Gene Siskel always tried to do that. But there comes a point when a career is so big that you can't do that." Siskel declined to comment on the new arrangement, but Ebert publicly criticized Siskel's Tribune bosses for punishing Siskel for taking their television program to a company other than Tribune Entertainment. Ebert privately suggested that Siskel join him at the Chicago Sun-Times, but Siskel remained a freelancer for the Tribune until his death in 1999. He was replaced as film critic by Dave Kehr.

The last review published by Siskel for the Chicago Tribune was for the film She's All That, published on January 29, 1999, in which he gave a favorable review, giving it three stars out of four and wrote that "Rachael Leigh Cook as Laney, the plain Jane object of the makeover, is forced to demonstrate the biggest emotional range as a character, and she is equal to the assignment. I look forward to seeing her in her next movie."

=== Siskel & Ebert ===
In 1975, Siskel teamed up with Ebert, film reviewer for the Chicago Sun-Times, to host a show on local Chicago PBS station WTTW which eventually became Sneak Previews. Sneak Previews gained a nationwide audience in 1977 when WTTW offered it as a series to the PBS program system.

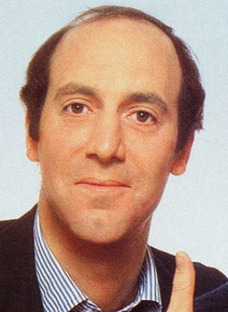
Siskel in a 1982 publicity photo

Siskel and Ebert left WTTW and PBS in 1982 for syndication. Their new show, At the Movies, was produced and distributed by Tribune Broadcasting, the parent company of the Chicago Tribune and WGN-TV. Sneak Previews continued on PBS for 14 more years with other hosts until its cancellation in 1996. It was following their departure that the pair introduced the "thumbs-up, thumbs-down" rating system which, itself, became famous enough to be parodied on comedy shows such as Second City Television, In Living Color, Bizarre, and in movies such as Hollywood Shuffle and Godzilla. In 1986, Siskel and Ebert left Tribune Broadcasting to have their show produced by the syndication arm of The Walt Disney Company. The new incarnation of the show was originally titled Siskel & Ebert & the Movies, but later shortened to Siskel & Ebert. At the Movies also continued for a few more years with other hosts until its cancellation in 1990. The show achieved top syndicated ratings in the 1980s and 1990s, and by 1990, was syndicated to over 200 stations in addition to influencing public discourse on movies through unfiltered debate.

The last five movies Siskel reviewed with Ebert on the show before his death aired during the weekend of January 23–24, 1999. On the show, they reviewed At First Sight, Another Day in Paradise, The Hi-Lo Country, Playing by Heart, and The Theory of Flight. Siskel gave thumbs up to all of them, except for Playing by Heart.

Following Siskel's death, Ebert continued the series with rotating guest hosts, which included Martin Scorsese, Janet Maslin, Peter Bogdanovich, Todd McCarthy, Lisa Schwarzbaum, Kenneth Turan, Elvis Mitchell, and the eventual permanent replacement for Siskel, Richard Roeper.

=== Film and TV appearances ===
Siskel and Ebert were known for their many appearances on late-night talk shows, including appearances on The Late Show with David Letterman sixteen times and The Tonight Show Starring Johnny Carson fifteen times. They also appeared together on The Oprah Winfrey Show, The Arsenio Hall Show, Howard Stern, The Tonight Show with Jay Leno, and Late Night with Conan O'Brien.

In 1982, 1983, and 1985, Siskel, along with Ebert, appeared as themselves on Saturday Night Live. For their first two appearances, they reviewed sketches from that night's telecast and reviewed sketches from the "SNL Film Festival" for their last appearance.

In 1991, Siskel, along with Ebert, appeared in a segment on the children's television series Sesame Street entitled "Sneak Peek Previews" (a parody of Sneak Previews). In the segment, the critics instruct the hosts Oscar the Grouch and Telly Monster on how their thumbs up/thumbs down rating system works. Oscar asks if there could be a thumbs sideways ratings, and goads the two men into an argument about whether or not that would be acceptable, as Ebert likes the idea, but Siskel does not. The two were also seen that same year in the show's celebrity version of "Monster in the Mirror".

In 1993, Siskel appeared as himself in an episode of The Larry Sanders Show entitled "Off Camera". Entertainment Weekly chose his performance as one of the great scenes in that year's television.

In 1995, Siskel and Ebert guest-starred on an episode of the animated TV series The Critic entitled "Siskel & Ebert & Jay & Alice". In the episode, Siskel and Ebert split and each wants protagonist Jay Sherman, a fellow movie critic, as his new partner. The episode is a parody of the film Sleepless in Seattle.

An early appearance of Siskel, taken from Opening Soon at a Theater Near You, the predecessor to Sneak Previews, is included in the 2009 documentary film, For the Love of Movies: The Story of American Film Criticism. In the film, he is seen debating with Ebert over the merits of the film version of One Flew Over the Cuckoo's Nest.

== Critical style ==
Gene Siskel had an abrasive review style, and claimed his film criticism was an individual exercise that should not be swayed by public taste. In an interview for the Academy of Television and Radio, his TV co-host Roger Ebert said of him, "I think Gene felt that he had to like the whole picture to give it a thumbs up." Ebert also noted in a memoriam episode of Siskel and Ebert that when Siskel found a movie that he truly treasured, he embraced it as something special. Directly addressing his late colleague, Ebert said: "I know for sure that seeing a truly great movie made you so happy that you'd tell me a week later your spirits were still high."

== Preferences ==
=== Favorites ===
One of Siskel's favorite films was Saturday Night Fever; he even bought the famous white disco suit that John Travolta wore in the film from a charity auction. Another one of his all-time favorites were the Stanley Kubrick films Dr. Strangelove and 2001: A Space Odyssey. A favorite from childhood was Dumbo, which he often mentioned as the first film that had an influence on him. In addition, Siskel ranked Orson Welles' 1941 film Citizen Kane as among the greatest films of all time. Other notable favorites included My Dinner with Andre (1981), Shoah (1985), Fargo (1996), and the documentary Hoop Dreams (1994).

=== Best films of the year ===
Siskel compiled "best of the year" film lists from 1969 to 1998, which helped to provide an overview of his critical preferences. His top choices were:

- 1969: Z
- 1970: My Night at Maud's
- 1971: Claire's Knee
- 1972: The Godfather
- 1973: The Emigrants
- 1974: Day for Night
- 1975: Nashville
- 1976: All the President's Men
- 1977: Annie Hall
- 1978: Straight Time
- 1979: Hair
- 1980: Raging Bull
- 1981: Ragtime
- 1982: Moonlighting
- 1983: The Right Stuff
- 1984: Once Upon a Time in America
- 1985: Shoah
- 1986: Hannah and Her Sisters
- 1987: The Last Emperor
- 1988: The Last Temptation of Christ
- 1989: Do the Right Thing
- 1990: Goodfellas
- 1991: Hearts of Darkness: A Filmmaker's Apocalypse
- 1992: One False Move
- 1993: Schindler's List
- 1994: Hoop Dreams
- 1995: Crumb
- 1996: Fargo
- 1997: The Ice Storm
- 1998: Babe: Pig in the City

From 1969 until his death in February 1999, he and Ebert were in agreement on nine annual top selections: Z, The Godfather, Nashville, The Right Stuff, Do the Right Thing, Goodfellas, Schindler's List, Hoop Dreams, and Fargo. There would have been a tenth, but Ebert declined to rank the 9 1/2-hour documentary Shoah as 1985's best film because he felt it was inappropriate to compare it to the rest of the year's candidates. Six times, Siskel's number one choice did not appear on Ebert's top ten list at all: Straight Time, Ragtime, Once Upon a Time in America, The Last Temptation of Christ, Hearts of Darkness, and The Ice Storm. Seven times, Ebert's top selection did not appear on Siskel's; these films were 3 Women, An Unmarried Woman, Apocalypse Now, Sophie's Choice, Mississippi Burning, Eve's Bayou and Dark City.

=== Contrarian reviews ===
Siskel had specific sensitivities and feelings that would often vary in extremes regarding certain kinds of bad films. While his partner Roger Ebert was very sensitive to films about race and ethnicity, Siskel was sensitive to films about families and family relationships and had a special hatred for films like House Arrest (1996) and Like Father Like Son (1987), both of which were about parents and their children.

In particular, he often gave negative reviews to films that became box office champs and went on to be considered mainstream classics: Poltergeist, Scarface, Beverly Hills Cop, The Terminator, Aliens, Predator, Indiana Jones and the Last Crusade, Thelma & Louise, and Independence Day. This even extended to several films that went on to win the Oscar for Best Picture: The Silence of the Lambs and Unforgiven.

Siskel walked out on three films during his professional career: the 1971 comedy The Million Dollar Duck starring Dean Jones, the 1980 horror film Maniac, and the 1996 Penelope Spheeris film Black Sheep. When he mentioned walking out on Black Sheep in 1996, he said it was the first time he walked out on a movie he was reviewing since Million Dollar Duck in 1971; he later explained that he did not include Maniac because he did not review Maniac as an assignment for his newspaper or part of his and Ebert's weekly TV reviews but only as a "Dog of the Week", a feature of the TV show in which each critic would single out the very worst movie they had seen that week.

Only once during his long association with Roger Ebert did Siskel ever change his vote on a movie during the review. He initially gave the 1996 film Broken Arrow a "thumbs up", but after hearing Ebert's criticism on the film, Siskel changed his mind to "thumbs down". He then tried to get Ebert to give the 1993 film Cop and a Half a thumbs down but Ebert declined. However, he had changed his opinions on films years after his initial reviews, as with the 1990 film Tremors, to which he originally gave a negative review but later gave a glowing positive evaluation in 1994, stating, "I wasn't sure what I missed the first time around, but it just didn't click."

== Personal life ==
On October 4, 1980, Siskel married Marlene Iglitzen, who was then a producer for CBS in New York. They had two daughters, Kate (a marketing and communications executive at Convergent Energy and Power in New York City) and Callie (a poet and writer), and a son, Will (a coordinator of major league operations for the Atlanta Braves baseball team). Their daughters graduated from Siskel's alma mater, Yale University. He is the uncle of Ed Siskel, a lawyer and former White House Counsel under U.S. President Joe Biden, Jon Siskel, a co-founder of the documentary and film-production based company Siskel/Jacobs Productions, and Charlie Siskel, a documentary film producer.

Siskel was a lifelong Chicago sports fan, especially of his hometown basketball team, the Chicago Bulls, and he would cover locker-room celebrations for WBBM-TV news broadcasts following Bulls championships in the 1990s. He was also a member of the advisory committee of the Film Center at the School of the Art Institute of Chicago and a strong supporter of the Film Center's mission. He wrote hundreds of articles applauding the Film Center's distinctive programming and lent the power of his position as a well-known film critic to urge public funding and audience support.

=== Illness and death ===
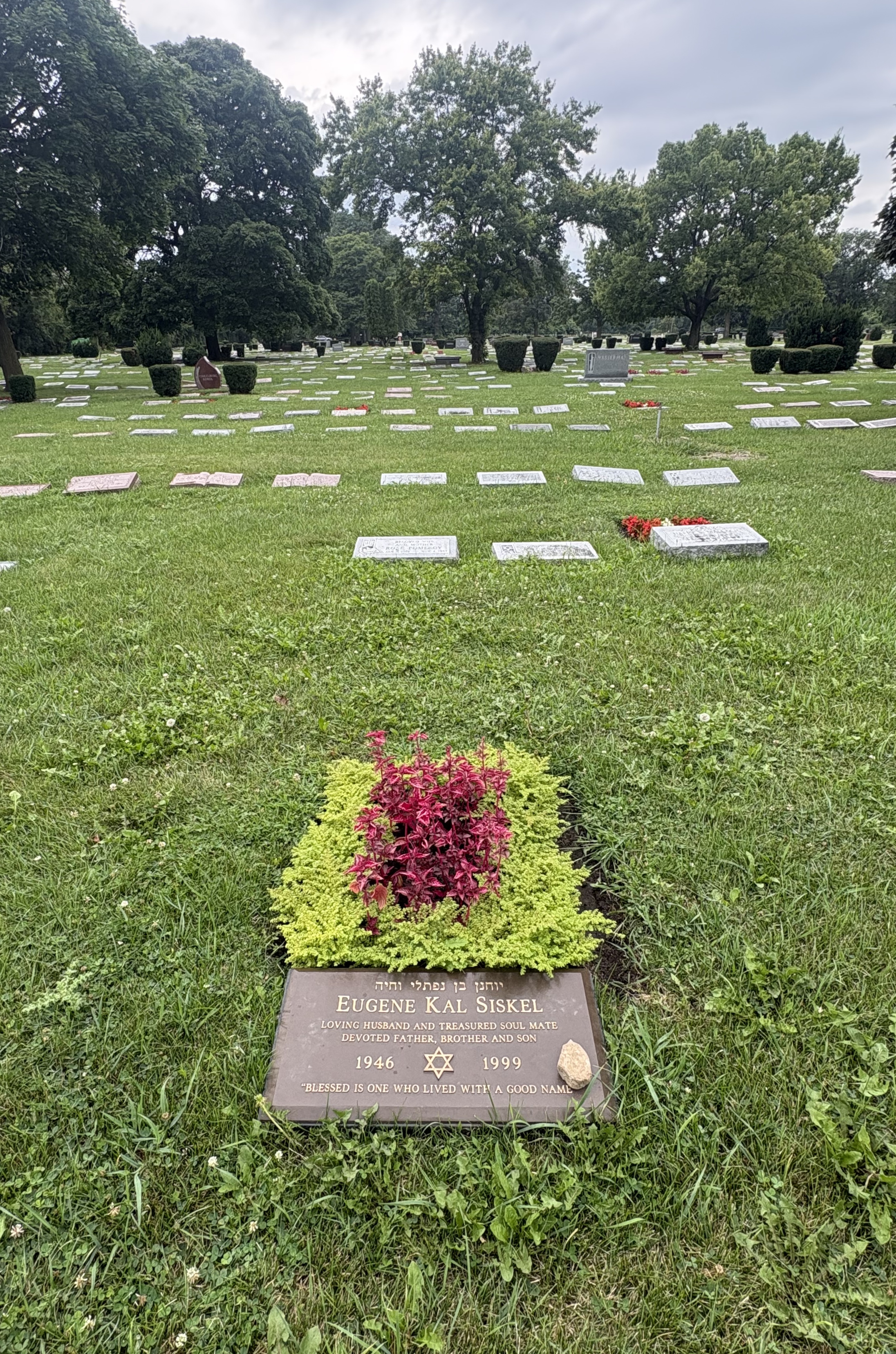
Siskel's grave at Westlawn Cemetery

Siskel was diagnosed with a malignant terminal brain tumor on May 8, 1998. He underwent brain surgery three days later. For a few weeks during his recovery, he participated on Siskel & Ebert by telephone, calling in from his hospital bed while Ebert appeared in the studio. Siskel did not disclose the severity of his illness to anyone outside of his family; publicly, he said that the surgery removed an unspecified "growth" on his brain, and that he was recovering well. He eventually returned to the studio in apparent fine form. On February 3, 1999, he announced that he was taking a leave of absence from the show, but that he expected to be back by the fall, stating, "I'm in a hurry to get well because I don't want Roger to get more screen time than I."

Siskel died at a hospital in Evanston, Illinois, on February 20, 1999, nine months after his diagnosis and surgery; he was 53 years old. His funeral was held two days later at the North Suburban Synagogue Beth El. He is interred at Westlawn Cemetery in Norridge, Illinois.

== Legacy ==
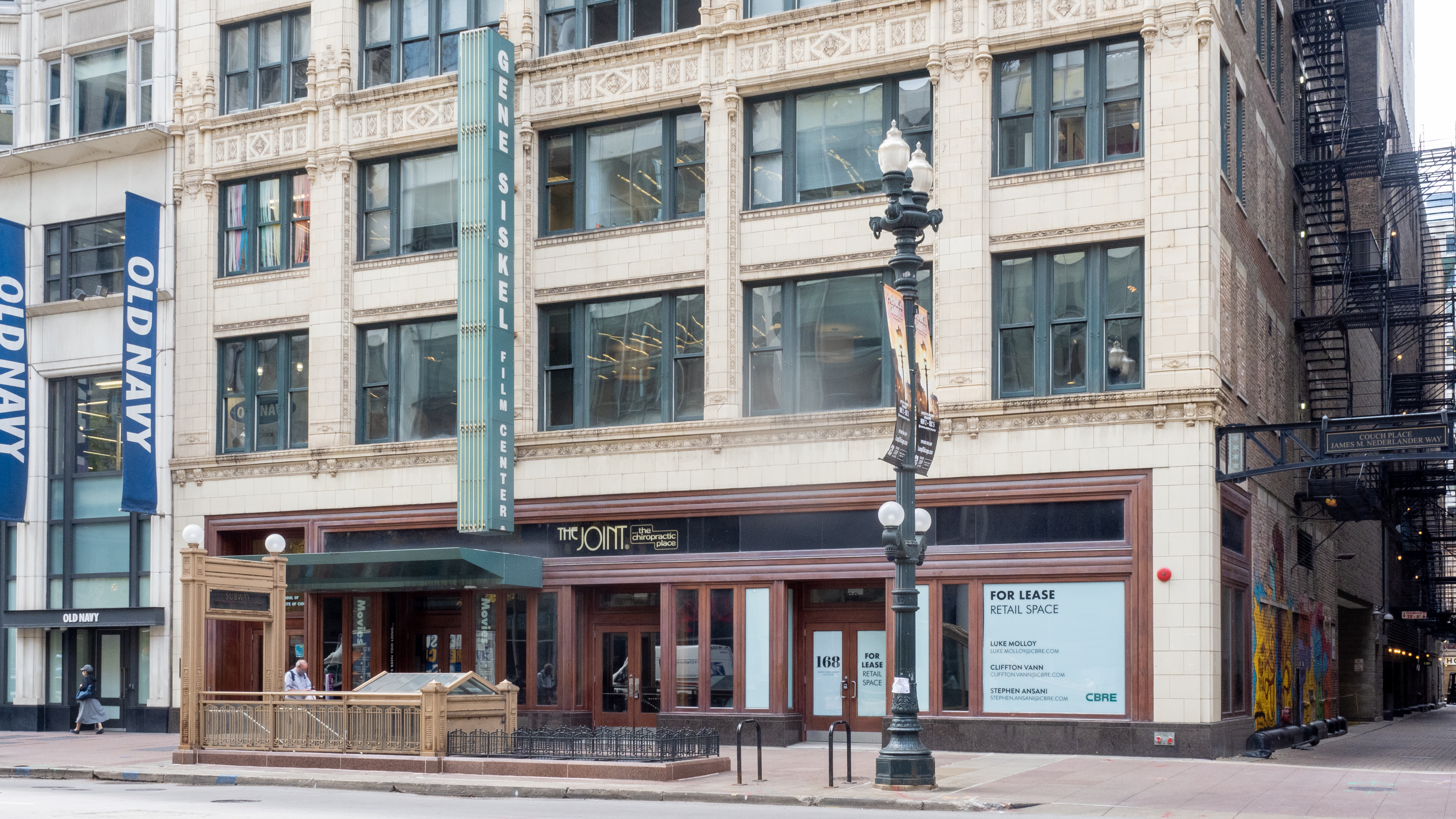
The Gene Siskel Film Center at the School of the Art Institute of Chicago in Chicago, Illinois

In June 2000, the Film Center was renamed The Gene Siskel Film Center in his honor.

Following Siskel's death in 1999, Ebert wrote:

Gene was a lifelong friend, and our professional competition only strengthened that bond. I can't even imagine what it will be like without him. ...As a critic, Siskel was passionate and exacting. I think it was important to Gene that this was the only serious film criticism on television. That made him proud. We had a lot of big fights. We were people who came together one day a week and, the other six days, we were competitors on two daily newspapers and two different television stations. So there was a lot of competition and a lot of disagreement.

Ebert once said of his relationship with Siskel:

Gene Siskel and I were like tuning forks. Strike one, and the other would pick up the same frequency. When we were in a group together, we were always intensely aware of one another. Sometimes this took the form of camaraderie, sometimes shared opinions, sometimes hostility.

When both men appeared together on The Late Show Starring Joan Rivers, Joan Rivers conducted a "together and separately" interview with them, which at one point had each of them wear Walkman-style headphones, playing loud music, while the other commented on his partner. When asked what he thought was the biggest difference between himself and Ebert, Siskel unhesitatingly replied: "I'm a better reviewer than he is", but a few moments later, he said that anyone who read an Ebert review would read "an extremely well-written review".

At the 1999 Academy Awards ceremony, after its in memoriam montage of deceased stars and film contributors (which did not include Siskel), host Whoopi Goldberg gave a brief impromptu tribute to Siskel:

I want to take a moment to acknowledge someone we lost too recently to include in our film tribute. He wasn't a filmmaker, but he definitely was a member of our film community. Now he clobbered some of us with a great big stick and sometimes he touched us with a velvet glove. I'm talking about Gene Siskel. He was a critic but more importantly, he really loved movies, so, Gene, wherever you are, honey, here's to you.

She included the iconic "thumbs-up" gesture; it received a great round of audience applause.

== Work ==
=== Filmography ===
Year	Title	Role	Notes
1975–1982	Sneak Previews	Host	148 episodes
1982–1985	Saturday Night Live	Himself	3 episodes
1982–1986	At the Movies	Host	156 episodes
1982–1993	Late Night with David Letterman	Guest	15 episodes
1983–1995	Nightline	Himself	3 episodes
1985–1992	The Tonight Show Starring Johnny Carson	Guest	15 episodes
1986	The Late Show	Himself	1 episode
1986	Nightlife	Himself	1 episode
1986	Hour Magazine	Himself	1 episode
1986–1999	At the Movies	Host	597 episodes
1987	Rated K: For Kids by Kids	Guest	Episode: "Gene Siskel and Roger Ebert"
1987–1993	Siskel & Ebert Holiday Gift Guide	Host	7 episodes
1988	48 Hours	Film Critic	Episode: "In Hollywood"
1988–1996	The Oprah Winfrey Show	Movie Critic	3 episodes
1989	The Siskel & Ebert 500th Anniversary Special	Host	
1989–1993	The Arsenio Hall Show	Himself	3 episodes
1990	Siskel & Ebert: The Future of the Movies	Host	
1990	Moving Pictures	Himself	1 episode
1991	Big Bird's Birthday or Let Me Eat Cake	Himself	
1991	Sesame Street: Monster in the Mirror	Himself	
1991	The Howard Stern Show	Himself	Episode: "Siskel & Ebert"
1991	The Best of Disney: 50 Years of Magic	Himself	
1991	Siskel & Ebert: Actors on Acting	Himself	
1991	A Comedy Salute to Michael Jordan	Himself	
1992	Sesame Street	Himself	Episode: "An African Lullaby by Lillian"
1992	Diamonds on the Silver Screen	Himself	
1992	Hoffa: Siskel and Ebert	Himself	
1992–1998	The Tonight Show with Jay Leno	Guest	11 episodes
1993	Bob Hope: The First 90 Years	Himself	
1993	Sesame Street Jam: A Musical Celebration	Himself	
1993	The Larry Sanders Show	Himself	Episode: "Off Camera"
1994	Bill Nye the Science Guy	Himself	Episode: "Eyeballs"
1994	Investigative Reports	Media Critic	Episode: "Prime Time Violence"
1994	The 31st Annual Publicist Guild of America Awards	Himself	
1994	The 10th TV Academy Hall of Fame	Himself	
1995	The Critic	Himself	Episode: "Siskel & Ebert & Jay & Alice"
1995–1997	Howard Stern	Himself	3 episodes
1996	Biography	Himself	Episode: "Arnold Schwarzenegger: Flex Appeal"
1996	60 Minutes	Movie Critic	Episode: "Easy Money in Hard Times/The Mormons/Spike Lee"
1996	The Siskel & Ebert Interviews	Interviewee	
1997	Late Night with Conan O'Brien	Guest	Episode: "Gene Siskel & Roger Ebert/Jeffrey Ross"
1998	The Sport Jerks	Himself	
1998	AFI's 100 Years...100 Movies: America's Greatest Movies	Himself	
1998	Chicago Filmmakers on the Chicago River	Himself	
1998	Chicago Tonight	Guest	Episode: "Gene Siskel and Roger Ebert"
1999	Television: The First Fifty Years	Interviewee	

=== Bibliography ===
- The Future of the Movies (1991), with Roger Ebert – collected interviews with Martin Scorsese, Steven Spielberg, and George Lucas about the future of motion pictures and film preservation. It is the only book co-authored by Siskel and Ebert. (ISBN 978-0-8362-6216-2)

== Accolades ==
In 2001, Siskel was posthumously inducted into the Illinois Broadcasters Hall of Fame. In April 2017, Siskel was posthumously inducted into the Silver Circle of the Chicago Television Academy.

== See also ==
- List of people with brain tumors
