= Siskel and Ebert =

American film critic duo

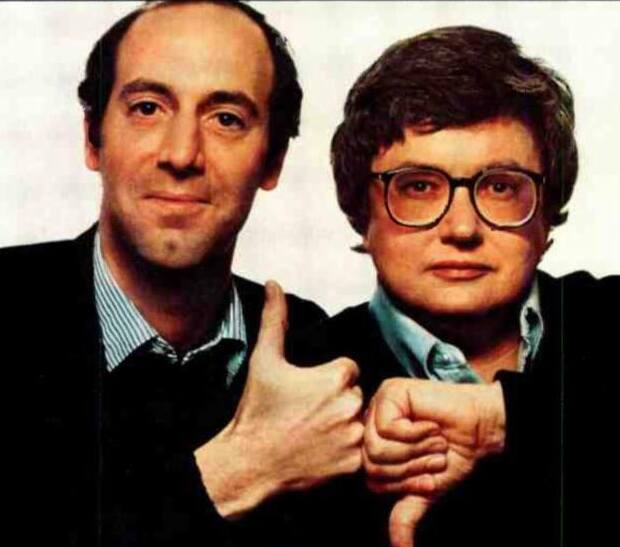
- Siskel and Ebert in a 1982 publicity photo
- Notable work: Opening Soon at a Theater Near You (1975–1977); Sneak Previews (1977–1982); At the Movies (1982–1986); Siskel & Ebert (1986–1999)

Comedy career
- Years active: 1976–1999
- Medium: Television appearances; Film; audio recordings
- Genres: Film criticism; American culture; American film; intellectual humor
- Members: Gene Siskel; Roger Ebert

Gene Siskel (January 26, 1946 – February 20, 1999) and Roger Ebert (June 18, 1942 – April 4, 2013), collectively known as Siskel and Ebert, (Note: Stylized "Siskel & Ebert" with an ampersand) were an American film critic duo known for their partnership on television lasting from 1975 to Siskel's death in 1999.

At the time two of the most well-known film critics writing for Chicago newspapers (Siskel for the Tribune, Ebert for the rival Sun-Times), the two were first paired up as the hosts of a monthly show called Opening Soon at a Theatre Near You, airing locally on PBS member station WTTW. In 1978, the show — renamed Sneak Previews — was expanded to weekly episodes and aired on PBS affiliates all around the United States. In 1982, the pair left Sneak Previews to create the syndicated show At the Movies. Following a contract dispute with Tribune Media in 1986, Siskel and Ebert signed with Buena Vista Television, creating Siskel & Ebert & the Movies (later renamed Siskel & Ebert, and renamed again several times after Siskel's death).

Known for their sharp and biting wit, intense professional rivalry, heated arguments, and their binary "Thumbs Up or Thumbs Down" summations, the duo became a sensation in American popular culture.

== Early careers ==
Siskel started writing for the Chicago Tribune in 1969, becoming its film critic soon after. Ebert joined the Chicago Sun-Times in 1966, and started writing about film for the paper in 1967. In 1975, Ebert became the first film critic to win the Pulitzer Prize for Criticism.

== Partnership ==
Siskel and Ebert started their professional collaboration on the local Chicago PBS station WTTW with a show entitled Opening Soon at a Theatre Near You (1975–1977), before it was renamed two years later when the show was syndicated nationally to Sneak Previews (1977–1982). The show was later distributed by Tribune Broadcasting and changed to At the Movies (1982–1986), and final iteration of the show was when it was produced by The Walt Disney Company with Siskel & Ebert & the Movies (1986–1999). During its successful run with Siskel and Ebert as hosts, the series was nominated for various awards including for Daytime Emmy Awards as well as seven Primetime Emmy Awards including for Outstanding Information Series. Siskel died of a terminal brain cancer in 1999. Ebert continued with the series with rotating guest hosts which included Martin Scorsese, Janet Maslin, Peter Bogdanovich, Todd McCarthy, Lisa Schwarzbaum, Kenneth Turan, Elvis Mitchell, and the eventual replacement for Siskel, Richard Roeper.

== Review style and trademarks ==
Siskel and Ebert's reviewing style has been described as a form of midwestern populist criticism rather than the one formed through essays which other critics including Pauline Kael felt undermined and undervalued the profession of film criticism. They were criticized for their ability to sensationalize film criticism in an easygoing, relatable way. Together, they are credited with forming contemporary film criticism. The New York Times described Ebert's reviews as a "critic for the common man".

The pair were also known for their intense debate, often drawing sharp criticisms at each other. After Siskel's death, Ebert reminisced about their close relationship saying:

Gene Siskel and I were like tuning forks, Strike one, and the other would pick up the same frequency. When we were in a group together, we were always intensely aware of one another. Sometimes this took the form of camaraderie, sometimes shared opinions, sometimes hostility. But we were aware. If something happened that we both thought was funny but weren't supposed to, God help us if one caught the other's eye. We almost always thought the same things were funny. That may be the best sign of intellectual communion...We once spoke with Disney and CBS about a sitcom to be titled, "Best Enemies." It would be about two movie critics joined in a love/hate relationship. It never went anywhere, but we both believed it was a good idea. Maybe the problem was that no one else could possibly understand how meaningless was the hate, how deep was the love.

Siskel and Ebert's professional rivalry was noted in Matt Singer's 2023 book Opposable Thumbs. According to a Tribune editor quoted in the book, when Siskel would scoop his rival in print, he'd exult: "Take that, Tubby, I got him again."

In 1983, the two critics defended the Star Wars films against critic John Simon in an episode of ABC News Nightline. The film Return of the Jedi (1983) had hit theaters that summer and Simon was criticizing the film for "making children dumber than they need to be". Ebert responded saying:

I don't know what he did as a child, but I spent a lot of my Saturday matinees watching science fiction movies and serials and having a great time and being stimulated and having my imagination stimulated and having all sorts of visions take place in my mind that would help me to become an adult and to still stay young at heart. I wouldn’t say that I am childlike, but that [Simon] is old at heart.

=== Siskel's critical style ===
Gene Siskel had an abrasive review style, and claimed his film criticism was an individual exercise that should not be swayed by public taste. In an interview for the Academy of Television and Radio, his TV co-host Roger Ebert said of him, "I think Gene felt that he had to like the whole picture to give it a thumbs up."

In particular, he often gave negative reviews to films that became box office champs and went on to be considered mainstream classics: Poltergeist, Scarface, Beverly Hills Cop, The Terminator, Aliens, Predator, Indiana Jones and the Last Crusade, Thelma & Louise, and Independence Day. This even extended to several films that went on to win the Oscar for Best Picture: The Silence of the Lambs and Unforgiven.

Ebert also noted in a memoriam episode of Siskel & Ebert that when Siskel found a movie that he truly treasured, he embraced it as something special. Directly addressing his late colleague, Ebert said: "I know for sure that seeing a truly great movie made you so happy that you'd tell me a week later your spirits were still high." Some of Siskel's most treasured movies included My Dinner with Andre (1981), Shoah (1985), Fargo (1996), and the documentary Hoop Dreams (1994).

=== Ebert's critical style ===
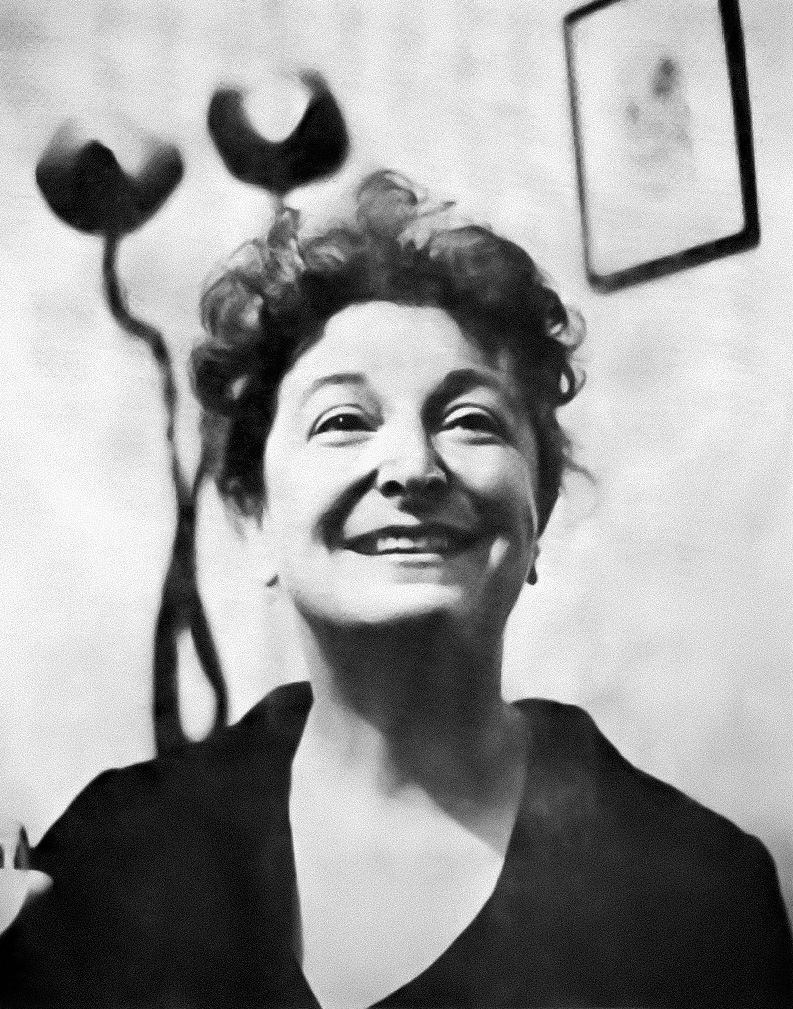
Ebert cited Pauline Kael as an influence.

Ebert cited Andrew Sarris and Pauline Kael as influences, and often quoted Robert Warshow, who said: "A man goes to the movies. A critic must be honest enough to admit he is that man." His own credo was: "Your intellect may be confused, but your emotions never lie to you." He tried to judge a movie on its style rather than its content, and often said "It's not what a movie is about, it's how it's about what it's about."

He awarded four stars to films of the highest quality, and generally a half star to those of the lowest, unless he considered the film to be "artistically inept and morally repugnant", in which case it received no stars, as with Death Wish II. He explained that his star ratings had little meaning outside the context of the review:

When you ask a friend if Hellboy is any good, you're not asking if it's any good compared to Mystic River, you're asking if it's any good compared to The Punisher. And my answer would be, on a scale of one to four, if Superman is four, then Hellboy is three and The Punisher is two. In the same way, if American Beauty gets four stars, then The United States of Leland clocks in at about two.

Although Ebert rarely wrote outright scathing reviews, he had a reputation for writing memorable ones for the films he really hated, such as North. Of that film, he wrote "I hated this movie. Hated hated hated hated hated this movie. Hated it. Hated every simpering stupid vacant audience-insulting moment of it. Hated the sensibility that thought anyone would like it. Hated the implied insult to the audience by its belief that anyone would be entertained by it." He wrote that Mad Dog Time "is the first movie I have seen that does not improve on the sight of a blank screen viewed for the same length of time. Oh, I've seen bad movies before. But they usually made me care about how bad they were. Watching Mad Dog Time is like waiting for the bus in a city where you're not sure they have a bus line" and concluded that the film "should be cut up to provide free ukulele picks for the poor." Of Caligula, he wrote "It is not good art, it is not good cinema, and it is not good porn" and approvingly quoted the woman in front of him at the drinking fountain, who called it "the worst piece of shit I have ever seen."

Ebert's reviews were also characterized by "dry wit." He often wrote in a deadpan style when discussing a movie's flaws; in his review of Jaws: The Revenge, he wrote that Mrs. Brody's "friends pooh-pooh the notion that a shark could identify, follow, or even care about one individual human being, but I am willing to grant the point, for the benefit of the plot. I believe that the shark wants revenge against Mrs. Brody. I do. I really do believe it. After all, her husband was one of the men who hunted this shark and killed it, blowing it to bits. And what shark wouldn't want revenge against the survivors of the men who killed it? Here are some things, however, that I do not believe", going on to list the other ways the film strained credulity. He wrote "Pearl Harbor is a two-hour movie squeezed into three hours, about how on Dec. 7, 1941, the Japanese staged a surprise attack on an American love triangle. Its centerpiece is 40 minutes of redundant special effects, surrounded by a love story of stunning banality. The film has been directed without grace, vision, or originality, and although you may walk out quoting lines of dialog, it will not be because you admire them."

"[Ebert's prose] had a plain-spoken Midwestern clarity...a genial, conversational presence on the page...his criticism shows a nearly unequaled grasp of film history and technique, and formidable intellectual range, but he rarely seems to be showing off. He's just trying to tell you what he thinks, and to provoke some thought on your part about how movies work and what they can do".

— A.O. Scott, film critic for The New York Times

Ebert often included personal anecdotes in his reviews; reviewing The Last Picture Show, he recalls his early days as a moviegoer: "For five or six years of my life (the years between when I was old enough to go alone, and when TV came to town) Saturday afternoon at the Princess was a descent into a dark magical cave that smelled of Jujubes, melted Dreamsicles and Crisco in the popcorn machine. It was probably on one of those Saturday afternoons that I formed my first critical opinion, deciding vaguely that there was something about John Wayne that set him apart from ordinary cowboys." Reviewing Star Wars, he wrote: "Every once in a while I have what I think of as an out-of-the-body experience at a movie. When the ESP people use a phrase like that, they're referring to the sensation of the mind actually leaving the body and spiriting itself off to China or Peoria or a galaxy far, far away. When I use the phrase, I simply mean that my imagination has forgotten it is actually present in a movie theater and thinks it's up there on the screen. In a curious sense, the events in the movie seem real, and I seem to be a part of them...My list of other out-of-the-body films is a short and odd one, ranging from the artistry of Bonnie and Clyde or Cries and Whispers to the slick commercialism of Jaws and the brutal strength of Taxi Driver. On whatever level (sometimes I'm not at all sure) they engage me so immediately and powerfully that I lose my detachment, my analytical reserve. The movie's happening, and it's happening to me." He sometimes wrote reviews in the forms of stories, poems, songs, scripts, open letters, or imagined conversations.

Alex Ross, music critic for The New Yorker, wrote of how Ebert had influenced his writing: "I noticed how much Ebert could put across in a limited space. He didn't waste time clearing his throat. 'They meet for the first time when she is in her front yard practicing baton-twirling,' begins his review of Badlands. Often, he managed to smuggle the basics of the plot into a larger thesis about the movie, so that you don't notice the exposition taking place: 'Broadcast News is as knowledgeable about the TV news-gathering process as any movie ever made, but it also has insights into the more personal matter of how people use high-pressure jobs as a way of avoiding time alone with themselves.' The reviews start off in all different ways, sometimes with personal confessions, sometimes with sweeping statements. One way or another, he pulls you in. When he feels strongly, he can bang his fist in an impressive way. His review of Apocalypse Now ends thus: 'The whole huge grand mystery of the world, so terrible, so beautiful, seems to hang in the balance.'"

In his introduction to The Great Movies III, he wrote:

People often ask me, "Do you ever change your mind about a movie?" Hardly ever, although I may refine my opinion. Among the films here, I've changed on The Godfather Part II and Blade Runner. My original review of Part II puts me in mind of the "brain cloud" that besets Tom Hanks in Joe Versus the Volcano. I was simply wrong. In the case of Blade Runner, I think the director's cut by Ridley Scott simply plays much better. I also turned around on Groundhog Day, which made it into this book when I belatedly caught on that it wasn't about the weatherman's predicament but about the nature of time and will. Perhaps when I first saw it I allowed myself to be distracted by Bill Murray's mainstream comedy reputation. But someone in film school somewhere is probably even now writing a thesis about how Murray's famous cameos represent an injection of philosophy into those pictures.

In the first Great Movies, he wrote:

Movies do not change, but their viewers do. When I first saw La Dolce Vita in 1961, I was an adolescent for whom "the sweet life" represented everything I dreamed of: sin, exotic European glamour, the weary romance of the cynical newspaperman. When I saw it again, around 1970, I was living in a version of Marcello's world; Chicago's North Avenue was not the Via Veneto, but at 3 A. M. the denizens were just as colorful, and I was about Marcello's age.

When I saw the movie around 1980, Marcello was the same age, but I was ten years older, had stopped drinking, and saw him not as role model, but as a victim, condemned to an endless search for happiness that could never be found, not that way. By 1991, when I analyzed the film a frame at a time at the University of Colorado, Marcello seemed younger still, and while I had once admired and then criticized him, now I pitied and loved him. And when I saw the movie right after Mastroianni died, I thought that Fellini and Marcello had taken a moment of discovery and made it immortal. There may be no such thing as the sweet life. But it is necessary to find that out for yourself.

== Preferences ==
=== Favorites ===
==== Siskel ====
For Siskel, one of his favorite films was Saturday Night Fever; he even bought the famous white disco suit that John Travolta wore in the film from a charity auction. Another all-time favorite was Dr. Strangelove. A favorite from childhood was Dumbo, which he often mentioned as the first film that had an influence on him.

==== Ebert ====
For Ebert, in an essay looking back at his first 25 years as a film critic, he stated:

If I had to make a generalization, I would say that many of my favorite movies are about Good People ... Casablanca is about people who do the right thing. The Third Man is about people who do the right thing and can never speak to one another as a result ... Not all good movies are about Good People. I also like movies about bad people who have a sense of humor. Orson Welles, who does not play either of the good people in The Third Man, has such a winning way, such witty dialogue, that for a scene or two we almost forgive him his crimes. Henry Hill, the hero of Goodfellas, is not a good fella, but he has the ability to be honest with us about why he enjoyed being bad. He is not a hypocrite.

Of the other movies I love, some are simply about the joy of physical movement. When Gene Kelly splashes through Singin' in the Rain, when Judy Garland follows the yellow brick road, when Fred Astaire dances on the ceiling, when John Wayne puts the reins in his teeth and gallops across the mountain meadow, there is a purity and joy that cannot be resisted. In Equinox Flower, a Japanese film by the old master Yasujirō Ozu, there is this sequence of shots: A room with a red teapot in the foreground. Another view of the room. The mother folding clothes. A shot down a corridor with a mother crossing it at an angle, and then a daughter crossing at the back. A reverse shot in the hallway as the arriving father is greeted by the mother and daughter. A shot as the father leaves the frame, then the mother, then the daughter. A shot as the mother and father enter the room, as in the background the daughter picks up the red pot and leaves the frame. This sequence of timed movement and cutting is as perfect as any music ever written, any dance, any poem.

Ebert credits film historian Donald Richie and the Hawaii International Film Festival for introducing him to Asian cinema through Richie's invitation to join him on the jury of the festival in 1983, which quickly became a favorite of his and would frequently attend along with Richie, lending their support to validate the festival's status as a "festival of record". He lamented the decline of campus film societies: "There was once a time when young people made it their business to catch up on the best works by the best directors, but the death of film societies and repertory theaters put an end to that, and for today's younger filmgoers, these are not well-known names: Buñuel, Fellini, Bergman, Ford, Kurosawa, Ray, Renoir, Lean, Bresson, Wilder, Welles. Most people still know who Hitchcock was, I guess."

Ebert argued for the aesthetic values of black-and-white photography and against colorization, writing:

Black-and-white movies present the deliberate absence of color. This makes them less realistic than color films (for the real world is in color). They are more dreamlike, more pure, composed of shapes and forms and movements and light and shadow. Color films can simply be illuminated. Black-and-white films have to be lighted ... Black and white is a legitimate and beautiful artistic choice in motion pictures, creating feelings and effects that cannot be obtained any other way.

He wrote: "Black-and-white (or, more accurately, silver-and-white) creates a mysterious dream state, a simpler world of form and gesture. Most people do not agree with me. They like color and think a black-and-white film is missing something. Try this. If you have wedding photographs of your parents and grandparents, chances are your parents are in color and your grandparents are in black and white. Put the two photographs side by side and consider them honestly. Your grandparents look timeless. Your parents look goofy.

The next time you buy film for your camera, buy a roll of black-and-white. Go outside at dusk, when the daylight is diffused. Stand on the side of the house away from the sunset. Shoot some natural-light closeups of a friend. Have the pictures printed big, at least 5 x 7. Ask yourself if this friend, who has always looked ordinary in every color photograph you've ever taken, does not suddenly, in black and white, somehow take on an aura of mystery. The same thing happens in the movies."

Ebert championed animation, particularly the films of Hayao Miyazaki and Isao Takahata. In his review of Miyazaki's Princess Mononoke, he wrote: "I go to the movies for many reasons. Here is one of them. I want to see wondrous sights not available in the real world, in stories where myth and dreams are set free to play. Animation opens that possibility, because it is freed from gravity and the chains of the possible. Realistic films show the physical world; animation shows its essence. Animated films are not copies of 'real movies,' are not shadows of reality, but create a new existence in their own right." He concluded his review of Ratatouille by writing: "Every time an animated film is successful, you have to read all over again about how animation isn't 'just for children' but 'for the whole family,' and 'even for adults going on their own.' No kidding!"

Ebert championed documentaries, notably Errol Morris's Gates of Heaven: "They say you can make a great documentary about anything, as long as you see it well enough and truly, and this film proves it. Gates of Heaven, which has no connection to the unfortunate Heaven's Gate, is about a couple of pet cemeteries and their owners. It was filmed in Southern California, so of course we expect a sardonic look at the peculiarities of the Moonbeam State. But then Gates of Heaven grows ever so much more complex and frightening, until at the end it is about such large issues as love, immortality, failure, and the dogged elusiveness of the American Dream." Morris credited Ebert's review with putting him on the map. He championed Michael Apted's Up films, calling them "an inspired, even noble use of the medium." Ebert concluded his review of Hoop Dreams by writing: "Many filmgoers are reluctant to see documentaries, for reasons I've never understood; the good ones are frequently more absorbing and entertaining than fiction. Hoop Dreams, however, is not only documentary. It is also poetry and prose, muckraking and expose, journalism and polemic. It is one of the great moviegoing experiences of my lifetime."

If a movie can illuminate the lives of other people who share this planet with us and show us not only how different they are but, how even so, they share the same dreams and hurts, then it deserves to be called great.

— Ebert, 1986

Ebert said that his favorite film was Citizen Kane, joking, "That's the official answer," although he preferred to emphasize it as "the most important" film. He said seeing The Third Man cemented his love of cinema: "This movie is on the altar of my love for the cinema. I saw it for the first time in a little fleabox of a theater on the Left Bank in Paris, in 1962, during my first $5 a day trip to Europe. It was so sad, so beautiful, so romantic, that it became at once a part of my own memories — as if it had happened to me." He implied that his real favorite film was La Dolce Vita.

His favorite actor was Robert Mitchum and his favorite actress was Ingrid Bergman. He named Buster Keaton, Yasujirō Ozu, Robert Altman, Werner Herzog and Martin Scorsese as his favorite directors. He expressed his distaste for "top-10" lists, and all movie lists in general, but did make an annual list of the year's best films, joking that film critics are "required by unwritten law" to do so. He also contributed an all-time top-10 list for the decennial Sight & Sound Critics' poll in 1982, 1992, 2002 and 2012. In 1982, he chose, alphabetically, 2001: A Space Odyssey, Aguirre, the Wrath of God, Bonnie and Clyde, Casablanca, Citizen Kane, La Dolce Vita, Notorious, Persona, Taxi Driver and The Third Man. In 2012, he chose 2001: A Space Odyssey, Aguirre, the Wrath of God, Apocalypse Now, Citizen Kane, La Dolce Vita, The General, Raging Bull, Tokyo Story, The Tree of Life and Vertigo. Several of the contributors to Ebert's website participated in a video tribute to him, featuring films that made his Sight & Sound list in 1982 and 2012.

=== Best films of the year ===
As critics, Siskel's first top ten list was in 1969; Ebert's had debuted in 1967. Over the life of their partnership, these were the two critics' #1 selections.

Year	Siskel	Ebert
1969	Z	
1970	My Night at Maud's	Five Easy Pieces
1971	Claire's Knee	The Last Picture Show
1972	The Godfather	
1973	The Emigrants	Cries and Whispers
1974	Day for Night	Scenes from a Marriage
1975	Nashville	
1976	All the President's Men	Small Change
1977	Annie Hall	3 Women
1978	Straight Time	An Unmarried Woman
1979	Hair	Apocalypse Now
1980	Raging Bull	The Black Stallion
1981	Ragtime	My Dinner with Andre
1982	Moonlighting	Sophie's Choice
1983	The Right Stuff	
1984	Once Upon a Time in America	Amadeus
1985	Shoah	The Color Purple
1986	Hannah and Her Sisters	Platoon
1987	The Last Emperor	House of Games
1988	The Last Temptation of Christ	Mississippi Burning
1989	Do the Right Thing	
1990	GoodFellas	
1991	Hearts of Darkness	JFK
1992	One False Move	Malcolm X
1993	Schindler's List	
1994	Hoop Dreams	
1995	Crumb	Leaving Las Vegas
1996	Fargo	
1997	The Ice Storm	Eve's Bayou
1998	Babe: Pig in the City	Dark City

Previously, Siskel and Ebert had separately agreed on Z and The Godfather before sharing the same opinion on Nashville, The Right Stuff, Do the Right Thing, GoodFellas, Schindler's List, Hoop Dreams, and Fargo.

Seven times, Siskel's #1 choice did not appear on Ebert's top ten list at all: Straight Time, Ragtime, Once Upon a Time in America, Shoah, The Last Temptation of Christ, Hearts of Darkness, and The Ice Storm. Eight times, Ebert's top selection did not appear on Siskel's; these films were Small Change, 3 Women, An Unmarried Woman, Apocalypse Now, Sophie's Choice, Mississippi Burning, Eve's Bayou, and Dark City. In 1985, Ebert declined to rank the Holocaust documentary Shoah as 1985's best film because he felt it was inappropriate to compare it to the rest of the year's candidates.

While Apocalypse Now appeared as Ebert's choice for best film of 1979 but not anywhere on Siskel's list, the documentary of the making of the film, Hearts of Darkness, was Siskel's choice for the best film of 1991 while not appearing on Ebert's list.

In addition, neither critic's choice for the best film of 1988 (The Last Temptation of Christ for Siskel and Mississippi Burning for Ebert) appeared anywhere on the other critic's list, but both starred Willem Dafoe.

== Advocacy ==
The pair also advocated for up-and-coming filmmakers including Martin Scorsese, Spike Lee, Steve James, Quentin Tarantino, Jane Campion, Michael Moore and Werner Herzog. For example, in 1981, Siskel and Ebert had viewed Errol Morris' Gates of Heaven (1978) and reviewed the film twice on separate episodes on Sneak Previews. They later placed the film on their lists for the best films of 1981.

In 1990, they interviewed Scorsese, George Lucas, and Steven Spielberg on a special titled "The Future of the Movies", highlighting the importance of film preservation. They later transcribed their interviews into a companion book of the same title, becoming the only book jointly written by them.

They especially decried the lack of an Academy Award for Best Picture for Lee's Do the Right Thing (1989), and James' Hoop Dreams (1994).

== Appearances ==
Siskel and Ebert were known for their many appearances on late-night talk shows including appearing on The Late Show with David Letterman sixteen times and The Tonight Show Starring Johnny Carson fifteen times. They also appeared together on The Oprah Winfrey Show, The Arsenio Hall Show, Howard Stern, The Tonight Show with Jay Leno, and Late Night with Conan O'Brien.

Normally, Siskel and Ebert would refuse to guest-star in movies or television series, as they felt it would undermine their "responsibility to the public." However, they both "could not resist" appearing on an episode of the animated television series The Critic, the title character of which was a film-critic who hosted a television show. In the episode, entitled "Siskel & Ebert & Jay & Alice" (which aired in 1995), Siskel and Ebert split and each wants Jay Sherman, the eponymous film critic, as his new partner. The episode is a parody of the film Sleepless in Seattle.

They also appeared as themselves on Saturday Night Live three times, 1982, 1983, and 1985. They appeared in the episode "Chevy Chase/Queen" (1982) where they reviewed sketches from the night's telecast.

In 1991, Siskel, along with Ebert, appeared in a segment on the children's television series Sesame Street entitled "Sneak Peek Previews" (a parody of Sneak Previews). In the segment, the critics instruct the hosts Oscar the Grouch and Telly Monster on how their thumbs up/thumbs down rating system works. Oscar asks if there could be a thumbs sideways ratings, and goads the two men into an argument about whether or not that would be acceptable, as Ebert likes the idea, but Siskel does not. The two were also seen that same year in the show's celebrity version of "Monster in the Mirror".

=== Siskel appearances ===
In 1993, Siskel appeared as himself in an episode of The Larry Sanders Show entitled "Off Camera". Entertainment Weekly chose his performance as one of the great scenes in that year's television.

=== Ebert appearances ===
Ebert provided DVD audio commentaries for Citizen Kane (1941), Casablanca (1942), Beyond the Valley of the Dolls (1970) and Dark City (1998). For the Criterion Collection, he recorded commentaries for Floating Weeds (1959) and Crumb (1994), the latter with director Terry Zwigoff. Ebert was also interviewed by Central Park Media for an extra feature on the DVD release of Grave of the Fireflies (1988).

In 1997, Ebert appeared in Pitch, a documentary by Spencer Rice and Kenny Hotz and the Chicago-set television series Early Edition, where consoles a young boy who is depressed after he sees the character Bosco the Bunny die in a movie. Ebert made a cameo in Abby Singer (2003). In 2004, Ebert appeared in Sesame Street's direct-to-video special A Celebration of Me, Grover, delivering a review of the Monsterpiece Theater segment "The King and I". Ebert was one of the principal critics featured in Gerald Peary's 2009 documentary For the Love of Movies: The Story of American Film Criticism. He discusses the dynamics of appearing with Gene Siskel on the 1970s show Coming to a Theatre Near You, the predecessor of Sneak Previews on Chicago PBS station WTTW, and expresses approval of the proliferation of young people writing film reviews today on the internet. On October 22, 2010, Ebert appeared with Robert Osborne on Turner Classic Movies during their "The Essentials" series. Ebert selected Sweet Smell of Success (1957) and The Lady Eve (1941).

== Legacy ==
In November 2025, the Chicago Cultural Center scheduled a series of events to mark the 50th anniversary of the Siskel and Ebert partnership. The films screened (which were screened every Wednesday) were Eve's Bayou, Breaking Away, Drugstore Cowboy, and Lone Star.

=== In popular culture ===
In 1987, their review show was spoofed in a skit in the film Hollywood Shuffle.

In 1989, a reference to the duo was heard in the film, Police Academy 6: City Under Siege. At one point during a high speed chase, Captain Harris shouts: "Look out for Gene and Roger's fruit stand!" This was because Siskel and Ebert hated both the cliché of fruit stands being destroyed in movie car chases and the Police Academy film series.

In 1993, Siskel and Ebert were satirized on the popular Nickelodeon series Doug in the episode "Doug's Monster Movie" in which they appear in a dream sequence and vote two thumbs down on Doug's home movie.

The 1993 episode of Animaniacs, "Critical Condition", featured a parody of Siskel & Ebert, with their names parodied as Lean Hisskill & Codger Eggbert. The characters were voiced by Maurice LaMarche and Chuck McCann (later Billy West), respectively.

The 1998 film, Godzilla, featured characters based on the duo. The Mayor of New York City, Mayor Ebert, is portrayed by Michael Lerner, and Gene, the mayor's aide, is played by Lorry Goldman. During the film, Gene resigns from working for Mayor Ebert by giving him a 'thumbs down' gesture. Of the characters, Ebert pointed out in his review that the characters were producer Dean Devlin and director Roland Emmerich's jabs at his and Gene Siskel's negative reviews of Stargate and Independence Day. Gene Siskel particularly singled out this aspect, saying, "If you're going to go through the trouble of putting us in a monster movie, why don't you at least take the advantage of having the monster either eat or squash us?" Ebert gave the film one-and-a-half stars out of four. Siskel placed the film on his list of the worst films of 1998.

The 1999 song The Bad Touch references the show in the first verse: 'Yes, I'm Siskel, yes I'm Ebert and you're getting two thumbs up'

== Accolades ==
Siskel and Ebert received a Chicago Emmy Award for Outstanding Special Program in 1979. They also received seven Primetime Emmy Award nominations for Outstanding Informational Series. They also received three Daytime Emmy Award for Outstanding Special Class Series from 1989 to 1991.

== Bibliography ==
- Singer, Matt (2023). Opposable Thumbs: How Siskel & Ebert Changed Movies Forever. Penguin. ISBN 978-0-59354-015-2.
