= Big Bird's Birthday or Let Me Eat Cake =

1991 children's television special

- Based on: Sesame Street by Joan Ganz Cooney and Lloyd Morrisett
- Written by: Judy Freudberg
- Directed by: Jon Stone
- Country of origin: United States
- Original language: English

Production
- Executive producer: Dulcy Singer
- Production company: Children's Television Workshop

Original release
- Network: PBS
- Release: March 9, 1991

Related
- Sesame Street, Special; Sesame Street Jam: A Musical Celebration

Big Bird's Birthday or Let Me Eat Cake is a 1991 television special based on the children's television show Sesame Street. In the special, Big Bird celebrates his sixth birthday. The special aired on PBS stations during the week of March 9, 1991 as part of the PBS pledge drive season. On March 15, the special was re-aired as the Sesame Street episode "2835", with additional inserts from previous episodes added and the pledge break scene removed.

== Plot ==
Snuffy visits Big Bird's nest in the morning so he can be the first to wish Big Bird a happy birthday. During the opening credits, the two head out down the street as Big Bird's friends wish him a happy birthday, then everyone sings about "Big Bird's Beautiful Birthday Bash" in the arbor. The Monsterpiece Theater sketch "The King and I" is repeated from a previous episode. Big Bird and his friends will go to the Wollman Rink in Central Park for his skating party, and Maria and Susan will stay behind to decorate. Snuffy also wants to stay behind because he doesn't know how to roller skate, so Big Bird will teach him how to skate. Robin Williams shows Elmo the fun things he can do with a stick. Everyone enjoys skating at the rink, but Snuffy is not sure he wants to learn how to skate because he fears falling. Big Bird is finally able to convince Snuffy to learn, until someone falls in front of them. The song "We Are All Earthlings" follows. Maria and Susan lay out Big Bird's cake, then go to their apartments to find more chairs. Cookie Monster finds Big Bird's cake and realizes he can't eat it, so he finds other things to eat, starting with the chairs and the table. Grover sings "Monster in the Mirror" along with several celebrities. Monster on the Spot reporter Telly Monster asks if The Count will support his public television station. The Count recites a long list of reasons why, leading to a pledge break.

Snuffy, still afraid of falling, tries to leave the rink. Telly asks Luis where Oscar the Grouch is. Oscar and Bruno are skating at the party because he loves falling down when skating. Bruno skates around without falling, but the skating made Oscar dizzy. Whoopi Goldberg and Hoots the Owl talk about being proud of their body parts. Big Bird impresses Snuffy with a rollerskating routine, but he can't skate like Big Bird. Big Bird and friends sing "Put One Foot in Front of the Other", which helps Snuffy skate around the rink. Cookie Monster has eaten everything around him, and when Susan and Maria come back, they take the cake away from him. The Oinker Sisters sing "A New Way to Walk", repeated from a previous episode. Everyone returns to the street and notices that almost everything has been eaten. Big Bird's friends give him his cake, sing "Happy Birthday To You", and then Big Bird blows out all the candles for his birthday wish. The credits begin as the cake is cut, but stop when Maria wonders where Cookie Monster is; he eats his slice of cake, and the sponsors for dessert. The credits continue as everyone skates at the rink.

== Cast ==
- Alison Bartlett as Gina
- Linda Bove as Linda
- Emilio Delgado as Luis
- Loretta Long as Susan
- Sonia Manzano as Maria
- Bill McCutcheon as Uncle Wally
- Bob McGrath as Bob
- Roscoe Orman as Gordon
- Ward Saxton as Mike
- David Smyrl as Mr. Handford
- Lillias White as Lillian
- Alexis Cruz as Alex

=== Muppet performers ===
- Caroll Spinney as Big Bird, Oscar the Grouch and Bruno the Trashman
- Frank Oz as Cookie Monster, Bert, and Grover
- Fran Brill as Prairie Dawn and Little Bird
- Jerry Nelson as Count von Count, Herry Monster, Boy and Two-Headed Monster (left head)
- Kevin Clash as Elmo, Hoots the Owl, and Wolfgang the Seal
- Richard Hunt as Forgetful Jones, and Two-Headed Monster (right head)
- Martin P. Robinson as Mr. Snuffleupagus, Telly, Fish and Buster the Horse
- David Rudman as Athena and Chicago the Lion
- Fred Garbo Garver as Barkley
- Judy Sladky as Alice Snuffleupagus
- Camille Bonora as Ruby
- Pam Arciero as Telly (assistant)
- Bryant Young as Mr. Snuffleupagus (assistant)
- Jim Martin as Goat
- Additional Muppets performed by Rick Lyon, Joseph Mazzarino, Carmen Osbahr

=== Special guest stars ===
- Maria Conchita Alonzo
- Candice Bergen
- Nancy Cartwright as Bart Simpson
- Dan Castellaneta as Homer Simpson
- Ray Charles
- Chubby Checker
- Glenn Close
- Tess Daly
- Geena Davis
- Bo Diddley
- Roger Ebert
- Charlayne Hunter-Gault
- Whoopi Goldberg
- Jeff Goldblum
- Kadeem Hardison
- Bo Jackson
- Julie Kavner as Marge Simpson
- Kid 'n Play
- Robert MacNeil
- Lou Diamond Phillips
- Julia Roberts
- Gene Siskel
- Jeff Smith
- Yeardley Smith as Lisa Simpson
- Tracey Ullman
- Blair Underwood
- Malcolm-Jamal Warner
- Robin Williams
