= Big Bird in Japan =

1989 film by Jon Stone

- Written by: Jon Stone
- Directed by: Jon Stone
- Starring: Caroll Spinney; Maiko Kawakami
- Narrated by: Pat Morita (The Tale of the Bamboo Cutter)
- Music by: Tony Geiss; Carol Hall; Dick Lieb
- Countries of origin: United States; Japan
- Original languages: English; Japanese

Production
- Producer: Sonia Rosario
- Cinematography: Edward Colman (director of photography) (uncredited)
- Editor: Ilene Merenstein
- Running time: 60 minutes
- Production company: Children's Television Workshop

Original release
- Network: NHK
- Release: November 3, 1988
- Network: PBS
- Release: January 16, 1989

Big Bird in Japan is a television special by the Children's Television Workshop (now Sesame Workshop), that aired on NHK General TV on November 3, 1988, and on PBS on January 16, 1989. It is the sequel to Big Bird in China which was also based on the popular television series Sesame Street. It depicts Big Bird and Barkley visiting some Japanese guests, counting to 3 in Japanese and teaching Japanese words. This television special was filmed in Kyoto and Tokyo in 1988. Backed by significant funding from Japanese corporations, the program was produced with the help of NHK.

== Plot ==
Separated from their guided tour group while in Japan, Big Bird and Barkley find help from a friendly but mysterious young woman who is planning to leave Japan at the same time they will be, and from the same town, Kyoto. She offers to take the pair to Kyoto as she says goodbye to family and friends along the way.

Big Bird witnesses some of Japan's beauty, its landscape and culture, with the help of the young woman and the friends of hers he stays with. She introduces him to a Japanese family, and teaches him some simple Japanese vocabulary (e.g. ohayō (おはよう) = "good morning"). Big Bird is increasingly vexed by his not having learned the young woman's name, and that she has a tendency to have disappeared quite suddenly when he turns to speak to her. One night, finding difficulty in sleeping on a futon, he happens to catch sight of her standing in the garden, singing an achingly melancholy song to the Moon.

Attending an elementary school on the day he, Barkley and their mysterious helper are supposed to leave on the Shinkansen for Kyoto, Big Bird is treated to The Tale of the Bamboo Cutter as acted out by some of the students. One of the highlights of the special, Big Bird (and the viewing audience) learns the story of Kaguya-hime, a young girl found in a shining bamboo stump, who later reveals herself as a magical princess to her adopted family. She then must return to the Moon and leave her adoptive family behind.

Big Bird and Barkley arrive at the Shinkansen station almost too late, and their worried companion scolds them lightly once they're on board. Once they disembark, she orders them to stay put so that they don't get lost and miss meeting up with their tour. But Big Bird and Barkley are much too intrigued by their surroundings, and end up at the Sanjusangendo Temple. Barkley becomes frightened by the statues inside and runs away, with a distraught Big Bird in pursuit.

Long after dark, Big Bird returns to the spot where their young guide had told them to stay. Finding her there, he apologizes in shame, explaining what happened. The young woman forgives Big Bird, and reveals that she has found Barkley and also located their tour, which is now certain to wait for the wayward pair. Big Bird, trying to find the words to thank her, says that he doesn't even know her name. Her name is revealed to be Kaguya-hime, their guide says softly.

After their last thank yous and goodbyes, Big Bird suddenly recalls where he'd heard the name before, and rushes off to find her. However, Kaguya-hime is walking, trance-like, through the deep green of a bamboo forest. Seven imposing men in 10th century garb enter from all sides. To chilling effect, they are colorless. They surround her, and upon drawing back, reveal a young girl in jūnihitoe (ceremonial costume). She turns colorless as well, and the procession marches slowly from the clearing to the movie's most majestic music.

Big Bird and Barkley arrive on the scene, seeing no one else. Big Bird convinces himself that he was just being silly, thinking the friendly young woman really could be the Bamboo Princess. Safely in a plane going home to Sesame Street, Big Bird reminisces on everything he has learned during his adventure, while through Big Bird's window, unseen, Kaguya-hime's procession walks in stately elegance across the face of the full moon. As the closing credits roll, the bamboo forest is revisited, and the shining bamboo stump that Kaguya-hime had come from is revealed.

== Cast ==
- Caroll Spinney as Big Bird
- Brian Muehl as Barkley
- Maiko Kawakami as Kaguya-hime
- Pat Morita as the narrator of The Tale of the Bamboo Cutter
- Yoko Haruta as the tour guide
- Mariko Hirano as Mariko Shimuzu
- Akiko Nemoto as Akiko Shimuzu
- Masayuki Katō (加藤正之) as the restaurant manager
- Akira Murayama (村山明) as Mr. Shimizu
- Kumiko Hironaka (弘中くみ子)
- Hikojiro Matsumura (松村彦次郎) as Grandfather
- Fukami Harue (春江ふかみ) as Grandmother

== Impact and reception ==
Big Bird in Japan is considered noteworthy in folkloric studies for introducing The Tale of the Bamboo Cutter to audiences outside Japan. The special has been praised for its respectful use of humor and parody, giving 1980s American children and adults an overview of everyday life in bubble-era Japan that was starkly different from the media's fixation on Japanese corporate culture.
