= Monster in the Mirror =

1989 song used in Sesame Street

"Monster in the Mirror" is a song performed by Grover, a Muppet character from the PBS television series Sesame Street. Copyrighted in 1989, the song was composed by Christopher Cerf and Norman Stiles.

In the song, Grover first sees a monster in the mirror before realizing the monster is himself, a theme repeated from the 1971 book The Monster at the End of This Book: Starring Lovable, Furry Old Grover. A music video for the song premiered in 1991 in the television special Big Bird's Birthday or Let Me Eat Cake, featuring 25 celebrities including Ray Charles, Robin Williams, Whoopi Goldberg, Julia Roberts, and the Simpson family.

Los Angeles Times reviewer David Zurawik called the celebrity music video "the happiest two minutes of film that I've ever seen".

== History ==
"Monster in the Mirror" was composed by Christopher Cerf and Norman Stiles and copyrighted in 1989. Dulcy Singer, the executive producer of Sesame Street, said in a 1990 interview with United Press International that the song is about Grover's noticing a monster in the mirror before figuring out the monster is himself. The song revisits a theme in the 1971 book The Monster at the End of This Book: Starring Lovable, Furry Old Grover, where Grover, saying "I'm so embarrassed!", realizes he is that monster at the end of the book.

Directed by Laura Di Trapani and produced by Jim Blashfield, a music video accompanying the song premiered at a skating rink at New York City's Central Park in March 1991 for the television special Big Bird's Birthday or Let Me Eat Cake. The music video featured 25 celebrities including Robin Williams, Candice Bergen, Whoopi Goldberg, Julia Roberts, the Simpson family, Ray Charles, Chubby Checker, Tyne Daly, Bo Jackson, Glenn Close, Lou Diamond Phillips, Malcolm-Jamal Warner, Jeff Goldblum, Geena Davis, Tracey Ullman, Tim Robbins, Kadeem Hardison, Jeff Smith, Robert MacNeil, and Charlayne Hunter-Gault.

The song appeared in the 1993 video Sesame Street's 25th Birthday: A Musical Celebration. "Monster in the Mirror" was one of the songs in the 1995 album "Sesame Street: Platinum All-Time Favorites" and the 2003 album Songs from the Street: 35 Years of Music.

One of the song's refrains is "Wubba Wubba Woo". In September 2002, First Lady Laura Bush appeared on Sesame Street and read a book called Wubba, Wubba, Woo! to Big Bird, Elmo, and several children to promote children's literacy.

== Analysis ==
Maureen Turim in the 2000 book Psychoanalyses / Feminisms wrote that the song is about a baby happening upon a monster in the mirror. After a few of the song's verses, the monster's intense stare becomes less fierce. Turim said that the verses move from "the transliteration of babytalk" ("Wabba wabba wabba wabba woo woo woo") to "recognizable English phonemes" ("I will wabba you and you will wabba me"). She interpreted the latter verse as being babytalk for "I will love you if you will love me". She wrote that "Violence, proxemics, and touch are hinted at when the monster's 'wabba' seems to become meaningfully transitive and even aggressive, sounding like a threatening 'rubba'."

The music video accompanying the song features a collection of scenes from popular culture in television. The scenes are not only from PBS shows or children's shows but also from shows for older viewers. Turim said that one interpretation of this is that Sesame Street is telling viewers "This is you, your mirror, your culture, never first or last, but in one looping, eternally present surround. This is how you will learn to see, to speak, to move, and to love—watch and learn".

In the 2008 book Monster Boss, Patricia King wrote in a chapter titled "The Monster in Your Mirror: You're Scaring Your Employees" that Grover "croons about how he tamed the monster in the mirror with kindness". She said that managers can sometimes be both "a monster boss's victim" and "some other victim's monster boss". King concluded that "Grover's song has a point. In good management practice, kindness is a good place to start."

== Reception ==
Maria Bartholdi on Twin Cities PBS's Rewire website called "Monster in the Mirror" one of the "Top 10 Greatest Sesame Street Musical Moments" and said "It is impossible not to dance to this catchy number!" She said the song has "the deeper message of being the change you'd like to see in the world". David Zurawik of the Los Angeles Times called the "Monster in the Mirror" "unforgettable" because of the "Wubba, wubba, wubba, wubba, woo" chorus and the celebrity music video "the happiest two minutes of film that I've ever seen". David Whitehouse of The Guardian said "Monster in the Mirror" gave viewers "the classic Ray Charles duet with the Cookie Monster".
