= Mustapha Khan =

American film and television director

- Born: United States
- Occupation(s): Film director, producer

Mustapha Khan is an American film and television director, best known for such films and television shows as Imagining America, Rocksteady, Sesame Street and The Electric Company.

The son of a Caribbean immigrant, Khan graduated in 1980 from Moorestown Friends School. He graduated from Harvard University in 1984.

He won a 1992 Daytime Emmy for his Sesame Street short film Dancing Shoes and also obtained a Primetime Emmy nomination for work on Sesame Street Jam: A Musical Celebration.
