= Jon Stone =

American writer, television producer and director

- Born: Jon Arthur Stone; April 13, 1931; New Haven, Connecticut, U.S.
- Died: March 30, 1997 (aged 65); New York City
- Education: Williams College (BA); Yale University (MFA)
- Occupations: Screenwriter; television director; producer; children's author
- Spouse: Beverley Owen (m. 1964; div. 1974)
- Children: 2

Jon Arthur Stone (April 13, 1931 – March 30, 1997) was an American television screenwriter, director, producer, and chlidren's author who was best known as an original crewmember on the children's television show Sesame Street. He is credited with helping to develop characters such as Cookie Monster, Oscar the Grouch and Big Bird. Stone won 18 television Emmy Awards and is regarded as one of the best children's television writers.

== Biography ==
Stone was born on April 13, 1931, in New Haven, Connecticut to a physician. He attended Pomfret School and entered Williams College, graduating in 1952. Three years later, Stone received a master's degree from the Yale University School of Drama and joined a CBS training program. He began his work in children's television as a writer for Captain Kangaroo. Stone also worked on Kukla, Fran and Ollie before moving to Sesame Street as a writer and producer. Before and during his time on Sesame Street, Stone also worked on several other Muppets projects.

Stone wrote several children's books, including The Monster at the End of This Book, published by Random House as a Little Golden Book.

== Producing and writing ==
Stone's became associated with Jim Henson in the early 1960s, working on fairy-tale projects with writer Tom Whedon, such as a proposed Snow White series. The idea led to the filming of an unaired Cinderella pilot that eventually became Hey, Cinderella!. Stone also appeared in Henson's 1967 short film Ripples as an introspective architect.

In 1968, Stone brought Henson and Joe Raposo (who had also worked on Hey, Cinderella!) to the attention of Children's Television Workshop president Joan Ganz Cooney as she was planning the show that would become Sesame Street. Stone wrote the pilot script at the request of Cooney, despite his initial reluctance as he had intended to leave television. He was one of the three original producers of the program and later served as an executive producer for many years.

Stone also wrote specials, including Big Bird in China and Big Bird in Japan.

== Directing ==
Stone was the director of Sesame Street until 1996. He also directed the 1995 Christmas special Mr. Willowby's Christmas Tree and Don't Eat the Pictures, a special that brought Sesame Street to the Metropolitan Museum of Art and won the Prix Jeunesse International.

== Personal life ==
Stone was married to former actress Beverley Owen. They had two daughters before divorcing in 1974.

Stone died in New York on March 30, 1997, of amyotrophic lateral sclerosis, two weeks before his 66th birthday. A memorial bench dedicated to Stone was installed on the Literary Walk in Central Park, directly to the right of a bench dedicated to Jim Henson. In Stone's New York Times obituary, Joan Ganz Cooney described him as "probably the most brilliant writer of children's television material in America." Season 29 of Sesame Street was dedicated in his memory.
