= Caroll Spinney =

American puppeteer (1933–2019)

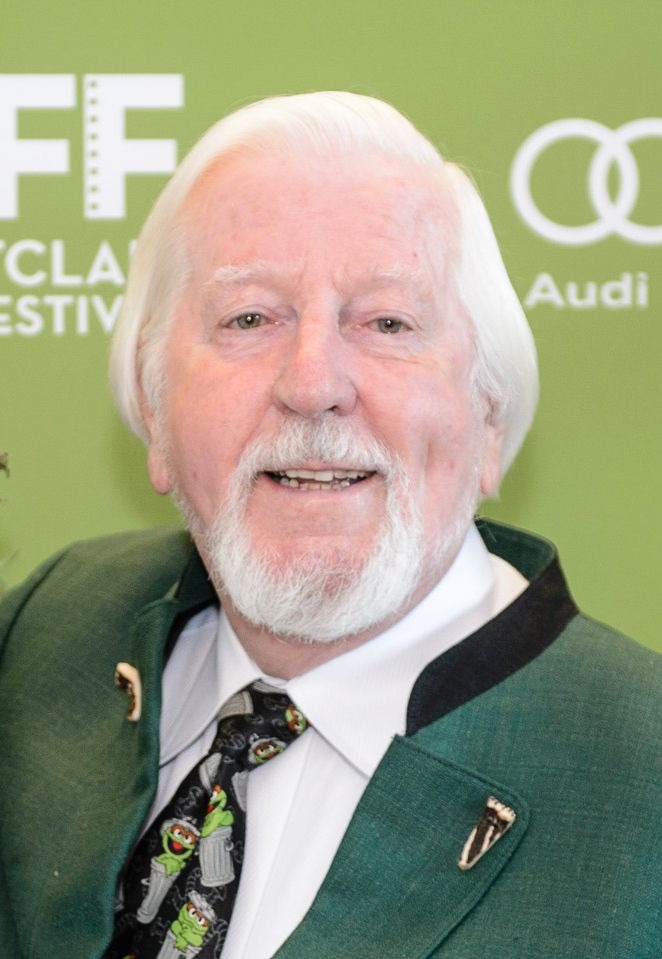
- Spinney in 2014
- Born: Caroll Edwin Spinney; December 26, 1933; Waltham, Massachusetts, U.S.
- Died: December 8, 2019 (aged 85); Woodstock, Connecticut, U.S.
- Resting place: Spinney Family Cemetery, Woodstock, Connecticut, U.S.
- Other name: Ed Spinney
- Occupations: Puppeteer; cartoonist; author; artist; speaker
- Years active: 1955–2018
- Spouses: Janice Spinney (m. 1960; div. 1971); Debra Jean Gilroy (m. 1979)
- Children: 3
- Website: www.carollspinney.com

Caroll Edwin Spinney (December 26, 1933 – December 8, 2019) was an American puppeteer, cartoonist, author, artist and speaker, most famous for playing Big Bird and Oscar the Grouch on Sesame Street from its inception in 1969 until 2018.

== Early life ==
Spinney was born in Waltham, Massachusetts, on December 26, 1933, to Chester and Margaret Spinney. He had two older brothers, Donald and David. His mother, a native of Bolton, England, named him Caroll despite him being male because he was born the day after Christmas. He drew and painted from childhood, and developed a love of puppeteering when he saw a performance of "Three Little Kittens" at the age of five. This motivated him to purchase a monkey puppet from a rummage sale three years later and put on a puppet show utilizing the monkey and a plush snake. The following Christmas, his mother gave him a Punch and Judy puppet theater. He continued puppeteering throughout his childhood and adolescence and used his performances to raise money for college tuition.

After he graduated from Acton High School (subsequently Acton-Boxborough Regional High School) in Acton, Massachusetts, Spinney served in the U.S. Air Force.

== Career ==
=== Comics and cartoons ===
While in the Air Force, Spinney wrote and illustrated Harvey, a comic strip about military life. He also animated a series of black-and-white cartoons called Crazy Crayon.

=== Early puppeteering ===
In 1955, Spinney relocated to Las Vegas, where he performed in the show Rascal Rabbit. He returned to Boston, joining The Judy and Goggle Show in 1958 as a puppeteer "Goggle" to Judy Valentine's Judy. Throughout the 1960s, he performed on the Boston broadcast of Bozo's Big Top, where he played various costumed characters which included Flip Flop the Rag Doll, Mr. Rabbit, Kookie the Boxing Kangaroo as well as Mr. Lion, who created cartoon drawings from the names of children participating in the show. Through that decade, he was also a commercial artist and animator.

Spinney created a puppet duo consisting of two cats named Picklepuss and Pop, which he utilized throughout the 1960s. Many years later, Spinney's Picklepuss and Pop puppets were characters in Wow, You're a Cartoonist!

=== As a Sesame Street puppeteer ===
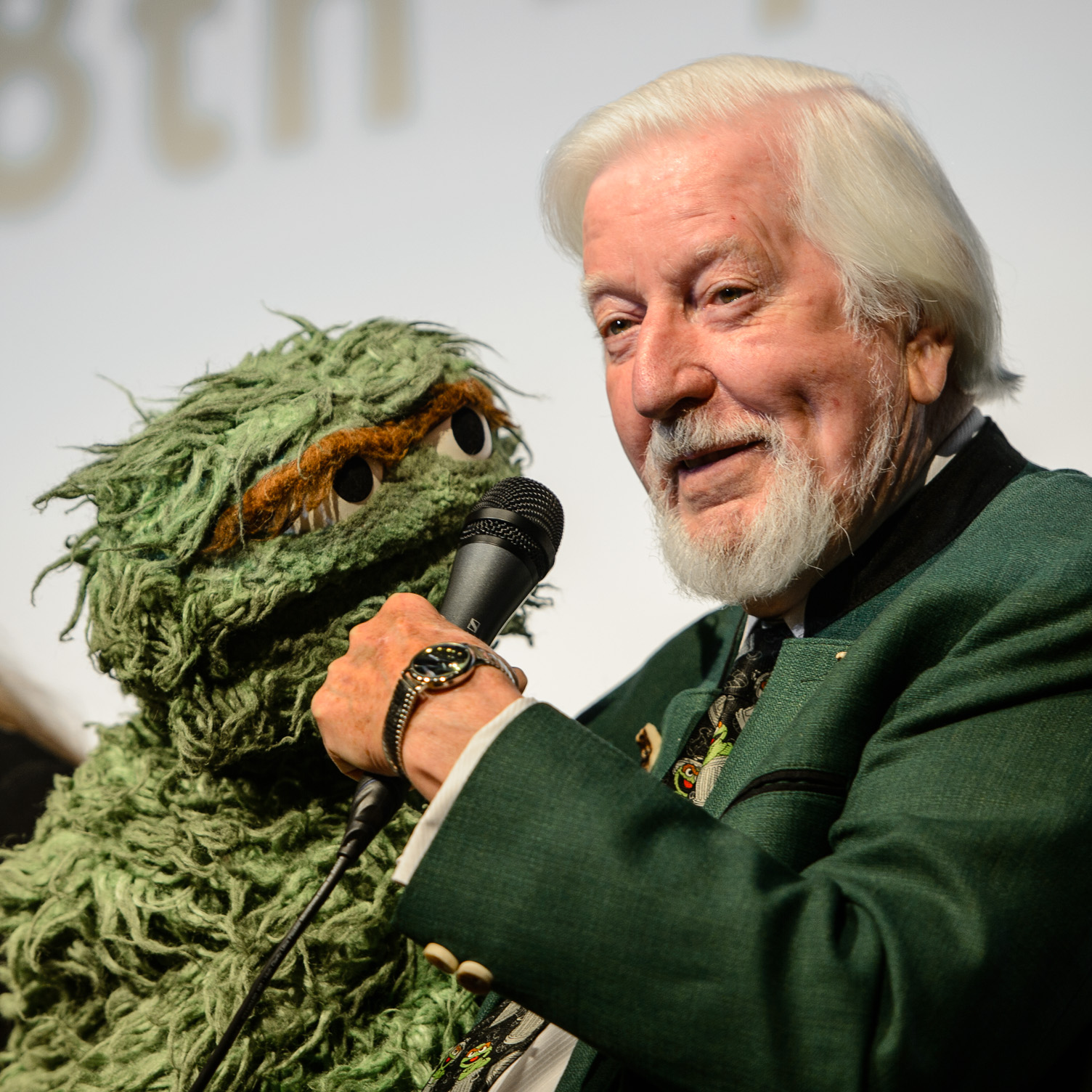
Spinney with Oscar the Grouch, May 2014

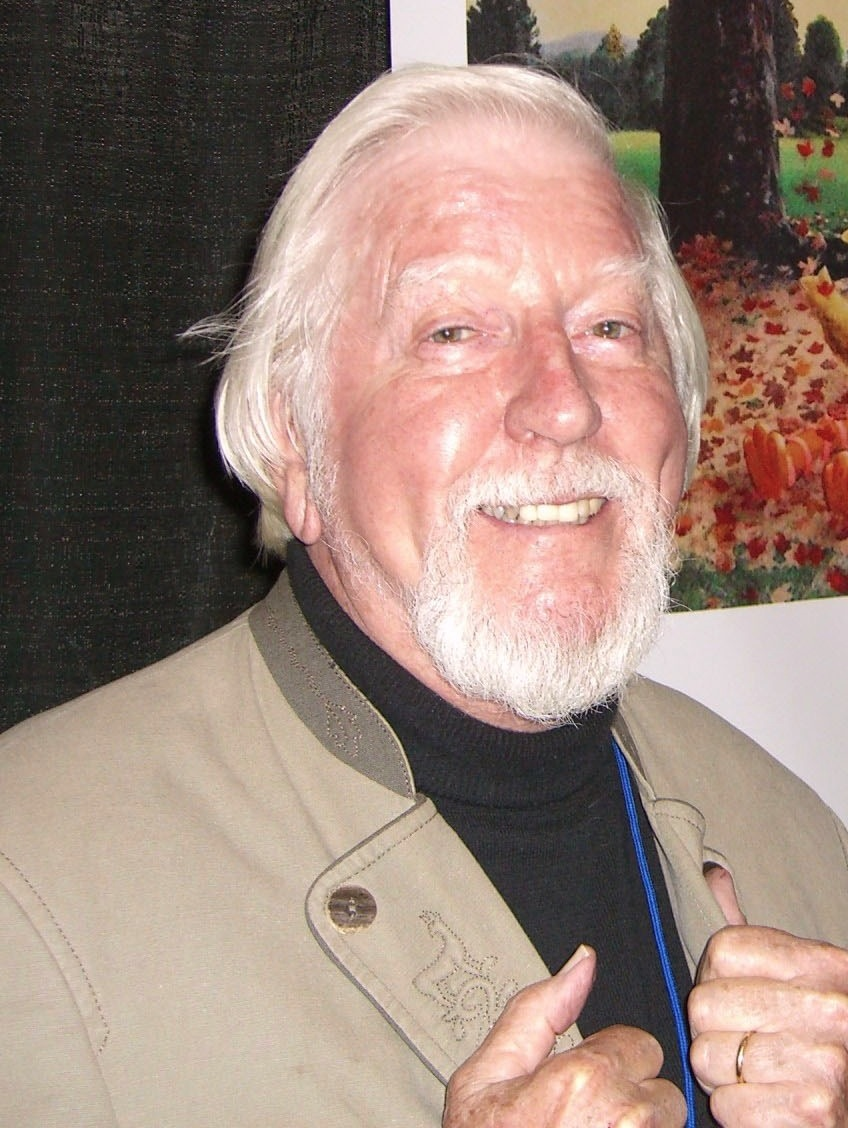
Spinney at the New York Comic Con in Manhattan in October 2010

Spinney first met Jim Henson in 1962 at a puppeteering festival, where Henson asked if he would like to "talk about the Muppets". As Spinney failed to realize the question was an employment offer, the conversation never came to pass.

In 1969, Spinney performed at a Puppeteers of America festival in Utah. His show was a mixture of live actors and puppets but was ruined by an errant spotlight that washed out the animated backgrounds. Henson was once again in attendance and noticed Spinney's performance. "I liked what you were trying to do," Henson said, and he asked once more if they could "talk about the Muppets". This time, they did have the conversation, and Spinney joined the Muppeteers full-time by late 1969.

Spinney joined Sesame Street for the inaugural season in 1969. However, he nearly left after the first season because he was not getting acceptable pay, but Kermit Love persuaded him to stay. He performed Big Bird and Oscar in Australia, China, Japan, and across Europe. As Big Bird and Oscar, Spinney conducted orchestras across the US and Canada, including the Boston Pops, and visited the White House multiple times. He provided the characters' voices on dozens of albums.

As Oscar, Spinney wrote How to Be a Grouch, a Whitman Tell-A-Tale picture book. With J. Milligan, he wrote the 2003 book The Wisdom of Big Bird (and the Dark Genius of Oscar the Grouch): Lessons from a Life in Feathers. Spinney narrated the audiobook Street Gang: The Complete History of Sesame Street by Michael Davis. His work has been studied by other international puppeteers who structure their performance styles after his, most evidently with full-body puppet costumes. For example, in the Chinese performance of Da Niao on Zhima Jie, the costume is an exact physical replica of Big Bird.

Though Big Bird and Oscar were his main characters, Spinney also performed as other characters. At one point, he created and performed Bruno the Trashman, a full-bodied puppet representing a garbage man, who also carried Oscar's trash can. Bruno was used until the foam plastic of the character broke down. Spinney also performed as Granny Bird, Big Bird's grandmother. The puppet used for Granny Bird was actually a spare Big Bird puppet, and Spinney provided her voice. As Granny Bird's appearances were often alongside Big Bird (who is, as she stated, her "favorite grandson"), her voice was usually pre-recorded so that Spinney could perform Big Bird. Spinney reprised his role as Oscar the Grouch in Night at the Museum: Battle of the Smithsonian in a cameo appearance next to Darth Vader.

On October 17, 2018, Spinney officially announced his retirement from Sesame Street after 49 years. His last performances as Big Bird and Oscar were recorded as part of the series' landmark 50th season, which aired in 2020, albeit Spinney's final recording session as his characters were ultimately not used in the broadcast version of the episode. The roles of Big Bird and Oscar were handed over to Matt Vogel and Eric Jacobson, respectively. The Hollywood Reporter reported that Spinney was earning over $300,000 per year at the time of his retirement.

=== Artwork ===
Some of Spinney's artwork includes the 1996 painting called Luna Bird, showing Big Bird walking on the Moon, and the 1997 painting Autumn, showing him playing in autumn leaves. Spinney also drew the drawing of Mr. Hooper that sits near Big Bird's nest.

== Personal life and death ==
Spinney had three children from his first marriage to Janice Spinney, whom he married in 1960. Spinney and Janice divorced in 1971. Spinney was married to his second wife, Debra Jean Gilroy, from 1979 until his death. In 2015, Spinney was diagnosed with dystonia, a neurological movement disorder that causes muscle contractions.

In 1984, NASA talks proposed flying Spinney with his Big Bird costume on the ill-fated STS-51L mission. However, due to the costume being not able to fit on Space Shuttle Challenger, the proposal dropped out. This could have most likely saved Spinney's life, as had he flew on the Shuttle, he could have died along with the shuttle crew. Another proposal was to fly Big Bird's teddy Radar into space, which was also dropped out.

Spinney died at his home in Woodstock, Connecticut, on December 8, 2019, at the age of 85.

== Filmography ==
=== Film ===
- The Muppet Movie (1979) – Big Bird (cameo)
- The Great Muppet Caper (1981) – Oscar the Grouch (cameo)
- The Muppets Take Manhattan (1984)- Big Bird, Oscar the Grouch (uncredited)
- Night of 100 Stars II (1985) – Big Bird
- Follow that Bird (1985) – Big Bird, Oscar the Grouch, Bruno the Trashman
- Wow, You're a Cartoonist! (1988) – Picklepuss and Pop
- Homeward Bound: The Incredible Journey (1993) – Dog in Pound (uncredited)
- The Adventures of Elmo in Grouchland (1999) – Big Bird, Oscar the Grouch
- Night at the Museum: Battle of the Smithsonian (2009) – Oscar the Grouch (cameo)

=== Television ===
- The Judy and Goggle Show (1958–59) – Goggle
- Bozo's Big Top (AKA: Bozo's Circus) As Ed Spinney (1959–69) – Mr. Lion, Kookie the Boxing Kangaroo, Flip-Flop the Rag Doll, various other characters
- Sesame Street (1969–2018) – Big Bird, Oscar the Grouch, Granny Bird (voice only), Bruno the Trashman, Shivers the Penguin, Granny Fanny Nesselrode, Beautiful Day Monster (occasionally), Betty Lou (occasionally), various characters
- The Flip Wilson Show (1970) – Big Bird, Oscar the Grouch
- What's My Line? (1973) — Big Bird, himself
- Out to Lunch (1974) – Big Bird, Oscar the Grouch
- The Electric Company (1972, 1975) – Big Bird, Oscar the Grouch
- Hollywood Squares (1976, 1977) — Big Bird, Oscar the Grouch
- Christmas Eve on Sesame Street (1978) -- Big Bird, Oscar the Grouch
- The Muppet Show (1979) – Big Bird
- Mister Rogers' Neighborhood (1981) – Big Bird
- Big Bird in China (1983) – Big Bird, Oscar the Grouch
- Don't Eat the Pictures (1983) – Big Bird, Oscar the Grouch
- The Muppets: A Celebration of 30 Years (1986) – Big Bird, Oscar the Grouch
- A Muppet Family Christmas (1987) – Big Bird, Oscar the Grouch
- Shalom Sesame (1987–1991) – Big Bird, Oscar the Grouch
- Big Bird in Japan (1989) – Big Bird
- Hanna-Barbera's 50th: A Yabba Dabba Doo Celebration – Big Bird
- Big Bird's Birthday Celebration (1991) – Big Bird, Oscar the Grouch, Bruno the Trashman
- Learn Along with Sesame (1996–2001) – Big Bird, Oscar the Grouch
- Elmo's World (1998–2009) – Big Bird, Oscar the Grouch
- Between the Lions (2001) – Big Bird
- Little Children, Big Challenges: Divorce (2012) – Big Bird
- Supernatural (2015) – Big Bird (uncredited)
- The Street (2015–2018) – Roy (final voice role)
- Sesame Street's 50th Anniversary Celebration (2019) – Himself (final TV appearance)

=== Video games ===
- Sesame Street: Oscar's Letter Party (1988) – Big Bird, Oscar the Grouch
- Let's Learn to Play Together (1988) – Big Bird, Oscar the Grouch
- Sesame Street: Big Bird's Hide & Speak (1990) – Big Bird
- Sesame Street: Letters (1991) – Big Bird, Oscar the Grouch
- Sesame Street: Numbers (1991) – Big Bird, Oscar the Grouch
- Sesame Street: Let's Make a Word! (1995) – Big Bird, Oscar the Grouch
- Sesame Street: Get Set to Learn! (1996) – Big Bird, Oscar the Grouch
- Sesame Street: The Three Grouchketeers (1998) – Oscar the Grouch
- Sesame Street: Elmo Through the Looking Glass (1998) – Oscar the Grouch
- Sesame Street: Grover's Travels (1998) – Big Bird
- Sesame Street: Baby and Me (1999) – Big Bird
- Sesame Street: Elmo's Letter Adventure (1999) – Big Bird
- Sesame Street: Elmo's Number Journey (1999) – Big Bird
- Sesame Street: Ernie's Adventures in Space (2000) – Oscar the Grouch
- Sesame Street: Elmo's Deep Sea Adventure (2000) – Oscar the Grouch
- Sesame Street Sports (2001) – Big Bird
- Sesame Street: Once Upon a Monster (2011) – Oscar the Grouch

== Awards and honors ==
Spinney was honored with four Emmy Awards for his portrayals on the series and two Grammy Awards for his related recordings. Two recordings of Spinney's voice earned Gold Record status. For his body of work, Spinney received both a star on the Hollywood Walk of Fame in 1994 and the Library of Congress' Living Legend award in 2000.

At the 33rd Daytime Emmy Awards in 2006, Spinney received the National Academy of Television Arts and Sciences' Lifetime Achievement Award. "I am elated and amazed to receive this honor from those who are committed to the best of what television and media have to offer, for doing what I've always wanted to do."

Spinney is the subject of a full-length documentary by Copper Pot Pictures called I Am Big Bird: The Caroll Spinney Story that premiered at the April 2014 Hot Docs Canadian International Documentary Festival.

Spinney was named one of The New Jewish Home's Eight Over Eighty Gala 2016 honorees.

Preceded by None	Performer of Big Bird; 1969–2018	Succeeded by Matt Vogel
Preceded by None	Performer of Oscar the Grouch; 1969–2018	Succeeded by Eric Jacobson
Preceded by None	Performer of Bruno the Trashman; 1979–1993	Succeeded by None
