= Big Bird =

Sesame Street character

- Sesame Street character
- A statue of Big Bird exhibited in the Lyndon Baines Johnson Library and Museum (2017)
- First appearance: Gordon introduces Sally to Sesame Street (November 10, 1969)
- Created by: Jim Henson; Kermit Love (builder)
- Performed by: Caroll Spinney (1969–2018); Daniel Seagren (stand-in, 1969; 1970); Matt Vogel (1996–present)
- Birthday: March 20

In-universe information
- Nicknames: Grandsonny, by Granny Bird; Bird, by his best friend, Snuffy; Turkey, feather face, and others, by Oscar the Grouch
- Species: Muppet bird
- Gender: Male
- Family: Granny Bird (grandmother); Eight foreign cousins
- Nationality: American

Big Bird is a Muppet character designed by Jim Henson and built by Kermit Love for the children's television show Sesame Street. An eight-foot-two-inch-tall (249 cm) anthropomorphic bright yellow flightless bird hence his name, he can roller skate, ice skate, dance, swim, sing, write poetry, draw, and ride a unicycle. Despite this wide array of talents, he is prone to frequent misunderstandings, on one occasion even singing the alphabet as a single word (pronouncing it as /æbkədɛfɡiːdʒɛkəlmɪnɒpkwərˈstuːvwɪksɪz/ in the song "ABC-DEF-GHI"). He would refer to grocer Mr. Hooper as "Mr. Looper", among other mispronunciations. He lives in a large nest behind the 123 Sesame Street brownstone and right next to Oscar the Grouch's trash can. In Season 46, the nest sits within a small, furnished maple tree, and is no longer hidden by used construction doors. He has a teddy bear named Radar, and is friends with Mr. Snuffleupagus.

Caroll Spinney performed Big Bird from 1969 to 2018. Matt Vogel began as an understudy in 1996 before becoming the character's full-time performer in 2018.

In 2000, Big Bird was named a Living Legend by the United States Library of Congress.

== Performing Big Bird ==
Big Bird was performed by Caroll Spinney starting in 1969. In the later years of Spinney's career, the show gradually started training new performers to play Big Bird. The apprentices included both Rick Lyon in the opening theme song of the show's 33rd season, and later Matt Vogel in the show's "Journey to Ernie" segment. Vogel became Big Bird's primary performer after Spinney's retirement.

Spinney was sick during the taping of a few first-season episodes, so Daniel Seagren took over the role. He also performed Big Bird when he appeared on The Ed Sullivan Show in 1969 and on Hollywood Squares in the 1970s. According to The Story of Jim Henson by Stephanie St. Pierre, the costume was built for Jim Henson to perform, but when Henson tried it on, Kermit Love, who had built the costume, did not think that Henson was walking like a bird is supposed to walk, and so Henson decided not to perform Big Bird. Frank Oz was offered the part, but since he disliked performing full-body characters, he turned down the job.

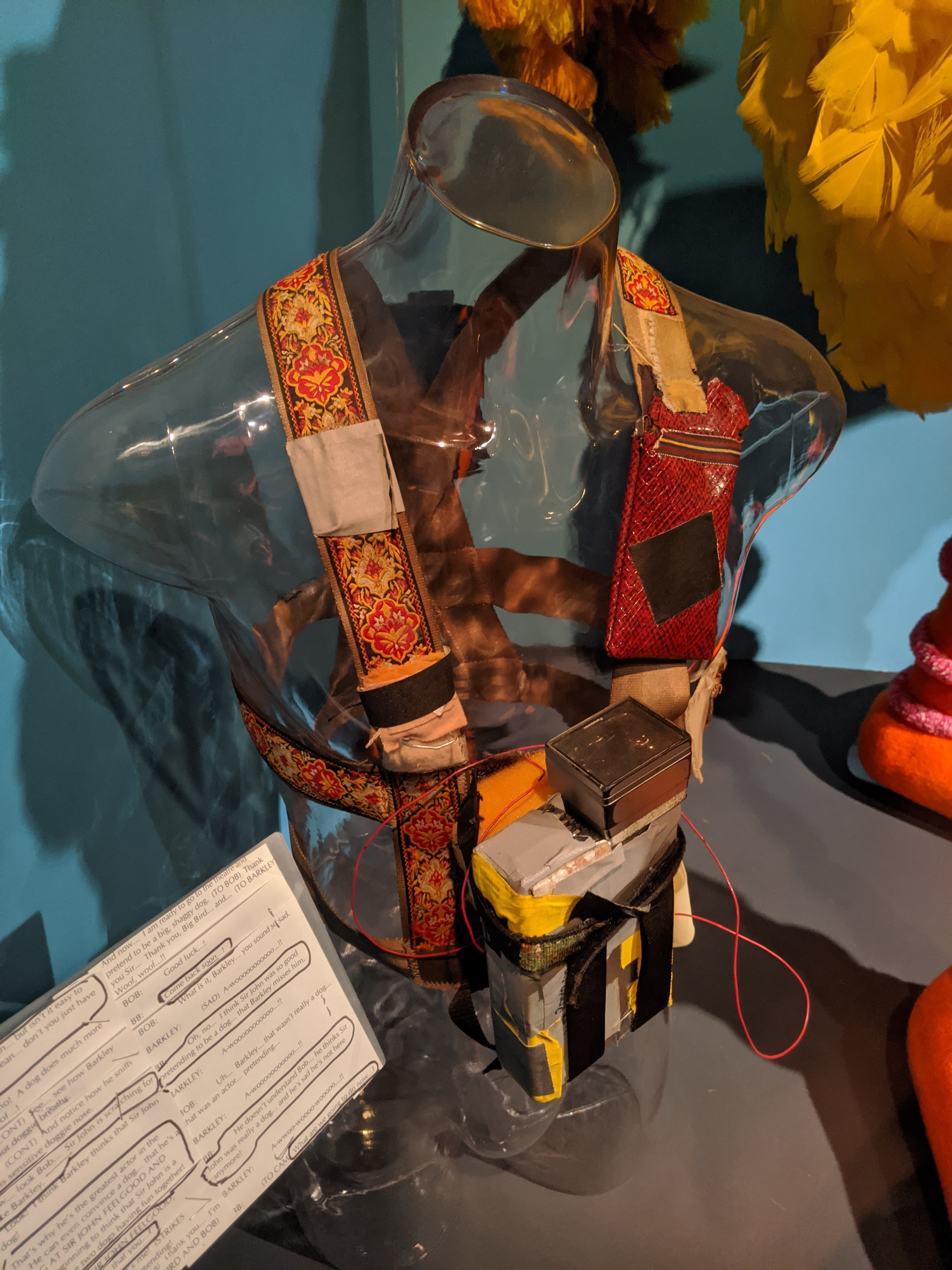
Harness with small monitor worn by Caroll Spinney when performing Big Bird in the 1970s

Director Jon Stone, in the 1994 documentary The World of Jim Henson, revealed that the Big Bird costume actually did not have any openings that would allow the actor to see; a small television was strapped to the actor's chest to allow him to navigate. The camera was set up for Spinney by technician Walt Rauffer, on the suggestion of director Bob Myhrum. Rauffer rigged the camera to a harness strapped to Spinney's chest; Spinney reported that they called the camera "the electronic bra". When Big Bird's performer is performing on location and cannot get a video feed, a small hole is made in the costume to allow him to see. In such cases, Big Bird wears a necktie to cover the hole. This can also be seen in the Sesame Street Live shows.

In scenes where Big Bird and Oscar the Grouch (both characters performed by Spinney) interact in a scene together, the situation has varied depending on the number of lines one or the other is given. When Spinney performed Big Bird, a second puppeteer operated Oscar to Spinney's vocals. Beginning in 1997, Vogel would operate Big Bird and Oscar was performed by Spinney as usual until 2015.

In 2015, due to being diagnosed with dystonia, Spinney no longer puppeteered the Big Bird suit full-time. Matt Vogel took over puppetry duties, manipulating the puppet to Spinney's vocals (either pre-recorded, dubbed in post-production, or provided live on set). Spinney continued to provide Big Bird's voice on the series for seasons 46 and 47, as well as select commercials, online videos, and the special Once Upon a Sesame Street Christmas. Afterwards, Spinney entered semi-retirement, and Matt Vogel fully assumed the role. Despite this, Spinney continued to receive onscreen credit for playing the characters through Season 50.

On October 17, 2018, Spinney announced his official retirement from both his characters. The following day, he recorded his final performances as Big Bird and Oscar the Grouch as part of Episode 5022 for the series' landmark 50th anniversary.

== Costume and portrayal ==
Big Bird was designed by a drawing from Jim Henson and built by Kermit Love in 1969. The design was based on a previous Henson creation, a seven-foot-tall (210 cm) dragon that the puppeteer created for a La Choy advertising campaign. The Big Bird performer is completely enclosed within the costume, and extends their right hand over their head to operate the head and neck of the puppet. The Muppeteer's left hand serves as Big Bird's left wing, while the right wing is stuffed and hangs loosely from a fishing line that runs through a loop under the neck and attaches to the wrist of the left hand. The right hand thus does the opposite of the left hand: as the left hand goes down, the right hand is pulled up by the fishing line. A secondary Muppeteer would be used in scenes where Big Bird uses both his wings or holds something in the right wing. The Muppeteer also moves Big Bird’s eyelids using a trigger controlled by their pinky finger.

Henson's original sketch for Big Bird. Left: the puppet's exterior appearance. Right: Cutaway image showing how the puppet is operated.

Big Bird's body suit weighs ten pounds, and his head weighs four pounds. According to writer Louise Gikow, the heat inside the suit is "unbearable, and it's extraordinarily difficult to hold Big Bird's head."

Different versions of Big Bird are portrayed in some international versions of Sesame Street. For example, the Dutch version has a blue bird named Pino. In the Latin American version (Plaza Sésamo), Big Bird's parrot cousin, Abelardo Montoya, is featured. He appears similar to Big Bird, but he is green.

Big Bird's appearance has changed over the years, as has his personality. He originally had very few feathers on the top of his head; his body feathers were also more shaggy and unkempt. As time went on he gradually gained more feathers on his head, giving it a more rounded appearance, and developed a blaze-like crest of lighter yellow feathers above his eyes. His body feathers got fluffier, rounder and more well groomed as well. His personality developed over time from a more dopey and "bird-brained" character into the gentle, childlike innocent he is known as today. Although all the Sesame Street Muppet characters are technically ageless, Big Bird is psychologically written to represent a six-year-old.

The costume is partially assembled by company American Plume & Fancy Feather, using the tail feathers from turkeys; as the feathers are rarely clean, company owner Anthony Trento calls the Big Bird costume his "toughest customer". Sesame Workshop is said to reject roughly 90 percent of all the feathers selected for use on the costume.

=== International versions (adaptations) ===
| Country / Region | Big Bird's cousin | Description | Performer |
|---|---|---|---|
| Brazil | Garibaldo | Original version was bright blue, with a long pointed beak and blue-striped legs; 2007 introduced a yellow version identical to the American Big Bird | Laerte Morrone (1972–1977); Fernando Gomes (2007–2014); Hugo Picchi (2009); Falcon Mantovani (2019) |
| China | 大鸟 (Da Niao) (Big Bird) | Identical to American version | Zhu Ming |
| France | Toccata | Grey-white with brown brows, resembling a seagull or albatross | Lucien Morisse; Claude Sonneville (singing voice) |
| Mexico | Abelardo Montoya | Bright green with a pink throat, red face and parrot-like beak | Alberto Estrella (1981–1992); Héctor Marquez (1992–1995); Eugenio Bartilotti (1995–2004); Héctor Loeza (2004–present) |
| Netherlands | Pino | Pale blue with yellow rings around eyes and multicolored feathered "sprigs" from top of head. | Dirk Grijspeirt (1976); Theo Joling (1977); Bert Plagman (1979); Erik J. Meijer (1980–1984); Leo Dijkgraaf (1984–1991); Renée Menschaar (1991–present) |
| Portugal | Poupas | Orange with white and brown on face | Luís Velez |
| Spain | Caponata | Primarily orange and yellow feathers on body; red-and-white striped legs, red shoes with bows. Wears a curly pink wig. | Emma Cohen |
| Turkey | Minik Kuş | Orange with pink feathers on face | Hakan Odabaşı |

== Select filmography ==
- Sesame Street (1969–present) (TV)
- Christmas Eve on Sesame Street (1978) (TV)
- A Special Sesame Street Christmas (1978) (TV)
- The Muppet Show ... episode #318 (1979) (TV, Crossover with The Muppets)
- The Muppet Movie (1979) (Crossover with The Muppets)
- Big Bird in China (1983) (TV)
- Don't Eat the Pictures (1983) (TV)
- The Muppets Take Manhattan (1984) (Cameo during the wedding finale)
- Sesame Street Presents: Follow That Bird (1985)
- Sesame Street: Play-Along Games and Songs (1986)
- The Muppets: A Celebration of 30 Years (1986) (TV, Crossover with The Muppets)
- A Muppet Family Christmas (1987) (TV, Crossover with The Muppets)
- Sesame Street: Magic on Sesame Street (1988)
- Count It Higher: Great Music Videos From Sesame Street (1988)
- Big Bird in Japan (1989) (TV)
- The Muppets Celebrate Jim Henson (1990) (TV, Crossover with The Muppets)
- Big Bird's Birthday or Let Me Eat Cake (1991) (TV)
- Sesame Street Stays Up Late (1993) (TV)
- Sesame Street: Big Bird Sings! (1995)
- Elmo Saves Christmas (1996) (TV)
- Sesame Street: Get Up and Dance (1997)
- Sesame Street: Kids' Favorite Songs (1999)
- The Adventures of Elmo in Grouchland (1999)
- Sesame Street: Let's Make Music (2000)
- Elmo's Musical Adventure: The Story of Peter and the Wolf (2001)
- Sesame Beginnings (2006–2007)
- The Furchester Hotel ... episodes #201 and #216 (2016) (TV)
- The Magical Wand Chase (2017) (TV)
- Sesame Street: Elmo's Playdate (2020) (TV)
- The ABCs of COVID-19: A CNN/Sesame Street Town Hall for Kids and Parents (2020) (TV)
- Furry Friends Forever: Elmo Gets a Puppy (2021) (TV)
- See Us Coming Together - A Sesame Street Special (2021) (TV)

=== Guest appearances ===
- The Electric Company ... episode #131 (1972)
- Macy's Thanksgiving Day Parade (1974–present)
- Hollywood Squares (1976–1977, 2000, 2001)
- Mister Rogers' Neighborhood ... episode #1483 (1981)
- Kids Like These (1987)
- Hey Hey, It's Saturday (1995)
- Soul Man (1998)
- The West Wing (2004)
- Jeopardy! (2006)
- Deal or No Deal (2006)
- A Capitol Fourth (2009)
- Jimmy Kimmel Live (2009)
- Extreme Makeover: Home Edition (2011)
- Saturday Night Live (2012, 2015)
- The Colbert Report (2013, 2014)
- Super Bowl 50 (2016)
- The Kelly Clarkson Show (2019)
- The Late Late Show with James Corden (2019)
- The Drew Barrymore Show (2020)

=== Commercials ===
- Kmart (1997, 1999, 2003)
- Ford (1998)
- Ad Council (1990s, 2024)
- NBA (2003)
- IBM (2016, 2018)
- Doordash (2021)

== Species ==
The book “G” is for Growing: Thirty Years of Research on Children and Sesame Street cites a producer of Sesame Street who refers to Big Bird as a canary. In the series 11 episode, "Mister Rogers Talks about Competition" of the show, Mister Rogers' Neighborhood, Big Bird was asked by King Friday XIII if he was related to the cassowary; he replied, "I'm actually a Golden Condor." On the January 23, 1976 episode of Hollywood Squares, Big Bird was asked what kind of bird he is and said he was a lark, causing host Peter Marshall to crack up. In the film Don't Eat the Pictures, Osiris calls Big Bird an ibis. Zoologist Mike Dickison suggested in his popular Pechakucha talk that Big Bird represents a unique species that evolved from the whooping crane. For decades, Oscar the Grouch has been calling Big Bird a turkey, more as an insult rather than a reference to his species. Big Bird is always described as being flightless.

== US politics ==
During the first presidential debate on October 3, 2012, Mitt Romney used Big Bird as an example of spending cuts he would make to reduce the federal budget deficit. Romney told the moderator, Jim Lehrer, "I like PBS, I love Big Bird. Actually like you, too. But I'm not going to – I'm not going to keep on spending money on things to borrow money from China to pay for. That's number one."

Barack Obama’s campaign later released a satirical advertisement in which Romney described Big Bird as an "evil genius" and "a menace to our economy", and depicted Romney as more concerned with cracking down on Big Bird than on white collar criminals such as Bernie Madoff and Ken Lay.

Sesame Workshop subsequently asked that both campaigns remove Sesame Street characters from campaign materials, stating on their website: "Sesame Workshop is a nonpartisan, nonprofit organization and we do not endorse candidates or participate in political campaigns."

In response to the mention in the debates, Big Bird made an appearance in a 2012 Weekend Update segment on Saturday Night Live with then-host Seth Meyers. During the interview, Big Bird joked about how he suddenly "felt famous" after being mentioned in the debates, but refused to make any political statements so as not to "ruffle any feathers."

=== COVID-19 vaccine and parody Twitter account ===
Big Bird
(@BigBird)
tweeted:

I got the COVID-19 vaccine today! My wing is feeling a little sore, but it'll give my body an extra protective boost that keeps me and others healthy.

Ms. @EricaRHill

even said I’ve been getting vaccines since I was a little bird. I had no idea!

6 Nov 2021

On November 6, 2021, Big Bird's official Twitter account posted that Big Bird had received a COVID-19 vaccine, in an effort to promote vaccination of children, and President Joe Biden responded in support. Senator Ted Cruz criticized Sesame Street, calling the post "Government propaganda... for your 5 year old!". An unapproved parody account called "Big Bird for Senate" was created, and portrayed Big Bird as a candidate for Cruz's senate seat. The account has since been deleted.

== Other appearances ==
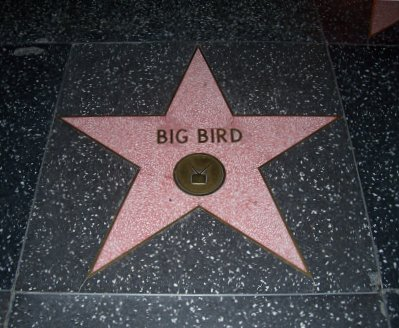
Big Bird is one of two Muppets to have a star on the Hollywood Walk of Fame.

A walk-around character of Big Bird, at a theme park

=== Follow That Bird (1985) ===
In 1985, Big Bird was the star of his own film, Sesame Street Presents Follow That Bird, alongside the cast of Sesame Street. The plot focused on him being moved away to live with a family of dodos by a meddling social-worker named Miss Finch (voiced by Sally Kellerman). He is not happy with his new home and he runs away and embarks on a cross-country adventure. Along the way, he finds help from a friendly truck driver (Waylon Jennings) and two farmer kids (Alyson Court and Benjamin Barrett). But on the bad side, there are two unscrupulous carnival-owning brothers (Dave Thomas and Joe Flaherty) who want to kidnap and make him perform in their carnival for their own profit. In the meantime, his friends Ernie and Bert, Cookie Monster, Grover, Count von Count, Telly and Oscar the Grouch are in pursuit of him to find him and bring him back home safely. Also joining them are their human friends, Gordon, Maria, Olivia and Linda with Bob aiding them from Sesame Street.

=== 1970s and 1980s ===
In the mid-late 1970s, Big Bird made several appearances on The Hollywood Squares. As with Mr. Hooper, Big Bird frequently mispronounced host Peter Marshall's name, calling him "Mr. Marshmallow" or "Mr. Masher". When Marshall asked Big Bird what kind of bird he was, he replied "I'm a lark", causing Marshall to laugh and break character.

He appeared in a series 11 episode of Mister Rogers' Neighborhood in the Neighborhood of Make-Believe segment, in which he enters the "Draw the Neighborhood" contest.

He made an appearance as a guest star on the third season of The Muppet Show. A portrait of Big Bird also appeared in the pilot The Muppet Show: Sex and Violence. Big Bird also made brief appearances in The Muppet Movie and The Muppets Take Manhattan. He appeared in A Muppet Family Christmas holiday special, in which he dissuades the Swedish Chef from cooking him for Christmas dinner by offering him a gift of homemade chocolate covered birdseed. They then sing a duet of "The Christmas Song".

NASA was in talks to take Big Bird in the 1986 Challenger space shuttle but instead took a teacher, Christa McAuliffe, who died along with the rest of the crew in its televised breakup 73 seconds after launch.

=== Henson memorial service (1990) ===
On May 21, 1990, Big Bird appeared at Jim Henson's memorial service at the Cathedral of St. John the Divine in New York City, singing Kermit the Frog's signature song, "Bein' Green". Performer Caroll Spinney nearly broke down several times during the deeply touching performance, which was later described by Life as "an epic and almost unbearably moving event".

=== 21st century ===
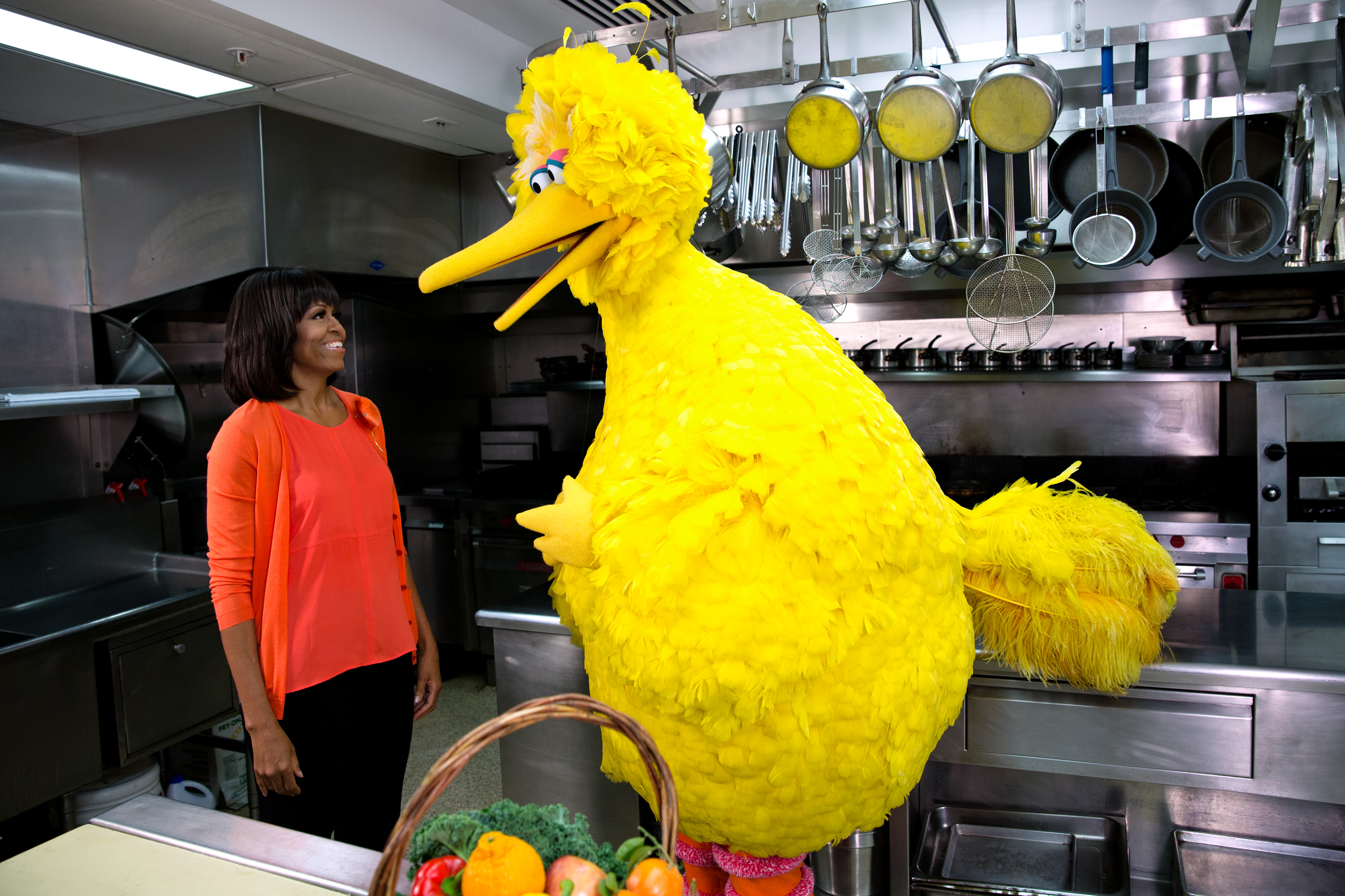
Michelle Obama participates in a Let's Move! and Sesame Street public service announcement taping with Big Bird in the White House Kitchen, 2013

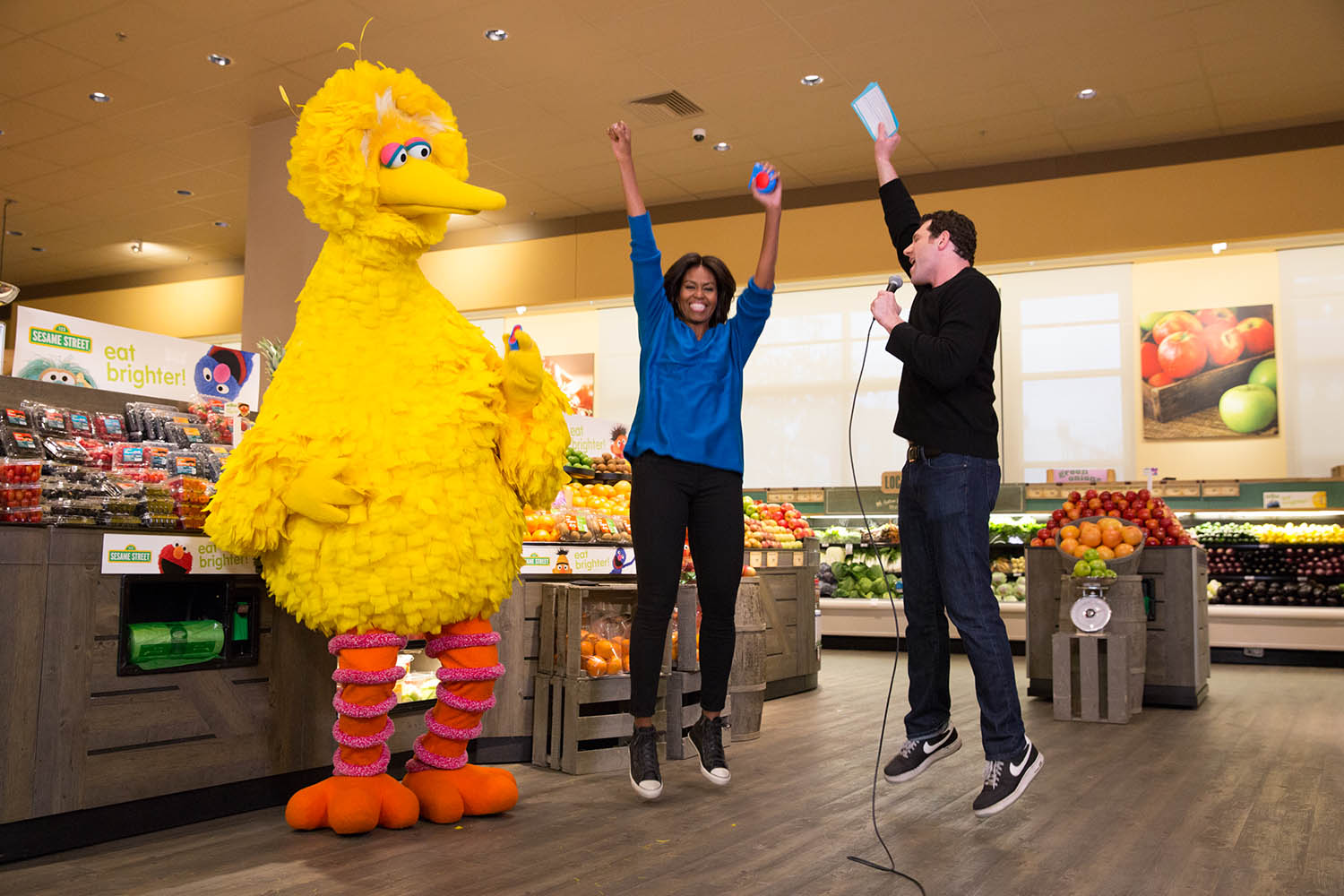
Big Bird with Michelle Obama on Billy on the Street, with host Billy Eichner

Big Bird made a non-speaking appearance in The West Wing Season 5 episode "Eppur Si Muove". During a visit by The Muppets to the White House, Big Bird sat down on a bench next to C. J. Cregg, who had complained during the episode of past comparisons to Big Bird due to her height.

He appeared briefly at Qualcomm's CES Keynote on January 7, 2013, to show off Sesame Workshop's newest app, 'Big Bird's Words', due in Summer 2013.

He appeared in the final episode of The Colbert Report in 2014 along with Cookie Monster and dozens of other celebrities singing "We'll Meet Again".

On February 16, 2015, Big Bird appeared alongside Michelle Obama on Billy on the Street, a comedy game show hosted by Billy Eichner. Before the quiz, Michelle Obama talked about "eat brighter", a campaign to promote healthy food in kids which she and a number of Sesame Street characters, including Big Bird, participated in. The short was nominated for an Emmy Award later that year.

Big Bird appeared with Caroll Spinney in a spoof of the Academy Award-winning film Birdman. Published on YouTube on February 19, 2015, the video shows Spinney sitting in a dressing room with a poster of Big Bird behind him. Spinney hears the voice of his alter ego, just as Michael Keaton's character Riggan hears his alter ego Birdman in the movie. He uses telekinesis to throw a box of tissues at the Big Bird poster. The spoof uses similar music to the Birdman film. The Big Birdman spoof appears as if it were shot in one long take, mimicking the long scenes of the movie. It follows Spinney out of the dressing room, down hallways, through doors, and out onto the sidewalk, where he is joined by Big Bird.

In an advertisement for AT&T/DirecTV, Big Bird and other film/television personalities such as David Hasselhoff (as his Knight Rider persona Michael Knight) and the Oklahoma Sooners football team appear interspersed with the daily workings of a major city as someone walks around using the service's TV Everywhere initiative.

At the 2019 Kennedy Center Honors, which was filmed on the day Spinney died, Vogel made an appearance as Big Bird for the event to celebrate Sesame Street being honored by the Kennedy Center.
