= Kennedy Center Honors =

Annual American honor in the performing arts

- Logotype symbolizing "a spectrum of many skills within the performing arts"
- Awarded for: Lifetime contributions to American culture through the performing arts
- Country: United States
- Presented by: Board of Trustees of the Kennedy Center
- First award: 1978
- Website: www.kennedy-center.org/programs/specialevents/honors

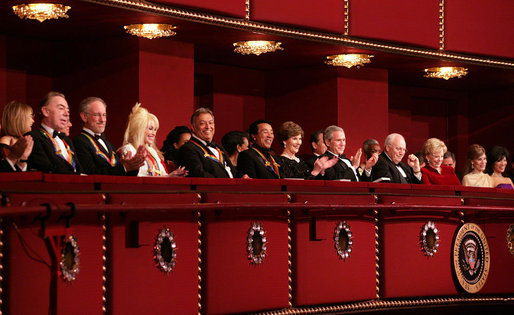
Honorees at the Kennedy Center on December 6, 2006, from left: Andrew Lloyd Webber, Steven Spielberg, Dolly Parton, Zubin Mehta, and Smokey Robinson, with First Lady Laura Bush, President George W. Bush, Vice President Dick Cheney, and Lynne Cheney.

The Kennedy Center Honors is an annual tribute recognizing performing arts contributions to American culture. Presented annually since 1978, a December gala celebrates five honorees at the Kennedy Center Opera House in Washington, D.C. Chiefly awarded to individuals for lifetime achievements, honorees have occasionally included duos or musical groups, while collective honors have recognized one musical, one television show, and one performing arts venue.

== History ==
George Stevens Jr. created the Kennedy Center Honors with Nick Vanoff and produced the first gala in 1978. He was the producer and co-writer through the 2014 awards, after which he sold the production rights to the Kennedy Center.

The idea for the Kennedy Center Honors began in 1977, after that year's 10th-anniversary White House reception and Kennedy Center program for the American Film Institute (AFI). Roger L. Stevens, the founding chairman of the Kennedy Center, asked George Stevens Jr. (no relation), the founding director of the AFI, to hold an event for the center. Stevens Jr. asked Isaac Stern to become involved, and then pitched the idea to the television network CBS, who bought it. With the first Honors event and honorees, CBS vice president for specials, Bernie Sofronski, stated:

George [Stevens] came to us with this. What turned us on is that this is the only show of its kind. In Europe and most countries, they have ways of honoring their actors and their athletes. England has its command performances for the queen. We see this as a national honoring of people who have contributed to society, not someone who happens to have a pop record hit at the moment ... Our intention is not to do just another award show. We're going to make an effort in terms of a real special.

The first host was Leonard Bernstein in 1978, followed by Eric Sevareid in 1979 (with Gene Kelly closing it) and Beverly Sills in 1980. Walter Cronkite hosted from 1981 to 2002 and Caroline Kennedy hosted from 2003 to 2012. Glenn Close hosted in 2013 and Stephen Colbert hosted from 2014 to 2016. Ricky Kirshner and Glenn Weiss of White Cherry Entertainment were the Executive Producers of the 38th annual Kennedy Center Honors (2015) after George Stevens Jr. stepped down. There was no formal host in 2017, although Caroline Kennedy delivered an introduction. In 2018, mid-2021, and 2023 Gloria Estefan hosted, LL Cool J hosted in 2019, and David Letterman hosted in late 2021. Queen Latifah hosted in 2024. There was no formal host in 2022, though several former honorees delivered an introduction. In 2022, David Jammy of Done+Dusted and Elizabeth Kelly of ROK Productions were hired to serve as Executive Producers.

This awards show does not air live (with the exception of closed-circuit venues), but an edited version lasting approximately two hours is normally televised on CBS after Christmas. In 2024, the presentation added a half hour, making the show two and a half hours. Normally, the show has been aired between Christmas and New Year's on CBS television, but, in a departure from this tradition, the 2019 Kennedy Center Honors aired on regular television in early December and was later made available on CBS All Access. Due to the COVID-19 pandemic, the 2020 edition was postponed and eventually held between May 17 and May 22, 2021, and the edited broadcast aired on June 6, 2021. Since 2021, the annual Honors broadcast has been available to stream for a limited time through CBS platforms and Paramount+

The 2025 Kennedy Center Honors ceremony, held at the Kennedy Center on December 7, 2025, was hosted by U.S. president Donald Trump, thus marking the first time any sitting or former U.S. president hosted the Kennedy Center Honors.

=== Selection process ===
Honoree recommendations are accepted from the general public, and the Kennedy Center initiated a Special Honors Advisory Committee, which comprises members of the board of trustees as well as past honorees and distinguished artists. The executive committee of the board of trustees selects the honoree recipients based on their impact and contributions to American culture and excellence in music, dance, theater, opera, motion pictures or television. The selections are typically announced sometime between July and September. Most honorees are Americans, with non-U.S. citizen honorees typically hailing from elsewhere in the anglosphere.

== Events ==
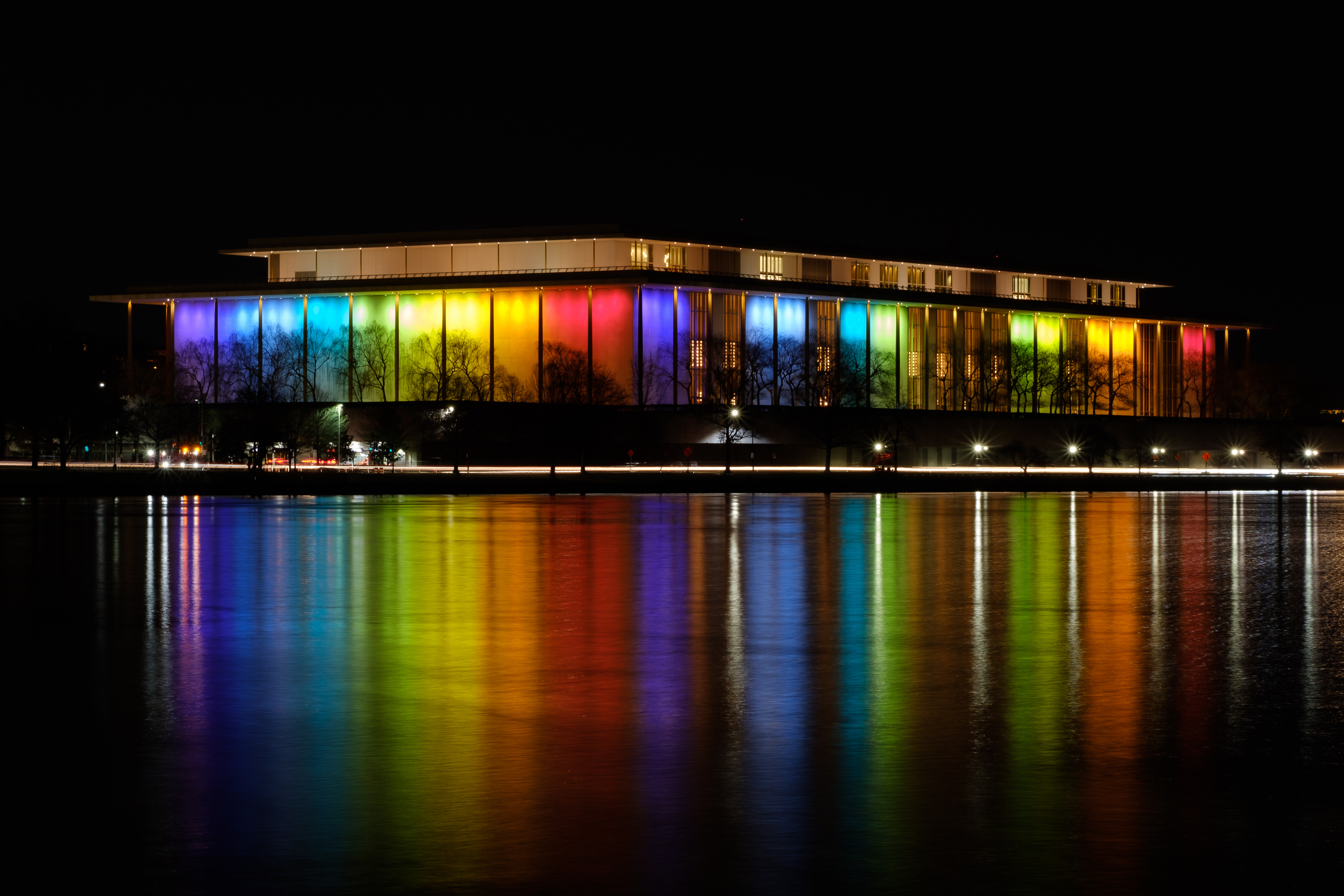
The Kennedy Center lights up in rainbow colors every year in the weeks preceding the ceremony.

The invitation-only, weekend-long ceremony includes the Chairman's Luncheon, the State Department dinner, White House reception, and the Honors gala performances and supper.

The Chairman's Luncheon is held on Saturday at the Kennedy Center. Surrounded by the honorees, the chairman of the board of trustees launches the event with a welcoming speech. At that evening's reception and dinner at the State Department, presided over by the Secretary of State, the honorees are introduced and the Honors medallions are presented by the chairman of the board. The wide rainbow-colored ribbon then hung around the necks of the recipients and prominently noticeable when the events are televised, symbolizes "a spectrum of many skills within the performing arts" according to creator Ivan Chermayeff.

On Sunday, there is an early-evening White House reception, traditionally hosted by the President of the United States and the First Lady, followed by the Honors gala performance at the Kennedy Center and supper.

Prior to 2017, there had been three occasions in which the president did not attend the gala performance. President Jimmy Carter did not attend in 1979 during the Iran hostage crisis; First Lady Rosalynn Carter served as his surrogate. President George H. W. Bush was on a trip to Brussels and could not attend in 1989; First Lady Barbara Bush served as his surrogate. President Bill Clinton was on a trip to Budapest and could not attend in 1994; First Lady Hillary Rodham Clinton served as his surrogate.

For the 2015 gala performance, President Barack Obama joined First Lady Michelle Obama late after addressing the nation in a live telecast from the White House.

In 2017, President Donald Trump and First Lady Melania Trump decided not to participate in events honoring recipients of the 2017 Kennedy Center Honors awards to "allow the Honorees to celebrate without any political distraction." The 2017 ceremony was held on December 3, 2017, without them, marking the first time that neither the president nor the first lady attended; Caroline Kennedy was the host and presented the honorees. The traditional dinner at the State Department on the Saturday evening before the ceremony was hosted by Secretary of State Rex Tillerson, and the White House reception was canceled. Donald and Melania Trump also did not participate in any of the events of the 2018 or 2019 editions.

Because of changes imposed on the delayed and abbreviated 2020 edition due to the COVID-19 pandemic, President Joe Biden and First Lady Jill Biden welcomed that year's honorees to the White House in May 2021 but did not attend any other events.

For the 2021 edition, Joe and Jill Biden attended the gala performance on December 5, 2021, marking the first time since 2016 that a sitting president and first lady had attended the event.

In 2025, the medallion given to each recipient received a redesign by Tiffany & Co. for the first time since 1978. The former design from James "Jimmy" Baturin had rainbow ribbons and a gold name plate. The new design has a navy blue strap holding the gold disc, which includes the building and the rainbow colors.

Also in 2025, after the board of the center made the decision to change the name, CBS added a voiceover to relabel the annual honors as "Trump-Kennedy Center Honors". Trump hosted the ceremony himself, the first time a president has done so, and the Nielsen ratings for broadcast dropped to a new all-time low.

== Recipients ==
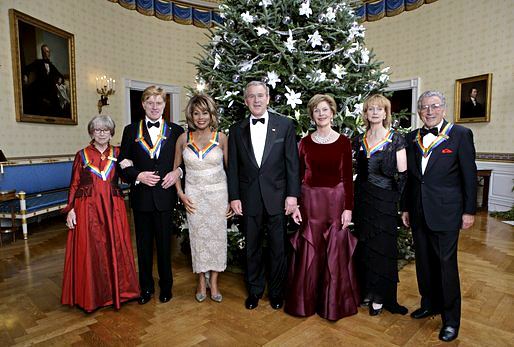
2005 Kennedy Center honorees: Julie Harris, Robert Redford, Tina Turner, Suzanne Farrell and Tony Bennett with President George W. Bush and First Lady Laura Bush, in the Blue Room at the White House, December 4, 2005.

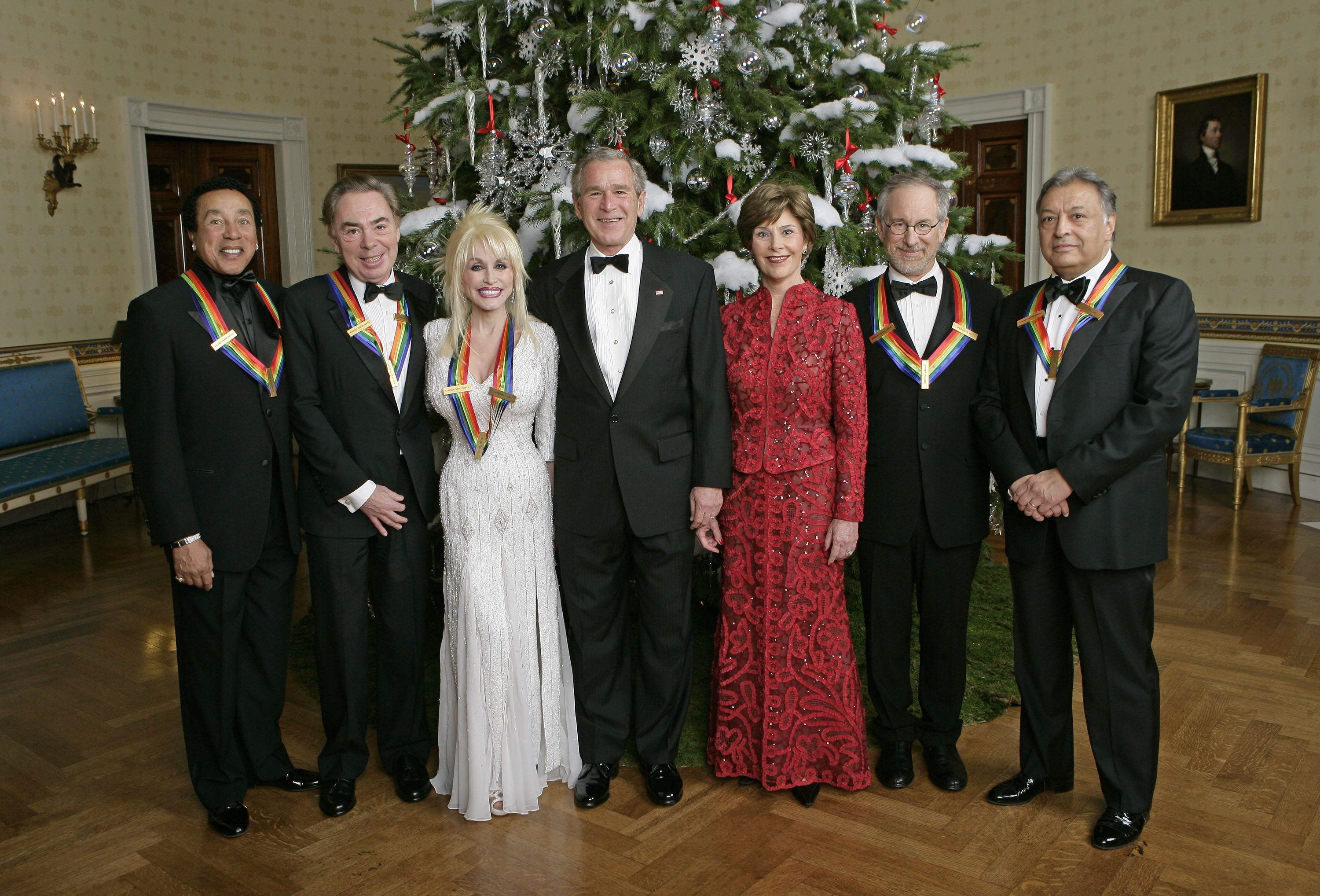
2006 Kennedy Center honorees: Smokey Robinson, Andrew Lloyd Webber, Dolly Parton, Steven Spielberg, and Zubin Mehta with President George W. Bush and the First Lady Laura Bush.

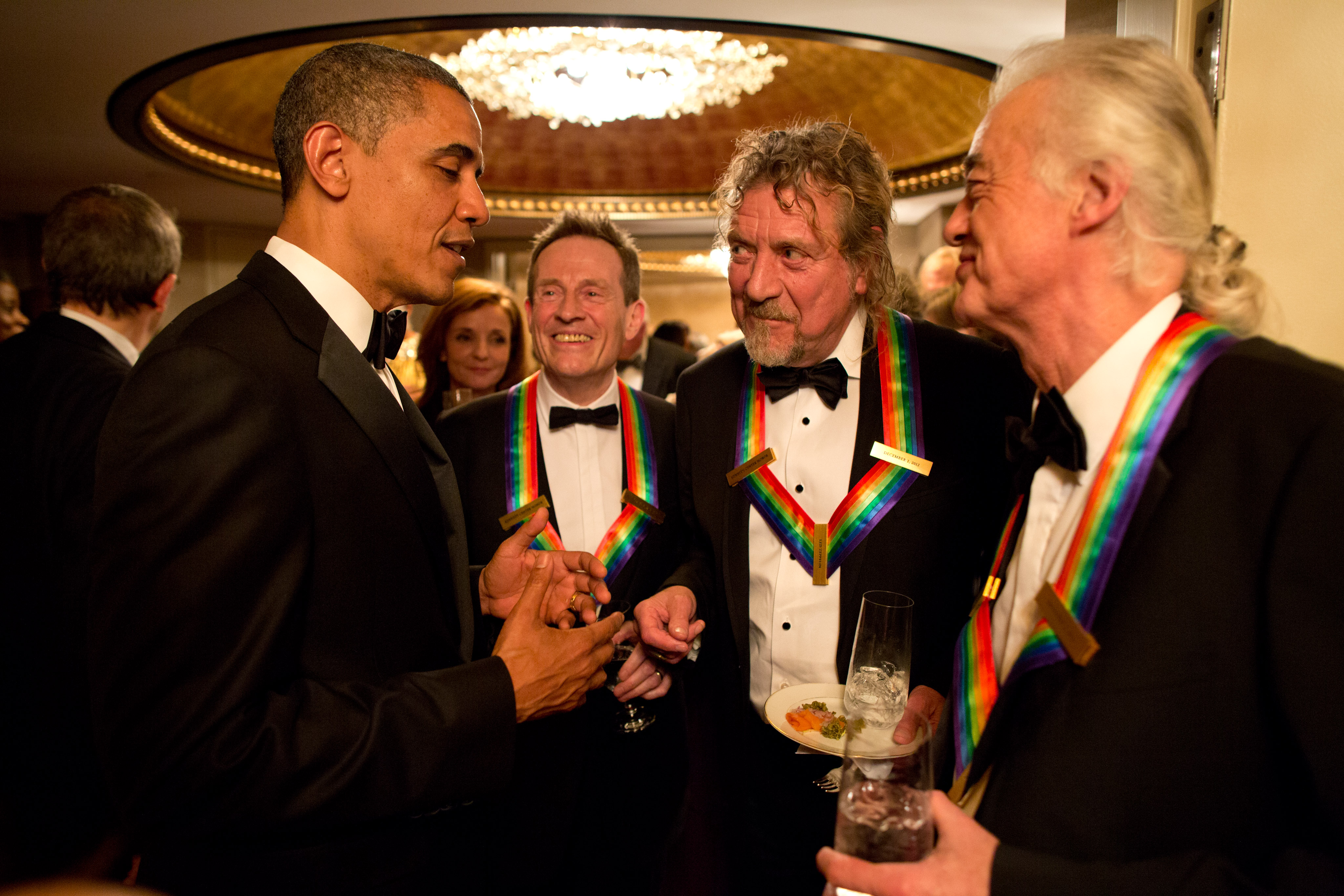
The surviving members of Led Zeppelin were honored in 2012 and are pictured here with President Barack Obama.

As of 2026, 268 people have been awarded the Kennedy Center Honors, as well as two special awards. The award given to stand-up comedian and actor Bill Cosby in 1998 was rescinded in 2018 following Cosby's sexual assault conviction.

The vast majority of Kennedy Center Honors have been bestowed on individuals. On 13 occasions since 1985, awards have been presented to duos or groups, including three married couples who were actors: Hume Cronyn and Jessica Tandy; Paul Newman and Joanne Woodward; and Ossie Davis and Ruby Dee. Dancers The Nicholas Brothers, Fayard and Harold were honored, along with three musical theater songwriting duos: Alan Jay Lerner and Frederick Loewe, Betty Comden and Adolph Green, and John Kander and Fred Ebb.

Members of seven music groups were awarded: Pete Townshend and Roger Daltrey of The Who; John Paul Jones, Jimmy Page and Robert Plant of Led Zeppelin; Don Henley, Timothy B. Schmit, Joe Walsh and (posthumously) Glenn Frey of the Eagles; Philip Bailey, Verdine White and Ralph Johnson of Earth, Wind & Fire; Bono, The Edge, Adam Clayton, and Larry Mullen Jr. of U2, Mickey Hart, Billy Kreutzmann, (posthumously) Phil Lesh and Bob Weir of the Grateful Dead, and Paul Stanley, Gene Simmons, Ace Frehley (posthumously) and Peter Criss of Kiss.

At the 2018 ceremony, a special award for "trailblazing creators of a transformative work that defies category" was presented to the creators of the musical Hamilton: Lin-Manuel Miranda, Thomas Kail, Andy Blankenbuehler and Alex Lacamoire.

For the first time, the 2019 honorees included a television program. The co-founders of Sesame Street, Joan Ganz Cooney and Lloyd Morrisett, accepted the Kennedy Center Honors on behalf of all the creators.

In 2024, a special award was given to the Apollo Theater in New York City, the first institution to be awarded at the Kennedy Center Honors.

=== 1970s ===
Year	Honorees
1978	Marian Anderson, Fred Astaire, George Balanchine, Richard Rodgers, and Arthur Rubinstein
1979	Aaron Copland, Ella Fitzgerald, Henry Fonda, Martha Graham, and Tennessee Williams

=== 1980s ===
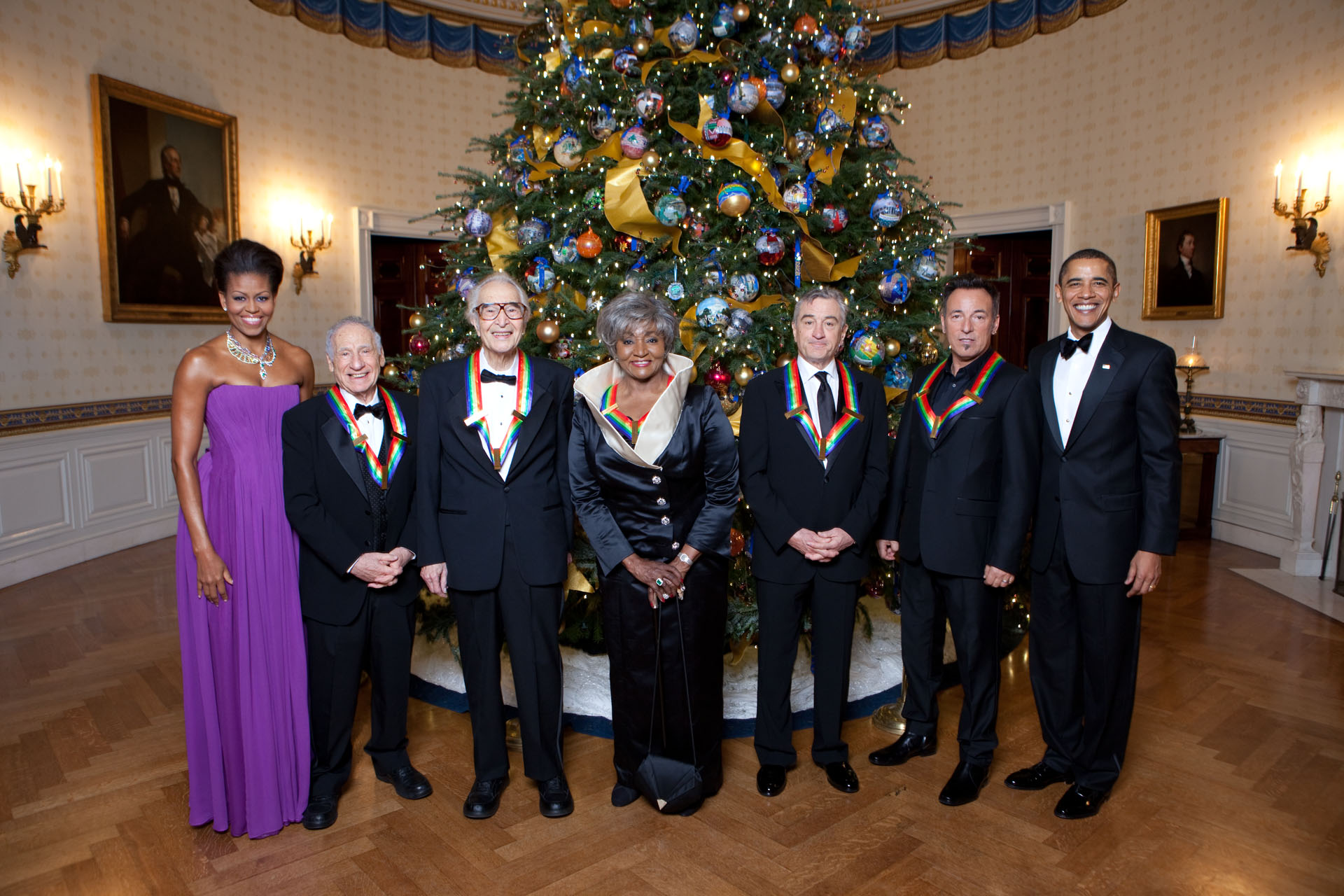
Kennedy Center honorees 2009 Mel Brooks, Dave Brubeck, Grace Bumbry, Robert De Niro, and Bruce Springsteen, with President Barack Obama and First Lady Michelle Obama in the Blue Room, White House, December 6, 2009

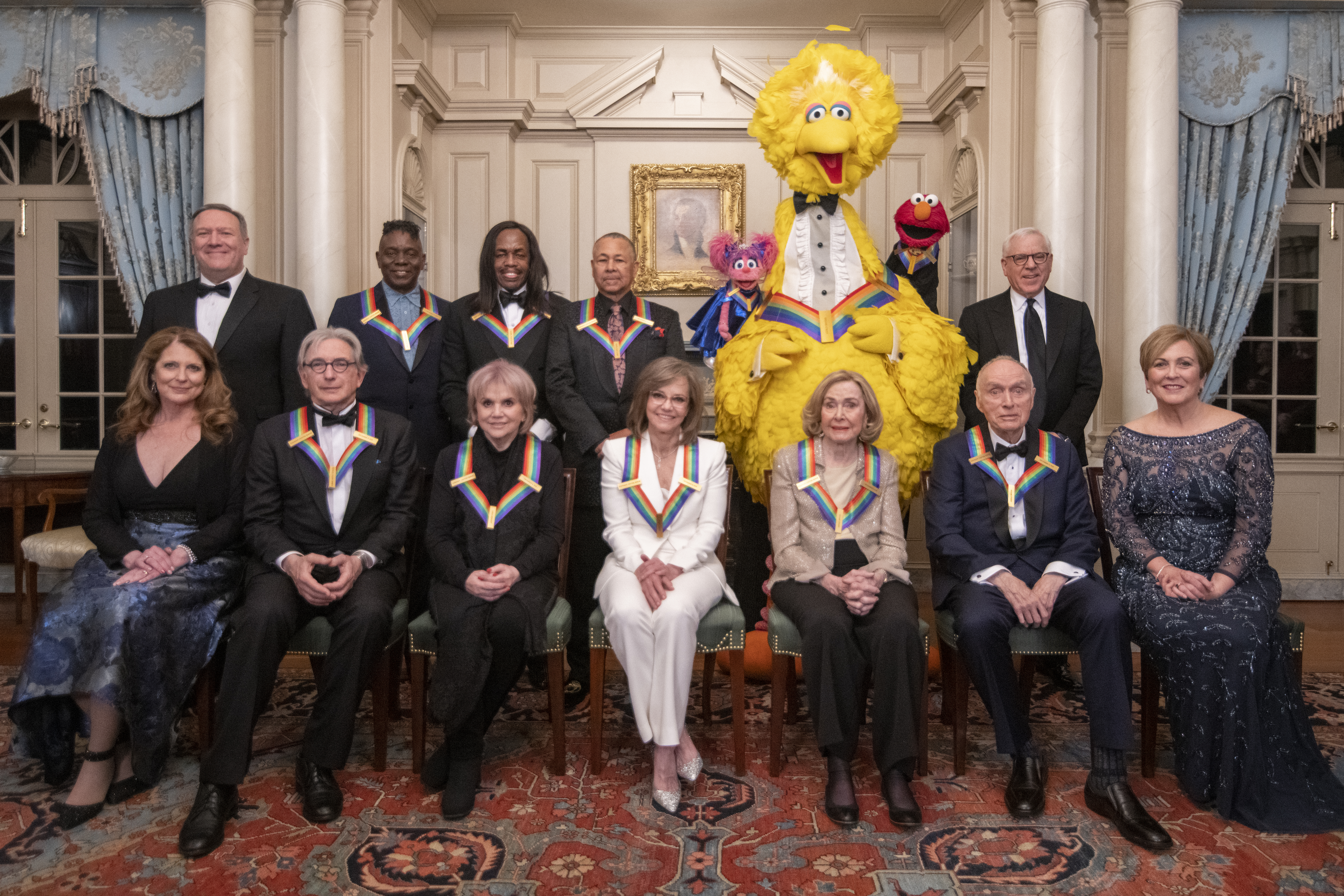
The 2019 honorees Michael Tilson Thomas, Earth, Wind & Fire, Linda Ronstadt, Sally Field and Sesame Street with Secretary of State Mike Pompeo at rear far left

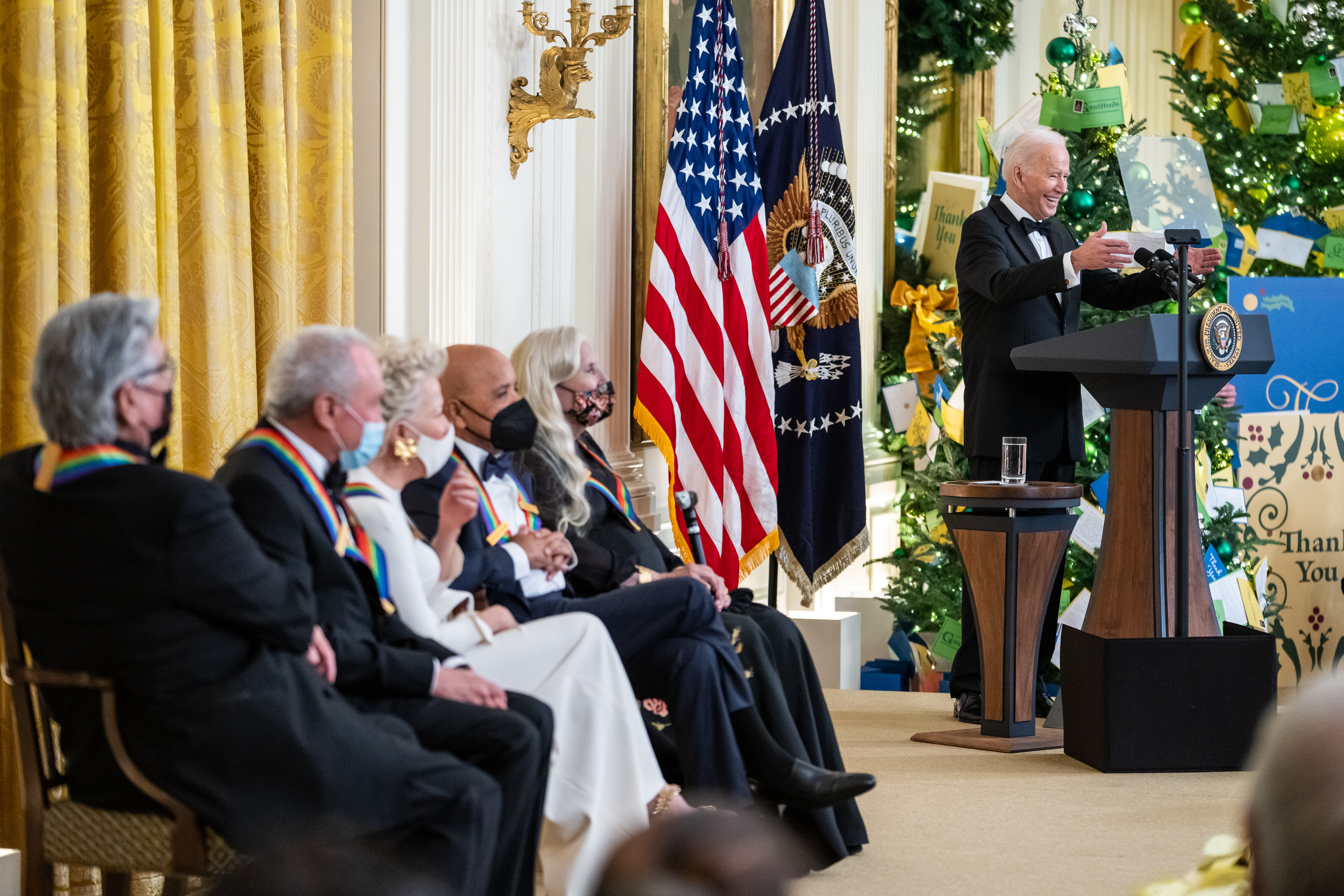
President Joe Biden giving a speech to the 2021 honorees Justino Díaz, Lorne Michaels, Bette Midler, Berry Gordy, and Joni Mitchell

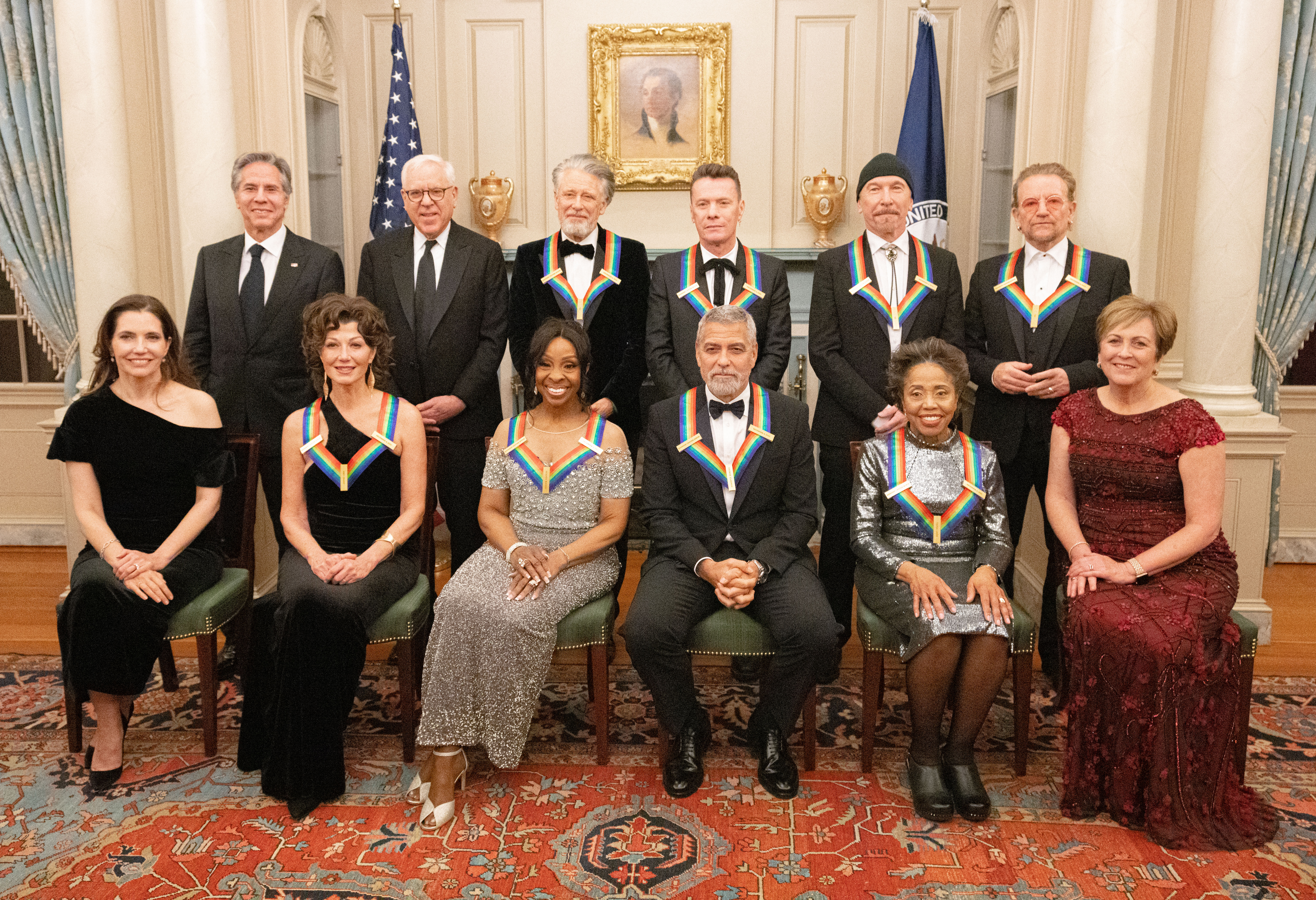
The 2022 honorees Amy Grant, Gladys Knight, U2, George Clooney, and Tania León with Secretary of State Antony Blinken at rear far left

Year	Honorees
1980	Leonard Bernstein, James Cagney, Agnes de Mille, Lynn Fontanne, and Leontyne Price
1981	Count Basie, Cary Grant, Helen Hayes, Jerome Robbins, and Rudolf Serkin
1982	George Abbott, Lillian Gish, Benny Goodman, Gene Kelly, and Eugene Ormandy
1983	Katherine Dunham, Elia Kazan, Frank Sinatra, James Stewart, and Virgil Thomson
1984	Lena Horne, Danny Kaye, Gian Carlo Menotti, Arthur Miller, and Isaac Stern
1985	Merce Cunningham, Irene Dunne, Bob Hope, Alan Jay Lerner and Frederick Loewe, and Beverly Sills
1986	Lucille Ball, Ray Charles, Hume Cronyn and Jessica Tandy, Yehudi Menuhin, and Antony Tudor
1987	Perry Como, Bette Davis, Sammy Davis Jr., Nathan Milstein, and Alwin Nikolais
1988	Alvin Ailey, George Burns, Myrna Loy, Alexander Schneider, and Roger L. Stevens
1989	Harry Belafonte, Claudette Colbert, Alexandra Danilova, Mary Martin, and William Schuman

=== 1990s ===
Year	Honorees
1990	Dizzy Gillespie, Katharine Hepburn, Risë Stevens, Jule Styne, and Billy Wilder
1991	Roy Acuff, Betty Comden and Adolph Green, Fayard and Harold Nicholas, Gregory Peck, and Robert Shaw
1992	Lionel Hampton, Paul Newman and Joanne Woodward, Ginger Rogers, Mstislav Rostropovich, and Paul Taylor
1993	Johnny Carson, Arthur Mitchell, Georg Solti, Stephen Sondheim, and Marion Williams
1994	Kirk Douglas, Aretha Franklin, Morton Gould, Harold Prince, and Pete Seeger
1995	Jacques d'Amboise, Marilyn Horne, B.B. King, Sidney Poitier, and Neil Simon
1996	Edward Albee, Benny Carter, Johnny Cash, Jack Lemmon, and Maria Tallchief
1997	Lauren Bacall, Bob Dylan, Charlton Heston, Jessye Norman, and Edward Villella
1998	Fred Ebb and John Kander, Willie Nelson, André Previn, Shirley Temple Black and Bill Cosby (Note: award rescinded)
1999	Victor Borge, Sean Connery, Judith Jamison, Jason Robards, and Stevie Wonder

=== 2000s ===
Year	Honorees
2000	Mikhail Baryshnikov, Chuck Berry, Plácido Domingo, Clint Eastwood, and Angela Lansbury
2001	Julie Andrews, Van Cliburn, Quincy Jones, Jack Nicholson, and Luciano Pavarotti
2002	James Earl Jones, James Levine, Chita Rivera, Paul Simon, and Elizabeth Taylor
2003	James Brown, Carol Burnett, Loretta Lynn, Mike Nichols, and Itzhak Perlman
2004	Warren Beatty, Ossie Davis and Ruby Dee, Elton John, Joan Sutherland, and John Williams
2005	Tony Bennett, Suzanne Farrell, Julie Harris, Robert Redford, and Tina Turner
2006	Andrew Lloyd Webber, Zubin Mehta, Dolly Parton, Smokey Robinson, and Steven Spielberg
2007	Leon Fleisher, Steve Martin, Diana Ross, Martin Scorsese, and Brian Wilson
2008	Morgan Freeman, George Jones, Barbra Streisand, Twyla Tharp, and The Who (Note: (Pete Townshend and Roger Daltrey))
2009	Mel Brooks, Dave Brubeck, Grace Bumbry, Robert De Niro, and Bruce Springsteen

=== 2010s ===
Year	Honorees	Ref.
2010	Merle Haggard, Jerry Herman, Bill T. Jones, Paul McCartney, and Oprah Winfrey	
2011	Barbara Cook, Neil Diamond, Yo-Yo Ma, Sonny Rollins, and Meryl Streep	
2012	Buddy Guy, Dustin Hoffman, David Letterman, Natalia Makarova, and Led Zeppelin (Note: (John Paul Jones, Jimmy Page and Robert Plant))	
2013	Martina Arroyo, Herbie Hancock, Billy Joel, Shirley MacLaine, and Carlos Santana	
2014	Al Green, Tom Hanks, Patricia McBride, Sting, and Lily Tomlin	
2015	Carole King, George Lucas, Rita Moreno, Seiji Ozawa, and Cicely Tyson	
2016	Martha Argerich, Eagles, (Note: (Don Henley, Glenn Frey, Timothy B. Schmit and Joe Walsh), originally selected for 2015) Al Pacino, Mavis Staples, and James Taylor	
2017	Carmen de Lavallade, Gloria Estefan, LL Cool J, Norman Lear, and Lionel Richie	
2018	Cher, Philip Glass, Reba McEntire, Wayne Shorter, and the creators of Hamilton (Note: (Lin-Manuel Miranda, Thomas Kail, Alex Lacamoire, and Andy Blankenbuehler))	
2019	Earth, Wind & Fire (Note: (Philip Bailey, Verdine White, and Ralph Johnson)), Sally Field, Linda Ronstadt, Michael Tilson Thomas, and Sesame Street (Note: (Lloyd Morrisett and Joan Ganz Cooney))	

=== 2020s ===
Year	Honorees	Ref.
2020	Debbie Allen, Joan Baez, Garth Brooks, Midori, and Dick Van Dyke	
2021	Justino Díaz, Berry Gordy, Lorne Michaels, Bette Midler, and Joni Mitchell	
2022	George Clooney, Amy Grant, Gladys Knight, Tania León, and U2 (Note: (Bono, The Edge, Adam Clayton and Larry Mullen Jr.))	
2023	Billy Crystal, Renée Fleming, Barry Gibb, Queen Latifah, and Dionne Warwick	
2024	Francis Ford Coppola, Grateful Dead, (Note: (Mickey Hart, Bill Kreutzmann, Phil Lesh and Bob Weir)) Bonnie Raitt, Arturo Sandoval, and the Apollo Theater	
2025	Michael Crawford, Gloria Gaynor, KISS, (Note: (Paul Stanley, Gene Simmons, Peter Criss and Ace Frehley)) Sylvester Stallone, and George Strait	
2026	Paul Anka, David Foster, Andy Garcia, David Mamet, and Barbara Mandrell	

== Prospective honorees who declined, canceled or postponed ==
Pianist Vladimir Horowitz was to be an honoree, but the selection committee withdrew the offer when Horowitz conditioned his acceptance on being honored alone and at 4:00 in the afternoon.

Actress Katharine Hepburn declined the committee's first offer, although she relented in 1990.

Doris Day repeatedly turned down the honor because her fear of flying prevented her from attending the ceremony.

When considering Irving Berlin for the 1987 awards because of criticism for overlooking him, the center was informed that Berlin wanted to be honored only if he surpassed his 100th birthday (which would not be until May 1988). He was also in failing health, using a wheelchair following a series of strokes, and could not attend a public event. The Center chose instead to pay special tribute to him at the 1987 Gala. He died in 1989.

Paul McCartney was selected as an honoree in 2002, but was unable to attend due to an "inescapable personal obligation", his cousin's previously planned wedding. After initially saying McCartney's award would be postponed until the following year, the Kennedy Center did not give the award to McCartney in 2003. However, McCartney became a 2010 honoree.

Mel Brooks said he refused the Honor when George W. Bush was in office, due to his distaste for Bush's Iraq policy. He was honored in 2009, the first year Barack Obama was president.

In November 2015, one month before the ceremony, the Eagles postponed their Honors acceptance until the following year because Glenn Frey had health problems that required major surgery and a long recovery period. Despite their absence, they were still honored in 2015 via a performance of "Desperado" by country singer Miranda Lambert. Frey died on January 18, 2016; the center made him and the three surviving Eagles members 2016 honorees.

Tom Cruise declined the honor in 2025, reportedly due to "scheduling conflicts", though there is speculation that it was for political reasons.

== See also ==
- Mark Twain Prize for American Humor, the Kennedy Center's award for contributions to American humor
