= Lloyd N. Morrisett Sr. =

American educator

Lloyd Newton Morrisett (June 23, 1892 – November 25, 1981) was an American educator.

Born in Barretville, Tennessee, he graduated from high school in Edmond, Oklahoma, and received an A.B. degree from the University of Oklahoma in 1917. He earned an A.M. degree (1930) and Ph.D. degree (1934) from Columbia University.

Morrisett married Jessie Ruth Watson on February 18, 1920. They had one son, Lloyd Jr. During the 1930s, he was the Assistant Superintendent of Schools in Yonkers, New York.

In 1941, he accepted an invitation to become the first professor of educational administration at UCLA, where he developed a graduate program in the School of Education for the education and improvement of administrators in a variety of levels of education. As a result, he served as sponsor or committee chairman for 144 candidates for the (Ed.D.), 24 masters (M.A.), and 177 (M.Ed.) degrees.

His first wife, Ruth, died in 1964, and he decided to retire as a professor in the same year. He became a top level consultant to the California Superintendent of Public Instruction. He returned to Oklahoma for a class reunion and again met a woman named Stella Jo Wantland, whom he had dated while attending Oklahoma State Teachers' College (sic) in 1911-13. Their mutual attraction flourished and they married on February 8, 1966. Thereafter they made West Los Angeles their home until his death. (Note: There is no school named Oklahoma State Teachers' College now, but there was a teachers' college established in Edmond in 1890, which continues at present and is named the University of Central Oklahoma (UCO). In 1991, UCO installed a commemorative plaque that honors 36 of the "...most outstanding graduates..." from 1891 to 1991. Lloyd Morisett's name is on that list.)

The phrase "Lloyd N. Morrisett, Professor and Associate Dir., Education Program, U. of Calif." appeared in one of the lists of Richard Nixon's political opponents, commonly referred to as his "Enemies List". There is some amibiguity over whether "Lloyd N. Morrisett" refers to Lloyd N. Morrisett Sr. or Lloyd N. Morrisett Jr., though Morrisett Jr. has stated that be believed it to be referring to himself.
