= List of accolades received by Sesame Street =

Sesame Street awards and nominations
Accolades
Award	Wins	Nominations
Daytime Emmy Awards (including Creative and Children's)	204	
Primetime Emmy Awards	12	
Grammy Awards	11	

Totals
- Wins: 227

This is a list of notable awards won by Sesame Street, an American children's television series which has achieved worldwide recognition. Created by the non-profit Children's Television Workshop (now Sesame Workshop), and first aired in 1969, the series has been regularly acknowledged for its innovative teaching techniques.

== Emmy Awards ==
Year	Category	Nominee	Result
1970	Outstanding Achievement in Children's Programming (Program)	David D. Connell, executive producer; Sam Gibbon, Jon Stone, Lutrelle Horne, producers for Sesame Street	Won
1970	Outstanding Achievement in Children's Programming (Individuals)	Joe Raposo, Jeffrey Moss, music and lyrics, for the song This Way to Sesame Street, Sesame Street	Won
1970	Outstanding Achievement in Children's Programming (Individuals)	Jon Stone, Jeff Moss, Ray Sipherd, Jerry Juhl, Dan Wilcox, Dave Connell, Bruce Hart, Carole Hart, and Virginia Schone, writers, for "Sally Sees Sesame Street", the first episode of Sesame Street	Won
1970	Outstanding New Series	Connell, Gibbon, Stone, Horne for Sesame Street	Nominated
1971	Outstanding Achievement in Children's Programming (Programs)	David Connell, executive producer; Jon Stone, Lutrelle Horne, producers for Sesame Street	Won
1971	Outstanding Achievement in Children's Programming (individuals)	George W. Riesenberger, lighting director for Sesame Street	Nominated
1972	Outstanding Achievement in Children's Programming (Programs)	David D. Connell, executive producer; Jon Stone, producer for Sesame Street	Won
1972	Outstanding Achievement in Children's Programming (individuals)	George W. Riesenberger, lighting director for Sesame Street	Nominated
1973	Outstanding Achievement in Children's Programming (Entertainment-Fictional)	Jon Stone, executive producer, Bob Cunniff, producer for Sesame Street	Won
1973	Outstanding Achievement in Children's Programming (individuals)	Joe Raposo, music director for Sesame Street	Nominated
1973	Outstanding Achievement in Children's Programming (individuals)	Robert G. Myhrum, director for Sesame Street	Nominated
1979 Primetime	Outstanding Children's Program	Christmas Eve on Sesame Street: Jon Stone, executive producer; Dulcy Singer, producer	Won
1979 Primetime	Outstanding Individual Achievement (children's program)	Christmas Eve on Sesame Street: Dave Clark and Tony Di Giroloma, lighting directors	Nominated
1979 Primetime	Outstanding Individual Achievement (children's program)	Christmas Eve on Sesame Street: Gerri Brioso, graphic artist	Nominated
1979 Primetime	Outstanding Children's Program	A Special Sesame Street Christmas: Bob Banner, executive producer	Nominated
1980 Primetime	Outstanding Children's Program	Sesame Street in Puerto Rico: Michael Cozell, producer; Al Hyslop, executive producer	Nominated
1980 Primetime	Outstanding Individual Achievement (children's program)	Sesame Street in Puerto Rico: Nat Mongioi, art director	Nominated
1980 Primetime	Outstanding Individual Achievement (children's program)	Sesame Street in Puerto Rico: Ozzie Alfonso, director	Nominated
1984 Primetime	Outstanding Children's Program	Don't Eat the Pictures	Nominated
1989 Primetime	Outstanding Special Event	Sesame Street: 20 and Still Counting	Won
1989 Primetime	Outstanding Achievement in Music and Lyrics	Sesame Street: 20 and Still Counting: Joe Raposo	Won
1990 Primetime	Outstanding Achievement in Choreography	Sing! Sesame Street Remembers Joe Raposo and His Music: Jacques d'Amboise	Nominated
1990 International	Founders Award	Children's Television Workshop co-founder Joan Ganz Cooney for her work, including Sesame Street	Won
1994 Primetime	Outstanding Children's Program	Sesame Street Jam: A Musical Celebration: Arlene Sherman, executive producer	Nominated
1994 Primetime	Outstanding Children's Program	Sesame Street's All-Star 25th Birthday: Stars and Streets Forever: Franklin Getchall, co-executive producer; Marjorie Kalins, co-executive producer; Joel Lipman, coordinating producer; Marc Sachnoff, producer; Andrew Solt, executive producer; Emily Squires, co-producer; Victoria Strong, producer; Greg Vines, Supervising Producer	Nominated
2004 Primetime	Outstanding Children's Program	The Street We Live On: Dr. Lewis Bernstein, executive producer; Tim Carter, producer; Kevin Clash, co-executive producer; Melissa Dino, producer; Karen Ialacci, producer; Carol-Lynn Parente, producer	Nominated
2004 Primetime	Outstanding Music And Lyrics	The Street We Live On: Lou Berger, lyricist; Mike Renzi, composer	Nominated
2012 Primetime	Outstanding Children's Nonfiction, Reality or Reality-Competition Program	Sesame Street: Growing Hope Against Hunger	Won
2017 Primetime	Outstanding Children's Program	Once Upon a Sesame Street Christmas	Won
2018 Primetime	Outstanding Children's Program	The Magical Wand Chase: A Sesame Street Special	Won
2019 Primetime	Outstanding Children's Program	When You Wish Upon A Pickle: A Sesame Street Special	Won

Note that 1988 "Outstanding Children's Program" nominee A Muppet Family Christmas included Sesame Street characters.

== Daytime Emmy Awards ==
=== 1976 ===
- Won - Outstanding Individual Achievement in Any Area of Creative Technical Crafts (Don Sahlin, Kermit Love, Caroly Wilcox, John Lovelady, Rollin Krewson, costumes and props for the Muppets)
- Won - Outstanding Individual Achievement in Children's Programming (Jim Henson, Frank Oz, Jerry Nelson, Caroll Spinney, Richard Hunt), performers)
- Nominated - Outstanding Children's Instructional Programming - Series and Specials
- Nominated - Outstanding Individual Achievement in Children's Programming (Gerri Brioso, graphic designer)

=== 1977 ===
- Won - Outstanding Children's Instructional Programming - Series and Specials

=== 1978 ===
- Nominated - Outstanding Children's Instructional Series

=== 1979 ===
- Won - Outstanding Individual Achievement in Children's Programming (Jim Henson, Frank Oz, Caroll Spinney, Jerry Nelson, Richard Hunt, performers)
- Won - Outstanding Individual Achievement in Children's Programming (Dick Maitland, Roy Carch, sound effects)
- Nominated - Outstanding Children's Instructional Series

=== 1980 ===
- Won - Outstanding Children's Informational/Instructional Series/Specials
- Won - Outstanding Individual Achievement in Children's Programming (Steve Zink, director of photography)
- Nominated - Outstanding Individual Achievement in Children's Programming (Tony Di Girolamo, lighting director)

=== 1981 ===
- Won - Outstanding Achievement in Children's Programming - Lighting Direction
- Won - Outstanding Individual Achievement in Children's Programming - Audio
- Won - Special Classification of Outstanding Individual Achievement - Puppet Design, Construction and Costuming
- Nominated - Outstanding Achievement in Children's Programming - Graphics and Animation Design
- Nominated - Outstanding Children's Informational/Instructional Series
- Nominated - Outstanding Individual Achievement in Children's Programming - Writers

=== 1982 ===
- Nominated - Outstanding Children's Informational/Instructional Series
- Nominated - Outstanding Individual Achievement in Children's Programming - Lighting Director
- Nominated - Outstanding Music Composition/Direction in Children's Programming
- Nominated - Outstanding Writing for Children's Programming

=== 1983 ===
- Won - Outstanding Children's Informational/Instructional Series
- Won - Outstanding Individual Achievement in Children's Programming - Art Direction/Scenic Design/Set Decoration
- Won - Outstanding Individual Achievement in Children's Programming - Graphic Design
- Nominated - Outstanding Individual Achievement in Children's Programming - Lighting Direction (William C. Knight)
- Nominated - Outstanding Individual Achievement in Children's Programming - Lighting Direction (Randy Nordstrom)
- Nominated - Outstanding Individual Achievement in Children's Programming - Writing
- Nominated - Outstanding Individual Direction in Children's Programming
- Nominated - Outstanding Music Composition/Direction in Children's Programming

=== 1984 ===
- Won - Outstanding Individual Achievement in Children's Programming - Lighting Direction
- Won - Outstanding Individual Achievement in Technical Crafts in Children's Programming - Audio
- Won - Outstanding Individual Achievement in Technical Crafts in Children's Programming - Technical Direction
- Won - Outstanding Writing in Children's Programming
- Won - Special Classification of Outstanding Individual Achievement - Performers (Caroll Spinney)
- Nominated - Outstanding Children's Informational/Instructional Series
- Nominated - Outstanding Individual Achievement in Technical Crafts in Children's Programming - Associate Direction/Videotape Editing

=== 1985 ===
- Won - Outstanding Achievement in Video Tape Editing
- Won - Outstanding Children's Series
- Nominated - Outstanding Directing in Children's Programming
- Nominated - Outstanding Writing in a Children's Series

=== 1986 ===
- Won - Outstanding Achievement in Art Direction/Set Direction/Scenic Design
- Won - Outstanding Achievement in Costume Design
- Won - Outstanding Children's Series
- Won - Outstanding Writing in a Children's Series
- Nominated - Outstanding Achievement in Lighting Direction
- Nominated - Outstanding Achievement in Live and Tape Sound Mixing and Sound Effects
- Nominated - Outstanding Achievement in Videotape Editing
- Nominated - Outstanding Individual Achievement in Children's Programming - Directing (Lisa Simon)
- Nominated - Outstanding Individual Achievement in Children's Programming - Directing (Emily Squires)
- Nominated - Outstanding Individual Achievement in Children's Programming - Directing (Jon Stone)

=== 1987 ===
- Won - Outstanding Children's Series
- Won - Outstanding Writing in a Children's Series
- Nominated - Outstanding Achievement in Costume Design
- Nominated - Outstanding Achievement in Lighting Direction
- Nominated - Outstanding Directing in Children's Programming

=== 1988 ===
- Won - Outstanding Live and Tape Sound Mixing and Sound Effects
- Won - Outstanding Writing in a Children's Series
- Won - Outstanding Children's Series
- Nominated - Outstanding Achievement in Art Direction/Set Direction/Scenic Design
- Nominated - Outstanding Achievement in Costume Design
- Nominated - Outstanding Achievement in Videotape Editing

=== 1989 ===
- Won - Outstanding Music Direction and Composition
- Won - Outstanding Writing in a Children's Series
- Nominated - Outstanding Achievement in Art Direction/Set Direction/Scenic Design
- Nominated - Outstanding Achievement in Costume Design
- Nominated - Outstanding Achievement in Lighting Direction
- Nominated - Outstanding Children's Series
- Nominated - Outstanding Performer in a Children's Series (Sonia Manzano)

=== 1990 ===
- Won - Outstanding Achievement in Art Direction/Set Decoration/Scenic Design
- Won - Outstanding Achievement in Costume Design
- Won - Outstanding Achievement in Lighting Direction
- Won - Outstanding Achievement in Music Direction and Composition
- Won - Outstanding Achievement in Videotape Editing
- Won - Outstanding Performer in a Children's Series (Kevin Clash)
- Won - Outstanding Writing in a Children's Series

=== 1991 ===
- Won - Outstanding Achievement in Lighting Direction
- Won - Outstanding Children's Series
- Won - Outstanding Writing in a Children's Series

=== 1992 ===
- Won - Outstanding Children's Series
- Won - Outstanding Live and Tape Sound Mixing and Sound Effects
- Won - Outstanding Multiple Camera Editing
- Won - Outstanding Writing in a Children's Series
- Nominated - Outstanding Performer in a Children's Series (Sonia Manzano)

=== 1993 ===
- Won - Outstanding Art Direction/Set Decoration/Scenic Design
- Nominated - Outstanding Performer in a Children's Series (Jerry Nelson)

=== 1994 ===
- Won - Outstanding Costume Design
- Won - Outstanding Lighting Direction
- Won - Outstanding Children's Series
- Won - Outstanding Writing in a Children's Series
- Won - Outstanding Multiple Camera Editing
- Won - Outstanding Technical Direction/Electronic Camera/Video Control
- Won - Outstanding Art Direction/Set Decoration/Scenic Design
- Nominated - Outstanding Performer in a Children's Series (Ruth Buzzi)

=== 1995 ===
- Won - Outstanding Directing in a Children's Series
- Won - Outstanding Pre-School Children's Series
- Won - Outstanding Writing in a Children's Series
- Won - Outstanding Multiple Camera Editing
- Nominated - Outstanding Performer in a Children's Series (Martin P. Robinson)

=== 1996 ===
- Won - Outstanding Multiple Camera Editing
- Won - Outstanding Pre-School Children's Series
- Nominated - Outstanding Achievement in Lighting Direction
- Nominated - Outstanding Achievement in Makeup
- Nominated - Outstanding Achievement in Music Direction and Composition
- Nominated - Outstanding Art Direction/Set Direction/Scenic Design
- Nominated - Outstanding Costume Design or Costuming
- Nominated - Outstanding Directing in a Children's Series
- Nominated - Outstanding Hairstyling
- Nominated - Outstanding Writing in a Children's Series

=== 1997 ===
- Won - Outstanding Pre-School Children's Series
- Nominated - Outstanding Achievement in Costume Design/Styling
- Won - Outstanding Children's Special - (Elmo Saves Christmas)
- Won - Outstanding Costume Design/Styling - (Elmo Saves Christmas)
- Nominated - Outstanding Achievement in Sound Mixing - Special Class
- Nominated - Outstanding Art Direction/Set Direction/Scenic Design
- Nominated - Outstanding Directing in a Children's Series
- Nominated - Outstanding Hairstyling
- Nominated - Outstanding Music Direction and Composition
- Nominated - Outstanding Original Song
- Nominated - Outstanding Performer in a Children's Series (Kevin Clash)
- Nominated - Outstanding Writing in a Children's Series

=== 1998 ===
- Won - Outstanding Achievement in Sound Mixing - Special Class
- Won - Outstanding Directing in a Children's Series
- Won - Outstanding Pre-School Series
- Won - Outstanding Writing in a Children's Series
- Nominated - Outstanding Achievement in Art Direction/Set Direction/Scenic Design
- Nominated - Outstanding Achievement in Hairstyling
- Nominated - Outstanding Achievement in Technical Direction/Electronic Camera/Video Control
- Nominated - Outstanding Costume Design/Styling
- Nominated - Outstanding Performer in a Children's Series (Caroll Spinney)

=== 1999 ===
- Won - Outstanding Costume Design/Styling
- Won - Outstanding Multiple Camera Editing
- Won - Outstanding Pre-School Children's Series
- Won - Outstanding Writing in a Children's Series
- Nominated - Outstanding Art Direction/Set Decoration/Scenic Design
- Nominated - Outstanding Directing in a Children's Series
- Nominated - Outstanding Music Direction and Composition
- Nominated - Outstanding Performer in a Children's Series (Kevin Clash)
- Nominated - Outstanding Performer in a Children's Series (Caroll Spinney)
- Nominated - Outstanding Sound Editing
- Nominated - Outstanding Sound Mixing

=== 2000 ===
- Won - Outstanding Pre-School Children's Series
- Nominated - Outstanding Achievement in Art Direction/Set)
- Nominated - Outstanding Achievement in Costume Design/Styling
- Nominated - Outstanding Achievement in Hairstyling
- Nominated - Outstanding Achievement in Lighting Direction
- Nominated - Outstanding Achievement in Makeup
- Nominated - Outstanding Achievement in Multiple Camera Editing
- Nominated - Outstanding Achievement in Music Direction and Composition
- Nominated - Outstanding Achievement in Sound
- Nominated - Outstanding Achievement in Sound Mixing
- Nominated - Outstanding Directing in a Children's Series
- Nominated - Outstanding Performer in a Children's Series (Kevin Clash)
- Nominated - Outstanding Writing in a Children's Series

=== 2001 ===
- Won - Outstanding Achievement in Costume Design/Styling
- Won - Outstanding Pre-School Children's Series
- Won - Outstanding Writing in a Children's Series
- Nominated - Outstanding Achievement in Art Direction/Set
- Nominated - Outstanding Achievement in Hairstyling
- Nominated - Outstanding Achievement in Lighting Direction
- Nominated - Outstanding Achievement in Makeup
- Nominated - Outstanding Achievement in Multiple Camera Editing
- Nominated - Outstanding Achievement in Music Direction and Composition
- Nominated - Outstanding Achievement in Sound Mixing
- Nominated - Outstanding Achievement in Technical Direction/Electronic
- Nominated - Outstanding Directing in a Children's Series
- Nominated - Outstanding Performer in a Children's Series (Kevin Clash)

=== 2002 ===
- Won - Outstanding Achievement in Costume Design/Styling
- Won - Outstanding Achievement in Music Direction and Composition
- Won - Outstanding Achievement in Sound Mixing - Special Class
- Won - Outstanding Directing in a Children's Series
- Won - Outstanding Pre-School Children's Series
- Won - Outstanding Writing in a Children's Series
- Nominated - Outstanding Achievement in Art Direction/Set Decoration/Scenic Design
- Nominated - Outstanding Achievement in Hairstyling
- Nominated - Outstanding Achievement in Lighting Direction
- Nominated - Outstanding Achievement in Multiple Camera Editing
- Nominated - Outstanding Achievement in Technical Direction/Electronic
- Nominated - Outstanding Performer in a Children's Series (Kevin Clash)

=== 2003 ===
- Won - Outstanding Achievement in Costume Design/Styling
- Won - Outstanding Achievement in Main Title Design
- Won - Outstanding Achievement in Music Direction and Composition
- Won - Outstanding Achievement in Technical Direction/Electronic
- Won - Outstanding Pre-School Children's Series
- Won - Outstanding Writing in a Children's Series
- Nominated - Outstanding Achievement in Art Direction/Set
- Nominated - Outstanding Achievement in Makeup
- Nominated - Outstanding Achievement in Multiple Camera Editing
- Nominated - Outstanding Achievement in Sound Mixing - Live Action and Animation
- Nominated - Outstanding Directing in a Children's Series
- Nominated - Outstanding Performer in a Children's Series (Kevin Clash)

=== 2004 ===
- Won - Outstanding Achievement in Costume Design/Styling
- Won - Outstanding Achievement in Lighting Direction
- Won - Outstanding Achievement in Multiple Camera Editing
- Won - Outstanding Achievement in Sound Mixing - Live Action and Animation
- Won - Outstanding Directing in a Children's Series
- Won - Outstanding Pre-School Children's Series
- Nominated - Outstanding Achievement in Art Direction/Set Decoration/Scenic Design
- Nominated - Outstanding Achievement in Music Direction and Composition
- Nominated - Outstanding Performer in a Children's Series (Kevin Clash)
- Nominated - Outstanding Performer in a Children's Series (David Rudman)
- Nominated - Outstanding Writing in a Children's Series

=== 2005 ===
- Won - Outstanding Achievement in Art Direction/Set Decoration/Scenic Design
- Won - Outstanding Directing in a Children's Series
- Won - Outstanding Performer in a Children's Series (Kevin Clash)
- Won - Outstanding Pre-School Children's Series
- Nominated - Outstanding Achievement in Costume Design/Styling
- Nominated - Outstanding Achievement in Multiple Camera Editing
- Nominated - Outstanding Achievement in Lighting Direction
- Nominated - Outstanding Achievement in Music Direction and Composition
- Nominated - Outstanding Original Song: (for "Baby You're So Smart")
- Nominated - Outstanding Original Song: (for "Things Change")
- Nominated - Outstanding Original Song: (for "Who Will Be My Friend?")
- Nominated - Outstanding Achievement in Sound Mixing
- Nominated - Outstanding Writing in a Children's Series

=== 2006 ===
- Won - Outstanding Achievement in Art Direction/Set Decoration/Scenic Design
- Won - Outstanding Achievement in Costume Design/Styling
- Won - Outstanding Achievement in Multiple Camera Editing
- Won - Outstanding Achievement in Music Direction And Composition
- Won - Outstanding Performer In A Children's Series (Kevin Clash)
- Won - Outstanding Pre-School Children's Series
- Won - Outstanding Achievement in Sound Mixing - Live Action and Animation
- Won - Outstanding Writing In A Children's Series
- Nominated - Outstanding Achievement in Lighting Direction
- Nominated - Outstanding Achievement in Technical Direction/Electronic Camera/Video
- Nominated - Outstanding Directing In A Children's Series

=== 2007 ===
- Won - Outstanding Achievement in Costume Design/Styling
- Won - Outstanding Achievement in Multiple Camera Editing
- Won - Outstanding Achievement in Music Direction and Composition
- Won - Outstanding Achievement in Sound Mixing - Live Action and Animation
- Won - Outstanding Directing in a Children's Series
- Won - Outstanding Performer in a Children's Series (Caroll Spinney)
- Won - Outstanding Performer in a Children's Series (Kevin Clash)
- Won - Outstanding Pre-School Children's Series
- Nominated - Outstanding Achievement in Art Direction/Set Decoration/Scenic Design
- Nominated - Outstanding Achievement in Lighting Direction
- Nominated - Outstanding Achievement in Sound Editing - Live Action and Animation
- Nominated - Outstanding Writing in a Children's Series

=== 2008 ===
- Won - Outstanding Pre-School Children's Series
- Nominated - Outstanding Achievement in Costume Design/Styling
- Nominated - Outstanding Achievement in Costume Design/Styling
- Nominated - Outstanding Achievement in Main Title Design
- Nominated - Outstanding Achievement in Makeup
- Nominated - Outstanding Achievement in Multiple Camera Editing
- Nominated - Outstanding Achievement in Sound Mixing - Live Action and Animation
- Nominated - Outstanding Achievement in Technical Direction/Electronic Camera/Video Control
- Nominated - Outstanding Directing in a Children's Series
- Nominated - Outstanding Original Song - Children's and Animation ("Get Up, Get Out!")
- Nominated - Outstanding Original Song - Children's and Animation ("See the Signs")
- Nominated - Outstanding Performer in a Children's Series (Kevin Clash)
- Nominated - Outstanding Writing in a Children's Series

=== 2009 ===
- Won - Outstanding Costume Design/Styling
- Won - Outstanding Directing in a Children's Series
- Won - Outstanding New Approaches - Daytime Children's
- Won - Outstanding Performer in a Children's Series (Kevin Clash)
- Won - Lifetime Achievement Award
- Nominated - Outstanding Achievement in Lighting Direction
- Nominated - Outstanding Achievement in Music Direction and Composition
- Nominated - Outstanding Original Song - Children's and Animation ("I Don't Wanna Be a Prince")
- Nominated - Outstanding Original Song - Children's and Animation ("Elmo's Ducks")
- Nominated - Outstanding Original Song - Children's and Animation ("The Additional Expedition")
- Nominated - Outstanding Performer in a Children's Series (Leslie Carrara)
- Nominated - Outstanding Performer in a Children's Series (Christopher Knowings)
- Nominated - Outstanding Performer in a Children's Series (Martin P. Robinson)
- Nominated - Outstanding Pre-School Children's Series
- Nominated - Outstanding Writing in a Children's Series

=== 2010 ===
- Won - Outstanding Individual in Animation - character designer for Abby's Flying Fairy School
- Won - Outstanding Performer in a Children's Series (Kevin Clash)
- Won - Outstanding Performer in a Children's Series (Joey Mazzarino)
- Won - Outstanding Costume Design/Styling
- Won - Outstanding Directing in a Children's Series
- Won - Outstanding Multiple Camera Editing
- Won - Outstanding Writing in a Children's Series
- Won - Outstanding Pre-School Children's Series

=== 2011 ===
- Won - Outstanding Art Direction/Set Decoration/Scenic Design
- Won - Outstanding Costume Design/Styling
- Won - Outstanding Directing in a Children's Series
- Won - Outstanding Multiple Camera Editing
- Won - Outstanding Original Song - Children's and Animation - What I Am
- Won - Outstanding Performer in a Children's Series (Kevin Clash)
- Won - Outstanding Pre-School Children's Series
- Won - Outstanding Technical Direction/Electronic Camera/Video Control

=== 2012 ===
- Won - Outstanding Directing in a Children's Series
- Won - Outstanding Multiple Camera Editing
- Won - Outstanding Performer in a Children's Series (Kevin Clash)
- Won - Outstanding Pre-School Children's Series
- Won - Outstanding Sound Editing - Live Action
- Won - Outstanding Sound Mixing - Live Action
- Won - Outstanding Technical Direction/Electronic Camera/Video Control
- Won - Outstanding Writing in a Children's Series

=== 2013 ===
- Won - Outstanding Directing in a Children's Series
- Won - Outstanding Main Title and Graphic Design
- Won - Outstanding Multiple Camera Editing
- Won - Outstanding Performer in a Children's Series (Kevin Clash)
- Won - Outstanding Pre-School Children's Series
- Won - Outstanding Sound Editing - Live Action
- Won - Outstanding Writing in a Children's Series

=== 2014 ===
- Won - Outstanding Directing in a Children's Series
- Won - Outstanding Multiple Camera Editing
- Won - Outstanding Pre-School Children's Series
- Won - Outstanding Sound Editing - Live Action
- Won - Outstanding Sound Mixing - Live Action
- Won - Outstanding Writing in a Children's Series

=== 2015 ===
- Won - Outstanding Costume Design/Styling
- Won - Outstanding Multiple Camera Editing
- Won - Outstanding Original Song - Power of Yet
- Won - Outstanding Sound Editing - Live Action
- Won - Outstanding Writing in a Children's or Pre-School Children's Series

=== 2016 ===
- Won - Outstanding Pre-School Children's Series
- Won - Outstanding Sound Editing - Live Action
- Won - Outstanding Sound Mixing - Live Action

=== 2017 ===
- Won - Outstanding Art Direction/Set Decoration/Scenic Design
- Won - Outstanding Directing in a Children's, Pre-School Children's or Family Viewing Program
- Won - Outstanding Sound Editing - Live Action
- Won - Outstanding Writing in a Children's, Pre-School Children's or Family Viewing Program
- Won - Outstanding Pre-School Children's Series

=== 2018 ===
- Won - Outstanding Original Song - A Song About Songs
- Won - Outstanding Sound Editing - Live Action
- Won - Outstanding Multiple Camera Editing
- Won - Outstanding Technical Team
- Won - Outstanding Art Direction/Set Decoration/Scenic Design
- Won - Outstanding Writing in a Children's, Pre-School Children's or Family Viewing Program
- Won - Outstanding Pre-School Children's Series
- Won - Outstanding Special Class - Short Format Daytime Program - Twinkle Twinkle Little Star with Julia & Elmo

=== 2019 ===
- Won - Outstanding Sound Mixing
- Won - Outstanding Multiple Camera Editing
- Won - Outstanding Preschool Children's Series

=== 2020 ===
- Won - Outstanding Technical Team - Sesame Street's 50th Anniversary Celebration
- Won - Outstanding Writing in a Special Class Special - Sesame Street's 50th Anniversary Celebration
- Won - Outstanding Directing in a Children's, Young Adult, or Animated Program
- Won - Outstanding Main Title and Graphic Design for a Lifestyle and Animated Program - Sesame Street's 50th Anniversary Celebration
- Won - Outstanding Multiple Camera Editing - Sesame Street's 50th Anniversary Celebration
- Won - Outstanding Special Effects Costume, Makeup and Hairstyling - Sesame Street
- Won - Outstanding Principal Performance in a Daytime Program (Ryan Dillon) - Sesame Street's 50th Anniversary Celebration
- Won - Outstanding Pre-School Children's Series
- Won - Outstanding Short Form Children's Program - Sesame Street In Communities: Meet Salia
- Won - Outstanding Special Class Special - Sesame Street's 50th Anniversary Celebration
- Nominated - Outstanding Short Form Children's Program - Sesame Street In Communities: A Place For You
- Nominated - Outstanding Daytime Promotional Announcement - Brand Image Campaign - Network or Program - Sesame Street 50th Memories #ThisIsMyStreet Campaign
- Nominated - Outstanding Host for a Daytime Program (Joseph Gordon-Levitt) - Sesame Street's 50th Anniversary Celebration
- Nominated - Outstanding Writing for a Children's or Young Adult Program
- Nominated - Outstanding Lighting Direction
- Nominated - Outstanding Sound Mixing
- Nominated - Outstanding Art Direction/Set Decoration/Scenic Design

=== 2021 ===
- Won - Outstanding Technical Team
- Won - Outstanding Directing for a Preschool, Children's or Family Viewing Program
- Won - Outstanding Writing for a Preschool, Children's or Family Viewing Program - The Power of We: A Sesame Street Special
- Won - Outstanding Preschool, Children's or Family Viewing Program - The Power of We: A Sesame Street Special

== Children's and Family Emmy Awards ==
Year	Award, Category	Nominee	Result
2022	Outstanding Preschool Series	Sesame Street	Won
2022	Outstanding Fiction Special	See Us Coming Together: A Sesame Street Special	Nominated
2022	Outstanding Non-Fiction Program	Sesame Street in Communities: Talking About Race	Nominated
2022	Outstanding Short Form Program	Sesame Street in Communities: Explaining Race #ComingTogether	Nominated
2022	Outstanding Lighting Design for a Live Action Program	Sesame Street	Nominated
2022	Outstanding Directing for a Multiple Camera Program	Sesame Street	Nominated
2022	Outstanding Editing for a Multiple Camera Program	Sesame Street	Nominated
2022	Outstanding Original Song	"Friends with a Penguin"	Won
2022	Outstanding Writing for a Live Action Preschool or Children's Program	See Us Coming Together: A Sesame Street Special	Nominated
2022	Outstanding Writing for a Live Action Preschool or Children's Program	Sesame Street	Nominated

== Other ==
Year	Award, Category	Nominee	Result
1969	Peabody Award	For the 1969 season	Won
1989	Peabody Award	For the 1989 season	Won
1992–1993	Young Artist Awards	"Outstanding Youth Host in a TV Magazine, News or Variety Show": Savion Glover	Nominated
1998–1999	Young Artist Awards	"Best Family Feature Film - Animated": Elmo in Grouchland	Nominated
1999	Foreign Language Advocacy Award	For multilingual programming and international partner initiatives	Honoured
2007	Common Ground Awards	Gary Knell and Sesame Workshop with the Lifetime Achievement Award	Honoured
1991	Hollywood Walk of Fame	Star at 6631 Hollywood Blvd for Jim Henson	Honoured
1994	Hollywood Walk of Fame	Star at 7021 Hollywood Blvd for Big Bird	Honoured
2017	American Ingenuity Award	Social Progress	Honoured
2018	Institutional Peabody Award	For 50 years of Sesame Street	Won

== Awards and nominations for international co-productions ==
Year	Award, Category	Nominee	Result
1999	Gemini Awards, Best Performance in a Pre-School Program or Series	Sheila McCarthy on Sesame Park	Won
1999	Gemini Awards, Best Performance in a Pre-School Program or Series	Pier Kohl on Sesame Park	Nominated
2001	Gemini Awards, Best Pre-School Program or Series	Wendy Smith, Duncan Lamb, Susan Sheehan of Sesame Park	Won
2001	Gemini Awards, Best Performance in a Pre-School Program or Series	Eric Peterson as Old King Cole on Sesame Park	Won
2001	Gemini Awards, Best Performance in a Pre-School Program or Series	Pier Kohl on Sesame Park	Nominated
2006	International Emmy Awards, Children & Young People	5, Rue Sésame	Semi-finalist
2006	International Emmy Awards, Children & Young People	Plaza Sésamo	Semi-finalist
