= Sesame Street: The Musical =

Off-Broadway musical

Sesame Street: The Musical is an off-Broadway production featuring the Muppets from Sesame Street. Produced by Sesame Workshop and Rockefeller Productions, the show was first announced in an exclusive interview with Variety on June 7, 2022, and notably differed from its contemporaries in its use of live puppeteering as opposed to the mascot characters found in Sesame Street Live.

The musical featured a selection of fan-favorite songs from the television show, as well as new material written specifically for the production. The new music was composed by Tom Kitt, Helen Park, and Nate Edmonson.

Previews began at Theatre Row on September 8, 2022, before officially opening on September 22, 2022. The original production's limited run was completed on November 22, 2022.

== Plot ==
Elmo, Cookie Monster, Grover, Abby Cadabby, Rosita, Bert, Ernie, Oscar the Grouch, Count Von Count, and Gabrielle have come together to present their flashy new musical, but disaster strikes when stage manager Barry the Sheep realizes they neglected to hire a special guest star. Now it is up to the team to find a guest star, and teach them the ins and outs of theatre, before the big finale!

== Songs ==
1. "Sesame Street Theme"
2. "Hey! We're in a Musical!" (original song)
3. "C Is for Cookie / Me Am What Me Am"
4. "Elmo's Got the Moves"
5. "Sing After Me"
6. "I Love Trash"
7. "Rubber Duckie"
8. "The Batty Bat"
9. "Number of the Day"
10. "Imagination" (original song)
11. "Fuzzy and Blue"
12. "Belly Breathe"
13. "Pinball Number Count"
14. "But I Like You"
15. "Believe in Yourself"
16. "You Can Be a Star" (original song)
17. "Hey Friend"

== Productions ==
=== Theatre Row (Original Off-Broadway Run) ===
- First Preview - September 8, 2022
- Opening Night - September 22, 2022
- Closing - November 22, 2022

=== Theatre 555 ===
An Off-Broadway revival was announced in June 2023. The run was originally set to close on October 29, 2023, but extended due to popular demand.

- Opening Night - July 29, 2023
- Closing Night - December 31, 2023

=== National Tour ===
A National Tour was announced in November 2023, and was slated to open at the Isis Theatre in Fort Worth, Texas in February 2024. Several weeks after the announcement was made, the run was cancelled.

=== Atlanta ===
In April 2024, the tour was remounted, opening at the Center for Puppetry Arts in Atlanta, Georgia.

- Opening Night - June 4, 2024
- Closing Night - August 5, 2024

=== Washington D.C. ===
A run at the Kennedy Center was announced on May 15, 2025, via the Sesame Street: The Musical Instagram.

- Opening Night - July 10, 2025
- Closing Night - August 31, 2025

== Cast ==
=== Off-Broadway Casts ===
Role	Theatre Row (2022)	Theatre 555 (2023)
Special Guest	Stephen Fala	Genevieve Joers
Puppeteers	Mecca Akbar Mia Castillo Chris Coleman Yanniv Frank Joe Newman-Getzler Joshua Peters Rebecca Lynn Russell Dustin Scully Matteo Villanueva	Mecca Akbar Mia Castillo Yanniv Frank Joe Newman-Getzler Joshua Peters Rebecca Lynn Russell Dustin Scully Matteo Villanueva Anthony White
Swings		Ted Gibson Vicki Oceguera Emaley Rose

=== Atlanta cast ===
- Latoryah Alexander, Beau Brown, Sarah Beth Hester, Kristina Hopkins, Alexander Hudson, Reay Maxwell, Chris McKnight, Anna Oakley, Molly Penny, Evan Hill Phillips, Amy Sweeney

=== D.C. cast ===
- Olivia Bernabe, Mecca Akbar, Julia Feinberg, Yanniv Frank, Natalie Michaels, Joe Newman-Getzler, Vicki Oceguera, Molly Penny, Dustin Scully, Matteo Villanueva

=== Voice cast ===
- Abby Cadabby: Leslie Carrara-Rudolph
- Elmo: Ryan Dillon
- Bert/Grover/Oscar: Eric Jacobson
- Ernie: Peter Linz
- Rosita: Carmen Osbahr
- Gabrielle: Megan Piphus Peace
- Blue Martian: Martin P. Robinson
- Cookie Monster: David Rudman
- Count von Count/Orange Martian: Matt Vogel

== Production credits ==
- Directed by Jonathan Rockefeller
- Score and Orchestration by Nate Edmonson
- Puppets and Costumes by Jim Henson/The Henson Creature Shop
- Props and Set Design by Rockefeller Productions

== See also ==
- Sesame Street
- Sesame Workshop
- Elmo: The Musical
