= Lloyd Morrisett =

American psychologist (1929–2023)

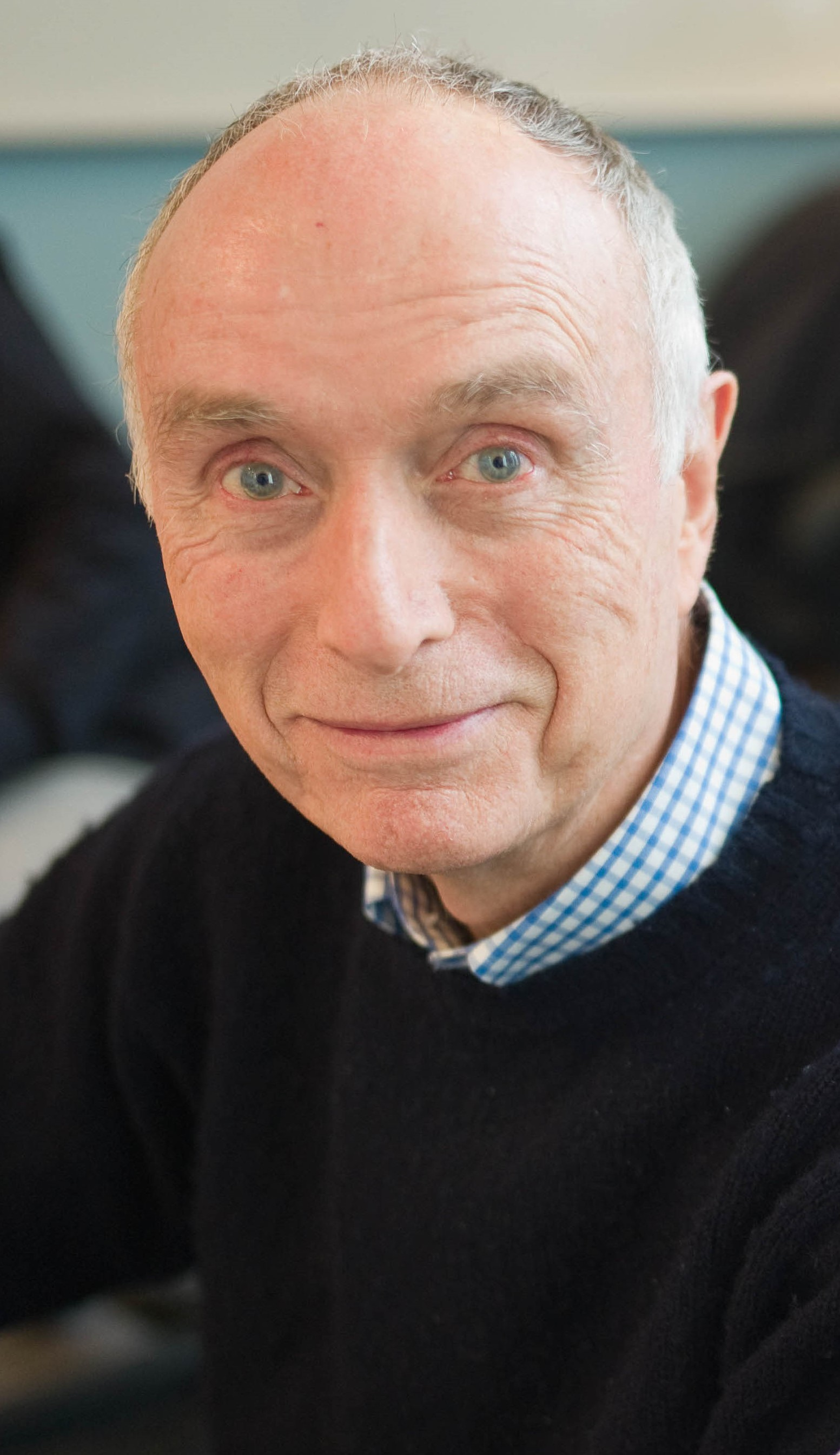
- Morrisett in 2010
- Born: Lloyd Newton Morrisett Jr. November 2, 1929; Oklahoma City, Oklahoma, U.S.
- Died: January 15, 2023 (aged 93); San Diego, California, U.S.
- Education: Oberlin College (BA); Yale University (PhD)
- Occupations: Experimental psychologist, educator, philanthropist
- Known for: Experimental psychologist and founder of the Children's Television Workshop, which created Sesame Street
- Spouse: Mary Pierre
- Children: 2
- Father: Lloyd N. Morrisett Sr.

Lloyd Newton Morrisett Jr. (November 2, 1929 – January 15, 2023) was an American experimental psychologist with a career in education, communications, and philanthropy. He was one of the founders of the Children's Television Workshop (now known as Sesame Workshop), the organization that created the children's television show Sesame Street, which Morrisett created with Joan Ganz Cooney from its debut from 1969 until his death in 2023.

Morrisett was born on November 2, 1929, in Oklahoma City, Oklahoma, the son of Jessie Watson and Lloyd Newton Morrisett Sr. Shortly afterward, the family moved to Yonkers, New York, to escape the hardships brought about by the Dust Bowl and the Great Depression. Afterwards the family relocated to Los Angeles, California, where Morrisett met Julian Ganz, a middle school classmate who would later introduce him to Joan Ganz Cooney, the future co-founder of Children's Television Workshop. Morrisett assumed he was headed for a life of academia like his father, a professor at UCLA. "I was brought up to believe that being a professor was the best job in the world," he said.

== Education and early career ==
Morrisett attended Oberlin College and received his BA in philosophy in 1951. Originally, he had wanted to become a chemist, but after taking a fascinating course in his junior year, he realized he wanted to study experimental psychology. He became an Oberlin College trustee and was chairman of the board from 1975 to 1981. He did graduate work in psychology for two years at UCLA, where he met an assistant professor named Irving Maltzman, whom he describes as "very important, very influential in psychology." Morrisett became Maltzman's research assistant, and together, they co-authored six papers and studies.

Inspired by Maltzman, whose area was human learning, creativity and human thinking, Morrisett attended Yale in 1953 for three years and earned a PhD in experimental psychology. There, he met and apprenticed with Carl I. Hovland, a leading psychologist who founded the Yale Communications and Attitude Change program. In later years, Morrisett would credit that apprenticeship with sparking his interest in communications.

At Yale, Morrisett wrote a dissertation: "The Role of Implicit Practice in Learning." The thesis, which used three activities — including long distance dart throwing — as examples, explored whether or not it is possible to improve performance by thinking about it. Morrisett concluded that in the instance of dart throwing, it is not possible. But in the instance of a two-handed coordination task, it is possible. Today, the dissertation is cited as an important early contribution to sports psychology.

In 1956, Morrisett landed a teaching job in the School of Education at the University of California at Berkeley, but he was having doubts about academic life. It lacked mystery and excitement, he thought, and he was "unimpressed by the seriousness of his students." He joined the Social Science Research Council in New York as a staff member from 1958 to 1959. While there, he met Herbert A. Simon and Allen Newell. Simon and Newell, both faculty members at the Carnegie Institute of Technology (now Carnegie-Mellon), are "credited with laying much of the groundwork for the emerging field of cognitive psychology, which became Morrisett's lifelong scholarly passion." They based their theoretical models on computer simulations of the thought process.

== The Carnegie years ==
Morrisett first encountered the Carnegie Corporation, a philanthropic foundation focused on education, while he was at the Social Science Research Council. Morrisett joined Carnegie as an executive assistant to Gardner in 1959, later becoming vice president of the Carnegie Corporation of New York and of the Carnegie Foundation for the Advancement of Teaching. He stayed with the corporation for ten years. One of the main contributions of Carnegie during those years was the creation of the National Assessment of Educational Progress (NAEP). NAEP is the only nationally representative and continuing assessment of what America's students know and can do in various subject areas.

While at the corporation, Morrisett developed a specialty in early education and also became engaged in projects concerning human creativity. He became increasingly aware of the educational disadvantages of poor and minority children and wanted to find a way to better their access to preschool learning. Under his direction, the foundation supported six experiments to test children's responses to teaching methods. Morrisett claimed, however, that "There was a big discrepancy between what we were doing and what we were trying to accomplish [in reducing the education gap]." Morrisett was frustrated because while the experiments were effective, they reached only a few hundred disadvantaged students.

== Children's Television Workshop ==
In December 1965, as Morrisett's then 3-year-old daughter Sarah watched the test patterns as she waited for her cartoons to start one Sunday morning, her father noticed something. "It struck me there was something fascinating to Sarah about television," he said.

"Sarah Morrisett had memorized an entire repertoire of TV jingles," Michael Davis writes in his book Street Gang: The Complete History of Sesame Street. "It is not too far a stretch to say that Sarah's mastery of jingles led to a central hypothesis of the great experiment that we know as Sesame Street: if television could successfully teach the words and music to advertisements, couldn't it teach children more substantive material by co-opting the very elements that made ads so effective?"

In February 1966, at a dinner party at Cooney's Gramercy Park apartment, she and Morrisett talked about his work with early education. Morrisett says he asked Cooney, "Do you think television can be used to teach young children?" And she said, "I don't know, but I'd like to talk about it." Television seemed like an ideal platform to use in the Carnegie foundation's goal of reaching children.

Using her own knowledge of people in television and Morrisett's knowledge of people in education and psychology, Cooney spent three months interviewing and preparing a report, "The Potential Uses of Television in Pre-School Education." It suggested that advertising techniques could teach letters and numbers, and provided the essential formula for a new pre-school, entertaining and educational television program appealing to both kids and parents. Morrisett and Cooney approached Harold (Doc) Howe, U.S. Commissioner of Education, who put up $4 million — nearly half the start-up money for Children's Television Workshop. Within Carnegie, Morrisett secured another $1 million. The Ford Foundation and other sources donated $3 million.

"Had Morrisett been any less effective in lining up financial support," Lee D. Mitgang writes in his book Big Bird & Beyond, "Cooney's report likely would have become just another long-forgotten foundation idea."

== Sesame Street ==
On November 10, 1969, Sesame Street — starring Jim Henson's Muppets — debuted. "Lloyd underplays his role in the development of Sesame Street," said John Gardner, former president Carnegie Corporation of New York. "He's modest, but people who saw the beginnings of Sesame Street agree that he played a very significant contributing role as a member of that very small group."

As of 2008, the series has received 118 Emmy Awards — more than any other television series. An estimated 77 million Americans watched the series as children. In addition to Sesame Street, at least seventeen indigenous, locally produced versions of the show are seen in countries around the world. Sesame Workshop's other shows have included The Electric Company and Pinky Dinky Doo.

== The Markle Foundation years ==
The year Sesame Street hit the airwaves, with Morrisett as chairman of the board of CTW, he joined the John and Mary Markle Foundation as president. He initiated the foundation's program in communications and information technology, replacing the foundation's previous focus on medicine. In his first year, based on his own path-breaking role as one of the founders of CTW, the foundation supported CTW in developing sound research methods to "undergird its bold and nationally important new programming initiatives."

In his final presidential essay, "Philanthropy and Venture Capital," published in the 1997 annual report, Morrisett wrote: "In September 1969, when I became president of the Markle Foundation, I began to hear questions from friends and acquaintances such as, 'Okay, so you are a foundation president. What do you do, give away money?' Since I did not really believe that 'giving away money' was what we were about, I struggled with my annoyance at the question and even more at not having a ready answer...

"The nagging question, 'so what do you do….,' led to many frustrating conversations and blank looks until I hit upon a useful metaphor that silenced most questions. I said that we were most like a venture capital company, but that instead of financial profit, we measured ourselves by "social benefit."

-Markle Annual Report, 1997

"The years since 1969," he wrote, "have been a voyage of discovery to see if the metaphor, 'venture capital for social benefit' really is the best description of what the Markle Foundation has been trying to do."

== Nixon's Enemies List ==
The phrase "Lloyd N. Morrisett, Professor and Associate Dir., Education Program, U. of Calif." appeared in one of the lists of Richard Nixon's political opponents, commonly referred to as his "Enemies List". There is some ambiguity over whether "Lloyd N. Morrisett" refers to Lloyd N. Morrisett Sr. or Lloyd N. Morrisett Jr., though Morrisett Jr. has stated that he believed it to be referring to himself.

== Personal life and death ==
Morrisett and his wife, the former Mary Pierre, had two daughters. He died of natural causes at his San Diego home, on January 15, 2023, at the age of 93.

== Later activities ==
- Sesame Workshop (Formerly Children's Television Workshop): member, board of trustees 1970–2023; chairman, 1970–2000
- Public Agenda Foundation: member, board of directors 1998–2023
- Tucows, Inc.: member, board of directors 1994–2023

Morrisett was also a board member of RAND (a research institute dealing with domestic public policy and national security issues) for thirty years and chairman of the board for nine years, 1986–1995. He continued as an advisory trustee.

== Honors and awards ==
Award	Organization	Year
Doctor of Humane Letters	Oberlin College	1971
Golden Plate Award	American Academy of Achievement	1971
Doctor of Laws	Northwestern University	1975
Hall of Fame Award	ACT Children's Television	1988
Doctor of Public Policy	Rand Graduate School	1995
Kennedy Center Honors	Shared with Joan Ganz Cooney for Sesame Street	2019
