= Sesame Street =

American children's television show

- Genre: Children's television series; Educational
- Created by: Joan Ganz Cooney; Lloyd Morrisett
- Theme music composer: Joe Raposo; Jon Stone; Bruce Hart
- Opening theme: "Can You Tell Me How to Get to Sesame Street?"
- Ending theme: "Can You Tell Me How to Get to Sesame Street?" (instrumental; seasons 1–45); "Smarter, Stronger, Kinder" (seasons 46–55); "Just Imagine" (instrumental; seasons 56–present)
- Country of origin: United States
- Original language: English
- No. of seasons: 56
- No. of episodes: 4,744 (Note: Season 44 (2013–2014) was the first time episodes were numbered in a seasonal order rather than the numerical and chronological fashion used since the show premiered. For example, episode 4401 means "the 1st episode of the 44th season", not "the 4,401st episode" (it is in fact the 4,328th episode).)

Production
- Executive producers: David Connell (1969–72); Jon Stone (1972–78); Al Hyslop (1978–80); Dulcy Singer (1980–93); Michael Loman (1993–2002); Lewis Bernstein (2003–05); Carol-Lynn Parente (2006–17); Brown Johnson (2017–19); Benjamin Lehmann (2018–present)
- Production locations: Reeves Teletape Studios (1969–92); Unitel Video, Inc. (1987–93); Kaufman Astoria Studios (1993–present)
- Running time: 60 minutes (1969–2014); 30 minutes (2014–present)
- Production company: Sesame Workshop (Note: Known as Children's Television Workshop until 2000)

Original release
- Network: NET
- Release: November 10, 1969 – May 8, 1970
- Network: PBS
- Release: November 9, 1970 – present
- Network: HBO
- Release: January 16, 2016 – July 11, 2020
- Network: HBO Max
- Release: November 12, 2020 – September 11, 2025
- Network: Netflix
- Release: November 10, 2025 – present

Sesame Street is an American educational children's television series that combines live-action, sketch comedy, animation, and puppetry. It is produced by Sesame Workshop (known as the Children's Television Workshop until June 2000) and was created by Joan Ganz Cooney and Lloyd Morrisett. It features Jim Henson's Muppets, and includes short films, with humor and cultural references. It premiered on November 10, 1969, to positive reviews, some controversy, and high viewership. It has aired on the United States national public television provider PBS since its debut, with its first run moving to premium channel HBO on January 16, 2016, then its sister streaming service HBO Max on November 12, 2020, which continued through the service's rebrand as Max in 2023 and as HBO Max in 2025, and most recently Netflix on November 10, 2025.

The show's format consists of a combination of commercial television production elements and techniques that have evolved to reflect changes in American culture and audiences' viewing habits. It was the first children's TV show to use educational goals and a curriculum to shape its content, and the first show whose educational effects were formally studied. Its format and content have undergone significant changes over the years to reflect changes to its curriculum.

Shortly after its creation, its producers developed what came to be called the CTW model (after the production company's previous name), a system of planning, production, and evaluation based on collaboration between producers, writers, educators, and researchers. The show was initially funded by government and private foundations but has become somewhat self-supporting due to revenues from licensing arrangements, international sales, and other media. By 2006, independently produced versions (co-productions) of Sesame Street were broadcast in 20 countries. In 2001, there were over 120 million viewers of various international versions of Sesame Street; and by its 40th anniversary in 2009, it was broadcast in more than 140 countries.

Since its debut, Sesame Street has garnered widespread acclaim, and it is considered one of the greatest television series of all time. By the show's 40th anniversary in 2009 it was the 15th-highest-rated children's television show in the United States. A 1996 survey found that 95% of all American preschoolers had watched it by the time they were three. In 2018, it was estimated that 86 million Americans had watched it as children. As of 2022, it has won 222 Emmy Awards and 11 Grammy Awards, more than any other children's show. Sesame Street remains one of the longest-running shows in the world. In 2019, the series was chosen for preservation in the American Archive of Public Broadcasting by the Library of Congress.

== History ==
Sesame Street was conceived in 1966 during discussions between television producer Joan Ganz Cooney and Carnegie Foundation vice president Lloyd Morrisett. Their goal was to create a children's television show that would "master the addictive qualities of television and do something good with them," such as helping young children prepare for school. After two years of research, the newly formed Children's Television Workshop (CTW) received a combined grant of US$8 million ($70 million in 2025 dollars) from the Carnegie Foundation, the Ford Foundation, the Corporation for Public Broadcasting, and the U.S. federal government to create and produce a new children's television show.

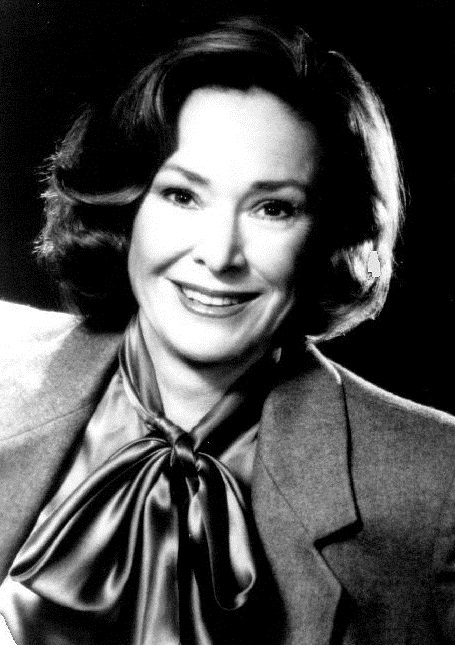
Co-creator Joan Ganz Cooney (pictured 1985)

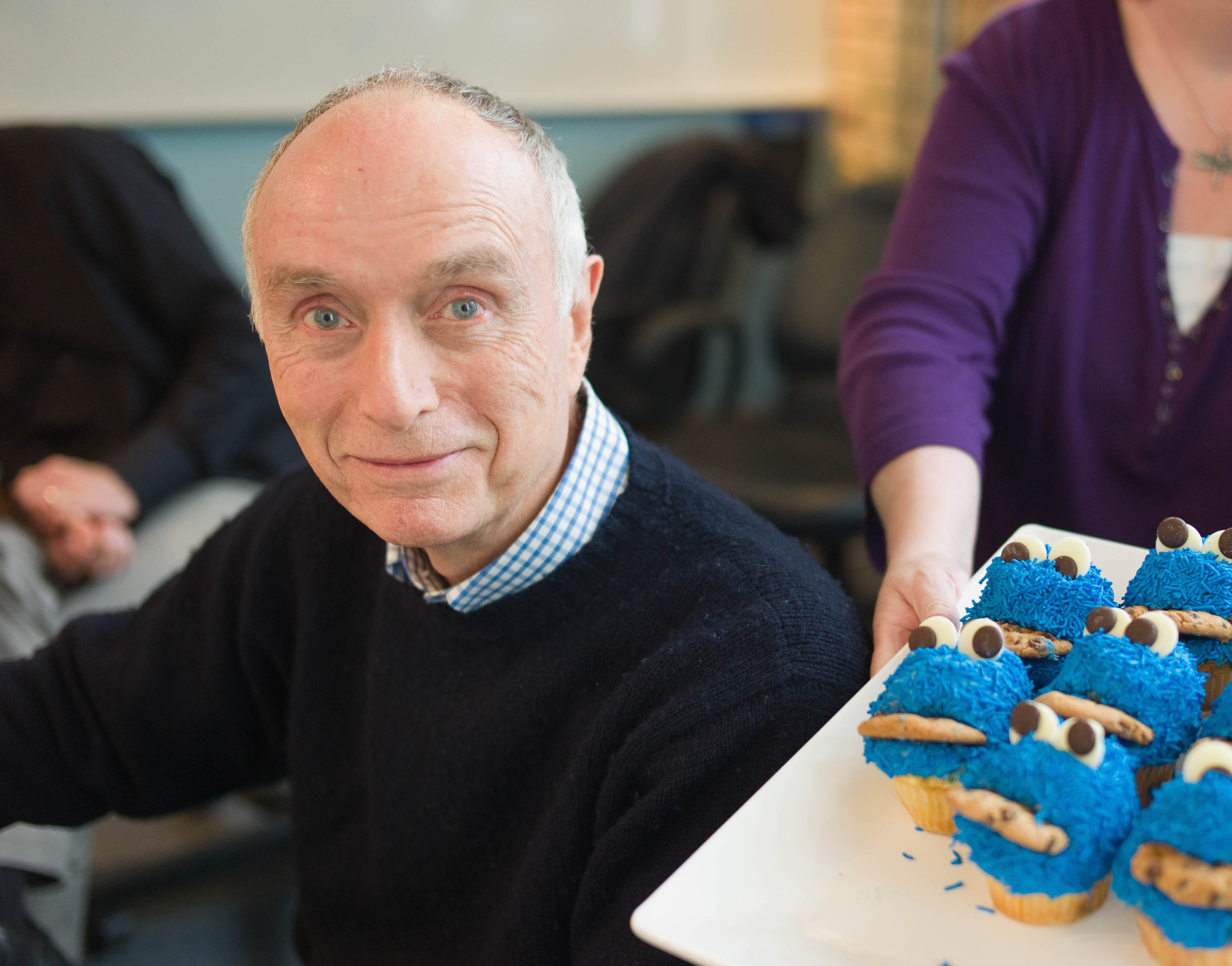
Lloyd Morrisett, co-creator (pictured 2010)

Sesame Street was officially announced at a press conference on May 6, 1969. Joan Ganz Cooney, Children's Television Workshop's executive director, said that Sesame Street would use the techniques of commercial television programs to teach young children. Live shorts and animated cartoons would teach young children the alphabet, numbers, vocabulary, shapes, and basic reasoning skills. By repeating concepts throughout an episode, young children's interest would be held while they learn the concepts. Guest cameos would help attract older children and adults. Cooney said that the name Sesame Street came from the saying "open sesame", which gives the idea of a place where exciting things occur. The show was given an initial six-month run to determine whether it was effective and would continue to air.

The program premiered on public television stations on November 10, 1969. It was the first preschool educational television program to base its contents and production values on laboratory and formative research. Initial responses to the show included adulatory reviews, some controversy, and high ratings.

I've always said of our original team that developed and produced Sesame Street: Collectively, we were a genius.

— Sesame Street creator Joan Ganz Cooney

According to writer Michael Davis, by the mid-1970s, the show had become "an American institution." The cast and crew expanded during this time, with emphasis on the hiring of women crew members and the addition of minorities to the cast. The show's success continued into the 1980s. In 1981, when the federal government withdrew its funding, CTW turned to and expanded other revenue sources, including its magazine division, book royalties, product licensing, and foreign broadcast income. Its curriculum has expanded to include more affective topics such as relationships, ethics, and emotions. Many of its storylines have been inspired by the experiences of its writing staff, cast, and crew—most notably, the 1982 death of Will Lee, who played Mr. Hooper; and the marriage of Luis and Maria in 1988.

By the end of the 1990s, the show faced societal and economic challenges, including changes in young children's viewing habits, competition from other shows, the development of cable television, and a drop in ratings. As the 21st century began, the show made major changes. Starting in 2002, its format became more narrative-focused and included ongoing storylines. After its 30th anniversary in 1999, due to the popularity of the Muppet Elmo, the show also incorporated a popular segment known as Elmo's World. In 2009, the show won the Outstanding Achievement Emmy for its then 40 years on the air.

In late 2015, in response to "sweeping changes in the media business" and as part of a five-year programming and development deal, premium television service HBO began airing first-run episodes of Sesame Street. The episodes became available on PBS stations and websites nine months after they aired on HBO. The deal allowed Sesame Workshop to produce more episodes—increasing from 18 to 35 per season—and to create a spinoff series with the Sesame Street Muppets, and a new educational series.

At its 50th anniversary in 2019, Sesame Street had produced over 4,500 episodes, two feature-length movies (Follow That Bird in 1985 and The Adventures of Elmo in Grouchland in 1999), 35 TV specials, 200 home videos, and 180 albums. Beginning that year, digitized versions of the show's full archive of episodes were donated to the American Archive of Public Broadcasting, viewable on site at the library's locations, with five episodes available for viewing online. Its YouTube channel has over 24 million subscribers. It was announced in October 2019 that first-run episodes will move to HBO Max beginning with the show's 51st season in 2020. In August 2022, HBO Max removed 200 older episodes of the series from its library after initially offering around 650 episodes. On December 13, 2024, it was announced that Max would not be renewing their contract to make episodes of Sesame Street, meaning 2025 would be the last year for episodes made with Max. Episodes will be in the HBO Max streaming library until 2027. A spokesperson for Sesame Workshop stated: "We will continue to invest in our best-in-class programming and look forward to announcing our new distribution plans in the coming months, ensuring that 'Sesame Street' reaches as many children as possible for generations to come."

On May 19, 2025, it was announced that Sesame Street would begin to air new episodes on Netflix worldwide and would once again premiere episodes on PBS, with new episodes being released on both platforms on the same day, as well as past seasons. This move would also include the acquisition of 90 hours of older episodes by Netflix. Season 56 of Sesame Street premiered on Netflix and PBS on November 10, 2025. Beginning in January 2026, under a new agreement, the official YouTube channel began to host the largest collection of older library episodes. The first 100 episodes of the series were uploaded to YouTube on January 15, 2026.

== Format ==
From its first episode, Sesame Street's format has utilized "a strong visual style, fast-moving action, humor, and music," as well as animation and live-action short films. When it premiered, most researchers believed that young children did not have long attention spans, and the show's producers were concerned that an hour-long show would not hold their attention. At first, its "street scenes"—the action recorded on its set—consisted of character-driven interactions. Rather than ongoing stories, they were written as individual, curriculum-based segments interrupted by "inserts" of puppet sketches, short films and animations. This structure allowed producers to use a mixture of styles and characters, and to vary its pace, presumably keeping it interesting to young viewers. However, by season 20, research showed that children were able to follow a story—and the street scenes, while still interspersed with other segments, became evolving storylines.

We basically deconstructed the show. It's not a magazine format anymore. It's more like the Sesame hour. Children will be able to navigate through it easier.

— Executive producer Arlene Sherman, speaking of the show's restructuring in 2002

On recommendations by child psychologists, the producers initially decided that the show's human actors and Muppets would not interact because they were concerned it would confuse young children. When CTW tested the new show, they found that children paid attention during the Muppet segments and that their interest was lost during the "Street" segments. They requested that Henson and his team create Muppets such as Big Bird and Oscar the Grouch to interact with the human actors, and the Street segments were re-shot.

Sesame Street's format remained intact until the 2000s when the changing audience required that producers move to a more narrative format. In 1998, Elmo's World, a 15-minute-long segment hosted by the Muppet Elmo, was created. Starting in 2014, during the show's 45th season, the producers introduced a half-hour version of the program. The new version, which originally complemented the full-hour series, was broadcast weekday afternoons and streamed on the Internet. In 2017, in response to the changing viewing habits of toddlers, the show's producers retired the full-hour version across all its broadcast platforms. The new half-hour version featured fewer characters, reduced pop culture references "once included as winks for their parents", and focused "on a single backbone topic."

In October 2023, The Hollywood Reporter announced that Sesame Street would be reimagined by completely dropping the half-hour magazine-style format of the show in favor of a longer narrative-driven style and more live action Muppet characters. The new format took effect in Season 56, which premiered on November 10, 2025, alongside a new animated series, Tales from 123.

== Educational goals ==
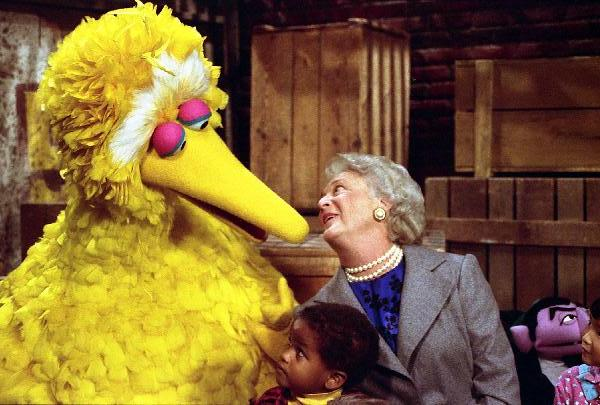
First Lady Barbara Bush participates with Big Bird in an educational taping of Sesame Street at United Studios, 1989

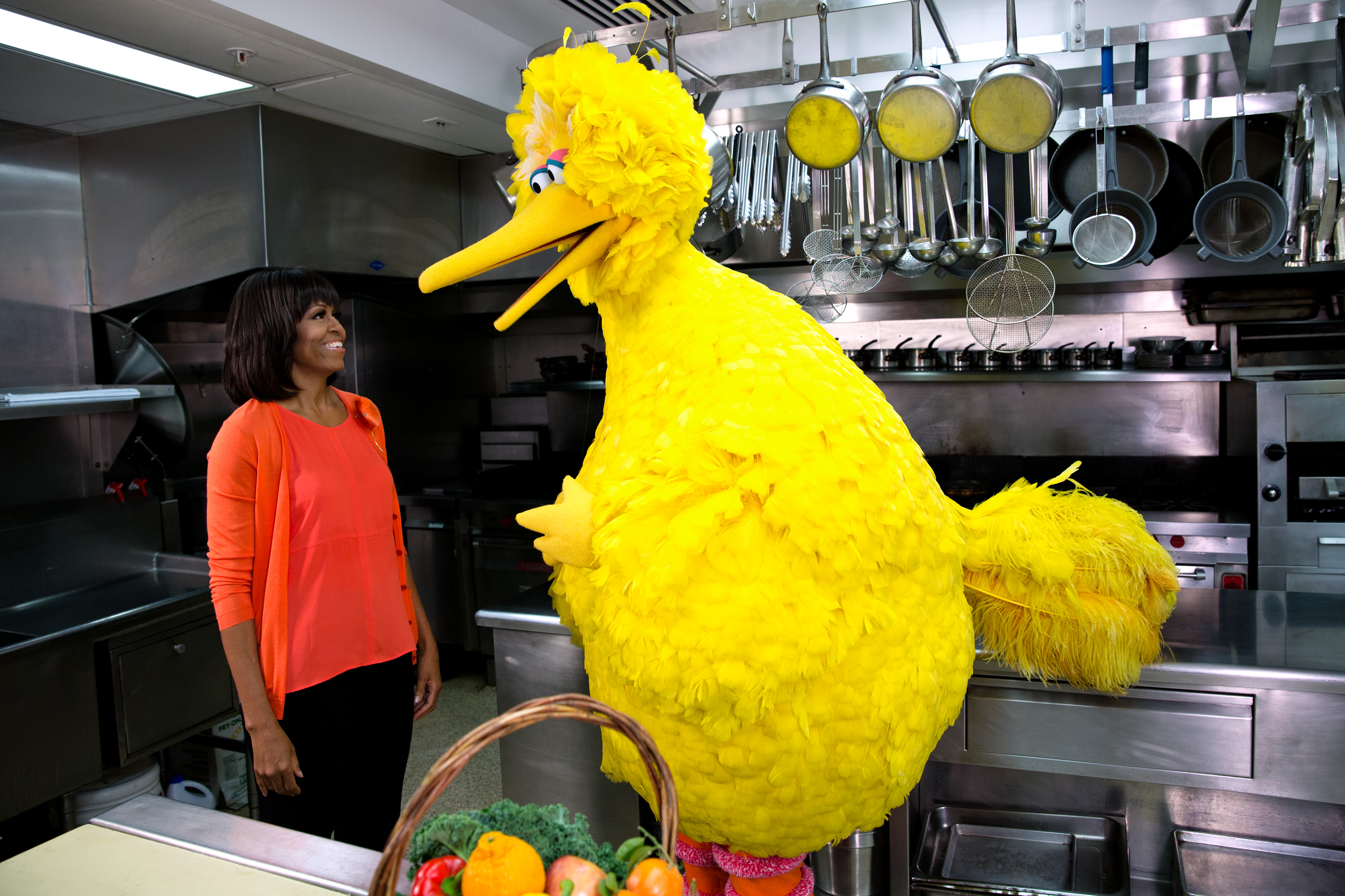
First Lady Michelle Obama participates in a Let's Move! and Sesame Street public service announcement taping with Big Bird in the White House Kitchen, 2013

Canadian author Malcolm Gladwell has said that "Sesame Street was built around a single, breakthrough insight: that if you can hold the attention of children, you can educate them." Gerald S. Lesser, the CTW's first advisory board chair, went even further, saying that the effective use of television as an educational tool needed to capture, focus, and sustain children's attention. Sesame Street was the first children's show to structure each episode, and the segments within them, to capture children's attention, and to make, as Gladwell put it, "small but critical adjustments" to keep it. According to CTW researchers Rosemarie Truglio and Shalom Fisch, it was one of the few children's shows to utilize a detailed and comprehensive educational curriculum, garnered from formative and summative research.

Sesame Street's creators and researchers formulated both cognitive and affective goals for the show. They initially focused on cognitive goals, while addressing affective goals indirectly, believing it would increase children's self-esteem and feelings of competency. One of their primary goals was preparing young children for school, especially children from low-income families, using modeling, repetition, and humor. They adjusted its content to increase viewers' attention and the show's appeal, and encouraged older children and parents to "co-view" it by including more sophisticated humor, cultural references, and celebrity guests; by 2019, 80% of parents watched Sesame Street with their children, and 650 celebrities had appeared on the show.

During Sesame Street's first season, some critics felt that it should address more overtly such affective goals as social competence, tolerance of diversity, and nonaggressive ways of resolving conflict. The show's creators and producers responded by featuring these themes in interpersonal disputes between its Street characters. During the 1980s, the show incorporated real-life experiences of its cast and crew, including the death of Will Lee (Mr. Hooper) and the pregnancy of Sonia Manzano (Maria). In later seasons, it addressed real-life disasters such as the September 11 terrorist attacks and Hurricane Katrina.

In its first season, the show addressed its outreach goals by focusing on the promotion of educational materials used in preschool settings; and in subsequent seasons, by focusing on their development. Innovative programs were developed because their target audience, children and their families in low-income, inner-city homes, did not traditionally watch educational programs on television and because traditional methods of promotion and advertising were not effective with these groups.

Starting in 2006, Sesame Workshop expanded its outreach by creating a series of PBS specials and DVDs focusing on how military deployment affects the families of servicepeople. Its outreach efforts also focused on families of prisoners, health and wellness, and safety. In 2013, SW started Sesame Street in Communities, to help families dealing with difficult issues.

== Funding ==
As a result of Cooney's initial proposal in 1968, the Carnegie Institute awarded her a $1 million grant to create a new children's television program and establish the CTW, renamed in June 2000 to Sesame Workshop (SW). Cooney and Morrisett procured additional multimillion-dollar grants from the U.S. federal government, The Arthur Vining Davis Foundations, CPB, and the Ford Foundation. Davis reported that Cooney and Morrisett decided that if they did not procure full funding from the beginning, they would drop the idea of producing the show. As Lesser reported, funds gained from a combination of government agencies and private foundations protected them from the economic pressures experienced by commercial broadcast television networks, but created challenges in procuring future funding.

After Sesame Street's initial success, its producers began to think about its survival beyond its development and first season and decided to explore other funding sources. From the first season, they understood that the source of their funding, which they considered "seed" money, would need to be replaced. The 1970s were marked by conflicts between the CTW and the federal government; in 1978, the U.S. Department of Education refused to deliver a $2 million check (equivalent to $9.87 million in 2025) until the last day of CTW's fiscal year. As a result, the CTW decided to depend upon licensing arrangements with toy companies and other manufacturers, publishing, and international sales for their funding.

In 1998, the CTW accepted corporate sponsorship to raise funds for Sesame Street and other projects. For the first time, they allowed short advertisements by indoor playground manufacturer Discovery Zone, their first corporate sponsor, to air before and after each episode. Consumer advocate Ralph Nader, who had previously appeared on Sesame Street, called for a boycott of the show, saying that the CTW was "exploiting impressionable children." In 2015, in response to funding challenges, it was announced that premium television service HBO would air first-run episodes of Sesame Street. Steve Youngwood, SW's Chief Operating Officer, called the move "one of the toughest decisions we ever made." According to The New York Times, the move "drew an immediate backlash." Critics claimed that it favored privileged children over less-advantaged children and their families, the original focus of the show. They also criticized choosing to air first-run episodes on HBO, a network with adult dramas and comedies.

== Production ==
=== Research ===
Producer Joan Ganz Cooney has stated, "Without research, there would be no Sesame Street." In 1967, when she and her team began planning the show's development, combining research with television production was, as she put it, "positively heretical." Its producers soon began developing what came to be called the CTW Model, a system of planning, production and evaluation that did not fully emerge until the end of the show's first season. (Note: See Gikow, p. 155, for a visual representation of the CTW model.) According to Morrow, the Model consisted of four parts: "the interaction of receptive television producers and child science experts, the creation of a specific and age-appropriate curriculum, research to shape the program directly, and independent measurement of viewers' learning."

Cooney credited the show's high standard in research procedures to Harvard professors Gerald S. Lesser, whom CTW hired to design its educational objectives; and Edward L. Palmer, who conducted the show's formative research and bridged the gap between producers and researchers. CTW conducted research in two ways: in-house formative research that informed and improved production; and independent summative evaluations, conducted by the Educational Testing Service (ETS) during the first two seasons, which measured its educational effectiveness. Cooney said, "From the beginning, we—the planners of the project—designed the show as an experimental research project with educational advisers, researchers, and television producers collaborating as equal partners." She characterized the collaboration as an "arranged marriage."

=== Writing ===
Sesame Street has used many writers in its long history. As Peter Hellman wrote in his 1987 article in New York Magazine, "The show, of course, depends upon its writers, and it isn't easy to find adults who could identify the interest level of a pre-schooler." Fifteen writers a year worked on the show's scripts, but very few lasted longer than one season. Norman Stiles, head writer in 1987, reported that most writers would "burn out" after writing about a dozen scripts. According to Gikow, Sesame Street went against the convention of hiring teachers to write for the show, as most educational television programs did at the time. Instead, Cooney and the producers felt that it would be easier to teach writers how to interpret curriculum than to teach educators how to write comedy. As Stone stated, "Writing for children is not so easy." Long-time writer Tony Geiss agreed, stating in 2009, "It's not an easy show to write. You have to know the characters and the format and how to teach and be funny at the same time, which is a big, ambidextrous stunt."

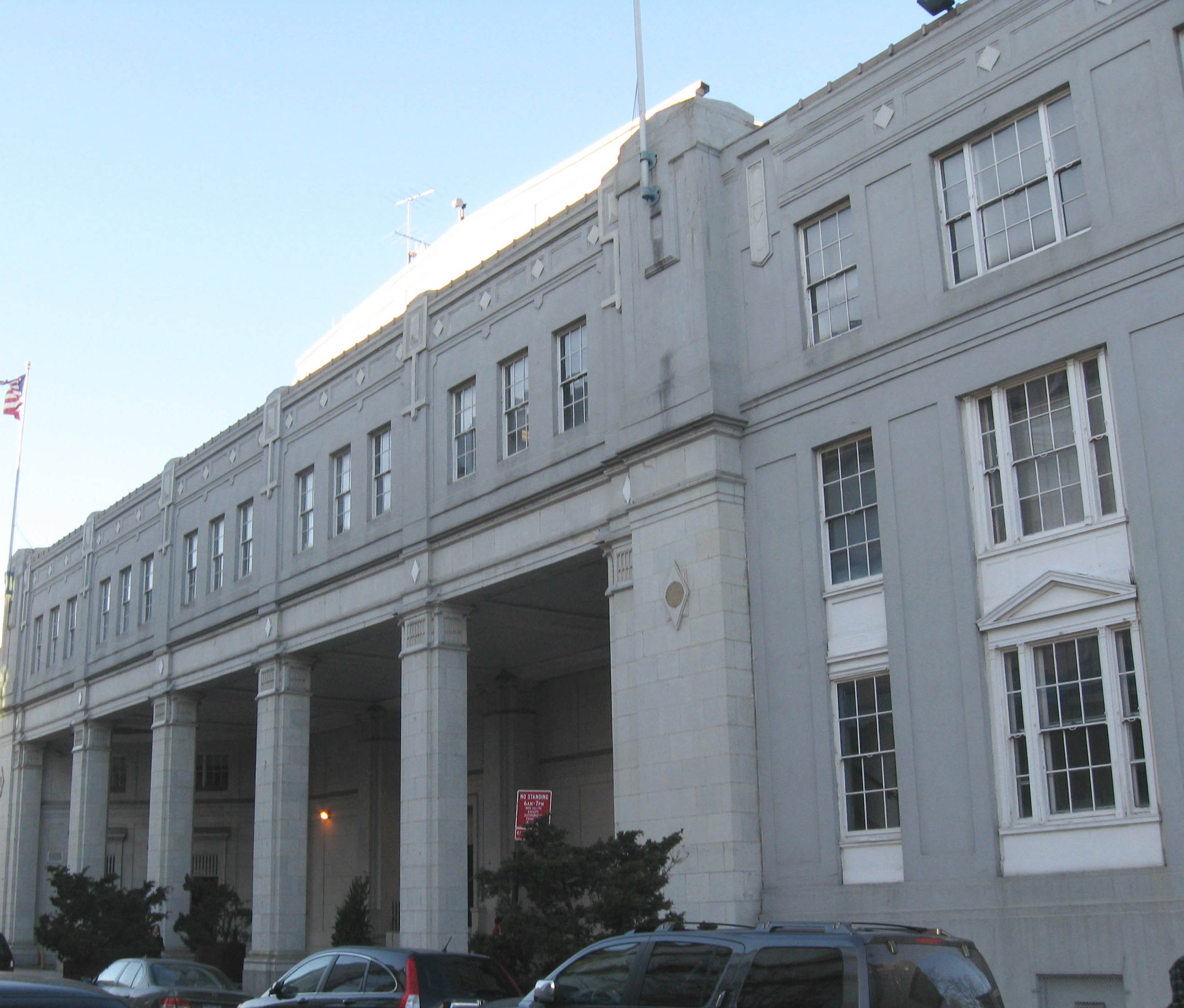
The Kaufman Astoria Studios, where Sesame Street is taped

The show's research team developed an annotated document, or "Writer's Notebook," which served as a bridge between the show's curriculum goals and script development. The notebook was a compilation of programming ideas designed to teach specific curriculum points, provided extended definitions of curriculum goals, and assisted the writers and producers in translating the goals into televised material. Suggestions in the notebook were free of references to specific characters and contexts on the show so that they could be implemented as openly and flexibly as possible.

The research team, in a series of meetings with the writers, also developed "a curriculum sheet" that described the show's goals and priorities for every season. After receiving the curriculum focus and goals for the season, the writers met to discuss ideas and story arcs for the characters, and an "assignment sheet" was created that suggested how much time was allotted for each goal and topic. When a script was completed, the show's research team analyzed it to ensure that the goals were met. Then each production department met to determine what each episode needed in terms of costumes, lights, and sets. The writers were present during the show's taping, which for the first twenty-four years of the show took place in Manhattan, and after 1992, at the Kaufman Astoria Studios in Queens to make last-minute revisions when necessary. (Note: Most of the first season was filmed at a studio near Broadway, but a strike forced their move to Teletape Studios. In the early days, the set was simple, consisting of four structures. In 1982, Sesame Street began filming at Unitel Studios on 57th Street, but relocated to Kaufman Astoria Studios in 1993, when the producers decided they needed more space.)

=== Media ===
Early in their history Sesame Street and the CTW began to look for alternative funding sources and turned to creating products and writing licensing agreements. They became, as Cooney put it, "a multiple-media institution." In 1970, the CTW created a "non-broadcast" division responsible for creating and publishing books and Sesame Street Magazine. By 2019, the Sesame Workshop had published over 6,500 book titles. The Workshop decided from the start that all materials their licensing program created would "underscore and amplify" the show's curriculum. In 2004, over 68% of Sesame Street's revenue came from licenses and products such as toys and clothing. (Note: See Gikow, pp. 280–285 for a list of many of the show's products.) By 2008, the Sesame Street Muppets accounted for between $15 million and $17 million per year in licensing and merchandising fees, split between the Sesame Workshop and The Jim Henson Company. By 2019, the Sesame Workshop had over 500 licensing agreements and had produced over 200 hours of home video. There have been two theatrically released Sesame Street movies, Follow That Bird, released in 1985, and The Adventures of Elmo in Grouchland, released in 1999. In early 2019, it was announced that a third Sesame Street feature film, a musical co-starring Anne Hathaway and written and directed by Jonathan Krisel, would be produced. In November 2019, Sesame Street announced a family friendly augmented reality application produced by Weyo in partnership with Sesame Workshop in honor of the show's 50th anniversary.

Jim Henson, the creator of the Muppets, owned the trademarks to those characters, and was reluctant to market them at first. He agreed when the CTW promised that the profits from toys, books, computer games, and other products were to be used exclusively to fund the CTW and its outreach efforts. Even though Cooney and the CTW had very little experience with marketing, they demanded complete control over all products and product decisions. Any product line associated with the show had to be educational and inexpensive, and could not be advertised during the show's airings. As Davis reported, "Cooney stressed restraint, prudence, and caution" in their marketing and licensing efforts. (Note: According to Parade Magazine in 2019, 1 million children played with Sesame Street toys daily.)

Director Jon Stone, talking about the music of Sesame Street, said: "There was no other sound like it on television." For the first time in children's television, the show's songs fulfilled a specific purpose and supported its curriculum. In order to attract the best composers and lyricists, the CTW allowed songwriters like Joe Raposo, Sesame Street's first musical director, to retain the rights to the songs they wrote, which earned them lucrative profits and helped the show sustain public interest. By 2019, there were 180 albums of Sesame Street music produced, and its songwriters had received 11 Grammys. In late 2018, the SW announced a multi-year agreement with Warner Music Group to re-launch Sesame Street Records in the U.S. and Canada. For the first time in 20 years, "an extensive catalog of Sesame Street recordings" was made available to the public in a variety of formats, including CD and vinyl compilations, digital streaming, and downloads.

Sesame Street used animations and short films commissioned from outside studios, interspersed throughout each episode, to help teach their viewers basic concepts like numbers and letters. Jim Henson was one of the many producers to create short films for the show. Shortly after Sesame Street debuted in the United States, the CTW was approached independently by producers from several countries to produce versions of the show at home. These versions were known as "co-productions." By 2001 there were over 120 million viewers of all international versions of Sesame Street, and in 2006, there were twenty co-productions around the world. By its 50th anniversary in 2019, 190 million children viewed over 160 versions of Sesame Street in 70 languages. In 2005, Doreen Carvajal of The New York Times reported that income from the co-productions and international licensing accounted for $96 million. Sesame Street the Musical opened at Theatre Row off Broadway on September 8, 2022.

In 2015, HBO acquired the production rights to the show, which included an agreement of exclusive rights for nine months at which point the episodes were to be given away free of charge to other networks (e.g. PBS). In December 2024, HBO announced it would part ways with Sesame Street.

== Cast, crew and characters ==
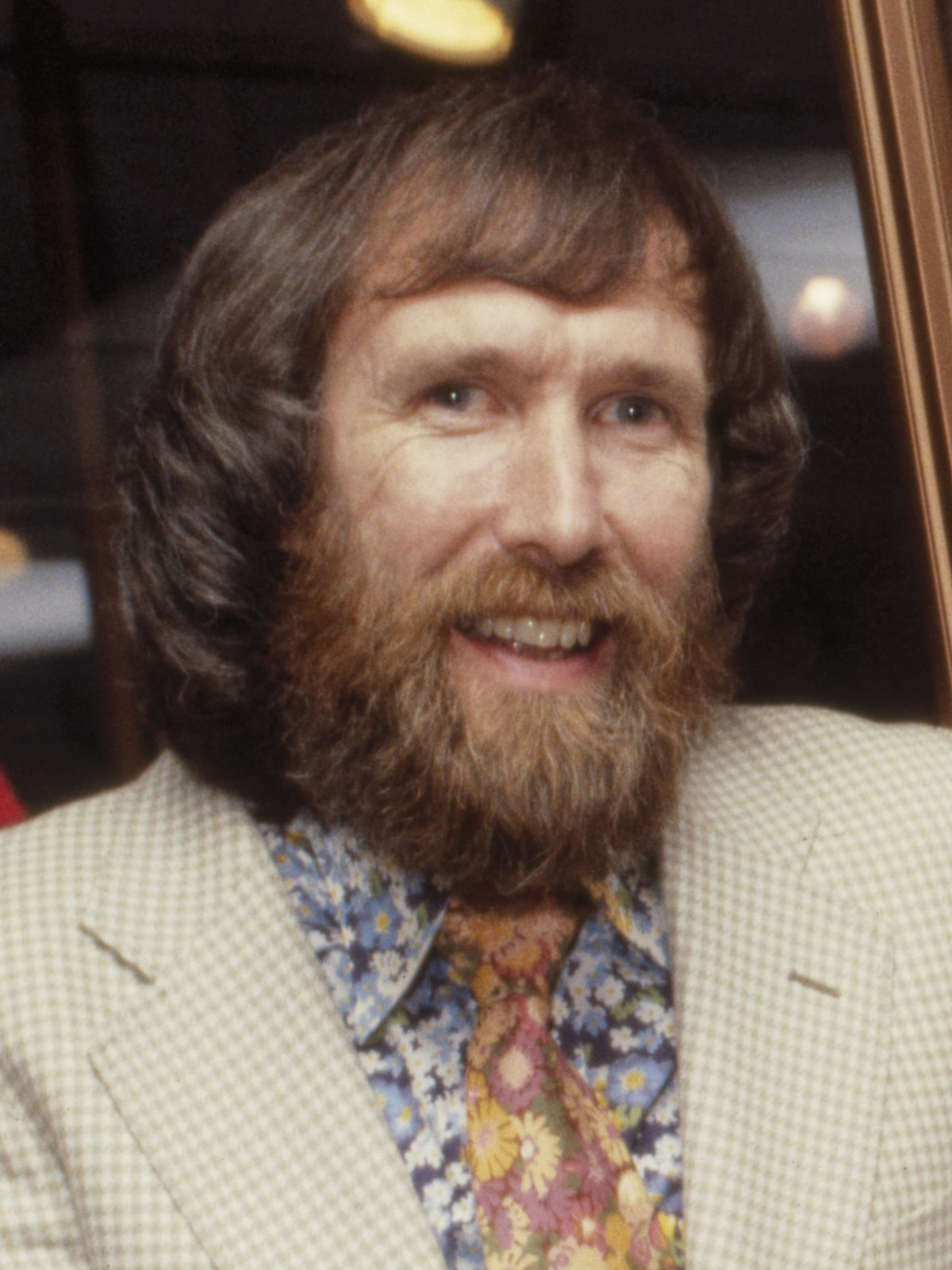
Jim Henson, the creator of the Muppets, in 1979

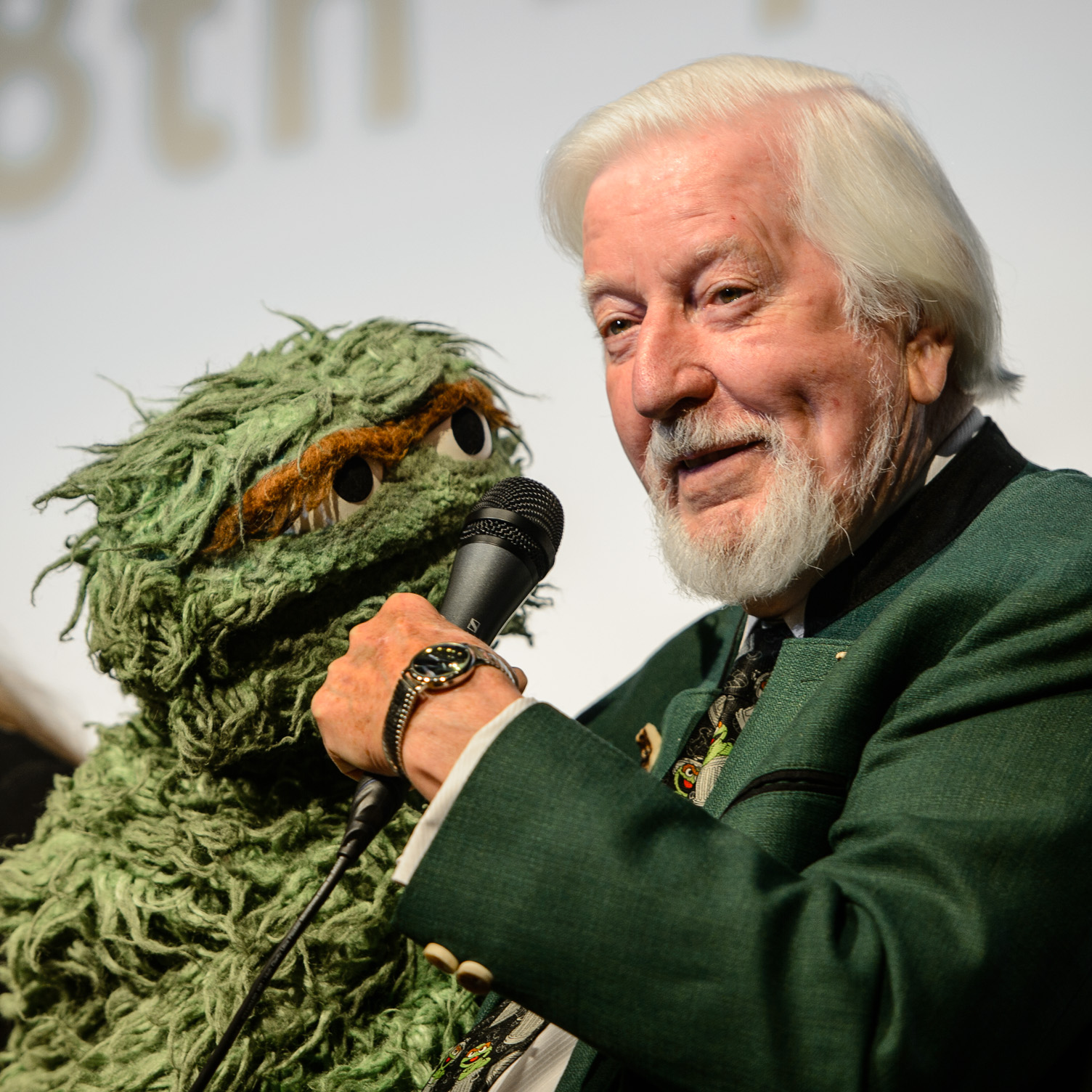
Caroll Spinney with Oscar the Grouch

Shortly after the CTW was created in 1968, Joan Ganz Cooney was named its first executive director. She was one of the first female executives in American television. Her appointment was called "one of the most important television developments of the decade." She assembled a team of producers, all of whom had previously worked on Captain Kangaroo. Jon Stone was responsible for writing, casting, and format; Dave Connell took over animation; and Sam Gibbon served as the show's chief liaison between the production staff and the research team.

Jim Henson and the Muppets' involvement in Sesame Street began when he and Cooney met at one of the curriculum planning seminars in Boston. Author Christopher Finch reported that Stone, who had worked with Henson previously, felt that if they could not bring him on board, they should "make do without puppets." Henson was initially reluctant, but he agreed to join Sesame Street to meet his own social goals. He also agreed to waive his performance fee for full ownership of the Sesame Street Muppets and to split any revenue they generated with the CTW. As Morrow stated, Henson's puppets were a crucial part of the show's popularity and it brought Henson national attention. Davis reported that Henson was able to take "arcane academic goals" and translate them to "effective and pleasurable viewing." In early research, the Muppet segments of the show scored high, and more Muppets were added during the first few seasons. Morrow reported that the Muppets were effective teaching tools because children easily recognized them, they were stereotypical and predictable, and they appealed to adults and older siblings.

Sesame Street is best known for the creative geniuses it attracted, people like Jim Henson and Joe Raposo and Frank Oz, who intuitively grasped what it takes to get through to children. They were television's answer to Beatrix Potter or L. Frank Baum or Dr. Seuss.

— Author Malcolm Gladwell, The Tipping Point

Although the producers decided against depending upon a single host for Sesame Street, instead casting a group of ethnically diverse actors, they realized that a children's television program needed to have, as Lesser put it, "a variety of distinctive and reliable personalities," both human and Muppet. Jon Stone, whose goal was to cast white actors in the minority, was responsible for hiring the show's first cast. He did not audition actors until Spring 1969, a few weeks before the five test shows were due to be filmed. Stone videotaped the auditions, and Ed Palmer took them out into the field to test children's reactions. The actors who received the "most enthusiastic thumbs up" were cast. For example, Loretta Long was chosen to play Susan when the children who saw her audition stood up and sang along with her rendition of "I'm a Little Teapot." Stone stated that casting was the only aspect of the show that was "just completely haphazard." Most of the cast and crew found jobs on Sesame Street through personal relationships with Stone and the other producers. According to puppeteer Marty Robinson in 2019, longevity was common among the show's cast and crew.

According to the CTW's research, children preferred watching and listening to other children more than to puppets and adults; as such, they included children in many scenes. Dave Connell insisted that no child actors be used, so these children were non-professionals, unscripted, and spontaneous. Many of their reactions were unpredictable and difficult to control. However, the adult cast learned to handle the children's spontaneity flexibly, even when it resulted in departures from the planned script or lesson. CTW research also revealed that the children's hesitations and on-air mistakes served as models for viewers. According to Morrow, this resulted in the show having a "fresh quality," especially in its early years.

== Reception ==
=== Ratings ===
When Sesame Street premiered on November 10, 1969, it aired on only 67.6% of American televisions, but it earned a 3.3 Nielsen rating, which totaled 1.9 million households. By the show's tenth anniversary in 1979, nine million American children under the age of 6 were watching Sesame Street daily. According to a 1993 survey conducted by the U.S. Department of Education, out of the show's 6.6 million viewers, 2.4 million kindergartners regularly watched it. 77% of preschoolers watched it once a week, and 86% of kindergartners and students in first and second grade had watched it once a week before starting school. The show reached most young children in almost all demographic groups.

The show's ratings significantly decreased in the early 1990s, due to changes in children's viewing habits and in the television marketplace. The producers responded by making large-scale structural changes to the show. By 2006, Sesame Street had become "the most widely viewed children's television show in the world," with 20 international independent versions and broadcasts in over 120 countries. A 1996 survey found that 95% of all American preschoolers had watched the show by the time they were three years old. In 2008, it was estimated that 77 million Americans had watched the series as children. By the show's 40th anniversary in 2009, it was ranked the fifteenth-most-popular children's show on television, and by its 50th in 2019, the show had 100% brand awareness globally. In 2018, the show was the second-highest-rated program on PBS Kids. In 2021, however, the Sesame Street documentary "50 Years of Sunny Days," which was broadcast nationally on ABC, did not fare well in the ratings, scoring only approximately 2.3 million viewers.

=== Influence ===
As of 2001, there were over 1,000 research studies regarding Sesame Street's efficacy, impact, and effect on American culture. The CTW solicited the Educational Testing Service (ETS) to conduct summative research on the show. ETS's two "landmark" summative evaluations, conducted in 1970 and 1971, demonstrated that the show had a significant educational impact on its viewers. These studies have been cited in other studies of the effects of television on young children. (Note: According to Edward Palmer and his colleague Shalom M. Fisch, these studies were responsible for securing funding for the show over the next several years.) Additional studies conducted throughout Sesame Street's history demonstrated that the show continued to have a positive effect on its young viewers. (Note: See Gikow, pp. 284–285; "G" Is for Growing: Thirty Years of Research on Children and Sesame Street, pp. 147–230.)

Sesame Street [is] perhaps the most vigorously researched, vetted, and fretted-over program on the planet. It would take a fork-lift to now to haul away the load of scholarly paper devoted to the series...

— Author Michael Davis

Lesser believed that Sesame Street research "may have conferred a new respectability upon the studies of the effects of visual media upon children." He also believed that the show had the same effect on the prestige of producing shows for children in the television industry. Historian Robert Morrow, in his book Sesame Street and the Reform of Children's Television, which chronicled the show's influence on children's television and on the television industry as a whole, reported that many critics of commercial television saw Sesame Street as a "straightforward illustration for reform." Les Brown, a writer for Variety, saw in Sesame Street "a hope for a more substantial future" for television.

Morrow reported that the networks responded by creating more high-quality television programs, but that many critics saw them as "appeasement gestures." According to Morrow, despite the CTW Model's effectiveness in creating a popular show, commercial television "made only a limited effort to emulate CTW's methods," and did not use a curriculum or evaluate what children learned from them. By the mid-1970s commercial television had abandoned their experiments with creating better children's programming. Other critics hoped that Sesame Street, with its depiction of a functioning, multicultural community, would nurture racial tolerance in its young viewers. It was not until the mid-1990s that another children's television educational program, Blue's Clues, used the CTW's methods to create and modify their content. The creators of Blue's Clues were influenced by Sesame Street, but wanted to use research conducted in the 30 years since its debut. Angela Santomero, one of its producers, said, "We wanted to learn from Sesame Street and take it one step further."

Critic Richard Roeper said that perhaps one of the strongest indicators of the influence of Sesame Street has been the enduring rumors and urban legends surrounding the show and its characters, especially speculation concerning the sexuality of Bert and Ernie.

=== Critical reception ===
Sesame Street was praised from its debut in 1969. Newsday reported that several newspapers and magazines had written "glowing" reports about the CTW and Cooney. The press overwhelmingly praised the new show; several popular magazines and niche magazines lauded it. In 1970, Sesame Street won twenty awards, including a Peabody Award, three Emmys, an award from the Public Relations Society of America, a Clio, and a Prix Jeunesse. By 1995, the show had won two Peabody Awards and four Parents' Choice Awards. It was the subject of a traveling exhibition by the Smithsonian Institution, and a film exhibition at the Museum of Modern Art.

Sesame Street is ... with lapses, the most intelligent and important program in television. That is not anything much yet.

— Renata Adler, The New Yorker, 1972

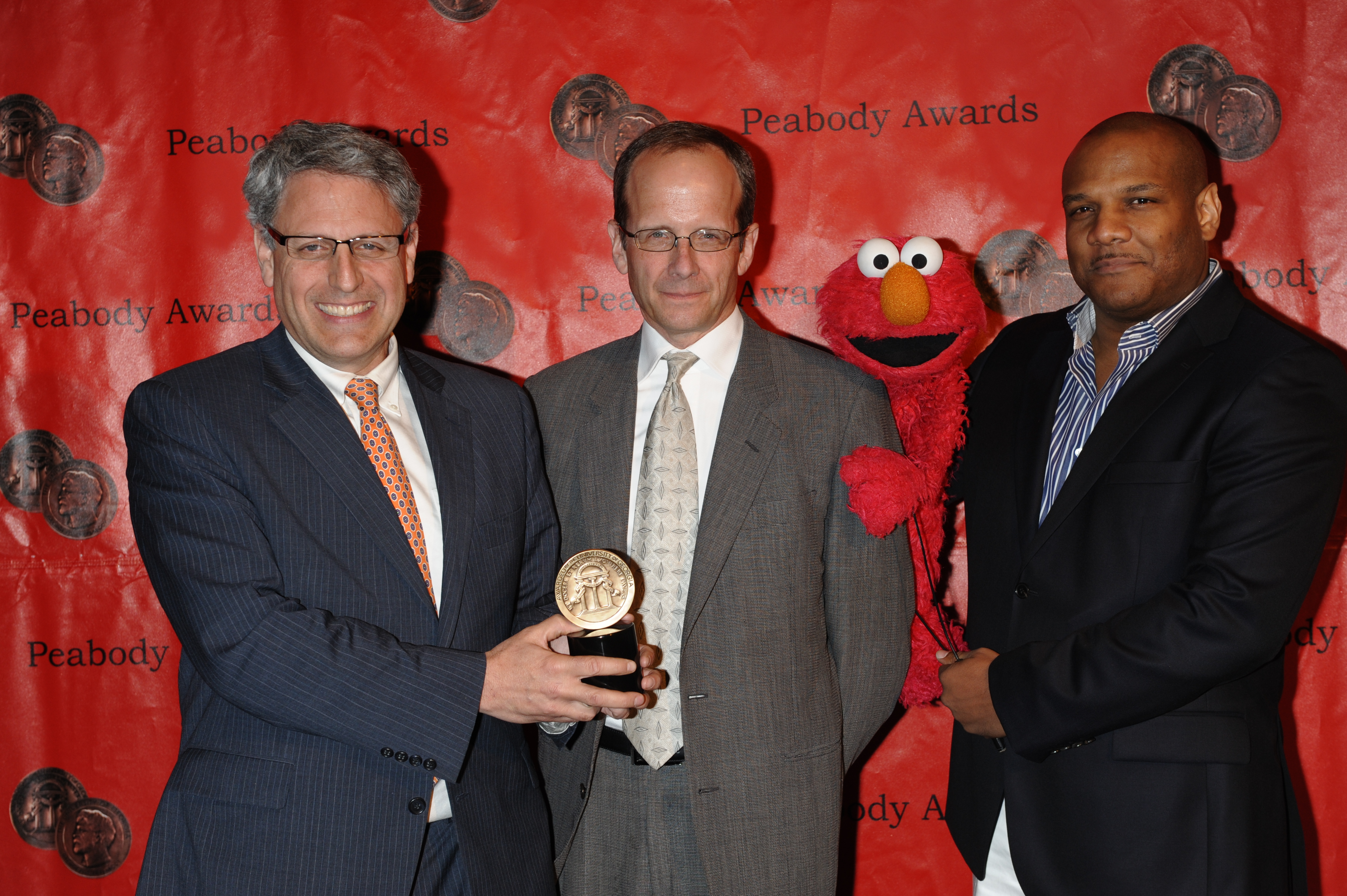
Sesame Workshop CEO Gary Knell, Executive Vice-president Terry Fitzpatrick, and puppeteer Kevin Clash (with Elmo) at the 69th Annual Peabody Awards in 2010

Sesame Street was not without its detractors, however. The state commission in Mississippi, where Henson was from, operated the state's PBS member station; in May 1970 it voted to not air Sesame Street because of its "highly [racially] integrated cast of children" which "the commission members felt ... Mississippi was not yet ready for." According to Children and Television, Lesser's account of the development and early years of Sesame Street, there was little criticism of the show in the months following its premiere, but it increased at the end of its first season and beginning of the second season. (Note: See Lesser, pp. 175–201 for his response to the early critics of Sesame Street.) Historian Robert W. Morrow speculated that much of the early criticism, which he called "surprisingly intense," stemmed from cultural and historical reasons in regards to, as he put it, "the place of children in American society and the controversies about television's effects on them."

According to Morrow, the "most important" studies finding negative effects of Sesame Street were conducted by educator Herbert A. Sprigle and psychologist Thomas D. Cook during its first two seasons. Social scientist and Head Start founder Urie Bronfenbrenner criticized the show for being too wholesome. Psychologist Leon Eisenberg saw Sesame Street's urban setting as "superficial" and having little to do with the problems confronted by the inner-city child. Head Start director Edward Zigler was probably Sesame Street's most vocal critic in the show's early years.

In spite of their commitment to multiculturalism, the CTW experienced conflicts with the leadership of minority groups, especially Latino groups and feminists, who objected to Sesame Street's depiction of Latinos and women. The CTW took steps to address their objections. By 1971, the CTW hired Hispanic actors, production staff, and researchers, and by the mid-1970s, Morrow reported that "the show included Chicano and Puerto Rican cast members, films about Mexican holidays and foods, and cartoons that taught Spanish words." As The New York Times has stated, creating strong female characters "that make kids laugh, but not...as female stereotypes" has been a challenge for the producers of Sesame Street. According to Morrow, change regarding how women and girls were depicted on Sesame Street occurred slowly. As more female Muppet performers like Camille Bonora, Fran Brill, Pam Arciero, Carmen Osbahr, Stephanie D'Abruzzo, Jennifer Barnhart, and Leslie Carrara-Rudolph were hired and trained, stronger female characters like Rosita (1991) and Abby Cadabby (2006) were created.

In 2002, Sesame Street was ranked number 27 on TV Guide's 50 Greatest TV Shows of All Time. Sesame Workshop won a Peabody Award in 2009 for its website, sesamestreet.org, and the show was given Peabody's Institutional Award in 2019 for 50 years of educating and entertaining children globally. In 2013, TV Guide ranked the show number 30 on its list of the 60 best TV series. As of 2021, Sesame Street has received 205 Emmy Awards, more than any other television series. In 2023, Variety ranked Sesame Street #12 on its list of the 100 greatest TV shows of all time.

== See also ==
- List of accolades received by Sesame Street
- List of human Sesame Street characters
- List of songs from Sesame Street
- Sesame Street (comic strip)
- Sesame Street international co-productions
- Sesame Street: The Musical
- The Not-Too-Late Show with Elmo
- Julia (Sesame Street)
- Mecha Builders
- When You Wish Upon a Pickle: A Sesame Street Special
