= List of television programs in which one character was played by multiple actors =

This is a list of television programs in which one character was played by multiple actors. In numerous television programs, producers have cast multiple actors for the part of the same character. This list does not include different actors briefly playing the same character at significantly different ages, but it does include actors playing the character continuously as the character ages. Actors are listed in chronological order, where possible. This list does not cover soap operas.

== # ==
- The 4400 (2004).
  - Character: Lily Tyler. Actresses: Laura Allen, Tippi Hedren.

== A ==
- The A-Team (1983–1987).
  - Character: Lt. Templeton "Faceman" Peck. Actors: Tim Dunigan (in the pilot), Dirk Benedict.
- Adventures of Superman (1950s, start and end air dates disputed).
  - Character: Lois Lane. Actresses: Phyllis Coates, Noel Neill.
- The Adventures of William Tell (1958–1959).
  - Character: Gessler's second in command, Frederick. Actors: Derren Nesbitt (first six episodes), Willoughby Gray (seventh episode), Jack Watling.
- Alice (1976–1985).
  - Character: Tommy Hyatt. Actors: Alfred Lutter (pilot – carry-over from original movie Alice Doesn't Live Here Anymore), Philip McKeon (rest of series).
- All American (2018).
  - Character: JP Keating. Actors: Elvis Nolasco (2018–2020), Ray Campbell (2021–).
- All in the Family (1971–1979).
  - Character: Gloria Bunker. Actresses: Kelly Jean Peters (first pilot), Candice Azzara (second pilot), Sally Struthers.
  - Character: Lionel Jefferson. Actors: D'Urville Martin (pilots), Mike Evans.
- 'Allo 'Allo! (1982–1992).
  - Character: Captain Alberto Bertorelli. Actors: Gavin Richards (1987–1989), Roger Kitter (1991).
  - Character: Monsieur Ernest LeClerc. Actors: Derek Royle (1989), Robin Parkinson (1991–1992, 2007).
  - Character: Herr Otto Flick. Actors: Richard Gibson (1984–1992), David Janson (1992).
- Altered Carbon.
  - Character: Takeshi Kovacs. Actors: Byron Mann (2134, Mercenary), Morgan Gao (Child Birth Sleeve), Will Yun Lee (2130, Birth Sleeve), Joel Kinnaman (2384, Elias Ryker sleeve), Jihae Kim (2414, Lounge Singer), Anthony Mackie (2414, combat sleeve).
  - Character: Reileen Kawahara. Actors: Dichen Lachman (Birth Sleeve and several cloned sleeves), Riley Lai Nelet (Child), Arnold Pinnock (2384, As Hemingway), Anna Von Hooft (2384, As Clarissa Severin), Maddie Dixon-Poirier (2384, As Little Girl), Martha Higareda (While impersonating Kristin Ortega).
- A Murder at the End of the World (2023).
  - Character: Darby Hart. Actors: Anastasia Lee (young), Emma Corrin.
- American Housewife (2016–2021).
  - Character: Anna-Kat Otto. Actresses: Julia Butters, Giselle Eisenberg.
  - Character: Taylor Otto. Actresses: Johnny Sequoyah (pilot only), Meg Donnelly.
- Another Period.
  - Character: Hortence Bellacort. Actresses: Artemis Pebdani (pilot), Lauren Ash (first season), Lauren Flans (second season), Donna Lynne Champlin (third season).
- Arrested Development.
  - Character: Ann Veal. Actresses: Alessandra Torresani (1 episode), Mae Whitman.
- Arrow (2012–2020).
  - Character: Sara Lance. Actresses: Jacqueline MacInnes Wood (pilot), Caity Lotz (seasons 2–8).
- A Thousand Blows (2025)
  - Character: Hezekiah Moscow. Actors: Jay Ellis (young), Malachi Kirby.

== B ==
- Babylon 5 (1994–1998).
  - Character: Anna Sheridan. Actresses: Beth Toussaint, Melissa Gilbert.
  - Character: Na'Toth. Actresses: Caitlin Brown, Mary Kay Adams.
- Back to You (2007–2008).
  - Character: Gracie Carr. Actresses: Laura Marano, Lily Jackson.
- Barbary Coast (1975).
  - Character: Cash Conover. Actors: Doug McClure, Dennis Cole (Pilot only).
- Batman (1966–1968).
  - Character: Catwoman. Actresses: Julie Newmar, Lee Meriwether (1966 film only), Eartha Kitt.
  - Character: Riddler. Actors: Frank Gorshin and John Astin.
  - Character: Mr. Freeze. Actors: George Sanders, Otto Preminger, Eli Wallach.
- Batwoman (2019).
  - Character: Kate Kane. Actresses: Ruby Rose, Wallis Day.
- Being Human.
  - Character: John Mitchell. Actors: Aidan Turner, Guy Flanagan (Pilot only).
  - Character: Annie Sawyer. Actresses: Lenora Crichlow, Andrea Riseborough (Pilot only).
  - Character: William Herrick. Actors: Jason Watkins, Adrian Lester (Pilot only).
  - Character: Lauren Drake. Actresses: Annabel Scholey, Dominique McElligott (Pilot only).
- Bette.
  - Character: Roy. Actors: Kevin Dunn and Robert Hays.
  - Character: Rose. Actresses: Lindsay Lohan, Marina Malota.
- Better Call Saul (2015–2022).
  - Character: Jeff. Actors: Don Harvey, Pat Healy.
- The Beverly Hillbillies (1962–1971).
  - Character: Jethro Bodine. Actors: Max Baer Jr., Ray Young (The Return of the Beverly Hillbillies).
- Bewitched (1964–1972).
  - Character: Santa Claus. Actors: Cecil Kellaway, Don Beddoe (1 episode each).
  - Character: Darrin Stephens. Actors: Dick York (1964–1969), Dick Sargent (1969–1972).
  - Character: Gladys Kravitz. Actresses: Alice Pearce (1964–1966), Sandra Gould (1966–1971).
  - Character: Tabitha Stephens. Actresses: Cynthia Black (1966), Heidi and Laura Gentry (1966), Tamar and Julie Young (1966), Diane Murphy (1966–1968), Erin Murphy (1966–1972).
  - Character: Louise Tate. Actresses: Irene Vernon (1964–1966), Kasey Rogers (1966–1972).
- Big Love.
  - Character: Tancy Henrickson. Actresses: Jolean Wejbe (2006–2009), Bella Thorne (2010).
- Bill & Ted's Excellent Adventures (1990–1991).
  - Character: Bill S. Preston, Esq. Actors: Alex Winter (season 1), Evan Richards (season 2).
  - Character: Ted Logan. Actors: Keanu Reeves (season 2), Christopher Kennedy (season 2).
  - Character: Rufus. Actors: George Carlin (season 1), Rick Overton (season 2).
- Blake's 7 (1978–1981).
  - Character: Travis. Actors: Stephen Greif, Brian Croucher.
- Bodies (2023).
  - Character: Commander Elias Mannix/Sir Julian Harker. Actors: Gabriel Howell (2023), Stephen Graham (2053, 1889–93, 1941)
  - Character: Lady Polly (Hillinghead) Harker. Actors: Synnøve Karlsen (1890-3), Greta Scacchi (1941).
  - Character: Mullins. Actors: Max Lohan (1889-90), Michael Byrne (1941).
- Boy Meets World (1993–2000).
  - Character: Morgan Matthews. Actresses: Lily Nicksay (1993–1995), Lindsay Ridgeway (1995–2000).
  - Character: Jedidiah Lawrence (Topanga's father). Actors: Peter Tork, Mark Harelik.
- The Brady Bunch (1969–1974).
  - Character: Marcia Brady. Actresses: Maureen McCormick, Leah Ayres (The Bradys).
  - Character: Jan Brady. Actresses: Eve Plumb, Geri Reischl (The Brady Bunch Hour).
  - Character: Cindy Brady. Actresses: Susan Olsen, Jennifer Runyon (A Very Brady Christmas).
- Buffy the Vampire Slayer.
  - Character: Nikki Wood. Actresses: April Weeden-Washington, K. D. Aubert.

== C ==
- Cadfael (1994–1998).
  - Character: Hugh Beringar. Actors: Sean Pertwee (four episodes), Eoin McCarthy five episodes and Anthony Green for the final three episodes.
- Charmed (1998–2006).
  - Character: Victor Bennett. Actors: Anthony Denison (one episode, where his last name was Halliwell), James Read.
- Cheers (1982–1993).
  - Character: Gary. Actors: Alternating between Joel Polis and Robert Desiderio.
- Citizen Smith (1977–1980).
  - Character: Charles “Charlie” Johnson. Actors: Arto Morris (pilot only), Peter Vaughan (Series 1–2), Tony Steedman (Series 3–4; 1980 Christmas special).
- The Count of Monte Cristo (1998).
  - Character: Edmond Dantès. Actors: Gérard Depardieu and Guillaume Depardieu.
  - Character: Mercedes Igualada. Actresses: Ornella Muti and Naike Rivelli.
- The Crown (2016–2023).
  - Character: Queen Elizabeth II. Actresses: Verity Russell (recurring season 1), Viola Prettejohn (season 6), Claire Foy (seasons 1–2, featured seasons 4 and 6, guest season 5), Olivia Colman (seasons 3–4, featured season 6), Imelda Staunton (season 5–6).
  - Character: Prince Philip, Duke of Edinburgh. Actors: Finn Elliot (season 2, guest season 3), Matt Smith (seasons 1–2), Tobias Menzies (seasons 3–4), Jonathan Pryce (seasons 5–6).
  - Character: Princess Margaret, Countess of Snowdon. Actresses: Beau Gadsdon (season 6, recurring season 1, guest season 3), Vanessa Kirby (seasons 1–2), Helena Bonham Carter (seasons 3–4), Lesley Manville (seasons 5–6).
  - Character: Queen Elizabeth The Queen Mother. Actresses: Victoria Hamilton (seasons 1–2), Marion Bailey (seasons 3–4), Marcia Warren (seasons 5–6).
  - Character: Louis, Earl Mountbatten of Burma. Actors: Greg Wise (seasons 1–2), Charles Dance (season 3, featured season 4).
  - Character: Prince Edward, Duke of Windsor. Actors: Alex Jennings (season 1, featured seasons 2 and 5), Derek Jacobi (featured season 3).
  - Character: Wallis, Duchess of Windsor. Actresses: Lia Williams (season 1, featured seasons 2 and 5), Geraldine Chaplin (featured season 3).
  - Character: Antony Armstrong-Jones, Earl of Snowdon. Actors: Matthew Goode (season 2), Ben Daniels (season 3).
  - Character: Anne, Princess Royal. Actors: Erin Doherty (seasons 3–4), Claudia Harrison (seasons 5–6).
  - Character: Charles, Prince of Wales. Actors: Julian Baring (season 2), Josh O'Connor (seasons 3–4), Dominic West (seasons 5–6).
  - Character: Diana, Princess of Wales. Actors: Emma Corrin (season 4), Elizabeth Debicki (season 5-6).
  - Character: Prince William of Wales. Actors: Lucas Barber Grant and Timothée Sambor (season 4), Senan West (season 5), Rufus Kampa and Ed McVey (season 6).
  - Character: Prince Henry "Harry" of Wales. Actors: Teddy Hawley and Will Powell (season 5), Fflyn Edwards and Luther Ford (season 6).
  - Character: Camilla Parker Bowles. Actors: Emerald Fennell (season 4, featured season 3), Olivia Williams (seasons 5–6).
  - Character: Andrew Parker Bowles. Actors: Andrew Buchan (season 3, recurring season 4), Daniel Flynn (guest season 5).
  - Character: Princess Alice of Battenberg. Actors: Rosalind Knight (recurring season 1), Sophie Leigh Stone (recurring season 2), Jane Lapotaire (season 3).
  - Character: Peter Townsend. Actors: Ben Miles (season 1, featured season 2, guest season 5), Timothy Dalton (featured season 5).
- Cuckoo.
  - Character: Rachel Thompson. Actresses: Tamla Kari (series one), Esther Smith.

== D ==
- Dallas.
  - Character: Miss Ellie Ewing. Actresses: Barbara Bel Geddes (1978–1984, 1985–1990) and Donna Reed (1984–1985).
  - Character: Jenna Wade. Actresses: Morgan Fairchild, Francine Tacker and Priscilla Presley.
  - Character: Kristin Stewart. Actresses: Mary Crosby and Colleen Camp.
- Dark Shadows (1966–1971).
  - Character: Willie Loomis. Actors: James Hall (4 episodes), John Karlen (106 episodes).
- Days of Our Lives (1965-).
  - Character: Roman Brady. Actors: Wayne Northrop, Josh Taylor.
- Deep Space Nine.
  - Character: Dax. Actors: Frank Owen Smith as Curzon Dax, Terry Farrell as Jadzia Dax, Nicole de Boer as Ezri Dax
  - Character: Ishka. Actresses: Andrea Martin, Cecily Adams.
- Diff'rent Strokes (1978–1986).
  - Character: Maggie McKinney-Drummond. Actresses: Dixie Carter, Mary Ann Mobley.
- Dinnerladies (1998–2000).
  - Character: Norman. Actors: Andrew Livingston (series 1), Adrian Hood (series 2).
- Dr. Quinn, Medicine Woman (1993-1998).
  - Character: Colleen Cooper. Actresses: Erika Flores, Jessica Bowman.
- Doctor Who (1963–).
  - Character: The Doctor. Actors: William Hartnell (1963–1966, 1973), Patrick Troughton (1966–1969, 1973, 1983, 1986), Jon Pertwee (1970–1974, 1983, 1993), Tom Baker (1974–1981, 1993), Peter Davison (1981–1984, 1993, 2007, 2022), Richard Hurndall (1983 – replacement for Hartnell), Colin Baker (1984–1986, 1993, 2022), Michael Jayston (1986), Sylvester McCoy (1987–1989, 1993, 1996, 2022), Paul McGann (1996, 2013, 2022), Christopher Eccleston (2005), David Tennant (2005–2010, 2013, 2022–2023), Matt Smith (2010–2013), John Hurt (2013), Peter Capaldi (2013–2017), David Bradley (2017, 2022, for Hartnell), Jodie Whittaker (2018–2022), Jo Martin (2020–2022, 2025), Ncuti Gatwa (2023–2025), Billie Piper (2025).
  - Character: Romana. Actresses: Mary Tamm (1978–1979), Lalla Ward (1979–1981).
  - Character: The Master. Actors: Roger Delgado (1971–1973), Peter Pratt (1977), Geoffrey Beevers (1981), Anthony Ainley (1981–1989), Gordon Tipple (1996), Eric Roberts (1996), Derek Jacobi (2007), John Simm (2007–2010, 2017), Michelle Gomez (2014–2017), Sacha Dhawan (2020-2022).
  - Character: Rassilon. Actors: Richard Mathews (1983), Timothy Dalton (2009–10), Donald Sumpter (2015).
  - Character: Davros. Actors: Michael Wisher (1975), David Gooderson (1979), Terry Molloy (1982–1988), Julian Bleach (2008, 2015).
  - Character: River Song. Actresses: Alex Kingston, Sydney Wade, Nina Toussaint-White, Maya Glace-Green.
  - Character: Borusa. Actors: Angus MacKay (1976), John Arnatt (1978), Leonard Sachs (1983), Philip Latham (1983).
  - Character: The General. Actors: Ken Bones (2013–2015), T'Nia Miller (2015).
  - Character: Jamie McCrimmon. Actors: Frazer Hines, Hamish Wilson (only: The Mind Robber episodes 2–3).
  - Character: The Toymaker. Actors: Michael Gough (1966), Neil Patrick Harris (2023).
  - Character: The Rani. Actors: Kate O'Mara (1985, 1987, 1993), Anita Dobson (2023–2025), Archie Panjabi (2025–2025)
- I Dream of Jeannie (1965–1970).
  - Character: Tony Nelson. Actors: Larry Hagman, Wayne Rogers (I Dream of Jeannie... Fifteen Years Later).
- Dream of the Red Chamber (1987).
  - Character: Jia Yingchun. Actresses: Jin Lili and Mu Yi.
- Dune: Prophecy.
  - Character: Valya Harkonnen. Actors: Jessica Barden (young), Emily Watson.
  - Character: Tula Harkonnen. Actors: Emma Canning (young), Olivia Williams.
  - Character: Sister Francesca. Actors: Charithra Chandran (young), Tabu.
  - Character: Reverend Mother Kasha Jinjo. Actors: Yerin Ha (young), Jihae.
  - Character: Sister Avila. Actors: Sarah Oliver-Watts (young), Barbara Marten.
- Dynasty (1981-1989).
  - Character: Steven Carrington. Actors: Al Corley and Jack Coleman.
  - Character: Fallon Carrington Colby. Actresses: Pamela Sue Martin and Emma Samms.
  - Character: Amanda Carrington. Actresses: Catherine Oxenberg and Karen Cellini.
  - Character: Adam Carrington. Actors: Gordon Thomson and Robin Sachs (Dynasty: The Reunion).
- Dynasty (2017 TV series).
  - Character: Alexis Carrington. Actresses: Nicolette Sheridan, Elizabeth Gilles (3 episodes in season 2), and Elaine Hendrix.
  - Character: Cristal Jennings. Actresses: Ana Brenda Contreras, Daniella Alonso.

== E ==
- Early Edition (1997–2000).
  - Character: Marcia Roberts Hobson. Actresses: Marianne Hagan, Rya Kihlstedt.
- Eight Is Enough (1977–1981).
  - Character: David Bradford. Actors: Mark Hamill (in the pilot), Grant Goodeve.
  - Character: Abby Bradford. Actresses: Betty Buckley, Mary Frann (Eight Is Enough: A Family Reunion), Sandy Faison (An Eight Is Enough Wedding).
- The End of the F***ing World (2017–2019).
  - Character: James. Actors: Jack Veal (young), Alex Lawther.
  - Character: Alyssa. Actors: Holly Beechey (young), Jessica Barden.
- Executive Stress (1986–1988).
  - Character: Donald Fairchild. Actors: Geoffrey Palmer (series 1, 1986), Peter Bowles (series 2 and 3, 1987–88).

== F ==
- The Facts of Life.
  - Character: Monica Warner. Actresses: Pam Huntington, Marj Dusay.
- Falcon Crest.
  - Character: Vicki Gioberti. Actresses: Jamie Rose, Dana Sparks.
- The Fall and Rise of Reginald Perrin (1976–1996).
  - Character: Reggie's son-in-law Tom. Actors: Tim Preece (series 1 and 2, 1976–77), Leslie Schofield (series 3, 1978–79). Preece returned to the role for the later series The Legacy of Reginald Perrin.
- The Fall of the House of Usher (2023).
  - Character: Roderick Usher. Actors: Lincoln Russo (1953), Graham Verchere (1962), Zach Gilford (1979), Bruce Greenwood (2023).
  - Character: Madeline Usher. Actors: Kate Whiddington (1953), Lulu Wilson (1962), Willa Fitzgerald (1979), Mary McDonnell (2023).
  - Character: Frederick Usher. Actors: William Kosovic (1979), Henry Thomas (2023).
  - Character: C. Auguste Dupin. Actors: Malcolm Goodwin (1979), Carl Lumbly (2023).
- Family Matters (1989–1998).
  - Character: Richie Crawford. Actors: Twins Joseph and Julius Wright (season 1) and Bryton James (seasons 2–9)
  - Character: Judy Winslow. Actresses: Valerie Jones (first episode only) and Jaimee Foxworth.
  - Character: Harriette Winslow. Actresses: Jo Marie Payton (1989–1997) and Judyann Elder (1997–1998)
- The Fosters (2013).
  - Character: Jesus Adams Foster. Actors: Jake T. Austin, Noah Centineo.
- Foundation (2021–).
  - Character: Emperor Cleon. Actors: Cooper Carter (young Dawn), Cassian Bilton (Dawn), Lee Pace (Day), Terrence Mann (Dusk).
  - Character: Gaal Dornick. Actors: Teyarnie Galea (young), Lou Llobell.
  - Character: The Mule. Actors: Mikael Persbrandt (season 2), Pilou Asbæk (season 3).
- The Fresh Beat Band.
  - Character: Marina. Actresses: Shayna Rose, Tara Perry
- The Fresh Prince of Bel-Air (1990–1996).
  - Character: Vivian Banks. Actresses: Janet Hubert-Whitten (1990–1993) and Daphne Maxwell Reid (1993–1996).
  - Character: Nicky Banks. Actors: Gregory Wheeler, Ross Bagley.
- Frasier (1993–2004).
  - Character: Frederick Gaylord Crane. Actors: Luke Tarsitano, Trevor Einhorn.
  - Character: Nanny G (Nanette Guzman). Actresses: Dina Spybey, Laurie Metcalf, on Cheers played by Emma Thompson.
- Friends (1994–2004).
  - Character: Ross' first ex-wife Carol Willick. Actresses: Anita Barone (1 episode), Jane Sibbett.
  - Character: Mindy. Actresses: Jennifer Grey (1 episode), Jana Marie Hupp (1 episode)
- Fringe (2008–2013).
  - Character: Michael/Anomaly XB-6783746. Actors: Spencer List (1 episode), Roman Longworth
- Full House (1987–1995).
  - Character: Michelle Elizabeth Tanner. Actresses: Ashley Olsen and Mary-Kate Olsen (contemporaneously due to child labor laws).
  - Character: Harry Takayama. Actors: Nathan Nishiguchi and later recast on the 2016 reboot Fuller House with Michael Sun Lee.

== G ==
- Game of Thrones (2011–2019).
  - Character: Daario Naharis. Actors: Ed Skrein, Michiel Huisman.
  - Character: Gregor Clegane. Actors: Conan Stevens, Ian Whyte, Hafþór Júlíus Björnsson.
- Game On.
  - Character: Matthew Malone. Actors: Ben Chaplin, Neil Stuke.
- The George Burns and Gracie Allen Show (1950).
  - Character: Harry Morton. Actors: Hal March, John Brown, Fred Clark, Larry Keating.
- Ghost Whisperer (2005–2010).
  - Character: Ned Banks. Actors: Tyler Patrick Jones and Christoph Sanders.
- Ghostwriter (1992).
  - Character: Gaby Fernandez. Actresses: Melissa Gonzalez, Mayteana Morales.
  - Character: Reggie Jenkins (Jamal's father). Actors: Samuel L. Jackson, Dean Irby.
  - Character: Mr. Frazier (Lenni's father). Actors: Richard Cox, Keith Langsdale.
- Gilligan's Island (1964–1967).
  - Character: Ginger Grant. Actresses: Kit Smythe (pilot), Tina Louise, Judith Baldwin (Rescue from Gilligan's Island and The Castaways on Gilligan's Island), Constance Forslund (The Harlem Globetrotters on Gilligan's Island).
- The Goldbergs (2013–2023).
  - Character: Adam Goldberg. Actors: Sean Giambrone, Patton Oswalt (adult Adam narrating the episodes).
- The Golden Girls (1985–1992).
  - Character: Big Daddy. Actors: Murray Hamilton, David Wayne.
  - Character: Gloria. Actresses Doris Belack, Dena Dietrich.
  - Character: Dennis. Actors: Dennis Drake, Jonathan Perpich.
- Gotham (2014–2019).
  - Character: Selina Kyle. Actresses: Camren Bicondova, Lili Simmons(finale only).
- Grace Under Fire (1992–1998).
  - Character: Patrick Kelly. Actors: Dylan and Cole Sprouse (contemporaneously due to child labor laws).
- Grounded for Life. Character: Dan O'Keefe. Actors: Floyd Van Buskirk (2001), Gregory Jbara (2002–2005).
- Growing Pains (1985–1992).
  - Character: Carol Seaver. Actresses: Elizabeth Ward (1985) (pilot, can be glimpsed in first episode wide shot), Tracy Gold (1985–92), Judith Barsi (1988) (1 episode flashback).
  - Character: Chrissy Seaver. Actresses: Kirsten Dohring & Kelsey Dohring (1988–1990) (contemporaneously due to child labor laws), Ashley Johnson (1990–92), Khrystyne Haje (1990) (1 episode flash forward).
  - Character: Mike Seaver. Actor: Kirk Cameron (1985–1992), Victor DiMattia (1988) (1 episode flashback).

== H ==
- Hamish Macbeth (1995–1997). Character: Lachlan McCrae, Sr. Actors: Jimmy Yuill (Series 1), Billy Riddoch (Series 2–3).
- Hannibal (2014–2015). Character: Mason Verger, Actors: Michael Pitt (Season 2), Joe Anderson (Season 3).
- Happy Days (1974–1984).
  - Character: Chuck Cunningham. Actors: Gavan O'Herlihy, Randolph Roberts.
  - Character: Dr. Mickey Malph. Actors: Jack Dodson, Alan Oppenheimer.
- The Haunting of Bly Manor (2020).
  - Character: Danielle Clayton. Actors: Elizabeth Allhands (young), Victoria Pedretti.
  - Character: Jamie Taylor. Actors: Amelia Eve, Carla Gugino (old).
  - Character: Edmund O’Mara. Actors: Daxton Gujral (young), Roby Attal.
  - Character: Owen Sharma. Actors: Rahul Kohli, Kamal Khan (old).
  - Character: Viola Willoughby-Lloyd. Actors: Kate Siegel, Daniela Dib (as the Lady of the Lake).
  - Character: Flora Wingrave. Actors: Alice Comer (young), Amelie Bea Smith, Christie Burke (old).
  - Character: Henry Wingrave. Actors: Henry Thomas, Duncan Fraser (old).
  - Character: Miles Wingrave. Actors: Kasen Kelly (young), Benjamin Evan Ainsworth, Thomas Nicholson (old).
- The Haunting of Hill House (2018).
  - Character: Steven Crain. Actors: Paxton Singleton (young), Michiel Huisman.
  - Character: Hugh Crain. Actors: Henry Thomas (young), Timothy Hutton.
  - Character: Shirley Crain Harris. Actors: Lulu Wilson (young), Elizabeth Reaser.
  - Character: Luke Crain. Actors: Julian Hilliard (young), Oliver Jackson-Cohen.
  - Character: Theodora Crain. Actors: Mckenna Grace (young), Kate Siegel.
  - Character: Eleanor Crain Vance. Actors: Violet McGraw (young), Victoria Pedretti.
- Heroes.
  - Character: Hiro Nakamura. Actors: Masi Oka (main actor), Garrett Masuda, Sekai Murashige and Mikey Kawata. The other actors were seen in the same time period with Masi Oka via time travel.
  - Character: Charlie Andrews. Actresses: Jayma Mays, K Callan.
  - Character: Molly Walker. Actresses: Adair Tishler (original series), Francesca Eastwood (Heroes: Reborn).
- How I Met Your Father
  - Character: Sophie Tompkins. Actresses: Hilary Duff, Kim Cattrall (in 2050)

== I ==
- The Incredible Hulk (1977–1982).
  - Character: Dr. David Banner/The Hulk. Actors: Bill Bixby (In form of David Banner) and Lou Ferrigno (In Hulk form). Ted Cassidy also did the voice of The Hulk.
- The Inspector Lynley Mysteries (2001–2007).
  - Character: Helen Clyde/Helen Lynley. Actors: Emma Fielding (Pilot), Lesley Vickerage (Seasons 1–3), Catherine Russell (Season 5).
- Interview with the Vampire (2022–).
  - Character: Claudia. Actors: Bailey Bass (season 1), Delainey Hayles (season 2).
  - Character: Daniel Molloy. Actors: Luke Brandon Field (young), Eric Bogosian.
- It (1990).
  - Character: Bill Denbrough. Actors: Jonathan Brandis (1960), Richard Thomas (1990).
  - Character: Beverly Marsh. Actors: Emily Perkins (1960), Annette O'Toole (1990).
  - Character: Ben Hanscom. Actors: Brandon Crane (1960), John Ritter (1990).
  - Character: Richie Tozier. Actors: Seth Green (1960), Harry Anderson (1990).
  - Character: Eddie Kaspbrak. Actors: Adam Faraizl (1960), Dennis Christopher (1990).
  - Character: Mike Hanlon. Actors: Marlon Taylor (1960), Tim Reid (1990).
  - Character: Stanley Uris. Actors: Ben Heller (1960), Richard Masur (1990).
  - Character: Henry Bowers. Actors: Jarred Blanchard (1960), Michael Cole (1990).
- It: Welcome to Derry (2025).
  - Character: Francis Shaw. Actors: Diesel La Torraca (1908), James Remar (1962).
  - Character: Ingrid Kersh. Actors: Emma-Leigh Cullum (1908), Tyner Rushing (1935), Madeleine Stowe (1962), Joan Gregson (1988).
  - Character: Rose. Actors: Violet Sutherland (1908), Kimberly Norris Guerrero (1962).
  - Character: Taniel. Actors: Tres Garcia (young), Joshua Odjick (1962).

== J ==
- The Jeffersons (1975–1985).
  - Character: Lionel Jefferson. Actors: Mike Evans, Damon Evans. (Mike Evans returned for two more seasons after Damon Evans' departure).
  - Character: Mr. Whittendale. Actors: Ivor Francis, Jack Fletcher.
  - Character: Allan Willis. Actors: Andrew Rubin, Jay Hammer.
- Jonathan Creek (1997–2016).
  - Character: Adam Klaus. Actors: Anthony Head (1997), Stuart Milligan (1998–2013).

== K ==
- Kangxi Dynasty.
  - Character: Kangxi Emperor. Actors: Chen Daoming (Adult), Li Nan (Teenager), Chen Weichen (Child).
- Kasautii Zindagii Kay (2001). The role of Anurag Basu was played by two actors.
- Keeping Up Appearances (1990–1995).
  - Character: Rose. Actresses: Shirley Stelfox (1990), Mary Millar (1991–1995).
- The King of Queens. The role of Kirby Palmer was played by multiple child actors.

== L ==
- Last Man Standing.
  - Character: Boyd Baxter. Actors: Evan and Luke Kruntchev, Flynn Morrison, and Jet Jurgensmeyer.
  - Character: Kristin Baxter. Actresses: Alexandra Krosney and Amanda Fuller.
  - Character: Mandy Baxter. Actresses: Molly Ephraim and Molly McCook.
  - Character: Ryan Vogelson. Actors: Nick Jonas and Jordan Masterson.
- Last Tango in Halifax.
  - Character: William. Actors: Edward Ashley and Dean Smith.
- Lexx.
  - Character: Zev Bellringer/Xev. Actresses: Lisa Hines (beginning of episode 1 in series 1), Eva Habermann (series 1 and the first four episodes of series 2), Xenia Seeberg (series 2 through 4).
- Life Goes On.
  - Character: Paige Thatcher. Actresses: Monique Lanier (1989–1990) and Tracey Needham (1990–1993).
- Lois & Clark: The New Adventures of Superman (1993–1997).
  - Character: Jimmy Olsen. Actors: Michael Landes (1993–1994), Justin Whalin (1994–1997), Jack Larson (Episode: Brutal Youth).
  - Character: H. G. Wells. Actors: Terry Kiser, Hamilton Camp.
  - Character: Lucy Lane. Actresses: Elizabeth Barones, Roxana Zal.
- The Lone Ranger.
  - Character: The Lone Ranger. Actors: Clayton Moore (1949–1951, 1954–1957) and John Hart (1952–1953).
- The Lost Prince (2003).
  - Character: Prince John. Actors: Daniel Williams, Matthew James Thomas.
  - Character: Prince George. Actors: Brock Everitt-Elwick, Rollo Weeks.
  - Character: Tsarevich Alexei. Actors: Samuel Page, Kostya Severov.

== M ==
- Mad About You (1992–1999, 2019).
  - Character: Gus Stemple. Actors: John Karlen, Carroll O'Connor.
  - Character: Theresa Stemple. Actresses: Penny Fuller, Carol Burnett.
- Mad Men (2007–2015).
  - Character: Robert "Bobby" Draper. Actors: Maxwell Huckabee, Aaron Hart, Jared Gilmore.
- Malory Towers (2020–2025).
  - Character: Elizabeth Grayling. Actors: Jennifer Wigmore, Birgitte Solem
- Maude (1972–1978).
  - Character: Carol Traynor. Actresses: Marcia Rodd (in the pilot), Adrienne Barbeau.
  - Character: Phillip Traynor. Actors: Brian Morrison, Kraig Metzinger.
- Make Room for Daddy.
  - Character: Terry Williams. Actresses: Sherry Jackson, Penney Parker
- M*A*S*H (1972–1983).
  - Character: Father Francis Mulcahy. Actors: William Christopher, George Morgan.
  - Character: Lt. Col. Donald Penobscott. Actors: Beeson Carroll, Mike Henry (American football).
- Me, Myself & I (2017).
  - Character: Alex Riley. Actors: Jack Dylan Grazer, Bobby Moynihan, John Larroquette.
- Mighty Morphin Alien Rangers.
  - Character: Tommy Oliver. Actors: Jason David Frank (as a teen) and Michael R. Gotto (as a child).
  - Character: Rocky DeSantos. Actors: Steve Cardenas (as a teen) and Michael J. O'Laskey (as a child).
- Mike and Angelo (1989–2000).
  - Character: Angelo. Actors: Tyler Butterworth, Tim Whitnall.
- Miss Austen (2025).
  - Character: Cassandra Austen. Actors: Synnøve Karlsen (young), Keeley Hawes.
  - Character: Mary Austen. Actors: Liv Hill (young), Jessica Hynes.
  - Character: Anna Austen Lefroy. Actors: Vivian Battley (young), Carys Bowkett.
- Mixed-ish (2019).
  - Character: Rainbow Johnson. Actresses: Arica Himmel, Tracee Ellis Ross(as an adult narrating the episodes, as well as being seen in flash-forwards, and in young Rainbow's mirror.).
- Monday Night RAW.
  - Character: Doink the Clown. Actors: Matt Osborne, Steve Keirn (a "double Doink", concurrently with Osborne), Steve Lombardi, Ray Apollo.
- Monk (2002–2009).
  - Character: Trudy Monk. Actresses: Stellina Rusich, Melora Hardin.
  - Character: Benjy Flemming. Actors: Kane Ritchotte, Max Morrow.
  - Character: Dale "The Whale" Biederbeck. Actors: Adam Arkin, Tim Curry, Ray Porter.
- The Munsters (1964–1966).
  - Character: Marilyn Munster. Actresses: Beverly Owen, Pat Priest, Debbie Watson (Munster, Go Home!), Jo McDonnell (The Munsters' Revenge). In the pilot episode, the roles of Lily Munster and Eddie Munster were played by different actors.
- My Hero.
  - Character: Thermoman. Actors: Ardal O'Hanlon, James Dreyfus.
- My Parents Are Aliens.
  - Character: Sophie Johnson. Actors: Barbara Durkin, Carla Mendonça.
- My Wife and Kids.
  - Character: Claire. Actresses: Jazz Raycole, Jennifer Freeman.
  - Character: Vanessa. Actresses: Meagan Good (5 episodes), Brooklyn Sudano.

== N ==
- Not Going Out.
  - Character: Geoffrey Adams. Actors: Timothy West (Series 2–3), Geoffrey Whitehead (Series 4–).

== O ==
- The Odd Couple (1970–1975).
  - Character: Leonard Unger. Actors: Willie Aames, Leif Garrett.
- Once Upon a Time.
  - Character: Henry Mills. Actors: Jared S. Gilmore, Andrew J. West.
- Our Flag Means Death (2022–2023).
  - Character: Stede Bonnet. Actors: Theo Darby (young), Rhys Darby.
  - Character: Jim Jimenez. Actors: Allyson Juliette (young), Vico Ortiz.
  - Character: Edward "Blackbeard" Teach. Actors: Mateo Gallegos (young), Taika Waititi.

== P ==
- Paper Girls (2022).
  - Character: Tiffany Quilkin. Actors: Camryn Jones (1988), Sekai Abenì (1999).
  - Character: Erin Tieng. Actors: Riley Lai Nelet (1988), Ali Wong (2019).
  - Character: KJ Brandman. Actors: Fina Strazza (1988), Delia Cunningham (1999).
- Parker Lewis Can't Lose (1990–1993).
  - Character: Parker's mother. Actors: Anne Bloom, Mary Ellen Trainor.
- Party of Five (1994–2000).
  - Character: Owen Salinger. Actors: Alexander and Zachary Ahnert, Brendan and Tyler Porter, Andrew and Stephen Cavarno, and Jacob Smith.
- The Partridge Family (1970–1974).
  - Character: Chris Partridge. Actors: Jeremy Gelbwaks, Brian Forster
- Pee-wee's Playhouse (1986–1990).
  - Character: The King of Cartoons. Actors: Gilbert Lewis (first season), William H. Marshall (subsequent seasons).
- Peter the Great (1986).
  - Character: Tsar Peter the Great. Actors: Maximilian Schell, Jan Niklas, Graham McGrath.
- Petticoat Junction (1963-1970).
  - Character: Bobbie Jo Bradley. Actresses: Pat Woodell, Lori Saunders.
  - Character: Billie Jo Bradley. Actresses: Jeannine Riley, Gunilla Hutton, Meredith MacRae.
- Phyllis.
  - Character: Julie Erskine. Actresses: Barbara Colby and Liz Torres.
- Picket Fences (1992–1996).
  - Character: Myrian Wambaugh. Actresses: Ann Morgan Guilbert and Erica Yohn.
- Power Rangers Turbo.
  - Character: Divatox and Dimitria. Actresses: Carol Hoyt and Hilary Shepard Turner. Turner played the role in Turbo: A Power Rangers Movie, then replaced Hoyt after several episodes.
- The Prisoner (1967–1968).
  - Character: Number Six. Actors: Patrick McGoohan, Nigel Stock (episode "Do Not Forsake Me Oh My Darling")
  - Character: Number Two. Actors: George Baker, David Bauer, Patrick Cargill, Georgina Cookson, Guy Doleman, Clifford Evans, Colin Gordon, Kenneth Griffith, Rachel Herbert, Leo McKern, Mary Morris, Derren Nesbitt, Eric Portman, Anton Rodgers, John Sharp, Andre Van Gyseghem, Peter Wyngarde.
- Private Practice.
  - Character: Naomi Bennett. Actors: Merrin Dungey (in the backdoor pilot episode), Audra McDonald.
- Psych.
  - Character: Bill Guster. Actors: Ernie Hudson (S2.E10), Keith David (S3.E9)
  - Character: Young Shawn. Actors: Josh Hayden (pilot), Kyle Pejpar (S1.E2), Liam James (S1–S5), Skyler Gisondo (S5–S8).
  - Character: Young Gus. Actors: Isaah Brown (S1), Carlos McCullers II (S2–S8).

== R ==
- Red Dwarf.
  - Character: Kristine Kochanski. Actresses: Clare Grogan, Chloë Annett.
  - Character: Kryten. Actors: David Ross (one episode), Robert Llewellyn.
  - Character: ship's computer, Holly. Actors: Norman Lovett during series I, II, VII and VIII, and Hattie Hayridge in series III to V.
- Roseanne (1988–1997).
  - Character: Rebecca "Becky" Conner-Healy. Actresses: Lecy Goranson (seasons 1–5 and 8), Sarah Chalke. (seasons 6, 7, 8 as guest star, 9).
  - Character: David Jacob "DJ" Conner. Actors: Sal Barone (in the pilot), Michael Fishman.
  - Character: Lonnie Anderson. Actors: Josh C. Williams (1988–1989), Luke Edwards (1989), Kristopher Kent Hill (1991–1994).
  - Character: Audrey Conner. Actors: Ann Wedgeworth, Debbie Reynolds.

== S ==
- Saved by the Bell (1989–1993).
  - Character: Derek Morris. Actors: Robert Pine, John Sanderford.
- Scott Pilgrim Takes Off (2023).
  - Character: Scott Pilgrim. Actors (English): Finn Wolfhard (teen), Michael Cera, Will Forte (old). Actors (Japanese): Hiro Shimono, Fumihiko Tachiki (old).
  - Character: Ramona Flowers. Actors: Mary Elizabeth Winstead (English), Fairouz Ai (Japanese).
  - Character: Matthew Patel. Actors: Satya Bhabha (English), Shinji Saitō (Japanese).
  - Character: Wallace Wells. Actors: Kieran Culkin (English), Masaya Fukunishi (Japanese).
  - Character: Lucas Lee. Actors: Chris Evans (English), Yuichi Nakamura (Japanese).
  - Character: Stacey Pilgrim. Actors: Anna Kendrick (English), Misato Matsuoka (Japanese).
  - Character: Natalie "Envy" Adams. Actors: Brie Larson (English), Emily Haines (English, singing voice), Kana Hanazawa (Japanese).
  - Character: Kimberly "Kim" Pine. Actors: Alison Pill (English), Tomo Muranaka (Japanese).
  - Character: Julie Powers. Actors: Aubrey Plaza (English), Yū Kobayashi (Japanese).
  - Character: Todd Ingram. Actors: Brandon Routh (English), Wataru Hatano (Japanese).
  - Character: Gideon Graves. Actors: Jason Schwartzman (English), Tomokazu Seki (Japanese).
  - Character: "Young" Neil Nordegraf. Actors: Johnny Simmons (English), Yuto Kawasaki (Japanese).
  - Character: Stephen Stills. Actors: Mark Webber (English), Anri Katsu (Japanese).
  - Character: Roxanne "Roxie" Richter. Actors: Mae Whitman (English), Naomi Ōzora (Japanese).
  - Character: Knives Chau. Actors: Ellen Wong (English), Aoi Koga (Japanese).
  - Characters: Kyle and Ken Katayanagi. Actors: Julian Cihi (English), Shunsuke Takeuchi (Japanese).
- Seinfeld (1989–1998).
  - Character: Frank Costanza. Actors: John Randolph, Jerry Stiller.
  - Character: Morty Seinfeld (Jerry's father). Actors: Phil Bruns, Barney Martin.
  - Character: Lloyd Braun. Actors: Peter Keleghan, Matt McCoy.
  - Character: Newman. Actors: Larry David (voice only in one episode), Wayne Knight.
- Serenade of Peaceful Joy (2020).
  - Character: Huirou (Princess Fukang). Actors: Ren Min (Adult), He Sitian (Teenager), Ren Feier (Pre-teen), Zhang Yuyi (Child), Su Yike (Toddler).
- Sense8.
  - Character: Capheus "Van Damme" Onyango. Actors: Aml Ameen (2015), Toby Onwumere (2016)
- Sesame Street.
  - Character: Gordon Robinson. Actors: Garrett Saunders (test pilots), Matt Robinson, Hal Miller, Roscoe Orman.
  - Character: Miles Robinson. Actors: Miles Orman, Imani Patterson, Olamide Faison.
  - Character: Gabi. Actors: Dick Maitland's son Bryan (born 1989), Gabriela Rose Reagan, Desiree Casado.
  - Character: David Handord. Actors: Leonard Jackson (1989–1990), David Smyrl (1990–1998).
- Shameless.
  - Character: Carl Gallagher. Actors: Luke Tittensor (2004), Elliott Tittensor (2004–present).
- Sharp Objects (2018).
  - Character: Camille Preaker. Actors: Sophia Lillis (young), Amy Adams.
- Shazam!
  - Character: Captain Marvel. Actors: Jackson Bostwick, John Davey.
- The Shining (1997).
  - Character: Danny Torrance. Actors: Courtland Mead, Wil Horneff (adult).
- Silo (2023–).
  - Character: Juliette Nichols. Actors: Amelie Child-Villiers (young), Rebecca Ferguson.
  - Character: Knox. Actors: Charlie Coombs (young), Shane McRae.
  - Character: Shirley Campbell. Actors: Ida Brooke (young), Remmie Milner.
  - Character: Jimmy Conroy. Actors: Cameron Bell (young), Steve Zahn.
- The Six Million Dollar Man.
  - Character: Bigfoot. Actors: André the Giant, Ted Cassidy.
  - Character: Dr. Rudy Wells. Actors: Martin Balsam, Alan Oppenheimer, Martin E. Brooks.
- Smallville.
  - Character: Morgan Edge. Actors: Rutger Hauer, Patrick Bergin.
- Spartacus (2010).
  - Character: Spartacus. Actors: Andy Whitfield (First season) and Liam McIntyre (Seasons third and fourth).
- Split (2009).
  - Character: Carmel. Actresses: Anna Zaikin (2009) and Agam Rodberg (2010–2012).
- Stargate SG-1.
  - Character: Dr. Elizabeth Weir. Actresses: Jessica Steen (2 episodes), Torri Higginson.
- Station Eleven (2021–2022).
  - Character: Kirsten Raymonde. Actors: Matilda Lawler (young), Mackenzie Davis.
  - Character: Tyler Leander/The Prophet. Actors: Julian Obradors (young), Daniel Zovatto.
- The Son.
  - Character: Eli McCulloch. Actors: Pierce Brosnan, Jacob Lofland.
- Superboy.
  - Character: Lex Luthor. Actors: Scott Wells (1988–1989) and Sherman Howard (1989–1992).
  - Character: Superboy. Actors: John Haymes Newton (1988–1989) and Gerard Christopher (1989–1992)
- Star Trek.
  - Character: Christopher Pike. Actors: Jeffrey Hunter (1965), Sean Kenney (1966), Anson Mount (2022–present)
- Supergirl.
  - Character: Alura Zor-El. Actresses: Laura Benanti (2015–2017) and Erica Durance (2017–present).
- Superman & Lois (2021).
  - Character: Jonathan Kent. Actors: Jordan Elsass and Michael Bishop.
- Survivors (1975–1977).
  - Character: Lizzie Willoughby. Actresses: Tanya Ronder (1975–1976) and Angie Stevens (1977).
- Sweet Valley High.
  - Character: Todd Wilkins. Actors: Ryan Bittle (1994–1996) and Jeremy Garrett (1996–1997).
- Sydney to the Max (2019).
  - Character: Max Reynolds. Actors: Jackson Dollinger(child), Ian Reed Kesler(adult).

== T ==
- Terminator Zero (2024).
  - Character: Malcolm Lee. Actors: Yūya Uchida (Japanese), André Holland (English).
  - Character: Eiko. Actors: Toa Yukinari (Japanese), Sonoya Mizuno (English).
  - Character: Misaki. Actors: Saori Hayami (Japanese), Sumalee Montano (English).
  - Character: Kenta Lee. Actors: Hiro Shimono (Japanese), Armani Jackson (English).
  - Character: Reika Lee. Actors: Miyuki Sato (Japanese), Gideon Adlon (English).
  - Character: Hiro Lee. Actors: Shizuka Ishigami (Japanese), Carter Rockwood (English).
  - Character: Kokoro. Actors: Atsumi Tanezaki (Japanese), Rosario Dawson (English).
  - Character: The Terminator. Actors: Yasuhiro Mamiya (Japanese), Timothy Olyphant (English).
  - Character: The Prophet. Actors: Mari Yokoo (Japanese); Ann Dowd (English).
  - Character: Ani/Annie. Actors: Ayaka Shimoyamada (Japanese); Julie Nathanson (English).
  - Character: Natsuki. Actors: Yuka Keicho (Japanese); Vanessa Marshall (English).
  - Character: Detective Fujino. Actors: Chō (Japanese); Fred Tatasciore (English).
  - Character: Detective Shiraki. Actors: Yōhei Azakami (Japanese); Nicolas Roye (English).
- 'Til Death (2006–2010).
  - Character: Allison Stark. Actresses: Krysten Ritter, Laura Clery, Lindsey Broad, Kate Micucci.
- That '70s Show (1998–2006).
  - Character: Laurie Forman. Actresses: Lisa Robin Kelly, Christina Moore.
  - Character: Pamela Burkhart. Actresses: Eve Plumb, Brooke Shields.
- The Andy Griffith Show (1960–1968).
  - Character: Ben Weaver. Actors: Will Wright (until Wrights death in 1962), Tol Avery, Jason Johnson (Johnson played in five episodes of The Andy Griffith Show, but only played Ben Weaver in two).
  - Character: Floyd Lawson. Actors: Walter Baldwin, Howard McNear.
- The Midnight Club (2022).
  - Character: Julia Jayne/Shasta. Actors: Larsen Thompson (young), Samantha Sloyan.
- The Office.
  - Character: Pam's Mother. Actresses: Shannon Cochran, Linda Purl.
- The Time Traveler's Wife (2022).
  - Character: Claire Abshire. Actresses: Rose Leslie (adult), Caitlin Shorey and Everleigh McDonnell (younger).
  - Character: Henry DeTamble. Actors: Theo James (adult), Brian Artemus and Jason David (younger).
- The Way Home (2023).
  - Character: Elliot Augustine. Actors: Evan Williams and David Webster (as a teen and young adult).
  - Character: Colton Landry. Actors: Jefferson Brown, Jordan Dow (as a teen), Lincoln Reign McCaffrey (as a child).
  - Character: Tessa Cooper. Actresses: Hannah Storey (as a teen), Kelsey Falconer (adult)
  - Character: Evelyn "Evie" Goodwin. Actresses: Susan Hamman (as an adult), Devin Cecchetto (as a teen), River Price-Maenpaa (as a child)
  - Character: Delilah Watson-Landry. Actresses: Andie MacDowell, Julia Tomasone (as a teen)
  - Character: Fern Landry. Actresses: Jill Frappier (1974), Bianca Melchior (1925)
  - Character: Jacob Landry. Actors: Remy Smith (child) and Spencer McPherson (adult)
  - Character: Kat Landry. Actresses: Chyler Leigh and Alex Hook.
- This Is Us.
  - Character: William Hill. Actors: Ron Cephas Jones, Jermel Nakia (as a young man).
  - Character: Kate Pearson. Actresses: Chrissy Metz (as an adult in the present), Mackenzie Hancsicsak (as a child), Hannah Zeile (as a teen).
  - Character: Kevin Pearson. Actors: Justin Hartley (as an adult in the present), Parker Bates (as a child), Logan Shroyer (as a teen).
  - Character: Nick Pearson. Actors: Michael Angarano (as a young man), Griffin Dunne (present day).
  - Character: Randall Pearson. Actors: Sterling K. Brown (as an adult in the present), Lonnie Chavis (as a child), Niles Fitch (as a teen).
- Too Close for Comfort (1980–1987).
  - Character: Arthur Wainwright. Actors: Hamilton Camp, Graham Jarvis.
- Two and a Half Men (2003–2015).
  - Character: Delores Pasternak. Actresses: Missi Pyle, Alicia Witt.
- Two Guys and a Girl.
  - Characters: Berg's Parents. Actors: Howard Hesseman, Steve Landesberg, Cheryl Ladd, Bo Derek.
- True Blood.
  - Character: James. Actors: Luke Grimes, Nathan Parsons.

== V ==
- V (1984–1985).
  - Character: Elizabeth. Actresses: Jenny Beck and Jennifer Cooke.
- The Vampire Diaries (2009).
  - Character: Silas. Actors: Paul Wesley, Raymond Scott Parks, Jason Spisak, Camille Guaty, Jasmine Guy, David Alpay, Candice Accola, Steven R. McQueen, Claire Holt, Ian Somerhalder, Joseph Morgan, Zach Roerig, Marguerite MacIntyre, Matthew Davis and Nina Dobrev.

== W ==
- The Waltons (1972–1981).
  - Character: John Boy. Actors: Richard Thomas, Robert Wightman, Earl Hamner Jr. (narrating the episodes).
- The Wheel of Time (2021).
  - Character: Mat Cauthon. Actors: Barney Harris (Season 1), Dónal Finn (Season 2).
- Wilfred.
  - Character: Catherine Newman. Actresses: Mary Steenburgen, Mimi Rogers.
- Wilsberg
  - Character: Georg Wilsberg. Actors: Joachim Król (Episode 1), Leonard Lansink (since Episode 2)
- WKRP in Cincinnati (1978–1982).
  - Character: Mrs. Carlson. Actresses: Sylvia Sidney, Carol Bruce.
- The Wonder Years (1988–1993).
  - Character: Kevin Arnold. Actors: Fred Savage, Daniel Stern (adult Kevin narrating the episodes).
- The Wonder Years (2021).
  - Character: Dean Williams. Actors: Elisha "E. J." Williams, Don Cheadle (adult Dean narrating the episodes).
- WWE Raw.
  - Character: Samantha Orton. Actresses: Laura Croft, Samantha Speno (herself).
- Woh (1998).
  - Character: Ashutosh Dhar. Actors: Shreyas Talpade (young), Ashutosh Gowariker.
  - Character: Raja. Actors: Ankur Javeri (young), Nasirr Khan.
  - Character: Sanjeev. Actors: Parag Nair (young), Anupam Bhattacharya.
  - Character: Ronnie Batliwala. Actors: Sumeet Goradia (young), Amit Mistry.
  - Character: Julie. Actors: Namrata Gaur (young), Seema Shetty.
  - Character: Shiva. Actors: Adesh Rathi (young), Ankush Mohla.
- Wolfblood (2017–2021).
  - Character: Dr. Rebecca Whitewood. Actresses: Effie Woods, Letty Butler.

== Y ==
- Yasuke (2021).
  - Character: Yasuke. Actors: Jun Soejima (Japanese), LaKeith Stanfield (English).
  - Character: Saki. Actors: Kiko Tamura (Japanese), Maya Tanida (English).
  - Character: Natsumaru. Actors: Fusako Urabe (Japanese), Ming-Na Wen (English).
  - Character: Ichika. Actors: Rie Tanaka (Japanese), Gwendoline Yeo (English).
  - Character: Morisuke. Actors: Yu Kamio (Japanese), Paul Nakauchi (English).
  - Character: Ishikawa. Actors: Eri Kitamura (Japanese), Dia Frampton (English).
  - Character: Haruto. Shunsuke Kubozuka (Japanese), Darren Criss (English).
  - Character: Nikita. Actors: Hiroki Nanami (Japanese), Julie Marcus (English).
  - Character: Achoja. Actors: Kenji Kitamura (Japanese), William Christopher Stephens (English).
  - Character: Abraham. Actors: Shigeru Ushiyama (Japanese), Dan Donohue (English).
  - Character: Yami no Damiyō. Actors: Yoshiko Sakakibara (Japanese), Amy Hill (English).
- Young Rock (2021–2023).
  - Character: Dwayne Johnson. Actors: Adrian Groulx, Bradley Constant, Uli Latukefu, and Dwayne himself.
- Young Sheldon (2017–2024).
  - Character: Sheldon Cooper. Actors: Iain Armitage, Jim Parsons (adult Sheldon narrating the episodes).
  - Character: Amy Farrah Fowler. Actors: Lily Sanfelippo (1 episode), Mayim Bialik (adult Amy narrating 2 episodes).
  - Character: Howard Wolowitz. Actors: Ethan Reed Stern (1 episode), Simon Helberg (adult Howard narrating 1 episode).

== Z ==
- Z Nation (2014–2018).
  - Character: Lucy Murphy. Actors: Cora M. Abdallah, Madelyn Grace, Bea Corley, Caitlin Carmichael, Kelly Washington, Tara Holt, Sara Coates, Madonna Magee.
- Zoo Doctor: My Mom the Vet (2008–2025).
  - Character: Jonas Mertens. Actors: Ludwig Zimmeck, Lennart Betzgen.
  - Character: Luisa Mertens. Actresses: Paula Hartmann, Deborah Mary Schneidermann, Lilly Wiedemann.

== See also ==
- List of television performers who died during production
