= Sesame Street, Special =

- Written by: Norman Stiles
- Directed by: Jon Stone
- Theme music composer: Joe Raposo; Jon Stone; Bruce Hart
- Opening theme: "Can You Tell Me How to Get to Sesame Street?"
- Ending theme: "Put Down The Duckie"
- Country of origin: United States
- Original language: English

Production
- Executive producer: Dulcy Singer
- Running time: 47 minutes
- Production company: Children's Television Workshop

Original release
- Network: PBS
- Release: March 5, 1988

Related
- Big Bird's Birthday or Let Me Eat Cake

Sesame Street, Special is a pledge-drive special that is based on the children's series, Sesame Street. It aired on PBS stations in March 1988 as part of PBS' March fundraiser.

Random House Home Video released the special on VHS in 1994; the release changed the title to Put Down the Duckie and removed the pledge break segment.

== Plot ==
The special begins with Gladys Knight & the Pips performing the Sesame Street theme. Phil Donahue says Sesame Street is a place where everyone can live in perfect harmony. Oscar and the grouches dispute this because there is not enough trash or arguing and too much cooperating, and Maria says everything is too nice for Oscar, and the street has the right amount of those things. Count von Count agrees that Sesame Street is not perfect because there is not enough counting. Ernie says his Rubber Duckie wants to say something, and everyone lets him because the duckie deserves to squeak. A Dinger, a duck and a Honker also want to say something. Linda uses sign language to say that everyone on Sesame Street really likes kids; the Count agrees with Linda but still believes the street needs more counting. Phil leaves Sesame Street and the Count and grouches follow him. The Monsterpiece Theater sketch "The 39 Stairs" is repeated from a previous episode.

Oscar is upset because Bob will sing "The People in Your Neighborhood". Bob is joined by tennis player Martina Navratilova, reporter Barbara Walters, and consumer advocate Ralph Nader. Oscar says he liked the song after it ends. Ernie tells Hoots the Owl that when he tries to play a saxophone, he squeaks his Rubber Duckie, so Hoots sings "Put Down the Duckie" along with several celebrities. Reporter Kermit the Frog wants to know why Oscar likes public television, but he does not like it. Kermit mentions some reasons to like public television, but Oscar prefers the opposites. Kermit believes that Oscar does not like public television and introduces a pledge break. Oscar is interested in it and Kermit says that he can watch it now. After the pledge drive, Oscar says he taped it.

Three sketches from previous episodes are repeated; "Oh, How I Miss My X", "Grover the Singing and Dancing Waiter", and "Sing Your Synonyms". Robert MacNeil hosts a Sesame Street Special Report discussing the "cookiegate affair", where Cookie Monster was accused of stealing Susan and Gordon's cookies; Kermit is Cookie Monster's lawyer. James Taylor performing "Jellyman Kelly" with some kids is repeated from a previous episode. In "Pretty Great Performances", Placido Flamingo and the Sesame Street All-Animal Orchestra sing "Italian Street Song", conducted by Seiji Ozawa. More celebrities sing "Put Down the Duckie" over the credits. In a post-credits scene, Hoots asks Ernie to help him; every time Hoots squeaks his Rubber Duckie, he plays his saxophone too. Ernie tells Hoots, "you gotta put down the saxophone if you wanna squeak your duckie!"

== Cast ==
=== Humans ===
- Alison Bartlett as Gina
- Linda Bove as Linda
- Northern Calloway as David
- Emilio Delgado as Luis
- Loretta Long as Susan
- Kermit Love as Willy
- Sonia Manzano as Maria
- Bill McCutcheon as Uncle Wally
- Bob McGrath as Bob
- Chet O'Brien as Mr. Macintosh
- Roscoe Orman as Gordon

=== Muppet performers ===
- Caroll Spinney as Big Bird, Oscar the Grouch and Bruno the Trashman
- Frank Oz as Bert, Cookie Monster and Grover
- Jerry Nelson as Count von Count, Mr. Johnson and Announcer
- Richard Hunt as Placido Flamingo, Additional Muppets
- Martin P. Robinson as Telly, Snuffy, Manolo, Additional Muppets
- Kevin Clash as Elmo and Hoots the Owl
- Pam Arciero as Grundgetta, Additional Muppets
- Camille Bonora as Female Drummer, Additional Muppets
- David Rudman as Male Drummer, Additional Muppets
- Noel MacNeal as Additional Muppets (uncredited)
- Fred Garbo Garver as Barkley, Additional Muppets
- Bryant Young as Additional Muppets
- Jim Henson as Ernie and Kermit the Frog

=== Special guest stars ===
- Carl Banks
- John Candy
- Celia Cruz
- Jane Curtin
- Danny DeVito
- Phil Donahue
- Keith Hernandez
- Mark Ingram II
- Jeremy Irons
- Gordon Jackson
- Madeline Kahn
- Gladys Knight
- Patti LaBelle (archival footage)
- Ladysmith Black Mambazo
- Sean Landeta
- Robert MacNeil
- Wynton Marsalis
- Jean Marsh
- Andrea Martin
- Ralph Nader
- Martina Navratilova
- Karl Nelson
- Seiji Ozawa
- Itzhak Perlman
- Rhea Perlman
- Paul Reubens
- Pete Seeger
- Paul Simon
- James Taylor (archival footage)
- Barbara Walters
- Joe Williams
- Mookie Wilson
