= Sesame Street's 50th Anniversary Celebration =

2019 TV Special

- Kermit the Frog rejoins his friends from Sesame Street in the special.
- Created by: Joan Ganz Cooney; Lloyd Morrisett; Jim Henson (Muppet characters)
- Written by: Christine Ferraro
- Directed by: Jack Jameson
- Starring: See list below
- Country of origin: United States
- Original language: English

Production
- Running time: 48 minutes
- Production company: Sesame Workshop

Original release
- Network: HBO; PBS tvN Movies
- Release: November 9, 2019 (HBO) November 17, 2019 (PBS) December 31, 2019 (tvN Movies)

Sesame Street's 50th Anniversary Celebration is a 2019 musical television special to celebrate the 50th anniversary of Sesame Street. Hosted by Joseph Gordon-Levitt, the special aired on November 9, 2019, on HBO, followed by a November 17 airing on PBS and December 31 on tvN Movies. It stars the cast and Muppets of Sesame Street, including Kermit the Frog, from the past and present. Many retired cast members and characters reunited on the street for the first time in years since their last appearances. This is the final Sesame Street special to feature long-time Muppet performer Caroll Spinney, who performed Big Bird and Oscar the Grouch for 50 years as well as the cast members Emilio Delgado and Bob McGrath, who played Luis and Bob, respectively, for 45 years.

== Plot ==
The special opens with Cookie Monster looking for directions to Sesame Street (and picking up cookies along the way). After a montage of various versions of the theme song, he arrives on Sesame Street with Joseph Gordon-Levitt who really wants to take a picture under the famous street sign but the trouble is it has gone missing. It is up to Elmo, Abby, Rosita and Grover to find it in time for the big photo while stopping Joseph from finding out. Meanwhile, Gonger is flying away on a balloon and Cookie Monster needs to get him back down for the party. Human cast members, Gordon, Susan, Bob, Gina, Luis, Maria, Linda, Leela and Miles return as Norah Jones sings "Welcome to the Party". Joseph takes a trip through Sesame Street history, bumping into some classic characters along the way, including Kermit the Frog (who sings "Bein' Green" with Elvis Costello).

Whoopi Goldberg, Patti LaBelle, Sterling K. Brown, Itzhak Perlman, Fran Brill, Caroll Spinney and Debra Spinney all arrive to celebrate while there are musical performances from Nile Rodgers, singing "The People in Your Neighborhood" with Ernie and Grover, Solange Knowles, singing "I Remember" with Elmo, Abby, Grover and Zoe, and Meghan Trainor, singing "Count Me In" with Elmo and Abby. Other highlights include a medley of Sesame Street songs, Sterling learning how to eat cookies like Cookie Monster and Whoopi and Itzhak helping Ernie "Put Down the Duckie". The special ends with a performance of "Sing" by the whole cast, led by Patti as it turns out Big Bird and Snuffy were decorating the street sign for the big party.

== Cast ==
=== Host ===
- Joseph Gordon-Levitt

=== Cast ===
- Alison Bartlett as Gina
- Linda Bove as Linda
- Emilio Delgado as Luis
- Olamide Faison as Miles
- Bill Irwin as Mr. Noodle
- Chris Knowings as Chris
- Loretta Long as Susan
- Sonia Manzano as Maria
- Bob McGrath as Bob
- Alan Muraoka as Alan
- Roscoe Orman as Gordon
- Nitya Vidyasagar as Leela
- Suki Lopez as Nina

=== Special guest stars ===
- Fran Brill - Herself
- Sterling K. Brown - Himself
- Elvis Costello - Himself
- Whoopi Goldberg - Herself
- Norah Jones - Herself
- Solange Knowles - Herself
- Patti LaBelle - Herself
- Itzhak Perlman - Himself
- Nile Rodgers - Himself
- Caroll Spinney - Himself
- Debra Spinney - Herself
- Meghan Trainor - Herself

=== Muppet Performers ===
- Pam Arciero as Goldilocks, Grundgetta
- Jennifer Barnhart as Gladys the Cow, Mama Bear, Zoe
- Tau Bennett
- Warrick Brownlow-Pike as Gonger
- Tyler Bunch as Dish, Letter A, Louie, Horatio the Elephant (puppeteer only)
- Leslie Carrara-Rudolph as Abby Cadabby
- Frankie Cordero as Rudy
- Stephanie D'Abruzzo as Pink Jacket, Little Bird, Prairie Dawn
- Ryan Dillon as Elmo, Don Music, Roosevelt Franklin (puppeteer only), Lefty the Salesman
- Stacey Gordon as Julia
- Christopher Thomas Hayes as Hoots the Owl
- Eric Jacobson as Bert, Grover, Oscar the Grouch, Guy Smiley, Harvey Kneeslapper, Two-Headed Monster (left head)
- John Kennedy as The Amazing Mumford
- Peter Linz as Ernie, Herry Monster, Captain Vegetable
- Spencer Lott
- Noel MacNeal as Letter C
- Paul McGinnis as Letter B
- Carmen Osbahr as Rosita, Ovejita, Spoon
- Martin P. Robinson as Mr. Snuffleupagus, Slimey the Worm (puppeteer only), Monty, Old MacDonald, Telly Monster
- David Rudman as Cookie Monster, Baby Bear, Humphrey, Letter Y, and Two-Headed Monster (right head)
- Matt Vogel as Big Bird, Count von Count, Kermit the Frog, Forgetful Jones, Mr. Johnson, Sherlock Hemlock

=== Voices ===
- Chris Knowings as Roosevelt Franklin
- Peter Linz as Horatio the Elephant
- Jerry Nelson as Frazzle (archival audio)
- Caroll Spinney as Taxi Driver
- Jim Henson as The Baker (archival audio)

== Songs ==
- "Can You Tell Me How to Get to Sesame Street?" (over a montage of various intros through the years)
- "Welcome (to the Party)" – Norah Jones, Big Bird, and the human cast
- "The People in Your Neighborhood" – Nile Rodgers, Grover, and Ernie
- "Bein' Green" – Elvis Costello and Kermit the Frog
- Medley: "I Love Trash", "ABC-DEF-GHI", "Elmo's Song", "One of These Things", "Rubber Duckie", "C Is For Cookie" – Joseph Gordon-Levitt, Susan, Bob, Oscar, Big Bird, Elmo, Ernie and Cookie Monster
- "I Remember" – Solange Knowles (featuring Elmo, Abby Cadabby, Grover, and Zoe)
- "Count Me In" – Meghan Trainor (featuring Elmo and Abby Cadabby)
- "Put Down the Duckie" – Hoots the Owl and Ernie with guest stars
- "Sing" – The cast and special guests
- "This is My Street" – Thomas Rhett and the cast (used during the end credits)

== Critical reception ==
Sesame Street's 50th Anniversary Celebration has received generally positive reviews from television critics and parents of young children. Nardine Saad of Los Angeles Times wrote, "A party-themed event hosted by Sesame Street fanboy Joseph Gordon-Levitt. It features the beloved colorful muppets and plenty of former cast members for the Count to count and cookies for Cookie Monster to devour. Several celebrities were also — briefly — on hand to talk shop or sing a song. Or seven." Sandra Gonzalez of CNN wrote, "Honors the moments that taught generations of children the building blocks of learning through song, stories and silliness." Mark Kennedy of Associated Press wrote, "Fifty years ago, beloved entertainer Carol Burnett appeared on the very first broadcast of a quirky TV program that featured a bunch of furry puppets." Lauren Messman of The New York Times wrote, "Now Sesame Street will take a trip down memory lane with a special anniversary celebration, hosted by Joseph Gordon-Levitt. The show will recreate iconic musical numbers, like "People in Your Neighborhood" and "It's Not Easy Being Green" with Kermit the Frog. Over the years, musicians like Johnny Cash and Destiny's Child have stopped by to sing on Sesame Street, and the anniversary will be no different, welcoming stars like Meghan Trainor, Patti LaBelle, Elvis Costello and Nile Rodgers to join the beloved characters for special segments and songs."
