= The Candy Apple News Company =

- Genre: Children's television
- Starring: Matt Robinson
- Country of origin: United States
- Original language: English

Original release
- Network: WCAU-TV, Channel 10 in Philadelphia, Pennsylvania

The Candy Apple News Company is a locally produced children's television series that premiered on Friday, February 2, 1979 at 8:00pm on WCAU-TV Channel 10 in Philadelphia, Pennsylvania. The premiere was rebroadcast the following Sunday at 8:00am, which remained the show's time slot for the rest of the season. It was rerun early on weekend mornings for many years until the final regular airing on September 7, 1991. Between 2006-2011 WCAU occasionally ran a show called Out of the Vault that featured Candy Apple News Company, although it's unknown how many episodes were shown.

In the show, a small human cast interacted with puppets in an old-fashioned, small-town storefront office which operated as a feature service distributing items of children's interest to television, radio and newspapers. The principal human cast member was Matt Robinson, who had previously played Gordon on Sesame Street., as the Editor-in-Chief. He was joined by his assistant C.B., played by Mary Margaret Myers, and a staff of puppets; a bat (Boris) worked as book reviewer, a mole (Morgan) was a researcher, and a cuckoo (Alistair) was the timekeeper. Other Candy Apple regulars included puppet Sparks O'Sullivan and a vintage 1930s talking radio that acted as show narrator. Each episode was an hour of skits, short educational films, and other produced pieces.

The mole, bat, and cuckoo puppets were first used a year earlier in the half-hour WCAU feature Yipe! Don't Be Afraid. They were built by George Neff, chairman of the art department at Glassboro State College in New Jersey.
