= Roosevelt Franklin =

Sesame Street Muppet character

- Sesame Street character
- The cover of Roosevelt Franklin's 1971 LP The Year of Roosevelt Franklin
- First appearance: 1970
- Last appearance: 1975
- Created by: Matt Robinson
- Voiced by: Matt Robinson, Chris Knowings
- Performed by: Frank Oz, Ryan Dillon

In-universe information
- Gender: Male

Roosevelt Franklin is a Muppet who was featured on the children's television series Sesame Street during the early 1970s.

== Fictional character biography ==
He is reddish-magenta with shaggy black hair that stands on end. His name is a play on the name of U.S. President Franklin Roosevelt, with the first and last names reversed. Sesame Street cast member Matt Robinson, who also played Gordon on the series for the first three seasons (1969–1972), created the character and provided his voice. Roosevelt is an intelligent boy who often speaks in rhyme or scat. Roosevelt began to appear less frequently in episodes created after the mid-1970s until he no longer was on the series. He then made a cameo nearly 5 decades later in Sesame Street's 50th Anniversary Celebration.

== Conception and racial element ==
Robert W. Morrow, author of "Sesame Street" and the Reform of Children's Television, wrote that "Franklin's sudden arrival may have been in response to early criticism of the show as too white."

Roosevelt Franklin usually appears in scenes with his mother, voiced by Loretta Long, who plays Susan on the series, and Roosevelt frequently recites poetry. Later scenes were set in a classroom at Roosevelt Franklin Elementary School, in which Roosevelt appears to fill in for an absent teacher while teaching lessons about up and down, high and low, loud and soft, here and there, good and bad luck, poison, Africa, rhyming words, trying and trying again, leaving other people's belongings alone, and street-crossing safety.

Jane O'Connor, the sole African-American woman in early Sesame Street planning discussions, said that Roosevelt Franklin was giving white children a stereotypical view of African-Americans. Teachers and staffers were also concerned that his rowdy behavior in class was setting a bad example for the pre-school audience. Eventually, the character was phased out of the show.

Franklin is featured on a 1971 record album titled The Year of Roosevelt Franklin, Gordon's Friend from Sesame Street, reissued in 1974 as My Name Is Roosevelt Franklin.
