= Imajin (album) =

Studio album by Imajin
- Released: October 26, 1999
- Recorded: 1998–1999
- Studio: The Hit Factory (New York, NY); Quad Recording Studios (New York, NY); Battery Studios (New York, NY); Da Underground (New York, NY); Planet Sound Studios (New York, NY); Soundtrack Studios (New York, NY); Power Play Studios (New York, NY); United Sound Systems (Detroit, MI); Double Phatt Studios
- Genre: R&B
- Length: 46:42
- Label: Jive
- Producer: Allstar; Deric "D-Dot" Angelettie; DeVante Swing; Eric Johnson; Larry "Rock" Campbell; Lova Boi; Manuel Seal; Mr. Price; Night & Day; Q-Pid; Ron "Amen-Ra" Lawrence; Timmy Allen

Singles from Imajin
- 1. "Shorty (You Keep Playin' with My Mind)" Released: 1998; 2. "No Doubt" Released: 1999; 3. "Flava" Released: 1999

Professional ratings
Review scores
Source	Rating
AllMusic	3/5 stars

Imajin is the only studio album by American R&B band of the same name. It was released on October 26, 1999, via Jive Records. Recording sessions took place at The Hit Factory, Quad Recording Studios, Battery Studios, Da Underground, Planet Sound Studios, Soundtrack Studios and Power Play Studios in New York City, at United Sound Systems in Detroit, and at Double Phatt Studios. Production was handled by Larry "Rock" Campbell, DeVante Swing, Mr. Price, Night & Day, Allen "Allstar" Gordon, Deric "D-Dot" Angelettie, Eric Johnson, Lova Boi, Manuel Seal, Christopher "Q-Pid" Jennings, Ron "Amen-Ra" Lawrence and Timmy Allen. It features a lone guest appearance from Keith Murray.

The album did not perform well on the music charts, reaching only number 44 on the US Billboard Heatseekers Albums chart. However, it produced three charted singles: "Shorty (You Keep Playin' with My Mind)", "No Doubt" and "Flava". Its lead single, "Shorty (You Keep Playin' with My Mind)", made it to number 25 on the Billboard Hot 100™, number 20 on the Hot R&B/Hip-Hop Songs, number 50 on the R&B/Hip-Hop Airplay, number 34 on the Rhythmic Airplay and number 18 on the Dance Singles Sales charts in the United States, number 22 on the UK singles chart, number 16 in New Zealand, number 64 in the Netherlands, and number 100 in Germany. The album's second single, "No Doubt", peaked at number 72 on the Hot R&B/Hip-Hop Songs, number 42 on the UK singles chart, and number 49 in New Zealand. The third single off of the album, "Flava", reached number 64 on the UK singles chart.

== Track listing ==
No.	Title	Writer(s)	Producer(s)	Length
1.	"Shorty (You Keep Playin' with My Mind)" (featuring Keith Murray)	Keith Murray; Deric Angelettie; Ronald Lawrence; Jack Knight; Norma Jean Wright; Peter Brown; Robert Rans	Deric "D-Dot" Angelettie; Ron "Amen-Ra" Lawrence	4:54
2.	"Keep It to Yourself"	Manuel Seal; Michael Clemons; Nate Clemons; Lorenzo Straight	Manuel Seal; Big Mike (co.); Nate Love (co.)	3:59
3.	"Flava"	Gasner Hughes; Tonyatta Martinez; Jolyon Skinner	Night & Day; Larry "Rock" Campbell	3:42
4.	"I'm Feelin' You"	Betram H. Price; Lionel Bussey	Mr. Price; Lova Boi	4:32
5.	"I Don't Wanna Play Basketball"	Donald Earle DeGrate, Jr.	DeVante Swing	4:25
6.	"Missing You"	Alex Cantrall; Darrin Christopher Jennings; Eric Donovan Johnson	Q-Pid; Eric Johnson	4:42
7.	"You're the Bomb"	Skinner; Timothy M. Allen; Larry Campbell	Timmy Allen; Larry "Rock" Campbell	3:56
8.	"No Doubt"	Allen Gordon Jr.; Cynthia Loving; Leroy M. Bell; Casey James	Allen "Allstar" Gordon	3:38
9.	"Love Letter"	Hughes; Martinez; Skinner	Night & Day; Larry "Rock" Campbell	4:05
10.	"Fresh"	DeGrate, Jr.	DeVante Swing	4:21
11.	"Ever Again"	Price; Bussey	Mr. Price	4:28
Total length:				46:42

Sample credits

- Track 1 contains a sample of "Dance With Me" written by Peter Brown and Robert Rans.
- Track 8 contains a sample from "It's A Natural Affair" written by LeRoy Bell and Casey James.

Outtakes

- "Always Been You" (4:39)
- "Something About Love" (4:21)
- "No Love" (4:13)
- "Ain't Too Proud To Beg For Your Love" (4:18)
- "Baby Girl" (2:31) (Later sold the rights to R&B group B2K)
- "I Never Dreamed You'd Leave Me in Summer" (3:25)
- "I Got What You Need" (5:45)

== Personnel ==
- Olamide Faison – vocals, guitar
- John Fitch – vocals, bass guitar
- Talib Kareem – vocals, keyboards
- Jamal Hampton – vocals, drums
- Keith Murray – rap vocals (track 1)
- Lionel "Lova Boi" Bussey – additional background vocals & producer (track 4)
- Donald "DeVante Swing" DeGrate Jr. – vocals (track 5), producer (tracks: 5, 10), arrangement (track 10)
- Alex Cantrall – background vocals (track 6)
- Darrin Christopher Jennings – background vocals, percussion, drum programming, producer (track 6)
- Jolyon Skinner – additional background vocals (track 7)
- Gasner Hughes – additional background vocals (track 7), producer & arrangement (tracks: 3, 9)
- Tonyatta Martinez – additional background vocals (track 7), producer & arrangement (tracks: 3, 9)
- Timothy M. "Timmy" Allen – additional background vocals, vocal arrangement, producer (track 7)
- Garrett "Blake Karrington" Smith – keyboards (track 1)
- Ronald Anthony "Amen-Ra" Lawrence – additional strings & producer (track 1)
- Jack Knight – arrangement (track 1)
- Deric "D-Dot" Angelettie – producer (track 1)
- Ben Garrison – recording (track 1)
- Joe Pirrera – recording (track 1)
- Eric Gast – recording (tracks: 1, 6)
- Michael Patterson – mixing (track 1)
- Nathan "Nate Love" Clemons – keyboards, drum programming, co-producer (track 2)
- Manuel Seal – producer (track 2)
- Michael "Big Mike" Clemons – co-producer (track 2)
- Ben Arrindell – recording & mixing (track 2)
- Larry "Rock" Campbell – producer (tracks: 3, 7, 9), arrangement (tracks: 3, 9)
- Tim Donovan – recording (tracks: 3, 7, 9), mixing (track 4)
- Chris Trevett – mixing (tracks: 3, 6, 7, 9), recording (tracks: 6, 7)
- Bert Price – producer, recording & mixing (tracks: 4, 11), arrangement (track 4)
- Ron Bowen – recording (track 4)
- Charles McCrorey – engineering assistant (tracks: 4, 7, 11)
- Mikael Ifversen – recording (tracks: 5, 10)
- Ricky Belt – mixing (track 5)
- Dave Puryear – engineering assistant (track 5)
- Randy Bowland – guitar (track 6)
- Eric Donovan Johnson – keyboards & producer (track 6)
- William Lockwood – percussion (track 6)
- Stephen George – mixing (track 7)
- Adam Cerda – engineering assistant (track 7)
- Daniel Wierup – engineering assistant (track 7)
- Cousin Wayne – re-mixing (track 7)
- Allen "AllStar" Gordon Jr. – producer & mixing (track 8)
- Angelo Quaglia – recording (track 8)
- Andy Blakelock – mixing (track 8)
- Lane Craven – mixing (track 10)
- Richard J. Tapper – engineering assistant (track 10)
- Paul Riser – arrangement (track 11)
- Chaz Harper – digital editing
- Tom Coyne – mastering
- Jacqueline Murphy – art direction
- Larry Busacca – photography
- Jason Claiborne – graphic design

== Charts ==
Chart (1999)	Peak position
US Heatseekers Albums (Billboard)	44
