= Holiday Rush =

2019 American Christmas comedy film

- Directed by: Leslie Small
- Written by: Sean Dwyer; Greg Cope White
- Produced by: Julie Crank Di Cataldo; Sean Dwyer; Elizabeth Cullen
- Starring: Romany Malco; Sonequa Martin-Green; Deon Cole; Amarr M. Wooten; La La Anthony; Alysia Livingston; Andrea-Marie Alphonse; Selena-Marie Alphonse; Roscoe Orman; Malika Samuel; Deysha Nelson; Tamala Jones; Darlene Love
- Cinematography: Keith L. Smith
- Edited by: Jamie Conklin
- Music by: Kathryn Bostic
- Production company: Poke Prod Production
- Distributed by: Netflix
- Release date: November 28, 2019
- Running time: 94 minutes
- Country: United States
- Language: English

Holiday Rush is a 2019 Christmas romantic comedy-drama film directed by Leslie Small and written by Sean Dwyer and Greg Cope White.

Popular radio DJ "Rush" Williams is forced to move in with his aunt, bringing his four spoiled children, while he and his producer Roxy work on a plan to get back on air.

It was released on November 28, 2019.

== Plot ==
Widowed hip-hop radio DJ Rashon "Rush" Williams has the top morning radio program on WMLE in Pittsburgh. Right after Thanksgiving, his producer Roxy reminds him to stick to the approved list of Christmas songs, as they are planning on proposing to become part owners of the station. However, Malcolm breaks it to them that CamCom, a national conglomerate, has bought the station.

Corporate VP Joss comes down to the radio station, announcing that not only are they going national, but Rush is being replaced with a female, pop DJ to match their new format. After confronting Malcolm, who informs them their next show will be their last. Rush laments outside with Roxy, who insists it will all work out somehow.

Rush goes home to his four children and Aunt Jo, where his eldest Jamal has been waiting to open Harvard's response to his application. His son and siblings rejoice over his acceptance. Rush confides in Jo that he has just been laid off and confesses he has no savings, as the kids have become accustomed to a privileged life.

Rush ends his last show on a sour note, so comes home to four sour pusses. His kids do nothing to raise his spirits, and he warns drastic changes are coming. Roxy suggests they buy WBQL, an old radio station where they used to work, as it has been off the air for some weeks, and has a 401K she can cash in. Aunt Jo hands over 45,000 in cash on the spot.

Forced to downsize, Rush sells the house to put in his part, and they move back into Aunt Jo's house, where they lived before he became successful and wealthy. Joss puts pressure on Malcolm to ensure advertisers to not buy advertising time from Rush and Roxy. Janella, one of the few who stayed on after WMLE's downsizing, criticises him for going along with the CamCom vice-president's orders.

Aunt Jo quickly tasks the kids with their part when meals are finished. Rush insists they pick a modest tree as a family. Roxy helps him get out the old decorations. In the boxes, they find a video of the kids' mom Paula, carrying a sleeping Jamal and pregnant with Mya. Jamal leaves in tears, but the girls join Rush and Jo to watch.

When advertisers pull out from WMLE's pressure, Rush suggests they place billboards announcing they will be commercial-free over Christmas, to fake it until they make it. At first praising Malcolm for successfully blocking advertising to WBQL, the CamCom goes through the roof upon seeing the billboard opposite WMLE. Janella quits on the spot.

The evening before Rush and Roxy are back on the air, over a romantic dinner they kiss and confess their mutual feelings. Returning to Jo's, they announce their relationship, which Mya and twins Evie and Gabby love. But Jamal, already angry about the hard changes and believing he will not be able to go to Harvard anymore, stomps off.

The next day, Jamal runs away from home. Rush finds him at his deceased mother's favorite location in a nearby park. Jamal expresses his discomfort living in their old house without his mother, as they moved out shortly after her passing. But, he comes to accept the new situation and his father's new relationship. Rush pledges to find a way to cover Harvard's tuition.

Rush finally manages to sell their large, expensive house by lowering the price, and Marshall from WMLE quits his job and invests in WBQL, enabling them to broadcast during the Christmas season and beyond.

== Cast ==
- Romany Malco as Rashon "Rush" Williams
- Sonequa Martin-Green as Roxy Richardson
- Deon Cole as Marshall Stone
- Amarr M. Wooten as Jamal Williams, Rush's son
- La La Anthony as Paula Williams, Rush's deceased Wife
- Alysia Livingston as Janella
- Andrea-Marie Alphonse as Evie Williams, Rush's second daughter and Gabby's twin sister
- Selena-Marie Alphonse as Gabby Williams, Rush's third daughter and Evie's twin sister
- Roscoe Orman as Reginald Miller
- Malika Samuel as Laurette
- Deysha Nelson as Mya Williams, Rush's first daughter
- Tamala Jones as Jocelyn "Joss" Hawkins
- Darlene Love as Auntie Jo Robinson
- Stormi Maya as Katrina
- Jimmy Palumbo as Daniels
- Chris Walker as Brett the Tree Guy
- Rocco Parente, Jr. as Salvatore Manducati

== Release ==
Holiday Rush was released on November 28, 2019.

== See also ==
- List of Christmas films
