= The Cookie Thief =

Sesame Street television special

A promotional image for the special.

The Cookie Thief is a 2015 Sesame Street special that aired on PBS Kids on February 16, 2015. The film is set in a new museum on Sesame Street, the Museum of Cookie Art and features Cookie Monster, who has to deal with suspicion that he is eating all of the museum's exhibits. Rachel Dratch stars in this special as an unnamed security guard in pursuit of Cookie Monster.

This was one of Fran Brill's final works before she retired from puppeteer work. As of 2016, and the following season, Stephanie D'Abruzzo will be the primary puppeteer for Prairie Dawn and Jennifer Barnhart will be the primary puppeteer for Zoe.

== Synopsis ==
A new museum, the Museum of Cookie Art, has opened on Sesame Street and Cookie Monster has decided to attend with his friends Chris and Elmo where Prairie Dawn is working there as a tour guide. Upon seeing the art, which parodies art masterpieces such as da Vinci's Mona Lisa, Van Gogh's The Potato Eaters and Munch's The Scream Cookie Monster wants to eat everything he sees, prompting Chris to remind him that he can only look at it and not eat it. Even a female security guard (Rachel Dratch) tends to catch him almost committing the acts. However, when the cookie paintings start disappearing, the female security guard and the Penguin security guards believe that Cookie Monster is the thief. Elmo decides to take on the role of detective to figure out who stole them. He finds a trail of cookie crumbs, butter, and chocolate chips, which he correctly guesses proves the thief to be an anthropomorphic chocolate chip cookie. The trio tries to tell the guards, who do not believe them and throw them out of the museum.

Once outside, they manage to contact Abby Cadabby who magically transforms them into a painting. She then takes the painting to the museum, where it is displayed and then stolen by the Cookie Thief. They then change back to their normal forms and, along with the museum's guards who now believe in Cookie Monster's innocence, chase the thief.

Upon capture, the Cookie Thief confesses to his crimes, which he explains he only did because of his love for cookie art. Cookie explains that while he understands his motivations, that if he stole the paintings then no one else could enjoy the artwork. He then tells the Cookie Thief that he can create his own cookie art and have it displayed in the museum, which the thief does.

== Cast ==
- Chris Knowings – Chris Robinson
- Rachel Dratch – Security guard

=== Muppet performers ===
- Fran Brill – Prairie Dawn
- Tyler Bunch – Vincent van Dough
- Leslie Carrara-Rudolph – Abby Cadabby
- Stephanie D'Abruzzo – Muncha Lisa, Penguin Security Guard
- Ryan Dillon – Elmo
- Eric Jacobson – Grover, Penguin Security Guard
- Peter Linz – Chewie the Cookie
- Joey Mazzarino – Leonardo da Crunchy, The Cream
- Martin P. Robinson – Edvard Munch
- David Rudman – Cookie Monster
- Matt Vogel – Little Cookie, Penguin Security Guard

== Reception ==
The A.V. Club graded the special a "C" rating, criticizing it for its flimsy plot and commenting that it was a lackluster special.

== See also ==
- Don't Eat the Pictures, a 1983 special also featuring Cookie Monster
