= Shorty (You Keep Playin' with My Mind) =

Single by Imajin featuring Keith Murray

from the album Imajin
- Released: 1998
- Genre: R&B, hip hop
- Length: 4:54 (Album version); 4:30 (Single version); 4:12 (No rap edit)
- Label: Jive
- Songwriters: D-Dot Angelettie, Peter Brown, Jack Knight, Ron Lawrence, Keith Murray, Robert Rans, Norma Jean Wright

Imajin singles chronology
"Shorty (You Keep Playin' with My Mind)" (1998)	"No Doubt" (1998)

Keith Murray singles chronology
"Independence Day" (1998)	"Shorty (You Keep Playin' with My Mind)" (1998)	"Incredible" (1998)

"Shorty (You Keep Playin' with My Mind)" is the debut single from R&B group Imajin and features a rap from Keith Murray. It peaked at number 25 on the Billboard Hot 100 and number 20 on the Hot R&B/Hip-Hop Songs chart in 1998. The song contains a sample of "Dance With Me" by Peter Brown.

== Weekly charts ==
Chart (1998)	Peak position
Australia (ARIA Charts)	75
Germany (GfK)	100
Netherlands (Dutch Top 40 Tipparade)	9
Netherlands (Single Top 100)	64
New Zealand (Recorded Music NZ)	16
Scottish Singles Sales (Official Charts)	57
UK Singles (Official Charts)	22
UK Hip Hop/R&B (Official Charts)	6
UK Indie (Official Charts)	2
US Billboard Hot 100	25
US Dance Singles Sales (Billboard)	18
US Hot R&B/Hip-Hop Songs (Billboard)	20
US Rhythmic Airplay (Billboard)	34

=== Year-end charts ===
Chart (1998)	Position
UK Urban (Music Week)	37
