= Loretta Long =

American actress (born 1938)

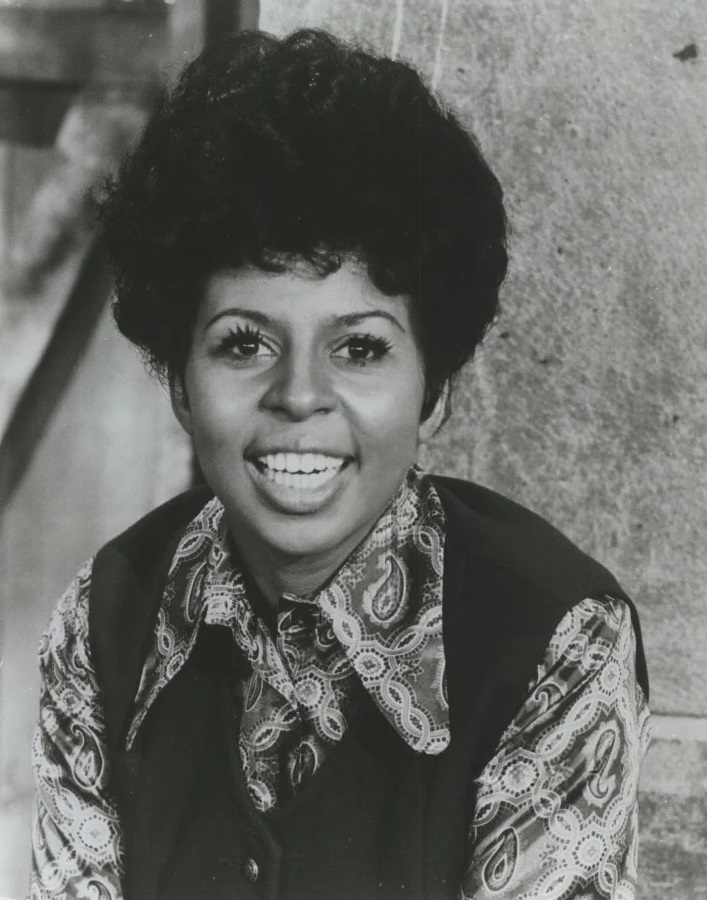
- Long in Sesame Street (1974)
- Born: Loretta Mae Moore; October 4, 1938 (age 88); Paw Paw, Michigan, U.S.
- Education: BA, Western Michigan University, 1960 Ph.D., University of Massachusetts Amherst, 1973
- Occupations: Actress, public consultant, educator
- Years active: 1967–present

Loretta Mae Long (née Moore; born October 4, 1938) is an American actress. She played the character of Susan Robinson on Sesame Street from 1969 to 2016. Long is also a consultant and public speaker on issues of multiculturalism and education.

== Career ==
Long earned her Ph.D. in urban education in 1973 from the University of Massachusetts, Amherst while she was starring on Sesame Street. She has acted in musicals (such as Guys and Dolls) and appeared on the Flip Wilson Show with other Sesame Street cast members during its first season. In the early years, she voiced a few female Muppet characters, including Suzetta Something, Roosevelt Franklin's mother, one of the Anything Muppet backup singers in "Mahna Mahna", and other Muppets where a female voice was needed. Long is the only surviving non-puppeteer actor on Sesame Street from its first episode; Will Lee (Mr. Hooper) died in 1982, Matt Robinson (the original Gordon) left the show in 1972 and died in 2002, and Bob McGrath (Bob) left the show in 2016 and died in 2022.

Before Sesame Street, Long served as co-host of the WNET program Soul! a weekly music, cultural, social and artistic PBS program, from its premier broadcast on September 12, 1968 (when she co-hosted with Alvin Poussaint, the black Harvard psychologist) through December 5, 1968 (when she co-hosted with then-future Soul! sole co-host Ellis Haizlip). At the same time, Long also was a substitute teacher in New York City. She continued to substitute-teach during her early days working for Sesame Street, occasionally causing confusion for students who had watched her on Sesame Street before coming to school and then saw her in their classroom later that same morning.

=== Education ===
Long earned her Bachelor of Arts from Western Michigan University in 1960. Long commuted to the University of Massachusetts on her days off from Sesame Street to complete a Ph.D., awarded in 1973. Her dissertation, "'Sesame Street': A Space Age Approach to Education for Space Age Kids", examined the educational model used on Sesame Street.

=== Sesame Street ===
Long's main role on Sesame Street, until the character was phased out in 2016, was Susan, wife of Gordon Robinson. At the beginning of the first season, her character was a housewife; afterwards, her role expanded to that of being a nurse as well as the mother of adopted son Miles. Long lent her voice to various other Muppet segments on Sesame Street, particularly during the early seasons. On the 8th episode of the first season (1969), she was the voice of the mother Muppet in the song "Five People in My Family."

=== Music ===
She recorded Susan Sings Songs from Sesame Street (Scepter Records SPS-584) in 1970, including the "ABC Song" and "If You're Happy and You Know It". The album reached #86 on Billboard's Top LP's chart and was nominated for a Grammy Award in the category Best Recording for Children in 1971, ultimately losing to another Sesame Street recording.

In 1975, Long released a single under her own name on RCA Records called "Rainy Day Friend" with a B-side titled "July the 12th, 1939".

== Personal life ==
Long's father was a welder, and her mother was a cosmetics sales representative. On February 10, 2010, Long was struck by a car as she crossed Route 130 near her home in East Windsor, New Jersey, suffering head injuries as a result. She was listed in fair condition following the accident and made a full recovery.

== Filmography ==
Television
Year	Title	Role	Notes
1969–2016	Sesame Street	Susan Robinson; Roosevelt Franklin's Mother; Suzetta Something; One of the Anything Muppet backup singers in "Mah Nà Mah Nà"; Mother in "Five People in My Family"; Various other Muppet characters	
