= Roscoe Orman =

American actor and writer (born 1944)

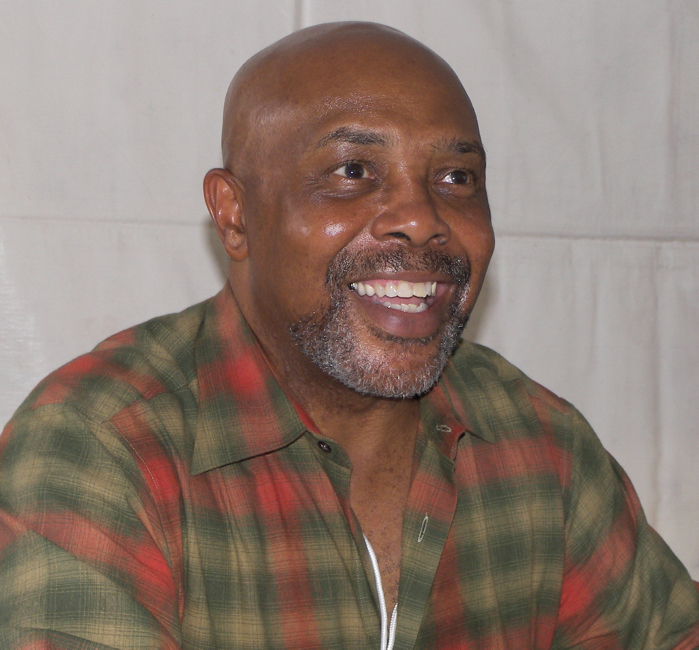
- Orman at the 2007 Texas Book Festival
- Born: Roscoe Hunter Orman; 11 June 1944 (age 82); The Bronx, New York, U.S.
- Other names: Roscoe H. Orman; Roscoe H Orman
- Education: High School of Art and Design
- Occupations: Actor; writer; artist; child advocate
- Years active: 1962–present
- Notable work: Sesame Street
- Spouse: Kimberley LaMarque Orman (m. 2012)
- Partner: Sharon Orman (1970–2010)
- Children: 4

Roscoe Hunter Orman (born June 11, 1944) is an American actor, writer, artist, and child advocate, best known for playing Gordon Robinson, one of the central human characters on Sesame Street.

== Early life and career ==
While a student at New York City's High School of Art and Design, Orman made his theatrical debut in the 1962 topical revue If We Grow Up. He was an early member of the Free Southern Theater in New Orleans for two years in the mid-1960s and a founding member of Robert Macbeth's New Lafayette Theatre in Harlem, NY, where he both acted in and directed several plays by NLT's playwright-in-residence, Ed Bullins. His many other stage appearances have included roles in "Julius Caesar" and "Coriolanus" at Joseph Papp's Public Theater, the Broadway production of August Wilson's Pulitzer Prize-winning play "Fences", Manhattan Theatre Club's stagings of Richard Wesley's "The Sirens", "The Last Street Play", and "The Talented Tenth", and Matt Robinson's one-man play The Confessions of Stepin Fetchit at the American Place Theatre. Orman is the recipient of two Audelco Theatre Awards and a five-time nominee.

He made his feature film debut in the title role of Universal Studios' 1973 drama Willie Dynamite and has since appeared in F/X, Striking Distance, New Jersey Drive, Sesame Street Presents: Follow That Bird, Twilight's Last Gleaming, The Adventures of Elmo in Grouchland, Jeremy Fink and the Meaning of Life, Holiday Rush, and You Can't Take My Daughter. His television credits include work on All My Children, Kojak, Sanford and Son, Cosby, Sex and the City, The Wire, Law & Order, and Law & Order: SVU. He appeared in the Garry Trudeau/Amazon streaming production Alpha House and the HBO mini-series The Night Of.

Orman joined the Sesame Street cast in 1974, becoming the third actor to play Gordon (after Matt Robinson, 1969–72, and Hal Miller, 1972–74).

In June 2006, Orman's memoir, Sesame Street Dad: Evolution of An Actor, was released. In September 2007, his children's book Ricky and Mobo was released.

On October 8, 2008, he became the Chief Storyteller of AudibleKids.com (a service of Audible.com), a website for parents, teachers, and children to connect with one another and download and listen to audiobooks on iPods, MP3 players, and computers. In this role, Orman narrates audiobooks and communicates with children, parents and teachers online and at events. His new role was announced at a community event at The Educational Alliance Boys & Girls Club in New York City, where Mayor Michael Bloomberg's office commended Orman's life work and willingness to embrace new technology to help encourage children to read books, by naming October 8, 2008, AudibleKids Day in New York City.

In 2016, his contract with Sesame Street was not renewed, as part of Sesame Workshop's retooling of the series, but the organization said that Orman would continue to represent it at public events. He returned to play Gordon in Sesame Street's 50th Anniversary Celebration along with a couple of YouTube videos released in 2018, a 2019 CNN town hall, Coming Together: Standing Up To Racism alongside former Sesame Street cast member Sonia Manzano, and a TV special released the same year, "The Power of We", also about racism. Roscoe Orman also returned as Gordon in a Season 54 and a Season 55 episode, thus becoming the first original human cast member to rejoin Sesame Street since Season 46.

== Personal life ==
Orman has four children with his former partner Sharon Orman, and is the grandfather of eight. His son Miles Orman played Gordon and Susan's adopted son Miles Robinson on Sesame Street from the mid-1980s to the early 1990s. He and his wife, Kimberley LaMarque Orman, reside in New Jersey.

== Filmography ==
=== Film ===
Film credits
Year	Title	Role	Notes
1973	Willie Dynamite	Willie	
1976	All My Children	Tyrone	
1979	Julius Caesar	Marcus Brutus	Direct-to-video
1979	Coriolanus	Adrian	Direct-to-video
1985	Sesame Street Presents: Follow That Bird	Gordon Robinson	
1986	F/X	Captain Wallenger	
1993	Striking Distance	Sid, Eddie Eiler's Partner	
1995	New Jersey Drive	Judge	
1996	Elmo Saves Christmas	Gordon Robinson	Direct-to-video
1997	Drive by: A Love Story	Pops	Short film
1999	The Adventures of Elmo in Grouchland	Gordon Robinson	
2007	Coney Island	Boss	Short film
2008	Compliments of the Serpent	Mike Stanton	Short
2011	Jeremy Fink and the Meaning of Life	Dr. Grady	
2018	All These Small Moments	Dr. Rogers	
2019	Holiday Rush	Reginald Miller	

=== Television ===
Television credits
Year	Title	Role	Notes
1974–2016; 2023–present	Sesame Street	Gordon Robinson	
1977	Kojak	Lieutenant Connors	Episode: "The Condemned"
1977	Insight	Body Guard	Episode: "Leroy"
1978	Christmas Eve on Sesame Street	Gordon Robinson	Television film
1983	Don't Eat the Pictures: Sesame Street at the Metropolitan Museum of Art	Gordon Robinson	Television film
1989	A Man Called Hawk	Malcolm	Episode: "Hear No Evil"
1989	Hard Time on Planet Earth	Captain Ralston	Episode: "Stranger in a Strange Land"
1991	Big Bird's Birthday or Let Me Eat Cake	Gordon Robinson	Television film
1993	Sesame Street Stays Up Late!	Gordon Robinson	Television film
1998	Elmopalooza!	Gordon Robinson	Television film
1999	Cosby	Mr. Mason	Episode: "Book 'Em, Griff O"
2000	Lifeline	Narrator (voice)	Episode: "D.C. Children's Hospital"
2001–2004	Law & Order	Mr. Cameron, Trial Judge Alan Kiley	2 episodes
2002	Sex and the City	Train Waiter	Episode: "The Big Journey"
2006	30 Days	Jo Jo	1 episode
2008	The Wire	Officer Oscar Requer	2 episodes
2008–2013	Law & Order: Special Victims Unit	Jerome Howard, Bryant Davis	2 episodes
2012–2013	Little Children, Big Challenges	Gordon Robinson	2 episodes
2013	Alpha House	Randall	Episode: "Hippo Issues"
2016	The Night Of	Jury Foreman	Episode: "The Call of the Wild"
2018	Blue Bloods	Ethan Goodwin	Episode: "Second Chances"
2018	New Amsterdam	Rodger Conway	Episode: "Three Dots"
2020	You Can't Take My Daughter	McDevitt	Television film

== Stage credits ==
Year	Title	Role(s)	Venue(s)	Notes	Ref.
1962	If We Grow Up				
2010	The Last Fall	Neville	Crossroads Theatre		
2010	Driving Miss Daisy	Hoke	Fulton Theatre (PA)		
2012	Jitney	Jim	Theatre Morgan		
2014	Fetch Clay, Make Man	Stepin Fetchit	Round House Theatre		
2014	The Fabulous Miss Marie	Bill	New Federal Theatre		
2017	Bud, Not Buddy	Jimmy, etc.	Kennedy Center		
