= The Robinson family (Sesame Street) =

Fictional characters

- Sesame Street family
- First appearance: Sesame Street Test Show 1 (July 21, 1969)
Family members
- Gordon Robinson; Susan Robinson; Miles Robinson; Olivia Robinson; Chris Robinson

The Robinson family is a fictional family in the children's television series Sesame Street. The family originally consisted of high school science teacher Gordon and his wife, Susan, a nurse. Later, the family expanded to include their adopted son, Miles, as well as Gordon's sister, Olivia, and his father, Mr. Robinson. Gordon's nephew, Chris Robinson, is the only remaining member of the family, and is currently one of the only human characters on Sesame Street. As African Americans, the family was created as leads for the show, originally targeted to underprivileged inner city children. Even as human roles were slowly reduced over the years, their characters maintained a constant presence.

== Character and production history ==
=== Inception ===
Gordon Robinson
- Sesame Street character
- First appearance: Sesame Street Test Show 1 (July 21, 1969)
- Portrayed by: Garrett Saunders (pilot episodes, 1969); Matt Robinson (1969–1972); Hal Miller (1972–1974); Roscoe Orman (1974–2016, 2023–present)

In-universe information
- Gender: male

Susan Robinson
- Sesame Street character
- First appearance: Sesame Street Test Show 1 (July 21, 1969)
- Last appearance: Sesame Street's 50th Anniversary Celebration (November 9, 2019)
- Portrayed by: Loretta Long

In-universe information
- Gender: female

Miles Robinson
- Sesame Street character
- First appearance: Adoption of Miles, part 2
- Last appearance: The Help-O-Bots
- Portrayed by: Miles Orman (1985–1995); Imani Patterson (1995–2002); Olamide Faison (2003–2008)

In-universe information
- Gender: male

Olivia Robinson
- Sesame Street character
- First appearance: Olivia comes to visit her brother Gordon
- Last appearance: Gina writes the Hooper's Store menu
- Portrayed by: Alaina Reed Hall

In-universe information
- Gender: female

Chris Robinson
- Sesame Street character
- First appearance: Chris looks for a job (August 14, 2007)
- Portrayed by: Chris Knowings

In-universe information
- Gender: male

Sesame Street was created, through private and federal grants, as a television series to "give the disadvantaged child a fair chance at the beginning," as co-creator Joan Ganz Cooney wrote in the 1967 study The Potential Uses of Television in Preschool Education.

Especially before the inclusion of the Muppets in Street scenes, Sesame Street was centered on Gordon and Susan. As per suggested by Harvard psychologist Jerome Kagan, Cooney advised in The Potential Uses that a series should feature a male lead, to "provide continuity from one segment to another, establish the tone, and function, subtly, as the master teacher." A male teacher would both encourage kids to emulate an intelligent adult, and "defeminize the early learning atmosphere." The decision to create such a character was backed up by research in the US government study The Negro Family: The Case for National Action. Known better as the Moynihan report, Assistant Secretary of Labor Daniel Patrick Moynihan suggested "the Negro community has been forced into a matriarchal structure which, because it is so out of line with the rest of the American society, seriously retards the progress of the group as a whole." His report suggested that, after the slavery-era of US history, the rise of out-of-wedlock births, absent fathers, and female-headed families only perpetuated cyclical poverty.

In his memoirs, Roscoe Orman who portrays Gordon Robinson commented that "what the character most significantly symbolizes, his most distinguishing and praiseworthy attribute, may lie in the simple fact that he is a man of African descent who for over three decades has been a respected and beloved father figure to young people of all races and all social classes all across America and beyond." He continues to say that while "born in a country that was founded and has continued to thrive upon the subjugation of his ancestors, he harbors no hatred or thirst for revenge but, on the contrary, is a model of patience, understanding, and civic responsibility who embraces all of humankind."

Orman went on to describe his on-screen wife, Susan, as an "exemplary model of African-American womanhood" and the couple's on-going relationship "in sharp contrast to the prevailing images of black men that have been projected within mainstream American culture since and especially prior to Sesame Street’s premiere and certainly during the formative years of my own generation."

Feminists objected to the character of Susan because they felt she fulfilled stereotypes they were against, that of a stay-at-home wife. Historian Robert W. Morrow defends her creators, stating that their goal was presenting Gordon as a strong black male capable of supporting his family. Sesame Street's producers responded to this criticism by making Susan a nurse during the show's second season, and by introducing Gordon's sister, Olivia, in 1976.

=== Casting ===
Actors were selected for the roles of Gordon, Susan, Bob, and Mr. Hooper by an audience of children who had watched videotaped performances. While some shows replace actors appearing in pilot episodes due to audience involvement, casting control this early on was and is unusual. In a series of test pilots, Garrett Saunders played Gordon; records of his appearance were lost by producers, and his identity was unknown until his family identified him in 2011.

Matt Robinson had joined Children's Television Workshop to assist in the development of Sesame Street, producing and overseeing filmed segments focusing on the diversity of different characters on the show. Robinson was eventually chosen to play the fictional character of Gordon in the series, after the performance of the character by Saunders in test episodes did not work out as the producers hoped. Gordon was the first character with spoken lines in the show, as a result of difficulty in finding someone to fill the figure. This was against his original intentions with joining the show as he preferred a behind-the-scenes role, and was initially reluctant to take the part. Dolores Robinson commented on his backseat role on the set with, "He was by nature shy, and he knew that they were having a difficult time casting Gordon. And the people overseeing the taping up in the booth, peering at the monitors, kept saying, ‘Matt knows what to do. He should be the Gordon.’" He ultimately resigned from the role in 1972.

In early episodes, it was often Gordon introducing and concluding the program.

Loretta Long was chosen to play the lead role of Susan. Her prior experience included hosting Soul!, a variety series on NET (later PBS). Initially, she was a supply teacher for schools in the Bronx area, which reportedly surprised and confused many young students. Long earned her doctorate in Urban Education in 1973 from the University of Massachusetts Amherst, during the show's fourth season. Because she had grown up on a farm in Michigan, the show's writers established that Susan had as well.

=== 1969–1971 ===
Sesame Street’s first episode centers on Gordon taking a girl named Sally around Sesame Street, to get acquainted with everyone and everything in her new neighborhood.

==== Susan gets a job ====
From its inception, Sesame Street has been highly scrutinized by critics of all kinds. While it was specially conceived to represent racial harmony, as suggested by followers of Dr. King, the "second-wave" feminist movement had not yet risen to prominence. Cynthia Eaton and Susan Chase of the National Organization for Women studied the series, in particular male and female interaction. It insisted that the program marginalized women and their role in society.

"After they presented their observations and concerns about our institutionalizing stereotypes, Jon Stone said, 'Well, let's give Susan a career.'" He was the primary director for the show. She became a public health nurse, who would run immunization clinics on Sesame Street. Gordon also was regularly shown helping her with household chores. Long recalled to Cooney in 1976 that, "I was too nice at the beginning, the great dispenser of milk and cookies." Some feminists still referred to her as "a hapless, hopelessly vague mother", even after the change.

Even with the addition of Sonia Manzano as the young, single woman Maria in the third season, critics still chided "All in all, Sesame Street has changed, from being incredibly sexist to being slightly less sexist" This view was helped by characters like Betty Lou, "a simpering, querulous little girl with pigtails and a squeaky voice".

==== Hip Muppet deemed stereotype ====
Matt Robinson was, however, the voice of Roosevelt Franklin, a purple Muppet meant to represent an African American boy. While the skits with the character musically provided reading and writing concepts, critics found his jive-talking to be a cultural stereotype, and the producers of the series removed him. Roscoe Orman provided the voice of one of Roosevelt's classmates, Hardhat Henry Harris, before joining the series as the third actor to play Gordon. The Roosevelt Franklin Muppet occasionally turned up in multi-Muppet musical routines such as "Clap, Clap, Clap" and the Canadian edition of Sesame Street continued to air the Franklin segments well into the early 1980s.

=== 1972–1974 ===
Miller as Gordon, with Long as Susan and Caroll Spinney as Oscar the Grouch. Undated publicity photo, likely from 1972.

Hal Miller became Gordon for a brief stretch, 1972 to 1974. Unlike Matt Robinson, Miller didn't sport a moustache, and he was slightly heavier set. Miller described his work on the show, saying, "I feel the program offers a spontaneous position to be in. You don't create a role; it's what you are as a person that defines it."

=== 1974–2016, 2023–present ===
Roscoe Orman became the third Gordon in 1974, a role he kept until 2016. He later returned to this role in 2023. "The kids who were on the show that first season would not accept me as Gordon," Orman remarked. "One day there's Hal [Miller] as Gordon and the next day there's this new guy who says he's Gordon...the kids, both on the show and at home...they just assume that we are that person we're playing."

==== Adopting Miles ====
In 1985, Orman and his wife were about to have their second child together; Big Bird puppeteer Caroll Spinney mentioned this to his wife, Debra. They went to producer Dulcy Singer, suggesting that Gordon and Susan should have a child on the show. It was decided that they would adopt, instead of Susan being pregnant, and that Orman's newborn son Miles would take the role. It was revealed that Susan had been trying to become pregnant, but to no avail due to infertility. At age seven, the younger Orman quit the series and was replaced by child actor Imani Patterson.

Before the series of episodes where Miles is adopted, Gordon and Susan lacked last names. "Robinson", named after original Gordon actor, Matt Robinson, was shown as Miles' last name on his adoption certificate. Alternatively, Roscoe Orman has suggested that the name was revealed in a different storyline aired in 1991, involving Gordon teaching in the classroom. Writers felt that the students couldn't address their teacher as "Gordon", so Orman suggested "Mr. Robinson".

Similarly, Mr. Hooper's first name was only revealed on his GED, Bob Johnson's last name went unrevealed for years, and Gina Jefferson's last name first appeared on the door of her new veterinary practice in 2002.

==== Trash Gordon ====
Roscoe Orman has garnered more screen time since season 35, playing Trash Gordon, the hero of a series of bedtime stories Oscar the Grouch reads to Slimey the Worm at the end of each episode. Based on Flash Gordon, Trash is an intergalactic traveller who encounters odd creatures on each planet he visits. He escapes peril in each chapter, thanks to his quick thinking; when a living pile of rotten bananas confronts him, for example, it is soon chased away by an "Intergalactical Monkey" he happened to have with him.

==== Recent appearances ====
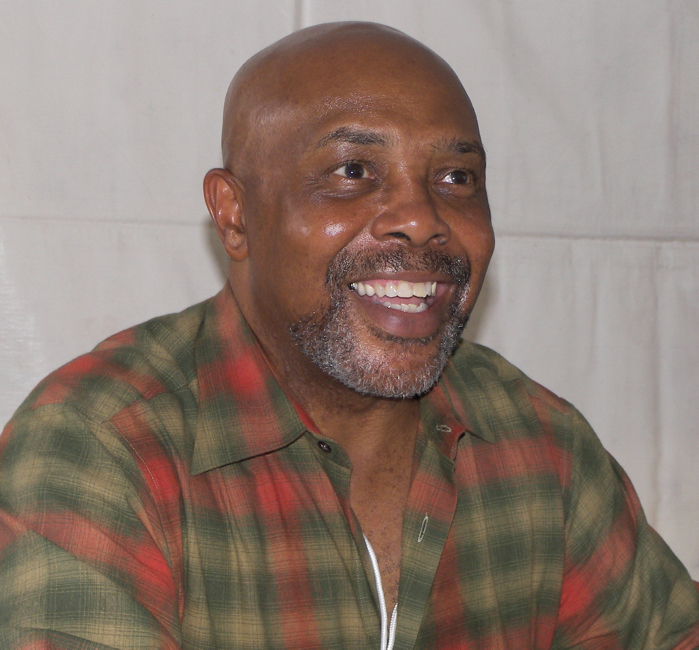
Roscoe Orman played Gordon from 1974 to 2016. He is seen here at the 2007 Texas Book Festival in Austin, Texas.

Looking back on his role, over the last 33 years, Orman commented, "If I could boast of no other major career accomplishment, having played a central role as I have in the development and continuation of this landmark series would alone have made my life sufficiently meaningful. The historical significance of Sesame Street and its surprising longevity have made my association with the show, in many regards, my life's crowning achievement." However, Orman doesn't credit Sesame Street as having defined himself personally and his overall career; The Free Southern Theater of New Orleans and The New Lafayette Theatre of Harlem collectively take that honor.

By 2002, Imani Patterson left his role as Miles and was replaced by actor Olamide Faison. As a recording artist of the mildly successful hip-hop group Imajin, Faison could be used more frequently as a singer on the series. Plot lines like season 36 episode 4089 focused on Miles singing numerous 1960s-style parody songs for American Fruitstand.

In episode 4112 (2006), Miles graduated from high school alongside Gabi, despite the fact that the characters' respective births on the show occurred four years apart. A flashback in this episode also revealed that Miles was shy on his first day of school.

Loretta Long is the last surviving non-puppeteer actor on Sesame Street from its first episode, as Matt Robinson (Gordon for the first three seasons) left the show in 1972 and died in 2002, Will Lee (Mr. Hooper) died in 1982, and Bob McGrath left the show in 2016 and died in 2022. While none of the actors have appeared in a significant number of episodes since about season 38, the longevity of their roles are with few precedents. Of the Muppets from the first episode—Big Bird, Oscar the Grouch, Kermit the Frog, Cookie Monster, and Bert and Ernie—all except Kermit are still major characters on the show. However, Jim Henson (Kermit and Ernie) died, with Steve Whitmire playing Ernie from 1993 to 2014, followed by Billy Barkhurst from 2014 to 2017, and then Peter Linz since 2017 (Kermit no longer appears); Frank Oz, busy as a director, puppeteered Grover, Bert, and Cookie Monster occasionally until 2012 (Eric Jacobson and David Rudman have largely taken over his respective characters); and Caroll Spinney retired in 2018 and died in 2019, thus handing over the role of Big Bird to Matt Vogel, and Oscar the Grouch to Jacobson.

On July 28, 2016, it was announced that Gordon (along with Bob and Luis) would be dropped from the show as Orman, McGrath, and Delgado's contracts were not renewed as part of Sesame Workshop's re-tooling for the series. Following Orman, McGrath, and Delgado's departures, the workshop stated that they would continue to represent them at public events.

Gordon made a more featured return appearance on the series proper in Episode 5401 (a Season 54 episode) and Episode 5511 (a Season 55 episode). He is the first original Sesame Street human character to resurface in new material on the show itself since Season 46. However, some of the former cast members also appeared in Sesame Street's 50th Anniversary Celebration, online videos, and town halls the show had produced in the years in between then.

=== Birthdays ===
Since Sesame Street Magazine published calendars in every issue, character birthdays were established. Gordon's is February 23, Susan's is May 3, and Miles' is December 4. Gordon's brother Stevie was born on October 20.

== Relatives ==
Kevin Clash as Adult Miles on episode 2313.

Susan's parents' first appearance on the series.

Writers introduced the character of Gordon's sister, Olivia, played by actress Alaina Reed Hall, in 1976 to show a relationship between adult siblings. Olivia was a photographer and last appeared on the show in 1988 (so Reed could work on the TV sitcom 227), although the television special The Street We Live On included archive footage of her. She died of breast cancer on December 17, 2009, at the age of 63.

In episode 4067 (season 35), Carl Gordon played Gordon's father, Mr. Robinson.

Kevin Clash played an adult version of Miles in episode 2313. In this episode, he has a son.

In one episode, c. 1975, Susan leaves the Street for a day to visit her mother, who has taken ill, in Merton, which according to Gordon, is a few hours away by plane and a short train ride after landing.

Susan's parents, Lee (Bill Cobbs) and Dorothy (Frances Foster), were seen in episode 2125 (season 17), in which they visited her and Gordon after they adopted Miles. They revisited in episode 2226 (season 18) in which Gordon and Susan threw a party to celebrate the one-year anniversary of Miles' adoption, in which the event was reenacted with Big Bird as Gordon, Snuffy as Susan, and Elmo as the adoption agent. Lee and Dorothy came back for another visit in episode 2820 (season 22), in which the short-lived character Preston Rabbit, was also a guest at the Robinson's apartment.

In episode 3578 (season 28), Gordon's parents, Bill (Helmar Augustus Cooper) and Sarah (Theresa Merritt), had come over for their 45th wedding anniversary party. Other relatives of Gordon's invited to the party include his brother Aaron (also played by Kevin Clash), his wife Pearl (Pamela Isaacs), and his two children, Wayne (Devon Mack) and Alanna (Ife Tiye Collymore), Cousin Leon (Akwesi Asante), and his three daughters, Alison (Nicole A. Davis), Carla (Carla A. Davis) and Baby Selina (Alljahni Mack).

Added to the show in 2007 was Gordon and Susan's nephew, Chris Robinson, played by actor Chris Knowings. He is still a regular, working at Hooper's Store with Alan.

== Merchandise ==
Gordon, Susan, and Mr. Hooper were all turned into Little People toy figures in 1975, nearly the only toys ever created of the human characters of Sesame Street (a Mr. Noodle doll was created in the early 2000s). Gordon and Susan, as well as other humans on the series have been included in various books, particularly during the 1970s and 1980s.

During the early years, Susan often sang "One of These Things". She also headlined her own album, Susan Sings Songs from Sesame Street, and had minor roles in both Sesame Street movies.

Robinson and Long appeared in the original Sesame Street Live touring production, while Orman and Long make occasional appearances in and out of character. In the summer of 2005, Orman appeared as Gordon with Kevin Clash puppeteering Elmo at series sponsor Beaches Family Resorts in Jamaica.

Long speaks on various topics, including "Children's Education and the Dynamics of Television on the Education of Young Children", "Cultural Diversity: The Sesame Street Method", "Happy Birthday Sesame Street: A Twenty-Five-Year Retrospective", "Mother the First Teacher and Home the First School", "Sesame Street: The Second Generation", "Sesame Street: A Space-Age Approach to Education for Space-Aged Children", "Susan of Sesame Street Sing-Along", "The ABC's of African-American History", and "Why Didn't Someone Tell Me? A Talk About Teaching in the Inner City".

In his memoirs, Orman recalls a meet-and-greet in the mid-1980s, after performing for an audience of 500 in a Topeka, Kansas college auditorium. One little girl, who Orman estimates was aged seven or eight, approached him for a hug, a regular occurrence. He noticed her hug, wrapping around his neck, was "unusually ardent, [with an] almost desperate quality of…embrace". Orman later discovered that he was the first adult male she had been willing to approach, after being sexually abused by a family member, "some time ago".

Long has taught classes at Rowan University, including "The Sesame Street Approach to Elementary Education".

The original Gordon, Matt Robinson, died on 5 August 2002. As many fans didn't know there were two actors who previously portrayed Gordon before the current Roscoe Orman, and many didn't know his name, rumor spread that it was him who died. Hal Miller's post-Sesame career included three movie appearances and one production credit; only one of the roles was named. Miles Orman played basketball for the Marist College Red Foxes.

== See also ==
- Gordon: Matt Robinson, Hal Miller, Roscoe Orman
- Susan: Loretta Long
- Miles: Miles Orman, Imani Patterson, Olamide Faison
- Olivia: Alaina Reed Hall
- Chris: Chris Knowings
- Carl Gordon, Bill Cobbs, Frances Foster
