= Imajin =

American contemporary R&B group

- Origin: New York City, U.S.
- Genres: R&B
- Years active: 1998–2000
- Labels: Jive, Universal Motown, Iri, Circle
- Members: Talib Kareem; Olamide Faison; John "Jean Lephare" Fitch; Tony Royster Jr.
- Past members: Jamal "J Star" Hampton

Imajin was an American R&B boy band that is known for their hit "Shorty (You Keep Playing With My Mind)" with Keith Murray. The group also made a version of this song with Mr. Cheeks of the rap group The Lost Boyz. This single peaked at number 25 on the Billboard Hot 100, number 20 on Billboard's Hot R&B/Hip-Hop Songs chart and number 22 in the UK Singles Chart in 1998.

== Discography ==
=== Albums ===
Album information
Imajin
- Released: October 26, 1999
- Chart positions: –
- Last RIAA certification: –
- Label: Jive Records
Imajin: Unreleased Masters
- Released: 2005/2007
- Chart positions: –
- Label:IRI/Circle Entertainment / Imajin Recording Inc.

=== Singles ===
Year	Title	Chart positions				Album
Year	Title	U.S	U.S. R&B/Hip-Hop	AUS	UK	Album
1998	"Shorty (You Keep Playin' with My Mind)"	25	20	75	22	Imajin
1999	"No Doubt"	–	72	–	42	Imajin
2000	"Flava"	–	–	–	64	Imajin

Unreleased singles

- 2005 - "Are We Still In Love" [Album: Unreleased Masters]
- 2005 - "Can't Forget" (feat. The Game)

=== As featured artist ===
Year	Title	Chart positions			Album
Year	Title	U.S. Hot 100	U.S. R&B/Hip-Hop	UK Singles Chart	Album
1999	"Bounce, Rock, Skate, Roll": Baby DC featuring Imajin	-	-	45	School Dayz: Also released as single
1999	"Candy Girl": Baby DC featuring Imajin	-	-	-	School Dayz: Also released as single

=== Featured tracks ===
Year	Title	Album
1998	"No Love"	Def Jam's Rush Hour Soundtrack
1999	"Always Been You"	The PJs (soundtrack)
1999	"Love Letter"	The Wood (soundtrack)
1999	"Somethin' About Love"	In Too Deep (soundtrack)
2000	"YOU ARE THE ONE"	GENIUS 2000
