= Hal Miller (actor) =

American actor (1935–2017)

- Miller during a vacation in 2005
- Born: Harold Miller; August 25, 1935; New York City, U.S.
- Died: August 30, 2017 (aged 82); New York City, U.S.
- Occupations: Actor; painter; singer; lyricist; poet
- Years active: 1966–2017
- Spouse: Lynne Miller (m. 1966)
- Children: 2
- Website: HaroldMiller.com (archive)

Harold Miller (August 25, 1935 – August 30, 2017) was an American actor, painter, singer, lyricist and poet, who was the second actor to play Gordon Robinson on Sesame Street from 1972 to 1974, succeeding Matt Robinson.

== Career ==
Miller began his acting career in 1966 after he received his Actors' Equity Association card while working with Joseph Papp in Henry V and his Screen Actors Guild card in 1971 after being hired by Columbia Pictures. He appeared in the Lizzie Borden film Born in Flames and also in A Man Called Adam, as well as a Quinn Martin production in San Francisco. His other theatre credits includes Twelfth Night , Richard II and Narrow Road to the Deep North. He has also toured and appeared in a number of stage productions at the New York Shakespeare Festival. In 1971, he played the lead role in the stage play Purge.

In 1972, Miller was cast as Gordon on the children's television series Sesame Street, succeeding Matt Robinson. Miller described his work on the show, saying: "I feel the program offers a spontaneous position to be in. You don't create a role; it's what you are as a person that defines it."

He played the role until 1974 when he made the decision to leave the show for mainstream acting. He followed this direction making two major appearances on Law & Order. He also played a minor role in a commercial for Bristol Myers Squibb and played Captain Countdown in several Nickelodeon commercial bumpers from 1995 to 1996.

== Personal life and death ==
Miller was married to interior designer Lynne Miller. Together they have a son and a daughter. Their son Harold Miller Jr. appeared on Sesame Street with his father during the 1970s. In addition to acting, Miller was also a painter (represented by Saatchi), a singer, a lyricist, and a published poet.

As a singer, he recorded a song on an album for CBS Records.

In his spare time, Miller enjoyed traveling around the world performing and singing, extensively Europe, China, Paris, France, Germany, England, Ireland, Holland, Japan, Switzerland and India.

Miller died on August 30, 2017, at the age of 82.

== Selected filmography ==
=== Film ===
Film credits
Year	Title	Role	Notes
1966	A Man Called Adam	Minor role	
1975	If You Don't Stop It... You'll Go Blind!!!	Unknown role	
1975	Distance	Jesse Horne	
1983	Born in Flames	Cop at Precinct	

=== Television ===
Television credits
Year	Title	Role	Notes
1972–1974	Sesame Street	Gordon Robinson	19 episodes
1976	The Quest	Private Hayes	Episode: "The Seminole Negro Indian Scouts"
1992, 1996	Law & Order	Judge Cyrus Metcalfe, Marcus Tate	2 episodes; final roles

=== Commercials ===
Commercial credits
Year	Title	Role	Notes
1995–1996	Nickelodeon	Captain Countdown	

== Theatre ==
- Purge - Lead role
- Twelfth Night - Fabian
- Richard II - Lord Ross
- Narrow Road to the Deep North - Bosho Matsuo
