= Matt Robinson (actor) =

American actor, writer and producer (1937–2002)

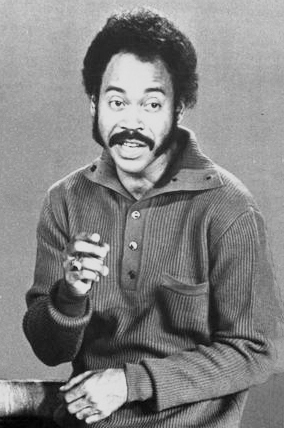
- Robinson in 1969 during the taping of Sesame Street segment "Consider Yourself".
- Born: Matthew Thomas Robinson Jr. January 1, 1937; Philadelphia, Pennsylvania, U.S.
- Died: August 5, 2002 (aged 65); Los Angeles, California, U.S.
- Occupations: Actor; writer; producer
- Years active: 1962–1993
- Known for: Gordon Robinson – Sesame Street
- Spouse: Dolores Robinson (m. 1960; div. 1991)
- Children: 2; including Holly Robinson

Matthew Thomas Robinson Jr. (January 1, 1937 – August 5, 2002) was an American actor, writer and television producer. Robinson was the first actor to portray the character of Gordon Robinson on the PBS children's TV program Sesame Street. When Sesame Street began in 1969, not only did Robinson play Gordon, but he also provided the voice of the puppet Roosevelt Franklin and was one of the show's producers. He left the show in 1972. In later years, when producers needed a last name for the Gordon character, then played by Hal Miller and later Roscoe Orman, they used Matt's last name.

He wrote and produced the films Save the Children and Amazing Grace in the early 1970s, and authored scripts for Sanford and Son and Eight Is Enough. In 1983, he joined the staff of The Cosby Show as a producer and staff writer. By that time, he was beginning to show symptoms of Parkinson's disease, but stayed with the show for seven seasons despite the difficulty. He ultimately died from the disease on August 5, 2002, in Los Angeles at the age of 65.

== Family, early life ==
Born Matthew Thomas Robinson Jr., in Philadelphia, Pennsylvania, to Matthew Robinson Sr. and Marie (née Henson) Robinson on January 1, 1937. His father worked as a postal worker and one of the first African American columnists for The Philadelphia Independent newspaper, while his mother worked as an elementary-school teacher.

Robinson attended West Philadelphia High School in Philadelphia, Pennsylvania, before going on to Pennsylvania State University in University Park, Pennsylvania, and graduating in 1958 with a degree from the College of the Liberal Arts and Sciences. While at Penn State, Robinson was elected president of the Penn State Omega Psi Phi fraternity, one of the first African American fraternities founded at a prominently African American college or university—Howard University in Washington, D.C.

== Career ==
In 1962, Robinson wrote a slave revolt drama titled Rained All Night.

He began his media career in 1963 as a writer, and soon after producer and on-air talent, at television station WCAU-TV in his hometown of Philadelphia. Robinson produced and hosted Opportunity in Philadelphia, a weekly televised employment service oriented toward African Americans. By televising job opportunities, Opportunity in Philadelphia sought to allay the apprehension many minorities felt when looking for work. Robinson established his talent at WCAU, ultimately leading to future successes as a producer and actor.

=== Sesame Street ===
Robinson's television breakthrough came in 1969 when he joined the Children's Television Workshop (CTW) to assist in the development of a new children's program for National Educational Television titled Sesame Street. His initial role was to produce and oversee filmed segments focusing on the diversity of different characters on the show. Robinson was eventually chosen to play the fictional character of Gordon in the series, after the performance of the character in test episodes by another actor, Garrett Saunders, did not work out as the producers had hoped. Gordon was the first character with spoken lines on the show, as a result of difficulty in finding someone to fill the figure. This was against Robinson's original intentions upon joining the show, as he preferred a behind-the-scenes role, and was initially reluctant to take the part. Dolores Robinson commented on his backseat role on the set: "He was by nature shy, and he knew that they were having a difficult time casting Gordon. And the people overseeing the taping up in the booth, peering at the monitors, kept saying, 'Matt knows what to do. He should be Gordon.'” Robinson remained with Sesame Street until 1972.

In total four actors have played Gordon. In addition to Robinson, Roscoe Orman, Garrett Saunders, and Hal Miller have filled the role. Each actor's tenure is not exactly clear with some sources citing Roscoe Orman beginning in 1974 and others in 1973. Later, when Gordon and Susan needed a surname, Robinson's was used in tribute.

Robinson wrote one of the first Sesame Street-themed storybooks in 1972, titled Gordon of Sesame Street's Storybook. It was composed of four of his originally written children stories, "No More Milk", "Fisher-Man", "Fire-Man," and "A Lot of Hot Water". The cover has a Gordon Robinson caricature reading to different children.

==== Roosevelt Franklin ====
While with CTW, Robinson also played the voice of a reddish-magenta puppet named Roosevelt Franklin. Robinson worked closely with Jim Henson to accurately design the character, the first black-influenced Muppet. Other minority-based Muppets created by Henson and Robinson were Baby Ray Francis, Mobley Mose and a Latino Muppet, A.B. Cito. Roosevelt Franklin promoted ideals such as family, pride, respect, and geography while also showing a passion for rhyming and blues music. By both creating the character and performing Franklin's voice for three seasons, Robinson helped his puppet become one of the show's main characters. In addition, Franklin continued to make appearances until 1975.

The puppet was pulled from the show because a negative perception of the character among African Americans began to grow. This resulted from Franklin's frequently unruly behavior at the fictional elementary school, which was deemed a bad example for the audience. Additional arguments for the character's departure were rooted in its overly excessive black image, or lack thereof. Dolores Robinson has stated that Roosevelt Franklin became a televised vehicle for her then-husband's anger with racism and pride in black people.

Robinson recorded and released the first Sesame Street album to be focused on a single character, The Year of Roosevelt Franklin (Gordon's Friend from Sesame Street). Released in 1971, and then re-released in 1974 under the name My Name is Roosevelt Franklin, the album dealt with many appropriate behaviors for children; aside from basic topics such as numbers and letters, it also touched on traffic safety, sharing and getting along with others. All tracks were co-written with the help of Joe Raposo. The album was again released on compact disc in 2010 as a part of a set titled Old School: Volume 2, also including "Grover Sings the Blues" and "The Count Counts".

=== Post-Sesame Street ===
Following his time with CTW, Robinson continued to produce and write for movies, television and the stage. He wrote and produced, under the direction of Stan Lathan, Save The Children (1973), a musical performance that was a spinoff of a black exposition conducted by People to Save Humanity. Robinson would continue his work as a producer and writer in the 1974 film Amazing Grace, which was about a group of neighbors seeking to overthrow some shady, money-hungry politicians.

After leaving Sesame Street, Robinson returned to Philadelphia and to WCAU-TV, where he starred on The Candy Apple News Company, a locally produced children's show where a small human cast interacted with puppets in a radio and newspaper office. Other post-Sesame Street work included writing episodes for Sanford and Son, The Waltons and Eight Is Enough, and writing and producing for CBS's children's series Captain Kangaroo.

=== The Cosby Show (1983–1990) ===
In 1983, Robinson joined the crew of NBC's The Cosby Show as a producer and writer. The family sitcom, which aired from 1984 for eight seasons until 1992, revolved around the life of the Huxtable family – an affluent African-American family in Brooklyn, New York. Robinson transitioned between writer, executive story consultant, executive story editor and soundtrack writer for over 50 episodes of the show, eventually becoming a co-producer. He acted in one episode, "Cliff's Nightmare", as a French scientist (coincidentally, this episode also featured cameos by the Muppets).

=== The Confessions of Stepin Fetchit (1993) ===
Written by Robinson and directed by Bill Lathan, The Confessions of Stepin Fetchit is a one-man play that focuses on Lincoln Perry, who was a popular black comic character in 1930s films but soon came under fire by civil rights advocates. The play was meant as a call to history as well as a discussion forum for reflection on Perry's life story as one of America's first black movie stars.

== Awards and honours ==
- Daytime Emmy Awards – 1983, nominated (along with Bob Brush, Harry Crossfield, Martin Donoff, and Howard Friedlander) for Outstanding Individual Achievement in Children's Programming-Writing for Captain Kangaroo
- Distinguished Alumnus Award from Penn State University (1994)
- 42nd NAACP Image Awards

== Personal life ==
Matt and his wife Dolores had two children, Matthew Thomas Robinson III and Holly Elizabeth Robinson (born September 18, 1964), before divorcing.

== Death ==
Robinson was diagnosed with Parkinson's disease in 1982 at the age of 45 and battled the disease for 20 years. In 1997, during her father's struggle with the disease, daughter Holly Robinson Peete and her husband, NFL quarterback Rodney Peete, started the HollyRod Foundation. The foundation was created to reach out to all those affected by Parkinson's disease or autism and provide medical, physical and emotional support. Located within the Center for Parkinson's Research and Movement Disorders at the Keck School of Medicine at the University of Southern California, the HollyRod Foundation is able to provide low or no-cost treatment as well as various services to the underserved in greater Los Angeles. His son Matt also developed Parkinson's.

Robinson died in his sleep at his Los Angeles home on Monday, August 5, 2002, at the age of 65. A memorial service was held on the morning of Friday, August 9, 2002, at The Writers Guild of America Theatre in Beverly Hills, California. He is survived by daughter and actress Holly Robinson Peete, son and production assistant Matthew Robinson III, former spouse Dolores Robinson and five grandchildren.
