= Chris Knowings =

American actor (born 1980)

- Born: Christopher Lawrence Knowings; February 25, 1980 (age 46)
- Occupation: Actor
- Years active: 1994–present
- Known for: Taina; Sesame Street
- Relatives: Christy Knowings (twin sister)

Christopher Lawrence Knowings (born February 25, 1980) is an American actor. He is best known for playing Lamar Carlos Johnson in the short-lived Nickelodeon series Taina and Chris Robinson on Sesame Street.

== Career ==
Knowings began his acting career at age 13 when he appeared in Crooklyn from Spike Lee in 1994 as Nate Carmichael, one of the main characters of the film. He portrayed Lamar Johnson in the 2001 Nickelodeon series, Taina. Other TV credits include guest appearances on Law & Order, New York Undercover, and 100 Centre Street. He also appeared in an AT&T wireless phone commercial in December 2002.

He is best known for joining the cast of Sesame Street in Season 38 in August 2007 as Chris Robinson. Knowings has additionally performed voice roles on Sesame Street, including the off-screen narrator of some Two-Headed Monster sketches.

== Filmography ==
- Nature Cat (2018–2024) TV Series .... Ronald (voice) (Seasons 2–5)
- Kevin Can Wait (2018) TV series .... Omar (1 episode)
- The Cookie Thief (2015) TV special .... Chris Robinson
- Sesame Street (2007–present) TV series .... Chris Robinson
- LazyTown (5 episodes/2007) TV Series....Pixel
- Generation Jets (2003) TV series .... XL's Brother (voice)
- The Nick Cannon Show (2002) .... Himself
- Taina (2001–2002) .... Lamar Carlos Johnson
- 100 Centre Street (2001) .... Earnest Charles Glass
- Law & Order (2001) .... Student Council President Brian Ander
- New York Undercover (1994) .... Tyndell Jacobs
- Crooklyn (1994) ... Nate Carmichael
