= Olamide Faison =

American actor

- Born: Olamide Aladejobi Patrick Alexander Faison; New York City, New York, US
- Occupations: Actor; musician
- Relatives: Donald Faison (brother)

Olamide Aladejobi Patrick Alexander Faison (/oʊˈlɑːmɪˌdeɪ feɪˈzɒn/; born July 21, 1983) is an American actor and musician.

== Early life ==
Olamide Aladejobi Patrick Alexander Faison was born in New York City. He is a younger brother of Donald Faison, who is best known for playing Turk in Scrubs and a character from the Clueless franchise. Their parents are talent agent Shirley Faison and Donald Faison Sr., both of whom have been active in the National Black Theatre in Harlem, Manhattan, New York City.

Due to Nigerian ancestry, his first given name is of Yoruba origin, meaning "my wealth has come."

== Career ==
Faison has worked in television, film and commercials. He portrayed a young Malcolm X in the UK documentary film Seven Songs for Malcolm X and appears in the 1996 telefilm Rebound: The Legend of Earl 'The Goat' Manigault. Among the commercials, he appeared in are for all brands: Pizza Hut, Chevrolet and Mattel.

Starting in 2003, Faison played Miles Robinson on the PBS children's TV show Sesame Street,. He appeared in character as Miles at the Sesame Place theme park, promoting "Healthy Habits" in 2006. He is the third actor to play the role, after Miles Orman and Imani Patterson. Before taking over as Miles, Faison appeared on the series as an imaginary son of Maria and Luis in Episode 2608 (season 20), and as one of the Sesame Street kids during season 21.

== Music ==
Faison is the lead singer and guitarist for the four-piece teen R&B boy group Imajin which formed in 1998, but signed by Universal/Motown. Between recording scenes for Sesame Street, he practiced his musicianship in the halls of the Kaufman Astoria Studios, where the show was shot.

In 2010, Faison contributed background vocals on the song "Skybourne" from Currensy's 2010 album Pilot Talk.

== Personal life ==
Faison dated reality television personality Natalie Nunn from 2003 to 2009, but ended their relationship of six years.
