= Sooner or Later (Rex Smith album) =

Studio album by Rex Smith
- Released: 1979
- Genres: Pop; soft rock
- Length: 32:58
- Label: Columbia
- Producers: Charles Calello; Stephen Lawrence

Rex Smith chronology
| Where Do We Go from Here (1977) | Sooner or Later (1979) | Forever (1979) |

Singles from Forever
- 1. "You Take My Breath Away" Released: 1979; 2. "Simply Jessie" Released: 1979; 3. "Never Gonna Give You Up" Released: 1979

Professional ratings
Review scores
| Source | Rating |
|---|---|
| AllMusic | 2/5 stars |

Sooner or Later is the third studio album by American singer-actor Rex Smith, released in 1979 by Columbia Records, and it also serves as a soundtrack album to the 1979 made-for-television film of the same name, starring Smith and Denise Miller.

The album peaked at number 19 on the Billboard albums chart on June 23, 1979, and spawned the hit singles: "You Take My Breath Away", "Simply Jessie" and "Never Gonna Give You Up".

== Track listing ==
The first four soundtrack songs were featured in the film Sooner or Later.

| No. | Title | Length |
|---|---|---|
| 1. | "You Take My Breath Away" (Stephen Lawrence, Bruce Hart) | 3:18 |
| 2. | "Sooner or Later" (Stephen Lawrence, Bruce Hart) | 2:54 |
| 3. | "Simply Jessie" (Stephen Lawrence, Bruce Hart) | 3:08 |
| 4. | "Better Than It's Ever Been Before" (Stephen Lawrence, Bruce Hart) | 4:07 |
| 5. | "Love Street" (Dominic Bugatti, Frank Musker) | 2:59 |
| 6. | "Never Gonna Give You Up" (Greg Guidry) | 2:59 |
| 7. | "Sway" (Dominic Bugatti, Frank Musker) | 3:10 |
| 8. | "Oh What a Night for Romance" (Russ Ballard) | 3:12 |
| 9. | "Ain't That Peculiar" (William "Smokey" Robinson, Marvin Tarplin, Ronald White) | 3:33 |
| 10. | "If You Think You Know How to Love Me" (Nicky Chinn, Mike Chapman) | 3:38 |

== Charts ==
| Chart (1979) | Position |
|---|---|
| Australia (Kent Music Report) | 92 |
| US Top LPs & Tape (Billboard) | 19 |
