= Simply Jessie =

Single by Rex Smith

from the album Sooner or Later
- B-side: "Burn Your Bridges"
- Released: 1979
- Genre: Soft rock
- Length: 3:08
- Label: Columbia
- Songwriter(s): Bruce Hart; Stephen Lawrence
- Producer(s): Charles Calello; Stephen Lawrence

Rex Smith singles chronology
"You Take My Breath Away" (1979)	"Simply Jessie" (1979)	"Never Gonna Give You Up" (1979)

"Simply Jessie" is a song by singer/actor Rex Smith, released as the second single from his third studio album Sooner or Later. The song is also featured in the 1979 made-for-television film of the same title starring Smith and Denise Miller. It was produced by Charles Calello and Stephen Lawrence, and written by Lawrence and Bruce Hart.

The song reached number 31 on the U.S. Billboard Adult Contemporary chart in August 1979, with a total of 9 weeks on the chart.

A popular song in the Philippines, it has been covered by local singers Ogie Alcasid, Sharon Cuneta and Melissa Gibbs and sampled by rapper Genezide.
