= Alan Clay =

Australian film director

Alan Clay is an Australian film director, writer and clown teacher. In his early career he performed and taught extensively as a clown. He wrote three novels and a clown textbook. He went on to write and direct a short film and two feature films, which are adapted from his novels.

== Biography ==
Clay is the son of literacy scientist, Marie Clay.

In 2007 he produced, wrote and directed the short film Moontan, a story about two street clowns swept up in the occupation of New Zealand's last Victorian theatre, the Royal Wanganui Opera House. The script was an adaptation of his first novel, published in 1995.

Moontan screened at the Fringe Film Festival in Wellington, New Zealand in July 2007, and in the Market at the Clermont-Ferrand Short Film Festival 2008 and the Short Film Corner at the Cannes Film Festival in France. A DVD was released in 2009, which includes a 20-minute 'making of' documentary.

Clay produced, wrote and directed his first feature film Butterfly Crush in 2009, which he adapted from his novel Dance Sisters. The film was released in New Zealand in 2010 and will be distributed in North America by Vanguard Cinema.

Butterfly Crush won an "Accolade Award of Excellence" for Best Supporting Actor for Amelia Shankley's portrayal of the Dreamguides leader, Star. The film won the "Best International Narrative Feature" award at the Anthem Film Festival in Las Vegas, which presents "the year's best films about personal and civil liberty". It has also won the "Best Feature Drama" at the Indie Gathering Film Festival in Ohio and the "Best Feature Film" award at the Reel Independent Film Extravaganza in Washington D.C.

Courting Chaos is a 2014 award winning romantic comedy, which Clay wrote and directed. The film is adapted from his book Angels Can Fly, a Modern Clown User Guide and the story is about a Beverly Hills girl who falls for a Venice Beach street clown called Chaos. She must overcome her inhibitions and become a clown herself for the relationship to survive.

Courting Chaos won the Best Comedy Film award at its premiere at the Hollywood Reel Independent Film Festival in February 2014 and went on to win the Special Jury Award for Romantic Comedy from WorldFest-Houston International Film Festival,, where lead actor, Rachelle DiMaria, was also nominated for Best Actor. The film also received Awards of Merit for Best Director and Best Feature Film from the Accolade Competition.

== Writing career ==
His first novel, Moontan, a Clown's Story, was well received at its launch at the Wellington Fringe Festival in New Zealand, and in Australia at the Warana Festival in Brisbane in 1994.

Clay's second novel, Dance Sisters, was launched at the Melbourne Writers Festival in 1997. In the novel a female song and dance trio threatens to self-destruct on the brink of fame, when its leader becomes involved with a manipulative cult, touting astrology and virtual dreaming.

In Clay's third novel, Believers in Love, a father and daughter team of sand-sculptors embark on an adventure which takes them from Sydney's Bondi Beach to a magic mountain in New Zealand, in which they explore the transient nature of art and life, and discover that dreams are real. American reviews of Believers in Love were positive and as a result Clay toured literary festivals in the United States and Canada in 2003.

In 2005 he published Angels Can Fly, a Modern Clown User Guide, which includes 50 clown exercises developed over 30 years of teaching and to which clowns from around the world have submitted anecdotes from their experience. Angels Can Fly was launched at the Brisbane Festival.

== Performing career ==
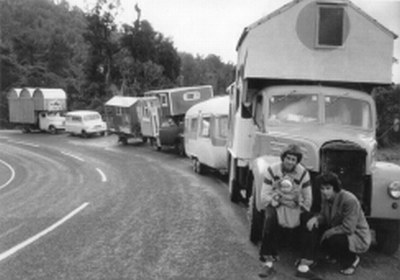
Imperial Trunk Fools on the road, New Zealand 1978

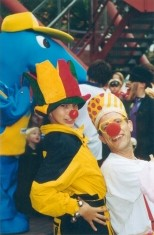
Father and son clown duo, Alan and Michael as Snap and Crackle

Clay studied clowning in Stockholm, Sweden in 1977, and then formed the Imperial Trunk Fools Theatre Company (pictured right), which toured New Zealand in 1978 performing at Community Arts Festivals.

Over the next two years Clay performed with his partner, Kerstin Gronlund, as the duo "High Waves", touring the Pacific Islands and Scandinavia. He started teaching clowning in Oslo, Norway, in 1981 and 1982, and subsequently taught workshops at festivals and arts centres in Germany and Denmark while performing his solo show extensively on the streets throughout Europe.

He formed "Playspace Theatre" in 1984, which toured festivals in New Zealand with Weird People Playing Normal Games, a theatre performance which had elements of mime, movement and clowning.

In the mid-1990s he toured European and Australian festivals with his teenage son, Michael, as the duo Snap and Crackle (pictured right) including performances at the Pflasterspektakel in Linz, Austria and the Vlissingen International Festival in the Netherlands and the Stockholm Water Festival in Sweden.

During 1997 and 1998 Alan performed together with Amanda Burgess in the duo The Untouchables, touring New Zealand, Australia, the Netherlands, Germany, and Austria.

== Playspace Studio ==
Playspace Studio was New Zealand's first clown school, which Alan established in Auckland in 1983 and 1984.

From 1998 to 2006 he re-established Playspace Studio in Newtown, Sydney, where he taught year-long clowning courses.

== Teaching Clowning ==
In 1985 Clay was invited to teach residencies at The Drill Hall arts centre in London, and the Aarhus Theatre School in Denmark, performing at the Copenhagen International Film Festival and at the Festival of Fools in Amsterdam.

He settled in Adelaide, South Australia, in 1989, where he taught youth theatre and TAFE classes over three years and served on the board of the Adelaide Fringe Festival.

From 1992 to 1999 he taught comedy and acting at the Actors Centre Australia in Sydney and from 2003 to 2006 he taught Clown Masterclasses in Australia, New Zealand, Canada, and the United States.

From 2007 until 2010 he taught clown retreats in Wanganui, New Zealand, and this programme has now been expanded to include a 3-week Summer School.
