= Rex Smith =

American actor and singer (born 1955)

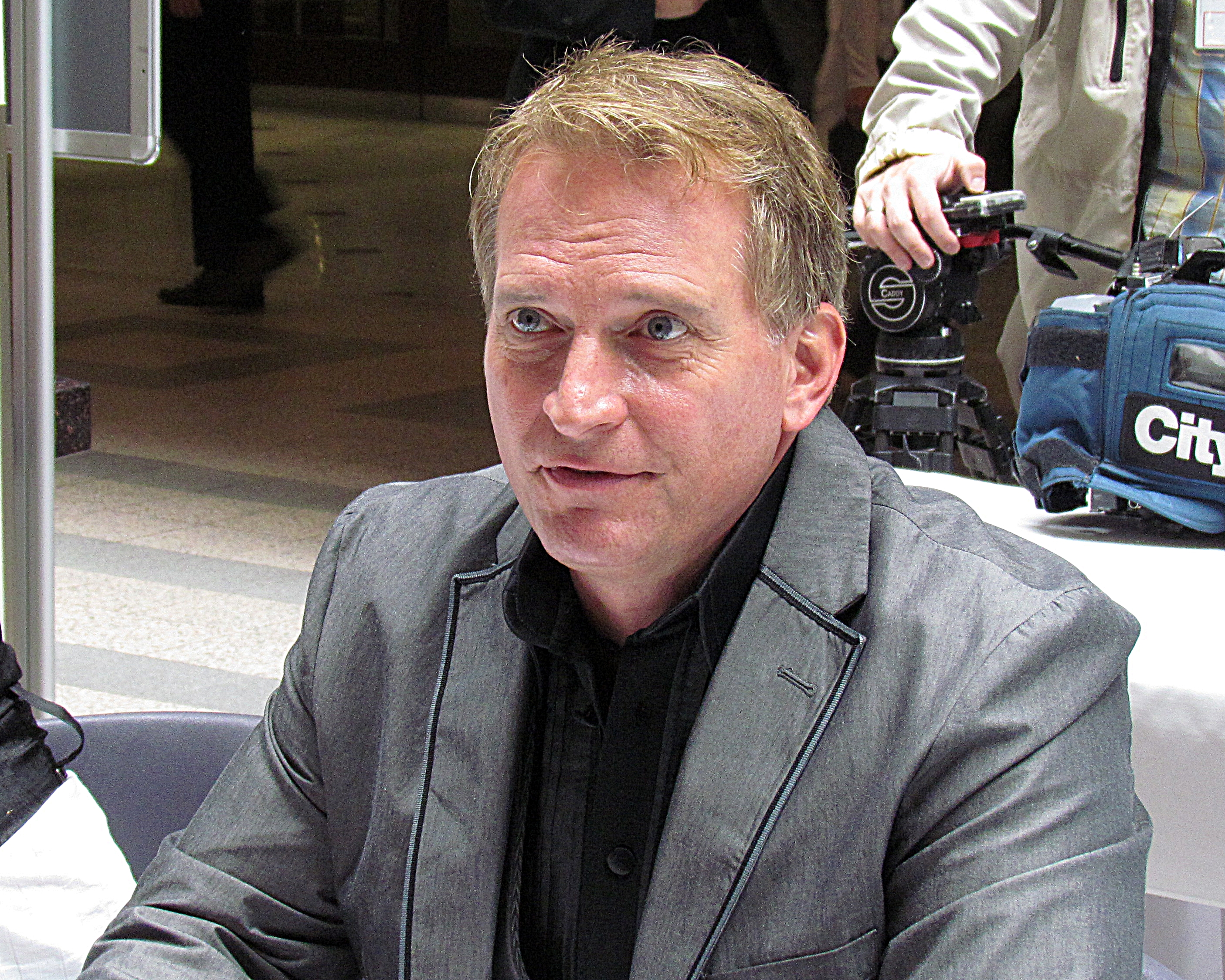
- Smith in 2012

Background information
- Born: September 19, 1955 (age 70); Jacksonville, Florida, U.S.
- Genres: Soft rock, pop
- Occupations: Actor, singer
- Instruments: Vocals, guitar
- Years active: 1972–present
- Label: Columbia
- Website: rexsmith.com

Rex Smith (born September 19, 1955) is an American actor and singer. Smith made his acting debut in the Broadway musical Grease in 1978. He is noted for his role as Jesse Mach in the 1985 television series Street Hawk and for being the first actor to play the Marvel Comics superhero Daredevil in live action. During the late 1970s, Smith was popular as a teen idol. He was featured regularly in 16 Magazine and Tiger Beat. He also had a gold top 10 single, "You Take My Breath Away", in 1979.

== Career ==
=== Music ===
In the early 1970s, Smith was the lead singer for a band from Atlanta called Tricks and then later a band named Phaedra. Smith next sang vocals in a hard rock band called Rex.

In 1979, he had a hit single from the television film Sooner or Later, entitled "You Take My Breath Away", which reached No. 10 on the Billboard Hot 100. It is on the platinum-selling album Sooner or Later, which is also named after the film. The music for this song was written by Stephen J. Lawrence and the lyrics were written by Bruce Hart. For many years, it was a staple on the play lists of FM radio stations with a soft rock or "lite" format.

In 1981, Smith reached the top 40 again with a remake of "Everlasting Love", in a duet with singer Rachel Sweet. Peaking at No. 32, the song is Smith's last charting to date. The song also became Smith's only appearance on the UK Singles Chart, peaking at No. 35.

Smith performed live at the 1982 Miss Universe pageant main event night, held in Lima, Peru.

His latest album was released in 2000 and entitled Simply...Rex. It was re-released in 2006 and re-titled You Take My Breath Away.

In 2016, Rex performed in the Philippines at the Kia Theatre, Araneta Center.

=== Television ===
Smith is best known for his role as motorcycle police officer Jesse Mach in the short-running 1985 television series Street Hawk, but he has also made guest appearances on a variety of television shows, such as The Love Boat, Baywatch, Caroline in the City and JAG. Smith has been a celebrity spokesperson for a number of corporate entities.

Also in 1982, Smith replaced Andy Gibb as a host on the music variety show Solid Gold.

In 1989, Smith played Daredevil in the television movie The Trial of the Incredible Hulk. This was intended as a backdoor pilot for an ongoing Daredevil television series (which did not materialize).

From 1990 through 1992, Smith was a contract player on the CBS daytime drama As the World Turns in the role of Darryl Crawford.

=== Stage ===
In 1979, Smith made his Broadway debut in the musical Grease in the lead role of Danny Zuko.

Smith starred as Frederic in the New York Shakespeare Festival's Central Park production of The Pirates of Penzance. In 1981, Smith won the Theatre World Award for his role in Pirates. Smith reprised the role of Frederic in the 1983 film adaptation, along with fellow Broadway cast members Kevin Kline as the Pirate King, Linda Ronstadt as Mabel and Tony Azito as the Police Sergeant.

Smith has appeared in other Broadway and Off-Broadway productions, including The Scarlet Pimpernel, Grand Hotel, The Human Comedy, and Annie Get Your Gun. He played Joe Gillis opposite Diahann Carroll as Norma Desmond in the 1995 Canadian production of Sunset Boulevard.

In 1995, Smith reprised his role as Danny Zuko throughout the touring production of Grease.

Smith also starred as Fred Graham/Petruchio in the 2001–02 national tour of Kiss Me, Kate.

In 2005, Smith again starred in The Pirates of Penzance, this time playing the role of the Pirate King.

Smith appeared as the Captain in The Sound of Music at the Ogunquit Playhouse, in 2010.

Smith has appeared in non-singing roles in two Neil Simon plays: Plaza Suite opposite Eve Plumb at Judson Theatre Company in 2015 and Barefoot in the Park at Sharon Playhouse in 2018.

Most recently, Smith played the role of Billy Mack in the multi-media production Love Actually Live at the Wallis Annenberg Center for the Performing Arts in both 2018 and 2019.

== Personal life ==
Smith has been married four times:

- Lois Smith, a Playboy bunny; married from 1978 to 1983
- Jamie Buell, married on February 28, 1987, and divorced in 1995. The couple have two daughters.
- Courtney Schrage, married in 1998 and divorced a few years later. She later became her husband's manager. The couple have a son and a daughter.
- Dr. Tracy Lin, born and raised in Los Angeles. They were married in September, 2009.

Smith also has a son, born in 1980, by Karen Lakey, a record-company representative with whom he had a weekend affair. Father and son met for the first time in 1997, during Smith's appearance in the musical Sunset Boulevard when he was signing autographs.

Smith is the brother of Michael Lee Smith, the singer of rock band Starz.

== Discography ==
=== Albums ===
Year	Title	Label
1976	Rex	Columbia
1977	Where Do We Go from Here	Columbia
1979	Sooner or Later	Columbia
1979	Forever	Columbia
1980	The Pirates of Penzance (Broadway Cast Album)	Elektra
1981	Everlasting Love	Columbia
1983	Camouflage	Columbia
1995	Sunset Boulevard (Original Canadian Cast Recording)	Polydor
1997	The Human Comedy (Original Broadway Cast Recording)	Kilmarnock Records
1999	The Scarlet Pimpernel: Encore! (1998 Broadway Revival Cast)	Atlantic
2000	Simply…Rex (re-titled You Take My Breath Away, 2006)	MCA/Universal

=== Singles ===
Year	Single	Peak chart positions					Album
Year	Single	US	US AC	AUS	CAN	UK	Album
1978	"You Take My Breath Away"	10	11	54	3	–	Sooner or Later
1978	"Simply Jessie"	–	31	–	–	–	Sooner or Later
1978	"Never Gonna Give You Up"	–	–	–	–	–	Sooner or Later
1979	"Forever"	–	–	–	–	–	Forever
1979	"Let's Make a Memory"	–	–	–	–	–	Forever
1981	"Everlasting Love" (with Rachel Sweet)	32	31	41	–	35	Everlasting Love
1981	"Love Will Always Make You Cry"	–	–	–	–	–	Everlasting Love

== Filmography ==
=== Film ===
Year	Title	Role	Notes
1979	Sooner or Later	Michael Skye	TV movie
1980	Headin' for Broadway	Fast Eddie	
1983	The Pirates of Penzance	Frederic	
1987	Shades of Love: The Ballerina and the Blues	Rick Peterson	TV movie
1988	Transformations	Wolfgang Shadduck	Alternate title: Alien Transformations
1989	The Trial of the Incredible Hulk	Matt Murdock / Daredevil	TV movie
1990	Perry Mason: The Case of the Silenced Singer	Andy Sacks	TV movie
1994	Once in a Lifetime	Jeffrey Fields	TV movie
1994	A Passion to Kill	Ted	Alternate title: Rules of Obsession (UK)
1998	Richie Rich's Christmas Wish	Rudy	Direct-to-video
2006	Pope Dreams	Don	Alternate title: Music for My Mother
2006	Collier & Co.	Uncle Billy	Alternate title: John Schneider's Collier & Co.: Hot Pursuit!
2015	Cats Dancing on Jupiter	Rex Katz	
2016	Surge of Power: Revenge of the Sequel	Cube	

=== Television ===
Year	Title	Role	Notes
1979	California Fever	Rex Smith	Episode: "Underground Jock"
1980	The Love Boat	Mark Redding	Episode: "Vicki's First Love"
1980	Saturday Night Live	Frederic / Musical Guest	The cast of The Pirates of Penzance
1982–83	Solid Gold	Himself	Co-host (45 episodes)
1984	Faerie Tale Theatre	The Prince	Episode: "Snow White and the Seven Dwarfs"
1985	Street Hawk	Jesse Mach	Lead role (13 episodes)
1986	New Love, American Style	Rookie	Episode: "Love and Dear Penelope"
1986	Murder, She Wrote	Stew Bennett	Episode: "If a Body Meet a Body"
1986	Dear Penelope and Peter	Ben Berlin	Pilot
1987	Houston Knights	Jake Bodine	Episode: "Desperado"
1987	Christmas with Flicka	Himself	TV special
1988	Cagney & Lacey	Jerry Wickes	Episode: "Old Flames"
1990–92	As the World Turns	Darryl Crawford	Daytime serial (40 episodes)
1993	Silk Stalkings	Bob Johnson	Episode: "Night Games"
1994	Cobra	Mark Dante	Episode: "Blast from the Past"
1997	The Sentinel	Galileo / Frank Rachins	Episode: "Dead Drop"
1997	JAG	Sgt. Max Frankl	Episode: "The Court-Martial of Sandra Gilbert"
1997	Caroline in the City	Dr. David Engel	Episode: "Caroline and the Free Cable"
1998	Pacific Blue	Hudson Miller	Episode: "Caretakers"
1998	Baywatch	Gavin	Episode: "Friends Forever"
1999	Malibu, CA	Jesse Mercer	Episode: "Jason's Song"
2000	The Norm Show	Pirate #1	Episode: "Norm vs. Jenny"
2002	Just Cause	Keith Temple	Episode: "Fading Star"
2007	City Girls	Ben Morgan	Pilot

=== Stage ===
Title	Role	Production dates	Theatre
Grease	Danny Zuko	April 13 - June 3, 1979	US Tour
Grease	u/s Danny Zuko (replacement)	July 1979 - April 13, 1980	Broadway: Bernard B. Jacobs Theatre / Majestic Theatre
The Pirates of Penzance	Frederic	August 5, 1980 - November 28, 1982	Off-Broadway: Delacorte Theatre Broadway: Uris Theatre / Minskoff Theatre, New York City
The Human Comedy	Spangler	April 5–15, 1984	Broadway: Royale Theatre, New York City
West Side Story	Tony	September 3–21, 1985	Kennedy Center for Performing Arts, Washington, D.C.
Brownstone	Stuart	October 8 – December 6, 1986	Off-Broadway: Union Square Theatre, New York City
Carousel	Billy Bigelow	August 15 – September 11, 1988	US Tour
Anything Goes	Billy Crocker	October 18, 1988 – January 15, 1989	US National Tour
Grand Hotel	Felix Von Gaigern (replacement)	April – May 1990	Broadway: Martin Beck Theatre, New York City
Grease	Danny Zuko	September 24, 1994 – 1995	US National Tour
Sunset Boulevard	Joe Gillis	October 15, 1995 – August 18, 1996	Canadian Tour: Toronto
Sunset Boulevard	Joe Gillis	December 1, 1996 – April 9, 1997	Canadian Tour: Vancouver
The Scarlet Pimpernel	Chauvelin (replacement)	October 10, 1998 – May 30, 1999	Broadway: Minskoff Theatre, New York City
Annie Get Your Gun	Frank Butler	July 11 – October 29, 2000	US National Tour
Annie Get Your Gun	Frank Butler (replacement)	April 17 – May 6, 2001	US National Tour
Kiss Me, Kate	Fred Graham / Petruchio	June 19, 2001 – June 16, 2002	US National Tour
The Pirates of Penzance	The Pirate King	June 30 – July 15, 2007	Carpenter Performing Arts Center
The Sound of Music	Captain Georg von Trapp	June 30 – July 24, 2010	Ogunquit Playhouse
Heathers: The Musical	Coach Ripper / Big Bud Dean / Ram's Dad	September 21 – October 6, 2013	Hudson Backstage Theatre
Grease	Vince Fontaine	May 2 – July 27, 2014	Welk Resorts Theatre
Love Actually Live	Billy Mack	November 27 – December 29, 2019	Wallis Annenberg Center for the Performing Arts
Love Actually Live	Billy Mack	November 27 – December 31, 2021	Wallis Annenberg Center for the Performing Arts
Aida	Zoser	September 30 – October 1, 2022	James K. Polk Theater
