= You Take My Breath Away (Rex Smith song) =

Single by Rex Smith

from the album Sooner or Later
- B-side: "You're Never Too Old to Rock & Roll"
- Released: April 1979
- Genre: Bubblegum pop
- Length: 3:19
- Label: CBS
- Songwriters: Bruce Hart; Stephen J. Lawrence
- Producers: Charles Calello; Stephen J. Lawrence

Rex Smith singles chronology
"You Take My Breath Away" (1979)	"Simply Jessie" (1979)

"You Take My Breath Away" is a ballad performed by American singer-actor Rex Smith, released as the lead single from his third studio album Sooner or Later (1979). The track was also featured in the 1979 made-for-television film of the same title starring Smith and Denise Miller. It was produced by Charles Calello and Stephen Lawrence, and written by Lawrence and Bruce Hart.

== Charts ==
The song reached number ten on the U.S. Billboard Hot 100 in 1979 for two weeks (dated on June 23) and spent two weeks at number seven on the Cash Box Top 100. It also peaked at number 11 on the Adult Contemporary chart. The song was certified Gold. In Canada, "You Take My Breath Away" reached as high as number three on the Pop chart and number one on the Adult Contemporary chart. It peaked at #27 in New Zealand.

=== Weekly charts ===
Chart (1979)	Position
Australia (Kent Music Report)	54

=== Year-end charts ===
Year-end chart (1979)	Rank
US Top Pop Singles (Billboard)	86

== Certifications ==
Region	Certification	Certified units/sales
Canada (Music Canada)	Gold	75,000^{^}
United States (RIAA)	Gold	1,000,000^{^}
^{^} Shipments figures based on certification alone.
