= Bruce Hart =

Bruce Hart may refer to:

- Bruce Hart (songwriter) (1938–2006), American songwriter and screenwriter
- Bruce Hart (wrestler) (born 1950), Canadian wrestler
