= Elaine Laron =

American songwriter and lyricist

- Born: February 18, 1930; The Bronx, New York, U.S.
- Died: June 6, 2013 (aged 83); Los Angeles, California, U.S.
- Occupations: Songwriter, lyricist
- Known for: The Electric Company; Free to Be… You and Me

Elaine Laron (February 18, 1930 – June 6, 2013) was an American songwriter and lyricist. She was known for her work on the children's television show The Electric Company.

== Career ==
Born in The Bronx, New York in 1930, she began her writing career with greeting cards and soon turned to writing song lyrics. Her first recorded release was "Those Are the Breaks" by cabaret performer Arthur Siegel in 1954. In the 1960s, she wrote "The Loving Song" by Nana Mouskouri and the anti-war song "Hell No, I Ain't Gonna Go" by civil rights activist Matthew Jones.

She collaborated with composers such as Stephen Schwartz, Charles Strouse, Joe Raposo, Ron Dante and Vic Mizzy. Her work with Mizzy appears on his 2004 album, Songs for the Jogging Crowd. She also wrote a Kool-Aid jingle that was recorded by The Monkees in 1969. The jingle is set to be included in a 2013 re-issue of the album The Monkees Present. Her television writing began with the children's series Captain Kangaroo, which led to her becoming writer and head lyricist for the Emmy Award-winning The Electric Company. She wrote more than 30 songs for the series in its first season of 1971-72. The original soundtrack album won a Grammy Award for the cast. In 1972, Laron contributed to Marlo Thomas' children's project Free to Be… You and Me, which was a record, book and, in 1974, a television movie. Laron wrote several poems for the book, and one, "The Sun and the Moon," was set to music and recorded by Dionne Warwick for the television special, which won an Emmy and Peabody Award. The project was also made in a musical and features some of Laron's music.

== Death ==
On June 6, 2013, Laron died of pneumonia in Los Angeles at the age of 83. She was the sister of Marilyn Funt, former wife of Allen Funt.
