= Free to Be... You and Me =

1970s US children's entertainment project

Cast recording
- Released: November 1972
- Recorded: May–July 1972
- Studios: Mediasound, New York City (music); CBS, New York (vocal overdubs/spoken word)
- Labels: Bell Records (original issue); Arista Records (reissue)
- Producers: Carole Hart, Stephen J. Lawrence, Bruce Hart

Free to Be... You and Me is a children's entertainment project, conceived, created and executive-produced by actress and author Marlo Thomas. Produced in collaboration with the Ms. Foundation for Women, it was a record album and illustrated book first released in November 1972 featuring songs and stories sung or told by celebrities of the day (credited as "Marlo Thomas and Friends") including Alan Alda, Rosey Grier, Cicely Tyson, Carol Channing, Michael Jackson, Roberta Flack, Shirley Jones, Jack Cassidy, and Diana Ross. An ABC television special, also created by Thomas, using poetry, songs, and sketches, followed sixteen months later in March 1974. The basic concept was to encourage post-1960s gender neutrality, saluting values such as individuality, tolerance, and comfort with one's identity. A major thematic message is that anyone—whether a boy or a girl—can achieve anything.

In 2021, the album was deemed "culturally, historically, or aesthetically significant" by the Library of Congress and selected for preservation in the National Recording Registry.

== Overview ==
The original idea to create the album began with Marlo Thomas, who wanted to teach her then-young niece Dionne (née Gordon) Kirchner about life, in particular that it is acceptable to refute or reject the gender stereotypes expressed in children's books of the period. In an Emmy Legends interview Thomas explains:

I told my sister Terre "it would take Dionne 30 years to get over it [stories featuring traditional gender roles], the same as it took all of us. We need to find her some different books to read," and she said, "You go and find 'em." Well there weren't any. And not only weren't there any, I was in the bookstore one day looking around and found this one (picture book—I'm Glad I'm a Boy! I'm Glad I'm a Girl! by Whitney Darrow Jr.) that showed a pilot on one page and a stewardess on a facing page (with a caption) that said "Boys are pilots, girls are stewardesses." Well I nearly had a heart attack right there in the bookstore. So I said "I'll make a record for Dionne. I'll ask everybody to donate their talents and it'll be fun."

Produced by Carole Hart, with music produced by Stephen J. Lawrence and Bruce Hart, with stories and poems directed by Alan Alda, the title has never been out of print.

Proceeds went to the Ms. Foundation for Women. The album was originally released on Bell Records in 1972 and, since 1974, has been available on Arista Records cassettes and CDs.

Well-known songs include "It's All Right to Cry," sung by football hero Rosey Grier; the title track by the New Seekers; "Helping," a Shel Silverstein poem performed by Tom Smothers; "Sisters and Brothers" by the Voices of East Harlem; and "When We Grow Up" performed by Diana Ross on the album and by Roberta Flack and a teenage Michael Jackson on the special.

Other sketches, some of them animated in the television special, include "Atalanta," co-narrated by Thomas and Alda, a retelling of the ancient Greek legend of Atalanta; "Boy Meets Girl" with Thomas and Mel Brooks providing the voices for puppets, designed, performed and manipulated by Wayland Flowers, resembling human babies, who use cultural gender stereotypes to try to discover which is a boy and which a girl; "William's Doll", based on Charlotte Zolotow's picture book about a boy whose family resists his requests for a doll until his grandmother explains that William wishes to practice being a good father; and "Dudley Pippin" with Robert Morse and Billy De Wolfe, based on stories by Phil Ressner.

A number of pieces from the record did not make the special, most for lack of time, although "Housework" was left off due to the somewhat condescending tone it lent to its description of domestic workers.

Thomas says in the Emmy Legends 40th anniversary interview:

In among all the praise we got for the project as a whole, we kept getting all these letters and phone calls talking about the track sounding as if it wasn't normal to be fond of cooking and cleaning and caretaking etc. So we left that off the special for that reason.

The children pictured on the original LP jacket were schoolmates of Abigail, Robin, and David Pogrebin, children of Letty Cottin Pogrebin, then editor of Ms. Most of the children attended Corlears School.

"Marlo Thomas and Friends" followed Free to Be... You and Me with a 1988 sequel, Free to Be... a Family, the first primetime variety show created and produced in both the United States and the Soviet Union.

== Reception ==
Professional ratings
Review scores
| Source | Rating |
|---|---|
| Christgau's Record Guide | A− |

Reviewing the LP in Christgau's Record Guide: Rock Albums of the Seventies (1981), Robert Christgau wrote: "I've been giving this high-minded feminist kiddie record to various young Americans on the theory that it is not necessary, or easy, to like the New York Dolls at age five. I figured it would be good for them, like baths. Surprise number one is that they all love it, to a person. Surprise number two is that I myself would much rather listen to Carol Channing on housework than to Robert Klein on dope."

According to Thomas, "Larry Uttal at Bell Records told me, this kind of record might sell 15,000 copies tops. Well it went Gold right away, went Platinum within two years and went Diamond in under ten years. EVERYBODY was amazed it had touched such a nerve. It's still in the top 100 albums of all time over 40 years later."

Free to Be faced backlash from some conservative religious leaders, including Evangelical author and psychologist James Dobson.

In her 2010 memoir, Growing Up Laughing, Thomas reflected on the astonishing impact the Free to Be projects had on the culture.

The show won an Emmy and a Peabody, the book became number one on the New York Times best-seller list and the record went gold. We were floored by the impact it all had. My little message for Dionne had gone straight to the hearts of moms and dads and aunties and uncles and, most of all, teachers, who embraced it as a way to teach the kids in their lives a new way of thinking about themselves.

== Television special ==
A television special, produced by Marlo Thomas and Free to Be Productions, in association with Teru Murakami-Fred Wolf Films, Inc. and cosponsored by the Ms. Foundation, first aired March 11, 1974, on ABC. The broadcast earned an 18.6 rating/27 share and went on to win an Emmy Award. Sixteen millimeter film prints were also struck, and some schoolchildren from the 1970s and 1980s remember seeing the television special, or the filmstrip based on the special, at school during the era.

The special appeared occasionally on HBO throughout the 1980s, and was released on VHS and Betamax videotapes through Vestron Video subsidiary Children's Video Library in 1983. It also aired on the cable channel TV Land.

A Region 1 DVD was released in November 2001, and in 2010, a newly remastered version was issued featuring a number of new extras, including a deleted scene showcasing Dustin Hoffman.

=== Cast ===
- Marlo Thomas
- Alan Alda
- Harry Belafonte
- Mel Brooks
- Jack Cassidy
- Carol Channing
- Rita Coolidge
- Billy De Wolfe
- Roberta Flack
- Rosey Grier
- Dustin Hoffman
- Michael Jackson
- Kris Kristofferson
- Robert Morse
- The New Seekers
- Tom Smothers
- Cicely Tyson
- Voices of East Harlem
- Dionne Warwick

=== Summary ===
1. As a group of children frolic on a carousel, the titular song by the New Seekers plays in the background.
2. In a hospital, infant depictions of Thomas and Brooks debate their genders.
3. Flack and Jackson perform "When We Grow Up" while enacting children playing.
4. Baby Thomas and Brooks watch adults and discuss them.
5. Thomas and Belafonte take on various jobs performing "Parents Are People."
6. Thomas tells a story about a pretty girl who always goes first, until she gets eaten by tigers.
7. During a bath, Thomas and Brooks overhear a grown-up doing baby talk.
8. Thomas, Morse, and De Wolfe talk about how Dudley Pippin got in trouble but ended up getting cheered up by the principal.
9. Grier performs "It's All Right to Cry" while many people crying are shown.
10. Thomas and Alda sing about a boy named William who wants a doll.
11. Thomas and Brooks sing a song about babies after they do not like the lullaby.
12. A retelling of Atalanta performed by Alda and Thomas.
13. Warwick sings "The Sun and the Moon" with many paintings of the sun and moon shown.
14. Hoffman reads compositions by Jules Siegel.
15. Smothers sings "Helping", a poem by Shel Silverstein.
16. Thomas talks to children about having a sibling, then the Voices of East Harlem perform "Sisters and Brothers".
17. Tyson reads "Three Wishes" by Lucille Clifton, a folktale about a girl who gets three wishes after finding a penny with her birth year on New Year's Day.
18. Thomas, Kristofferson, and Coolidge sing "Circle of Friends" with their friends.
19. Baby Brooks and Thomas bid each other farewell as they are taken away to live their own lives.
20. The children on the horses return to the carousel as the reprise to the title track plays along. The camera zooms out of the carousel, showing first the whole park, then Manhattan, encompasses Greater New York, the US and finally the world as the song ends, similar to The Big Blue Marble title sequence.
21. A brief one line reprise of "Sisters and Brothers".
22. End-title/exit music featuring a montage of themes from the special.

== Track listing (New York cast album) ==
Some material here is left out of the TV special, and vice versa, while other material appears only in the accompanying hardcover book.

=== Act One ===
1. "Free to Be... You and Me" – Music by Stephen J. Lawrence, lyrics by Bruce Hart, performed by the New Seekers
2. "Boy Meets Girl" – Written by Carl Reiner and Peter Stone, performed by Mel Brooks and Marlo Thomas
3. "When We Grow Up" – Music by Stephen J. Lawrence, lyrics by Shelly Miller, performed by Roberta Flack and Michael Jackson on the special and Diana Ross on the Original Cast album.
4. "Don't Dress Your Cat in an Apron" – Written by Dan Greenburg, performed by Billy De Wolfe

=== Act Two ===
1. "Parents Are People" – Music and Lyrics by Carol Hall, performed by Harry Belafonte and Marlo Thomas
2. "Housework" – Written by Sheldon Harnick, performed by Carol Channing
3. "Helping" – Written by Shel Silverstein, performed by Tom Smothers
4. "Ladies First" – Performed by Marlo Thomas, based on the Shel Silverstein poem of the same name.
5. "Dudley Pippin and the Principal" – Written by Phil Ressner, performed by Billy De Wolfe, Bobby Morse, and Marlo Thomas

=== Act Three ===
1. "It's All Right to Cry" – Music and Lyrics by Carol Hall, performed by Rosey Grier
2. "Sisters and Brothers" – Music by Stephen J. Lawrence, lyrics by Bruce Hart, performed by The Voices of East Harlem
3. "William's Doll" – Music by Mary Rodgers, lyrics by Sheldon Harnick, performed by Alan Alda and Marlo Thomas (based on the children's book of the same name)
4. "My Dog Is a Plumber" – Written by Dan Greenburg, performed by Dick Cavett

=== Act Four ===
1. "Atalanta" – Written by Betty Miles, performed by Alan Alda and Marlo Thomas
2. "Grandma" – Written by Carole Hart, performed by Diana Sands
3. "Girl Land" – Music by Mary Rodgers, lyrics by Bruce Hart, performed by Jack Cassidy and Shirley Jones
4. "Dudley Pippin and His No-Friend" – Written by Phil Ressner, performed by Bobby Morse and Marlo Thomas
5. "Glad to Have a Friend Like You" – Music and lyrics by Carol Hall, performed by Marlo Thomas

=== Epilogue ===
1. "Free to Be... You and Me" – Reprise

=== Bonus tracks ===
Different performances from those included in the film – and not included on the original LP or CD

1. "Let's Hear It for Babies" – Words and music by Edward Kleban – Performed by Marlo Thomas and Mel Brooks
2. "The Sun and the Moon" – Words by Elaine Laron, music by Stephen J. Lawrence – Performed by Dionne Warwick
3. "Circle of Friends" – Music by Stephen J. Lawrence, lyrics by Bruce Hart – Performed by Kris Kristofferson, Rita Coolidge and cast

== 40th anniversary ==
In March 2014, The Paley Center for Media hosted an event commemorating the 40th anniversary of Free to Be, co-moderated by Marlo Thomas and Gloria Steinem, which included many of the participants in the original project.

=== Book ===
To commemorate the 40th anniversary of the original project, a book called When We Were Free to Be: Looking Back at a Children's Classic and the Difference It Made was published.
