= Amelia Shankley =

British actress

Amelia Shankley (born 18 June 1972) is a British actress, the daughter of actor and singer Jeff Shankley.

== Career ==
Shankley is known for her role as the young Alice Liddell in the film Dreamchild (1985), from a script by Dennis Potter, and Sara Crewe in the LWT version of A Little Princess (1986), based upon the novel A Little Princess by Frances Hodgson Burnett. Shankley also portrayed Vicki Lovejoy in seasons two and three of the television series Lovejoy.

== Filmography ==
Film and television
Year	Title	Role	Notes
1985	Dreamchild	Alice Liddell	
1987	A Little Princess	Sara Crewe	TV miniseries
1989	Red Riding Hood	Linet	
1989	Mother Love	Harriet	TV miniseries
1990	Casualty	Nikki	Episode: "Street Life"
1990	Boon	Justina Bradleigh	Episode: "The Belles of St. Godwalds"
1991–92	Lovejoy	Vicky Lovejoy	Guest role (series 2–3)
1992	Mistress of Suspense		Episode: "The Cat Brought It In"
2009	East of Everything	Woman Driver	Episode: "Weather Man"
2010	Butterfly Crush	Star	

== Awards ==
Winner:

- 1986 Paris Film Festival - Best Actress, Dreamchild

Nominated:

- 1986: Saturn Award for Best Performance by a Younger Actor - Dreamchild
