= Street Hawk =

1985 American crime drama television series

- Rex Smith as Street Hawk
- Genre: Vigilante; Mystery; Action
- Created by: Paul M. Belous; Robert Wolterstorff
- Developed by: Bruce Lansbury
- Starring: Rex Smith; Jeannie Wilson; Richard Venture; Joe Regalbuto
- Opening theme: "Le Parc" by Tangerine Dream
- Composer: Tangerine Dream
- Country of origin: United States
- No. of seasons: 1
- No. of episodes: 13

Production
- Executive producers: Paul M. Belous; Robert Wolterstorff
- Running time: 60 minutes
- Production companies: Limekiln-Templar Productions; Universal Television

Original release
- Network: ABC
- Release: January 4 – May 16, 1985

Street Hawk is an American action television series that aired for 13 episodes on ABC in 1985. The show follows Jesse Mach (Rex Smith), an ex-motorcycle cop recruited for a top-secret government project to ride an advanced "all-terrain attack motorcycle" designed to fight urban crime. Created by Paul M. Belous and Robert Wolterstorff, with its core format developed by producer Bruce Lansbury, the series was produced by Limekiln and Templar in association with Universal Television at a cost of approximately $1 million per episode.

The 70-minute pilot featured Christopher Lloyd as a villain and was scored by Tangerine Dream, who provided the electronic soundtrack for the series. Originally planned for the fall of 1984, the series was pushed to mid-season after Call to Glory performed well in its intended slot. Street Hawk premiered on January 4, 1985, and ran until May 16, 1985. Despite its short run, the series was sold to 42 countries worldwide.

== Plot ==
The premise of the show is narrated before every episode during the opening titles, voiced by Ernie Anderson:

This is Jesse Mach, an ex-motorcycle cop, injured in the line of duty. Now a police troubleshooter, he's been recruited for a top secret government mission to ride Street Hawk -- an all-terrain attack motorcycle designed to fight urban crime, capable of incredible speeds up to three hundred miles an hour, and immense firepower. Only one man, federal agent Norman Tuttle, knows Jesse Mach's true identity. The man...the machine...Street Hawk.

The pilot episode provides the backstory of Jesse Mach's (Rex Smith) earlier work as a police officer and amateur dirt-bike racer, prior to his recruitment by Norman Tuttle (Joe Regalbuto) for the Street Hawk project. The capabilities of the motorcycle and its computer backend are also established, which include providing the motorcycle rider with real-time mission information to assisting the motorcycle during its high-speed "hyperthrust" runs.

All subsequent episodes show Mach leading a double life, a police public relations officer by day, and crimefighter by night. Street Hawk is regarded as a lawless vigilante and a public relations embarrassment by the police, especially by Mach's commanding officer Captain Leo Altobelli (Richard Venture). Each episode deals with a specific crime or mission, and there are no multi-episode story arcs.

== Production ==
The development of Street Hawk was a direct response by Universal Television and ABC to the already successful shows Knight Rider (1982 TV series) and Airwolf. Production, however, was troubled from the start; studio interference led to creative differences, including the casting of several actors over the objections of the creators (most noticeably the casting of Rex Smith instead of the writers choice of then-unknown George Clooney) and even with an episode budget of $1 million, expensive props, stunts and the inexperience of Belous and Wolterstorff led to spiralling costs. Tension also arose between the cast, crew and production staff over the lack of communication on set. One particular incident involved a stunt which required a large explosion, which was ultimately scrapped; to avoid the costs and delays needed to safely dismantle the explosives, Belous reportedly made the decision to detonate them anyway and clear up the scene after. The explosion was much larger than expected, shattering the windows of several nearby buildings and leading to large city fines and rebuilding costs. ABC and Universal subsequently stripped Belous and Wolterstorff of most of their production powers.

== The motorcycle ==
The motorcycle in the pilot episode was based on a 1983 Honda XL500 trail bike. Motorcyclist Magazine staffers Jeff Karr and Dexter Ford built the motorcycles for the pilot in their Hancock Park, Los Angeles garage, combining parts from an electric start Honda 500 Ascot with the chassis of a dual-sport XL500 on-/off-road bike. The motorcycles used in the series were based on 1984 Honda XR500s, using the electric-start engine of the street-based Ascot, creating the first-known electric-start Honda dual-sport motorcycles. The stunt coordinator insisted on using the turbocharged Honda CX500 street bike for performance-related sequences, but the motorcycles actually used for the stunt shots were based on Honda CR250 racing dirt bikes. The bodywork of the pilot motorcycle was designed by Andrew Probert and the series motorcycles were redesigned by Ron Cobb.

During filming, the fiberglass bike parts constantly flew off the bike during the course of stunt work. The film stunt second unit crew always had six bikes standing by to stand in for the main bike during jump or maneuver scenes. When the first unit was on stage at Universal Studios, the second stunt crew were on location filming with a stunt biker performing with the bike. The stunt bikes were regularly in the effects shop of Universal Studios, being repaired or replaced with parts. A motorcycle shop, not far from the studio, three miles on Lankershim Boulevard, supplied new frames and wheels for the stunt bikes. Winfield Special Projects in Canoga Park made all body panels and special effects. Eric Thaler from Austria was in charge of the project at Winfield.

== Cancellation ==
After the string of on-set difficulties and the removal of Belous and Wolterstorff from creative control, ABC made the decision to bring the show on as a midseason replacement show rather than a Fall premier show. This, alongside the choice to schedule it at the same time as the CBS hit show Dallas (TV series) effectively led to ABC cancelling the show after 13 episodes.

== Music ==
The musical theme was composed by Tangerine Dream and produced by Christopher Franke, and a modified version (which was featured in the pilot episode during the sequence where Mach took the bike out for the first time) appeared on their album Le Parc, titled "Le Parc (L.A. - Streethawk)".

== Episodes ==
No.	Title	Directed by	Written by	Original release date
1	"Street Hawk (Pilot)"	Virgil W. Vogel	Paul M. Belous & Robert Wolterstorff	January 4, 1985
2	"Street Hawk (Pilot)"	Virgil W. Vogel	Paul M. Belous & Robert Wolterstorff	January 4, 1985
Injured motorcycle cop Jesse Mach is chosen to test ride a top-secret government, ultra-fast attack motorcycle called 'Street Hawk', and is partnered with its creator, Norman Tuttle, to combat urban crime in Los Angeles. Their first assignment is to take down sadistic drug smuggler Anthony Corrido, who is the reason for Jesse's injury and who killed his partner.: Note: Originally shown as a feature-length Pilot TV Movie, which was later cut into two separate episodes for syndication.; Guest stars: Lawrence Pressman, Robert Beltran, and Christopher Lloyd.
3	"A Second Self"	Virgil W. Vogel	Bruce Cervi & Nicholas Corea	January 11, 1985
An old friend of Jesse's comes to town and they have fun. But what Jesse does not know is that his friend is working for some people who want Street Hawk.: Notes: Guest-starring George Clooney and Marco Rodriguez.
4	"The Adjuster"	Virgil W. Vogel	Nicholas Corea	January 18, 1985
A tough New York City cop is assigned to extradite a small-time embezzler that was captured by Street Hawk, but his brutal behaviour is too much for Jesse to tolerate, which makes him suspect that the New York cop is not what he seems to be.: Notes: Guest starring Bernard White and Marjoe Gortner.
5	"Vegas Run"	Virgil W. Vogel	Deborah Dean Davis	January 25, 1985
Jesse and Norman protect a beautiful Las Vegas showgirl who must get to a court house to testify against her mobster boyfriend, but she will need every weapon at Street Hawk's disposal to make it there alive and in time.: Notes: Guest-starring Sybil Danning and Gregory Itzin.
6	"Dog Eat Dog"	Daniel Haller	Bruce Cervi & Nicholas Corea	February 1, 1985
Jesse attempts to convince a rock star to appear in a public service announcement, and becomes involved in her ex-boyfriend's murder.: Notes: Guest-starring Daphne Ashbrook, James Whitmore Jr., Kai Wulff and Fear member Lee Ving.
7	"Fire on the Wing"	Virgil W. Vogel	John Huff & L. Ford Neale	February 8, 1985
The police and Street Hawk are occupied with a series of arson attacks at six different warehouses in three cities. The victims, a group of businessmen, are clearly being blackmailed but none of them is willing to talk.: Notes: guest-starring Earl Boen, Jere Burns, and Clu Gulager.
8	"Chinatown Memories"	Paul Stanley	Story by : Deborah Dean Davis & Hannah Louise Shearer; Teleplay by : Deborah Dean Davis	February 15, 1985
An old girlfriend of Jesse's asks for his help when her present boyfriend steals a sacred statue called The Ivory Emperor from a Chinese gang called The Tong, which places his secret identity as Street Hawk in jeopardy.: Guest-starring Keye Luke, Shelagh McLeod, and James Saito.
9	"The Unsinkable 453"	Kim Manners	Paul M. Belous	February 22, 1985
The wife of a deposed foreign leader has a soldier of fortune broken out of jail, so that he can help her remove 20 million dollars from a ship.: Notes: Guest-starring Bianca Jagger.
10	"Hot Target"	Harvey S. Laidman	Story by : Shel Willens & Deborah Dean Davis; Teleplay by : Shel Willens	March 1, 1985
Norman reluctantly makes contact with an old flame when he and Jesse discover that her research lab is involved in the development and Black Market sale of powerful attack laser weaponry.: Notes: Guest-starring Joanna Kerns and Charles Napier.
11	"Murder is a Novel Idea"	Harvey S. Laidman	Karen Harris	March 8, 1985
A 20-year old cold case is re-opened by an author that knows Jesse, but her investigations bring her face to face with a group of murderers intent on keeping the truth behind the murder case a secret.: Notes: Guest-starring Belinda Montgomery.
12	"The Arabian"	Richard Compton	Joseph A. Gunn	May 2, 1985
Jesse competes with a beautiful and intelligent Insurance Agent when they investigate a horse switching scheme and a murder of a stable hand.: Notes: Guest-starring Bibi Besch and Jeff Pomerantz.
13	"Female of the Species"	Harvey Laidman	Karen Harris	May 9, 1985
A Federal Agent blames Jesse for his failure to stop an assassination. However, the assassin is really seeking revenge against the fed who put her away years earlier.: Notes: Alternate title "The Assassin." Guest-starring Ann Turkel, Dennis Franz, and Marc Alaimo.
14	"Follow the Yellow Gold Road"	Daniel Haller	Burton Arumus	May 16, 1985
Jesse battles a gang of neighborhood vigilantes who injured a security guard in the theft of large quantity of gold.: Notes: Guest-starring Robert Costanzo and Catherine Parks.

== Home media ==
DVD Box cover art

There have been at least two official releases of the Street Hawk pilot movie on VHS. One was from MCA Canada and contained the full 90-minute pilot (actually 76 minutes or so without commercials), and the other was the U.S. MCA release that ran about 60 minutes. There are short bits of footage that are unique to each release; for example, even though the U.S. version is shorter, it does include a line or two of dialogue not present in the Canadian version. Other differences include a "blue lightning"-style primary weapon in the Canadian version (whereas the red "laser beam" from the rest of the series appears on the U.S. release) and actual stunt jumps on the U.S. tape instead of "matted-in" fake jumps in the Canadian version.

On July 13, 2010, Shout! Factory released Street Hawk: The Complete Series, a 4 DVD box set featuring all 13 episodes of the series. Special features include an all new 41 minute documentary titled "The Making of a Legend" and an unaired pilot featuring different Street Hawk firepower.

== Novelizations ==
In Britain four novels based on the series were published by Target Books:

1. Street Hawk by Jack Roberts, adapted from the pilot
2. Cons At Large by Jack Roberts, adapted from the episodes "The Adjuster" and "The Unsinkable 453"
3. Golden Eyes by Charles Gale, adapted from the episodes "Follow The Yellow Gold Road" and "Dog Eat Dog"
4. Danger On Target by David Deutsch, adapted from the episodes "Murder is a Novel Idea" and "Hot Target"

== Reception ==
The series, which was aired by Doordarshan in India, was a roaring success especially among adolescent males. This even spawned the introduction of a MTB-style bicycle named "Streetcat", aimed at that market segment.

== Toys ==
In Brazil the Street Hawk toys were produced by Glasslite. One item is the "Moto Laser MRX-1", a slot track with two slot bikes: the Street Hawk and a yellow model. A Jesse Mach action figure was also released.

In the United Kingdom and some countries, a Street Hawk stunt bike was released by Ertl Company. Roughly the same size as standard miniature ERTL vehicles, the toy had a plastic rider, on the motorcycle powered by a friction wheel. The packaging suggests various stunts that the owner can attempt to perform with the toy.

In India, Funskool, the company manufacturing G.I. Joe: A Real American Hero, gave R.A.M. a black paint job, replaced the sidecar with Snake Eyes wearing a silver visor, and sold it under the Street Hawk name.

== See also ==
- Cyclone (1987 film)
