= Butterfly Crush =

- Theatrical release poster
- Directed by: Alan Clay
- Written by: Alan Clay
- Starring: Amelia Shankley; Courtney Hale; Hayley Fielding; Richard Adams; Sally Kelleher
- Cinematography: Garfield Darlington; Ben Ruffell
- Edited by: Anand Doshi
- Production company: Artmedia
- Distributed by: Vanguard Cinema (US)
- Release date: 7 August 2010
- Running time: 90 minutes
- Country: New Zealand
- Language: English

Butterfly Crush is a 2010 film, written and directed by New Zealand filmmaker Alan Clay. It was adapted from his novel Dance Sisters. The story is about an Australian female song and dance duo whose chance at success is jeopardized when one of them gets involved with a cult group.

== Plot ==
Moana and Eva are the song and dance duo "Butterfly Crush". During a performance at Circular Quay in Sydney, a riot engulfs their show. In the midst of the riot, Moana awakens, to discover that the performance and riot was just a virtual dream. She is in the building of the Dreamguides, a cult operating in the Kings Cross neighbourhood of Sydney. Eva has recently become involved with the Dreamguides.

Moana and Eva plan to enter the "Australasian Song Awards" contest and become a big success. This plan starts to evaporate, as Eva slips further into the Dreamguides. She is under the influence of the cult's magnetic leader, Star, who tries to take control of the duo's management.

Despite her distrust of the cult, Moana finds herself being drawn in by an attractive young cult member, Matt. He shows her how the virtual dreaming technology can combine with physical lovemaking to create a new experience of passion.

Deceived and controlled by Star, Eva quits the duo. Moana realises she must find a way to turn the tables on Star, if she wants to get Eva and Butterfly Crush back. She attempts to trap Star, but it backfires when Star succeeds in undermining her faith in herself. Moana is left badly shaken; she wanders around Sydney, lost and dazed.

Moana and the duo's manager, Angel, force Star to allow Eva to perform with Moana at the Awards, and they win. Matt decides to leave the cult and escapes his cult minders to join the duo to celebrate the win.

== Cast ==
- Courtney Hale as Moana
- Hayley Fielding as Eva
- Richard Adams as Matt
- Amelia Shankley as Star
- Sally Kelleher as Angel

== Production ==
=== Development ===
Alan Clay adapted his novel Dance Sisters over a two-year period in 2007/8. The characters and style of the film were developed over three two-week podcast shoots in 2009 where the musical numbers were also recorded, and music videos shot. Podcasts of the central characters were posted on the Internet; audience feedback from the podcasts shaped the development of the film's style.

Clay worked with the young cast over a period of 14 months, using a process involving yoga and emotional warmups.

=== Casting ===
Over 200 actors auditioned in Melbourne, Sydney, Auckland, and Wellington for the lead roles. The cast includes first-time film performers Courtney Hale (Moana), Hayley Fielding (Eva), and Richard Adams (Matt).

Amelia Shankley plays the cult leader Star. As a child actor, she won the Best Actress award of the Paris Film Festival for the feature film Dreamchild, as Alice Liddell, the girl who inspired Lewis Carroll's Alice in Wonderland.

=== Locations ===
The film is set in Sydney. Exteriors were shot there in December 2009, with scenes set at Darling Harbour, Circular Quay, and Kings Cross. All the interior scenes were shot in Wanganui, New Zealand.

== Awards ==
- Accolade Award of Excellence, Best Supporting Actor – Amelia Shankley
- Anthem Film Festival, Best International Narrative Feature award
- Indie Gathering International Film Festival, Best Feature Drama
- Reel Independent Film Extravaganza, Best Feature Drama

== Release ==
The film was released in New Zealand in 2010, and in Australia in April 2012. It was distributed in North American on DVD and TV by Vanguard Cinema and Video On Demand by Indie Rights.
