= Carole Hart =

American writer and television producer (1943–2018)

- Born: Carole Ruth Strickler; April 30, 1943; Paterson, New Jersey, United States
- Died: January 5, 2018 (aged 74); Manhattan, New York, United States
- Education: Barnard College
- Occupation(s): Screenwriter, television producer
- Spouse: Bruce Hart (m. 1963; died 2006)

Carole Ruth Hart (April 30, 1943 – January 5, 2018) was an American writer and television producer who was involved in the inception of Sesame Street and other projects on broadcast television targeted at children.

== Biography ==
Born Carole Ruth Strickler in Paterson, New Jersey on April 30, 1943, she graduated from Barnard College in 1965, where she majored in philosophy.

She married Bruce Hart in 1963, while she was a student in college. She and her husband were at a party where they spoke with a producer who had an idea for a new television program designed to help children develop reading and writing skills. Hart and her husband were hired to develop material for what became Sesame Street. Her husband wrote the theme song, while she wrote some early episodes.

Hart produced Free to Be... You and Me, a project initiated by Marlo Thomas. The music was produced by her husband Bruce Hart together with Stephen J. Lawrence; stories and poems were directed by Alan Alda.

What became Free to Be ... You and Me began with a series of evening discussions organized by Marlo Thomas at her apartment. Marlos chose Hart to produce the album and Bruce Hart joined the meetings, together with Letty Cottin Pogrebin of Ms. magazine, songwriter Mary Rodgers and an expanding group of notable participants who were asked to share lessons they wished they had learned as children. Bruce Hart had proposed Free To Be You and Me Jamboree as the title for the theme song he was developing and it was Carole Hart who convinced her husband to eliminate the word "Jamboree" from the title. The song was ultimately written together with Stephen Lawrence. Several labels rejected the idea but Bell Records, a label owned by Columbia Records, became interested in the project, offering an advance of $15,000. Despite projections by executives at Bell Records of a maximum of 15,000 copies being sold, initial sales were near 500,000.

After meeting Debby Franke Ogg, a woman who had been diagnosed with stage 4 lymphoma who had survived the cancer using alternative therapies, Hart turned the story into Leap of Faith a 1988 television drama that features Anne Archer and Sam Neill. The movie was broadcast on CBS after overcoming objections from the network that people would be discouraged from pursuing standard medical care for cancer based on the portrayal of the success of alternative therapies depicted in the program.

When Hart herself was diagnosed with cancer in 1994, she underwent a Native American healing ceremony and other conventional and alternative treatments that left her free of cancer for 20 years. She died on January 5, 2018, in Manhattan, of cancer that had reappeared two to three years earlier.
