= William's Doll =

1972 picture book by Charlotte Zolotow

- Author: Charlotte Zolotow
- Illustrator: William Pène du Bois
- Genre: Picture book
- Publisher: Harper & Row
- Publication date: 1972
- Pages: 30 pp
- ISBN: 978-0-06-443067-8
- OCLC: 347798

William's Doll is a 1972 picture book written by Charlotte Zolotow and illustrated by William Pene du Bois. It is one of the first children's texts to address nontraditional gender stereotypes. The story follows William, a young boy who wishes for a doll baby to love and care for. His father is unhappy with this, instead giving him toys that he considers to be more gender appropriate. Finally, his grandmother fulfills his request, explaining to her son that the doll will let him practice good parenting.

Zolotow cites personal observations about the relationship between her husband and son as inspiration for the book. She believes that denying young boys access to certain toys and absences of early interaction between father and child are destructive to expression and relationship formation.

The book is often used in the classroom for lessons on gender roles, intolerance, or general anti-bias education. To counterbalance inherent micro-inequalities in the classroom, William's Doll is employed as a method through which educators expose students to the concept of sex-stereotyping. While exposure through children's literature has been employed by many marginalized populations, representations of males such as William with traditionally female characteristics have not been as easily welcomed. Many educators, for example, object to using texts representing gender-role reversal in the classroom, whereas others promote it, recognizing the critical role schools play in childhood identity and sexuality development.

A song based on the story was included in the 1972 best-selling Free to Be... You and Me children's album and songbook. In 1981, William's Doll also became a 14-minute film starring Craig Salles.

== Background ==
Published in 1972, William's Doll extends Zolotow's legacy of recognizing and legitimatizing the emotional capacity of small children. Rejecting condescension based on age, Zolotow appeals to genuineness by introducing themes such as death and anger, and in William's Doll, non-traditional gender stereotypes, to young audiences.

Zolotow explained that although she is a feminist and appreciates feminist support of the book's message, her inspiration derives from personal observations about her husband's early attempts to bond with the couple's son, Stephen. She cites a specific experience that later became the basis of the book. Stephen asked for a toy stuffed lion, but his father refused because he associated stuffed animals with femininity. Zolotow later purchased the item for Stephen behind her husband's back. Zolotow argues that denying young boys access to certain toys rejects fulfilment of genuine human instinct. Observing similar interactions between fathers and sons at local parks, Zolotow found inspiration in how men of the time period missed out on some of the pleasures of being closely involved with their children's early development. She observed, for example, that by always exiting the room during diaper changes, her husband missed their son's first smile. Such absences of early interaction between father and child, Zolotow believes, result in a breach in the foundation of the relationship.

== Summary ==
William's Doll follows the story of William, a young boy who wishes for a doll to care for. His father, uncomfortable with William's request, tries giving William toys that he considers to be more gender-appropriate, such as a basketball and a train set. William still enjoys these toys, practicing his basketball skills and playing with his train set for hours. He persists with his request for a doll, enduring taunting by his brother and other boys in the neighborhood. When William's grandmother comes to visit, William shows her the toys his father bought him, but mentions his continuing desire for a doll to care for. Finally, William's grandmother fulfills William's request, upsetting William's father. William's grandmother explains to William's father that the doll will allow for William to practice good parenting and grow into a great father just like him.

== Analysis ==
Numerous scholars analyze the use of William's Doll in the classroom. The impact of the book, a representation of non-traditional gender stereotypes in children, is significant in the classroom as a tool to address gender micro-inequalities, intolerance, and learning challenges faced by non-English speaking students. The effects of sexism are residual, especially in the classroom, the center of childhood socialization. Sex stereotyping by educators is reinforced by inequity of time, encouragement, difficulty of assignments, and expectation of success offered between male and female students, labeled "hidden curriculum." To counterbalance inherent inequity in the classroom, William's Doll is employed as a method through which educators may expose students to the concept of sex-stereotyping. Introducing relatable characters who are not stereotypically gender-conformant such as William allows for a source of new role models.

This method of exposure through children's literature has been employed by many marginalized populations. Representations of males such as William who are portrayed as having traditionally female characteristics have not been as easily welcomed. For example, to promote women's involvement in traditionally male-dominated careers, sports, and other interests, the Women's Movement witnessed a surge of empowering female characters in children's literature. A persistent lack of non-traditional male characters such as William is proposed to be a reflection of unchanging male stereotypes despite evolving popular opinion regarding gender roles. Dr. Cecilia Silva, a professor at Texas Christian University, claims society is oblivious to this "boy code," only prominent when characters such as William contravene. For many noncomformant males, the result of conforming with the "code" is low self-esteem and emotional growth obstacles.

Implementing William's Doll in the classroom is frequently proposed as a tool to assist children in identifying sex stereotyping, so it has become the focus of many classroom studies. Martha Goldstein-Schultz, a professor at the University of Connecticut, suggests family and consumer science classrooms as environments to promote discussions concerning sex stereotypes. She emphasizes the critical role schools play in childhood identity and sexuality development as platforms to encourage questions and acceptance through exposure to literature such as William's Doll. A study investigating student responses to a classroom read-aloud of William's Doll to a sample of young boys found that including literature with gender-uncomforant males elicits increased identification of textual interrelation.

== Reception and legacy ==
Considering the role of William's Doll in the classroom, scholars focus on teachers' reception of the book as they choose class readings. Julie Wollman-Bonilla, a graduate of Harvard University's Institute for Educational Management, identifies elementary teachers' lack of selection of nonmainstream titles such as William's Doll. She argues that every children's text presents a set of morals and endorses a specific code of conduct. Texts displaying white, middle-class American values are the prevailing choice among elementary school educators, neglecting books representing the perspective of marginalized populations on the basis of sex, race, or socioeconomic factors.

In Wollman-Bonilla's sample of teachers' reception, she found that most educators objected to texts representing gender-role reversal. In response to William's Doll, many teachers referenced their own parenting techniques as reasons to reject its use in the classroom. For example, many educators' responses aligned with this male teacher's assertion about the text: "I would never let my son play with a doll!" In general, male educators were more adverse to the use of William's Doll in their classrooms than female educators, although the dominant opinion across both genders was negative. Wollman-Bonilla identifies that opposition to William's Doll was mostly by gender-conformant people who endorse gender roles as a natural order. Books such as William's Doll suggest that sex stereotyping is an intrinsic societal issue that needs to be addressed.

=== Adaptations ===
A song based on the story, with music by Mary Rodgers and lyrics by Sheldon Harnick, was included in the best-selling Free to Be... You and Me children's album and songbook in 1972, where it was sung by Alan Alda and Marlo Thomas. The song was later sung by B. D. Wong at the Ms. Foundation's 15th Annual Gloria Awards ceremony in 2003, where Marlo Thomas and former Ms. Foundation president Letty Cottin Pogrebin received the Creative Philanthropy Award for the album's creation.

When Free to Be... You and Me became a television special in 1974, ABC asked producer Marlo Thomas to omit William's Doll for fear it would promote homosexuality. Thomas rejected the omission.

William's Doll also became a 14-minute film in 1981. The 1981 film starred Craig Salles as William and was shot in Graceada Park in Modesto, California. In 2010, the producers of RiffTrax, formerly Mystery Science Theater 3000, released William's Doll. This was their "riff" of the aforementioned short.
