= Sooner or Later (1979 film) =

- DVD cover
- Genre: Drama; Romance
- Written by: Bruce Hart; Carole Hart
- Directed by: Bruce Hart
- Starring: Denise Miller; Rex Smith; Barbara Feldon; Judd Hirsch
- Music by: Stephen Lawrence
- Country of origin: United States
- Original language: English

Production
- Producer: Carole Hart
- Production location: Yonkers, New York
- Cinematography: Edward R. Brown
- Editors: Eric Albertson; Patrick McMahon
- Running time: 100 minutes
- Production companies: NBC Productions; Laughing Willow

Original release
- Network: NBC
- Release: March 25, 1979

Sooner or Later is a 1979 American made-for-television teen romantic drama film directed by Bruce Hart, starring Denise Miller, Rex Smith (in his film debut), Barbara Feldon and Judd Hirsch which premiered on NBC on March 25, 1979.

As a then up-and-coming recording artist, Rex Smith became an overnight teen idol immediately following the film's telecast and he achieved pop star status in America with his hit single from the film's soundtrack entitled "You Take My Breath Away", which reached No. 10 on the Billboard Hot 100 and spent two weeks at No. 7 on the Cash Box Top 100.

== Plot ==
Jessie Walters (Denise Miller) is a buoyant 13-year-old girl who goes to the Eddie Nova Guitar Institute and is stunned to discover that her guitar instructor is Michael Skye (Rex Smith), a 17-year-old aspiring musician she has just seen play with his rock band (The Skye Band) at the local shopping mall in upstate New York and with whom she is instantly smitten.

Through the grace of make-up, Jessie enters the world of a 16-year-old, and she tells Michael that's her age when he gives her a ride home from class one week. They start to flirt. When Michael invites her to a band rehearsal, they kiss for the first time; when he invites her to a drive-in movie, things start moving just a little too fast, and Jessie has to quickly decide whether or not to confess.

== Cast ==
- Denise Miller as Jessie Walters
- Rex Smith as Michael Skye
- Barbara Feldon as Lois Walters
- Judd Hirsch as Bob Walters
- Lilia Skala as Grandma Esther
- Morey Amsterdam as Eddie Nova
- Vivian Blaine as Make-up Artist
- Lynn Redgrave as The Teacher

== Soundtrack ==
Rex Smith's self-titled LP, released by Columbia Records, is basically a soundtrack album featuring the pop/rock songs he performed in the film. The album's first four tracks are the soundtrack songs from the film composed by Stephen Lawrence and Bruce Hart:

1. "You Take My Breath Away"
2. "Sooner or Later"
3. "Simply Jessie"
4. "Better Than It's Ever Been Before"

== Production ==
In an interview, Rex Smith recalled his experience of achieving instant fame simultaneously with Sooner or Later and the hit single "You Take My Breath Away":

On March 25, 1979, my life changed overnight. I was one of the stars of a made-for-TV movie called Sooner or Later, along with Barbara Feldon and Denise Miller. In the film, I was a guitar instructor, and I fell for one of my young students who lied about her age (she was only thirteen). The movie was written and directed by Bruce Hart, who also wrote the Sesame Street theme. The day before the movie aired, I could walk the streets without being noticed, but that next day, I was literally swamped by five hundred girls when I tried to go shopping for clothes. Suddenly, I was this teen idol with a hit record from the film called "You Take My Breath Away", which I recorded for Columbia in one take. When it was played back in the studio, I said I needed to go to the bathroom. There, crying, I just knew I'd just recorded a big, big hit record. You can just tell. It was an amazing time in my life.

== Novelization ==
A paperback novelization of the film was written by Bruce and Carole Hart (based on their teleplay) and published by Avon Books as a promotional tie-in.

== Home media ==
On March 13, 2001, Sooner or Later was released on DVD in Region 1 by Henstooth Video.
