= Red Riding Hood (1987 film) =

- Directed by: Adam Brooks
- Written by: Carole Lucia Satrina
- Based on: "Little Red Riding Hood" by Charles Perrault and by Brothers Grimm
- Produced by: Yoram Globus; Menahem Golan
- Starring: Amelia Shankley; Isabella Rossellini; Craig T. Nelson; Rocco Sisto; Helen Glazary
- Cinematography: Yuri Neyman; Ye'ehi Shnegur
- Edited by: David Tour
- Music by: Stephen Lawrence
- Production company: Golan-Globus Productions
- Distributed by: Cannon Releasing Corp.
- Release dates: May 1987 (France: Cannes Film Market); 15 March 1989 (US: video premiere)
- Running time: 84 minutes
- Countries: Israel; United States
- Language: English

Red Riding Hood (alternatively: Cannon Movie Tales: Red Riding Hood) is a 1987 American/Israeli fantasy film by Golan-Globus based on the fairy tale of the same name and part of the film series Cannon Movie Tales.

== Plot ==
Young Linet (Amelia Shankley) explores the forest, looking for fairies. Unknown to her, she is pursued by a wolf. Sensing a threat, Linet calls for help and is rescued by her friend Peter the Woodsman, who asks why she can't be a good, obedient little girl. Linet answers that good little girls never get to see the world ("Lost in the Woods").

Returning Linet to her mother, Lady Jeanne (Isabella Rossellini), Peter remarks on how fearless Linet is. The two adults discuss Jeanne's missing husband, Lord Percival, and Percival's evil twin brother, Lord Godfrey, who now rules in Percival's absence. Jeanne and Linet live in the country to avoid Godfrey. At that moment, Godfrey himself (Craig T. Nelson) appears to remind Jeanne that today has been seven years since Percival went away to war, meaning that she is legally free to remarry. He offers to marry her, pointing out that he is identical to his brother and that he will allow her to return to her former position as lady of the castle, but she refuses, as she still loves Percival.

Later in the castle, Godfrey imprisons a peasant farmer, Allen Owen, for back taxes. As he is led away, Allen yells how Godfrey has no heart, which enrages Godfrey. He orders Allen to be hanged in the morning. Godfrey goes to his chambers where the wolf that pursued Linet is waiting. The wolf transforms into his human form, Dagger (Rocco Sisto), whose power Godfrey has given up his heart and soul to possess. Dagger says that the people of the country all fear Godfrey, except for Linet, who has no fear of anything. Godfrey demands that Dagger teach Linet to fear. Dagger boasts of his own wickedness ("Good at Being Bad").

Linet awakens from a nightmare about being chased by a large wolf. Lady Jeanne sings a lullaby reassuring her that her father will soon return and that there will be nothing to fear ("You Won't Be Here in the Morning").

Lady Jean goes to beg Godfrey for Allen's life. Godfrey agrees to spare him, but gives Allen forty lashes. Lady Jean's servants carry Allen out of the castle, and Jeanne sends Linet to fetch Nanny Bess, Jeanne's mother, who is a healer living deep in the forest. Nanny gathers some ointments and slips a red bundle into her basket. As they walk, they are watched by the Wolf. Nanny makes Linet wait outside while she and Lady Jeanne attend to Allen. Dagger tries to spy on them, but is inadvertently thwarted by Linet. Nanny's ointment miraculously heals Allen's injuries. Nanny holds a magical ceremony in which she presents Linet with a red hooded cloak, saying it will protect her from harm and help her to see a fairy.

The next day Linet and Jeanne bring bread to a healed Allen. Allen tells Linet how the land was once fertile ("Green in the Blue"). Everyone joins in singing and dancing, but the mood changes suddenly when Lord Godfrey appears and demands Jeanne marry him. Jeanne once more states that she still loves Percival, whom Godfrey declares is dead. Unafraid of her uncle, Linet boldly states that her father is alive, infuriating Godfrey.

Meanwhile, Percival (Craig T. Nelson in a double role) arrives at Nanny Bess's cottage ("You Won't Be Here in the Morning (Reprise)"). Nanny Bess explains how Godfrey gave up his heart for power and is now incapable of loving anything or anyone. She warns that Godfrey watches Jeanne too closely for Percival to return home safely, but promises to send for Linet in secret the following day so that Percival can see his daughter.

In the castle, Godfrey sings how Jeanne cannot break his heart, since he has none ("Man Without a Heart"), while vowing that she will be his. Dagger tells him about Allen's healing and postulates someone in the village is capable of magic. Godfrey sends Dagger to find out the source of the magic and to eliminate it.

Jean gives Linet a basket to take to Nanny Bess. Linet promises to go straight there, but Dagger meets her in the forest. They talk about how strangers lie and mislead others ("Never Talk to Strangers") and Linet accidentally reveals that Nanny Bess's magic healed Allen. Dagger distracts her into picking flowers and goes ahead to Nanny Bess. He arrives at the house and tries to attack her, but she escapes. Dagger then hears Linet approaching, so he darts inside and dons Nanny Bess' cap and nightgown. Linet arrives at the cottage, where Dagger, disguised, convinces her to drink a potion that alters her perception, causing her to believe he is really Nanny Bess. When she notes Dagger's "big teeth," Dagger transforms into the Wolf and pounces on her. Meanwhile, guards kidnap Jeanne and take her to the castle, where Godfrey demands she marry him.

Percival and the villagers plan to rescue Jeanne when Nanny Bess appears, screaming for help. Percival and the villagers return to Nanny Bess's cottage and discover Dagger trapped between his wolf and human forms. Nanny Bess orders the woodsman to cut open the wolf-creature's stomach, killing the monster and releasing an unharmed Linet, who was protected by her magic cloak.

The villagers storm the castle and Percival and Jeanne are reunited. Godfrey is discovered in his throne room, twisted with pain. Percival throws the wolf's skin at Godfrey and orders him to leave. As he staggers past the stunned villagers, Godfrey transforms into a wolf and flees into the forest.

As Nanny Bess, Percival, Jeanne, and Linet walk home, Linet wanders away, distracted by some flowers. As she picks them, she looks up to see a fairy. Percival calls for Linet, and the fairy vanishes. Linet runs to catch up to her family.

== Cast ==
- Amelia Shankley - Linet / Red Riding Hood
- Isabella Rossellini - Lady Jeanne
- Craig T. Nelson - Godfrey / Percival
- Rocco Sisto - Dagger
- Helen Glazary - Nanny Bess
- Linda Kaye - Badger Kate
- Amnon Meskin - Peter
- Julian Chagrin - Allen Owen
- Haim Zehavy - 1st guard
- Stuart Kingston - Villager
- Danny Segev - Villager
- Arie Moscuna - Villager
- Igor Borisov - Bartender

== Soundtrack ==
- "Lost in the Woods"

Performed by Amelia Shankley
Music by Stephen Lawrence
Lyrics by Michael Korie
Barclay Productions

- "Good at Being Bad"

Performed by Rocco Sisto
Music by Stephen Lawrence
Lyrics by Michael Korie
Barclay Productions

- "You Won't Be Here in the Morning"

Performed by Isabella Rossellini
Music by Stephen Lawrence
Lyrics by Michael Korie
Barclay Productions

- "Green in the Blue"

Performed by Julian Chagrin
Music by Stephen Lawrence
Lyrics by Michael Korie
Barclay Productions

- "You Won't Be Here in the Morning"

(Reprise)

Performed by Craig T. Nelson
Music by Stephen Lawrence
Lyrics by Michael Korie
Barclay Productions

- "Man Without a Heart"

Performed by Craig T. Nelson
Music by Stephen Lawrence
Lyrics by Michael Korie
Barclay Productions

- "Never Talk to Strangers"

Performed by Amelia Shankley and Rocco Sisto
Music by Stephen Lawrence
Lyrics by Michael Korie
Barclay Productions

== Reception ==
Rose Thompson of Radio Times awarded the film two stars out of five.

Joly Herman of Common Sense Media awarded the film three stars out of five.
