= A Little Princess (1986 serial) =

British-American miniseries (1986–1987)

- Genre: Period drama; Family
- Based on: A Little Princess by Frances Hodgson Burnett
- Screenplay by: Jeremy Burnham
- Directed by: Carol Wiseman
- Starring: Maureen Lipman; Amelia Shankley
- Theme music composer: Rachel Portman
- Countries of origin: United Kingdom; United States
- Original language: English
- No. of episodes: 6

Production
- Producer: Colin Shindler
- Cinematography: David Taylor
- Editor: Clayton Parker

Original release
- Network: LWT
- Release: 18 January – 22 February 1987

A Little Princess is a six-part British-American drama (based upon the 1905 novel A Little Princess by Frances Hodgson Burnett), directed by Carol Wiseman, and starring Amelia Shankley as Sara Crewe and Maureen Lipman as Miss Minchin. It was popular in Europe and Japan.

== Plot ==
Sara Crewe, the daughter of wealthy British aristocrat Ralph Crewe, has spent her entire life living in India after the death of her mother. Knowing she needs proper European schooling, her father brings Sara to an elite boarding school in London where her mother had been educated. Crewe spares no expense ensuring Sara will be as comfortable as possible while she is there. Before bringing Sarah to England, Crewe lends his old friend, Carrisford, a significant amount of his fortune to invest in a diamond mine in Africa.

Sara and her father arrive in London and meet the school's owner and headmistress, Miss Minchin and her sister and partner Amelia. After a tearful farewell, Sara's father departs and she begins her education. Sara quickly befriends most of the other students, including Lottie, a younger student Sara consoles for having lost her mother, and Ermengarde, a shy girl often made fun of for her weight; but is actively disliked by Lavinia and Jessie, who envy Sara her wealth and luxuries and resent her being occasionally favoured by Miss Minchin. Sara also befriends the seminary's servant girl, Becky, who is ignored by everyone else and bullied and overworked, as well as deprived of meals by the cook and housemaid. Upon his return to India, Crewe becomes ill with fever and increasingly declines. While at his estate in India, he receives a letter from Carrisford, regretfully informing him that the diamond mine was empty, and that his fortune has been lost. The stress of the loss and what it will mean for his daughter worsens his illness and he succumbs and dies. Shortly after, in London, Miss Minchin is informed by Crewe's lawyer that he has died a penniless pauper and she will be receiving no money henceforth due to Crewe's bankruptcy, as well as leaving Sara an orphan. Minchin had amassed heavy expenses for Sara's birthday with lavish gifts and decorations, having hoped to extort more money from her father, and is furious when she finds out she'll have to pay for them out of her own pocket. Since Sara has no living relatives, Minchin considers throwing Sara out on the street, but is advised against this by Crewe's lawyer, who reminds her how poorly it would affect her reputation.

She decides to turn Sara into a servant, making her clean and work in the school where she was once a student. Sara is moved out of her luxurious room and loses her maid and belongings and sent to live in the adjoining attic to Becky. She continues to be kind and gracious to everyone, even to Miss Minchin, despite her dire circumstances and heartless cruelty and overwork by the cook. One wet and cold day, Sara is sent out to run errands and spots a fourpenny piece on the ground. Cold and hungry, she uses it to buy six buns from a nearby bakery, giving five to a beggar girl she meets and leaving only one for herself.

Meanwhile, Crewe's friend, Carrisford, had received false reports about the diamond mine. It was, in fact, a great investment containing many diamonds, making him very wealthy. Knowing that half of the diamond fortune belongs to his friend, he immediately tries to contact him. Upon finding that Crewe has died, Carrisford, distraught and increasingly despondent and ill himself, begins searching for Sara. Carrisford moves to London and purchases the home next door to Miss Minchin's school. He has never met Sara and only knows that she was taken by her father to attend a boarding school somewhere in Europe. Crewe never informed him exactly where Sara was attending school, so he had no clue where to begin to look for her. Carrisford's enlists his solicitor, Carmichael (whose children coincidentally have periodic interactions with Sara as they live opposite Miss Minchin's) start searching schools all over Europe in hopes of finding her. After searching numerous cities, including Paris, St. Petersburg, Lisbon, and Vienna, Carmichael says he cannot make any more trips himself. Carrisford remains guilt-ridden over what happened to his friend, and vows to keep looking until he finds Sara.

One morning, a small monkey finds his way through the open window into Sara's attic room. The monkey belongs to Ram Dass, Carrisford's Indian servant. Ram Dass, upon seeing the cold, damp and fireless room Sara occupies, and how thin, pale and starved she is—tells Carrisford about her. Wishing to help her in some way to atone for not finding Sara, he arranges through Ram Dass to provide her with a fire, warm bedding and clothes, and nourishing meals, which a grateful and wondrous Sara shares with Becky. Both girls think it is magic, or someone anonymous. After the monkey once again escapes to Sara's room, she brings him next door to return him. Carrisford and Carmichael, who had just informed Carrisford of his inability to discover Sara in Russia as they had hoped, meet Sara. While explaining about how the monkey came to her room, Sara remarks about Ram Dass being a Sikh and how he calls his monkey "the evil one." Immediately Carrisford is intrigued and asks her how she knows Ram Dass is a Sikh. Sara replies that she met many Sikhs while growing up in India, and that she was born there. Half in fear and half in hopefulness, he enlists Carmichael to question her. Inquired by Carmichael as to how she came to be a servant at the school, she tells him how she used to be a pupil, but became a servant when a friend lost all of her father's money, just before he died. Sara notices the statue of Kali in Carrisford's parlour, and says it looks just like one her father had owned. When Carrisford asks what her father's name was, she tells him, "Crewe...Ralph Crewe." Stunned, Carrisford tells her the statue actually was her father's, that he is the friend whom she had thought lost her father's fortune, and that he has been searching all over Europe for her. Yet all this time, she had been just next door. Sara is astonished and happy. Both cannot believe that they were so close and the coincidence of their being united by chance and circumstance.

Carrisford tells Sara that half of his large fortune rightfully belongs to her; that she will live with him, and that she doesn't have to return to the school. He tells Sara that he will arrange private tutors to finish her schooling. Miss Minchin arrives to chastise Sara for intruding on Carrisford, threatening punishment and demands that she return to the school at once. Carmichael intervenes and explains the situation, and Carrisford censures Minchin for her cruelty. After Sara refuses to return to the school, a bitterly disappointed Miss Minchin leaves in anger and accuses Sara of being ungrateful and thinking that she was a "princess." Sara replies that she never thought she was - only that she tried to behave like one. Carrisford and Sara also arrange for Becky to leave Miss Minchin's service and become Sara's personal maid. Contemplating her difficult experience and determining that it was God's way of teaching her a lesson, Sara is determined to help the poor as much as she is able, knowing how hard it is to be penniless and alone. After wishing to find what happened to the little girl with whom Sara had shared her buns with, she and Carrisford visit the bakery - to happily find that the girl - Anne - is now the baker's apprentice, the baker having taken her in after witnessing Sara's kind act. The girls greet each other with happiness, Sara content knowing that Anne's life and future has changed for the better.

== Cast ==
- Maureen Lipman as Miss Minchin
- Amelia Shankley as Sara Crewe
- Miriam Margolyes as Miss Amelia Minchin
- Annette Badland as Cook
- Natalie Abbott as Becky
- Alison Reynolds as Ermengarde
- Katrina Heath as Lavinia
- Joanna Dukes as Jessie
- Johanna Hargreaves as Henrietta
- Jessica Simpson as Lottie
- Nigel Havers as Carrisford
- David Yelland as Ralph Crewe
- John Bird as Mr Carmichael
- Annie Lambert as Mrs Carmichael
- Antony Zaki as Ram Dass
- Meera Syal as Anna

== Awards ==
Winner:

- 1988 - BAFTA Award for Best Children's Programme (Entertainment/Drama)
