= Festival of Fools =

Annual street festival in Belfast, Northern Ireland

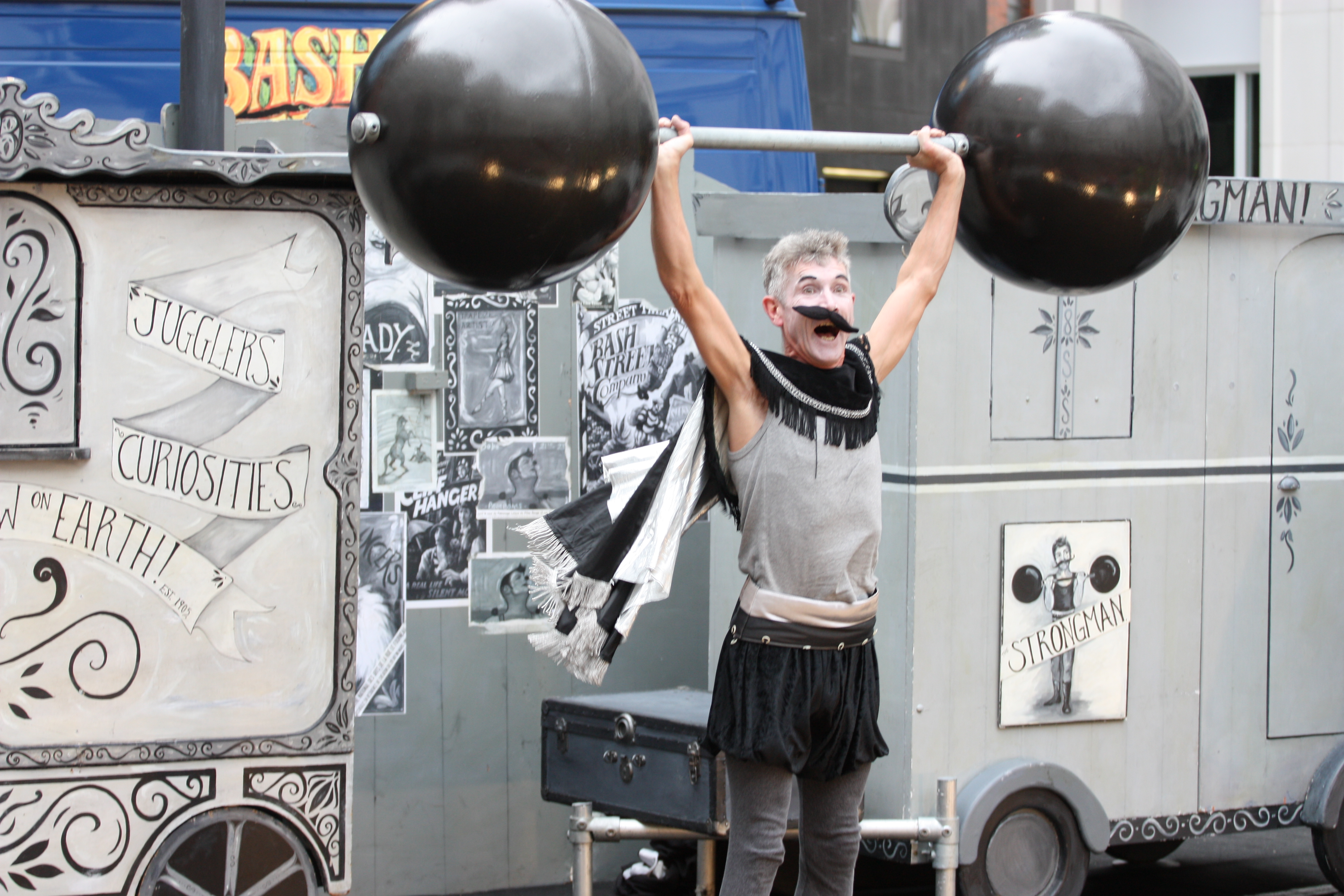
- Bash Street Theatre Company performing at Festival of Fools, Belfast, May 2013
- Genre: Street festival
- Locations: Belfast, Northern Ireland
- Coordinates: 54.6020°N 5.9262°W
- Founded: 2004
- Website: www.foolsfestival.com

The Festival of Fools is an annual Street Festival held in Belfast, Northern Ireland, usually during the May Bank Holiday weekend. It first started in 2004 and includes performances from around the world. Performers are paid a fixed amount and money collected from audiences at the end of each show is used to fund the next years show.

Previous to that, the annual International Festival of Fools, created by the Friends Roadshow went on from 1975 to 1984 in Amsterdam. It was a "comedy convention of the Nouveau Clowns".

The London Critics Group held an annual show called the Festival of Fools. Running over Christmas they satirised events of the previous year whilst including folklore and customs of each month. They were written by Ewan MacColl, staged in the back room of a North London pub, The New Merlin's Cave, and ran for five years in the late 1960s and early 1970s.
