= Pflasterspektakel =

Coordinates: 48.3055°N 14.2867°E

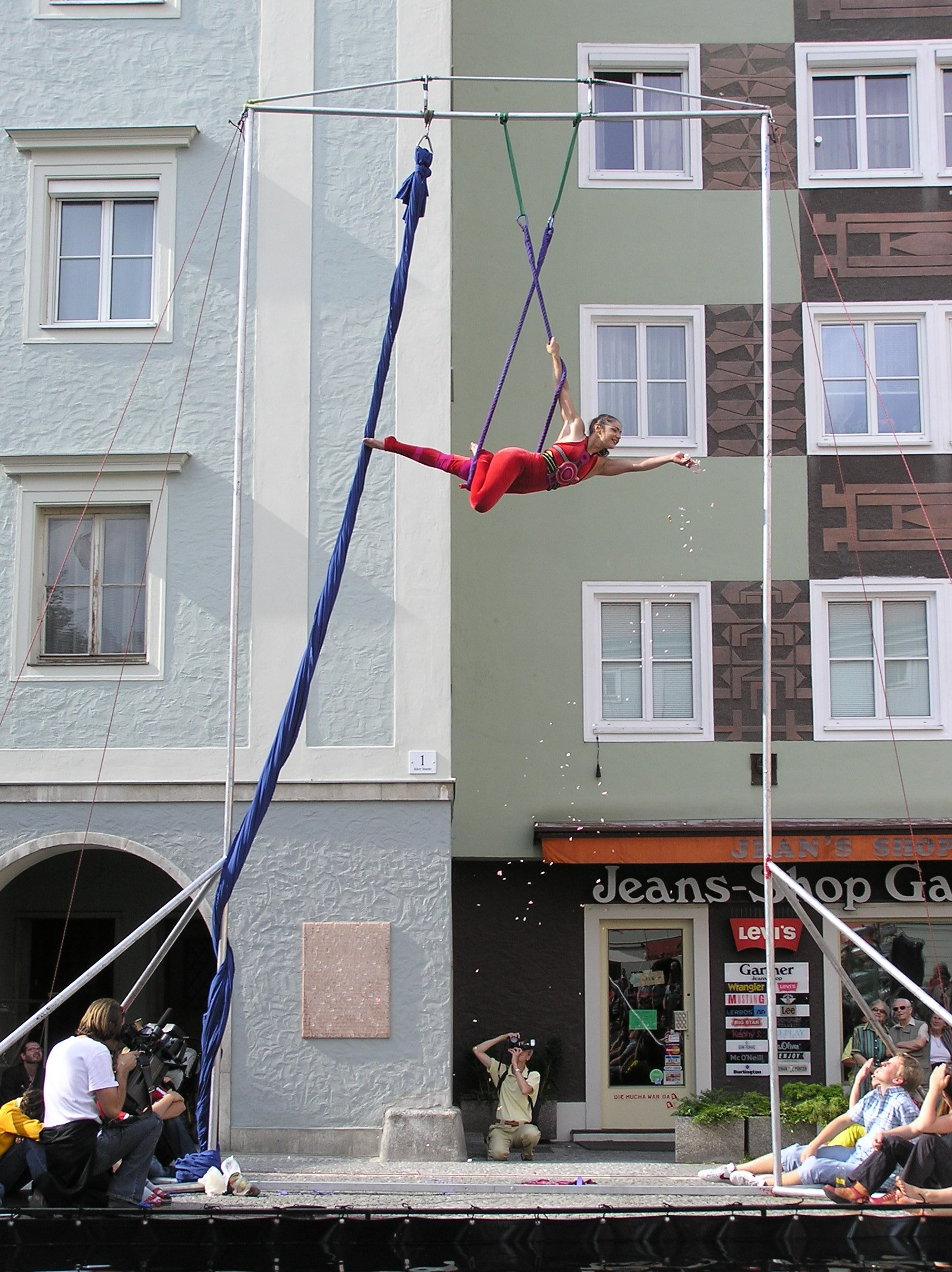
- A trapeze artist from Australia at the Pflasterspektakel 2005
- Locations: Linz, Austria
- Years active: 39
- Founded: 16 July 1987
- Attendance: over 200,000
- Website: www.pflasterspektakel.at

The Pflasterspektakel (pronounced [ˈpflastɐʃpɛkˌtakl̩], German for pavement spectacle) is an annual street art festival in Linz, the capital of Upper Austria. It includes musical acts, juggling, acrobatics, pantomime, improvisational theatre, clownery, fire dancing, painting, samba parades, as well as a programme for children, and is held on three days in July in and around the main square and the Landstraße. In 2010, about 400 artists from over forty nations participated in the event.

== History ==
The Pflasterspektakel was created by Siegbert Janko, cultural manager of Linz since 1985. He ascribes the idea to his impressions of Djemaa el Fna, a market place in Marrakesh, which he visited during birthday celebrations for King Hassan II of Morocco before 1985.

The inaugural festival took place from 16 to 19 July 1987, under the name of Internationale Straßenmusikantentage (International Street Musicians' Days). It comprised about 150 musicians, most of them from Austria and Germany, including a samba group from Munich. It was decided that the event should be repeated the following year, this time under the present name of Linz Pflasterspektakel and featuring acrobats, magicians and mimes in addition to the musicians.

1989, shortly before the fall of the Berlin Wall, artists from Eastern Bloc countries performed in Linz. From this year onwards, organisers had to select artists because there were more applications than could be accommodated. In 2000, as well as some of the following years, over 250,000 visitors attended the Pflasterspektakel to see artists from Europe, the Americas, Asia, Africa, and Australia.

== Time and locations ==
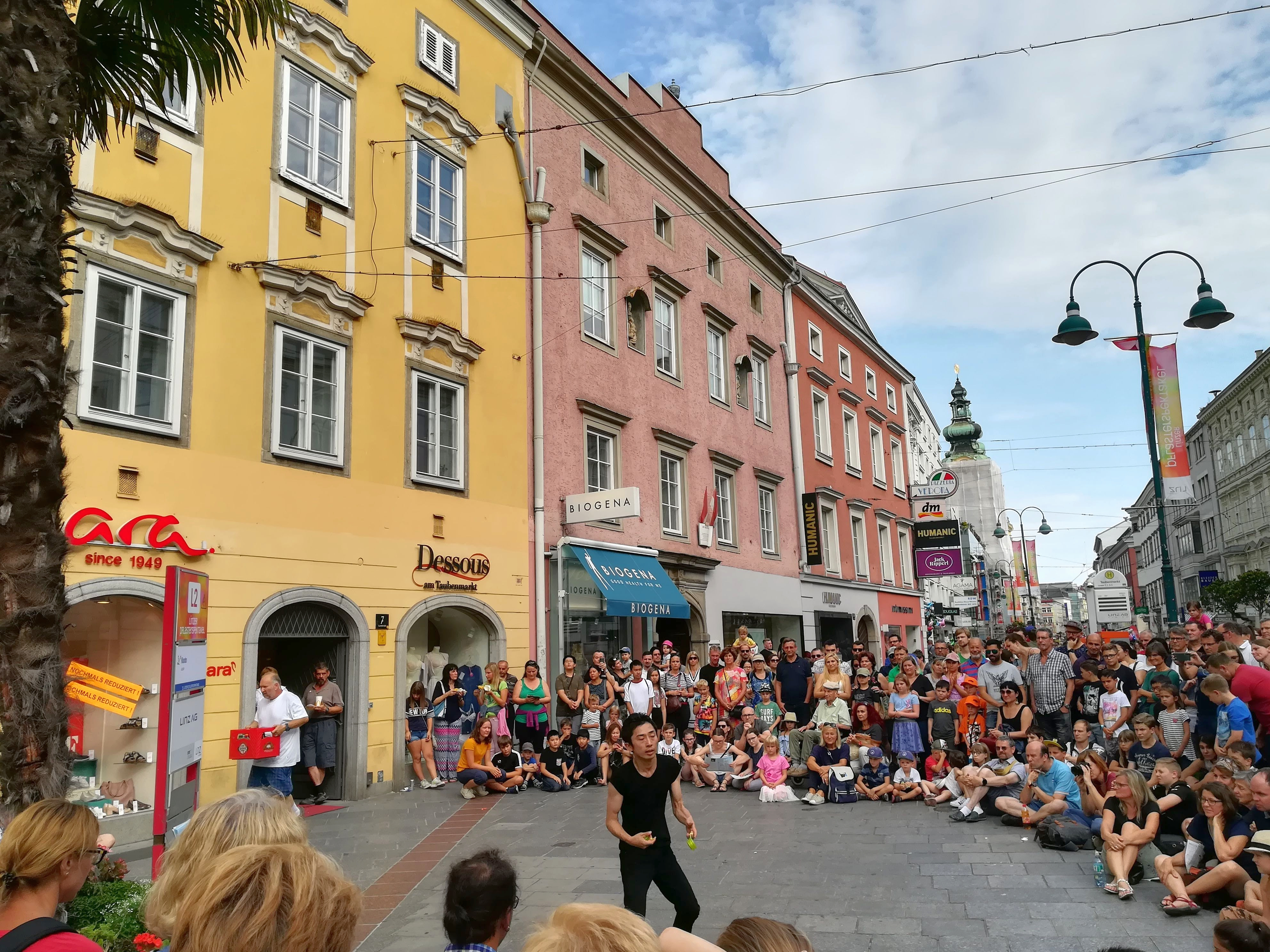
Yo-Yo-artist Naoto, Pflasterspektakel 2019

The Pflasterspektakel takes place on three days during the second half of July. The opening ceremony is held on a Thursday at 4 p.m.; on the following Friday and Saturday, the festival starts at 2 p.m. Closing time is at midnight each day, but some musicians play in pubs until 1 a.m. By tradition, spontaneously formed groups of artists improvise a finale (or several finales) on Saturday evening on the main square.

Artists are performing at around forty locations throughout the city of Linz, in and around the main square and the Landstraße. Two courtyards are reserved for musicians playing unplugged or a cappella. In case of rain, the event moves to the old city hall and other indoor locations.

== Funding ==
The event is sponsored by the municipality as well as LINZ AG, local newspapers and a bank. The artists are only paid for their travel costs, accommodation, breakfast, and 25 euros of cash per day for their expenses. Their main income is derived from visitors' donations.
