= Denise Miller =

American actress

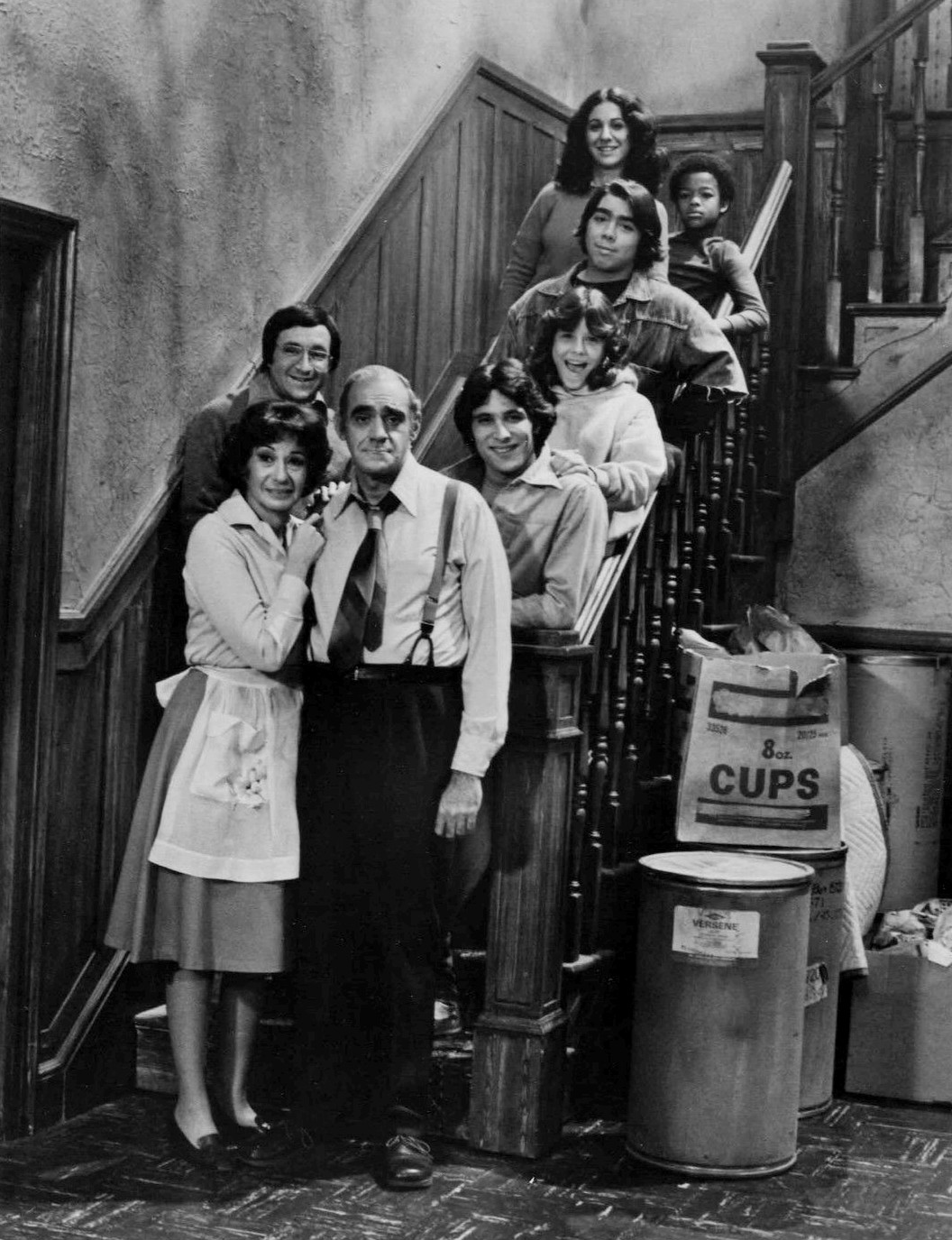
- Cast of TV's Fish (1977), from top: Todd Bridges, Sarah Natoli, John Cassisi, Denise Miller, Lenny Barry, Barry Gordon, Florence Stanley, Abe Vigoda
- Born: July 17, 1963 (age 63); Brooklyn, New York, U.S.
- Occupation: Actress
- Years active: 1974–2003
- Known for: Archie Bunker's Place; Fish; Sooner or Later

Denise Miller (born July 17, 1963) is an American actress. She is noted for her appearances in the television sitcoms Archie Bunker's Place and Fish, as well as the television film Sooner or Later.

Miller was born in Brooklyn. She started her acting career at age 11, taking lessons with Sylvia Leigh, that led to jobs with Sears Roebuck and a portrayal of Helen Keller in an Exxon Bicentennial advertisement. Miller can also be seen in episodes of Charles in Charge and Barney Miller. She played Tina Manucci on the 1979 sitcom Makin' It.

Miller graduated from a Catholic high school in Brooklyn.

== Filmography ==
Year	Title	Role	Notes
1976–1977	Barney Miller	Jilly Papalardo	3 episodes
1977–1978	Fish	Jilly Papalardo	35 episodes
1979	Jennifer's Journey	Jennifer	7 episodes
1979	Makin' It	Tina Manucci	9 episodes
1979	Sooner or Later	Jessie Walters	TV film
1981	Every Stray Dog and Kid	Jenny Baxter	TV pilot episode
1981–1983	Archie Bunker's Place	Billie Bunker	45 episodes
1982	The Love Boat	Abigail Hensinger, Vanessa Heinsley	2 episodes
1982–1983	The (New) $25,000 Pyramid	Herself	Various episodes
1983	Battle of the Video Games	Herself	
1983	Battle of the Network Stars XIV	Self - CBS Team	
1983	Knight Rider	Carrie Haver	Episode: "Custom K.I.T.T."
1985	Private Sessions	Angie	TV film
1989–1990	Charles in Charge	Tiffany Kovac	2 episodes
1991	She-Wolf of London	Matchmaker	Episode: "Heart Attack"
1991	In the Heat of the Night	Francie Miller	Episode: "The Littlest Victim"
1992	Silk Stalkings	Mrs. Hammond	Episode: "Internal Affair"
1992	Likely Suspects	Karen Doyle	Episode: "Pilot"
1993	FBI: The Untold Stories	Susan	Episode: "Copnap"
1993	Murder, She Wrote	Betty O'Hara	Episode: "The Petrified Florist"
1994	Duckman	Additional voices	Episode: "About Face"
1995	Platypus Man	Paige McAllister	13 episodes
1996	Diagnosis: Murder	Cheryl Dante	Episode: "Living on the Streets Can Be Murder"
2003	April's Shower	Vicki	Feature film
