= Stephen J. Lawrence =

American composer (1939–2021)

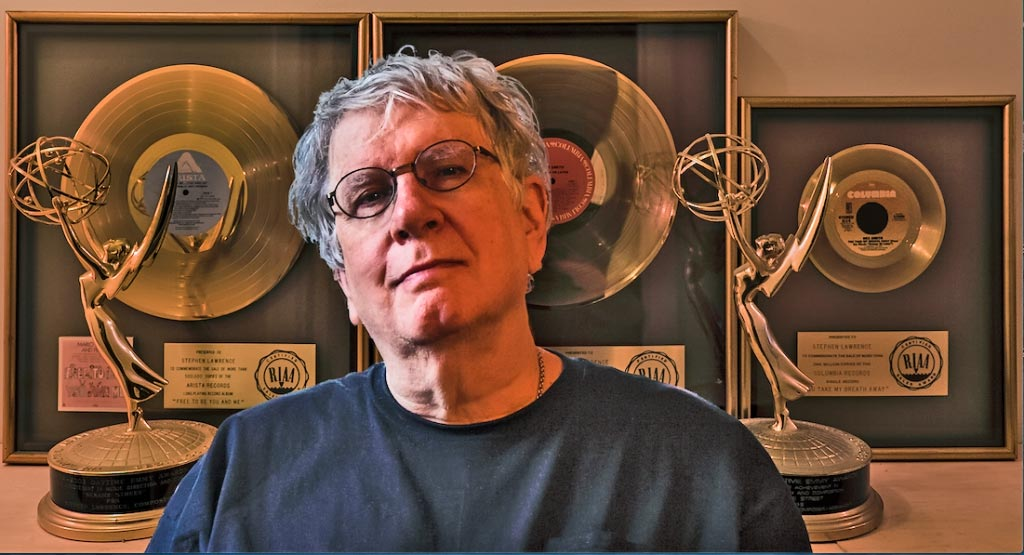

Stephen J. Lawrence (September 5, 1939 – December 30, 2021) was an American composer, who lived and worked in New York City. He was also known as Stephen Lawrence, but used his middle initial to differentiate him from the singer Steve Lawrence.

== Early life and career ==
Lawrence was born on September 5, 1939. He gained his B.A. in music from Hofstra University and during his lifetime composed more than 300 songs and scores for Sesame Street, resulting in three Emmy Awards for Outstanding Achievement in Music Direction and Composition.

Lawrence also composed the title song and four others for Marlo Thomas's ABC television special Free to Be... You and Me. He composed You Take My Breath Away, and scored the 1973 Robert De Niro movie Bang the Drum Slowly and Alice, Sweet Alice (1976), which won the music award at the Paris International Festival of Fantasy and Science Fiction.

Lawrence composed the score for One Summer Love (1976), a.k.a. Dragonfly, and composed the songs and score for the 1989 live-action movie musical Red Riding Hood. He composed songs for the live-action movie musical The Emperor's New Clothes; he also composed songs and score for The Tale of Peter Rabbit, an HBO animated musical starring Carol Burnett, lyrics by Sheldon Harnick.

== Personal life and death ==
Lawrence married Christine Jones in 1984, and their daughter Hannah was born two years later. After divorcing, he then married Cathy Schwartzman in 2002. He was the music director of Temple Sinai, Stamford, Connecticut, from that year until 2012. Lawrence died in Belleville, New Jersey, on December 30, 2021, at the age of 82.

== Awards and nominations ==
- Three Emmy Awards: Outstanding Music Direction and Composition, Sesame Street 1989-1990, 2001-2002, and 2002-2003.
- Emmy nominations for Sesame Street: 2008, 2004, 1999-2001, 1995-1997, 1994-1995, 1989-1990.
- Emmy certificate for Free To Be...You And Me, 1974.
- Emmy certificate for Hot Hero Sandwich (Title Song), 1979-1980.
- Gold Single for "You Take My Breath Away" - Sales of one million records. 1978. Sung by Rex Smith. Lyrics by Bruce Hart.
- Gold Album for Free to Be... You and Me - Composed the title song and four others for Marlo Thomas's Free to Be... You and Me, the ABC television special (1972). Musical Director.
- Gold Record for Sooner Or Later, the soundtrack of the 1979 NBC TV movie which included "You Take My Breath Away", signifying sales of 500,000 copies.
- Music Award from the Paris International Film Festival of Fantasy and Science Fiction for Alice, Sweet Alice (also known as 'Communion').

== TV credits ==
- Sesame Street Television series. Composed over 300 songs and scores. Won three Emmys for “Outstanding Achievement in Music Direction and Composition. Arranger and Conductor. 1984-2012.
- Free to Be... You and Me. ABC television special based on the record and book, 1974. Composed title song and four others; Musical Director and Arranger.
- Sooner or Later. NBC television movie, 1979. Composed original songs and score.
- It Happened One Christmas. Universal/ABC television movie, 1977; starring Marlo Thomas and Orson Welles. Composed score.
- Sesame Street Jam: A Musical Celebration. Sesame Street musical special, 1993-1994. Composed songs.
- Sesame Street Celebrates Around the World. Sesame Street New Year's Eve television special, 1993. Composed songs and score.
- Don't Eat the Pictures: Sesame Street at the Metropolitan Museum of Art. Sesame Street television special, 1983. Composed songs.
- The Wubbulous World of Dr. Seuss. Jim Henson Productions and Nickelodeon television series, 1996–97. Composed score.
- "The Tale of Peter Rabbit". An episode of HBO's Storybook Musicals series, an animated musical starring Carol Burnett. Lyrics by Sheldon Harnick. Written by Tony Geiss. Composed songs and score.
- Trackdown: Finding the Goodbar Killer – TV movie, Produced by Grosso-Jacobson. Composed score.
- Thanksgiving in the Land of Oz – Animated television special that aired on CBS in 1980. Starring Sid Caesar. Composed songs and score.
- Hothouse – Lorimar/|ABC television series. Composed score.
- Feeling Good – Children's Television Workshop series. 1971-1972. Composer and music director.

== Film credits ==
- Jennifer on My Mind (1971) starring Michael Brandon and Tippy Walker. Composed score.
- Hurry Up, or I'll Be 30 (1973) starring Danny DeVito. Composed score.
- Bang the Drum Slowly (1973) starring Robert De Niro, Michael Moriarty and Vincent Gardenia. Composed original score and arranged additional music.
- One Summer Love (1976), also released as Dragonfly, starring Susan Sarandon and Beau Bridges. Composed score.
- Alice, Sweet Alice (1976), also known as Communion, starring Brooke Shields. Composed score.
- Mirrors (1978) starring Kitty Winn. Composed score.
- The Emperor's New Clothes (1987). Live action musical starring Sid Caesar and Robert Morse. Composed songs. Lyrics by Michael Korie.
- Red Riding Hood (1989). Live action musical starring Isabella Rossellini and Craig T. Nelson. Composed songs and score. Lyrics by Michael Korie.
- Music supervisor for seven live action feature musicals: Cannon MovieTales.

== Theater ==
- Now Is The Time For All Good Men. 1967. Music Director and Co-Orchestrator.
- Composed incidental music for Little Duck by Billy Aronson at Ensemble Studio Theater. 2009
- Composed three songs for A... My Name Is Alice. Outer Critics Drama Award.
- Composed incidental music for the Broadway play The Big Love starring Tracey Ullman.
- Composed incidental score for Manhattan Theater Club production of Some People, Some Other People, And What They Finally Do.
- Composed score for No Dogs Allowed, a children's musical. Book by Sonia Manzano, Lyrics by Billy Aronson. Commissioned by Actor's Playhouse, Coral Gables, Florida 2006. Revived 2008. New production at Atlantic Theater Company, New York City 2009.
- Composed songs for American history musicals for children for his company, Quill Entertainment Company. Shows include: Everybody's Watching: The Making of the Constitution, Glory Road (Harriet Tubman and the Underground Railroad), Dream (Martin Luther King Jr. and the Montgomery bus boycott), Paul Revere Rides Again
- Blue Roses (based on The Glass Menagerie). 2014. Orchestration consultant.
