= Bruce Hart (songwriter) =

American songwriter and screenwriter (1938–2006)

- Born: January 15, 1938; New York City, U.S.
- Died: February 21, 2006 (aged 68); New York City, U.S.
- Education: . Syracuse University
- Occupations: Songwriter, screenwriter
- Known for: Writing Sesame Street theme song
- Spouse: Carole Hart (m. 1963)
- Awards: Emmy Award for writing the Sesame Street pilot (1970)

Bruce Hart (January 15, 1938 – February 21, 2006) was an American songwriter and screenwriter perhaps best known for composing the lyrics to the theme song to the children's TV series Sesame Street.

== Biography ==
Hart was born in New York City, grew up in Watertown, New York, and completed an arts degree at Syracuse University. After graduation, he wrote material for Carl Ballantine and Larry Hankin, and also for the Charles Playhouse in Boston.

Hart starting writing sketches for Sesame Street with his wife Carole after the program made its debut in 1969. He won an Emmy in 1970 for the pilot of Sesame Street titled "Sally Sees Sesame Street". He cowrote the theme song with Joe Raposo and Jon Stone. Hart wrote the lyrics for Marlo Thomas's Free to Be... You and Me from an album and television special of the same name in the early 1970s. Michael Jackson and Harry Belafonte also featured on both the album and special.

Hart's other writings include "One Way Ticket" which became a hit for Cass Elliot. With his wife Carole, he produced an Emmy Award–winning show for adolescents, Hot Hero Sandwich, which appeared on NBC in 1979. The Harts also wrote, directed, and produced the television movie Sooner or Later, which appeared on NBC in 1979. The couple also co-wrote several books, including Sooner or Later, published in 1978, and Waiting Games in 1981.
