= Once Upon a Sesame Street Christmas =

Sesame Street Christmas special

Once Upon a Sesame Street Christmas is a one-hour Sesame Street Christmas special that first aired on HBO on November 25, 2016, and on November 22, 2017, on PBS. It was the franchise's first Christmas special in ten years.

== Plot ==
On Christmas Eve, Elmo's father Louie tells his son about how Sesame Street was a dreary place in the 19th century as its inhabitants lack the Christmas spirit enough for Santa Claus to not make a stop there and is enforced by a constable that is Mr. Johnson's ancestor. Elmo's great-great-great-grandfather of the same name has moved there as he works to get everyone into the Christmas spirit with the help of some Sesame Street inhabitants that support his motives.

== Cast ==
- Jim Gaffigan as Santa Claus
- Zosia Mamet as Bella
- Audra McDonald as Caroler
- Alan Muraoka as Alan
- Suki Lopez as Nina

=== Muppet performers ===
- Pam Arciero
- Billy Barkhurst as Ernie
- Jennifer Barnhart as Holly
- Tyler Bunch as Louie
- Leslie Carrara-Rudolph as Abby Cadabby, Becky
- Frankie Cordero
- Stephanie D'Abruzzo
- Ryan Dillon as Elmo
- Jamie Donmoyer
- Liz Hara
- Chris Thomas Hayes
- Haley Jenkins
- Eric Jacobson as Bert, Grover, Two-Headed Monster (Left head); Oscar the Grouch (puppetry only)
- Kathleen Kim
- Tim Lagasse
- Spencer Lott
- Lara MacLean
- Joey Mazzarino
- Andrew Moriarty
- Carmen Osbahr as Rosita
- Martin P. Robinson as Hot Pink Muppet Elf
- David Rudman as Cookie Monster, Two-Headed Monster (Right head)
- Caroll Spinney as Big Bird and Oscar the Grouch (voices only)
- Matt Vogel as Count von Count, Constable, Big Bird (puppetry only)

== Reception ==
In The New York Times, Neil Genzlinger called the special "pleasant and witty" and noted that the casting of Zosia Mamet, a series regular on HBO's Girls, reflected Sesame Street having moved from PBS to HBO earlier in 2016.

Genzlinger wrote that while other holidays got brief attention, the focus was on Christmas. Zack Teibloom mentioned that he enjoyed Mamet offering "a Chanukkah lesson for balance." In a 2017 interview, Caroll Spinney cited the special as an example of how Sesame Street sometimes engages with spiritual values.

In Mashable, Annie Colbert noted David Gallo's sets, which "took modern Sesame Street back to the 19th century with sepia tones, ivy-covered iron gates and laundry dangling by clothespins over the familiar cobblestone."

== Awards ==
The show won the 2017 Primetime Emmy Award for Outstanding Children's Program. Writers Geri Cole and Ken Scarborough won a WGA Award for their script at the 69th Writers Guild of America Awards.

== In other media ==
A tie-in book of the same title was also published in 2017. Written by Geri Cole and adapted by Robin Newman, it was illustrated by Tom Brannon. The special was released on DVD as part of Sesame Street: My Favorite Holidays.

== Songs ==
- "Holiday Lights"
- "Let Santa Know We're Here"
- "Two is You and Me"
- "Deck the Halls"
- "Kindness"
