= Panwapa =

- Genre: Children's
- Created by: Sesame Workshop
- Written by: Annie Evans
- Directed by: Lisa Simon
- Starring: Kevin Clash; Joey Mazzarino; Leslie Carrara-Rudolph; Carmen Osbahr
- Voices of: Boitumelo Betty Maretle; Nigel Plaskitt
- Country of origin: United States
- Original language: English
- No. of seasons: 1
- No. of episodes: 12

Production
- Executive producers: Kevin Clash; Liz Nealon
- Producer: Frank Campagna
- Running time: 47 minutes
- Production companies: Sesame Workshop; The Merrill Lynch Foundation

Original release
- Network: PBS Kids Sprout
- Release: January 19, 2008 – August 6, 2009

Panwapa is an American children's television series. It is co-produced by the Merrill Lynch Foundation and Sesame Workshop, the latter of which supplied the cast of puppets. The series was first released online via iTunes in 2007 and later premiered on PBS Kids Sprout in January 2008.

== Plot ==
A Panwapa Kid card, depicting a Kid from Canada whose interests are: tacos, cats, scooters, doumbek, cooking and Mexican masks.

Panwapa Island is a giant island that can freely float across planet Earth's oceans. This allows the residents of the island to visit freely with children from many lands and explore differing cultures.

== Characters ==
- Azibo the Monster (performed by Kevin Clash) – The main character of the series. He is a green monster, who loves soccer and his favorite food is noodles with spice. When he first arrived on Panwapa Island, the other characters were afraid of him until Athena managed to convince him to keep trying to make friends with them which actually worked. In return, Azibo's new friends build him a palm frond shack on the beach.
- Bill the Bug (performed by Joey Mazzarino) – A bug who tracks the location of Panwapa Island on the community globe. He is the inventor and go-to guy for gadgets and information. Bill lives in a tree house crammed full of objects he's collected over the years. Bill is a recycled version of Bug from The Adventures of Elmo in Grouchland.
- Athena the Owl (performed by Fran Brill and voiced by Boitumelo Betty Maretle) – A female owl who acts the guide of Panwapa Island. She lives in a tree in a comfortable nest near the community area. Athena is the niece of the Sesame Street character Hoots the Owl; Hoots also has a granddaughter named Athena.
- Koko the Penguin (performed by Leslie Carrara-Rudolph) – A female penguin that wears pink sunglasses and enjoys badminton. She lives in a quaint cottage near the community area with a garden that she tends with great love and attention. After meeting Azibo and finally becoming friends with him, Koko helped Azibo to build his house.
- Tungar the Tiger (performed by Martin P. Robinson and voiced by Nigel Plaskitt) – A tiger who coaches the new sheep players in the art of football including his specialty...the subtleties of head passing. He lives in a cave near the stream. Tungar is a recycled version of Butch the Tiger from The Muppet Show.
- Baabra Sheep (performed by Carmen Osbahr) – Baabra Sheep and her two children came to Panwapa Island to live there and can only speak sheep language. Baabra and her family were displaced by a circus until they came to Panwapa Island. They live in a modest house on the football field where they help by eating the grass. Baabra and her children have a habit of baaing to the sun each month.

== Episodes ==
- Hello Panwapa Island!
- Speaking Like Sheep
- Baa to the Sun, Sing to the Moon
- Snow Story

== Cast ==
=== Puppeteers ===
- Pam Arciero
- Fran Brill – Athena the Owl (puppeteer)
- Leslie Carrara-Rudolph – Koko the Penguin, Sheep Kid #2
- Kevin Clash – Azibo the Monster
- Joey Mazzarino – Bill the Bug
- Carmen Osbahr – Baabra Sheep
- Martin P. Robinson – Tungar the Tiger (puppeteer)
- Matt Vogel – Sheep Kid #1

=== Voices ===
- Boitumelo Betty Maretele – Athena the Owl
- Nigel Plaskitt – Tungar the Tiger

== Later appearances ==
- The puppet for Tungar the Tiger appeared in some episodes of Sesame Street as a normal tiger with one of these appearances being in the "Wild Animals" episode of "Elmo's World." Some of the recent instances had Tungar the Tiger's puppet performed by Matt Vogel.
- For the week of 14–21 October 2008, Koko appeared with Abby Cadabby on the Sesame Street website, to mark Wild Animal Day. Abby was trying to summon a tiger only for Koko to appear stating that Tungar is unavailable.
- Matt Vogel also performed the puppet for Tungar the Tiger which appeared in the Sesame Street Spaghetti Space Chase attraction.
- The puppet for Azibo was recycled in The Furchester Hotel episode "Monster Pox" as Mr. Cuddles, and as Elmo's cousin Marty in Episode 4812.
