= The Furchester Hotel =

- Genre: Educational television, Puppetery
- Created by: Belinda Ward
- Developed by: Belinda Ward
- Written by: Belinda Ward (lead writer)
- Directed by: Jack Jameson, Helen Scott, Richard Bradley, Simon Gibney, Julian Kemp
- Starring: Sarah Burgess; Ryan Dillon; Louise Gold; Andrew Spooner; David Rudman; Mak Wilson; Neil Sterenberg; Warrick Brownlow-Pike
- Theme music composer: Andy Blythe and Marten Joustra
- Opening theme: "Welcome to the Furchester"
- Ending theme: "Farewell from the Furchester"
- Countries of origin: United Kingdom; United States
- No. of seasons: 2
- No. of episodes: 103

Production
- Executive producers: Tony Reed; Carol-Lynn Parente
- Producers: David Collier; Dionne Nosek; Rob Jenkinson
- Production location: Dock10
- Running time: 11 minutes
- Production companies: Sesame Workshop; CBeebies Production; BBC

Original release
- Network: CBeebies
- Release: 26 September 2014 – 28 October 2017

Related
- Sesame Street

The Furchester Hotel is a puppet series that aired on CBeebies (the BBC's preschool network). It was the second British-American spin-off of Sesame Street that the BBC had made after Sesame Tree 6 years before. The show ran on CBeebies on 26 September 2014. The show aired in 2016 on Sprout (now Universal Kids) until 2 March 2019.

== Plot ==
The Furchester Hotel is a half-star hotel in a city in England that is owned by a monster family called the Furchester-Fuzz Family. The Furchester-Fuzz Family alongside Elmo and Cookie Monster figure out how to solve different issues that are developed by the guests of the Furchester Hotel.

== Characters ==
=== Main ===
- Funella (performed by Louise Gold) is a monster who is the wife of Furgus, the mother of Phoebe, and the aunt of Elmo. Funella is the main proprietor of the Furchester Hotel, welcoming guests and making sure their stay is wonderful in any way she can. She was designed by Ed Christie.
- Furgus (performed by Andrew Spooner) is a monster who is the husband of Funella, the father of Phoebe, and the uncle of Elmo. He serves as the jack-of-all-trades at the Furchester Hotel and specializes in the hotel's repair needs. Similar to Grover, Furgus takes on several other jobs around the hotel as needed. He was designed by Ed Christie.
- Phoebe (performed by Sarah Burgess) is the protagonist of the series. A 7-year-old violet monster who is the daughter of Furgus and Funella and the cousin of Elmo. Phoebe's main duty at the Furchester Hotel is answering the phone. When she gets a monster idea, her pigtail stands on end and she often says "Fuzzawubba!" In "Animal Talk," it is revealed that Phoebe knows many animal languages. In "Phoebe's Key," it is revealed that the key on Phoebe's necklace can unlock all the doors in the Furchester Hotel as well as the hotel safe. She was designed by Ed Christie.
- Elmo (performed by Ryan Dillon) is the cousin of Phoebe and the nephew of Furgus and Funella. He took an extended stay at the Furchester Hotel due to his fascination with it. Elmo's father Louie is the brother of Funella.
- Cookie Monster (performed by David Rudman) works as the room service worker and a waiter in the Furchester Hotel's dining room. As usual, he eats any cookies that come in his sight. In "Cookie Confusion", it is revealed that Cookie Monster has a British cousin named Biscuit Monster who eats biscuits.
- Note: Abby Cadabby was originally going to be cast as one of the main cast in the series, but was cut off just before the main production due to budget reasons.

=== Recurring ===
- Isabel is a pink furry bell-shaped monster that resembles a call bell. Similar to the Dingers (to whom she is related), Isabel can only communicate through a series of rings. She notifies Funella Furchester whenever an incoming guest is arriving and has a general knowledge of what's happening in the hotel at all times, as well as also cuing the musical breaks during the episodes. Isabel's puppeteers alternate between Sheila Clark and Lesa Gillespie. She was designed by Ed Christie.
- Harvey P. Dull (performed by Mak Wilson in Season 1 and Neil Sterenberg in Season 2) is a Fat Blue Anything Muppet who is a long-term occupant of the Furchester Hotel. In a similar fashion to Mr. Johnson, Harvey P. Dull frequently bears the brunt of the poor service. He cites the one positive thing about the Furchester Hotel is his favorite comfy chair. Harvey claims that the only reason he resides at the Furchester Hotel is a lack of availability in any other nearby hotels. It is currently unknown why he lives in the Furchester hotel.
- Gonger (performed by Mak Wilson in most episodes, David Rudman in some episodes, Colin Purves in "Very Important Porcupine", and Warrick Brownlow-Pike in Season 2) is a small furry pink monster who initially serves as a minor character in the first season. Gonger would bang the large gong at Monster Tea Time, with the large gong occasionally knocking Gonger down or causing him to have a vibration reaction. Sometimes after he bangs the gong, Gonger shouts "Tea Time" to alert the Tea Time Monsters when it's Monster Tea Time. In Season Two, Gonger has a major role and now works as a hotel chef and still bangs the gong for Monster Tea Time from the kitchen. Gonger was later imported to the main show Sesame Street and joined the cast as part of the season 48 segment "Cookie Monster's Foodie Truck".
- The Tea Time Monsters are a quintet of colourful monsters that appear whenever Monster Tea Time occurs (signified by Gonger banging a gong). When Gonger bangs the gong, the Tea Time Monsters emerge from their rooms and plough their way through the Furchester Hotel to get to their tea. During the credits of each episode, the Monsters are shown enjoying Monster Tea Time while chanting "Ugga wugga tea time, ugga wugga clink. Ugga wugga tea time, ugga wugga drink!"
  - Colonel Mustard (alternatively performed by Warrick Brownlow-Pike and Andy Heath) is a yellow monster who is the leader of the Tea Time Monsters.
  - Sorbet (performed by David Rudman and Mak Wilson) is an orange monster who is a member of the Tea Time Monsters. Although the puppet was recycled from the initially named Narf from Sesame Street, after the puppet's other international appearance was for Yoyo on 5, Rue Sésame, the original name was retained as a placeholder for the show's first airings from the year, tagged on Warrick's Facebook profile image, where a new name took effect months later, posted on Twitter from December 10, 2014. The first name, years later as a member of the Tea Time Monsters, on Sesame Street, was coincidentally revealed to Gonger, both being the British residents, where he's played as chef, and Narf, as a customer requesting an overnight oats breakfast for his bicycle ride on the YouTube exclusive Foodie Truck segment, performed by Tyler Bunch.
  - Ethel Bay-Mertz (performed by Lesa Gillespie) is a female purple monster who is a member of the Tea Time Monsters.
  - Berry (performed by Toby Wilson) is a blue monster who is a member of the Tea Time Monsters. He resembles a modified version of Herry Monster.
  - Lulu Lemon (performed by Warrick Brownlow-Pike) is a green female monster who is a member of the Tea Time Monsters.

=== Guests ===
- Big Bird (performed by Matt Vogel) is a special guest at the Furchester Hotel. In "A Big Bird Surprise", Elmo and his friends welcome Big Bird to the Furchester Hotel where he meets everyone. In "A Furchester Christmas", Big Bird and his friends are waiting for Santa where he gives everyone special gifts.
- Count von Count (performed by Matt Vogel) is a special guest at the Furchester Hotel. In "The Count's Vacation", Elmo and his friends meet Count von Count and The Countess to have a break for counting. In "A Furchester Christmas", The Count and his friends are waiting for Santa where he gives everyone special gifts.
- British Two-Headed Monster is a British counterpart of the Two-Headed Monster which sports different facial features and no horns. He makes different background appearances like during the song "A Furchester Never Gives Up" and partaking in the "Monster Monster Day" song where he was seen with Gonger and the Tea Time Monsters.

== Production ==
The series is a British-American co-production. It promotes problem-solving as the monsters try to figure out issues developed by their unique guests. Production of fifty-two 11-minute episodes (for two seasons) began on 24 February 2014 at dock10 studios, MediaCityUK takes about 3 months and ended on 23 May 2014.

On 14 November 2014 Sesame Street's YouTube channel began airing full episodes of The Furchester Hotel each week.

In February 2016, The Furchester Hotel was renewed for series 2 which began production on 16 May 2016 and ended on 19 August 2016. It consists of 50 episodes and a double-length Christmas episode as well as guest appearances by Big Bird, Count von Count, and the Yip Yips. The second series began on 31 October 2016.

On 26 September 2016, Sprout started airing The Furchester Hotel on weekdays. Reruns were aired until 2 March 2019.

On 23 December 2017, The Furchester Hotel began airing in Canada on CBC Kids.

=== Opening sequence ===
The show opens with a different character's face shaped as the river and zooms down into where the bird flies between the buildings and where the hotel is and all the Furchester Family can be seen singing where they are joined in by Elmo and Cookie Monster. The next scene goes to a restaurant, where Furgus, Funella and Cookie Monster are. At the end, all the guests are singing with the Furchester Family, Cookie Monster, and the Tea Time Monsters.

== Episodes ==
Series	Episodes	Originally released	
Series	Episodes	First released	Last released
1	52	26 September 2014	26 March 2016
2	51	31 October 2016	28 October 2017

=== Series 1 (2014–16) ===
No. overall	No. in series	Title	Directed by	Written by	Original release date	YouTube/Netflix release date
1	1	"Welcome to the Furchester"	Jack Jameson	Christine Ferraro	26 September 2014	14 November 2014
Mr. Director and his assistant Carol are visiting the Furchester Hotel to shoot a video to promote the establishment. During the filming, the Furchesters solve some problems along the way like the living arrangements for a penguin named Mrs. Iceburger and a lion named Mr. Mainbury.
2	2	"Don't Eat the Guests"	Jack Jameson	Molly Boylan	27 September 2014	14 November 2014
When the Furchester Hotel runs out of cookies, Cookie Monster is freaking out and a new guest named Mr. Crumb (who is a cookie) arrives. Can the Furchesters stop Cookie Monster from eating Mr. Crumb? Note: This episode premiered as part of the New Shows month on CBeebies.
3	3	"Very Important Porcupine"	Jack Jameson	Christine Ferraro	3 October 2014	2 January 2015
Funella welcomes the incoming guests with furry arms....until one guest named Pierce the Porcupine arrives.
4	4	"Yodel-Ay-Hee-Hoo!"	Jack Jameson	Kathy Waugh	4 October 2014	5 December 2014
When the telephone line breaks at The Furchester Hotel, the Furchesters have no way to communicate. Then, Professor Fleece (a black sheep guest for the yodeling convention) tells them to Yodel it. In the end, the telephones weren't working because the phone was not plugged in as pointed out by Harvey P. Dull.
5	5	"Count Your Chickens"	Jack Jameson	George Poles	10 October 2014	28 November 2014
Phoebe and Elmo need all their creative skills when looking after five excitable chickens while the tour guide dog Griff gets the tour bus out of the garage. Though the chicken Mrs. Featherbottom strays from the group causing Elmo and Phoebe to find her while keeping the chickens together before Griff gets back.
6	6	"The Veggietones"	Jack Jameson	Steve Cannon	11 October 2014	21 November 2014
Funella hires a group of singing vegetables called the Veggietones to make the guests happy, but they cause chaos like waking up Harvey P. Dull, walking in on an alligator named Ms. Gator while she is bathing, and preventing the Tea Time Monsters from having Monster Tea Time. Now the Furchesters need a creative solution to keep them from annoying the guests.
7	7	"Toast with a Smile"	Jack Jameson	Andrew Jones; Ciaran Murtagh	17 October 2014	16 January 2015
While Cookie Monster is outside waiting for a delivery of cookies bound to the dining room, Elmo must deliver a tray of toast to Harvey P. Dull. Along the way, Elmo must dodge the horses, hotel trolleys, bumps in the rug, and the Tea Time Monsters.
8	8	"Isabel Gets the Ding-Ups"	Helen Scott	Howard Read	18 October 2014	12 December 2014
While awaiting a visit from the Dinger who is her cousin, Isabel suffers from the Ding-Ups (a bell-monster's version of a hiccups) and the Furchesters need to stop them so she can welcome all the guests with a friendly ding.
9	9	"Mystery Weekend"	Jack Jameson	Luis Santeiro	24 October 2014	20 February 2015
The Furchester Hotel is holding a special "Mystery Weekend" which is complete with famous detectives. Some of the known detectives include detective duo Ms. Marbles and Penguin Mason (a penguin detective) as well as a raccoon named Inspector Raccoon-seau. Phoebe and Elmo try to answer the question of who is taking everybody's shiny objects.
10	10	"Animal Talk"	Helen Scott	Ian Carney	25 October 2014	14 November 2014
It is a catastrophe when Phoebe loses her voice due to Monster Mumblitis as she is the only Furchester who can talk to the animal guests. Now the other Furchesters must find a way to understand the animal languages until Phoebe gets her voice back.
11	11	"The Furchester Hoot-El"	Helen Scott	Michael Goldberg	31 October 2014	26 December 2014
Elmo and Phoebe are so determined to meet an owl named Mr. Screech that they try to stay awake by balancing, hugging, sitting on uncomfortable chairs, and eating cookies.
12	12	"Furchester TV"	Jack Jameson	Ian Carney	1 November 2014	9 January 2015
Due to the fact that none of the hotel rooms have televisions in them, Phoebe and Elmo create Furchester TV when a duck couple named Mr. and Mrs. Quackmore check in and say they cannot miss their favorite shows.
13	13	"Penguin Bobsleigh Team"	Jack Jameson	Michael Goldberg	7 November 2014	30 January 2015
Phoebe and Elmo help two penguins named the Ice Flippers learn how to bobsleigh during the Birds on Ice Games, but their sled needs mending after a collision on the track with the Tea Time Monsters.
14	14	"The Sculpture"	Jack Jameson	Chris Chantler	8 November 2014	13 March 2015
A cow sculptor named Henry Moo-re (who is a spoof of Henry Moore) is staying at the Furchester and has created a sculpture that is an abstract likeness of Funella as she wishes to keep it in the lobby for all to see. Henry Mo-re does not want anyone to touch the statue since it is fragile. Keeping the sculpture of Funella safe proves to be a difficult task when Cookie Monster, a giant squid named Mrs. Inkwell, and the Tea Time Monsters are in the hotel.
15	15	"Caterpillar Catastrophe"	Helen Scott	Andrew Jones; Ciaran Murtagh	14 November 2014	27 March 2015
The Furchester family members must think like a caterpillar while searching the hotel when they think they have lost a guest named Mr. Squigglebottom at the time when another caterpillar named Ms. Scuttles comes to visit him.
16	16	"Furchester on Wheels"	Helen Scott	Davey Moore	15 November 2014	6 February 2015
Funella overhears husband and wife tortoise guests Sheldon and Shelly say that the hotel service is slow, so she becomes determined to make it fast with the plan involving everyone wearing roller skates.
17	17	"Monster Monster Day"	Jack Jameson	Molly Boylan	19 December 2014	19 December 2014
On Monster Monster Day (a holiday that is part of the Christmas season), the Furchester Family decorate the Furchester Hotel as part of the season as Elmo looks forward to Monster Monster visiting as the story of Monster Monster states that he pays a visit to one hotel. When it appears that Monster Monster is a no show, Harvey P. Dull gets into the Monster Monster Day spirit by dressing up as Monster Monster to make Elmo happy until the real Monster Monster shows up.
18	18	"Peckity Woodpecker"	Helen Scott	Kathy Waugh	3 January 2015	3 April 2015
A woodpecker named Elwood checks into the hotel and is put into the Oak Room (a popular room for bird guests) where he ends up pecking holes causing the Furchesters to find other things for Elwood to peck. At the same time, the Furchesters are looking forward for their musical guests the Ding-a-Lings consisting of glockenspiel player Mr. Ding and violinist Ms. Ling where Mr. Ding's glockenspiel has arrived while Mr. Ding has not yet arrived. Both situations are solved with Elwood pecking the glockenspiel.
19	19	"Super Rock"	Jack Jameson	Simon Davies	9 January 2015	24 April 2015
On a windy day, the rock superhero Super Rock arrives to help out the Furchester Hotel. Elmo becomes his assistant to help him out with various situations. When Super Rock's cape is accidentally ripped by the Monsters and loses his abilities, Elmo and Phoebe must find a way to have Super Rock be super again.
20	20	"Mr. Huggles Hibernates"	Helen Scott	Stuart Kenworthy	10 January 2015	27 February 2015
A bear named Mr. Huggles falls asleep in the lobby at the Furchester during his hibernation season. With no-one able to wake him, the staff struggle to find a way to get him upstairs to the Hibernation Suite.
21	21	"Ballroom Dance Weekend"	Jack Jameson	Luis Santeiro	16 January 2015	6 March 2015
It is ballroom dance weekend, but the floor is so shiny that the dancers slip over. The Furchesters needs to find a way to keep the dancers' feet on the floor.
22	22	"Bebe Comes to Stay"	Helen Scott	Ian Carney	17 January 2015	13 February 2015
Cousin Bebe comes to stay, but Phoebe is jealous when she seems better at talking to the animals, helping out in the dining room, and stopping the Tea Time Monsters from running over the guests. Phoebe eventually comes to Bebe and Elmo's aid when Mr. Wolf is placed in the chicken suite by mistake since Bebe doesn't speak wolf language.
23	23	"Furgus and the New Plant"	Helen Scott	Ian Carney	23 January 2015	20 March 2015
The monsters must find the perfect spot for a fussy potted plant named Mr. Evergroan who complains about everything including the noise, the smell of cookies, the curtains, and the elevator.
24	24	"Phoebe's Key"	Jack Jameson	Andrew Jones; Ciaran Murtagh	24 January 2015	23 January 2015
While Funella and Furgus are away at Monster Bowling Night, Elmo learns that Phoebe's necklace contains a special key on it which opens every door in the Furchester Hotel. When Phoebe loses it following a mix-up caused by the Monsters knocking off Mrs. Jangles' jewelry, Elmo must help Phoebe find it so that she can get Harvey P. Dull back into his hotel room before his bathtub overflows, get Mrs. Jangles' bracelet out of the safe following her swim in the hotel's swimming pool, and open Cookie Monster's "Just in Case Cookie Cabinet" to get to the cookie inside.
25	25	"Mr. Lawnmower"	Helen Scott	Ian Carney	30 January 2015	10 April 2015
A goat named Mr. Lawnmower checks into the Furchester Hotel and starts eating stuff that isn't food starting with the furniture. Meanwhile, Furgus tries to get rid of a vine that keeps growing following his trimming of Mrs. Fernbottom.
26	26	"Pony in Disguise"	Helen Scott	Katherine Jakeways	31 January 2015	17 April 2015
When a tired pony named Mr. Carrot comes to the Furchester Hotel to take a rest when all the guests want to take a ride, the Furchester family works to come up with ways so that Mr. Carrot's rest can't be disturbed.
27	27	"Skunks Welcome"	Helen Scott	Belinda Ward	4 May 2015	1 February 2017
The guests of the Furchester Hotel smell Mr. Smells-a-Lot the Skunk and want to check out. So Phoebe and Elmo have to stop the friendly skunk from spraying when he's surprised.
28	28	"Lift It, Shake It, Find It"	Helen Scott	Kathy Waugh	5 May 2015	1 February 2017
A cow named Mrs. Moodle loses a precious hair curler. The Furchesters bring in two mice to search the hotel.
29	29	"Mooga Monster Tale"	Jack Jameson	Steve Cannon	6 May 2015	1 February 2017
Ms. Taylor Penworth, the writer of the Mooga Monster books, checks in. She needs the Furchester and many noisy monsters help to write her new story.
30	30	"Noisy Night"	Jack Jameson	Kathy Waugh	7 May 2015	1 February 2017
Two howling wolves keep all the guests awake. The Furchesters need to find a way to send them to sleep.
31	31	"Ant Checks In"	Helen Scott	Belinda Ward	8 May 2015	1 February 2017
The Furchester Hotel can be a big and noisy place if you are a tiny, quiet ant like Mr. Albert Antoine. So Phoebe and Elmo need to find him the perfect room.
32	32	"The Woolly Sisters"	Jack Jameson	George Poles	11 May 2015	1 February 2017
Furgus and Funella think there is one Ms. Woolly but there are more....they're identical sisters!
33	33	"Repetitive Welcoming Injury"	Helen Scott	Howard Reid and Chris Chantier	12 May 2015	1 February 2017
It's a catastrophe when Funella's arms are stuck open wide and she can't welcome the guests. As Dr. Repeat diagnoses her condition as "Repetitive Welcoming Injury," the Furchesters need Funella to rest for a whole day while they work hard to welcome the guests in her place.
34	34	"Sit Still Elmo"	Jack Jameson	Emma Millions	13 May 2015	1 February 2017
Elmo is having his portrait painted by monster artist Mr. Fuzzlebrush, but he just can't stop moving and needs the Furchesters to help him sit still.
35	35	"Stubborn as a Donkey"	Helen Scott	Belinda Ward	14 May 2015	1 February 2017
When the automated luggage trolley breaks, Furgus replaces it with Trolley the Donkey. But she refuses to move and help the guests which causes some problems.
36	36	"Problem Parrot"	Jack Jameson	John Camm and Will Maclean	15 May 2015	1 February 2017
Ms. Twitcher's parrot Monty copies every woof, meow, and monster noise! The Furchesters try to calm the chaos caused by this.
37	37	"Dinosaur in Room 223"	Jack Jameson	Steve Cannon	18 May 2015	1 February 2017
An Apatosaurus named Mr. Dinofeller surprises Elmo, then seems to disappear. The Furchesters go on a dino hunt to find their oldest biggest guest.
38	38	"Wake Up Call"	Jack Jameson	George Poles	19 May 2015	1 February 2017
Funella has to remember to crow like Beaky the Rooster when Harvey P. Dull needs to wake up at 12:00 PM at the time when Beaky the Rooster is on his day off.
39	39	"The Blooming"	Helen Scott	Tony Reed	20 May 2015	1 February 2017
Guests arrive to see Miss Flora the most beautiful flower. The Furchesters need to help this flower to bloom.
40	40	"Ripe N' Shine"	Jack Jameson	Davey Moore	21 May 2015	1 February 2017
Funella wants to make her first fruit guests Mr. Orange, Miss Grapes, and Mr. Pineapple happy in the Furchester Hotel's new Fruit-Ripening Lounge.
41	41	"Walking the Dog"	Helen Scott	Simon Davies	22 May 2015	1 February 2017
Furgus opens a dog-walking service at the Furchester Hotel. Unfortunately, Mr. Waggington's dog Otto would rather play chase than be walked.
42	42	"The Lost Jacket"	Helen Scott	Alexandra Owen	12 October 2015	1 February 2017
Phoebe and Elmo help Jackie the Jacket find her owner Miss Pinkly while Furgus and Miss Pinkly look for Jackie!
43	43	"Monster Glue"	Helen Scott	Katherine Jakeways	13 October 2015	1 February 2017
The Furchesters accidentally get stuck together upon being exposed to a traveling saleswoman's Monster Glue and need to find Monster Unstick to keep the hotel running.
44	44	"Nobody Has a Hat Like That"	Helen Scott	Steve Cannon	14 October 2015	1 February 2017
Phoebe helps Elmo find a special hat. Meanwhile, Furgus and Funella search for Miss Tuftly's missing headwear.
45	45	"Hotel Helper"	Helen Scott	Steve Cannon	15 October 2015	1 February 2017
Funella hires an enthusiastic Bobby Bunny to help Furgus with his work, but Bobby starts to take over the hotel!
46	46	"Mr. Dull's Chair Repair"	Jack Jameson	Stuart Kenworthy	16 October 2015	1 February 2017
When Harvey P. Dull's chair breaks, the Furchesters have to keep him entertained while it's being repaired by a specialist.
47	47	"Buried Treasure"	Helen Scott	Michael Goldberg	19 October 2015	1 February 2017
A pirate named Captain Metimbers takes Phoebe and Elmo on a treasure hunt. They follow clues written on hidden scrolls.
48	48	"Eggsitting"	Helen Scott	Andrew Jones and Ciaran Murtagh	20 October 2015	1 February 2017
The Furchesters have to keep an egg safe in the lobby for Mr. and Mrs. Birdie when the ceiling starts to fall down.
49	49	"Phoebe's Monster Doll"	Helen Scott	Emma Millions	21 October 2015	1 February 2017
Elmo accidentally gives Phoebe's favourite monster doll Bumpfy to a guest. They decide to get it back, but the guest is a sleeping tiger named Mr. Clawford.
50	50	"Lobby Race"	Helen Scott	Andrew Jones and Ciaran Murtagh	22 October 2015	1 February 2017
Elmo faces up to Charlton the Champion in the lobby obstacle race. Phoebe shows him how to run the course. They go through the different challenges like the "Tower of Towels," the "Pillow Pluck," and the "Short Order Scramble."
51	51	"Hotel Inspector"	Jack Jameson	Christine Ferraro	23 October 2015	1 February 2017
The Furchesters have to solve a lot of problems on the day a hotel inspector visits. Can they distract him from the chaos?
52	52	"The Lamb Stampers"	Jack Jameson	Michael Goldberg	26 March 2016	1 February 2017
When two of the three dancing sheep called the Lamb Stampers are unwell, Phoebe and Elmo step in to learn the steps!

=== Series 2 (2016–17) ===
No. overall	No. in series	Title	Directed by	Written by	Original release date
53	1	"A Big Bird Surprise"	Richard Bradley	Christine Ferraro	31 October 2016
Big Bird shows up at the Furchester Hotel to visit Elmo after Phoebe and Cookie Monster arrange for him to arrive. As Harvey P. Dull's feather allergies act up, the Furchesters work to find a suitable place for Big Bird to bunk in as most of the known areas are too small for him.
54	2	"The Hotel Robot"	Simon Gibney	Molly Boylan	1 November 2016
The Furchesters afford a helper robot called Dot Bot. When it malfunctions, the Furchesters must catch Dot Bot before it causes havoc enough to bother the guests. Note: Dot Bot is a recycled version of the robot used for Rico in some episodes of Sesame Street and Memorybot in The Best of Elmo 2.
55	3	"Gonger's Gong's Gone"	Simon Gibney	Steve Cannon	2 November 2016
When two penguin guests named Mr. and Mrs. Twotone borrow Gonger's gong to use as a sledge, the Furchesters must find another gong so that Gonger can alert the Tea Time Monsters when it is Monster Tea Time.
56	4	"Chick Swagger"	Simon Gibney	Barry Quinn	3 November 2016
A world famous rock and roll rooster named Chick Swagger (who is a spoof of Mick Jagger) is coming to the Furchester Hotel to perform his new song "The Tail Feather Shake." When Chick Swagger is running late, the Furchesters must work to keep his chicken fans distracted while they await his arrival. Note: This is an episode adaptation of The Furchester Hotel Live show from the CBeebies Land theme park at Alton Towers Resort in the Spring of 2017.
57	5	"Bunk Bed Blues"	Richard Bradley	Kathy Waugh	4 November 2016
Phoebe has become annoyed that Elmo won't take a turn sleeping in the top bunk of their bunk bed. In order to figure out why Phoebe is acting this way, Elmo turns to Funella, Furgus, and Cookie Monster for help.
58	6	"The Furgulator"	Simon Gibney	Ian Carney	7 November 2016
When the Furchesters have been busy handling the guests and get exhausted, Furgus invents the Furgulator which is an automated moving tracks that anyone to anywhere in the Furchester Hotel.
59	7	"Cheer Up Cheerleaders"	Richard Bradley	Tony Reed	8 November 2016
A trio of cheery cheerleaders arrive at the Furchester Hotel where their cheering prevents Mr. and Mrs. Flapalot into getting into their rooms, Gonger from banging his gong, the Tea Time Monsters from getting to their tea, and even caused Cookie Monster to drop his cookie. Funella and Furgus work to keep the cheerleaders in line. As a former cheerleading champion, Harvey P. Dull trains Elmo and Phoebe into being cheerleaders at the time of the cheerleaders' antics.
60	8	"Cookie Confusion"	Simon Gibney and Tom Cousins	Andrew Jones and Ciaran Murtagh	9 November 2016
Cookies mysteriously start to disappear around the hotel and framed Cookie Monster. It is up to the Furchesters to find who is eating them all. Isabel was the only witness to the action where she mistakes Cookie Monster's British cousin Biscuit Monster as Cookie Monster. Note: The Cowabunga Cookie Shark from episode 4632 is among the guests that the Furchesters match Isabel's description of.
61	9	"A Very Dull Birthday"	Simon Gibney	Julia Kent	10 November 2016
It's Harvey P. Dull's birthday as the Furchester's plan a surprise birthday for him. As Harvey never had a birthday party before, the Furchesters work to give him one with comical results.
62	10	"The Veggietones and the Lost Voice"	Simon Gibney	Steve Cannon	11 November 2016
The Veggietones return for another performance at the Furchester Hotel. Unfortunately, the carrot member has lost her voice during the performance. The Furchesters work to find someone to cover for the carrot.
63	11	"Space Alien Party"	Simon Gibney	Luis Santeiro	14 November 2016
The Furchester Family hold a Space Alien Party. When Elmo and Phoebe wish for some aliens to attend, two Yip Yips appear upon landing in the Furchester Hotel's garden where they mistake the guests as actual aliens.
64	12	"A Very Precious Cat"	Simon Gibney	Ian Carney	15 November 2016
A cat named Precious checks into the Furchester Hotel and soon has the Furchester family doing absolutely everything for her. Unfortunately, this means they can't look after all the other guests. The Furchester family need to find a way to keep all their guests and Precious happy.
65	13	"The Count's Vacation"	Richard Bradley	Mark Saltzman	16 November 2016
Count von Count and the Countess arrive at the Furchester, but Countess wants her husband to have a break from counting which is hard for Count von Count to do.
66	14	"Power Cut"	Simon Gibney	Ciaran Murtagh and Andrew Jones	17 November 2016
The Furchester has a very special pop star named Miss Baa-Baa singing at the hotel. When the power goes out during the show, no-one can see anything and the Furchesters have to think of ways to get the lights working so that the show can go on. At the same time, Funella checks in a family of fireflies called the Glowmings. Note: Miss Baa-Baa is a recycled version of Ovejita from Sesame Street. The Glowmings are a recycled version of the Pesties from The Adventures of Elmo in Grouchland.
67	15	"No Guests"	Richard Bradley	Rob Jenkinson	18 November 2016
The Tea Time Monsters leave the Furchester Hotel to go to a tea party at another hotel and that there won't be any guests for the next few days. For the first time ever, the Furchester Hotel has no guests which makes Funella very sad indeed. Phoebe, Elmo and Furgus need to find a way to make Funella happy again.
68	16	"A Furchester Christmas"	Richard Bradley	Belinda Ward	15 December 2016
It's Christmas Eve at the Furchester Hotel as Big Bird and Count von Count work to help the Furchester family get through the holiday even when they were unable to tell Santa Claus that they are away from Sesame Street. Note: This episode is a special double-length one.
69	17	"Harvey Gets a Song Stuck"	Julian Kemp	Howard Read and Chris Chantler	6 February 2017
Funella is writing a song to welcome the hotel guests. It is so catchy that it gets stuck in Harvey P. Dull's head and gets on his nerves. Now the Furchesters must find a way to get the song out of his head.
70	18	"Furcut Day"	Simon Gibney	Isabel Fay	7 February 2017
Elmo gets to push the luggage trolley all by himself. But his fur is so long that it covers his eyes and he can't see. Elmo needs a furcut. A visiting expert barber named Vidal Raccoon starts giving people haircuts as Elmo avoids him since the haircuts he gave everyone makes them look different to Elmo.
71	19	"The Knights of the Furchester"	Julian Kemp	Ian Carney	8 February 2017
A Knight of the Triangular Table named Sir Gary checks into the Furchester Hotel because he's heard there are many problems there and wants to help. What he doesn't know is that most of the problems are minor ones.
72	20	"The Magician's Assistant"	Richard Bradley	Andy Potter and Tony Reed	9 February 2017
The Furchesters meet an avian magician named the Great Featherini. But Featherini's assistant Arthur wants to be a great magician too.
73	21	"The Furchester Talent Show"	Simon Gibney	Ron Holsey	10 February 2017
All the hotel guests and the Furchester family take part in the Furchester Talent Show except for Harvey P. Dull who claims he doesn't have any talents.
74	22	"Furchester Family Dinner"	Richard Bradley	Michael J. Goldberg	13 February 2017
It's time for the Furchester family dinner. When Harvey P. Dull states that there won't be anyone to watch the front desk if they are having dinner, Funella teaches him how to run the front desk as a way to cover for the Furchester family.
75	23	"The Night Manager"	Julian Kemp	Steve Cannon	14 February 2017
Funella works as the night manager for the first time ever when the usual night manager has stubbed his big toe and can't come to work. She is so eager to help the guests that she keeps waking them all up. Meanwhile, Elmo and Phoebe meet some of the nocturnal guests at the hotel.
76	24	"Ups and Downs"	Simon Gibney	Andrew Emerson	15 February 2017
Two very excitable rabbits named Mr. and Mrs. Warren check into the hotel. The rabbits love to hop up and down, so they want to stay in the lift instead of a room. At the same time, the Furchester family is holding a rooftop concert where John Lemmon is performing. Note: John Lemmon is a recycled version of the lemon used for Liz Lemon in the parody 30 Rocks in Episode 4168 of Sesame Street.
77	25	"The Lucky Horseshoe"	Richard Bradley	George Poles	16 February 2017
At the Furchester Horse Jumping Tournament, Phoebe and Elmo meet a horse named Gidyup who can do amazing jumps because he has a lucky horseshoe. When a scuffle with the Tea Time Monsters sends the horseshoe into the rift, Gidyup can't perform without it. Now the Furchester Family must find a substitute item for Gidyup before the Furchester Horse Jumping Tournament begins.
78	26	"Olivia the Octopus"	Julian Kemp	Adam Redfern	17 February 2017
A very friendly octopus named Olivia checks into the Furchester Hotel, but cannot help knocking things and people over with her arms.
79	27	"Furball"	Simon Gibney	Belinda Ward and Stuart Kenworthy	20 February 2017
The Furball, a bouncing furry monster ball, arrives at the hotel. Everyone looks forward to a game of Furball until the Furball goes missing.
80	28	"The Babysitting Service"	Richard Bradley	Michael J. Goldberg	21 February 2017
The Furchester family is looking after a baby monster called Adrianna and everyone has a suggestion for how to get her to fall asleep. Note: Adrianna is a recycled version of Lena from Sesamstrasse.
81	29	"The Very Snowy Suite"	Simon Gibney	Gabe Pulliam	22 February 2017
A family of snowballs come to stay in the Very Snowy Suite. Unfortunately, the Very Snowy Suite is not very snowy at all and the Snowballs start to melt.
82	30	"Changing Rooms"	Julian Kemp	Phillip Davies	23 February 2017
Funella decides Harvey P. Dull's room is too dull and needs a makeover. How can Harvey tell her that he likes his room just the way it is?
83	31	"The Furchester Cooking Competition"	Simon Gibney	Michael J. Goldberg	24 February 2017
Phoebe enters the Furchester Cooking Competition, but can't concentrate because Gonger and Cookie Monster are too noisy.
84	32	"Give a Dog a Bone"	Richard Bradley	Isabel Fay	3 April 2017
One of the hotel's dog guests named Digby loves his toy bone. It's blue, squeaky and smells of cheese. But Digby can't find the bone anywhere.
85	33	"Great Grandmama"	Julian Kemp	Julia Kent	4 April 2017
Funella's Grandmama, who founded the Furchester Hotel, comes to visit and is unhappy that it's not as monstery as it used to be in her day. Her ways to make the Furchester Hotel monstery again frightens the guests enough for them to check out.
86	34	"Monkey Business"	Simon Gibney	Howard Reed & Chris Chantler	5 April 2017
A monkey named Mr. Ook Eek checks into the hotel, so the Furchesters hang vines around the hotel and put bananas on the menu to make him feel at home. Though he isn't comfortable with the same monkey routine.
87	35	"Monster Pox"	Julian Kemp	Ciarian Murtagh and Andrew Jones	6 April 2017
After Funella checks in Mr. Cuddles, the Furchester family and Cookie Monster catch Monster Pox, a funny illness only monsters get. Harvey P. Dull has to look after them and run the hotel by himself. As the outbreak occurs, Furgus works to find the cure for Monster Pox in order to cure every infected monster. Note: Mr. Cuddles is a recycled version of Azibo the Monster from Panwapa.
88	36	"The Furchester Fashion Show"	Richard Bradley	Rob Jenkinson	7 April 2017
The Furchester Fashion Show is occurring as Elmo and Phoebe check on the clothes that will be presented on the catwalk. When two dirty socks won't get cleaned, Elmo and Phoebe must persuade them into considering how getting clean is fun.
89	37	"The 1,000th Guest"	Julian Kemp	Andy Potter	10 April 2017
The Furchesters have 1,000 cookies ready for the 1,000th guest to claim as a present. The guest arrives....except it's Harvey P Dull. Cookie Monster then has an idea and disappears. A moment later, a very suspicious-looking guest arrives....it's Cookie Monster dressed up! As the Furchesters try to stop Cookie Monster eating the cookies, the real 1,000th guest arrives only there are two of them....a chicken and an egg. Which came first? Note: This episode aired alongside Julia's debut episode of Sesame Street.
90	38	"Carla Chameleon"	Julian Kemp	Christine Ferraro	11 April 2017
Isabel dings to say a guest is ready to check in, but the Furchesters can't see anyone there. That is until Carla the Chameleon un-camouflages herself. Carla is very quiet and sometimes she can't help but camouflage herself so that people can't see her. Phoebe and Elmo take her up to the Camouflage Suite and Carla is soon blending into her surroundings. But when Furgus comes to bring Carla her towels, he can't see her or hear her and thinks that no-one is in the room. It's a bit of a problem.
91	39	"The Faboulous Feathers"	Julian Kemp	Tony Reed and Rob Jenkinson	12 April 2017
Mr. Flash, a fabulous peacock with even more fabulous feathers, enters the hotel with total pizzazz. Everyone is in awe of Mr. Flash's feathers. But when Funella goes to welcome him with furry arms, Mr. Flash tells her that he doesn't want his feathers ruffled. Everyone can look, but not touch. Phoebe and Elmo are about to take him up to his room, the Glam Suite when Funella announces that the Furchester Garden Games are about to start. Mr. Flash decides that he'd like to play too. Note: Mr. Flash is a recycled version of Ming from Episode 4057 of Sesame Street.
92	40	"Gonger Goes"	Julian Kemp	Kathy Waughn	13 April 2017
Gonger makes breakfast for everyone, but the fussy Furchesters aren't happy. Later on, the Furchesters are having a BBQ with their guests. Everyone is really enjoying their food, but Funella thanks Furgus rather than Gonger. Back inside, Harvey P. Dull is unhappy there is a crumb on his tray of tea and biscuits. Gonger is fed up and announces he is leaving the hotel.
93	41	"The Leaky Room"	Julian Kemp	George Poles	14 April 2017
Funella welcomes a group of fish called the Swimalots to the Furchester Hotel. When Funella gets their aquarium to take them to the aquarium suite, Furgus accidentally drops it causing some water to drip down into Harvey P. Dull's room where the flooding causes him problems.
94	42	"The Fairy Tale Festival"	Richard Bradley	Ciaran Murtagh and Andrew Jones	24 July 2017
The Furchester family is dressed in fairy tale costumes because it's the Furchester Fairytale Festival! Immediately loads of fairy tale characters start to arrive. First are the Three Little Pigs, then Goldilocks, and then Little Boy Blue. Elmo can't believe that all his fairy tale heroes are there and there's going to be a grand ball that night! Just then, the Big Bad Wolf arrives at the hotel and all the fairy tale characters get very worried, as he's already huffing and puffing!
95	43	"The Munching Moths"	Julian Kemp	Ron Holsey	25 July 2017
The front desk at the Furchester is covered in wool. Funella announces that she is going to knit everyone a jumper! Just then Furgus arrives with a new Moth guest named Mr. Munch and his baby moth larvae. Straight away, the larvae start to eat at the wool on the desk. Mr. Munch tells his babies to stop eating the wool and that it is not theirs. A bit later on, another guest comes down into the lobby from the lift and says that her blanket is full of holes. Harvey P. Dull says that his jacket is full of holes too and so is Furgus's neck tie! Phoebe says that something odd is going on and goes to try and find out what is causing the holes.
96	44	"The Wedding Cake Caper"	Julian Kemp	Steve Cannon	26 July 2017
Wedding bells are ringing at the Furchester Hotel. In the garden, the wedding between an Owl and a Cat has taken place and now it's cake time! Furgus and Phoebe go to get the cake. In the meantime, Funella decides to sing a special song that she's written for the occasion. Furgus and Phoebe walk through to the dining room where there is a huge cake waiting for them, but that's not all. Gonger shouts that there's another piece to go on top. It's the biggest, most beautiful cake ever. However, it's so big that they have problems getting it through to the garden! Note: The Owl Groom is a recycled version of Hoots the Owl from Sesame Street.
97	45	"Saved by a Bell"	Julian Kemp	Tony Reed	27 July 2017
Elmo is practicing riding his bike in the hotel garden. Unfortunately, Harvey P. Dull walks in front of him and Elmo bumps into him. Harvey asks Elmo why he didn't ring his bell and Elmo admits that he doesn't have a bell. Meanwhile, Furgus is very excited. He's managed to buy the very latest in hotel bell technology, the Ding Dong 7.1. Isabel is not happy as she is the hotel bell. After the bell is delivered, Funella wants to know what it's going to be used for. So Furgus looks for somewhere for it to go.
98	46	"The Woof Woof Games"	Richard Bradley	Molly Boylan	28 July 2017
The Furchesters are getting ready for the Woof Woof Games, where three special dogs have to take on three dog challenges. As they are getting ready, Jasper, the winner from last year, arrives with his excitable son Sparky. Jasper and the other dogs line up to start the games, but when the announcer shouts 'go', a sleeping cat wakes up and darts into Jasper and he hurts his paw. Jasper has to go to the Doggy Hospital, but as he leaves he says that he wants Sparky to take his place. It is down to Phoebe and Elmo to teach Sparky how to stay focused and remember what he is supposed to do for each event, but it is not so easy because Sparky is just so excitable.
99	47	"The Fish in the Cape"	Julian Kemp	Ian Carney	31 July 2017
Mr. Vincent, a very kind guest, arrives at the Furchester Hotel. He's a fish who wears a very big cape, but soon the cape starts to cause problems like knocking things over and getting stuck in the doors. But Mr. Vincent seems scared to take it off. Soon it becomes apparent why he wears the cape. Mr. Vincent is a shark! Note: Mr. Vincent is a recycled version of The Cowabunga Cookie Shark from Episode 4632 of Sesame Street and Episode 60: Cookie Confusion.
100	48	"Hide and Seek"	Richard Bradley	Howard Reed and Chris Chantler	1 August 2017
Elmo is practicing for the world hide-and-seek championships, to be held at the hotel. Just then Seeky Suki, the world's best seeker, arrives at the hotel and starts to demonstrate how good she is at finding people. Elmo becomes sad because he really wants to win, but doesn't think he will. But Furgus tells him that when they put their furry heads together they can solve any problem.
101	49	"Claudia the Crab"	Julian Kemp	Gabe Pulliam	2 August 2017
Claudia the Crab visits the Furchester Hotel, but when Funella goes to welcome her with furry arms, Claudia accidentally pinches her. Then Elmo goes to give her her key and she accidentally pinches him too. Phoebe has an idea and gets Funella to knit some mittens for Claudia, but then Claudia can't pick up her food. There has to be something else they can do to stop Claudia pinching.
102	50	"Music Mayhem"	Julian Kemp	Andrew Emerson	3 August 2017
Funella has a very exciting idea for the hotel, Musical Monster Mealtimes! She has booked some instruments to play music in the dining room whilst the guests eat. They are Vi & Beau, a violin and bow, and Clara, a jazzy clarinet. Elmo and Phoebe really want to play for the diners too, but Funella tells them they have to practice first. Unfortunately the instruments aren't used to playing with each other and play completely different tunes. It sounds awful. Elmo and Phoebe have to show them how to play nicely together. Note: Vi and Beau is a recycled version of a Violin and a Bow from Elmo's World from Episode 4151 of Sesame Street and a Fiddle from Kids' Favorite Country Songs. Also, Clara is a recycled version of a Clarinet from Elmo's World.
103	51	"A Pumpkin's Halloween"	Richard Bradley	Christine Ferraro	28 October 2017
It's Halloween at the Furchester Hotel and the hotel pumpkin is in his rightful place on the front desk, ready to great all the trick or treaters with his cheery 'Happy Halloween!' Elmo and Phoebe are going trick or treating around the hotel dressed as a two-headed monster. Elmo is excited because he has never been trick or treating in a hotel before. He asks if the pumpkin has but the pumpkin says he's never been trick or treating anywhere before. Phoebe has an idea: the pumpkin should go trick or treating with them. But someone will have to take over the pumpkin's role at the front desk.

== Broadcast ==
In the US, the show is on YouTube, Sesame Street Go, iTunes, as of 26 September 2016, on Sprout, and as of 2017, several Furchester Hotel seasons 1 and 2 episodes were released part of Elmo’s World home video releases. In Australia, the show was airing on 13 April 2015 at 7:30 am on ABC Kids. In South Africa, Poland and Australia, the show was airing on CBeebies. In the USA, UK, Canada, Spain, France, Belgium, the Netherlands, Hong Kong and Singapore, the show is on Netflix. In Canada, the show is on Knowledge Kids, TVOKids and CBC Kids. In Ireland, the show was dubbed into Irish language called "Óstán Furchester" on Cúla 4 on 6 June 2018. In Mexico, the show premiered on Azteca 7 on 20 June 2022 as "Plaza Sésamo: El Hotel Furchester". In the United Arab Emirates, the show aired on e-Junior. In Asia, the show aired on Disney Junior Southeast Asia.
