= Children's and Family Emmy Award for Outstanding Puppeteer Performer =

Award for puppetry in a television series

- Awarded for: Outstanding Puppeteer Performance
- Country: United States
- Presented by: Academy of Television Arts & Sciences
- First award: 2023
- Currently held by: Leslie Carrara-Rudolph, Sesame Street, 2024
- Website: theemmys.tv/childrens/

The Children's and Family Emmy Award for Outstanding Puppeteer Performer honors performances in both television series and made-for-television/streaming films. The category was established at the 2nd Children's and Family Emmy Awards in 2023, and is open to performers of all genders. It is one of two categories to honor puppetry, alongside the Children's and Family Emmy Award for Outstanding Puppet Design/Styling.

The inaugural recipient of the award was Ryan Dillon for his work as the puppeteer of Elmo in Sesame Street, which airs on HBO Max. The current holder of the award is Leslie Carrara-Rudolph for her work as Abby Cadabby and Tango in Sesame Street.

== Background ==
On November 17, 2021, the NATAS announced the creation of the Children's and Family Emmy Awards to recognize the best in children's and family television. The organization cited an "explosive growth in the quantity and quality of children’s and family programming" as justification for a dedicated ceremony. Many categories of the awards were previously presented at the Daytime Emmy Awards. Performers (including puppeteers) in programming aimed towards children and young people were previously honored with the Daytime Emmy Award for Outstanding Performer in Children's Programming, which was presented under various names however, following the announcement of the establishment of the Children's and Family Emmy Awards, these categories were discontinued.

The category was announced on July 24, 2023. In a statement, National Academy of Television Arts and Sciences CEO Adam Sharp explained that “historically, puppetry performers would enter in the live action performer categories, so, if you were the handler of a puppet, then you would go up against a lead actor or lead actress, and that created for some odd pairings. But managing a puppet is a very different kind of performance than a regular live action performance,” and noted that the creation of a specific category designed to award these performers would allow them to receive the overdue recognition they deserve. Beginning with the 3rd Children's and Family Emmy Awards in 2024, performers are encouraged to submit an additional "behind the scenes" video alongside their regular submission which “highlights the human with the puppet(s), demonstrating how the puppet comes alive”.

The original name for the category was Outstanding Puppeteer Performance, and the award received its current name as of the 3rd Children's and Family Emmy Awards.

== Winners and nominations ==
=== 2020s ===
| Year | Actor | Role | Program | Network | Refs |
|---|---|---|---|---|---|
2023 (2nd)
| 2023 (2nd) | Ryan Dillon | Elmo | Sesame Street | HBO Max | |
| 2023 (2nd) | Leslie Carrara-Rudolph | Abby Cadabby & Tango | Sesame Street | HBO Max | |
| 2023 (2nd) | Frankie Cordero | Purple Panda, Penguin Referee & Gregory | Donkey Hodie | PBS Kids | |
| 2023 (2nd) | Harley Jenkins | Donkey Hodie | Donkey Hodie | PBS Kids | |
| 2023 (2nd) | Eric Jacobson | Bert, Oscar the Grouch & Grover | Sesame Street | HBO Max | |
| 2023 (2nd) | Eric Jacobson | Animal | The Muppets Mayhem | Disney+ | |
2024 (3rd)
| 2024 (3rd) | Leslie Carrara-Rudolph | Abby Cadabby & Tango | Sesame Street | HBO Max | |
| 2024 (3rd) | Eric Jacobson | Bert, Oscar the Grouch & Grover | Sesame Street | HBO Max | |
| 2024 (3rd) | Donna Kimball | Mokey, Storyteller & Cotterpin | Fraggle Rock: Back to the Rock | Apple TV+ | |
| 2024 (3rd) | Karen Prell | Red & Icy Joe | Fraggle Rock: Back to the Rock | Apple TV+ | |
| 2024 (3rd) | David Rudman | Cookie Monster | Sesame Street | HBO Max | |
2025 (4th)
| 2025 (4th) | Leslie Carrara-Rudolph | Abby Cadabby & Tango | Sesame Street | HBO Max | |
| 2025 (4th) | Frankie Cordero | Purple Panda, Turtle-Lou & Penguin Referee | Donkey Hodie | PBS Kids | |
| 2025 (4th) | Stephanie D'Abruzzo | Duck Duck, Harriet Elizabeth Cow, Mama Panda & Doc Skunk | Donkey Hodie | PBS Kids | |
| 2025 (4th) | Ryan Dillon | Elmo & Felix | Sesame Street | HBO Max | |
| 2025 (4th) | Carmen Osbahr | Rosita | Sesame Street | HBO Max | |

== Puppeteers with multiple wins ==
2 wins

- Leslie Carrara-Rudolph

== Puppeteers with multiple nominations ==
3 nominations

- Eric Jacobson
- Leslie Carrara-Rudolph

2 nominations

- Frankie Cordero
- Ryan Dillon

== Programs with multiple nominations ==
9 nominations

- Sesame Street

4 nominations

- Donkey Hodie

2 nominations

- Fraggle Rock: Back to the Rock

== Networks with multiple nominations ==
6 nominations

- HBO Max

4 nominations

- PBS Kids
