= Mecha Builders =

Animated children's television series

- Also known as: Sesame Street: Mecha Builders
- Genre: Superhero
- Based on: Sesame Street by Joan Ganz Cooney; Lloyd Morrisett Muppet characters by Jim Henson
- Developed by: Joe Fallon
- Directed by: Yurie Rocha
- Voices of: Leslie Carrara-Rudolph; Ryan Dillon; David Rudman
- Theme music composer: Bud'da
- Composers: Asher Lenz; Stephen Skratt; Fabiola Mendez
- Countries of origin: Canada; United States
- Original language: English
- No. of series: 1
- No. of episodes: 26

Production
- Running time: 22 minutes
- Production companies: Guru Studio; Sesame Workshop

Original release
- Network: Cartoonito; PBS Kids (US); Treehouse TV (Canada)
- Release: April 30, 2022 – November 24, 2023

Mecha Builders (also known as Sesame Street: Mecha Builders) is an animated children's television series and a spin-off of Sesame Street that began production in May 2020. The series is produced by Sesame Workshop and animated by Guru Studio.

The project was announced in October 2019. Visual development was started remotely, due to the COVID-19 pandemic. The series intended to add 80 staff as it entered production.

The first of the two stories comprising the first episode was released on April 26, 2022, on the Sesame Street YouTube channel. The series premiered on May 9, 2022, on Cartoon Network, within its Cartoonito pre-school block. The series was later available on the streaming service HBO Max. The series later became a recurring series of shorts during Sesame Street's 55th season.

== Premise ==
The series focuses on "mecha" versions of three legacy characters: Mecha Abby Cadabby, Mecha Elmo, and Mecha Cookie Monster, all reimagined as mechanical beings with the power to enlarge to giant size in addition to unique built-in tools and gadgets. The trio usually solve a problem using a three-step formula: plan, test, and solve. Some episodes feature Elmo's pet dog Tango, also as a “mecha.”

== Characters ==
=== Main ===
- Mecha Abby Cadabby (voiced by Leslie Carrara-Rudolph) is one of the three Mecha Builders. Mecha Abby is the sole female of the main trio, and acts as the group's leader. Her gadgets include jet boosters in her wings, a flying hologram generator used to outline their plans, and she has the ability to stretch her arms to great lengths in order to reach faraway objects. She represents the planning aspect of the show's problem-solving formula.
- Mecha Elmo (voiced by Ryan Dillon) is one of the three Mecha Builders. Mecha Elmo has high technical powers and is able to assemble many of the devices the team needs (often with some help). His gadgets include wheels in his feet, a safety helmet and visor, and his forearms have the ability to morph his hands into any tool needed for the job, though he typically has to try more than once to get the correct tool. He represents the testing aspect of the show's problem-solving formula.
- Mecha Cookie Monster (voiced by David Rudman) is one of the three Mecha Builders. Mecha Cookie Monster is typically excited when it comes to food and while good-hearted tends to be both dimwitted and skeptical. His gadgets include springs in his feet, the ability to see things to identify, search, or scope out a situation (dubbed the "Goggly Vision"), and his right hand can morph into a large hammerhead (dubbed the "Handy Hammer Hand"), though both hands can also merge into a large rolling drum. He represents the solving aspect of the show's problem-solving formula. After a Mecha Builder shrinks (going "Mecha Tiny") or enlarges (going "Mecha Giant"), Mecha Cookie Monster's chest badge also displays the Cookie Clock, a timer that shows how much time the team has left before they return to normal size.
- Mecha Tango (voiced by Leslie Carrara-Rudolph) is a fourth Mecha Builder, and Mecha Elmo's pet dog. Energetic and unable to communicate outside of dog noises, her abilities include "super-hearing", "super-sniffing" and her "Turbo Tail", in which her tail spins rapidly to allow her to fly.

Additional voices include Alan Aisenberg, Dave Droxler, Krystina Alabado, Jaba Keh, Kaitlin Becker, Ezra Knight, Chris Cafero, Martin P. Robinson, Lilli Cooper, Chanel Umoh, Jorge Cordova, and Matt Vogel.

== Episodes ==
No.	Title	Written by	Original release date	PBS Kids air date	Prod. code	U.S. viewers (millions)
1	"They Sent Us a Pie!"	Joe Fallon	April 26, 2022	May 13, 2024	101	0.07
1	"Dust in the Wind"	Sandra Willard	April 30, 2022	May 13, 2024	101	0.07
When the Mechas notice a giant pie floating above Pretty Big City, they slice it up to share with all their friends. After the last slice is gone, the team learns that the pie was sent by some friendly aliens to stop an asteroid! Now it's up to the Mechas to find something else to catch the asteroid. A quartet of singing stone heads are ready to perform at Big Old Boulder Museum, but they can't stop sneezing. The Mechas have to go "Mecha Tiny" to figure out what's causing the sneezing, and work together to solve the problem before the concert.
2	"Pull Together"	Joe Fallon	May 9, 2022	May 14, 2024	102	0.07
2	"Lift Up and Lift Off!"	Joe Fallon	May 9, 2022	May 14, 2024	102	0.07
The Mechas arrive on the scene to help a park ranger stuck at the bottom of a crevice. The problem multiplies when Mecha Abby gets stuck on a tree branch trying to reach him. The Mechas need to find a way to lift heavy things so they can free Abby from the tree and lift the ranger out. The Mechas’ friend, Zee, is ready to launch his rocket into space, but a launchpad malfunction sends the rocket flying off to the farm instead. Once the Mechas get the rocket back to Zee’s launchpad, they need to figure out how to point it back up toward the sky in time for liftoff.
3	"That Ol' Time Rock Rolls!"	Joe Fallon	May 9, 2022	May 15, 2024	103	0.06
3	"Make Like a Banana and Split!"	Maxwell Nicoll	May 9, 2022	May 15, 2024	103	0.06
Berta is taking a picture with the Big Old Boulder for the city’s museum, but she needs the Mechas' help when the boulder starts rolling down a hill. The Mechas then work together to get the rock back up the hill and to keep it there. It's Food Day in Pretty Big City, and the city is celebrating by unveiling a banana split statue! But when the statue is revealed, the banana atop the banana split statue is not squashed. The Mechas need to fix it quickly before everyone’s ice cream melts.
4	"Magnet Mayhem"	Andrew Moriarty	May 9, 2022	May 16, 2024	104	0.05
4	"Stop That Train"	Andrew Moriarty	May 9, 2022	May 16, 2024	104	0.05
The magnet crane at the construction site is switched on by mistake, sucking up all the metal in the area, including Mecha Cookie and Mecha Abby. The Mechas learn about magnetism as they figure out how Mecha Elmo can stop the pull of the magnet before anything or anyone else gets trapped. Mecha Elmo then gets stuck to the magnet. Marwyn is waiting for an egg delivery at the Treetop Woods Train Station. When the engineer tries to stop the train, the brake lever snaps. The Mechas try different ways to stop the train without breaking any of Marwyn’s eggs.
5	"Picture Perfect Park Party"	Jordan Gershowitz	May 9, 2022	May 17, 2024	105	0.05
5	"Sun Block"	Jordan Gershowitz	May 9, 2022	May 17, 2024	105	0.05
Hero Celebration Day is coming to an end; the big finale is a slideshow of the everyday heroes of Pretty Big City. When the screen rips during the event, the Mechas need to find something flat and opaque to show off the photos and celebrate the city’s heroes properly. The people of Pretty Big City are cooling off on a hot day with an ice slide in the park, but the situation gets slippery when the ice slide starts melting. The Mechas hunt for something to slow down the melting process and protect their friends’ summer fun.
6	"Roll, Chickens, Roll!"	Scott Gray	May 16, 2022	May 20, 2024	106	N/A
6	"Ramp Up, Up, and Away!"	Maxwell Nicoll	May 16, 2022	May 20, 2024	106	N/A
Farmer MacBarm is hosting the Sunny Field Farm Chicken Roll, but the race gets off to a slow start when the chicken's carts don't roll. The Mechas must find a way to keep the chicken's race going. Ranger Nat can't wait to see Pinecone’s Comet, that is, until his telescope falls to the bottom of a cliff. The Mechas must get the telescope back up the mountain before it's too late.
7	"Yip Yip, Book Book!"	Joe Fallon	May 16, 2022	May 21, 2024	107	N/A
7	"Stick To It!"	Clark Stubbs	May 16, 2022	May 21, 2024	107	N/A
It's the Pretty Big All City Read and Izzy and Barb are ready, that is, until all the books go missing. Note: This episode features a special appearance by the Martians. Pretty Big City finds itself in a sticky situation when the factory starts spewing extremely sticky slime everywhere.
8	"The Treasure of Treetop Woods"	Maxwell Nicoll	May 16, 2022	May 22, 2024	108	N/A
8	"Zee Makes an Amazing Maze!"	Scott Gray	May 16, 2022	May 22, 2024	108	N/A
Ranger Nat’s hike turns to adventure when he finds a treasure map. Now he & and the Mecha Builders go on a treasure hunt. They just need to follow the directions on the map. Zee and MacBarm are setting up their corn maze with the help of Zee’s Zee Mobile, that is, until it breaks down inside the maze. The Mecha Builders need to make sure they don't get lost looking for the mobile.
9	"That's the Way the Windmill Blows!"	Miden Wood	May 16, 2022	May 23, 2024	109	N/A
9	"Mecha Machine Makers!"	Joe Fallon	May 16, 2022	May 23, 2024	109	N/A
The broken windmill isn't turning, which means that Sunny Field Farm has no power. The broken windmill needs to turn again so Zee can launch his rocket. The Mechas need to fix the broken windmill blade to get it working again. The Mechas help out Izzy and Timmy with their Rube Goldberg-inspired bird caller for Grandma.
10	"The Need for Feed"	Andrew Moriarty	May 16, 2022	May 24, 2024	110	N/A
10	"The Zipline Sisters of Treetop Woods"	Clark Stubbs	May 16, 2022	May 24, 2024	110	N/A
MacBarm is bringing food to his hungry chickens, that is, until all of the food falls out of his truck. The Mecha Builders must find the perfect container to hold all the feed. Grandma and her twin sister want to recreate their old zipline act, but quickly discover that the zipline no longer exists. The Mechas would therefore have to rebuild the Zipline.
11	"The Whatsacallit of Treetop Woods"	JP Meier	August 29, 2022	May 31, 2024	111	N/A
11	"Nat in the Dark!"	Katiedid Langrock	August 29, 2022	May 31, 2024	111	N/A
Berta is opening an exhibit on the Whatsacallit of Treetop Woods. If only she could get a picture to prove it is real. Gerry and Nat are leading the Treetop Troops on a hike, but Nat finds himself lost in the woods as it gets darker.
12	"Let's Get Rolling!"	Jesse Nicholas	August 30, 2022	June 7, 2024	112	N/A
12	"A Bit of a Stretch"	Clark Stubbs	August 30, 2022	June 7, 2024	112	N/A
It's MacBarm's croquet tournament and Zee made giant decorations but they're too big to get to the farm. It's the opening day of the skyscraper and the Mechas need to put the sphere on top of the building before the ribbon cutting ceremony.
13	"Moo-ving Day!"	Scott Gray	August 31, 2022	June 14, 2024	113	N/A
13	"Follow That Breeze"	Andrew Moriarty	August 31, 2022	June 14, 2024	113	N/A
During Macbarm's sleepover, Zee's growth ray turns Moobert bigger. The Mechas would need to build a shelter big enough to fit her, to protect her from the rainstorm. After Ranger Nat's kite blows away in the wind, the Mechas and Timmy learn to build their own kite to find it.
14	"Cross That Bridge"	Maxwell Nicoll	September 1, 2022	June 21, 2024	114	N/A
14	"Knock Knock! Who's There?"	Joe Fallon	September 1, 2022	June 21, 2024	114	N/A
The train needs to cross the ravine, which becomes difficult when the Martians accidentally break the bridge. The Zee Mobile is great at counting the chickens at the farm, but won't stop crashing into and ruining MacBarm's barn door. While Zee performs some maintenance on the Zee Mobile, the Mechas use different materials to make a new barn door.
15	"Pinecone Palooza"	Stacey Greenberger	September 2, 2022	June 28, 2024	115	N/A
15	"The Big Footed Cavebird"	Jordan Gershowitz	September 2, 2022	June 28, 2024	115	N/A
Grandma and Timmy are entering the Pinecone Art Show by carving a sculpture out of stone, that is, if they can learn how to carve. The Mechas learn how to use old-fashioned tools to help Grandma and Timmy carve their sculpture. Ranger Nat is hiking and comes across the Big-Footed Cave Bird, and realizes it can't get back into her home. The Mechas find out that the bird's door keeps closing, and need to find something to keep the door in place.
16	"Yip Yip, Tree Tree!"	Andrew Moriarty	December 5, 2022	July 5, 2024	116	N/A
16	"The Snowman Scarecrow"	Scott Gray	December 5, 2022	July 5, 2024	116	N/A
When the ornaments on the Pretty Big City tree break, the Mechas must build new ones and save the holidays for their friends. It is time for Zee and MacBarm's gift exchange, but the snowman scarecrow Zee made for MacBarm keeps blowing away. The Mechas had to use some strong materials, so the snowman won't blow away.
17	"All Mechas on Deck"	Miden Wood	December 16, 2022 (New Zealand); January 16, 2023 (United States)	July 12, 2024	117	0.10
17	"Where There's a Wheel There's a Way"	Katiedid Langrock	December 16, 2022 (New Zealand); January 16, 2023 (United States)	July 12, 2024	117	0.10
Lloyd is testing a wind-up powered go-cart, but a problem arises when it keeps running out of energy. Sif's coming in for a landing at the rocket launch site, until her rocket is pushed off course by a satellite.
18	"Silly Hat Catastrophe!"	Maxwell Nicoll	December 20, 2022 (New Zealand); January 17, 2023 (United States)	July 19, 2024	118	N/A
18	"Zee in a Bottle"	Jesse Nicholas	December 20, 2022 (New Zealand); January 17, 2023 (United States)	July 19, 2024	118	N/A
Lloyd is selling Silly Hats at the factory, but when the hat machine malfunctions, it starts raining Silly Hats on Pretty Big City. Zee makes a giant rocket ship in a bottle, but things take a turn when he gets stuck inside.
19	"MacBarm's Day Off"	Andrew Moriarty	December 22, 2022 (New Zealand); January 18, 2023 (U.S.)	July 26, 2024	119	0.08
19	"Playhouse Problem!"	Scott Gray	December 22, 2022 (New Zealand); January 18, 2023 (U.S.)	July 26, 2024	119	0.08
Zee gives MacBarm the day off for what turns out to a busy day, and while he fixes the Zee Mobile, the Mecha Builders and Mecha Tango, have to pick, sort and pack the carrot crops of the recent harvest, a task that is harder than it first appears. Ranger Nat is bringing a playhouse on the train for Timmy and Izzy, but it won't fit through the tunnel.
20	"Can't Stop the Martians!"	Miden Wood	December 26, 2022 (New Zealand); January 19, 2023 (U.S.)	August 2, 2024	120	N/A
20	"The Best Nest Test"	Joe Fallon	December 26, 2022 (New Zealand); January 19, 2023 (U.S.)	August 2, 2024	120	N/A
The Martians come to Pretty Big City but find themselves in need of help when they are unable to land their spaceship. Zee needs to communicate with Sif in outer space. Zee fails to do so because a bird has made its home on top of the satellite dish.
21	"Get in Gear"	Clark Stubbs	December 28, 2022 (New Zealand); January 20, 2023 (U.S.)	August 9, 2024	121	N/A
21	"Free Wheelin' Ferris Wheel"	Miden Wood	December 28, 2022 (New Zealand); January 20, 2023 (U.S.)	August 9, 2024	121	N/A
Panic erupts in Pretty Big City when the big clock breaks and no one is able to tell what time it is. Zee shows off his inventions at his rocket-powered show, including his latest creation, a rocket powered Ferris wheel.
22	"The Legend of Jack O'Lantern" "The Mecha T-Rex"	Scott Gray JP Meier	February 10, 2023 (New Zealand); October 27, 2023 (U.S.)	August 23, 2024	122	N/A
It's Halloween and everything is set for the Zee Mobile to pull the haunted hayride, until it drives away. Timmy could not wait to trick or treat as a Mecha T-Rex, but his Halloween was almost ruined when he could not reach the arms to his costume.
23	"The Escaping Cows of Sunnyfield Farm" "Measure for Measure"	Stacey Greenberger Billy Lopez	February 10, 2023 (New Zealand); November 3, 2023 (U.S.)	August 16, 2024	123	N/A
Zee's new drone accidentally doubles as a cow caller, and the cows keep leaving the farm to go see it. Marwyn attempts to make Pretty Big City's largest cookie, but to do so, he would need a lot of help.
24	"Special Delivery" "Super Duper Sled Slide"	Claire Yorita Lee Harron Atkins	February 10, 2023 (New Zealand); November 10, 2023 (U.S.)	August 30, 2024	124	N/A
The Martians want to help Lloyd deliver packages, but keep breaking them when they drop them from up high. MacBarm and Zee built a slide that sends people all the way across the farm, which means people spend more time walking than sliding.
25	"The Case of the Missing Crystal Pinecone" "The Pretty Big Thing"	Katiedid Langrock Jesse Nicholas	February 10, 2023 (New Zealand); November 17, 2023 (U.S.)	September 6, 2024	125	N/A
Izzy and Timmy go to dig up treasure at the top of Lawrence Pinecone's Statue's shadow, only to find that nothing is there. The mysterious "Pretty Big Thing" is scaring the people of Pretty Big City from going to work, and its identity is yet to be discovered.
26	"Sticky Space Race" "The Big Ice"	Monique D. Hall Pilot Viruet	February 10, 2023 (New Zealand); November 24, 2023 (U.S.)	September 13, 2024	126	N/A
Zee's sticky slime spills on Zee and MacBarm, leaving them stuck together. When Marwyn runs out of ice, the Martians send a giant hunk of ice. All went well until the ice starts sliding towards the skyscraper.

== Broadcast ==
The series debuted in Canada on Treehouse TV.

On January 10, 2023, Channel 5 acquired the UK broadcast rights to the series for their Milkshake! strand, within a Spring 2023 window. The UK broadcasts redubbed the secondary characters with British voice actors as part of an effort by Milkshake! to tell stories aimed at a British preschool audience.

The series aired in the United States on the PBS Kids channel from May 13, 2024, until April 30, 2025.

== Home media ==
All 26 episodes were released on DVD on April 9, 2024, by Shout! Factory.
