= The Not-Too-Late Show with Elmo =

American late-night talk show hosted by Elmo

- Genre: Children's television series; Educational; Late-night talk show
- Based on: Sesame Street by Joan Ganz Cooney; Lloyd Morrisett Muppet characters by Jim Henson
- Presented by: Ryan Dillon
- Starring: Ryan Dillon; David Rudman; Jennifer Barnhart; Peter Linz; Eric Jacobson; Stephanie D'Abruzzo; Matt Vogel
- Narrated by: David Rudman
- Opening theme: "It's Elmo" (instrumental break) by Mama Bear and the Monsters
- Ending theme: "Night-Night (aka. Elmo's Goodnight Lullaby)" by Elmo (season 1) "It's Elmo" (season 2) (instrumental break)
- Composers: Bill Sherman; Joe Fiedler; Ryan Shore
- Country of origin: United States
- Original language: English
- No. of seasons: 2
- No. of episodes: 29

Production
- Running time: 15 minutes
- Production company: Sesame Workshop

Original release
- Network: HBO Max
- Release: May 27, 2020 – December 30, 2021

The Not-Too-Late Show with Elmo is an American late-night talk show hosted by the Muppet character Elmo. It is a spin-off of Sesame Street and was developed exclusively for the HBO Max streaming service. The series, consisting of 13 episodes, debuted on HBO Max on May 27, 2020. The first three episodes were available at launch, after which new episodes were premiered weekly. Each episode runs for 15 minutes. In March 2021, the series was renewed for a second season which premiered on September 30, 2021, when the show moved to the service's Cartoonito section. However, in August 2022, the series was removed from HBO Max. The series aired on PBS Kids from February 10, 2023, to May 10, 2024.

== Premise ==
The Muppet character Elmo hosts the late-night talk show. The American program's main curricular goals are centered around children's bedtime routines, of which each episode demonstrates a different aspect. The program focuses primarily on long-form, in-depth celebrity interviews, designed to help younger viewers connect with others on a deeper level.

The format of the program changed to a game show for the second season, which is alternatively titled The Not-Too-Late Show with Elmo: Game Edition. Child contestants play games and compete in challenges with celebrity guests.

== Cast and characters ==
- Ryan Dillon as Elmo
- David Rudman as Cookie Monster, Baby Bear, Sully, Two-Headed Monster (right head)
- Jennifer Barnhart as Mama Bear, Zoe
- Peter Linz as Ernie, Herry Monster
- Eric Jacobson as Bert, Grover, Oscar the Grouch, Two-Headed Monster (left head)
- Carmen Osbahr as Rosita, Ovejita
- Leslie Carrara-Rudolph as Abby Cadabby
- Frankie Cordero as Rudy
- Stephanie D'Abruzzo as Prairie Dawn, Mae (Elmo's mom)
- Matt Vogel as Big Bird, Count von Count, Biff, Mr. Johnson
- Tyler Bunch as Louie (Elmo's dad)
- Martin P. Robinson as Telly Monster, Freddy (Rudy's dad)
- Pam Arciero
- John Kennedy

The Israeli version features Moishe Oofnik, the Yiddish-influenced curmudgeon famous from Sesame Street's Israeli adaptations, as Elmo's sidekick.

== Episodes ==
Season	Episodes	Originally released	
Season	Episodes	First released	Last released
1	13	May 27, 2020	August 6, 2020
2	16	September 30, 2021	December 30, 2021

=== Season 1 (2020) ===
No. overall	No. in season	Guest	Musical guest	Original release date	PBS Kids air date
1	1	Jimmy Fallon	Kacey Musgraves	May 27, 2020	February 10, 2023
Before bedtime, Elmo takes on the role of talk show host. For his first episode, Elmo's guests are Jimmy Fallon and Kacey Musgraves, who sings the classic Sesame Street song, "Rubber Duckie".
2	2	Jonas Brothers	Jonas Brothers	May 27, 2020	March 31, 2023
The Jonas Brothers guest star on Elmo's show to compete in a Silly Freeze Dance contest and sing a song about blushing teeth. Abby Cadabby's magical fix causes havoc in the control room for Bert and Ernie.
3	3	John Mulaney	Lil Nas X	May 27, 2020	February 17, 2023
Elmo looks inside some goody bags before challenging guest John Mulaney to a tricycle race and dueting with Lil Nas X. Ernie leads a backstage tour in the middle of the show and Cookie Monster gets a special visitor.
4	4	Batman	Pentatonix	June 4, 2020	March 10, 2023
Batman (Victor Joel Ortiz, uncredited) plays a contest of Beach Ball Ballyhoo with Elmo until the Bat Signal appears on the curtain. In search of a perfect bedtime story, Elmo welcomes acapella group Pentatonix, who perform a medley of lullabies. Rosita looks for three sheep so she can tell her favorite bedtime tale and sings a goodnight song.
5	5	Nature Nick	Jordin Sparks	June 11, 2020	February 24, 2023
Animal Trainer Nature Nick brings some animal friends on-set to help teach Elmo about nocturnal creatures. Jordin Sparks sings one of her favorite preschool songs, the "Itsy Bitsy Spider", and shares her favorite thing about night-time. Correspondent Grover goes to Sesame Street to investigate whether the sun should be in bed and to investigate whether it is night.
6	6	Miles Brown	WESLEY	June 18, 2020	March 17, 2023
Elmo competes in a nursery rhyme rap battle contest with Miles Brown and pop sensation WESLEY sings "I Wonder" (which causes Bert and Ernie to be distracted by him). Cookie Monster babysits his little niece, who runs around the studio before her bedtime.
7	7	Blake Lively	Dan + Shay	June 25, 2020	April 7, 2023
Elmo and Cookie Monster talk about weird dreams before they challenge Blake Lively for a contest of "Cookie Monster Says". Duo Dan + Shay perform "I Don't Want to Live on the Moon". Oscar the Grouch prepares to get his chance in the spotlight for "Trash Talk".
8	8	John Oliver/Kwame Alexander	Sofia Carson	July 2, 2020	April 21, 2023
Elmo learns which animal John Oliver would be and they compete in the world's slowest and most dramatic race. Sofia Carson sings a lullaby to Elmo and Kwame Alexander recites an impromptu poem about Elmo.
9	9	Hoda Kotb	Ben Platt	July 9, 2020	May 5, 2023
Elmo learns about Hoda Kotb's morning routine and challenging her to a contest of "Hot Potato". Ben Platt sings "C Is For Cookie" in a duet with Cookie Monster. Grover offers to pack Elmo's backpack for school.
10	10	Mykal-Michelle Harris/Jonathan Van Ness	H.E.R	July 16, 2020	April 14, 2023
Elmo brings in "monster makeover specialist" Jonathan Van Ness to unleash the gorgeous monster inside Sesame Streeter Alan (Alan Muraoka), before Elmo and Cookie unveil hair and makeup transformations of their own. Mykal-Michelle Harris takes over hosting duties for her appearance and faces off with Elmo in a "No Laugh Challenge", and H.E.R. performs a song about her beautiful, versatile hair.
11	11	Andy Cohen	Josh Groban	July 23, 2020	March 3, 2023
Grover is set to appear on Elmo's show, but is nowhere to be found. However, Andy Cohen appears to do his best impression of Grover, while Josh Groban takes Oscar's lead in singing a "trashy" refrain.
12	12	Olivia Wilde	Sara Bareilles	July 30, 2020	March 24, 2023
The Count helps Elmo keep an eye on the clock in preparation for jammie time. Elmo welcomes Olivia Wilde for a contest of "Teddy Bear Dress Up." Musical guest Sara Bareilles brings out two of her besties (Mona Tavakoli and Choska Potter), along with Big Bird, to help her perform her very own version of "Twinkle Twinkle Little Star."
13	13	Jason Sudeikis	Ciara	August 6, 2020	April 28, 2023
Elmo discusses about an important part of his bedtime routine, potty time. After he challenges Jason Sudeikis to a round of the "Silly Dance Game" contest, Ciara performs an inspiring song called "Believe In Yourself". Meanwhile, Grover shakes things up as he plays usher.

=== Season 2 (2021) ===
No. overall	No. in season	Guest	Musical guest	Original release date	PBS Kids air date
14	1	Drew Barrymore	Keedron Bryant	September 30, 2021	June 2, 2023
Skylar and her father sing and play Head, Shoulders, Knees and Toes as if it were hot and cold. Elmo also discusses the seasons with Skylar and Drew Barrymore. Afterwards, the two participate in a snowman building contest. Keedron Bryant then sings about his favorite season, summertime.
15	2	Seth Meyers	Kelly Rowland	September 30, 2021	June 30, 2023
16	3	Brady Noon	WanMor	September 30, 2021	May 12, 2023
17	4	Amber Ruffin	Bebe Rexha	October 7, 2021	August 25, 2023
18	5	Jenna Bush Hager	Sophie Fatu	October 14, 2021	August 18, 2023
19	6	Ames McNamara	Leslie Odom Jr.	October 21, 2021	May 19, 2023
20	7	Dani & Dannah Lane	AJR	October 28, 2021	August 4, 2023
21	8	Rohan Chand	Kane Brown	November 4, 2021	June 16, 2023
22	9	Busy Philipps	N/A	November 11, 2021	July 14, 2023
23	10	Aidy Bryant	Hello Sunday	November 18, 2021	August 11, 2023
24	11	MacKenzie Hancsicsak	Juanes	November 25, 2021	July 28, 2023
25	12	Swayam Bhatia	Tori Kelly	December 2, 2021	July 7, 2023
26	13	Shahadi Wright Joseph	Madison Reyes	December 9, 2021	June 23, 2023
27	14	Tamron Hall	Brandon Niederauer	December 16, 2021	June 9, 2023
28	15	Big Bird (Matt Vogel)	Kelvin Dukes	December 23, 2021	July 21, 2023
29	16	Isaiah Russell-Bailey	James Monroe Iglehart	December 30, 2021	May 26, 2023

== International broadcast ==
In Southeast Asia, the series is aired through HBO Go and episodes are released alongside their HBO Max releases in the United States. In Canada, the series premiered on Treehouse TV on September 5, 2020. In New Zealand, the series premiered on TVNZ OnDemand on January 8, 2021. The show began airing on Cartoon Network in the United States on January 28, 2022, under the Cartoonito brand.

The series premiered on public television on February 10, 2023, on the PBS Kids 24/7 channel, where reruns aired until May 10, 2024. Each broadcast included one 15-minute episode of the show, followed by PBS Kids short series, such as City Island and Jelly, Ben & Pogo, to fill the remaining time of the half-hour timeslot.

Sesame Workshop also produced an Israel adaptation of the series, titled The Talk Show with Elmo (תוכנית האירוח של אלמו), which premiered on Hop! Channel in October 2022. 14 episodes have been produced.

== Production ==
The pilot show was directed by Benjamin Lehmann and was produced in January 2019, and features special guest Kacey Musgraves performing "Rubber Duckie". Full production of the series took place in November and December 2019.

In addition to Musgraves, guests for the first season also included Jimmy Fallon, Jonas Brothers, John Oliver, Victor Joel Ortiz (uncredited) portraying Batman, Jason Sudeikis, Kwame Alexander, Sara Bareilles, Miles Brown, Ciara, Andy Cohen, Dan + Shay, Josh Groban, Mykal-Michelle Harris, H.E.R., Hoda Kotb, Lil Nas X, Blake Lively, John Mulaney, Pentatonix, Ben Platt, Jonathan Van Ness, Olivia Wilde and Sofia Carson. On March 29, 2021, HBO Max renewed the series for a second season.

== Reception ==
The Not-Too-Late Show with Elmo received positive reviews. Review aggregator Rotten Tomatoes gave the first season of the show an 81% "fresh" rating based on 16 reviews with an average rating of 7/10. The critical consensus is: "With great guests, fun games, and a lot of silly songs, The Not-Too-Late Show with Elmo is a fitting bedtime show for tots that parents may even enjoy as well". Metacritic, which assigns a weighted mean rating out of 100, assigned a rating score of 70 based on 8 critic reviews, meaning favorable reviews for the first season.

The show has been reviewed by The Hollywood Reporter, Variety, The Week, and Comic Book Resources among others.

=== Accolades ===
Year	Award	Category	Nominee	Result	Ref.
2021	GLAAD Media Awards	Outstanding Children's Programming	The Not-Too-Late Show With Elmo	Won	
2022	Children's and Family Emmy Awards	Outstanding Preschool Series	The Not-Too-Late Show With Elmo: Game Edition	Nominated	
