= The Muppets Mayhem =

- Genre: Comedy; Musical
- Based on: Characters by Jim Henson
- Developed by: Bill Barretta; Adam F. Goldberg; Jeff Yorkes
- Starring: Lilly Singh; Leslie Carrara-Rudolph; Dave Goelz; Eric Jacobson; Peter Linz; David Rudman; Matt Vogel; Bill Barretta; Saara Chaudry; Tahj Mowry; Anders Holm
- Music by: Mick Giacchino
- Country of origin: United States
- Original language: English
- No. of seasons: 1
- No. of episodes: 10

Production
- Executive producers: Adam F. Goldberg; Bill Barretta; Michael Bostick; Kris Eber; David Lightbody; Leigh Slaughter
- Producer: Matt Sohn
- Production companies: Adam F. Goldberg Productions; The Muppets Studio; ABC Signature

Original release
- Network: Disney+
- Release: May 10, 2023

Related
- Muppets Now (2020)

The Muppets Mayhem is an American musical comedy television series featuring the Muppet musical group Dr. Teeth and the Electric Mayhem. The series was developed by Adam F. Goldberg, Bill Barretta, and Jeff Yorkes for ABC Signature and The Muppets Studio. The series stars Lilly Singh, Tahj Mowry, Saara Chaudry, Anders Holm and Muppet performers Barretta, Dave Goelz, Eric Jacobson, Peter Linz, David Rudman, and Matt Vogel. All ten episodes of The Muppets Mayhem were released on Disney+ on May 10, 2023, and the series received generally positive reviews from critics.

In November 2023, it was announced that the series was cancelled after one season.

This was the final Muppets production to be produced by ABC Signature before the company folded into 20th Television on October 1, 2024.

== Premise ==
Junior A&R executive Nora must deal with the chaos caused by Dr. Teeth and the Electric Mayhem, who go up against the modern musical business as they try to record their first album, which will go platinum.

== Cast and characters ==
=== Main ===
- Lilly Singh as Nora Singh, a junior executive at Wax Town Records.
- Bill Barretta as Dr. Teeth, keyboard player and nominal frontman of The Electric Mayhem.
  - Barretta also performs Davis Cactus.
- Leslie Carrara-Rudolph as Penny Waxman, Nora's boss and Dr. Teeth's ex-girlfriend.
- Dave Goelz as Zoot, Mayhem's spaced-out saxophone player.
  - Goelz also performs Jimmy Shoe and Waldorf.
- Eric Jacobson as Animal, a frenzied monster, Floyd's pet monster and the out-of-control drummer for the Mayhem.
- Peter Linz as Lips, Mayhem's incomprehensible trumpet player.
  - Linz also performs Statler.
- David Rudman as Janice, the Mayhem's flower child lead guitarist.
- Matt Vogel as Floyd Pepper, the sarcastic bass player for the Mayhem and Janice's boyfriend.
- Saara Chaudry as Hannah Singh, Nora's younger sister and a successful social media influencer.
- Tahj Mowry as Gary "Moog" Moogowski, an audio engineer and "super fan" of the Electric Mayhem.
- Anders Holm as JJ, a music executive and Nora's ex-boyfriend.

=== Supporting ===
- David Bizzaro and Stephanie D'Abruzzo as Dr. Teeth's controlling dentist parents, Gerald and Tina Teeth.

Additional Muppet performers include Jordan Brownlee, Alice Dinnean, Bradley Freeman, Jr., Donna Kimball, Tim Lagasse, Bruce Lanoil, Drew Massey, Sarah Sarang Oh, Michael Oosterom, Nicolettte Santino, Stoph Scheer, Michelan Sisti, Art Vega and Alex Villa.

=== Guest ===
- Rachel Bloom as Samantha Swiftie
- Nicole Byer as Beatrice of the Beyhive
- Colton Dunn as Barista
- James Hong as Chef Dan
- Jennifer Irwin as Delilah Gertz
- Riki Lindhome as Justine the Belieber
- Jack McBrayer as Luther McMonster
- Arden Myrin as Annie Waits
- Nico Santos as Jackson Cannery
- Kristen Schaal as Jenny Henderson
- Ben Schwartz as Gus D'Vore
- Joe Lo Truglio as Clark the Mo-Cap Maestro
- Cedric Yarbrough as Police Officer Axl

The following appeared as themselves: Paula Abdul, Steve Aoki, Karamo Brown, Sofia Carson, Charlamagne Tha God, Tommy Chong, Billy Corgan, deadmau5, Desiigner, Morgan Freeman, Susanna Hoffs, Peter Jackson, Kesha, Tommy Lee, Lil Nas X, Cheech Marin, Ziggy Marley, Ryan Seacrest, Kevin Smith, Chris Stapleton, Danny Trejo, "Weird Al" Yankovic and Zedd.

Archival footage is shown from episodes of The Muppet Show featuring Muppet performers Jim Henson as Teeth, Frank Oz as Animal, Jerry Nelson as Floyd and Richard Hunt as Janice, as well as Elton John as himself.

== Episodes ==
No.	Title	Directed by	Written by	Original release date
1	"Track 1: Can You Picture That"	Matt Sohn	Bill Barretta & Adam F. Goldberg & Jeff Yorkes	May 10, 2023
Nora Singh is an assistant at Wax Town Records and is disheartened to learn that her boss is shutting down the company. Going through files while shredding them, she learns that Dr. Teeth and the Electric Mayhem owe the label an album. She convinces the band to come to Los Angeles to record but finds managing their impulses and lack of direction difficult. Things only get more difficult when Dr. Teeth is revealed to be a former lover of Nora's boss, Penny.
2	"Track 2: True Colors"	Matt Sohn	Bill Barretta & Jeff Yorkes	May 10, 2023
Nora tries to get the band to work on the album, and superfan Moog agrees to help. The band gets to work on song ideas by throwing a party while Nora tries to convince Penny not to sell Wax Town's music catalog to their former assistant, JJ, now a wealthy app developer. Janice's allergy to lies complicates matters, so Nora tries to convince Zedd to produce the Mayhem's album.
3	"Track 3: Exile on Main Street"	Matt Sohn	Donielle Muransky	May 10, 2023
Zedd offers to produce the Mayhem's album in his studio but uses samples of them to mix a song through AI. Animal feels angry when he thinks the band no longer needs him so he looks for a regular job. While the band searches for their drummer, Nora gets into an argument with her sister, Hannah, and moves out.
4	"Track 4: The Times They Are A-Changin'"	Matt Sohn	Crystal Shaw	May 10, 2023
Nora, Moog and the Mayhem discover a recording studio (and Cheech & Chong) in the basement of the Shack and decide to self-record their album. However, Moog and Nora clash over what direction to take with the album. Meanwhile, Janice takes it upon herself to make peace between Nora and Hannah.
5	"Track 5: Break on Through"	Robert Cohen	Julie Bean	May 10, 2023
The Mayhem continues to struggle with writing new material for the album so Nora takes them on a retreat to the desert. Events take a turn for the weird when Nora and the band eat a bag of marshmallows that expired 30 years ago and start hallucinating while Moog tries to keep everyone under control.
6	"Track 6: Fortunate Son"	Kimmy Gatewood	Hannah Friedman	May 10, 2023
Nora, Moog and the Mayhem are unpleasantly surprised by a visit from Dr. Teeth's estranged parents, who want him to come home and take over the family dental practice, and Nora tries to help get him back on track. Meanwhile, Animal tries to give Moog an important message about Nora.
7	"Track 7: Eight Days a Week"	Matt Sohn	Jeff Yorkes	May 10, 2023
Nora tries to help build hype for the album by getting Kevin Smith to film a documentary about their recording sessions in eight days. Various issues, mostly the growing love triangle between Moog, Nora, and JJ, heighten the tensions between the band members and cause the filming to descend into chaos. The Electric Mayhem also run into Peter Jackson who is also filming a documentary; they reflect that they haven't seen each other since that night in Wellington when they met the Feebles.
8	"Track 8: Virtual Insanity"	Kimmy Gatewood	Hans Rodionoff & Gabriela Rodriguez	May 10, 2023
Nora and JJ try to publicize the album by introducing The Mayhem to the internet, and autocorrect turns the Mayhem's tweet into a public relations nightmare. JJ uses the media frenzy to book a virtual concert inside Minecraft, much to Moog's displeasure. Meanwhile, JJ tries to convince Nora to move in with him and resume their romantic relationship.
9	"Track 9: Drift Away"	Kimmy Gatewood	Donielle Muransky & Crystal Shaw	May 10, 2023
The album is complete and the Mayhem have been invited to play the Hollywood Bowl. Unfortunately, the band have gotten caught up in their new solo pursuits online. This leads to the Mayhem announcing their split live during a podcast with Charlamagne tha God. Meanwhile, Moog is upset with Nora over the band's distractions and her relationship with JJ.
10	"Track 10: We Will Rock You"	Robert Cohen	Bill Barretta & Adam F. Goldberg & Jeff Yorkes	May 10, 2023
Nora and Moog embark on a mission to reunite the Mayhem in time for the Hollywood Bowl concert. However, after they turn her down, Nora grows despondent and leaves, prompting Animal to take action to save his family.

== Production ==
=== Development ===
Following a performance at the 2016 Outside Lands Music and Arts Festival, Muppet performer and writer Bill Barretta developed a pitch for a series based on Dr. Teeth and the Electric Mayhem. At the same time, Muppet fan Adam F. Goldberg and partner Jeff Yorkes began developing their own project based on the characters; they were interested in a project about the band because they felt their lack of popularity compared to other characters allowed them to "do anything with these guys, because people just know them enough". While Yorkes initially pitched the idea to Goldberg as a feature film, he suggested developing it as a series instead. The three eventually began working together on combining their ideas into a single series.

On February 7, 2022, ABC Signature and The Muppets Studio announced developing a 10-episode series for Disney+ based on The Muppets. Written by Barretta, Goldberg, and Yorkes, The Muppets Mayhem is the first series developed by Goldberg for ABC following his deal with the studio in 2019. The decision to develop a series based on Dr. Teeth and the Electric Mayhem came from the success of a series of music videos on the Muppets' YouTube channel. The series was greenlit shortly before its announcement, after finalizing deals with the Muppet performers. Goldberg and Barretta also executive-produce alongside Michael Bostick, Kris Eber, and The Muppets Studio executives David Lightbody and Leigh Slaughter, while Yorkes is a co-executive-producer.

On November 21, 2023, it was announced that the series would not be picked up for another season.

=== Writing ===
Writers for the series include Julie Bean, Hannah Friedman, Crystal Shaw, Hans Rodionoff, Gabrielle Rodriguez, and Danielle Maransky. According to executive producer Kris Eber, the filmmakers approached the series like a 5-hour-long feature film. The series explores the backstory of Electric Mayhem, which has not been depicted in previous projects; the writers worked closely with the Muppet performers to ensure their ideas stayed faithful to the characters.

The series aimed for a more grounded setting than most Muppet productions, lacking elements such as "talking fruit", with Goldberg saying the show would "[tell] a regular story in the real world with Muppets." Goldberg said this was because he wanted to portray the band as "like real people, real, breathing entities that can be in the real world." The number of Muppet elements and characters present in the series was determined according to how natural they were integrated in the story, such as the appearance of Muppet bunnies, which Barretta described as "something that Animal's always had." While appearances from characters such as Kermit the Frog and Miss Piggy were considered, they were discarded early during development to keep the series focused on Electric Mayhem. Yorkes said the series' comedy would derive from how the band only do whatever they want while Nora tries to lead them in making their album.

=== Casting ===
Along with the series' announcement, it was reported that Lilly Singh would portray Nora, a junior executive struggling with the chaos caused by The Electric Mayhem. Muppet performers Barretta, Dave Goelz, Eric Jacobson, Matt Vogel, David Rudman, and Peter Linz reprised their roles as Electric Mayhem members Dr. Teeth, Zoot, Animal, Floyd Pepper, Janice, and Lips, respectively. On April 5, 2022, it was confirmed that Tahj Mowry joined the cast. On June 9, 2022, Saara Chaudry and Anders Holm joined the cast.

=== Filming ===
Production for The Muppets Mayhem began April 25, 2022, and ended August 5, 2022. Craig Kief serves as director of photography. Matt Sohn and Kimmy Gatewood directed episodes. On July 2, 2022, it was reported that an accident took place in which a crew truck crashed into a tree on the edge of a cliff near the Griffith Observatory.

== Soundtrack ==
Walt Disney Records released a series of soundtrack albums digitally and on streaming on May 10, 2023, alongside a vinyl LP debut album titled The Electric Mayhem featuring the first fourteen tracks of the soundtrack. It featured the original songs Linda Perry wrote and cover versions of popular songs. The soundtrack topped the Billboard Kid Albums chart, the first-ever Muppets album to do so.

== Reception ==
=== Audience viewership ===
On May 4, 2023, according to Jordan Williams of Screen Rant, "The anticipation for The Muppets Mayhem clearly extends beyond its core child fanbase, as the series has generated remarkable buzz with over 1.3 million online interactions, becoming the ninth-most hyped May release on Facebook."

=== Critical response ===
The review aggregator website Rotten Tomatoes reported an approval rating of 86% based on 28 reviews with an average rating of 7.2/10. The site's critics consensus reads: "The Muppets Mayhem might be too slight to find the Rainbow Connection, but its ragtag band of plucky puppets and plethora of showbiz gags make for a solid addition to the franchise. On Metacritic, the series has a weighted average score of 70 out of 100, based on 11 critics, indicating "generally favorable reviews".

=== Accolades ===
Award	Date of ceremony	Category	Nominee(s)	Result	Ref.
Golden Trailer Awards	June 29, 2023	Best Animation/Family Poster for a TV/Streaming Series	The Muppets Mayhem	Won	
Children's and Family Emmy Awards	December 16–17, 2023	Outstanding Children's or Family Viewing Series	Bill Barretta, Adam F. Goldberg, Jeff Yorkes (co-creators/executive producers); Michael Bostick, Kris Eber, David Lightbody, Leigh Slaughter (executive producers); Julie Bean, Hannah Friedman (co-executive producers); Michael Steinbach (producer)	Won	
Children's and Family Emmy Awards	December 16–17, 2023	Outstanding Puppeteer Performance	Eric Jacobson	Nominated	
Children's and Family Emmy Awards	December 16–17, 2023	Outstanding Directing for a Single Camera Program	Robert Cohen, Kimmy Gatewood and Matt Sohn	Nominated	
Children's and Family Emmy Awards	December 16–17, 2023	Outstanding Casting for a Live-Action Program	Collin Daniel, Brett Greenstein, Alexa Pereira, Jen Kasle, Lauren McNeill, Julie Rashid, Kera Schulze	Nominated	
Children's and Family Emmy Awards	December 16–17, 2023	Outstanding Editing for a Single Camera Program	Kevin Kelsey, Kevin Leffler, Alan MacKulin, William Marrinson	Nominated	
Children's and Family Emmy Awards	December 16–17, 2023	Outstanding Puppet Design and Styling	Paul Andrejco, Lauren Attinello, Dani Iglesias, Mary Brehmer, Matt Brennan, Michael Bush, Steph Cathro, Isabelle DuFour, Henri Ewaskio, Jon Gellman, Peter MacKennan, Daniel Martin, Bethany Barton, Zachary Bilemdjian, James Helvin, Sarah Lafferty, Veronica Manoyanm, Danielle Obinger, Keri Smith, Sally Thomas, Jane Gootnick, Gretchen Crookes, Alex “Jürgen” Ferguson, Tim LaGasse, Russ Walko, Stacey Weingarten and Rachel Burson	Nominated	
Nickelodeon Kids' Choice Awards	July 13, 2024	Favorite Kids TV Show	The Muppets Mayhem	Nominated	
Nickelodeon Kids' Choice Awards	July 13, 2024	Favorite Female TV Star (Kids)	Lilly Singh	Nominated	

== Potential future projects ==
Goldberg has expressed interest in developing a "Muppetverse" similar to Marvel Studios and Star Wars stating, "it was like, we're just doing a show about the band; let's focus on this one very specific corner of the Muppet Universe... And from there, let's now kind of branch out and do even more. So that was always our idea. In fact, we were kind of more excited about introducing new Muppet characters. That was always a goal for us." Following the show's cancellation, Goldberg revealed on social media that plans for a Muppetverse were still happening.
