= Sesame Street: Elmo's Musical Monsterpiece =

2012 video game

- North American cover art for Wii, showing the main characters Elmo, Abby Cadabby, The Count and the Honkers Later recurring characters Zoe and Rosita
- Developer(s): Griptonite Games
- Publisher(s): Warner Bros. Interactive Entertainment
- Composer(s): Ozomatli
- Platform(s): Wii; Nintendo DS
- Release: NA: June 15, 2012
- Genre(s): Adventure, edutainment
- Mode(s): Single-player, multiplayer

Sesame Street: Elmo's Musical Monsterpiece is a Sesame Street video game that was released in North America on June 15, 2012, for the Wii and Nintendo DS systems.

The game features Elmo, Abby Cadabby, The Count, the Honkers, Zoe and Rosita and promotes various lessons around music, including instrument and sound identification, different music styles and counting.

Ozomatli provides the game's music.
