= Leslie Carrara-Rudolph =

American actress

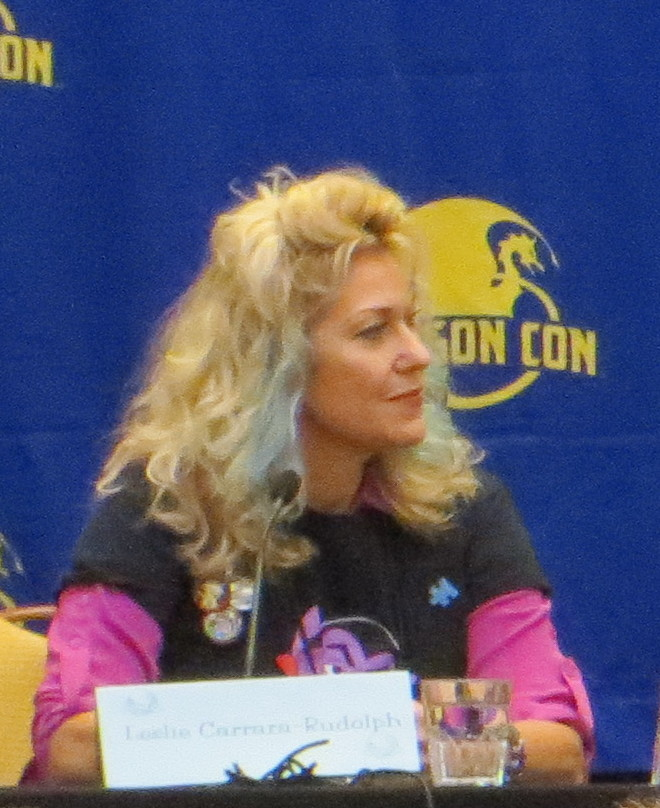
- Carrara-Rudolph at Dragon Con in 2015
- Other names: Leslie Carrara; Leslie Rudolph
- Occupations: Actress; puppeteer
- Years active: 1996–present
- Known for: Sesame Street

Leslie Carrara-Rudolph, sometimes credited as Leslie Carrara, is an American actress and puppeteer. She is best known as a Muppet performer on Sesame Street originating the character Abby Cadabby, for which she has received seven Emmy Award nominations, winning for Outstanding Puppeteer Performer at the 3rd Children's and Family Emmy Awards in 2025.

== Career ==
Carrara-Rudolph began performing with the Muppets in 1996 on the ABC series Muppets Tonight, on which she performed Spamela Hamderson and Darci. Since 1996, Carrara-Rudolph has been a performer on Sesame Street. She originated the role of Abby Cadabby in 2006 and has performed various additional characters. Since 2009, she has received five Emmy Award nominations for Outstanding Performer in a Children's Series.

In 2004, Carrara-Rudolph puppeteered Blue during the first season of the Nick Jr. series Blue's Room. From 2005 to 2008, Carrara-Rudolph performed Ginger in the Playhouse Disney series Johnny and the Sprites. She is one of the founding members of The Jim Henson Company improv group Puppet Up!.

In addition the puppetry, Carrara-Rudolph has provided voiceover for various animated series and video games. From 2010 to 2015, Carrara-Rudolph voiced Peg Puppy in the Nickelodeon animated series T.U.F.F. Puppy. From 2016 to 2018, she voiced Bubbles on Splash and Bubbles. In 2022, she reprised her role as Abby in the Sesame Street animated series Mecha Builders.

In 2023, Carrara-Rudolph performed Penny Waxman in the Disney+ series The Muppets Mayhem.

== Personal life ==
Carrara-Rudolph is married to Paul Rudolph, a music composer for Sesame Street.

== Filmography ==
=== Film ===
Year	Production	Role	Notes
1999	The Adventures of Elmo in Grouchland	Additional Muppets	Performer
2008	Forgetting Sarah Marshall	Dracula Bride	Puppeteer
2008	Abby in Wonderland	Abby Cadabby	Performer; direct-to-DVD film
2011	The Muppets	Additional Muppets	Performer

=== Television ===
Year	Production	Role	Notes
1996–1998	Muppets Tonight	Spamela Hamderson, Darci, Shirley, Dorothy Bovine, Belle the Bubble Mom, Additional Muppets	Performer
1996–present	Sesame Street	Abby Cadabby, Lotta Chatter, Rosa, Sleeping Beauty, Virginia Virginia, Tango, Additional Muppets	Performer
1997–1998	The Wubbulous World of Dr. Seuss	Little Cat A, Morton the Elephant Bird, Princess Tizz, Additional Muppets	Performer
2000–2003	Poochini's Yard	Wendy White	Voice
2003	Animal Jam	Edi the Zebra	Performer
2004	All Grown Up!	Myron	Voice
2004–2005	Blue's Room	Blue	Puppeteer (season 1)
2005–2008	Johnny and the Sprites	Ginger	Performer
2008–2009	Panwapa	Koko the Penguin, Sheep Kid #2	Performer
2008	A Muppets Christmas: Letters to Santa	Additional Muppets	Performer; television special
2009–2011	The Electric Company	Werewolf, Bat, Mummy	Voice
2010–2015	T.U.F.F. Puppy	Peg Puppy	Voice
2015–2024	Nature Cat	Gracie the Toad, Sadie Dog, Rat, Additional voices	Voice
2016–2018	Splash and Bubbles	Bubbles, Flo	Voice
2020	The Not-Too-Late Show with Elmo	Abby Cadabby	Performer
2021–present	Donkey Hodie	Dodie Hodie	Performer
2022–2023	Mecha Builders	Abby Cadabby	Voice
2023	The Muppets Mayhem	Penny Waxman	Performer
2026	The Muppet Show	Supporting Muppet Performer	ABC/Disney+ special

=== Video games ===
Year	Production	Role	Notes
2004	Ratchet & Clank: Up Your Arsenal	Sasha Phyronix	Voice
2005	Ratchet: Deadlocked	Commander Sasha, Tyrranhoid Bride, Slugha	Voice
2011	Sesame Street: Ready, Set, Grover!	Abby Cadabby	Voice
2012	Sesame Street: Elmo's Musical Monsterpiece	Abby Cadabby	Voice
2012	Kinect Sesame Street TV	Abby Cadabby	Voice
2025	Disney Villains Cursed Café	Yzma	Voice; Grouped under "Featuring the Voice Talents Of"
2026	Disney Speedstorm	Yzma	Voice; Grouped under "Featuring the Voice Talents Of"

== Awards and nominations ==
Year	Award	Category	Work	Result	Refs
2009	Daytime Emmy Awards	Outstanding Performer in a Children's Series	Sesame Street	Nominated	
2011	Daytime Emmy Awards	Outstanding Performer in a Children's Series	Sesame Street	Nominated	
2012	Daytime Emmy Awards	Outstanding Performer in a Children's Series	Sesame Street	Nominated	
2014	Daytime Emmy Awards	Outstanding Performer in a Children's Series	Sesame Street	Nominated	
2015	Daytime Emmy Awards	Outstanding Performer in a Children's Series	Sesame Street	Nominated	
2023	Children's and Family Emmy Awards	Outstanding Puppeteer Performer	Sesame Street	Nominated	
2024	Children's and Family Emmy Awards	Outstanding Puppeteer Performer	Sesame Street	Won	
2025	Children's and Family Emmy Awards	Outstanding Puppeteer Performer	Sesame Street	Won	

Preceded by Fran Brill	Performer of Goldilocks (2012–present)	Succeeded by None
Preceded by None	Abby Cadabby (2006–present)	Succeeded by None
Preceded by Kevin Clash	Performer of Baby Natasha (2014–present)	Succeeded by None
