= Sarah Burgess (actress) =

British actress

- Born: 7 June 1970 (age 55); Brighton, England
- Occupations: Actress; puppeteer
- Years active: 1997–present

Sarah Burgess (born 7 June 1970) is a British actress and puppeteer who played Phoebe Furchester-Fuzz in the Sesame Street spin-off series The Furchester Hotel for CBeebies.

== Life ==
Burgess was born in Brighton in 1970. She became a puppeteer in about 1997 after working with Wizadora's puppeteers as their prop assistant.

Her roles include Trixie and the UK dub of Stingy on the television series LazyTown, Brassy The Rat in the CBeebies series Space Pirates, Fifi le Fleur for Ed and Oucho (CBBC), and was a puppeteer on The Dark Crystal (Netflix series) and the film Solo: A Star Wars Story. She also puppeteered on the West End production of Doctor Dolittle and as an actress and puppeteer in The Sleeping Beauty, Fantastic Mr Fox, Philemon and Baucis, The Frog Prince, Odessa and the Magic Goat, The Talkative Tortoise, and The Prince and the Mouse for The Little Angel Puppet Theatre in Islington and has played Ojo on the European tour of Bear in the Big Blue House. Sarah has also worked on Bunnytown, Teletubbies, Rosie and Jim and Wizadora.
