= Little Angel Theatre =

Puppet theatre in London

- Little Angel Marionette Theatre
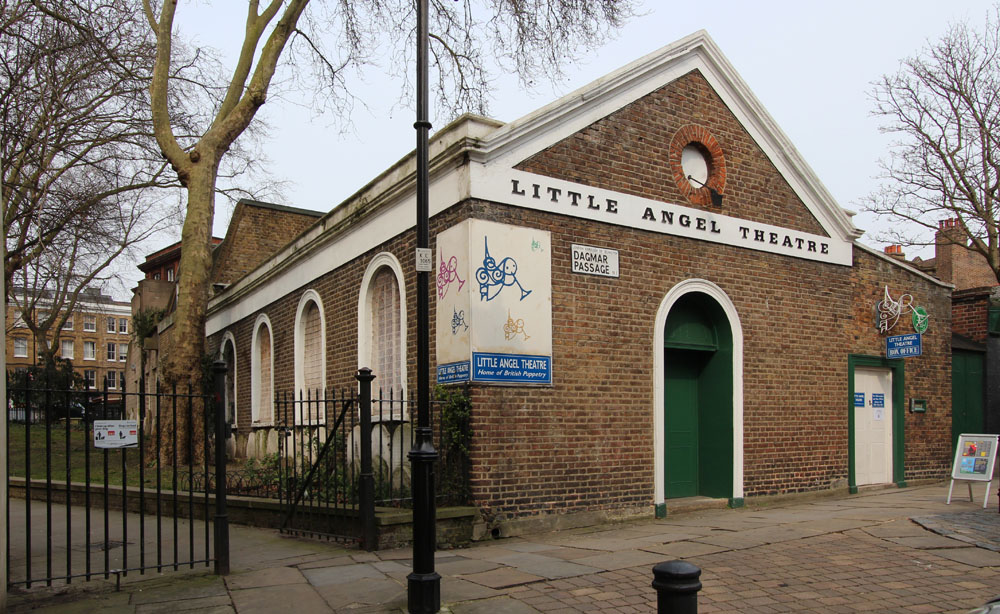
- Interactive map of Little Angel Theatre
- Location: Islington; London, N1; England
- Coordinates: 51.5387°N 0.1016°W
- Capacity: 100 seats
- Type: Puppet theatre
- Current use: Theatre
- Production: Own and touring
- Public transit: Angel; Essex Road

Construction
- Opened: 24 November 1961; 64 years ago

Website
- Little Angel Theatre

Little Angel Theatre is a puppet theatre for children and their families based in the London Borough of Islington.

The 100-seat theatre, a former temperance hall, was opened on 24 November 1961 by founders John and Lyndie Wright, with a performance of The Wild Night Of The Witches. It is one of a few in the world that have an elevated platform from which puppeteers perform. Their son Joe Wright would also work at the theatre.

As well as being a recognised theatre, Little Angel Theatre works with its local communities with an aim to tackle barriers to arts engagement so all can benefit and enjoy the art form of puppetry.

Puppeteers who have entertained here include Sarah Burgess who has created several roles for CBeebies, as well as Rainbow puppeteer Ronnie Le Drew.

The theatre's creative learning department work with schools and youth and community groups, running a wide variety of participation activities.

The theatre has programmed adaptations of popular children's books such as Pip and Posy, The Storm Whale, I want my hat back and A squash and a squeeze.

An exhibition of marionettes by the theatre in 2026 aimed to raise their profile and to get more pupeteers to make them. A new workshop at the theatre is planned to open up to encourage puppet making.

Little Angel Theatre is a registered charity, has 21 employees and has Michael Rosen, Judi Dench and Simon Rattle as patrons.
