= Ryan Dillon =

American puppeteer (born 1988)

- Born: May 25, 1988 (age 38); Philadelphia, Pennsylvania, U.S.
- Occupation: Puppeteer
- Years active: 2005–present
- Employer: The Jim Henson Company
- Known for: Performing Elmo

Ryan Dillon (born May 25, 1988) is an American puppeteer. He has performed Elmo on Sesame Street since 2013. He has served as a puppeteer for The Jim Henson Company and The Muppets.

== Early life and career ==
Dillon was born on May 25, 1988, in Philadelphia, Pennsylvania. As a young puppeteer, he came to the attention of Sesame Street producers when he attended an audition as a high school student. In 2005, he took time away from school during his senior year to participate in the production of season 37. In 2013, he succeeded Kevin Clash as the performer for Elmo following Clash's resignation from Sesame Street in November 2012. Beginning in 2019, he succeeded Richard Hunt as Don Music.

Dillon has taught classes in television puppetry at Pennsylvania State University, and various schools and centers in the United States. He has served as a puppet performer for Kraft MilkBite commercials, Julie's Greenroom, The Muppets Take the Bowl, The Muppets Take the O2, the Nickelodeon webseries Ask Sylvia, and John Tartaglia's ImaginOcean (2010).

In March 2017, Dillon was nominated for the Daytime Emmy Award for Outstanding Performer in Children's Programming.

== Filmography ==
| Years | Title | Role | Notes |
|---|---|---|---|
| 2005–present | Sesame Street | Elmo, Don Music | |
| 2014–2017 | The Furchester Hotel | Elmo, Guinea Pig (ep. 12), Mail Bird (ep. 68), Christmas Elf on Phone (ep. 68), Mr. Peckwood (ep. 74), Cat Bride (ep. 96) | |
| 2016 | The Toycracker: A Mini-Musical Spectacular | Elmo | TV short; uncredited |
| 2019 | Sesame Street's 50th Anniversary Celebration | Don Music, Elmo, Lefty the Salesman, Roosevelt Franklin (puppetry only) | |
| 2020–2021 | The Not-Too-Late Show with Elmo | Elmo | |
| 2022–present | Mecha Builders | Mecha Elmo (voice) | |
| 2026 | The Muppet Show | Guest Starring Muppet Performer | |

== Awards and nominations ==
| Year | Award | Category | Work | Result | Refs |
|---|---|---|---|---|---|
| 2023 | Children's and Family Emmy Awards | Outstanding Puppeteer Performance | Sesame Street | Won | |
| 2025 | Children's and Family Emmy Awards | Outstanding Puppeteer Performance | Sesame Street | Nominated | |
