= David Rudman =

American puppeteer (born 1963)

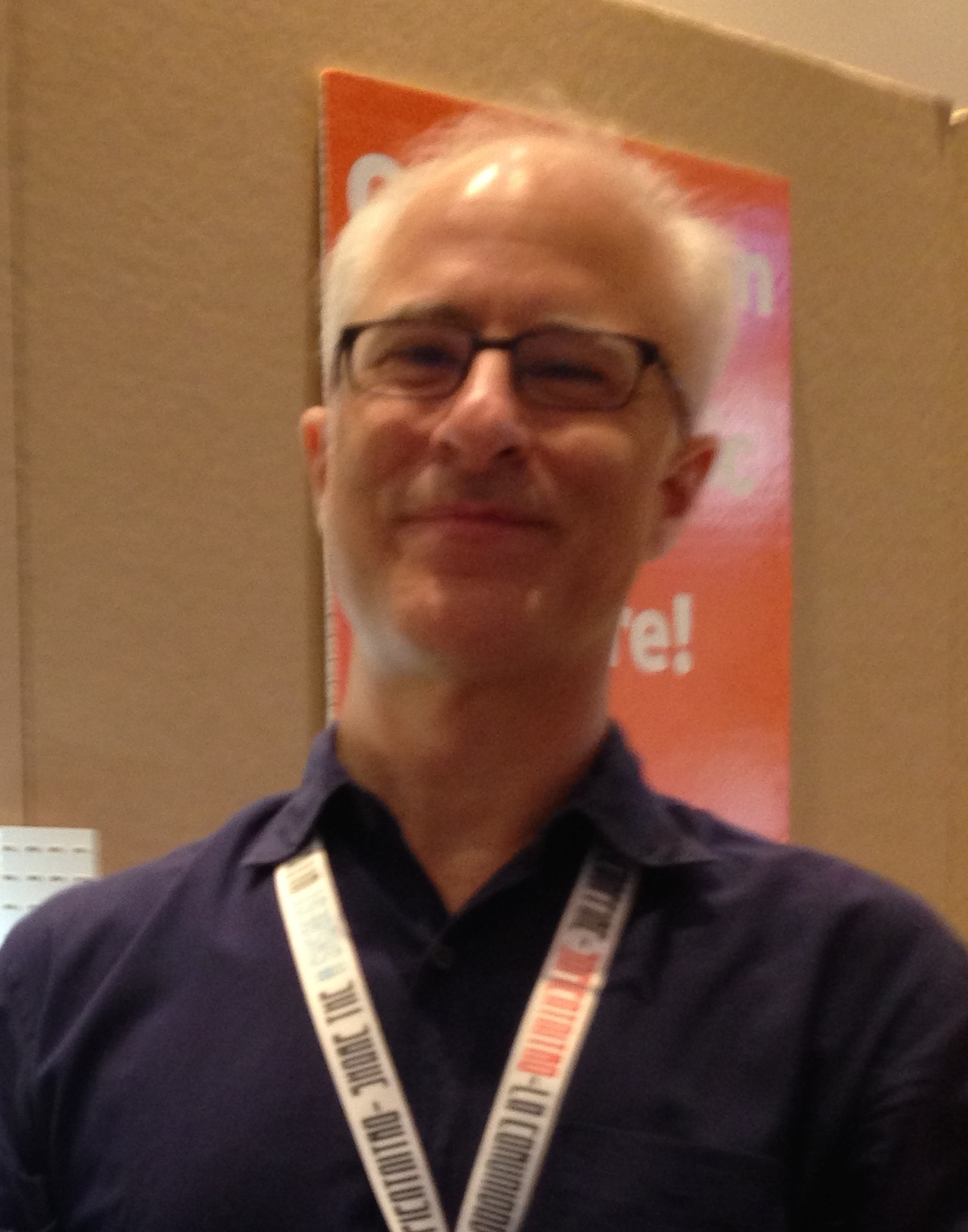
- Rudman at SXSW in 2015
- Born: June 1, 1963 (age 63); Chicago, Illinois, U.S.
- Occupations: Puppeteer; puppet builder; writer; director; producer
- Years active: 1981–present

David Rudman (born June 1, 1963) is an American puppeteer, puppet builder, writer, director, and producer. He performs the roles of Scooter, Janice, and Beaker for The Muppets, as well as Cookie Monster and Baby Bear on Sesame Street.

== Career ==
Rudman has been a performer on Sesame Street since 1985. He currently performs Cookie Monster (since 2001), Baby Bear, and the right head of the Two-Headed Monster (since 1998). For his work on the series, he has received four Emmy nominations for Outstanding Performer in a Children’s Series. He has directed several Sesame Street web videos.

In addition to his work on Sesame Street, Rudman is a performer with the Muppets, where he succeeded many roles originally portrayed by Richard Hunt, including Scooter, Janice, Bobby Benson, and Wayne. Following the departure of Steve Whitmire in 2016, Rudman became the performer for Beaker the following year.

=== Spiffy Pictures ===
Spiffy Pictures
- Type: Private
- Industry: Television production
- Founded: 2003; 23 years ago
- Founders: David Rudman; Adam Rudman
- Headquarters: Chicago, Illinois
- Products: Television programs
- Website: https://spiffypictures.com/

Spiffy Pictures is a Chicago-based production company that was founded by David Rudman and his brother Adam Rudman in 2003. The studio consists mainly of live-action television shows developed for children's television networks.

Rudman is co-owner of Spiffy Pictures where he has co-created, executive produced, directed and performed in Jack's Big Music Show (Noggin), Curious Buddies (Nick Jr.), Bunnytown (Playhouse Disney), Scooby-Doo! Adventures: The Mystery Map (Warner Bros.), Frankie and Frank (Nick Jr.), and Donkey Hodie (PBS Kids). He is also the creator and executive producer of the animated series Nature Cat (PBS Kids), on which he voices several characters, including Leo the Mammoth, Prospector Jones, Nevin, and the Seeker.

== Personal life ==
Rudman attended Highland Park High School and graduated in 1981. He has been a speaker at the school's biennial Focus on the Arts program since 2003. He attended college at the University of Connecticut.

In 2005, Rudman spoke at the graduation ceremony for the Illinois Institute of Art – Chicago.

== Filmography ==
=== Film ===
Year	Production	Role	Other notes
1984	The Muppets Take Manhattan	Additional Muppets	Performer
1986	Labyrinth	Goblins	Puppeteer
1992	The Muppet Christmas Carol	Swedish Chef, Wander McMooch	Performer
1993	Billy Bunny's Animal Songs	Frog, Gopher, Penguin, Percival Bear, Termite	Performer
1995	Mr. Willowby's Christmas Tree	Ned Mouse	Performer; television film
1999	The Adventures of Elmo in Grouchland	Baby Bear, Caterpillar, Pestie, Collander Stenchman, Ice Cream Customer, Alarm Clock Bird, Fat Blue Customer, Gassy Grouch, Grouch Prisoner	Performer
2008	Abby in Wonderland	Cookie Monster	Performer; direct-to-DVD film
2011	The Muppets	Scooter, Janice, Miss Poogy, Wayne, Bobby Benson, Singing Food	Performer
2013	Scooby-Doo! Adventures: The Mystery Map	Scooby-Doo	Puppeteer; direct-to-DVD film
2014	Muppets Most Wanted	Scooter, Janice, Miss Poogy, Wayne, Bobby Benson	Performer

=== Television ===
Year	Production	Role	Other notes
1985–present	Sesame Street	Cookie Monster, Baby Bear, Sully, Sonny Friendly, Humphrey, Flo Bear	Performer
1985	Little Muppet Monsters	Boo Monster	Performer
1986	The Tale of the Bunny Picnic	Snort, Snail, Additional Muppets	Performer; television special
1987	A Muppet Family Christmas	Additional Muppets, Miss Piggy's Photographer (voice)	Performer; television special
1987–89	The Jim Henson Hour	Additional Muppets	Performer
1989	The Ghost of Faffner Hall	Earl the Dragon	Performer
1990	The Cosby Show	Sweetums, Boo Monster	Performer
1990	The Earth Day Special	Lizard	Performer; television special
1990	The Magical World of Disney	Dog, Frog,	Performer
1991	Big Bird's Birthday or Let Me Eat Cake	Athena, Chicago the Lion	Performer; television special
1991–92	Dinosaurs	Additional Dinosaurs	Performer; 2 episodes
1993	Sesame Street Stays Up Late!	Baby Bear, MNN Logo Orange Monster, Grouches, AM Monsters	Performer; television special
1993–94	CityKids	Dread, Frankie Frank, Lieutenant, Koozbanians, Toya	Performer
1994	Dog City	Bowser	Voice; 1 episode
1996	Aliens in the Family	Bobut, Orange and Purple Yukkles	Performer
1997	Muppets Tonight	Additional Muppets	Performer
2002–07	Play with Me Sesame	Cookie Monster, Chicago the Lion, Ernestine	Performer
2004–05	Curious Buddies		Co-creator, executive producer
2005–07	Jack's Big Music Show	Jack	Performer, co-creator, executive producer
2007–08	Bunnytown	Yellow Cave Bunny, Hoppy Funtooth, Blue Bunny Musician	Performer, co-creator, executive producer
2008	Studio DC: Almost Live	Janice, Scooter	Performer
2008	A Muppets Christmas: Letters to Santa	Janice, Scooter	Performer; television special
2009	Dinner: Impossible	Cookie Monster	Performer; 1 episode
2009–10	Where is Warehouse Mouse?		Director
2012	Jimmy Kimmel Live!	Janice	Performer; 1 episode
2013	Lady Gaga and the Muppets Holiday Spectacular	Janice, Scooter	Performer; television special
2014–16	The Furchester Hotel	Cookie Monster, Gonger, Sorbet	Performer
2015–16	The Muppets	Scooter, Janice, Satay	Performer
2015–25	Nature Cat	Leo the Mammoth, Additional voices	Voice, co-creator, executive producer
2019	Drop the Mic	Beaker	Performer; 1 episode
2019	Lip Sync Battle	Cookie Monster	Performer; 1 episode
2020	The Not-Too-Late Show with Elmo	Cookie Monster	Performer
2020	Muppets Now	Scooter, Janice, Beaker, Miss Poogy	Performer
2021	Muppets Haunted Mansion	Scooter, Janice, Beaker, Wayne, Squid Ghost	Performer; Disney+ special
2021–present	Donkey Hodie	Bob Dog, Grampy Hodie, Stanley the Dragon	Performer, co-creator, executive producer
2022	Mecha Builders	Mecha Cookie Monster	Voice
2023	The Muppets Mayhem	Janice	Performer
2026	The Muppet Show	Scooter, Janice, Beaker, Miss Poogy (uncredited)	Performer; Disney+ special

=== Other appearances ===
Year(s)	Production	Role	Other notes
1991	Muppet*Vision 3D	Roy, Max	Performer, theme park show
2003	Sesame Street 4-D Movie Magic	Cookie Monster, Two-Headed Monster	Performer, theme park film
2021	The Muppets' Christmas Caroling Coach	Beaker	Voice, theme park show
2025	World of Color Happiness!	Scooter, Janice, Beaker	Performer (prerecorded footage), theme park pre-show
2026	Rock 'n' Roller Coaster Starring The Muppets	Scooter, Janice, Beaker	Performer (Audio-Animatronic voice and prerecorded footage); theme park attraction

Preceded by Richard Hunt	Performer of Scooter; 2008–present	Succeeded by None
Preceded by Richard Hunt	Performer of Janice; 2008–present	Succeeded by None
Preceded by Jim Henson	Performer of the Swedish Chef; 1992	Succeeded by Bill Barretta
Preceded by Richard Hunt	Performer of Bobby Benson; 2011–present	Succeeded by None
Preceded by Richard Hunt	Performer of Wayne; 2011–present	Succeeded by None
Preceded by Martin Robinson	Performer of Mommy Snuffleupagus; 1989–1992	Succeeded by Noel MacNeal
Preceded by Richard Hunt	Performer of Sully; 1992–present	Succeeded by None
Preceded by Richard Hunt	Performer of Sonny Friendly; 1992–2000	Succeeded by None
Preceded by Adam Hunt	Performer of Two-Headed Monster (right head); 1998–present	Succeeded by None
Preceded by Frank Oz	Performer of Cookie Monster; January 2, 2001 – present	Succeeded by None
Preceded by Steve Whitmire	Performer of Beaker; September 2, 2017 – present	Succeeded by None
Preceded by None	Performer of Miss Poogy; September 1, 2011 – present	Succeeded by None
Preceded by None	Performer of Baby Bear; April 29, 1991 – present	Succeeded by None
