= The Adventures of Elmo in Grouchland =

1999 musical adventure comedy film

- Theatrical release poster
- Directed by: Gary Halvorson
- Screenplay by: Mitchell Kriegman; Joey Mazzarino
- Story by: Mitchell Kriegman
- Based on: Sesame Street by: Joan Ganz Cooney; Lloyd Morrisett; Elmo by Jim Henson
- Produced by: Alex Rockwell; Marjorie Kalins
- Starring: Kevin Clash; Mandy Patinkin; Vanessa Williams
- Cinematography: Alan Caso
- Edited by: Alan Baumgarten
- Music by: John Debney
- Production companies: Jim Henson Pictures; Children's Television Workshop
- Distributed by: Columbia Pictures (through Sony Pictures Releasing)
- Release date: October 1, 1999
- Running time: 73 minutes
- Country: United States
- Language: English
- Budget: $26 million
- Box office: $11.7 million

The Adventures of Elmo in Grouchland (a.k.a. simply Elmo in Grouchland) is a 1999 American musical adventure comedy film directed by Gary Halvorson (in his feature directorial debut) from a screenplay written by Mitchell Kriegman and Joey Mazzarino, based on a story conceived by Kriegman. This was the second of the two theatrical feature films based on the children's television series Sesame Street, after Sesame Street Presents: Follow That Bird in 1985. It stars Mandy Patinkin and Vanessa Williams alongside Muppet performers Kevin Clash, Caroll Spinney, Steve Whitmire, and Frank Oz. It features songs written by a wide range of songwriters, including Siedah Garrett, Jeff Elmassian, Andy Rehfeldt, Martin Erskine, Seth Friedman, and Michael & Patty Silversher, with a score composed and conducted by John Debney.

Produced by Columbia Pictures, Jim Henson Pictures and Children's Television Workshop, the film was released by Sony Pictures Releasing on October 1, 1999. The film received mixed reviews from critics, and was a box-office disappointment, grossing $11.7 million against a budget of $26 million.

The film was one of the few Sesame Street productions produced directly by The Jim Henson Company. This was the final Muppet feature film to involve Fran Brill and Oz, who retired from being full-time puppeteers the following years, and the last Muppet film to feature Spinney before his retirement in 2018 and his death in 2019.

== Plot ==
Bert and Ernie ask the audience to count down from 10 to start the film; Ernie occasionally has to comfort Bert when something in the film worries him.

One day, Elmo plays with his blanket in his bedroom of his apartment until he accidentally spills orange juice on it and takes it to the laundromat. Afterward, he meets his friend Zoe, who is upset, so Elmo tries to cheer her up. Zoe wants to hold the blanket, but Elmo refuses to share it, leading to a tug-of-war that tears it. Elmo furiously denounces Zoe as his friend until Telly Monster, who is roller-skating out of control, accidentally swipes the blanket, leading to a chase around Sesame Street followed by Super-Grover racing between them. The blanket ends up falling into the hands of Oscar the Grouch, who throws it in his trash can. Unwilling to wait for Oscar, Elmo dives into the bottom of the trash can, where he finds his blanket snagged on a door.

Attempting to retrieve it, he and his blanket are teleported to Grouchland, a city filled with Grouches, trash, and Huxley, a greedy man who steals anything he sees, including Elmo's blanket. A kind Grouch girl named Grizzy tells Elmo that his blanket is in Huxley's castle, which is on the top of the faraway Mount Pickanose. A plant named Stuckweed encourages Elmo that he will make it if he takes his first step, so Elmo sets out on a quest to retrieve his blanket. Meanwhile, Zoe, Telly, Gordon, Maria, Cookie Monster, and Big Bird, with help from Oscar, go to Grouchland to find Elmo. When they try to ask a Grouch police officer for assistance, they are arrested and thrown into The Grouchland Jail, as they are informed that it is against the law to ask for help in Grouchland.

Huxley has his anthropomorphic bug sidekick Bug and his henchmen, the Pesties, trap Elmo in a cave, but he gets out with the help of fireflies. Huxley then has Bug and the Pesties misdirect Elmo into a garbage dump, where he is brought before the Queen of Trash for trespassing. Her citizens suspect that he might be a spy for Huxley, which causes Elmo to regret not sharing his blanket with Zoe, but the Queen tests him, asking him to blow 100 raspberries for her in 30 seconds. Elmo succeeds with help from the audience, and the Queen allows him to pass through. Huxley then sends in a giant chicken named Tiny, who tosses Elmo far away, causing him to decide to give up on retrieving his blanket. Meanwhile, Grizzy sneaks into the jail and informs Elmo's friends that he has gone to Huxley's castle. After admitting that Elmo is his friend, Oscar convinces all the Grouches to cooperate, since it is the only way to stop Huxley from stealing their trash. The Sesame Street residents are then released so that they and the Grouches can go to Huxley's castle to fight back and rescue Elmo.

The next morning, a caterpillar convinces Elmo that he has what it takes to be brave. Elmo arrives at Huxley's castle and reclaims his blanket, but he falls into a basket and Huxley decides to make him and his blanket his property. However, the Sesame Street and Grouchland citizens arrive, and Huxley tries to escape with Elmo's blanket, only for Bug to suck it up via the nozzle on Huxley's helicopter, and Elmo incapacitates Huxley by launching the basket over his shoulders. Having been sympathetic to Elmo, Bug refuses Huxley's demand for the blanket and instead returns it to Elmo.

Elmo returns to Sesame Street with his friends, where he apologizes to Zoe and allows her to hold his blanket. She accepts his apology and agrees to resume their friendship, and Elmo thanks the audience for their help and says goodbye. Bert and Ernie cheer for Elmo's success and go home.

== Cast ==
- Mandy Patinkin as Huxley
- Vanessa Williams as the Queen of Trash

=== Humans of Sesame Street ===
- Sonia Manzano as Maria Rodriguez
- Roscoe Orman as Gordon Robinson
- Alison Bartlett-O'Reilly as Gina Jefferson
- Ruth Buzzi as Ruthie
- Emilio Delgado as Luis Rodriguez
- Loretta Long as Susan Robinson
- Bob McGrath as Bob Johnson
- Drew Allison as snow cone vendor (cameo only)

=== Sesame Street Muppet performers ===
- Kevin Clash as Elmo, Pestie, and Grouch Jailer
- Fran Brill as Zoe, Pestie, Prairie Dawn, and Grouches
- Stephanie D'Abruzzo as Grizzy, Pestie, and Grouchland Residents
- Bill Barretta as Grouch Cab Driver and Grey Grouch
- Dave Goelz as Humongous Chicken and Grouch Mouse
- Brian Henson as Donkey
- Joseph Mazzarino as Bug, Pestie, Laughing Grouch, and Grouch Chef
- Jerry Nelson as Count von Count, Pestie, Grouch Mayor, Grouch Cop, and Mr. Johnson (shared role with David Rudman)
- Carmen Osbahr as Rosita
- Martin P. Robinson as Telly Monster, Pestie, and Laundromat Manager
- David Rudman as Baby Bear, Caterpillar, Pestie, Collander Stenchman, Ice Cream Customer, Alarm Clock Bird, Gassy Grouch, and Grouch Prisoner
- Caroll Spinney as Big Bird and Oscar the Grouch
- Steve Whitmire as Ernie, Football Stenchman, Stuckweed, Bad Humor Man, Parrot, Sharon Groan, Grouch Prisoner, and Grouchland Resident
- Frank Oz as Bert, Grover/Super Grover, and Cookie Monster

Additional characters performed by: Drew Allison, Bruce Lanoil, Bob Lynch, John Boone, Ed May, R. Lee Bryan, Tim Parati, Leslie Carrara, Annie Peterle, Lisa Consolo, Andy Stone, Jodi Eichelberger, Lisa Sturz, Rowell Gormon, Kirk Thatcher, Mary Harrison, Matt Vogel, Rob Killen, and Matt Yates

== Production ==
=== Casting ===
All the puppeteers who performed the primary Sesame Street characters (such as Kevin Clash, Jerry Nelson, Caroll Spinney, and Fran Brill) were called to Wilmington, North Carolina, for the table read on May 19, 1998. The regular puppets were used for the normal Sesame Street characters, and puppets for assorted Grouches (including Grizzy) were designed and built by Mark Zezsotek. Paul Andrejco, Muppet designer for Bear in the Big Blue House, also designed Humungous Chicken. Sonia Manzano reprised her role as Maria, and Roscoe Orman reprised his role as Gordon. Vanessa Williams was cast as the Queen of Trash, and the hairstylist colored her hair green for the role. Mandy Patinkin was a last-minute replacement for Harland Williams, who was initially cast to play Huxley. For the role, the makeup artist designed false eyebrows for Patinkin to wear, making him appear to have bushier eyebrows than usual.

=== Filming ===
The film was shot over 30 days beginning on June 1, 1998 at the EUE/Screen Gems studio in Wilmington, North Carolina. The set was raised so puppeteers could stand up rather than squat below street level, as usual. Filming wrapped and visual effects by D.Rez were added during the following month, and Ernie and Bert's reassurance scenes were shot later in New York in 1999 following test screenings, with Matt Vogel assisting Steve Whitmire in performing Ernie and Eric Jacobson assisting Frank Oz with Bert.

=== Music ===
==== Songs ====
1. "Together Forever" – Elmo, Big Bird, Rosita, Prairie Dawn, Count von Count, Baby Bear, Laundromat Manager, Sock Quartet, Gordon, Gina, Susan, Luis, Bob (Written by Michael Silversher and Patty Silversher; produced by Jeff Elmassian and Siedah Garrett)
2. "Welcome to Grouchland" – The Grouchland Ensemble (Written by Martin Erskine and Seth Friedman; produced by Martin Erskine)
3. "Take the First Step" – Stuckweed (Written by Michael Reagan and Greg Matheson; produced by Jeff Elmassian and Siedah Garrett)
4. "Make It Mine" – Mandy Patinkin, Fran Brill, Stephanie D’Abruzzo, Kevin Clash, Ivy Austin (Written by Martin Erskine and Seth Friedman; produced by Martin Erskine)
5. "I See a Kingdom" – Vanessa Williams (Written by Siedah Garrett, Jeff Elmassian, and Andy Rehfeldt; produced by Jeff Elmassian and Siedah Garrett)
6. "Precious Wings" – Tatyana Ali (Written by Siedah Garrett, Jeff Elmassian, and Andy Rehfeldt; produced by Keith Thomas)

There was a song called ''All Alone'' which was to be sung by Elmo as he spends the night on the cliffside of Mount Pickanose. The scene was fully filmed but was cut after it upset children during test screenings.

==== Soundtrack ====
The Adventures of Elmo in Grouchland

Soundtrack album by Sesame Street
- Released: 1999
- Genre: Soundtrack
- Label: Jim Henson

Sesame Street chronology
Elmo Saves Christmas (1998)	The Adventures of Elmo in Grouchland (1999)	CinderElmo (2000)

This 1999 album is the soundtrack to The Adventures of Elmo in Grouchland.

This album won the Grammy Award for Best Musical Album for Children in 2000.

"Make It Mine" is not included on the soundtrack.

===== Track list =====
1. "Together Forever" - 3:04
2. "Welcome to Grouchland" - 2:17
3. "Take the First Step" - 2:31
4. "Make It Mine" - Mandy Patinkin - 3:38
5. "I See a Kingdom" - Vanessa Williams - 3:16
6. "Precious Wings" - Tatyana Ali - 4:28
7. Elmo Tells His Grouchland Story (Spoken Word) - 12:42
8. "The Grouch Song" - Elmo, Grizzy, Oscar the Grouch (Written by Jeff Moss) - 2:13
9. "There's a Big Heap of Trash at the End of the Rainbow" - The Stenchmen (Written by Tony Geiss) - 2:24
10. "I Love Trash" - Steven Tyler - 3:34

== Release ==
=== Book series ===
The film inspired a trilogy of children's books, published in 1999 by Random House: Happy Grouchy Day, The Grouchiest Lovey, and Unwelcome to Grouchland. The book series was written by Suzanne Weyn and illustrated by Tom Brannon.

=== Home media ===
On December 21, 1999, the film was released on VHS and DVD by Columbia TriStar Home Video. (Note: Renamed Columbia TriStar Home Entertainment in April 2001, then Sony Pictures Home Entertainment between November 2004 and March 2005.) In 2007, the film was re-released on DVD as part of a double feature with Thomas and the Magic Railroad.

== Reception ==
=== Box office ===
The Adventures of Elmo in Grouchland was the only family film playing in most theaters at the time of its release. Sony had planned a scaled-back release, making it challenging to recoup its costs. The film opened at No. 8 with a weekend gross of $3,255,033 from 1,210 theaters, averaging $2,690 per venue. In total, The Adventures of Elmo in Grouchland earned back less than half its $26 million budget, grossing $11,683,047 during its two-and-a-half-month theatrical run, making it a box office bomb. It is currently the lowest-grossing Muppet film to date.

=== Critical response ===
The Adventures of Elmo in Grouchland has a 77% rating on Rotten Tomatoes, based on 44 reviews, with an average rating of 6.70/10. The site's consensus states, "This fun and moral tale entertains both first-time Sesame Street watchers and seasoned veterans." On Metacritic, which uses a weighted average, the film has a score of 59 out of 100 based on 22 critics, indicating "mixed or average" reviews.

Joe Leydon of Variety gave an average review, stating that the movie's script has "somehow manages to make the pic seem at once frenetic and soporific." He notes that Patinkin's performance is "zestfully hammy — but, of course, not very frightening," and Vanessa Williams calls her "while warbling one of the pic's many aggressively cheery and instantly forgettable songs." He also noted that the movie is called "an audience-participation pic." Anita Gates of The New York Times wrote a review of the film, saying that the movie's plot is "somewhat complicated, [which] may disappoint or confuse some tiny Elmo fans." She also says that the lessons about "cooperation, perseverance and transformation, including but not restricted to growing up" are "well handled," and the interruptions of Bert and Ernie are told "periodically to explain, reiterate and reassure", which is a "good thing." Nell Minow of Common Sense Media gave it a full five stars, lauding the characteristic, humor, kindness, puns for parents, "delightful silliness for kids," and lessons about "cooperation, loyalty, sharing, and believing in yourself for everyone." She also says that, in conclusion, Patinkin and Vanessa Williams "provide some star power, but the real stars are the Muppets and the audience -- who are invited to participate in the movie at crucial moments." William Thomas of Empire rated the film three stars out of five, saying that "Without the Muppet movies' production values, this big screen adventure for Sesame Street's finest is an enjoyable exercise in colourful simplicity."
