= Carmen Osbahr =

Mexican-American puppeteer

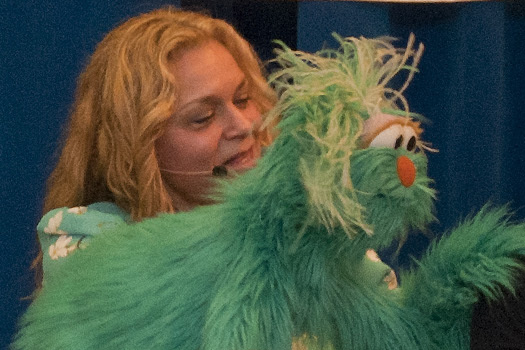
- Osbahr performing as Rosita in 2012
- Occupations: Puppeteer, actress
- Years active: 1981–present

Carmen Osbahr is a Mexican-American puppeteer and actress. She has performed Rosita on Sesame Street since 1991, and also performed Kiki Flores on The Puzzle Place and Lily on Johnny and the Sprites.

== Career ==
In 1981, she was hired to work on a Mexican co-production game show, titled Xe-Tu. One of Jim Henson's crew workers eventually saw her work, and asked her in 1988 if she wanted to join the cast of Sesame Street. In 1991, she began performing Rosita in Season 23.

== Filmography ==
=== Film ===
Year	Title	Role	Notes
1993	Billy Bunny's Animal Songs	Gopher	Direct-to-video film
1999	The Adventures of Elmo in Grouchland	Rosita	

=== Television ===
Year	Title	Role	Notes
1989–present	Sesame Street	Rosita, Additional Muppets	
1990	The Muppets Celebrate Jim Henson	Additional Muppets	CBS television special
1995–1998	The Puzzle Place	Kiki Flores, Orange Piece Police	
1998–1999	Bear in the Big Blue House	Ursa	
2006	Between the Lions	Sierra Lion	
2007–2008	Johnny and the Sprites	Lily	
2008, 2009	30 Rock	Puppeteer	2 episodes
2020	The Not-Too-Late Show with Elmo	Rosita	

== Awards and nominations ==
Year	Award	Category	Work	Result	Refs
2025	Children's and Family Emmy Awards	Outstanding Puppeteer Performance	Sesame Street	Nominated	
