= Abby Cadabby =

Sesame Street Muppet character

- Sesame Street character
- First appearance: "Abby Cadabby Comes to Sesame Street'' (2006)
- Created by: Tony Geiss; Ed Christie; Rollie Krewson
- Performed by: Leslie Carrara-Rudolph

In-universe information
- Full name: Abigail Cadabby
- Species: Muppet fairy
- Gender: Female
- Family: Maggie Cadabby (Mother); Freddy (Stepfather); Rudy (Stepbrother)
- Origin: Fairyland (Past); Sesame Street (Present)

Abby Cadabby is a Muppet character on the PBS children's television show Sesame Street, performed by Leslie Carrara-Rudolph. On August 14, 2006, Abby made her debut in the first episode of Sesame Street’s 37th season, when she moved into the neighborhood and met some of the Street's residents. On the day of her debut, her wand broke; Big Bird told her to take her wand to the Fix-It Shop where Maria would fix it. Season 40 features her CGI animated recurring segments titled Abby's Flying Fairy School which was adapted into a proper spin-off. She is also currently the host of another spin-off Abby's Amazing Adventures, with her stepbrother Rudy, which debuted in 2018.

Her name is a play on words of the magic word Abracadabra. Abby's magical powers are limited to popping in and out of thin air, floating when she's happy, and turning things into pumpkins. She has pink skin, hair, and freckles (which are gone and retrieved in episode 4199). Although familiar with the world of fairy tales, Abby is astounded by such basic learning skills as drawing letters or counting, prompting her catchphrase "That's so magic!" She frequently uses her wand cell phone to call her mother. When she's asked to return home, she says that she's "gotta poof". She can speak Dragonfly and Butterfly and is teaching Rosita these languages, while Rosita teaches her Spanish. Along with Baby Bear, Abby begins attending school in a 2006 episode at the Storybook Community School, where Mrs. Goose is the teacher and other fairy tale characters like Hansel and Gretel are her classmates. Her mother being the fairy godmother, went to that school and had the same teacher. In 2020 on Sesame Street in Communities, Abby was shown going to online Pre-School, but is obviously a different school as she has a different teacher and Elmo, who is her best friend, is now one of her classmates.

Tony Geiss conceptualized Abby as a way to simultaneously introduce a major female character to the show and add someone from a different culture, without "having consciously to introduce somebody from Indonesia or India". Abby's design is an intentional departure from the typical Muppet look because she's not originally from Sesame Street. The implication is that the fairies in her old neighborhood look like her.

Abby's likeness has been adapted for a 43-foot balloon which premiered in the 2007 Macy's Thanksgiving Day Parade, a full-body costume character for stage appearances and several merchandise items.

In 2008, Abby was added to the cast of Plaza Sésamo, the Mexican co-production of Sesame Street, appearing in new segments where she tries to perform magic tricks with various ordinary objects. She also has a segment with Lola where they solve everyday problems with simple science and sometimes art. In 2009, she became the host of 3, 2, 1 Vamos!, a Latin American pre-school programming block, which first aired in English in 2010, on Canadian television.

She is also one of the few Muppet characters to age, being age 3 from 2006 to 2018 and age 4 from 2018 to present.

== Character launch ==
Abby Cadabby was officially announced in TV Guide, months before the 37th season debut of Sesame Street, and a press kit was issued soon after.

She made her Sesame Street debut on August 14, 2006, the Season 37 premiere.

Abby was scheduled to be interviewed August 10, 2006, on The Today Show on NBC; "NBC Special Report" coverage of the 2006 transatlantic aircraft plot pre-empted the interview. Abby appeared for a short chat on August 14, a few short minutes with Ann Curry and Lester Holt before the weather. The scheduled "satellite-tour" of local stations across America went on later that day.

Abby was to be featured as ABC World News "Person of the Week" on August 11, 2006; Hurricane Katrina/2006 Israel-Lebanon conflict dog rescuer Linda Nealon pre-empted her. Abby Cadabby was featured on the 18 August broadcast, with the teaser, "Femininity comes to Sesame Street". She was touted as the first 3-year-old "Person of The Week".

Abby appeared on the August 11 edition of All Things Considered on NPR.

In 2007, Abby had a balloon made after her in the 2007 Macy's Thanksgiving Day Parade. In 2008, Abby starred as 'Alice' in the Sesame Street direct-to-DVD film Abby in Wonderland that adapts Lewis Carroll's Alice in Wonderland. Abby was featured in the 2007-2009 tour of Sesame Street Live show When Elmo Grows Up and the 2012-2013 leg of the "Elmo Makes Music" tour.

In 2014's direct-to-DVD film "Elmo's Super Numbers", Abby appears at NumberCon as "One-Da Woman", a numeric spoof and pun of the DC comic book female superhero, Wonder Woman.

In 2018 (Season 49) she got a wardrobe change. Her dress was replaced with a skirt with flower sparkles, a t-shirt with a flower, and hair clips shaped like daisies and ladybugs. This is a hint to her liking to take care of her fairy garden.

Abby is the host of Sesame Street's autism initiative.

== Animation team ==
The animation studio SpeakEasy FX, founded by director Scott Stewart, produces the "Abby's Flying Fairy School" series.
