= Elmo's Christmas Countdown =

- Written by: Joey Mazzarino
- Directed by: Gary Halverson
- Starring: Kevin Clash; Sheryl Crow; Jamie Foxx; Charles Gibson; Anne Hathaway; Jennifer Hudson; Kevin James; Alicia Keys; Brad Paisley; Ty Pennington; Steve Schirripa; Tony Sirico; Ben Stiller
- Country of origin: United States
- Original language: English

Production
- Editor: John R. Tiereny
- Running time: 60 minutes
- Production company: Sesame Workshop

Original release
- Network: ABC
- Release: December 23, 2007

Elmo's Christmas Countdown is a 2007 television Christmas special, featuring the characters from Sesame Street. It was first aired on December 23, 2007, on ABC and starred Ben Stiller.

== Plot synopsis ==
In Elmo's Christmas Countdown, Stiller the Elf (Ben Stiller) is telling Stan the snowball how Christmas was almost ruined. He recounts how he visited Sesame Street because he believed Oscar the Grouch would start the official countdown to Christmas. However, due to his hatred of the Christmas season, Oscar tosses the magical counting blocks into the air and they disappear. Stiller is worried that he destroyed Christmas, and it is up to Elmo and Abby Cadabby to help him find the blocks and the true meaning of Christmas miracles. All of Elmo's friends find the blocks one by one:

- Block No. 10 features Jennifer Hudson singing "Carol of the Bells" with the Forest Animals (including Hoots the Owl). It is found by Abby Cadabby.
- Block No. 9 has the reindeer News presenter Charles Blitzen (a spoof of Charles Gibson) of CDN (short for Counter Downer Network) reporting on the incident caused by Stiller the Elf. It was found in Bert's Christmas oatmeal.
- Block No. 8 has Anne Hathaway singing "I Want a Snuffleupagus for Christmas" (a parody of "I Want a Hippopotamus for Christmas") with Big Bird and Mr. Snuffleupagus. It was found in Super Grover's cape.
- Block No. 7 has Tony Sirico and Steven Schirripa failing to star in a Christmas Special as Bert and Ernie, Christmas is finally saved. It was found by Big Bird.
- Block No. 5 is found by Ernie instead of Block No. 6, which makes Stiller anxious. While Abby takes Stiller for some water,. Elmo sings "Do You Hear What I Hear" with Alicia Keys.
- Block No. 6 has Charles Blitzen reporting that mass-hysteria is happening after news of the incident caused by Stiller the Elf was happening. It was found by Alicia Keys.
- Block No. 5 has Jamie Foxx singing the "Nutcracker Suite" with a Nutcracker version of Elmo. It was found by Ernie.
- Block No. 4 has Charles Blitzen sticking out his tongue to Stiller the Elf. It was found by Papa Bear.
- Block No. 3 has Count von Count singing "I Saw Three Ships" with Ty Pennington during an "Extreme Makeover: Christmas Edition" where more ships are being made for the song. It was found by Mama Bear.
- Block No. 2 has Brad Paisley singing "Jingle Bells" with Grover and the Penguins. It was found by Baby Bear.
- Block No. 1 was found by Stiller the Elf. Unfortunately, it had a cookie in it and the Christmas Counter Downer is devoured by Cookie Monster.

Stiller the Elf states that Christmas will never come as Oscar celebrates. Elmo states that he and Abby can believe in Christmas miracles as Stiller joins them. Their believing attracts the appearance of Santa Claus (Kevin James). Santa Claus then sings "Believe" with Elmo, Abby, Stiller, Big Bird, Snuffleupagus, Ernie and Bert, Count von Count, Grover, Prairie Dawn, Baby Bear, Telly Monster, Rosita, Zoe, and Cookie Monster. Santa Claus then takes his leave as he quotes "Merry Christmas to All and to All a Good Night". After the story is over, Stiller the Elf and Stan the Snowball wish everybody a Merry Christmas.

== Sesame Street's broadcast history ==
Elmo's Christmas Countdown marks the ninth time the Sesame Street characters have crossed over into commercial television. All other Sesame Street material had aired on PBS, a public television network. 25th and 30th anniversary specials, as well as Elmopalooza, have also aired on ABC, while NBC aired an introductory show to Sesame Street called This Way To Sesame Street, Big Bird in China, and a 20th anniversary special. CBS aired the independently produced A Special Sesame Street Christmas, and Fox aired the special CinderElmo.

== Cast ==
- Ben Stiller as Stiller the Elf (voice)
- Anne Hathaway as herself
- Ty Pennington as himself
- Jamie Foxx as himself
- Alicia Keys as herself
- Sheryl Crow as herself
- Charles Gibson as Charles Blitzen (voice)
- Steve Schirripa as Famous Ernie
- Tony Sirico as Famous Bert
- Jennifer Hudson as herself
- Brad Paisley as himself
- Kevin James as Santa Claus

=== Muppet performers ===
- Kevin Clash as Elmo, Mouse King
- Jennifer Barnhart as Mama Bear
- Fran Brill as Prairie Dawn
- Leslie Carrara-Rudolph as Abby Cadabby
- Eric Jacobson as Bert, Grover
- Joey Mazzarino as Papa Bear, Stan the Snowball
- Jerry Nelson as Count von Count
- Martin P. Robinson as Mr. Snuffleupagus
- David Rudman as Cookie Monster, Baby Bear
- Caroll Spinney as Big Bird, Oscar the Grouch
- Matt Vogel as Stiller the Elf, Big Bird (puppeteer)
- Steve Whitmire as Ernie
- Bryant Young as the rear end of Mr. Snuffleupagus

Additional Muppets performed by Pam Arciero, Heather Asch, Tyler Bunch, Stephanie D'Abruzzo, Ryan Dillon, Artie Esposito, James Godwin, BJ Guyer, Andy Hayward, Carmen Osbahr, Patrick Holmes, John Kennedy, Peter Linz, Michael Lisa, Noel MacNeal, Amanda Maddock, Ed May, Paul McGinnis, Tracie Mick, Marc Petrosino, Andy Stone, Ian Sweetman, David Stephens, John Tartaglia, and Gabriel Velez.

== See also ==
- List of Christmas films
