= Elmo Saves Christmas =

- Genre: Christmas special
- Written by: Christine Ferraro; Tony Geiss
- Directed by: Emily Squires
- Starring: Maya Angelou; Charles Durning; Harvey Fierstein; 14 Karat Soul; Bob McGrath; Roscoe Orman; Sonia Manzano; Emilio Delgado; David Smyrl; Carlo Alban; Alison Bartlett-O'Reilly; Desiree Casado
- Voices of: Kevin Clash; Joey Mazzarino; Fran Brill; Caroll Spinney; Steve Whitmire; Frank Oz; Jerry Nelson; Carmen Osbahr; Martin P. Robinson; David Rudman; Bryant Young; Pam Arciero; Peter Linz; Noel MacNeal; Jim Martin; John Tartaglia; Alice Dinnean; Matt Vogel
- Narrated by: Maya Angelou
- Opening theme: It's Christmas Again
- Ending theme: Keep Christmas with You (All Through the Year)
- Country of origin: United States
- Original language: English

Production
- Executive producer: Nancy Kanter
- Running time: 60 minutes
- Production company: Children's Television Workshop

Original release
- Network: PBS
- Release: December 2, 1996

Elmo Saves Christmas is a Sesame Street Christmas musical fantasy comedy drama television special which was released on PBS on December 2, 1996. It was released to VHS that same year. Inspired by the 1892 short story "Christmas Every Day" by William Dean Howells, Elmo wishes for Christmas to occur every day, only to be taken to the future to learn the adverse consequences of his wish. The program was filmed in Sesame Street's usual home, the Kaufman Astoria Studios in New York City. Footage from the film It's a Wonderful Life also appears in the program and after the credits.

== Plot ==
Elmo stays up on Christmas Eve to meet Santa Claus. He falls asleep, but is awakened by Santa stuck in the chimney. Elmo pulls him out, and Santa thanks him by offering either a teddy bear or a magical snow globe as a gift. Elmo chooses the globe and is granted three wishes, wasting the first on a glass of water.

On Christmas Day, Elmo wishes for Christmas to be every day, but Santa warns him that Christmas would no longer be special. Lightning, a reindeer-in-training, takes Elmo to the future to see the effects of his wish. Big Bird is sad that Snuffy does not return from visiting his grandmother in Cincinnati, the businesses remain closed, It's a Wonderful Life plays continuously on every TV channel, Santa's overworked elves make flawed toys, and other holidays are overshadowed. Meanwhile, Oscar the Grouch enjoys the increasing misery.

By next year's Christmas, everybody is tired of celebrating, Christmas trees are endangered, all the businesses are bankrupt, and Santa is retiring to Florida. Elmo uses his last wish to make Christmas be once a year again, but breaks his snow globe before the wish is granted. Fortunately, Lightning takes him back to the Christmas Eve when he rescued Santa, and Elmo chooses a plush "Moo-Bunny" as his new gift. Snuffy returns, telling Big Bird that his grandmother came to Sesame Street instead. Elmo learns that, although Christmas does not occur every day, everyone can keep their Christmas spirit alive in their hearts all year.

== Cast ==
- Maya Angelou as Herself/Narrator
- Charles Durning as Santa Claus
- Harvey Fierstein as the Easter Bunny
- 14 Karat Soul as Themselves

=== Humans ===
- Carlo Alban as Carlo
- Alison Bartlett-O'Reilly as Gina
- Emilio Delgado as Luis
- Desiree Casado as Gabi
- Sonia Manzano as Maria
- Bob McGrath as Bob
- Roscoe Orman as Gordon
- David Smyrl as Mr. Handford

=== Muppet performers ===
==== Characters from Sesame Street ====
- Frank Oz as Cookie Monster and Grover
- Jerry Nelson as Count von Count, Mr. Johnson and News Flash Announcer
- Kevin Clash as Elmo, Father and Elf 3
- Fran Brill as Zoe, Easter Egg customer and Elf 2
- Joey Mazzarino as Lightning and Elf 1
- Carmen Osbahr as Rosita
- Caroll Spinney as Big Bird and Oscar the Grouch
- Martin P. Robinson as Mr. Snuffleupagus, Telly Monster and Elf 5
- David Rudman as Baby Bear, Humphrey and Elf 4
- Pam Arciero as Easter Egg customer

==== Characters from The Muppet Show ====
- Steve Whitmire as Kermit the Frog

Additional Muppets performed by Peter Linz, Noel MacNeal, Jim Martin, John Tartaglia, Alice Dinnean and Matt Vogel.

== Songs ==
1. "It's Christmas Again"
2. "Every Day Can't Be Christmas"
3. "Give Your Friend an Easter Egg for Christmas"
4. "All I Want for Christmas is You"
5. "Every Day Can't Be Christmas" (reprise)
6. "Keep Christmas with You (All Through the Year)"

== See also ==
- List of Christmas films
