= Noel MacNeal =

American puppeteer

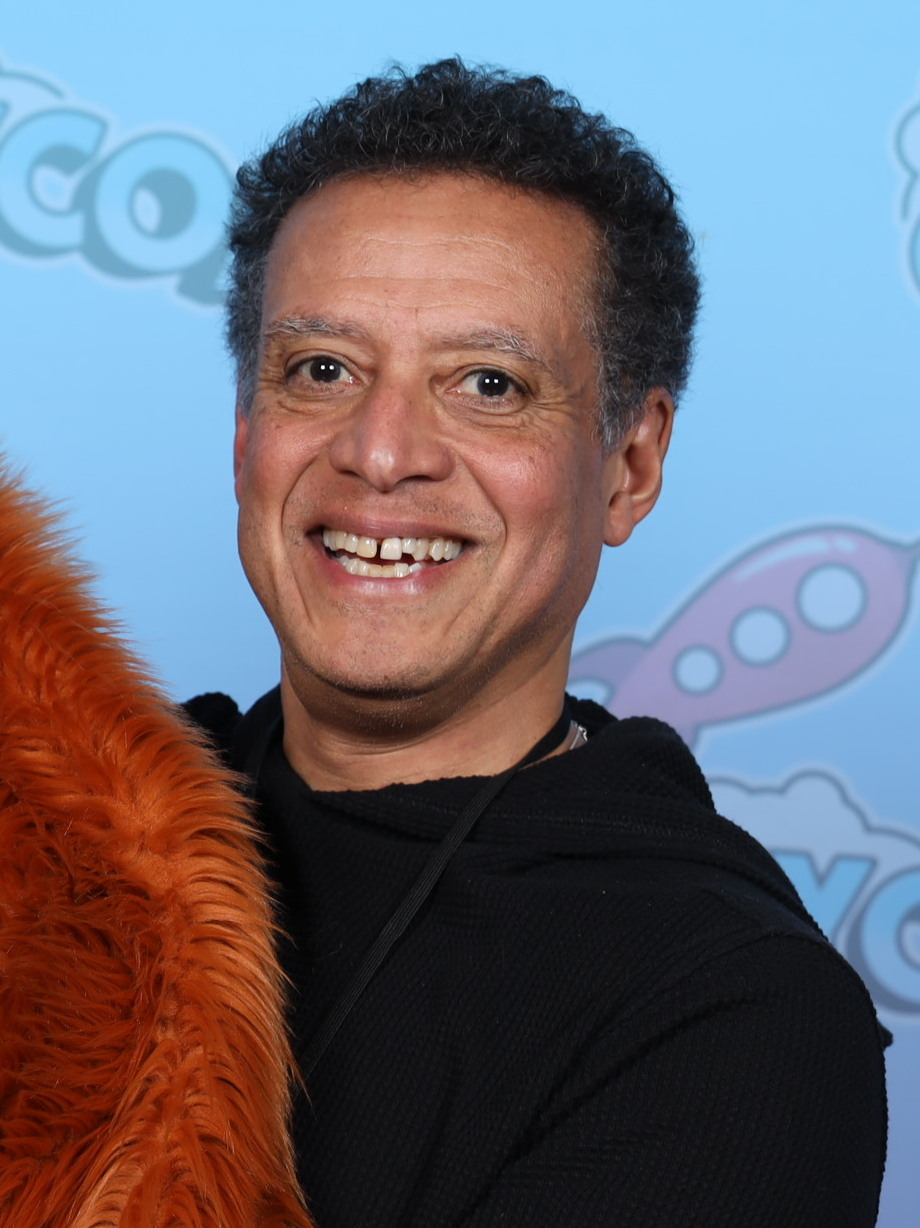
- MacNeal at GalaxyCon Columbus in 2023
- Occupations: Puppeteer; actor; director; writer
- Years active: 1983–present
- Spouse: Susan Elia (m. 1999)
- Children: 1

Noel MacNeal, sometimes credited as Edward Noel MacNeal, is an American puppeteer, actor, director and writer. He is best known as the performer of Bear on Bear in the Big Blue House. He also starred as Kako on Oobi, Leon MacNeal on The Puzzle Place and as Magellan on Eureeka's Castle. Since 2014, MacNeal has served as resident puppeteer for Last Week Tonight with John Oliver, portraying puppet characters such as Mr. Nutterbutter.

== Career ==
MacNeal began his career in puppetry in 1982 as a puppet wrangler on Sesame Street. In 1983, he succeeded John Lovelady as the performer of Knock-Knock the Woodpecker on The Great Space Coaster.

In 1997, MacNeal gained widespread recognition for his role as Bear in the Disney Channel preschool series Bear in the Big Blue House. In 2003, he received a Daytime Emmy Nomination for Outstanding Performer in a Children’s Series.

In addition to puppeteering, MacNeal has written for a variety of children's programs including Eureeka's Castle, and The Puzzle Place. MacNeal has also directed several programs, including episodes of Between the Lions. In 2023, he directed an episode for season 53 of Sesame Street.

Since 2014, MacNeal has served as resident puppeteer and performed various characters on Last Week Tonight with John Oliver.

In 2022, MacNeal became the vacation/swing puppeteer and vocalist of Audrey II in the Off-Broadway production of Little Shop of Horrors.

In March 2025, MacNeal made his solo Cabaret debut at 54 Below in an evening directed by Michael Kirk Lane, with musical direction by John Bronston and featuring Jennifer Barnhart and Fergie Phillipe

On November 6, 2025, MacNeal made his Broadway debut as a puppeteer and Ensemble member of the limited time show, Rob Lake Magic with Special Guests The Muppets.

== Personal life ==
On November 6, 1999, he married author Susan Elia at Manhattan's Union Theological Seminary. In 2005, their son was born.

== Filmography ==
=== Film ===
Year	Title	Role	Notes
1985	Follow That Bird	Madame Chairbird	Performer
1993	Teenage Mutant Ninja Turtles III	Raphael	Facial assistant
2008	A Muppets Christmas: Letters to Santa	Sweetums	Performer; television film
2009	Old Dogs		Puppeteer

=== Television ===
Year	Title	Role	Notes
1983–1986	The Great Space Coaster	Knock-Knock	Performer
1983–present	Sesame Street	Mommy Snuffleupagus, Gretel, Additional Muppets	Performer
1985	Little Muppet Monsters	Rat, Cow, Magic Book	Performer
1989–1995	Eureeka's Castle	Magellan, Webster	Performer, writer
1990	The Cosby Show	Cheese	Puppeteer; Episode: "Cliff's Nightmare"
1991	Dinosaurs	Additional characters	Puppeteer
1992	Dog City	Officer Fuzzy, Doctor	Performer
1993	CityKids	Koozebanians	Performer
1995–1996	The Puzzle Place	Leon MacNeal, Blue Piece Police	Performer, writer
1997–2006	Bear in the Big Blue House	Bear, Moss, Billy	Performer, writer, director (one episode)
1997	Salty's Lighthouse		Writer
1998	Gullah Gullah Island		Writer; Episode: "Magic Show"
1999	Cosby		Puppeteer; Episode: "My Spy"
2000–2005	Oobi	Kako	Performer
2006	Breakfast with Bear	Bear	Performer, writer
2001–2003	The Book of Pooh	Rabbit	Performer
2004	Chappelle's Show		Puppeteer; Episode: "Knee High Park"
2004	Lazytown	Pixel	Voice; Episode: "Defeeted"
2006–2007	Blue's Room	Blue	Puppeteer (season 2)
2006	The Good Night Show	Leo	Host (26 episodes)
2009–2010	Between the Lions	Lionel Lion (seasons 9-10), Monkey, Squeaky the Wheel	Performer
2014–2026	Last Week Tonight with John Oliver		Puppeteer
2015	Unbreakable Kimmy Schmidt		Puppeteer; Episode: "Kimmy's in a Love Triangle!"
2017	Julie's Greenroom	Additional characters	Performer
2022	Pause with Sam Jay		Puppeteer; Episode: "Dead Momma Episode"

Preceded by Martin P. Robinson	Performer of Daddy Snuffleupagus; 1992	Succeeded by None
Preceded by David Rudman	Performer of Mommy Snuffleupagus; 1993–2000	Succeeded by Alice Dinnean
Preceded by Leslie Carrara-Rudolph	Performer of Blue; 2006–2007	Succeeded by None
Preceded by John Henson	Performer of Sweetums; 2008, 2017	Succeeded by Matt Vogel
Preceded by Anthony Asbury	Performer of Lionel Lion; 2009–2010	Succeeded by None
Preceded by Melanie Martinez	Host of The Good Night Show; 2006	Succeeded by Michele Lepe
