= Big Bird in China =

1983 television film directed by Jon Stone

- Big Bird in China video cassette cover
- Genre: Family; Comedy
- Created by: Jon Stone
- Written by: Joseph A. Bailey; Jon Stone; Caroll Spinney
- Story by: Caroll Spinney (uncredited)
- Directed by: Jon Stone
- Starring: Caroll Spinney
- Music by: Dick Lieb
- Countries of origin: United States; China
- Original language: English

Production
- Producers: Kuo Bao-Xiang; Xu Ja-Cha; David Liu
- Cinematography: Frank V. Phillips (director of photography) (uncredited)
- Editor: Ken Gutstein
- Running time: 75 minutes
- Production company: Children's Television Workshop

Original release
- Network: NBC; China Central Television
- Release: May 29, 1983

Big Bird in China is a 1983 television special based on the children's television series Sesame Street produced by Children's Television Workshop and China Central Television. It was originally broadcast on May 29, 1983, on NBC. Big Bird, Barkley and Little Xiao Fu travel through China to find Feng Huang, the Phoenix bird.

The production was released on VHS from Random House Home Video in 1987, and on VHS and DVD from Sony Wonder on February 10, 2004. Although the voice of Telly Monster was Brian Muehl, Martin P. Robinson re-dubbed Telly's lines for the 2004 VHS and DVD releases when Big Bird goes to China. Also, it lacks about a minute of the original production, in which Big Bird is looking for someone who speaks "American", though it can be seen on early VHS releases.

This television special had a sequel known as Big Bird in Japan.

== Synopsis ==
The special begins in New York City's Chinatown, Manhattan, where Big Bird peeks at an old scroll with a picture of a beautiful phoenix on it. The shopkeeper explains that the phoenix is magical and lives in China. To find the phoenix, Big Bird will first have to find the four places pictured on the scroll and he exclaims, "Well, what a good thing it would be if a great big American bird went to meet that beautiful Chinese bird! I mean, she could tell me everything about China, and then I could come home and tell everybody here!" He sets out with Barkley on a boat and makes it to China.

Highlights include Chinese landmarks like the Great Wall of China and Beijing, Big Bird learning the "little duckling dance", and a song to teach Chinese words. A character called the Monkey King helps Big Bird and Xiao Fu on their quest. Meanwhile, Oscar the Grouch decides to try to dig his way to China from his trash can with Telly accompanying him, but when they get to China, Oscar finds it boring and goes straight home, much to Telly's disappointment.

As the credits roll, Big Bird and Barkley go back in Chinatown, Manhattan, and there is one last chuckle from Xiao Fu.

== Origins ==
In his memoir, Caroll Spinney (the puppeteer who plays Big Bird and Oscar the Grouch) notes that he was inspired to pitch the special to Children's Television Workshop after visiting China on a tour with Bob Hope. This first trip was to film the Bob Hope on the Road to China, a two-hour NBC special airing September 16, 1979. The special featured Big Bird, along with the likes of Shields and Yarnell and Mikhail Baryshnikov, with musical numbers by Peaches & Herb and Crystal Gayle. It was produced by James Lipton.

Spinney devised the storyline and suggested locations for Big Bird in China. However, the program's credits do not acknowledge this and instead state, "Created by Jon Stone". Spinney also notes that, when filming on location in Beijing, Guilin, and Suzhou, he experienced much tension and difficulty due to animosity from Stone.

== Cast ==
- Caroll Spinney as Big Bird and Oscar the Grouch
- Frank Oz as Bert, Cookie Monster and Grover
- Jerry Nelson as Two-Headed Monster #1, Oscar the Grouch (assistant) and Cookie Monster (assistant)
- Brian Muehl as Barkley and Telly (Original 1983 Version)
- Jim Henson as Ernie
- Richard Hunt as Two-Headed Monster #2, Ernie (assistant) and Telly (assistant)
- Martin P. Robinson as Telly (2004 Version)
- Cheryl Blalock as Additional Muppet Performer
- Ed Christie as Additional Muppet Performer
- Ouyang Lianzi (Lisa Ouyang) as Xiao Fu
- Katherine Lakoski as the Singing Phoenix
- Lu Ja-Lin as the Dancing Phoenix
- Arabella Hong as the Shopkeeper
- Ting Bao-Yi and Wang Kwan-Wei as the Lion Dogs
- Hua Ziu Ping as the Storyteller
- Chou Yi-Ping, Liu Xio-Shen, Zhang Xin-Tien, Xu Tien-Ed, Quan She-Zhen, Li Jiang, Lu Fu-Hai and Wu Chi-Lian as the Monkey Kings (Sun Wukong)

== Awards ==
- Won the 1983 Emmy for Outstanding Children's Program.

== Production ==
Lisa Ou, who played Xiao Foo, did not understand a single word of English when she acted her scenes. She memorized the sounds.

Film production took place in 3 cities: Beijing (the Great Wall, animal sculpture), Guilin (the Glass Chessboard, headless buffalo) and Suzhou (the storyteller).

Scenes at the Great Wall took place early morning around 4AM due to heavy tourism crowds.

Carroll mentioned in the 2013 documentary "Being Big Bird" that Lisa Ou learned all her lines one by one while filming. He would repeat the lines and she would repeating stating "she probably didn't know what she was saying but she was very smart." Carroll and Lisa Ou were also re-united for the documentary for the first time in about 30 years.

This is the only film Lisa Ou acted in.
