= Brian Meehl =

American puppeteer

- Born: Brian Giuseppe Meehl; Canandaigua, New York, U.S.
- Other name: Brian Muehl
- Occupations: Puppeteer, writer
- Years active: 1978–present
- Spouse: Cindy Meehl

Brian Giuseppe Meehl (also known as Brian Muehl), is an American puppeteer and writer. He worked on Sesame Street and The Muppet Show. He has written several novels for young adults, including Out of Patience and Suck It Up.

== Biography ==
Meehl worked on the last six shows of The Muppet Show. He then worked on Sesame Street, performing Barkley, Grundgetta, Telly Monster, and an early version of Elmo, among other characters. His work with Henson also included roles in the films, The Dark Crystal, The Muppets Take Manhattan and The Great Muppet Caper.

In 1984, Meehl left the Muppets and began writing for children's television series including Between the Lions, Codename: Kids Next Door, Cyberchase, the TUGS segments for Salty's Lighthouse, Eureeka's Castle, and The Magic School Bus, with the only exception being the general-interest nature and science documentary series Eyewitness for the BBC and DK Vision, where he also served as script supervisor for a number of episodes in the first season before leaving the series entirely during the second season.

Meehl has written seven young adult novels: Out of Patience (2008), Suck It Up (2009), You Don't Know About Me (2011), and Suck It Up and Die (2012). He released an eBook and paperback adult novel, Pastime, in 2012. More recently, Meehl has completed his Blowback Trilogy: Blowback '07, (2016), Blowback '63 (2017), and Blowback '94 (2020) about time-traveling teenage twins who fall back into little known but pivotal events in history.

== Filmography ==
=== Television ===
- The Muppet Show – Additional Muppets
- Sesame Street – Barkley (1978–1984, 1988), Clementine (1979–1984), Dr. Nobel Price (1979–1984), Elmo (1980–1984), Grundgetta (1980–1984), Othmar the Grouch, Pearl, Rusty, Telly Monster (1979–1984; 1993–present), Additional Muppets
- Eureeka's Castle – Bogge and Mr. Knack
- Dog City – Bruno
- The Wubbulous World of Dr. Seuss – Binkham Tamino McDoyal the Third (in "Norval the Great")

=== Film ===
- Big Bird in China – Barkley, Telly Monster
- The Dark Crystal – SkekEkt/The Ornamentalist, UrSu/The Dying Master, UrZah/The Ritual Guardian (puppetry only)
- The Great Muppet Caper – Additional Muppets
- The Muppets Take Manhattan – Tatooey Rat, Clementine, Additional Muppets
- The Song of the Cloud Forest – Additional Muppets
- Big Bird in Japan – Barkley

Preceded by None	Performer of Grundgetta; 1980 – 1984	Succeeded by Pam Arciero
Preceded by Bob Payne	Performer of Telly Monster; 1979 – 1984	Succeeded by Martin P. Robinson
Preceded by Various	Performer of Elmo; 1981 – 1984	Succeeded by Richard Hunt
Preceded by None	Performer of Clementine; 1979 – 1984	Succeeded by Kevin Clash
Preceded by None	Performer of Dr. Nobel Price; 1979 – 1984	Succeeded by Kevin Clash
Preceded by Toby Towson	Performer of Barkley; 1979 – 1984, 1988	Succeeded by Fred "Garbo" Garver
