= Peter Piekos =

Dutch voice actor

Peter Piekos (pseudonym of Pieter Koster) (13 January 1918, Amsterdam - 2000) was a Dutch voice actor.

== Career ==
Piekos was the original voice actor for Cookie Monster (and Herry Monster) for Sesamstraat, the Dutch co-production of Sesame Street. He occasionally performed the voices of Herbert Birdsfoot and Sherlock Hemlock, as well as a lot of the narrators: his regular voice sounds like an old fashioned radio announcer.

During the late 1980s, Hero Muller took over both monsters. Peter was living in Italy at the time, and was unlocatable by producers.

Unlike the original English-speaking Cookie Monster, the Dutch "Koekiemonster" uses correct grammar.
