= Dog City =

American-Canadian animated series

- Also known as: Jim Henson's Dog City
- Genre: Detective fiction; Police comedy
- Created by: Jim Henson (original made for TV film)
- Developed by: Peter Sauder; J.D. Smith
- Directed by: John van Bruggen
- Starring: Muppet performers: Fran Brill; Lisa Buckley; Kevin Clash; Joey Mazzarino; Brian Muehl; David Rudman
- Voices of: Ron White; Elizabeth Hanna; Stuart Stone; John Stocker; Stephen Ouimette; Paulina Gillis
- Countries of origin: United States; Canada
- Original language: English
- No. of seasons: 3
- No. of episodes: 31

Production
- Executive producers: Jim Henson Productions: Michael K. Frith; Brian Henson; Nelvana Limited: Patrick Loubert; Michael Hirsh; Clive A. Smith
- Production companies: Nelvana Limited; Jim Henson Productions

Original release
- Network: Fox Kids (United States); Channel 4 (United Kingdom); Canal+ (France); Canal+ (Spain); Global Television Network (Canada)
- Release: September 26, 1992 – November 26, 1994

Dog City is an animated television series that was produced by Nelvana Limited in association with Jim Henson Productions, Channel 4, Canal+, autonomous Spanish channels and the Global Television Network. The series ran for three seasons, airing on Fox Kids from September 26, 1992, to November 26, 1994. The series contained both animation produced by Nelvana, and puppetry by Jim Henson Productions - similar to Little Muppet Monsters - and invoked a mixture of detective fiction with police comedy.

The series starred Kevin Clash as Eliot Shag, a German Shepherd animator, and the voice talents of Ron White as Ace Hart, a cartoon German Shepherd private detective who Eliot animates. Each episode of Dog City focus on the exploits of Ace as he tackles various crimes around the titular Dog City, based on the stories Eliot devises from events that happen in real-life that inspire him, with the pair often interacting with each other during work to animate an episode of Ace's cartoon series.

Dog City was spawned following an hour-long live-action television film, titled Dog City: The Movie, which was created for an episode of The Jim Henson Hour in 1989, with the Muppet cast created for the film incorporated into the series.

== Television film ==
Dog City was originally an hour-long, broadcast on May 5, 1989, as an episode of The Jim Henson Hour, featuring the characters as puppets. In Dog City: The Movie, Ace Yu inherits a bar-restaurant called the Dog House following the death of his Uncle Harry and is harassed for protection money by crime syndicate boss Bugsy Them (who was responsible for the death of Uncle Harry). As it turns out, Harry was actually Ace's father. Refusing to pay or fight him, Bugsy kidnaps Ace's love interest Colleen. There are car chases and shoot-em-ups and rubber duckies involved in the action. In the end, Ace defeats Bugsy and ends up with Colleen.

=== Characters ===
- Ace Yu (performed by Kevin Clash) - A German Shepherd adopted by Chinese Pekingese parents.
- Colleen Barker (performed by Fran Brill) - A Rough Collie who serves as Ace's love interest.
- Bugsy Them (performed by Jim Henson) - A vain bulldog crime boss who is proud of his tail.
  - Miss Belle (performed by Camille Bonora) - A poodle that is the key associate and the wife of Bugsy Them.
  - Mad Dog (performed by Steve Whitmire) - Bugsy Them's dimwitted St. Bernard henchman.
  - Scruffy (performed by Gord Robertson) - Bugsy Them's henchman who is always scratching at his fleas.
  - Laughing Boy (performed by Rickey Boyd) - Bugsy Them's henchman who is always laughing and cracking jokes.
- Bubba (performed by Jerry Nelson) - The bartender at the Dog House.
- Mac (performed by Steve Whitmire) - The waiter at the Dog House.
- Quackers (performed by Rob Mills) - Ace Yu's sailor duck doll.
- Rowlf the Dog (performed by Jim Henson) - The piano-playing dog from The Muppet Show who is the narrator of Dog City: The Movie.

Dog City: The Movie (sans the framing sequences) was released to regions 1 and 2.

The Jim Henson Company's YouTube channel has clips from the film, in addition to the trailer and a behind the scenes clip from a mockumentary included in a playlist called "Dogs!".

== Premise ==
Dog City focuses on the lives of various anthropomorphic dogs and cats that reside in two different worlds - a live-action world portrayed by puppets and an animated world. The stories themselves focus on animator Eliot Shag and his cartoon creation (and practical alter ego) canine private investigator Ace Hart, both of whom are German Shepards. Each episode focuses on Eliot creating new animated stories featuring Ace for a television program named after the character with Ace playing out the stories that Eliot devises from inspiration he has from real-life events in his apartment building within his cartoon series' setting of Dog City. Both Eliot and Ace maintain a brotherly relationship as the latter knows he is a cartoon character and often breaks the fourth wall to speak with Eliot in regards to various issues he encounters during the animating of episodes, often when something he is doing or the story itself doesn't feel right to him.

During the live-action sequences, Eliot faces different problems relating to his work life and his personal life, including contending with his building's grouchy bulldog superintendent Bruno. As a recurring gag, many of the characters made for Eliot's cartoon series are based on the residents of the building that he knows of and interacts with - Bruno himself being the inspiration for the character of Bugsy Vile, a notorious crime boss whom Ace regularly has to deal with in many of the plots Eliot devises, alongside Artie, Eliot's young friend and animator assistant, being the idea behind Ace's own sidekick Eddie, a young newspaper boy.

During the first series, Eliot has feelings for his close neighbor Coleen, the inspiration for Ace's own love interest Rosie, chief of police for Dog City. The later series replaced Eliot's love interest with Artie's mother Terri. In some episodes, Eliot also spends time animating additional side stories alongside the main stories that Ace stars in.

== Characters ==
=== Animated characters ===
- Ace Hart (voiced by Ron White) - A German Shepherd who is a private eye detective.
- Rosie O'Gravy (voiced by Elizabeth Hanna) - A beautiful Rough Collie who is the chief of detectives and Ace's love interest.
- Eddie (voiced by Stuart Stone) - An English Springer Spaniel news-pup who often tags along on Ace Hart's cases.
- Bugsy Vile (voiced by John Stocker) - A bulldog who is a crime boss. As the "Dogfather of Crime", he is the archenemy of Ace Hart.
  - Frisky (voiced by James Rankin) - A chihuahua who is Bugsy Vile's excitable henchman.
  - Mad Dog (voiced by Stephen Ouimette) - Bugsy Vile's psychotic mongrel henchman.
  - Bruiser (voiced by Howard Jerome) - Bruiser is a bulldog who is Bugsy Vile's tough nephew and henchman.
  - Kitty (voiced by Paulina Gillis) - A female cat who serves as Bugsy's gun moll. She owns The Kitty Cat Club which is often used as a hideout and front for Bugsy Vile's group.
- Baron Von Rottweiler (voiced by Dan Hennessey) - A villainous German Rottweiler who is the secondary enemy of Ace Hart.
  - Leon Burger - A dachshund who serves as valet and henchman to Baron Von Rottweiler. He doesn't talk for some reason.
- Mayor Kickbark (voiced by Stephen Ouimette) - The Mayor of Dog City. He is always undermining Rosie O'Gravy.
  - Spunky the Flunky (voiced by John Stocker) - Mayor Kickbark's aide.
- Dot (voiced by Tara Charendoff) - Rosie O'Gravy's cute and lovely niece. She often appears with Rosie in "The Adventures of Rosie and Dot" segments. Her only dialogue was "Why".
- Steven (voiced by George Buza) - Steven was a canine watchman who was often seen in the animated segment with Yves.
- Yves (voiced by Rino Romano) - A cat burglar who debuted in the third season. He would try to steal something only to get thwarted comically by Steven.
- Sam Spayed - An old police dog who served as a teacher and father figure to the young Ace Hart. His name is a pun on the Dashiell Hammett character Sam Spade.
- Surelick Bones - An English bloodhound detective who was a rival to Ace until he was exposed as an art thief. Before Eliot worked on the cartoon about this Surelick Bones, Artie was a fan of the different stories about him. His name is a spoof of Sherlock Holmes.
- Woof Pack - A team of superhero dogs. The group was featured in comic vignettes, approaching mundane tasks like grocery shopping from a superheroic perspective.
  - Watch Dog (voiced by Don Francks) - Watchdog is a superhero who is a parody of Batman where his name is a take on Alan Moore's graphic novel Watchmen. Watch Dog carries hourglasses which act as gas canisters, and constantly uses time and clock related gadgets and metaphors. In "Who Watches the Watch Dog," Watch Dog's creator Fob Canine (a caricature of Bob Kane) posed as Watch Dog where he has his fellow comic book artist pose as the Labrador Gang in order to get Watch Dog to be popular again. Watch Dog is also the leader of the superhero group called the Woof Pack when the "Woof Pack" segments debuted in Season 3.
  - Plastic Lassie - A collie with the power of elasticity and member of the Woof Pack.
  - Pectoral Pooch - A dog with super-strength and member of the Woof Pack.
  - Hear Boy (voiced by Len Carlson) - A sound-sensitive superhero and member of the Woof Pack.
  - Wonder Whelp - The smallest, and youngest member of the Woof Pack.

=== Live-action characters ===
- Eliot Shag (performed by Kevin Clash) - A German Shepherd who is the animator of Ace Hart's adventures. He often communicates with Ace Hart and would be interrupted by his girlfriend or Bruno. In "Who Watches the Watch Dog," it is revealed that Elliot is a fan of a superhero called the Hooded Hound. Seeing as Eliot is a Live-Hand Muppet, Kevin Clash is assisted in operating Eliot by Don Reardon who operates Eliot's right hand. Clash also voices Eliot's animated form in the episodes "In Your Dreams" and "The Dog Days of Summer Vacation".
- Artie Springer (performed by Joey Mazzarino) - An English Springer Spaniel, Artie Springer is Eliot's young friend and son of Terri Springer. His favorite squeaky toy, a yellow rabbit called Mr Mookie, eventually starred in its own cartoon. Artie's puppet was previously seen as a background character in the original special. He served as the inspiration for Eddie.
- Colleen Barker (performed by Fran Brill) - A Rough Collie who is Eliot's neighbor and girlfriend. She is said to have moved away from the apartment when the character was dropped by Season Two. She was the first inspiration for Rosie O'Gravy.
- Terri Springer (performed by Fran Brill) - Terri Springer is an English Springer Spaniel who debuts in Season Two. She is Eliot's neighbor, Artie's mother, and a beautiful businesswoman. She served as the new inspiration for Rosie O'Gravy.
- Bruno (performed by Brian Muehl) - Bruno is a bulldog who is the surly building superintendent of the apartment that Eliot lives in and has a tendency to hassle Elliot. He served as the inspiration for Bugsy Vile.
  - Bowser (performed by David Rudman) - Bowser is a St. Bernard who is the hulking slow-witted handyman and Bruno's assistant who has a tendency to aide or hinder him. He served as the inspiration for Bruiser.
- Ms. Fluffé (performed by Kathryn Mullen in season one, Lisa Buckley in later seasons) - A cat who is the landlady of the apartment that Eliot lives in. Ms. Fluffé often comes in conflict with Bruno over building policies and his tendency towards incompetence where Bruno generally kowtows to her. She served as the inspiration for Kitty.

== Episodes ==
=== Series overview ===
Season	Episodes	Originally released	
Season	Episodes	First released	Last released
1	13	September 26, 1992	January 30, 1993
2	10	September 18, 1993	November 20, 1993
3	8	September 17, 1994	November 24, 1994

=== Season 1 (1992–93) ===
No. overall	No. in season	Title	Written by	Original release date
1	1	"The Big Squeak"	J.D. Smith	September 26, 1992
Canine animator Eliot Shag learns from his boss that he must remake his latest episode for his Ace Hart cartoon series, after deeming it too boring. Inspired by his young friend Artie's squeaky toy, Eliot devises a new story where Ace is forced to investigate a crime spree involving squeaky toys. He quickly discovers the culprit is crime boss Bugsy Vile, who recently kidnapped a millionaire and his safe, which can only be unlocked by the squeaky toy he owns.
2	2	"Taming of the Screw"	Peter Sauder	October 3, 1992
Eliot is unhappy when his desk falls apart because one of the screws keeping popping out. The incident inspires him to create an episode where Ace is hired to track down escaped lunatric Screwy Louie (real name Philip Robinson). When Screwy's destructive rampage across the city attracts the attention of Bugsy's gang, who are eager to recruit him to commit crimes, Ace is forced to find out where he will strike next before innocent lives are placed in danger.
3	3	"Meat the Butcher"	J.D. Smith	October 10, 1992
Ace is surprised when Eliot begins animating a new episode with increased violence, after being instructed to by his boss. To make matters complicated, Eliot's boss also instructs him to have an episode where Bugsy hires a hitman named Meat the Butcher to get revenge on Ace for shutting down his rackets. Although Ace likes the new format for his cartoon show, Eliot is concerned it might cause his character to get into serious trouble.
4	4	"Disobedience School"	Jim Lewis & Peter Sauder	October 17, 1992
Ace finds his next adventure seeing him return to Doggone Obedience School to track down Eddie, after the story is inspired by Eliot's recent discussion with Artie over his first day of school. Going undercover, he finds out that Bugsy and his gang are corrupting the young pups attending the school by teaching them all sorts of criminal skills. Ace and Eddie soon have to put a stop to this scheme, when they learn Bugsy intends for the students to use what they know to rob a bank.
5	5	"The Dog Pound"	Peter Sauder	October 31, 1992
Eliot is worried about going to jail when Bruno calls the police on him for chewing up one of his slippers. When Ace boasts he could tackle being behind bars easily, Eliot decides to call his bluff by creating a story in which the private detective is framed for stealing a priceless slipper. Ace is forced to rely on Rosie for help, after being sent to the Dog Pound, but soon has to break out when she gets herself into trouble with the real thief.
6	6	"Radio Dazed"	Marty Isenberg & Robert N. Skir	November 14, 1992
Eliot, whilst having his television fixed, is inspired by the local repairman's story about how they used to enjoy entertainment on the radio, whilst his TV is being fixed. This leads the animator to create a story in which Ace is hired by Dog City's radio station, WFIDO, to investigate a spate of suspicious accidents that threaten to takes the station off the airwaves. However, Ace is not happy when Eliot tries to make the case tougher than usual by including a more complex storyline.
7	7	"The Bloodhound"	Mark Saraceni & Peter Sauder	November 21, 1992
Eliot fears Colleen's new friend Bram might be a vampire when he meets them during a stormy night of animating his cartoon series. This inspires him to create a supernatural-themed episode where Ace is investigating a spate of attacks across Dog City that seem to be the work of a vampire. While Ace is not thrilled at what Eliot's story involves, he reluctantly plays out the story by determining to track down the culprit with help from Eddie and Rosie.
8	8	"Adventures in Puppysitting"	Marty Isenberg, Robert N. Skir, Michael Edens & Mark Edens	November 28, 1992
Eliot is asked to puppsit Colleen's baby nephew Pomeroy whilst she attends to business. This inspires the animator to create a story where Ace unknowingly puppysits master thief Puppy-faced Felson, who specializes in disguising himself as a baby and recently stole a diamond from a movie star for Bugsy. But Pomeroy proves a handful for Eliot and quickly gives Ace problems when he tries messing with his cartoon. Note: The Muppet character of Pomeroy was recycled from one created for the Dog City segment in The Jim Henson Hour.
9	9	"Ya Gotta Have Hart"	J.D. Smith	December 19, 1992
Eliot is fired by his boss, after he refuses to make several changes requested of him regarding how Ace is portrayed on TV. Bruno, the superintendent of Eliot's building, soon delights in this news, knowing he will be evicted if he can't pay the rent. Eliot swiftly tries to get Ace to star in different roles, ranging from commercials, to a French film and children's nursery rhymes. But each plan leads him to realize he can't bring himself to change how much he prefers Ace for who he is in his opinion.
10	10	"In Your Dreams"	Jim Lewis	January 9, 1993
Eliot falls asleep whilst working on his latest episode in which all of Dog City's police force is dognapped by Bugsy, and dreams himself into Ace's cartoon world. While the animator delights in starring alongside his creation, Ace finds it unbearable when they have to move through a twisted dream world, only for Eliot to get all the glory by solving the case. When it comes to finishing the episode, the detective decides to call the shots, only to learn making a story is harder than it looks.
11	11	"Rocketship K-9"	Robert N. Skir, Marty Isenberg & J.D. Smith	January 16, 1993
Bruno mistakenly believes aliens are invading, unaware fans of the Moondoggy Show are arriving in the city for a convention. Amused by this, Eliot uses it as inspiration for a new cartoon where Ace finds himself getting stuck on a rocket heading for the moon, alongside Bugsy and a Russian-accented double agent cat named Bestov Breed from Catsylvania. However, all don't expect to run into by Baron von Rottweiler as he plots his latest scheme to take over the world.
12	12	"Cats 'n' Dogs"	Kirk R. Thatcher	January 23, 1993
Bruno is fired by the building's owner, Ms. Fluffé, for accusing cats for causing an infestation of fleas in Elliot's p. The incident inspires Eliot with a new story in which Ace is asked by Rosie to bring down the leader of the East Side Cats - Clawed Badly. The private detective is forced to go undercover, and soon discovers Clawed, who is fighting against Bugsy, intends to use a flea bomb to spread fleas to dogs across Dog City.
13	13	"Is It Arf?"	Vincent Grittani	January 30, 1993
Ace is shocked when Eliot reveals that his next story has been inspired by Artie's love of world famous fictional detective Surelick Bones. The detective finds himself on a new case involving tracking down a art thief who is actively working within Dog City, only for Rosie to hire Bones to investigate the matter on belief her favourite detective is not up to the task. But Eliot soon reveals the story is aimed at proving to Artie that Ace is the better private detective over Bones.

=== Season 2 (1993) ===
No. overall	No. in season	Title	Written by	Original release date
14	1	"Boss Bruiser"	Marty Isenberg & Robert N. Skir	September 18, 1993
Bruno is fired by Ms. Fluffé for causing damage to Eliot's apartment ceiling, leading to Bowser being appointed as the building's new superintendent. The situation inspires Eliot to animate an episode of Ace Hart in which Bugsy appoints Bruiser to lead his gang, much to Frisky's dislike - especially when he unintentionally causes Bruiser to pull off heists around Dog City that Ace is hired to investigate.
15	2	"Springer Fever"	Jim Lewis	September 25, 1993
After Colleen moves out of his apartment building, Eliot finds new inspiration for Rosie's personality in the form of Artie's mother Terri, whom he falls in love with after she moves into the building. Ace swiftly finds Eliot's new romantic interest a major problem with animating his latest story, which sees the detective working with Rosie to track down Bugsy, who has kidnapped the Mayor's secretary.
16	3	"Much Ado About Mad Dog"	Marty Isenberg & Robert N. Skir	October 2, 1993
Ace is not happy when Eliot animates a new story for him in which Mad Dog becomes loyal to him after the private detective saves his life. Rosie swiftly uses the situation to have Ace put a stop to Bugsy's latest criminal scheme. Meanwhile, Artie becomes greatly concerned he will ruin things for his mother, after ruining a hat belonging to a businessman that Terri is conducting a deal with. Note: Colonel Claghound is a recycled version of Lyle the Dog that featured in The Muppet Show.
17	4	"Of Mutts and Mayors"	David Finley	October 9, 1993
Bruno makes claims he has taken over from Ms. Fluffé as his apartment building's new owner, inspiring Eliot with a story in which Bugsy decides to become mayor of Dog City. After removing the current mayor and rigging the election, he quickly has Ace and Rosie fired and swiftly delights in his newfound powers. But Eliot assures Ace the situation will not last for long, as the newfound position causes unwanted issues for Bugsy.
18	5	"Who Watches the Watchdog?"	Marty Isenberg & Robert N. Skir	October 16, 1993
Eliot helps Artie to repair his Bite-Man figure, and uncovers his old Watch Hound novels that he enjoyed reading. The thought of superheroes leads the animator to create a story where Ace investigates a bizarre string of crimes being committed by the Labrador Gang, culminating in the sudden arrival of a superhero called WatchDog. However, unknown to Ace, Bugsy seizes this opportunity to steal rare comics from a comic convention. Note: The episode pays homage to and parodies the comics of Marvel Comics and Stan Lee.
19	6	"The Great Dane Curse"	Dale Schott	October 23, 1993
Ace finds himself hired by a wealthy heiress to help her out with a private matter, but discovers that her controlling father believes they are dating. Ace decides to uncover the truth behind what is happening, per Eliot's romance-themed story, only to learn that the heiress is dating Bugsy's nephew Bruiser. Meanwhile, Eliot is nervous about expressing his true feelings for Terri, until Artie decides to help him out.
20	7	"Out of the Mouths of Pups"	Rich Fogel & Mark Seidenberg	October 30, 1993
Eliot is drawing a blank for a new Ace Hart episode, until Artie reveals he has received fan mail for his cartoon series. Inspired by these, Eliot attempts to create a new story from suggestions given by his fans, but Ace is deeply worried when the story creates a variety of crazy scenes. The animator soon realizes his mistake, and soon begins to doubt if he can produce an original episode ever again.
21	8	"Farewell, My Rosie"	Jim Lewis	November 6, 1993
Ace is disappointed when Rosie doesn't turn up to celebrate him solving his 1,000th case, let alone annoyed Eliot is distracted by a TV crew doing a piece on him. To aliveate his concerns, the animator creates a story in which Ace is hired to find where Rosie has gone to, in the process learning how little he knows about her past, while shocked to find she became involved with Bugsy and Rottweiler in her youth.
22	9	"Old Dogs, New Tricks"	Julia Jane Lewald	November 13, 1993
Eliot is delighted to reunite with his old animation teacher Scratch McCollie, who used to make a cartoon series with a character called Sam Spayed. The reunion inspires Eliot to make a cartoon where Ace teams up with Sam, whom the animator explains taught him all he needed to know to be a private detective. But both Eliot and Ace soon disagree with Scratch and Sam respectively on how to handle their latest story. Note: Scratch McCollie is a refurbished version of the Wolfhound from The Muppet Show.
23	10	"Sick as a Dog"	J.D. Smith	November 20, 1993
Eliot faces a deadline with his newest episode for the Ace Hart series, but struggles to do so after falling ill. Artie, Terri and Bruno soon decide to help when he becomes delirious with fever, adding their own ideas to a story concerning Ace attempting to stop Bugsy and his gang from stealing the antidote to a flea bug that can make dogs lose all their fur. But their ideas create some chaotic issues for Eliot to resolve when he recovers.

=== Season 3 (1994) ===
No. overall	No. in season	Title	Written by	Original release date
24	1	"The New Litter"	J.D. Smith	September 17, 1994
Artie is eager to make his own cartoon, but struggles to come up with ideas. Eliot helps by providing him advice and guidance to steer him in the right direction, while working on two new cartoons alongside his Ace Hart series. For Ace, he and Eddie visit Jurassic Bark, an island park that recently cloned dinosaurs back into existence with a secret chemical, in order to prevent Bugsy stealing the chemical.
25	2	"Doggy See, Doggy Do"	David Finley	September 24, 1994
Eliot has kindergarten television on the mind with his latest story, which Ace quickly has concerns about. In the new story, Ace finds himself investigating thefts being committed by children's TV star Bernie, only to discover that Bugsy is posing as the real star, who he has kidnapped. Meanwhile, Artie faces being grounded by his mother after she learns he has gotten bad grades at school with multiplications, prompting Eliot to help him out.
26	3	"Comedy of Horrors"	Craig Shemin & J.D. Smith	October 1, 1994
In a pair of horror-themed cartoons, Eliot devises a story in which Ace and Eddie have to rescue Rosie from Rottweiler before she is married to a monster, while Artie has his character Mr Mookie fights a monster. Meanwhile, a mad dog who resembles Bowser turns up in Eliot's apartment building, leading the animator, Artie and Bruno being terriorized when he comes after them during a stormy night.
27	4	"Howl the Conquering Hero"	Cliff MacGillivray	October 8, 1994
Artie is working on a report concerning who is hero is, leading Eliot and Terri to convince him that ordinary people should be considered rather than superheroes. Meanwhile, Ace is given a story in which he has to stop Bugsy from winning Dog City's Hero of the Year Award, after the crime boss stages accidents so he can rescue those caught up in them, while Mr Mookie spends a recess working to cure the President.
28	5	"Reduce, Re-Use, Retrieve"	John Ludin	November 5, 1994
Artie is eager to make a difference, and so begins a campaign to have the apartment residents learn to recycle things, and not create excess wastage. Eliot creates an environmentally-themed series of shorts, including a story in which Ace investigates the theft of trees outside Dog City. Aided by Eddie, the pair find that Rottweiler is behind the thefts, and using the trees as part of his latest world conquest plot.
29	6	"Future Schlock"	David Finley	November 12, 1994
Ace is thrown into a time-travel story when Rottweiler changes the past to gain control over Dog City. To prevent this, he and Eddie go back to the founding of the city in the 1600s to prevent Rottweiler interfering with history in the first place. Meanwhile, Artie is nervous about moving on into Fifth Grade at school, until he comes to Eliot's aid when become nervous of using his new computer he recently bought.
30	7	"No Pain, No Brain"	Marty Isenberg & Robert N. Skir	November 19, 1994
Eliot tries to get in shape for the annual marathon, after learning Terri is entering with a new jogging partner. Inspired by health and fitness, he creates an episode where Ace is hired by Rosie to enter the Fidolymplics in order to thwart Bugsy, who seeks to win through cheating. Meanwhile, Artie creates a story where Mr Mookie competes against a tortoise in a race.
31	8	"Dog Days of Summer Vacation"	David Finley & J.D. Smith	November 26, 1994
Ace is surprised when Eliot creates a story about him going on a family vacation with Eddie, Rosie, and Dot. The animator reveals how he values family vacations at Summer, especially as Terri and Artie are planning to head out on one. But Eliot explains Ace's situation is just an undercover role, so he can travel the country to stop a crooked criminal called the Vandalizer ruining vacations for others.

== Cast ==
=== Muppet performers ===
- Fran Brill as Terri Springer, Colleen Barker
- Lisa Buckley as Ms. Fluffé (Seasons 2 and 3)
- Kevin Clash as Eliot Shag
- John Kennedy as Additional characters
- Noel MacNeal as Officer Fuzzy (ep. 11), Doctor (ep. 23)
- Jim Martin as Bob Katz (ep. 12)
- Joey Mazzarino as Artie Springer, Officer Fuzzy (ep. 5)
- Brian Muehl as Bruno
- Jerry Nelson as Big Time Producer (ep. 9)
- Carmen Osbahr as Additional characters
- Don Reardon as Assistant Puppeteer for Eliot Shag
- Martin P. Robinson as Mr. MacTaggert (ep. 6), Scratch McCollie (ep. 23)
- David Rudman as Bowser, Bram (ep. 7), Colonel Claghound (ep. 16)

=== Voice cast ===
- George Buza as Steven
- Tara Charendoff as Dot
- Paulina Gillis as Kitty, Eliot Shag's mother (ep. 10)
- Elizabeth Hanna as Rosie O'Gravy
- Dan Hennessey as Baron Von Rottweiler, Meat the Butcher (ep. 3), Additional Voices
- Howard Jerome as Bruiser
- Stephen Ouimette as Mad Dog, Mayor Kickbark
- James Rankin as Frisky
- Rino Romano as Yves
- John Stocker as Bugsy Vile, Spunky the Flunky
- Stuart Stone as Eddie
- Ron White as Ace Hart

==== Additional voices ====
- Harvey Atkin
- Richard Binsley as Screwy Louie (ep. 2)
- Len Carlson as Hear Boy/Spot (ep. 6)
- Alyson Court as Candace Dane (ep. 19)
- Colin Fox as Claude Baddeley (ep. 12)
- Don Francks as Fob Canine/Watchdog (ep. 18)
- Keith Knight
- Susan Roman
- Ron Rubin
- Chris Wiggins

== Home releases ==
Two VHS tapes, each featuring two episodes, were released by Sony Wonder (under license from Nelvana Limited). Much Ado About Mad Dog contains Much Ado About Mad Dog and Old Dogs, New Tricks. The Big Squeak contains The Big Squeak and Boss Bruiser. Another VHS tape, Disobedience School, was released in the UK by Channel 4 and contains Disobedience School, The Dog Pound, and Radio Daze.

Dog City: The Movie was released only on region 2 DVD in the United Kingdom, and a Region 1 DVD was released on June 8, 2010 in the United States, though the series has not had any DVD release. All three seasons are available on Prime Video and Tubi. The series is also available on Nelvana's Retro Rerun YouTube channel.
