= Lip Service (1988 film) =

1988 TV film directed by William H. Macy

- Genre: Comedy
- Screenplay by: Howard Korder
- Directed by: William H. Macy
- Starring: Griffin Dunne; Paul Dooley; Jonathan Katz; Fran Brill; John C. Jones; Felicity Huffman
- Theme music composer: David Yazbek
- Country of origin: United States
- Original language: English

Production
- Executive producer: Michael Hausman
- Producers: Ned Dowd; David Mamet
- Cinematography: David Bridges
- Editor: Stephen P. Dunn
- Running time: 67 minutes
- Production company: HBO Showcase

Original release
- Network: HBO
- Release: October 17, 1988

Lip Service is a 1988 American comedy TV film directed by William H. Macy and written by Howard Korder. The film stars Griffin Dunne, Paul Dooley, Jonathan Katz, Fran Brill, John C. Jones and Felicity Huffman. The film premiered on HBO on October 17, 1988.

== Cast ==
- Griffin Dunne as Lennard "Len" Burdette
- Paul Dooley as Gilbert "Gil" Hutchinson
- Jonathan Katz as Jerry
- Fran Brill as Debbie
- John C. Jones as Hank
- Felicity Huffman as Woman P.A.
- Scott Zigler as Salesman #1
- Colin Stinton as Salesman #2
- Christopher Kaldor as Hunter
- Raynor Scheine as Walter "The Weather Moose"
- Brenda Huggins as Reporter
- Michael Feingold as Warren Yarlsberg
- Amanda Witman as High School Girl
