= Sesame Street Presents: Follow That Bird =

1985 feature film featuring Sesame Street characters

- Theatrical release poster by Steven Chorney
- Directed by: Ken Kwapis
- Written by: Tony Geiss; Judy Freudberg
- Based on: Sesame Street by Joan Ganz Cooney; Lloyd Morrisett Big Bird by Jim Henson
- Produced by: Tony Garnett
- Starring: Sandra Bernhard; John Candy; Chevy Chase; Joe Flaherty; Waylon Jennings; Dave Thomas; Caroll Spinney; Jim Henson; Frank Oz
- Cinematography: Curtis Clark
- Edited by: Evan Landis
- Music by: Van Dyke Parks; Lennie Niehaus
- Production company: Children's Television Workshop
- Distributed by: Warner Bros.
- Release date: August 2, 1985
- Running time: 88 minutes
- Country: United States
- Language: English
- Box office: $14 million

Sesame Street Presents: Follow That Bird (or simply Follow That Bird) is a 1985 American family musical comedy film directed by Ken Kwapis, and written by Tony Geiss and Judy Freudberg. Based on the children's television series Sesame Street, it was the series' first theatrical feature film. It stars Muppet performers Caroll Spinney, Jim Henson and Frank Oz alongside Sandra Bernhard, John Candy, Chevy Chase, Joe Flaherty, Waylon Jennings, and Dave Thomas. It was filmed at the Cinespace Film Studios and on location in the Greater Toronto Area.

Follow That Bird was theatrically released in the United States on August 2, 1985, by Warner Bros., and grossed $14 million.

== Plot ==
The Feathered Friends' Board of Birds, an organization whose purpose is to place stray birds with bird families discusses the case of Big Bird. A strict social worker, Miss Finch, is sent to Sesame Street in New York City to find and bring Big Bird to a worthy family of dodos in Oceanview, Illinois. However, he begins to feel uncomfortable staying with them as they all think poorly of non-birds. He reaches his breaking point when they insist he should have a bird as a best friend instead of Mr. Snuffleupagus, who is watching over his nest back on Sesame Street.

Big Bird leaves the Dodos' home to return to Sesame Street. He sees a news report where Miss Finch tells reporter Kermit the Frog that she intends to find him and bring him back to the Dodos. His friends on Sesame Street (including Bob, Linda, Luis, Maria, Gordon and Olivia) also see the news and band together to locate him before Miss Finch does, and take several vehicles on their quest. Bob instructs them to head to Toadstool, Indiana, to meet up with Big Bird. While on the way home, Big Bird hitches a ride with a trucker, who encourages him to persevere, and later meets two kids named Ruthie and Floyd at a farm, who allow him to sleep in their barn overnight. The next morning, Miss Finch arrives and he sneaks away.

Con artist brothers Sam and Sid Sleaze operate a fraudulent carnival called The Sleaze Brothers Funfair, and plot to catch Big Bird and put him on display for profit. When he arrives in Toadstool, Miss Finch does so at the same time and chases him through a parade. After escaping, Big Bird meets the Sleazes at their carnival and asks if they have a place to hide, resulting in them putting him in their cage and deciding to paint him blue and tout him as "The Bluebird of Happiness", though he sings sadly about wishing to be back home. Despite this, he brings in plenty of customers.

After the show, two kids sneak backstage to see Big Bird, who asks them to call Sesame Street to inform his friends of his whereabouts. The next morning, his friends sneak into the circus tent and try to set him free. However, the Sleaze Brothers quietly wake up and just as Linda unlocks the cage, they drive off in their truck towing the cage with Big Bird still in it. Gordon and Susan give chase and rescue him after he jumps from the moving truck. Shortly afterwards, a state trooper pulls the Sleazes over for speeding and arrests the pair.

Upon arriving back in Manhattan on Sesame Street, Big Bird is happy to be back home. Miss Finch arrives to place him with another bird family, having accepted that Big Bird was not happy with the Dodos but still insists that Big Bird would be "happier with his own kind." However, Maria tells her that he is happy on Sesame Street where it does not matter that his family consists of humans, honkers, monsters, Grouches, and other species. Realizing Maria is right, and acknowledging that they traveled all that way to find Big Bird, a sympathetic Miss Finch officially declares Sesame Street to be his home and happily leaves with her job complete. Afterwards, Big Bird reunites with Mr. Snuffleupagus. As everyone celebrates Big Bird's return, Oscar the Grouch gets carried around the block in his trash can by Bruno the Trashman in order to get away from everyone's happiness.

== Cast ==
- Paul Bartel as the Grouch Diner Cook
- Sandra Bernhard as the Grouch Diner Waitress
- John Candy as Officer Nelson, a State Trooper who arrests the Sleaze Brothers
- Chevy Chase as the Newscaster
- Joe Flaherty as Sid Sleaze, a con artist and one half of the Sleaze Brothers who is the more childlike of the duo
- Waylon Jennings as the Turkey Truck Driver
- Dave Thomas as Sam Sleaze, a con artist and one half of the Sleaze Brothers who is the more intelligent of the duo
- Alyson Court as Ruthie Darcy
- Benjamin Barrett as Floyd Darcy
- Richard Campbell as a boy whose apple is stolen by the Sleaze Brothers
- Liston Bates as a rescue boy
- Tawny Richard as a rescue girl
- Adrian McCalla as a kid with a map
- Tanya Marie Cook as Tanya
- Shawna Stoll as an airline announcer

=== Muppet performers ===
- Caroll Spinney as Big Bird, Oscar the Grouch and Bruno the Trashman
- Jim Henson as Kermit the Frog and Ernie
- Frank Oz as Cookie Monster, Bert and Grover
- Jerry Nelson as Count von Count, Herry Monster and Biff
- Richard Hunt as Gladys, Bird Member #2 and Sully
- Kathryn Mullen as Grouch Diner Patron #2 and Little Girl
- Sally Kellerman as Miss Finch (voice)
  - Cheryl Wagner as Miss Finch (performer)
- Brian Hohlfeld as Daddy Dodo (voice)
  - Gord Robertson as Daddy Dodo (performer)
- Laraine Newman as Mommy Dodo (voice)
  - Patricia Leeper as Mommy Dodo (performer)
- Eddie Deezen as Donnie Dodo (voice)
  - Jeff Weiser as Donnie Dodo (performer)
- Cathy Silvers as Marie Dodo (voice)
  - Shari Weiser as Marie Dodo (performer)
- Martin P. Robinson as Mr. Snuffleupagus, Telly, Grouch Diner Patron #1, Poco Loco and Bird Member #1
  - Bryant Young as Mr. Snuffleupagus (back-end performer)
- Noel MacNeal as Madame Chairbird
- Fred Garbo Garver as Turkey, Owl and Barkley
- Tim Gosley as Bird Member #3 and Honker
- Pam Arciero as Grundgetta
- Kevin Clash as Elmo

Additional Board of Bird members performed by Bob Stutt, Nikki Tilroe, Lee Armstrong, Patricia Leeper, Rob Mills, and John Pattison.

Additional Muppets performed by Frank Meschkuleit, Terry Angus, Matthew Pidgeon, Stephen Brathwaite, Tom Vandenberg, Francine Anderson, Ron Wagner, Martine Carrier, Karen Valleau, Michelle Frey, Gus Harsfai, Patricia Lewis, Charlotte Levinson, Carolanne McLean, Peter McCowatt, Brian Moffatt, Myra Fried, Jani Lauzon and Sandra Shamas.

=== Humans of Sesame Street ===
- Linda Bove as Linda
- Emilio Delgado as Luis Rodriguez
- Loretta Long as Susan Robinson
- Sonia Manzano as Maria Rodriguez
- Bob McGrath as Bob Johnson
- Roscoe Orman as Gordon Robinson
- Alaina Reed as Olivia Robinson
- Kermit Love as Willy

== Production ==
The film was shot on location in Ontario, Canada (Bolton, Schomberg, Woodbridge and Georgetown), and at Toronto International Studios (now Cinespace Film Studios) in 1984. The street set, rebuilt to make it look more realistic than in the television series, was expanded in the film to include a music store, a fire station, an auto body shop, a family clinic, a bakery, a bookstore, and a grocery store.

According to Noel MacNeal, after completing the footage of Big Bird on the farm with Ruthie and Floyd, the filmmakers discovered that the film was badly scratched and unusable. The actors, crew, and performers promptly had to return to the same location months later in winter, whereupon many of the green leaves in the film are spray-painted and after each take, the kids would run to put their coats on. Early in production, the crew noticed that Oscar's trash can looked too new, so they banged it up and dirtied it to match the one in the television series.

While filming Bert and Ernie's "upside down world" song, Jim Henson and Frank Oz were actually in an upside down biplane eighteen feet from the ground.

After filming wrapped, the filmmakers did not believe that the voice of Cheryl Wagner, who had performed Miss Finch while simultaneously voicing her, seemed appropriate for the character, so her voice was dubbed over by that of Sally Kellerman. This would be her only Muppet film before her death in 2022.

Before Ken Kwapis was chosen to direct, John Landis (who had previously performed Grover in the "Rainbow Connection" finale in The Muppet Movie) was asked by Warner Bros. However, Landis had to decline due to scheduling conflicts with Into the Night.

Due to his criminal record, Northern Calloway was banned from entering Canada, which led the writers to remove his character, David, from the script.

This is the only Sesame Street feature film to star both Henson (as Kermit the Frog and Ernie) and Richard Hunt and the last Muppet film to involve them before their deaths in 1990 and 1992 respectively.

== Musical numbers ==
1. "The Grouch Anthem" (Jeff Pennig, Jeff Harrington, and Steve Pippin) – Oscar the Grouch and the Grouch chorus
2. "Sesame Street Theme" (Joe Raposo, Jon Stone, and Bruce Hart)
3. "Ain't No Road Too Long" (Pennig, Harrington, and Pippin) – Waylon Jennings, Gordon, Olivia, Grover, Count von Count and Big Bird
4. "One Little Star" (Jeff Moss) – Big Bird, Olivia and Mr. Snuffleupagus
5. "Easy Goin' Day" (Pennig, Harrington, and Pippin) – Big Bird, Floyd and Ruthie
6. "Upside Down World" (Moss) – Ernie and Bert
7. "All Together Now" (Wood Newton and Michael Noble) – Alabama
8. "Workin' on My Attitude" (Eddie Setser and Troy Seals) – Ronnie Milsap
9. "I'm So Blue" (Randy Sharp and Karen Brooks) – Big Bird

=== Soundtrack ===
Sesame Street Presents: Follow That Bird

Soundtrack album by Sesame Street
- Released: 1985
- Genre: Soundtrack
- Label: RCA
- Producers: Jim Henson; Steve Buckingham

Sesame Street chronology
Sesame Street Christmas Sing-Along (1984)	Sesame Street Presents: Follow That Bird (1985)	Christmas on Sesame Street (1986)

Track list

Side one

1. "The Grouch Anthem"
2. "Big Bird's Goodbye/The Runaway" – Big Bird, Mr. Snuffleupagus, and Kermit the Frog
3. "Ain't No Road Too Long"
4. "Big Bird on the Farm/One Little Star" – Big Bird, Ruthie, Floyd, Olivia, and Mr. Snuffleupagus
5. "Easy Goin' Day"

Side two

6. "Don't Drop Inn/Workin' on My Attitude" – Ronnie Milsap (Written by Eddie Setser and Troy Seals)
7. "Upside Down World"
8. "I'm So Blue"
9. "The Chase/Sesame Street Theme" – Big Bird, Gordon, and Olivia
10. "All Together Now"

== Reception ==
=== Critical response ===
On Rotten Tomatoes, the film has a rating of 92% based on 12 reviews, with an average score of 6.40/10. On Metacritic, which uses a weighted average, the film has a score of 59 out of 100 based on 9 critics, indicating "mixed or average" reviews.

The Orlando Sentinel called the film "a flip and funny 'road picture' for children that doesn't let its kind heart get in the way of its often biting wit." Walter Goodman observed in The New York Times that "by and large, the script by Tony Geiss and Judy Freudberg and the direction by Ken Kwapis don't strain for yuks; what they seek, and more often than not attain, is a tone of kindly kidding."

=== Box office ===
Despite being moderately well received, the film underperformed at the box office due to having opened the same day as Fright Night and Weird Science, and faced heavy competition from Back to the Future, Mad Max Beyond Thunderdome, Pee-wee's Big Adventure, Disney's The Black Cauldron and National Lampoon's European Vacation among other films. It grossed $2,415,626 on its opening weekend. By the end of its theatrical run, its total gross was $13,961,370. This production, along with other unsuccessful ventures, hurt the Children's Television Workshop financially during the 1980s, though they did recover afterwards.

== Home media ==
The film was first released on VHS and LaserDisc in 1986. It received three successive home video re-releases by Warner Bros. Family Entertainment in 1993, 1999 and 2002, and also on DVD (which was presented in a full-screen presentation). Another DVD release followed in 2004, which was re-issued as a special "25th Anniversary Edition" in 2009 in its original widescreen aspect ratio and new bonus features.

== Television ==
HBO aired the film on August 3, 1986.
