= Eureeka's Castle =

American children's television series

- Genre: Children's; Fantasy
- Created by: Debby Beece; Judy Katschke
- Written by: R. L. Stine (credited as Jovial Bob Stine)
- Creative director: Eli Noyes
- Starring: Cheryl Blaylock; Noel MacNeal; Jim Kroupa; Pam Arciero; Lynn Hippen; Brian Muehl
- Composer: Peter Lurye
- Country of origin: United States
- Original language: English
- No. of seasons: 3
- No. of episodes: 152 (+ 3 specials)

Production
- Executive producer: Kit Laybourne
- Producers: Kathleen Minton; Michael Holman
- Production location: Nickelodeon Studios (1990–1991)
- Camera setup: Multi-camera
- Running time: 51 minutes 25 minutes (half-hour episodes)
- Production companies: Noyes & Laybourne Enterprises

Original release
- Network: Nickelodeon
- Release: August 27, 1989 – November 10, 1991

Eureeka's Castle is an American children's puppet television series created by Debby Beece and Judy Katschke. R. L. Stine developed the characters and was the head writer of the show. It originally aired on Nickelodeon's Nick Jr. block from September 4, 1989, to November 10, 1991. The program featured various puppet characters who live in a giant's wind-up music box. The show was a joint development by Nickelodeon, animators Kit Laybourne and Eli Noyes of Noyes & Laybourne Enterprises, and the puppeteers at 3/Design Studio.

== Synopsis ==
The show follows various puppet characters including Eureeka, a sorceress-in-training. Eureeka and her friends live in a wind-up castle music box owned by a friendly giant. Other characters include Magellan the dragon, twin moat dwellers Bogge and Quagmire, Batly the bat, and Mr. Knack the handyman. There are also various appearing creatures such as mice, singing fish statues called the Fishtones, Magellan's pets Cooey and the Slurms, and Batly's pet Webster.

Halfway through the episode, an animated short based on a children's book (many of them acquired from Children's Circle) was shown. Also featured were shorter animated and live-action short films and European imports such as Animal Fair, Roobarb, The Shoe People, Towser, James the Cat, Plonsters, Philipp, Bojan the Bear, Lilliput Put, Zeno shorts, and Gran. Musical guests also appeared on the show, performing either in one of Mr. Knack's postcards, or at the castle in person.

== Characters ==
- Eureeka (performed by Cheryl Blaylock) is the title character and protagonist. Eureeka is a friendly sorceress-in-training. Her spells are not successful most of the time, but she keeps trying until she gets it right. Aside from her magic, she usually helps solve her friends' problems.
- Magellan (performed by Noel MacNeal) is a large, childlike green dragon with a tail that has a mind of its own. He does not always understand new concepts. Magellan tends to make great big sneezes that can shake the whole castle whenever he gets upset. He has a mother-son/older sibling like relationship with Eureeka. According to Eureeka, Magellan will do anything to try and stay awake past bedtime. One talent that Magellan can do is blow bubbles from his mouth.
  - Cooey (performed by Lynn Hippen) is Magellan's pet of indeterminate species.
  - Slurms are Magellan's pet worm hybrids.
  - Blanketeers are living blue dots on Magellan's blanket.
- Batly (performed by Jim Kroupa) is an egotistical, clumsy, blue bat who wears glasses due to being nearsighted. Despite being different in every way, he and Magellan are good friends. His flying usually ends with a crash landing prompting him to say "I meant to do that." Batly spends most of his time in the belfry and has a large bug collection. In a 2016 Reddit AMA, R.L. Stine said that Batly's face was modeled after his own son Matt.
  - Webster (performed by Noel MacNeal) is Batly's pet, a spider-like creature.
  - Fred is Batly's lightning bug whom he sleeps with.
- Bogge and Quagmire (performed by Brian Muehl and Pam Arciero) are the Moat Twins. They are two mischievous squabbling siblings who spend most of their time swimming in the polluted castle moat, eating peanut butter sandwiches, and playing in the basement. Bogge is orange while Quagmire is pink. They're never apart, unless there's a troubling situation. They tend to argue with each other, but work together when it comes to causing trouble. Bogge and Quagmire constantly try to steal Magellan's peanut butter sandwiches, but never succeed. They're capable of moving, talking, breathing, and playing on land or underwater with equal ease. Their favorite game is to challenge each other with tongue-twister statements, at which they are highly proficient. While they spend much of their time bickering, they quickly become bored and then saddened to the point of depression, if even temporarily separated from the other.
- Mr. Knack (performed by Brian Muehl) is the castle's handyman and tinker. He uses many unconventional methods for fixing things around the castle. Mr. Knack also loves to barter when he sells some of his inventions that he has made from his pushcart. Mr. Knack always gets some postcards which he reads to the viewers. His first name is "Nick", giving him the name Nick Knack.
- Sir Klank (performed by Jim Kroupa) is a blue mouse with a long gray beard who resides in a suit of armor.
- Kate (performed by Lynn Hippen) is a pink mouse who frequently reports on what happens in the castle.
- Emma (performed by Pam Arciero) is an orange mouse who loves to eat.
- The Fishtones are a trio of singing fish in the form of a stone fountain who spray water when they're not singing.
- The Giant (performed by Jim Kroupa) is a friendly full-bodied giant with a big nose and a long orange beard who owns the wind-up castle music box where the show takes place. In several episodes, he winds up the castle's music box key to introduce the episode's musical guest. The castle inhabitants are aware of his existence, and in rare incidents they attempt to summon his attention.

== Puppeteers ==
=== Main ===
- Pam Arciero as Quagmire, Emma
- Cheryl Blaylock as Eureeka
- Lynn Hippen as Cooey, Kate
- Jim Kroupa as Batly, Sir Klank, Giant
- Noel MacNeal as Magellan, Webster
- Brian Muehl as Bogge, Mr. Knack

=== Additional ===
- Rob Gardner
- John Kennedy
- Joey Mazzarino

== Production ==
Eureeka's Castle's ending credits state the show comes from an original concept by Debby Beece and Judy Katschke. In 1988, development of the show began by staff members at Nickelodeon and animator Eli Noyes and his partner Kit Laybourne, whose wife Geraldine Laybourne was the Head of Programming for Nickelodeon. "Jovial Bob Stine", best known for his children's horror novels written under the pen name R. L. Stine, was hired as the head writer to develop the concept, characters and episode scripts. The puppet design and construction for the characters were done at 3/Design Studio where the puppets were built by Jim Kroupa, John Orberg, Kip Rathke and Matt Stoddart.

Nickelodeon ordered 65 episodes of Eureeka's Castle, and Beece called it "the most ambitious program for preschoolers since the premiere of Sesame Street 20 years ago". The first episode of Eureeka's Castle premiered during Nickelodeon's Special Delivery block on August 27, 1989, before debuting on Nick Jr. on September 4. In May 1990, Eureeka's Castle was renewed for a 35-episode second season.

From 1990 to 1991, Nickelodeon created 52 half-hour episodes of Eureeka's Castle, compiling clips from the first two seasons, for international distribution and their participation in the Cable in the Classroom service. Nick Jr. continued to air the original hour-long episodes, which were shortened to half-hour episodes in 1994. Production on Eureeka's Castle ended in 1991; some of the show's crew later worked on Gullah Gullah Island.

== Episodes ==
=== Series overview ===
Season	Episodes	Originally released	
Season	Episodes	First released	Last released
1	65	August 27, 1989	December 1, 1989
2	35	August 1990	Fall 1991
3	52	July 1990	1991
Specials	3	November 27, 1990	November 10, 1991

=== Hour-long episodes (1989–1991) ===
==== Season 1 (1989) ====
No. overall	No. in season	Title	Original release date
1	1	TBA	August 27, 1989
Tom Chapin performs "Uh Oh, Accident". Story: The Amazing Bone
TBA	TBA	TBA	September 1989
Story: Tikki Tikki Tembo
TBA	TBA	TBA	1989
Magellan wants to get out of practicing a dance with Batly for the castle talent show. The mice tell jokes. The main characters sing "Dem Bones". Magellan and Batly question how they sleep during a sleepover. Batly sings about his habit of crashing. Stories: The Island of the Skog, Martha Ann and the Mother Store from The Wrong Way Kid
TBA	TBA	TBA	1989
Magellan wants to walk on his toes like Batly and asks Eureeka for help. The main characters perform a rap number about themselves in the castle. Towser is dared to stay in a haunted house. Magellan and Batly sing about the noises of the night. Story: Rapunzel
TBA	TBA	"Animals"	1989
Red Grammer teaches the gang how to say "Hello" in different languages. A wizard helps Towser fly. The Moat Twins argue over who's better in song. Magellan presents a couple short films about animals.
TBA	TBA	"Sunny Day"	1989
Jaye Davidson sings about a sunny day. Batly participates in a swap-off with Mr. Knack so he can receive a bug trap. The Fishtones sing about hot weather.
TBA	TBA	"Bedtime"	1989
Deborah Dunleavy sings about talking on the telephone. The wind freezes Towser's funny face. Magellan and Batly have trouble going to sleep. Eureeka tells the Moat Twins a story, but the twins keep questioning her story.
TBA	TBA	"Body Language"	1989
One of Mr. Knack's postcards shows The Jive Five performing their song "Hully Gully Callin' Time". Magellan trades his hiccups for Mr. Knack's basketball. The Nosey Parker causes trouble for Towser and his friends. The Moat Twins go for a swim. Eureeka introduces a couple short films about body language.
TBA	TBA	TBA	1989
Batly shames Magellan for trying to hatch birds from birdseed, then the gang performs a rap version of "Old MacDonald Had a Farm". Eureeka and Batly sing "I've Been Working on the Railroad" with Magellan blowing his horn. Towser tries to help a conjuror regain his confidence. Magellan acts as Mr. Knack's supervisor while he's hammering. Story: Mike Mulligan and His Steam Shovel

==== Season 2 (1990–1991) ====
No. overall	No. in season	Title	Original release date
TBA	TBA	TBA	1990
After the Moat Twins fool Magellan and Batly with scary noises, they try to scare the twins back. The Moat Twins sing about causing mischief. Bogge's attempt to take Magellan's peanut butter sandwich results in him getting none. Batly finds his caterpillar missing, but Eureeka and Magellan show him the caterpillar turning into a butterfly. Story: Just for You
TBA	TBA	TBA	1991
Magellan learns how to play detectives with Bogge. Magellan sings "The Dragon Sleeps Tonight". In the middle of the night, Magellan invites friends over to keep him company, which turns into a party. Magellan shows Quagmire what makes him unique.
TBA	TBA	TBA	1991
Mr. Knack wants to borrow the Moat Twins' "turnie turnie twisty twisty all the way down thing", but he needs Magellan's help. Eureeka teaches Magellan about animals found in an aquarium. Magellan wants to know from Batly what a friend is. The Moat Twins try not to trick Magellan out of eating his peanut butter sandwich. Story: Brave Irene
TBA	TBA	TBA	1991
Magellan and Batly compare Cooey and Webster. The Moat Twins attempt to clean up their messy room. Story: Madeline and the Bad Hat
TBA	TBA	TBA	1991
Eureeka, Mr. Knack, and Batly show Magellan what they do then they get grumpy. Batly tells Eureeka and Magellan a sad joke.

=== Half-hour episodes (1990–1991) ===
No. overall	No. in season	Title	Original release date
9	9	"Show 109"	1990
Magellan and Batly try to play baseball. When the Moat Twins get their baseball, they're challenged to a rhyming duel. Batly introduces Webster to "La Cucaracha". The Moat Twins sing about collecting. Mr. Knack successfully trades Magellan's frown for a tickle and sings about trading.

=== Specials (1990–1991) ===
No. overall	No. in season	Title	Original release date
1	1	"Christmas at Eureeka's Castle"	November 27, 1990
As Eureeka and her friends prepare for Christmas, Eureeka loses her magic, Batly loses his temper, and Magellan gets lost in the forest while looking for a Christmas tree. Magellan needs to be found before holiday festivities can begin.
2	2	"It Came From Beneath the Bed or Nightmare on Magellan Street"	October 19, 1991
In a musical mystery, Magellan confronts Fluffy, a strange monster who visits the castle and proves that scary-looking things can often be quite harmless.
3	3	"Don't Touch That Box"	November 10, 1991
Magellan, Batly and the Moat Twins find a magic box in the woods while playing catch. Eureeka calls the Grand Wizard (Luther Vandross), who tells them that the broken box is his and they shouldn't touch it. Eureeka warns the others about the box, but they become curious about the box and get more than what they bargained for from it. The gang tries to solve their problems with the box, but things get worse until the Grand Wizard arrives and fixes everything.

== Broadcast ==
The series premiered on August 27, 1989 on Nick Jr. Reruns of the show continued airing on Nick Jr. until July 12, 1996, and again from November 16, 1998, to January 29, 1999, and on Noggin from February 2, 1999, to September 6, 2000.

== Home video ==
Two Eureeka's Castle direct-to-video specials ("Sing Along with Eureeka" and "Wide Awake at Eureeka's Castle", both produced in 1990) and the "Christmas at Eureeka's Castle" special were released on VHS by Sony Wonder in 1995, and Paramount Home Video in 1997. The series has not been released on DVD or Blu-ray.

On April 21, 2021, 26 half-hour episodes of the show were added to Paramount+. This marks the first time the series had been legally available to watch in 20 years.

== Awards ==
In 1990, Eureeka's Castle won an Ace Award for best children's program.

== See also ==
- Allegra's Window
- Gullah Gullah Island
