= Jennifer Barnhart =

American actress

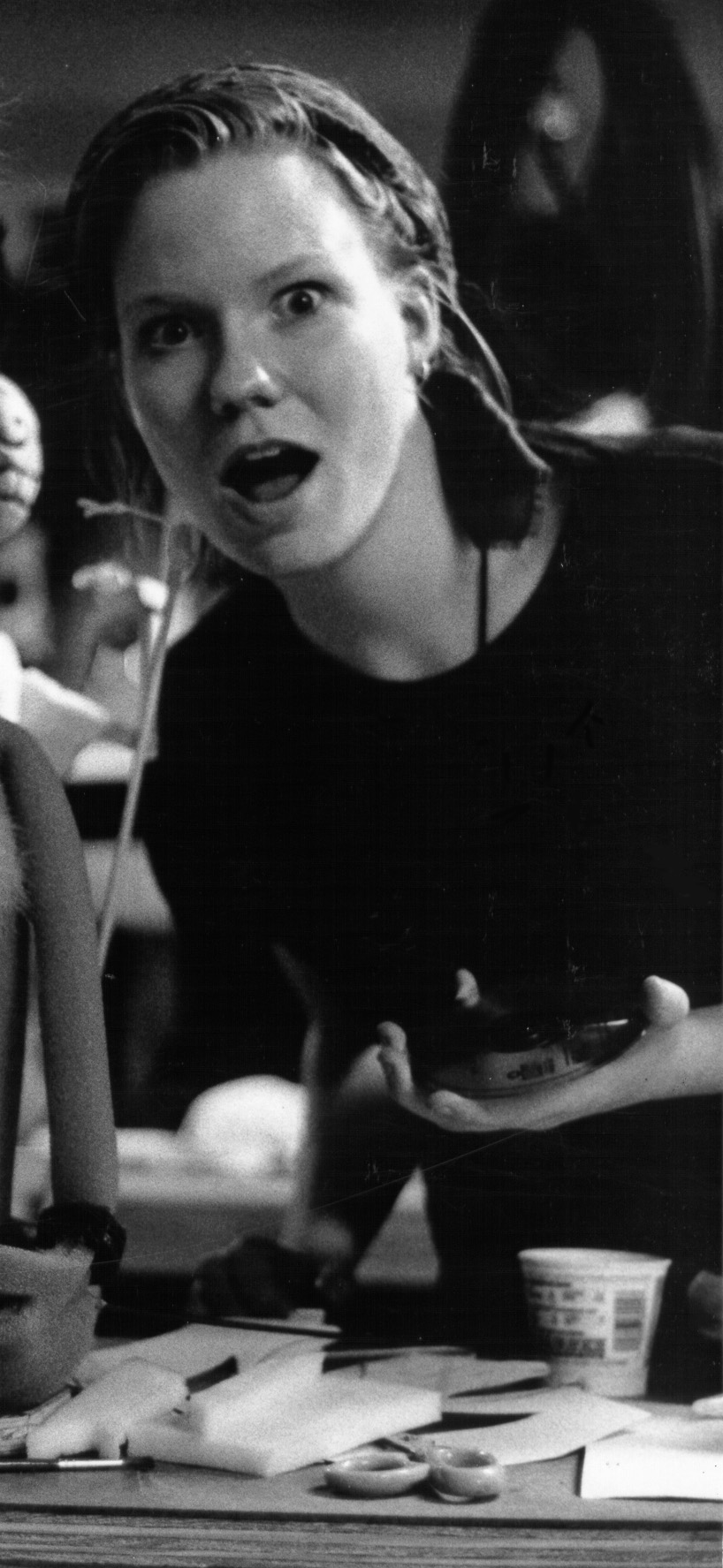
- Barnhart at UCONN in 1992
- Born: March 11, 1972 (age 54); Hamden, Connecticut, U.S.
- Education: University of Connecticut (BFA)
- Occupations: Actress, puppeteer
- Years active: 1994–present
- Notable work: Avenue Q, Law & Order: SVU, Johnny and the Sprites, Exposing the Order of the Serpentine

Jennifer Barnhart (born March 11, 1972) is an American actress and puppeteer, with a portfolio of television and theatre performances.

== Early life ==
Barnhart was born and grew up in Hamden, Connecticut. She graduated from the University of Connecticut with a Bachelor of Fine Arts in acting with a concentration in puppetry.

== Career ==
=== Puppetry career ===
In 1996, Barnhart began her puppeteer career performing on Once Upon a Tree performing Mara the Beaver and Mrs. Peeper the Owl. She made her Broadway debut in 2003 and is a featured performer in the Tony Award-winning musical Avenue Q, in which she also appeared Off-Broadway. She was a regular puppeteer on the Nickelodeon series Oobi, playing Mrs. Johnson and various incidental characters. She also stars as Cleo on PBS's literacy education series, Between the Lions, and performed the puppetry for Kanga and Owl on Disney Channel's The Book of Pooh. She is a Sesame Street Muppet performer who took over the roles of Mama Bear in 2001 and Gladys the Cow in 2002.

Barnhart also worked as a puppeteer in Johnny and the Sprites, a Disney Channel children's show created by her Avenue Q co-star John Tartaglia.

As of season 46 of Sesame Street, she performs the role of Zoe, following the retirement of Fran Brill in 2014.

=== Acting career ===
She appeared on screen as a puppeteer in the "Web" episode of Law & Order: SVU in May 2006. In regional theatre, she played the angel in Angels in America (Gallery Players), Olivia in Twelfth Night, and Cassie in Rumors (Connecticut Repertory Theatre). In 2011 she appeared as police officer Randy Osteen in Tracy Letts's new play "Superior Donuts" at the Arden Theatre in Philadelphia. In 2010, she portrayed Chicago Police Department detective Lorna Diamond in the Law & Order: SVU episode, "Behave".

== TV credits ==
- The Muppet Show, 2026
- Helpsters, 2019–2023
- Julie's Greenroom, 2017–2019
- The Chica Show, 2012–2014
- Law & Order: SVU, 2010
- Lomax, the Hound of Music, 2008
- Johnny and the Sprites, 2007
- Law & Order: SVU, 2006
- Exposing the Order of the Serpentine, 2006
- Sesame Street, 2001–present
- Smart Cookies, 2016
- Oobi, 2000–2005
- The Book of Pooh, 2001
- Between the Lions, 2000–2010
- Bear in the Big Blue House, 1997–1998
- Once Upon a Tree, 1996

Preceded by David Rudman	Performer of Mommy Snuffleupagus; 2000s - present	Succeeded by None
Preceded by Richard Hunt	Performer of Gladys the Cow; 2003 – present	Succeeded by None
Preceded by Alice Dinnean	Performer of Mama Bear; 2003 – present	Succeeded by None
Preceded by Fran Brill	Performer of Zoe; 2016 – present	Succeeded by None
Preceded by Alice Dinnean	Performer of Goldilocks; 2005	Succeeded by Fran Brill
