= Alice Dinnean =

American puppeteer

- Other names: Alice Dinnean-Vernon, Alice Vernon
- Education: Oberlin College (BA)
- Occupations: Puppeteer; writer; voice actress
- Years active: 1993–present
- Spouse: Peter Linz (m. 2023)

Alice Dinnean is an American puppeteer, writer and voice actress who works at The Jim Henson Company. Dinnean has performed on many children's television shows such as The Puzzle Place, Sesame Street, Big Bag, Bear in the Big Blue House, Cousin Skeeter, Jim Henson's Pajanimals, Sid the Science Kid and Jack's Big Music Show. She also did work on various non-Muppet productions such as Buffy the Vampire Slayer and Angel.

== Career ==
Her interest in puppetry began when she received a pig puppet as a prize for winning a local essay contest in Oakland, California. Following her studies at Oberlin College, she interned at the Center for Puppetry Arts in Atlanta, Georgia. In the early 1990s, she was employed with the Jim Henson Company where she performed characters for the children's TV series, Sesame Street. Some of her characters are Sherry Netherland, the owner of the Furry Arms Hotel, and Phoebe, a member of the Monster Clubhouse, from 2001 to 2003.

Non-Muppet productions in which she has performed include the horror-humor TV series, Buffy the Vampire Slayer. On the show, she performed as a demon puppet in As You Were and a living mummy hand in Life Serial. After the series ended in 2003, Dinnean performed the puppet-like character of Angel in the episode Smile Time along with Drew Massey.

Dinnean (as Alice Dinnean-Vernon) performed Mary on the Emmy-winning children's series, Jack's Big Music Show, created by Sesame Street puppeteer David Rudman.

In 2007, she wrote episodes and performed characters on the Disney Junior's children's show, Bunnytown. She performed Cowbella in the music videos on the Sprout channel's show, Pajanimals. Her residence is in Laurel Canyon, Los Angeles, California.

From September 8–10, 2017, she was an additional Muppet performer for a live show at the Hollywood Bowl titled The Muppets Take the Bowl.

== Personal life ==
On July 1, 2023, she married puppeteer Peter Linz.

== Filmography ==
- Sesame Street - Goldilocks (1996–2004), Phoebe, Mama Bear (1996–2002), Little Murray Sparkles, Sherry Netherland (1995–98), Additional Muppets
- The Puzzle Place - Julie Woo, Sizzle
- Big Bag - Sofie
- Bear in the Big Blue House - Grandma Flutter (1997–98)
- Kermit's Swamp Years - Vicki, Additional Muppets
- Jack's Big Music Show - Mary
- Sid the Science Kid - Gabriela, Alice
- Sid the Science Kid: The Movie - Gabriela, Alice, Miao Hu, QT9
- The Country Bears - Beary Barrington (face puppeteer)
- The Muppets - Alynda
- 123 Count with Me - Sherry Netherland
- Kids for Character - Julie Woo
- The Happytime Murders - Sheila
- The Shifting (2013) - Twin Showgirl
- Pajanimals - Cowbella
- Muppet Babies Play Date - Summer Penguin (puppeteer only)
- The Dark Crystal: Age of Resistance - Gelflings Brea, Maudra Fara, and Bobb'N (puppeteer), The Ornamentalist (skekEkt) (puppeteer and voice)
- The Muppet Show - Guest Starring Muppet Performer

Preceded by Jerry Nelson	Performer of Camilla the Chicken; 2005	Succeeded by Matt Vogel
Preceded by Camille Bonora	Performer of Mama Bear; 1996–2002	Succeeded by Jennifer Barnhart
Preceded by None	Performer of Phoebe; 2001	Succeeded by John Tartaglia
Preceded by Julianne Buescher	Performer of Sherry Netherland; 1995–98	Succeeded by None
Preceded by Camille Bonora	Performer of Goldilocks; 1996–2004	Succeeded by Jennifer Barnhart
