= Pam Arciero =

American puppeteer (born 1954)

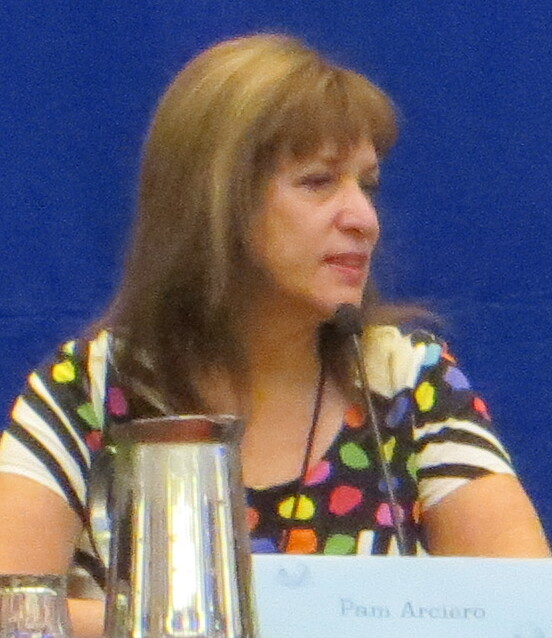
- Arciero at Dragon Con in 2015
- Born: Pamela Arciero; May 8, 1954 (age 71); Honolulu, Territory of Hawaii, U.S.
- Occupations: Puppeteer, voice actress
- Years active: 1982–present

Pamela Arciero (born May 8, 1954) is an American puppeteer and voice-over artist. She has performed for Between the Lions and Sesame Street, playing Oscar the Grouch's girlfriend Grundgetta in the latter. In addition to performance work, she worked as a director on the Noggin preschool series Oobi, which featured both writers and performers of Sesame Street. She is also the artistic director of the National Puppetry Conference at the Eugene O'Neill Theater Center.

== Career ==
Pam Arciero earned her Master's in Puppetry from the University of Connecticut.

Arciero took over the role of Oscar the Grouch's girlfriend, Grundgetta for Sesame Street from Brian Muehl, performing her in The Muppets Celebrate Jim Henson and Sesame Street: A Is for Asthma and continues to perform her to this day.

Arciero was a director for the second season of Oobi on Noggin. For the third season, she puppeteered various incidental characters. Arciero has performed characters for many other puppet shows, including Allegra's Window, Eureeka's Castle and Blue's Room on Nickelodeon, Between the Lions on PBS, and The Great Space Coaster.

She performed in Little Shop of Horrors at the Orpheum Theater and served as director for several live shows at Sesame Place and El Capitan Theater in Los Angeles.

Arciero currently serves as artistic director for the Eugene O'Neill Theater Center's National Puppetry Conference since 2002 and continues to participate in puppetry workshops and other events across the country.

She appears as herself in the documentaries Henson's Place and The World of Jim Henson, as well as herself and Grundgetta at Jim Henson's memorial service.

== Filmography ==
- Sesame Street: Grundgetta (1985–present), Sally Wilson, Additional Muppets
- Sesame Street Presents: Follow That Bird: Grundgetta
- Little Muppet Monsters: Penguin, Additional Muppets
- Sesame Street Stays Up Late!: Additional Muppets
- Sesame Street… 20 Years & Still Counting: Telly Monster (assistant)
- Eureeka's Castle: Quagmire and Emma
- Allegra's Window: Lindi, Allegra's Mom
- Blue's Room: Polka Dots (season 2)
- The Wubbulous World of Dr. Seuss: Little cats F and N, Lulu's Dog, Zubble-Wump, Snake, Mama Gink
- Sesame Street 4D: Additional characters
- Play with Me Sesame: Additional characters
- Oobi: Additional characters (also director for season 2)
- Lomax, the Hound of Music: Louise
- Sesame Street Jam: A Musical Celebration
- Learning About Letters
- Jim Henson's memorial service (appearing as herself and Grundgetta)
- Between the Lions: Leona Lion (Season 3 onwards)

Preceded by Brian Muehl	Performer of Grundgetta; 1984 – present	Succeeded by None
