= Fran Brill =

American actress (born 1946)

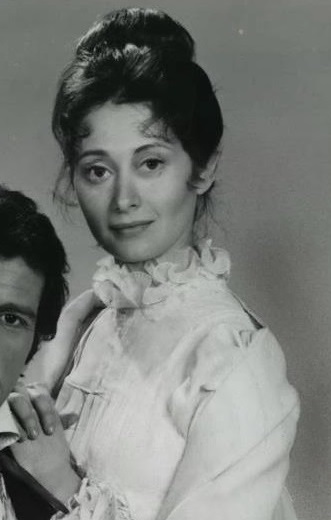
- Brill in 1975
- Born: September 30, 1946 (age 79); Chester, Pennsylvania, U.S.
- Occupations: Actress; puppeteer
- Years active: 1969–2015

Fran Brill (born September 30, 1946) is an American actress and puppeteer, best known for her roles on Sesame Street, as well as playing Sally Hayes in the Hal Ashby film Being There (1979), Dana Mardukas in the Martin Brest film Midnight Run (1988) and Lily Marvin in the Frank Oz film What About Bob? (1991).

Brill was honored with the Lifetime Achievement Award at the 3rd Children's and Family Emmy Awards in 2025.

== Life and career ==
Brill was born in Chester, Pennsylvania, and is a native of Swarthmore, Pennsylvania, the daughter of Dr. and Mrs. Joe Brill. Her father was a physician. She is a graduate of Boston University College of Fine Arts. Her early experience in acting came when she was 15 and performed in summer stock theater.

She began her career in theater, making her Broadway debut portraying a student leader in Red, White and Maddox (1969). Her other theatrical roles include leads at the Roundabout Theatre, Manhattan Theater Club, Playwrights Horizons and many regional theaters including the Long Wharf, Yale Repertory Theatre, Arena Stage, the Mark Taper Forum and the Actors Theatre of Louisville. She has been nominated twice for a Drama Desk Award, for What Every Woman Knows (1976) and for Knuckle (1981), respectively.

From 1974-1975, Brill played Fran Bachman on NBC's daytime drama How to Survive a Marriage. Her character struggled with sudden widowhood, and Brill received many condolence letters. Brill was also featured in episodes of The Guiding Light, All My Children, The Edge of Night, Lip Service and Kate and Allie.

In 1975, Brill portrayed first lady Rachel Jackson in First Ladies' Diaries on NBC-TV. She has also guest-starred on nighttime dramas such as Third Watch, Against the Law, Law & Order, and Law & Order: SVU.

She has one known animation credit when she guest starred as Elisa and Eliza Stitch in Courage the Cowardly Dog.

Brill had no experience as a puppeteer when she joined Sesame Street, for which she has won an Emmy Award, and created Prairie Dawn. She also created and puppeteered the Muppets Zoe, Little Bird, and Betty Lou, among others. Playing Zoe, Brill appeared on the TV-series The West Wing as well as many home videos including Zoe's Dance Moves. With the Muppets she did Saturday Night Live, The Muppet Show, The Jim Henson Hour, Dog City, and The Adventures of Elmo in Grouchland.

She has also made commercials, preferring to do voiceovers rather than appearing on-camera, and has appeared in such films as Being There, What About Bob?, Midnight Run, and City Hall.

In 2014, Brill announced that she was retiring from puppeteering on Sesame Street.

== Filmography ==
- Sesame Street (1970-2014)
- Being There (1979)
- The Muppets Take Manhattan (1984)
- Old Enough (1984)
- Seize the Day (1986)
- Midnight Run (1988)
- What About Bob? (1991)
- Billy Bunny's Animal Songs (1993)
- Nick Jr. Channel (as Jam in "Little Big Room" segments)
- City Hall (1996)
- Elmo's World (1998-2009)
- Doug's 1st Movie (1999)
- The Adventures of Elmo in Grouchland (1999)
