= Martin P. Robinson =

American puppeteer

- Born: Dearborn, Michigan, U.S.
- Other names: Marty Robinson, Martin Robinson
- Education: American Academy of Dramatic Arts
- Occupation: Puppeteer
- Years active: 1980–present
- Spouse: Annie Evans (m. 2008)
- Children: 5
- Website: http://www.martinprobinson.com/

Martin P. Robinson is an American puppeteer, best known for his work on Sesame Street, having performed the characters of Telly Monster, Mr. Snuffleupagus, Slimey, Irvine, Buster the Horse, and Shelley the Turtle. He performed the characters Riff the Cat and Clef on Allegra's Window, and was an animatronic puppeteer for Leonardo in Teenage Mutant Ninja Turtles.

== Early life ==
Robinson's father was a hydraulics engineer and his mother was a teacher. He grew up in Milwaukee and graduated from Brookfield East High School in Brookfield, Wisconsin, a suburb of Milwaukee. He graduated from the American Academy of Dramatic Arts in 1974.

Robinson originally intended to become a character actor, but work was scarce. He later toured with a marionette company, eventually working under puppeteer Bil Baird.

== Personal life ==
Robinson married Sesame Street writer Annie Evans on August 9, 2008, on the set of Sesame Street in the Kaufman Astoria Studios in Queens, New York. Evans gave birth to twin daughters on February 12, 2009. Robinson also has three children from a previous marriage and two grandchildren. He and his family live in Redding, Connecticut.

== Filmography ==
=== Film ===
Year	Production	Role	Notes
1984	The Muppets Take Manhattan	Swedish Chef (hands), Buster the Horse, additional Muppets	Performer
1985	Sesame Street Presents: Follow That Bird	Telly Monster, Mr. Snuffleupagus, Board of Birds Member, Grouch Diner Patron, additional Muppets	Performer
1990	Teenage Mutant Ninja Turtles	Leonardo	Facial assistant
1999	The Adventures of Elmo in Grouchland	Telly Monster, Laundromat Manager, Little Ricky	Performer
2008	A Muppets Christmas: Letters to Santa	Crazy Harry, additional Muppets	Performer, voice

=== Television ===
Year(s)	Production	Role	Notes
1981–present	Sesame Street	Telly Monster (1984–present), Mr. Snuffleupagus (1981–present), Slimey the Worm, Buster the Horse, Irvine, Mrs. Grouch, Dicky Tick, Vincent Twice, Old MacDonald, Freddy, additional Muppets	Performer
1983	Don't Eat the Pictures	Mr. Snuffleupagus	Performer; television special
1985	Little Muppet Monsters	Rat, Cow, Walrus, additional Muppets	Performer
1986	The Muppets: A Celebration of 30 Years	Telly Monster	Performer (uncredited); television special
1986	The Tale of the Bunny Picnic	Farmer, additional Muppets	Performer; television special
1987	A Muppet Family Christmas	Additional Muppets	Performer; television special
1988	The Transformers	Powermaster Optimus Prime	Puppeteer (season 5)
1990	The Muppets Celebrate Jim Henson	Telly Monster, additional Muppets	Performer; television special
1994–1996	Allegra's Window	Riff, Clef	Voice, performer
1996	Elmo Saves Christmas	Telly Monster, Mr. Snuffleupagus, Santa's Elf, additional Muppets	Performer; television special
1998	The Wubbulous World of Dr. Seuss	The Cat in the Hat	Performer (season 2)
2002	Between the Lions	Grandpa Lion	Performer, episode: "Out in Outer Space"
2009, 2013	Late Night with Jimmy Fallon	Mr. Snuffleupagus, additional Muppets	Performer; 2 episodes
2013	Good Morning America	Telly Monster	Performer; 1 episode
2015	Saturday Night Live	Mr. Snuffleupagus	Voice (uncredited)
2019–2023	Helpsters	Mr. Primm	Performer
2020	The Not-Too-Late Show with Elmo	Telly Monster, Freddy	Performer
2021	Law & Order: Organized Crime	Octopus	Puppeteer #1; 1 episode
2026	The Muppet Show	Supporting Muppet Performer	ABC/Disney+ special

=== Video games ===
Year(s)	Title	Role	Notes
1994	Sesame Street: Numbers	Telly Monster, Mr. Snuffleupagus	Voice role
1996	Get Set to Learn!	Telly Monster, Martian	Voice role
1998	The Three Grouchketeers	Telly Monster	Voice role
2001	Sesame Street: Sports	Telly Monster	Voice role
2001	Sesame Street: Letters	Telly Monster, Mr. Snuffleupagus	Voice role
2011	Sesame Street: Once Upon a Monster	Slimey the Worm	Voice role
2012	Kinect Sesame Street TV	Telly Monster, Mr. Snuffleupagus, Martian	Voice role

=== Other appearances ===
Year(s)	Production	Role	Notes
1981	Muppet Meeting Films	Papa Luigi	Short film
1982, 2003	Little Shop of Horrors	Audrey II	Puppeteer in the original 1982 off-Broadway and 2003 Broadway productions
1988	Jim Henson's Play-Along Video	Crocodile, Raccoon, additional Muppets	Performer; direct-to-video series
2003	Sesame Street 4-D Movie Magic	Telly Monster	Performer, theme park film

== See also ==
- List of Sesame Street puppeteers
