= List of Sesame Street Muppets =

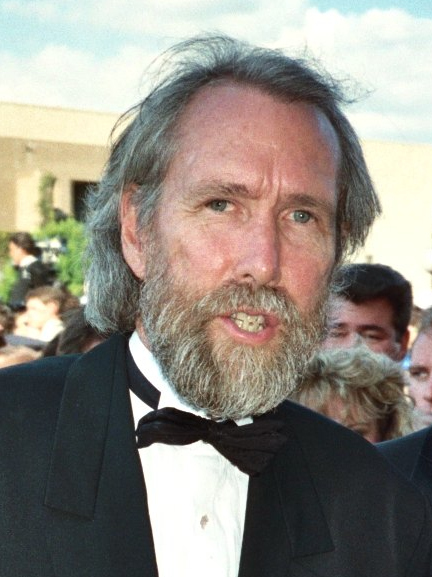
Jim Henson, creator of The Muppets (seen here at the 41st Primetime Emmy Awards 8 months before his death), was initially reluctant to work on Sesame Street, but joined due to social concerns of the time.

The Sesame Street Muppets are a group of puppet characters created by Jim Henson, many for the purpose of appearing on the children's television program Sesame Street. Henson's involvement in Sesame Street began when he and Joan Ganz Cooney, one of the creators of the show, met in the summer of 1968, at one of the show's five three-day curriculum planning seminars in Boston. Author Christopher Finch reported that director Jon Stone, who had worked with Henson previously, felt that if they could not bring him on board, they should "make do without puppets".

Henson was originally reluctant but agreed to join Sesame Street in support of its social goals. He also agreed to waive his performance fee for full ownership of the Sesame Street Muppets and to split any revenue they generated with the Children's Television Workshop (renamed to Sesame Workshop on June 5, 2000), the series' non-profit producer. The Muppets were a crucial part of the show's popularity, and brought Henson national attention. The Muppet segments of the show were popular since its premiere, and more Muppets were added during the first few seasons. The Muppets were effective teaching tools because children easily recognized them, they were predictable, and they appealed to adults and older siblings.

During the production of Sesame Street's first season, producers created five one-hour episodes to test the show's appeal to children and examine their comprehension of the material. Not intended for broadcast, they were presented to preschoolers in 60 homes throughout Philadelphia and in day care centers in New York City in July 1969. The results were "generally very positive"; children learned from the shows, their appeal was high, and children's attention was sustained over the full hour. However, the researchers found that although children's attention was high during the Muppet segments, their interest wavered during the "Street" segments, when no Muppets were on screen. This was because the producers had followed the advice of child psychologists who were concerned that children would be confused if human actors and Muppets were shown together. As a result of this decision, the appeal of the test episodes was lower than the target.

The Street scenes were "the glue" that "pulled the show together", so producers knew they needed to make significant changes. The producers decided to reject the advisers' advice and reshot the Street segments; Henson and his coworkers created Muppets that could interact with the human actors, specifically Oscar the Grouch and Big Bird, who became two of the show's most enduring characters. These test episodes were directly responsible for what Canadian writer Malcolm Gladwell called "the essence of Sesame Street—the artful blend of fluffy monsters and earnest adults". Since 2001, the full rights for the Muppets created for Sesame Street (which do not include Kermit the Frog) have been owned by Sesame Workshop; Sesame continues to license the trademarked term "Muppet" from The Muppets Studio for their characters.

== Muppets ==
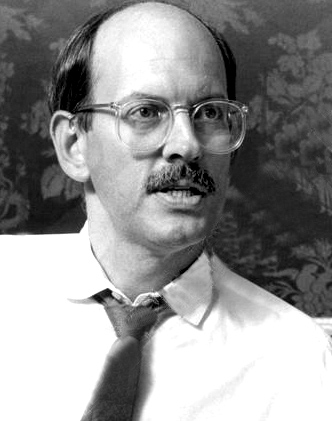
Frank Oz, who performed many Muppets throughout his career, from the debut of Sesame Street to most Henson productions

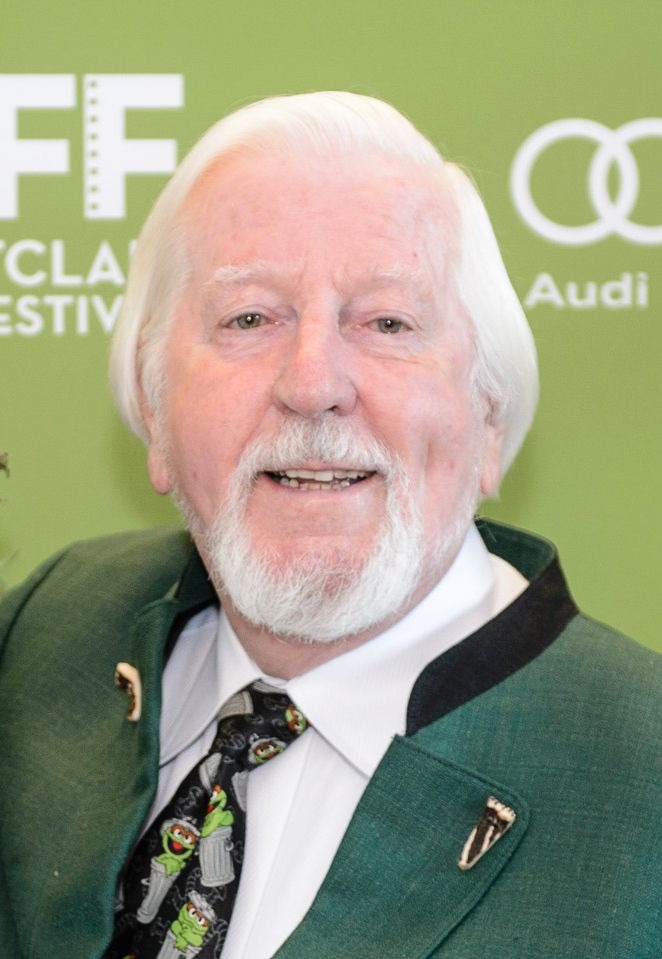
Caroll Spinney performed Big Bird and Oscar the Grouch from the show's debut in 1969 until his retirement in 2018

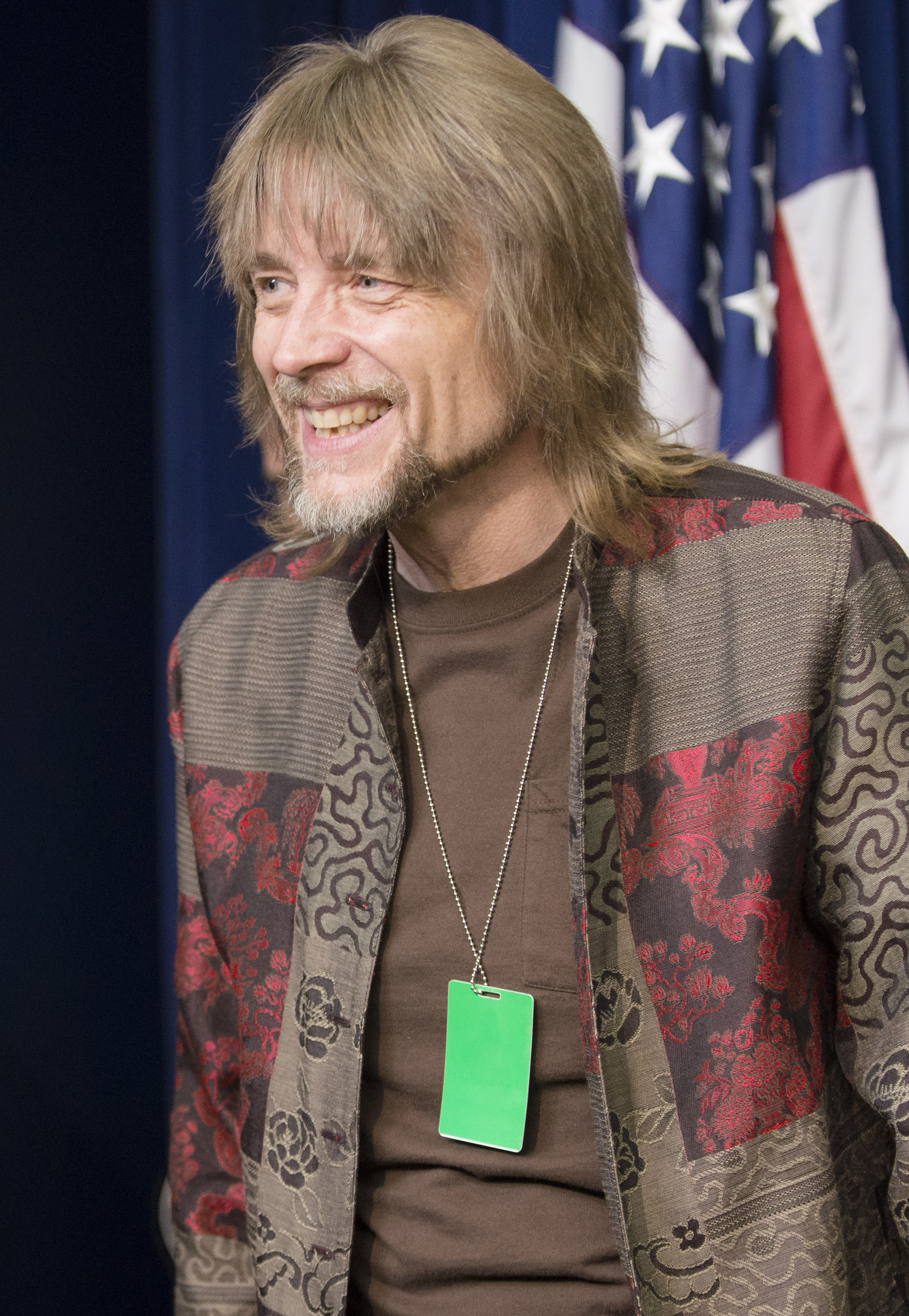
Steve Whitmire, who took over many of Jim Henson's characters after Henson's death in 1990, including Ernie and Kermit the Frog

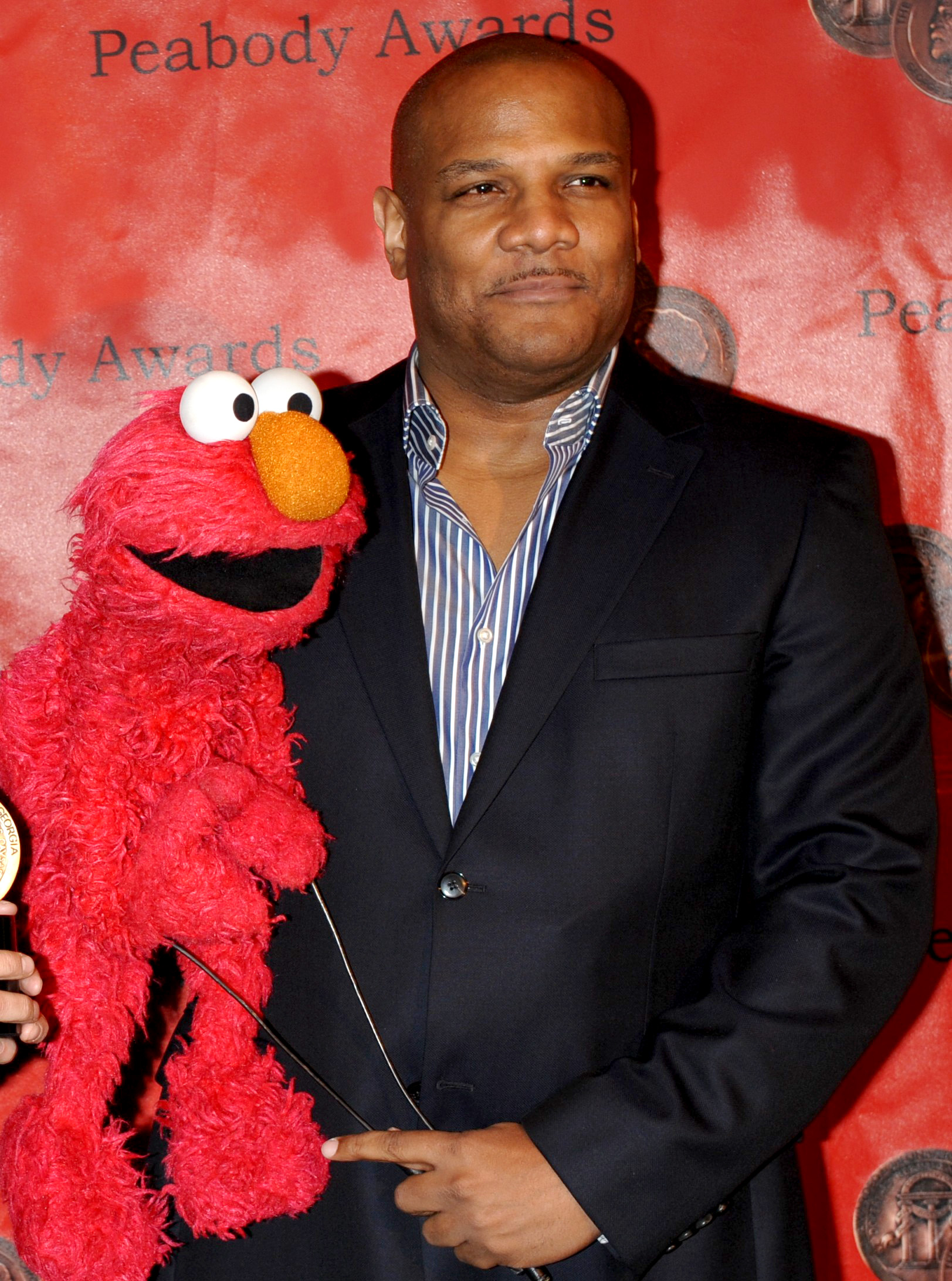
Kevin Clash, with Elmo, his most famous puppet, whom he performed from 1985 to 2012

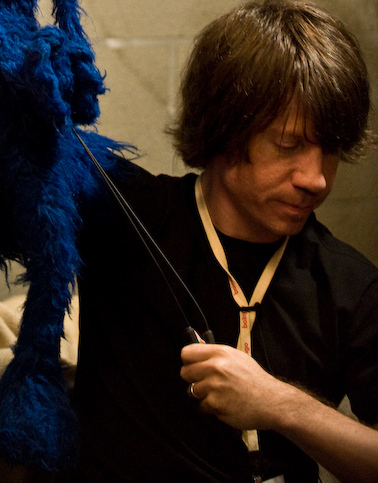
Eric Jacobson (2015), pictured here performing Grover

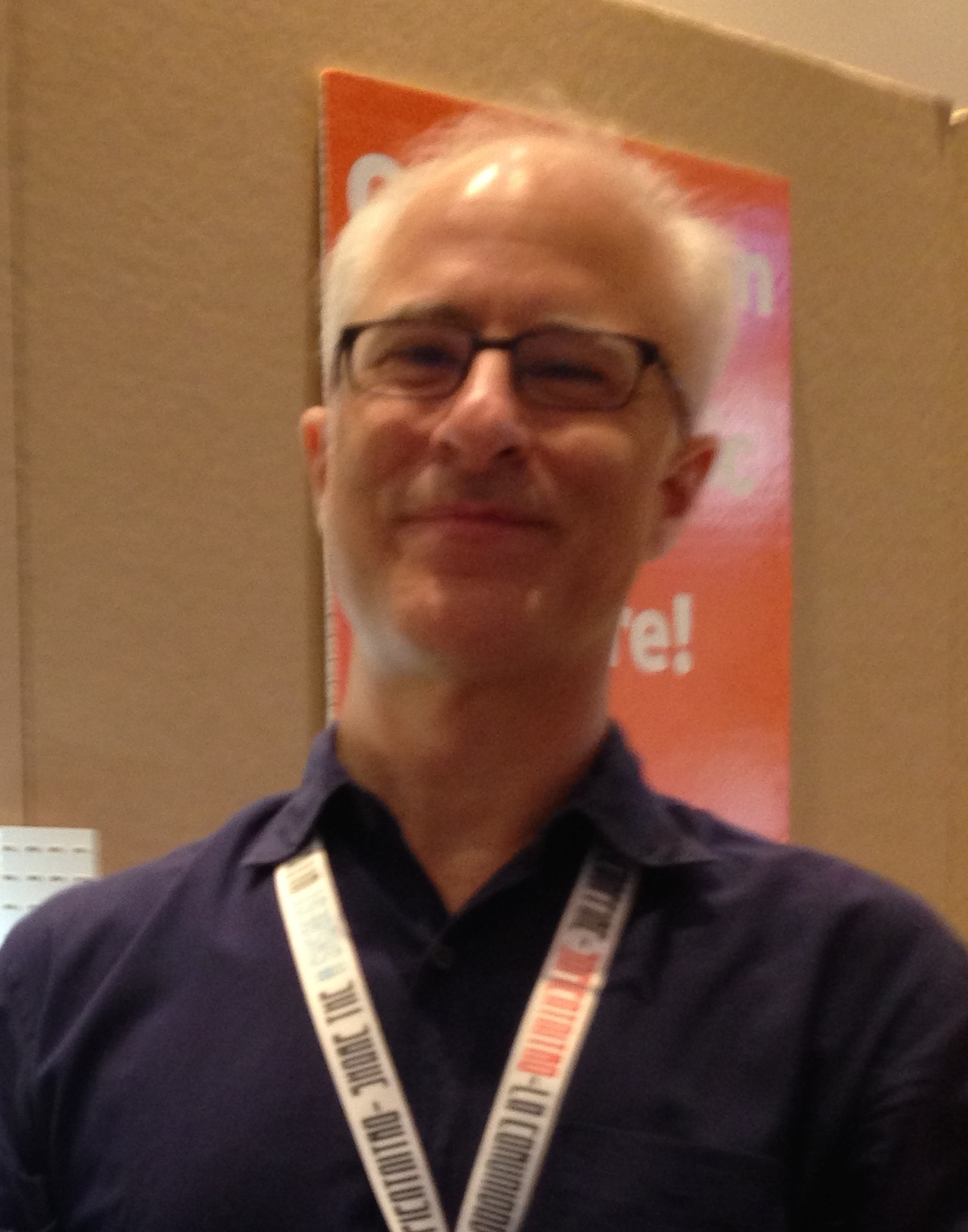
David Rudman (2015), who performs Baby Bear, Cookie Monster, and the Two-Headed Monster

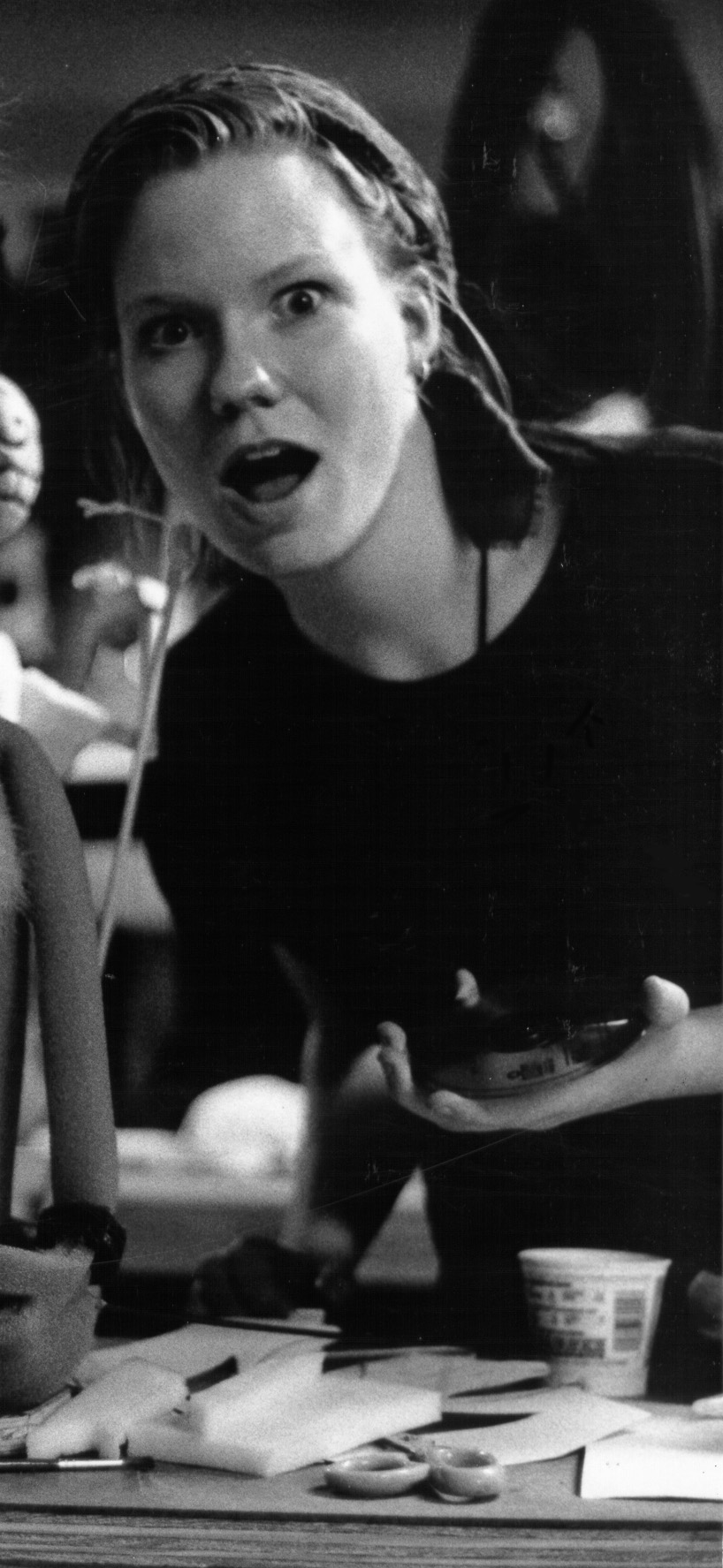
Jennifer Barnhart, who performed Gladys the Cow and Mama Bear, and also currently performs Zoe

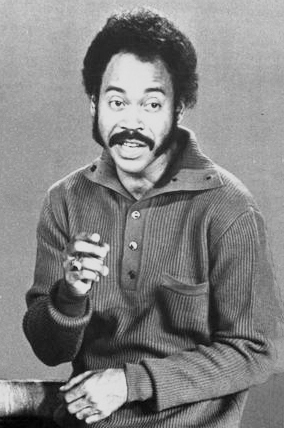
Matt Robinson, who in addition to performing the voice of the character Roosevelt Franklin, played Gordon for the first 3 seasons of Sesame Street

Character	Actor/Muppet performer	Description
Abby Cadabby	Leslie Carrara-Rudolph	Abby is a 4-year-old fairy-in-training with tiny wings, a magic wand and sparkles in her hair. She was created to increase the number of the female Sesame Street Muppets. Daughter of the fairy godmother, she "has her own point of view and is comfortable with the fact that she likes wearing a dress".
Alice Snuffleupagus	Judy Sladky	Alice is the baby sister of Aloysius Snuffleupagus ("Snuffy"). She was one of the first Muppets controlled by remote control.
Alistair Cookie	Frank Oz	Played by Cookie Monster, he is a parody of British broadcaster Alistair Cooke and appears in the "Monsterpiece Theater" sketch (a parody of Masterpiece Theatre). At first, he used a tobacco pipe that he would eat in each segment. The pipe was eventually removed because according to executive producer Carol-Lynn Parente, it "modeled... wrong behavior".
The Amazing Mumford	Jerry Nelson, John Kennedy	The Amazing Mumford is a "W.C. Fields-esque" magician whose magic tricks often go awry. His catchphrase, used to produce his tricks, is "À la peanut butter sandwiches".
Anything Muppets	Various	Writer Christopher Finch called Anything Muppets "unadorned puppet torsos and heads" used for a single role or purpose. This ever-expanding troupe of Muppets comes in all shapes, sizes and appearances. The Anything Muppets portray humans, specific animals and occasional aliens.
AM Monsters	Various	Short for "Anything Muppet Monsters", the AM Monsters are customizable Muppet Monsters like the Anything Muppets and the Whatnots from The Muppet Show. Like the Anything Muppets, the AM Muppets come in all shapes, sizes and appearances. According to writer Louise Gikow, Elmo started out as an AM Monster.
Aristotle	Richard Hunt	Aristotle is a blind monster created to increase inclusiveness of people and puppets with disabilities on the show. He was designed by Michael K. Frith and built by Ed Christie.
Arlene Frantic	Fran Brill	Arlene appeared in the Sesame Street sketch "What's My Part". She was a parody of actress Arlene Francis.
Baby Bear	David Rudman	Baby Bear, "borrowed from the enduring 'The Three Bears' story", is Curly Bear's big brother and Telly Monster's best friend.
Barkley	Toby Towson (1978), Fred Garbo, Brian Muehl, Bruce Connelly	Barkley was originally named "Woof-Woof", he is a "large, friendly, shaggy dog" owned by Linda and knows a few words in American Sign Language. Barkley appeared in the 1983 TV special Big Bird in China.
Beautiful Day Monster	Jim Henson, Frank Oz, Caroll Spinney	Beautiful Day Monster originally appeared on The Ed Sullivan Show. This puppet was used interchangeably with Cookie Monster on the first season of Sesame Street. He was portrayed as the main antagonist of Sesame Street as he loved to steal things and had sharp teeth. The character was axed from the show because of how he made a terrifying B sound "BAAAAAH!", and how he loved scaring people.
Bennett Snerf	Jerry Nelson (AM Monster version), Caroll Spinney (Anything Muppet version)	Bennett Snerf appeared in the Sesame Street sketches "What's My Part". He was a parody of American publisher Bennett Cerf.
Benny	Kevin Clash	Benny is a cynical and cantankerous rabbit who worked as a bellhop at the Furry Arms Hotel (which was part of the Around-the-Corner set expansion of the 1990s).
Bert	Frank Oz (1969–2006), Eric Jacobson (1997–present)	Bert is Ernie's best friend. He collects paperclips and bottle caps, is fond of oatmeal and is fascinated by pigeons. His sketches were made by Henson and he was built by Don Sahlin.
Betty Lou	Lisa Buckley	Borgenicht says about her: "With her blonde braided hair, [she] is friendly and unassuming".
Biff	Jerry Nelson, Matt Vogel (2020–present)	Biff is an "Archie Bunker-style blue-collar loudmouth". He and his partner Sully made for a "classic comedy team". Whenever they encounter a problem, Biff often asks for Sully's opinion, but interrupts him before Sully can answer; however, it is Sully who inevitably comes up with the solution.
Big Bird	Caroll Spinney (1969–2018), Matt Vogel (1997–present)	Standing at eight feet two inches, Big Bird was designed by Don Sahlin from Jim Henson's sketches and built by Kermit Love. It was Spinney's idea to make Big Bird a child, with "his trademark curiosity and innocence".
Bip Bippadotta	Jim Henson, John Kennedy	Bip is the wild-haired puppet featured in the Muppet segment "Mah Nà Mah Nà".
Bruno	Caroll Spinney	Bruno is a trashman who sometimes carries Oscar's trash can around the Street. Spinney designed Bruno as a way to allow Oscar to move around and talk at the same time. Spinney also had roller skates made so he could skate around the stage while performing Bruno and Oscar.
Buster	Martin P. Robinson	Buster is Forgetful Jones' horse with a southern Texas accent who often helps Forgetful get out of difficulties and remember things.
Captain Vegetable	Jim Henson (1982), Richard Hunt (1983–1984), Peter Linz (2019–present)	Captain Vegetable is a superhero who fought for healthy vegetables. His insignia was a carrot.
Clementine	Brian Muehl (1980–1984), Kevin Clash, Camille Bonora (voice)	Forgetful Jones' girlfriend
Colambo	Joey Mazzarino	A lamb detective who is inspired by Columbo
Cookie Monster	Frank Oz (1969–2004), David Rudman (2001–present)	According to Sesame Workshop, "Cookie Monster is a frenzied yet cuddly character on a persistent quest for more food...especially cookies!"
Count von Count	Jerry Nelson (1972–2012), Matt Vogel (2013–present)	The Count is a number-obsessed vampire who craves counting with a single-focused passion. Nelson based the Count's character and exaggerated European accent on Bela Lugosi's Count Dracula.
Countess Dahling von Dahling	Fran Brill (1980–1984)	The Countess is Count von Count's girlfriend. She has a dog named Masha and is modeled after Marlene Dietrich.
Curly Bear	Stephanie D'Abruzzo	Curly is Baby Bear's little sister. Created to address the issue of sibling rivalry, Curly calls her brother "Bebo", has a very loud growl, and unlike the rest of her family, does not like porridge.
Deena	Karen Prell	Deena is a young, energetic pinkish-purple monster with red hair and wild rolling eyes, speaks in the third person. Described as "hyperactive", Prell reported that her performance was deemed "over-the-top", so the character did not last long.
Dexter	Kevin Clash	A purple tall monster who loves to juggle
Dingers	Various	Like the Honkers, the Dingers communicate only with dings.
Don Music	Richard Hunt, Ryan Dillon (2019–present)	Don Music is a piano-playing composer who required assistance from Kermit the Frog to complete the lyrics to his songs. Whenever he got frustrated, he would say, "Oh, I'll never get it right! Never, never, never!" and bang his head on the piano. He had a bust of Ludwig van Beethoven on his piano and, as an inside joke, a framed photo of Joe Raposo hanging on the wall.
Donald/Ronald Grump	Martin P. Robinson	According to The Washington Post, New York businessman and eventual President of the United States Donald Trump has been parodied by Sesame Street three times, depicted as a grouch like Oscar. The first time was in the late 1980s; Ronald Grump, a Muppet wearing a fedora attempts to con Oscar out of his trash can. Actor Joe Pesci played Ronald Grump in 1994, during the show's 25th anniversary. In 2005, Donald Grump, a Muppet with an orange wig, appeared in a parody of Trump's TV show The Apprentice.
Dr. Feel	Steve Whitmire	A spoof of TV personality and author Dr. Phil McGraw
Dr. Nobel Price	Brian Muehl (1980–1984), Kevin Clash (1984–1988)	Price's inventions consist solely of things that were either useless (like a flying cupcake) or had already been invented. Author Louise Gikow called Price a "misguided inventor" and the "bane of reporter Kermit's existence."
Elizabeth	Stephanie D'Abruzzo	Elizabeth is a pig-tailed Muppet with a Brooklyn accent who loves the number 732 and her cat Little Murray Sparkles. D'Abruzzo said about her: "She was unlike your typical little girl characters".
Elmo	Brian Muehl (1980–1984), Richard Hunt (1984–1985), Kevin Clash (1985–2012), Ryan Dillon (2013–present)	Sesame Workshop calls Elmo "a 3½-year-old red monster with a distinctive cheerful voice and a contagious giggle" and "Enthusiastic, friendly, and curious".
Elijah	Christopher Hayes	The father of Wes and married to Naomi, Elijah works as a meteorologist, as shown in a 2022 web video "Take Your Child to Work Day." According to press reports, he enjoys outdoor running, watching movies, and cooking with his family. He also played tennis with his friend Mike, who died of the COVID-19 pandemic.
Ernie	Jim Henson (1969–1990), Steve Whitmire (1993–2014), Peter Linz (2017–present)	Ernie is Bert's best friend, who is mischievous and free-spirited. He likes playing practical jokes on Bert, and loves playing musical instruments, singing, and "taking baths with Rubber Ducky".
Farley	Jerry Nelson	Farley is a green Muppet boy with short orange spiked hair and a yellow sweater.
Fatima	Carmen Osbahr (2002)	A purple bird who is from Paraguay and is Big Bird's special friend
Ferlinghetti Donizetti	Richard Hunt (1980–1984), Kevin Clash (1984–1986)	A blue poet and rapper who is named after poet Lawrence Ferlinghetti
Flo Bear	David Rudman	A bear writer whose name is a riff on French novelist Gustave Flaubert
Forgetful Jones	Michael Earl (1980–1981), Richard Hunt (1981–1992), Matt Vogel (2019–present)	A "simpleton cowboy" who always forgets everything
Frazzle	Jerry Nelson	A growling orange monster whose deceptively fierce visage hides a childlike personality and a desperate need to be included
Fred	Jerry Nelson	Fred is a wonder horse ridden by Grover and his "trusty companion". His "horse sense" is always better than Grover's and he "usually saves the day".
Gabrielle	Megan Piphus Peace (2020–present)	Gabrielle is a 6¾-years-old with a vibrant and curious personality. She enjoys singing, dancing, playing pretend, and going on nature walks with her friends Elmo, Abby Cadabby, Rosita and her cousin Tamir.
Gladys the Cow	Richard Hunt, Jennifer Barnhart	Gladys is a flirtatious bovine. With her "piercing operatic voice", she is "a theatrical ham (even though she's a cow)".
Granny Bird	Caroll Spinney (1969–2014); Jennifer Barnhart (2018–present)	Big Bird's grandmother
Mrs. Grouch	Martin P. Robinson	Oscar's mother
Gonger	Warrick Brownlow-Pike	Gonger is a fuchsia Muppet who works with Cookie Monster in his food truck. Gonger has "whiskers like friendly muttonchops", "an unusual accent and a background in hospitality". He originated on The Furchester Hotel, a co-production from the UK.
Granny Fanny Nestlerode	Caroll Spinney	An old lady Muppet
Grover	Frank Oz (1969–2012), Eric Jacobson (1998–present)	Finch calls Grover "an infinitely optimistic soul". Finch goes on to state that although Grover has a facility for self-deception, he is also honest and wise.
Grundgetta	Brian Muehl (1980–1984), Pam Arciero (1984–present)	Grundgetta is a grouch who is Oscar's "trashy girlfriend". She has Oscar's grouchy temperament and also likes everything trashy.
Gulliver	Joey Mazzarino	A seagull who is Big Bird's penpal
Guy Smiley	Jim Henson (1969–1990), Eric Jacobson (2005–present)	Gikow calls Guy "America's favorite game-show host".
H. Ross Parrot	Jerry Nelson	H. Ross Parrot promoted the importance of the alphabet. He is based on independent presidential candidate H. Ross Perot.
Harvey Kneeslapper	Frank Oz, Eric Jacobson	Harvey is a "one-joke character" which was dropped from the show because his "raucous laugh" was too hard on Oz's throat.
Herbert Birdsfoot	Jerry Nelson	A bespectacled Muppet who is a lecturer who often appeared with Grover
Herry Monster	Jerry Nelson, Martin P. Robinson, Peter Linz	According to Borgenicht, Herry is "fuzzy and blue, big and burly", with a "gentle side". He appears in many unscripted scenes with children.
Honkers	Various	Like the Dingers, they communicate only through honks.
Hoots	Kevin Clash, Christopher Hayes (2019–present)	Sesame Street writer Mark Saltzman described Hoots as "the saxophone-playing jazz owl". Clash based his voice after Louis Armstrong.
Horatio	Joey Mazzarino	A dancing African elephant
Humphrey	David Rudman	He and his wife Ingrid, who together are Natasha's parents, are the hotel managers of the Furry Arms Hotel which was part of the Around-the-Corner set from 1993 to 1998.
Ingrid	Joey Mazzarino	Ingrid is Natasha's mother. She and her husband Humphrey are the hotel managers of the Furry Arms Hotel.
Jamie Fox	Joey Mazzarino	Jamie Fox is a fox who, along with Elmo and actor Jamie Foxx, tries to figure out who is the real "Jamie Fox". They end up singing the alphabet together.
Ji-Young	Kathleen Kim (2021–)	Ji-Young is a seven-year-old Korean-American girl, who is passionate about skateboarding and "rocking out on her electric guitar." Ji-Young made history as Sesame Street's first Asian-American Muppet, who was introduced to the public during the show's Thanksgiving special, See Us Coming Together.
Julia	Stacey Gordon (2017–present)	Julia is a little girl with "green eyes and red hair and an artistic temperament" who is autistic.
Kermit the Frog	Jim Henson (1969–1990), Steve Whitmire (1996–2001, 2009), Matt Vogel (2019),	Kermit is a frog who is one of the first Muppets designed and built by Jim Henson. Borgenicht calls Kermit "funny, ironic, and always the voice of reason amidst the insanity around him; the calm in the eye of the storm". Gerald S. Lesser, CTW's first advisory board chairman, calls him "the saturnine but gentlemanly puppet frog". Sesame Workshop does not own the character, unlike most of the Muppets on this list.
Kingston Livingston III	Kevin Clash	Kingston is a young African-American Muppet who is smart, cool, and prefers to do his own thing.
Lefty	Frank Oz (1970–1975), Ryan Dillon (2019–present)	Lefty is a shady, green-skinned Muppet who tries to sell useless items to other characters (usually Ernie).
Leo	Richard Hunt	A loud and energetic monster who really loves to party, known as "the party monster"
Little Bird	Fran Brill, Stephanie D'Abruzzo (2019)	Little Bird is Big Bird's "little friend", who is "slightly wiser" than Big Bird.
Little Chrissy	Jim Henson (puppeteer), Christopher Cerf (voice)	Little Chrissy is the lead singer of "Little Chrissy and the Alphabeats". He was one of the earliest Muppets based upon an actual person (Cerf).
Little Jerry	Jerry Nelson	Little Jerry is a green Muppet who is the lead singer of the rock group "Little Jerry and the Monotones". Many of their songs were written by Jeff Moss.
Little Murray Sparkles	Alice Dinnean, Stephanie D'Abruzzo	Elizabeth's beloved pet cat
Liz	Stephanie D'Abruzzo	Liz is a lemon who is a parody of Tina Fey's 30 Rock character of the same name.
Louie	Bill Barretta (2006–2010), Tyler Bunch (2010–present)	Elmo's dad and husband to Mae
Mama Bear	Jennifer Barnhart	Mama Bear is Baby Bear and Curly Bear's mother and Papa Bear's wife.
The Martians	Jim Henson, Jerry Nelson, Martin P. Robinson	Martians, or "Yip Yips", have a jellyfish-like appearance and speak in a simple mixture of Martian ("yip" and "nope") and English.
Merry Monster	Joey Mazzarino	A yellow female monster who likes to scare people just for fun
Meryl Sheep	Camille Bonora	Meryl is a sheep with a vaguely European accent who has brunette or sometimes blonde hair. She is a parody of Meryl Streep.
Monty	Martin P. Robinson	Muppet-homage to Monty Python's Flying Circus
Mr. Johnson	Jerry Nelson (1971–2012), Matt Vogel (2013–present)	Also called "Fat Blue", Mr. Johnson usually appears with Grover in restaurant skits as his harried customer (and usually at Charlie's Restaurant).
Murray Monster	Joey Mazzarino	Murray is the host of the "Word on the Street" segment. He is a boisterous, red-orange Muppet.
Natasha	Kevin Clash	Natasha is an infant monster who uses only baby-talk to communicate. Natasha's parents are Humphrey and Ingrid.
Oscar the Grouch	Caroll Spinney (1969–2018), Eric Jacobson (2015–present)	One of the first Muppets created for Sesame Street and a "surprising success", Oscar gives kids "permission to feel grouchy—and to demonstrate differing opinions", as well as serving as a model for lessons in how to adapt to different personalities. Spinney based his voice on a New York City cab driver that he encountered.
Ovejita (2008)	Carmen Osbahr	Ovejita is a little lamb. Ovejita accompanies Murray to various schools in the segment "Murray Had a Little Lamb".
Papa Bear	Joey Mazzarino	Baby Bear and Curly Bear's father, and Mama Bear's husband
Placido Flamingo	Richard Hunt	An "opera star" who often sang with his human counterpart, Placido Domingo
Poco Loco	Jerry Nelson, Michael Earl	Poco Loco is a scarlet macaw who copies words and also repeats what Big Bird says. He retired in 1981, but his puppet was recycled from H. Ross Parrot, a parody of H. Ross Perot and Bolo in a 1999 episode.
Prairie Dawn	Fran Brill (1971–2015), Stephanie D'Abruzzo (2015–present)	A little girl whose psychological age is that of a precocious seven-year-old
Prince Charming	Frank Oz	Prince Charming is a Muppet who resembles "Guy Smiley in prince's clothing", he is the "self-involved" prince who appears in Muppet fairy tales.
Professor Hastings	Frank Oz	Hastings is a professor whose lectures were so dull that he would fall asleep himself while giving them. According to Borgenicht, he was eventually cut from the Muppet cast because "he was, well, too dull."
Rodeo Rosie	Jerry Nelson	A cowgirl who brags a lot
Roosevelt Franklin	Matt Robinson (voice), Chris Knowings (voice, 2019–present)	Roosevelt is an African-American Muppet who attended Roosevelt Franklin Elementary School, played headball at Roosevelt Franklin Stadium and was so popular that he recorded his own album. He was dropped from the show because "he was thought by some to be a negative cultural stereotype".
Roosevelt Franklin's Mother	Loretta Long (voice)	The mother of Roosevelt Franklin
Rosita	Carmen Osbahr (1991–present)	Rosita is a playful and optimistic turquoise 5-year-old monster from Mexico. She knows both English and Spanish, and likes to share her heritage with her friends and teach them Spanish words. She also likes singing and playing the guitar.
Rowlf the Dog	Jim Henson	Originally created for Purina Dog Chow commercials in 1962, Rowlf became a household name as a series regular on The Jimmy Dean Show. He appeared alongside Kermit the Frog in the 1968 Sesame Street pitch reel, where he played the role of an enthusiastic supporter of the show's educational potential. Despite his fame, he only made a single cameo appearance during the first season in a filmed segment for the "Song of Nine" and was never a part of the show's regular cast.
Roxie Marie	Fran Brill	A construction worker and is Biff's niece
Ruby	Camille Bonora	A female Muppet monster scientist and inventor
Rudy	Frankie Cordero (2017–present)	Abby's stepbrother
SAM	Jerry Nelson	A robot who is supposedly perfect, SAM is prone to silly mistakes. His name is an acronym for "Super Automated Machine".
Segi (2010)	Chantylla Johnson (voice)	Segi is inspired by head writer and puppeteer Joey Mazzarino's adopted daughter. She first appeared in the sketch in which she sang, "I Love My Hair"; according to writer Kathy Russell-Cole and her colleagues, after it was posted online, the response was "nearly overwhelming" and went viral.
Sherlock Hemlock	Jerry Nelson, Matt Vogel	A parody based on Basil Rathbone's movie portrayal of Sherlock Holmes, Hemlock solves mysteries by "concentrating on the little clues and overlooking the big ones" that his dog Watson tends to find.
Sherry Netherland	Alice Dinnean	Sherry is the "Leona Helmsley of the Furry Arms Hotel". She rules with "an iron fist, a heart of gold, and a brain of oatmeal".
Simon Soundman	Jerry Nelson	A blue Muppet who uses sounds to communicate
Slimey	Jerry Nelson (1970–1978), Michael Earl Davis (1978–1980), Martin P. Robinson (1980–present), Dick Maitland (voice)	According to Gikow, Slimey is an "intelligent worm" who is the smallest and, other than Buster, the smartest character on Sesame Street. When he first appeared, he spoke in just squeaky sounds. He later became the only Muppet to not be voiced by a puppeteer.
Smartie (2017)	Deborah Grausman	Smartie is an animated yellow phone and Elmo's sidekick. Her catchphrase is "Look it up."
Mr. Snuffleupagus ("Snuffy")	Jerry Nelson (1971–1978), Michael Earl Davis (1978–1981), Martin P. Robinson (1980–present)	Snuffy is a "large and friendly monster resembling an anteater" and Big Bird's best friend. At first, Snuffy was Big Bird's imaginary friend and never seen by his friends, but in 1985, the producers decided to reveal him as real to teach children that their perceptions could be trusted.
Sonny Friendly	Richard Hunt, David Rudman	Sesame Street Unpaved calls Sonny "America's Friendliest Game Show Host".
The Squirelles	Lillias White, Julianne Buescher, Lisa Buckley, Pam Arciero, Alice Dinnean	A parody of the 1960s R&B group The Shirelles
The Oinker Sisters	Ivy Austin, Tawatha Agee, Angela Cappelli, Kevin Clash, Fran Brill	A parody of the Pointer Sisters
Stinky	Joey Mazzarino	A talking stinkweed plant
Sully	Richard Hunt (1973–1992), David Rudman (1992–1999)	Sully is a construction worker and Biff's silent counterpart. He nevertheless served as the real brains of the duo. He is considered one of Hunt's most "understated and complex" characters.
Tango	Leslie Carrara-Rudolph	Tango is Elmo's puppy. The puppy made her debut in the 2021 animated Sesame Street special Furry Friends Forever: Elmo Gets a Puppy; a puppet version was created for use in promotion for the special and in Season 52. She also stars in the recurring animated segment "Elmo & Tango's Mysterious Mysteries". She is named Tango because she loves to dance. In the animated 2022 holiday special The Nutcracker: Starring Elmo & Tango, Tango gains the ability to speak in a dream sequence with a voice provided by Royina Patel.
Tamir	Tau Bennett (2020–2022), Bradley Freeman Jr. (2021–present)	An 8-year-old boy who is Gabrielle's cousin
Telly Monster	Bob Payne (1979), Brian Muehl (1979–1984, 1993-present), Martin P. Robinson (1984-present)	According to Sesame Workshop, "Telly Monster is an intense and earnest monster who worries over everything". His favorite shape is the triangle and his best friend is Baby Bear.
The Twiddlebugs	Jim Henson, Frank Oz, Jerry Nelson, Richard Hunt	A family of fuzzy insects (Thomas, Tessie and their children Timmy and Tina) who live in a milk carton among the flowers in Ernie's window box
The Two-Headed Monster	Left Head: Jerry Nelson; Right Head: Richard Hunt, Left Head: Joey Mazzarino (2001–2016), Eric Jacobson (2016–present); Right Head: David Rudman (1998–present)	A purple monster with two heads, who generally speaks in gibberish but has a baby-like vocabulary; it teaches viewers about cooperation
Wes	Bradley Freeman Jr.	Wes is a young Muppet boy introduced in 2021 for Sesame Street's "Coming Together" outreach initiative regarding racism. His first appearances include a pair of videos for the Sesame Street in Communities "Racial Justice" topic, including the music video "I Am Somebody (Giant)". Wes is described in press reports as being five years old and loves to go to school and play pretend. He resides with his father Elijah and mother Naomi.
Zoe	Fran Brill (1993–2015), Jennifer Barnhart (2016–present)	Introduced to increase the number of strong female Sesame Street Muppets, Zoe is an orange 3-year-old Muppet who loves to sing and dance, and her best friend is Elmo. She is strong-willed, confident, has a big imagination, and owns a pet rock named Rocco.

== See also ==
- List of human Sesame Street characters
- List of Muppets
