= List of songs from Sesame Street =

This is a list of songs from Sesame Street. It includes the songs are written for used on the TV series. They have a variety of styles, including R&B, opera, show tunes, folk, and world music. Especially in the earlier decades, parodies and spoofs of popular songs were common, although that has reduced in more recent years.

Many famous musicians have sung on the show. They were chosen for their skill and popularity, but also for having a public perception that was compatible with the show's values. For example, musicians who were associated with illegal drugs were not invited to perform.

The songs' lyrics had to be wholesome. They could not suggest sexual activity or dangerous actions, such as leaning out of a window.

== List of songs ==
People contributing significant numbers of songs to the show include Joe Raposo, Christopher Cerf, Jeff Moss, and Al Jarnow.

Song	Sung by	Written by	Episode	Notes
"1234"	Feist		#4161	a version of her 2007 song
"14 Carrot Love"	Polly Darton and Benny Rabbit	Nancy Sans (lyrics) and Cheryl Hardwick (music)	#2811	
"A Baby's Life"	Anything Muppets		#1423	
"'A' You're Adorable"	Jack (Jim Henson)	Buddy Kaye and Fred Wise (lyrics) and Sidney Lippman (music)	#23	
"A Little Bit"	Joe Raposo	Joe Raposo (lyrics and music)	#160	
"A New Way to Walk"	The Oinker Sisters, later by Destiny's Child	Mark Saltzman (lyrics) and Joe Raposo (music)	#2268	
"A Very Simple Dance"	originally sung in audio track by David (Northern Calloway) in Bert & Ernie Sing-Along, later sung by Mike (Ward Saxton) and the kids	Carol Hall (lyrics) and Sam Pottle (music)	#737	
"ABC-DEF-GHI"	Big Bird (Caroll Spinney)	Jon Stone (lyrics) and Joe Raposo (music and lyrics)	#96	
"Adding"	Lavender Anything Muppet singer (Jerry Nelson)	Emily Kingsley (lyrics) and Jeff Moss (music)	#243	
"Adventure"	En Vogue	Christopher Cerf (lyrics)	#2951	
"African Alphabet"	Ladysmith Black Mambazo, Paul Simon, and Kermit the Frog (Jim Henson)	Joe Raposo (lyrics)	#2360	
"African Animal Alphabet"		Sarah Durkee (lyrics) and Paul Jacobs (music)	#3396	
"Ah, For the Joys of the Countryside"	a nature-loving baritone (Jim Henson)	David Axlerod (lyrics) and Sam Pottle (music)	#1008	
"The Alligator King"	Bud Luckey	Don Hadley (lyrics), Turk Murphy (music), and Bud Luckey (music)	#411	Later sung by Jerry Nelson and Richard Hunt
"Air"	Bip Bippadotta (Jim Henson), (Martin P. Robinson), (David Rudman), and (Richard Hunt)	Luis Santeiro (lyrics) and Joe Raposo (music)	#2568	
"Air"	Guy Smiley (Jim Henson)	Emily Kingsley (lyrics) and Christopher Cerf (music)	#2682	
"All by Myself"	Prairie Dawn and the Oinker Sisters (Fran Brill) with Soo-ey Oinker of the Oinker Sisters (Ivy Austin), (Angela Cappelli), and (Tawatha Agee)	Jeff Moss (lyrics)	#1824	
"Alone Song"	Big Bird	Sam Pottle (lyrics)	#921	
"Alphabet Jungle"		Dennis Scott (lyrics)	#2733	
"Alphabet Polka"	John Candy	Christopher Cerf and Norman Stiles (lyrics)	#2284	removed after a complaint about being insensitive to Polish people
"Amigo"	Carlos (Jerry Nelson), Betty Lou (Fran Brill), and other muppets about the Spanish word for friend	Carol Hall (lyrics)	#2042	
"Antarctica"	Two Anything Muppets (voiced by Paul Jacobs and Ivy Austin) and penguins	Emily Kingsley and Christopher Cerf (lyrics)	#2938	
"'B' is for Books"	Pharrell Williams	Questlove (lyrics)	#4626	
"'B' is for Bubble"			#8	Sung to the tune of "Three Blind Mice" and features kids blowing gum bubbles
"Baa Baa Bamba"	Luis (Emilio Delgado), the Muppet sheep, and other animals to the tune of "La Bamba"	Joe Raposo and Luis Santeiro	#2360	
"Baa Baa Black Sheep"	Telly and Three Sheep	Martin P. Robinson (lyrics)	Kids' Favorite Songs	
"Baby Say It Loud"	Gladys the Cow	Luis Santeiro (lyrics) and Dave Conner (music)	#2285	With Gordon, Susan, and the kids
"Baby Say it Loud"	Telly and Elmo	Luis Santeiro (lyrics) and Dave Conner (music)	#3611	Reworked from version in Episode 2285
"Baking a Cake"				Animated by Paul Fierlinger using the same stop-motion animation used on Teeny Little Super Guy
"Barn in the USA",	Bruce Stringbean (Christopher Cerf) and the Sesame Street Band, after "Born in the USA" by Bruce Springsteen and the E Street Band	Christopher Cerf and Emily Kingsley	#2991	
"The Batty Bat"	Count von Count, Abby Cadabby, Elmo and Ernie	Joe Raposo	#2096	
"Be Doodle Dee Dum"	Elmo	Jeff Moss	#3613	
"Be My D"	Didi O'Dey and the Dew Drops	Emily Kingsley (lyrics), Donald Alan Siegal (music), and Sam Pottle (music)	#1449	
"Beginning Middle and End"	Paul Jacobs to the tune of "And She Was" by Talking Heads	Sarah Durkee (lyrics) and Christopher Cerf (music)	#2556	Animated by Sally Cruikshank
"Bein' A Pig"	Joe Raposo over footage of pigs	Joe Raposo	#2356	
"Bein' Green"	Kermit the Frog (Jim Henson)	Joe Raposo	#87	Later covered by Frank Sinatra, Van Morrison, and others
"Believe in Yourself"	Diana Ross, The Neville Brothers, Ray Charles, NSYNC, and other artists during different episodes	Joe Raposo	#401	
"Benny Hop"	Benny Rabbit (Kevin Clash)		#3301	Included in Hot! Hot! Hot! Dance Songs
"Bert's Blanket"	The Muppet sheep (Jerry Nelson, Kevin Clash, and Ivy Austin) and Bert (Frank Oz) as they learn how the blanket is made from a sheep's wool	Christopher Cerf and Sara Compton	#2391	
"Best Friends"	Telly and Baby Bear		#3140	About a phone caller who criticizes Gina and (Savion Glover)'s friendship
"Between"	Jeff Redd		#2738	Later covered by Wayne Brady
"Big, Bigger, Biggest"		Christopher Cerf	#3731	
"Bingo"	Paul and Harper Simon		#1308	Accompanied by a short film on how vinyl records are made; later covered by the cast and the Honkers for the 1982 album Sing Along
"Black Eye Peas"		Graham Preskett	#917	Accompanied by a short film on how glass bottles get recycled
"Blue Nosed Gopher"		Graham Preskett	#972	Accompanied by a short film on how newspapers get recycled
"The Boogie-Woogie Piggies"	The Oinker Sisters	Tony Geiss	#2922	
"Bones (Inside of you)"	Count von Count (Jerry Nelson)	Jeff Moss	#1386	
"Born to Add"	Bruce Stringbean (Christopher Cerf) and the Sesame Street Band, after "Born to Run" by Bruce Springsteen and the E Street Band	Christopher Cerf	#1375	
"Bounce Back"	Lillian (Lillias White)			Animated by Paul Fierlinger using the same stop motion animation used on Teeny Little Super Guy
"Brothers and Sisters"	Stephanie D'Abruzzo and John Tartaglia	Tony Geiss	#4056	
"Brothers Song"	A boy	Philip Namanworth and Benjamin Goldstein	#1476	Sung in English and Spanish about a young boy bonding with his baby brother; rewritten version was sung by Lexine Bondoc, titled "Family Song"
"Brushing Down the Doggies"	Cecille		#2862	
"Budgie #10 Song"	Gene Barretta	Gene Barretta	#3526	
"But I Like You"	Bert and Ernie (Frank Oz and Jim Henson)	Jeff Moss	#1952	
"*C in Space"	Gene Barretta	Gene Barretta	#3729	
"C Is For Cookie"	Cookie Monster (Frank Oz)	Joe Raposo	#372	Original version directed by Jim Henson
"Calcutta Joe"	Jim Thurman	Jeff Hale and Anna Dibble	#2492	
"Can You Tell Me How to Get to Sesame Street?" (also known as "Sunny Day")	Joe Raposo, Jon Stone, and Bruce Hart.	Joe Raposo, Jon Stone, and Bruce Hart.	#1	
"Capital I"		Steve Zuckerman	#368	
"Captain Vegetable"	Captain Vegetable himself (Jim Henson)	Jeff Moss	#1741	
"Chapel Hat Pegs"	Haji Jones, Irish Mike, and Snuffy			
"Chopsticks"	Kevin Clash		#3270	sung by Kevin Clash with footage of people eating with chopsticks.
"Circles"	Herry and Cookie Monster	Jeff Moss	#131	
"City-Country Song"	cowgirl (Marilyn Sokol) and hipster (Jim Henson)	Sam Pottle (music) and Emily Kingsley (lyrics)	#681	
"Closer to Me"	Elmo	Joe Raposo (music) and David Korr (lyrics)	#2425	
"Clap Your Hands Game"	Gina, Susan, Bob, Luis, Maria, and Big Bird		Big Bird's Favorite Party Games	
"Comb Your Face"	monster (Richard Hunt)	Joe Raposo (music) and Sara Compton (lyrics)	#1851	
"Come Follow Me (To the Redwood Tree)"	Uncle Edgar the turtle and his nephews on Round singing.	Animated by Buzzco Associates	#2506	
"Cookie Disco"	Cookie Monster and three female backup vocalists parodying Isaac Hayes'	Christopher Cerf (lyrics) and Sam Pottle (music)	#1054	
"Cooperation Makes It Happen"	Anything Muppets		#1956	
"Count it Higher"	Little Chrissy (Christopher Cerf), with backup vocals by The Alphabeats (Richard Hunt, Jerry Nelson, and Jeff Moss)		#553	
"Count Me In"		Emily and Jason Kingsley, composed by Kenny Vaughn	#3738	
"Count Up to Nine"	Count von Count with Ftatateeta and the Bats in their castle	Sam Pottle and lyrics by David Axlerod	#1134	
"Count with me"	Ernie, Humphrey, Ingrid, Benny Rabbit, Sherry Netherland, and countless Muppets and kids		123 Count with Me	
"Counting Backwards in Spanish"	Count von Count and a group of backup singers	Christopher Cerf and lyrics by Emily Kingsley	#3370	
"Counting Crows 123"	counting crows (actual crows; a parody of the real-life band Counting Crows)		#3368	
"Counting is Wonderful"	Count von Count, Abby Cadabby (Leslie Carrara-Rudolph), Elmo and Ernie	music by Sam Pottle and lyrics by Emily Kingsley and David Axlerod.	#751	
"Counting Song (Learning to Count)"	Zoe and Celina (Annette Calud) Eva Maria Noblezada's aunt	written by David Korr (lyrics)	#3380	
"The Coconut Counting Man"	Harry Belafonte with Count von Count (Jerry Nelson)	Christopher Cerf	#1692	
"Cow Dog Song", ("I'm a hard-working dog")	Fred Wardenburg		#783	
"Crocodile Smiles Song"	an opera-singing crocodile about what you do with your teeth	Animated by Michael Sporn	#1731	
"Cry",	Baby Rocky (Jerry Nelson)	written by Sara Compton (lyrics) and Sam Pottle (music)	#1107	
"The Ballad of the S.S. Forgetful"	Uncle Wally (Bill McCutcheon)		#2130	

- "Daddy Dear" (The `D' Song) music by Bud Luckey, lyrics by Donald Hadley
- "Daddy Helps with the Dishes", sung by three Muppet families about how they help each other doing chores, cooking, and homework, written by Joe Raposo (music) and Luis Santeiro (lyrics).
- "Dance Myself To Sleep", sung by Ernie, joined by the boogie-woogie sheep while Bert complains to go back to sleep, written by Christopher Cerf and Norman Stiles. Later sung in two remakes, by a Sally Cruikshank animated lion in 1999 and Michael Jeter in 2000.
- "Danger's No Stranger", sung by How Now Brown (Christopher Cerf) and the Moo Wave, written by Christopher Cerf and Jon Stone.
- "Different Yet the Same", sung by Buster the Horse (Martin P. Robinson), Gladys the Cow (Richard Hunt), and two back-up horse singers, written by Joe Raposo (music) and Luis Santeiro (lyrics).
- "Ding, Ding Sing", sung by Benny Rabbit and Rosita. The ending is based on "It Don't Mean a Thing"
- "A Bark in the Dark"
- "Diner Letter P"
- "Diner Letter R"
- "Do De Rubber Duck" sung by Ernie (Jim Henson), Telly (Martin P. Robinson), Oscar (Caroll Spinney), Kermit the Frog (Jim Henson), Count von Count (Jerry Nelson), Biff (Jerry Nelson), Guy Smiley (Jim Henson), Gladys the Cow (Richard Hunt), and Hoots the Owl (Kevin Clash), written by Christopher Cerf (music) and Norman Stiles (lyrics). Eventually removed over concerns related to homophobia.
- "Do the Dog", sung by Prairie Dawn with a chorus "woofed" by Barkley, written by Joey Mazzarino (lyrics) and Christopher Cerf (music) .
- "A Bark in the Dark"
- "Doin' the Pigeon", sung by Bert (Frank Oz), written by Joe Raposo.
- "Doll House", written by Alan Robert Scott, Marilyn Lang Scott, and Keith Vernon Textor.
- "Do-Op Hop", sung by Kermit the Frog (Jim Henson) with backup vocals by Ivy Austin and Cheryl Hardwick, music by Christopher Cerf and lyrics by Norman Stiles.
- "Don't Be Afraid", sung by Paul Jacobs. Animated by Paul Fierlinger using the same stop motion animation used on Teeny Little Super Guy.
- "Don't Take Your Ones to Town", written and performed by Johnny Cash; a version of his 1958 hit "Don't Take Your Guns to Town", with new lyrics.
- "Don't Touch Me", sung by Benny Rabbit.
- "Don't Walk (That's what the sign says)", sung by Alaina Reed Hall.
- "Don't Walk", sung by an Anything Muppet Bridegroom (Christopher Cerf), music by Christopher Cerf and lyrics by Sarah Durkee.
- "Don't Waste Water", sung by Jerry Nelson over footage of how water is used.
- "Down Below the Street", sung by Take 6.
- "Do the Dinosaur Dance", sung by Big Bird, Rosita, and Elmo
- "Dressed Up", sung/written by Joe Raposo over footage of birds. A remade version is sung by Ron Marshall over footage of kids dressing up in fancy clothes.
- "Easy Goin' Day", sung by Big Bird (Caroll Spinney), from Follow That Bird
- "Eating", sung by Joe Raposo. The song features Raposo singing with himself, created through double-tracking.
- "Eating Cookies All Seasons", sung by Cookie Monster (Frank Oz), Sung to the tune of "Makin' Whoopee" by Eddie Cantor.
- "Eight Balls of Fur", sung by Little Chrissy (Christopher Cerf) to the tune of "Great Balls of Fire", written by Tony Geiss.
- "Eight Beautiful Notes", sung by Count von Count (Jerry Nelson), written by Jeff Moss.
- "Eight is Great", sung by Count von Count (Jerry Nelson) about the number 8, written by Annie Evans (lyrics) and Adam Schlesinger (music).
- "Eight Penny Candy Man," sung/written/animated by Bud Luckey with lyrics by Don Hadley. Later sung by Northern Calloway on "The Count Counts".
- "Eighteen Sandwiches", sung by Angela Cappelli over animation to the tune of "I'm Eighteen" by Alice Cooper, music by Paul Jacobs and lyrics by Sarah Durkee.
- "Elevator Song", sung by a barbershop quartet of Anything Muppets (voiced by Jerry Nelson, Frank Oz, Christopher Cerf, and Richard Hunt), written by Sam Pottle (music) and Ray Sipherd (lyrics).
- "Elmo & the Lavender Moon", sung by Los Lobos to the tune of "Kiko and the Lavender Moon", written by David Hidalgo and Luis Santeiro.
- "Elmo's Song", sung by Elmo (Kevin Clash), Big Bird (Caroll Spinney) and Snuffy (Martin P. Robinson), written by Tony Geiss.
- "Elmo Wrote His Name", sung by Elmo, with Big Bird, Susan Robinson (Loretta Long) and some Anything Muppets, written by David Korr (lyrics) and Stephen Lawrence (music); included on The Best of Elmo album.
- "Elmo's Rap Alphabet", a rap version of the Alphabet Song rapped by Elmo, written by Emily Kingsley (lyrics) and Robby Merkin (music).
- "Elmo's Circle Song", sung by Elmo about his love of circles and other circular objects, at the end of the song, he gets dizzy and falls unconscious, written by Molly Boylan (lyrics) and Steve Nelson (music).
- "Exercise", sung by Betty Lou (Fran Brill), Grover (Frank Oz) and a chorus of generic Muppets; a parody of "Physical" by Olivia Newton-John, written by Cheryl Hardwick and Maggie Bloomfield.
- "Everybody Eats", sung/written by Joe Raposo.
- "Everybody Sleeps", sung/written by Joe Raposo.
- "Everybody's Song", sung by Bip Bippadotta and the Androoze Sisters, written by Jeff Moss.
- "Everyone Likes Ice Cream", written by Jeff Moss.
- "Everyone Makes Mistakes", sung by Big Bird (Caroll Spinney), written by Jeff Moss.
- "Everyone Needs a Friend", sung by Big Bird and Snuffy to their new friend, Abby Cadabby (Leslie Carrara-Rudolph), written by Tony Geiss.
- "Everything in the Wrong Place Ball", sung by Oscar (Caroll Spinney) and Grundgetta (Pam Arciero), written by Stephen J. Lawrence (music) and Cathi Rosenberg-Turow (lyrics).
- "Face Facts", sung by Lillian (Lillias White)
- "Fat Cat Sat Hat", sung by Bip Bippadotta (Jim Henson) and three Anything Muppets (Jerry Nelson green, Frank Oz blue, Jim Henson lavender), written by Joe Raposo and Jeff Moss.
- "Feeling All Right With Five", to accompany a film on swimming penguins, first season
- "Feelin' Good/Feelin' Bad", sung by Bert and Ernie, lyrics by David Axlerod and music by Sam Pottle.
- "Fiesta", sung by Rosita (Carmen Osbahr), and is also joined by Elmo, Zoe, Telly, Baby Bear, and Betty Lou for a party, lyrics by Luis Santeiro and music by Fernando Rivas.
- "Five Feet High and Rising", written and performed by Johnny Cash.
- "Five Jive", rapped by Elmo (Kevin Clash) and sung by two backup singers about the number 5 in a similar manner to MC Hammer, written by Christopher Cerf (music) and Norman Stiles (lyrics).
- "Five People in My Family", sung by a Muppet family, written by Jeff Moss.
- "Follow the Arrows", sung by Luis (Emilio Delgado), written by Peter Howard and Emily Kingsley.
- "Follow Directions", sung by Paul Jacobs; animated by Paul Fierlinger using the same stop motion animation used for Teeny Little Super Guy.
- "Four Big Lions," sung/written/animated by Bud Luckey with lyrics by Don Hadley.
- "Four Seasons Song", sung by a female vocalist over animation, written by Jeff Moss.
- "Fourteen Desert", sung by Jerry Nelson about the number 14, animated by Joey Ahlbum, written by Robby Merkin.
- "From Your Head", sung by Betty Carter, written by Jeff Moss and animated by Sally Cruikshank. Later sung by Diane Schuur and Elmo.
- "Frazzle", sung by Frazzle and the Frazzletones, music by Sam Pottle and lyrics by David Axlerod.
- "Fruit Song", sung/written by Joe Raposo over footage of kids eating fruit.
- "Funny Farm," sung/written/animated by Bud Luckey with lyrics by Don Hadley.
- "Furry Blue Mommy of Mine", sung by Herry Monster, written by Sam Pottle (music) and David Axlerod (lyrics).
- "Furry Happy Monsters", sung by R.E.M., joined by a Kate Pierson Anything Muppet and the monsters (including the Two-Headed Monster), a parody of the group's song "Shiny Happy People".
- "Fuzzy and Blue", sung by Grover, Herry Monster, and Cookie Monster, eventually, Frazzle interrupts the song because he wants to be in it, despite not being blue, so they change it to "Fuzzy and Blue and Orange", written by David Axlerod (lyrics) and Stephen Lawrence (music).
- "Game of Make Believe", sung by Cecille
- "The Garbage Man Blues" accompanying a film about what the garbage truck does.
- "Get Your Body Busy", performed by Baby Tooth and the Funky Funk
- "Girl of the World", sung by Zoe, Prairie Dawn (both; Fran Brill), Rosita (Carmen Osbahr), and Betty Lou (Lisa Buckley), to the tune of the feminist anthem "I'm a Woman", music by Paul Jacobs and lyrics by Sarah Durkee.
- "Goodbye Garbage!", aired in episode #198
- "Good Morning, Mister Sun", sung by Big Bird
- "Good Morning, Morning", sung by Herry Monster (Jerry Nelson), written by Jeff Moss.
- "Grasshopper", waltz instrumental by Joe Raposo, features a piano and harpsichord, created for an animal film
- "Green Grows The Rushes Go", sung by Uncle Edgar the Turtle and his nephews. Animated by Buzzco Associates.
- "Grow High, Grow Low" sung by Ernie (Jim Henson), with a tomato (Camille Bonora), a potato (Jerry Nelson), a lettuce (Richard Hunt), a zucchini (Martin P. Robinson), and a beet (Kevin Clash), written by Joe Raposo (music) and Luis Santeiro (lyrics).
- "Habanera", an aria from the opera Carmen by Bizet, sung by a stop-motion animated orange lady.
- "Handful of Crumbs", sung by Cookie Monster, written by Christopher Cerf and Norman Stiles.
- "Happiness", sung by the entire cast. Originally from the Broadway musical, You're a Good Man, Charlie Brown.
- "Happy Happiness" sung by Tyrone Davis over footage of kids at the beach, written by Paul Jacobs and Sarah Durkee.
- "Happy Tappin' with Elmo", sung by Elmo (Kevin Clash), written by Christopher Cerf.
- "Happy To Meet You" sung by Celine Dion and Herry Monster, written by Jeff Moss.
- "Has Anybody Seen my Dog?", sung by Marty (Jerry Nelson) and Grover (Frank Oz), written by Joe Raposo.
- "Hawk", instrumental by Joe Raposo, created for an animal film
- "Healthy Food" sung/rapped by Cookie Monster (Frank Oz) to the tune of "Walk This Way" by Aerosmith/Run DMC, written by Christopher Cerf.
- "Heavy and Light" sung by Elmo and Telly, written by Christopher Cerf (music) and Sarah Durkee (lyrics).
- "Hello, Sammy" sung by Carol Channing, Sammy the Snake (Jim Henson), and the chorus girl S's to the tune of "Hello, Dolly!".
- "Here We Are" sung by two cartoon cacti. Animated by Julie Zammarchi
- "Hey, Diddle Diddle (The Cat in the Fiddle)", sung by Uncle Edgar the turtle and his nephews. Animated by Buzzco Associates.
- "Hey Food" sung by Cookie Monster (Frank Oz) and The Beetles (Christopher Cerf and Richard Hunt), a parody of "Hey Jude" by The Beatles, written by Christopher Cerf and Norman Stiles. It also resulted in a lawsuit for infringement, which was eventually settled for US$50.
- "High, Middle, Low", sung by an Anything Muppet barbershop trio, voiced by Jerry Nelson (high), Joe Raposo (middle) and Jeff Moss (low), music by Jeff Moss and lyrics by Emily Kingsley.
- "Hold My Hand" sung by Hootie and the Blowfish with Muppets and kids teaching them to hold their hands to their adults while crossing a street.
- "Home to Me", sung by three Anything Muppet children (Jim Henson, Fran Brill and Richard Hunt) about their homes, written by Joe Raposo and Luis Santeiro.
- "The Honker Duckie Dinger Jamboree" sung by Ernie (Jim Henson), written by Christopher Cerf and Norman Stiles.
- "Honk Around the Clock", sung by Christopher Cerf as he accompanies the Honkers, music by Christopher Cerf and lyrics by Tony Geiss.
- "How Do You Get from Here to There?", sung by anything Muppets (Jim Henson, Marilyn Sokol and Jerry Nelson), written by Jeff Moss.
- "I Am Somebody", sung by Abby Cadabby (Leslie Carrara-Rudolph), Wes (Bradley Freeman Jr.), Elmo (Kevin Clash), and Rosita (Carmen Osbahr) written by Yolanda Brown
- "I Am a Fine Musician"
- "I Spy Song", sung by Abby Cadabby and Elmo
- "I Am The World", sung by Gloria Globe, music by Stephen Lawrence and lyrics by Mark Saltzman.
- "I Am Chicken", sung by a chicken (Louise Gold) and a chorus of backup hens, parodying "I Am Woman", written by Christopher Cerf and Norman Stiles.
- "I Can Sing", sung by Herry Monster and an Anything Muppet named Louisey (Louise Gold), written by Jeff Moss.
- "I Can't Get No Cooperation", sung by The Cobble Stones (Christopher Cerf) to the tune of "(I Can't Get No) Satisfaction" by The Rolling Stones, written by Christopher Cerf and Sharon Lerner.
- "I Don't Want to Live on the Moon", sung by Ernie.
- "I Got a Song", sung by Ray Charles with Ernie and Bert, written by Sam Pottle (music) and David Axlerod (lyrics).
- "I Hate Christmas", sung by Oscar the Grouch in 1978.
- "I Heard My Dog Bark", sung by Gordon (Roscoe Orman) singing the main body, assisted by Bob, Susan, Uncle Wally, and the kids; written by Jeff Moss.
- "I Just Adore Four", sung by Big Bird (Caroll Spinney) and the Tarnish Brothers (Frank Oz, Jerry Nelson, and Richard Hunt), lyrics by Joseph A. Bailey and music by Sam Pottle.
- "I Laugh When I'm Happy", sung by Ernie (Steve Whitmire) to Baby Natasha (Kevin Clash), written by Tony Geiss.
- "I Love a Waltz", sung by Count von Count (Jerry Nelson) dancing around with The Countess in his castle, written by Paul Parnes.
- "I Love Being a Pig", sung by Joe Raposo, written by Derek Lamb over footage of a pig's body, snout, and tail (film first used in Episode #179)
- "I Love My Chair"
- "I Love My Family" sung by Julia, Samuel, Daniel, and Elena.
- "I Love My Elbows" sung by Kermit the Frog (Jim Henson), music by Paul Jacobs and lyrics by Sarah Durkee.
- "I Love Trash" sung by Oscar the Grouch (Caroll Spinney), written by Jeff Moss.
- "I Put My Leg in My Pants", written by Jeff Moss, over footage of kids getting dressed.
- "I Want a Monster to Be My Friend", sung in audio track by a little girl (Marilyn Sokol) in The Sesame Street Monsters!, later in an insert for the show, the Betty Lou puppet lip-synched to Sokol's vocal track, lyrics by Robert Pierce and music by Sam Pottle.
- "I Want to Be Me", sung by Cecille
- "I Want to Count", sung by Cab Calloway and Count von Count (Jerry Nelson).
- "I Wonder", sung by Ernie (Steve Whitmire), written by Molly Boylan (lyrics) and Adam Schlesinger (music).
- "I Wonder About the World Above Up There", sung by Kermit the Frog and three Anything Muppet kids (performed by Jerry Nelson, Camille Bonora, and Martin P. Robinson), written by Donald Alan Siegal; this was Jim Henson's final singing performance as Kermit the Frog on Sesame Street, included on Jim Henson: A Sesame Street Celebration.
- "If I Knew You Were Comin' I'd've Baked a Cake", sung by Ernie (Jim Henson) and Cookie Monster (Frank Oz), written by Al Hoffman, Bob Merrill, and Clem Watts.
- "If I Were", sung by Kermit the Frog (Jim Henson), written by David Axlerod (lyrics) and Stephen J. Lawrence (music).
- "If Elmo had Teeth" sung by Elmo. It was nominated for "Outstanding Original Song" in the 1997 Daytime Emmy Awards.
- "If Moon was Cookie", sung by Cookie Monster (Frank Oz), written by Stephen J. Lawrence (music) and Luis Santeiro (lyrics).
- "I'll Love You in Spring Time", sung by Guy Smiley (Jim Henson) during all the seasons of the year, written by Jeff Moss.
- "I'm a big bird", sung by Big Bird (Caroll Spinney) written by Phillip Namanworth
- "I'm a person", sung by Prairie Dawn (Fran Brill) also written by Phillip Namanworth
- "I'm a Real Cowboy", sung by Forgetful Jones, Clementine, and a few cowboys, music by Joe Raposo and lyrics by Sara Compton.
- "I'm an Aardvark", sung/written by Joe Raposo over footage of an aardvark.
- "I'm an Earthworm", sung by Slimey (Martin P. Robinson), written by Tony Geiss.
- "I'm Cold", sung by a lavender Anything Muppet girl (Marilyn Sokol), written by Joe Raposo (music and lyrics) and Emily Kingsley (lyrics).
- "I'm Curious", animated by Sally Cruikshank, music by Paul Jacobs and lyrics by Sarah Durkee.
- "I'm Gonna Get to You", sung by Cecille
- "I'm Pretty", sung by David (Northern Calloway) over footage of fish and other sea creatures, written by Joe Raposo.
- "I'm Proud to Be a Cow", sung by Gladys the Cow (Richard Hunt), written by Tony Geiss.
- "I'm Sad Because I'm Happy", sung by Oscar the Grouch, written by Christopher Cerf and Norman Stiles.
- "I'm So Blue", sung by Big Bird (Caroll Spinney), from Follow That Bird.
- "I'm Talkin' Love", sung by Trisha Yearwood with Herry Monster, Baby Bear, and Grover, music by Paul Jacobs and lyrics by Sarah Durkee.
- "I'm Under the Weather Over You", sung by Polly Darton
- "Il Alphabetto", the alphabet in the style of Mozart opera, sung by Madame Alma Cluck (a parody of Alma Gluck, voiced by Ivy Austin) and the Poultry Choir, she accidentally whacks into the other chicken while singing the climax part of the aria, written by Tony Geiss.
- "Imagination Rain", sung by Richie Havens, written by Steve Zuckerman.
- "Imagination Song", sung by Ernie (Jim Henson) and Bert (Frank Oz), written by Joe Raposo.
- "Imagine If You Would (A Ship Inside Your Mind)", sung by Prairie Dawn (Fran Brill) to Captain Shnook and Mr. Shneeze (both respective parodies of Captain Hook and Mr. Smee from Peter Pan, performed by David Rudman and Jerry Nelson, respectively), aired in episode #3069, music by Jeff Moss and lyrics by Joey Mazzarino.
- "Imagine That", sung by Ernie about things that he sometimes imagines to be, written by Jeff Moss
- "In and Out Crowd", a spoof of "The In Crowd" animated by Sally Cruikshank, music by Christopher Cerf, and lyrics by Sarah Durkee.
- "In and Out Disco" A Monster Disco segment where Frazzle learns to dance in the In Doors and out the Out Doors.
- "In My Book", sung by Jerry Nelson over animation of a boy reading his book, written by Jeff Moss; it was later sung by Bert (Eric Jacobson).
- "In The Library", sung by David (Norman Calloway), written by Joe Raposo.
- "In Your Imagination", sung by Elmo, written by Christopher Cerf.
- "Indian U Call", sung by Nelson (Steve Whitmire) and Jeanette (Karen Prell) to the tune of "Indian Love Call" by Nelson Eddy and Jeanette MacDonald, written by Lee Pockriss and Judy Freudberg.
- "Infinity (That's About the Size of It)" sung/written/animated by Bud Luckey.
- "It Ain't Heavy, It's My Feather", a spoof of "He Ain't Heavy, He's My Brother", sung by an animated chicken (Ivy Austin).
- "It's Alive", sung by Kermit the Frog (Jim Henson) of how one can tell what is alive and what's not, written by Joe Raposo (music) and Luis Santeiro (lyrics).
- "It's Funny", sung by an Anything Muppet guitarist joined by other laughing Anything Muppets, later sung by Polly Darton (Fran Brill), music by Sam Pottle and lyrics by David Korr.
- "It's Hip To Be a Square", a spoof of Huey Lewis And The News' "Hip To Be Square", sung by an animated red square (Paul Jacobs).
- "It's Nighttime", sung by Maggie Rogers, written by Christopher Jackson (actor).
- "It's Ookyook (It's Cold Outside)", sung by an Alaskan girl dressing up for winter, written by Joe Raposo.
- "Italian Street Song", sung by Placido Flamingo (Richard Hunt) and the All-Animal Orchestra. Conducted by Seiji Ozawa. From the operetta Naughty Marietta by Victor Herbert.
- "Jellyman Kelly", sung by James Taylor and a group of kids, written by James and Sarah Taylor.
- "J Friends", written by Jeff Moss, sung by a group of four Anything Muppets listing off names of their friends, which begin with the letter J.
- "J Jump", sung/written by Joe Raposo over footage of people jumping.
- "Jumpin' Jive", sung by Cab Calloway with The Two-Headed Monster (Jerry Nelson and Richard Hunt).
- "Just Happy to Be Me", sung by Kingston Livingston lll (Kevin Clash), written by Gail Sky King.
- "Keep the Park Clean for the Pigeons", sung by Bert (Frank Oz), written by Tony Geiss
- "Kids Just Love to Brush", sung by The Bicuspids (Ivy Austin) in a parody of Girls Just Want to Have Fun by Cyndi Lauper, music by Cheryl Hardwick and lyrics by Maggie Bloomfield and Judy Freudberg.
- "Kids with Wings", sung by Abby Cadabby (Leslie Carrara-Rudolph), written by Tony Geiss.
- "Ladybugs' Picnic", written/animated by Bud Luckey with lyrics by Don Hadley, sung by Jim Kweskin
- "La, La, La", sung by Bert (Frank Oz) and Ernie (Jim Henson) about the words that begin with the letter L, written by Joe Raposo.
- "Lambaba", sung by Count von Count (Jerry Nelson) with the singing, dancing lambs, in a spoof of the Lambada craze, written by Tony Geiss.
- "Letter B", sung by The Beetles lead singer (Richard Hunt), a spoof of "Let It Be" by The Beatles, written by Christopher Cerf. It resulted in a $5.5 million copyright lawsuit from Northern Songs, the owner of the Beatles' catalog; the suit was settled for $50 after Michael Jackson acquired the Beatles' catalog from Northern Songs.
- "The Letter N", sung by Nick Normal (Jerry Nelson) and the Nickmatics, written by Stephen Lawrence (music) and Mark Saltzman (lyrics).
- "Lincoln Park Zoo", written and animated by Bob Kurtz with lyrics by Big Daddy, sung by Big Daddy. Later sung by Gordon, Big Bird, Elmo, Grover, Oscar, Cookie Monster, Snuffy, Herry, Ernie, and Bert in one episode.
- "Listen to the Bells", sung by a hippy Anything Muppet in sunglasses (Jim Henson), written by Jeff Moss.
- "Listen to the Music", sung by David (Northern Calloway) and the Ringers, written by Sam Pottle and David Axlerod.
- "Little Miss Count Along", sung by Count von Count (Jerry Nelson) and Zoe (Fran Brill) to the tune of "Little Miss Can't Be Wrong" by Spin Doctors, written by Adam Rudman (lyrics) and Robby Merkin (music).
- "Little Plant", sung by Ernie about how he takes care of his plant, who "thanks" him, written by Joe Raposo (music) and Luis Santeiro (lyrics).
- "Little Things", sung/written by Joe Raposo; Prairie Dawn later covered it for Sing: Songs of Joe Raposo. And later sung by Tony Bennett and Lexine for Sesame Street: 35 years of Songs on the Street.
- "Look a Little Closer", sung by Bob (Bob McGrath), written by Joe Raposo.
- "Lowercase N" written by Steve Zuckerman over an animated film of a lonely lowercase N
- "Long Hard Climb", sung/written by Joe Raposo; a version by Jerry Nelson is recorded on Elmo's Lowdown Hoedown, and retitled Long Hard Road.
- "Love the Ocean", sung by The Beach Monsters (Jerry Nelson, Camille Bonora, Kevin Clash, and Martin P. Robinson), to the tune of "The Little Old Lady (from Pasadena)" by Jan and Dean, music by Paul Jacobs and lyrics by Sarah Durkee.
- "Lovely Eleven Morning", written/animated by Bud Luckey with lyrics by Don Hadley.
- "Lucky Thirteen", sung by a mouse (Jerry Nelson), animated by Loring Doyle, music by Paul Jacobs and lyrics by Sarah Durkee.
- "Lucy In The Sky With Diamonds", sung by Betty Lou and Little Jerry and the Monotones. Originally sung by The Beatles.
- "Lulu's Back in Town", sung by Tony (Jim Henson) and Beautiful Day Monster (Frank Oz)
- "M-M-M Meal Monster", sung by Cookie Monster (Frank Oz) and Herry Monster (Jerry Nelson), written by Jeff Moss.
- "Mad", sung by Little Jerry (Jerry Nelson) and the Monotones in their debut performance, written by Jeff Moss.
- "Mad Goat Song", written/animated by Derek Lamb
- "Magic Pig Calypso Song"
- "Mahna Mahna" (first aired 1969, episode 14), written by Piero Umiliani.
- "Martian Beauty", sung/written/animated by Bud Luckey with lyrics by Don Hadley.
- "Me and My Chair", sung by (Northern Calloway), later covered by animated character Traction Jackson, written by Luis Santeiro.
- "Me Gotta Be Blue", sung by Cookie Monster, written by Christopher Cerf and Norman Stiles.
- "Me Lost Me Cookie at the Disco", sung by Cookie Monster, written by Joe Raposo.
- "Me Want It (But Me Wait)", a spoof of Icona Pop's "I Love It", sung by Cookie Monster.
- "Milk", sung by Lesley Miller, bass clarinet by Leslie Scott, flute by Paul Dunkel, written by Robert Dennis
- "Monster in the Mirror", sung by Grover (Frank Oz), written by Christopher Cerf and Norman Stiles. There was a celebrity version of it which featured celebrity appearances by Whoopi Goldberg, Chubby Checker, Geena Davis, Charlayne Hunter-Gault, Bo Jackson, Ray Charles, Jeff Goldblum, Maria Conchita Alonso, Kadeem Hardison, Robert MacNeil, Jeff Smith, Robin Williams, Malcolm-Jamal Warner, Candice Bergen, Bo Diddley, Julia Roberts, Tyne Daly, Blair Underwood, Siskel and Ebert, Tracey Ullman, Glenn Close, Lou Diamond Phillips, and Kid 'n Play. It was arranged by Paul Jacobs, produced by Jim Blashfield and directed by Laura DiTrapani
- "Mom and Me", sung by a girl in voice-over about how great having a family can be, written by Joe Raposo; the vocals were later rerecorded by Lexine Bondoc.
- "Moonshine", sung by Jerry Nelson as a little boy wondering at the Moon's beauty and light, written by Jeff Moss and animated by Klasky Csupo; it was later sung by Zoe (Fran Brill) and Herry Monster (Jerry Nelson).
- "Mother Goose Jamboree", sung by Cab Callowmouse (a parody a Cab Calloway) and various Mother Goose characters having a party at a bookstore all night, Ivy Austin performs the introduction, music by Paul Jacobs and lyrics by Sarah Durkee.
- "Muppets Rhyme in School", sung by Mr. Essex's students, such as Prairie Dawn (Fran Brill), as he (Jim Henson) teaches them about rhymes (such as nose and goes), to the tune of "Moses" from Singin' in the Rain, written by Sonia Manzano (lyrics) and Joe Raposo (music).
- "My Name is Zoe", sung by Zoe (Fran Brill), written by Sarah Durkee and Robby Merkin.
- "My Name", sung by Maya Angelou, Carlo Alban, Lexine Bondoc, and Elmo (Kevin Clash)
- "My New Computer", sung by Lillias White, music by Christopher Cerf and lyrics by Sarah Durkee.
- "My Triangle Home", sung by Clementine (Camille Bonora) to the tune of "Home on the Range", music by Joe Raposo and lyrics by Nancy Sans.
- "Natasha's Lullabye", sung by Humphrey (David Rudman) to Baby Natasha (Kevin Clash), written by Christopher Cerf and Judy Freudberg.
- "The National Association of "W" Lovers", sung by Bert and various Anything Muppets in an organization devoted to recognizing and celebrating the virtues of the letter W, music by Joe Raposo and lyrics by Jerry Juhl.
- "New Baby", sung by Frieda (Fran Brill) about the new baby (Richard Hunt) that her mother (Pam Arciero) recently had, written by Joe Raposo (music and lyrics) and Luis Santeiro (lyrics); all three monsters in this song would become a different monster family, Frieda would eventually be reworked as Ingrid, the same puppet used for Frieda's mother would be later used for Humphrey, and the baby became Baby Natasha.
- "Night Bug Boogie", sung by three singing bugs (voiced by Ivy Austin) inside a wall full of dancing bugs, written by Nancy Sans (lyrics) and Stephen J. Lawrence (music).
- "Nineteen Party", sung/written by Paul Jacobs over animation to the tune of "1999" by Prince, with lyrics by Sarah Durkee.
- "No Matter How You Count Them", sung by a Carmen Miranda-style Anything Muppet, music by Jeff Moss and lyrics by Emily Kingsley.
- "No Matter What", sung by Kevin Clash with footage of kids playing with a beach ball, written by Jeff Moss.
- "None, Some, All", sung by Bip Bippadotta with various anything muppets and monsters, written by Joe Raposo (music) and Jeff Moss (lyrics).
- "Numerical Correspondence Song", sung by a quintet of Anything Muppets in a Gilbert and Sullivan-style operetta, music by Sam Pottle and lyrics by David Korr and David Axlerod.
- "Numero Comparsa", sung by Celia Cruz and the anything muppets with a salsa rhythm, written by Joe Raposo (music) and Luis Santeiro (lyrics).
- "Octopus Blues", sung by an octopus (Kevin Clash), written by Jeff Moss.
- "Octopus's Garden", sung by an Anything Muppet diver (Jim Henson), a Fat Blue fish (Frank Oz), and a clam (voiced by Joe Raposo), written by Ringo Starr.
- "Ocean Emotion," sung by Elmo
- "Old Button Hole" sung over footage of kids getting dressed
- "On My Pond", sung by Kermit the Frog, written by Christopher Cerf (music) and Sarah Durkee (lyrics).
- "Once Upon a Time", accompanying a short film about an Alaskan sculpturist carving figures of cold climate animals out of wood, written by David Snell.
- "One Banana", sung by a lavender Anything Muppet (Jim Henson), and a group of Muppet Bananas dressed like Carmen Miranda, written by Jeff Moss.
- "One Fine Face", sung by Ernie and Elmo, written by Jeff Moss.
- "One of These Things (Is Not Like the Others)"; written by Joe Raposo and Jon Stone
- "One", sung by puppeteered numbers.
- "One Two Three," sung/written/animated by Bud Luckey with lyrics by Don Hadley.
- "One Way", sung by a green Anything Muppet greaser (Christopher Cerf), written by Christopher Cerf (lyrics) and Sam Pottle (music).
- "Ooh What a Fabulous Party", sung/written by Paul Jacobs over animation by Sally Cruikshank, with lyrics by Sarah Durkee.
- "Opposite Stuff", sung by Bip Bippadotta (Jim Henson) and two cows (Richard Hunt and Kevin Clash), written by Joe Raposo (music) and Jeff Moss (lyrics).
- "Oscar's Junk Band", sung by Oscar the Grouch and his junk band, written by Christopher Cerf (music) and Sarah Durkee (lyrics).
- "P is My Favorite Letter", sung by a trio of Anything Muppet hillbillies, written by Jeff Moss.
- "Part of the Whole", sung by Paul Jacobs. Animated by Sally Cruikshank.
- "The Pasta Song", sung by Kevin Clash
- "Peanut Butter", sung/written by Joe Raposo over footage of a peanut butter factory.
- "The People In Your Neighborhood", usually sung by Bob (Bob McGrath), written by Jeff Moss. Variations highlighted different people and their careers.
- "Pigeons and Cookies and Trash", sung by Bert, Cookie Monster, and Oscar the Grouch, written by Jeff Moss.
- "Pinball Number Count", a theme for a recurring segment about counting numbers, was sung by The Pointer Sisters.
- "Planets, Moon, and Stars", sung by Elmo (Kevin Clash) to his doll, David, from his bedroom, later Jerry Nelson provided vocals for a CGI-animated version of the segment, written by Jeff Moss.
- "Portrait D'Un Robot", accompanying a short film showing toys, robots, and satellites, written by Janko Nilovic
- "Pretty Baby", regards kissing rhinos, sung by Joe Raposo.
- "Pride", sung by Elmo and the Goo Goo Dolls (parody of "Slide")
- "Put A Lid On It", sung by the Squirrel Nut Zippers
- "Put Down the Duckie", sung by Hoots the Owl and Ernie, with cameo performances by Carl Banks, Celia Cruz, Danny DeVito, John Candy, Andrea Martin, Joe Williams, Rhea Perlman, Paul Reubens, Madeline Kahn, Paul Simon, Pete Seeger, Keith Hernandez, Mookie Wilson, Sean Landeta, Mark Ingram, Karl Nelson, Jeremy Irons, Itzhak Perlman, Gordon Jackson, Jean Marsh, Wynton Marsalis, Jane Curtin and Ladysmith Black Mambazo; music by Christopher Cerf and lyrics by Norman Stiles.
- "The Question Song", sung by a lavender Anything Muppet little girl (Fran Brill) and Grover, music by Jeff Moss and lyrics by Jerry Juhl.
- "Quiero Ser Tu Amigo" (English: Do You Want To Be My Friend?), sung by Romeo Santos.
- "Quiet Time Song", sung by Ernie underneath an apple tree, written by Joe Raposo (music) and Tom Dunsmuir (lyrics).
- "Rain Falls", sung by Oscar the Grouch and Bob McGrath, music by Joe Raposo and lyrics by Jeff Moss.
- "Raise Your Hand", sung by Little Chrissy (Christopher Cerf), written by Jeff Moss.
- "Rap Animation #6", sung by boy and girl
- "Rap Animation #7", sung by a boy
- "Rap Animation #9", sung by a girl
- "Rap Animation #11", sung by a boy
- "Rap Animation #13", sung by a girl
- "Rap Animation #15", sung by boy and girl
- "Rap Animation #17", sung by boy and girl
- "Rap Animation #19", sung by boy and girl
- "Readers of the Open Range", sung by Vern (Jerry Nelson) and his group (Kevin Clash and Richard Hunt) who specialize in reading signs and they introduce themselves, music by Joe Raposo and lyrics by Sara Compton; it was also sung in audio track by Elmo and Noel Cowherd (Jerry Nelson) on Elmo's Lowdown Hoedown.
- "Rebel L", sung by Billy Idle (Kevin Clash), the rebel L (voiced by Christopher Cerf), and the police officers to the tune of "Rebel Yell" by Billy Idol, music by Christopher Cerf and lyrics by Sarah Durkee.
- "Rubber Duckie", sung by Ernie (Jim Henson) and Daveed Diggs, written by Jeff Moss. A 1970 Billboard Hot 100 top 20 hit.
- "Red and Blue", sung by Elmo and Grover, written by Jeff Moss.
- "The Redwood Tree", sung by Uncle Edgar turtle and his nephews, Animated by Buzzco Associates.
- "Right in the Middle of My Face", originally sung by Susan (Loretta Long) and Bob (Bob McGrath), later sung by Elmo, written by Jeff Moss.
- "Rock 'N Roll Readers", sung by Little Chrissy (Christopher Cerf) and The Alphabeats (voiced by Jeff Moss and Paul Jacobs), music by Christopher Cerf and lyrics by Sara Compton.
- "Romeo and Juliet", accompanying a short animated insert in which an acorn falls from an oak tree and grows into another one.
- "Run, Run, Everybody Run", sung by Joe Raposo
- "Salt, My Salt", sung by Jerry Nelson over footage of sea salt production in India
- "Salute to the Banana", sung by Ivy Austin
- "The Salute to the Letter E", sung by Guy Smiley (Jim Henson) to the Letter E (who won on The Letter of the Day Pageant). Written by Tony Geiss.
- "Say Cheese", sung by Lillias White
- "Scratch My Back", sung by Bip Bippadotta (Jim Henson) and two Anything Muppet monsters, written by Jeff Moss.
- "Seven Goldfish", sung by Elmo about counting seven goldfish, written by Cheryl Hardwick and Nancy Sans.
- "Shake Your Head One Time", sung by Ernie
- "Shake Your Rattle and Roll", sung by Baby Fats Domino (Kevin Clash), written by Christopher Cerf and Belinda Ward. To the tune of Shake, Rattle, and Roll by Fats Domino.
- "Shapes in My Room", sung by Telly Monster, written by Donald Alan Siegal.
- "Share", sung by Ernie (Jim Henson) and Cookie Monster (Frank Oz) on the album In Harmony: A Sesame Street Record about sharing milk and cookies, written by Joe Raposo; it was later sung on the show by Elmo (Kevin Clash) and Zoe (Fran Brill), and again by Elmo and Ernie (Steve Whitmire).
- "Simple Pleasures", accompanying a film of girl playing with her dog at the beach sung by Bobby McFerrin
- "Sing", written by Joe Raposo. A version of it recorded by The Carpenters in 1973 reached No. 3 on the Billboard top singles chart.
- "Sing After Me", sung by Madeline Kahn and Grover (Frank Oz), written by Sam Pottle (music) and Tony Geiss (lyrics).
- "Sing Your Synonyms" sung by Luis (Emilio Delgado), Maria (Sonia Manzano), Susan (Loretta Long), Gordon (Roscoe Orman), Telly (Martin P. Robinson), Elmo (Kevin Clash), and Bob (Bob McGrath) to the tune of "Let's Call the Whole Thing Off", music by Joe Raposo and lyrics by Nancy Sans.
- "Six (My Favorite Number Is)", sung by Bert to Ernie that 6 is his favorite number, written by Jeff Moss.
- "Six Snails," sung/written/animated by Bud Luckey with lyrics by Don Hadley.
- "Sixteen Samba", sung by a group of Anything Muppets about a man's love for the number 16, written by Tony Geiss.
- "Skin", sung by Kevin Clash over footage of kids at the beach, written by Jeff Moss.
- "The Snuffle Shuffle", sung by Snuffy (Martin P. Robinson), written by Joe Raposo (music) and Luis Santeiro (lyrics).
- "Sleepover Dance", sung by Big Bird, Elmo, and Ruth Buzzi.
- "Sleepytime Bird", African lullaby sung by Maria and David to help put Big Bird to sleep.
- "Soul A", sung by an animated soul group.
- "Soul H", sung by an animated soul group.
- "Soul O", sung by an animated soul group.
- "Some Hay" by Mariah Cowrey, a parody of "Someday" by Mariah Carey.
- "Somebody Come and Play", sung/written by Joe Raposo. A re-written version of the song is used as the theme for Play With Me Sesame.
- "Something Cold", sung by Elmo in Episode 3647; written by David Korr (lyrics). Elmo sings about wishing for Carlo Alban to give him a cold treat to cool him down on a hot day.
- "Sometimes a Cookie", An animated insert song featuring an animated version of Cookie Monster. Composed by Christopher Cerf.
- "The Song of the Count", sung by Count von Count, written by Jeff Moss and Emily Kingsley.
- "Soundman Song", sung by Simon Soundman (Jerry Nelson) about how his ruff-ruff (dog) chased a meow (cat) up a tree and how the cat got down, written by Jeff Moss.
- "Sound It Out", sung by Same Sound Brown (Northern Calloway) and Farley (Jerry Nelson) reading and sounding out words on the chalkboard, lyrics by Sara Compton and music by Sam Pottle.
- "Splish Splash", Accompanying a video of zookeepers washing the elephants at the Bronx Zoo. Sung by Bobby Darin.
- "STOP!", sung by Luis (Emilio Delgado), Susan, and Bob, In an album version, it is sung by Biff, Roxie Marie, and Benny Rabbit. it is also in the home video Big Bird's Favorite Party Games.
- "Standing at the Bus Stop Sign", sung by The Four Tops.
- "Starfish", sung by a young girl, written by Joe Raposo.
- "Still, We Like Each Other", sung by Grover to a green Anything Muppet girl in a flower garden, written by Jeff Moss.
- "Staying Overnight with a Friend", sung by Big Bird and Snuffy. It is later sung by Big Bird, Elmo, and Ruth Buzzi.
- "Sugar Beet (Beet, Beet, Sugar Beet)", accompanying a film on how sugar is made.
- "Swamp Mushy Muddy", sung by Oscar the Grouch (Caroll Spinney), music by Sam Pottle and lyrics by Norman Stiles and David Axlerod.
- "(That Only Happens at) Birdland", sung by Olivia (Alaina Reed)
- "The Square Song". It later appeared in the movie Close Encounters of the Third Kind.
- "Tadpole", sung by Kermit the Frog (Jim Henson), written by Jeff Moss.
- "Take a Breath", sung/written by Joe Raposo over footage of live animals breathing; it was later re-recorded by Elmo for the tribute album Sing: Songs of Joe Raposo.
- "Tall Short Texans", animated by Joey Ahlbum, sung by a tall cowboy (voiced by Paul Jacobs) and a short cowboy (Jerry Nelson) to the tune of "Long Tall Texan", music by Paul Jacobs and lyrics by Sarah Durkee; it was later re-recorded by Big Bird and Elmo as an audio track on Elmo's Lowdown Hoedown.
- "Tall Tale", sung by Johnny Cash
- "The Birdland Jump", sung by Joe Williams at Birdland, written by Christopher Cerf and Norman Stiles.
- "The Curious Cantata", sung by Luis (Emilio Delgado), Maria (Sonia Manzano), Bob (Bob McGrath), and Big Bird (Caroll Spinney) in the tune of "Hungarian Rhapsody No. 2" by Franz Liszt.
- "The Dirtiest Town in the West", sung by Anything Muppet cowboys in the tune of "Ghost Riders In The Sky".
- "The First Time Me Eat Cookie", sung by Cookie Monster (Frank Oz) over a flashback of him as a baby, being given cookies in his high chair by his mother (performed by Kevin Clash), lyrics by Christine Ferraro and music by Mike Renzi.
- "The Frogs in the Glen", sung by Kermit the Frog (Jim Henson), written by Tony Geiss.
- "The Sneeze Song", sung by Kathleen the Cow with a pig, sheep, and horse, written by Jeff Moss.
- "The Telephone Opera", sung by Placido Flamingo (Richard Hunt) and the Nestropolitan Opera Chorus, to the tune of "Funiculì, Funiculà", written by Joe Raposo (music) and Luis Santeiro (lyrics).
- "Telly's Aquarium" sung by a group of Muppet fish, including one that resembles Telly (Martin P. Robinson) himself to the tune of The Age of Aquarius/Let the Sunshine In by The 5th Dimension, written by Annie Evans (lyrics) and Stephen Lawrence (music).
- "The Ten Commandments of Health", sung by Dr. Thad (Thad Mumford) and the Medications, lyrics by Thad Mumford and music by Christopher Cerf.
- "Telephone Rock", sung by Little Jerry and the Monotones, written by Christopher Cerf (music) and Norman Stiles (lyrics).
- "Ten Tiny Turtles on the Telephone", sung/written/animated by Bud Luckey with lyrics by Don Hadley.
- "That's How the Numbers Go", sung by Ernie (Steve Whitmire), Humphrey, Ingrid, and Benny Rabbit.
- "That's What Counts", sung by Count von Count, written by Joe Raposo.
- "Things That I Remember", sung by Ernie (Steve Whitmire), and Bert (Frank Oz), written by Jeff Moss.
- "Thinking of U", sung by The Beetles to the tune of PS, I Love You and Here, There, and Everywhere (both by The Beatles). Written by Christopher Cerf
- "The Sound That's in the Air", sung by Elmo.
- "This Frog" sung by Kermit the Frog (Jim Henson), with backup vocals by the Tarnish Brothers (Jerry Nelson, Richard Hunt, and Christopher Cerf), music by Sam Pottle and lyrics by David Axlerod.
- "This Little Piggy Went To Market", sung by Mario, Elmo (Kevin Clash), and the Oinker Sisters (Ivy Austin), (Angela Cappelli) and (Tawatha Agee)
- "Three Waltzing Chickens", sung by Marilyn Sokol over a cartoon of 3 chickens, animated by Bruce Cayard, written by David Axlerod (lyrics) and Sam Pottle (music).
- "Toothpaste Factory Rap (How Do They Get That Toothpaste in the Tube?)", Accompanying a video on how toothpaste is made.
- "Toucan Two-Step", sung/written/animated by Bud Luckey with lyrics by Don Hadley.
- "Touch, Feel"/"Touch, Hold, Feel", sung/written by Joe Raposo.
- "Trying And Trying Again", sung/written by Joe Raposo.
- "Tu Me Gustas (I Like You)", sung by Maria (Sonia Manzano), and also Luis (Emilio Delgado), written by Joe Raposo and Jeff Moss.
- "Tweet in the Morning", sung by Bobby McFerrin and the Muppet birds.
- "Two G Sounds", sung by Grover (Frank Oz) and George (Jerry Nelson), written by Jeff Moss.
- "Two Princesses", sung by The Spin Doctors with Elmo (Kevin Clash), Telly (Martin P. Robinson), and Zoe (Fran Brill).
- "Two Little Birdies", sung by Edgar the turtle and his nephews. Animated by Buzzco Associates.
- "U Really Got a Hold on Me", sung by Smokey Robinson to the tune of "You've Really Got a Hold on Me" while being chased by the letter U.
- "Ugga Wugga Lullabye", sung by the horns-up side (Richard Hunt) of the Two-Headed Monster as a bedtime song while the horns-down head (Jerry Nelson) sleeps, music by Jeff Moss and lyrics by Tony Geiss.
- "Under Over Song", sung by four animated animals, with lyrics by Maxine Fisher. Animated by Michael Sporn.
- "Up and Down Opera", sung by Placido Flamingo (Richard Hunt) and Ernie (Jim Henson), written by Christopher Cerf and Norman Stiles.
- "Up and Down", sung by Herry Monster (Jerry Nelson) and Cookie Monster (Frank Oz), written by Jeff Moss.
- "Up And Down, Left And Right", sung by Joe Raposo.
- "Up, Down, In, Out, Over, Under", sung by Cecille
- "Up, Up and Away" (first aired 1970, episode 49)
- "Upside Down World", sung by Ernie and Bert from Follow That Bird, written by Jeff Moss.
- "Wait Right Here at The Bus Stop Sign", Sung by a group of Anything Muppets as they wait for a bus.
- "Water Course" and "Exchange", accompanying a short film on how crayons are made. written by Richard Harvey.
- "Water Baby", sung/written by Joe Raposo over footage of seals and children swimming.
- "We All Sing With the Same Voice" written by J. Philip Miller and Sheppard M. Greene
- "Weaver Bird", sung/written by Joe Raposo over footage of a weaver bird.
- "We're a Family", accompanied film.
- "We Are All Earthlings" sung by an Anything Muppet (Jerry Nelson) and Elmo (Kevin Clash) with various animals, music by Jeff Moss and lyrics by Sara Compton. Later covered by Jill Scott in 2006.
- "We Are All Monsters" sung by four Anything Muppet monsters, written by Stephen Lawrence and Tony Geiss; originally, Jerry Nelson played the red monster that would be later known as Elmo, with a low, gruff voice, but after Elmo was established as a major character, his lines were redubbed by Kevin Clash in later airings.
- "We are the Seven Dwarves"
- "We can all Be Friends" Sun by Big Bird, Elmo, Alan, Abby Cadabby, and Julia.
- "Wet or Dry", sung by Little Chrissy (Christopher Cerf) to the tune of "Black or White" by Michael Jackson, music by Christopher Cerf and lyrics by Sara Compton.
- "Wet Paint", sung by How Now Brown (Christopher Cerf) and the Moo Wave, written by Christopher Cerf and Jon Stone.
- "What am I?", sung by Will.i.am in 2010
- "Which Come First (The Chicken Or The Egg)", sung/written by Joe Raposo over footage of eggs being shipped in cartons.
- "What Do I Do When I'm Alone?", sung by Grover (Frank Oz), written by Jeff Moss.
- "What Do You Do When You're A Kangaroo", sung/written by Joe Raposo over footage of a kangaroo.
- "What Do You Do With a Pet?", sung/written by Joe Raposo to a cartoon with a boy and his dog.
- "What I Am", sung by Will.i.am, written by Chris Jackson and Bill Sherman.
- "What is Friend?", sung by Cookie Monster (Frank Oz) and his friend (David Rudman), written by Luis Santeiro (lyrics) and Alan Menken (music).
- "What's Inside", sung by Lillias White (featuring a cameo of Cookie Monster)
- "What's the Name of That Song?", lyrics by David Axelrod and music by Sam Pottle.
- "When You're a Plant", sung by Stinky the Stinkweed and backup vocals provided by Benny Rabbit and Jamal (Jou Jou Papailler)
- "Who Am I?," sung by Olivia (Alaina Reed)
- "Who You, Looking At Tigers?", sung by David (Northern Calloway) over footage of a tiger, written by Joe Raposo.
- "Windy", sung by Tony and Beautiful Day Monster
- "Women Can Be", sung by female Anything Muppets (voiced by Marilyn Sokol, Carol Hall, Jane Henson and Rita Moreno), lyrics by Carol Hall and music by Sam Pottle.
- "The Word is NO!", sung by Maria (Sonia Manzano) and Gina (Alison Bartlett), written by Christopher Cerf.
- "Would You Like to Buy an O?", sung by Lefty the Salesman (Frank Oz) who attempts to sell an O to Ernie, written by Joe Raposo.
- "X Marks the Spot!", sung by Sherlock Hemlock about the letter X, written by Joe Raposo.
- "Yakety Yak (Take It Back)", A music video about not to litter. Features Bugs Bunny, Stevie Wonder, and many other celebrities.
- "Yellow Submarine", sung by three Anything Muppets including an engineer (Jim Henson), pilot (Caroll Spinney), and captain (Frank Oz)
- "You are Not Alone", sung by Sofia (Jasmine Romero), Abby Cadabby (Leslie Carrara-Rudolph), and Rosita (Carmen Osbahr)
- "You Can Get Right Up", sung by Lillias White, words by Sarah Durkee and music by Christopher Cerf.
- "You Can't Top This", sung by a CGI hammer in the tune of "U Can't Touch This" by M.C. Hammer.
- "You Gotta Be Patient (To Be a Patient)", music by Christopher Cerf and lyrics by Tony Geiss and Sonia Manzano.
- "You Say Hola and I Say Hola", sung by Luis (Emilio Delgado), and Maria (Sonia Manzano) to the tune of "Dancing Cheap to Cheap", lyrics by Sonia Manzano and music by Joe Raposo; it was also later sung by Gloria Estefan.
- "You Tickle Me", sung by Elmo, Zoe, Rosita, Herry Monster, Telly Monster, Baby Bear, and Frazzle, written by Jeff Moss.
- "You Alive", sung by Little Chrissy and The Alphabeats, Written by Christopher Cerf.
- "Your Grouchy Face", sung by James Taylor with Oscar, Episode 1777, First aired March 1, 1983
- "The Zig-Zag Dance". sung by the four Anything Muppets, written by Christopher Cerf.
- "Zizzy Zoomers", written by Joe Raposo.
- "Zunzun", sung by Celia Cruz and Big Bird (Caroll Spinney), music by Joe Raposo and lyrics by Luis Santeiro.
- "ZZ Blues", sung by Over the Top (Jerry Nelson) to the tune of "Sharp Dressed Man" by ZZ Top, music by Christopher Cerf and lyrics by Sarah Durkee.

== See also ==
- Sesame Street discography
