= Elmopalooza =

Sesame Street special

- Written by: Tom J. Astle; Joey Mazzarino
- Directed by: Tom Trbovich
- Starring: Jon Stewart; David Alan Grier; Rosie O'Donnell; Kevin Clash
- Music by: John Boylan
- Country of origin: United States
- Original language: English

Production
- Producer: Karin Young Shiel
- Editor: Todd Darling
- Running time: 45 minutes
- Production company: Children's Television Workshop

Original release
- Network: ABC
- Release: February 20, 1998

Elmopalooza! is a Sesame Street 30th anniversary special that aired on ABC on February 20, 1998. It was taped during the 29th season of Sesame Street, and features music video remakes of several classic songs from the show performed by celebrity guests.

== About the show ==
The show is a musical that takes place at New York City's Radio City Music Hall, featuring performances from guests Jon Stewart, David Alan Grier, Rosie O'Donnell, Gloria Estefan, En Vogue, the Fugees, Kenny Loggins, Shawn Colvin, Jimmy Buffett and the Mighty Mighty Bosstones to celebrate Sesame Street's 30th anniversary.

At the beginning of the show, Elmo accidentally traps Jon Stewart, the producer Prairie Dawn, and the crew for the show in a dressing room when he closes the broken door, locking them inside. David Alan Grier doesn't take this well and constantly yet harshly rebukes Elmo for this mistake, and does the same to Telly for his neurotic behavior. The Muppets decide to produce the show themselves, with Elmo hosting.

Meanwhile, Grover, Susan, Gordon, Gina, Bob, and Mr. Handford get lost on the way to Radio City Music Hall, and they end up in Roswell, New Mexico, having picked up chickens, penguins and the Yip-Yip Martians as hitchhikers.

Despite a few malfunctions, the show goes on successfully as planned, until, during a duet with Elmo and Rosie O'Donnell, Elmo is accidentally sent flying towards backstage and straight onto Telly, Zoe, and Rosita, causing them to accidentally ruin the stage setting and shaming Elmo into running away and hiding, feeling he has failed to make the show better. After the Muppets rescue the crew and Jon Stewart finally breaks out of the dressing room, they show a video of Kenny Loggins and Big Bird performing "One Small Voice" talent show to motivate Elmo to come out of hiding. Elmo heads back on stage, feeling a lot better. Elmo, Grover, Susan, Gordon, Gina, Bob, Mr. Handford, and the cast sing a medley of Sesame Street songs at the end. Then, as the credits roll, the cast and celebrity guests perform "Can You Tell Me How to Get to Sesame Street?".

== Songs ==
- "Just Happy to Be Me" - The Fugees
- "Mambo I, I, I" - Gloria Estefan
- "The Zig Zag Dance" - The Mighty Mighty Bosstones
- "I Don't Want to Live on the Moon" - Shawn Colvin and Ernie
- "I Want a Monster to Be My Friend" - En Vogue
- "Nearly Missed" - Rosie O'Donnell and Elmo
- "Caribbean Amphibian" - Jimmy Buffett and Kermit the Frog
- "One Small Voice" - Kenny Loggins and Big Bird
- Songs (medley) - Jon Stewart, David Alan Grier, Elmo and the cast
  - "Rubber Duckie" - Ernie
  - "ABC-DEF-GHI" - Big Bird
  - "I Love Trash" - Oscar the Grouch
  - "C Is For Cookie" - Cookie Monster
  - "The People in Your Neighborhood" - Bob, Gina, Gordon, Mr. Handford, Susan
- "Can You Tell Me How to Get to Sesame Street?" (during end credits) - all performers and Muppets

== Cast ==
=== Humans ===
- Alison Bartlett-O'Reilly as Gina
- Ruth Buzzi as Ruthie
- Emilio Delgado as Luis
- Loretta Long as Susan
- Sonia Manzano as Maria
- Bob McGrath as Bob
- Roscoe Orman as Gordon
- David Smyrl as Mr. Handford

=== Special guest appearances ===
- Tyra Banks
- Richard Belzer
- Tony Bennett (archive footage)
- The Mighty Mighty Bosstones
- Jimmy Buffett
- Shawn Colvin
- Cindy Crawford
- Gloria Estefan
- The Fugees
- David Alan Grier
- Kenny Loggins
- Madonna (archive footage)
- Conan O'Brien
- Rosie O'Donnell
- Jada Pinkett Smith (archive footage)
- Andy Richter
- Chris Rock
- Will Smith (archive footage)
- Jon Stewart
- En Vogue

=== Muppet Performers ===
- Kevin Clash as Elmo
- Caroll Spinney as Big Bird and Oscar the Grouch
- Steve Whitmire as Kermit the Frog and Ernie
- Frank Oz as Bert, Grover and Cookie Monster
- Jerry Nelson as Count von Count, Biff, Two-Headed Monster (Left Head) and Announcer
- David Rudman as Baby Bear, Sparky the Stuntman and Two-Headed Monster (Right Head)
- Fran Brill as Zoe and Prairie Dawn
- Joey Mazzarino as Horatio the Elephant
- Carmen Osbahr as Rosita
- Martin P. Robinson as Mr. Snuffleupagus, Slimey the Worm and Telly Monster

Additional Muppets performed by Brad Abrell, Pam Arciero, Julianne Buescher, Lisa Buckley, Kevin Carlson, Stephanie D'Abruzzo (Jill the Frog), Eric Jacobson, John Kennedy, Peter Linz, Rick Lyon, Noel MacNeal (frog drummer), Jim Martin, Drew Massey, Don Reardon, Joe Selph, John Tartaglia and Matt Vogel.

== Merchandise ==
The CD and cassette was released on March 3, 1998. This special was released on VHS and DVD on April 14, 1998.

== Accolades ==
Elmopalooza was included on the ALA Notable Children's Videos list in 1999.
