= Come Follow Me =

Come Follow Me may refer to:

- Come, Follow Me (LDS Church), the official teaching manual of the Church of Jesus Christ of Latter-day Saints
- "Come, Follow Me", a Latter-day Saint hymn; see Worship services of the Church of Jesus Christ of Latter-day Saints
- Come Follow Me, a 2013 short film with Bruce Marchiano
- "Come Follow Me", a song by The Answer from the 2006 album Rise
- "Come Follow Me", a song by Aaron Carter from the 2001 album Oh Aaron
- "Come Follow Me", a song by Apache Indian from the 1993 album No Reservations
- "Come Follow Me", a 2010 song by Untold

== See also ==
- "Come Follow Me (To the Redwood Tree)", an English language nursery rhyme
