= Selena Forever =

- Music: Fernando Rivas
- Lyrics: Edward Gallardo
- Book: Edward Gallardo
- Basis: 1997 film Selena
- Productions: 2000 US tour 2001 Los Angeles

Selena Forever is an American stage musical, based on the 1997 film Selena, that tells the life of the famous Tejano singer Selena Quintanilla-Pérez. The musical has been staged under two titles. The first, Selena Forever, was conceived with book and original lyrics by Edward Gallardo and original music by Fernando Rivas, as well as additional songs that were originally performed by Selena herself. The musical premiered at the San Antonio Municipal Auditorium before launching on an ill-fated 30-city tour. The musical was then restaged as Selena: A Musical Celebration of Life in Los Angeles.

== Productions ==
In 1999, a new Broadway bound musical entitled Selena was announced to premier in San Antonio in March 2000 to commemorate the fifth anniversary of Selena's death. Broadway producers Tom Quinn, Jerry Frankel, Peter Fitzgerald and Michael Vega were soon on board to stage the musical. Later, librettist and lyricist Edward Gallardo was brought on to write the show's book and lyrics. Fernando Rivas was to compose the show's songs.

In 2000, Selena Forever was first produced for a 30-city national tour with a budget of over $2 million. After a national casting call, the producers cast Veronica Vasquez to portray Selena. The role was alternated by Rebecca Valdez.

The musical previewed on March 21 and opened on March 23 at the San Antonio Municipal Auditorium. It opened to mostly positive reviews.

The tour continued throughout Texas, including Corpus Christi and Houston along with four other stops. However, due to financial problems and poor ticket sales, the rest of the tour was canceled. The show closed on April 30 at the Rosemont Theatre in Chicago after performing in only in six cities. The tour, in total, ran from March 21 through April 30 after four previews and 56 regular performances. A cast recording was never produced.

Following the abrupt ending of the tour, in March 2001 Selena Forever was rewritten, reproduced and renamed under the title Selena: A Musical Celebration Of Life. Originally the show was to be directed by Daniel Valdez, who would also perform as Abraham. After a falling out with the producer, he left and was replaced by choreographer Miranda Garrison.

With a $1 million budget and after a week's delay, the production began previews on March 28, 2001, and opened on April 19, at the James Doolittle Theatre (now the Ricardo Montalban Theatre) in Los Angeles, California. Despite receiving harsh criticism, the show became a box office success. It was expected to close on May 27, but due to extremely high ticket sales, was extended by two weeks. The production closed in November of that same year, after over 200 performances.

== Reception ==
Selena Forever was received positively by some critics. Deborah Martin of the San Antonio Express stated that the show would "appeal to hard-core Selena fans and musical theatre fans who are looking for something new." Ramiro Burr of Billboard magazine said that the show's musical numbers "deliver the hardest punches." Linda Emmerick of the Chicago Sun-Times noted the performance of the cast. Veronica Vasquez and Margo Reymundo, who played Selena's mother, were given critical acclaim for their roles. Mario Tarradell of the Dallas Morning News was less positive. He felt that the "legend is lost" in the production, despised the show's musical numbers, and felt that Selena and Broadway don't mix. However, he praised the cast's performances.

== Musical numbers ==
Act I

- "A New Show's About to Begin" - Selena and Ensemble
- "The Ballad of Selena" - Los Sueños Del Pueblo
- "Somewhere Over the Rainbow" - Young Selena
- "Simply Me" - Young Selena
- "Blue Moon Memories" - Abraham
- "Abraham’s Dream" - Abraham, Marcella
  - "Como La Flor" - Adult Selena
- "Papa Gayo’s" - Los Sueños Del Pueblo
  - "Blue Moon" - Young Selena
- "Abraham’s Dream" (Reprise) - Abraham
- "Living On A Bus" (Medley) - Marcella and Company
  - "Dame Un Beso" - Selena y Los Dinos
  - "La Bamba" - Selena y Los Dinos
- "Guitar Solo" - Chris
- "Baila Esta Cumbia" - Selena y Los Dinos
- "I’ve Grown Up, Daddy" - Selena and Company
- "Somebody Special" - Suzette, Los Sueños Del Pueblo
- "Pizza & Coke" - Selena
- "Wanting a Dream" - A.B., Los Sueños Del Pueblo
- "My Daughter Wants to Be Just Like Selena" - Mothers
  - "Techno Cumbia" - Daughters
- "Amor Prohibido" - Selena y Los Dinos
- "Como La Flor" - Selena y Los Dinos

Act II

- "God's Child (Baila Conmigo)" - Selena and Los Suenos Del Pueblo
- "Just Be Yourself, Selena" - Marcella, Suzette
- "Bidi Bidi Bom Bom" - Selena y Los Dinos
- "La Carcacha" - Selena y Los Dinos
- "To Him She’s a Woman" - Marcella
- "A New Contract" - A.B., Los Sueños Del Pueblo
- "Missing My Baby" - Selena y Los Dinos
- "Meet Me In Corpus Christi" - Chris
- "Tomorrow and Forever" - Chris, Selena
- "You’re Gonna Die Today, Brother" - A.B., Friends
- "Amame, Quiereme" - Suzette, Billy, Chorus
- "If Tomorrow" - Abraham
- "Dress Like Selena" - Suzette
- "The Fan Club/I Will Survive" - Los Sueños Del Pueblo and Selena
- "I Could Fall In Love" - Selena
- "The Fan Club" (Reprise) - Los Sueños Del Pueblo
- "Letters to Selena" - Women
- "The Next Morning" - José Behar
- "Dreaming of You" - Selena
- "Finale" - Company

== Cast ==
Character	Original tour	Revival	Description
Selena Quintanilla-Pérez	Veronica Vasquez	Veronica Vasquez	Central figure, a young Texas girl whose father discovers that she has an incredible singing voice. Her family includes her father, Abraham; her sister, Suzette; her brother, A.B.; and her mother, Marcella. She marries Chris Pérez and her fame grows. She is eventually shot by Yolanda Saldívar, an unseen character in the show.
Abraham Quintanilla, Jr.	Daniel Valdez	Mike Gomez	Central figure, Selena's overprotective but caring father. He discovers her captivating voice when she is nine, opens a restaurant and forms the band Selena y Los Dinos. When the restaurant fails, they get a bus and travel all over Texas performing. He is angered when he learns that Selena and Chris are married, but later accepts it and welcomes Chris.
Marcella Quintanilla	Margo Reymundo	Marta DuBois	Selena's trusting and lovable mother. When Selena is in a tight spot, Marcella comforts her, especially when she has problems with Abraham. She has always accepted Chris and Selena's getting together. She may get frustrated and angry with Abraham, but her love for him is true.
Chris Pérez	David Casavona	Aaron Lohr	Selena's husband. He originally joins the band as a replacement guitarist, but soon falls in love with Selena. After an argument with Abraham, Selena and Chris rebel and get married. Abraham later accepts that Chris is now part of the family.
A.B. Quintanilla	Maxx	Gabriel Gonzalez	Selena's brother, the bass guitarist for the band and the writer for most of her songs and music. He is the typical brother who watches out for his sisters. He becomes furious when he discovers Chris and Selena have married, telling Chris he is going "to die today".
Suzette Quintanilla	Liza Ybarra	Liza Ybarra	Selena's sister and the drummer for the band. She and Selena have a strong relationship, share secrets and help each other out. Suzette marries Billy soon after Selena and Chris get married. Suzette has always accepted Selena and Chris being together, but she is protective over her sister.
Young Selena	Denise Stefanie Gonzalez, Lorissa Chapa	Natalie Herra	Selena at age nine.

== Tour schedule ==
=== Original tour ===
Completed engagements

- San Antonio Municipal Auditorium: March 21 - March 26 (San Antonio, Texas)
- Music Hall at Fair Park: March 28 - April 2 (Dallas, Texas)
- Selena Auditorium: April 5 - April 7 (Corpus Christi, Texas)
- Don Haskins Center: April 13 - April 15 (El Paso, Texas)
- Jones Hall: April 18 - April 23 (Houston, Texas)
- Rosemont Theatre: April 25 - April 30 (Rosemont, Illinois)

Cancelled engagements

- Gammage Auditorium: May 2 - May 7 (Phoenix, Arizona)
- Wiltern Theatre: May 9 - May 14 (Los Angeles, California)
- Buell Hall: June 6 - June 11 (Denver, Colorado)
- San Diego Civic Center: June 13 - June 18 (San Diego, California)
- San Jose PAC: June 27 - July 2 (San Jose, California)

=== Revivals ===
- 2001 Doolittle Theatre: March 28 - November 12 (Hollywood, California)
