= Letter B =

Letter B may refer to:

- B, the second letter in the basic modern Latin alphabet
- USS Letter B (SP-732), a United States Navy patrol boat in commission from 1917 to 1919
- "Letter B", a song from Sesame Street parodying The Beatles' "Let it Be"

== See also ==
- Letter Bee, Tegami Bachi, a shonen manga
