= Nasty Dan =

Folk song

"Nasty Dan" is a folk song written by American composer Jeff Moss. It was first recorded and released by Johnny Cash in 1975, who performed the song for Oscar the Grouch on Sesame Street. A version of the song is on his 1975 album The Johnny Cash Children's Album.

Moss included a poem of the same name in his 1989 poetry book The Butterfly Jar: Poems.

Nasty Dan became a No. 1 hit in France in 1976 for Claude François, who recorded it with French lyrics under the title "Sale Bonhomme".
