= Melissa Harris-Perry (TV program) =

- Genre: Current affairs Political commentary
- Presented by: Melissa Harris-Perry
- Country of origin: United States
- Original language: English

Production
- Production location: New York City
- Running time: 120 minutes

Original release
- Network: MSNBC
- Release: February 18, 2012 – February 7, 2016

Melissa Harris-Perry (also abbreviated MHP) is a current affairs and political commentary television program produced by MSNBC and hosted by African-American author and academic Melissa Harris-Perry. The program was broadcast from 2012 to 2016, and normally aired on weekend mornings. Harris-Perry had previously been a contributor and guest host for the network before the show was announced. The first episode debuted on February 18, 2012.

During the running of the show, Melissa Harris-Perry commuted from North Carolina to New York City on the weekends to host, while she remained a professor at Wake Forest University.

In February 2016, the future of the show became unclear as the result of the eponymous host going on strike with MSNBC, given she said MSNBC has "silenced" the show. On February 28, 2016, MSNBC announced that they had cancelled Melissa Harris-Perry after 4 years on the air.

== Format ==
According to MSNBC, the program features panel discussions focusing on national politics while exploring the African-American "intersections of culture, art and community". The show's two-hour running time allows for a more diverse pool of guests, often new to being on-air compared to typical cable news programs. In addition, since the show airs on weekends, Harris-Perry says it has "a little bit more breathing room" to respond to the weekly news cycle.

Harris-Perry encourages viewers to interact with the show via Twitter using the #nerdland hashtag, which she uses to describe an occasional destination for its topic field and intensity of discourse.

The shows places a strong emphasis on pop culture in an effort to expand the idea of what is considered "political". Instead of political pundits, Harris-Perry often invites academics, activist Hollywood stars, struggling actresses, makeup ladies, and underrepresented voices as guests. In addition, she often discusses politics outside the beltway, including politics of the South.

== History ==
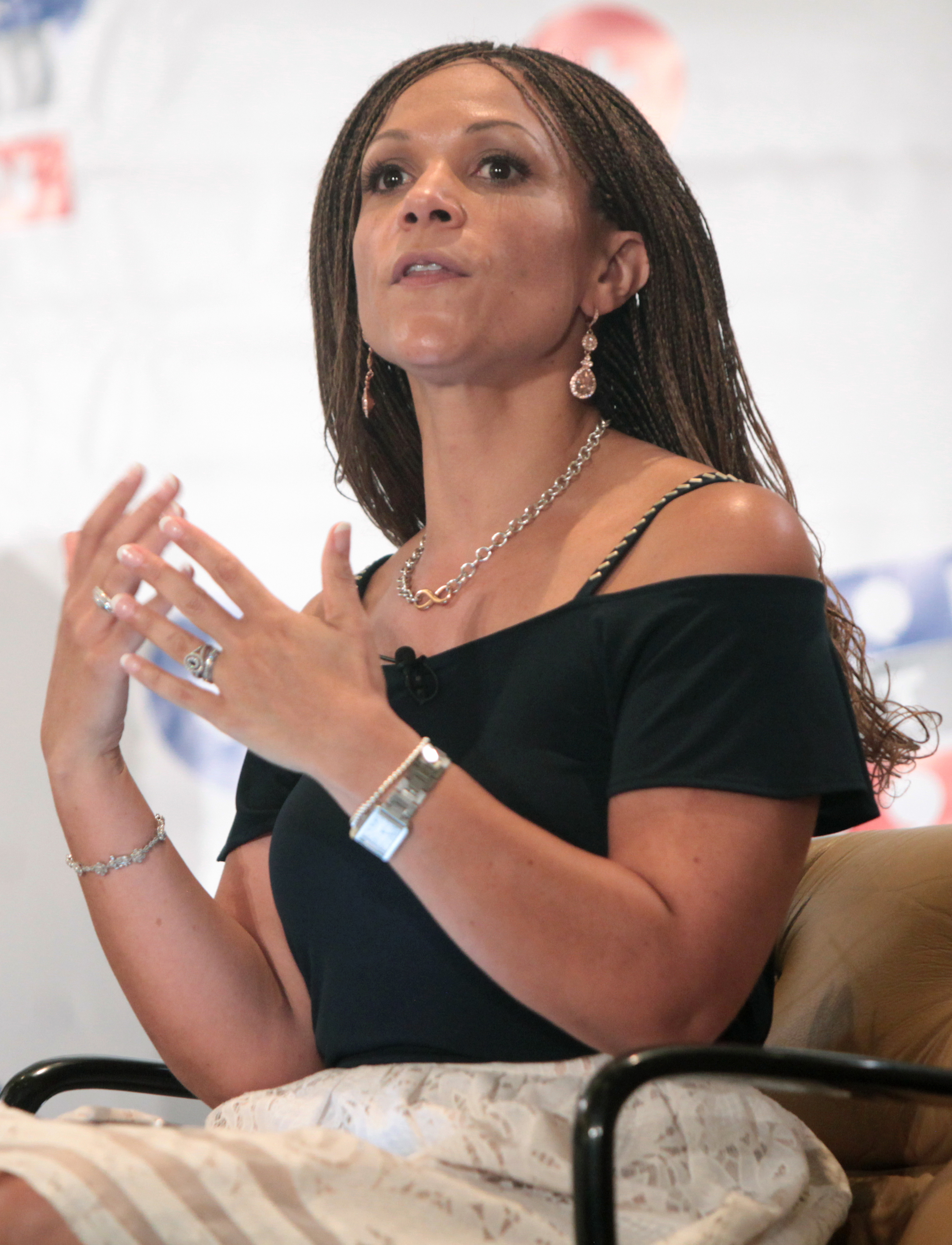
Melissa Harris-Perry.

Prior to the show's announcement, Melissa Harris-Perry had been appearing frequently as a political analyst on MSNBC. She had also guest-hosted prime-time programs The Rachel Maddow Show and The Last Word with Lawrence O'Donnell for the network. In January 2012, MSNBC announced that she would be hosting her own program as part of the network's weekend lineup. Harris-Perry credited Rachel Maddow for raising her profile on the network by making her a regular guest on The Rachel Maddow Show and then a guest host for the program. MSNBC president Phil Griffin described an episode of Maddow which she hosted in the summer of 2011 as "[p]henomenal honestly. Just jaw-dropping." Harris-Perry added: "more importantly, is the fact that Rachel exists that makes this possible. That she demonstrated so clearly that there is a ratings bonanza to be had for smart, a young woman who is not primarily there because she's adorable but is rather there because she is brilliant and has something to say about the news."

Harris-Perry remained a professor of political science at Wake Forest University and commuted to New York City every weekend to host the program. She remarked that, professionally, she is a "professor first", and accepted the opportunity to host the program because it didn't require her to give up teaching. Nonetheless, she admitted that switching to the academic-broadcaster schedule "really did blow up [her] entire life."

The show was originally scheduled to launch on February 4, 2012. The program's debut was pushed back two weeks, and the first episode aired on February 18.

During the show's run, Harris-Perry was one of the few African American women who had regular positions in cable news. She said she took her position as host "very seriously", and hoped to emulate other national figures such as Gwen Ifill and Soledad O'Brien.

On December 29, 2013, a picture was shown of former Republican presidential candidate Mitt Romney and his extended family. Romney was holding his adopted African-American grandchild. Harris-Perry and her guests, including actress Pia Glenn and comedian Dean Obeidallah, joked about coming up with captions for the photo. Glenn sang out, "One of these things is not like the others, one of these things just isn’t the same." Obeidallah said, "It sums up the diversity of the Republican Party and the Republican National Committee, where they have the whole convention and they find the one black person." Afterwards, Harris-Perry apologized in a series of Tweets and on msnbc.com, stating, "Without reservation or qualification, I apologize to the Romney family and to all families built on loving transracial adoptions". Romney replied, "I think it’s a heartfelt apology. I think for that reason, we hold no ill will whatsoever".

=== Cancellation ===
On February 26, 2016, Harris-Perry sent an email to the staff of the TV show stating that she would not be returning to host the show that weekend and possibly for the foreseeable future. She wrote that she felt the executives at MSNBC were silencing her show due to the numerous preemptions for special coverage of the 2016 presidential election and expressed frustration that she was being shut out of MSNBC's on-air coverage despite being highly qualified. She said that the show was scheduled to come back in its regular time slot, but there would be more time devoted to top news stories and breaking news rather than her team's own editorial content. Harris-Perry stated that she believed the only reason MSNBC was bringing the show back on air was due to people's comments on her notable absences. She wrote:

Here is the reality: our show was taken — without comment or discussion or notice — in the midst of an election season. After four years of building an audience, developing a brand, and developing trust with our viewers, we were effectively and utterly silenced. Now, MSNBC would like me to appear for four inconsequential hours to read news that they deem relevant without returning to our team any of the editorial control and authority that makes MHP Show distinctive.

On February 28, 2016, MSNBC announced that the show had been cancelled.

== Reception ==
Frances Martel of Mediaite noted Melissa Harris-Perry's discussion of cultural issues, and said the show's first episode "brought to the table conversations that are as important as they are interesting and achieved the most difficult thing in cable news today: it is unique." Ron Simon, a curator of TV and radio at the Paley Center for Media, said the show is a "nice counterpoint to the older, male-dominated shows you see on the weekends" and that Harris-Perry's influence may help open up the cable news landscape to a "multiplicity of voices".

According to ratings released in May 2012, the program showed "more growth in the time period than all other cable news programs combined," and was #1 in its time slot with ages 18–34.
