= Barretta =

Barretta is a surname. Notable people with the surname include:

- Bill Barretta (born 1964), American performer
- Gene Barretta (born 1960), American author, illustrator, animator, and character designer
- Larry Barretta, American football player
