= Denise Stefanie =

Mexican singer-songwriter, model and actress

- Born: Denise Stafanie González; 19 June 1988 (age 37); Tijuana, Mexico
- Occupations: Singer, Songwriter and Model

Denise Stefanie González (born June 19, 1988), known professionally as Denise Stefanie, is a Mexican singer-songwriter, model and actress.

== Early life ==
Gonzalez was born on June 19, 1988, in Tijuana, Mexico. Her father is an architect and her mother is a bronze sculptor. She is the middle of three children, with an older sister and a younger brother.

Gonzalez began singing in public at a very young age, with her first performance in front of a large audience at the age of five, singing the national anthem at the Lake Elsinore Storms baseball stadium.

She was the youngest student to have attended college at San Jacinto Community College, where she studied music at the age of nine.

At eleven, Gonzalez was invited to a national open audition for a new musical based on the life of the late Tejano singer, Selena Quintanilla, Selena Forever. Out of the many hopefuls, Gonzalez was picked as the lead "young Selena" and appeared on the Spanish television show Cristina, on Univision, to make the official announcement. Gonzalez and her mother moved to San Antonio, Texas, where the rehearsals for the national touring musical began. On March 21, 2000, the show premiered and started its 30-city tour across the United States.

During the tour, Gonzalez was invited to sing Schubert's "Ave Maria" a capella at the 2000 Tejano Music Awards in San Antonio in the famed Alamodome, where she received national praise for her performance from media outlets including the Los Angeles Times and Billboard magazine.

== Career ==
After a six-month run, Gonzalez returned to California, where she continued her musical studies and was offered a scholarship to attend one of Latin America's most renowned music conservatories, Conservatorio de las rosas in Morelia, Michoacán. After completing her summer courses, she returned to California and began opening shows throughout the state for well-known artists, including the Glenn Miller Orchestra, Martha and the Vandellas, Chaka Khan and Herb Jeffries.

Jeffries soon became Gonzalez's mentor and brought her into the world of jazz; she recorded her solo album at the age of 12. She began singing in jazz festivals such as the Sweet and Hot and Idyllwild Jazz Festival.

She was offered a full scholarship to Idyllwild Arts Academy as a full-time student. Shortly after she began her studies at the boarding arts school, she was offered the main character and singing role of Zoë, in Cirque du Soleil's production of Quidam. In January 2002, Gonzalez and her mother traveled to Montreal, Quebec, Canada to begin her training for the show. In March 2002, she arrived to Miami and was integrated into the live show. She continued to perform and travel with the show throughout the United States and Japan up until July 2003.

Gonzalez returned home and relocated to Los Angeles, California. She was put into a public high school where she finished her studies, then applied to university, eventually being accepted to Pepperdine University as a music major.

After completing her first year, Gonzalez was offered the singing role in Cirque du Soleil's production of Corteo. She worked on the show until December 2007.

In 2009 Gonzalez was chosen to be the face and voice of 7Up's national Hispanic campaign, Sevenisima. She recorded a commercial and three-minute music video. She also traveled throughout the United States doing promotional events on Hispanic TV Telemundo and Hispanic radio stations.

Gonzalez worked on an album with famed Mexican producer Gustavo Farias, although it was never released.

In 2010 she was invited to participate in City of Hope's project, La Gota de la Vida, along with other Latin artists including Gloria Estefan, Plácido Domingo, Enrique Iglesias, and Diego Verdaguer.

In 2011, Gonzalez modeled for several campaigns in Mexico and was on the cover of three national magazines.

She was put in contact with Neil Damy, founder of Mexican pop group MUHU, who was in search of a new vocalist. In October 2011 Gonzalez joined MUHU as the opening act for Julieta Venegas in Guadalajara's Stadium Benito Juarez.

In November 2011, Gonzalez was contacted again by Cirque du Soleil, this time for the role as the lead singer in their production, Alegria, By December 2011, Gonzalez was in Lisbon, Portugal, integrating into the show as both the white and black singer, alternating every show. The short contract came to an end in March 2012.

Returning from Alegria, Gonzalez began working with MUHU on their second studio album. She collaborated on the album by not only singing, but also by co-producing and co-writing. The album was released in 2013.

In 2019, she performed the lead singer role in the event show VITORI by Cirque du Soleil in Malta. It was the first time ever the compagny performed on that country, making Gonzalez the first Cirque du Soleil singer to perform there.

== Discography ==
Album name	Producer	Year	Genre	Status
Denise	Alfonso Gonzalez & Herb Jeffries	2000	Jazz	Released
Denise	Gustavo Farias	2009	Pop	Not released
"HOY" (single)	Muhu/No Mas Mellow Productions	2012	Pop	Released
Dirás Que Sí	Muhu/No Mas Mellow Productions	2013	Pop	Released
LA LA LU	Denise Stefanie & Mike Eckart	2017	Pop	Released

== Collaborations ==
Title	Artist	Year
"Summertime"	Herb Jeffries	2000
"Nuestor Amor"	Akwid	2010
"La Gota de la Vida"	Various	2010
"Ba Man"	2 Beat Band	2010
