= I Love Trash =

Song by Caroll Spinney (as Oscar the Grouch)
- Language: English
- Recorded: 1969
- Genre: Children's music
- Songwriter: Jeff Moss

"I Love Trash" is a song with music and lyrics by Jeff Moss. It was sung by the Muppet character Oscar the Grouch (performed by Caroll Spinney) on Sesame Street. The song was first sung in the first season of the series and has been re-taped several times.

In the song, Oscar sings about the trash he so admires; he presents a tattered and worn sneaker that's covered with holes and has torn laces ("A gift from my mother the day I was born..."), a 13-month old newspaper with smelly, cold fish wrapped inside (a piece of waste that Oscar affirms he "wouldn't trade for a big pot of gold"), a defective clock, an old telephone, a broken umbrella and a rusty trombone. In the end, Oscar claims to be "delighted to call them my own."

In a Season 29 episode, Oscar sang "Grouches Love Trash" a variation of this song to his niece Irvine. In episode 3891, his old friend Felix the Grouch sang a variation called "I Love Cleaning" while Oscar sang "I Love Trash". Yet another variation occurs when Oscar's trash can was grown to a larger size and the lyrics were adjusted to accommodate (a clip can be seen in Sesame Street All-Star 25th Birthday: Stars and Street Forever!).

Oscar sang this song in Here Come the Puppets!, accompanied by Bruno the Trashman on rollerskates. Oscar also sang the song during an appearance on The Bonnie Hunt Show. On September 26, 2013, Oscar and Big Bird sang this song on The Colbert Report.

== Other versions ==
k.d. lang sang this song when she guest-starred in The Jim Henson Hour episode about trash.

Grover, Telly and Zoe each sing a verse of the song (with changed lyrics to suit their interests) in the CD-ROM game The Three Grouchketeers.

Aerosmith frontman Steven Tyler recorded a new version for the album release of Elmopalooza. This version is also included on The Adventures of Elmo in Grouchland soundtrack album.

A brief portion of the song was also sung by a group of socks in Sesame Street 4-D Movie Magic, during Oscar's imagination sequence where Sesame Street is turned into a vast garbage dump.

On Plaza Sésamo, a Multimonstruo, who loves trash, performed a rock version of this song.

At the Jim Henson's Musical World concert on April 14, 2012, Elmo, Ernie, Bert, Cookie Monster, Gordon, Bob, Susan, Leela, Gina, Alan and Maria performed the song.

In an episode of Family Guy, Meg sings a very off-key version of the song dressed up as Oscar.

A Sesame Street segment features Oscar (now performed by Eric Jacobson) teaching Jack Antonoff (who comes in dressed as a "Grouch", wearing a tie with a tiny smudge) that Grouches like really messy, yucky stuff by singing this song.

Oscar and Josh Groban sang the song in an episode of The Not-Too-Late Show with Elmo.

San Jose, CA punk band Krupted Peasant Farmers covered the song for the Sesame Street tribute album 20 Bands Trash 20 Songs from Sesame Street.
