= Fernando Rivas =

Cuban-born composer

Fernando Rivas (born Havana, Cuba 1952) is a Cuban-American former composer and convicted sex offender. He graduated from the Juilliard School, where he studied with David Diamond. He has worked extensively in film and theater, as well as in broadcast media and advertising. Rivas has won several awards including the Princess Grace Foundation Grant and has composed fifteen musicals and hundreds of songs. His work was featured by the Theater Communications Group in a collaboration with Maria Irene Fornes and Tito Puente in Lovers and Keepers.

Rivas composed for Sesame Street for singers including Celia Cruz, Gloria Estefan and Cyndi Lauper, and sharing two Emmy award wins with the music team in 1994 and 1995. He also received an Emmy nomination for Music Composition and Direction in 1997. He was the composer along with Lyricist Nancy Sans of the song Mambo I, I, I sung by Gloria Esteworm (a parody of Gloria Estefan, voiced by Ivy Austin) on the 1997 album Hot! Hot! Hot! Dance Songs, and later by Gloria Estefan on the Grammy Award winning best Children's Album 1999 - Elmopalooza!. In 1997, along with Luis Santeiro, he received the Richard Rodgers Development Award for the piece Barrio Babies, which was produced by the Denver Center Theatrical Company. Rivas also composed a musical, Selena, Forever, with author Eddie Gallardo, based on the tragic life of the renowned Tejano singer, which premiered in San Antonio in 2000.

His poetry and short fiction began to be published on the Internet in several e-zines. He became a freelance contributor on music to the Charleston City Paper. From 2006 to 2010 he was the composer for the Disney Channel show 'Handy Manny'. In 2010 his work contributed to two Imagin Awards for Handy Manny and a special production for Nickolodeon. He was on the staff of the Fine Arts Department at Porter-Gaud School in Charleston until 2009 as Jazz Band director and has also collaborated with the Charleston Symphony Orchestra as an arranger and pianist under the late conductor David Stahl.

On April 19, 2011, the FBI and the North Charleston police raided Rivas' home in Ladson, South Carolina and found child pornography on his computers. In May 2011 he was released on house arrest on federal charges of production, transportation and possession of child pornography. The possession charge was dropped after Rivas entered a guilty plea for 'coercing a child to engage in explicit sexual conduct'. Rivas appeared in federal court in November to enter his plea. He had initially admitted to taking inappropriate pictures of a minor family member and sharing non-pornographic photos of the minor with two other men on the Internet. In September 2013 he was sentenced to the mandatory minimum sentence of 15 years in Federal Prison. He later appealed his sentence and conviction. His motion to vacate was denied in October 2014.

Refusing to remain silent and warehoused he continues to write music and words. While incarcerated at Ashland FCI (2013–2018) he taught creative writing for two years. He was written nine novels, 27 short stories and 156 poems. He has won acclaim and awards for his work, Honorable Mentions for poetry and stories from PEN America and the Insider's Prize for American Short Fiction. His poetry has been published by the Georgia State University 'Beyond Bars Journal' and the 'Mend' Journal from Syracuse University. His short stories have appeared in anthologies by Evening Street Press and PEN America. His poetry has also been published in the magazine 'Daughters' sponsored by the Let's Get Free organization, a partner of the California-based Critical Resistance group. In 2024 one of his essays, 'The Kennel', was included in an exhibition in Washington DC at the Lincoln cottage as part of the Presidential Portraits Reimagined exhibition which featured art and writings by incarcerated individuals. The exhibition will travel to other venues in 2025. He has written for the Marshall Project, Prison Journalism Project and several other prison reform organizations. Currently incarcerated at Seagoville FCI in Texas near the completion of his sentence (2025) he continues to participate full time in the Seagoville FCI prison music program raising awareness, lobbying for better equipment, arguing for the rehabilitative potential of music making and helping to add to and improve program resources. His poetry is available on the Minutes Before Six and the Justice Arts Coalition websites. His poetry book 'Prison/Prism' is available on Amazon.
