= Rubber Duckie =

1970 single by Jim Henson and Ernie

Single by Ernie (Jim Henson)

from the album The Sesame Street Book and Record
- B-side: "(Can You Tell Me How to Get to) Sesame Street"
- Released: 1970
- Recorded: 1970
- Genre: Children's, pop
- Length: 2:25
- Label: Columbia
- Songwriter: Jeff Moss
- Producer: Thomas Z. Shepard

"Rubber Duckie" is a song written by Jeff Moss, arranged by Joe Raposo and originally sung by Jim Henson who performed it as the Muppet character Ernie on the television program Sesame Street. The song is named after Ernie's toy, a rubber duck affectionately named Rubber Duckie.

The song's debut was on a Sesame Street episode which aired February 25, 1970. "Rubber Duckie" was popular enough to be recorded and released as a 45 rpm single and became a surprise mainstream hit, peaking at No. 16 on the Billboard Hot 100 on September 26, 1970, No. 10 in Australia and No. 11 on the New Zealand Listener Charts.

It was nominated for the Grammy Award for Best Recording for Children in 1971 but lost out to the album The Sesame Street Book & Record, which contained the song. The song was followed by other Sesame Street songs about Ernie and his rubber duck, including "Do De Rubber Duck", "D-U-C-K-I-E", "The Honker Duckie Dinger Jamboree", and 1988's "Put Down the Duckie", performed by Hoots the Owl but also featuring Ernie.

== Composition ==
The song is written in the key of B-flat major with a tempo of 75 BPM.

== Other recordings and performances ==
In 1971, one of The Irish Rovers sings the song on an episode of The Irish Rovers Show. Little Richard performed a rock-and-roll version of the song as a guest on a 1994 episode of Sesame Street. Bob McGrath recorded the song in his album Bob's Favorite Street Songs. The song made a brief appearance in a scene in Three Men and a Little Lady, and during an episode of Whose Line Is It Anyway? Daveed Diggs, in costume as Mr. Noodle's Brother Mr. Noodle, performed a hip-hop infused version on Sesame Street's YouTube channel and it's just like Shake a Tail Feather and When I See an Elephant Fly.

Little Richard also performed a rockabilly-tinged version of the song, which can also be found on Sesame Street's official YouTube channel.

Pianist Dick Wellstood included an instrumental performance of the song on his 1974 live album Walkin' with Wellstood. Jane Krakowski sings the song on her live album The Laziest Gal in Town (2010).

A 2017 re-recorded version of the song features guest appearances by Tori Kelly, James Corden, Sia, Jason Derulo, Anthony Mackie and Daveed Diggs.
