= One of These Things (Is Not Like the Others) =

Song on Sesame Street, an American educational television show

"One of These Things (Is Not Like the Others)" is the title song for one of the trademark segments in the children's television series Sesame Street. In it, the adult actor presented four items, three of which matched, and one that was different. The words of the song asked the children viewing the show to figure out which one "doesn't belong". At the end of the song, the actor presented the correct answer.

Invented by Joan Ganz Cooney, "One of These Things" appeared in the first-ever episode of the television show and in the original 1968 proposal for the show. It is one of the songs introduced by the founding musical director, Joe Raposo. Raposo wrote the music, and Jon Stone wrote the lyrics. It was once voted the 12th most popular Sesame Street song by Billboard.

== Concept ==
Example
banana	apple
orange	shoe

In addition to being a song, "One of These Things" was also a classification game. Early versions showed four letters or numbers on an easel; later versions used split screen technology to display videos. During the first verse of the song, children are encouraged to look at the items and decide which one was different from the others, rather than passively staring at the television. There is an eight-bar interlude followed by a verse asking whether they have guessed the answer. At the end of the song, the actor would provide the correct answer and encourage the children.

Children who watched the show regularly improved significantly in their ability to sort objects into like and unlike categories, and this improvement has been attributed in part to this song.

Encouraging the children to think about which answer was correct before being told the answer was a significant strategy for meeting the educational goals of the Children's Television Workshop, and "One of These Things" is a clear example of this approach. Presenting it as a puzzle to be solved by the children increased the amount of interaction. It also fit into their intended target audience, which was children who were watching television without an adult present to actively engage them in educational activities. Other segments on the show, including one in which James Earl Jones slowly recited the alphabet, also gave children an opportunity to repeat the correct answers given by the actors, or to give an answer and hear the actors confirm their correct choices.

As the song became familiar to children watching the show, the Community Education Services program of Children’s Television Workshop recommended that volunteers and educators encourage children to sing along with it.

The game was popular in the early decades of Sesame Street, but not in later decades. It has been speculated that its absence is due to changing social views about rejecting or ridiculing things that seem different. A successor was called "Three of These Things Belong Together".

== Cultural influence ==
The song has been invoked to recommend comparison or classification as a method of thinking about a situation or problem. This has been used in fields as diverse as public communications, automobile repair, philosophy, healthcare, and anti-terrorism planning.

The song is sometimes used as a cultural reference to suggest that someone is trying to be different. One actor reports that it was sometimes sung on movie sets, to signal that someone was out of place. It has been quoted in rulings issued by American judges. It has also been used to suggest that something has been judged inferior or improper, such as a poor decision in government, and even the choice of guest performers on Sesame Street.

== Other uses ==
The song has been used in auditions for Sesame Street cast members.

== See also ==
- List of Sesame Street recurring segments
