= Jeff Moss =

American composer

- Born: Jeff Moss; June 19, 1942; New York City, New York
- Died: September 25, 1998 (aged 56); Manhattan, New York City, New York
- Occupations: Composer; lyricist; writer
- Known for: writing songs for Sesame Street

Jeff Moss (June 19, 1942 – September 25, 1998) was an American composer, lyricist, playwright and television writer, best known for his award-winning work on the children's television series Sesame Street.

== Early life ==
Moss was born in New York City; his father, Arnold Moss, was a stage and screen actor, and his mother, Stella Reynolds, gave up acting to become a soap-opera writer. He attended the Browning School, a prestigious New York private school, and was first in his class.

He attended Princeton University and was a member of the Princeton Triangle Club theater company. After graduating in 1963, he took a job as a production assistant at the children's television show Captain Kangaroo. He also got an offer to work for CBS News, which he later said he had turned down because "I've seen the news."

== Sesame Street ==
In 1969, he became the first head writer, composer, and lyricist, for Sesame Street. He would eventually win fourteen Emmy Awards for his work on the show. Songs he wrote for its characters to sing include "I Love Trash", "People in Your Neighborhood", "I Don't Want to Live on the Moon" and "Rubber Duckie". "Rubber Duckie" became a surprise mainstream hit, reaching #16 on the Billboard Hot 100 in September 1970. Moss is also credited with, among other things, creating the character of Cookie Monster, based on a puppet Jim Henson had created called "Boogle Eyes".

Moss wrote the song "Nasty Dan", which Johnny Cash sang when he appeared on Sesame Street; it later appeared on the 1975 The Johnny Cash Children's Album. In 1976, the song became a #1 hit in France for Claude François, who recorded it with French lyrics under the title "Sale Bonhomme". In 1984, Moss wrote the music and lyrics for The Muppets Take Manhattan.

== Other works ==
In the late 1970s, Moss wrote Double Feature, a musical that received good reviews when it opened in New Haven, Connecticut. Moss worked with Mike Nichols and Tommy Tune, but when Moss became adamant about not implementing changes that Nichols wanted, Nichols and Tune walked out. The show opened off-Broadway to poor reviews in October 1981, and quickly closed.

Moss wrote many children's books, including The Butterfly Jar (1989), The Other Side of the Door (1991), Bob and Jack: A Boy and His Yak (1992), Hieronymus White: A Bird Who Believed That He Always Was Right (1994), The Dad of the Dad of the Dad of Your Dad (1997), and Bone Poems (1998). He also wrote some under the Sesame Street brand name, such as The Sesame Street Book of Poetry and The Sesame Street Songbook.

== Recognition ==
Moss won fourteen Emmy Awards, and in 1984, was nominated for an Academy Award for the music and lyrics he wrote for The Muppets Take Manhattan.

In 2007, Princeton University ranked Moss as one of its 26 most influential alumni, citing the effect of his songs and characters on the Sesame Street audience.

== Death ==
Moss was diagnosed with colorectal cancer in early January 1994, and died on September 25, 1998, at 56 years old. He was survived by his wife, Anne Boylan; his son, Alexander Moss; and his stepson, Jonathan Boylan Smith. Season 30 of Sesame Street was dedicated to his memory.

== See also ==
- Joe Raposo
