= Come Follow Me to the Greenwood Tree =

Nursery rhyme originating in the United States

"Come Follow Me to The Greenwood Tree"

Song
- Published: 1652
- Genre: Round, Children's song
- Songwriter: John Hilton

"Come Follow Me to the Greenwood Tree" (sometimes shortened to: Come Follow Me to the Greenwood) is a 17th century English language children's song by John Hilton (1599–1657).

== Origin ==
Come Follow Me to the Greenwood Tree was written as a three-part round by John Hilton. He later published it in "Catch that Catch Can" or "A Choice Collection of Catchers, Rounds and Canons for Three or Four Voices" in London in 1652.

== Lyrics ==
The original 17th century lyrics are as follows:

Come, follow, follow, follow, follow, follow, follow me,
Whith-er shall I follow, follow, follow, Whith-er shall I follow, follow, thee?
To the greenwood, to the greenwood, to the greenwood, greenwood tree.

The most common modern version is often sung as a round for four voice parts. A possible arrangement for SATB is as follows:

Soprano	Alto	Tenor	Bass
Come, follow, follow, follow, follow, follow, follow me,			
Where shall I follow, follow, follow.	Come, follow, follow, follow, follow, follow, follow me.		
Where shall I follow, follow, thee.	Where shall I follow, follow, follow, follow.	Come follow, follow, follow, follow, follow, follow, me.	
To the greenwood, to the greenwood, to the greenwood, greenwood tree.	Where shall I follow, follow, thee	Where shall I follow, follow, follow.	Come follow, follow, follow, follow, follow, follow, me.
	To the greenwood, to the greenwood, to the greenwood, greenwood tree..	Where shall I follow, follow, thee.	Where shall I follow, follow, follow.
		To the greenwood, to the greenwood, to the greenwood, greenwood tree.	Where shall I follow, follow,
			To the greenwood, to the greenwood, to the greenwood, greenwood tree.

The text above is often sung multiple times in succession to allow for the different voices to interweave with each other, forming four-part harmony.

== Pop Culture ==
The song was featured in an animated insert on Sesame Street, in which the three turtle kids teach their Uncle Edgar (the banjo playing turtle) about round singing. The title is a parody of the original as it uses "Redwood" in place of "Greenwood Tree".
