= Luis Santeiro =

American dramatist

- Born: October 9, 1947 (age 78); Havana, Cuba
- Education: Villanova University
- Occupations: Screenwriter, playwright
- Awards: Hispanic Achievement Award (1991); Hispanic Heritage Award (1993)

Luis Santeiro is a Cuban-American television screenwriter and playwright born in Havana, Cuba, in 1947.

== Biography ==
Santeiro left the island with his family at the age of twelve for Miami, Florida. He would complete a degree in sociology at Villanova University.

Santeiro first worked as a television writer for Carrascolendas, a bilingual children's television show that debuted in 1970 on the Austin, Texas, KLRN public television station. In 1976 he became head writer of the bilingual sitcom ¿Qué Pasa, USA?, produced by Miami's public television station WPBT. ¿Qué Pasa, USA? was a half-hour bilingual sitcom set in Miami's Cuban exile community that traced the lives of three generations of Cubans trying to make it in their new homeland. Running for five years, the show received six regional Emmys and nine special awards from the Association of Critics and Commentators on the Arts for its producers, directors, writers, and cast.

Santeiro wrote a total of 33 scripts for the show, including the pilot episode. In 1979 he joined the writing team of the children's television program Sesame Street. Santeiro also contributed scripts and song lyrics to other children's programs, such as 3-2-1 Contact, Big Bag, Oye, Willie, and Little Bill. For his writing for children's television programs, Santeiro has been nominated for 20 Daytime Emmy Awards and has won 14, 12 of these during his 29-year career with Sesame Street.

Santeiro is also recognized for his work as a playwright. Among his most notable plays are Our Lady of the Tortilla (1987), The Lady from Havana (1990), and The Rooster and the Egg (1994). For his musical Barrio Babies, Santeiro received the Edward Kleban and Richard Rodgers Award, and in 1995 was honored with the National Hispanic Academy of Media Arts and Sciences Award for his play A Royal Affair. Santeiro has also been recognized for his contributions to Latino arts and culture with honors such as the Hispanic Achievement Award (1991) and the Hispanic Heritage Award (1993).

He picked up the Leone in Memoriam award given to Tomas Milian at the 7º Almería Western Film Festival on October 11, 2017.

== Works or publications ==
- A Royal Affair. New York: Dramatists Play Service. 1995. OCLC 33490351.
- Land O'fire. New York: Dramatists Play Service. 2008. OCLC 263131903.
- Mixed Blessings. Alexandria, VA: Alexander Street Press. 2005. OCLC 304161244.
- Our Lady of the Tortilla. New York: Dramatists Play Service. 1991. OCLC 24797406.
- Praying with the Enemy. Alexandria, VA: Alexander Street Press. 2005. OCLC 304162353.
- The Lady from Havana. Alexandria, VA: Alexander Street Press. 2005. OCLC 593482240.
- The Lady from Havana : a Play in Two Acts. New York: Dramatists Play Service. 1991. OCLC 25176812.
