= Gene Barretta =

American writer

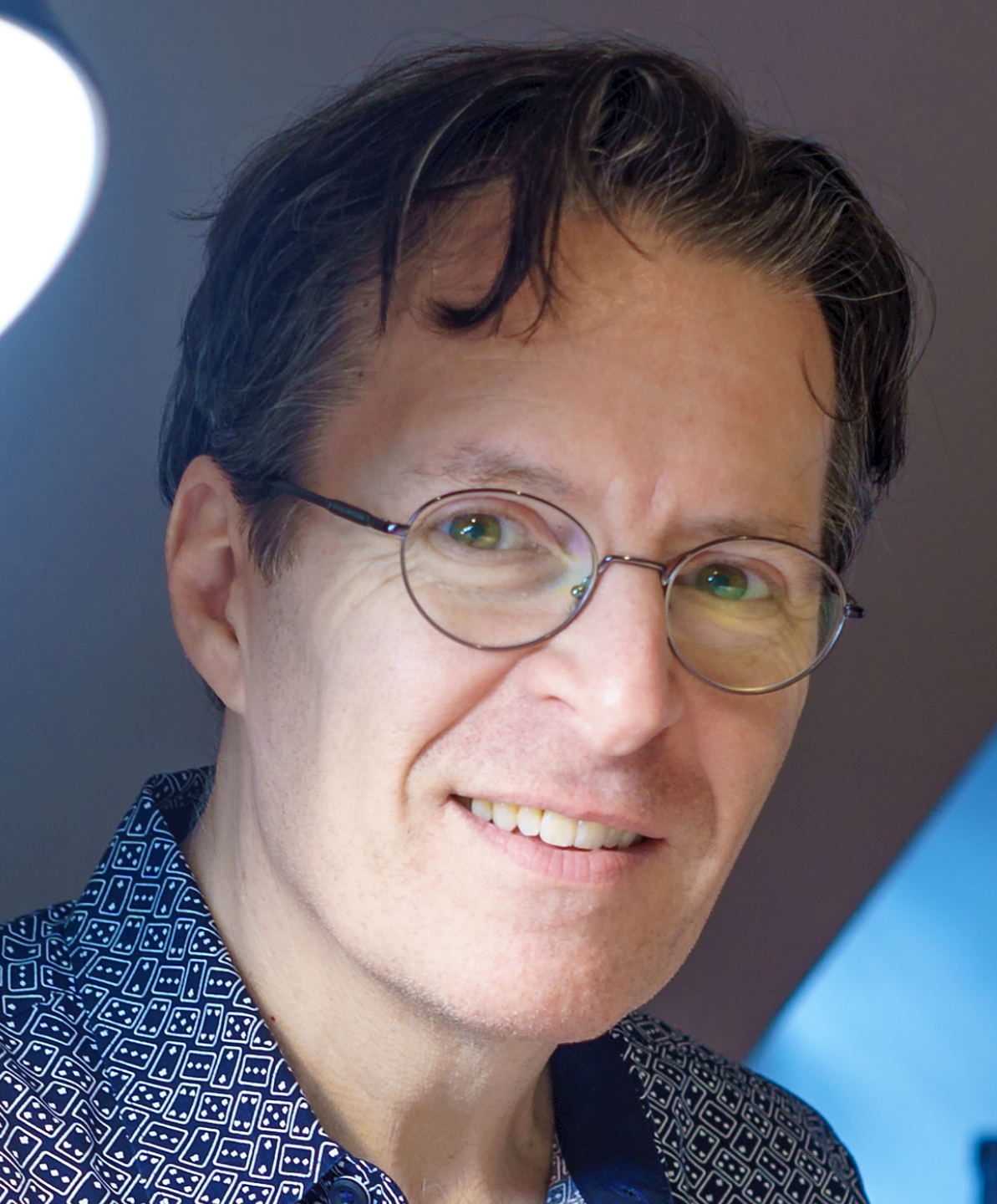
- Born: September 9, 1960 (age 66) Yardley, Pennsylvania, U.S.
- Areas: Illustration, writing, character design, animator
- Education: New York University
- Years active: 2000–present
- Relatives: Bill Barretta (brother)
- Website: www.genebarretta.com

Gene Barretta (born September 9, 1960) is an American children's book author and illustrator, animator and character designer.

Barretta graduated from Doane Academy in 1978 and was the school's commencement speaker in 2017. He graduated from New York University: Tisch School of Arts with a BFA in film studies. He currently lives with his son outside of Philadelphia. Gene is also the older brother of Muppet performer, writer and director, Bill Barretta.

== Bibliography ==
=== Books ===
Gene began illustrating mass-market and novelty books in 2000 and eventually transitioned to picture books into 2003. He has also contributed to children's magazines such as Cobblestone, Odyssey, Faces and Appleseeds.

Picture books include:

- The Apprenticeship of Andrew Wyeth: Painting a Family Legacy - (Christy Ottaviano Books/Little, Brown & Co. - Fall 2025)
- Starring Steven Spielberg: The Making of a Young Filmmaker - (Christy Ottaviano Books/Little, Brown & Co. - Fall 2022)
- The Secret Garden of George Washington Carver - (HarperCollins - Winter 2020)
- The Bat Can Bat: A Book of True Homonyms - (Henry Holt & Co.- Winter 2018)
- Muhammad Ali: A Champion is Born - (HarperCollins - Winter 2017)
- Lincoln and Kennedy - (Henry Holt & Co. - Summer 2016)
- Conrad and the Cowgirl Next Door - Illustrator. Written by Denette Fretz. (Zonderkids - Fall 2014)
- Pirates on the Farm - Illustrator. Written by Denette Fretz. (Zonderkids - Summer 2013)
- Timeless Thomas: How Thomas Edison Changed Our Lives - Author/Illustrator. (Henry Holt & Co. - Summer 2012)
- The Bass Plays the Bass: A Book of Homographs – Author/Illustrator. (Henry Holt & Co. - Summer 2011)
- Neo Leo: The Ageless Ideas of Leonardo Da Vinci – Author/Illustrator. (Henry Holt & Co. - Fall 2009)
- Sheetzucacapoopoo: Max Goes to the Dogs – Illustrator. Written by Joy Behar. (Dutton – Spring 2009)
- Jack the Tripper (Harcourt - Fall 2008)
- Dear Deer: A Book of Homophones - Author/Illustrator. (Henry Holt & Co. - Fall 2007)
- Sheetzucacapoopoo: My Kind of Dog – Illustrator. Written by Joy Behar. (Dutton - Fall 2006)
- Now & Ben: The Modern Inventions of Benjamin Franklin - Author/Illustrator. (Henry Holt & Co. - Spring 2006)

=== TV and film ===
- The Jim Henson Company: Character Designer for projects such as, Tinseltown and The Late Night Buffet with Augie and Del. Storyboard artist on Muppets from Space.
- Sesame Street: Animated, wrote and scored 5 short films for Seasons 28–29.
- Between the Lions: Illustrated five BTL books as well as several production illustrations.

=== Awards ===
- 2017 - Carolyn W. Field Honor Book Award Pennsylvania Library Association for "Lincoln & Kennedy."
- 2013 - The Cook Prize Honor Title from Bank Street College of Education for "Timeless Thomas: How Thomas Edison Changed Our Lives."
- 2007 - Carolyn Field Award for Pennsylvania Library Association for "Now & Ben."

=== Selected honors ===
- 2026 - The Apprenticeship of Andrew Wyeth was named to the Keystone to Reading Elementary Book Award List by KSLA (Keystone State Literacy Association)
- 2025 - School Library Journal awarded “The Apprenticeship of Andrew Wyeth” a Starred Review
- 2023 - “Starring Steven Spielberg” nominated for a 2023-24 Keystone to Reading Elementary Book Award by Keystone State Literacy Association
- 2022 - School Library Journal awarded “Starring Steven Spielberg” a STARRED REVIEW
- 2022 - "Timeless Thomas" received an award for Barnes & Noble's STEAM/STEM Books for 6-8 Year Olds
- 2021 - "The Secret Garden of George Washington Carver" nominated for a 2021 NAACP Image Award
- 2020 - "The Secret Garden of George Washington Carver" and "Muhammad Ali: A Champion is Born" included in Book Riot's list of “52 Incredible Picture Book Biographies of Black People Creating and Learning.”
- 2020 - "The Secret Garden of George Washington Carver" included in Texas Bluebonnet Award Master List 2021–2022
- 2020 - "The Secret Garden of George Washington Carver" included in SLJ article, “#BlackinSTEM: 17 Nonfiction Books That Spotlight Black Scientists, Thinkers, and Inventors.”
- 2019 - "The Secret Garden of George Washington" Carver awarded a Starred Review from Booklist
- 2019 - "The Secret Garden of George Washington Carver" awarded a Starred Review from School Library Journal
- 2017 - Children's Book Council included "Lincoln & Kennedy" on its 2017 NCSS Notable Social Studies Trade Books List!
- 2016 - Invited to speak twice at the 92Y in New York
- 2016 - "Sky High: George Ferris' Big Wheel" is nominated for a 2016 CYBIL Award
- 2016 - "Lincoln and Kennedy" is mentioned among the NY Public Library's list of 100 Best Kids Books of 2016.
- 2014 - "Now & Ben" included in Best Books for Grades 3–5 by WeAreTeachers.com
- 2014 - "Neo Leo" and "Timeless Thomas" chosen by Teaching Books for the 2014 Collaborative Summer Library Program themed "Fizz, Boom, Read!"
- 2013 - "Pirates on the Farm" receives a Starred Review from Publishers Weekly."
- 2013 - "Timeless Thomas" receives a Starred Review from Kirkus."
- 2013 - "Timeless Thomas" featured on the 2013 NEA Calendar."
- 2012 - "Zoola Palooza" included on 2012 IRA Teacher's Choice Reading List.
- 2011 - "Zoola Palooza" chosen among Amazon's Best Books of the Month for June.
- 2010 - NSTA/CBC Outstanding Science Trade Book for Students K-12 list for "Neo Leo."
- 2010 - Teacher's Choice Booklist by the International Reader's Association for "Neo Leo."
- 2009 - Scholastic Instructor's Magazine's "First-Rate Biographies" for "Neo Leo."
- 2008 - "Notable Children's Videos" by ALSC (American Library Assoc) for the DVD of "Now & Ben."
- 2008 - Notable Children's Book in the Language Arts by The National Council of Teachers of English (NCTE) for "Dear Deer."
- 2007 - CCBC Choices of 2007 "Now & Ben."
- 2007 - Best Children's Books of the Year list by the Children's Book Committee at the Bank Street College of Education for "Now & Ben."
- 2007 - Notable Social Studies Trade Books for Young Readers by The National Council for Social Studies (NCSS) and the Children's Book Council for "Now & Ben."
- 2007 - Mom-Tested Books of the Year in "Parenting" magazine for "Dear Deer."
- 2006 - The New York Times Best Seller list – #3 for "Sheetzucacapoopoo: My Kind of Dog."
- 2006 - Book Sense Top Ten History Picks About The American Revolution for "Now & Ben."
