= Oscar the Grouch =

Muppet character on the television program Sesame Street

- Sesame Street character
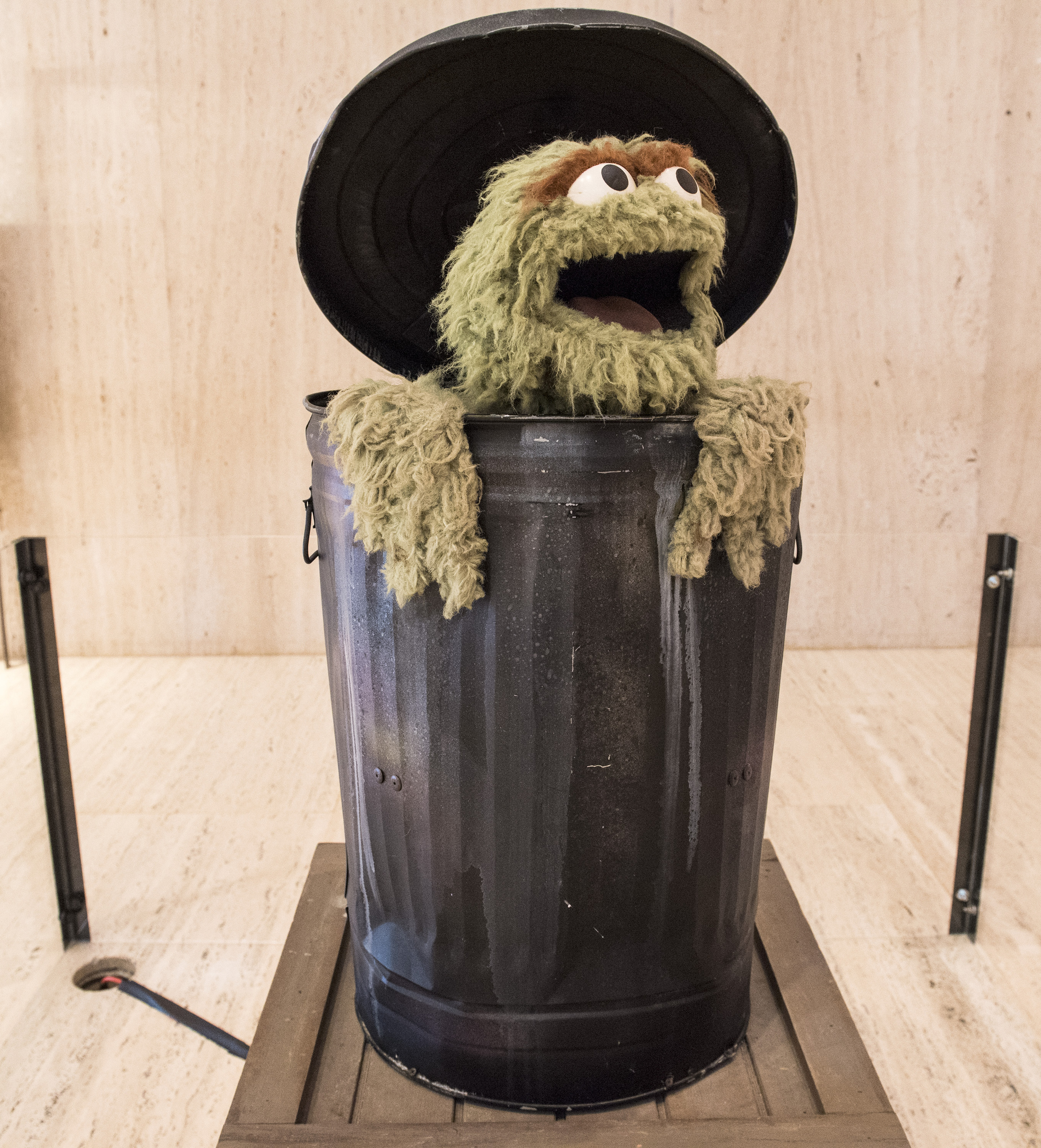
- An Oscar the Grouch puppet on display at LBJ Presidential Library exhibition in 2017
- First appearance: Gordon introduces Sally to Sesame Street (November 10, 1969)
- Created by: Jim Henson; Jon Stone
- Performed by: Caroll Spinney (1969–2018); Eric Jacobson (2015–present)

In-universe information
- Aliases: Oskie (Grundgetta's pet name for him); Son (by his mother); Mr. Oscar; Mr. Grouch
- Species: Grouch
- Gender: Male
- Significant other: Grundgetta (girlfriend)
- Nationality: Grouchland

Oscar the Grouch is a Muppet character created by Jim Henson and Jon Stone for the children's television program Sesame Street. He has a green body, no visible nose, and lives in a trash can. Oscar's favorite thing is trash, as evidenced by the song "I Love Trash", with a running theme being his collection of seemingly useless items. Although the term "grouch" aptly describes Oscar's misanthropic interaction with the other characters, it also refers to his species. The character was originally performed by Caroll Spinney, from the show's first episode until his retirement. Eric Jacobson became understudy for the character in 2015, and in 2018 officially became the primary performer of the role following Spinney's retirement.

== Origins ==
The original version of Oscar's puppet used from season 1 up until season 2

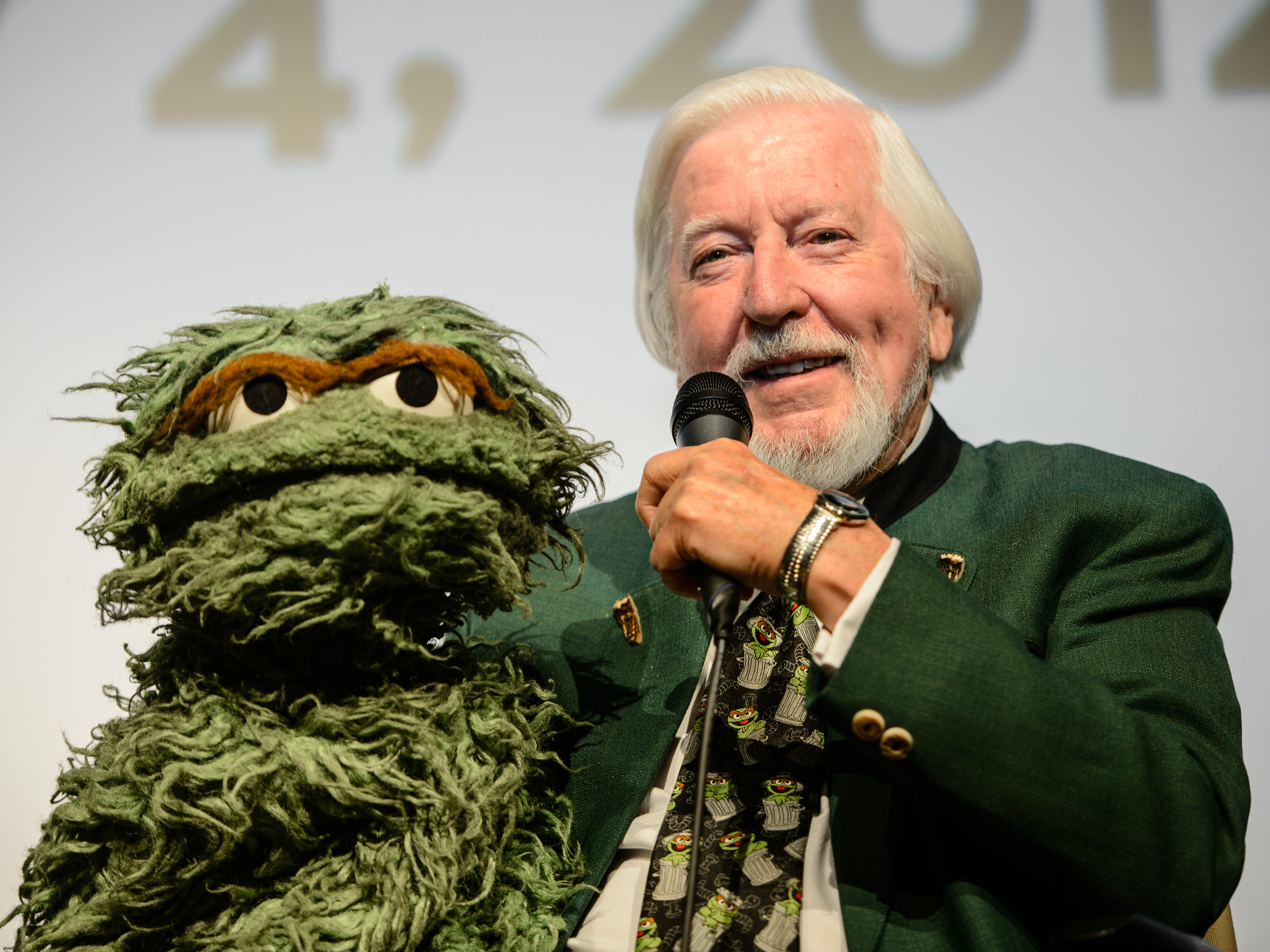
Spinney with Oscar the Grouch at the 2014 Montclair Film Festival

Initially, the puppet characters on Sesame Street did not appear on the actual Sesame Street set, but were relegated to the intermediary segments. Muppets creator Jim Henson wanted them to be integrated into the series, suggesting a giant bird and also a creature living in the neighborhood's trash can. The character was developed by Sesame Street head writer Jon Stone and Henson. Puppeteer Caroll Spinney found inspiration for the voice in the driver of a New York City taxi he took to the studio. His first line was, "Where to, Mac?".

Henson credits the character's name based on the personality of a "magnificently rude" restaurant owner and namesake of Oscar's Salt of the Sea which Henson and Stone frequented. Henson's office was on East 67th Street, just around the corner from Oscar's Salt of the Sea on Third Avenue. In the early 1960s, Henson and Stone often had lunch there and observed that the owner, Oscar Karp, dressed in black, looked unkempt, and had a gruff disposition.

The Oscar muppet was orange for the first season of Sesame Street and then changed to green, which remained his permanent color. This was explained within the show by a visit to Swamp Mushy Muddy.

According to Sesame Street's Robert W. Morrow, Oscar was created to indirectly demonstrate racial and ethnic diversity. Since his manners and tastes were different from those of the other characters, his creators hoped to address social issues by using his differences as a metaphor for racial and ethnic differences. Some viewers saw Oscar as a "surrogate for poor, urban Americans" during the show's early seasons. In the early Sesame Street development there was criticism that Oscar represented residents of inner city who had grown to accept injustice unchallenged, whilst other observers perceived Oscar to be a negative impression of African-Americans even though the members Sesame Workshop did not intend the character to be a representation of black people. Joan Ganz Cooney was confused by this viewpoint when journalist Linda Francke informed her of its existence.

== Performing Oscar ==
During the first season of Sesame Street, the street set was arranged in such a way that Spinney, who was right-handed, was forced to operate Oscar's head with his left hand. After the set was redesigned, Spinney was able to switch hands.

In scenes where Oscar and Big Bird (both performed by Spinney) interact together, the situation has varied depending on the number of lines one or the other is given. When Spinney performed Big Bird, a second puppeteer operated Oscar to Spinney's vocals; occasionally, Matt Vogel instead operated the Big Bird puppet to a vocal track by Spinney, who in turn performed Oscar. Other Oscar puppeteers have included Jerry Nelson and Jim Martin.

In 2015, due to being diagnosed with dystonia, Spinney no longer puppeteered Oscar (or Big Bird) full-time on the show. Eric Jacobson became his understudy; often lip-syncing to a prerecorded vocal track by Spinney, and other times doing the voice himself. Spinney continued to provide Oscar's voice on the series for seasons 46 and 47, as well as select commercials, online videos, and the special Once Upon a Sesame Street Christmas. Afterwards, Spinney entered semi-retirement, and Jacobson fully assumed the role. Despite this, Spinney continued to receive onscreen credit for playing the characters through season 50.

On October 17, 2018, Spinney announced his official retirement from both his characters. The following day, he recorded his final performances as Oscar the Grouch and Big Bird as part of episode 5022 for the series' landmark 50th anniversary, though the recordings were ultimately unused. Spinney's final vocal performance as Oscar the Grouch to air was for episode 4731.

== Attributes ==
Oscar can also become mobile with the help of his friend Bruno the Trashman, who carries Oscar around in his trash can. Bruno is a full-body costume which allows Oscar's puppeteer to manipulate Oscar while remaining hidden by the Bruno costume. Bruno's tenure on the show lasted from 1979 to 1993. Also, as seen in the Elmo's World episode "Dance", Oscar's legs can protrude from the bottom of his trash can to allow him to walk around. Similarly, in Christmas Eve on Sesame Street (1978), Oscar is seen ice skating. For several seasons, Oscar was frequently shown with his friend and pet Slimey, an orange worm. On occasional episodes he has mentioned leaving Sesame Street to attend "the annual Grouch convention in Syracuse, New York".

Oscar openly admits that he does not like anything or anybody that is nice, except young human children (the only people that he can actually act nice to without facing ridicule from his fellow Grouches) as well as older fans of the show. The only person he liked on camera was Maria, which he would never admit. He once inadvertently complimented a dance that his followers, The Grouchketeers, had performed for him. Oscar has shown rare acts of kindness such as trying to replace Ernie's rubber duckie when Ernie had lost it. He also went out to find the missing Big Bird in "Christmas Eve on Sesame Street". He and his girlfriend Grundgetta also love each other, though their relationship is somewhat rocky.

== Oscar's trash can ==
While appearing to be the size of a normal trash can on the outside, Oscar's trash can is much bigger on the inside, as revealed in The Adventures of Elmo in Grouchland. Oscar has said it holds a farm, swimming pool, ice rink, bowling alley, and piano. Other items include his pet worm Slimey, his pet elephant Fluffy, his shoes, a backdoor and a gate to Grouchland USA, his hometown.

== International adaptations ==
While Oscar receives new names in international dubs, Sesame Street international co-productions have often created their own version of the character.

In their second season, Germany's Sesamstrasse created an antagonistic character named Uli von Bödefeld. While not a Grouch, he served the same role in plots as Oscar. When a fire destroyed the costume in 1988, a decade after he debuted, he and American segments of Oscar were both replaced by a Grouch named Rumpel. He has a pet caterpillar named Gustav, who is based on Slimey.

Israeli Grouch, Moishe Oofnik, Oscar's cousin, is the only character to survive the first Rechov Sumsum, appearing in its current reboot; English/Hebrew series Shalom Sesame; and Israeli-Palestinian co-production Rechov Sumsum/Shara'a Simsim.

Other Grouches include Bodoque on Mexico's Plaza Sésamo, Pancho Contreras, technically a monster, on US Spanish version, Gugu on Brazil's Vila Sesamo, Kırpık on Turkey's Susam Sokağı, Ferrão on Portugal's Rua Sésamo, and Kewal Khadoosa on India's Galli Galli Sim Sim. Filipino adaptation Sesame! featured Kiko Matsing, basically a gorilla; also ATBP featured Bebong (The Trashed Monster).

Some Grouches differ from the mostly antagonistic mold. France's 1, Rue Sésame featured Mordicus, who, like Oscar, lives in a trash can, and is slightly cynical, but is also described as lively and enthusiastic, and participated in the neighborhood band.

In Pakistan, he is named Akhtar and lives in a rusty oil barrel.

== Appearances in other media ==
A hybrid of Oscar the Grouch, Ernie, and Cookie Monster appears in The Goodies episode "The Goodies Rule – O.K.?", where it attacked Tim Brooke-Taylor whilst in a bin, only for Tim to eat it.

Oscar made what he called "a very brief cameo" in the 1981 Jim Henson movie The Great Muppet Caper. When Miss Piggy threw a truck driver (played by Peter Ustinov) into a pile of boxes and a pile of trash cans, Oscar emerged from his trash can and demanded "Hey, what's all the racket?" He additionally appears in the crowd shots of both The Muppet Movie and The Muppets Take Manhattan.

Oscar also appeared in the Jim Henson holiday special, A Muppet Family Christmas, when the Sesame Street Gang comes to the Grizzly Farm House for the holidays. In the film he befriends Rizzo the Rat who asks the Grouch if he could stay in his trash can for the night. Oscar agreed saying that he never had a rat in his trash can before.

Oscar could be seen among many villains in the South Park episode "Imaginationland Episode III".

Oscar appears in the episode "Fashion" of the IFC show Portlandia.

Oscar was on an episode of Scrubs, imagined as the new chief of medicine.

Oscar is one of numerous PBS personalities chasing after Homer Simpson for not being able to pay a pledge in a Simpsons season 11 episode, "Missionary: Impossible". Oscar crashes through the window of the church Homer is hiding in, and demands the money while Elmo, who was hiding in the trash can with him, tells Homer he knows where he lives. He also appears in "Trash of the Titans", a season 9 episode of The Simpsons.

Oscar inspired an Apple Macintosh INIT written by Eric B. Shapiro and shown at the 1989 MacHack conference, featuring a singing animated Oscar that appeared from the trash can when the trash was emptied. The hack was so popular that some parents lost the entire contents of their hard disks to preschoolers wanting to see more of Oscar, prompting Shapiro to create a stand-alone application using the same animation and sounds. The software was discontinued after Children's Television Workshop sent Shapiro a cease and desist letter.

The fumetti comic Twisted Toyfare Theatre once featured Oscar in an issue in which he sings a variation of his "I Love Trash" song about Wesley Snipes' movies. In the end, Snipes (as Blade) decapitates him.

Oscar appeared on seven episodes of the game show 1 vs. 100, which aired between January and February 2008.

Beginning in 2008, Oscar became the mascot for Waste Reduction Week in Canada, an environmental campaign.

In The Grim Adventures of Billy & Mandy episode "Scythe for Sale", a parody of Oscar emerges from a dumpster telling Billy to "get outta my house" and a car then crashes into his dumpster. The man in the car and "Oscar" then instruct the viewers that it is wrong to play with scythes (in response to Irwin's stealing and misuse of Grim's scythe) and to "tell an adult immediately" if they find one.

In the Night at the Museum sequel Night at the Museum: Battle of the Smithsonian, Oscar has an appearance with Darth Vader, trying to become part of Kahmunrah's team—only to be discovered that he is not evil, just "vaguely grouchy". The Oscar puppet that was used in filming is on display at the Smithsonian National Museum of American History.

On May 29, 2009, Oscar the Grouch appeared in an ABC television special on economics called Un-broke: What You Need to Know About Money. He appeared showing the viewers what investing stocks means. It is shown that he has investment filings with Lehman Brothers, Worldcom, Enron, and Washington Mutual even though they are bankrupt companies, but he then says that they are not really his filings. The press kit for the special reveals that Oscar was popular with the crew for the special even during filming.

On October 11, 2009, Oscar appeared on the CBC Radio One show Q, hosted by Jian Ghomeshi. Beyond talking about his time on Sesame Street, his love for trash and recycling, Oscar revealed that his father is actually from Saint David, New Brunswick and his mother grew up in Nova Scotia, thus making him of Canadian descent. He further went on to suggest that he had cheated on Grundgetta, his long-time girlfriend.

On November 12, 2009, Oscar appeared on CNN to celebrate the 40th anniversary of Sesame Street. In an interview with Anderson Cooper, Oscar reveals that he would still be orange if he bathed; his green exterior is apparently moss.

On an episode of Cake Boss, Buddy and his bakers visited Sesame Street, and Danny could be seen inside Oscar's trash can. He tries his best Oscar impression by saying "I live in the trash." Oscar can also be seen at the end when Buddy reveals his cake, but then goes back in his trash can, ostensibly to get away from the laughing and cheering.

Oscar also made appearances in episodes of the Cartoon Network show MAD.

On a Q TV interview promoting the benefits of being "[Eco-]Green", Oscar suggests that he is actually Canadian. He later mentions that his favorite dessert is spinach sardine chocolate fudge sundaes. His second favorite dessert is mashed bananas with ice cubes and cold beef gravy, and in Season 12, he owns a car called "The Sloppy Jalopy".

The October 12, 2019 episode of season 45 of Saturday Night Live, hosted by David Harbour, included a sketch presenting the origin story of Oscar the Grouch in a Joker spoof.

In 2023, Oscar the Grouch was appointed the Chief Trash Officer of United Airlines' Sustainable Airline Fuel (SAF) program.

In the 9th season of Masked Singer, Oscar featured, alongside other Sesame Street characters, as a guest during "Sesame Street Night".

Supporters of the striking workers in the 2025 Birmingham bin strike have displayed images of Oscar the Grouch with a raised fist in solidarity during the dispute. British union organiser Scott Walker dressed as the character at the 2025 Labour Party Conference, in support of the strike, and joined a demonstration in costume later that year.

Oscar made a cameo appearance during the finale of The Amazing Race 38 in New York City as a clue giver.

In December 2025, the Metropolitan Transportation Authority broadcast public service announcements voiced by Oscar the Grouch in New York City Subway stations, notifying passengers about the retirement of the MetroCard and its replacement with the OMNY fare-payment system.
