= List of Between the Lions episodes =

This is the list of episodes for the PBS children's program Between the Lions, which aired from April 3, 2000, to November 22, 2010, with a one-year hiatus in 2004.

== Series overview ==
Season	Episodes	Originally released	
Season	Episodes	First released	Last released
1	30	April 3, 2000	May 12, 2000
2	25	April 2, 2001	May 4, 2001
3	10	September 16, 2002	November 18, 2002
4	5	September 15, 2003	September 19, 2003
5	10	April 18, 2005	June 21, 2005
6	10	April 17, 2006	June 19, 2006
7	10	September 17, 2007	November 19, 2007
8	10	September 15, 2008	November 17, 2008
9	10	September 21, 2009	November 23, 2009
10	10	September 20, 2010	November 22, 2010

== Episodes ==
=== Season 1 (2000) ===
No. overall	No. in season	Title	Original release date
1	1	"Pecos Bill Cleans Up the West"	April 3, 2000
The lions read and sing a story about legendary cowboy Pecos Bill and how he managed to catch and tame a tornado. Inspired by the story, Lionel and Leona ask Click to bring Pecos out of the book to show them how it's done. Unfortunately, Click not only brings Pecos out of the book, but the tornado as well. Pecos sadly admits to the cubs that he can't stop the tornado from trashing the library because he's a fictional character, but this inspires the lions to solve the problem by writing a new story about how Pecos saves the library. Book read: How Pecos Bill Cleaned Up the West: A Tall Tale by Beth Western Sponsors: Short E
2	2	"The Lost Rock"	April 4, 2000
A talking rock (whom Leona names "Larry") ends up hurling himself into the library. The rock mentions that he comes from one of the library's books, but as a result of hitting his head so much, he's forgotten which book he comes from. After learning about what little he does remember from his book, the lions try to help "Larry" find his way back home. Sponsors: Short O
3	3	"Little Big Mouse"	April 5, 2000
When the lions read Aesop's fable "The Lion and the Mouse", Lionel and Leona applaud the mouse's saving the lion, write her large amounts of fan mail, and even start a fan club for her. In the process, Click begins to feel left out and leaves the library. But when Cleo enters the book and ends up captured by hunters, it's up to Click to save her. Book read: The Lion and the Mouse by Aesop Sponsors: Short I
4	4	"Farmer Ken's Puzzle"	April 6, 2000
Lionel is eager to play his new computer game with Walter and Clay, where he must get a cat, a hen, and a bag of seeds to the other side of a river. Thanks to the pigeons' lack of intelligence and the overall difficulty of the puzzle, he gets increasingly frustrated. In the end, Leona tries the puzzle herself and solves it perfectly. Sponsors: Short E
5	5	"Shooting Stars"	April 7, 2000
The lions stay up late one night hoping to watch a meteor shower, but they find it increasingly hard to stay awake. In the meantime, Leona confuses the meteor shower for a meat shower, even writing a book about herself and her family dancing under a rain of meat. Book read: The Night of the Shooting Stars by Arlis Parknark Sponsors: A R
6	6	"The Hopping Hen"	April 10, 2000
Theo and Cleo have printed signs displaying new rules to be hung up around the library. However, due to the printer not including the "no's" on the signs, chaos promptly ensues. Note: The word is found in a Fred Newman segment in this episode Sponsors: Short E
7	7	"Touching the Moon"	April 11, 2000
When Leona is unable to sleep, Cleo reads her a story about a queen on a tropical island who dreams of touching the Moon. Instead of putting her to sleep, the story causes Leona to grow obsessed with wanting to touch the Moon herself, despite how badly the queen's attempt ended up. Book read: The Queen Who Wanted to Touch the Moon retold by Hootie Kaboodle Sponsors: Long O (Double O)
8	8	"The Boy Who Cried Wolf"	April 12, 2000
The star player of Aesop's fable "The Boy Who Cried Wolf" is left a nervous wreck when the townspeople want him to watch their sheep. To help him out, Lionel and Leona bring him out of the book and take him through the library to search for a book about how to watch sheep. When he ends up learning not to cry wolf by memorizing and singing a song, the boy ends up getting carried away while singing it, and learns the hard way not to cry wolf so often. Book read: The Boy Who Cried Wolf by Aesop Sponsors: Short I
9	9	"Fuzzy Wuzzy, Wuzzy?"	April 13, 2000
Leona begs Lionel to read her the "Fuzzy Wuzzy" nursery rhyme from her Fuzzy Wuzzy book. After he does so, Fuzzy Wuzzy himself brings the book to life. Everyone in the library becomes ecstatic with Fuzzy Wuzzy around, repeating his rhyme endlessly and causing an aggravated Lionel to find a quiet place to read. Book read: The Fuzzy Fuzzy Wuzzy Book illustrated by Buffy Huckabuck Sponsors: Short U
10	10	"Lionel's Antlers"	April 14, 2000
Lionel wakes up one day to find that a pair of antlers has grown on his head. After begging his family to help get them off, they offer to calm Lionel down by reading him a story about a young girl who went through a similar situation. At the end, it was actually a dream by Leona. Book read: Imogene's Antlers by David Small Sponsors: Short A
11	11	"To the Ship! To the Ship!"	April 17, 2000
Lionel and Walter pretend to be pirates after reading a story about them. Problems soon arise when the two forbid Leona and Clay from playing with them because they're girls. Theo and Cleo eventually come to the girls' aid by teaching everyone present about real-life pirate Anne Bonny, who leaps right out of a book to insist, rather forcefully, that everyone plays pirate. Book read: The Adventures of Mississippi Skip and his Pirate Ship by Ipswitch Clipspringer V Sponsors: Short I
12	12	"The Chap with Caps"	April 18, 2000
Famous author Babs Caplan visits the library to find inspiration for her new story. Babs' story, which deals with a cap salesman who finds that his merchandise has been swiped by a mischievous bunch of monkeys, turns out to have an abrupt end, so the cubs offer her some suggestions on how to improve it. Book read: The Chap with Caps by Babs Caplan Sponsors: Short A
13	13	"Pandora's Box"	April 19, 2000
While peering through a book of Ancient Greek myths, the lions read the tale of Pandora's Box. When it is discovered that the book is missing its last pages, Theo and Cleo try to convince their cubs that no good could come from opening the box. Nevertheless, the cubs continue their search for the last pages and, thanks to Click, learn the true ending of the story. Book read: Pandora's Box (Greek Myths) by Eda Twistturn Sponsors: Short O
14	14	"Lionel's Great Escape Trick"	April 20, 2000
Lionel has developed an obsession with Harry Houdini, and aspires to be a great escape artist like he was. To that end, he has Click drag him into a Houdini website so he can talk to the man in person. Meanwhile, Leona, thinking that her brother is stuck in a closet, tries to use magic words in the hopes of freeing him. Sponsors: Short I
15	15	"There's a Fly in My Soup"	April 21, 2000
The lions spend the day reading variations of the famous "fly in my soup" joke, which makes everyone laugh. The only one not cracking up is Click, who does not have a sense of humor, so the lions try to teach her about how to find things funny. It doesn't work at first, but in the end, Click finally learns to laugh by making "fly in my computer" jokes. Book read: The Universal Encyclopedia of Fly Jokes Sponsors: Y (Long I)
16	16	"The Popcorn Popper"	April 24, 2000
The cubs read a book about a girl who loves popcorn and is granted a magic popcorn popper by a designated reader. When the girl tires of the endless popcorn, she finds that the popper won't stop popping because she can't read the instructions. After the story, the cubs have Click drag the popper out of the book so it can make them popcorn, but they end up losing the instructions and are unable to make the popper stop popping, even when Click puts it back in the book. Book read: The Popcorn Popper by Pops Popadopoulis Sponsors: Short O
17	17	"Something Fishy"	April 25, 2000
Lionel reads a new "Cliff Hanger" book where Cliff disguises himself as a fish so he can be carried off the cliff by a passing eagle. Inspired by this, Leona dresses herself up as a fish and has Click drag her into the book so the eagle can make her fly as well. Book read: Cliff Hanger and the Fish and the Eagle by Livingston Dangerously Sponsors: Short I
18	18	"Hug, Hug, Hug!"	April 26, 2000
The lions read the story of "Pygmalion", where the ancient Greek sculptor creates a statue of a woman so beautiful that he falls in love with it. Seeing how miserable he is when he discovers that his creation can't return his affection, the lions have Click bring Pygmalion and his statue out of the book so they can teach him to love the statue in different ways. Book read: Pygmalion retold by Rudyard H. Lugnut, the First Sponsors: Short U
19	19	"The Ram in the Pepper Patch"	April 27, 2000
The cubs read a story about a ram named Sam who invades a young girl's pepper patch. The story ends when Sam runs away after he is stung by a bee, but in the process, he bursts right out of the book. Afraid to go back in the book out of fear of getting stung again, Sam is offered to stay in the library until his sting heals up. Problems promptly arise when Sam decides to work off his pain by running around, his strength and speed causing massive damage to the library. The lions finally convince him to return to the book after a library patron reads it and sees how boring it is without him. Book read: Ram in the Pepper Patch by Chile Ramirez Sponsors: Short A
20	20	"A Peck of Peppers"	April 28, 2000
Babs Caplan returns to the library in the hopes of writing an unbeatable tongue twister. While Leona wants to help her because it's a good thing to do, Lionel agrees to help her solely so he can beat her tongue twister, claiming that there isn't a tongue twister he can't say. Book read: Tricky Tongue Twisters by Peppy Pick Pepper Peckpacker Sponsors: Short E
21	21	"Sausage Nose"	May 1, 2000
The lions watch an old Swedish film where a poor couple are given three wishes by an old lady. When the wife wastes the first wish on a single sausage, her angered husband accidentally uses the second wish to have the sausage stuck to her nose. To this end, the couple manage to exit the film and enter the library, where they meet the lions and ask them to help decide how they should use their last wish. Sponsors: Short I
22	22	"Red Hat, Green Hat"	May 2, 2000
Lionel reads a story about two farmers and lifelong friends in Africa who notice a woman wearing a red and green hat. The farmers begin arguing about the color of the woman's hat whenever she passes by, since each of them can only see one side of the hat. Meanwhile, Leona has made a similar hat that she intends to show to everybody. When she does, everybody in the library gets into the same argument as the farmers, prompting Lionel to have Leona show them that the hat is more than one color. Book read: Red Hat, Green Hat retold by Ed Ledbetter Sponsors: Short E
23	23	"The Lucky Duck"	May 3, 2000
The lions read a book about an incredibly cute duck who plays in a puddle. The duck suddenly leaps out of the book, having grown sick and tired of being cute all the time. Since he can't stand the cuteness either, Lionel offers to teach the duck how not to be cute. In the end, Lionel writes a new book where the duck is made less cute by having him play in the mud. The duck agrees to enter this new book, but not before Click copies him so his old book will still have its own duck. Book read: The Lucky, Lucky, Lucky Duck by Ernestine Darling Sponsors: Short U
24	24	"The Old Man"	May 4, 2000
Babs Caplan once again returns to the library, this time aspiring to write a scary story about an old man. The story appears to repeat itself endlessly, once again prompting the lions to insist that it needs improvement. Book read: The Old Man, The Scary Old Man, and The Old Man from Another Planet by Babs Caplan Sponsors: Short A
25	25	"A King and His Hawk"	May 5, 2000
Lionel reads Leona a story about a king who killed his best friend, a hawk who tried to save his life from drinking poisonous water. Overcome with emotion by the incredibly sad ending, Leona tries to hide the book where no one will find it, and in the process, nearly makes the same mistake that the king made with Lionel. Book read: A King and His Hawk by Ingrid Ringling Singer Sponsors: Short I
26	26	"The Roar That Makes Them Run"	May 8, 2000
Lionel and Leona visit a website about African animals, where they learn that lions have a mighty roar that makes all the other animals run in fear. Inspired, they try to have Theo unleash such a roar, but he politely refuses to do so. Sponsors: Short U
27	27	"Piggyback, Piggyback"	May 9, 2000
Theo reads a story about a king who rides on his assistant's back everywhere he goes to prevent his feet from getting dirty. This inspires Leona to do the same with her dad, having him carry her on his back everywhere she goes. Book read: The Dirty Smelly King by Sir Hackney Mackinhack Sponsors: Short A
28	28	"The Fox and the Crow"	May 10, 2000
Cleo reads a fable where a fox tricks a crow into singing in the hopes that she becomes the queen of all birds, only for her to drop the piece of cheese she was holding, which lands in the fox's mouth. The pigeons, depressed after hearing the story's ending, protest the story's unfair treatment of birds in the hopes of getting it banned. To rectify the situation, Lionel and Leona rewrite the story so that the crow now holds an incredibly big piece of cheese in her beak, which hits the fox on the head when it's dropped. Book read: The Fox and the Crow by Aesop Sponsors: Short O
29	29	"Giants and Cubs"	May 11, 2000
Lionel finds a newspaper article detailing how the San Francisco Giants "clobbered" the Chicago Cubs in a baseball game yesterday, and is furious that the Cubs have lost. Meanwhile, Leona overhears her brother's anger, but mistakes the Giants for actual giants who wish to clobber actual cubs. To clear up the confusion, Click brings two of the Giants out of the newspaper, who explain that the names of the teams are not meant to be taken literally, and that no one team always wins or loses. Sponsors: Short U
30	30	"Be Bop"	May 12, 2000
In this musical episode, a pair of dancing overshoes appear in the library, producing bebop music wherever they go. The lions discover that the shoes come from a book about jazz legend Charlie Parker, which they read. After the story, the dancing shoes reemerge from the book, prompting the lions and everybody else in the library to get into the rhythm. The only one not enjoying the music is Barnaby B. Busterfield III, who doesn't understand bebop and its way of not making sense. Book read: Charlie Parker Played Be Bop by Chris Raschka Sponsors: Short O

=== Season 2 (2001) ===
No. overall	No. in season	Title	Original release date
31	1	"The Sad Dad"	April 2, 2001
Leona and Lionel previously had Click drag them into a book about ships. After discovering that the room they are in is too small, Click drags Theo into the book so he can settle the cubs' problem. He reads them a Russian folk tale that focuses on a father (Bruno Kirby) whose house is too small to contain his large family. He visits a "wise woman" (Denny Dillon) to seek advice for his dilemma, but her advice ends up making the house even more crowded. When Cleo and the other patrons of the library want to hear the story as well, Click drags them all into the book, recreating the folk tale's plot. Book read: It Could Be Worse (Russian Folk Tales) adapted by Vladimir Vladimirovich Vladivostok Sponsors: Short A
32	2	"Humph! Humph! Humph!"	April 3, 2001
During the library's Designated Reader Day, Lionel introduces everyone to his new friend, Gus the Rabbit. When Leona meets Gus, she asks him to be her designated reader, but Gus repeatedly declines the opportunity. As such, Lionel reads the story she wanted to hear, which focuses on a lazy camel who is given a hump by a djinn. After hearing the story, Leona still wants Gus to read it to her, but Gus ultimately reveals that he can't read to her because he doesn't know how to read. Hearing this, the lions assure Gus that some people take longer than others to learn how to read, and Lionel promises to teach him. Book read: How the Camel Got His Hump (Just So Stories) by Rudyard Kipling Song: You Gotta Jump sung by Lionel, Gus, and Monkey Singers in Busterfield Library Sponsors: Short U
33	3	"The Good Seed"	April 4, 2001
Theo believes that Lionel is ready to handle some additional responsibility and puts him in charge of the returns desk while he takes a nap. While Lionel is at the desk, he decides, against Click's warnings, to open a suspicious e-mail that comes in. The e-mail turns out to contain a virus that wreaks havoc on the library's computer system and causes Click to suffer a catastrophic malfunction. Meanwhile, Leona and Cleo are gardening on the rooftop. Cleo reads a Chinese fable about a boy who tries to plant a seed so that he may become the next Emperor, but the seed seems unable to grow. Book read: The Empty Pot by Demi Sponsors: Long E (Double E)
34	4	"Icarus' Wings"	April 5, 2001
Cleo read "Icarus' Wings”, where the careless Icarus and his intelligent father Daedalus escape from the clutches of an evil king by building wings of feathers and wax, but Icarus flies too close to the sun and the heat melts the wax. This inspires Walter and Clay to make Busterfield wings, who has grown bored sitting in the library's dome for years. He is soon spotted by the cubs, who are eagerly seeking UFOs. Book read: Icarus's Wings retold by Bing Dingling Sponsors: Short I
35	5	"Zoop! Zoop!"	April 6, 2001
After hearing Lionel read Pete Seeger’s Abiyoyo, Leona becomes scared of the giant in the book. Theo makes a mask that looks like Abiyoyo to teach Leona not to be afraid, but it scares her even more. After Cleo and Leona tell their own version of the Abiyoyo story, Leona finally overcomes her fears and puts the mask on, scaring everyone, including Lionel and Theo. Book read: Abiyoyo by Pete Seeger Sponsors: Long O (Double O)
36	6	"Clickety-Clack, Clickety-Clack!"	April 9, 2001
Cleo reads a story about Farmer Brown, who learns that his cows, who have come into possession of a typewriter, can type. The cows use the typewriter to inform him that they refuse to give him milk unless they receive electric blankets for the cold nights. Inspired by the story, Theo, who has a passion for typewriters, digs his own typewriter out of the basement, but discovers that it is too old and dusty to work properly. As such, he has Click drag the cows’ typewriter out of the book so he can use it. Unable to finish the story, Cleo and the cubs work to fix Theo's original typewriter so the cows can have theirs back. Book read: Click, Clack, Moo by Doreen Cronin Sponsors: Short I
37	7	"Poetry Day"	April 10, 2001
The lions host the library's annual Poetry Day, in which different characters recite different poems. Also making an appearance is Robert Louis Stevenson, who emerges from a book to recite "Rain", one of the poems from his book, A Child's Garden of Verses. Poem read: Waiting for the Train by Theo Lion, Rain by Robert Louis Stevenson, Drain Chain by Lionel and Leona Lion, and A Poem by Walter and Clay Pigeon Sponsors: Long A (A I)
38	8	"Bobby the Hopping Robot"	April 11, 2001
Lionel’s new Bobby the Hopping Robot toy does not seem to live up to its name. He and Theo disassemble and reassemble the robot over and over to make him hop, but they just can't. In the end, Leona and Click telephone to the company that made Bobby, where they discover that the instructions have been misprinted and Bobby finally hops when the instructions are followed correctly. Sponsors: Short O
39	9	"Teacher's Pet"	April 12, 2001
Cleo plans on taking the cubs to her pride reunion, but she is suddenly unable to tell if someone is sneaking up behind her, making her discover that she is coming down with the flu. This prompts Theo and the cubs to do everything they can to nurse her back to health in time for the reunion. Sponsors: Long E (E A)
40	10	"The Last Cliff Hanger"	April 13, 2001
Lionel is excited that a new Cliff Hanger book is coming out. However, the new book also turns out to be the last. In it, Cliff finally gets off the cliff by jumping onto a passing whale, which blasts him onto a beach. When Lionel has Click drop him and Leona onto the beach to talk to Cliff, Cliff confesses that he can't stand the easy life, missing the danger and excitement. Cliff also tells the cubs that he can't just go back to the cliff, since his author, Livingston Dangerously, purposefully wrote him onto the beach. Eventually, the lions meet Livingston Dangerously via video chat and they help him rewrite the ending so that Cliff is washed off the beach and onto the whale who blasts him off its blowhole and back onto his usual spot on the cliff. Book read: The Last Cliff Hanger by Livingston Dangerously Sponsors: Short A
41	11	"Pebble Trouble"	April 16, 2001
A melancholy Leona hides under a table in the library's cafeteria because something is troubling her (which isn't revealed in the episode). In an attempt to get her to come out, Cleo reads her a story about a young donkey who finds a wish-granting pebble, but isn't very careful with what he wishes for. Book read: Sylvester and the Magic Pebble by William Steig Sponsors: Short E
42	12	"Oh, Yes, It Can!"	April 17, 2001
Storyteller Karen Kandel visits the library and recites an Ashanti folk story about a group of villagers who suddenly hear their personal belongings talking to them. After hearing the story, the lions start to hallucinate that their own belongings are talking to them. Sponsors: Short A
43	13	"Five, Six, and Thistle Sticks"	April 18, 2001
Lionel's best friend Lenny the Lizard comes to visit, but Lionel learns that Lenny has moved on from "Cliff Hanger" and now enjoys a new book series called "Justin Time". This makes Lionel think that the two of them can't be friends anymore, prompting Cleo to read them a story which teaches that people can always be friends, even if they don't always like the same things. Books read: Cliff Hanger and Trixie the Tricky Pixie by Livingston Dangerously, Justin Time and the 600 Pound Chicken by Lulu Zbacken-Towne, and When I Was Five by Arthur Howard Sponsors: Short I
44	14	"Bug Beard"	April 19, 2001
When his family snacks on some meat in front of one of his friends, Lionel begins to find them embarrassing. In response, Cleo reads a Dominican folk story about a small, dirty, fun-loving, dancing man who lives in a dense forest. The man is discovered by Mr. Cutter (Ossie Davis), a woodsman who finds the man's carefree nature entertaining and invites him to his house for dinner. Mrs. Cutter (Ruby Dee) frowns upon the man's slovenly appearance and lack of manners. With nowhere else to turn, the Cutters briefly emerge from the book to ask the lions for help. After the lions collect some books about manners and hygiene, the Cutters clean the man up, dress him in a suit, and teach him proper etiquette. Not only does this make the man miserable, but the forest starts dying without him present, as he was its protector. Seeing their mistake, the Cutters allow the man to return to his forest home, which springs back to life. Inspired by the story, Lionel agrees not to let his family embarrass him by being themselves. Book read: The Story of Bug Beard (Folk Tales) retold by Tug Smugly Sponsors: Short U
45	15	"Trains and Brains and Rainy Plains"	April 20, 2001
Theo reads a story about Ki-pat, an African farmer who observes an intense drought plaguing his land and starving his cattle. He manages to fix the problem by fashioning an arrow from an eagle feather and shooting it into the clouds, causing it to rain. Hatching an idea, the cubs have Click drag them and a train into the book. While riding the train, the sparks that the train produces cause the plains to catch fire. When news of the illustrated fire spreads, Theo has to stop a band of firefighters from using water because it will ruin the book. Fortunately, Walter allows for one of his feathers to be dragged into the book, where Ki-pat uses it to fashion a second arrow and pierce the clouds to produce more rain, which extinguishes the fire. Book read: Bringing the Rain to Kapiti Plain by Verna Aardema Sponsors: Long A (A I)
46	16	"Quest, Quest, Quest!"	April 23, 2001
Once again, Babs Caplan visits the library to write a story. Her latest work is a medieval fantasy tale where Lady Esther (Faith Prince) and her companion Lester the Jester (David Garrison) attempt to retrieve the Precious Chest of Budapest from the evil Count Chester the Congested (Michael McGrath). As expected, the story's ending is rather problematic, so the cubs once again assist Babs in improving it. Book read: The Quest for the Chest by Babs Caplan Sponsors: Short E
47	17	"The Spider and the Lie"	April 24, 2001
Trying his hand at being an author, Lionel writes a story in the crime genre. Told in classic film noir fashion, Lionel's story details Leona dealing with Monkey C. Monkeydew, a suspicious library patron who wishes to check out a book, but does not own a library card. Monkeydew tells Leona that if she allows him to check out his book without a library card, he promises that he will return it first thing tomorrow morning, even pointing out a spider on a nearby shelf that can act as his witness. The next day, Leona spots Monkeydew and asks him to return his book, but Monkeydew lies that the events of the day before never happened. Not convinced, Leona soon takes Monkeydew to court, hoping to prove that he broke his promise. Book read: The Spider and the Lie by Lionel Lion Sponsors: Long I
48	18	"Why the Baboon's Balloon Went Ka-boom!"	April 25, 2001
When Theo catches the cubs playing soccer indoors, he warns them that small things can leave big impacts. To prove his point, he reads a story about a disastrous chain of events that started when a small bug sneezes. Since Theo had pulled said book out from the middle of a tall stack, the sudden movement caused the pen he placed on top of the stack to fall to the floor. This ends up causing a similar chain reaction that trashes the library. Book read: Because a Little Bug Went Ka-Choo by Rosetta Stone (Dr. Seuss) Sponsors: Long O (Double O)
49	19	"But, Mama, But..."	April 26, 2001
Cleo is going away for a long while to see Aunt Priscilla and her three newborn lion cubs. This causes Leona to worry, as her mother has never had to leave home for such a long period before. To calm her down, Cleo reads a story about a boy who talks to his own mother about her adventures in coming home. Book read: I Miss You, Stinky Face by Lisa McCourt Sponsors: Short U
50	20	"Dreaming Shakespeare"	April 27, 2001
Everyone in the library celebrates Shakespeare Day, a tribute to the many works of Shakespeare. The Information Hen is the only one not celebrating, since she is completely unaware of who Shakespeare was. This proves problematic for her, as she is chosen to star in a re-enactment of "Romeo and Juliet". Book read: Romeo and Juliet by William Shakespeare Sponsors: Long E (E A)
51	21	"Rats"	April 30, 2001
Leona returns from a trip to the playground in tears, after her friend Tammy called her a nasty name. This prompts one of the library's patrons, a rat scholar named Frank, to read an Irish folk tale about how rats had been ridiculed into leaving Ireland in the distant past. Eventually, Leona learns that even though words can be powerful, they shouldn't be able to stop anyone. Books read: How the Rats were Rhymed out of Ireland and How the Rats Came Back by Shannon Shamley Sponsors: Short A
52	22	"Tweet! Tweet!"	May 1, 2001
Theo and Cleo read a book about dinosaurs and discover that they are the ancestors of birds. Inspired by this, Walter and Clay have Click drop them into another book about dinosaurs so they can meet their relatives. The only things they find in the book, however, are a hungry Tyrannosaurus rex and an asteroid. Special guest appearances by Big Bird, Bert and Ernie of Sesame Street. Books read: Bone Poems by Jeff Moss; Meet the Dinosaurs by Doreen van Beetsleet Sponsors: Long E (Double E)
53	23	"Good Night, Knight"	May 2, 2001
A group of puppeteers visit the library to put on a show involving knights doing battle in the Middle Ages. When Leona accidentally breaks one of the puppets, she's asked to perform in its place, which proves to be problematic when she develops stage fright. Sponsors: Long I
54	24	"The Chess Mess"	May 3, 2001
The lions celebrate "Alice Day" by dressing up as the characters from Alice in Wonderland. After reading "Through the Looking Glass", Theo has Click drag the giant chessboard out of the book so he can play a few games against her. Book read: Through the Looking-Glass by Lewis Carroll Sponsors: Short E
55	25	"Stop That Chicken!"	May 4, 2001
An argument between Lionel and Leona has them engaging in a tug of war over a "Fun with Chicken Jane" book. In the process, Chicken Jane is thrown out of the book and ricochets around the library. She lands in a book about Colonial America, where she provides her usual brand of advice to Paul Revere. As the lions search for her, Chicken Jane is then thrown from the book and lands in a copy of "Sleeping Beauty", where she also provides her advice to Prince Charming. When she is again thrown from the book, things quickly turn serious when Click detects that Chicken Jane has landed inside Molly Stewpot's "Cook a Lot Like Me" cookbook. To this end, the lions and the rest of the library patrons work together to rescue Chicken Jane and bring her back to her own book before it's too late. Book read: Chicken Jane and the Pond Sponsors: Short O

=== Season 3 (2002) ===
No. overall	No. in season	Title	Original release date
56	1	"Hay Day"	September 16, 2002
A girl gives a deal to a troll to let him turn straw into gold thread. Book read: Rumpelstiltskin by Raymond Jay Haywire Sponsors: Long A (A Y)
57	2	"Pigs Aplenty"	September 23, 2002
Cleo and Theo are going out, and Marmy Smartypants is Lionel and Leona's babysitter. When they decide to have a "Pig Party", Click thinks that a disaster is imminent. Book read: Pigs Aplenty, Pigs Galore! by David M. McPhail Sponsors: Short I
58	3	"What Parakeets Need"	September 30, 2002
Lionel and Leona are given the responsibility of taking care of a parakeet, and Leona tries to get it to say its name, "My name is Sweety Tweety.". Books read: What Parakeets Need by Dr. Freeman Van Fleet; The Carrot Seed by Ruth Krauss Sponsors: Long E (Double E)
59	4	"Too Cool"	October 7, 2002
One of Lionel's classmates, Derek Cheetah, comes to the library, but Lionel thinks Derek's too cool for his baseball team. Book read: Earl's Too Cool for Me by Leah Komaiko Sponsors: Long O (Double O)
60	5	"You Can't Catch Me!"	October 14, 2002
It's Leona's birthday, and her family reads her the story of "The Gingerbread Man." However, she becomes very sad at the end of the story when he gets eaten by the fox. Book read: The Gingerbread Man by Pat Hatchman Sponsors: Short A
61	6	"Huff and Puff"	October 21, 2002
After hearing the story of "The Three Little Pigs," Leona writes a sequel in which the Big Bad Wolf gets better after getting his tail burned while Lionel's depicts him being brought back to life by a mad scientist and renamed "the Wolf-inator" who blows the brick house down and is chased away by the pigs as robots. Book read: The Three Little Pigs by Muffy Huffington Sponsors: Short U
62	7	"Out in Outer Space"	October 28, 2002
Lionel and Leona's maternal grandfather comes to the library and tells a story about Ellen Ochoa, a friend who is the first Hispanic woman in space. Lionel and Leona make their biography about him. Sponsors: O U and O W
63	8	"Help!"	November 4, 2002
Lionel and Leona lost their favorite book, so they decide to help the Information Hen in hopes of finding it. Books read: The Little Red Hen by Mel Helper; Henry, the Very Helpful Red Herring by Helen Yelper Sponsors: Short E
64	9	"Two Coats, One Goat and One Boat"	November 11, 2002
A man makes things out of an old overcoat. Books read: Cliff Hanger and the Enchanted Goat in a Coat in a Boat by Livingston Dangerously; Joseph Had a Little Overcoat by Simms Taback Sponsors: Long O (O A)
65	10	"Treats!"	November 18, 2002
The creators of the Lions' favorite "Wheaty Meat Treats" ad are hired to make a commercial for the library. But they can't seem to get it right. Sponsors: Long E (E A)

=== Season 4 (2003) ===
No. overall	No. in season	Title	Original release date
66	1	"Art Party"	September 15, 2003
While cleaning out the closet, the Lions come across the painting of 'The Sleeping Gypsy' by Henri Rousseau. Cleo tells the cubs that people can get different feelings from the same art, thrusting both Leona and Lionel to make their own stories about the gypsy. Sponsors: A R
67	2	"Grow, Mane, Grow!"	September 16, 2003
Lionel tries to use a device to make his mane grow longer. He also makes up a song called "Grow, Mane, Grow". Sponsors: Long A
68	3	"Three Goats, No Waiting"	September 17, 2003
Lionel directs the "Three Billy Goats Gruff" play, but he has trouble finding someone who's scary enough to play the part of the Troll. Book read: Three Billy Goats Gruff by Noam Oakley Sponsors: Long O (O A)
69	4	"Step by Step"	September 18, 2003
Lionel, Leona, and Cleo discover a treasure map that belonged to Busterfield when he was a boy. Sponsors: Short E
70	5	"Dance in Smarty Pants!"	September 19, 2003
Lionel and Leona want to meet Arty Smartypants, but Cleo reads to them a book he wrote. Book read: No Dancing by Arty Smartypants Sponsors: Short A

=== Season 5 (2005) ===
No. overall	No. in season	Title	Original release date
71	1	"Pigs, Pigs, Pigs! & The Three Little Pigs"	April 18, 2005
Sponsors: P, H
72	2	"The Carrot Seed & The Empty Pot"	April 25, 2005
A boy tries to prove he can grow a large carrot, but he does not succeed. Sponsors: S, P
73	3	"Wings & What's In the Box?"	May 2, 2005
(1.) A boy disobeys his father's warnings, (2.) then Leona has fun with an empty box. Sponsors: W, B
74	4	"A Shower of Stars & Two Moons and One Lagoon"	May 9, 2005
(1.) A lion cub sees stars for the first time. (2.) Then, Lionel and Leona make up a story about touching the moon. Sponsors: S T, N
75	5	"The Golden Meaty Awards"	May 16, 2005
Lionel gives out awards for his favorite songs in the show.
76	6	"Click, Clack, Moo & The Little Red Hen"	May 23, 2005
(1.) A farmer's cows go on strike while typing, (2.) And then a hen tries to do things by herself without any help. Sponsors: Hard C, H
77	7	"Sylvester and the Magic Pebble & I Miss You, Stinky Face"	May 30, 2005
(1.) A donkey makes a bad wish using a magic pebble. (2.) Then a boy imagines all the adventure his mother will have when coming home. Sponsors: P, M
78	8	"A Tasty Piece of Cheese; The Lion and the Mouse"	June 6, 2005
Sponsors: C H, L
79	9	"Earl's Too Cool; When I Was Five"	June 13, 2005
Sponsors: T, F
80	10	"It's Red! It's Green!; Joseph Had a Little Overcoat"	June 20, 2005
(1.) Two men argue over a hat. (2.) Then a man makes things out of his old overcoat until there's nothing left. Sponsors: R, J

=== Season 6 (2006) ===
No. overall	No. in season	Title	Original release date
81	1	"Mrs. McNosh Hangs Up Her Wash; Knuffle Bunny"	April 17, 2006
A lady hangs up a lot of weird things on her wire. Then, a baby misplaces her favorite toy. Book read: Mrs. McNosh Hangs Up Her Wash by Sarah Weeks; Knuffle Bunny by Mo Willems Sponsors: E R, Y (Long E)
82	2	"Sheep on a Ship; Mississippi Skip and his Pirate Ship"	April 24, 2006
Book read: Sheep on a Ship by Nancy E. Shaw Sponsors: S H, S K
83	3	"Yo! Yes?; Very Loud, Very Big, Very Metal"	May 1, 2006
A boy tries to get a friend to play with him. Then, Lionel watches a music video about vehicles. Book read: Yo! Yes? by Chris Raschka Sponsors: Y, V
84	4	"I'll Fix Anthony; Jamaica Louise James"	May 8, 2006
Book read: I'll Fix Anthony by Judith Viorst; Jamaica Louise James by Amy Hest Sponsors: X, A W
85	5	"Pete's a Pizza; Pygmalion"	May 15, 2006
A boy is sad that he can't go out to play as it is raining, so his father decides to cheer him up by turning him into a pizza. Then, the lions read a Greek myth about a sculptor who learns that love makes statues come to life. Book read: Pete's a Pizza by William Steig Sponsors: T H, Hard G
86	6	"Here Come the Aliens; Abiyoyo"	May 22, 2006
Lionel and his friends believe that there are aliens in the library, but Lionel becomes disappointed when he realizes there are not. Later, a boy and his father work together to defeat an evil giant. Book read: Here Comes the Aliens by Colin McNaughton Sponsors: Q U, Z
87	7	"King Midas; The Dirty Smelly King"	May 29, 2006
A greedy king wishes that everything he touches turns to gold. He gets the wish, but soon wishes he hadn't. Later, a king rides on his assistant's back to prevent his feet from getting dirty. Book read: King Midas Sponsors: K, C K
88	8	"Cheesybreadville; Stolen Smells"	June 5, 2006
Book read: Cheesybreadville by Sonia Manzano; Stolen Smells by Chimoyoy Royroy Sponsors: O R, O Y
89	9	"The Coyote and the Rabbit; The Gingerbread Man"	June 12, 2006
A rabbit in a desert challenges a coyote to a race around the world. Later, a gingerbread man gets chased by people and animals who want to eat him. Book read: The Coyote and the Rabbit Sponsors: Soft C, Soft G
90	10	"The Goat in the Coat"	June 19, 2006
Book read: Cliff Hanger and the Enchanted Goat in a Coat by Livingston Dangerously Sponsors: Long O (O A)

=== Season 7 (2007) ===
No. overall	No. in season	Title	Original release date
91	1	"The Problem With Chickens; An Egg Is Quiet"	September 17, 2007
Book read: The Problem with Chicken by Bruce McMillan; An Egg Is Quiet by Dianna Aston Sponsors: C H
92	2	"Spicy Hot Colors; Yesterday I Had the Blues"	September 24, 2007
Cleo reads a story about colors and what Mexican things are that color. Then, a boy tells how colors can describe his family and friends' feelings. Book read: Spicy Hot Colors by Sherry Shahan; Yesterday I Had the Blues by Jeron Ashford Sponsors: Hard C
93	3	"Bear Snores On; Night in the Country"	October 1, 2007
Some animals have a party and interrupt a bear's sleep. Then, Click reads a story about what happens in the countryside at nighttime. Book read: Bear Snores On by Karma Wilson; Night in the Country by Cynthia Rylant Sponsors: N
94	4	"How to Be a Good Dog; Not Afraid of Dogs"	October 8, 2007
A cat tries to get a dog to behave. Then, a boy who thinks he's fearless tries to get over his fear of dogs. Book read: How to Be a Good Dog by Gail Page; Not Afraid of Dogs by Susanna Pitzer Sponsors: Double O
95	5	"Dear Mr. Blueberry; I Wanna Iguana"	October 15, 2007
A girl writes letters to her teacher about whales. Then a boy tries to convince his mother to get him a pet iguana. Book read: Dear Mr. Blueberry by Simon James; I Wanna Iguana by Karen Kaufman Orloff Sponsors: W H
96	6	"Violet's Music; What Instrument Does Alvin Play?"	October 22, 2007
Book read: Violet's Music by Angela Johnson; What Instrument Does Alvin Play? by Grace Notes Sponsors: M
97	7	"Moon Rope; Welcome to the Moon"	October 29, 2007
Book read: Moon Rope (Un lazo a la luna) by Lois Ehlert Sponsors: Long O
98	8	"The Three-Legged Pot; When Jabo Jammed"	November 5, 2007
A boy tries to get a heavy pot up a hill, and when Leona gets it out of the book, she tries to make it dance. Then, Fred Newman tells a story about a boy who loves to make music. Book read: The Three-Legged Pot Sponsors: P, J
99	9	"Charlie's Dinosaur; Here Come the Aliens"	November 12, 2007
Here Come the Aliens is a repeat of an episode in Season 6. Book read: Charlie's Dinosaur Sponsors: Q U
100	10	"Making Bread; Cheesybreadville"	November 19, 2007
The lions watch a video about a man who goes to a bakery to learn how to make bread. Later, a disaster in the kitchen creates a brand new treat. Cheesybreadville is a repeat of an episode in Season 6. Sponsors: O R

=== Season 8 (2008) ===
No. overall	No. in season	Title	Original release date
101	1	"Ruby Sings the Blues; The Camel Dances"	September 15, 2008
A loud girl learns how to sing. Then, a camel decides to perform ballet in front of other animals.
102	2	"Mole and the Baby Bird; Owen and Mzee"	September 22, 2008
A mole learns that some animals shouldn't be pets. Later, Lionel reads a story about a hippopotamus and a turtle who become friends.
103	3	"Stop That Pickle; Chicks and Salsa"	September 29, 2008
A pickle goes on the loose, so some foods come to life to chase after the pickle, but they're too slow to catch it. Later, some farm animals decide to make some Southwestern food after they grow tired of the same food given to them.
104	4	"Are You a Snail?; Wonderful Worms"	October 6, 2008
The Information Hen reads a story about what people would do if they were snails. Later, Lionel and Leona help a monkey find her missing pet worm.
105	5	"Stone Soup; Bee-Bim Bop!"	October 13, 2008
Cliff Hanger reads a book about a village that helps a couple of aliens make a special soup. Then, a girl helps her mother make dinner.
106	6	"Bein' with You This Way; How to Be"	October 20, 2008
Lionel, Leona, and their friends watch a music video about being different. Later, Lionel and Leona read a story about pretending to be different animals.
107	7	"No One Told the Aardvark; Sea Horse"	October 27, 2008
108	8	"Elephants Can Paint, Too!; Jamaica Louise James"	November 3, 2008
Jamaica Louise James is a repeat of an episode in Season 6.
109	9	"Trosclair and the Alligator; The Coyote and the Rabbit"	November 10, 2008
The Coyote and the Rabbit is a repeat of an episode in Season 6.
110	10	"I Don't Want a Birthday Party; Knuffle Bunny"	November 17, 2008
Knuffle Bunny is a repeat of an episode in Season 6.

=== Season 9 (2009) ===
No. overall	No. in season	Title	Original release date
111	1	"Night Shift; Under Construction"	September 21, 2009
112	2	"Bugs; Beetle Bop"	September 28, 2009
113	3	"Cliff Hanger, the Pheasant, and the Phone; Terrific"	October 5, 2009
114	4	"River Story; Salmon in Alaska"	October 12, 2009
115	5	"Pigs in Hiding; Stop That Pickle!"	October 19, 2009
Stop That Pickle! is a repeat of an episode in Season 8.
116	6	"Priceless Gifts; King Midas"	October 26, 2009
King Midas is a repeat of an episode in Season 6.
117	7	"The Popcorn Popper; Oh, Yes, It Can!"	November 2, 2009
The cubs read a book about a girl who loves popcorn, but when she is granted a magic popcorn popper, it won't stop popping because she can't read the instructions. The cubs have Click drag the popper out of the book so it can make them popcorn, but they end up losing the instructions and are unable to make the popper stop popping, even when Click puts it back in the book. Then, storyteller Karen Kandel visits the library and recites an Ashanti folk story about a group of villagers who suddenly hear their belongings talking to them. The Popcorn Popper is a repeat of an episode in Season 1 and Oh, Yes, It Can! is a repeat of an episode in Season 2.
118	8	"The Emperor's New Clothes; The Hungry Coat"	November 9, 2009
Sponsors: Long U, V
119	9	"Like a Windy Day; Winter Is the Warmest Season"	November 16, 2009
Note: This episode has animated segments by CloudKid featuring the Lions, replacing the usual puppet segments.
120	10	"Angelina's Island; Chinese New Year"	November 23, 2009

=== Season 10 (2010) ===
No. overall	No. in season	Title	Original release date
121	1	"Three More Little Pigs; The Ants and the Grasshopper"	September 20, 2010
Lionel, Leona, and the Wolf each try their hand at writing a sequel to The Three Little Pigs, and Leona finds a way to work and play. Note: This episode has animated segments by CloudKid featuring the Lions, replacing the usual puppet segments.
122	2	"A Birthday for Cow!; Rabbit's Gift"	September 27, 2010
The humble turnip stars in this show about birthday celebrations, vegetables, and the gift of giving.
123	3	"City Mouse and Country Mouse; The Happy Hocky Family Moves to the Country!"	October 4, 2010
Click the Mouse trades places with a real mouse, and the country comes to the library.
124	4	"Pablo the Artist; Dream Carver"	October 11, 2010
The Lion family is inspired to create works of art, and Gus is inspired when he and Lionel work on a page from the Cliff Hanger Coloring Book.
125	5	"Roller Coaster; What Do Wheels Do All Day?"	October 18, 2010
Leona is finally ready-or is she?-to take the training wheels off her bike, and Squeaky the Wheel has the audience rolling with laughter in the library.
126	6	"Not Norman; Me and My Cat?"	October 25, 2010
Theo feels as unappreciated as a goldfish named Norman, and a malfunctioning computer gets the Lion family all mixed up.
127	7	"My Dog Is as Smelly as Dirty Socks; Just What Mama Needs"	November 1, 2010
The Lion family turns a box of junk into self-portraits, and Leona tricks Lionel into cleaning her room.
128	8	"Castles, Caves, and Honeycombs; My House"	November 8, 2010
Leona helps a snail find a new home in the library's new All Different Kinds of Homes wing, and Lionel moves into a new home too.
129	9	"Deep in the Swamp; Trosclair and the Alligator"	November 15, 2010
Lionel tries to frighten Leona with creepy, crawly swamp things, and a clever boy tricks a hungry alligator. Trosclair and the Alligator is a repeat of an episode in Season 8.
130	10	"Red Parka Mary; Not Afraid of Dogs"	November 22, 2010
Leona and her friend Sadie are scarier than they think, and a boy learns that dogs are not so scary after all. Not Afraid of Dogs is a repeat of an episode in Season 7.
