= Something from Nothing =

Something from Nothing may refer to:

== Science and philosophy ==
- Ex nihilo, a Latin phrase meaning "out of nothing", which often appears in conjunction with the concept of creation

== Music ==
- Something from Nothing, a 1971 bootleg recording by Pink Floyd
- "Something from Nothing" (song), a 2014 single by Foo Fighters
- "Something from Nothing", a 2010 song by Danish singer-songwriter Aura Dione

== Film ==
- Something from Nothing: The Art of Rap, a 2012 documentary about rap music

== Books ==
- Something from Nothing, a 1992 children's book by Phoebe Gilman
- Joseph Had a Little Overcoat, a 1999 children's book by Simms Taback which features the phrase

== See also ==
- Nothing from Nothing (disambiguation)
- Something for Nothing (disambiguation)
