= Between the Lions =

American children's television program

- Genre: Education; Children's television series
- Created by: Lou Berger; Christopher Cerf; Michael K. Frith; Kathryn Mullen; Norman Stiles
- Starring: Fred Newman; Ruth Westheimer; Puppeteers: Peter Linz; Anthony Asbury; Heather Asch; Jennifer Barnhart; Tyler Bunch; Jim Kroupa; Pam Arciero; Tim Lagasse; Kathryn Mullen; Noel MacNeal
- Theme music composer: Sarah Durkee; Paul Jacobs
- Opening theme: "Between the Lions" (sung by Cindy Mizelle)
- Ending theme: "Between the Lions"
- Composer: Chris Cerf
- Country of origin: United States
- Original language: English
- No. of seasons: 10
- No. of episodes: 130 (list of episodes)

Production
- Production location: New York City, New York
- Running time: 26 minutes
- Production companies: WGBH-TV (2000–07); WGBH Kids (2008–10); Sirius Thinking, Ltd.; Mississippi Public Broadcasting (2005–10)

Original release
- Network: PBS Kids
- Release: April 3, 2000 – November 22, 2010

Between the Lions is an American educational children's television series designed to promote reading that combines live-action, sketch comedy, animation, and puppetry. The show is a co-production between WGBH in Boston, Sirius Thinking, Ltd., in New York City, and Mississippi Public Broadcasting (the latter PBS station co-producing from 2005 to 2010) in Jackson, the distributor from seasons 1–10. The show won ten Daytime Emmy awards between 2001 and 2007. The show premiered on PBS Kids on April 3, 2000, taking over the schedule slot held by The Puzzle Place upon its debut, and ended on November 22, 2010. While not produced with Sesame Workshop's involvement, it is created by alumni of the fellow PBS children's show Sesame Street, which was produced by Sesame Workshop, and featured guest appearances from some of its characters. Furthermore, it is a companion piece to Sesame Street aimed at slightly older children.

== Premise ==
The series focuses on a family of anthropomorphic lions working and living in the Barnaby B. Busterfield III Memorial Public Library, starring alongside characters such as Click, an electronic, anthropomorphic computer mouse; the Information Hen, who answers library calls; and Heath, a dinosaur who serves as the library's thesaurus. The program's format is intended to promote literacy and reading; in each episode, the lions introduce a picture book to the audience and read it. Some episodes have featured adaptations of well-known folktales, ancient myths, or fables, while others have featured popular storybooks, or shown the lions learning or benefiting from the lessons presented by the story.

The series often features an array of educational segments, including parodies of notable media redesigned educationally for younger audiences or simple animations. A sub-plot features a pair of pigeons named Walter and Clay, comically infuriating a living bust of the library's deceased founder, Barnaby B. Busterfield III, located in the dome of the library, which is normally intended for comic relief and bizarre wordplay.

After the fourth season, the series underwent a noticeable format change. Notably, the show consisted of two 10-minute shorts, each a condensation of an earlier episode, tied together and united around a theme. The library set was greatly reduced, with just one small section as the primary location. Past segments such as "Magic Time," "Sam Spud", and "The Monkey Pop-Up Theater" were replaced with new animated ones such as "Joy Learno" and "The Trampolini Brothers". Later episodes shifted away from the earlier focus on reading, and stories were just told to tie into the theme of the episode. Major characters such as Busterfield, Walter and Clay, Heath, and Martha Reader vanished from the show as well, despite still appearing in the intro.

== Characters ==
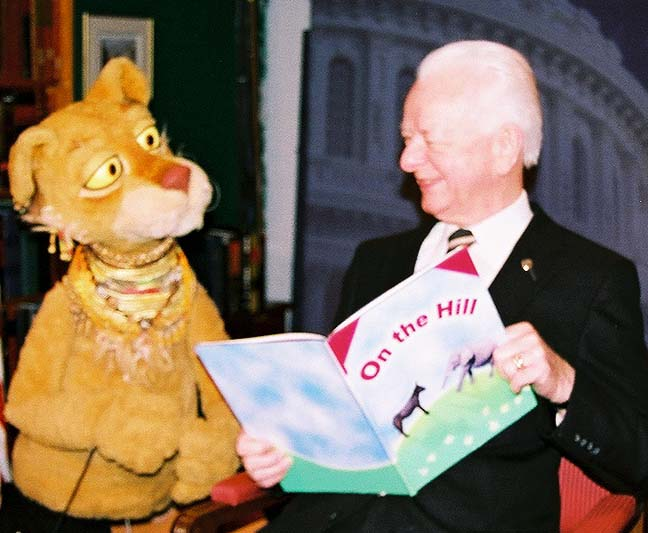
Senator Robert Byrd with Cleo on Between the Lions

=== Main ===
- Theo Lion is the co-owner/librarian of the library (with his wife Cleo), Lionel and Leona's father, and Cleo's husband with a scruffy attitude, loud gravelly voice, and a large appetite. He loves to eat meat and devours it all in one second. He loves to joke but also has a powerful roar and is proclaimed "the King of the Library". Theo has an unending love for storytelling and is always proud to show library patrons the best books available. He also has a blues-singing and guitar-playing alter ego, B.B. the King of Beasts.
- Cleo Lion is the library's other co-owner/librarian (with her husband Theo), the mother of the cubs, Theo's wife, and the family hunter. She loves to read to her cubs and use the stories to teach them important life lessons. She has the alter-ego of a country lion singer, Tammy Lionette. Cleo's hunting instincts also make her a good investigative reporter, and she can track down any book in the building, regardless of genre. She also has a powerful roar.
- Lionel Lion is Theo and Cleo's 7-year-old first-grader son. He loves to read "Cliff Hanger" books and always looks forward to the next one, much to Leona's annoyance. Lionel can get flustered when his family embarrasses him when they are devouring their food or if he is reading a toddler's book to Leona, but he loves them just the same. Since Lionel is always so self-confident, he is often convinced he doesn't need any advice or help with his problems, but he always ends up needing it after all.
- Leona Lion is Theo and Cleo's 4-year-old daughter. Leona is curious about everything and is preparing to read as well as her brother, Lionel. Unlike Lionel, she is more in touch with her feral instincts and always practices her pouncing and hunting on her brother or her father. While Lionel loves Cliff Hanger books, Leona hates them because of how predictable and repetitive they are.
- Click the Mouse is a female computer mouse shaped like the rodent of the same name. Click is technically skilled in that she can drag and drop objects and characters into and out of books and websites. When a character needs her, they only need to call out her name (usually screaming if it's an emergency) since she doesn't mind helping others and will do what they tell her to do. Her only hindrances are being a computer mouse, she must always stay connected to a computer, and she is vulnerable to computer viruses, as shown in one episode. Click vanished for a while after the fourth season, but returned after the last few seasons.
- Barnaby B. Busterfield III is a grouchy rock bust statue who is the founder of the library, which is named after him, and lives on the dome of the library. He is often left annoyed by the antics of Walter and Clay Pigeon. Being a bust, he cannot go anywhere, so the pigeons and the viewers are the only ones to whom he can address his complaints. He is annoyed when anyone calls him "Buster" and when the announcer pesters him. He has the ability to open the top of his head. Busterfield is absent after Season 4.
- Walter and Clay Pigeon are the two pigeons that live in the library's dome with Busterfield. They conversely talk to and annoy him. Walter is the male pigeon, and Clay is the female pigeon. Walter and Clay Pigeon are true urban birds. They manage to say complete sentences only with each other's help and someone else's help. (For example, the Pigeons say, "We are going roller...uh...skating."). Walter and Clay are absent after Season 4.

=== Recurring ===
- Heath the Thesaurus is the library's thesaurus, who is a giant dinosaur (a sauropod dinosaur; Brontosaurus) as a pun on the word "thesaurus" or "the saurus". He lives in the basement and often shows up unexpectedly when a character asks about a homophonic word or when a situation calls for one. He was voiced by Tyler Bunch (in a deep baritone voice) in Season 1 and Peter Linz (doing a loose WC Fields impression) from Season 2 onwards. Heath does not appear after the fourth season.
- The Information Hen is the library's information specialist. Each time she appears, she gives information about the library and reads to several callers, usually by telling a joke or singing a song. She appears in animated segments in Season 5.
- Dr. Alexander Graham Nitwhite is a pelican scientist. His name is often mispronounced as "Dr. Nitwit" by his duck assistant, Watson, and sometimes by other characters: a routine has Theo and Cleo saying hello to "Dr. Nitwit" and when they are corrected they proclaim "Right...". In several skits, he announces to Watson that he's discovered "the only word in the entire English language" with a certain letter combination, which is nearly always related to the lesson of the whole episode. However, his "discoveries" always turn out to be incorrect, as Watson inadvertently points out; as such, his nickname is rather apt. His name is a pun on Alexander Graham Bell, the British-born inventor of the telephone.
- Gus the Rabbit is Lionel's best friend, who is on his class hopping team. He has a reading disability and is still learning. He was afraid to tell Lionel about his problem, but Lionel encouraged him to keep trying and ask for help when he needed it.
- Grandpa Lion is Cleo's father, Lionel and Leona's maternal grandfather, and also the father-in-law of Theo. He visits the library in the episode Out in Outer Space and tells of his friend Ellen Ochoa, the first American Latina in Outer Space. Lionel and Leona even made a biography of Grandpa Lion. He was performed by Martin P. Robinson.
- Aunt Priscilla and Uncle Otto Lion are Lionel and Leona's aunt and uncle, who were told by Cleo that they had 3 newborn cubs in But Mama But, which Cleo visited in the episode. Aunt Priscilla and Uncle Otto would be Cleo's younger sister and Cleo's brother-in-law, the maternal aunt and uncle of Lionel and Leona, and the sister-in-law and brother-in-law of Theo Lion.
- Announcer Bunny is a rabbit in a top hat who acts as the show's announcer. He has a microphone right next to his hat. He appears before the show's opening in the first four seasons, saying something like "Announcer Bunny here! Don't touch that remote, here comes Between the Lions!", at which point a preview of a clip shown in the episode plays and then it goes back to him, saying "If you think that was fun, watch this!" and in the episodes with two segments from Seasons 5-10, he appears to introduce the next episode. He also appears to introduce Arty Smartypants in his segments "Magic Time with the Great Smartini", "Four Words Without Any Assistance Whatsoever" and "Not as Smart as a Puck" and also introduces other segments such as the segments with Bertice Berry (saying "Dr. Bertice Berry with the [letter sound] in [word]!"), Fred Says (in the later seasons (saying "And now, a word from Mr. Fred Newman!") and Monkey Cheerleaders (saying "And now, it's time for those magnificent Monkey Cheerleaders!" while a megaphone appears in front of him before he says "...those magnificent Monkey Cheerleaders!", that bit of which he says through the megaphone). On one occasion, he introduced the Heath the Thesaurus song, "Ten Little Words" (saying "Heath the Thesaurus, Heath the Thesaurus, Heath the Thesaurus! I went to Announcer School."). In some episodes, after a segment with Clay and Walter Pigeon, he would appear to say, "Ha, ha, ha! Pigeons, don't you just love 'em?" In later seasons, he announced the funding for the show. The only time he ever appeared with the lions or in the Library was in "The Goat in the Coat", where he appeared to translate for Sierra the Spanish-speaking mountain lion.

== Cast ==
=== Main ===
- Bertice Berry – Herself
- Alison Fraser – Babs Caplan
- Denyce Graves – Herself
- Fred Newman – Letter sounds, various live-action and sound segments (himself)
- Ruth Westheimer – Dr. Ruth Wordheimer

=== Puppeteers ===
- Pam Arciero – Leona Lion (2002–2010), Dixie Chimps, Zoe
- Anthony Asbury – Lionel Lion (2000–2008)
- Heather Asch – Click the Mouse, Clay Pigeon, Marmy Smartypants
- Jennifer Barnhart – Cleo Lion, Dixie Chimps, Monkey Singer, Information Hen (2002-2010), Leonard "Lenny" T. Lizzard
- Lisa Buckley – Chelsea, Dixie Chimps
- Tyler Bunch – Walter Pigeon (2000), Heath the Thesaurus (2000), Dr. Nitwhite, Johnny, Vowel Boot Camp Letters
- Cheryl Blaylock – Martha Reader (puppetry), Girl Monkey
- David Matthew Feldman – Monkeys, Ducks
- Ed Gale – Orlando
- Keri Horn – Kayree, The Cajun Hound Dog
- James Kroupa – Walter Pigeon (2001–2003)
- Tim Lagasse – Barnaby B. Busterfield III, Arty Smartypants, Gus Rabbit, Watson, Johnny Consonanti, Theo Lion (Understudy during Seasons 3 and 4), Larry the Lost Rock (speaking voice), Icarus, Daedalus, Steve the Bowling Ball, Sergeant Mark, Vowel Boot Camp Letters, Various Characters
- Peter Linz – Theo Lion, Heath the Thesaurus (2001–2002), Announcer Bunny, John Lennon Beetle
- Rick Lyon – Ted the Scientist Monkey
- Noel MacNeal – Lionel Lion (2009–2010), Paul McCartney Beetle, Squeaky Wheel
- Kathryn Mullen – Leona Lion (2000–2001), Vowelles (puppetry), Information Hen (2000–2001)
- Jim Napolitano
- James Godwin - The Buggy Man, Dionysus
- Kenneth Neptune – Harry
- Carmen Osbahr – Grandma Sierra Lion, Vowelles (puppetry)
- Martin P. Robinson – Grandpa Micah Lion
- Matt Vogel – Various Characters, Riffington from Reading Is Fundamental (Designated Reader promo only)

=== Voice cast ===
- Jennifer Barnhart – Most female animated roles, Grey Hand
- Tyler Bunch – Cliff Hanger Narrator (Seasons 6-10), Various Announcers, Pheasant, and the Vacuum Cleaner Vendor
- Scott Dodson – Silver Knight, Ringmaster
- Michael K. Frith – Red Knight, Cliff Hanger Narrator (Seasons 1-5), Sam Spud, Various Narrators
- Peter Linz – Gawain, Polly the Parrot, Boy in Opposite Bunny segments
- Fred Newman – Himself, Golf Announcer, Chicken Jane, Various Narrators, The Lucky Duck, The Boy Who Cried Wolf
- Richard O'Connor – Gold Knight
- Chris Phillips – Cliff Hanger (partially Tim Lagasse), Emoticon the Cat
- Brian Schemmel – Blue Knight
- Miles Purinton – Jeremy
- Jack Berner – Scot
- Kate Berner – Dot, Monica Maxwell
- Christiana Anbri - Wendy/The Punctuator
- Christopher Cerf - Larry the Lost Rock (singing voice)
- Emilio Delgado – The Ram
- Sonia Manzano – Doña Viv/Koyel

=== Guest stars ===
Many celebrities make special guest appearances. Al Roker, India Arie, Jasmine Guy, Ossie Davis alongside his wife Ruby Dee, Bruno Kirby, Denyce Graves, Larry King, Roma Downey, Vanessa E. Williams, Jane Seymour, and Stephon Marbury, have made appearances. Joe Lynn Turner sang a few songs on the show. LeVar Burton appeared alongside the cast in several PBS Kids promotional spots. In addition, characters from other PBS Kids shows have appeared in Between the Lions. Three cast members of Zoom, Rachel Redd, Kenny Yates, and Kaleigh Cronin, have appeared, teaching viewers how to read the word Zoom. Several Sesame Street Muppets made cameos in Season 2 and the "Dance in Smarty Pants" music video.

== Segments ==
Between the Lions often makes wild parodies of (usually children's) programming. The title is a play on words of the phrase "read between the lines" and that many historic library buildings have two lions posted at the main entrance. Thus, one must go "between the lions" to enter the library. Examples of recurring segments (animation and live-action):

The Monkey Pop-Up Theater: A monkey with blonde hair (monkeys are often featured as background characters or library patrons in this series) opens a pop-up book which presents a zany musical performance by monkeys who sing in operatic voices.

The Vowelles: Three colored lips with satin gloves and wigs perform vowel songs for an audience. In the early seasons, a grey hand would pick up the letters of a word from the book and transition them to their segment to establish the vowel and word family of the episode. The Vowelles are usually accompanied by Johnny Consananti and Martha Reader. In the first season, the stage backdrop is not lit, leaving viewers to see only lips, usually satin gloves and feather boas, and hair. In seasons 2–4, the dark stage background is replaced with a colorful silver background obviously revealing that The Vowelles are only three pairs of lips surrounded by wigs, and usually accompanied by satin gloves and feather boas, and the unidentified puppets in the audience are replaced with monkeys and Johnny Consananti is the announcer. Martha Reader and The Vowelles is a parody of Martha Reeves and The Vandellas, a popular Motown group from the 1960s.

The Word Doctor with Dr. Ruth Wordheimer: Dr. Ruth Westheimer portrays "Dr. Ruth Wordheimer", a friendly therapist. Her two types of clients are:

- Monkeys who need help reading or understanding long or difficult words (they are having a "Long Word Freakout").
- Words that are dissatisfied with their current meaning. (By replacing certain well-chosen letters, Dr. Wordheimer can give the word a new meaning and a new lease on life.)

Little Wendy Tales: In a spoof of Sailor Moon (and other anime tropes), an Asian girl with black hair tied in pigtails reads the misadventures found in Little Wendy Tales when sitting next to her white cat, Cuddly Kitty, on her bed. When something goes wrong in the story, the dark-haired girl and Cuddly Kitty transform themselves into The Punctuator and Emoticon the Cat and save Wendy using switching around the punctuation, altering the scene in the process. She then rereads the altered adventures after correcting the sentences.

Fun with Chicken Jane: A parody of the well-known Dick and Jane books for children. In this, two naive children, Scot and Dot, place themselves in pain's way. An intelligent chicken named Chicken Jane spells out an obvious solution to the problem. At the last moment, the children get out of the way, and Chicken Jane gets hurt instead. The theme song is a parody of the Alka-Seltzer jingle. When the skit starts, Scot, Dot, and Chicken Jane come skipping down a dirt road to the jingle that goes "Look, look, see, see, coming down the lane. Here comes Scot, here comes Dot, here comes Chicken Jane!" When the skit is over, Scot and Dot head back up the road (Chicken Jane limping along behind with an injured wing) to "Look, look, see, see, going up the lane. There goes Scot, there goes Dot, there goes Chicken Jane!". In the Episode, "Stop That Chicken", Chicken Jane once fell out of one of the books and ended up in many other books, which are "Colonial America", "Sleeping Beauty", and "Cook A Lot Like Me" by Molly Stewpot (a reference to the famous chef Martha Stewart). The very demanding chef Molly sees Chicken Jane and wants to use her in one of her recipes while ignoring what Chicken Jane is saying. The book is then swatted at in an attempt for Chicken Jane to come to life while jelly is spilled onto Molly in defeat, and Leona succeeds in getting Chicken Jane back in her book.

The Adventures of Cliff Hanger: This common animated segment centers around Cliff Hanger, a lantern-jawed outdoorsman who is usually stranded hundreds of feet above the ground, holding onto a tree branch on the side of a cliff (hence the skit's title). Each episode presents Cliff with a preposterous situation of some kind, which he attempts to use to his advantage by reaching into his backpack, pulling out what he calls his "trusty survival manual", and following the instructions provided there. The instructions, though often highly unconventional, usually prove successful, and Cliff briefly escapes from the cliff. But, inevitably, another highly unlikely incident sends Cliff back to where he started, hanging onto his branch once again. The animated segment then ends when the branch starts cracking as Cliff says his baleful catchphrase: "Can't... hold... on... much... longer!" and the sun sets as a cliffhanger. This scene occurs at the beginning of the animated segment as well. Similar to cartoons such as Wile E. Coyote and Road Runner, these animated segments follow the same storyline; although Cliff never gives up on trying to get off the cliff, he never succeeds. Each segment begins and usually ends with a theme song sung off-screen by a formally dressed group of singers (flying by in a helicopter), singing "Cliff Hanger, hanging from a cliff! And that's why he's called Cliff Hanger!" Cliff attempts to attract their attention to his predicament by calling out "Excuse me! Excuse me!", but to no avail. In one episode, he succeeds at drawing their attention, and they rescue him, but it turns out he is simply dreaming. He once got off the cliff when he jumped on a whale's blowhole and washed up on a beach in "The Last Cliff Hanger" Lionel is upset about the last book, but eventually missed his cliff and, through a series of bizarre events (thanks to the writer, Livingston Dangerously), got himself back onto it. His name is a play on the media term "cliffhanger" which is often shown on non-BTL episodes as "to be continued". In three episodes: Cliff Hanger and the Solid Oil Lamp, Cliff Hanger Meets the Sleeping Gypsy, and Cliff Hanger and the Sheep on a Ship, Cliff Hanger imagines he is in a restaurant eating steak, he is in a bathtub and a starstrucked door. In another episode "Five, Six, and Thistle Sticks", Lionel's best friend Lenny, a lizard, introduces a similarly styled series of books called Justin Time, about a stereotypical explorer named Justin Time who relaxes in a hammock until an absurd scenario like those of Cliff Hanger occurs, forcing him to intervene to restore the calm, boasting, "Couldn't be more comfortable.", as opposed to Cliff Hanger's catchphrase "Can't hold on much longer!" He too used a version of the Survival Manual, called a Safety Manual, which is from his Survival Kit, a version of Cliff Hanger's backpack and the same formally dressed four-piece chorus, riding in the back of a Pickup truck introduces him at the beginning of the story, singing "Justin Time, he's always saved just in time! And that is why he is called Justin Time!" Then Justin rudely tells the singers "Go away!" just like how Cliff Hanger always gets their attention to his predicament. Ironically, Lionel disliked this book. One Justin Time segment was shown as it only appeared in one episode. In the series, the character Lionel is a fan of Cliff Hanger's books, which his sister Leona thinks are pointless. But, even in episodes where she expresses hatred, she shows respect for it, such as when she decides to help Lionel get Livingston Dangerously to write more books.

Gawain's Word: A Wayne's World spoof hosted by a knight with an Golden State surfer accent, featuring two jousting knights charging at each other, each touting a speech balloon with half of a word which then became their respective names, then demonstrating the word. For example, one skit featured "Sir Sh" dressed in silver armor and "Sir Ark" dressed in gold armor. Then Gawain says, "Blend on, dudes!" when it is time to put the halves together. When Sir Sh bumps into Sir Ark, their speech balloons meld together to form the word "shark." Then they react to the word by running away from a hovering shark. Though the title of the segment is a parody of the Saturday Night Live skit, the two knights in the segment speak more characteristically like Bill and Ted from Bill & Ted's Excellent Adventure than Wayne and Garth from Wayne's World.

Tiger Words: A pun of golfer Tiger Woods. Tiger is always seen participating in a spelling competition (modeled off a golf tournament), where he always misspells a word. While the crowd and announcer are surprised and dismayed at his error, Tiger corrects his mistake by using another tool in his pencil bag (using an eraser to fix mistakes in pencil or paint to fix mistakes in pen, for example). Tiger correctly spells the word and wins the championship.

The Trampolini Brothers: The ringmaster introduces three acrobatic brothers, Arturo, Lorenzo, and Felix perform superlative adjectives under the carnival's big top (For example, Arturo is good. Lorenzo is better. Felix is the best.).

Synonym Sam's Lab: A Black girl named Synonym Sam and her dog, Rufus, gain knowledge about synonyms by using Sam's Super Synonym Machine.

Sam Spud: Par-Boiled Potato Detective: A spoof of the Sam Spade detective stories, this segment portrays a par-boiled potato (voiced by Michael K. Frith) who types out the voice-over narration typical of film noir on a late night, making and correcting typographical errors that demonstrate word sounds. This segment makes heavy use of sight gags based on wordplay (such as the narrator referring to the entrance of a "tomato"—1930s slang for an attractive woman—who is revealed to be a real tomato wearing a costume; or a neon sign that blinks the words "Flicker Flicker" or "On" and "Off"). In most cases, the segments would end with a live-action child watching Sam Spud on television and calling out to his or her mother that "there's a talking potato with a hat on and no mouth!" (or some variation), and the mother calling from offscreen telling her child not to worry and that it's educational television, so it must be good for him/her. On one occasion, it ends with the mother saying that it is mean to say "dumb" after a child was describing a pickle with a zipper.

The Un-People: A Mo Willems-styled cartoon segment aimed at teaching kids their prefixes. The main character is "young" Monica Maxwell, a bespectacled Black girl about 8 years old who seems to have an inordinate amount of trouble with a group of rambunctious rhinos or other misfortunes. The segment always begins with the rhinos running amok (or other non-rhino-related situations, such as when Monica marches down a street in a parade), usually in Monica's house. The clever, resourceful girl somehow manages to subdue or round up the rhinos, for example, putting them in a zippered bag (not all these segments have a relationship with rhinos). And, suddenly, the evil Un-People come along and "un-zip" the bag, causing the rhinos to run free again and resume their rampage of destruction (or other misfortune not caused by the animals.) But when the crime-fighting Re-People appear, they "re-zip" the bag, and the destruction of the charging rhinos stops, or other misfortune-quelling results. This segment is a parody of common superhero-themed cartoons such as the Justice League. There are at least two skits that did not feature rhinos—the "undressed"/"redressed" skit where a marching band is seen without clothes, only to get redressed in their outfits, and the "unbuttoned"/"rebuttoned" skit where Monica is seen in the cold winter day while struggling to button her parka, with her parka becoming unbuttoned and then finally rebuttoned.

Silent E: A sly criminal, Silent E, can make the vowel sounds say their names and changes the words without a silent e into words with a silent e, for example: he changes a cub (which resembles Leona) into a cube, a tub into a tube, a twin into twine and a can into a cane. In each segment, Silent E is carted off to jail by a policeman. Silent E then writes a note to the policeman, which usually reads something like, "Sure do like that pin/cap you're wearing! I would love to get a closer look!" The policeman then remarks, "Well, sure! I don't see any harm in that!" The policeman hands the object to Silent E, who then easily escapes by using either the policeman's pin and turning it into a pine to climb out the window or the policeman's cap and turning it into a cape to fly out the window. Either way, after that, the policeman shouts, "Well, Silent E, you may have slipped out of my grasp this time, but mark my words: I'll get you YET!!!!"

Dr. Nitwhite: This sketch usually begins with Dr. Nitwhite ordering in his assistant, Watson (the character most guilty of calling him "Dr. Nitwit"), for Nitwhite claims he has discovered "the only word in the entire English language!" with a particular letter combination in it, showing extreme pride in his achievement. Unfortunately for Nitwhite, Watson casually utters an expression or sentence containing another word with that same combination (for example, in one sketch, Nitwhite proudly presents what he claims to be the only two-letter word with the short 'I' sound: in. An impressed Watson remarks, "Dr. Nitwhite! This time, I think you have really done it!"). After Nitwhite realizes this, he breaks down and advises Watson to leave, which the latter does, calling him "Dr. Nitwit" once more.

Vowel Boot Camp: In this segment, the soldiers, who are lowercase vowels (except the drill sergeant, who is an exclamation point and is revealed to be aptly named Sergeant Mark in one sketch), practice making their sounds and then go out to make words. The famous catchphrase is "This isn't 'Camp [name]', this is Vowel Boot Camp!" In three skits, the lowercase "I" soldier is seen missing a dot before being corrected by the drill instructor, the "U" soldier is seen upside down, looking like a lowercase "N" before being corrected by the drill sergeant to set his head to the proper position and the "O" soldier has a pillow from his footlocker in his mouth before the sergeant (who had told him this on several prior occasions) tells him to spit it out, which he does. Portions of this segment deal with the silent "E" and letters containing two vowels. For example, the "I" soldier is accompanied by two letters, "R" and "P", to form "rip" until the "E" is added at the end of the word to turn the word into "ripe". The drill sergeant then asks the soldiers about the rule, prompting the soldiers to sing the tune "When "E" on the end plays a no-talking game, the vowel before it says its name." The tune would later be the basis for the following examples. Another example is when the "A" soldier is placed between two lowercase consonants "M" and "N" to form the word "man". However, the "I" soldier comes into the word to change it into "main". The drill sergeant then asks the other vowels regarding the rule, prompting them to sing the tune "When two vowels stand side by side, the first one says its name with pride." The sergeant always ends up getting trampled by the vowels as they leave. On one occasion, he misses them, but they end up shutting the door on him, locking him in, causing him to bang on the door.

The Lone Rearranger Rewrites Again: A spoof of The Lone Ranger, this animated segment features an intelligent, banana nose cowboy named The Lone Rerranger, (or Lone for short), with his horse Hiho, and his sidekick whose name is Russell-Upsome Grub, and a sentence which needs to be rearranged. For example, "Horses must ride cowboys into the corral" needs to be rearranged to say "Cowboys must ride horses into the corral". After Lone fixes the sentence with his whip, he, Hiho, and Russell leave, and the people who did what the original sign said for them to do never get a chance to thank him or Russell, or something loosely related to the subject. Afterward, the segment would end with Lone on top of Hiho yelling, "Hi-yo, Hiho! Away!", and then the camera would pan to Russell, who was seen covering his ears and then saying, "Why you must you always yell in that poor horsey's ears?"

Moby Duck: A spoof of Moby-Dick, this takes place in a pea pod (a spoof of Pequod) where there are two captains. The first is Captain Starbuck, and the second is Captain Ahab. Starbuck looks through a telescope and sees a white animal and yells, "Wait, Cap'n! Thar she quacks! Moby, the great white duck!" Captain Ahab takes a closer look and gives the tagline "Nay, Mr. Starbuck! That not be Moby, the great white duck! Argh!", and explains the differences and sounds out syllables, showing, for example, Daisy, the entertaining white snail. The two admit defeat before continuing their search. A running gag is the fact that they never look behind them, which is exactly where Moby is. Another running gag would feature an onscreen assistant throwing water into the face of Ahab, humiliating him. The author is said to be "Melvin Hermille", a spoof of Moby Dick author Herman Melville.

Polly and the Pirate: An animated segment focuses on locative words (such as over, under, next to, and around). A parrot and a blonde-haired pirate (both named Polly) sail the ocean looking for treasure, whatever it may be.

Blending Bowl: A kind of "bowl game" in which NFL players blend sounds to make words. It stars former NFL superstar quarterback turned Fox Sports co-host Terry Bradshaw as a commentator. It is similar to Gawain's Word and Blend Mart but with a football setting.

Opposite Bunny: A superhero bunny who saves the day by turning bad things happening in the neighborhood back into good things. The segment ends with the neighbors reviewing the opposites. For example, one episode has the neighbors saying, "First it was raw; now it is cooked. How does that bunny do it?!"

Arty Smartypants: A farcical and somewhat discombobulated bunraku puppet man with large overalls (which he refers to as his "smarty pants"). He is the start of a few multiple segments:

- "Magic Time With The Great Smartini": Arty puts two, three, or four words in his pants and says a magic word like ebracadebra, or oobracadoobra, then dances to his song - "Ooh ahh, dance in smarty pants ooh agh" - until he has made a compound word and demonstrating it by showing/interacting with the meaning of the word. His assistant/mother is Marmy Smartypants. Due to the popularity of his dance, a short music video was made that featured Arty and various characters from the show (or from other PBS shows) wearing their own "smarty pants" and dancing to the song.
- In some segments, he reads "four words without any assistance whatsoever". Four words appear in each corner of the screen, and he points to them first with his hands, then with his feet. After realizing he is floating in the air, he comically comes crashing down.
- "Not as Smart as a Puck": In this segment, Arty hosts a game show where the contestant wins if they can prove they are not as smart as a hockey puck.
- "Polka King and his Polka Marmy": Arty sings their vowel, plays on his accordion, along with Marmy. The segment is a companion piece to "The Great Smartini".

In later seasons, the segments were replaced with new ones:

- "Short Stories": Arty reads a small board book.
- "Play with Words": Arty changes words into completely different ones.

Swami Marmy: This segment features Smarmy Marmy as a fortune teller who tells monkeys their future. In one segment, she tells a monkey that his sister will drop in for a visit, after which she literally drops in from above. In another segment, she simply tells a monkey, "Oops!" after which Marmy knocks her crystal ball off the table, and it rolls off and breaks.

Fred Says: Fred Newman portraying himself appears onscreen, sounding out a word syllable by syllable, after which he acts it or demonstrates it in his normal humor by attaching sounds to each syllable. On many occasions, Fred would appear doing his segment twice in the first season.

What's Cooking? with Theo and Cleo: A cooking segment starring Theo and Cleo Lion as chefs. In each segment, they have a recipe and all the things they need (and a few they do not need) in front of them with their names on them (For example, "Slammed and Rammed Ham with No Yam or Clam"). They read the recipe step-by-step, which usually involves getting rid of the extra ingredient and doing something (rather literally) to the main item before placing it in something. When they reach the last step, which involves cooking the food for a certain amount of time, they just say "Nah" and eat it raw. Sometimes, the camera zooms in on the refrigerator and segues into a Sam Spud segment.

The Joy Learno Show: Female parody of the former late-night host Jay Leno talks to several guests about words and their meanings.

Marmy's Poetry Corner: This segment features Marmy with guest stars.

Replacing Letter Songs: Each song for the vowels, such as "a" and "e", etc. This is sung in different words, such as "Ben" and "hen". In the end, a letter is replaced such as "t" and changes a letter to "ten". Heath the Thesaurus would sometimes introduce the segment by saying, "And now, a little poem in which letters change, and make something very interesting happen."

== Episodes ==
Season	Episodes	Originally released	
Season	Episodes	First released	Last released
1	30	April 3, 2000	May 12, 2000
2	25	April 2, 2001	May 4, 2001
3	10	September 16, 2002	November 18, 2002
4	5	September 15, 2003	September 19, 2003
5	10	April 18, 2005	June 21, 2005
6	10	April 17, 2006	June 19, 2006
7	10	September 17, 2007	November 19, 2007
8	10	September 15, 2008	November 17, 2008
9	10	September 21, 2009	November 23, 2009
10	10	September 20, 2010	November 22, 2010

== Format ==
Between the Lions focuses on teaching reading and a love of books to young children in a fun, informative way.

Among the educational techniques used by Between the Lions are the following:

- Featured Letters and Sounds – Every episode has a featured letter or sound, such as 'h' or 'the long ee sound'. Throughout the show, the featured letter or sound is heard and seen in a variety of words. In seasons 7 and 8, an ad shows what's coming up next, followed by a hand grabbing a letter from the word, usually from the first book.
- Text on Screen – Frequently, keywords or entire sentences of dialogue are shown on screen as the characters talk, with the featured letter or combination highlighted. The gray glove then grabs or puts it back in its place after its segment.
- Stories – Every episode contains one or more short stories in the form of books read by the Lion family. These stories tie in thematically with the rest of the episode and also serve as another way to present words with the featured sound in context. Sometimes the stories are real books (like "Sylvester and the Magic Pebble" by William Steig, "Joseph Had a Little Overcoat" by Simms Taback, and "The Carrot Seed" by Ruth Krauss) or well-known tales (like "Rumplestiltskin", "The Little Red Hen", and "The Gingerbread Man"); other times they are books that are made-up to fit the episode (like How Pecos Bill Cleans Up the West and Lionel's favorite book, Nothing but Lug Nuts).
- Songs – Silly but informative songs sum up the rules of English spelling and pronunciation in easy-to-remember ways, with lyrics like "When two vowels go walking, the first one does the talking" or "Even the blues would be blue without an s" and many others. Often, the text of the song is shown on screen. The songs for the show are by Thomas Z. Shepard, Christopher Cerf, Sarah Durkee and Paul Jacobs.
- Animations and skits – A variety of animations and skits show how words are formed and how one word can be changed into another by adding or removing letters.
- Definitions – Whenever a long or unusual word is used in a dialogue or story, a quick definition is given. Usually, it is subtly worked into the conversation, such as when one of the parents responds to a question from the children. Other times it may be provided in a humorous way, such as when Heath Thesaurus pokes his head in to define a word. Occasionally, words may be defined by showing pictures or other artistic methods.
- Repeated Vocabulary – Various vocabulary words are introduced in each episode, ranging from simple, everyday concepts such as "jump" and "read" to more complex words like "sequel", "dictionary", or "drought". After a word has been introduced, it is usually used some times throughout the episode.

In addition to teaching basic reading, pronunciation, and grammar skills, Between the Lions also strives to promote a general love of reading in its viewers. It explores the many subjects that books can cover and shows how diverse people may enjoy reading different things. It also demonstrates the value of reference books and the importance of reading in other everyday activities like using a computer, cooking with a recipe, or finding your way with street signs.

Some Between the Lions episodes also deal with larger episodes related to literary matters: How to handle the scary parts of a story, for example, or the fact that it's okay to be a little sad or scared if something bad happens to a character that you like in a book. It also shows how children can use books as jumping points for their own imagination.

Above all, every character on the show expresses a contagious enthusiasm for reading, with the underlying message being "Reading is cool".

The show's curriculum director, Linda Rath, not only had been a working elementary-schoolteacher for many years specializing in reading but also has a PhD from the Harvard Graduate School of Education (where she obtained a master's before becoming a schoolteacher), working with reading specialist professor Jeanne Chall. The program's educational effectiveness has been researched in several studies.

== Awards ==
=== Daytime Emmy Awards ===
The series was nominated for 45 Daytime Emmy Awards and won 10.

Year	Category	Nominee(s)	Result
2001	Outstanding Music Direction and Composition	Paul Jacobs, Christopher Cerf, Sarah Durkee and Thomas Z. Shepard	Nominated
2001	Outstanding Sound Editing - Special Class	Robert Schott, Andy Erice, Christopher Fina and Brian Beatrice	Nominated
2001	Outstanding Children's Series	Judith Stoia, Michael K. Frith, Norman Stiles, Christopher Cerf, Sonia Rosario, Elizabeth Benjes	Nominated
2001	Outstanding Writing in a Children's Series	Norman Stiles, Louise Gikow, Christopher Cerf, Diana DeCubellis, Sarah Durkee, Joe Fallon, Michael K. Frith, Peter K. Hirsch, Sean Kelly, Sharon Lerner, Kathryn Mullen, Fred Newman, Belinda Ward, Kathy Waugh, Ellis Weiner, Tom Whedon, Richard Chevat	Nominated
2001	Outstanding Achievement in Single Camera Editing	Vincent J. Straggas, Laura Cheshire, Jordan Montminy	Won
2001	Outstanding Achievement in Main Title Design	Randall Balsmeyer, Amit Sethi, Daniel Leung, Matt McDonald	Won
2001	Outstanding Achievement in Art Direction/Set Decoration/Scenic Design	Jim Fenhagen, Erik Ulfers, Laura Brock, Martin Fahrer, David Harwell	Won
2002	Outstanding Sound Editing - Special Class	Robert Schott, Brian Beatrice, Christopher Fina	Nominated
2002	Outstanding Single Camera Editing	Vincent J. Straggas, Laura Cheshire, Terry Cafaro	Nominated
2002	Outstanding Children's Series	Judith Stoia, Michael K. Frith, Christopher Cerf, Norman Stiles, Carol Klein, Michele McDonough	Nominated
2002	Outstanding Achievement in Lighting Direction	Bill Berner, Mitchell Bogard	Won
2002	Outstanding Achievement in Costume Design/Styling	John Orberg, James J. Kroupa, Matt Stoddart, Janet Kuhl	Nominated
2002	Outstanding Achievement in Art Direction/Set Decoration/Scenic Design	Laura Brock, Sonia Alio, Jessica A. Milstein, Jim Fenhagen, Erik Ulfers, David Harewell	Nominated
2003	Outstanding Single Camera Editing	Vincent J. Straggas, Tim Lagasse, Therese Cafaro, Kristi Kilkenny	Nominated
2003	Outstanding Writing in a Children's Series	Norman Stiles, Louise Gikow, Joe Fallon, Ken Scarborough, Fred Newman, Carin Greenberg, Sarah Durkee, Gentry Menzel, Sharon Lerner, Christopher Cerf	Nominated
2003	Outstanding Children's Series	Judith Stoia, Christopher Cerf, Norman Stiles, Carol Klein, Michele McDonough	Nominated
2003	Outstanding Achievement in Music Direction and Composition	Paul Jacobs, Sarah Durkee, Christopher Cerf, Thomas Z. Shepard, Chris Cardillo	Nominated
2003	Outstanding Directing in a Children's Series	Lisa Simon, Emily Squires, Richard A. Fernandes, Bill Berner	Nominated
2003	Outstanding Achievement in Costume Design/Styling	John Orberg, James J. Kroupa, Janet Kuhl, Matt Stoddart	Nominated
2003	Outstanding Achievement in Art Direction/Set Decoration/Scenic Design	Laura Brock, Jim Fenhagen, Michael K. Frith, Evelyn Sakash, Jessica A. Milstein	Won
2004	Outstanding Music Direction and Composition	Paul Jacobs, Christopher Cerf, Sarah Durkee, Thomas Z. Shephard, Fred Newman, Sharon Lerner, Chris Cardillo	Nominated
2004	Outstanding Achievement in Single Camera Editing	Jordan Montminy, Kristi Kilkenny, Vincent J. Straggas, Therese Cafaro, Tim Lagasse	Nominated
2004	Outstanding Writing in a Children's Series	Norman Stiles, Christopher Cerf, Sarah Durkee, Joe Fallon, Louise Gikow, Carin Greenberg, Sean Kelly, Sharon Lerner, Brian Meehl, Gentry Menzel, Fred Newman, Ken Scarborough	Won
2004	Outstanding Children's Series	Judith Stoia, Norman Stiles, Christopher Cerf, Brigid Sullivan, Carol Klein, Michele McDonough, Beth Kirsch	Nominated
2004	Outstanding Directing in a Children's Series	Lisa Simon, Emily Squires, Scott Preston	Nominated
2004	Outstanding Achievement in Costume Design/Styling	John Orberg, James J. Kroupa, Michael K. Frith, Janet Kuhl, Matt Stoddart, Kathryn Mullen, Tim Lagasse	Nominated
2004	Outstanding Achievement in Art Direction/Set Decoration/Scenic Design	Laura Brock, Jim Fenhagen, Michael K. Frith, Evelyn Sakash, Jessica A. Milstein	Nominated
2006	Outstanding Writing in a Children's Series	Norman Stiles, Louise Gikow, Christopher Cerf, Gentry Menzel, Bill Shribman, Sarah Durkee	Nominated
2006	Outstanding Children's Series	Judith Stoia, Brigid Sullivan, Christopher Cerf, Norman Stiles, Diane Hartman, Carol Klein, Beth Kirsch	Nominated
2006	Outstanding Art Direction/Set Decoration/Scenic Design	Laura Brock, Karen Wing	Nominated
2007	Outstanding Achievement in Single Camera Editing	Vincent J. Straggas	Nominated
2007	Outstanding Original Song - Children's/Animated	Sarah Durkee, Paul Jacobs for "Q Without U"	Won
2007	Outstanding Art Direction/Set Decoration/Scenic Design	Laura Brock, Karen Wing	Nominated
2008	Outstanding Achievement in Music Direction and Composition	Paul Jacobs, Sarah Durkee, Christopher Cerf	Nominated
2008	Outstanding Achievement in Art Direction/Set Decoration/Scenic Design	Laura Brock, Karen Wing, Jerel Levanway, Bill Reinhart, Jack Thomas, Mary Goodson, Ray Green, Jimmy Thrasher	Nominated
2008	Outstanding Writing in a Children's Series	Norman Stiles, Ray Messecar, Peter K. Hirsch, Brian Meehl, Jennifer Hamburg, Sarah Durkee, Luis Santeiro, Christopher Cerf, Beth Kirsch, Fred Newman, Judith Stoia, Candy Kugel	Won
2008	Outstanding Pre-School Children's Series	Christopher Cerf, Norman Stiles, Judith Stoia, Brigid Sullivan, Bill Berner, Chris Cardillo, Philippa Hall, Diane Hartman, Rick Klein, Scott Colwell, Beth Kirsch, Carol Klein	Nominated
2009	Outstanding Writing in a Children's Series	Norman Stiles, Judith Stoia, Beth Kirsch, Christopher Cerf, Fred Newman, Luis Santeiro, Sarah Durkee, Ray Messecar, Jennifer Hamburg, Brian Meehl, Louise Gikow, Keri Horn	Won
2009	Outstanding Pre-School Children's Series	Judith Stoia, Christopher Cerf, Norman Stiles, Brigid Sullivan, Beth Kirsch, Rick Klein, Bill Berner, Diane Hartman, Chris Cardillo, Philippa Hall, Scott Colwell, Carol Klein	Won
2010	Outstanding Pre-School Children's Series	Judith Stoia, Christopher Cerf, Norman Stiles, Brigid Sullivan, Marie Antoon, Beth Kirsch, Bill Berner, Philippa Hall, Chris Cardillo, Rachel Ford, Scott Colwell, Lisa Simon	Nominated
2010	Outstanding Original Song - Children's and Animation	Paul Jacobs, Sarah Durkee for "It's a p-h!"	Nominated
2011	Outstanding Achievement in Sound Mixing - Live Action and Animation	Nick Cipriano, Joe Franco, Jeff Malinowski, Jared O'Connell, John Kanakis, Matt Longoria	Nominated
2011	Outstanding Pre-School Children's Series	Judith Stoia, Brigid Sullivan, Christopher Cerf, Norman Stiles, Marie Antoon, Beth Kirsch, Lisa Simon, Scott Colwell, Bill Berner, Chris Cardillo, Rachel Ford	Nominated
2011	Outstanding Music Direction and Composition	Paul Jacobs, Sarah Durkee, Christopher Cerf	Nominated
2011	Outstanding Achievement in Art Direction/Set Decoration/Scenic Design	Laura Brock, Karen Wing, Jerel Levanway, Jack Thomas, Bill Reinhart, Ray Green, Jimmy Thrasher, Mary Goodson	Nominated

=== Other Awards ===
Date	Award	Organization
2000	Gold Award: Best Show for Kids Aged 4–7	Parents' Choice Awards
2000	Outstanding Achievement in Children's Programming	Television Critics Association
2000	Silver World Award	New York Festivals
2000	Best Children's Entertainment Site	Massachusetts Interactive Media Council
2000	Gold Award for Web Site	New Media Invision Awards
2000	Honorable Mention, "Leading the Way to Literacy" Video	48th Columbus International Film and Video Festival
2000	Parents Guide to Children's Media Award, "Leading the Way to Literacy" Video	Parents Guide to Children's Media, Inc.
2001	Parents' Guide to Children's Media Award	Parent's Guide to Children's Media, Inc.
2001	Broadcast Media Award for Television	International Reading Association
2001	Most Worthwhile Kids' TV Show	Woman's World Magazine
2001	Outstanding Achievement in Children's Programming	Television Critics Association
2001	Outstanding Educational/Instructional Program	Boston/New England Emmy Awards
2001	Notable Children's Web Site	American Library Association
2001	Best Parent and Teacher Information on a PBS Site	PBS Online's Eddie Awards
2002	Gold Award: Best Show for Kids Aged 4–7	Parents' Choice Awards
2002	Nomination for Outstanding Achievement in Children's Programming	Television Critics Association
2002	Winner of Video Media Award, "The Ram in the Pepper Patch"	Parenting Magazine
2003	Parents' Guide to Children's Media Award	Parent's Guide to Children's Media, Inc.
2003	Gold Award: Best Show for Kids Aged 4–7	Parents' Choice Awards
2003	Finalist Award for Children's Periodicals for Between the Lions: Activities for Families with Children, Ages 3 to 5	Association of Educational Publishers (Ed Press)
2004	International Finalist, Television for Children Under 6	Prix Jeunesse
2004	Gold Award: Web Site for Kids Aged 4–7	Parents' Choice Awards
2004	Eliot Pearson Award for Excellence in Children's Programming	Tufts University Department of Child Development

== Broadcast ==
Between the Lions premiered on PBS Kids in the United States on April 3, 2000, replacing The Puzzle Place on the schedule lineup. The last episode aired on November 22, 2010, with reruns continuing through August 31, 2011. The show is no longer broadcast on PBS Kids, nor is it available on any streaming platform. However, some video clips and other online resources remain available online for educators.
