= Something for Nothing =

Something for Nothing may refer to:

- Something for Nothing (album), by French rock band Chunk! No, Captain Chunk!
- Something for Nothing (2004 film), starring Juanita Jennings as Mrs. Lassiter
- Something for Nothing (1940 film), starring Rube Goldberg
- "Something for Nothing", a song by Rush from the 1976 album 2112
- Something for Nothing (book), a 1954 book by Robert Sheckley

== See also ==
- Something from Nothing (disambiguation)
- "Sumthin' for Nuthin'", a song by Mötley Crüe from the 1987 album Girls, Girls, Girls
