= Bertice Berry =

American sociologist

Bertrice Berry
- Born: 1960 (age 65–66)
- Education: Jacksonville University (BA, DHL); Kent State University (MA, PhD)
- Occupations: Sociologist; author; lecturer; educator
- Website: berticeberrynow.com

Bertice Berry (born 1960) is an American sociologist, author, lecturer, and educator.

== Early life and education ==
Berry grew up in Wilmington, Delaware, as one of seven children raised by a single mother. The family was poor and her mother struggled with alcoholism. In a 1994 article, Berry reflected on her upbringing and her mother's abusiveness when she was "in one of her frightening stages of drunkenness." Berry ultimately forgave her mother, writing that "her drinking was a way to mask her own pain. I think of the burden she endured as a black woman with few resources for herself or her children."

Despite being told that she should give up on attending college, Berry graduated with a B.A. degree, magna cum laude, from Jacksonville University in Florida in 1982. She subsequently obtained an M.A. degree in 1986 and a Ph.D. degree in 1988, both in sociology from Kent State University in Ohio. In 1994, she was awarded an honorary D.H.L. degree by Jacksonville University.

== Career ==
After completing her doctorate, Berry taught sociology at Kent State University. In the early 1990s, she left academia to work as an entertainer, lecturer and comedian. She was the host and co-executive producer of her own nationally syndicated talk show, The Bertice Berry Show, from 1993 to 1994. According to legend, the show's September 1993 debut was delayed by news coverage of the Oslo I Accord; when the show finally aired an hour later, Berry quipped "We've got peace, now here's Bertice." Alas, the show never found an audience and production shut down seven months later, in summer 1994.

Besides having her own talk show, Berry has also appeared on The Oprah Winfrey Show, The Tonight Show with Jay Leno, TEDx Talk, CBS Nightwatch, CNN's Crossfire and Sonya Live.

She is the author of two memoirs entitled The World According to Me (1996) and I'm On My Way, But Your Foot Is On My Head: A Black Woman's Story of Getting Over Life's Hurdles (1997), as well as several novels. She also wrote The Ties That Bind: A Memoir of Race, Memory and Redemption (2009) about her African American heritage. Berry's self-help book about her weight-loss journey is entitled A Year to Wellness and Other Weight Loss Secrets (2010) and it won an NAACP Image Award for Outstanding Literary Work (Instructional) in 2012.

Berry lives in Savannah, Georgia, where she is the co-owner of Iona's Gallery & Great Finds.

== Bibliography ==
1. Walk With Purpose, Collide With Destiny
2. A Year To Wellness; And Other Weight Loss Secrets
3. The Ties That Bind: A Memoir of Race, Memory, and Redemption (2009)
4. When Love Calls, You Better Answer (2006)
5. Jim and Louella's Homemade Heart-fix Remedy: A Novel (2003)
6. Redemption Song: A Novel (2001)
7. Haunting of Hip Hop (2001)
8. I'm on My Way but Your Foot Is on My Head: A Black Woman's Story of Getting Over Life's Hurdles (1997)
9. You Still Ghetto: You Know You're Still Ghetto If... (1997)
10. Sckraight From The Ghetto: You Know You're Ghetto If . . .(1996)
11. BERTICE: The World According to Me (1996)
