= Nothing from Nothing (disambiguation) =

"Nothing from Nothing" is a 1974 Billy Preston song.

Nothing from Nothing may also refer to:

- Nothing from Nothing (EP), by Ayumi Hamasaki
- Nothing from Nothing, a digital album by Watchtower
- "Nothing From Nothing Leaves Nothing", a song by Johnnie Morisette on the 1970 album Etta James Sings Funk
