= David McPhail (author) =

American author and illustrator

- Born: June 30, 1940 (age 86); Newburyport, Massachusetts, USA
- Education: School of the Museum of Fine Arts
- Occupation: Writer
- Spouse(s): Janis Lazarian (m. 1966) Jan L. Waldron
- Children: 7

David Michael McPhail (born 1940) is an American writer and illustrator of over 200 children's books.

== Early life and education ==
David Michael McPhail was born June 30, 1940, in Newburyport, Massachusetts, to Bernard E. and Rachel (née Cutter) McPhail. His father worked in sales, and his mother was a secretary.

He attended the Vesper George School of Art from 1957 to 1968, then the School of the Museum of Fine Arts from 1963 to 1966.

== Career ==
McPhail published his first book, The Bear's Toothache, in 1972. He has since published over 200 children's books, including illustrating some of his wife's books.

== Notable awards and honors ==
=== Illustration ===
Two books McPhail illustrated are Junior Library Guild selections: Martha Freeman's The Orphan and the Mouse (2014) and Albert Lamb's Tell Me the Day Backwards (2011).

In 1975, The New York Times named X. J. Kennedy's One Winter Night in August among their "Outstanding Books of the Year". The same year, Emilie Warren McLeod's The Bear's Bicycle was an honor book for the Boston Globe–Horn Book Award for Picture Book.

In 2012, the Association for Library Service to Children named Albert Lamb's Tell Me the Day Backwards one of the year's Notable Children's Books.

=== Writing ===
Five books McPhail's wrote and illustrated are Junior Library Guild selections: Edward and the Pirates (1997), Mole Music (1999), Edward in the Jungle (2002), The Teddy Bear (2002), and Beatrix Potter and Her Paint Box (2015).

In 1997, The New York Times named Edward and the Pirates in their "Notable Books of the Year 1997" list. In 2009, the Smithsonian Institution included Budgie & Boo on their list of "Notable Books for Children".

=== Other ===
Big Brown Bear's Up and Down Day, a 24-minute video adaptation, was named a 2008 Notable Children's Video by the Association for Library Service to Children.

== Personal life ==
McPhail married Janis Lazarian on July 2, 1966. The couple had three children (Tristian, Joshua, and Gabrian) before divorcing.

McPhail later remarried, becoming the father to three step-children. He also had a child (Jaime) with his second wife.

As of 2010, McPhail was married to author and artist Jan L. Waldron.

== Selected publications ==
=== Authored ===
- McPhail, David M. (1984), Fix-it, New York: E. P. Dutton, ISBN 978-0-525-44093-2, OCLC 1200362204
- McPhail, David (1987). First Flight. Boston: Little, Brown and Company. ISBN 978-0-316-56323-9. OCLC 14904342.
- McPhail, David (1990). Lost!. New York: Little, Brown, and Company. ISBN 978-0-316-56336-9. OCLC 235945704.
- McPhail, David (1997). Edward and the Pirates. Boston: Little, Brown and Company. ISBN 978-0-316-56344-4. OCLC 33078567.
- MacPhail, David (1999). Mole Music. New York: Holt. ISBN 978-0-8050-2819-5. OCLC 245700637.
- McPhail, David (2005). The Teddy Bear. New York: Henry Holt & Company. ISBN 978-0-8050-7882-4. OCLC 1003804456.
- McPhail, David (2015). Beatrix Potter and her Paint Box. New York: Henry Holt and Company. ISBN 978-0-8050-9170-0. OCLC 904011808.

=== Illustrated ===
- McPhail, David; Folkmanis, Inc (1972), The Bear's Toothache, Little, Brown Books for Young Readers, ISBN 978-0-316-56325-3, OCLC 45075577
- Valen, Nanine (1978). Tee Devil's Tail. New York: Charles Scribner's Sons.
