= Something for Nothing (book) =

1954 short story by Robert Sheckley

- Author: Robert Sheckley
- Language: English
- Genre: Story
- Publisher: Galaxy Science Fiction
- Publication date: 1954
- Publication place: United States
- Media type: Print

Something for Nothing is a humorous story by the science fiction writer Robert Sheckley. It was first published in the journal Galaxy Science Fiction in 1954 and in the collection Citizen in Space in 1955.

== Plot ==
Waking up one morning, Joe Collins unexpectedly finds in his room a cube with the inscription “Class A Recycler”. After some experimentation, he comes to the conclusion that this is what he had always dreamed of - something that will give him everything he desires. He orders palaces and oil wells, money and cars, herds of pedigree cattle and ballet troupes. One day he asks for immortality. Later he learns that the cube is a device for ordering things, but he still has to pay for the things. However, he still gets something for nothing: namely, immortality, which he gets for free - in order to work off his debt in marble quarries for several thousand years.

== Adaptations ==
- An adaptation for a short film, The Utilizer, co-written by Sheckley, was broadcast on the Sci-Fi Channel (now Syfy) in 1996. Director Craig Barron, won the Best special effects award for the film from the Chicago International Film Festival.
- A Russian adaptation, set in the 1930s, was shot in 2015.

== Literature ==
- Encyclopedia for Children. World Literature. T. 2 / chapters. ed. V. Volodin - M: Avanta +, 2001. - P. 568.
