= Joseph Had a Little Overcoat =

1999 book by Simms Taback

- Joseph Had a Little Overcoat cover
- Author: Simms Taback
- Illustrator: Simms Taback
- Genre: Children’s book
- Publisher: Viking Press
- Publication date: 1999
- Publication place: United States
- ISBN: 978-0-670-87855-0
- OCLC: 40159006
- Dewey Decimal: 398.2 E 21
- LC Class: PZ7.T1115 Jo 1999

Joseph Had a Little Overcoat is a 1999 children’s picture book by Simms Taback that won the 2000 Caldecott Medal. The book is a re-illustrated version of a book of the same name by Taback that was published in 1977. The protagonist is Joseph, a Jewish farmer, who has a little striped overcoat. When it grows old, Joseph makes it into a little jacket and so on until he makes it into a button. Ultimately, Joseph loses the button, but is prompted to write a book based on his experiences. The moral of the story is "you can always make something out of nothing." In 2001, an 11-minute animated film based on the book, directed by Daniel Ivanick and narrated by Rob Reiner, was made by Weston Woods Studios, Inc.

The story has die-cut illustrations consisting of watercolor and collage. Readers of the story say that Joseph greatly resembles Simms Taback.

Joseph Had a Little Overcoat is based on the Yiddish song I Had a Little Overcoat. Barbara Kiefer, chair of the Caldecott Award Committee, commented, "Vibrant rich colors, playful details, and skillfully-placed die cuts contribute to the books raucous merriment that takes this Yiddish folk song far beyond the simple words."

An animated version of the book was read on the children's show Between the Lions.

== Reception ==
Joseph Had a Little Overcoat has been favorably received. Publishers Weekly found "With its effective repetition and an abundance of visual humor, this is tailor-made for reading aloud." while Common Sense Media wrote "it will nudge its way onto your list of favorites." Booklist called it "a true example of accomplished bookmaking" and "Taback's mixed-media and collage illustrations are alive with warmth, humor, and humanity. Their colors are festive yet controlled, and they are filled with homey clutter, interesting characters, and a million details to bring children back again and again." The School Library Journal described it as "A book bursting at the seams with ingenuity and creative spirit."

== Awards ==
- 1999: National Jewish Book Award for Children's Picture Book
- 2000: Caldecott Medal for U.S. picture book illustration

== See also ==
- Something from Nothing another children's book based on the same story.

Awards
| Preceded by Snowflake Bentley | Caldecott Medal recipient 2000 | Succeeded by So You Want to Be President? |
| Preceded by You Never Know | National Jewish Book Award recipient 1999 | Succeeded by Moishe's Miracle |
