= Simms Taback =

American writer and illustrator (1932 – 2011)

- Born: February 13, 1932; The Bronx, New York, US
- Died: December 25, 2011 (aged 79); Ventura, California, US
- Education: Cooper Union for the Advancement of Art
- Occupations: Illustrator, writer, graphic designer
- Writing career
- Period: 1964–2011 (illustrator)
- Genre: children's picture books
- Notable work: Joseph Had a Little Overcoat (1999)
- Notable awards: Caldecott Medal; 2000

Simms Taback (February 13, 1932 – December 25, 2011) was an American writer, graphic artist, and illustrator of more than 35 books. He won the 2000 Caldecott Medal for U.S. picture book illustration, recognizing Joseph Had a Little Overcoat, and was a runner-up in 1998 for There Was an Old Lady Who Swallowed a Fly.

== Biography ==
He was born to a working family of a housepainter and a seamstress, socialists and labor organizers. His first name is after Harry Simms, Jewish labor leader.

Taback graduated from the Cooper Union for the Advancement of Art and served in the United States Army during the Korean War. He was a designer for CBS Records and The New York Times. He was the founder and president of the Illustrators Guild (later the New York Graphic Artists Guild) and taught art at the School of Visual Arts and Syracuse University.

Taback designed the first McDonald's Happy Meal box in 1977. He died in 2011 of pancreatic cancer.

== Selected works ==
- Jabberwocky and Other Nonsense (Harlin Quist, 1964), three poems by Lewis Carroll, 1871 to 1889
- Too Much Noise (1967), by Ann McGovern
- Joseph Had a Little Overcoat (Random House, 1977), movable book based on a Yiddish folk song
- Jason's Bus Ride (1987), by Harriet Ziefert
- Road Builders (1994), by B. G. Hennessy
- Sam's Wild West Show (1995), by Nancy Antle
- Two Little Witches: A Halloween Counting Story (1996), by Harriet Ziefert
- There Was an Old Lady Who Swallowed a Fly (1997), illustrating the American folk poem
- Joseph Had a Little Overcoat (Viking, 1999) —the Caldecott Medal-winning edition for U.S. picture book illustration
- This Is the House That Jack Built (2002), based on the nursery rhyme
- Kibitzers and Fools: Tales My Zayda (Grandfather) Told Me (2005), traditional Jewish tales
- I Miss You Every Day (2007)

== Original works ==
- Animal Parade
  - City Animals
  - Dinosaurs
  - Farm Animals
  - Safari Animals
- Quack Like A Duck!
- Who Am I?
- Who Said Moo?
- Where Is My Baby?
- Where Is My Friend?

== Awards ==
=== Winner ===
- 1999: National Jewish Book Award for Joseph Had a Little Overcoat
- 2000: Caldecott Medal for U.S. picture book illustration for Joseph Had a Little Overcoat

=== Finalist ===
- 1998: Caldecott Medal for U.S. picture book illustration for There Was an Old Lady Who Swallowed a Fly.

== See also ==
Reynold Ruffins
