= Sesame Street characters =

Characters from a children's TV show

A wide variety of characters have appeared on the American children's television series Sesame Street. Many of the characters are Muppets, which are puppets made in Jim Henson's distinctive puppet-creation style. Most of the non-Muppet characters are human characters, but there are many characters that are animated.

== General information ==
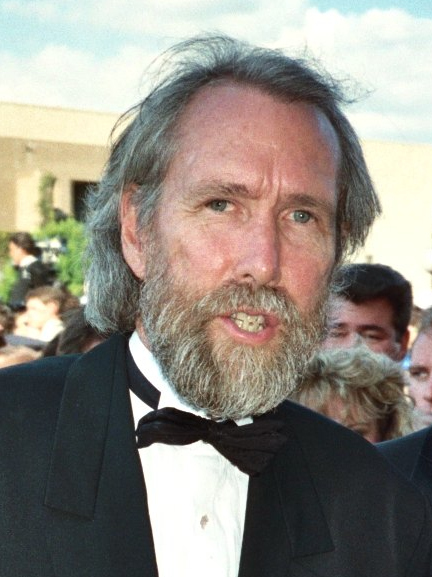
Jim Henson, creator of The Muppets, in 1989

Jim Henson created many Muppet characters for the purpose of appearing on Sesame Street. His involvement with the show began when he and one of the creators, Joan Ganz Cooney, met in the summer of 1968 at one of the show's five three-day curriculum planning seminars in Boston. Author Christopher Finch reported that director Jon Stone, who had worked with Henson previously, felt that if they could not bring him on board, they should "make do without puppets".

Henson was initially reluctant, but he agreed to join Sesame Street for social goals. He also agreed to waive his performance fee for full ownership of the Sesame Street Muppets and to split any revenue they generated with the Children's Television Workshop, the series' non-profit producer. The Muppets were a crucial part of the show's popularity and it brought Henson national attention. In early research, the Muppet segments of the show scored high, and more Muppets were added during the first few seasons. The Muppets were effective teaching tools because children easily recognized them, they were predictable, and they appealed to adults and older siblings.

During the production of Sesame Street's first season, producers created five one-hour episodes to test the show's appeal to children and examine their comprehension of the material. Not intended for broadcast, they were presented to preschoolers in 60 homes throughout Philadelphia and in daycare centers in New York City in July 1969. The results were "generally very positive"; children learned from the shows, their appeal was high, and children's attention was sustained over the full hour. However, the researchers found that although children's attention was high during the Muppet segments, their interest wavered during the "Street" segments, when no Muppets were on screen. This was because the producers had followed the advice of child psychologists who were concerned that children would be confused if human actors and Muppets were shown together. As a result of this decision, the appeal of the test episodes was lower than the target.

The Street scenes were "the glue" that "pulled the show together", so producers knew that they needed to make significant changes. The producers decided to reject the advisers' advice and reshot the Street segments; Henson and his coworkers created Muppets that could interact with the human actors. These test episodes were directly responsible for what writer Malcolm Gladwell called "the essence of Sesame Street—the artful blend of fluffy monsters and earnest adults". Since 2001, the full rights for the Sesame Street Muppets have been owned by Sesame Workshop, as the CTW was renamed in 2000.

=== Muppets ===
==== Big Bird ====
- Performed by Caroll Spinney (1969–2018) Daniel Seagren (stand-in, 1969; 1970)), Rick Lyon (2003; only in Season 33), Matt Vogel (1996; 1997–present)

One of the series' three main protagonists, along with Elmo and Cookie Monster, and the first Muppet to appear on the show was Big Bird, a curious 8-foot-2-inch tall yellow bird believed by writer Shalom M. Fisch and Dr. Lewis Bernstein to be a canary, who resides in a large nest alongside the "123 Sesame Street" building and represents the 6-year-old child with his tendency to question everything. On special days, he wears a white collar and colorful necktie. Big Bird's best friend is Aloysius Snuffleupagus (better known as "Snuffy"), who was portrayed as the bird's imaginary friend from the adults' perspectives until revealed to the human cast in 1985.

==== Oscar the Grouch ====
- Performed by Caroll Spinney (1969–2018), Eric Jacobson (2015–present)

Also living outside of the building is Oscar the Grouch, a trash can-dwelling creature belonging to his own unique species, who is portrayed as a habitual pessimist and was designed to give children "permission to feel grouchy—and to demonstrate differing opinions". Oscar and Big Bird were specifically created for the reshooting of the "Street" scenes with the idea that they would be able to interact with the human characters. For his part, Oscar has several friends of his own despite his pessimism; these include the Grouch's pet worm, Slimey, and his girlfriend Grundgetta.

==== Bert and Ernie ====
- Bert: Performed by Frank Oz (1969–2006), Eric Jacobson (1999–present)
- Ernie: Performed by Jim Henson (1969–1990), Steve Whitmire (1993–2014), John Tartaglia (2003, Play with Me Sesame), Billy Barkhurst (2014–2017), Peter Linz (2017–present)

Two other Muppets who have appeared on the show since its beginning are Bert and Ernie, a pair of best friends with contrasting personalities; Ernie is portrayed as a free-spirited trickster who loves his rubber duck, while Bert is the world-weary foil to his friend's naïve trouble-making, and shows himself to be obsessed with things like pigeons and paper clips.

The debate on these characters' sexuality is highly disputed, but as of September 2018, Bert and Ernie are confirmed to not have any sexuality, nor do any other Sesame Street characters.

==== Cookie Monster ====
- Performed by Frank Oz (1969–2001; 2004), David Rudman (2001–present)

Also appearing on the show are an unidentified species of furry characters referred to as "monsters". Among these are Cookie Monster, a fuzzy, blue gluttonous monster with a baritone voice, who is most famously addicted to the baked goods for which he is named but ironically also likes enjoying healthy foods as well; he will eat anything and everything in sight, regardless of whether it's food or not. He often goes "Om nom nom nom nom!" whenever he is eating something, His signature song is C is for Cookie, He also started in several recurring segments where he tried to not resist on eating a cookie that has the letter of the day on it, started in several cinematic styles trailer parodies of famous movies, and even ran a food truck with Gonger from the Furchester Hotel. He also is depicted to be a chef/baker due to his love of food (especially cookies)

==== Zoe ====
- Performed by Fran Brill (1993–2015), Jennifer Barnhart (2016–present)

Zoe is an orange 3-year-old female monster who is "simultaneously dainty and strong, practical and impulsive" and is Elmo's best friend. She has a pet rock named Rocco; and loves to dance ballet.

==== Rosita ====
- Performed by Carmen Osbahr (1991–present)

Rosita is a bilingual turquoise 5-year-old female monster who speaks both English and Spanish. She also plays the guitar.

==== Grover ====
- Performed by Frank Oz (1970–2012), Eric Jacobson (1999–present)

Grover is a blue monster described by Borgenicht as "self-confident, furry, cute, capable, and intelligent", and has a superhero alter-ego named "Super Grover", who is more well-meaning than helpful.

==== Count von Count (The Count) ====
- Performed by Jerry Nelson (1972–2012), Matt Vogel (2013–present)

In addition to Ernie and Bert, recognizable humanoid Muppets appearing on the show include Count von Count, a friendly and harmless, but number-obsessed vampire based on Bela Lugosi's interpretation of Count Dracula. The Count has been confirmed to be of an Indian descent, explaining the love of numbers as his being directly related to Aryabhata.

==== Prairie Dawn ====
- Performed by Fran Brill (1971–2015), Stephanie D'Abruzzo (2016–present)

Prairie Dawn is a young girl who loves to write and direct pageants featuring her friends.

==== Elmo ====
- Performed by Kevin Clash (1985-2012), Ryan Dillon (2013-present).
- Other Performers: Various including: Jerry Nelson (Ca. 1980), Kathryn Mullen (Ca. 1980), Brian Meehl (1981-1984), Richard Hunt (1984-1985)

One Muppet monster who became a household name and main icon in the show's recent history is Elmo, a small, red monster with a falsetto voice, representing the 3-year-old child, and usually referring to himself from a third person perspective. Elmo became what his eventual performer, Kevin Clash, considered a "phenomenon" after Clash took over the role in 1984, and his popularity ultimately grew to the point where he became what writer Michael Davis called "the embodiment" of Sesame Street. Typically, he is portrayed as friendly and cheerful, he has a distinctive giggling laughter, and every so often he falls over backwards to amuse viewers, such as in the 2002 video, Elmo Visits the Firehouse (except that Maria caught him on that occasion). In 1998, the Muppet got his own segment occupying the last 15 minutes of the show, "Elmo's World", in which he explored child-centered topics from two worlds of live action and computer animation, which looked like "a child's squiggly crayon drawing come to life". "Elmo's World" continued until 2012, when it was alternated by another segment starring the character, "Elmo the Musical". Later, "Elmo's World" returned in 2017, with a new revamped version. Elmo is one of the main protagonists along with Abby Cadabby, Cookie Monster and Grover. He has two pets: a fish named Dorothy and his puppy Tango.

==== Abby Cadabby ====
- Performed by Leslie Carrara-Rudolph (2006–present)

While the rights to Muppet characters from other productions were sold to The Walt Disney Company in 2004, Sesame Workshop continued to fully own the Sesame Street Muppets; as a result, Sesame Workshop was and is allowed to have new Muppets designed and built for the show. These have included Abby Cadabby, a four-year-old pink fairy-in-training, who was introduced in 2006 to increase the number of the show's female Muppets; Her stepbrother, Rudy, was introduced to the show in the summer of 2017.

==== Julia ====
- Performed by Stacey Gordon (2017–present)

Julia is the first Muppet with autism on the show, introduced in 2017, who was created to familiarize young children with the autism spectrum. She is four years old.

==== Two-Headed Monster ====
- Left Head: Performed by Jerry Nelson (1978–2000), Joey Mazzarino (2001–2016), Eric Jacobson (2016–present)
- Right Head: Performed by Richard Hunt (1978–1992), David Rudman (1998–present)

Two-Headed Monster teaches cooperation while speaking in baby-like gibberish but with heavy accents.

==== Others ====
In addition to these regular characters, others that occasionally appear are: the Twiddlebugs, a family of cute and innovative insects; the Yip Yips, a species of Martians who "valiantly explore our world despite their frequent terrifying encounters with everyday objects"; game show host Guy Smiley; construction workers Biff and Sully; Herry Monster, a burly blue monster who does not know his own strength; Forgetful Jones, a "simpleton cowboy" with a short-term memory disorder; and even Kermit the Frog, the flagship character of The Muppets.

The Three Bears from the story of Goldilocks appear in Muppet form on Sesame Street. Telly Monster, a violet-red worrywart who overthinks everything, was described by writer David Borgenicht as "neurotic", and was originally portrayed as a television addict; Murray Monster, a dark orange monster with an energetic, outgoing personality and a sense of quick wit, who hosts a segment at the beginning of each episode called "Word on the Street".

=== Humans ===
The original human cast, chosen by Stone, consisted of four characters. The first character to be introduced to the show was Gordon Robinson, a "well-liked and respected" African-American ultimately portrayed as a science teacher; he was played by Garrett Saunders on the test pilots, by Matt Robinson in the early years of the actual series, and after being briefly played by Hal Miller, was taken over by his longest-serving portrayer, Roscoe Orman, in 1974. The other three original human characters were Gordon's wife Susan, played by Loretta Long; Mr. Harold Hooper, a "gruff grocer with [a] warm heart" portrayed by Will Lee until his death in 1982; and Bob Johnson, a music teacher played by Bob McGrath. Unlike what was done for most children's television series at the time, the producers of Sesame Street decided against using a single host and cast a group of ethnically diverse actors, with, as Sesame Street researcher Gerald S. Lesser put it, "a variety of distinctive and reliable personalities".

Stone did not audition actors until the spring of 1969, a few weeks before the show's five test pilots were due to be filmed. Stone videotaped the auditions, and researcher Ed Palmer took them out into the field to test children's reactions. The actors who received the "most enthusiastic thumbs up" were cast. For example, when the children saw Long's audition, they stood up and sang along with her rendition of "I'm a Little Teapot". As Stone said, casting was the only aspect of the show that was "just completely haphazard". Most of Sesame Street's cast and crew found their jobs through personal relationships with Stone and the other producers.

Bob's former girlfriend was Linda (Linda Bove), a librarian who communicated using American Sign Language, and who became the longest-running deaf character in television history. In 1985, Gordon and Susan adopted a shy child, Miles, who was later age-progressed into a fun-loving teenager who formed his own band. In 1971, the show introduced a Mexican-American character named Luis Rodriguez (Emilio Delgado), a repairman who has been called the "Mr. Fix-It" of Sesame Street. Luis marries Maria (Sonia Manzano) in 1988, and their daughter, Gabi, was born the following year.

When Lee died (and Mr. Hooper with him), Sesame Street dealt with his death in what Davis called a "landmark broadcast" aired on Thanksgiving Day 1983. After that, Mr. Hooper's apprentice David (Northern Calloway) took over as his store's proprietor until he himself left the show in 1989, and was succeeded by Mr. Handford (played first by Leonard Jackson and then by David Smyrl from 1990 to 1998), a former firefighter. The most recent owner of Hooper's Store is Alan, played by Alan Muraoka. Gina Jefferson (played by Alison Bartlett O'Reilly) started on the show as a teenager working at Hooper's Store, later ran a day care center, and eventually became a veterinarian. The most recently introduced human characters on Sesame Street include Chris (Chris Knowings), Gordon and Susan's nephew, who works part-time at Hooper's Store; Indian-American laundromat owner Leela (Nitya Vidyasagar); and Armando (Ismael Cruz Córdova), an energetic Latino writer and "techie [who] loves his gadgets".

Mr. Noodle, a major character in the "Elmo's World" segment, was played by Broadway actor Bill Irwin, who had previously worked with Arlene Sherman (one of the show's executive producers) in short films for Sesame Street. When he became unavailable, Sherman asked her friend Michael Jeter to replace Irwin as Mr. Noodle's brother Mr. Noodle. Jeter was in the role beginning in 2000, until his death in 2003. Kristin Chenoweth played Mr. Noodle's sister Ms. Noodle, and Sarah Jones played Mr. Noodle's other sister Miss Noodle. Writer Louise A. Gikow called the Noodles "a dynasty of mimes...in the tradition of great silent film comedians like Charlie Chaplin, Buster Keaton, and Harold Lloyd". They made mistakes, but solved them with the help of "enthusiastic kid voice-overs", which empowered children and helped them feel smarter than the adults. According to long-time Sesame Street writer Judy Freudberg, "Mr. Noodle, who never speaks, is all about trial and error. When you throw him a hat, he acts like he's never seen one before. Kids feel empowered watching him because they can do what he can't".

=== Animated characters ===
In addition to its "variety of distinctive and reliable personalities", both Muppet and human, Sesame Street has featured a few animated characters throughout its history, who have included (among others) Alice Braithwaite Goodyshoes, described by Lesser as an "arrogant, sanctimonious know-it-all", and the Teeny Little Super Guy, a typical problem solver. In 2008, Bert and Ernie got their own Claymation segment called "Bert and Ernie's Great Adventure", in which they explore the world, going on "active adventures in exotic locations", according to Sesame Street executive producer Carol-Lynn Parente. The following year, Abby Cadabby got her own computer-animated segment, "Abby's Flying Fairy School", where she takes fairy training classes from her teacher Mrs. Sparklenose, along with her classmates Gonnigan and Blögg. Additionally, several DC Comics characters were licensed for use in animated segments on the show during its first season, including Batman and Superman. Animated characters rarely if ever interact with the human and Muppet characters, with the exception of Smarty. Smarty debuted in 2017 season 47 of Elmo's World. Smarty is a sentient smartphone who can look things up in order to learn about them, and gives that information to Elmo and the audience.
