= Sesame Street... 20 Years & Still Counting =

1989 TV Special

Sesame Street... 20 Years & Still Counting is a 1989 television special celebrating the 20th anniversary of Sesame Street. Hosted by Bill Cosby, the special aired on Friday, April 7, 1989, on NBC.

This special was originally produced by The Children’s Television Workshop, in association with The Jim Henson Company (one of the few Sesame Street productions the company directly produced, though "Executive Producer for CTW" credit was included in the end credits). The special was originally intended to air as part of The Jim Henson Hour but instead ended up airing as a solo special the week before The Jim Henson Hour premiered.

In the special, comedian Bill Cosby details the history of the show while interacting with various Muppet characters. Among the subjects featured are the curriculum, the show's adult humor and the foreign co-productions from around the world (e.g. Plaza Sésamo—now Sésamo—, Iftah Ya Simsim, Sesamstrasse, Sesamstraat, and Rechov Sumsum). There are also guest-star appearances; opera singer Plácido Domingo sings with Placido Flamingo, and Ray Charles sings Kermit's version of the song "It's Not Easy Bein' Green".

Meanwhile, Bert and Ernie are filming the street with their video camera so they can watch Sesame Street on television, but Cookie Monster appears and eats both the video camera and the video tape. Bert, Ernie & Cookie Monster tell everybody on Sesame Street that they'll be sad because people don't like to watch Sesame Street anymore. Then Kermit the Frog appears in his "Sesame Street News" attire, asking various people (all of which are played by the Muppet Grover) how to get to Sesame Street, and occasionally running into people who had appeared on the show when they were kids.

The special ends with all the characters singing the Sesame Street song “Sing.” The program is dedicated to the memory of Joe Raposo, who had died on February 5, 1989, in Bronxville, New York, of non-Hodgkin lymphoma.

== Cast ==
=== Humans ===
- Emilio Delgado as Luis
- Sonia Manzano as Maria
- Bob McGrath as Bob
- Loretta Long as Susan
- Roscoe Orman as Gordon
- Miles Orman as Miles
- Linda Bove as Linda
- Bill McCutcheon as Uncle Wally
- Alison Bartlett as Gina
- Northern Calloway as David
- Jim Henson as himself

=== Jim Henson's Sesame Street Muppet Performers ===
- Caroll Spinney as Big Bird and Oscar the Grouch
- Frank Oz as Bert, Grover and Cookie Monster
- Fran Brill as Prairie Dawn
- Jerry Nelson as Count von Count and Herry Monster
- Jim Henson as Ernie and Kermit the Frog
- Kevin Clash as Elmo and Baby Natasha
- Richard Hunt as Don Music and Placido Flamingo
- Martin P. Robinson as Telly Monster and Snuffy
- Bryant Young as Snuffy (back half)
- Judy Sladky as Alice Snuffleupagus
- Fred "Garbo" Garver as Barkley
- Camille Bonora as Ruby
- Pam Arciero as Lavender Anything Muppet
- David Rudman as Swiss

Additional Muppet Performers: Noel MacNeal (uncredited)

=== Background Muppets ===
The Amazing Mumford, Frazzle, Two-Headed Monster, Gladys the Cow, Sonny Friendly, Forgetful Jones, Grundgetta, Hoots the Owl, Aretha, Anything Muppets, AM Monsters, Mr. Honker, Buster the Horse, Meryl Sheep, Chip and Dip, Kermit the Forg, Clancy, Bruce Monster, Parker Monster, Billy Monster, Max the Magnifcent, Immy, Merry Monster.

== Nielsen ratings ==
The special ranked 68th out of 80 shows that week and brought in a 7.7/14 rating/share and was watched by around 12.6 million viewers, finishing third in its timeslot behind ABC's Perfect Strangers (13.0/25, 18.6 million, 44th) and Full House (14.6/26, 21.5 million, 30th), and CBS's Beauty and the Beast (10.7/20, 15.2 million, 55th).
