= Sesame Street (fictional location) =

Fictional street

- Sesame Street location
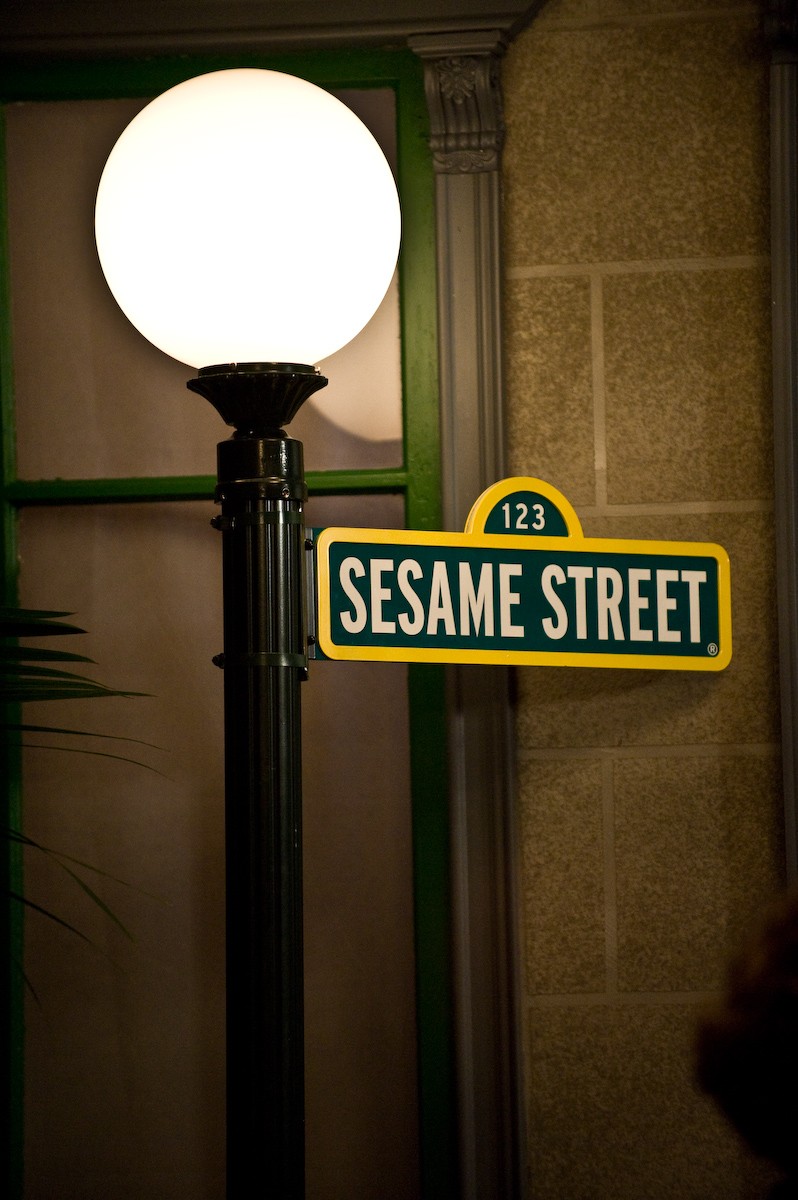
- Signpost of Sesame Street
- Created by: Joan Ganz Cooney; Lloyd Morrisett
- Genre: Childrens education

In-universe information
- Type: Street
- Races: Muppets; Humans
- Location: Manhattan, New York City
- Locations: Locations
- Character: Characters

Sesame Street is a fictional street located in Manhattan, a borough in New York City. The street serves as the location for the American children's television series of the same name, which is centered on 123 Sesame Street, a fictional brownstone building.

In honor of Sesame Street's 50th anniversary on May 1, 2019, the intersection between Broadway and West 63rd Street was officially renamed Sesame Street, and an actual sign was placed permanently at the intersection. Characters from the show joined the mayor of New York City, Bill de Blasio, for the unveiling. The location of the permanent sign and designated intersection were chosen because they are near the Sesame Workshop.

== Fictional location ==
The fictional Sesame Street represents an unspecified neighborhood in New York City. Art director Victor DiNapoli has said it is supposed to be located on the Upper West Side. Sesame Street's co-creator, Joan Ganz Cooney, said in 1994 that she originally wanted to call the show 123 Avenue B after the Alphabet City area of the Lower East Side and East Village.

The opposite side of Sesame Street is not part of the set, although the other side is occasionally shown from another location. The opposite side has been seen in the two Sesame Street movies.

The featured building and bridge in the background are composites and are to represent a broader variety of American cities. The bridge represents three bridges of New York City.

== Notable fiction locations ==
=== 123 Sesame Street ===
Sesame Street primarily revolves around a brownstone-type row house called 123 Sesame Street. The house is a three-story building with a daylight basement, totaling three known apartments.

- First floor: The Robinson family. Elmo's family moved to this floor in Season 46.
- Second floor: The Rodriguez family. Originally Maria lived there alone until she married Luis and had Gabi. Buffy would live with her when she came to stay.
- Bert and Ernie live in the basement apartment.

The building is meant to appear typical of New York neighborhood brownstones, being described as a "survivor of gentrification" by DiNapoli.

=== Oscar's trash can ===
Oscar the Grouch's trash can is his home, and sits in front of a fence made of salvaged doors. Gordon states that the trash can has three and a half bedrooms. Oscar's girlfriend Grundgetta is the most frequent visitor to his trash can.

In the episode Sesame Street Visits the Firehouse, Gordon mentions that Oscar's trash can has "Two elephants, a puppy, a rhino, a goat, and a worm." The interior of Oscar's trash can was first explored in the 1999 film The Adventures of Elmo in Grouchland when Elmo impatiently enters the trash can in search of his blanket. In Season 46, as part of a set redesign, the trash can is moved to a dumpster unit of the front of 123 Sesame Street. It is now part of a recycling center with a compost bin and Oscar can appear at different locations throughout the street.

=== Big Bird's nest ===
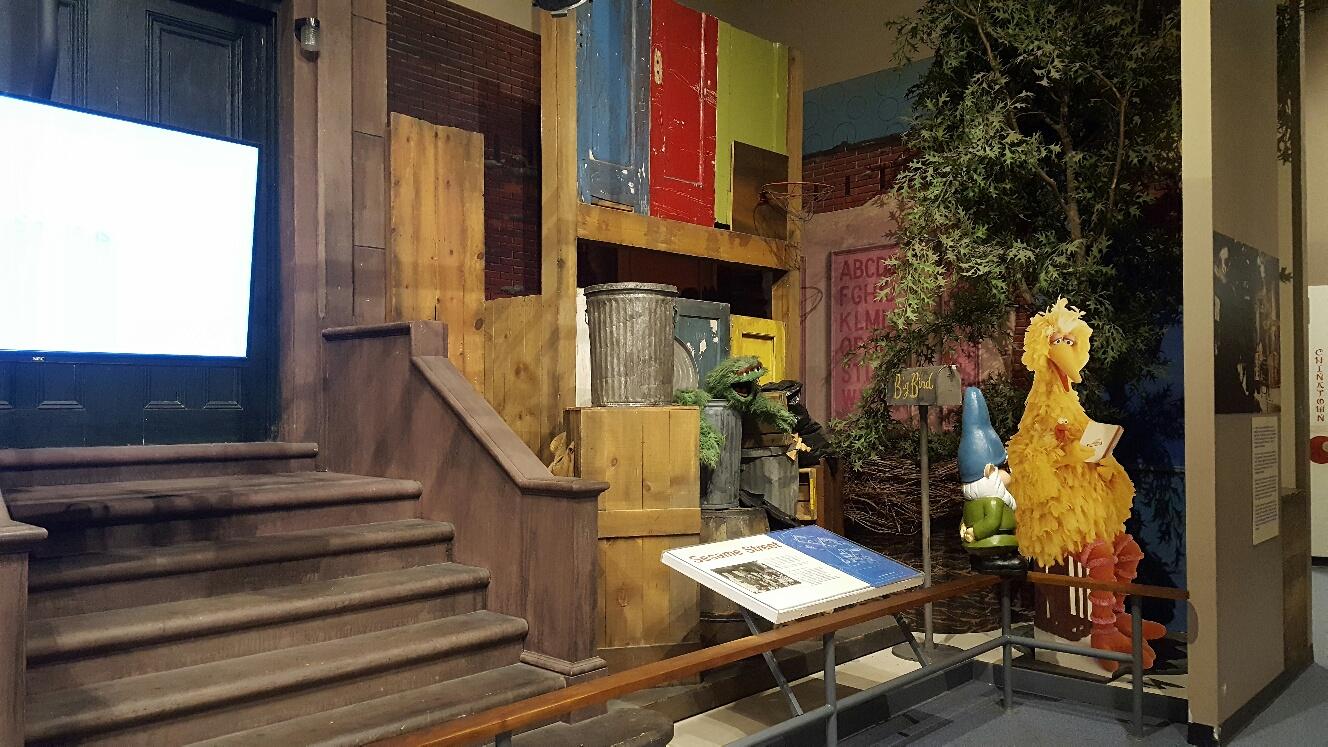
Big Bird on Sesame Street

Big Bird lives in his nest. One of the windows of Gordon and Susan's apartment overlooks the nest. Big Bird's Nest was redesigned following a hurricane that hit Sesame Street. Big Bird's best friend Mr. Snuffleupagus is the most frequent visitor to his nest. In Season 46, the nest was moved to a tree.

=== The Arbor ===
The Arbor is a forecourt that serves as the entrance to a carriage house; it is also a playground, and separates 123 from a tenement. In the first season, the Arbor was a tiny location between the two buildings. In the late 1990s, the characters decided that the neighborhood needed more green space and built a community garden in a vacant lot behind the Arbor. The garden behind the Arbor is where Stinky the Stinkweed resides.

At one time, the carriage house that serves as its backdrop housed a garage. Susan kept her Volkswagen there and Hiroshi used the space as his art studio. At other points, Oscar the Grouch (who has also been shown as the owner of the garage) has kept his Sloppy Jalopy there. The Sloppy Jalopy is the name of the car Oscar uses for his taxi service, which was first introduced on the show in episode 1252. For a while, it was also the location of Gina's veterinary practice, and later Charlie's Auto Repair garage. During the Season 46 set redesign, it was converted to a community center with the community garden being extended behind 123, connecting onto Big Bird's nest area while becoming Abby Cadabby's home.

=== Hooper's Store ===
Hooper's Store serves as a lunch counter and general store. Above the store were the apartments of Bob, David, and most recently, Charlie.

Hooper's Store was opened by Mr. Harold Hooper in 1951. David worked at the store from 1971 to 1983, becoming the proprietor of Hooper's Store following the death of Mr. Hooper (due to the death of actor Will Lee).

In 1989, David moved away to live with his grandmother and left the store in the hands of a retired firefighter named Mr. Handford. The store's current proprietor is Alan who bought the store from Mr. Handford in 1998.

Owners

- Mr. Hooper (1951–1982)
- David (1982–1989)
- Mr. Handford (1989–1998)
- Alan (1998–present)

Employees

- Tom (1970–1972)
- David (1972–1982)
- Piri (1984–1986)
- Gina (1987–1995)
- Carlo (1995–1998)
- Gabi (2004)
- Miles (2006)
- Chris (2007–present)

=== The Sesame Street Library ===
The Sesame Street Library is a common point of interest on Sesame Street. A Lending Library was located next to Hooper's Store in the spot that has since housed the Fix-It Shop, the Mail-It Shop, the Laundromat, and a pet shop. Maria worked there while Grover would occasionally help out. All the residents of Sesame Street would come to borrow books. Linda worked as a librarian for several years in a different library that has, at different times, been located across the street from 123 as well as in another part of New York City. The library was later seen located next to the Subway Station where the bike shop is now (in a 2007 episode), and as a pop-up library in The Arbor featured in an episode that aired in 2019.

=== The Fix-It Shop ===
The Fix-It Shop opened in Season 3 as the L & R Fix-It Shop run by Luis and Rafael. Rafael departed at the end of the season and Luis ran the business by himself until he hired Maria in 1976. Maria was later promoted to full-time partner in 1981 and in 1988 the two got married. The street's residents would bring their broken items to be fixed; toasters were the shop's specialty.

==== Mail-It Shop ====
In 2002, Maria and Luis converted the Fix-It Shop into the Mail-It Shop which they ran with their daughter Gabi. Residents of Sesame Street would use the Mail-It Shop to send and receive letters and packages. Grover occasionally did delivery work for the Mail-It Shop. It was converted back into the Fix-It Shop in 2006.

=== Laundromat ===
The Laundromat is the current business operating next to Hooper's Store after the Fix-It Shop was removed in 2008. Beginning with Season 39 of Sesame Street, the laundromat has been moved next to Hooper's Store. The Laundromat was originally run by Leela and has since been seen in the care of Nina and Grover among others.

Previously, in The Adventures of Elmo in Grouchland, a Laundromat was seen across from 123 Sesame Street.

=== Subway Station ===
Sesame Street has its own Subway Station, which is a replica of the 72nd Street Subway entrance. It was originally seen on the "Around the Corner" part of Sesame Street until it was transferred to the main Sesame Street set, next to the Fix-It Shop, when Around the Corner was removed.

=== Bicycle Shop ===
In Season 45, a Bicycle Shop appeared in the vacant storefront near the Subway Station that was briefly used for a flower shop. It was opened by Luis who sold bicycles, repaired them, and sold other bike-related items. It was opened as a result of the closure of the Fix-It Shop, while Maria became the superintendent of 123. It is now run by Nina who started working there part-time in Season 46 and took over management in the following season. As part of the rare views of the other side of Sesame Street, the Bicycle Shop is next to a CGI depiction of Manhattan where it shows a playground and the Triborough Bridge among the cityscape.

=== Newsstand ===
In Season 46, a newsstand was added in between the Subway Station and what is currently the Laundromat. It is run by the Two-Headed Monster. There previously was a newsstand Around the Corner that was run by Oscar. It was located in between the Subway Station and the park. Grouch sold newspapers, regular newspapers, out-of-date newspapers, and magazines with dirt or fish inside them. Hooper's Store has also functioned as a Newsstand.

== Other locations in the neighborhood ==
Other locations on Sesame Street include the following:

- Mr. MacIntosh's Fruit Cart - Mr. MacIntosh, played by Sesame Street's floor manager. He had a fruit cart and roamed the street selling a wide variety of fruits from around Season 3 to the late 1980s.
- Willy's Hot Dog Stand - A rolling hot dog stand that Willy operated from the early 1970s to the late 1980s.

== Around the Corner ==
Around the Corner was an expansion of the set seen from season 25 to season 29.

Sonia Manzano said that "By expanding the street and going around the corner, we will have other places to hang out beyond the stoop of 123 Sesame Street, and we will be able to explore family issues which we think are so important to kids today."

The Around the Corner parts were dropped by season 29, though they did appear in The Adventures of Elmo in Grouchland. Caroll Spinney and Martin P. Robinson further commented that viewers had a hard time keeping up with all the new characters.

Among the known locations of Around the Corner include:

- 10 Sesame Street - A two-story brick building that adjoins the Subway Station.
  - Finders Keepers - A second-hand store operated by Ruthie on the first floor of the building. It contains items that were previously owned by fairy tales and nursery rhyme characters. Despite her shop being removed from the show, Ruthie continued to appear, often in inserts, up until Season 32.
  - Celina's Dance Studio - A dance studio owned by Celina that is on the second floor of 10 Sesame Street. The second floor also featured office space, but this was the only known business shown to be located there. Elements of the building still feature on the set today.
- 456 Sesame Street - A brownstone house, which was first referenced in The Sesame Street Treasury. It was the home of Betty Lou (as revealed in Volume 5) and Herry Monster (as revealed in Volume 9). It has also been the address of many characters including Count von Count's castle, Mr. Snuffleupagus's cave, and the building that currently houses Hooper's Store and the Laundromat. It was home to Angela, Jamal, and their baby daughter Kayla. Angela ran a Daycare Center in her apartment. After she left, Gina moved in and ran a daycare on the first floor.
- Birdland - A jazz club owned by Hoots the Owl who often introduced its acts. It was located below The Furry Arms Hotel with the entrance located in the alleyway between the hotel and 10 Sesame Street. Before 1993, only the exterior of the club could be seen on the show. Birdland is based on a real jazz club by the same name. It was inspired by famed musician Charlie Parker, whose nickname was "Bird" and who served as the headliner for the club.
- Furry Arms Hotel - A Muppet Hotel owned by Sherry Netherland with both her employees Humphrey and Ingrid (who work as the hotel managers), Benny Rabbit (who works as a bellhop), Otis the Elephant (an earlier version of Horatio the Elephant who works as an elevator operator), Ernestine the Telephone Operator, and Dinger (who works as the call bell). It is located next to 456 Sesame Street. The Furry Arms Hotel was one of the few exterior street sets specifically built to puppet scale rather than to accommodate both puppets and human cast members (although human guests occasionally appeared inside). As a result, in Episode 3139 when Gordon and Susan chose to spend the night at the Furry Arms Hotel while their apartment was getting painted, they had to bend over when they went through the revolving door and also had trouble getting their suitcase through that same door. The Furry Arms Hotel also houses an indoor swimming pool and a lounge. It continued to be seen in inserts up to around Season 31.
- The Park - The Park contains a playground and some trees (one of them is the home of the Squirrels). In the video The Best of Elmo, the Park was shown to be located across from the Furry Arms Hotel. A park that may or may not be the same as the one located across the street was seen in later episodes.
