= Christmas Eve on Sesame Street =

- Oscar the Grouch (in his trash can) and Big Bird at the 86th Street station
- Genre: Comedy; Family; Music
- Based on: Sesame Street by Joan Ganz Cooney; Lloyd Morrisett Muppet characters by Jim Henson
- Written by: Jon Stone; Joseph A. Bailey
- Directed by: Jon Stone
- Starring: Caroll Spinney; Frank Oz; Jerry Nelson; Richard Hunt; Jim Henson
- Music by: Dick Lieb
- Country of origin: United States
- Original language: English

Production
- Executive producers: Jon Stone; Jim Henson (uncredited)
- Producer: Dulcy Singer
- Production location: New York City
- Cinematography: Charles F. Wheeler (director of photography) (uncredited)
- Editors: Vincent Sims (videotape editor); John Hutchison (videotape editor)
- Running time: 60 minutes
- Production company: Children's Television Workshop

Original release
- Network: PBS
- Release: December 3, 1978

Christmas Eve on Sesame Street is a Sesame Street Christmas special first broadcast on PBS on Sunday, December 3, 1978.

== Plot ==
The special starts with live-action versions of the Muppets enjoying an ice skating party. Afterward, they head home to Sesame Street performing the song "True Blue Miracle".

In the main story, Oscar the Grouch plants the seeds of doubt in Big Bird's mind whether Santa Claus can actually get down chimneys to deliver Christmas presents. Big Bird enlists the help of Kermit the Frog and Grover to interview children about how he manages it; their responses vary. Big Bird even attempts a reenactment with Snuffy but it is unsuccessful. He spends the night out in the cold on the brownstone's roof, waiting for Santa to appear in person. After the residents of Sesame Street realize that Big Bird has gone missing, Maria confronts Oscar for upsetting Big Bird. Oscar reveals that he was only teasing Big Bird and agrees to help search for him.

Meanwhile, in a variation on the 1905 O. Henry story "The Gift of the Magi", Bert and Ernie want to give each other Christmas presents, but they have no money. Bert trades away his prized paper clip collection to buy a pink soap dish for Ernie's Rubber Duckie, but Ernie has bartered it to get Bert an empty cigar box for his paper clip collection. Mr. Hooper, the store owner, realizes what is happening and gives them their treasured possessions back as Christmas presents.

Also, Cookie Monster attempts to get in touch with Santa Claus to bring him cookies for Christmas. In confusion, he ends up violently eating a pencil, a typewriter to type a letter and a telephone to call the North Pole. At Gordon and Susan Robinson's apartment, he laments to Gordon that he was unable to contact Santa. Gordon suggests leaving cookies for Santa, leaving him perplexed.

In the end, Big Bird walks down from the roof to warm up, much to the relief of his friends. He realizes Santa Claus had already come and gone when he sees the presents under the tree (due to him falling asleep on the roof and Santa's shadow looms over him while he's asleep). He regrets not learning how Santa can go down chimneys, but he comes to recognize that being together with family and friends is more important. Oscar, true to form, starts needling him about how the Easter Bunny can hide all the eggs in one night, only to be rebuked by Gordon and Susan as Big Bird begins to fret about the holidays all over again. Big Bird goes outside to hug David, Maria, Bob, Linda, Mr. Hooper, Susan, and the kids. He also waves to Ernie and Bert who watch from their apartment. Gordon and Olivia put Oscar and his trash can back in its spot.

The special concludes with Susan and Gordon returning to their apartment to find that Cookie Monster has eaten the needles and decorations off their Christmas tree.

== Cast ==
=== Puppeteers ===
- Caroll Spinney as Big Bird and Oscar the Grouch
- Jim Henson as Kermit the Frog and Ernie
- Frank Oz as Grover, Bert and Cookie Monster
- Jerry Nelson as The Count and Snuffy
- Richard Hunt as Oscar the Grouch (assistant), Cookie Monster (assistant), Ernie (assistant) and Snuffy (assistant)

=== The cast of Sesame Street ===
- Linda Bove as Linda
- Northern Calloway as David
- Debbie Chen as Patty
- Will Lee as Mr. Hooper
- Loretta Long as Susan Robinson
- Sonia Manzano as Maria
- Bob McGrath as Bob Johnson
- Roscoe Orman as Gordon Robinson
- Alaina Reed as Olivia Robinson
- Danny Epstein as the Street Musician
- Chet O'Brien as Mr. Macintosh
- Jon Stone as the Voice of Santa Claus over Cookie Monster's telephone

== Credits ==
- Producer: Dulcy Singer
- Written by Jon Stone and Joseph A. Bailey
- Skaters from Holiday on Ice
  - "True Blue Miracle" by Carol Hall
  - "Keep Christmas with You" and "I Hate Christmas" by Sam Pottle and David Axelrod
- Original Music Arranger and Conductor: Dick Lieb
- Music Coordinator: Danny Epstein
- Music Assistant: Dave Connor
- Associate Director: Ozzie Alfonso
- Production Supervisor: Robert Braithwaite
- Muppets by: Donald Sahlin, Kermit Love, Caroly Wilcox, John Lovelady
- Art Director: Alan J. Compton
- Production Stage Manager: Chet O'Brien
- Stage Manager: Emily Squires
- Set Decorator: Nat Mongioi
- Lighting Directors: David M. Clark, Tony DiGirolamo
- Graphic Artist: Gerri Brioso
- Costume Designer: Bill Kellard
- Wardrobe: Grisha Mynova
- Production Assistants: Mercedes Polanco, Sharen Gay, Cathi Rosenberg
- Technical Advisor: Walt Rauffer
- Technical Director: Ralph Mensch
- Sound Effects: Dick Maitland, Roy Carch
- Audio: Mike Shoskes, Jay Judell
- Executive Producer: Jon Stone
- Production Conceived and Directed by: Jon Stone

== Songs ==
A variety of Christmas songs help interweave these three plot lines and make the production much more touching, including:

- "Feliz Navidad", by José Feliciano while Big Bird skates with one of the children (preceded and followed by a slow orchestral version of the song).
- "True Blue Miracle", sung during the gang's trip from the ice rink back to Sesame Street.
- "Keep Christmas with You (All Through the Year)", sung in Bob's apartment with Linda leading a group of children in signing the chorus.
- "I Hate Christmas", sung by Oscar the Grouch outside on Sesame Street.
- "Have Yourself a Merry Little Christmas", sung by Bert and Ernie after opening their Christmas presents to each other.
- "Keep Christmas with You (All Through the Year)" (Reprise), sung by everyone at the end.

== Awards ==
- 1979: Emmy Award for Outstanding Children's Program - Jon Stone (executive producer), Dulcy Singer (producer)

One of the special's competitors that year was a lesser-known, critically panned Sesame Street special on CBS -- A Special Sesame Street Christmas.

In 1988, the production was converted to a live show and performed on ice for a single show in Philadelphia, PA.

== Edits ==
In various re-airings on PBS in the late 1980s the closing scene with Susan and Gordon finding that Cookie Monster ate the needles and decorations off their Christmas tree was cut, likely due to a combination of the PBS closing credits at the end of the original and for Cookie Monster's excessive belching.

On video releases since the mid-1990s, the 1978 Children's Television Workshop logo with Christmas music was cut. The 1996 VHS replaces it with the 1983 logo, and DVD releases of the special start without any logos.

In December 2020, the special was released on the HBO Max streaming service. Approximately 2 minutes of Big Bird skating to Jose Feliciano’s recording of "Feliz Navidad" was removed. The closing scene featuring Cookie Monster, Susan, and Gordon is present on Max as of December 2023.

When Big Bird and Patty check on Oscar following his skating accident, his original line was "Sure. I've been thrown out of better places than that." It was later re-dubbed in post-production (to "Let's go back and do it, again!"), because Jon Stone considered the original joke too adult-focused.

== Home media ==
The special was released on VHS in 1987 and 1996, and on DVD in 2002 and 2008. As of 2023 the show is also available for streaming on Amazon Prime.

== Recording ==
The soundtrack album features several of the songs from the special, along with narration. It was nominated for a Grammy Award, but lost to In Harmony: A Sesame Street Record.

== See also ==
- List of American films of 1978
- List of Christmas television specials
- List of Christmas films
