= Hooper's Store =

Fictional business on Sesame Street

Hooper's Store is a fictional business and meeting-place on the television show Sesame Street. When the show began, the store was one of the four main locations on the set representing the fictional Sesame Street, with the 123 Sesame Street brownstone, the Fix-It Shop, and the carriage house. In the show, the original owner was Mr. Hooper, a gruff but friendly grocer.

After the death in 1982 of Will Lee, the actor who played Mr. Hooper, the store was managed by other characters, including David, Mr. Handford, and Alan.

== History ==
Original proprietor Mr. Hooper (Will Lee) and his store in its earlier days as a candy shop/soda fountain/general store

The fictional store was said to be founded by Mr. Harold Hooper in 1951 as a general store. In canon, the food menu was extensive and suited to the different characters that lived on Sesame Street, a fictional Manhattan street. Along with traditional American diner-type food, the store sold a wide range of goods from dry goods to soap dishes and stranger goods such as empty cigar boxes (in Christmas Eve on Sesame Street) and birdseed milkshakes for Big Bird.

In Street Gang: The Complete History of Sesame Street, Michael Davis notes that the store was one of the early core concepts that producer Jon Stone brought to the show:

There would be an older proprietor of a neighborhood variety store, the type that had a soda fountain with pedestal stools. At that time in Bronx sociological history, the owner of such a business would likely have been male, Caucasian, and Jewish. Stone asked Rosen to build into the set what ultimately became Hooper's Store. "It gave us a wonderful location both for comedy and curriculum-driven bits," Stone said.

Over the course of the show, the store often acts as a gathering spot for the characters. In Sesame Street Unpaved, David Borgenicht writes:

Hooper's Store is what all good communities and neighborhoods require -- a gathering place. Hooper's Store is to Sesame Street what Cheers was to Cheers, what the Pirate's Cove was to The Love Boat, what Arnold's was to Happy Days: a place where Muppets and humans alike could go to get whatever they needed, whether that be a Figgy Fizz soda or a chocolate egg cream (Hooper's specialty).

== David ==
The fictional character David (Northern Calloway), a young African-American who moved to Sesame Street in the early 1970s, was soon hired by Mr. Hooper as an assistant. David was originally conceived as a hip, upbeat singer fresh out of high school who was fond of eccentric hats. Although he appeared in Season 3, he began working at the store in Season 4 while studying law at college.

Upon Mr. Hooper's death, which correlated with the death of his actor, Will Lee, in real life, the store was left to David in-universe. During seasons 16 and 17, a teenaged boy named Piri (played by Eddie Castrodad) worked at the store. Following this, David hired a new resident of the area, Gina (played by Alison Bartlett-O'Reilly) in 1987. This young teenage girl helped David as he himself had helped Mr. Hooper.

Bert was hired to help David in one Sesame Street book. During his employment he accidentally broke a teapot given to David by Mr. Hooper, but was forgiven for the mistake.

Actor Calloway faced health issues in 1989, and left the series. His character moved to a farm, to live with his grandmother. The actor died in 1990.

David's final appearance was the season finale of Season 20 (the birth of Maria and Luis' daughter). Gina continued to work at the store for a couple of years after it was bought out by Mr. Handford. In 1995, she got a new job at the local daycare, until she finished college and remained on the show as a veterinarian.

== Mr. Handford ==
The enthusiastic Mr. Handford was a new character brought to the show exclusively to run the store, a change from the previous management of David, who started out as a character before he became the store operator. This African-American man was a retired firefighter who bought the store to keep active. Gina continued to work in the store with Mr. Handford as her new boss.

Although Leonard Jackson played him in Season 21, he was then recast and David Smyrl took over the role. While Jackson portrayed Mr. Handford as something of a “grumpy old man” with little patience for his friends’ quirks, Smyrl made the character much more cheerful, friendly, and quite young at heart.

In 1991, Hooper's Store was beginning to fall into disrepair. The final nail in the coffin came when Sully and Biff tried to hang up a picture frame for Mr. Handford, but Biff's misplaced hammer swing caused the entire woodwork of the store to collapse. No one was hurt, but the store was ruined, and Mr. Handford considered closing the store for good. Everyone convinced him that they needed him, and the store, so they all pitched in to rebuild it. The construction brought minor, cosmetic changes to the store, most notably a back door accessing the basement and kitchen.

A Hispanic-American teenager named Carlo (played by Carlo Alban) first appeared in 1993 as one of Gordon's students. In 1995, he was hired to work at the store.

These characters ran the store until 1998 when the actors left the show. There was no on-screen explanation to the characters' departures, though it has been stated in canon that Mr. Handford had retired, and sold the store to Alan (played by Alan Muraoka) that year.

== Alan ==
Alan Muraoka joined the cast in 1998, as Alan, the new store owner. Muraoka has commented that his casting was atypical for the role, as most of the previous owners "were older and more grandfather-ish."

In season 35, Natalie was hired by Alan as a replacement while he took a vacation. Big Bird and Baby Bear are initially very anxious of the big change, but Natalie gradually assures them things will be fine. Natalie was played by guest star Natalie Portman. Portman was set to star as Natalie in three episodes in the 2004 season, but due to her losing her voice, Sesame Workshop had to film the other two episodes with Gabi in charge.

In Season 38, Chris Robinson joined Alan in running Mr. Hooper's Store. Chris is played by Chris Knowings, and is the nephew of Gordon and Susan.

A 2009 article about the series described the store as becoming a bodega.

== In themed entertainment ==
Various Sesame Place theme parks have featured the store. Originally at the Pennsylvania location, Mr. Hooper's Store was part of a play area.

Japan's Sesame Place included Mr. Hooper's Store, a gift shop.

For the 50th anniversary of the series, in 2019, an Australian pop-up exhibition of Sesame Street named its gift shop "Hooper's Store."
