= Welcome to Holland =

1987 essay by Emily Perl Kingsley

"Welcome to Holland" is a prominent essay, written in 1987 by American author and social activist Emily Perl Kingsley, about having a child with a disability. The piece is given by many organizations to new parents of children with special needs issues such as Down syndrome. As a testament to its popularity, several individuals have received the first name "Holland".

Emily Kingsley is the mother of Jason Kingsley. The younger Kingsley is an actor who has appeared on programs such as Sesame Street and enjoyed a varied career, despite the family being told early in his childhood that his struggles would prevent him from having a meaningful life. "Welcome to Holland", written in the second person, employs a metaphor of excitement for a vacation to Italy that first becomes disappointment when the plane lands instead in Holland and then contentment at the happy events which they experience instead.

== Background and contents ==
"Holland?!?" you say. "What do you mean Holland?? I signed up for Italy! I'm supposed to be in Italy. All my life I've dreamed of going to Italy.

The metaphor is that the trip to Italy is a typical birth and child-raising experience, and that the trip to Holland is the experiencing of having and raising a child with special needs.

But everyone you know is busy coming and going from Italy... and they're all bragging about what a wonderful time they had there. And for the rest of your life, you will say "Yes, that's where I was supposed to go. That's what I had planned.

In the end, however, the reader sees that the "trip" is still well worth it:

But... if you spend your life mourning the fact that you didn't get to Italy, you may never be free to enjoy the very special, the very lovely things ... about Holland.

Author and social activist Emily Perl Kingsley wrote the piece based on her experiences with her son, Jason Kingsley, and her changing beliefs through parenthood. The younger Kingsley was born in 1974 with Down syndrome. Their doctor labeled the child as a "mongoloid" that would fail to learn to speak or walk and instructed the parents to act essentially as if the birth hadn't happened, with the mother sent to receive tranquilizing drugs preventing lactation. She recounted that she cried for several days straight.

Although such medical attitudes were consistent with the prejudices of the time, the distraught family resisted and determined to provide the boy with as intellectually stimulating an environment as possible. Accounts of widespread abuse as a result of controversial institutionalization policies served to spur them on even more. The younger Kingsley has worked as an actor, appearing on programs such as Sesame Street, and otherwise enjoyed a varied career despite various challenges.

== Responses and influence ==
As a testament to its popularity, several individuals have received the first name "Holland". In 2004, Will Livingston wrote a song loosely based on the story. He also used the title "Welcome to Holland".

Critical analysis of the work and its influence has compared it to poet Robert Frost's piece The Road Not Taken, which also discusses the human tendency to look back and fret about 'what might have been' after people make decisions.

A response essay describing the possible toll that parenting can take on a family's welfare, such as raising children with severe autism, was created titled "Welcome to Beirut", with the later piece alluding to the suffering from the Lebanese Civil War. Because it encourages parents to accept their circumstances and optimistically regard the outcome as equally good, some do not feel like it resonates with their unmet expectations about parenthood or the problems their families experience.

"Welcome to Holland" has also attracted some amused, humorous responses from individuals living in both Holland and Italy in contrast to the original story's American perspective.

== See also ==
- Emily Perl Kingsley
- The Road Not Taken
