= Tarah Lynne Schaeffer =

American actress

Tarah Schaeffer
- Born: Tarah Lynne Schaeffer; July 4, 1984 (age 42)
- Occupation: Actress
- Years active: 1993–2001

Tarah Lynne Schaeffer (born July 4, 1984) is a former American child actress. She is known for her role as herself on Sesame Street.

== Acting career ==
In 1993, Sesame Street was casting for a child actor to play a character with disabilities for at least five episodes. Schaeffer's wheelchair sports coach recommended that she audition. Schaeffer had been on the Newington Children's Hospital's award-winning Cruisers wheelchair athletic team, and she impressed the show's producers with her wheelchair racing skills and other modified track and field talents. Schaeffer was cast as the first Sesame Street cast member with disabilities.

Sesame Street writer Emily Perl Kingsley was a strong supporter of Schaeffer's inclusion in the cast. Kingsley's episode "Tarah's Ballet", which features a wheelchair dance, gained her a Grand EDI. Kingsley also drafted many guests with disabilities, such as Itzhak Perlman and the Little Theater of the Deaf. The integration of Schaeffer exemplified Kingsley's views:

We include kids with disabilities just as part of the gang. Children in the audience get validation when they see others like themselves. Their siblings receive gratifying reinforcement seeing kids like those in their own families. We take the strangeness out of it. Why should difference be equated with fear?"

— Emily Perl Kingsley

I had some bumps in my road and frustrations that I'd rather not have had, but they've all got me to where I wanted to be. I know I was lucky to have the parents I did I wouldn't be here without all the support they've given me...I still hope people can look at me if they have goals and say. "If she can do it, I can do it, too."

— Tarah Schaeffer

Schaeffer appeared on Sesame Street for eight seasons. She became featured in the scripts more and more, and at times would travel two or three times a week from Connecticut to the studio in New York City. When her family moved to Reading, Pennsylvania in the late 1990s, the trip to New York became more difficult, and both Tarah and her family felt it was time to move on.

Sesame Street gave Tarah a lot of self-confidence, and we approached it as a family adventure as we did everything...We would do it as long as it was fun, and when it wasn't fun anymore that would be it.

— –cott G. Schaeffer (father)

A 2000 Sesame Workshop newsletter mentioned Tarah's inclusion in the cast as one of the top ten significant ways Sesame Street has encouraged diversity:

1994 - Tarah Lynne Schaeffer joins the cast. Wheelchair-bound [sic] Tarah proves over and over again that all kids like to play, laugh, learn, and have fun! Her spunky presence has helped children learn about the needs (and strengths!) of children with disabilities.

— Sesame Workshop Newsletter

== Personal life ==
Schaeffer was raised in Plainville, Connecticut. She was born with osteogenesis imperfecta.

== Filmography ==
- Sesame Street Stays Up Late! (1993) (uncredited)
- Sesame Street: Elmocize (1996)
- Kids' Guide to Life: Learning to Share (1996)
- Sesame Street (1993–2001)
