= Northern Calloway =

American actor

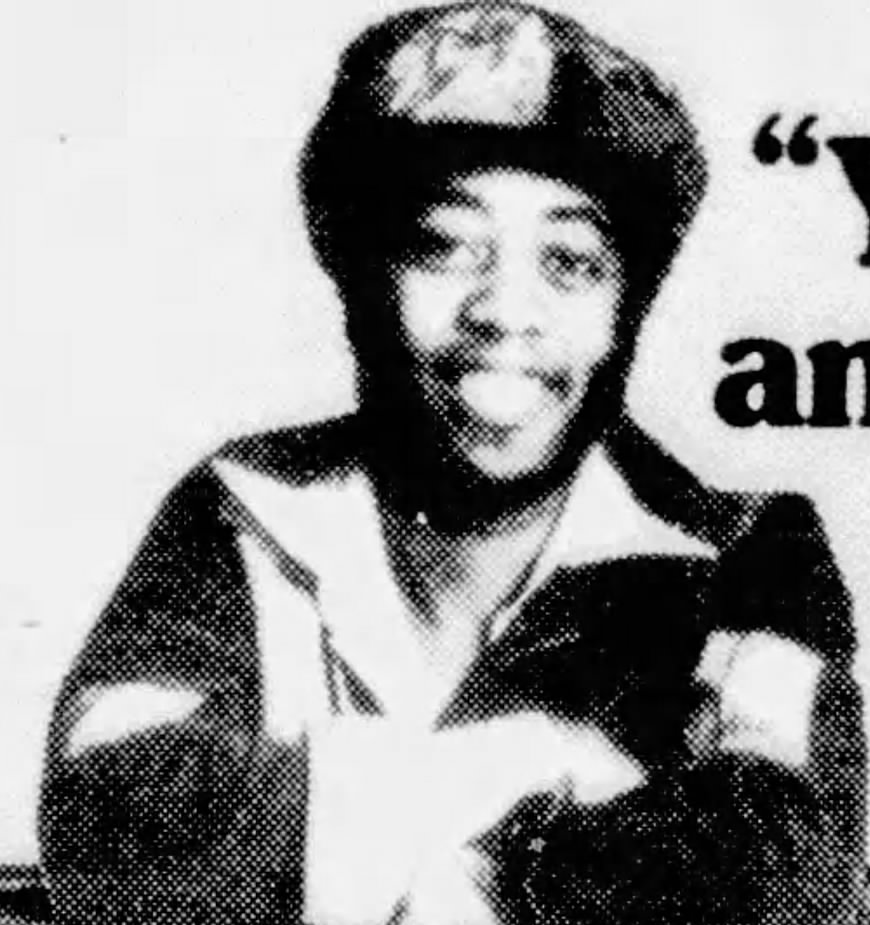
- Calloway c. 1977
- Born: Northern James Calloway; September 10, 1948; New York City, U.S.
- Died: January 9, 1990 (aged 41); North Tarrytown, New York, U.S.
- Resting place: Ferncliff Cemetery
- Occupations: Actor; singer
- Years active: 1966–1989
- Spouse: Terri Calloway (divorced)

Northern James Calloway (September 10, 1948 – January 9, 1990) was an American actor and singer who played David on Sesame Street from 1971 to 1989. He was institutionalized in a psychiatric hospital and died less than eight months after his last appearance on the show.

== Career ==
=== Theatre ===
Calloway graduated from New York City's High School of Performing Arts and joined the Lincoln Center Repertory Company in 1966. There, he performed in A Midsummer Night's Dream (Stratford Festival, 1968) and The Three Musketeers (Stratford Festival, 1968). He played the lead in the New Federal Theater production of The Louis Armstrong Story.

He became a Broadway stage actor in 1968 appearing in Tiger at the Gates (Broadway, 1968) and The Me Nobody Knows (Broadway, 1970). He continued to act in stage productions in between filming a television series, performing in Pippin (Leading Player, Her Majesty's Theatre, London, 1973), Pippin (Leading Player, Broadway, 1976), and Whose Life Is It Anyway? (Broadway, 1980). Calloway performed in six productions on Broadway from 1968 to 1980.

=== Television ===
In 1971, he joined the cast of Sesame Street during the show's second season as the character David Robinson, boyfriend of the character Maria Rodriguez (portrayed by Sonia Manzano). In 1982, after the death of fellow castmate and actor Will Lee, who was widely known for his portrayal of shopkeeper Mr. Hooper, the series decided to include his death in the show and have Calloway's character David become the new owner of Mr. Hooper's Store. He remained one of the few human characters in the series for eighteen years, appearing in 1,268 episodes.

Calloway appeared in several made-for-television movies and specials by the Children's Television Workshop for over eleven years, including Christmas Eve on Sesame Street (1978), A Special Sesame Street Christmas (1978), Don't Eat the Pictures (1983), and Put Down the Duckie (1988). In 1989, Calloway was dismissed from the series for medical reasons. Viewers were told that his character had moved away to help his grandmother on the farm and thus would no longer appear on Sesame Street. Calloway also voiced the Muppet characters the Hipster, modeled after James Brown; Baby Breeze; and the Sesame Street character Same Sound Brown.

== Legal troubles, health problems and final years on Sesame Street ==
On the morning of September 19, 1980, Calloway was arrested in Nashville, Tennessee. He had been a guest in Mary Stagaman's home, the marketing director of the Tennessee Performing Arts Center, after performing there six days earlier. After Stagaman asked him to leave the house, Calloway refused and attacked her with an iron, inflicting serious head and rib injuries. Calloway then fled into the suburbs of Nashville, where he smashed a plate glass window and storm door at one house and did extensive damage to the interior of another, destroying the family's collection of fine crystal, smashing a television set, and breaking light bulbs with his bare hands. He also stole a backpack from a first grader, smashed a windshield with a rock and stole a bag of herbicide from elderly resident Douglas Wright. Calloway spilled the herbicide on his body and was rolling on the ground and running around, at which point Wright attempted to hold Calloway at gunpoint and fired a warning shot at him, causing Calloway to dive to the ground and scream that he had been shot. He then jumped up and washed his hands and face in the Wrights' birdbath before fleeing the scene. Witnesses described him wearing nothing but a Superman T-shirt. He was arrested after hiding out in a couple's garage, screaming, "Help! I'm David from Sesame Street and they're trying to kill me!"

In his authorized history Street Gang: The Complete History of Sesame Street, author Michael Davis writes that Calloway's final years on the show were marked by periods of deteriorating health and ability punctuated by episodes of erratic behavior. During these years, he cites that Calloway reportedly bit music coordinator Danny Epstein during an on-set fight. Davis also states Calloway once appeared unannounced at Alison Bartlett's ("Gina" on Sesame) high school and proposed to her, despite his being 23 years her senior. Calloway's fellow cast members observed subtle clues to his erratic behavior and increasingly kept their distance. In addition, his criminal record caused him to be banned from Canada, where Follow That Bird was filmed; he is absent from the film.

By 1987, executive producer Dulcy Singer became increasingly doubtful about Calloway's future with the show. As a result, the writers gradually ended the relationship that the character of David had with Maria, which had been in the storyline for several years (Maria soon began a romance with Luis Rodriguez [Emilio Delgado], which resulted in their marriage in May 1988). In the episode of Maria and Luis's wedding, David can be seen and heard how disappointed and sad he was that Maria was marrying Luis instead of him. Eventually, in the spring of 1989, Singer dismissed Calloway from Sesame Street following the aforementioned incident with music coordinator Danny Epstein. His final appearance was in the 20th-season finale, which aired on May 12, 1989. In the following season, it was explained that David went to live with his grandmother on her farm in a rural part of New York to take care of her, as ownership of Hooper's Store was turned over to the character of Mr. Handford, played first by Leonard Jackson and later David Smyrl.

== Mental health and death ==
Shortly after his termination from Sesame Street, Calloway was admitted to Stony Lodge Hospital in Ossining, New York, where he received treatment for bipolar disorder.

On January 9, 1990, a violent altercation between Calloway and a staff physician took place. Calloway was subsequently taken to Phelps Memorial Hospital in North Tarrytown and pronounced dead. A coroner's report listed Calloway's official cause of death as exhaustive psychosis, now more commonly called excited delirium syndrome (EDS), a controversial condition often applied posthumously to individuals who die under restraint in custody.

Prior to his death, Calloway's marriage to Terri Calloway had ended in divorce. At the time of his death, his mother, Bunnetta Calloway, his brother, Gregory Calloway, both of Manhattan, and his sister, Connie Calloway Jackson, of Baltimore, Maryland, were still alive. He was buried in Ferncliff Cemetery.

== Discography ==
=== Albums ===
- 1978: David, Daydreamin' on a Rainy Day (Sesame Street #CTW 25518)

=== Singles ===
- 1973: "Stop (If I'm Gonna Save Any Part Of My Love For You)" b/w "Heart Of Stone" (United Artists #UA-XW311-W)
- 1974: "Meant to Be" (United Artists #UA-XW401)
- 1976: "My Name Is David" b/w "Subtraction Blues" (Sesame Street #CTW 99019)
- 1978: "More of the Same" w. Linda Gache (Statler #S9000)

== Filmography ==
=== Film ===
Film
| Year | Title | Role | Notes |
|---|---|---|---|
| 1973 | Together for Days | Calvin | |

=== Television ===
Television
| Year | Title | Role | Notes |
|---|---|---|---|
| 1971–1989 | Sesame Street | David | 1,268 episodes |
| 1971 | The Secret Storm | Jim Price | 1 episode |
| 1978 | A Special Sesame Street Christmas | David | Television film |
| 1978 | Christmas Eve on Sesame Street | David | Television film |
| 1983 | Don't Eat the Pictures | David | Television film |
| 1988 | Sesame Street: Put Down the Duckie | David | Television film |
