= Desiree Casado =

American actress

Desiree Casado is an American actress most notable for the role of Gabriela "Gabi" Rodriguez on Sesame Street, the daughter of longstanding main characters Luis and Maria. Casado took over the role in 1993 (being the first child actress hired to appear on Sesame Street). Casado got the role when the previous actress, Gabriela Rose Reagan (the real-life daughter of the actress playing Maria, Sonia Manzano), told her mother she did not enjoy being on television. The character of Gabi has become a more integral part of the show's cast in the last couple of years, perhaps mostly to fulfill Sesame Workshop's need to sustain youth among the cast, as the old guard of the show ages. Casado's character of Gabriela is one of only a handful of Latino/Latina characters who have appeared on Sesame Street.

In addition to her role as Gabi, Casado appeared in various television commercials (including for Jell-O). Her film credits include I Like It Like That (1994), Bed of Roses (1996), Joe's Apartment (1996), Wishful Thinking (1997), Gloria (1999), and Anamorph (2007). In 2004, she acted in her first starring role in the independent film Juicy. She also played a small role on the soap opera One Life to Live. She has also appeared in character as Gabi at Sesame Place, promoting "Healthy Habits" in 2006. According to her official Sesame Street cast biography, Casado loves to dance, especially hip-hop, and is taking ballet lessons. As of 2012, she was also working as a sixth grade teacher while continuing her dream as an actress as well as her appearances on the show and married Michael Miller that year.
