= Count Us In: Growing Up with Down Syndrome =

1994 book by Jason Kingsley and Mitchell Levitz

- Second edition
- Author: Jason Kingsley; Mitchell Levitz
- Language: English
- Genre: Memoir
- Publisher: Mariner Books
- Publication date: January 12, 1994
- Publication place: United States
- Media type: Print, ebook
- Pages: 219 pp.
- ISBN: 978-0156226608 (Hardcover)

Count Us In: Growing Up with Down Syndrome is a nonfiction book written by Jason Kingsley and Mitchell Levitz who both have Down syndrome. Kingsley and Levitz discuss their lives and views on Down syndrome.

== Summary ==
Published in 1994, the book chronicles the friendship of Jason Kingsley and Mitchell Levitz. The book was edited in part by Jason Kingsley's mother, Emily Kingsley. The stories were based on 50 transcripts of conversations where the two express their ideas on various issues including friendship, marriage, sexual relationships, politics, jobs, finance and independence from their families. Kingsley and Levitz also discuss how they were raised under a home-based early intervention program, instead of focusing only on the disabilities associated with Down syndrome.
