= Victor DiNapoli =

Victor DiNapoli is an American television director and production designer. He is sometimes credited as Victor Di Napoli.

== Positions held ==
- Senior Scenic Artist on Sesame Street and Christmas Eve on Sesame Street (1978)
- Art Director on Don't Eat the Pictures (1983)
- Second Unit Director on Elmo Saves Christmas
- Production Designer on Shalom Sesame (1987), The Muppets at Walt Disney World, Sesame Street's 25th Birthday: A Musical Celebration! (1993), Barney Live! In New York City (1994). Sesame Street Jam: A Musical Celebration (1994), Elmo Saves Christmas (1996), Sesame Street: Three Bears and a New Baby (2003), and Sesame Street (2005 - 2007), several Barney & Friends live shows and home videos including Barney Live in New York City
- Set Designer on Barney's Big Surprise
- Director on Elmo's World: The Wild Wild West (2001), Elmo Visits the Fire House (2002), Sesame Street: Happy, Healthy Monsters (2004), Sesame Street Presents: The Street We Live On (2004), What's the Name of That Song (2004), Sesame Street: Friends to the Rescue (2005), Elmo's World: Reach for the Sky (2006), Elmo's World: Pets! (2006), A Sesame Street Christmas Carol (2006), Elmo's World: What Makes You Happy? (2007) and Sesame Street (2000 - 2007).

== Awards and nominations ==
DiNapoli has been nominated for twenty Daytime Emmy awards in the categories Outstanding Achievement in Art Direction/Set Decoration/Scenic Design, Outstanding Art Direction/Set Decoration/Scenic Design, and Outstanding Direction in a Children's Series, for his work on Sesame Street. He was nominated from 1990 to 2008, and won eight times in 1990, 1993, 2002, 2004, 2005 (twice), 2006 and 2007. His first DE win was shared with Mike Pantuso and Nat Mongioi.
