= Mr. Snuffleupagus =

Character on Sesame Street

- Sesame Street character
- First appearance: "Big Bird Meets Mr. Snuffleupagus" (November 15, 1971)
- Created by: Kermit Love
- Performed by: Jerry Nelson (1971–1980); Michael Earl Davis (1980–1981); Martin P. Robinson (1981–present)

In-universe information
- Aliases: Snuffy, Snuffleupagus, Mr. Snuffleupagus, Aloysius (by his mother), Snuffs
- Species: Snuffleupagus
- Gender: Male
- Nationality: American

Aloysius Snuffleupagus (/ˌsnʌfəlˈʌpəɡəs/), more commonly known as Mr. Snuffleupagus or Snuffy for short, is one of the characters on Sesame Street. Designed by Kermit Love, his head bears resemblances to elephants and mammoths, but he has no tusks or (visible) ears. He also has a tail similar in shape to that of a dinosaur (like a sauropod; in particular, a Brontosaurus). He has thick, brown hair and a trunk, or "snuffle", that drags along the ground. Snuffy is also Big Bird's best friend, and has a younger sister named Alice.

== History ==
For many years, only Big Bird would see Snuffy, because he would always leave while Big Bird went to get the others, leading everyone else to believe Snuffy was simply an imaginary friend. After Sesame Street Presents: Follow That Bird, Big Bird finally succeeded in revealing Snuffy to his friends on Sesame Street. Before that, the main adult characters teased Big Bird when he said that he had seen Snuffleupagus, because they did not believe that there was such an animal. This was often despite evidence to the contrary, such as an oversized teddy bear that Snuffy had left behind, or segments in which Snuffy interacted with other characters, such as a street scene where Snuffy was seen playing "London Bridge" with some of the neighborhood children. This was meant to echo the imaginary friends that some young children have.

Snuffy's original puppet was skinny and sunken, with an almond-shaped head and bulging green-and-yellow eyes. He also originally was perpetually depressed, speaking in a sad and echoey voice. This appearance was deemed to be somewhat frightening for younger children, so his eyes were made round and white, and his personality became friendlier.

By the late 1970s, the storylines had the adult characters becoming increasingly frustrated with Big Bird using Snuffy as a scapegoat whenever something went wrong while they were out of the room. In one episode, newspapers on Sesame Street carried the front-page headline, "Snuffy's Got to Go!" Some adults gradually began to believe Big Bird, the first being folk singer Buffy Sainte-Marie, who sang Big Bird a song about her belief in Snuffy. After Buffy's departure from the show, Linda (Linda Bove), Maria (Sonia Manzano), and Gordon (Roscoe Orman) became believers in Snuffy's existence, while the others remained skeptical about his existence.

In September 2014, Mr Snuffleupagus appeared on Good Morning America where he met his hero and purported relative, George Stephanopoulos. Stephanopoulos thanked Snuffy for "helping a generation of Americans learn to pronounce his name."

== Meeting the adults ==
This running gag of Snuffy not becoming visible to the adults ended with the Season 17 premiere of Sesame Street, episode 2096 (first aired November 18, 1985, following the release of the Sesame Street film Sesame Street Presents: Follow That Bird). Big Bird is tired of the adults refusing to believe him about Snuffy, so he decides to arrange for them to come to his nest and meet Snuffy when he yells the signaling word, "Food!" He chooses this word because he knows the grown-ups will not believe him if he tells them his real reason for inviting them to his nest, and "food" is a more credible lure. When Big Bird calls out the word, Snuffy runs off to tell his mother about the meeting, so once again the grown-ups just miss him. Gordon, wanting to help, suggests to Big Bird that he needs someone to help him keep Snuffy in his nest, and Elmo offers to be the one. Snuffy returns, then tells Elmo he had better go home and brush his fur to prepare for the grown-ups' arrival, but Elmo holds on to his snuffle so he cannot go. Big Bird yells, "Food!" as a distraction, and one by one the adults come and see Snuffy for the first time ever. They are stunned, then cautiously approach, before Big Bird returns overjoyed. Susan (Loretta Long) apologizes on behalf of the adults for disbelieving Big Bird for so long. Bob (Bob McGrath) then tells him, "From now on, we'll believe you whenever you tell us something." (Snuffy tells Big Bird they should get what Bob said in writing.) Linda (Linda Bove) then suggests that Big Bird introduce Snuffy to everyone one by one. Then-popular talk show host Phil Donahue, appearing as himself on the episode, was also introduced to Snuffy. The entire Sesame Street cast henceforth sees Snuffy regularly on the show.

In an interview on the show Still Gaming, Snuffy's performer, Martin P. Robinson, revealed that Snuffy was finally introduced to the main human cast mainly due to a string of high-profile and sometimes graphic stories of pedophilia and sexual abuse of children that aired on 60 Minutes. According to Carol-Lynn Parente, the writers felt that by having the adults refuse to believe Big Bird, they were scaring children into thinking that their parents would not believe them if they had been abused and that they would just be better off remaining silent. On the same telethon, during Robinson's explanation, Loretta Long uttered the words "Bronx daycare", a reference to reports on New York TV station WNBC-TV of alleged sexual abuse at a Bronx daycare center. This was seen in the documentary Sesame Street Unpaved.

== Spelling ==
According to sources such as the Sesame Workshop Web site and Sesame Street Unpaved, the character's name is spelled "Snuffleupagus". From the 1970s until the late 1980s, it was frequently hyphened, resulting in "Snuffle-upagus". Many licensors, closed-captioners, and fans (including websites) use spelling variations. The Jim Henson Company website has used the version "Snuffulupagus".

== Performers ==
Snuffy was first performed by Jerry Nelson, then Michael Earl, and currently Martin P. Robinson. His back end has been performed by Richard Hunt, Brian Meehl, Frank Kane, and currently Bryant Young.

== In science ==
In 2026, a newly described species of ghost pipefish living in the South Pacific Ocean was given the scientific name Solenostomus snuffleupagus, owing to its appearance reminiscent of the character. It has a long snout and is surrounded by "shaggy" red-orange filaments. The naming was supported by Sesame Workshop.

== See also ==
- "Snuffy's Parents Get a Divorce"
