= Alan Muraoka =

American actor (born 1962)

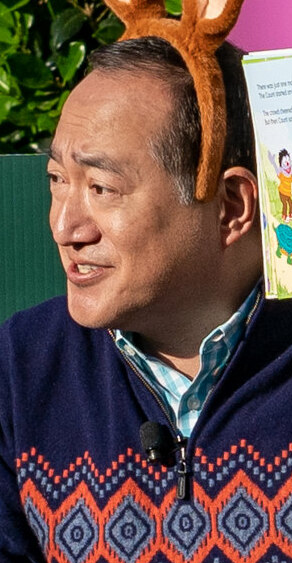
- Muraoka doing a book reading at the White House in 2023
- Born: August 10, 1962 (age 64); Mission Hills, California, U.S.
- Education: University of California, Los Angeles (BA)
- Occupation: Actor
- Years active: 1988–present

Alan Muraoka (born August 10, 1962) is an American actor. He has played Alan, the current owner of Hooper's Store, on the television show Sesame Street since 1998. He currently serves on the board of directors at the Bayard Rustin Center for Social Justice, an LGBTQIA safe-space, community activist center, and educational bridge dedicated to honoring Bayard Rustin through their mission and good works.

== Early career ==
Muraoka was born on August 10, 1962, in Mission Hills, Los Angeles, California. Muraoka's first experience as a performer came at the age of 10, where he appeared as "The Candy Man" at a movie theatre during the intermission of a double feature. According to the biography on his official site, he performed throughout high school where he also had his first experience as a director - Who's Afraid of Virginia Woolf?.

Muraoka studied at the Theater Department of UCLA and won the Carol Burnett Musical Theatre Award for performance. While at college, he performed in several Walt Disney World productions during sabbaticals and summer breaks. He received his B.A. in Theatre Arts from UCLA in 1985. Following his graduation, Muraoka worked with East West Players in Los Angeles, and spent time as a performer on Princess Cruises.

He made his Broadway debut performing six roles in the musical Mail. After Mail opened (and closed, after one month) in 1988. For the next ten years, Muraoka acted in theatrical productions, both on Broadway and in regional and touring productions. Most notably, he was a member of the original cast of Shōgun: The Musical on Broadway and had a long run in the lead role of "The Engineer" in Miss Saigon.

== 1997–present ==
After auditioning several times through 1997, Muraoka won a part on Sesame Street after doing improv with Telly Monster. He joined the cast in 1998, playing Alan, the then-new owner of Hooper's Store. In his debut episode Alan is introduced to the other characters on the street by Big Bird in a scene that ends with the song Welcome to the Party.

Muraoka has continued to act on stage, earning good reviews in the 2004 Broadway revival of Pacific Overtures. On television, he appeared in the PBS Emmy nominated special, Day of Independence from Cedar Grove Productions in 2003. In 2007 he had a small part on Showtime's series Brotherhood as Li Fang, the owner of a Rhode Island brothel.

As a director, Muraoka was highly praised for his work on the seemingly incongruous, non-traditional (all-Asian) version of William Finn and James Lapine's largely Jewish musical Falsettoland for the National Asian American Theater Company in New York in 1998. Peter Marks of The New York Times wrote about the production "Does the gambit work? Let's put it this way: You should be so talented."

In 2004, he directed veteran Sesame Street and Avenue Q puppeteers John Tartaglia, Stephanie D'Abruzzo, and Jennifer Barnhart in Empty Handed and John Tartaglia AD-LIBerty. He also directed Ann Harada, of Avenue Q and also his 1998 Falsettoland, in her 2004 one-woman show and in her one-night-only benefits for Broadway Cares/Equity Fights AIDS Christmas Eve with Christmas Eve in 2009, 2010 and 2011.

In 2006, he made a guest appearance on the soap opera One Life to Live, playing Mr. Pravat, a Thai bartender, in a bar scene along with Desiree Casado.He directed the stage production of High School Musical in 2007 at the Lyric Theatre in Oklahoma City. He also directed The Muny's 2008 production of High School Musical in St. Louis winning praise for drawing "appealing performances from his attractive young leads".

Muraoka joined the Stage Directors and Choreographers Society in 2007. In 2009, he directed Urinetown: The Musical at Trinity University in San Antonio, TX. He was hired on for the semester as the university's "Stieren Guest Artist". In addition, he taught a class on musical auditioning techniques and gave a lecture for the public.

In 2011, Muraoka made a cameo appearance on Curb Your Enthusiasm in "The Bi-Sexual" (Season 8, Episode 7), playing a Japanese tourist who informs Larry that the bow that he previously received from a Japanese chef as an apology was not a full bow, calling it a "shit bow."

Muraoka played the Narrator/Mysterious Man in Into the Woods at the Patchogue Theatre in 2019. In 2021, Muraoka co-directed the June 17th Sesame Street episode "Family Day". The episode, which focused on the diverse families of the different characters on the show, introduced the first family to include two gay dads, the characters "Nina's Brother Dave, his husband Frank, and their daughter Mia."
