= List of human Sesame Street characters =

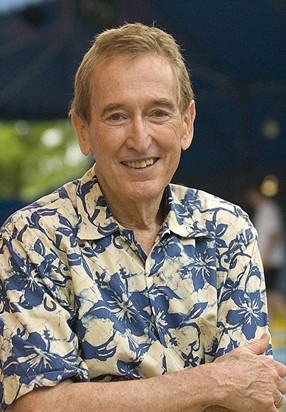
Long-running cast member Bob McGrath, who played Bob on Sesame Street from its premiere in 1969 until 2016

Since the premiere of the children's television program Sesame Street on November 10, 1969, it has included what writer Malcolm Gladwell has called "the essence of Sesame Street—the artful blend of fluffy monsters and earnest adults". The original cast, chosen by original producer Jon Stone, consisted of four human actors—Matt Robinson, who played Gordon; Loretta Long, who played Gordon's wife, Susan; Will Lee, who played Mr. Hooper; and Bob McGrath, who played Bob. Unlike most children's television programs at the time, the producers of Sesame Street decided against using a single host and cast a group of ethnically diverse, primarily African American actors/presenters, with, as Sesame Street researcher Gerald S. Lesser put it, "a variety of distinctive and reliable personalities".

Stone did not audition actors until spring 1969, a few weeks before five shows, designed to test the show's appeal to children and to examine their comprehension of the material, were due to be filmed. Stone videotaped the auditions, and researcher Ed Palmer took them out into the field to test children's reactions. The actors who received the "most enthusiastic thumbs up" were cast. For example, when the children saw Long's audition, they stood up and sang along with her rendition of "I'm a Little Teapot". As Stone said, casting was the only aspect of the show that was "just completely haphazard". Most of the cast and crew found jobs on Sesame Street through personal relationships with Stone and the other producers.

The results of the test shows, which were never intended for broadcast and shown to preschoolers in 60 homes throughout Philadelphia and in day care centers in New York City in July 1969, were "generally very positive". The researchers found that children learned from the shows, that the show's appeal was high, and that children's attention was sustained over the full hour. However, they found that, although children's attention was high during the Muppet segments, their interest wavered when there were only humans on screen. The producers had followed the advice of child psychologists who were concerned that children would be confused, and had recommended that human actors and Muppets not be shown together. As a result of this decision, the appeal of the test episodes was lower than they would have liked, so the show's producers knew they needed to make significant changes, including defying the recommendations of their advisers and show the human and Muppet characters together. Lesser called this decision "a turning point in the history of Sesame Street". Muppet creator Jim Henson and his coworkers created Muppets for Sesame Street that could interact with the human actors, and many segments were re-shot.

The human cast currently consists of Alan, Chris, Nina, Charlie, Mia, Dave and Frank. Though no longer part of the show, longtime cast members Bob, Gordon, Susan, Luis, Maria and Gina have still made special appearances on occasion, in online videos, TV specials and at live appearances. In 2019, retired characters from the series such as Linda, Miles and Leela returned for the TV special Sesame Street's 50th Anniversary Celebration.

== Characters ==
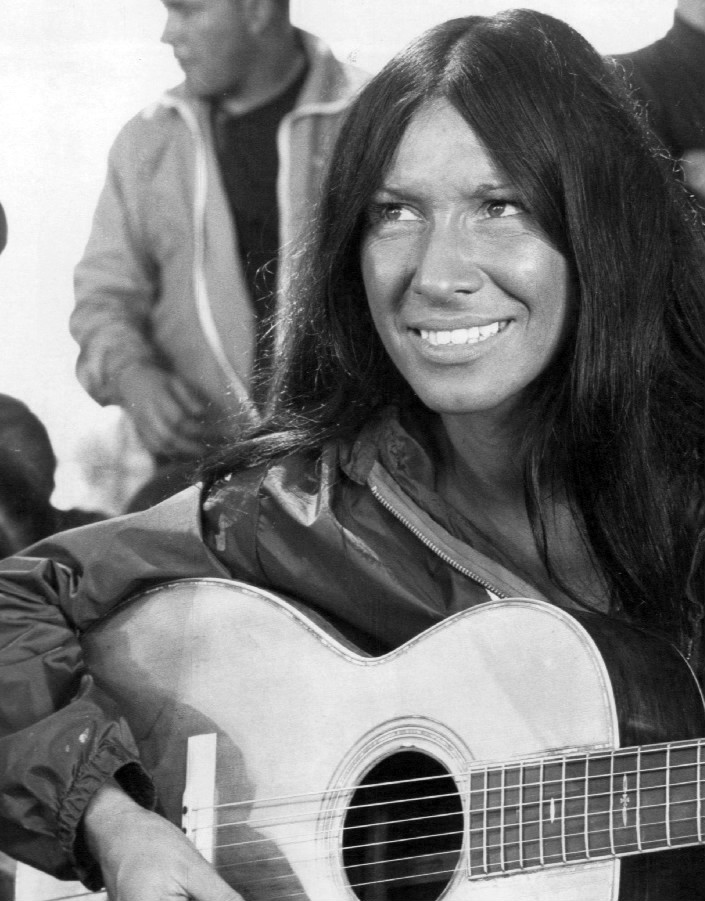
Buffy Sainte-Marie, shown here in 1970, who made appearances on Sesame Street from 1976 to 1981

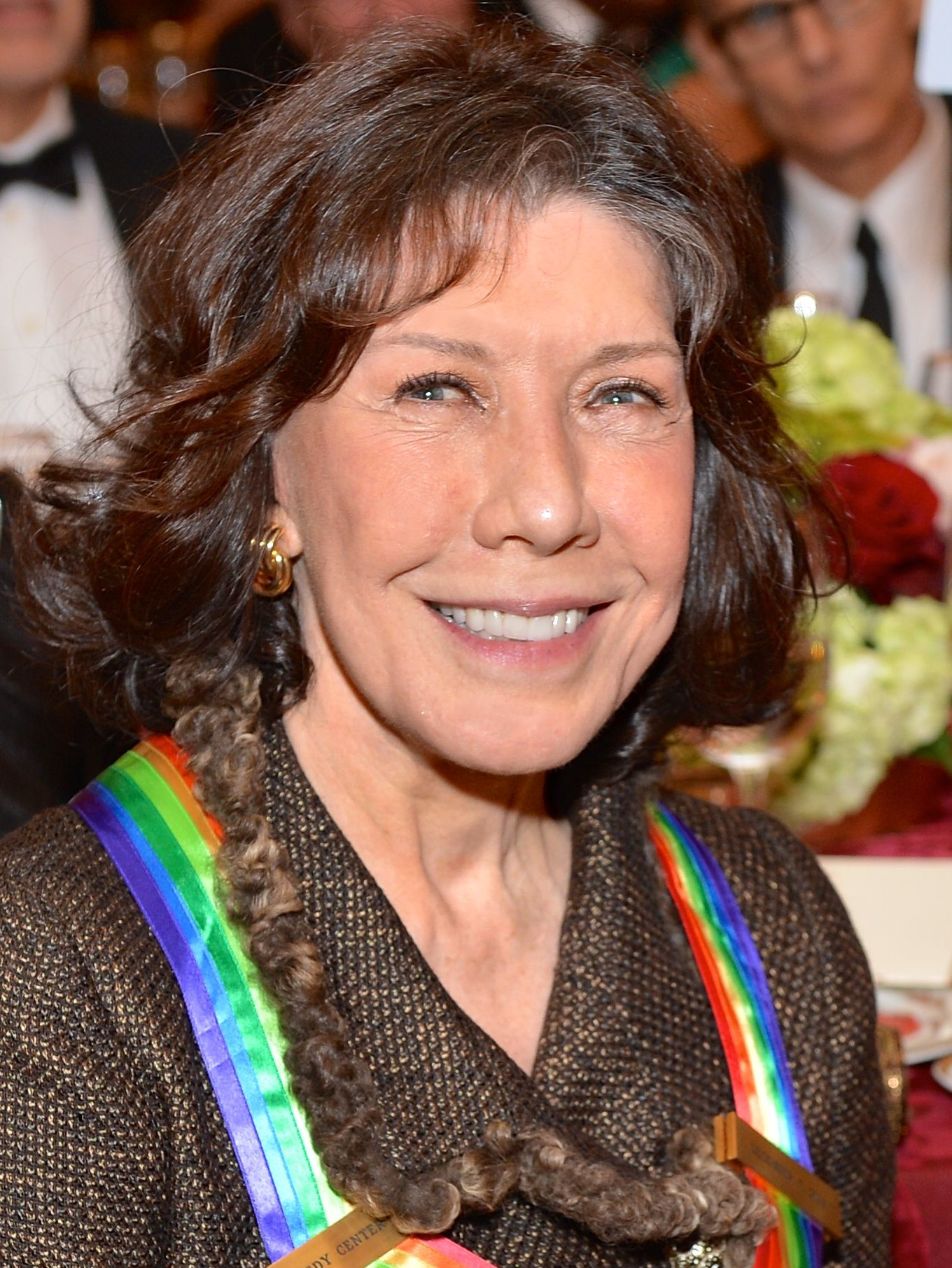
Lily Tomlin (2008), one of the many celebrities who have appeared on the show and portrayer of Edith Ann and Ernestine the Telephone Operator

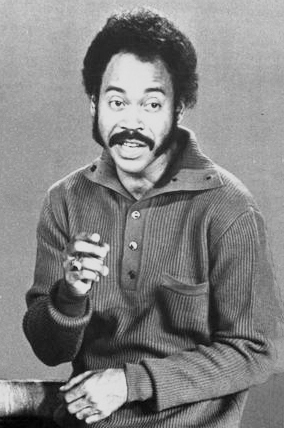
Matt Robinson, who played Gordon on Sesame Street from 1969 to 1972.

Hal Miller, who played Gordon on Sesame Street from 1972 to 1974. (shown here in 2005)

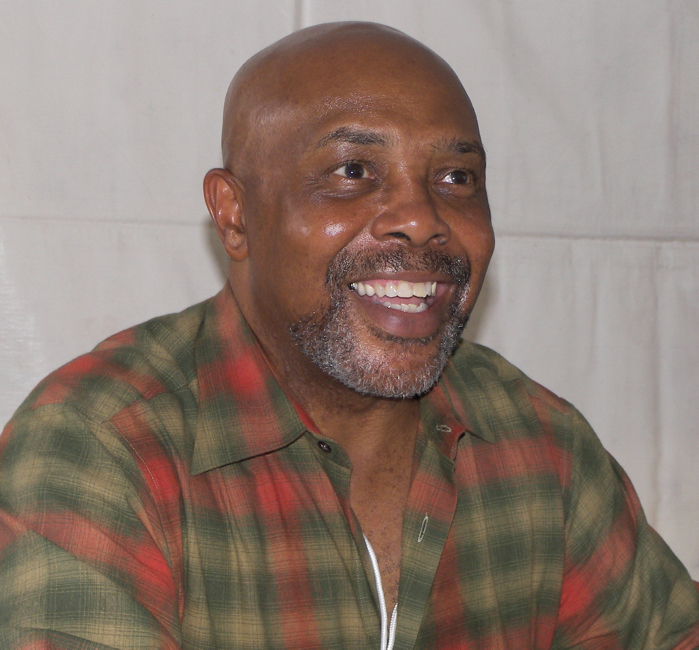
Roscoe Orman, who played Gordon on Sesame Street since 1974. (shown here in 2007)

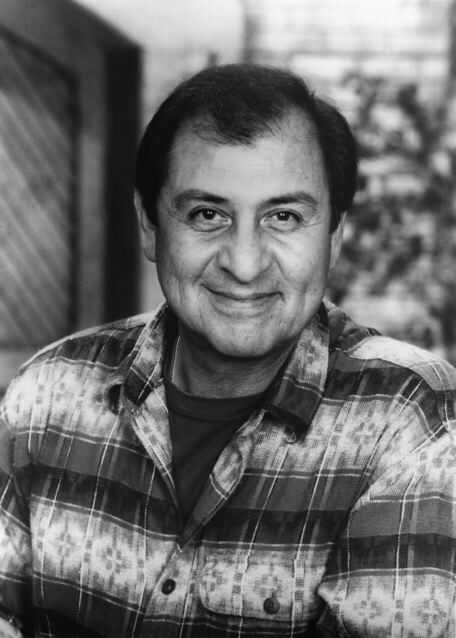
Luis, played by Emilio Delgado

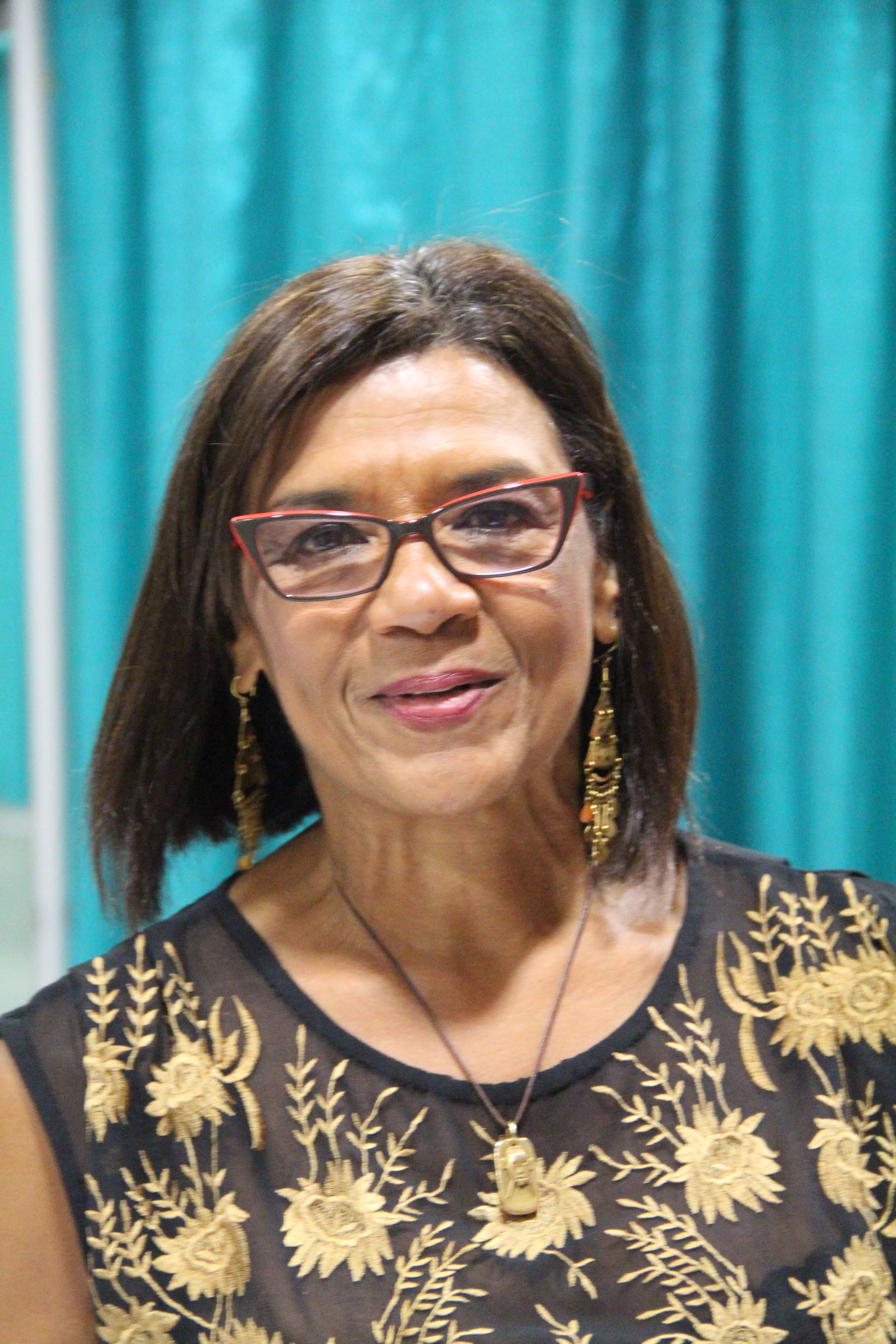
Sonia Manzano who played Maria

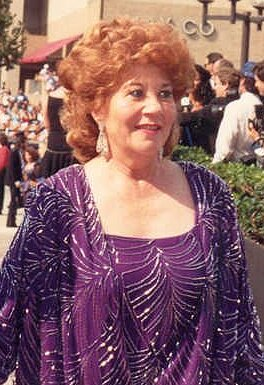
Charlotte Rae (at the 40th Primetime Emmy Awards in 1988), who played Molly in the early 1970s

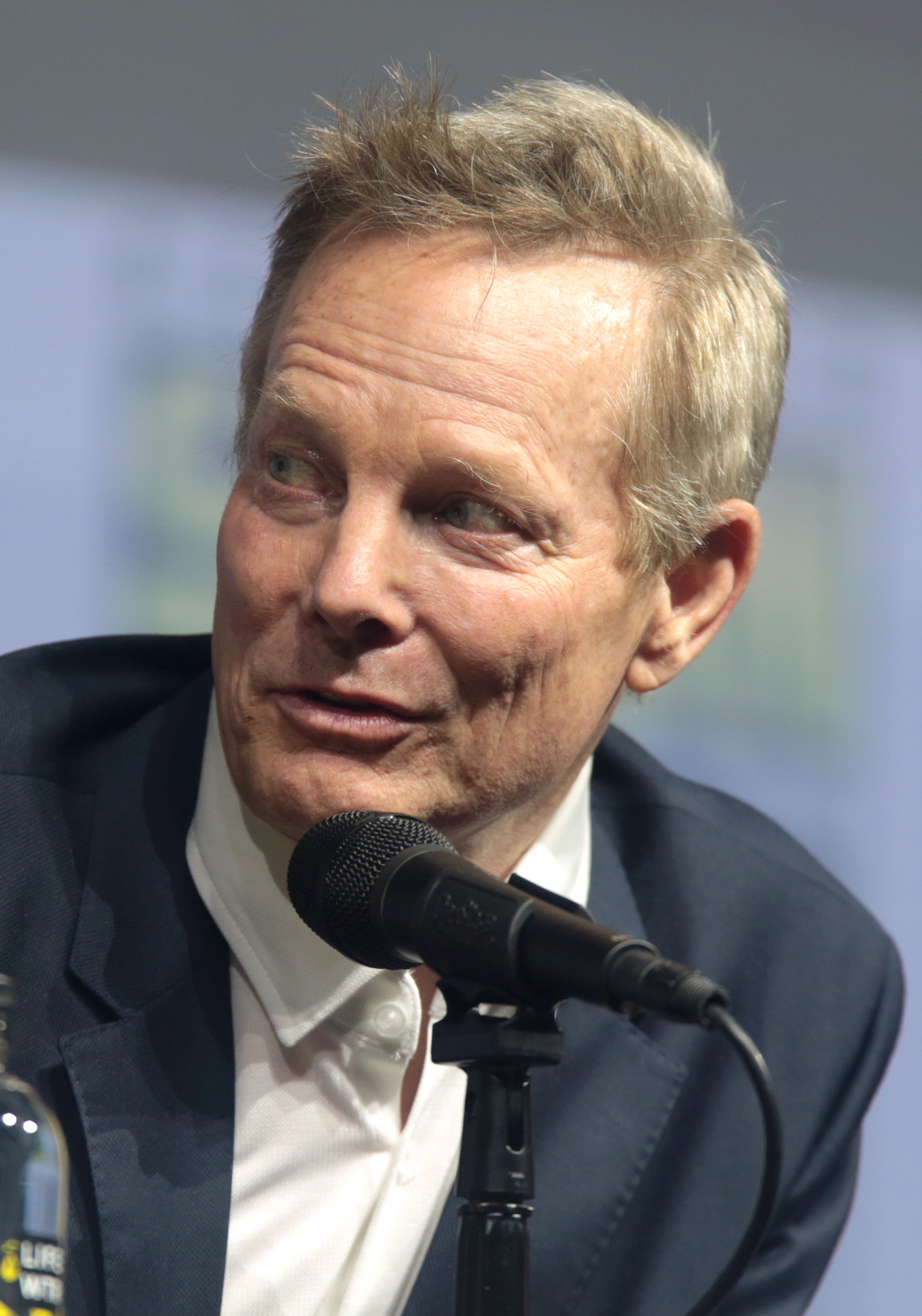
Bill Irwin the original Mr. Noodle

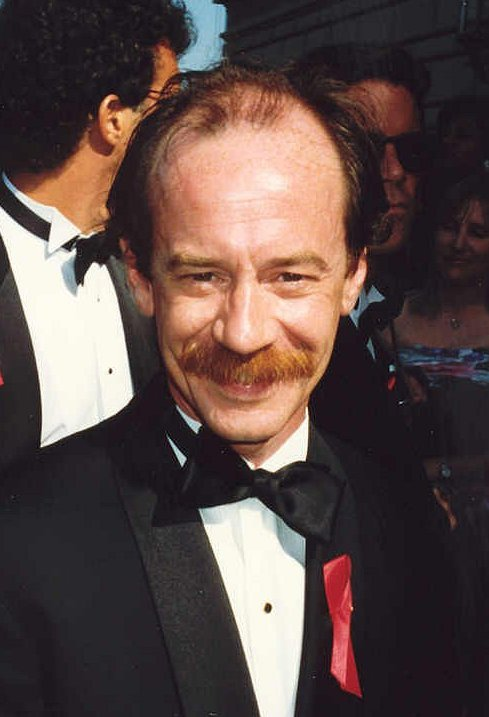
Michael Jeter (shown here in 1992), who played Mr. Noodle's brother Mr. Noodle

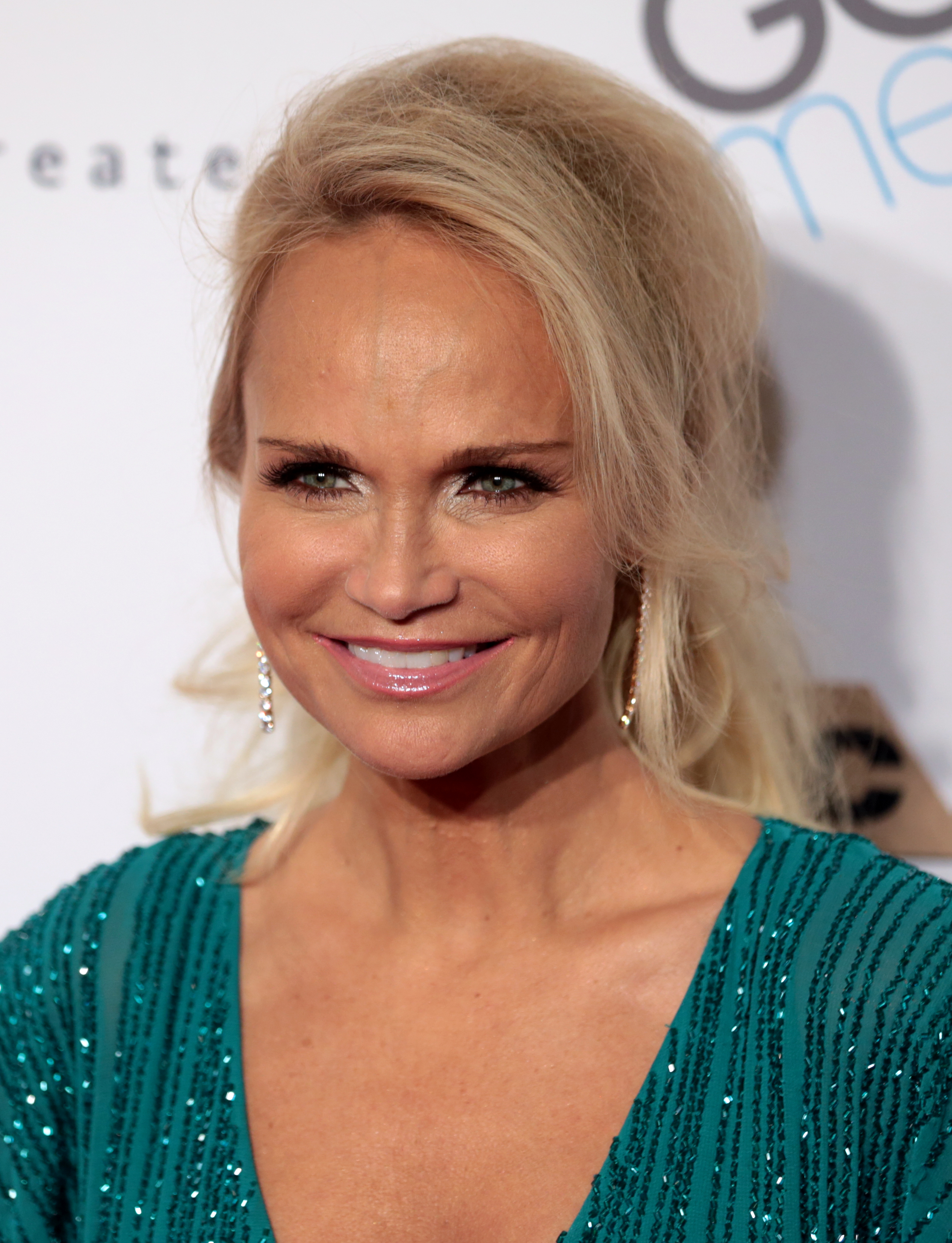
Kristin Chenoweth (shown here in 2018), who played Mr. Noodle's Sister, Ms. Noodle from 2003 to 2006

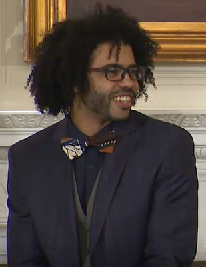
Daveed Diggs (2016), who played one of Mr. Noodle's Brothers

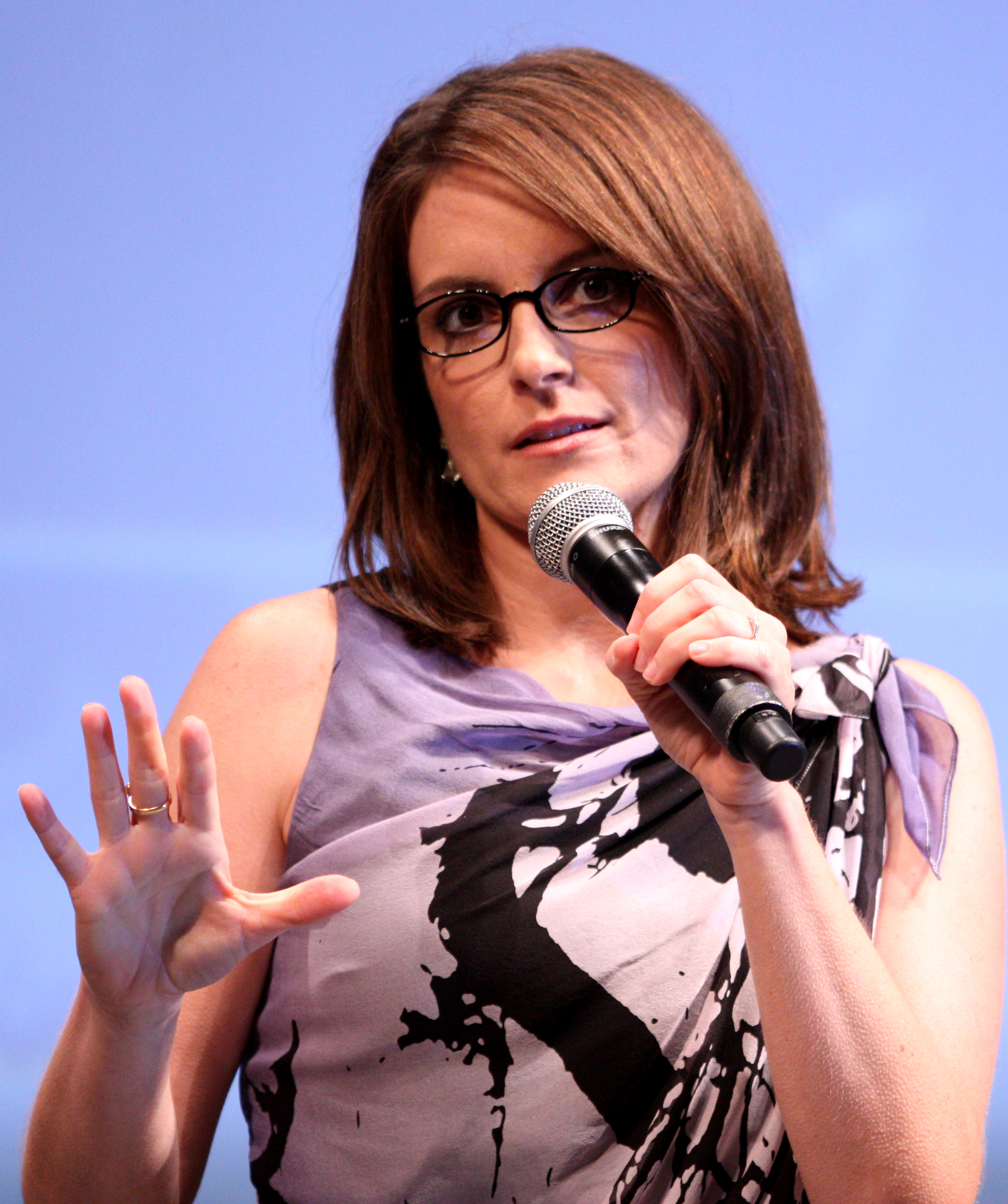
Tina Fey played a pirate captain in episode 4135 in 2007

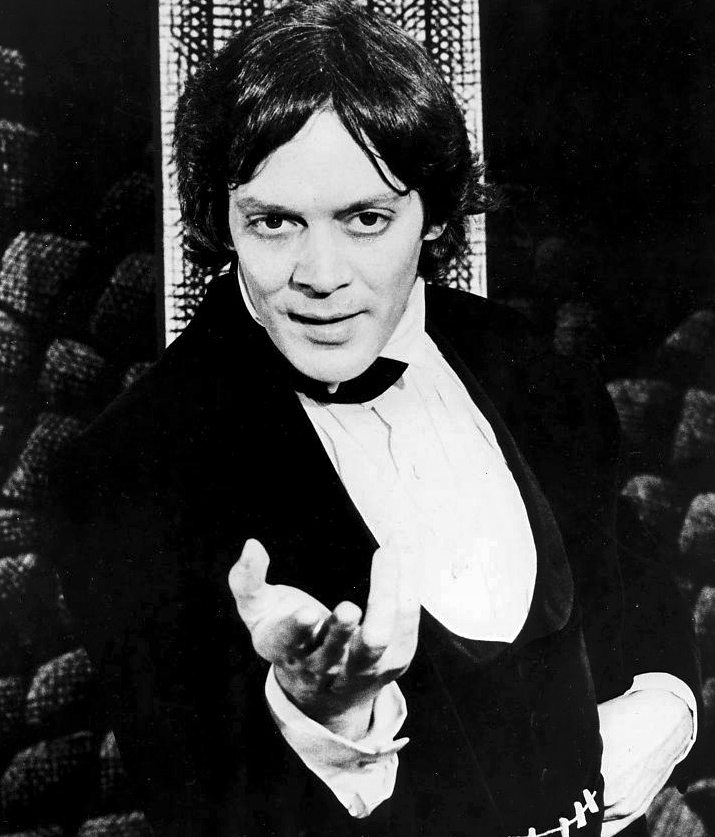
Raúl Juliá (shown here in 1977), who played Rafael in 1971

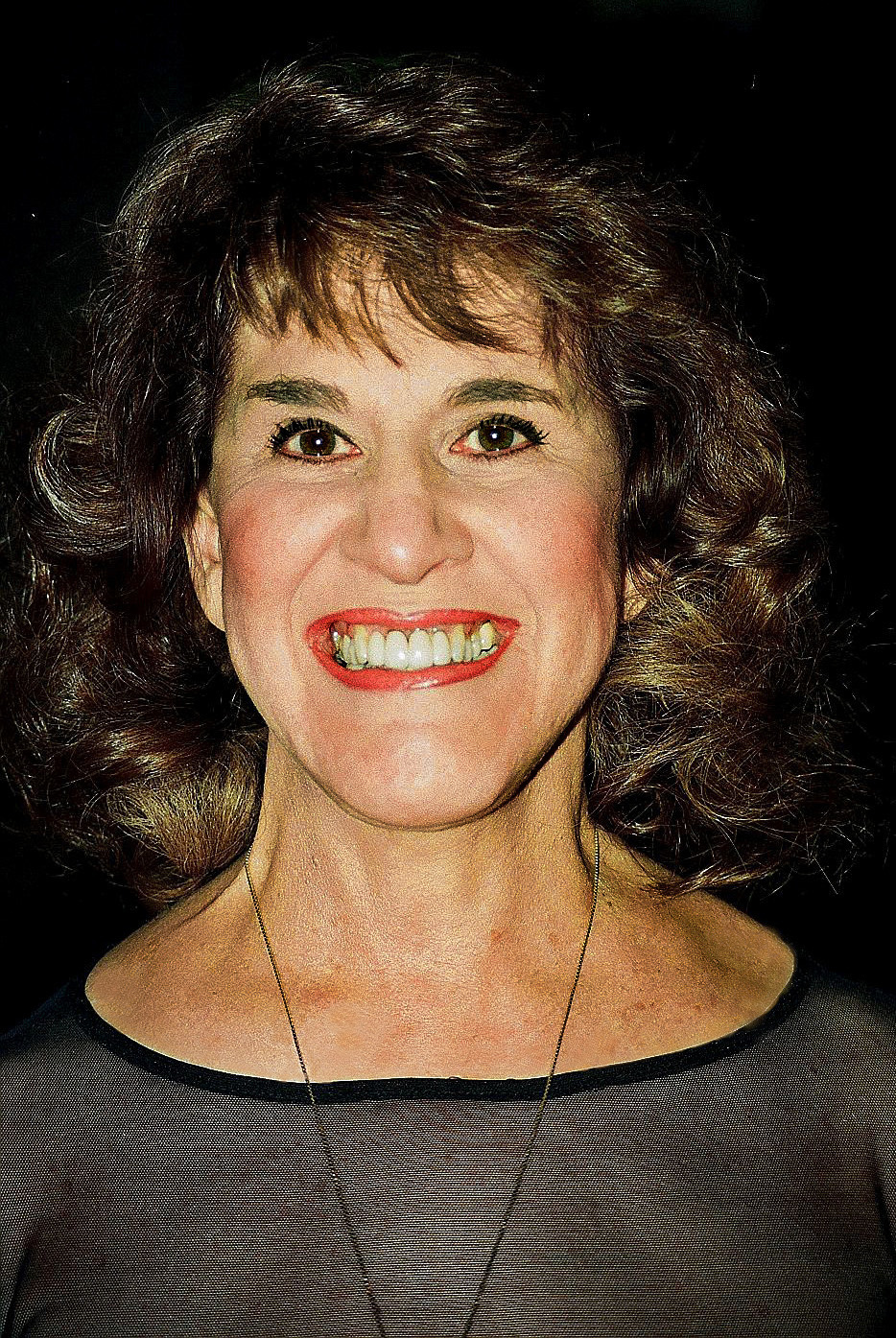
Ruth Buzzi (shown here in 1996), who played Ruthie from 1993 to 2001

Character	Actor	Description
Alan	Alan Muraoka	A "warm and welcoming character", who's been the proprietor of Hooper's Store since its more contemporary redesign in 1998.
Angela	Angel Jemmott	Part of the "Around-the-Corner" expansion of the 1990s, Angela was a day care worker. She was the wife of Jamal and mother of baby Kayla.
Antonio	Panchito Gómez	The son of Rafael.
Armando "Mando"	Ismael Cruz Córdova	An energetic Puerto Rican Latino writer and "techie [who] loves his gadgets".
Billy Tuesday	Taylor Matalon	Jane Tuesday's "wily and mischievous brother", who seems to always be at the scene of the crime.
Bob Johnson	Bob McGrath	An original cast member and Sesame Street's resident music teacher.
Buddy and Jim	Brandon Maggart and Jim Catusi	"Two bumblers" who appeared in the first season of Sesame Street.
Buffy	Buffy Sainte-Marie	American folk singer who appeared in an "understated" scene about breastfeeding with Big Bird and her infant son Cody. Buffy helped introduce Native American culture to Sesame Street's audience.
Carlo	Carlo Alban	A teenager who worked at Hooper's Store.
Celina	Annette Calud	A regular for five years who was part of the "Around the Corner" expansion. She was a dance teacher.
Charlie	Violet Tinnirello	8-year-old Charlotte, nicknamed "Charlie", who moved to Sesame Street after her parents retired from the military. Her mother is played by Muppet performer Jennifer Barnhart.
Chris Robinson	Chris Knowings	A student who works part-time at Hooper's Store. He is the nephew of Gordon and Susan.
Christy Robinson	Christy Knowings	Chris' twin sister (also in real life); appeared in 3 episodes.
Cody	Dakota Starblanket Wolfchild	Infant son of Buffy Saint-Marie and Sheldon Wolfchild; was breast-fed by his mother on-air, and helped demonstrate sibling rivalry with Big Bird.
David	Northern Calloway	A hip and upbeat individual fond of eccentric hats who worked at Hooper's Store. He eventually took over management of the store after Mr. Hooper's death.
Duane	Donald Faison	One of Jelani's group of friends, along with Tyrone and Lamar, who formed their own after-school company, "Jelani and Company".
Edith Ann	Lily Tomlin	A comic, childlike character who appeared in five segments.
Ernestine	Lily Tomlin	A nasal-voiced telephone operator.
Gabriela "Gabi" Rodriguez	Bryan Maitland; Brittany and Sarah Beaudry; Morgan DeSena; Gabriela Rose Reagan; Desiree Casado	Daughter of Luis and Maria Rodriguez (born 1989), her character was created as part of the show's curriculum about love, marriage, and childbirth.
Dr. Gina Jefferson	Alison Bartlett-O'Reilly	Started on the show as a teenager who worked in Hooper's Store. She ran a daycare center, later became a veterinarian, and adopted a baby named Marco from Guatemala.
Gordon Robinson	Garrett Saunders; Matt Robinson; Hal Miller; Roscoe Orman	Named for photographer-filmmaker Gordon Parks. He is a science teacher who owned the brownstone "123 Sesame Street" building with his wife Susan and Miles' father. He was the first character introduced in the show's premiere. Davis described him as "a dutiful husband and steady provider, a well-liked and respected figure in the neighborhood." He is also the father figure of Big Bird and all the Sesame Street characters.
Grace	Clarice Taylor	David's grandmother.
Hiroshi	Gedde Watanabe	A Japanese artist.
Mr. Harold Hooper	Will Lee	The original proprietor of Hooper's Store. Lee described Mr. Hooper as "the gruff grocer with the warm heart". Sesame Street dealt with Lee's 1982 death in what Davis called "a landmark broadcast" that aired on Thanksgiving Day, 1983.
Jamal	Jou Jou	A park ranger who was married to Angela and had a baby named Kayla.
Jane Tuesday	Kyla Taub	A 7-year-old private investigator in a series of short films.
Jason	Jason Kingsley	Child with Down syndrome who made 55 appearances on the show from the early-to-mid 1970s. Jason was the son of writer Emily Kingsley, who pushed for more inclusion of people with disabilities on the show.
Jelani	Eugene Byrd	Byrd was hired by producer Dulcy Singer as a part of a curriculum push about race relations.
Jennie	Jada Rowland	Appeared in first episode of Sesame Street.
Joey	Joey Calvan	
John-John	John Williams III	Best known for his count-to-20 segment with Herry Monster, Gikow said what made him stand out was his "effortless connection to the Muppets and the bold confidence of his delivery."
Kayla	Rachael McDaniel and Syvae McDaniel	Baby daughter of Angela and Jamal.
Larry and Phyllis	Alan Arkin and Barbara Dana	Played by the real-life husband and wife, they taught cooperation during season two.
Leela	Nitya Vidyasagar	Indian American character who ran Sesame Street's laundromat.
Lillian	Lillias White	Ran a daycare on Sesame Street. She was portrayed by Broadway performer White.
Linda	Linda Bove	The neighborhood librarian and Bob's girlfriend. Bove said that writer Emily Kingsley "wrote Linda as a person first, then worried about the other stuff", referring to Linda's deafness and use of American Sign Language.
Luis Rodriguez	Emilio Delgado	Davis calls Luis "a tenderhearted Hispanic man"; Luis married Maria in 1988, and his daughter Gabi was born in 1989. For more than four decades, he ran The Fix-It Shop.
Marco Jefferson	Matthew	Gina's adopted son from Guatemala.
Maria Rodriguez	Sonia Manzano	Starting as a teenager and one of the first Latinas on television, Maria is loosely based upon her portrayer's life. Maria married Luis, became co-owner of the Fix-It Shop after working under him, and had a daughter named Gabi. She had a close relationship with Oscar the Grouch, who nicknamed her Skinny.
Miguel	Jaime Sánchez	First Latino cast member.
Mike	Ward Saxton	One of Gordon's students, always after food. A romantic relationship between him and Gina was implied.
Mia	Olivia Perez	Nina's niece and the daughter of Dave and Frank, the first married gay couple on Sesame Street.
Miles Robinson	Miles Orman; Kevin Clash; Imani Patterson, Olamide Faison	The adopted son of Gordon and Susan Robinson (adopted 1985).
Molly	Charlotte Rae	A female mail carrier. She and Bob were very close.
Mr. Handford	Leonard Jackson; David Smyrl	A retired firefighter who took over ownership of Hooper's Store from David. Jackson played "the grumpier version" of the character, while Smyrl played the "smiling, singing" Mr. Handford.
Mr. MacIntosh	Chester O'Brien	A fruit vendor played by Sesame Street's floor manager.
Mr. Noodle	Bill Irwin	A mime featured in Elmo's World, whose mistakes empower viewers to, as writer Louise Gikow puts it, "call out instructions that allow them to feel smarter than the adult."
Mr. Noodle's Brother, Mr. Noodle	Michael Jeter	Mr. Noodle's brother who appeared in the Elmo's World segments, often with his brother.
Mr. Noodle's Sister, Ms. Noodle	Kristin Chenoweth	Mr. Noodle's sister who appeared in Elmo's World.
Mr. Noodle's Other Sister, Miss Noodle	Sarah Jones	Mr. Noodle's other sister; like Irwin, Jeter, and Chenoweth, Jones is a Tony award winner.
Mr. Noodle's Brothers	Daveed Diggs; Daniel Koren	Appeared in the retooled Elmo's World, with Irwin's Noodle and their three pet dogs, Schmoodle, Floodle, and Frank.
Nina	Suki Lopez	A young bilingual Hispanic woman of Cuban descent who works at both the bike shop and the Sesame Street's laundromat.
The Number Painter	Paul Benedict	A bowler-capped fellow in several short films, he would randomly pop up in places and paint his surroundings with big red numbers.
Olivia Robinson	Alaina Reed	Gordon's sister and a professional photographer. Olivia was well known for her many musical performances on the show.
Pirate Captain	Tina Fey	A "swashbuckling captain" of the Bookaneers, a group of pirates who love to read.
Piri	Eddie Castrodad	A teenager who worked at Hooper's Store.
Rafael	Raul Julia	A Puerto Rican man who was partnered with Luis in the L & R Fix-It Shop.
Ruthie	Ruth Buzzi	The enthusiastic proprietor of Sesame Street's thrift shop Finders Keepers; part of the "Around the Corner" expansion in the early 1990s. After her shop was removed from the set in 1998, she continued to make appearances in inserts for a few years.
Sally		A young girl who appeared in the first episode of Sesame Street.
Savion	Savion Glover	Brought on Sesame Street to provide viewers with a positive teen role model, Savion was a dancer whose character was based upon his portrayer. He and Gina, when they were teenagers, battled prejudice against interracial couples.
Sheldon	Sheldon Wolfchild	Buffy's husband and Cody's father; the family's appearance on the show was called "the first time Sesame Street has had a nuclear family."
Susan Robinson	Loretta Long	Gordon's wife and Miles' mother, one of four regular characters that appeared on the show's premiere. She "evolved from housewife to nurse to working mother" over the years. She is also the mother figure to Big Bird and all the Sesame Street characters.
Tarah	Tarah Schaeffer	The first regularly appearing character on Sesame Street who used a wheelchair; served as a positive role model for children with disabilities.
Tom	Larry Block	Worked at Hooper's Store.
Trash Gordon	Roscoe Orman	A spoof of the 1930s superhero Flash Gordon.
Mrs. Mae Trump	Loretta Tupper	Played by the radio performer of the 1930s and 1940s, she played the piano on Sesame Street.
Uncle Wally	Bill McCutcheon	Bob's eccentric uncle. He is a travelling salesman. The Los Angeles Times called Wally "a fun-loving, down-to-earth, endearing older gentleman."
Wanda Falbo (Word Fairy)	Andrea Martin	Played by SCTV alum who won an Emmy for her work on Sesame Street.
Wally and Ralph	Paul Price and Joe Ponazecki	A comedy team in the tradition of Laurel and Hardy who appeared during season 3.
Willy	Kermit Love	A hot dog vendor. He was played by the Muppet designer who co-created Big Bird and Mr. Snuffleupagus.

== See also ==
- List of Sesame Street Muppets
- List of animated Sesame Street characters

== General and cited references ==
- Borgenicht, David (1998). Sesame Street Unpaved. New York: Hyperion Publishing. ISBN 0-7868-6460-5
- Davis, Michael (2008). Street Gang: The Complete History of Sesame Street. New York: Viking Penguin. ISBN 978-0-670-01996-0
- Gikow, Louise A. (2009). Sesame Street: A Celebration—Forty Years of Life on the Street. New York: Black Dog & Leventhal Publishers. ISBN 978-1-57912-638-4.
- Gladwell, Malcolm (2000). The Tipping Point: How Little Things Can Make a Big Difference. New York: Little, Brown, and Company. ISBN 0-316-31696-2
- Lesser, Gerald S. (1974). Children and Television: Lessons From Sesame Street. New York: Vintage Books. ISBN 0-394-71448-2
