= Emily Kingsley =

American writer

Emily Perl Kingsley (born February 28, 1940) is an American writer who joined the Sesame Street team in 1970 and continued to write until her retirement in 2015.

Her son Jason Kingsley was born with Down syndrome in 1974. Her experiences with Jason inspired her to include people with disabilities into the Sesame Street cast, including Tarah Schaeffer, an actress who uses a wheelchair, and even Jason himself. Jason's story was the topic of an hour-long NBC television special in 1977, titled "This Is My Son", and with co-author Mitchell Levitz, Jason wrote the book "Count Us In: Growing Up with Down Syndrome".

In 1987, Kingsley wrote "Welcome to Holland", a widely published and translated piece which compares the experience of someone finding out their child has a disability to having a trip to Italy rerouted to Holland. The same year a made-for-television movie she wrote Kids Like These, premiered on CBS. The film, about a middle-aged couple who have a son with Down syndrome, won numerous awards.

Kingsley has written over 20 children's books and two Sesame Street home video releases (Kids' Guide to Life: Learning to Share and Elmo Says Boo!). She has had written for other companies as well, including two video games for Disney Interactive.

She has won 23 Daytime Emmys through her work with Sesame Street, three EDIs and a Grand EDI from Easter Seals, and an award from the National Theatre of the Deaf.

== Credits ==
=== Filmography ===
Year	Title	Notes
1970–2015	Sesame Street	Writer
1989	Richard Scarry's Best Counting Video Ever	Writer
1989	Richard Scarry's Best ABC Video Ever	Writer
1996	Sesame Street - Kids' Guide to Life: Learning to Share	Writer
1997	Elmo Says Boo!	Writer

=== Bibliography ===
Year	Title	Publisher	ISBN	Pages	Notes
1977	Sesame Street: The Great Cookie Thief	Western Publishing	0-307-58012-1	24	
1978	Sesame Street: The Exciting Adventures of Super-Grover	Western Publishing	0-307-12077-5	48	
1980	Sesame Street: Big Bird Follows the Signs	Western Publishing	0-307-07021-2	24	
1980	Sesame Street: Farley Goes to the Doctor	Western Publishing	0-307-23113-5	24	
1980	Sesame Street: I Can Do It Myself	Western Publishing	0-307-23104-6	24	
1980	Sesame Street: The Sesame Street Pet Show	Western Publishing	0-307-23102-X	24	
1981	Sesame Street: The Sesame Street Circus of Opposites	Western Publishing	0-307-23141-0	26	
1981	Sesame Street: The Sesame Street Players Present — The Little Red Hen	Western Publishing	0-307-23135-6	25	
1983	Sesame Street: Everyone Makes Mistakes	Western Publishing	0-307-23151-8	26	
1984	Sesame Street: A Baby Sister for Herry	Western Publishing	0-307-12011-2	24	
1985	Sesame Street: Welcome Home, Big Bird	Western Publishing	0-307-13781-3	25	
1986	An American Tail: The Storybook	Grosset & Dunlap	0-448-48612-1	64	Novelization of the Universal/Amblin film.
1987	Sesame Street: A Sitter for Baby Monster	Western Publishing	0-307-12022-8	25	

Emily has won 22 Emmy Awards for her work as a writer of Sesame Street.

In October 2008, Emily received a special award from the U.S. Government Department of Health and Human Services in recognition of her groundbreaking work including individuals with disabilities on Sesame Street for 38 years.

== See also ==
- "Welcome to Holland"
