= Jason Kingsley (actor) =

American actor (born 1974)

Jason Kingsley (born June 27, 1974) is an American actor who was born with Down syndrome. In 1975, Kingsley made his television debut on Sesame Street at 15 months old and appeared in 55 episodes. He also guest-starred in a 1984 episode of The Fall Guy, and episodes of All My Children and Touched by an Angel.

Kingsley was born to Emily and Charles Kingsley. His mother is a writer for Sesame Street and his father was a painting contractor. Kingsley graduated from Lakeland High School in 1994, and passed all six special education Regents Competency Tests. In June 1997, he graduated from Maplebrook School, a post-secondary school for students with learning disabilities.

In 1994, Harcourt Brace published Count Us In: Growing Up with Down Syndrome, a book Kingsley co-wrote with friend Mitchell Levitz about their experiences with Down syndrome.

== Television ==
| Year | Title | Role | Notes |
|---|---|---|---|
| 1975–19?? | Sesame Street | Jason | 55 episodes |
| 1984 | The Fall Guy | Jason | Episode: "The Winner" |
| 1997 | Touched by an Angel | David | Episode: "An Angel by Any Other Name" |
| 2004 | Sesame Street | Himself | Episode: 4072 |
