= Leonard Jackson (actor) =

American actor (1928–2013)

- Born: February 7, 1928; Jacksonville, Florida, U.S.
- Died: December 22, 2013 (aged 85); Manhattan, New York, U.S.
- Resting place: Calverton National Cemetery
- Other name: L. Errol Jaye
- Education: Fisk University
- Occupation: Actor
- Years active: 1936–1997
- Spouse: Ada Edward (m. 1958)

Leonard Jackson (February 7, 1928 – December 22, 2013) was an American stage, film, and television actor. He had roles in several PBS television series for children, including Shining Time Station and Sesame Street, and also acted in several films, including The Brother from Another Planet, Car Wash, and The Color Purple.

== Early years and stage career ==
Jackson, in his early years known as L. Errol Jaye, was born February 7, 1928, in Jacksonville, Florida. He served in the United States Navy during World War II. After attending Fisk University, his professional acting debut was on the stage, in New York Shakespeare Festival's 1965 off-Broadway production of Troilus and Cressida. In March 1968, he played Mr. Carpentier, the title character, in The Electronic Nigger, part of a trio of one-act plays by Ed Bullins, during The American Place Theatre production of the play's premiere. He played a pastor in the Broadway premiere of The Great White Hope, which ran for over 500 performances at the Alvin Theatre during 1968–1970.

As Leonard Jackson, he returned to Broadway two years later, first in the premiere of Conor Cruise O'Brien's Murderous Angels and after its short run, to a Broadway revival of the Kurt Weill musical Lost in the Stars at the Imperial Theatre.

A dozen years later, Jackson returned to Broadway for the premiere of Ma Rainey's Black Bottom, which ran for 276 performances and was chosen "Best Play" by the New York Drama Critics Circle. In 1991, Jackson was part of the cast for the Broadway premiere of Mule Bone, an unfinished play written by Langston Hughes and Zora Neale Hurston. The production, mounted for the first time sixty years after it was written, received a negative review by Frank Rich, who said the "three principal performers ... are at best likably amateurish, [though] their efforts are balanced by the assured center-stage turns of such old pros as Leonard Jackson, as a fuming man of the cloth, and Theresa Merritt."

== Children's series and guest roles ==
On television, he had a recurring role on several PBS television series for children, including Sesame Street as Mr. Hanford, Shining Time Station, as First Class Engineer Henry "Harry" Cupper and Square One TV/Mathnet. He has also been featured in episodes of dramas such as Law & Order, Homicide: Life on the Street, and Spenser: For Hire, and comedies such as Amen, The Cosby Show, and The Jeffersons.

His made-for-television films include Separate but Equal (1991) and Rage of Angels, the 1983 adaptation of the Sidney Sheldon novel.

== Death ==
Jackson died on December 22, 2013, in Manhattan, New York at age 85 of Alzheimer's disease. He was survived by his wife, Ada Jackson.

== Television and film career ==
His film roles include:

- Uptight (1968) .... Mr. Oakley (uncredited)
- Together for Days (1972) .... Phil
- Ganja & Hess (1973) .... Archie
- Five on the Black Hand Side (1973) .... John Henry Brooks
- Super Spook (1975) .... Super Spook
- Car Wash (1976) .... Earl
- The Baron (1977) .... Gus
- King of the Gypsies (1978) .... (uncredited)
- The Brother from Another Planet (1984) .... Smokey
- The Color Purple (1985) .... Pa Harris
- Eddie Murphy Raw (1987, Documentary) .... Uncle Gus
- Second Sight (1989) .... Doorman
- Basket Case 2 (1990) .... Police Commissioner
- A Rage in Harlem (1991) .... Mr. Clay
- Boomerang (1992) .... Lloyd the Chemist
- Palookaville (1995) .... Bus Driver
- Basquiat (1996) .... Jean Michel's Father
- Conspiracy Theory (1997) .... Old Man in Bookstore (final film role)
