= Bob McGrath =

American actor and singer (1932–2022)

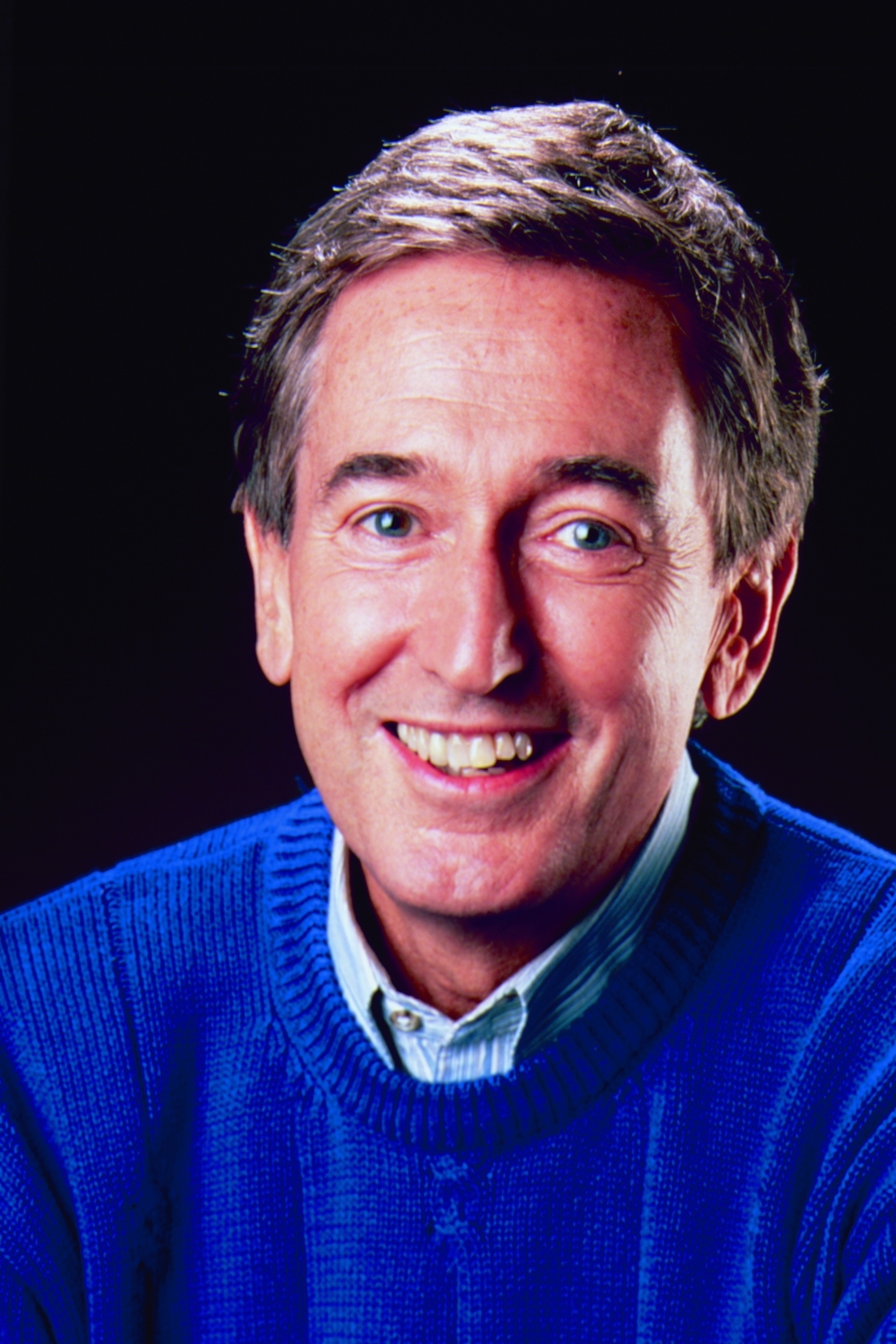
- McGrath in 1989
- Born: Robert Emmett McGrath; June 13, 1932; Ottawa, Illinois, U.S.
- Died: December 4, 2022 (aged 90); Norwood, New Jersey, U.S.
- Education: University of Michigan (BM); Manhattan School of Music (MM)
- Occupations: Actor; singer; author
- Years active: 1954–2021
- Television: Bob Johnson on Sesame Street (1969–2016, 2019)
- Spouse: Ann Logan Sperry (m. 1958)
- Children: 5

Robert Emmett McGrath (June 13, 1932 – December 4, 2022) was an American actor, singer, and children's author best known for playing original human character and music teacher Bob Johnson on the educational television series Sesame Street from 1969 to 2016.

== Early life ==
McGrath was born on June 13, 1932, in Ottawa, Illinois, the son of Flora Agnes (née Hallagan) and Edmund Thomas McGrath, a farmer. He was named for the Irish patriot Robert Emmet. As a child he sang for his family while his mother played the piano. His mother enrolled him in the Roxy Theater's Amateur Program and he finished in second place. He graduated from Marquette High School.

McGrath graduated from the University of Michigan in 1954; he went to the school of music there. He was a member of the University of Michigan Men's Glee Club and the fraternity of Phi Gamma Delta. During fraternity events he washed dishes while David Connell, a fraternity brother, waited tables, a connection Connell used when Sesame Street casting began. After graduating, McGrath was inducted into the U.S. Army; he was in Germany for two years performing for the Seventh Army Symphony Orchestra and booking for them.

McGrath earned a Master of Music degree in voice from the Manhattan School of Music in 1959.

== Career ==
McGrath worked with Mitch Miller and was the featured tenor on Miller's NBC-TV television singalong series Sing Along with Mitch for four seasons from 1960 to 1964. He was a singer on the Walt Kelly album Songs of the Pogo.

In the mid-1960s, McGrath became a recording artist in Japan, releasing a series of successful albums of Irish and other folk songs and ballads sung in Japanese. This aspect of his career was the basis of his "secret" when he appeared on the game shows To Tell the Truth in 1966 and I've Got a Secret in 1967.

From 1969 to 2016, McGrath was a regular cast member on Sesame Street, playing the music teacher Bob Johnson, along with series matriarch Susan Robinson, played by Loretta Long, McGrath was one of the two longest-lasting human characters on the series since the show's debut. Bob McGrath had a Soulful Baritenor voice. A Noggin segment proclaimed the four decades of Bob when promoting Sesame Street on that network. In July 2016, Sesame Workshop announced that McGrath would not return to the show for its 47th season because it would be retooling the series, but that McGrath would continue to represent the Workshop at public events. Sesame Workshop later announced that there would be talks to bring him back and that he would still represent Sesame Street. Although McGrath had not been in any new material since season 45, he subsequently appeared in online videos for the show. He also returned for the 2019 TV special Sesame Street's 50th Anniversary Celebration.

McGrath said that his two favorite moments on Sesame Street were Christmas Eve on Sesame Street (a 1978 Christmas special that included a pastiche of "The Gift of the Magi") and the 1983 sequence that candidly addressed the death of longtime character Mr. Hooper, played by his friend Will Lee, who had died the previous year.

== Other accomplishments ==
For 38 years, McGrath was a regular fixture on Telemiracle, a telethon broadcast annually on CTV outlets in the Canadian province of Saskatchewan. His final regular appearance at Telemiracle was in 2015, where performers at the show paid tribute to him. He returned for a special appearance in 2018. On March 3, 2006, he was awarded the Commemorative Medal for the Centennial of Saskatchewan for this work by Lieutenant Governor of Saskatchewan Lynda Haverstock. He was given the Saskatchewan Distinguished Service Award in 2013 by the Premier of Saskatchewan, Brad Wall.

He received a Distinguished Service Award for his decades of service by the Variety Children's Charity Telethon in British Columbia.

McGrath wrote many children's books, including Uh Oh! Gotta Go! (1996) and OOPS! Excuse Me Please! (1998).

In 1995, he was awarded a grant from the Foundation for Contemporary Arts Grants to Artists Award.

McGrath's Sing Me a Story was nominated for the 7th Annual Independent Music Awards for children's Album of the Year.

On April 10, 2010, he was the first recipient of the University of Michigan Men's Glee Club Lifetime Achievement Award.

== Personal life and death ==
McGrath and his wife Ann married in 1958. They had five children and eight grandchildren. The couple lived in Teaneck, New Jersey, from 1958 until 2017, after which they moved to a ranch in Norwood, New Jersey.

McGrath died from complications of a stroke at his home in Norwood on December 4, 2022, at the age of 90.

== Filmography ==
Television
Year	Title	Role	Notes	Ref.
1960–1964	Sing Along with Mitch	Singer		
1966	To Tell the Truth	Himself	1 episode	
1967	I've Got a Secret	Himself	1 episode	
1969–2016	Sesame Street	Bob Johnson		
1978	Christmas Eve on Sesame Street	Bob Johnson	TV special	
1985	Sesame Street Presents: Follow That Bird	Bob Johnson		
1996	Elmo Saves Christmas	Bob Johnson	TV special	
1999	The Adventures of Elmo in Grouchland	Bob Johnson		
2014	I Am Big Bird: The Caroll Spinney Story	Himself	Documentary film	
2019	Sesame Street's 50th Anniversary Celebration	Bob Johnson	TV special	
2021	Street Gang: How We Got to Sesame Street	Himself	Documentary film; final appearance	
