= Sonia Manzano =

American actress

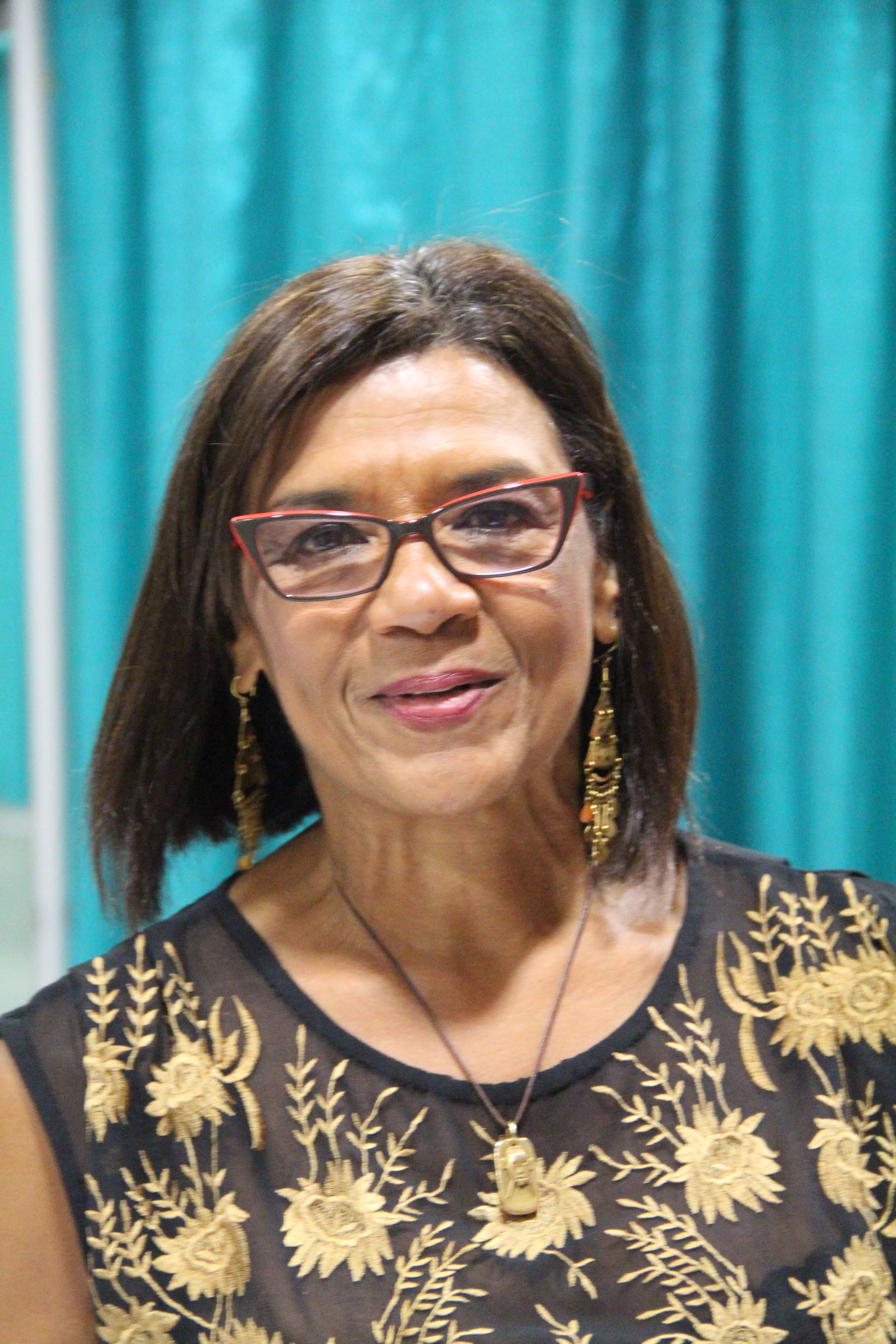
- Manzano at the 2015 Library of Congress National Book Festival in Washington, D.C.
- Born: New York City, New York, U.S.
- Education: Carnegie Mellon University (BFA)
- Occupations: Actress; writer; speaker
- Years active: 1971–present
- Known for: Maria on Sesame Street
- Board member of: March of Dimes; George Foster Peabody Awards; Symphony Space; Project Sunshine Book Club
- Children: 1
- Awards: 15 Emmy Awards for writing, 2016 Lifetime Achievement Daytime Emmy Award
- Website: www.soniamanzano.com

Sonia Manzano is an American actress, writer and speaker. She is best known for playing Maria on Sesame Street from 1971 to 2015. She received a Lifetime Achievement Daytime Emmy Award in 2016.

Her memoir, Becoming Maria: Love and Chaos in the South Bronx was published in 2015, and her works include the novel The Revolution of Evelyn Serrano as well as several children's books. She is the creator of the animated children's television series Alma's Way, from Fred Rogers Productions, and serves as an executive producer, writer and voice actor for the show.

== Early life and education ==
Manzano was born and raised in the South Bronx in New York City. Her parents came from Puerto Rico. Manzano attended the High School of Performing Arts, where she began her acting career. She attended Carnegie Mellon University in Pittsburgh on a scholarship. In her junior year, she came to New York to star in the original production of the off-Broadway show Godspell.

== Career ==
Manzano joined the production of Sesame Street in 1971, where she eventually began writing scripts for the series. On June 29, 2015, it was announced that Manzano would be retiring from the show after 44 years. Manzano did, however, later reprise the role of Maria in the 2019 television special Sesame Street's 50th Anniversary Celebration.

She has performed on the New York stage, in The Vagina Monologues and The Exonerated. She has written for the Peabody Award-winning children's series Little Bill, and has written a parenting column for the Sesame Workshop web site called "Talking Outloud". She has also appeared in multiple films, including Death Wish, Firepower, Night Flowers, Wonder Woman in Cheetah on the Prowl, Sesame Street Presents: Follow That Bird, The Adventures of Elmo in Grouchland, The Guitar, Dumped!, Missing Grandma, and Godmothered, and television programs, including B. J. and the Bear, Law & Order, and Law & Order: Special Victims Unit.

Manzano is the author of a novel, children's books, and a memoir. Her children's book No Dogs Allowed was published by Simon & Schuster Children's Publishing in 2004. The book has been adapted as a stage play. She is also the author of the novel The Revolution of Evelyn Serrano (2014). In 2015, her memoir, Becoming Maria: Love and Chaos in the South Bronx, was published. In 2022, her novel for children Coming Up Cuban was published, as part of a contract with Scholastic to publish two novels and two picture books for children.

She has served on the March of Dimes Board; the board of the George Foster Peabody Awards; and the board of a New York City theatrical institution, Symphony Space. She is a member of the board of advisors of the Project Sunshine Book Club. She was featured in the Learning Leaders (volunteers helping students succeed) poster, designed to encourage reading in NYC public schools.

In several episodes of the animated Nickelodeon series The Loud House, Manzano provides the voice of Bobby and Ronnie Anne Santiago's grandmother, Rosa Casagrande, a role she reprises in the spin-off The Casagrandes. She also portrays Judge Gloria Pepitone in Law & Order: Special Victims Unit. She also provided the voice-over narration in several animated segments in the English version of the Swedish television show Fem myror är fler än fyra elefanter.

On December 3, 2020, Deadline reported that Manzano would return to PBS to create a new animated children's television series titled Alma's Way. In Alma's Way, which was launched by PBS in October 2021, she is the creator, as well as an executive producer, writer, and voice actor.

== Honors and awards ==
Manzano was nominated twice for the Emmy Award as Outstanding Performer in a Children's Series. As a writer for Sesame Street, Manzano won 15 Emmy Awards.

In 1979, the Supersisters trading card set was produced and distributed; one of the cards featured Manzano's name and picture. In 2004, she was added to the Bronx Walk of Fame.

Manzano has received awards from the Association of Hispanic Arts, the Congressional Hispanic Caucus, the Committee for Hispanic Children and Families, the Hispanic Heritage Award for Education in 2003, and the "Groundbreaking Latina Lifetime Achievement" award from the National Association of Latina Leaders in 2005. In 2005, she was awarded an Honorary Doctorate from University of Notre Dame. The Dream Big Initiative of the Bronx Children's Museum honored Manzano in 2014.

On May 1, 2016, she received the Lifetime Achievement Emmy Award from the National Academy of Television Arts and Sciences presented to her by Rita Moreno and Mario Lopez, with a special introduction by Lin-Manuel Miranda and a retrospective of her career on Sesame Street featuring a montage of clips of her most iconic moments including Maria's classic Charlie Chaplin routine, her marriage to Luis, the birth of her daughter Gabi, coping with the death of Mr. Hooper, and appearances by fellow cast and guests including Emilio Delgado, Bob McGrath, Alan Muraoka, Loretta Long, Big Bird, Rosita, Elmo, and Sonia's real life friend Supreme Court Justice Sonia Sotomayor.

Manzano was inducted as an honorary member of Sigma Gamma Rho on July 24, 2026, at their 61st Biennial Boule in Tampa, Florida.

== Selected works ==
=== Books ===
- No Dogs Allowed! (2004)
- A Box Full of Kittens (2007)
- The Revolution of Evelyn Serrano (2014)
- Becoming Maria: Love and Chaos in the South Bronx (2015)
- Miracle on 133rd Street (2015)
- A World Together (2020)
- Coming Up Cuban (2022)
