= Sesame Street (Around the Corner Book/Era) =

Around the Corner on Sesame Street
- Zoe on the cover of Around the Corner on Sesame Street
- Author: Norman Stiles and Lou Berger
- Illustrator: Joe Mathieu
- Language: English
- Series: Pictureback Series
- Subject: Toys, Dolls, Puppets
- Genre: Children's Books
- Publisher: Random House
- Publication date: 1994
- Pages: 32
- ISBN: 067985455X 9780679854555

Around the Corner was a Sesame Street set/location expansion in Season 25 (episode 3136, [1993-1994]), until it was removed after Season 29 (1997-1998). The book Around the Corner on Sesame Street was also released in 1994 to promote the new expansion of Sesame Street.

The story takes place on 456 Sesame Street, where the characters interrupt the activities at the new Day Care Center. The ball they are playing with then bounces through The Furry Arms Hotel, and then back out to the street. Elmo hits it again, into 10 Sesame Street, and up the stairs into Celina's Dance Studio. Going out the window, it travels into Finders Keepers, and then into the Park, where Big Bird catches it and ends the game. Along the way, the book introduces the new characters that debuted in Season 25—Jamal and Angela in the Day Care Center, Sherry Netherland and Benny Rabbit in The Furry Arms Hotel, Celina in the Dance Studio, and Ruthie in "Finders Keepers". Zoe was also introduced in Season 25 and is pictured prominently on the cover.

== Bibliographic information ==
Title	Around the Corner on Sesame Street
Author	Norman Stiles
Illustrated by	Joe Mathieu
Contributor	Lou Berger
Edition	Illustrated
Publisher	Random House, 1994
ISBN	067985455X, 9780679854555
Length	32 pages

== Characters ==
Elmo, Barkley, Big Bird, Ernie, Bert, Oscar the Grouch, Grover, Jamal, Angela, Betty Lou, Zoe, Baby Bear, Otis the Elephant Elevator Operator, Benny the Bellhop, Sherry Netherland, a Dinger, Ingrid, Humphrey, Baby Natasha, Telly Monster, Hoots the Owl, Wolfgang the Seal, Slimey, Grundgetta, Joey and Davey Monkey, Herry Monster, Rosita, Celina, Ruthie, the Squirrelles, Wanda Cousteau, Cookie Monster, and a twiddlebug.

== Television show ==
Starting with season 25 (episode 3136, [1993-1994]), Sesame Street expands their street to Around the Corner. This expansion brought a boatload of new locations and human and Muppet characters to Sesame Street including but not limited to: a newsstand, the Park, the Daycare Center, the Furry Arms Hotel, Zoe, Ruthie, Celina, Jamal, and Angela.

According to Martin P. Robinson (puppeteer who performed on Sesame Street since 1981), he said:

"In Season 25, we opened up the whole "Around the Corner" set filled with new humans and dozens of new puppets. Remember the Furry Arms Hotel? It was a great cast and the plot lines were hilarious, but research discovered that kids couldn't keep track of all these people and puppets, making the shows visually exciting and entertaining for adults, but confusing for kids."

By the end of season 29 (1997-1998), the Around the Corner expansion was removed.

=== Sesame Street Stays Up Late! ===
Sesame Street Stays Up Late! is a 1993 New Year's Eve special with guest appearances by characters from some of the international versions of Sesame Street. The special was first broadcast on December 29, 1993, with the subtitles: "A Monster New Year's Eve Party". Everyone on Sesame Street is preparing to celebrate New Year's Eve as they all go "Around the Corner" to hold the party.

=== New locations ===
- 10 Sesame Street: is a two-story building. The lower floor is occupied by Finders Keepers, a thrift shop full of objects from fairy tales and nursery rhymes, owned by Ruthie. The top floor contains a dance studio owned by dance teacher Celina.
- 456 Sesame Street: is a brownstone that houses the Day Care Center, operated by Angel and later Gina.
- The Furry Arms Hotel: is a Muppet hotel owned by Sherry Netherland, with her employees Humphrey, Ingrid, Benny Rabbit, Otis the Elephant Elevator Operator, and a Dinger.
- The Birdland Jazz Club: which featured live music hosted by Hoots the Owl.
- The Park: has a jungle gym and a pond. The Squirrelles live in a tree there.
- A Subway Station.
- A newsstand: run by Oscar.

== See also ==
- History of Sesame Street
- Sesame Street characters
