= Snuffy's Parents Get a Divorce =

Unreleased episode of Sesame Street

- Sesame Street episode
- Mr. Snuffleupagus (left), with his sister Alice Snuffleupagus (middle) and his mom Sally Snuffleupagus (right)
- Episode no.: Season 23; Episode 19
- Written by: Norman Stiles
- Production code: 2985
- Original air date: Unaired

"Snuffy's Parents Get a Divorce" is the name of an episode on the children's television program Sesame Street. Produced in 1992, it never aired because tests revealed several unintended negative effects. Sesame Street has a history of addressing difficult topics as part of its affective curriculum goals, including death, marriage, childbirth, and disaster. Extensive research was conducted before these episodes were written and produced to determine their focus, and after they aired, to analyze their impact on viewers. This was the case for "Snuffy's Parents Get a Divorce." The show's producers had expressed a desire to produce the episode as early as 1989, and they were convinced it was a topic they should address after the U.S. Census Bureau reported that 40% of American children had experienced divorce.

The producers chose to present the Muppet, Mr. Snuffleupagus ("Snuffy"), and his family's experience of divorce. The episode was written by staff writer Norman Stiles, who also wrote the 1983 episode in which Mr. Hooper's death was explained. The episode was reviewed by the Children's Television Workshop's (CTW) advisory board, content experts, and developmental psychologists. After tests showed that their young viewers were confused by the episode and did not understand important concepts about divorce, the producers decided not to air it, despite the investment they had made. This marks the only time the show's producers made this kind of decision, and was cited as an example of the producers' practice of "listening to the voices of children and by putting their needs first", despite the costs.

Sesame Street did not address the topic of divorce until November 2012, when the production team produced a video for limited audiences titled Little Children, Big Challenges: Divorce as part of their resiliency initiative.

== Background ==
Sesame Street, which premiered in 1969, was the first children's television program to use a detailed, comprehensive curriculum with specific educational goals. The show's goals included both cognitive and affective objectives. Initially, the cognitive skills of its young viewers were prioritized over affective skills, which were addressed indirectly because the producers, writers, and researchers believed that focusing on cognitive skills would increase children's self-esteem and feelings of competency. Eventually, after the show's first season, its critics forced the staff to address affective goals more overtly, following "extensive research and planning".

According to writer Michael Davis, Sesame Street's curriculum began addressing affective goals more overtly during the 1980s. For example, the producers addressed grief after the 1982 death of Will Lee, who had played Mr. Hooper since the show's premiere. (Note: For a description of this episode, see Borgenicht, p. 42, and Davis, pp. 281–285.) Author David Borgenicht called the Mr. Hooper episode "poignant", and Davis called it "a landmark broadcast" and "a truly memorable episode, one of the show's best". For the 1988 and 1989 seasons, the show's staff addressed the themes of love, marriage, and childbirth by creating a storyline in which the characters Luis and Maria fall in love, marry, and have a child, Gabi. Extensive research was conducted before these episodes were written and produced to ascertain their focus, and after they aired to analyze their effect on viewers. (Note: See Truglio et al., pp. 74–76, for a more detailed discussion. Also see Davis, pp. 293–294, for a description of the wedding episode, written by Jeff Moss, and Borgenicht, pp. 80–81, for descriptions of the wedding and of Gabi's birth.) The show also addressed real-life disasters. For example, the producers addressed the September 11 terrorist attacks with an episode that aired in early 2002. They also produced a four-episode series that aired after Hurricane Katrina in 2005.

== Development ==
The Children's Television Workshop (CTW, later Sesame Workshop), the organization responsible for producing Sesame Street, considered and discussed addressing the topic of divorce for many years before developing an episode. As early as 1989, writer and director Jon Stone expressed his intention of writing a script about it, stating, "My two projects for this year are drugs and divorce. Divorce is a difficult one. Perhaps we could do it with puppets. I am also writing a script on drugs and peer pressure". Executive producer Dulcy Singer vetoed the idea in 1990, before it reached development. While she felt complex social matters should be discussed on the series, she felt the issue was irrelevant to inner-city and financially disadvantaged families, which was the show's target audience. She said that "divorce is a middle-class thing," and suggested instead that an episode focus on a single-parent family, with the child born out of wedlock with an absent father. Singer stated, even after the episode was filmed, "We were really nervous about the show, and we didn't think it was a shoo-in. When you're dealing with something like death, the approach can be universal. But with divorce, it's so personal. People react differently". The topic of divorce was discussed again the following year, after the U.S. Census Bureau released statistics suggesting 40 percent of all children in the United States, not just the middle classes, would soon live in divorced households.

Instead of using the human characters in the show's cast, the writers and producers decided to use Muppets to present their narrative about the effects of divorce on young children. They chose to feature the family of Mr. Snuffleupagus ("Snuffy"), a large Muppet who had been on the show since 1971. Long-time cast member Bob McGrath stated, "They knew they couldn't do it with either of our married couples—Gordon and Susan or Maria and Luis—so they tried it with Snuffleupagus, writing a show about his parents getting divorced". According to producer/director Lisa Simon, "With puppets, it's slightly less frightening... The kids have somebody to identify with. They see the puppet characters have feelings and work through a difficult issue many of them will have to face". Simon stated, regarding the difficulty the producers and writers had in crafting the episode, "We hope to get to it by the end of the season. It always takes us a while to figure out how to do an issue appropriately, from a child's point of view". Puppeteer Jerry Nelson, who was one of the original performers of Snuffy, noted, "Now we delve into things like divorce that are likely to affect small children very heavily. We didn't touch those things before".

Staff writer Norman Stiles, who also wrote the episode in which Mr. Hooper's death was explained, was assigned to compose the script. The episode was reviewed by CTW's advisory board, content experts, and developmental psychologists. The episode featured Gordon explaining the concept of divorce, Snuffy being assured that his parents still loved him, and the characters talking and singing "about how Snuffy will have good homes, and so on and so on".

== Reception ==
As with the Mr. Hooper episode, "Snuffy's Parents Get a Divorce" was studied extensively for comprehension and attention. After filming, it was screened before a test audience of 60 children in four daycare centers. The results found several unintended negative effects. As The Christian Science Monitor said, "it bombed". Despite Gordon's reassuring the Muppets Elmo, Big Bird, and Telly, children believed that their parents' arguments would lead to divorce and did not understand that arguing is a normal part of marriage. They were also unsure that Snuffy and his little sister Alice's parents loved them despite the divorce, and were unclear where the characters' parents lived (especially their father, who had never appeared on the show before). Many viewers also thought that Snuffy and Alice would never see their father again. According to Singer, "The kids came away with negative messages... The kids misunderstood arguments. They said arguments did mean divorce. Some thought Snuffy's parents were moving away even though we said just the opposite. A number said the parents would no longer be in love with them".

Based on their findings, and despite the expense and their intention to air "Snuffy's Parents Get a Divorce" in April 1992, the CTW decided not to risk harming their audience and not air the episode. McGrath said, "They wrote a whole show and taped it, and it was just devastating for test groups of kids. So they just threw the whole thing in the garbage and never tried it again. It was just too difficult a concept for a 3-year-old". CTW Research director Valeria Lovelace recommended scrapping the episode and going "back to the drawing board", and the idea was abandoned, at least for the season. Producer Michael Loman recalled, "We ate the cost and never aired it. We feel there are a range of issues that we can deal with in the family that do not go to the extreme of divorce". According to Sesame Street researcher Susan Scheiner, it was the first time the CTW had produced an episode, and after making a large investment, they found in tests that the episode did not work. Rosemarie T. Truglio and her colleagues at the CTW cited the episode as an example of the CTW's practice of "listening to the voices of children and by putting their needs first." The show did not make a tape of the segment available, but provided the media with a copy of the script.

== Legacy ==
Sesame Street did not address the subject of divorce until November 2012, when its producers created, as part of their resiliency initiative, Little Children, Big Challenges: Divorce. It was made available to military families and to the general public through family courts, counseling services, and parenting and child care programs. It included a 22-minute DVD, a caregiver guide, a storybook, a tip sheet for extended families and friends, mobile apps and social networking sites, and an online toolkit. Like in "Snuffy's Parents Get a Divorce", the Little Children, Big Challenges production also used a Muppet, Abby Cadabby, to represent the child experiencing divorce. Whereas Snuffy was shown going through it in real time, Abby's parents' divorce was in the past, which gave her time to adjust.

In November 2019, footage from the episode was featured in an exhibit at the Museum of the Moving Image near the studios where Sesame Street was recorded and screened for the public. Some footage from the episode aired during the 2019 documentary, Sesame Street: 50 Years of Sunny Days, on ABC.

== Works cited ==
- Borgenicht, David (1998). Sesame Street Unpaved. New York: Hyperion Publishing. ISBN 0-7868-6460-5.
- Davis, Michael (2008). Street Gang: The Complete History of Sesame Street. New York: Viking Penguin. ISBN 978-0-670-01996-0.
- Gikow, Louise A. (2009). Sesame Street: A Celebration— Forty Years of Life on the Street. New York: Black Dog & Leventhal Publishers. ISBN 978-1-57912-638-4.
- Morrow, Robert W. (2006). Sesame Street and the Reform of Children's Television. Baltimore, Maryland: Johns Hopkins University Press. ISBN 0-8018-8230-3.
- Truglio, Rosemary T.; Lovelace, Valeria O.; Sequi, Ivelisse; Scheiner, Susan (2001). "The Varied Role of Formative Research: Case Studies from 30 Years". In Fisch, Shalom M.; Truglio, Rosemarie T. (eds.). "G" is for Growing: Thirty Years of Research on Children and Sesame Street. Mahweh, New Jersey: Lawrence Erlbaum Publishers. pp. 61–82. ISBN 0-8058-3395-1.
