= Format of Sesame Street =

Children's television show

Sesame Street is an American children's television series that is known for its use of format and structure to convey educational concepts to its preschool audience, and to help them prepare for school. It utilizes the conventions of television such as music, humor, sustained action, and a strong visual style, and combines Jim Henson's Muppets, animation, short films, humor, and cultural references. The show, which premiered in 1969, was the first to base its contents, format, and production values on laboratory and formative research. According to researchers, it was also the first to include a curriculum "detailed or stated in terms of measurable outcomes".

The format of Sesame Street consisted of a combination of commercial television production elements and educational techniques. It was the first time a more realistic setting, an inner city street and neighborhood, was used for a children's program. At first, each episode was structured like a magazine, but in 1998, as a result of changes in their audience and its viewing habits, the producers researched the reasons for its lower ratings, and changed the show's structure to a more narrative format. The popular, fifteen-minute long segment, "Elmo's World", hosted by the Muppet Elmo, was added in 1998 to make the show more accessible to a younger audience. The producers of Sesame Street expanded the new format to the entire show in 2002. The format changed as the target audience did; by 2002 its main viewers were around two years old, while back in the 1960s the intended audiences were aged three through five.

Beginning in 2025, Sesame Street has transitioned to a more narrative-driven format, which also introduced a new animated interstitial series, Tales from 123.

== Original format ==
The producers of Sesame Street, which premiered in 1969, used elements of commercial television such as music, humor, sustained action, and a strong visual style, in structuring the format of the show. They also used animation and live-action short films. The show's staff produced segments filmed in-studio with their human and Muppet cast and they contracted out the animations and short films (Note: For Sesame Street, "films" meant segments that depicted humans or real animals instead of animated characters. Morrow reported that films depicting animals were more popular than the ones with humans.) to independent producers. (Note: Animations made up 37 percent of an episode, films made up 17 percent, and Muppet segments 20 percent.) Co-creator Joan Ganz Cooney was the first to suggest that they use commercial-like 12–90-second shorts that consistently repeated several key concepts throughout an episode. Like other commercial sponsors, the narrator announced at the end of an episode that it was presented by the letters appearing in the commercials. The studio segments were written to concentrate on the African-American child, a key component of the show's audience.

With all its raucousness and slapstick humor, Sesame Street became a sweet show, and its staff maintains that there is nothing wrong in that.

— Sesame Street researcher Gerald S. Lesser

The show's producers and writers decided to build the new show around a brownstone on an inner-city street, a choice writer Michael Davis called "unprecedented". They reproduced their viewers' neighborhoods—as writer Cary O'Dell described it, "a realistic city street, complete with peeling paint, alleys, front stoops, and metal trash cans along the sidewalk". Director Jon Stone was convinced that in order for inner-city children to relate to Sesame Street, the show had to be set in a familiar place. (Note: The set has changed many times during its history to better reflect the changing experiences of the show's young viewers.) Despite its urban setting, the producers depicted the world in a positive way—both realistically and as it could be. They attempted to present "an idealized world of learning and play", and from a child's perspective. Director Jim Martin called Sesame Street "an urban show kids could relate to" and "a reality show with a sprinkling of fantasy".

When Sesame Street was developed, most researchers assumed that young children did not have long attention spans, so the new show's producers were concerned that an hour-long show would not hold their audience's attention. As a result, each episode was structured like a magazine, which made it possible for the producers to create a mixture of styles, paces, and characters. The structure allowed them to have flexibility, meaning that segments were dropped, modified, or added without affecting the rest of the show. As Lesser stated, "It is unlikely that any other approach would have provided enough room to present material on the wide range of goals we had selected". Producers found that if the show's segments were sufficiently varied in character, content, style, pace, and mood, children's attention was able to be sustained throughout each episode. The show's magazine format accommodated both the curriculum and its demanding production schedule.

=== "Street scenes" ===
At first, the show's "street scenes", which referred to the action taking place on the brownstone set, were not story-based. Instead, they consisted of individual segments connected to the curriculum and interrupted by inserts, or puppet skits, short films, and animations. By 1990, research had shown that children were able to follow a story, so the street scenes were changed to depict storylines. The writers presented a story, separated by several inserts, dispersed throughout the hour-long show. Although the stories were usually about 10–12 minutes in length, it would take 45 minutes to tell them. (Note: When 130 episodes were made each season, about 2,400 segments had to be produced.) According to writer Tony Geiss, the addition of storylines changed the nature of the show.

During Sesame Street's development in 1968, the producers followed the recommendation of child psychologists, who advised them to not allow the direct interaction of the human actors and Muppets because the experts were concerned it would confuse and mislead young children. Shortly before the show's premiere, the producers created five one-hour episodes so that they could test if children found them comprehensible and appealing. They were never intended for broadcast, but were presented to preschoolers in 60 homes throughout Philadelphia in July 1969. The producers found that the results were "generally very positive". However, children attended to the shows during the Muppet segments, but their interest was lost during the street scenes, which featured only humans and were considered "the glue" that "pulled the show together". The appeal of the test episodes was lower than they preferred, so the producers re-shot the street segments. Henson and his team created Muppets that could interact with the human actors; specifically, as the show's researchers put it, "two of Sesame Street's most enduring Muppets: Oscar the Grouch and Big Bird". The test episodes were responsible for what writer Malcolm Gladwell called "the essence of Sesame Street—the artful blend of fluffy monsters and earnest adults". CTW researcher Gerald Lesser called the producers' decision to defy the recommendations of their advisers "a turning point in the history of Sesame Street".

=== Animation, films, and other media ===
Animation was another important aspect of the structure of Sesame Street. Lesser stated that one of the purposes of animation was to create incongruity, or what he called "illogical surprises". The first piece of animation commissioned by the CTW for Sesame Street was "the J commercial", in 1968, which they used in a study about its effectiveness in daycare centers in New York City. The CTW found that it was an effective tool in teaching children letters and numbers and that it effectively attracted children's attention. It also provided evidence, as writer Robert W. Morrow reported, that children were able to "endure enormous amounts of repetition". According to Morrow, the CTW's generalization from this study, which was later supported by outside studies, was that although repetition was an effective teaching method, repeated exposure "determined instructional effectiveness". "The J commercial" was a part of CTW's promotional film about Sesame Street and was used to demonstrate its teaching style to the press. (Note: See Morrow, pp. 89–91, for his description of "the J commercial".)

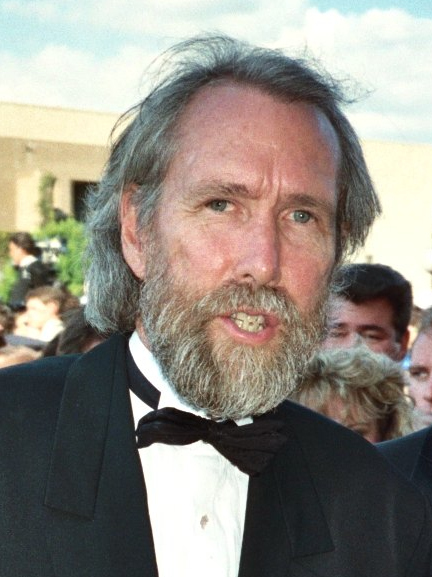
Jim Henson, (1989), creator of the Muppets. Henson created and produced many of the animation and short films shown on Sesame Street.

Sesame Street's animations and live-action films were usually commissioned to outside studios. For example, Misseri Studio in Florence, Italy provided animations for the show for its entire run. Many animations, as well as the show's live-action films and longer segments like Elmo's World were created to accompany specific episodes, and became part of its library of shorts available for use in later episodes. Other films and animations were created as regular, recurring, and stand-alone segments. Gikow reported, "Virtually all animators and filmmakers supplying the show cite the enormous freedom given by producers, calling it a liberating force that let creativity explode on screen".

CTW's first producer responsible for the show's animation and live-action shorts was Lu Horne. His successor, Edith Zornow, was interested in what Gikow called "emerging talent", and as a result, the show worked with, as Gikow also stated, "animators and filmmakers on the cusp of fame". Animators who created pieces for Sesame Street included Bud Luckey, Jeffrey Hale, Ernie Fosselius, and others who went on to work at Pixar. Jim Henson was one of the many producers who created short films for the show.

As Gikow stated, "The expansion of the Sesame Street brand into films, videos, and television specials was a natural". There have been two full-length films produced: Sesame Street Presents: Follow That Bird (1985) and The Adventures of Elmo in Grouchland (1999). In early 2019, it was announced that a third film, a musical co-starring Anne Hathaway and written and directed by Jonathan Krisel, would be produced. Starting in 1978 with Christmas Eve on Sesame Street, there have been several television specials, and the Sesame Street Muppets have made several appearances on other programs throughout the years. Home videos, which emphasized specific curriculum goals, began to be produced in 1985.

By 2009, Sesame Workshop started a new website containing a large library of classic and more recent free video clips, as well as a series of podcasts. In 2014, PBS began to stream full-length episodes on its website, mobile app, and Roku channel. Also in 2014, the SW began an online streaming subscription service called Sesame Go, which aired both old and new episodes of the show. (Note: A year later, in the wake of the SW's deal with HBO in 2015, the SW began phasing out its subscription service.) By 2019, Sesame Street has produced over 4,500 episodes, 35 TV specials, 200 home videos, and 180 albums. Its YouTube channel had almost 5 million subscribers, and the show had 24 million followers on social media.

== Format changes after the 1990s ==
Sesame Street's format remained intact until the 1990s. By then, the show was faced with heavy competition from other preschool television programs such as Barney & Friends and Blue's Clues, which caused its ratings to decline. New research, the growth of the children's home video industry, and the increase of 30-minute children's shows on cable demonstrated that the traditional magazine-format was not necessarily the most effective way to hold young viewers' attention. For Sesame Street's 30th anniversary in 1999, its producers researched the reasons for the show's lower ratings. For the first time since the show debuted, the producers and a team of researchers analyzed Sesame Street's content and structure during a series of two-week-long workshops. They also studied how children's viewing habits had changed and become more sophisticated in thirty years. They found that although the show was produced for 3-to-5-year-olds, children began watching it at a younger age. As a result, the target age for Sesame Street shifted downward, from 4 years to 3 years. By 2002, the main bloc of viewers was aged two.

In 1998, a new 15-minute-long segment, created and developed by writers Judy Freudberg and Tony Geiss, that targeted the show's younger viewers and had a different format than the rest of the show, began to be shown at the end of each episode. The segment, called "Elmo's World", used traditional elements (animation, Muppets, music, and live-action film), but had a more sustained narrative, followed the same structure each episode, and depended heavily on repetition. Unlike the realism of the rest of the show, "Elmo's World" took place in a stylized crayon-drawn universe as conceived by its host. Elmo, who represented the younger audience, was chosen as the host of the closing segment because younger toddlers identified with him and because he had always tested well with them. (Note: At first, the same segment was repeated daily for a week, but this practice was dropped at the end of the first season of "Elmo's World".)

In 2002, Sesame Street's producers went further in changing the show to reflect its younger audience and the increase in their viewers' sophistication. They expanded the "Elmo's World" concept by, as San Francisco Chronicle TV critic Tim Goodman called it, "deconstructing" the show. They changed the structure of the entire show from its original 'magazine' format to a more narrative format, which made the show easier for young children to navigate. Arlene Sherman, a co-executive producer for 25 years, called the show's new look "startlingly different".

"Elmo's World" stopped production in 2009, when the producers of Sesame Street began taking steps to increase the age of their viewers and to increase the show's ratings, and because the show's curriculum was not designed for a younger audience. A new format where Murray Monster introduces segments somewhat in a manner that resembles typical children's television programming blocks at the time was introduced during the show's 40th anniversary. They were successful; by the end of the show's 40th anniversary in 2009–10, 3-year-old viewers had increased by 41 percent, 4-year-olds by 4 percent, and 5-year-olds by 21 percent. In 2012, "Elmo's World" was replaced by "Elmo the Musical"; even though it was designed for older viewers, the producers hoped that younger children would still enjoy it. "Elmo's World" segments continued to appear in repeats, DVDs, and on the show's website. In 2016, the 46th season of Sesame Street began airing on the cable subscription service HBO, and in the following season in 2017, Elmo's World returned, in a newly designed segment that ran five minutes at the end of each episode. Steve Youngwood, the Sesame Workshop's CEO, called it "fresh, contemporary". Also in 2016 and 2017, in response to the changing viewing habits of toddlers at this time, the show's producers decreased its length from one hour to thirty minutes, focused on fewer characters but dropped most of the original human cast members that had been a part of the show since its initial launch in 1969, removed the pop culture references "once included as winks for their parents", and focused "on a single backbone topic".

Starting with Season 56 in 2025, Sesame Street lengthened its story segments from nine to 11 minutes and introduced a new animated series, Tales from 123.

== See also ==
- Educational goals of Sesame Street
- History of Sesame Street
- Sesame Street research

== Works cited ==
- Clash, Kevin and Gary Brozek & Louis Henry Mitchell (2006). My Life as a Furry Red Monster: What Being Elmo Has Taught Me About Life, Love and Laughing Out Loud. New York: Random House. ISBN 0-7679-2375-8
- Davis, Michael (2008). Street Gang: The Complete History of Sesame Street. New York: Viking Press. ISBN 978-0-670-01996-0
- Fisch, Shalom M. and Rosemarie T. Truglio, eds. (2001). "G" Is for Growing: Thirty Years of Research on Children and Sesame Street. Mahweh, New Jersey: Lawrence Erlbaum Publishers. ISBN 0-8058-3395-1
  - Palmer, Edward and Shalom M. Fisch, "The Beginnings of Sesame Street Research", pp. 3–24.
  - Fisch, Shalom M. and Lewis Bernstein, "Formative Research Revealed: Methodological and Process Issues in Formative Research", pp. 39–60.
- Gikow, Louise A. (2009). Sesame Street: A Celebration of Forty Years of Life on the Street. New York: Black Dog & Leventhal Publishers. ISBN 978-1-57912-638-4.
- Gladwell, Malcolm (2000). The Tipping Point: How Little Things Can Make a Big Difference. New York: Little, Brown, and Company. ISBN 0-316-31696-2
- Lesser, Gerald S. (1974). Children and Television: Lessons From Sesame Street. New York: Vintage Books. ISBN 0-394-71448-2
- Morrow, Robert W. (2006). Sesame Street and the Reform of Children's Television. Baltimore, Maryland: Johns Hopkins University Press. ISBN 0-8018-8230-3
- O'Dell, Cary (1997). Women Pioneers in Television: Biographies of Fifteen Industry Leaders. Jefferson, NC: McFarland & Company. ISBN 0-7864-0167-2
