= Mr. Hooper =

Sesame Street character

Harold Hooper
- Sesame Street character
- Mr. Hooper in his store
- First appearance: Gordon introduces Sally to Sesame Street (November 10, 1969)
- Last appearance: Slimey's hot dog stand (March 18, 1983)
- Portrayed by: Will Lee

In-universe information
- Aliases: Mr. Hooper (often mispronounced by Big Bird as "Cooper", "Looper", etc.)
- Species: Human
- Gender: Male

Mr. Harold Hooper is a character on the television series Sesame Street portrayed by Will Lee. He was one of the series's first four human characters. Created by producer and writer Jon Stone, Mr. Hooper is the original proprietor of Hooper's Store, the neighborhood variety store and diner that serves as a place for Muppets and humans to meet and interact. He ranked first among the show's human characters in recognition by young viewers. Mr. Hooper, who has been described as "slightly cranky but good-hearted" and "curmudgeonly", bridges the gap between the older generation and its young audience. Hooper's Store, "an idealized social institution", is an extension of his personality. He had a close relationship with the Muppet Big Bird.

After Lee died in 1982, the writers and producers of Sesame Street made the landmark decision to have the character of Mr. Hooper die alongside him. Aided by child development experts, they created an episode in which Big Bird learns about Mr. Hooper's death and is helped through his grief by his friends. The episode, which aired on Thanksgiving Day in 1983, set the standard for dealing with difficult topics on children's television and remains a pivotal moment in the show's history.

== Development and description ==
Mr. Hooper, played by Will Lee from the premiere of Sesame Street in 1969 until his death in 1982, was one of the first four human characters on the show. Created by producer and writer Jon Stone, the role of Mr. Hooper was the first to be cast. Lee came to Stone's attention through writers Bruce Hart and Carole Hart. Mr. Hooper was inspired by Captain Kangaroo, for which Stone had worked and which greatly influenced him as he developed Sesame Street. Mr. Hooper is the original proprietor of Hooper's Store, the neighborhood variety store and diner that serves as a place for Muppets and humans to meet and interact. Stone's original conception of Mr. Hooper was that he would be, like most owners of such establishments at the time, older, male, and Jewish.

I was delighted to take the role of Mr. Hooper, the gruff grocer with the warm heart. It's a big part, and it allows a lot of latitude. But the show has something extra—that sense that you sometimes get from great theater, the feeling that its influence never stops.

— Will Lee to Time in 1970

Lee was a character actor and acting instructor with a range of roles in the theater. He had been blacklisted from many mainstream acting roles for about five years during the McCarthy era for refusing to cooperate with the House Un-American Activities Committee's investigation of Communist influence in show business. According to writer Michael Davis, Lee played Mr. Hooper, known for his bowtie and horn-rimmed glasses, "with such certainty and naturalness he made adults suspend their sense of disbelief". Writer Louise A. Gikow said that Lee was "perfectly cast" as Mr. Hooper. According to cast member Bob McGrath, who also appeared in Sesame Street's first episode with Lee, "Will had a broader dimension to his character than perhaps the rest of us did ... He convinced me that no matter how simple the scene was with a child, you had to bring a tremendous integrity and an honesty and credibility to it". Joan Ganz Cooney, Sesame Street co-creator and president of the Children's Television Workshop (CTW), said, "He gave millions of children the message that the old and the young have a lot to say to each other". The New York Times reported that Mr. Hooper ranked first among the show's human characters in recognition by young viewers.

Davis described Mr. Hooper as "slightly cranky but good-hearted". Gikow called him "curmudgeonly". Davis said that since Mr. Hooper's appearance in the first episode of Sesame Street, he had become many things to many young children, "the guy in the apron at the far side of the generation gap, his half-lens glasses slipping down his nose". Davis also said that Hooper's Store, which he called "an idealized social institution", is an extension of Mr. Hooper's personality. Mr. Hooper has a special relationship with Big Bird, who often came into Hooper's Store for a birdseed milkshake and a chat. A running gag in the show was that Big Bird often mispronounced Mr. Hooper's name, although most attempts ended in "ooper", such as "Looper" or "Cooper". Mr. Hooper's first name, Harold, was not revealed until the character earned a GED during night school.

Mr. Hooper's last appearances on Sesame Street aired in 1983, but were taped in November 1982. Lee participated in the Macy's Thanksgiving Day Parade with other Sesame Street characters a few days before he died of a heart attack on December 7, 1982.

== Death of Mr. Hooper ==
The producers of Sesame Street considered several ways to proceed after Lee's death, including writing around Lee's death and dropping him from the show without explanation. They also considered recasting the character or saying he could retire, or even move to Florida. Ultimately, they decided to have the character die as well, using episode #1839 to teach their audience about the difficult topic of death. According to CTW researcher Rosemarie Truglio and her colleagues, death is one of many social issues relevant to preschoolers the show has dealt with. Executive producer Dulcy Singer said they followed their instincts to be "honest and straightforward" and to "deal with it head-on".

=== Synopsis ===
In the episode, Big Bird presents his adult friends with pictures he has drawn of each of them. When he reaches his picture of Mr. Hooper, Maria tells him that Mr. Hooper has died. Initially, Big Bird believes that Mr. Hooper will return, prompting Susan to explain the finality of death. David reveals that Mr. Hooper bequeathed the store to him in his will, and Olivia reassures Big Bird that they still have their memories of Mr. Hooper from when he was alive. Overcome with confusion and sadness, Big Bird demands an explanation for Mr. Hooper's death, to which Gordon replies, "It has to be this way... because." The episode ends with Big Bird hanging the picture near his nest.

=== Research ===
As it had done with other social issues and in developing their curriculum, the CTW researched the topic of death and how preschoolers understand it. The first step in the process was to assemble a team of experts, led by CTW research director Lewis Bernstein, in child psychology, child development, and religion. The team advised the show's writers and producers how to handle the topic, in what they called "a curriculum bath". Bernstein described it in this way: "We bring in the experts to allow the writer to soak in expertise. We in Research bring in people to provide the information, and then the artistry of the writer takes over, as they integrate what they've heard". The experts advised the producers to provide their viewers with a sense of closure about Mr. Hooper's death. They decided not to focus on how Mr. Hooper died, since explaining that he was old and ill might increase children's fears about death. They chose to deal with his death in a single episode, and convey simple messages like: "Mr. Hooper is dead; Mr. Hooper will not be coming back; and Mr. Hooper will be missed by all". Gikow said the episode they created was an example of the writers and producers' skills as educators as well as entertainers.

The CTW conducted a series of studies to guide the writers and producers in creating the episode. The goal was to answer four key questions: (1) Will children understand the messages they wanted to convey about death? (2) How attentive will they be to the storyline? (3) How will parents respond to the treatment of such a sensitive topic? and (4) Will children be disturbed by the messages, and if so, for how long? The researchers broke up children into three groups: children who watched only the scenes in which the storyline was played out and were interviewed afterward; children who watched the entire episode and whose attention was recorded while they viewed it; and children who watched the episode without the inserts, with their parents, who were interviewed 9 or 10 days later.

The researchers found that 73% of 4- and 5-year-olds in their study understood that Mr. Hooper was dead and that 88% of this group understood that he was not coming back, although only about one-fourth of the 3-year-old viewers responded correctly. Most of the 4- and 5-year-olds understood that Big Bird and the adults were sad. Most children (80%) were attentive during the episode. The parents interviewed had "overwhelmingly positive" reactions to the show, and half reported that they had discussed death with their children after viewing it. None of the parents reported negative reactions from their children, either immediately after watching the episode or later.

=== Development and legacy ===
The script Norman [Stiles] wrote became an extraordinary moving television experience for preschoolers and their families. Heartbreaking yet affirming, the episode set a standard for the sensitive treatment of a powerful subject matter than has rarely been equaled. It remains one of the show's proudest moments.

— Louise A. Gikow, writer

Sesame Street head writer Norman Stiles was chosen to write the segments about Mr. Hooper's death. The episode focused on the cycle of birth and death by also mentioning the birth of a baby, and by remembering Mr. Hooper. Stiles said, "We decided to say that while Mr. Hooper was not here anymore, we will always have that part of him that lives within the heart, that we have our love and that it will always stay". Stiles wanted to convey that expressing grief for someone who had died is difficult for both adults and children. Instead of providing an explanation, the adults of Sesame Street tell Big Bird, when he asks why Mr. Hooper died, that there was no real reason, that it happened, as Gordon says, "just because". The show's outside experts advised Stiles and the producers to remove the line because they were concerned that an open-ended explanation would not satisfy children, but Stiles kept the line because it was an acknowledgment, as Gikow said, that there is "never a good explanation" of why people die.

The episode aired on Thanksgiving Day 1983, a year after Lee's final appearance as Mr. Hooper in the Macy's Thanksgiving Day parade. The producers chose to air it during the first week of the new season in order to explain Mr. Hooper's absence as soon as possible, for maximum exposure, and to ensure that parents were at home with their children to discuss it. The illustrations used for the episode were drawn by Caroll Spinney, who played Big Bird. Mr. Hooper's picture remained on the set from then on, as a continuing memorial to Lee and Mr. Hooper. Of the scene in which the pictures were passed out, Spinney said, "When we finished that scene there wasn't one of us whose face wasn't streaked with tears", including Spinney under his costume. Jon Stone, who directed the episode, wanted to do another take, but Spinney later said, "There was nothing wrong with that take. It was perfect." Cameraman Frankie Biondo was touched by the performance.

The book I'll Miss You, Mr. Hooper, based on the episode's script, was published in 1984. It is also written by Stiles. According to Renée Cherow-O'Leary, Stiles and the editorial staff of the CTW's book division worked with the show's research staff and used the same educational content information and research the show's producers used to create the episode.

== See also ==
- History of Sesame Street
- Educational goals of Sesame Street
- Sesame Street research
- Format of Sesame Street
