= Sesame Street Magazine =

American magazine

- Cover of the first issue, published in 1970
- Editor-in-chief: Rebecca Herman
- Staff writers: Beth Sharkey
- Categories: Children's literature
- Frequency: Monthly
- Publisher: Sesame Workshop
- Total circulation (2006): 650,000
- First issue: October 1970
- Company: The Parenting Group
- Based in: New York City
- Language: English
- ISSN: 0049-0253

Sesame Street Magazine is an American monthly magazine based on the children's television series Sesame Street. The magazine features characters from the television series, and emphasizes Sesame Street's educational goals. The intended audience includes children under the age of five and their parents.

Sesame Workshop (formerly called the Children's Television Workshop) published the magazine from October 1970 to 2001. The Parenting Group then assumed publication, and until 2008 distributed it optionally to subscribers of Parenting. Since 2008 the Parenting Group has distributed Sesame Street Magazine electronically and without charge. The Parents' Choice Foundation commended Sesame Street Magazine with the Parents' Choice Award on 18 occasions between 1970 and 2007.

== Features ==
In 1985, publisher Nina Link decided to incorporate a parents' guide into the magazine. However, the concept developed into a companion magazine called the Sesame Street Parents' Guide. The intent of the supplement was to explain the themes of each issue to parents so that they understand what their children can learn from the magazine. Subscribers received both publications. While Sesame Street Magazine did not carry third-party advertising, the Parents' Guide did.

Both the parent magazine and the children's magazine are meant to complement the show. Every year, Children's Television Workshop developed new curriculum goals to apply to both the show and the magazine. For example, if the show addressed issues about the environment, the magazine did too.

According to the guidelines laid out by Nina Link, publisher of the magazine from 1978 to 1999, and Renée Cherow-O’Leary, Director of Research for the Magazine Group of the Children's Television workshop from 1989 to 1995:

Sesame Street Magazine is designed to be a child's first magazine. It seeks to encourage the development of literacy, inquisitiveness, and social skills. Each issue is organized around a central theme. One month it might be a concept such as number, color, or shape recognition; another month it might be a psychological theme such as a child's need for self-esteem. The magazine has regular departments and features in which many familiar Sesame Street television characters (e.g., Big Bird, Grover, and the Cookie Monster) appear. In addition, photo essays cover real-life issues, such as what it is like to have a pet, use a wheelchair, or visit the library."

The purpose of the magazine is to foster skills in pre-reading, writing, mathematics, and socialization. Just as the effect of the Sesame Street television show on children was continually evaluated in laboratory settings, the magazine issues were as well. The goal of Children's Television Workshop is to combine education with entertainment. Thus, just like in the show, the magazine features stories centered around such characters as Big Bird and Cookie Monster, as well as engaging colors.

According to the guidelines laid out by Nina Link and Renee Cherow-O'Leery, the aim of the Sesame Street Parent's Guide was as follows:

It is to help parents better understand the changing needs of their preschool children. The magazine offers practical parenting advice and features articles on health, safety, nutrition, and the latest research on child development. A regular department,"Extending This Issue," gives parents suggestions on how to use the accompanying Sesame Street Magazine to expand their child's learning potential.

== Circulation and pricing ==
In 1981, circulation was at 1,125,000, including 375,000 sold at newsstands and checkout counters. Subscription price was $6.95 for one year and newsstand price was 75 cents. One year subscription included 10 issues per year.

In 1990, the magazine's circulation was at a high of 1,200,000 million. Subscription price was $14.95 for one year (still 10 issues) and newsstand price was $1.50. Subscriptions at this time included the Parent's Guide, but the guide was not sold in newsstands. Another 51,000 copies of the two magazines were sent free by the publisher to pediatricians' offices.

In 1999, the magazine's paid circulation for the first six months of the year (January 1 to June 30) was 1,148,432 with an additional unpaid circulation of 16,224, according to Audit Bureau of Circulations and BPA International figures.

In 2000, the magazine's circulation numbers dropped by 2.9 percent when compared to the 1999 circulation numbers. According to Audit Bureau of Circulation figures, the magazine's paid circulation was 1,111,647 from Jan 1 to June 30.

As of 2006, a subscription of the magazine, ordered through Parenting, is $12.00. This subscription includes 11 issues.

== Use in literacy education ==
The magazine was used to set a curriculum for a preschool in New Brunswick, New Jersey. The preschool centered its literacy program around the themes addressed in the monthly magazine issues and then sent a magazine home with each student at the end of the month. The program was intended to build a connection between the school curriculum and the parents; by sending kids home with a copy of the magazine, they could inform parents on what was being taught. In partnership with the teachers, publisher Nina Link donated copies of each magazine issues to the school.

== Similar magazines ==
- Kid City, created for children ages 6–10 who have outgrown Sesame Street Magazine. It was also produced by Children's Television Workshop and each issue also centers around a theme.
- 3-2-1 Contact, a science-themed magazine based on the Children's Television Workshop show of the same name. Intended for kids ages 8–14.
- Creative Classroom, a magazine that was obtained by Children's Television Workshop in 1990. The magazine is intended for elementary school teachers.

== Trivia ==
- The cover of the first issue, as seen in the infobox, uses the Droste effect.
