= Sesame Street research =

Research carried out for the children's TV shows

In 1969, the children's television show Sesame Street premiered on the National Educational Television network (later succeeded by PBS) in the United States. Unlike earlier children's programming, the show's producers used research and over 1,000 studies and experiments to create the show and test its impact on its young viewers' learning. By the end of the program's first season, Children's Television Workshop (CTW), the organization founded to oversee Sesame Street production, had developed what came to be called "the CTW model": a system of planning, production, and evaluation that combined the expertise of researchers and early childhood educators with that of the program's writers, producers, and directors.

CTW conducted research in two ways: in-house formative research that informed and improved production, and independent summative evaluations conducted by the Educational Testing Service (ETS) during the show's first two seasons to measure the program's educational effectiveness. CTW researchers invented tools to measure young viewers' attention to the program. Based on these findings, the researchers compiled a body of data and the producers changed the show accordingly.

Summative research conducted over the years, including two landmark evaluations in 1970 and 1971, demonstrated that viewing the program had positive effects on young viewers' learning, school readiness, and social skills. Subsequent studies have replicated these findings, such as the effect of the show in countries outside of the U.S., several longitudinal studies, the effects of war and natural disasters on young children, and studies about how the show affected viewers' cognition. CTW researcher Gerald S. Lesser stated in 1974 that early tests conducted on the show (both formative and summative) "suggested that Sesame Street was making strides towards teaching what it had set out to teach".

== Background and development ==
According to author Louise A. Gikow, Sesame Street's use of research to create individual episodes and to test its effect on its young viewers set it apart from other children's programs Co-creator Joan Ganz Cooney called the idea of combining research with television production "positively heretical" because it had never been done before. Before Sesame Street, most television shows aimed at children were locally produced, with hosts who, according to researchers Edward L. Palmer and Shalom M. Fisch, "represented the scope and vision of a single individual" and were often condescending to their audience. Scriptwriters of these shows had no training in education or child development. (Note: Cooney later called the state of children's programming a "wasteland" at the time the show was created, a reference to Federal Communications Commission (FCC) chairman Newton Minow's 1961 speech, in which he called television a "vast wasteland".)

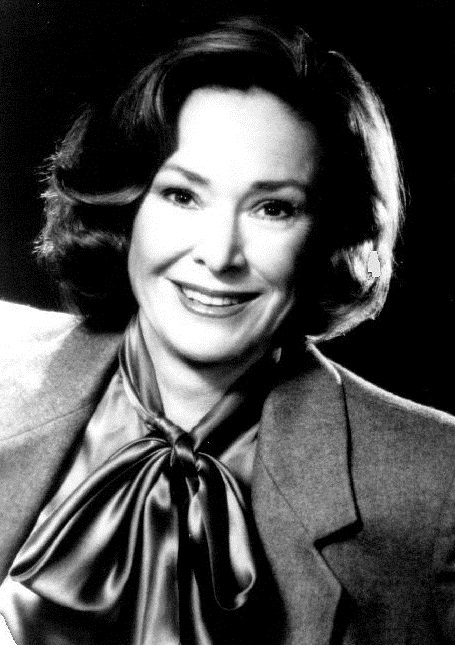
Co-creator Joan Ganz Cooney, 1985

The Carnegie Corporation, one of Sesame Street's first financial backers, hired Cooney, a producer of educational talk shows and documentaries with little experience in education, during the summer of 1967 to visit experts in child development, education, and media across the U.S. and Canada. She researched their ideas about the viewing habits of young children, and wrote a report on her findings entitled "Television for Preschool Education", which described how television could be used as an aid in the education of preschoolers, especially those living in inner cities and became the basis for Sesame Street. Full funding was procured for the production of the new show, and for the creation of the Children's Television Workshop (CTW), the organization responsible for producing it. The show's financial backers, which consisted of the U.S. federal government, the Corporation for Public Broadcasting and the Ford Foundation, insisted on "testing at critical stages to evaluate its ultimate success".

During the summer of 1968, Gerald S. Lesser, CTW's first advisory-board chairman, conducted five three-day curriculum-planning seminars in Boston and New York City (Note: See Lesser, pp. 42–59, for Lesser's lengthy description of the seminars.) to select a curriculum for the new program. Seminar participants were television producers and child development experts. It was the first time a children's television show used a curriculum, which Palmer, who was responsible for conducting the show's formative research, and Fisch described as "detailed or stated in terms of measurable outcomes". The program's creative staff was concerned that this goal would limit creativity, but one of the seminar results was to encourage the show's producers to use child-development concepts in the creative process. Some Muppet characters were created during the seminars to fill specific curriculum needs. For example, Oscar the Grouch was designed to teach children about their positive and negative emotions, and Big Bird was created to provide children with opportunities to correct his "bumbling" mistakes. Lesser reported that Jim Henson had a "particular gift for creating scenes that might teach".

The show's research staff and producers conducted regular internal reviews and seminars to ensure that their curriculum goals were being met and to guide future production. As of 2001, ten seminars had been conducted specifically to address the literacy needs of preschool children. Curriculum seminars prior to Sesame Street's 33rd season in 2002 resulted in a change from the show's magazine-like format to a more narrative format. There have been over 1,000 studies as of 2001 which examine the show's impact on children's learning and attention, although most of these studies were conducted by the CTW and remain unpublished. Educator Herbert A. Sprigle and psychologist Thomas D. Cook conducted two studies during the show's first two seasons that found that the show increased the educational gap between poor and middle-class children, although these studies had little impact on the public discussion about Sesame Street. Another criticism of the show was made by journalist Kay Hymowitz in 1995, who reported that most of the positive research conducted on the show has been done by the CTW, and then sent to a sympathetic press. She claimed that the studies conducted by the CTW "hint at advocacy masquerading as social science", despite the extensive positive studies that had already been conducted independently by the Educational Testing Service in the 1970s.

== The "CTW model" ==
Shortly after beginning Sesame Street, its creators developed the "CTW model": a system of planning, production, and evaluation which only emerged after the show's first season. (Note: See Gikow, 2009, p. 155, for a visual representation of the CTW model.) The CTW model involved the interaction between television producers and educators, the development of a curriculum for 1972 to 1974 children, formative research to shape the program, and independent summative research into what viewers learned. According to Cooney, "Without research, there would be no Sesame Street." Cooney credited Palmer and his colleague at Harvard, Gerald S. Lesser, whom CTW hired to write the program's educational objectives, for bridging the gap between producers and researchers. Cooney stated, about the CTW model: "From the beginning, we—the planners of the project—designed the show as an experimental research project with educational advisers, researchers, and television producers collaborating as equal partners." She described the collaboration as an "arranged marriage". The show's staff worked to create a non-adversarial relationship between producers and researchers; each side contributed, as Fisch stated, "its own unique perspective and expertise". Early in the planning process, production staff recognized that it was valuable to have access to researchers who could analyze children's reactions and help them improve production, and the show's writers and producers brought their instincts for and experience in children's television. Though initially skeptical about both the collaboration and the curriculum, the writers eventually came to see both as integral parts of the creative process.

When educational experts and producers in other countries approached CTW for assistance in producing their own versions of Sesame Street, which became known as "co-productions", a variant of the CTW model was used. The need for preschool education in each country was assessed through research and interviews with television producers, researchers, and educational experts, similar to the process followed in the U.S. The producers then convened a series of meetings with the experts, held in the individual countries, to create and develop a curriculum, the program's educational goals, its set, and its characters. They held meetings, at the CTW offices in New York City and in the respective country, to train the co-production team in the CTW model. Each co-production conducted formative studies before production and if possible, summative studies to test the efficacy of its curriculum.

== Formative research ==
=== Methods ===
Palmer and his team used concepts from the field of formative research, which consisted of in-house, laboratory-oriented research, to guide production and to determine whether the show held children's attention. Palmer, described by Cooney as "a founder of CTW and founder of its research function", was one of the few late-1960s academics studying children's television and its effects on learning. He was responsible for designing and executing CTW's formative research, and for working with ETS, which handled the Workshop's summative research. Palmer's work was so crucial to Sesame Street that author Malcolm Gladwell asserted, "Without Ed Palmer, the show would have never lasted through the first season." (Note: Cooney called Palmer, along with Lesser, "two of the original architects of CTW research".)

CTW's researchers were strongly influenced by behaviorism, a popular movement in psychology during the late 1960s; therefore, many methods and tools used were primarily behavioral. Palmer developed "the distractor", which he used to test if the material shown on Sesame Street captured young viewers' attention. Two children at a time were brought into the laboratory and shown an episode on a television monitor and a slide show next to it. The slides would change every seven seconds; researchers recorded when the children's attention was diverted from the episode. They were able to assess almost every second of Sesame Street this way; if an episode captured children's interest 80–90 percent of the time, producers would air it. However, if it only worked 50 percent of the time they would change (or remove) content. (Note: For example, in 1992, the producers decided to address divorce, but when research found that the episodes produced "unintended negative effects" on the children who watched them, such as confusion, they chose to never air the episode, entitled "Snuffy's Parents Get a Divorce", in spite of the expense.) In research conducted during later seasons of Sesame Street, verbal measurements, in the form of letter-recognition tests, were introduced. These reinforced earlier results, providing more insight into children's knowledge, reactions, and responses than behavioral measures alone. The distractor method was modified by Workshop researchers Lewis Bernstein and Valeria Lovelace into an "eyes-on-screen" method, which collected simultaneous data from larger groups of children. Their method also tested for more "natural" distractions, such as those provided by other children in group-viewing situations; up to 15 children were tested at a time. Lovelace developed additional testing methods, described by Fisch as "state-of-the-art research design". One innovation included the "engagement measure", which recorded children's active responses to an episode, such as laughing or dancing to music.

=== Results ===
Palmer reported that by the fourth season of the show, the episodes rarely tested below 85 percent. At least one segment, "The Man from Alphabet", despite its expense, was eliminated because it tested poorly with children. The distractor provided new insight into the way children watch television, and was part of CTW's research on its programs' effectiveness for decades. It created a body of objective data for the scientific study of children's television viewing.

CTW's early studies with the distractor found that children learned more when they watched the program carefully, or when they participated by singing or talking along. In re-tests four weeks later, it found that children retained most of what they learned. After the first three weeks, or 15 episodes, viewers and non-viewers were compared; few differences in learning were found. When both groups were tested after six weeks more differences began to appear, with viewers scoring higher than non-viewers. A two-season CTW study published in 1995 found a "significant increase" in difficulty in remembering the letter and number of the day. Based on the multiple-intelligence theory, producers began to cluster Sesame Street's short films, animations, and inserts around a single topic rather than sprinkling several topics throughout a single episode.

== Summative research ==
=== ETS studies ===
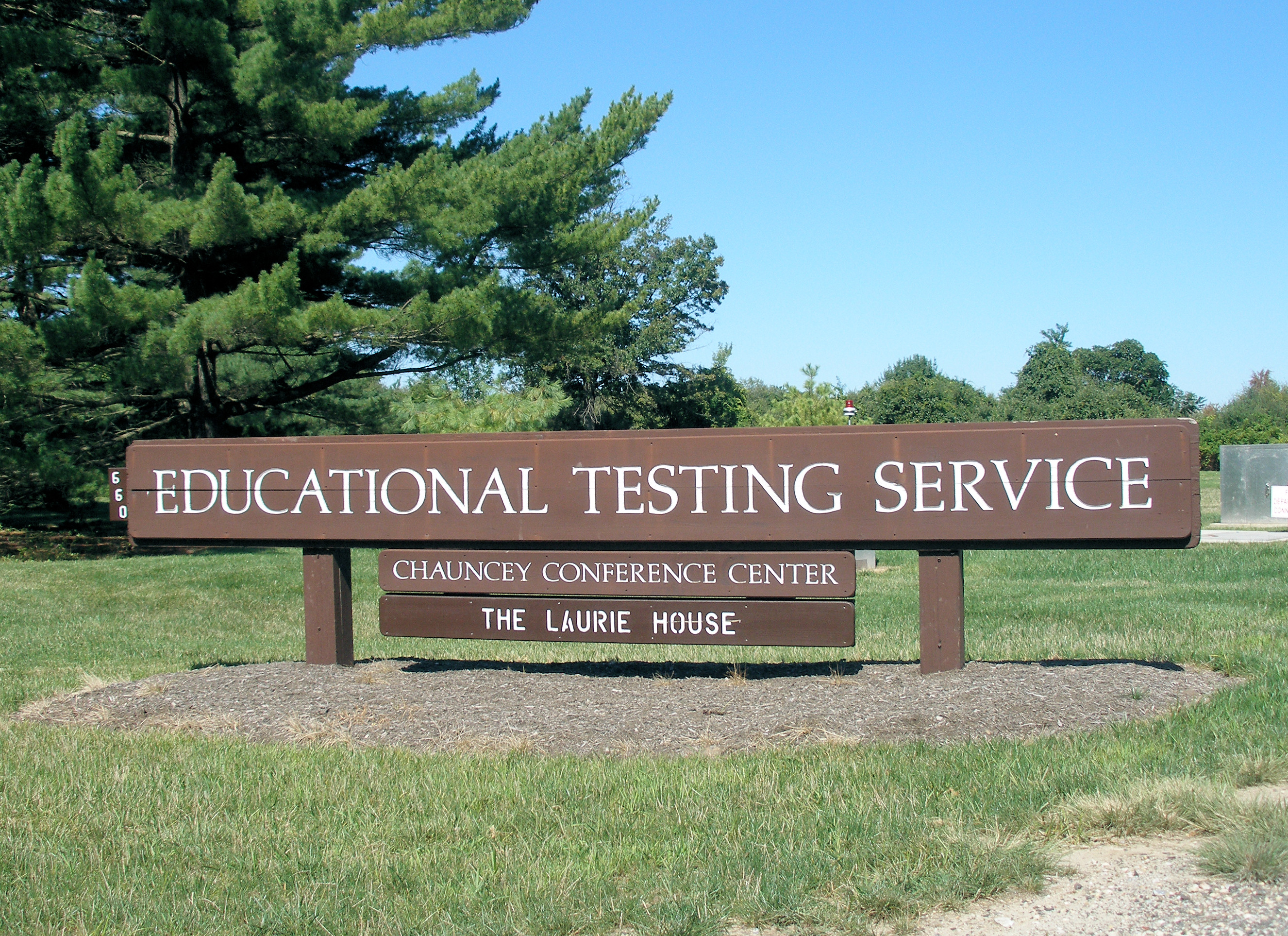
Sign at entrance to ETS headquarters; ETS conducted early summative studies on Sesame Street.

CTW solicited the Educational Testing Service (ETS) to conduct its summative research; (Note: Sam Ball was ETS' principal investigator.) CTW and ETS hired and trained coordinators, testers, and observers from local communities to conduct these studies. The most relevant tests of the show's effectiveness were comparisons between children who watched it regularly and those who did not. After the first season, however, Sesame Street was so widely watched that it was difficult to make this distinction; ETS began to have problems finding subjects for their non-viewing groups, which weakened the experimental design. It solved this problem by selecting control-group households from areas that did not broadcast the show. Instead of using groups of viewers and non-viewers, later large-scale studies used statistical designs and methods for estimating cause-effect relationships.

ETS, whose prestige enhanced the credibility of its findings, conducted two landmark summative evaluations in 1970 and 1971, demonstrating that Sesame Street had a significant educational impact on its viewers. These studies illustrated the early educational effects of Sesame Street, and have been cited in other studies of the effects of television on young children. (Note: According to Palmer and his colleague Shalom M. Fisch, these studies were responsible for securing funding for the show over the next several years.) ETS reported that the children who watched the show most learned the most, and achieved better results in letter-recognition skills. Three-year-olds who watched regularly scored higher than five-year-olds who did not; children from low-income households who were regular viewers scored higher than children from higher-income households who watched the show less frequently. Similar results occurred in children from non-English-speaking homes. Although adult supervision was not required for children to learn using the material presented, children who watched and discussed the program with their parents gained more skills than those who did not. Children viewing the show in an informal home setting learned as much as children who watched it at school under a teacher's supervision. Regular viewers adjusted better to the school environment than non-viewers. They also had a more positive attitude toward school and better peer relations than non-viewers.

Despite CTW's concern that the show would widen the gap between well-to-do children and their less wealthy peers, there was no evidence that this occurred; gains made by disadvantaged children were as great as those by advantaged children. The show's positive general effects, as cited by ETS, occurred across all childhood demographics (gender, age, geographic location and socioeconomic status). Studies conducted by ETS seemed to suggest that the program had "a significant impact on children's social behavior", although the evidence was not as strong as it was for cognitive effects; fewer studies exist of social behavior.

=== Later studies ===
==== Before 2000 ====
CTW enlisted Palmer, in conjunction with Harvard University, in 1979 to conduct a study in Jamaica regarding the effects of Sesame Street on children with no exposure to other children's television programs, in order to correct for the effects of multimedia exposure on children in the U.S. Palmer discovered that Jamaican children's interest dropped during segments with the Muppets, possibly due to language and cultural differences; musical segments were the most effective. The children's learning increased after exposure to the show, especially letter and number recognition.

In 1995, a longitudinal study was conducted at the University of Kansas, the first large-scale evaluation of Sesame Street's cognitive effects in over twenty years. Its findings supported those of previous studies: early viewing of educational children's television appeared to contribute to children's school readiness. Children from disadvantaged backgrounds learned as much as advantaged children per hour of viewing, but they did not watch enough to gain the program's maximum benefit. When the effects of watching Sesame Street were compared with the effects of watching other programs, commercial entertainment and cartoons had a negative effect; watching Sesame Street daily did not increase children's viewing of other categories of television, nor make them less likely to participate in other educational activities.

Other studies have been conducted about the cognitive effects of Sesame Street. In 1990, a two-year longitudinal study found that viewing the show was a "significant predictor" of improved vocabulary regardless of family size, parent education, child gender or parental attitudes towards television. Another study conducted in 1990 looked at the effect of Sesame Street home videos and discovered gains in vocabulary, letter, and printed- and spoken-word identification. The videos encouraged discussion with adults, which may have helped reinforce educational messages and content.

In 1994, research was conducted for "The Recontact Study", funded by the Markle Foundation, which examined the effects of Sesame Street on adolescents who had watched the show as young children. The subjects had participated in previous studies as preschoolers. When the study's research subjects were statistically equated for parents' level of education, birth order, residence and gender, it found that adolescents who had watched Sesame Street as preschoolers were positively influenced by it. Compared with children who had not watched it regularly, they had higher grades in English, math, and science; read for pleasure more often; perceived themselves as more competent, and expressed lower levels of aggression. The effects were stronger in adolescent boys than in adolescent girls.

==== 2000–2010 ====
In early 2001, the Workshop conducted a summative study about the effects of war, natural disasters, and other events on young children. It demonstrated that little was being done to address the fears and concerns of victims of traumatic events. As a result, the Workshop developed a series of materials it believed would help children (and their families) cope with events such as the September 11 terrorist attacks and Hurricane Katrina.

Sesame Street has been used to test the attention span of infants and toddlers. In 2004, children from three months to two years were shown Sesame Street clips and a group of computer-generated black and white patterns. Their attention spans, as determined by the duration of time they looked at the stimuli, significantly increased at six to twenty-four months, but only for the Sesame Street material. A study conducted in 2006 found that infants' attention span increased more when they were presented with video clips than with still images of the same stimuli, supporting the idea that movement helps young infants gain more information from the world around them. The evidence showed that attention span depended both on age and on the type of stimuli children viewed. The time they looked at stimuli decreased for all types of stimuli from fourteen to twenty-six weeks, but the time they looked at it increased depending on the stimuli. When older infants (age fourteen weeks to twelve months) looked at Sesame Street materials and human faces, their attention increased compared to other types of stimuli.

In 2010, researchers at the University of Michigan studied the effect of combining video clips of Sesame Street and related print materials, online activities, and teacher training and mentoring on learning. They demonstrated that all the subjects they tested at Head Start programs in Detroit scored the same as a middle-class control group in tests later given to both groups. (Note: This study was part of a series of studies commissioned by the U.S. Department of Education between 2005–2010 as part of its Ready to Learn initiatives supporting public television. These studies emphasized newer PBS educational shows such as Between the Lions, Super Why!, Martha Speaks, and the updated version of The Electric Company, and found similar results.)

==== Post 2010 ====
Researchers James A. Bonus and Marie-Louise Mares from the University of Wisconsin–Madison studied in 2015 if preschoolers, due to their developing understanding of video and the distinctions between fantasy and reality, use information appropriately, and if children's explicit reality judgments of educational and fantasy TV content influence their willingness to transfer the content to real life. Earlier studies showed that viewers of educational programs like Sesame Street often understand, remember, and use less information that producers intend, so the researchers of this study wanted to examine if children's reality judgments play an important role in their responses. They also wanted to find if children were able to distinguish educational material from entertainment and remember and transfer content to real-life situations, especially since many programs embed educational lessons in fantasy elements. The researchers showed 70 three- to five-year old children a nine-minute clip from a Sesame Street episode about aspects of Hispanic culture, introducing it to them as either "fun" or "for learning". The children then answered comprehension questions and rated the reality of the fantasy and educational content in the clip and were interviewed about the content about a week later, when their memory and reality judgments were reassessed. The children in the study retained most of what they had learned, but all ages became more skeptical about the reality of both the fantasy and educational content. Children in the five-year old group remembered the information they learned from the clip better than three- and four-year old children, but for all groups, the more likely they judged what they viewed was real, the more likely they were to use the information in other settings. Only the group of five-year old children transferred educational content from the TV show to new situations, but three-year olds were less able to do so. Bonus and Mares were able to demonstrate that reality judgments play an important role in children's ability to transfer information and that "children remembered what they learned to a remarkable degree", even a week or more later. Children in the five-year old group scored higher in learning the material they viewed and what it was meant to reflect real-world conditions so they could remember it in order to transfer it to real-world conditions, most likely due to the combination of older children's better memory skills and a greater understanding of the educational content as it related to the real world. Children's reality ratings of fantasy content were less than those for educational content, despite exposure and age differences.

Even when controlling for age, greater memory of the fantasy content was associated with less transfer of the content, which indicated, for Bonus and Mares, that children knew that the fantasy elements did not apply to real life; according to Bonus and Mares, "The primary problem was their failure to transfer educational content when it was appropriate." Unlike previous studies, this study found that neither fantasy-reality or educational judgments predicted the children's learning of the educational content. The reason for the difference in findings was unclear, but Bonus and Mares conjectured that it was to differences between the programs used in other studies, which used animated programs, and Sesame Street, which includes live action content. It could have also been due to differences in interview questions, this study's small sample size, or random chance; Bonus and Mares recognized that more experiments needed to be conducted. This study also did not replicate previous studies that found that verbal instructions help children judge the reality of media content more accurately, perhaps because their instructions were too brief or vague. There were other limitations with this study, including not pursuing if children's skepticism could be reduced by eliminating fantasy cues.

Pollster Frank Luntz found in 2018 that almost two-thirds of those he surveyed believed Sesame Street "represents 'the best of America' and that it stands for 'timeless values'". Luntz also conducted focus groups in North Carolina and New York, and found that both groups had "a shared affection" for the show.

Melissa S. Kearney and Phillip B. Levine of the University of Maryland, in response to the lack of studies on Sesame Street's effects on improving longer-term outcomes for disadvantaged children, conducted "a large-scale examination of the impact of the introduction of Sesame Street on elementary school performance" in 2019 and its effect on longer-term educational and labor market outcomes. They also conducted the study to encourage discussions about policy regarding early childhood education, especially for disadvantaged youth. Recognizing that the show's popularity hampered the experimental design of testing the show's educational impact, Kearney and Levine conducted their study by exploiting the limitations in television technology at the time of its premiere, which restricted access to Sesame Street to about two-thirds of the population in the U.S. They investigated if the educational outcomes among children who were under six years of age in 1969 and who lived in locations where they had access to the show compared to those who did not. They found evidence, through studying surveys of children's educational outcomes in 1980, that exposure to the show during its early years "generated a positive impact on educational outcomes through the early school years". They also found that children who were able to watch the show were fourteen percent more likely to attend the grade that was appropriate for their age during their middle and high school years. They found positive effects for both boys and girls, with larger effects for boys, and demonstrated positive effects for blacks, Hispanics, and white non-Hispanics, with larger effects for blacks and Hispanics. Adults who were exposed to the show as young children also were more likely to be employed and earned higher wages.

Kearney and Levine studied the effects of exposure to Sesame Street programming content on indictors of early school performance, ultimate educational attainment, and labor market outcomes. Studies conducted at the time of the show's premiere demonstrated that watching the show resulted in an immediate and sizable increase in test scores. Kearney and Levine built upon the existing body of early, targeted evidence and found positive impacts on the educational performance of preschool-aged children who were able to watch the show because they resided in areas with wider broadcast coverage. These children achieved relative increases in grade-for-age status and represents improvements in academic progress during elementary school, when students are more likely to fall behind their appropriate grade level. They saw the same kind of improvements in the long run, also consistent with the grade-for-age results. The positive effect of the show seemed to be "particularly pronounced" for boys and black, non-Hispanic children, along with children who grew up in areas characterized by greater economic disadvantages. Consequently, Kearney and Levine, who called Sesame Street "perhaps the biggest, yet least costly, early childhood intervention", found that the show satisfied its goal of preparing children for school, especially for black and disadvantaged children, at a cost of, at the time the study was conducted, approximately five dollars per child per year.

In 2020, Gemma Yoo from Yale University published an article, entitled "An Upstander Is a Person in Your Neighborhood: Children, Sesame Street, and Race in 2020", about how Sesame Street has attempted to confront racism throughout its history, "through its diverse cast and, in the summer of 2020, by directly addressing the topic with children and families". Yoo, who called children's media, including Sesame Street, "the most accessible format for teaching young children about race and racism in the United States", looked at the show through the lens of Critical Race Theory (CRT), analyzed how the show has both successfully and unsuccessfully addressed race and racism in the U.S. and made suggestions for how it could use CRT to both evaluate how young children are taught about race and to help mitigate the negative effects of racism.

In 2021, a group of researchers published a study that examined whether viewing educational materials about autism would change attitudes and implicit biases toward children with autism. They studied two groups, parents of children with autism and parents of children without autism, giving both groups tests about their attitudes and biases before and after viewing a website developed by Sesame Workshop containing information about autism and resources for families. They found that parents of children with autism had less implicit bias than parents of children without autism before they viewed the materials on the website, but both groups' attitudes and biases did not differ after they viewed the website. They also found that parents of children without autism and those who had more negative implicit attitudes before viewing the website demonstrated a greater reduction in implicit bias after viewing it, and parents of children with autism demonstrated more positive changes in their explicit attitudes and increased knowledge about autism after viewing the website. The study's findings suggested that online educational resources about autism "can reduce implicit bias against children with autism and help mitigate some of the psychological issues associated with parenting children with autism".

== Works cited ==
- Bonus, James A. and Marie-Louise Mares (14 October 2015). "Learned and Remembered But Rejected: Preschoolers’ Reality Judgments and Transfer from Sesame Street". Communication Research, vol. 46, no. 3, pp. 375–400. doi:10.1177/0093650215609980.
- Borgenicht, David (1998). Sesame Street Unpaved. New York: Hyperion ISBN 978-0-7868-6460-7.
- Courage, Mary L.; Greg D. Reynolds; John E. Richards (May–June 2006). "Infants' Attention to Patterned Stimuli: Developmental Change from 3 to 12 Months of Age". Child Development, vol. 77, no. 3, pp. 680–695. doi:10.1111/j.1467-8624.2006.00897.x. pmid:16686795.
- Davis, Michael (2008). Street Gang: The Complete History of Sesame Street. New York: Viking Press. ISBN 978-0-670-01996-0.
- Fisch, Shalom M.; Rosemarie T., eds (2001). "G" is for Growing: Thirty Years of Research on Children and Sesame Street. Mahweh, New Jersey: Lawrence Erlbaum Publishers. ISBN 978-0-8058-3395-9.
  - Cooney, Joan Ganz, "Foreword", pp. xi–xiv.
  - Truglio, Rosemarie T. and Shalom M. Fisch, "Introduction", pp. xv–xxi.
  - Palmer, Edward and Shalom M. Fisch, "The Beginnings of Sesame Street Research", pp. 3–24.
  - Lesser, Gerald S. and Joel Schneider, "Creation and Evolution of the Sesame Street Curriculum", pp. 25–38.
  - Fisch, Shalom M. and Lewis Bernstein, "Formative Research Revealed: Methodological and Process Issues in Formative Research", pp. 39–60.
  - Truglio, Rosemarie T. et al., "The Varied Role of Formative Research: Case Studies from 30 Years", pp. 61–82.
  - Mielke, Keith W., "A Review of Research on the Educational and Social Impact of Sesame Street", pp. 83–97.
  - Wright, John C. et al., "The Early Window Project: Sesame Street Prepares Children for School", pp. 97–114.
  - Huston, Aletha C. et al., "Sesame Street Viewers as Adolescents: The Recontact Study", pp. 131–146.
- Gikow, Louise A. (2009). Sesame Street: A Celebration – Forty Years of Life on the Street. New York: Black Dog & Leventhal. ISBN 978-1-57912-638-4.
- Gladwell, Malcolm (2000). The Tipping Point: How Little Things Can Make a Big Difference. New York: Little, Brown & Co. ISBN 978-0-316-31696-5.
- Kearney, Melissa S. and Phillip B. Levine (January 2019). "Early Childhood Education by Television: Lessons from Sesame Street". American Economic Journal: Applied Economics, vol. 11, no. 1, pp. 318–350. doi:10.1257/app.20170300.
- Lesser, Gerald S. (1975). Children and Television: Lessons From Sesame Street. New York: Vintage Books. ISBN 978-0-394-71448-6.
- Linebarger, Deborah L. (November 2011). "Teaching with Television: New Evidence Supports an Old Medium". The Phi Delta Kappan, vol. 93, no. 3, pp. 62–65. doi:10.1177/003172171109300315.
- Morrow, Robert W. (2006). Sesame Street and the Reform of Children's Television. Baltimore: Johns Hopkins University Press. ISBN 978-0-8018-8230-2.
