= History of Sesame Street =

The preschool educational television program Sesame Street was first aired on public television stations on November 10, 1969, and is currently on its 56th season as of 2026. The history of Sesame Street has reflected changing attitudes to developmental psychology, early childhood education, and cultural diversity. Featuring Jim Henson's Muppets, animation, live shorts, humor and celebrity appearances, it was the first television program of its kind to base its content and production values on laboratory and formative research, and the first to include a curriculum "detailed or stated in terms of measurable outcomes". Initial responses to the show included adulatory reviews, some controversy and high ratings. By its 40th anniversary in 2009, Sesame Street was broadcast in over 120 countries, and 20 independent international versions had been produced. It has won eleven Grammys and over 150 Emmys in its history—more than any other children's show.

The show was conceived in 1966 during discussions between television producer Joan Ganz Cooney and Carnegie Corporation vice president Lloyd Morrisett. Their goal was to create a children's television show that would "master the addictive qualities of television and do something good with them", such as helping young children prepare for school. After two years of research, the newly formed Children's Television Workshop (CTW) received a combined grant of $8 million from the Carnegie Corporation, the Ford Foundation and the U.S. federal government to create and produce a new children's television show.

By the show's tenth anniversary in 1979, nine million American children under the age of six were watching Sesame Street daily, and several studies showed it was having a positive educational impact. The cast and crew expanded during this time, including the hiring of women in the crew and additional minorities in the cast. In 1981, the federal government withdrew its funding, so the CTW turned to other sources, such as its magazine division, book royalties, product licensing and foreign income. During the 1980s, Sesame Street's curriculum expanded to include topics such as relationships, ethics and emotions. Many of the show's storylines were taken from the experiences of its writing staff, cast and crew, most notably the death of Will Lee—who played Mr. Hooper—and the marriage of Luis and Maria.

In recent decades, Sesame Street has faced societal and economic challenges, including changes in the viewing habits of young children, more competition from other shows, the development of cable television and a drop in ratings. After the turn of the 21st century, the show made major structural adaptations, including changing its traditional magazine format to a narrative format. Because of the popularity of the Muppet Elmo, the show incorporated a popular segment known as "Elmo's World". In late 2015, in response to "sweeping changes in the media business", HBO began airing first-run episodes of Sesame Street. Episodes became available on PBS stations and websites nine months after they aired on HBO. As of its 50th anniversary in 2019, Sesame Street has produced over 4,500 episodes, 35 TV specials, 200 home videos, and 180 albums. Its YouTube channel had almost 5 million subscribers, and the show had 24 million followers on social media.

== Background ==
In the late 1960s, 97% of all American households owned a television set, and preschool children watched an average of 27 hours of television per week; programs created for them were widely criticized for being too violent and for reflecting commercial values. Producer Joan Ganz Cooney called children's programming a "wasteland", and she was not alone in her criticism. (Note: Federal Communications Commission (FCC) chairman Newton Minow had famously called American television a "vast wasteland" in 1961.) Many children's television programs were produced by local stations, with little regard for educational goals, or cultural diversity. (Note: See Davis, pp. 30–41, and Palmer & Fisch in Fisch & Truglio, pp. 6–7, for a discussion about the state of children's television programming.) As writer David Borgenicht stated, the use of children's programming as an educational tool was "unproven" and "a revolutionary concept".

According to children's media experts Edward Palmer and Shalom M. Fisch, children's television programs of the 1950s and 1960s duplicated "prior media forms". For example, they tended to show simple shots of a camera's-eye view of a location filled with children, or they recreated storybooks with shots of book covers and motionless illustrated pages. (Note: Reading a book on television is ineffective because of its "static visual quality and its total reliance on still pictures and spoken words".) The hosts of these programs were "insufferably condescending", though one exception was Captain Kangaroo, created and hosted by Bob Keeshan, which author Michael Davis described as having a "slower pace and idealism" that most other children's shows lacked. (Note: Many of Keeshan's staff, including Jon Stone, Tom Whedon, Norton Wright, David Connell, Sam Gibbon, and Kevin Clash would later work on Sesame Street. According to historian Robert Morrow, many in the press saw Sesame Street as not only a model for educational television, but for the improvement and reform of television as a whole.)

Early childhood educational research had shown that when children were prepared to succeed in school, they earned higher grades and learned more effectively. Children from low-income families had fewer resources than children from higher-income families to prepare them for school. Research had shown that children from low-income, minority backgrounds tested "substantially lower" than middle-class children in school-related skills, and that they continued to have educational deficits throughout school. The field of developmental psychology had grown during this period, and scientists were beginning to understand that changes in early childhood education could increase children's cognitive growth. Because of these trends in education, along with the great societal changes occurring in the United States during this era, the time was ripe for the creation of a show like Sesame Street.

== Pre-production (1966–1969) ==
=== Beginnings ===
"What if? became their operative phrase. What if you could create content that was both entertaining and instructive? What if it went down more like ice cream than spinach?"

— Michael Davis, speaking about the development of Sesame Street

Since 1962, Cooney had been producing talk shows and documentaries at educational television station WNDT, and in 1966 had won an Emmy for a documentary about poverty in America. In early 1966, Cooney and her husband Tim hosted a dinner party at their apartment in New York; experimental psychologist Lloyd Morrisett, who has been called Sesame Street's "financial godfather", and his wife Mary were among the guests. Cooney's boss, Lewis Freedman, whom Cooney called "the grandfather of Sesame Street", also attended the party, as did their colleague Anne Bower. As a vice-president at the Carnegie Corporation, Morrisett had awarded several million dollars in grants to organizations that educated poor and minority preschool children. Morrisett and the other guests felt that even with limited resources, television could be an effective way to reach millions of children.

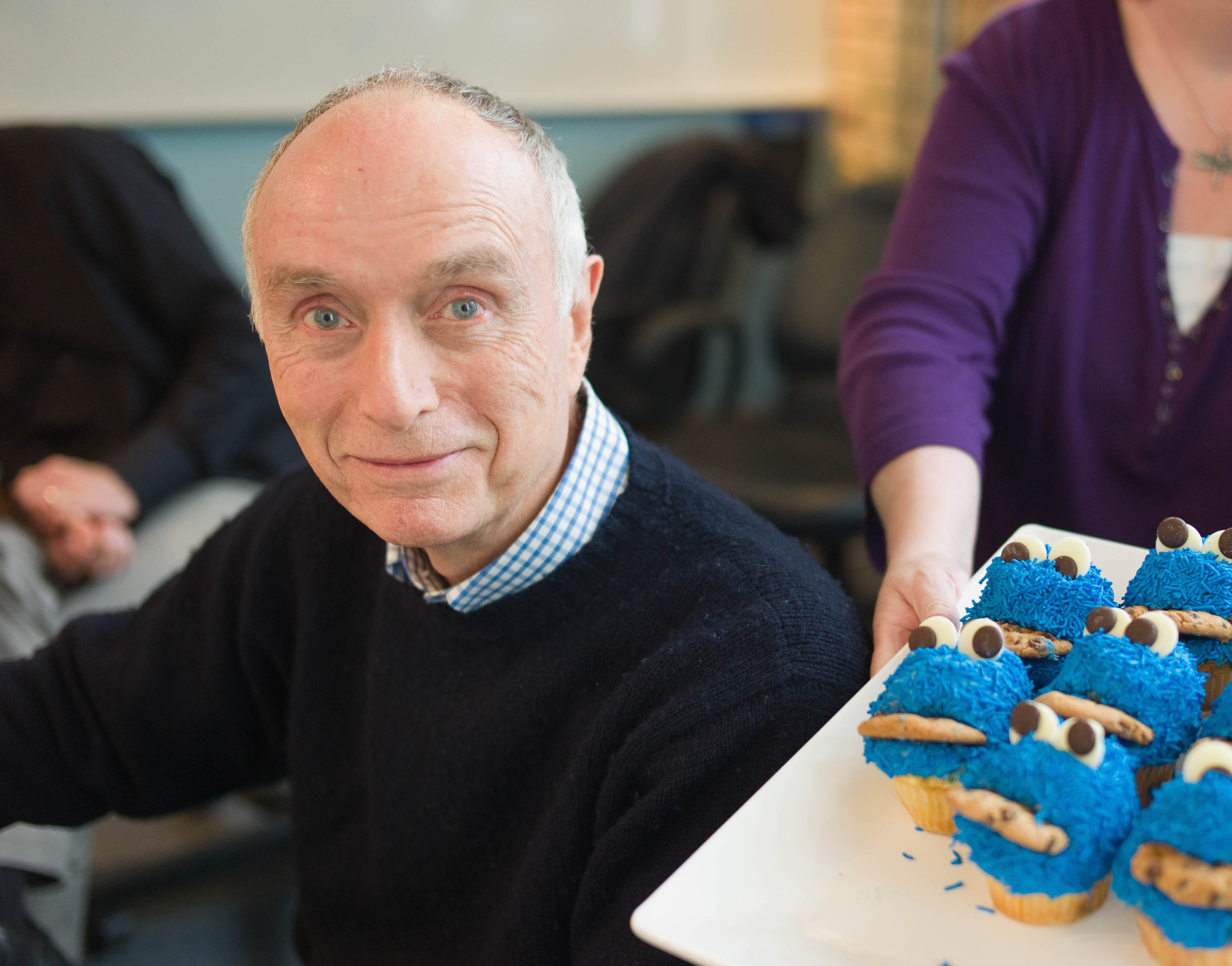
Lloyd Morrisett, co-creator of Sesame Street and co-founder of Sesame Workshop, shown here in 2010.

A few days after the dinner party, Cooney, Freedman, and Morrisett met at the Carnegie Corporation's offices to make plans; they wanted to harness the addictive power of television for their own purposes, but did not yet know how. The following summer, Morrisett hired her to conduct research on childhood development, education and media, and she visited experts in these fields across the United States and Canada. She researched their ideas about the viewing habits of young children and wrote a report on her findings.

Cooney's study, titled "The Potential Uses of Television for Preschool Education", spelled out how television could be used to help young children, especially from low-income families, prepare for school. The focus on the new show was on children from disadvantaged backgrounds, but Cooney and the show's creators recognized that in order to achieve the kind of success they wanted, it had to be equally accessible to children of all socio-economic and ethnic backgrounds. At the same time, they wanted to make the show so appealing to inner-city children that it would help them learn as much as children with more educational opportunities.

Cooney proposed that public television, even though it had a poor track record in attracting inner-city audiences, could be used to improve the quality of children's programming. She suggested using the television medium's "most engaging traits", including high production values, sophisticated writing, and quality film and animation, to reach the largest audience possible. In the words of critic Peter Hellman, "If [children] could recite Budweiser jingles from TV, why not give them a program that would teach the ABCs and simple number concepts?" Cooney wanted to create a program that would spread values favoring education to nonviewers—including their parents and older siblings, who tended to control the television set. To this end, she suggested that humor directed toward adults be included, which, as Lesser reported, "may turn out to be a pretty good system in forcing the young child to stretch to understand programs designed for older audiences". By 2019, 80% of parents watched Sesame Street with their children.

=== Development ===
As a result of Cooney's proposal, the Carnegie Corporation awarded her a $1 million grant in 1968 to establish the Children's Television Workshop (CTW) to provide support to the creative staff of the new show. Morrisett, who was responsible for fundraising, procured additional grants from the United States federal government, the Corporation for Public Broadcasting, and the Ford Foundation for the CTW's initial budget, which totaled $8 million; obtaining funding from this combination of government agencies and private foundations protected the CTW from economic pressures experienced by commercial networks. Sesame Street was an expensive program to produce because the creators decided they needed to compete with other programs that invested in professional, high quality production.

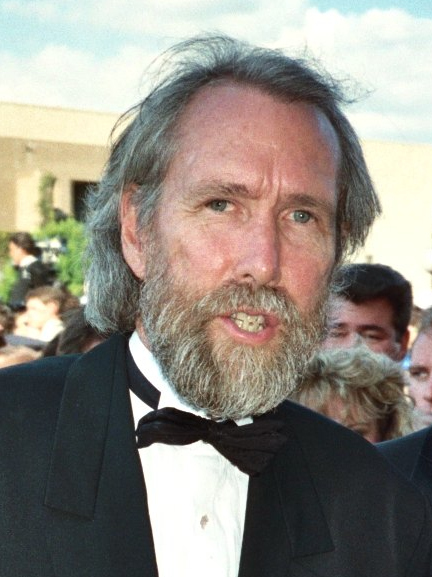
Jim Henson, (1989), creator of the Muppets. Henson was initially reluctant to become involved with a children's show, but agreed to do so.

The producers spent eighteen months preparing the new show, something unprecedented in children's television. The show had a budget of $28,000 per episode. After being named executive director of the CTW, (Note: Cooney was one of the first female executives in American television; her appointment was called "one of the most important television developments of the decade".) Cooney began to assemble a team of producers: Jon Stone was responsible for writing, casting, and format; David Connell took over animation and volume; and Samuel Gibbon served as the show's chief liaison between the production staff and the research team. Stone, Connell, and Gibbon had worked on Captain Kangaroo together, but were not involved in children's television when Cooney recruited them. (Note: Cooney later said about Sesame Street's original team of producers, "collectively, we were a genius".) At first, Cooney planned to divide the show's production of five episodes a week among several teams, but she was advised by CBS vice-president of programming Michael Dann to use only one. This production team was led by Connell, who had gained experience producing many episodes in a short period of time, a process called "volume production", during his eleven years working on Captain Kangaroo.

The CTW hired Harvard University professor Gerald S. Lesser to design the show's educational objectives and establish and lead a National Board of Advisers. Instead of providing what Lesser called "window dressing", the Board actively participated in the construction of educational goals and creative methods. At the Board's direction, Lesser conducted five three-day curriculum planning seminars in Boston and New York City in summer 1968. (Note: See Lesser, pp. 42–59, for Lesser's lengthy description of the seminars.) The purpose of the seminars was to ascertain which school-preparation skills to emphasize in the new show. The producers gathered professionals with diverse backgrounds to obtain ideas for educational content. They reported that the seminars were "widely successful", and resulted in long and detailed lists of possible topics for inclusion in the Sesame Street curriculum; in fact, the seminars produced more suggested educational objectives than could ever be addressed by one television series.

Instead of focusing on the social and emotional aspects of development, the producers decided to follow the suggestions of the seminar participants and emphasize cognitive skills, a decision they felt was warranted by the demands of school and the wishes of parents. The objectives developed during the seminars were condensed into key categories: symbolic representation, cognitive processes, and the physical and social environment. (Note: See Lesser, pp. 62–74 for a detailed list of the CTW's learning objectives.) The seminars set forth the new show's policy about race and social issues and provided the show's production and creative team with "a crash course" in psychology, child development, and early childhood education. They also marked the beginning of Jim Henson's involvement in Sesame Street. Cooney met Henson at one of the seminars; Stone, who was familiar with Henson's work, felt that if they could not bring him on board, they should "make do without puppets". (Note: Initially, Henson was reluctant to join the show, but agreed for humanitarian reasons. He also agreed to waive his performance rights for full ownership of the Sesame Street Muppets and to split the revenue they generated with the CTW. By 2008, this revenue accounted for $15 million—17 million in licensing and merchandising fees.)

The producers and writers decided to build the new show around a brownstone or an inner-city street, a choice Davis called "unprecedented". Stone was convinced that in order for inner-city children to relate to Sesame Street, it needed to be set in a familiar place. Despite its urban setting, the producers decided to avoid depicting more negativity than what was already present in the child's environment. Lesser commented, "[despite] all its raucousness and slapstick humor, Sesame Street became a sweet show, and its staff maintains that there is nothing wrong in that".

The new show was called the "Preschool Educational Television Show" in promotional materials; the producers were unable to agree on a name they liked and waited until the last minute to make a decision. In a short, irreverent promotional film shown to public television executives, the producers parodied their "naming dilemma". The producers were reportedly "frantic for a title"; they finally settled on the name that they least disliked: Sesame Street, inspired by Ali Baba's magical phrase, although there were concerns that it would be too difficult for young children to pronounce. Stone was one of the producers who disliked the name, but, he said, "I was outvoted, for which I'm deeply grateful". (Note: Several names were suggested, including Stone's favorite, 123 Avenue B; it was rejected because it sounded too much like a New York City address.)

The responsibility of casting for Sesame Street fell to Jon Stone, who set out to form a cast where white actors were in the minority. He did not begin auditions until spring 1969, several weeks before five test shows were due to be produced. He filmed the auditions, and Palmer took them into the field to test children's reactions. The actors who received the "most enthusiastic thumbs up" were cast. For example, Loretta Long was chosen to play Susan when the children who saw her audition stood up and sang along with her rendition of "I'm a Little Teapot". Stone reported that casting was the only aspect that was "just completely haphazard". Most of the cast and crew found jobs on Sesame Street through personal relationships with Stone and the other producers. Stone hired Bob McGrath (an actor and singer best known at the time for his appearances on Mitch Miller's sing-along show on NBC) to play Bob, Will Lee to play Mr. Hooper, and Garrett Saunders to play Gordon. (Note: For a detailed discussion about Sesame Street's first cast, see Davis, pp. 172–182)

=== Use of research in production ===
Sesame Street was the first children's television program that used a curriculum with clear and measurable outcomes, and was the first to use research in the creation of the show's design and content. Research in Sesame Street had three functions: to test if the show was appealing to children, to discover what could be done to make the show more appealing, and to report to the public and the investors what impact the show had on its young viewers. Ten to fifteen percent of the show's initial budget of $8 million was devoted to research, and researchers were always present in the studio during the show's filming. A "Writer's Notebook" was developed to assist writers and producers in translating the research and production goals into televised material; this connected the show's curriculum goals and its script development. The Muppet characters were created to fill specific curriculum needs: Oscar the Grouch, for example, was designed to teach children about their positive and negative emotions. Lesser called the collaboration between researchers and producers, as well as the idea of using television as an educational tool, the "CTW model". Cooney agreed, commenting, "From the beginning, we—the planners of the project—designed the show as an experimental research project with educational advisers, researchers, and television producers collaborating as equal partners".

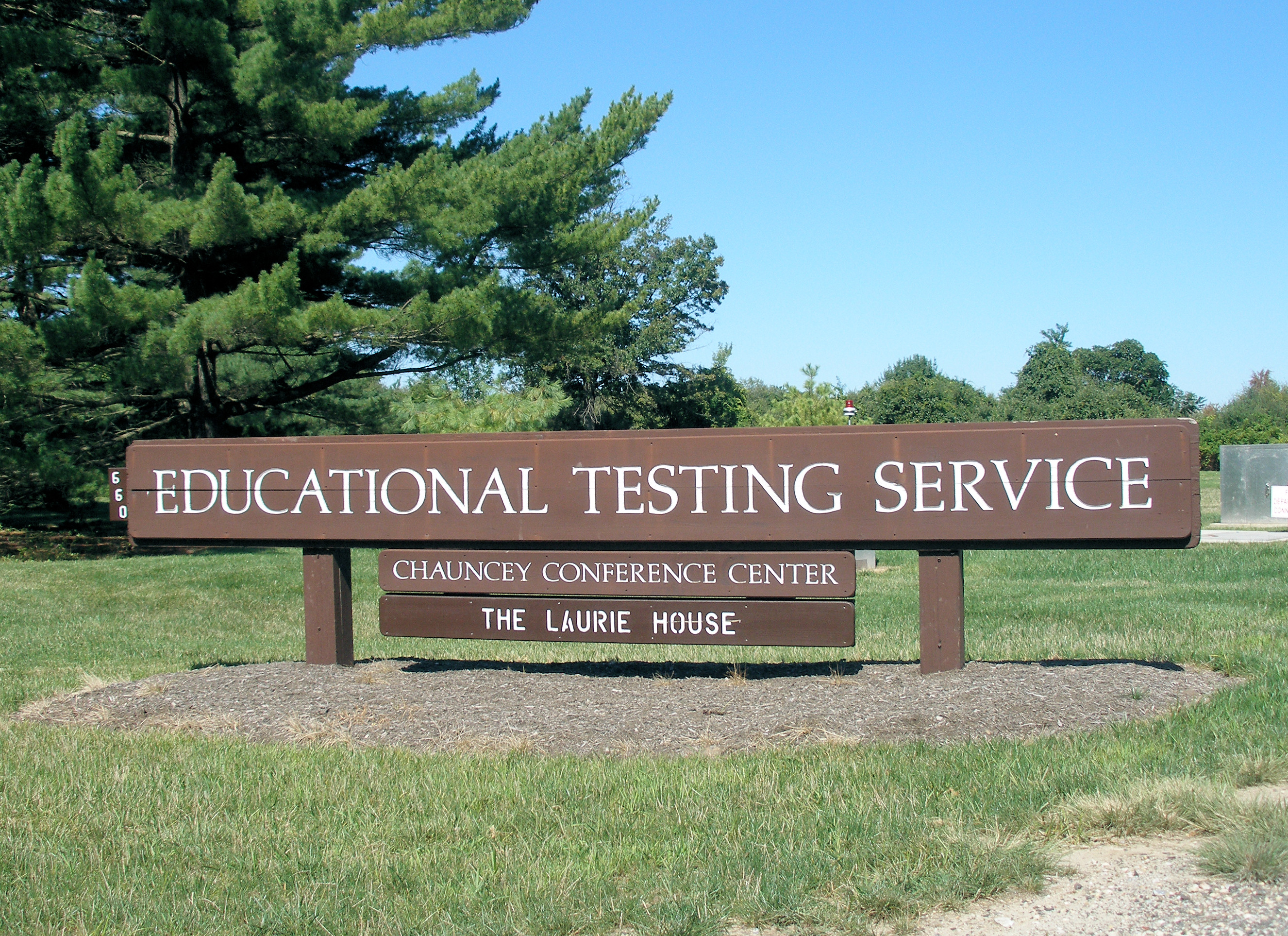
Welcome sign at entrance to ETS headquarters. The ETS conducted the early summative studies about Sesame Street.

The producers of Sesame Street believed education through television was possible if they captured and sustained children's attention; this meant the show needed a strong appeal. Edward Palmer, the CTW's first Director of Research and the man Cooney credited with building the CTW's foundation of research, was one of the few academics in the late 1960s researching children's television. He was recruited by the CTW to test if the curricula developed in the Boston seminars were reaching their audience effectively. Palmer was also tasked with designing and executing the CTW's in-house research and with working with the Educational Testing Service (ETS). His research was so crucial to Sesame Street that Gladwell asserted, "... without Ed Palmer, the show would have never lasted through the first season". (Note: Cooney called Palmer and Lesser "two of the original architects of CTW research".)

Palmer and his team's approach to researching the show's effectiveness was innovative; it was the first time formative research was conducted in this way. For example, Palmer developed "the distractor", which he used to test if the material shown on Sesame Street captured young viewers' attention. Two children at a time were brought into the laboratory; they were shown an episode on a television monitor and a slide show next to it. The slides would change every seven seconds, and researchers recorded when the children's attention was diverted away from the episode. They were able to record almost every second of Sesame Street this way; if the episode captured the children's interest 80–90% of the time, the producers would air it, but if it only tested 50%, they would reshoot. By the fourth season of the show, the episodes rarely tested below 85%.

=== July 1969 test episodes ===
During the production of Sesame Street's first season, producers created five one-hour episodes to test the show's appeal to children and examine their comprehension of the material. Not intended for broadcast, they were presented to preschoolers in 60 homes throughout Philadelphia and in day care centers in New York City in July 1969. The results were "generally very positive"; children learned from the shows, their appeal was high, and their attention was sustained over the full hour. However, the researchers found that although children's attention was high during the Muppet segments, their interest wavered during the "Street" segments, when no Muppets were on screen. This was because the producers had followed the advice of child psychologists who were concerned that children would be confused if human actors and Muppets were shown together. As a result of this decision, the appeal of the test episodes was lower than the target.

The Street scenes, as Palmer described them, were "the glue" that "pulled the show together", so producers knew they needed to make significant changes. On the basis of their experience on Captain Kangaroo, Connell, Stone, and Gibbon thought the experts' opinions were "nonsense"; Cooney agreed. Lesser called their decision to defy the recommendations of their advisers "a turning point in the history of Sesame Street". The producers reshot the Street segments; Henson and his coworkers created Muppets that could interact with the human actors, specifically Oscar the Grouch and Big Bird, who became two of the show's most enduring characters. In addition, the producers found Saunders' role as Gordon not to be as likable by children watching the show, resulting in the character being recast by Matt Robinson, who was initially the show's filmed segments producer. These test episodes were directly responsible for what Gladwell called "the essence of Sesame Street—the artful blend of fluffy monsters and earnest adults". (Note: Lesser later reported that there was no evidence this combination of fantasy and reality confused children, but rather held "considerable appeal".)

== Premiere and first season (1969–1970) ==
Two days before the show's premiere, a thirty-minute preview entitled This Way to Sesame Street aired on NBC. The show was financed by a $50,000 grant from Xerox. Written by Stone and produced by CTW publicist Bob Hatch, it was taped the day before it aired. Newsday called the preview "a unique display of cooperation between commercial and noncommercial broadcasters".

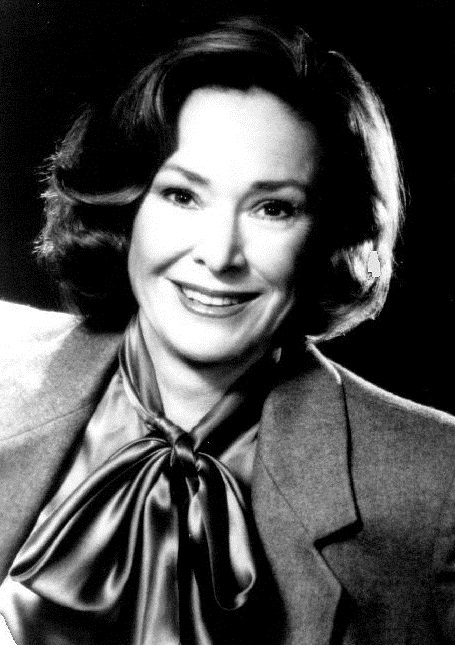
Joan Ganz Cooney, co-creator of Sesame Street and co-founder of the Children's Television Workshop (now known as Sesame Workshop), in 1985

The first season of Sesame Street premiered on November 10, 1969. (Note: See Davis, pp. 192–194 for a description of the first episode, which was sponsored by the letters W, S, and E and the numbers 2 and 3.) It was widely praised for its originality, and was well received by parents as well as children. The show reached only 67.6% of the nation, but earned a 3.3 Nielsen rating, meaning 1.9 million households and 7 million children watched it each day. In Sesame Street's first season, the ETS reported that children who watched the show scored higher in tests than less-frequent viewers.

In November 1970, the cover of Time magazine featured Big Bird, who had received more fan mail than any of the show's human hosts. The magazine declared, "... It is not only the best children's show in TV history, it is one of the best parents' shows as well". An executive at ABC, while recognizing that Sesame Street was not perfect, said the show "opened children's TV to taste and wit and substance" and "made the climate right for improvement". Other reviewers predicted commercial television would be forced to improve its children's programming, something that did not substantially occur until the 1990s. Sesame Street won a Peabody Award, three Emmys, and the Prix Jeunesse award in 1970. President Richard Nixon sent Cooney a congratulatory letter, and Dr. Benjamin Spock predicted the program would result in "better-trained citizens, fewer unemployables in the next generation, fewer people on welfare, and smaller jail populations".

"Sesame Street is ... with lapses, the most intelligent and important program in television. That is, not anything much yet."

— Renata Adler, The New Yorker, 1972

Sesame Street was not without its detractors; there was little criticism of the show in the months following its premiere, but it increased at the end of its first season and beginning of the second season. (Note: See Lesser, pp. 175–201, for his response to the early critics of Sesame Street.) In May 1970, a state commission in Mississippi voted to not air the show on the state's newly launched public television network, which at the time had only one station in Jackson. A member of the commission leaked the vote to The New York Times, stating that "Mississippi was not yet ready" for the show's integrated cast. A commercial television station in Jackson picked up the show instead. Cooney called the ban "a tragedy for both the white and black children of Mississippi". The state commission reversed its decision three weeks later after the vote made national news.

The producers of Sesame Street made a few changes in its second season. Segments that featured children became more spontaneous and allowed more impromptu dialogue, even when it meant cutting other segments. Since federal funds had been used to produce the show, more segments of the population insisted upon being represented on Sesame Street; for example, the show was criticized by Hispanic groups for the lack of Latino characters in the early years of production. A committee of Hispanic activists, commissioned by the CTW in 1970, called Sesame Street "racist" and said the show's bilingual aspects were of "poor quality and patronizing". The CTW responded to these critics by hiring Hispanic actors, production staff, and researchers. By the mid-70s, Morrow reported that "the show included Chicano and Puerto Rican cast members, films about Mexican holidays and foods, and cartoons that taught Spanish words".

While New York Magazine reported criticism of the presence of strong single women in the show, organizations like the National Organization for Women (NOW) expressed concerns that the show needed to be "less male-oriented". For example, members of NOW took exception to the character Susan, who was originally a housewife. They complained about the lack of, as Morrow put it, "credible female Muppets" on the show; Morrow reported that Henson's response was that "women might not be strong enough to hold the puppets over the long hours of taping". The show's producers responded by making Susan a nurse and by hiring a female writer.

== 1970s ==
By the mid-1970s, Sesame Street, according to Davis, had become "an American institution". ETS conducted two "landmark" studies of the show in 1970 and 1971 which demonstrated Sesame Street had a positive educational impact on its viewers. The results of these studies led to the producers securing funding for the show over the next several years, and provided the CTW with additional ways to promote it. By the second season, Sesame Street had become so popular that the design of ETS' experiments to track the show's educational outcomes had to be changed: instead of comparing viewers with a control group of non-viewers, the researchers studied the differences among levels of viewing. They found that children who watched Sesame Street more frequently had a higher comprehension of the material presented.

Producer Jon Stone was instrumental in guiding the show during these years. According to Davis, Stone "gave Sesame Street its soul"; without him "there would not have been Sesame Street as we know it". Frank Oz regarded Stone as "the father of Sesame Street", and Cooney considered Stone "the key creative talent on Sesame Street and "probably the most brilliant writer of children's material in America". Stone was able to recognize and mentor talented people for his crew. He actively hired and promoted women during a time when few women earned top production jobs in television. His policies provided the show with a succession of female producers and writers, many of whom went on to lead the boom in children's programming at Nickelodeon, Disney Channel, and PBS in the 1990s and 2000s. One of these women was Dulcy Singer, who later became the first female executive producer of Sesame Street.

After the show's initial success, its producers began to think about its survival beyond its development and first season and decided to explore other funding sources. The CTW decided to depend upon government agencies and private foundations to develop the show. This would protect it from the financial pressures experienced by commercial networks, but created problems in finding continued support. This era in the show's history was marked by conflicts between the CTW and the federal government; in 1978, the U.S. Department of Education refused to deliver a $2 million check until the last day of the CTW's fiscal year. As a result, the CTW decided to depend upon licensing arrangements, publishing, and international sales for its funding. Henson owned the trademarks to the Muppet characters: he was reluctant to market them at first, but agreed when the CTW promised that the profits from toys, books, and other products were to be used exclusively to fund the CTW. The producers demanded complete control over all products and product decisions; any product line associated with the show had to be educational, inexpensive, and not advertised during its airings. The CTW approached Random House to establish and manage a non-broadcast materials division. Random House and the CTW named Christopher Cerf to assist the CTW in publishing books and other materials that emphasized the curriculum. In 1980, the CTW began to produce a touring stage production based upon the show, written by Connell and performed by the Ice Follies.

"To be frank, I was really surprised, because we thought we were creating the quintessential American show. We thought the Muppets were quintessentially American, and it turns out they're the most international characters ever created."

— Joan Ganz Cooney, speaking of the international co-productions of Sesame Street

Shortly after the premiere of Sesame Street, the CTW was approached by producers, educators, and officials in other nations, requesting that a version of the show be aired in their countries. Former CBS executive Mike Dann left commercial television to become vice-president of the CTW and Cooney's assistant; (Note: Dann called the creation of the CTW "one of the most important breakthroughs in the history of the mass media".) Dann began what Charlotte Cole, vice president for the CTW's International Research department, called the "globalization" of Sesame Street. A flexible model was developed, based upon the experiences of the creators and producers of the original show. The shows came to be called "co-productions", and they contained original sets, characters, and curriculum goals. Depending upon each country's needs and resources, different versions were produced, including dubbed versions of the original show and independent programs. By 2016, 39 different coproductions have been created and produced, "each with its own local name, its own Muppets..., and its own educational objectives designed to meet the educational needs of local children". By its 50th anniversary in 2019, 150 million children viewed over 150 versions of Sesame Street in 70 languages. The New York Times reported in 2005 that income from the CTW's international co-productions of the show was $96 million.

Sesame Street's cast expanded in the 1970s, better fulfilling the show's original goal of greater diversity in both human and Muppet characters. The cast members who joined the show were Sonia Manzano (Maria), who also wrote for the show, Northern Calloway (David), Alaina Reed (Olivia), Emilio Delgado (Luis), Linda Bove (Linda), and Buffy Sainte-Marie (Buffy). In 1973, Roscoe Orman became the third actor to play Gordon.

New Muppet characters were introduced during the 1970s. Count von Count was created and performed by Jerry Nelson, who also voiced Mr. Snuffleupagus, a large Muppet that required two puppeteers to operate. Richard Hunt, who, in Jon Stone's words, joined the Muppets as a "wild-eyed 18-year-old and grew into a master puppeteer and inspired teacher", created Gladys the Cow, Forgetful Jones, Don Music, and the construction worker Sully. Telly Monster was performed by Brian Muehl; Marty Robinson took over the role in 1984. Frank Oz created Cookie Monster. Matt Robinson created the "controversial" (as Davis called him) character Roosevelt Franklin. (Note: See Davis, pp. 247–250, for a discussion about Roosevelt Franklin.) Fran Brill, the first female puppeteer for the Muppets, joined the Henson organization in 1970, and originated the character Prairie Dawn. In 1975, Henson created The Muppet Show, which was filmed and produced in London; Henson brought many of the Muppet performers with him, so opportunities opened up for new performers and puppets to appear on Sesame Street.

The CTW wanted to attract the best composers and lyricists for Sesame Street, so songwriters like Joe Raposo, the show's music director, and writer Jeff Moss were allowed to retain the rights to the songs they wrote. The writers earned lucrative profits, and the show was able to sustain public interest. Raposo's "I Love Trash", written for Oscar the Grouch, was included on the first album of Sesame Street songs, The Sesame Street Book & Record, recorded in 1970. Moss' "Rubber Duckie", sung by Henson for Ernie, remained on the Top-40 Billboard charts for seven weeks that same year. Another Henson song, written by Raposo for Kermit the Frog in 1970, "Bein' Green", which Davis called "Raposo's best-regarded song for Sesame Street", was later recorded by Frank Sinatra and Ray Charles. "Sing", which became a hit for The Carpenters in 1973, and "Somebody Come and Play", were also written by Raposo for Sesame Street.

In 1977 the show became the first to have a depiction of breastfeeding on television.

In 1978, Stone and Singer produced and wrote the show's first special, the "triumphant" Christmas Eve on Sesame Street, which included an O Henry-inspired storyline in which Bert and Ernie gave up their prized possessions—Ernie his rubber ducky and Bert his paper clip collection—to purchase each other Christmas gifts. Bert and Ernie were played by Frank Oz and Jim Henson, who in real life were, like the puppets they played, colleagues and friends. To Davis, this demonstrated the puppeteers' remarkable ability to play "puppetry's Odd Couple". In Singer's opinion, the special—which Stone also wrote and directed—demonstrated Stone's "soul", and Sonia Manzano called it a good example of what Sesame Street was all about. The special won Emmys for Stone and Singer in 1979, beating, among others, the independently produced A Special Sesame Street Christmas for CBS.

By the show's tenth anniversary in 1979, nine million American children under the age of six were watching Sesame Street daily. Four out of five children had watched it over a six-week period, and 90% of children from low-income inner-city homes regularly viewed the show.

== 1980s ==
In 1984, the Federal Communications Commission (FCC) deregulated commercial restrictions on children's television. Advertising during network children's programs almost doubled, and deregulation resulted in an increase in commercially oriented programming. Sesame Street was successful during this era of deregulation despite the fact that the United States government terminated all federal funding of the CTW in 1981. By 1987, the show was earning $42 million per year from its magazine division, book royalties, product licensing, and foreign income—enough to cover two-thirds of its expenses. Its remaining budget, plus a $6 million surplus, was covered by revenue from its PBS broadcasts.

"To look back at that period [the 1980s] is to appreciate the profound effect that life-cycle events had on the show, offstage and on. There was birth and death, love and loss, courtship and calamity, pain and pleasure, all from a little show whose aims at first were simply to test television's ability to stimulate the brain. That it would also touch the heart was not its original intention, but as each year passed, Sesame Street became as much an emotional pathway for children as an intellectual one."

— Michael Davis, Street Gang, p. 277

According to Davis, Sesame Street's second decade was spent "turning inward, expanding its young viewers' world". The show's curriculum grew to include more "affective" teaching—relationships, ethics, and positive and negative emotions. Many of the show's storylines were taken from the experiences of its writing staff, cast, and crew.

In 1982, Will Lee, who had played Mr. Hooper since the show's premiere, died. For the 1983 season, the show's producers and research staff decided they would explain Mr. Hooper's death to their preschool audience, instead of recasting the role: the writer of that episode, Norman Stiles, said, "We felt we owed something to a man we respected and loved". They convened a group of psychologists, religious leaders, and other experts in the field of grief, loss, and separation. The research team conducted a series of studies before the episode to ascertain if children were able to understand the messages they wanted to convey about Mr. Hooper's death; the research showed most children did understand. Parents' reactions to the episode were, according to the CTW's own reports, "overwhelmingly positive". The episode, which won an Emmy, aired on Thanksgiving Day in 1983 so parents could be home to discuss it with their children. Author David Borgenicht called the episode "poignant"; Davis called it "a landmark broadcast" and "a truly memorable episode, one of the show's best". Caroll Spinney, who played Big Bird and who drew the caricatures prominently used in the episode, reported the cast and crew were moved to tears during filming. (Note: For a description of this episode, see Borgenicht, p. 42, and Davis, pp. 281–285.)

In the mid-1980s, Americans were becoming more aware of the prevalence of child abuse, so Sesame Street's researchers and producers decided to "reveal" Mr. Snuffleupagus in 1985. "Snuffy" had never been seen by any of the adults on the show and was considered Big Bird's "imaginary friend". The show's producers were concerned about the message being sent to children; "If children saw that the adults didn't believe what Big Bird said (even though it was true), they would be afraid to talk to adults about dramatic or disturbing things that happened to them".

For the 1988 and 1989 seasons, the topics of love, marriage, and childbirth were addressed when the show presented a storyline in which the characters Luis and Maria fall in love, marry, and have a child named Gabi. Sonia Manzano, the actress who played Maria, had married and become pregnant; according to the book Sesame Street Unpaved, published after the show's thirtieth anniversary in 1999, Manzano's real-life experiences gave the show's writers and producers the idea. Before writing began, research was done to gain an understanding of what previous studies had revealed about preschoolers' understanding of love, marriage, and family. The show's staff found that at the time that there was very little relevant research done about children's understanding of these topics, and no books for children had been written about them. Studies done after the episodes about Maria's pregnancy aired showed that as a result of watching these episodes, children's understanding of pregnancy increased. (Note: See Truglio et al. in Fisch & Truglio, pp. 74–76, for a more detailed discussion. For a description of the wedding episode, which was written by Jeff Moss, see Hellman, p. 53 and Davis, pp. 293–294. Borgenicht, pp. 80–81, gives descriptions of the wedding and of Gabi's birth.)

== 1990s ==
Davis called the 1990s a "time of transition on Sesame Street". Several people involved in the show from its beginnings died during this period: Jim Henson in 1990 at the age of 53 "from a runaway strep infection gone stubbornly, foolishly untreated"; (Note: Davis described Henson's death as "shocking". See Davis, pp. 300–307 for a description of Henson's "moving" memorial service, held at the Cathedral of St. John the Divine in Manhattan on May 21, 1990.) songwriter Joe Raposo from non-Hodgkin's lymphoma fifteen months earlier; long-time cast member Northern Calloway of cardiac arrest in January 1990; (Note: Calloway had suffered from mental illness for many years.) puppeteer Richard Hunt of AIDS in early 1992; CTW founder and producer David Connell of bladder cancer in 1995; director Jon Stone of amyotrophic lateral sclerosis in 1997; and writer Jeff Moss of colon cancer in 1998.

By the early 1990s, Sesame Street was, as Davis put it, "the undisputed heavyweight champion of preschool television". Parade Magazine reported in 2019 that the show's music had been honored with 11 children's Grammys. The show's dominance however, was challenged for the first time by another PBS television show for preschoolers, Barney & Friends, causing Sesame Street's ratings to decline. The producers of Sesame Street responded, at the show's twenty-fifth anniversary in 1993, by expanding and redesigning the show's set, calling it "Around the Corner". With Michael Loman as the new executive producer of the show, new human and Muppet characters were introduced, including Zoe (performed by Fran Brill), baby Natasha and her parents Ingrid and Humphrey, and Ruthie (played by comedian Ruth Buzzi). The "Around the Corner" set was dismantled in 1998. Zoe, one of the few characters that survived, was created to include another female Muppet on the show, to break stereotypes of girls, and to provide female viewers with a positive role model. According to Davis, she was the first character developed on the show by marketing and product development specialists, who worked with the researchers at the CTW. (The quest for a "break-out" female Muppet character continued into 2006 with the creation of Abby Cadabby, who was created after nine months of research.) In 1998, for the first time in the show's history, Sesame Street pursued funding by accepting corporate sponsorship. Consumer advocate Ralph Nader urged parents to protest the move by boycotting the show.

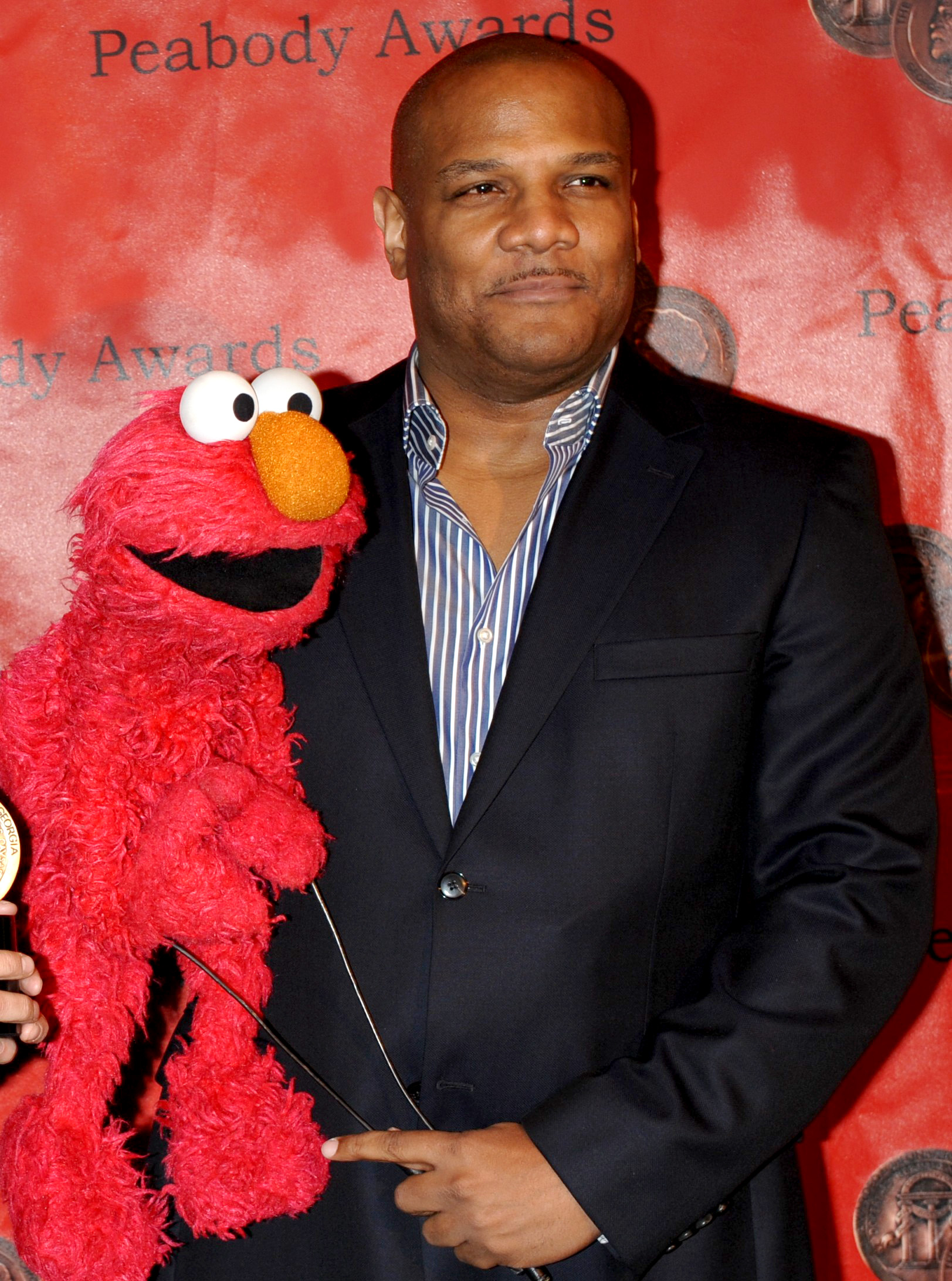
Elmo and his portrayer, Kevin Clash, in 2010.

For Sesame Street's 30th anniversary in 1999, its producers researched the reasons for the show's lower ratings. For the first time since the show debuted, the producers and a team of researchers analyzed Sesame Street's content and structure during a series of two-week-long workshops. They also studied how children's viewing habits had changed since the show's premiere. They found that although Sesame Street was produced for three- to five-year-olds, children began watching it at a younger age. Preschool television had become more competitive, and the CTW's research showed the traditional magazine format was not the best way to attract young children's attention. The growth of home videos during the 1980s and the increase of thirty-minute children's shows on cable had demonstrated that children's attention could be sustained for longer periods of time, but the CTW's researchers found that their viewers, especially the younger ones, lost attention in Sesame Street after 40 to 45 minutes.

Beginning in 1998, a new 15-minute segment shown at the end of each episode, "Elmo's World", used traditional elements (animation, Muppets, music, and live-action film), but had a more sustained narrative. "Elmo's World" followed the same structure each episode, and depended heavily on repetition. (Note: At first, the same segment was repeated daily for a week, but this practice was dropped at the end of the first season of "Elmo's World".) Unlike the realism of the rest of the show, the segment took place in a stylized crayon-drawing universe as conceived by its host. Elmo, who represented the three- to four-year-old child, was chosen as host of the closing segment because he had always tested well with this segment of their audience. He was created in 1980 and originally performed by Brian Muehl, and later Richard Hunt, but did not become what his eventual portrayer, Kevin Clash, called a "phenomenon" until Clash took over the role in 1985. Eventually, Elmo became, as Davis reported, "the embodiment" of Sesame Street, and "the marketing wonder of our age" when five million "Tickle Me Elmo" dolls were sold in 1996. Clash believed the "Tickle Me Elmo" phenomenon made Elmo a household name and led to the "Elmo's World" segment.

== 2000s ==
On June 5, 2000, the Children's Television Workshop changed its name to Sesame Workshop to better reflect its entry into non-television and interactive media. A number of elements related to Sesame Street were adjusted to reflect this change, including replacing the "CTW" initials atop the Sesame Street sign with "123" and www.ctw.org changing its website name to www.sesameworkshop.org. In 2002, Sesame Street's producers went further in changing the show to reflect its younger demographic by fundamentally changing the show's structure, which had relied on "Street scenes" interrupted by live-action videos and animation. The target age for Sesame Street shifted downward, from four years to three years, after the show's 33rd season. As co-executive producer Arlene Sherman stated, "We basically deconstructed the show". The producers expanded upon the "Elmo's World" by changing from a magazine format to a narrative format, which made the show easier for young children to navigate. Sherman called the show's new look "startlingly different". Following its tradition of addressing emotionally difficult topics, Sesame Street's producers chose to address the attacks of 9/11 during this season on its premiere episode, which aired February 4, 2002. This episode, as well as a series of four episodes that aired after Hurricane Katrina in 2005, were used in Sesame Workshop's Community Outreach program.

In 2006, the United States Department of State called Sesame Street "the most widely viewed children's television show in the world". Over half of the show's international co-productions were made after 2001; according to the 2006 documentary The World According to Sesame Street, the events of 9/11 inspired the producers of these co-productions. In 2003, Takalani Sesame, a South African co-production, elicited criticism in the United States when its producers created Kami, the first HIV-positive Muppet, whose purpose was educating children in South Africa about the epidemic of AIDS. The controversy, which surprised Sesame Workshop, was short-lived and died down after Kofi Annan and Jerry Falwell praised the Workshop's efforts. By 2006, Sesame Street had won more Emmy Awards than any other children's show, including winning the outstanding children's series award for twelve consecutive years—every year the Emmys included the category. By 2009, the show had won 118 Emmys throughout its history, and was awarded the Outstanding Achievement Emmy for its 40 years on the air. (Note: As of 2021, Sesame Street has won a total of 205 Emmys.)

The 2008–2009 recession, which led to budget cuts for many nonprofit arts organizations, severely affected Sesame Street; in spring 2009, Sesame Workshop had to lay off 20% of its staff. By the show's 40th anniversary, it was ranked the fifteenth most popular children's show on television. When the show premiered in 1969, 130 episodes a year were produced; starting in 2003, because of rising costs, twenty-six episodes were made. According to the Hollywood Reporter, corporate funding "dried up" and DVD sales "bottomed up". Also by 2009, Sesame Workshop started a new website containing a large library of classic and more recent free video clips, as well as a series of podcasts.

Starting in 2009, the producers of Sesame Street took steps to bring back older viewers; it was also successful in increasing its audience viewership among 3- to 5-year-olds by the end of the 40th season. In 2012, the show's 43rd season, Elmo's World was replaced with Elmo the Musical, which was targeted at the program's older viewers.

== 2010s ==
On October 16, 2011, Sesame Street's YouTube channel was compromised by hackers that deleted the entire channel's uploaded videos and replaced them with pornographic content. The channel was closed down in less than 30 minutes by YouTube due to "repeated or severe violations of our Community Guidelines".

In 2014, in response to increased online and mobile viewing and to the increase in competition from other preschool programs, Sesame Workshop and PBS began producing, airing, and streaming a half-hour version of the program. The hour-long version continued to air on PBS in the mornings and the new version, which consisted of fewer segments, aired in the afternoons, when more children watched television. PBS also began to stream full-length episodes on its website, mobile app, and Roku channel. Also in 2014, Sesame Workshop began an online streaming subscription service called Sesame Go, which aired both old and new episodes of the show. (Note: A year later, in the wake of Sesame Workshop's deal with HBO in 2015, Sesame Workshop began phasing out its subscription service.)

In late 2015, as part of a five-year programming and development deal, it was announced that premium television service HBO would air first-run episodes of Sesame Street. Episodes became available on PBS stations and websites nine months after they aired on HBO. The move came after "sweeping changes in the media business". Sesame Street was operating at a loss of $11 million in 2014; according to the Hollywood Reporter in 2019, it was one of the reasons for the move to HBO the following year. The deal allowed Sesame Workshop to produce more episodes, about 35 new episodes per season, compared to the 18 episodes per season it aired previously, and provided the opportunity to create a spinoff series with the Sesame Street Muppets and a new educational series. Steve Youngwood, SW's Chief Operating Officer, called the move "one of the toughest decisions we ever made". According to The New York Times, the move "drew an immediate backlash". Critics claimed that it favored privileged children over less-advantaged children and their families, the original focus of the show. They also criticized choosing to air first-run episodes on HBO, a network with adult dramas and comedies. In 2017, in response to the changing viewing habits of toddlers, the show's producers decreased its length of episodes presented on all platforms from one hour to thirty minutes, focused on fewer characters, reduced the pop culture references "once included as winks for their parents", and focused "on a single backbone topic".

In April 2017, Sesame Street introduced Julia, the first Muppet with autism. Her puppeteer, Stacey Gordon, is the mother of an autistic son. The character had already been featured in digital and printed storybooks since 2015.

As of its 50th anniversary in 2019, Sesame Street has produced over 4,500 episodes, 35 TV specials, 200 home videos, and 180 albums. Its YouTube channel had almost 5 million subscribers, and the show had 24 million followers on social media. As part of its 50th anniversary PR campaign, Sesame Street conducted a traveling show, featuring some Muppets, between February and December 2019. The "unofficial slogan" of the show's anniversary was "50 Years and Counting", which Underwood called "a nod that we are still going strong".

== 2020s ==
In 2020, CNN had aired a few town hall segments with Sesame Street characters to help children understand difficult topics during the COVID-19 pandemic and Black Lives Matter protests.

On January 29, 2024, the Elmo X (formerly Twitter) account posted: "Elmo is just checking in! How is everybody doing?" The post currently has at least 219 million views, at least 20K comments, and at least 46K quote responses. The response to the post was overwhelming worry, anxiety, and fear, sparking a larger online and multimedia conversation about mental health.Some of the most-viewed responses include the likes of, "Elmo, life is just hard," and "elmo im gonna be real with you, I dont think I can keep living like this, I feel like oscar the grouch in a world of elmo's." The next day, the Elmo account posted: "Wow! Elmo is glad he asked! Elmo learned that it is important to ask a friend how they are doing. Elmo will check in again soon, friends! Elmo loves you." After that, the Sesame Street social media accounts at large posted similar messages of support, and Sesame Workshop made sure to publicize mental health resources.

On October 30, 2023, The Hollywood Reporter reported that Sesame Street would drop its longtime 'magazine' format for season 56 in favor of a more narrative format, which introduces a new animated series, Tales from 123.

On December 13, 2024, it was announced that HBO would be removing Sesame Street from its lineup to "find a new home". However, the episodes will remain in the Max streaming library until 2027.

On May 19, 2025, it was announced that Sesame Street would begin to air new episodes on Netflix starting November 10th, which would also be airing on PBS. To include the acquisition of older episodes by Netflix, new episodes will be released on both platforms on the same day, along with past Sesame Street seasons. In September 2026, Netflix announced the development of a new Sesame Street film.

In August 2025, Sesame Workshop entered a five-year partnership with Phreesia, a healthcare technology company specializing in patient intake and engagement. The collaboration aims to promote pediatric health by delivering educational content featuring Sesame Street characters to families during medical visits.
