= Educational goals of Sesame Street =

Educational goals of an American children's television series

The children's television show Sesame Street, which premiered on public broadcasting television stations in 1969, was the first show of its kind that utilized a detailed and comprehensive educational curriculum, with specific educational goals, in its content. Its goals were garnered from in-house formative research and independent summative evaluations, and its first curriculum was created in a series of five seminars in 1968.

Sesame Street has both cognitive and affective goals. Initially, its producers and researchers focused on their young viewers' cognitive skills, while addressing their affective skills indirectly, because they believed that focusing on cognitive skills would increase children's self-esteem and feelings of competency. They sought to prepare young children for school, especially children from low-income families. The show's producers used modeling, repetition, and humor to fulfill their goals. They made changes in the show's content to increase their viewers' attention and to increase its appeal. They encouraged "co-viewing" to entice older children and parents to watch the show by including humor, cultural references, and celebrities.

After Sesame Street's first season, its producers and researchers began to address affective goals more overtly. They addressed social competence, tolerance of diversity, and nonaggressive ways of resolving conflict, which was depicted through interpersonal disputes among its residents. In the 1980s, the show used the real-life experiences of the show's cast and crew, such as the death of Will Lee (Mr. Hooper) and the pregnancy of Sonia Manzano (Maria) to address affective concerns. In later seasons, Sesame Street addressed real-life disasters such as the September 11 terrorist attacks and Hurricane Katrina.

The show's goals for outreach were addressed during its first season by an extensive and innovative promotional campaign targeted at children and their families in low-income, inner city homes because these groups tended to not watch educational programs on television and because traditional methods of promotion and advertising were not effective with them. In subsequent seasons, the producers developed a series of educational materials used in preschool settings.

== Purpose ==
According to author Malcolm Gladwell, "Sesame Street was built around a single, breakthrough insight: that if you can hold the attention of children, you can educate them". Gerald S. Lesser, the first chair of the advisory board of the Children's Television Workshop (the CTW, or "the Workshop"), the organization that oversaw the show's production, stated that to be effective as an educational tool, television needed to capture, focus, and sustain children's attention. Sesame Street was the first children's show that paid attention to the structure of each episode and made "small but critical adjustments" to each segment to capture children's attention.

Sesame Street was one of the few children's television programs that utilized a detailed and comprehensive educational curriculum, with specific educational goals, in its content. The show's goals were garnered from in-house formative research which informed and improved production, and independent summative evaluations conducted by the Educational Testing Service (ETS) during the show's first two seasons that measured the program's educational effectiveness. The first curriculum was created in a series of five seminars, led by Lesser and attended by Sesame Street's new creative staff and by educational and child development specialists, in 1968. The participants generated long lists of goals, which the Workshop organized into five categories. Eventually, these categories were whittled down to four: symbolic representation, cognitive processes, the physical environment, and the social environment. (Note: See "G" is for Growing, pp. 31–34 for a complete list of curriculum topics for seasons 1–30.) The show's curriculum was eventually restated to identify the writers' goals instead of the child's. (Note: For example, in 1969, one of their goals was "The child can label the physical world around him: Land, Sky, and Water". A similar goal in 2009 was stated this way: "Help children sustain and develop their innate sense of wonder and curiosity about the natural world".)

== Cognitive goals ==
Lesser reported in his 1974 book, Children and Television: Lessons Learned From Sesame Street, written to document the development of the show and the CTW, that one of the goals of the show's creators was "the fundamental purpose of preparing children for school". They were aware of the "individual suffering and frustration" of the child who was ill-prepared for the demands of school, so they sought to instill in their young viewers an appetite for learning. Two related goals were providing their viewers with basic educational skills, which Lesser insisted was valuable to inner-city parents, and teaching children both what and how to think. The show's creators decided to only include in their curriculum the range of skills of the three to five-year-old child, and not focus on skills they already had, or on skills beyond their reach.

Sesame Street's creators recognized that television lent itself well to the use of modelling as a teaching tool. They understood that children tended to imitate what they saw on the screen, so many writing and production methods were used to directly model effective verbal communication. Indirect modeling, without explicit labeling, was used to demonstrate positive behaviors as well. One of the positive behaviors they modeled was inquisitiveness and the enjoyment of learning. If humor, for example, interfered with the intended instructional message or exhibited inappropriate behavior, it was removed. As Muppet performer Fran Brill explained, the show's puppeteers demonstrated emotions by banging their puppets' heads against the wall or by having them fall backwards, but when research found that these behaviors did not demonstrate good models of appropriate behavior, these behaviors were changed. The Muppet Roosevelt Franklin, for example, was removed from the show because many leaders in the African American community felt that he displayed negative cultural stereotypes.

The creators of Sesame Street believed that young children were easily distracted by peripheral details and were unable to selectively attend to the most useful aspects of what they observed, so they gave special care to, as Lesser put it, "make salient what the child is expected to learn". They eliminated irrelevant and distracting content without making the content uninteresting, especially in repeated viewings. The content they presented had to compete with the distractions that occurred as a result of viewing at home, so they realized that the show had to have high appeal. They found, however, that the relationship between appeal and comprehension was more complicated than they initially thought, and discovered that young children probably did not attend to material that was presented at a higher level than they were ready to understand. The Workshop's researchers found that by crafting the show's segments, children's verbal participation and interaction could be increased, which addressed their critics' concerns about children's passivity while watching television.

Repetition was a convention used often on Sesame Street. The creators understood that repetition gave young children opportunities to practice new skills and assisted them in making a connection between new and unfamiliar concepts. They observed that children seemed to enjoy some material more after viewing them several times, and allowed them to predict and anticipate the outcome of a sequence. Repetition made it easier to teach complex concepts or situations a child would not be able to comprehend from a single viewing, and allowed children to explore different facets of a subject. In the early years of Sesame Street, the producers took advantage of repetition as an effective teaching tool by often repeating the same segment many times during the course of an episode; in the first ten seasons, one in six segments was a repeat of an earlier one. The Workshop also learned that varying the details while repeating the same format was also an effective use of repetition.

Television historian Robert W. Morrow saw what he called "the often repeated alphabet recitation segment" as an example of the show's use of repetition. For example, in a short film in which actor James Earl Jones recited the alphabet, Jones made long pauses before each letter, which were superimposed in a corner of the screen moments before he said it. According to Cooney, some educational advisors recommended against using Jones, thinking that he would frighten young viewers, but children ended up loving his segments. The producers found that children who had seen the segment a few times said the letter before Jones did, and Jones often served as confirmation or correction. The producers viewed this as a way to make television more interactive, and dubbed it "the James Earl Jones effect".

Humor was used on Sesame Street to both attract the attention of its young viewers and to, as Lesser put it, "entice parents and older siblings to share the young child's viewing", called "coviewing" by Truglio and Fisch. (Note: By 2019, 80% of parents watched Sesame Street with their children, and 650 celebrities had appeared on the show.) Jim Henson's characters and humor were instrumental in creating the show's "two-tiered audience" of younger and older viewers. Lesser went so far as to state that educational television was "completely dependent upon the effective use of humor". Lesser also stated that in order for comedy to be an effective teaching tool, it had to coincide with the lesson being taught. Although critics complained that slapstick was too violent for children's television, the Workshop found that it was the most effective comedy form they used, and as Lesser said, "a favorite with preschoolers". Morrow reported that the only violence depicted on Sesame Street was "slapstick punctuation", and that it was used only in animations and short films.

Another way the Workshop encouraged co-viewing was through the use of cultural references that only adults would understand. Celebrities familiar to adults and older children also appeared on the show. Cooney's previous documentary production experience and producer Dave Connell's "wide ranging contacts in the media" resulted in successful bookings of celebrities on the show, even before the show became successful. As of 2009, over 500 celebrities had appeared on Sesame Street.

== Affective goals ==
At first, the creators of Sesame Street addressed "affective goals" indirectly, believing that focusing on cognitive and educational goals would naturally increase children's self-esteem and feelings of competency. Their viewers' racial identities were addressed by integrating the show with, at first, black and white actors and performers. Eventually their critics during the show's first season forced the Workshop to address affective goals more overtly, which occurred after "extensive research and planning". The affective goals they addressed were social competence, tolerance of diversity, and nonaggressive ways of resolving conflict, which was depicted through interpersonal disputes among its residents, making Sesame Street an "idealized place of child empowerment".

According to Davis, Sesame Street's curriculum began addressing affective goals more overtly during the 1980s, when the show focused on "turning inward, expanding its young viewers' world". Davis reported that their affective goals were inspired by the experiences of its writing staff, cast, and crew. For example, in one of the show's landmarks, the producers addressed grief after the 1982 death of Will Lee, who had played Mr. Hooper since the show's premiere. (Note: For a description of this episode, see Borgenicht, p. 42, and Davis, pp. 281–285.) In 1985, Sesame Street addressed adoption with Gordon and Susan's adoption of Miles. They emphasized adoption's effect on parenting, family relationships, including sibling rivalry focusing on how Miles' addition affected Big Bird and other Muppet characters, and how he changed his working parents' lives. The Associated Press reported that the show's producers, after "extensive research", chose not to refer to Miles' biological parents because child development experts thought it might frighten young children.

For the 1988 and 1989 seasons, the topics of love, marriage, and childbirth were addressed when the producers created a storyline in which the characters Luis and Maria fall in love, marry, and have a child, Gabi. Sonia Manzano, the actress who played Maria, had married and became pregnant; according to the book Sesame Street Unpaved, published after the show's thirtieth anniversary in 1999, Manzano's real-life experiences gave the show's writers and producers the idea. Research was done before any scripts were written to gain an understanding of the previous studies about preschoolers' understanding of love, marriage, and family. The show's research staff found that at the time, there was very little relevant research done about children's understanding of these topics, and no books for children had been written about them. Studies done after the episodes about Maria's pregnancy aired showed that as a result of watching these episodes, children's understanding of pregnancy increased. (Note: See Truglio et al., pp. 74–76, for a more detailed discussion. Also see Hellman, p. 53 and Davis, pp. 293–294, for a description of the wedding episode, written by Jeff Moss, and Borgenicht, pp. 80–81, for descriptions of the wedding and of Gabi's birth.)

Another way Sesame Street addressed affective goals was by addressing real-life disasters. For example, the producers addressed the September 11 terrorist attacks with an episode that aired in early 2002. They also produced a series of four episodes that aired after Hurricane Katrina in 2005. These episodes were used in Sesame Workshop's Community Outreach program.

Gikow called writer Emily Perl Kingsley an "expert" at interpreting the show's curriculum goals surrounding tolerance, diversity, and inclusion, especially as it related to the disability community. Kingsley has been a leader in the Workshop for ensuring that people with disabilities were included in the show. For example, she hired the Little Theater of the Deaf to appear on Sesame Street, and was instrumental in the addition of Deaf actress Linda Bove to its cast. Kingsley's son Jason, who had Down syndrome, also appeared several times on the show. As Kingsley reported, "...Sesame Street has a better record than any other show in the history of television of doing this on a regular basis in a comfortable kind of way".

== Outreach ==
Sesame Street focused on children from disadvantaged backgrounds, but the show's creators recognized that in order to achieve the kind of success they wanted, they needed to encourage all children, no matter what their background, to watch it. At the same time, however, their primary goal was to make the show appealing to inner-city families, a group that did not traditionally watch educational programs on public television. As Lesser stated, "If the series did not work for poor children, the entire project would fail". Morrow called the new show's audience "concentric", with its targeted audience, "the urban poor", within the larger circle of all preschoolers.

The Workshop devoted 8% of their initial budget to advertise the new show. In what Morrow called "an extensive campaign" that Lesser stated "would demand at least as much ingenuity as production and research", they promoted the show with educators and the broadcast industry. The Workshop understood that a special effort had to be made to reach their target community because traditional methods of promotion and advertising were not effective with these groups. To get the word out to their target audience in the inner cities, they hired Evelyn Davis from the Urban League, whom Michael Davis called "remarkable, unsinkable, and indispensable", as the Workshop's first Vice President of Community Relations and head of the Workshop's Community Educational Services (CES) division.

After Sesame Street's popularity became established after its first season, the CES' outreach efforts turned from promotion to the development of educational materials used in preschool settings. The child-care community eventually became the CES' "core constituency". Early outreach efforts included mobile viewing units that broadcast the show in the inner cities, in Appalachia, in Native American communities, and in migrant worker camps. In the early 1980s, the CES developed into the Sesame Street Preschool Education Program (PEP), whose goal was to assist preschools, by combining television viewing, books, hands-on activities, and other media, in using the show as an educational resource.

The Workshop's outreach programs included providing materials to non-English speaking children and adults. Instead of following the traditional practice of translating their English materials into Spanish, for example, they employed what they called "versioning", or creating parallel sets of materials that conveyed the same content and messages in culturally and linguistically relevant ways. Starting in 2006, the Workshop expanded its outreach by creating a series of PBS specials and DVD focusing on how military deployment affects the families of soldiers. The Workshop's outreach efforts also focused on families of prisoners, health and wellness, and safety.

In 2013, SW started Sesame Street in Communities, a branch of their outreach efforts. Sesame Street in Communities, working with caregivers and community organizations, provided resources to help families dealing with difficult issues. It provided hundreds of multi-media tools (videos, storybooks, games, activities, and other resources), in both English and Spanish. Its topics included teaching early literacy and math concepts, nutritious eating, divorce, exercise, exploring emotions, grief, divorce, and food insecurity. It got most of its funding from the Robert Wood Johnson Foundation and other organizations. In 2017, Sesame Street in Communities, starting in three pilot sites in Guilford County, North Carolina, Kansas City, Missouri, and Los Angeles, planned to expand to over 35 more communities, work with over 11,000 direct service providers, and reach 4.5 million children under the age of 6 and their families.
