= Norman Stiles =

Television writer (born 1942)

- Born: December 4, 1942 (age 83)
- Occupation: Television writer
- Years active: 1971–1997
- Known for: Sesame Street

Norman Stiles (born December 4, 1942) is a television writer best known for his work on the show Sesame Street. Stiles worked on the show from 1971 until 1997.

Stiles, a native of New York City, is perhaps best known for writing the episode segments about the death of the character Mr. Hooper (whose actor, Will Lee, had died of a heart attack in 1982). Stiles wanted to convey that expressing grief for someone who had died was difficult for both adults and children. Instead of providing an explanation, the adults of Sesame Street tell Big Bird, when he asked why Mr. Hooper had died, that there was no real reason, that it happened, as Gordon tells Big Bird, "Just because". The show's outside experts advised Stiles and the producers to remove the line because they were concerned that an open-ended explanation would not be enough for children, but Stiles kept the line because it was an acknowledgement.

As part of the Sesame Street writing team, Stiles received eight Daytime Emmy Awards. He also wrote for NBC's 1976–1977 situation comedy The Practice. In 2011, he participated in the Old Jews Telling Jokes program adapted from the book by Eric Spiegelman and shown in the United Kingdom on BBC Four.
