= Will Lee =

American actor (1908–1982)

- Lee as Mr. Hooper on Sesame Street
- Born: William Lubovsky; August 6, 1908; Brooklyn, New York, U.S.
- Died: December 7, 1982 (aged 74); New York City, U.S.
- Occupation: Actor
- Years active: 1930–1982

William Lee (né Lubovsky; August 6, 1908 – December 7, 1982) was an American actor who appeared in numerous television and film roles, but was best known for playing Mr. Hooper, the original store proprietor of the eponymous Hooper's Store. He was one of the four original human characters on Sesame Street, from the show's debut on November 10, 1969 until his death on December 7, 1982, at the age of 74.

== Early career ==
Lee was born to a Jewish family in Brooklyn, New York on August 6, 1908. His father, a bookbinder, lost his job due to economic changes. Will Lee came to adulthood during the Great Depression. He worked odd jobs in New York City and absorbed the intellectual atmosphere of Greenwich Village, an enclave of avant-garde culture where small presses, art galleries, and experimental theater thrived. He began his career as a character actor on stage. He was a member of the Group Theater in the 1930s and appeared in Johnny Johnson, Night Music, Boy Meets Girl, The Time of Your Life (as Willie the pinball machine addict) and other Broadway plays. He succeeded John Garfield as the lead in Golden Boy. He also was involved in the Workers Lab Theatre, by presenting plays that supported the labor movement and social justice.

Lee was co-founder of the Theater of Action and a member of the Federal Theatre Project. During World War II, he served in Army Special Services in Australia and Manila and was cited twice for directing and staging shows for troops overseas, as well as teaching acting classes.

After the war, he appeared Off Broadway in Norman Mailer's The Deer Park (as movie mogul Teppis) and on Broadway in The Shrike, Once Upon a Mattress, Carnival!, Incident At Vichy, and The World of Sholom Aleichem.

=== Blacklist and teaching ===
Lee also began appearing in movies, including bit parts in Casbah, A Song Is Born, Little Fugitive, and Saboteur. He was blacklisted as an alleged communist and barred from movies and TV for five years during the era of McCarthyism, according to members of his family. He had been active in the Actor's Workshop and had been an unfriendly witness before the House Un-American Activities Committee hearings in 1950 investigating Communist elements in show business. At the end of that period, in 1956, he landed the role of Grandpa Hughes in As the World Turns; however, the role was later recast with Santos Ortega.

He taught at the American Theatre Wing for nine years (including among his students James Earl Jones), as well as at the New School for Social Research, Boston University, and the Uta Hagen-Herbert Berghof Studio. In addition, he conducted his own acting classes. Outside of Sesame Street, later roles included TV movies and a supporting role as the judge in the 1983 movie Daniel. Lee also worked in commercials, including a spot for Atari, as a grandfather learning to play Pac-Man from his granddaughter and spots for Ocean Spray juice.

=== Impact of Mr. Hooper ===
In 1969, he pursued the role of Mr. Hooper on the popular children's show Sesame Street. "He gave millions of children the message that the old and the young have a lot to say to each other," said Joan Ganz Cooney, president of the Children's Television Workshop (later known as Sesame Workshop). The New York Times reported that on Sesame Street, Lee's Mr. Hooper ranked ahead of all live cast members in recognition by young audiences, according to a survey. His bowtie and horn-rimmed reading glasses became his trademark.

In a November 1970 TIME article, following the show's first season, Lee recalled his feelings about the show:

I was delighted to take the role of Mr. Hooper, the gruff grocer with the warm heart. It's a big part, and it allows a lot of latitude. But the show has something extra, that sense you sometimes get from great theater, the feeling that its influence never stops.

In addition to being a staple of Sesame Street for more than 10 years, Lee played Mr. Hooper in TV specials (Christmas Eve on Sesame Street and A Special Sesame Street Christmas), guest appearances (Evening at Pops: 1971), stage appearances, countless record albums, and parades, including the 1982 Macy's Thanksgiving Day Parade on November 25, 1982. It was revealed in Christmas Eve on Sesame Street that Mr. Hooper is Jewish, as was Lee himself. Lee taped his final segments as Mr. Hooper on Wednesday November 24, 1982, two weeks prior to his death. This would become the focal point of Episode 1839, which aired a year later to the date, in which Mr. Hooper's death is explained by the adults to Big Bird, who had a particularly close relationship with Mr. Hooper.

According to his obituary in The New York Times, as he became known on Sesame Street, children would approach him on the street and ask, "How did you get out of the television set?" or whisper, "I love you." "Apart from the joy of knowing that you are helping so many kids, the recognition is heartwarming," Lee was quoted as saying in 1981.

=== Death of Mr. Hooper ===
Following Lee's death, the producers of Sesame Street faced the challenge of how to address the absence of one of the series' most prominent characters. After deliberating various approaches, such as recasting Mr. Hooper, having him move interstate, or retire, they decided to have the character of Mr. Hooper die as well and air an episode addressing the difficult topic of death.

Episode 1839, colloquially known as "Farewell, Mr. Hooper," aired on November 24, 1983 (Thanksgiving Day) and was quickly selected by the Daytime Emmys as being one of the 10 most influential moments in daytime television. Before the broadcast ended, a picture of Lee was shown, along with the dates of his birth and death and the writing "In Loving Memory of Will Lee" before fading out.

The cast of Sesame Street were saddened by Lee's death, as over the time Lee had played his signature character on TV, he had befriended most of the cast. The cast said that their characters' sad faces were real but they went through with their performance, remembering they were doing it for a good outcome. Caroll Spinney (Big Bird and Oscar the Grouch) said that the last time he saw Lee alive was during the taping of the last episode involving Mr. Hooper in November 1982. Lee felt ill that day and barely spoke to the cast. Spinney (who was wearing Big Bird's feet at the time) placed his arm around Lee's shoulder and said "I love you, Mr. Hooper." Lee replied, "And I love you, Caroll." Lee died a few days later.

In an interview a few years later, Loretta Long, who played Susan, said of the episode's legacy: "People come up to us and say 'Thank you. Now we can explain what happened to Grandma, what happened to Grandpa.'"

== Personal life and death ==
Lee died on December 7, 1982, at the age of 74, from a heart attack at Lenox Hill Hospital in New York City. According to his obituary, he was survived by his sister Sophie Lee Lubov, who lived in Florida. The Sesame Street episode "Farewell, Mr. Hooper", episode 1983, was released 11 months later and is dedicated to Lee.

== Filmography ==
=== Film ===
Year	Title	Role	Notes
1941	Whistling in the Dark	Herman	
1941	Melody Lane	Mr. Russo	
1941	Babes on Broadway	Shorty	Uncredited
1941	Ball of Fire	Benny "the Creep"	
1942	Saboteur	Rogers	Uncredited
1947	Brute Force	Convict in Chow Line	Uncredited
1948	Casbah	Beggar	
1948	They Live by Night	Jeweler	
1948	A Song Is Born	Waiter at the Dixieland Club	Uncredited
1948	Force of Evil	Waiter	Uncredited
1949	The Life of Riley	Waiter	Uncredited
1949	The Lone Wolf and His Lady	The Waiter	Uncredited
1950	Backfire	Cab driver	Uncredited
1950	Shakedown	Cabbie	Uncredited
1953	Little Fugitive	Photographer	
1963	An Affair of the Skin	Waiter	
1982	Hit and Run	Joseph Kahn	Posthumous
1982	Daniel	The Judge	(final film role; posthumous)

=== Television ===
Year	Title	Role(s)	Notes
1950	Dick Tracy	Reg Prof	Episode: "The Mole: Part 1"
1950	The Philco Television Playhouse		Episode: "Decoy"
1956, 1982	As the World Turns	Grandpa Hughes #1 (1956); Will "Pa" (1982)	2 episodes
1964	East Side/West Side	Nat (Grocer); Schultz	2 episodes
1965	For the People	Kurawicz	Episode: "The Influence of Fear"
1969–1982	Sesame Street	Mr. Hooper	Series Regular
1974	Great Performances	Kon	Episode: "Enemies"
1978	Christmas Eve on Sesame Street	Mr. Hooper	Christmas special
1978	A Special Sesame Street Christmas	Mr. Hooper	Christmas special
1979	A Walking Tour of Sesame Street	Mr. Hooper	Television special
1980	Playing for Time	Shmuel	Television movie

== Stage ==
Year	Title	Role(s)	Venue	Ref.
1935	The Young Go First	Beebie Menucci	Park Theatre, Broadway	
1936	Triple-A Plowed Under	Ensemble	Biltmore Theatre, Broadway	
1936	Johnny Johnson	Photographer, Private Goldberger	44th Street Theatre, Broadway	
1937	Golden Boy	Siggie (replacement)	Belasco Theatre, Broadway	
1939	Family Portrait	Mendel	Morosco Theatre, Broadway	
1939	The Time of Your Life	Willie	Booth Theatre, Broadway	
1940	Night Music	Waiter	National Theatre, Broadway	
1940	Heavenly Express	"Shorty" Rucker	Broadhurst Theatre, Broadway	
1942	Lily of the Valley	Joe	Windsor Theatre, Broadway	
1942	The Strings, My Lord, Are False	Louis Liebens	Royale Theatre, Broadway	
1947	As We Forgive Our Debtors	Odin Sturkelson	Princess Theatre, Broadway	
1948	Strange Bedfellows	Mayor Ambrose Tibbett	Morosco Theatre, Broadway	
1952	The Shrike	Sam Tager	Cort Theatre, Broadway	
1959	Once Upon A Mattress	King Sextimus (standby, replacement)	Phoenix Theatre, Broadway	
1961	Carnival!	Grobert	Imperial Theatre, Broadway	
1964	The Last Analysis	Aufschnitt	Belasco Theater, Broadway	
1964	Incident at Vichy	Old Jew	ANTA Washington Square Theatre, Broadway	
1967	The Deer Park	Teppis	Theater de Lys, Off-Broadway	
1972	Enemies	Kon	Vivian Beaumont Theater, Broadway	

== See also ==
- History of Sesame Street
