= Street Gang =

Non-fiction book by Michael Davis

Street Gang: The Complete History of Sesame Street
- Street Gang: The Complete History of Sesame Street
- Author: Michael Davis
- Language: English
- Published: 2008
- Publisher: Viking Press
- Publication place: United States
- Pages: 380
- ISBN: 9780670019960
- Dewey Decimal: 791.4372 (Alameda County Library)

Street Gang: The Complete History of Sesame Street is a nonfiction book that chronicles the history of the children's television program Sesame Street. Street Gang is journalist and writer Michael Davis's first book, published by Viking Press in 2008. On bookshelves in time for the show's 40th anniversary in 2009, the book developed out of a TV Guide article Davis wrote to commemorate the show's 35th anniversary in 2004. Davis spent five years researching and writing the book, and conducted hundreds of interviews with the show's creators, cast, and crew.

Street Gang begins with a description of Muppet creator Jim Henson's 1990 funeral, from the perspective of co-creator Joan Ganz Cooney. The first twelve chapters describe the origin, development, and early years of Sesame Street and the Children's Television Workshop, the organization created to oversee the production of the show and other projects. Davis includes the biographies of many of the key people involved with the creation and production of Sesame Street. Subsequent chapters chronicle the rest of the show's history, up to its 40th anniversary in 2009.

Reviews of Street Gang were mostly positive. Most reviewers were impressed by Davis' research and attention to detail, but some felt it was too episodic and more an oral account than a dispassionate history of the show's history. One reviewer predicted that the book would become the definitive source of Sesame Street. Street Gang was made into an audiobook, narrated by Caroll Spinney, the same day it was published. A second edition was published later that year. The 2021 documentary Street Gang: How We Got to Sesame Street, directed by Marilyn Agrelo, is based on the book.

== Background ==
Michael Davis, a senior editor for TV Guide from 1998 to 2007, wrote an article in the magazine in 2004 to commemorate the 35th anniversary of the children's television show Sesame Street . Street Gang developed out of the article. Davis spent five years researching and writing the book and worked with the cooperation of co-creator Joan Ganz Cooney.

In 2009, Sesame Street celebrated its 40th anniversary. It was the fifteenth-highest-rated children's television show in the United States, and had won eight Grammy Awards. By 2009, the show had won 122 Emmy Awards. By 2006, independently produced versions, or "co-productions", of Sesame Street were broadcast in twenty countries. In 2001, there were over 120 million viewers of these international versions, and by 2009, it was broadcast in more than 140 countries. A 1996 survey found that 95% of all American preschoolers had watched the show by the time they were three years old. In 2008, it was estimated that 77 million Americans had watched the series as children.

== Summary ==
Prologue: A description of the funeral of Muppet creator Jim Henson in New York City in 1990, from the viewpoint of Joan Ganz Cooney, one of the creators of Sesame Street.

Chapters 1—12: The origins and development of the show and the creation of the Children's Television Workshop (CTW). Sesame Street was created after a dinner party hosted by Cooney and her husband in early 1966, attended by Carnegie Foundation vice-president Lloyd Morrisett and Cooney's boss at New York City educational television station WNDT, Lewis Freedman. The discussion inspired them to create a children's television program, different from what was offered at the time, that could "master the addictive qualities of television" and help young children, especially from low-income families, learn and prepare for school. Davis includes the biographies of key players in the show's development: Cooney, Morrisett, Jon Stone, Sam Gibbon, Tom Whedon, Evelyn Payne Davis, Jim Henson, Caroll Spinney, Gerald S. Lesser, Edward Palmer, Joe Raposo, Loretta Long, Bob McGrath, Will Lee, and Matt Robinson. There is also a discussion of the history of early children's television, specifically Captain Kangaroo and The Howdy Doody Show. Davis emphasizes the coincidence that many involved with the show had first names that started with the letter J: Joan Cooney, Jon Stone, Jim Henson, Jerry Nelson, and Joe Raposo.

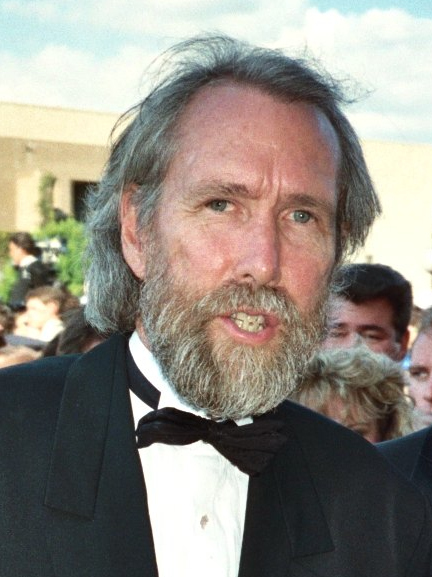
Jim Henson, creator of the Muppets, in 1989. Street Gang opens with a description of Henson's 1990 funeral.

Chapter 13 ("Intermission"): A description of the first episode of Sesame Street, which debuted on PBS on November 10, 1969. As Davis states, "To see that first episode today—and the four succeeding ones in Sesame's first week—is to be transported back to 1969". The first show was sponsored by the letters W, S, and E and by the numbers 2 and 3.

Chapter 14: The influence of Sesame Street during its first season, and a description of its success and critics.

Chapters 15—16: The 1970s. These chapters include a description of the production team, the cast who joined the show, and the Muppets created during this time, including Cookie Monster and Roosevelt Franklin. The biographies that Davis depicts are of Dulcy Singer, Christopher Cerf, Sonia Manzano, Northern Calloway, Emilio Delgado, Linda Bove, Richard Hunt, and Fran Brill. Davis describes the music of Sesame Street, Jim Henson's struggle with fame, the end of Cooney's marriage, and CTW's funding difficulties.

Chapter 17: The late 70s and 1980s. Davis describes the production of the show's first special in 1978 (Christmas Eve on Sesame Street), the decompensation and death of Calloway in 1989, the death of Lee in 1989 and the groundbreaking way Sesame Street dealt with it, the creation of Elmo and biography of his portrayer, Kevin Clash, and the wedding of Maria and Luis in 1988. Davis calls the show's depiction of Mr. Hooper's death and the wedding "the poles that held up the canvas tent that was Sesame Street in the 1980s, a reflection of the sometimes silly, sometimes sad, always surprising, relentlessly spinning cyclical circus of life". The biography of Alison Bartlett is also described.

Chapter 18: The 1990s and 2000s. This chapter describes the cast's responses to the deaths of Calloway, Henson, Raposo, Connell, and Stone. It discusses Henson's business dealings with Disney in 1990, a few months before Henson's death, and Sesame Street's ratings decrease. In 1993, the show went through substantial changes in response to its decline ("Around the Corner"); the only thing that ultimately survived the restructuring was the Muppet character Zoe, performed by Brill. There were also attempts to include more female Muppet characters. Davis discusses the "Tickle Me Elmo" phenomenon of Christmas 1996, Avenue Q, "Elmo's World", and the character Mr. Noodle.

Epilogue: Davis ends his book as he begins it, focusing on Joan Ganz Cooney, during her retirement years. He also discusses the development of Sesame Street's newest character, Abby Cadabby, and the show's international influence.

== Critical reception ==
Judith Fitzgerald of The Philadelphia Inquirer, who predicts that Street Gang will become the definitive source of the show, calls "a compulsively readable compendium of all things Sesame Street", as well as informative, heartbreaking, hilarious, and eye-opening". She credits its complicated and often funny story with the cooperation Davis received from Cooney when writing his book. Fitzgerald also praises Davis, calling him "a sensitive and subtly brilliant writer who conveys the soul of the program". Reviewer Drew Toal calls Street Gang a "swift narrative" and "a sensitive, honest account", and credits the large number of cast stories and amount of controversy recounted in the book with the hundreds of interviews Davis conducted. Frazier Moore of the Associated Press states that the book is a fascinating account of the creation of Sesame Street, and that Davis writes thoroughly and with affection.

James Panero, reviewer for The New York Times, called Street Gang a "behind the lens story" and the "first comprehensive account" of Sesame Street. Panero found Davis' history tireless, but objected to Davis' emphasis in unimportant details. As a result, and due to Davis' inclusion of every anecdote and biography of everyone involved with its creation and history, Panero considers the book an oral history rather than a tightly organized narrative. Other reviewers note that Street Gang is too much like its subject, episodic and unfocused. Diana Wagman of The L.A. Times states that Davis choice of what to focus on is odd; for example, there is a great deal of focus in the book on things like the licensing and merchandising agreement of the Muppets, but very little attention on Mississippi's 1970 ban of the show. Wagman states, "Yes, we get a little past-tense womanizing, a lot of drinking and a psychotic breakdown later in the book, but it all seems sad, not salacious, and not germane to the basic story". Nick Gillespie of The Washington Post agrees. He calls Jim Henson, who is mentioned often in the book, "an almost completely enigmatic character".

Wagman takes issue with the way Davis moves from topic to topic and time period to time period. Davis gives long personal histories of the principal players in his history, but fails to explain why they are important, and is compelled to repeat every positive claim made about Sesame Street. In spite of this, Wagman states, Davis demonstrates the love and respect Cooney and the show's cast and crew had for each other. For example, when Calloway was diagnosed with a mental illness, the show never fired him, and Wagman calls Henson's funeral "heartbreaking". Gillespie finds the "nasty backstage wrangling" and behind-the-scenes stories compelling. Alex Altman of Time Magazine agrees, and calls Davis "an unabashed fan of the show's charms rather than a dispassionate historian". He also considers Davis' use of language breathless and his portrayals of the show's creators overly flattering.

Reviewer Molly O'Donnell states that the book is "broad in scope yet exercises a meticulous attention to detail". O'Donnell views Davis as balanced because although Davis praises Sesame Street, he describes the public criticism the show has received and the personality flaws of the people who helped create it. Even with the book's lulls, which O'Donnell attributes to the large number of personal histories Davis must tell to give a complete picture of the show's creation, she says that the book is interesting. The reviewer from Publishers Weekly agrees, praising Street Gang as continuously interesting, honest, and well-researched. The reviewer goes on to state, "Any grown-up fan will relish this account, gaining an even greater appreciation for the cultural contributions of Kermit, Big Bird, Oscar the Grouch and all their neighbors".

== Publication history ==
The publication of the book was announced in 2006 by the television industry trade magazine Broadcasting and Cable, which anticipated a buzz about the project. The magazine stated, "A dozen of New York’s top publishers are eager to get their hands this week on the story of how Sesame Street emerged as the iconic program that shaped the minds of countless kiddies around the globe".

The audio version of Street Gang, narrated by Caroll Spinney, was released at the same time as the book.

A documentary, based in part by Davis' book, was under production in 2017. Street Gang: How We Got to Sesame Street was released in 2021.

== Works cited ==
Davis, Michael (2008). Street Gang: The Complete History of Sesame Street. New York: Viking. ISBN 9780670019960.
