= Influence of Sesame Street =

Overview of Sesame Street's influence

The children's television program Sesame Street premiered in 1969 to high ratings, positive reviews, and some controversy, which have continued during its history. Even though the show aired on only 67% of American televisions at the time of its premiere, it earned a 3.3 Nielsen rating, or 1.9 million households. By its tenth anniversary in 1979, 9 million American children under the age of six were watching Sesame Street daily. Its ratings declined in the 1990s, due to societal changes. A survey conducted in 1996 found that by the age of three, 95% of all American children had watched it. By its fortieth anniversary in 2009, it was ranked the fifteenth most popular children's show.

According to writer Michael Davis, Sesame Street is "perhaps the most vigorously researched, vetted, and fretted-over program". By 2001, there were over 1,000 research studies regarding its efficacy, impact, and effect on American culture. Two landmark summative evaluations, conducted by the Educational Testing Service (ETS) in 1970 and 1971, demonstrated that Sesame Street had a significant educational impact on its viewers. Additional studies conducted throughout the show's history demonstrated that the show continued to have a positive effect on its young viewers.

Sesame Street has also been the subjects of many controversies throughout its long run on television. In 1970, a commission in Mississippi voted to exclude the show from its state educational TV programming. The controversy surrounding the show stemmed from cultural and historical reasons regarding children and television's effect on them. Latino and feminists groups criticized Sesame Street for its depictions of some groups, but its producers have worked to address their concerns throughout the years. By 2009, Sesame Street had received 118 Emmy Awards, more than any other television series.

== Ratings ==
When Sesame Street premiered in 1969, it aired on only 67.6% of American televisions, but it earned a 3.3 Nielsen rating, or 1.9 million households. The Children's Television Workshop (CTW), the organization that oversaw the production of Sesame Street, insisted that its seemingly low ratings were misleading. They found that although a small percentage of all viewers watched Sesame Street, approximately a quarter of all preschoolers watched it regularly. Ninety percent of households who viewed the show had children under the age of six.

In the winter of 1970, partly as a response to criticism that they were not reaching their intended audience, the CTW conducted a poll of four urban neighborhoods in New York, Chicago, and Washington, D.C. The results of the poll were positive in three out of the four neighborhoods and confirmed the show's high viewership. Sesame Street's high ratings increased during its second season, and Nielsen reported high audience loyalty. Gerald S. Lesser, CTW's first advisory board chair, reported rumors about the show becoming a fad among college students. Its ratings steadily increased for the first five seasons, and Nielsen reported that Sesame Street had the highest ratings of any PBS program. In 1985, the Workshop estimated that 20% of its regular viewers consisted of "adult-only households".

By the show's tenth anniversary in 1979, 9 million American children under the age of six were watching Sesame Street daily. Four out of five children had watched it over a six-week period, and 90% of children from low-income inner-city homes regularly viewed the show. According to a 1993 survey conducted by the US Department of Education, out of the show's 6.6 million viewers, 2.4 million kindergartners regularly watched it. 77% of preschoolers watched it once a week, and 86% of kindergartners, first-, and second-grade students had watched it once a week before starting school. The show reached most young children in almost all demographic groups, most significantly economically disadvantaged children; 88% of children from low-income families and 90% of both African-American and Latino children watched the show before entering kindergarten. Over 80% of children from all minority language groups watched it before starting school. Children from the poorest communities were most likely to be regular viewers, as were younger children. Children whose parents did not read to them regularly were less likely to be regular viewers, and children of highly educated parents stopped viewing earlier than children from disadvantaged households.

The show's ratings significantly decreased in the early 1990s, when children' viewing habits and the television marketplace had changed. In 1969, the choices in children's programming were limited, but the growth of the home-video industry during the 1980s and the boom in children's programming during the '90s on cable channels, like those on Nickelodeon's Nick Jr. programming block, which were directly influenced by Sesame Street, resulted in lower ratings for Sesame Street. In 2002, The New York Times reported that "learning to click the remote control has become a developmental milestone, like crawling and walking". The producers responded to these societal changes by making large-scale structural changes to the show.

By 2006, Sesame Street had become "the most widely viewed children's television show in the world", with 20 international independent versions and broadcasts in over 120 countries. A 1996 survey found that 95% of all American preschoolers had watched the show by the time they were three years old. In 2006, it was estimated that 75 million Americans had watched the series as children. By the show's 40th anniversary in 2009, it was ranked the fifteenth most popular children's show on television, and by its 50th anniversary in 2019, the show had 100% brand awareness globally. In 2018, the show was the second-highest-rated program on PBS Kids.

== Effect ==
According to Davis, Sesame Street is "perhaps the most vigorously researched, vetted, and fretted-over program". By 2001, there were over 1,000 research studies regarding its efficacy, impact, and effect on American culture. The CTW solicited the Educational Testing Service (ETS) to conduct its summative research. ETS' two "landmark" summative evaluations, conducted in 1970 and 1971, demonstrated that Sesame Street had a significant educational impact on its viewers. These studies provided the majority of the early educational effects of Sesame Street and have been cited in other studies of the effects of television on young children. (Note: According to Palmer and his colleague Shalom M. Fisch, these studies were responsible for securing funding for the show over the next several years.) Additional studies conducted throughout Sesame Street's history demonstrated that the show continued to have a positive effect on its young viewers. (Note: For a discussion of these studies, see: Gikow, pp. 284-285; "G" is For Growing: Thirty Years of Research on Children and Sesame Street, pp. 147—230.)

Lesser believed that Sesame Street research "may have conferred a new respectability upon the studies of the effects of visual media upon children". He also believed that the show had the same effect on the prestige in the television industry of producing shows for children. Historian Robert Morrow, in his book Sesame Street and the Reform of Children's Television, which chronicled the show's influence on children's television and on the television industry as a whole, reported that many critics of commercial television saw Sesame Street as a "straightforward illustration for reform". Les Brown, a writer for Variety, saw in Sesame Street "a hope for a more substantial future" for television.

The networks responded by creating more high-quality television programs, but that many saw them as "appeasement gestures". In spite of the CTW's effectiveness in creating a popular show, commercial television "made only a limited effort to emulate CTW's methods", and did not use a curriculum or evaluate what children learned from them. Morrow reported that by the mid-1970s, commercial television abandoned their experiments with creating better children's programming. Other critics hoped that Sesame Street, with its depiction of a functioning, multicultural community, would nurture racial tolerance in its young viewers.

As critic Richard Roeper has stated, perhaps one of the strongest indicators of the influence of Sesame Street have been the enduring rumors and urban legends surrounding the show and its characters, especially about Bert and Ernie.

== Critical reception ==
Sesame Street was praised from its debut in 1969. Newsday reported that several newspapers and magazines had written "glowing" reports about CTW and co-creator Joan Ganz Cooney. Although the series had been on the air for less than a year, Time Magazine featured Big Bird, who had received more fan mail than any of the show's human hosts, on its cover and declared, " ...It is not only the best children's show in TV history, it is one of the best parents' shows as well". The press overwhelmingly praised the new show; several popular magazines and niche magazines lauded it. A 2010 survey found that most parents supported their children's viewing of Sesame Street and other PBS educational shows, and many educators used them as aides in the classroom.

"Sesame Street is...with lapses, the most intelligent and important program in television. That is not anything much yet".

-Renata Adler, The New Yorker, 1972

David Frost declared Sesame Street "a hit everywhere it goes". Timothy Green wrote that the program was "an oasis of originality, vitality and colour amid the desert of American television". An executive at ABC, while recognizing that Sesame Street was not perfect, stated that the show "opened children's TV to taste and wit and substance"... and "made the climate right for improvement". By the end of the show's first season, ratings were high, the song "Rubber Duckie" was on the music charts for nine weeks, and Big Bird appeared on The Flip Wilson Show. Also in 1970, Sesame Street won twenty awards, including a Peabody Award, three Emmys, an award from the Public Relations Society of America, a Clio, and the Prix Jeunesse award. President Richard Nixon sent Cooney a congratulatory letter. Dr. Benjamin Spock predicted that the program would result in "better trained citizens, fewer unemployables in the next generation, fewer people on welfare, and smaller jail populations". By 1995, the show had won two Peabody Awards and four Parents' Choice Awards. It was the subject of a traveling exhibition by the Smithsonian Institution, and a film exhibition at the Museum of Modern Art. In 2002, TV Guide ranked the show number 27 on its list of the best television shows of all time; in 2013, TV Guide ranked the show number 30 on its list of the 60 best TV series. Sesame Workshop won a Peabody Award in 2009 for its website, sesamestreet.org, and the show was given Peabody's Institutional Award in 2019 for 50 years of educating and entertaining children globally. As of 2018, Sesame Street has won 189 Emmys.

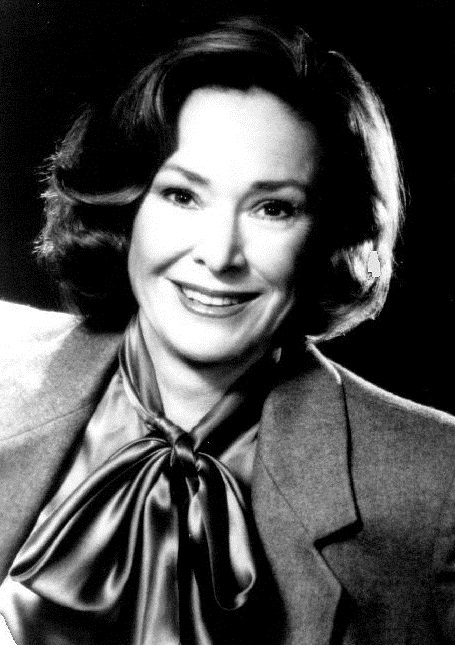
Joan Ganz Cooney, co-creator of Sesame Street and co-founder of the Sesame Workshop, in 1985

Sesame Street was not without its detractors, however. In May 1970, a state commission in Mississippi voted to exclude to host the show on its state educational TV network owing to concerns over the show's inclusive racial message. A member of the commission told The New York Times, that "Mississippi was not yet ready" for the show's integrated cast. Cooney called the commission's decision "a tragedy for both the white and black children of Mississippi". The Mississippi commission later reversed its decision 22 days later, after the vote had made national news.

According to Children and Television, Lesser's account of the development and early years of Sesame Street, there was little criticism of the show in the months following its premiere, but it increased at the end of its first season and beginning of the second season. Lesser put the early criticism into four categories: educational goals, how the goals were chosen and obtained, the show's possible unintended effects, and its portrayal of minorities and women. (Note: See Lesser, pp. 175—201 for his response to the early critics of Sesame Street.) Historian Robert W. Morrow suggested that much of the early criticism, which he called "surprisingly intense", stemmed from cultural and historical reasons in regards to, as he put it, "the place of children in American society and the controversies about television's effects on them".

The "most important" studies that found negative effects of Sesame Street were conducted by educator Herbert A. Sprigle and psychologist Thomas D. Cook during its first two seasons. Both studies found that the show increased the educational gap between poor and middle-class children. Morrow reported that these studies had little impact on the public discussion about Sesame Street. Social scientist and Head Start founder Urie Bronfenbrenner criticized the show for being too wholesome, stating, "The old, the ugly or the unwanted is simply made to disappear through a manhole". He also criticized the show for presenting bland and unrealistic characters, and for failing to teach children about social relationships and how to become a part of the society around them. Psychologist Leon Eisenberg saw Sesame Street's urban setting as "superficial" and having little to do with the problems confronted by the inner-city child.

Head Start director Edward Zigler was probably Sesame Street's most vocal critic in the show's early years. He withdrew Head Start's funding of the show, becoming the first of CTW's original investors to do so. Morrow suggested that the basis of Zigler's criticism was concern that the federal government would transfer their funding of Head Start to CTW. Also according to Morrow, these studies were utilized by critics in Sesame Street's later years, especially by child development psychologists Jerome and Dorothy G. Singer, who insisted the television shortened children's attention spans, and by author Neil Postman in his book Amusing Ourselves to Death, who believed that television could not teach children. Postman claimed that Sesame Street also introduced children to a shallow pop culture, undermined American education, and relieved parents of their responsibility of teaching their children how to read.

Since federal funds had been used to produce the show, more segments of the population insisted upon being represented on Sesame Street. Morrow credited CTW's commitment to multiculturalism as one source for their conflicts with the leadership of minority groups, especially Latino groups and feminists. These conflicts were resolved when the CTW added or substituted offending segments and characters. By 1977, the cast consisted of two African American women, one of whom was single, two African American men, a Chicano man, two white men, an American Indian woman, a Puerto Rican woman, and a Deaf white woman.

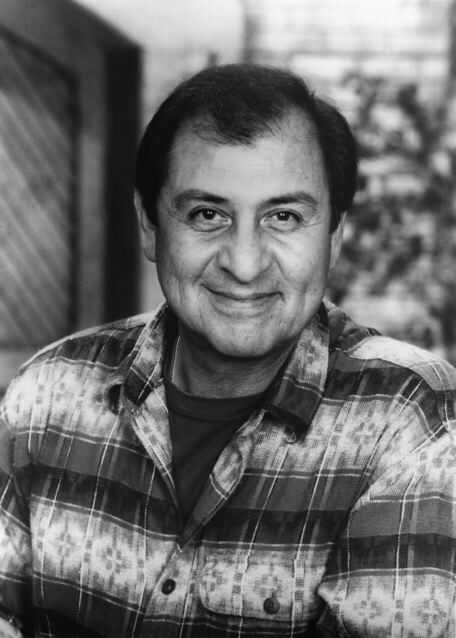
Emilio Delgado (Luis), who joined the cast of Sesame Street in 1971

Latino groups criticized the show for the lack of Hispanic characters during its early years. A committee of Hispanic activists, commissioned by the CTW in 1970, called Sesame Street "racist" and said that the show's bilingual aspects were of "poor quality and patronizing". According to Morrow, Cooney admitted that the show's bilingual elements were "not well thought out". By 1971, the CTW hired Hispanic actors, production staff, and researchers, and by the mid-70s, Morrow reported that "the show included Chicano and Puerto Rican cast members, films about Mexican holidays and foods, and cartoons that taught Spanish words". In 1989, Sesame Street created a four-year "race relations curriculum" that focused on introducing its viewers to various cultural backgrounds.

The New York Times reported that creating strong female characters "that make kids laugh, but not...as female stereotypes" has been a challenge for the producers of Sesame Street. Davis reported that the National Organization for Women (NOW) expressed concerns that the show needed to be "less male-oriented". Members of NOW were "rankled by the portrayal of Susan, whom they saw as a subservient, powerless dispenser of milk and cookies". In the spring of 1970, Boston Globe columnist Ellen Goodman objected to what she considered Sesame Street's portrayal of women and girls as passive. In late 1970, the NOW threatened to boycott the show. The show's producers satisfied these critics by making Susan a nurse and by hiring a female writer.

According to Morrow, change regarding how women and girls were depicted on Sesame Street occurred slowly. CTW's research staff, which were mostly made up of women, worked with the mostly male production staff to raise their consciousnesses about how women and girls were portrayed in their scripts. Another source of friction between the CTW and feminists were the lack of female Muppets, for which they held Jim Henson responsible, as well as his organization of all-male puppeteers, who tended to create male characters. The demanding production schedule tended to attract only men, and Henson expressed his opinion that women were incapable of withstanding it. Gikow believed that the difficulty creating breakout Muppet characters was due to children's viewing styles: girls have tended to become attached to male characters they like, but boys did not tend to form the same attachments to female characters. The show's inventory of material, some of which many feminists found sexist and which were shown over and over, were slowly replaced by new, less sexist segments. As more female Muppets performers like Fran Brill, (Note: Brill developed a solution to the height difference between her and the taller male puppeteers: wearing boots with 4–5 inches of platform glued to the soles.) Stephanie D'Abruzzo, and Leslie Carrara-Rudolph were hired and trained, stronger female characters like Abby Cadabby were created. As an interesting contrast, Sesame Street was also chastised by a Louisiana critic for the presence of strong single women on the show.

In 2003, one of Sesame Street's international co-productions, Takalani Sesame, caused some controversy in the US when the first HIV-positive Muppet, Kami, was created in response to South Africa's AIDS epidemic. It marked the first time AIDS and the goal of confronting the disease's stigma was included in a preschool curriculum. According to the documentary, The World According to Sesame Street, the reaction of many in the U.S. surprised Sesame Workshop. Some members of Congress attacked Sesame Street, Sesame Workshop, and PBS. According to co-producer Naila Farouky, "The reaction we got in the US blew me away. I didn't expect people to be so horrible... and hateful and mean". The controversy in the U.S. was short-lived, and died down when the public discovered the facts about the South African co-production, and when United Nations Secretary-General Kofi Annan and prominent minister and conservative political commentator Jerry Falwell praised the Workshop's efforts. Kami went on to be named UNICEF's Champion for Children in November 2003.
