= Sesame Street Live =

Touring theatre show

- Company: Round Room Live (2024–present); Feld Entertainment (July 2017–2023); VStar Entertainment Group (2015–July 2017); VEE Corporation (1980–2015); Sesame Workshop (licensing rights)
- Genre: Kids
- Show type: Arena
- Date of premiere: 17 September 1980
- Location: Touring

Creative team
- Creator: Vincent Egan

Other information
- Host: Big Bird (up to Make Your Magic); Elmo (2001-present); Murray Monster (Can't Stop Singing only)
- Official website

Sesame Street Live is a live touring show based on the children's television show Sesame Street produced by Round Room Live under license of Sesame Workshop.

== History ==
The VEE Corporation was started in March 1980 by founder Vincent Egan, who had an idea to produce a live-character show based on Sesame Street. He had worked for the Ice Follies tour, which had a segment featuring Muppets. Egan approached Jim Henson's company and Children's Television Workshop, who were interested. With outside funding, Vee was able to sign a licensing agreement with the Children's Television Workshop for the characters.

The first Sesame Street Live show opened in September 1980 at the Metropolitan Sports Center in Bloomington, Minnesota for a successful five-day run. The following shows in five locations had lackluster attendance costing VEE the profits made in Bloomington. Egan figured that the marketing material was confusing people in those markets as what type of show was not specified. He overhauled the script and marketing while getting his creditors to wait for payments. That Christmas, the show went on to play for four weeks at Madison Square Garden's 4,000-seat Felt Forum in New York City before an audience of 100,000 people.

VEE quickly ramped up to two different shows for the 1981–1982 season, then added a third Australia show in 1982–1983. From the 1983–1984 season until the 1988–1989 season there were only two Sesame Street Live shows on tour.

On April 1, 2015, Blue Star Media, LLC purchased VEE Corporation with Egan continuing on as a consultant; later that year the combined company was renamed VStar Entertainment Group.

In November 2016, Sesame Workshop announced an agreement with Feld Entertainment to take over producing Sesame Street Live. VStar continues to produce other Sesame Street shows at various locations, and provides costumes.

== Productions ==
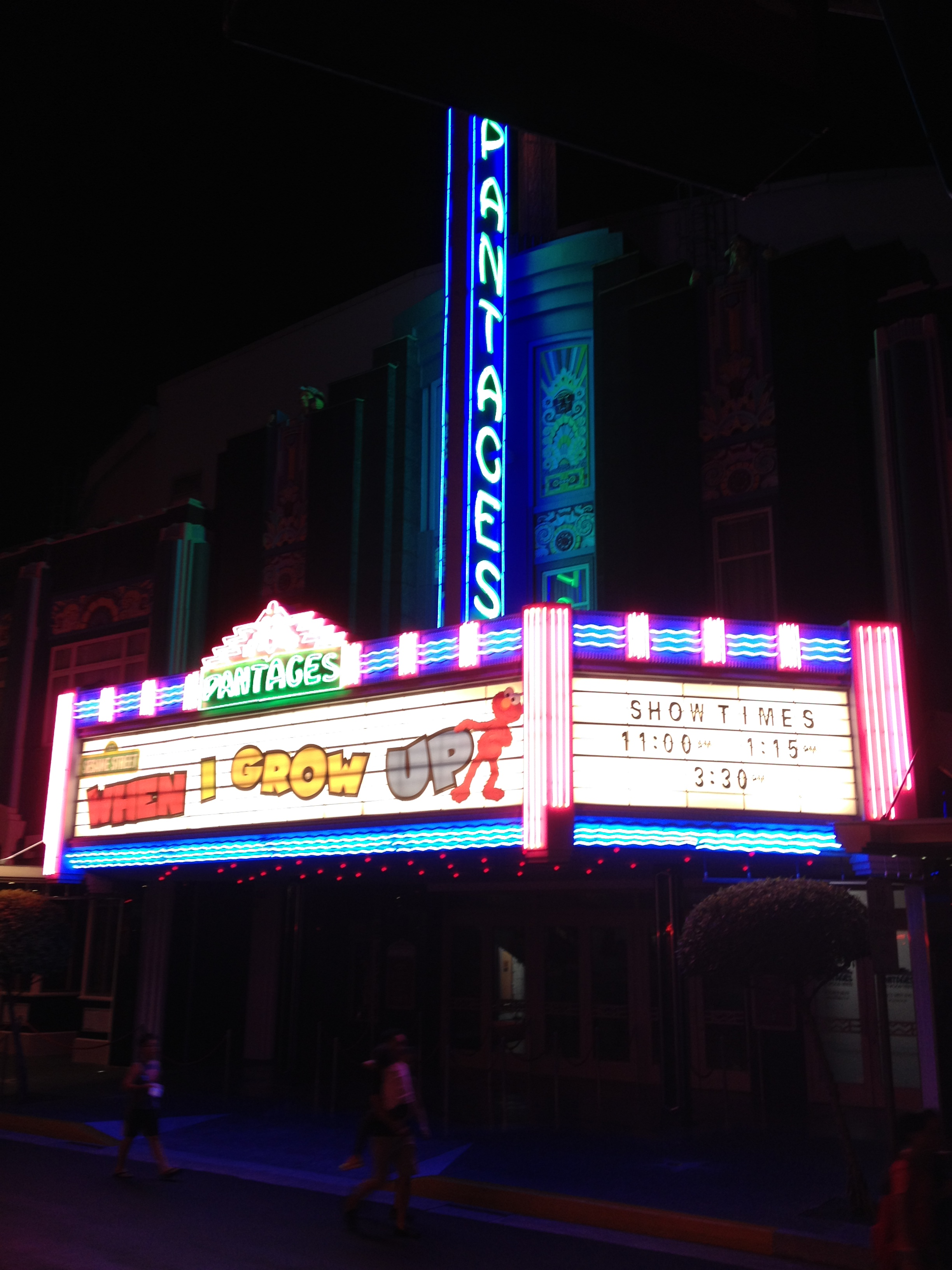
When I Grow Up was performed daily at the Pantages Hollywood Theater located on Hollywood Boulevard, Universal Studios Singapore

In order to keep the show running annually in the same cities, new plot lines are created and rotated through the tour. Because the target audience changes as children grow up, shows are often removed from the rotation for a few years, then return with some modifications.

In order of their creation, the Sesame Street Live shows have been:

VEE Corporation (1980–2015)

- Missing Bird Mystery (1980–1982, Australia 1982–1983, 1984–1986; Australia, Singapore, Hong Kong 1990–1991)
- Super Spectacular Totally Amateur Show (1981–1983)
- Sesame Jamboree (1982–1984)
- Around the World (1983–1985)
- Save Our Street (1985–1987)
- Big Bird Goes to Hollywood (1986–87, 1988–1989)
- Big Bird and the ABCs (1987–1992)
- Big Bird's Sesame Street Story (1988)
- Sesame Street Live (1988–1989)
- Silly Dancing (1989–1991, Britain 1992–1993)
- Sleeping Birdie (1990–1992)
- Let's Play School (1991–1992, 1995–1996)
- Where's the Birdie? (1992–1993, 1994–1995, Germany 1993–1994)
- Let's Be Friends (1994–1995)
- 1-2-3...Imagine! (1996–1997)
- Imagine... Ernie is King (1996–1997)
- Big Bird's Sunny Day Camp Out (2000)
- Out of this World (2003–2005)
- Elmo's Coloring Book (2005)
- Super Grover Ready for Action (2005–2006)
- Elmo's Green Thumb (2008–2009)
- 1-2-3 Imagine! with Elmo & Friends (2009)
- Can’t Stop Singing (2013)

VStar Entertainment Group (2015–July 2017)

- Elmo Makes Music (2016)
- Let's Dance! (2014–2016)
- Make a New Friend! (2014–2017)

Feld Entertainment (July 2017 – February 2023)

- Let’s Party! (October 2017–2023)
- Make Your Magic (October 2018–February 2023)
- C is for Celebration

As of spring 2024, the producing organization of Sesame Street Live is Round Room Live.

Round Room Live

- Say Hello (Spring 2024)
- Elmo's Got the Moves (Spring 2026)

== See also ==
- Influence of Sesame Street
- Sesame Workshop Annual Benefit Gala - A Musical Show with Sesame Street Muppets in New York City (2003-2019, 2021, 2022-present)
