= Vincent Egan =

Vincent E. Egan
- Born: 1942
- Died: December 1, 2016 (aged 73-74)
- Occupations: Businessman; entertainment company founder
- Title: Founder of the Event and Arena Marketing Conference and VEE Corporation

Vincent E. Egan was an executive and entertainment company founder. Egan founded VEE Corporation for the Sesame Street Live touring shows. He was a founder of the Event and Arena Marketing Conference. By 2009, Vincent had been married and divorced twice.

== Life ==
Vincent E. Egan was raised in north Minneapolis. As a young adult, he worked for GM as a district sales manager primarily in Montana. In 1970, he returned to Minnesota and bought a Dayton farm on 2.5 acres. He kept the farm despite taking a job in Chicago in 1970. The job he took was as a marketer with the Ice Follies, which had a show segment with the Sesame Street Muppets. He was elevated through the ranks until he was vice president of marketing and operations. However, in 1978, he was fired after a disagreement with his boss thus returned to his Dayton farm. He looked for a job as a shoe salesman to no avail.

After months of unemployment, in the late 1979 and 1980, Egan focused on the idea of family entertainment. As at the time, there were only three touring family shows, Ringling Bros. and Barnum & Bailey Circus and two ice shows, Ice Follies and Holiday on Ice. He based it off his time working for the Ice Follies which had a segment with those Sesame Street Muppets. Egan approached Jim Henson's company and Children's Television Workshop, who were interested. Egan refinanced his home mortgage for $25 thousand in additional funding and found an equity investor. With the funding for his corporation that he started on March 14, 1980, VEE Corporation was able to sign a licensing agreement with the Children's Television Workshop for the characters.

The first Sesame Street Live show opened in September 1980 at the Metropolitan Sports Center in Bloomington, Minnesota for a five-day run. That show was successful. The following shows in five locations had lackluster attendance costing VEE the profits made in Bloomington. Egan figured that the marketing material was confusing people in those markets as what type of show was not specified. He overhauled the script and marketing while getting his creditors to wait for payments. That Christmas, the show went on to play for four weeks at Madison Square Garden's 4,000-seat Felt Forum in New York City before an audience of 100,000 people. Egan was able to expand to Henson's Muppets tours in the mid-1980s and other show.

Around 2000, Egan purchased the equity fund's stake in the corporation. On April 1, 2015, Blue Star Media, LLC purchased VEE Corporation with Egan continuing on as a consultant. On December 1, 2016, Vincent E. Egan died.

== Awards ==
- Hall of Fame Award (2015) Event and Arena Marketing Conference
