= Adapted live stage tours =

Theatrical productions based on TV or film media

Adapted live stage tours are theatrical productions based on screen-originated intellectual properties—typically television or film franchises—licensed for live performance in arenas and theatres. The format expanded in the 1980s with shows such as Sesame Street Live (debut 1980), which helped popularize arena-scale family entertainment built around TV characters. Later examples include live adaptations of Blue's Clues, Mighty Morphin Power Rangers, and Pokémon.

== Notable examples ==
Sesame Street Live (1980–present day): Long-running arena show launched by VEE Corporation (later VStar), playing major venues including Madison Square Garden.

Mighty Morphin Power Rangers World Tour Live on Stage (1994–1996): A costumed stage spectacle tied to the TV series, presented in large venues such as the Universal Amphitheatre.

Blue's Clues Live! (1999–2003): National tour that played Radio City Music Hall and other theatres, reviewed in major press as a preschool-aimed, interactive stage show.

Pokémon Live! (2000–2001): A musical adaptation that premiered at Radio City Music Hall and toured across the U.S. and Canada.

Other notable examples include:

- Bear in the Big Blue House Live, VStar Entertainment Group
- Big Comfy Couch Live
- Caillou Live
- Care Bears Live, VStar Entertainment Group
- Clifford, the Big Red Dog
- Dinosaurs Live!,
- Dragon Tales Live, VStar Entertainment Group
- Jim Henson's Muppet Babies Live!, VStar Entertainment Group
- Max & Ruby Live
- Rugrats: A Live Adventure
- Sesamstrasse
- Zoobilee Zoo Live!

Not included on this list are stationary productions like Playhouse Disney: Live on Stage
