= Street Gang: How We Got to Sesame Street =

2021 American documentary film

- Theatrical release poster
- Directed by: Marilyn Agrelo
- Based on: Street Gang by Michael Davis
- Produced by: Trevor Crafts; Lisa Diamond; Ellen Scherer Crafts
- Cinematography: Luke Geissbühler
- Edited by: Ben Gold
- Music by: T. Griffin
- Production companies: HBO Documentary Films; Macrocosm Entertainment
- Distributed by: Screen Media Films
- Release dates: January 30, 2021 (Sundance); April 23, 2021 (United States)
- Running time: 107 minutes
- Country: United States
- Language: English

Street Gang: How We Got to Sesame Street is a 2021 American documentary film directed by Marilyn Agrelo. Based on the non-fiction book Street Gang by Michael Davis, the film chronicles the development and airing of the children's television program Sesame Street, featuring interviews with series creators Joan Ganz Cooney and Lloyd Morrisett, as well as writers, actors, and artists involved in its creation.

An HBO Original Documentary, Street Gang had its world premiere at the 2021 Sundance Film Festival. It received a theatrical release in the United States on April 23, 2021, and was released on video-on-demand services on May 7, 2021.

== Summary ==
Inspired by the book Street Gang by Michael Davis, the film chronicles the early history of the children's television program Sesame Street and the artists, writers, producers, and educators who created it. The documentary focuses on the show's origins, its goal of teaching young children concepts like the alphabet and numbers, and controversy it faced due to its racially integrated cast. It covers the first 20 years of the show's history, from its development and 1969 broadcast debut to the death of puppeteer Jim Henson in 1990, whose Muppet characters feature prominently on the program.

== Release ==
In November 2018, Focus Features acquired distribution rights to the film, with HBO Documentary Films producing and acquiring streaming and broadcast rights. In December 2020, Screen Media Films acquired distribution rights to the film, with Focus no longer attached to distribute, and HBO still attached. It had its world premiere at the Sundance Film Festival on January 30, 2021. It was released in a limited release on April 23, 2021, followed by video on demand on May 7, 2021.

The film premiered at the 2021 Sundance Film Festival, was released in theatres on April 23, 2021, and released on video-on-demand services on May 7, 2021. HBO released the documentary on December 13, 2021.

== Reception ==
On the review aggregator website Rotten Tomatoes, the film has an approval rating of 95%, based on 88 reviews, with an average rating of 8.10/10. The site's critics consensus reads: "Like the show whose groundbreaking creation it commemorates, Street Gang: How We Got to Sesame Street is as enlightening as it is purely entertaining." According to Metacritic, which assigned a weighted average score of 82 out of 100, based on 14 critics, the film received "universal acclaim".

Variety's Chris Willman, in his review of the film, wrote that "It's hard to ask for much more than a doc that captures creatives thoughtfully sneaking the civil revolution as well as basic education into children's TV and includes a Muppets blooper reel." Daniel Fienberg of The Hollywood Reporter also gave the film a mostly positive review, concluding: "If 107 minutes is maybe insufficient for something as important and layered as Sesame Street, that likely won't keep viewers from being satisfied. They'll just have to make a few more documentaries about this seminal show."

Josh Flanders of the Chicago Reader called the film "A nostalgic yet informative look at the most successful children's television show in history." IndieWire's Kate Erbland gave the film a grade of "B+", writing: "Street Gang may lightly gloss over some of the tougher elements of its genesis and legacy, but the staggering amount of material on offer makes the case that a good heart was always meant to be the best part of the show." Brian Tallerico of RogerEbert.com referred to the film as "remarkably likable" but lamented its "scattered, quick structure", calling it "an enjoyable documentary, but it's also shallow when one considers all of the stories told in it that barely get a few minutes of screen time".

=== Awards ===
Street Gang: How We Got to Sesame Street won the News and Documentary Emmy Award for Outstanding Arts and Culture Documentary at the 43rd News and Documentary Emmy Awards in 2022.
