= Cirque Productions =

Subsidiary of Cirque du Soleil

- Type: Private
- Industry: Entertainment
- Founded: 1993
- Founder: Neil Goldberg
- Headquarters: Pompano Beach, Florida, U.S.
- Area served: Worldwide
- Key people: Neil Goldberg, founder and artistic director
- Parent: VStar Entertainment Group
- Website: cirqueproductions.com

Cirque Productions, also known as Cirque Dreams, is a subsidiary of Cirque du Soleil.

Originally founded in 1993 by Neil Goldberg and based in Pompano Beach, Florida, Cirque Productions went on to create elaborate stage productions for two Super Bowls, the NBA, Disney, Busch Gardens, Six Flags, Miss Universe, NBC, ABC and CBS as well as for public theatre, Broadway, casinos, tours and corporate events worldwide.

In 2017, VStar Entertainment Group acquired Cirque Productions. VStar Entertainment Group was then acquired by Cirque du Soleil in 2018, bringing Cirque Dreams under the Cirque du Soleil banner, along with other IP assets such as Paw Patrol.

== Productions (abridged) ==
=== Cirque Dreams Jungle Fantasy ===
The show opened at the Broadway theatre in 2008. The show re-launched on July 27, 2010, at the MGM Grand Theatre at Foxwoods, Connecticut, for a limited engagement starring Debbie Gibson in the title role of Mother Nature. In 2013, the show was redesigned into a modern dinner theatre experience in partnership with Norwegian Cruise Line, to perform indefinitely on their new Breakaway sailing year-round from NYC.

=== Cirque Dreams Holidaze ===
The Cirque Dreams Holidaze show is a winter themed holiday production that debuted in 2007.

=== Cirque Dreams & Dinner ===
Norwegian Cruise Line offers a version of the company's shows, which according to USA today is "nothing like anything currently found at sea." The show features aerialists flying overhead, acrobats, contortionists, muscle men, jokesters and musicians all performing while the guests eat dinner. The show's artistic director claims if rough seas take place they will just become part of the show.

=== Cirque Dreams World Tour ===
In 2012, Cirque Productions teamed with Armed Forces Entertainment to bring the first Cirque Dreams World Tour to U.S. troops and their families at 17 U.S. military bases in 10 different countries around the world. As of January 23, 2012, the show has already visited Naval Base Guam and several bases in Japan, including Yokota Air Base, Yokosuka Naval Base, Misawa Air Base, and Camp Foster in Okinawa.

== Legal issues ==
Cirque du Soleil filed a trademark infringement lawsuit against them and others in the late 1990s over the use of the word cirque ('circus' in French). After a six-year battle, Cirque Dreams along with others who used the name cirque were successful in defeating the lawsuit.
