= Children and Television: Lessons from Sesame Street =

1974 book by Gerald S. Lesser

- Book cover
- Author: Gerald S. Lesser
- Language: English
- Genre: Non-fiction
- Publisher: Vintage Books
- Publication date: 1974
- Publication place: United States
- Media type: Mass-market paperback
- Pages: 291
- ISBN: 978-0-394-48100-5
- OCLC: 1289005
- Dewey Decimal: 791.457
- LC Class: PN1992.77.S43 L4

Children and Television: Lessons from Sesame Street (1974) is a non-fiction book written by Gerald S. Lesser, in which he describes the production of Sesame Street and the formation and pedagogical philosophy of the Children's Television Workshop. Lesser was a professor at Harvard University, studying how social class and ethnicity interacted with school achievement, and was one of the first academics in the U.S. to research the effects of television on children and their development. He was initially skeptical about the potential of television as a teaching tool, but he was eventually named advisory board chairman of the Children's Television Workshop (CTW), the organization created to oversee the production and research for Sesame Street, and served as the show's first educational director. Lesser wrote the book early in Sesame Street's history to evaluate the show's effectiveness, to explain what its writers, researchers, and producers were attempting to do, and to respond to criticism of Sesame Street.

Children and Television has four sections: "A Proposal", "Planning", "Broadcasting", and "Lessons from Sesame Street". The book also has a preface and an epilogue, written by Lesser, a foreword by co-creator Joan Ganz Cooney, and an introduction by co-creator Lloyd Morrisett. Scattered throughout the book are cartoons drawn by children's author Maurice Sendak. Lesser describes the origin and development of Sesame Street and his part in it. He also describes the research that went into the show's creation and production.

== Background ==
Gerald S. Lesser was the Biglow Professor of Education and Developmental Psychology at Harvard University. He studied how social class and ethnicity interacted with school achievement and was among the first academics in the U.S. to research the effects of television on children and their development. In 1963, he served as an academic adviser for the NBC educational program Exploring. In 1968, Sesame Street co-creator Lloyd Morrisett, whom he had met as a student at Yale University, asked Lesser to assist with the research of a new children's show he and producer Joan Ganz Cooney were developing, a show that eventually became Sesame Street.

Lesser was initially skeptical about the potential of television as a teaching tool, but he was eventually named advisory board chairman of the Children's Television Workshop (CTW), the organization created to oversee the production and research for Sesame Street, and was the show's first educational director. He was also skeptical about Cooney's qualifications as CTW's first director, but Cooney later stated, "...I couldn't begin to measure how proud I am to be Gerry Lesser's colleague and how happy I am to know the pleasure of his company".

In the summer of 1968, under what Sesame Street researchers Edward Palmer and Shalom Fisch called Lesser's "able leadership", five three-day curriculum planning seminars were conducted in Boston. The purpose of the seminars, attended by educational experts and the new show's writers and producers, was to ascertain which school-preparation skills to emphasize. According to writer Michael Davis, Lesser's skills at encouraging collegiality were evident during the seminars. Writer Louise Gikow reported that the real friction occurred between the educators present. As Sesame Street songwriter Christopher Cerf reported, "...[Lesser] ran meetings better than anyone I've ever seen. He made everybody feel like they were important, that they got listened to, and that their work ended up in the final product". Davis noted that the seminars also served as a "crash course in child development, psychology, and preschool education" for the show's producers and writers. According to researcher Robert W. Morrow, Lesser understood that in order to bring research about child development into the production process of Sesame Street, a close working relationship had to be created between the researchers and the producers. Davis credited Lesser's "informal, unpretentious, and collaborative" manner with fostering that close relationship.

As head of research at Sesame Street, Lesser came up with what he called "the CTW model". This model included assumptions about how children learn from television, the use of high-quality production values, and the establishment of "an organization that fostered mutual confidence among its members". Field research testing the effectiveness of each episode's content was conducted at preschools, prior to broadcast. The show's educational goals were measured after each episode aired to further evaluate the show's effectiveness.

Lesser wrote Children and Television in 1974, early in the show's history, to evaluate the effectiveness of the CTW model, to explain what the show's writers, researchers, and producers were attempting to do, and to respond to criticism of Sesame Street. Lesser also explained the show's logic, its curriculum, and its pedagogy. Morrow called Lesser's book "Sesame Street's most adept defense". According to Morrow, Children and Television was the most complete explanation of the CTW's reasoning behind the show at the time, and a memoir of the show's development.

== Synopsis ==
Children and Television has four sections: "A Proposal", "Planning", "Broadcasting," and "Lessons from Sesame Street". The book has a preface and an epilogue, written by Lesser, a foreword written by Joan Ganz Cooney, and an introduction by Lloyd Morrisett. Scattered throughout the book are cartoons drawn by children's author Maurice Sendak, who attended the 1968 seminars. According to Davis, director and producer Jon Stone reported that Sendak's cartoons, which Stone later called "X-rated" and dealt with "basic themes of sex and violence", were created to vent Sendak's frustration with the seminars, which he found boring and long-winded.

Lesser begins his book by describing the origin of Sesame Street and his part in it. He had been studying child development and how its concepts could be used to teach children; since 1961, he had studied children's reactions to television and whether the medium could be used to teach them. In 1966, he was approached by Cooney and Morrisett to assist them in developing the new show's educational objectives and research goals, and he agreed despite his misgivings about television's effectiveness as a teaching tool.

Sesame Street's audience included any child in the country who wished to watch it, but Lesser reports that the producers' original purpose was to focus on the poor children of America. Lesser states, "If the series did not work for poor children, the entire project would fail". He is critical of the American public school system and blames its failure to educate children on the lack of defined goals. When he wrote Television and Children, most American children received no preschool education. The first two chapters of the book detail the reasons for the experiment of creating an educational television program like Sesame Street, especially regarding its audience.

"Grownups never seem to understand anything by themselves, and it is tiresome for children to be always and forever explaining things to them".

— Antoine de Saint-Exupéry, The Little Prince
Gerald Lesser used this quote to begin the second section of Children and Television. He introduced many of his sections and chapters with pertinent quotes.

Lesser opens the section on "Planning" by relating how many of the cast and crew were recruited: executive producer David Connell, producer Sam Gibbon, head writer Jon Stone, producer and writer Matt Robinson, Jim Henson, composer Joe Raposo, and actors Loretta Long, Bob McGrath, and Will Lee. Lesser also recounts the process of hiring head researcher Edward L. Palmer and those involved in community outreach. The producers of the new show spent eighteen months planning, something that was unprecedented in children's television. Lesser extensively describes the series of curriculum seminars that took place at Harvard University and in New York City in the summer of 1968.

These chapters outline the philosophy behind Sesame Street. The show's creators made assumptions about teaching and held the unconventional view that learning can be unintentional and enjoyable. Finally, they decided that although Sesame Street was set in an urban setting, they would avoid depicting more negativity than what was already present in the child's environment. Lesser states, "With all its raucousness and slapstick humor, Sesame Street became a sweet show, and its staff maintains that there is nothing wrong in that".

The researchers developed a "Writer's Notebook" for the show's writers and producers to serve as a bridge between curriculum goals and script development. Lesser connects the show's production techniques—including music, humor (especially slapstick comedy), and animation—to its educational goals. Lesser emphasizes the importance of characters, both human and Muppet, to sustain children's attention. According to Lesser, Sesame Street combines four elements to sustain attention: Muppets, the cast of live adults and children on the set, animation, and live-action film.

According to Lesser, before the creation of Sesame Street, children's reactions to educational television were ignored; this marked the first time that they were studied to evaluate and improve the show's content and efficacy. Lesser reports that approximately 10-15 percent of the CTW's initial two-year $8 million budget was spent on research. He relates the priorities for pre-production research, which he called "summative evaluation". Using external research groups such as the Educational Testing Service (ETS), the Workshop wanted to determine whether watching the show made any difference. They were particularly interested in comparing the show's effect on children from different socio-economic groups and whether viewing conditions affected its effectiveness.

Lesser states, "This became the first time in television's 25-year history that child-watching was systematically applied over a sustained period to the design of a televised series for children". Lesser describes the new methods researcher Edward Palmer created to study the effects Sesame Street had on its young viewers; for example, the "distractor", in which a slide projector was placed next to a television set and adjusted to change slides every eight seconds. The researchers recorded when children in their study shifted their attention from the television to the projector, and the collected data were analyzed. Segments were removed based on the information gathered. "This was the first time in television's history that the children themselves would be listened to with care as a television series for them was designed and broadcast", Lesser states.

Lesser begins the section on "Broadcasting" relating the origin of the show's name. As he puts it, "...We were forced to select the name we all liked the least". Lesser reports that the show's premiere on November 10, 1969 was met with a large amount of acclaim and good reviews, but there were some negative reviews and criticism, which he recounts and addresses in great detail in the chapter entitled "Criticism". He includes the criticism of approximately thirty groups and individuals, and demonstrates the essence and range of their arguments.

Lesser describes the research on the long-term effects of Sesame Street. He reports that the show was watched by three to four million viewers by the middle of its first season, and breaks down the viewership into categories. According to Lesser, ratings remained consistently high. Lesser also describes the testing used by ETS, which found positive differences after the first three weeks of the show's first season. They found that the children who watched the most learned the most.

The final section of Lesser's book, "Lessons from Sesame Street", summarizes what the creators and researchers were attempting to do. As Lesser states, "Here is Sesame Street's main lesson: It deliberately uses television to teach without hiding its educational intentions and yet it attracts a large and devoted audience of young children from all parts of the country".

== Reviews ==
Terry Barrett of Ohio State University calls Children and Television a "serious book", something that could be read by the general public without compromising the field of education. Barrett also calls the book an informative treatment of an "interesting contemporary educational phenomenon". Joan Tierney of the Canadian Broadcasting Corporation calls the book "a well-thought, well-organized historical version" of the early history and development of Sesame Street. She considers the book not only a "how-to" on creating and producing a children's television show, but also an important exposure for the public of the hard work and dedication it required to put it on the air. For Tierney, the most interesting part of the story Lesser tells in the book is how people with strong, different opinions and temperaments learned to work together and give television "a little bit of class". She applauds Lesser for including the CTW's detractors, but believes he unnecessarily included the more ridiculous criticisms to give Sesame Street and the Workshop more credibility. Rose K. Goldsen of Cornell University criticizes Lesser for legitimizing "the strange folk belief that depositing lore in a child's head is the same as educating a child". She criticizes the research that Lesser describes in the book and insists that it should be considered product testing rather than educational research. She also criticizes Lesser for legitimizing consumerism.

Ellen Wartella of Northwestern University called Children and Television a "profound book" that greatly influenced the field of children and media. She said that it was the first book in the U.S. that established the idea that children and television could be studied from a developmental perspective, that academics could be involved in the production of educational television programs, and that "children's development and our understanding of children's development could be important in the creation of media products". The book also had a profound effect how later research has been conducted, and has been cited in hundreds of studies and books.

== Works cited ==
- Davis, Michael (2008). Street Gang: The Complete History of Sesame Street. New York: Viking Press. ISBN 978-0-670-01996-0.
- Lesser, Gerald S. (1974). Children and Television: Lessons From Sesame Street. New York: Vintage Books. ISBN 0-394-71448-2.
- Morrow, Robert W. (2006). Sesame Street and the Reform of Children's Television. Baltimore, Maryland: Johns Hopkins University Press. ISBN 0-8018-8230-3.
- Palmer, Edward L.; Fisch, Shalom M. (2001). "The Beginnings of Sesame Street Research". In Fisch, Shalom M.; Truglio, Rosemarie T. (eds.). "G" is for Growing: Thirty Years of Research on Children and Sesame Street. Mahwah, New Jersey: Lawrence Erlbaum Publishers. pp. 5–24. ISBN 0-8058-3395-1.
