= Neil Goldberg (producer) =

American businessman

Neil Goldberg is an American theater producer and founder of Cirque Dreams and Cirque Productions. In a career spanning more than 4 decades, he has designed and produced productions for two Super Bowls, the NBA, Disney, Busch Gardens, Six Flags, Miss Universe, NBC, ABC, CBS; Norwegian, Royal Caribbean & Carnival Cruise Lines and Armed Forces Entertainment.

== Biography ==
Goldberg was raised in an Orthodox Jewish home on Long Island, where he developed an interest in the theatrical arts at an early age. After attending C.W. Post College (LIU Post), he worked as a textile designer in the New York garment district at United Merchants and Manufacturers. The company transferred him to Florida; he soon left his job and launched Cirque Dreams.

Early on his productions included Cirque Ingenieux for theatre and PBS and a variety of live entertainment shows for MGM, Harrah's, Caesars, Ballys, Mohegan Sun, Trump, Foxwoods, Hilton Hotels and casinos worldwide. He has directed shows with the Pittsburgh, Baltimore, New World and National symphonies and featured shows with Parkinson's Foundation, American Red Cross, American Heart Association, The American Cancer Society and the youngARTS program of the National Foundation for Advancement in the Arts.

He founded the Cirque Dreams franchise in 1993, which includes: Cirque Dreams Holidaze and Cirque Dreams Jungle Fantasy amongst others. Cirque Dreams Jungle Fantasy was the first show of its kind to perform on Broadway at The Broadway Theatre and was nominated for an American Theatre Wing Best Costume Design Award. The NY Daily News declared "There have only been a handful of shows that have generated an exclamation point as assertive as the ones created and directed by Neil Goldberg." His shows have appeared in over 500 US cities and abroad with highlight engagements at the Kennedy Center; the Grand Ole Opry House; Ziegfeld Theatre, NYC; Dolby Theatre, LA; Alte Oper house, Frankfurt, Germany; Salle des Etoiles, Monaco; and the Ministry of Bahrain Summer Festival. In 2018, Cirque Dreams was acquired by Cirque du Soleil.

In 2021, Neil conceived and wrote Pomp, Snow & Cirqueumstance™, an illustrated children's holiday book with foreword by Chris Jones, noted Broadway, Theatre and Culture Critic from the Chicago Tribune and New York Daily News. The book launched in collaboration with Joe DiMaggio Children's Hospital and is published by Brown Books Publishing Group.

Goldberg's other companies, Variety Arts Management & Dreams Studios, continue to focus on developing creative experiences, multimedia, film and costuming. He is the founding philanthropist of the Neil Goldberg Dream Foundation, established to enrich the arts.
