= VStar Entertainment Group =

American family entertainment production company

- Type: Private
- Industry: Entertainment
- Predecessors: Vee Corporation; Blue Star Media, LLC
- Founded: March 14, 1980; 46 years ago
- Headquarters: Minneapolis, Minnesota, US
- Number of locations: 2
- Key people: Eric Grilly (CEO); Neil Goldberg; (Cirque Dreams president)
- Parent: AUA Private Equity
- Divisions: VStar Production Services; VStar Costumes & Creatures
- Subsidiaries: Cirque Dreams
- Website: Official website

VStar Entertainment Group is a family entertainment production company headquartered in Minneapolis, Minnesota, United States. It produced Sesame Street Live, a live touring stage show based on the television series. It has also produced stage shows based on The Muppet Show and Muppet Babies, Paw Patrol, Barney & Friends, Trolls, Bear in the Big Blue House, Dragon Tales, Baby Shark's Big Show!, and Curious George.

== History ==
=== Vee Corporation ===
Vee Corporation was started on March 14, 1980 from an idea by founder Vincent Egan to produce a live character show just for Sesame Street. At the time, there were only three touring family shows, Ringling Bros. and Barnum & Bailey Circus and two ice shows, Ice Follies and Holiday on Ice. He based it off his time working for the Ice Follies which had a segment with the Sesame Street Muppets. Egan approached Jim Henson's company and Children's Television Workshop, who were interested. He then found an investor in Gordon Stofer, whose Norwest Growth Fund took half ownership in the company for $500,000. Egan refinanced his home mortgage for $25,000 in additional funding. With the funding, Vee was able to sign a licensing agreement with the Children's Television Workshop for the characters.

The first Sesame Street Live show opened in September 1980 at the Metropolitan Sports Center in Bloomington, Minnesota for a five-day run. That show was successful. The following shows in five locations had lackluster attendance costing VEE the profits made in Bloomington. Egan figured that the marketing material was confusing people in those markets as what type of show was not specified. He overhauled the script and marketing while getting his creditors to wait for payments. That Christmas, the show went on to play for four weeks at Madison Square Garden's 4,000-seat Felt Forum in New York City before an audience of 100,000 people.

Around 2000, Egan purchased Norwest Fund's stake in the corporation. He also formed two divisions, Vee Costumes & Creatures and Vee Production Services, to successfully diversify the company.

=== Blue Star ===
Sanjay Syal started Blue Star Productions before 1995 to produce trade shows, producing over 100 events per year. Syal then formed Blue Star Media in 2011 to produce a traveling exhibition, Discover the Dinosaurs, which became one of the most successful traveling family events in the country, with over 120 events per year. With the success of the exhibition, Syal then proceeded to wind down Blue Star Productions as contracts expired. Blue Star Media then started to look for a partner finding AUA Private Equity, who purchase a share of the company from Syal in early June 2014 via a leverage buyout. A tented version of the Discover exhibition was launched in 2014 at two state fairs, New York State Fair, and the California State Fair, and had 14% of total yearly attendance for the exhibition.

=== VStar Entertainment Group ===
On April 1, 2015, Blue Star Media, LLC under the direction of Sanjay Syal as CEO purchased VEE Corporation with Egan continuing as a consultant. In 2015, VEE Corporation and Blue Star Media, a producer and promoter of consumer shows and events, became VStar Entertainment Group. In August 2015, the company agreed to partner with the Pro Football Hall of Fame for a mobile tour. In April 2016, Vstar hired Eric Grilly as CEO from Comcast Sports Group.

In November 2016, Sesame Workshop announced an agreement with Feld Entertainment for a new Sesame Street Live show, thus ending VStar's arena version in July 2017. The company continues to support and produce other Sesame Street shows for various locations, and the United Service Organizations tour, while still providing costumes.

In January 2017, Vstar acquired Cirque Productions, based in South Florida. Neil Goldberg, Cirque Productions founder and Broadway director, was retained as president of Cirque Dreams.

==== Aftermath ====
On July 5, 2018, Cirque du Soleil Entertainment Group announced that it was acquiring VStar.

On June 29, 2020, Cirque du Soleil filed for bankruptcy in Canada. Three days later, on July 1, 2020, they filed for Chapter 15 bankruptcy.

== Productions ==
- Muppets:
  - Sesame Street Live (September 17, 1980 – July 2017) (a longer list of Sesame Street Live is at this page.)
  - The Muppet Show
    - on tour 1 (1984-1985)
    - on tour 2 (1985-1986)
    - Muppet Babies:
      - Muppet Babies Live (1986-1987)
      - Muppet Babies' Magic Box (1987-1988)
      - Where's Animal? (1988-1990)
  - Bear in the Big Blue House
    - Surprise Party (2001-2002) (Note: A production from the Bear in the Big Blue House: Surprise Party tour was filmed at the Toronto Centre for the Arts in Toronto, Ontario in September 2002, and released on April 1, 2003, on VHS & DVD by Columbia TriStar Home Entertainment. One Muppet stage show was taped there from October 16–20, 2002. Neither production has been released since Disney's acquisition of The Muppets in April 2004.)
    - A First Time for Everything (2003-2004)

=== Cirque Dreams ===
- Cirque Dreams Holidaze (2007–present)
- Cirque Jungle Fantasy
- Cirque Dreams & Dinner, two Norwegian Cruise Line shows
- Cirque Dreams Rocks
- Cirque Dreams Unwrapped
- Cirque Dreams Revealed

=== Nickelodeon ===
- Paw Patrol Live! (2016 -)
  - Race to the Rescue (2016 -)
  - The Great Pirate Adventure (2017 -)
  - Heroes Unite (2023 -)
- Bubble Guppies Live! Ready to Rock (2017-2018)
- Baby Shark's Big Broadwave Tour (2024)

==== Nick Jr. ====
- Nick Jr. Live! Move To The Music (2019-2022)

=== Others ===
- Curious George Live! (2009-2010; Canada 2010–2011)
- Discover the Dinosaurs (December 2011) Blue Star Media
  - tented version (2014-) held at fairs
  - Ice Age exhibit (December 2014- ) adds on to the main exhibition
  - stage show, adds on to the main show
  - Unleashed
- My Little Pony Live: The World's Biggest Tea Party (2006-2008)
- Dragon Tales Live - Missing Music Mystery (2001-2006)
- Care Bears Live - Caring and Sharing Friends (2005-2006)
- Kidz Bop World Tour (2007-2008)
- Barney Live in Concert – Birthday Bash! (November 19, 2010 - December 2011)
- Hello Kitty's Supercute Friendship Festival (May 29, 2015 – 2016)
- Trolls Live! (November 16, 2019 – 2022)

=== Sports ===
- "Honor the Heroes" tour (October 17, 2015-) football Hall of Fame inductees on the tour included Tim Brown, Joe Greene, Charles Haley, Randall McDaniel, Warren Moon and Fran Tarkenton. Tour consisted of four attractions: Legacy Hall, Traditions Stage, Impact Zone and Hall of Fame Locker Room, a store. The hall has holographic busts, football memorabilia and feature multimedia stores. The stage had NFL Films large-screen productions plus "chalk talk" sessions and hourly kids press conferences. The Zone is a football skill and activities test area.
- NBA Jam

== Units ==
- VStar Production Services: creates and manufactures exhibits, props and sets for corporate and entertainment events and museums
- VStar Costumes & Creatures: creates and manufactures costumes and puppets for special events, sports teams and other stage productions.
