= Evelyn Payne Davis =

- Born: Evelyn Aramburo; December 27, 1921; New Orleans, Louisiana, U.S.
- Died: January 10, 1997 (aged 75); Mount Sinai Beth Israel, New York, U.S.
- Education: Hunter College
- Occupations: Founder and President, New York Coalition of 100 Black Women
- Spouses: Mynor Payne (until 1968, his death); Charles Davis

Evelyn Payne Davis (born Evelyn Aramburo; December 27, 1921 – January 10, 1997) was an American community organizer, nonprofit executive and founder of the New York chapter of the National Coalition of 100 Black Women volunteer organization. She is best known for her role as an ambassador for the children's television program Sesame Street within inner-city African American neighborhoods in the late 1960s.

== Early life and education ==
Davis was born Evelyn Aramburo in New Orleans, and at an early age moved to New York City with her family, settling in Harlem. She attended Hunter High School and graduated from Hunter College in the City of New York. After college, she became active in President Lyndon B. Johnson's War on Poverty, volunteering in local programs and joining the New York chapter of the Urban League.

== Career ==
In 1969, as executives at Children's Television Workshop were devising a marketing strategy for Sesame Street (then an experimental television venture), CTW founder Joan Ganz Cooney was in need of someone who was intimately familiar with inner-city black communities, and who could communicate to families the benefits and aims of the new program. Sesame Street at the time was being broadcast on UHF networks, which were fraught with viewer accessibility and regulatory issues. To find out how to maximize the show's viewership among African Americans, Cooney dialed James E. Booker, a prominent New York-based black publicist, who in turn contacted Davis, who at the time was the director for fund development at the New York Urban League. After meeting with Cooney, Davis agreed to head Sesame Street's black viewer outreach, taking on the position of vice president of CTW's Community Education Services division. Davis's efforts succeeded: by the time Sesame Street reached its tenth anniversary in 1979, the program was reaching more than 90 percent of children in low-income urban areas.

In addition to her work with Sesame Street and CTW, Davis worked to improve the plight of African American women and children in New York City. In the wake of the turbulent 1968 King assassination riots, Davis and other black women community leaders joined to create the New York chapter of the Coalition of 100 Black Women; she became the organization's first president in 1972.

== Death ==
Davis died at the age of 75 from lung cancer in 1997. She was survived by a son, stepdaughter and two granddaughters.
