= Gerald S. Lesser =

American psychologist (1926-2010)

- Born: Gerald Samuel Lesser; August 22, 1926; Queens, New York, U.S.
- Died: September 23, 2010 (aged 84); Lexington, Massachusetts, U.S.
- Known for: Sesame Workshop and Sesame Street
- Spouse: Stella Scharf

Gerald Samuel Lesser (August 22, 1926 – September 23, 2010) was an American psychologist who served on the faculty of Harvard University from 1963 until his retirement in 1998. Lesser was one of the chief advisers to the Children's Television Workshop (CTW, later known as the Sesame Workshop) in the development and content of the educational programming included in the children's television program Sesame Street. At Harvard, he was chair of the university's Human Development Program for 20 years, which focused on cross-cultural studies of child rearing, and studied the effects of media on young children. In 1974, he wrote Children and Television: Lessons From Sesame Street, which chronicled how Sesame Street was developed and put on the air. Lesser developed many of the research methods the CTW used throughout its history and for other TV shows. In 1968, before the debut of Sesame Street, he led a series of content seminars, an important part of the "CTW Model", which incorporated educational pedagogy and research into TV scripts and was used to develop other educational programs and organizations all over the world. He died in 2010, at the age of eighty-four.

== Early life and professional career ==
Lesser was born on August 22, 1926, in Queens. The younger of two children, he grew up in the Jamaica neighborhood of Queens and graduated from Jamaica High School. After two years at Columbia University, he served in the United States Navy during World War II and returned to finish his undergraduate degree and earn a master's in psychology at Columbia. He earned a Ph.D. from Yale University in child development and psychology in 1952, studying the effects of visual media on children and the design of educational programming. He married Stella Scharf in 1953.

Lesser taught education at Adelphi University and Hunter College, until hired by the Harvard School of Education (HSE) in 1963, where he taught developmental psychology and its application to education. He was also chair of Harvard's Human Development Program for 20 years, which focused on cross-cultural studies of child rearing and was responsible for recruiting developmental psychologists and cultural anthropologists who influenced the studies of child development and education in the U.S. The HSE honored Lesser with a professorship, the Gerald S. Lesser Professor in Early Childhood Development; former Harvard dean Kathleen McCartney was a recipient. Lesser retired in 1998, and was a professor emeritus at Harvard until his death. Lesser's colleagues reported that he had a big impact on his students and colleagues. Even though he worked all over the world, he remained dedicated to his students and "remained an integral presence in the lives of his graduate students".

"My own professional background is in the study of how children develop. In addition, as a psychologist at Harvard's Graduate School of Education, I had been trying to teach university students not only basic facts and theories of development psychology but also how these ideas might be applied to the education of children".

— Lesser in his 1974 book Children and Television: Lessons From Sesame Street

Lesser was one of the first scholars to study the effect of television on young children. He was hired in 1961 by NBC as an educational consultant for the TV show Exploring, which was created in response to Federal Communications Commission (FCC) chairman Newton Minow's charge to the networks to create more quality shows for children. Lesser studied how Exploring helped children learn in order to help the producers improve it, observed children while they watched it, and was able to see how TV shows were produced. Lesser's experiences at NBC led to his involvement with the development of Sesame Street.

In 1964, Lesser wrote, with Gordon Fifer and Donald H. Clark, Mental Abilities of Children in Different Social and Cultural Groups. Random House published his 1974 book Children and Television: Lessons From Sesame Street, which was called a "how-to" in creating and producing a children's television show, and was an account of the hard work and dedication required to put Sesame Street on the air.

== Sesame Street ==
In 1967, Lesser was asked to help develop and lead the research department of the newly formed Children's Television Workshop (CTW, later the Sesame Workshop), the organization responsible for the production of Sesame Street and other educational television programs. He was invited by Carnegie Foundation vice-president and Sesame Street co-creator Lloyd Morrisett, whom he had met while they were both psychology students at Yale. At first, Lesser was skeptical about the new show's potential and its ability to teach children; according to Morrisett, "he took some convincing". As Lesser later reported, he would be involved only if he was able to make a real contribution. When he saw that Morrisett and his co-creator, Joan Ganz Cooney, were serious about developing goals and a curriculum for the new show, and that it would be an "experimental venture in education by television", he became the first chairman of the CTW's advisory board, a position he held from 1967 to 1997. Lesser was skeptical about Cooney's qualifications as CTW's first CEO, although by the time he wrote Children and Television in 1974, she stated in the book's foreword, "...I couldn't begin to measure how proud I am to be Gerry Lesser's colleague and how happy I am to know the pleasure of his company".

According to The New York Times, Lesser "poured the pedagogy into [Sesame Street], helping ensure from the start that the new, experimental venture in education by television would be both enjoyable and instructive". Fellow CTW researchers Edward Palmer and Shalom M. Fisch credited Lesser, along with Cooney and Morrisett, as a main architect of the show, and stated that "its extensive use of innovative television techniques meant that it would be highly experimental in nature". Lesser and Palmer developed many of the research methods used to study the show's impact on children throughout the show's history. According to Sesame Workshop CEO Gary Knell, Lesser "trail blazed a path for an entire industry" and "set the standard for education's intersection with media". Knell also stated that Lesser challenged the conventional wisdom of the time that television could not teach young children, and proved that "TV was something organic in itself; it was a technological species that lived under its own rules of engagement".

Beginning in June 1968, the CTW conducted a series of seminars at Harvard and in Manhattan, which were led by Lesser. These seminars became an important aspect of "the CTW model", which incorporated educational pedagogy and research into TV scripts and was used to develop other educational programs and organizations all over the world. The purpose of the seminars was to expose the production team and other filmmakers and illustrators involved in the creative aspects of the new show to scholars, educators, and experts, and to encourage that both groups work together to create a curriculum and goals for the new show. The production team was skeptical regarding the place of research and objective analysis in the production of a television show, but Lesser's previous experience in television, his warm, informal, unpretentious, and collaborative manner, and his proficiency in leading the meetings, convinced them. CTW researcher Keith Mielke stated, "He was masterful at running meetings. He was never stiff and formal, but casual and friendly". According to producer Sam Gibbon, despite the participants' personalities, experiences, and dispositions, Lesser was the only reason the seminars were successful. Lesser set the meetings' tone and agenda, and recruited the participants. He stated, "The message was clear; we were there to work. No pretension was going to be allowed".

Lesser never appeared on Sesame Street, but he did appear in the promotional films the CTW created to persuade television stations to air the program. He worked on other CTW shows, including 3-2-1 Contact, Square One TV, and Ghostwriter, and was involved in developing versions of Sesame Street created in other countries.

== Death ==
A resident of Lexington, Massachusetts, Lesser died at the age of 84 on September 23, 2010, in Burlington, Massachusetts, due to a cerebral hemorrhage.

== Awards ==
- 1970: Guggenheim Fellow
- 1974: Distinguished Contribution Award, the American Psychological Association
- 1986: Visiting professor, the Institute for Communications Research, Keio University
- 1988, 1990: Senior fellow, Gannet Center for Media Studies
- 1992: James McKeen Cattell Fellow Award

== Works ==
- Wittenborn, J. R., Elaine G.Bell, and Gerald S. Lesser (1951), "Symptom patterns among organic patients of advanced age". Journal of Clinical Psychology, 7, pp. 328–331. doi: 10.1002/1097-4679(195110)7
- Wittenborn, J.R. and Gerald S. Lesser (October 1951). "Biographical factors and psychiatric symptoms". Journal of Clinical Psychology, 7 (4), pp. 317–322.doi: 10.1002/1097-4679
- Lesser, Gerald S. (September 1957). "The relationship between overt and fantasy aggression as a function of maternal response to aggression". The Journal of Abnormal and Social Psychology, 55 (2), pp. 218–221. doi: 10.1037/h0042743
- _____ (1958). "Conflict analysis of fantasy aggression". Journal of Personality, 26, pp. 29–41. doi: 10.1111/j.1467-6494.1958.tb01568.x
- _____ (1958). "Application of Guttman's scaling method to aggressive fantasy in children". Educational and Psychological Measurement, 18, pp. 543–551. doi: 10.1177/001316445801800308
- Abelson, Robert P. and Gerald S. Lesser (1959). "The Measurement of Persuasibility in Children". In Personality and Persuasibility, Irving L. Janis, ed. New Haven, Connecticut: Yale University Press, pp. 141–166
- _____ (1959). "A Developmental Theory of Persusibility".
- Lesser, Gerald S. and Robert P. Abelson (1959). "Personality Correlates of Persuasibility in Children".
- _____ (February 1959). "The relationships between various forms of aggression and popularity among lower-class children". Journal of Educational Psychology, 50 (1), pp. 20–25. doi: 10.1037/h0040182
- _____ (February 1959). "Population differences in construct validity". Journal of Consulting Psychology, 23 (1), pp. 60–65. doi: 10.1037/h00434853
- _____ (1959). "Religion and the Defensive Responses in Children's Fantasy", Journal of Projective Techniques, 23 (1), pp. 64–68. doi: 10.1080/08853126.1959.10380897
- _____ (1961). "Custom-Making Projective Tests for Research". Journal of Projective Techniques, 25 (1), pp. 21–31. doi: 10.1080/08853126.1961.10381002
- _____ (July 1962). "The Identification of Gifted Elementary School Children with Exceptional Scientific Talent", Educational and Psychological Measurement, 22, pp. 349–364. doi: 10.1080/0020486640020305
- Lesser, Gerald S., Rhoda N.Krawitz, and Rita Packard (January 1963). "Experimental arousal of achievement motivation in adolescent girls". The Journal of Abnormal and Social Psychology, 66 (1), pp. 59–66. doi: 10.1037/h0042942
- Lesser, Gerald S., Kristine M. Rosen‐thai, Sally E. Polkoff and Marjorie B. Pfankuch (1963). "Some Effects of Segregation in the Schools", Equity & Excellence in Education', 2 (3), pp. 20–26. doi: 10.1080/0020486640020305
- French, Elizabeth and Gerald S. Lesser (February 1964). "Some characteristics of the achievement motive in women." The Journal of Abnormal and Social Psychology, 68 (2), pp. 119–128. doi: 10.1037/h0041417
- Stoller, Nathan, Gerald S. Lesser, and Philip I. Freedman (Summer 1964). "A comparison of methods of observation in preservice teacher training". AV Communication Review, 12 (2), pp 177–197
- Lesser, Gerald S., Gordon Fifer, and Donald H. Clark (1965). "Mental Abilities of Children from Different Social-Class and Cultural Groups". Monographs of the Society for Research in Child Development, 30 (4), pp. 1–115
- Lesser, Gerald S. and Herbert Schueler (Fall 1966). "New media research in teacher education". AV Communication Review, 14 (3), pp. 318–361
- Stodolsky, Susan S.and Gerald S. Lesser (Winter 1967). "Learning Patterns in the Disadvantaged". Harvard Educational Review, 37 (4), pp. 546–593
- Fort, Jane G., Jean C. Watts, and Gerald S. Lesser (March 1969). "Cultural Background and Learning in Young Children", The Phi Delta Kappan, 50 (7), pp. 386–389
- Kandel, Denise B. and Gerald S. Lesser (April 1969). "Parental and Peer Influences on Educational Plans of Adolescents". American Sociological Review 34 (2), pp. 213–223
- _____ (May 1969). "Parent-Adolescent Relationships and Adolescent Independence in the United States and Denmark". Journal of Marriage and Family 31 (2), pp. 348–358
- _____ (February 1972). "Marital Decision-Making in American and Danish Urban Families: A Research Note". Journal of Marriage and Family 34 (1), pp. 134–138
- _____ (Summer 1972). "Learning, Teaching, and Television Production for Children: The Experience of Sesame Street", Harvard Educational Review, 42 (2), pp. 232–272
- _____ (1974). Children and Television: Lessons From Sesame Street. New York: Vintage Books. ISBN 0-394-71448-2
- Palmer, Edward L., Milton Chen, and Gerald S. Lesser (1976). "Sesame Street: Patterns of International Adaptation". Journal of Communication, 26, pp. 108–123. doi: 10.1111/j.1460-2466.1976.tb01389.x
- _____ (Feb 1976). "Applications of psychology to television programming: Formulation of program objectives". American Psychologist, 31 (2), pp. 135–136. doi: 10.1037/0003-066X.31.2.135
- Lesser, Gerald S. and Joel Schneider (2001). "Creation and Evolution of the Sesame Street Curriculum". In "G" is for Growing: Thirty Years of Research on Children and Sesame Street. Mahweh, New Jersey: Lawrence Erlbaum Publishers, pp. 25–38. ISBN 0-8058-3395-1
