= Edward L. Palmer =

American media educator (1933–1999)

Dr. Edward L. Palmer (1933–1999) was a media educator, researcher, author, and advocate, with extensive international experience in media planning and applications. He was a native of Oregon, held a Ph.D. degree in Educational Measurement and Research Design from Michigan State University, and held university appointments at Florida State University, Harvard University, and the Annenberg School for Communications at the University of Pennsylvania.

Palmer shared in founding the Children's Television Workshop (CTW) and Sesame Street, beginning as a general researcher. He was vice president of research at CTW for 19 years.

While at CTW, Palmer played a role in the creation of three adult TV series – the Feeling Good health series, an adult drama series on U.S. history called The Best of Families, and the 50-episode Latin American Health Minutes – in addition to The Electric Company, a children's TV series on reading; 3-2-1 Contact, a children's TV series on science; and numerous overseas adaptations of Sesame Street.

Palmer participated as a producer of Al Manaahil ("The Sources"), a TV series created by CTW in Jordan to teach reading of Arabic to Arab children and adults, and was a consultant to the Johns Hopkins University Center for Communication Programs on the creation of The Equatorial Trilogy, three 75-minute made-for-TV feature films produced in Indonesia on the subject of health and the environment.

Palmer died on 1 August 1999, at a hospice in Ithaca, New York.
