= Sesame Workshop =

American children's media producer

- Logo used since 2018
- Founded: May 20, 1968; 58 years ago
- Founders: Joan Ganz Cooney; Lloyd Morrisett
- Type: Non-profit
- Tax ID no.: 13-2655731
- Legal status: 501(c)(3)
- Headquarters: 1900 Broadway, New York, NY 10023 1 Lincoln Plaza
- Location: New York City, US
- Region served: Worldwide
- President: Sherrie Westin
- CEO: Sherrie Westin
- Subsidiaries: Sesame Street Inc. Sesame Workshop Communications Inc. Sesame Workshop Initiatives (India) Private Limited; Sesame Street Brand Management and Services (Shanghai)
- Revenue: US$104,728,963 (2014)
- Expenses: US$111,255,622 (2014)
- Employees: 813 (2013)
- Website: sesameworkshop.org
- Formerly called: Children's Television Workshop (CTW) (1968–2000)

Sesame Workshop (SW), originally known as the Children's Television Workshop (CTW), is an American nonprofit educational television production and media company that has been responsible for the production of several educational children's programs—including its first and best-known, Sesame Street—that have been televised internationally. Joan Ganz Cooney and Lloyd Morrisett developed the idea to form an organization to produce the Sesame Street television series. They spent two years, from 1966 to 1968, researching, developing, and raising money for the new series. Cooney was named as the Workshop's first executive director, which was termed "one of the most important television developments of the decade."

Sesame Street premiered on National Educational Television (NET) as a series run in the United States on November 10, 1969, and moved to NET's successor, the Public Broadcasting Service, in late 1970. The Workshop was formally incorporated in 1970. Gerald S. Lesser and Edward L. Palmer were hired to perform research for the series; they were responsible for developing a system of planning, production, and evaluation, and the interaction between television producers and educators, later termed the "CTW model". The CTW applied this system to its other television series, including The Electric Company and 3-2-1 Contact. The early 1980s were a challenging period for the Workshop; difficulty finding audiences for their other productions and a series of bad investments harmed the organization until licensing agreements stabilized its revenues by 1985.

Following the success of Sesame Street, the CTW developed other activities, including unsuccessful ventures into adult programs, the publications of books and music, and international co-productions. In 1999 the CTW partnered with MTV Networks to create an educational channel called Noggin. They sold their stake in the channel to Viacom (owner of MTV Networks) in 2002. The Workshop produced a variety of original series for Noggin, including The Upside Down Show, Sponk! and Out There. In June 2000, the CTW changed its name to Sesame Workshop to better represent its activities beyond television.

By 2005, income from the organization's international co-productions of the series was $96 million. By 2008, the Sesame Street Muppets accounted for $15–17 million per year in licensing and merchandising fees. Sherrie Westin is the president of the company, starting in 2021.

== History ==
=== Background ===
During the late 1960s, 97% of all American households owned a television set, and preschool children watched an average of 27 hours of television per week. Early childhood educational research at the time had shown that when children were prepared to succeed in school, they earned better grades and learned more effectively. Children from low-income families, however, had fewer resources than children from higher-income families to prepare them for school. Research had shown that children from low-income, minority backgrounds tested "substantially lower" than middle-class children in school-related skills, and that they continued to have educational deficits throughout school. The topic of developmental psychology had grown during this period, and scientists were beginning to understand that changes of early childhood education could increase children's cognitive growth.

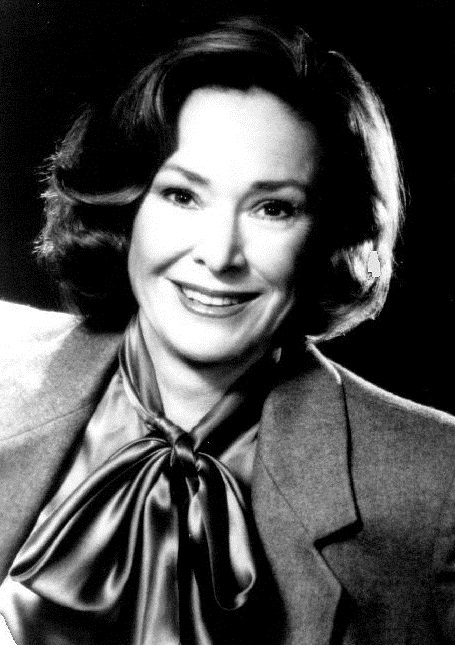
CTW Co-founder Joan Ganz Cooney, in 1985

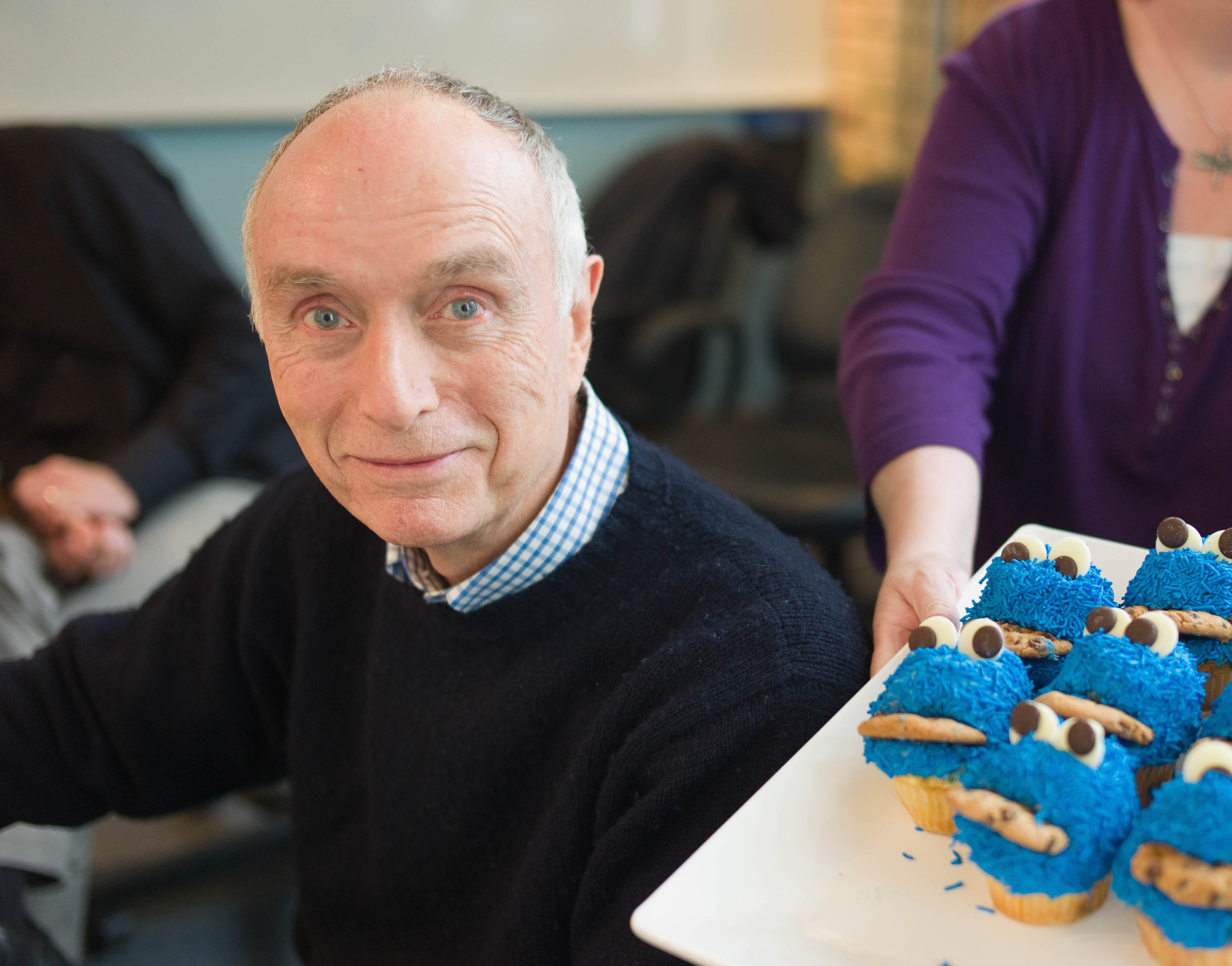
Co-founder Lloyd Morrisett, in 2010

In the winter of 1966, Joan Ganz Cooney hosted what she called "a little dinner party" at her apartment near Gramercy Park. Attending were her husband Tim Cooney, her boss Lewis Freedman, and Lloyd and Mary Morrisett, whom the Cooneys knew socially. Cooney was a producer of documentary films at New York public television station WNDT (now WNET), and won an Emmy for a documentary about poverty in America. Lloyd Morrisett was a vice-president at Carnegie Corporation, and was responsible for funding educational research, but had been frustrated in his efforts because they were unable to reach the large numbers of children in need of early education and intervention. Cooney was committed to using television to change society, and Morrisett was interested in using television to "reach greater numbers of needy kids". The conversation during the party, which according to writer Michael Davis was the start of a five-decade long professional relationship between Cooney and Morrisett, turned to the possibilities of using television to educate young children. A week later, Cooney and Freedman met with Morrisett at the office of Carnegie Corporation to discuss doing a feasibility study for creating an educational television program for preschoolers. Cooney was chosen to perform the study.

In the summer of 1967, Cooney took a leave of absence from WNDT, and funded by Carnegie Corporation, traveled the U.S. and Canada interviewing experts in child development, education, and television. She reported her findings in a fifty-five-page document entitled The Potential Uses of Television in Preschool Education. The report described what the new series, which became Sesame Street, would be like and proposed the creation of a company that managed its production, which eventually became known as the Children's Television Workshop (CTW).

=== Founding ===
For the next two years, Cooney and Morrisett researched and developed the new show, acquiring $8 million funding for Sesame Street, and establishing the CTW. Due to her professional experience, Cooney always assumed the show's natural network would be PBS. Morrisett was amenable to broadcast it by commercial stations, but all three major networks rejected the idea. Davis, considering Sesame Street's licensing income years later, termed their decision "a billion-dollar blunder". Morrisett was responsible for fund acquisition, and was so successful at it that writer Lee D. Mitgang later said that it "defied conventional media wisdom". Cooney was responsible for the show's creative development, and for hiring the production and research staff for the CTW. The Carnegie Corporation provided their initial $1 million grant, and Morrisett, using his contacts, procured additional multimillion-dollar grants from the U.S. federal government, the Arthur Vining Davis Foundations, the Corporation for Public Broadcasting, and the Ford Foundation. (Note: Writer Lee D. Mitgang, in his book about Morrisett's involvement with the Markle Foundation, reported, "The equally important role of Morrisett in ensuring Sesame Street's success and survival never received recognition approaching Cooney's public acclaim".) Morrisett's friend Harold Howe, who was the commissioner for the U.S. Department of Education, promised $4 million, half of the new organization's budget. The Carnegie Corporation donated an additional $1 million. Mitgang stated:

Had Morrisett been any less effective in lining up financial support, Cooney's report likely would have become just another long-forgotten foundation idea.

Funds gained from a combination of government agencies and private foundations protected them from the economic problems experienced by commercial networks, but caused difficulty for procuring future funding.

Cooney's proposal included using in-house formative research that would inform and improve production, and independent summative evaluations to test the show's effect on its young viewers' learning. In 1967, Morrisett recruited Harvard University professor Gerald S. Lesser, whom he had met while they were both psychology students at Yale, to help develop and lead the Workshop's research department. In 1972, the Markle Foundation donated $72,000 to Harvard to form the Center for Research in Children's Television, which served as a research agency for the CTW. Harvard produced about 20 major research studies about Sesame Street and its effect on young children. Lesser also served as the first chairman of the Workshop's advisory board, a position he held until his retirement in 1997. According to Lesser, the CTW's advisory board was unusual because instead of rubber-stamping the Workshop's decisions like most boards for other children's television shows, it contributed significantly to the series' design and implementation. Lesser reported in Children and Television: Lessons from Sesame Street, his 1974 book about the beginnings of Sesame Street and the Children's Television Workshop, that about 8–10% of the Workshop's initial budget was spent on research.

CTW's summative research was done by the Workshop's first research director, Edward L. Palmer, whom they met at the curriculum seminars Lesser conducted in Boston in the summer of 1967. In the summer of 1968, Palmer began to create educational goals, define the Workshop's research activities, and hire his research team. Lesser and Palmer were the only scientists in the U.S. studying the interaction of children and television at the time. They were responsible for developing a system of planning, production, and evaluation, and the interaction between television producers and educators, later called the "CTW model". Cooney observed of the CTW model:

From the beginning, we—the planners of the project—designed the show as an experimental research project with educational advisers, researchers, and television producers collaborating as equal partners.

She described the collaboration as an "arranged marriage".

The CTW devoted 8% of its initial budget to outreach and publicity. In what television historian Robert W. Morrow called "an extensive campaign" that Lesser stated "would demand at least as much ingenuity as production and research", the Workshop promoted the show with educators, the broadcast industry, and the show's target audience, which consisted of inner-city children and their families. They hired Evelyn Payne Davis from the Urban League, whom Michael Davis called "remarkable, unsinkable, and indispensable", as the Workshop's first Vice President of Community Relations and manager of the Workshop's Community Educational Services (CES) division. Bob Hatch was hired to publicize their new series, both before its premiere and to take advantage of the media attention concerning Sesame Street during its first year of production.

According to Davis, despite her involvement with the project's initial research and development, Cooney's installment as CTW's executive director was questionable due to her lack of executive experience, untested financial management skills, and lack of experience with children's television and education. Davis also speculated that sexism was involved, stating, "Doubters also questioned whether a woman could gain the full confidence of a quorum of men from the federal government and two elite philanthropies, institutions whose wealth exceeded the gross national product of entire countries". At first, Cooney did not fight for the position. However she had the help of her husband and Morrisett, and the project's investors soon realized they could not begin without her. She was eventually named to the post in February 1968. As one of the first female executives in American television, her appointment was termed "one of the most important television developments of the decade". The formation of the Children Television Workshop was announced at a press conference at the Waldorf-Astoria Hotel in New York City on 20 May 1968.

After her appointment, Cooney hired Bob Davidson as her assistant; he was responsible for making agreements with approximately 180 public television stations to broadcast the new series. She assembled a team of producers: Jon Stone was responsible for writing, casting, and format; David Connell assumed control of animation and volume production; and Samuel Gibbon served as the show's chief liaison between the production staff and the research team. Stone, Connell, and Gibbon had worked on another children's show, Captain Kangaroo, together. Cooney later said about Sesame Street's original team of producers, "collectively, we were a genius". CTW's first children's show, Sesame Street, premiered on 10 November 1969. The CTW was not incorporated until 1970 because its creators wanted to see if the series was a success before they hired lawyers and accountants. Morrisett served as the first chairperson of CTW's board of trustees, a job he had for 28 years.

=== Early years ===
During the second season of Sesame Street, to capitalize on the momentum the Workshop was enjoying and the attention it received from the press, the Workshop created its second series, The Electric Company, in 1971. Morrisett used the same fund-acquisition techniques as he had used for Sesame Street. The Electric Company stopped production in 1977, but continued in reruns until 1985; it eventually became one of the most widely used TV shows in American classrooms and was revived in 2009. Starting in the early 1970s, the Workshop ventured into adult programming, but found that it was difficult to make their programs accessible to all socio-economic groups. In 1971, it produced a medical program for adults termed Feelin' Good, hosted by Dick Cavett, which was broadcast on public television until 1974. According to writer Cary O'Dell, the show "lacked a clear direction and never found a large audience". In 1977, the Workshop broadcast an adult drama called Best of Families, which was set in New York City around the turn of the 20th century. However, it lasted for only six or seven episodes and helped the Workshop decide to emphasize children's programs only.

The Children's Television Workshop logo from 1983 to 1997.

Throughout the 1970s, the CTW's main non-television efforts changed from promotion to the development of educational materials for preschool settings. Early efforts included mobile viewing units that broadcast the show in the inner cities, in Appalachia, in Native American communities, and in migrant worker camps. In the early 1980s, the CTW created the Preschool Education Program (PEP), whose goal was to assist preschools, by combining television viewing, books, hands-on activities, and other media, in using the series as an educational resource. The Workshop also provided materials to non-English speaking children and adults. Starting in 2006, the Workshop expanded its programs by creating a series of PBS specials and DVDs largely concerning how military deployment affects the families of soldiers. Other efforts by the Workshop concerned families of prisoners, health and wellness, and safety.

According to Cooney and O'Dell, the 1980s were a problematic period for the Workshop. A series of poor investments in video games, motion picture production, theme parks, and other business ventures hurt the organization financially. Cooney brought in Bill Whaley during the late 1970s to work on their licensing agreements, but he was unable to compensate for the CTW's losses until 1986, when licensing revenues stabilized and its portfolio investments increased. Despite financial troubles, the Workshop continued to produce new shows throughout the decade. 3-2-1 Contact premiered in 1980 and ran for seven seasons. The CTW found that finding funding for this series and other science-oriented series like Square One Television, which was broadcast from 1987 to 1992, was easy because the National Science Foundation and other foundations were interested in funding science education.

=== Later years ===
Cooney stepped down as chairman and chief executive officer of the CTW in 1990, when she was replaced by David Britt, who was her "chief lieutenant in the executive ranks through the mid-1990s" and whom Cooney termed her "right-hand for many years". Britt had worked for her at the CTW since 1975 and had served as its president and chief operating officer since 1988. At that time, Cooney became chairman of the Workshop's executive board, which managed its businesses and licensing, and became more involved with the organization's creative efforts. The Workshop had a reorganization in 1995, and dismissed about 12 percent of its staff. In 1998, for the first time in the series' history, they accepted funds from corporations for Sesame Street and its other programs, a policy criticized by consumer advocate Ralph Nader. The Workshop defended the acceptance of corporate sponsorship, stating that it compensated for a decrease of government subsidies.

Also in 1998, the CTW invested $25 million in an educational cable channel called Noggin. Noggin was a joint venture between the CTW and Viacom's MTV Networks, and launched on February 2, 1999. Gary Knell explained that creating a new channel allowed the CTW to more easily "ensure that our programming gets out there." While the Workshop would eventually produce various new shows for Noggin, the channel's early lineup consisted mostly of older shows from the CTW's library.

In 2000, profits earned from the Noggin deal, along with the revenue caused partly by the "Tickle Me Elmo" craze, enabled the CTW to purchase The Jim Henson Company's rights to the Sesame Street Muppets from the German media company EM.TV, which had acquired Henson earlier that year. The transaction, valued at $180 million, also included a small interest Henson had in the Noggin cable channel. Gary Knell stated, "Everyone, most especially the puppeteers, were thrilled that we were able to bring them home. It protected Sesame Street and allowed our international expansion to continue. Owning these characters has allowed us to maximize their potential. We are now in control of our own destiny".

Children's Television Workshop changed its name to Sesame Workshop on June 5, 2000, to better represent its non-television activities and interactive media. Also on June 5, 2000, Gary Knell succeeded Britt as president and CEO of the Workshop; according to Davis, he "presided over an especially fertile period in the nonprofit's history". Under Knell's management, Sesame Workshop produced a variety of original shows for Noggin. The first was an interactive game show called Sponk!, which was meant to model good collaboration and teamwork skills. Sesame Workshop also co-produced a Sesame Street spin-off, Play with Me Sesame, for Noggin. On April 1, 2002, Noggin premiered an overnight block for teenagers called The N. Sesame Workshop created its first-ever teen drama series, Out There, for The N.

In August 2002, Sesame Workshop sold its 50% share of Noggin to Viacom. The buyout was partially caused by SW's need to pay off debt. Sesame Workshop remained involved with the network's programming, as Viacom entered a multi-year production deal with Sesame Workshop shortly after the split and continued to broadcast the company's shows. The last collaboration between Noggin and Sesame Workshop was The Upside Down Show, which premiered in 2006.

Outside of Noggin, Knell was instrumental in the creation of the cable channel Sprout (became Universal Kids, shutting down in March 2025) in 2005. Sprout (launched as PBS Kids Sprout) was founded as a partnership between the Workshop, PBS, HIT Entertainment, and Comcast, the former three of whom contributed programming from their libraries to the new network. After seven years as a partner, the Workshop divested its 15% stake in Sprout to NBCUniversal on December 5, 2012.

In 2007, the Sesame Workshop founded The Joan Ganz Cooney Center, an independent, non-profit organization that studies how to improve children's literacy by using and developing digital technologies "grounded in detailed educational curriculum", just as was done during the development of Sesame Street.

Sesame Workshop wordmark used from 2000 to 2018.

The 2008–2009 recession, which resulted in budget reductions for many nonprofit arts organizations, severely affected the organization; in 2009, dismissed about 20% of its staff. From 2008-2009, Sesame Workshop's total revenue increased by about 2%. In 2013, despite having a record $16,000,000 in investment income, it dismissed 10% of its staff, saying that it was necessary to "strategically focus" their resources because of "today's rapidly changing digital environment". In 2011, Knell left Sesame Workshop to become the chief executive of National Public Radio (NPR). H. Melvin Ming, who had been the organization's chief financial officer since 1999 and chief operating officer since 2002, was named as his replacement. In 2014, H. Melvin Ming retired and was succeeded by former HIT Entertainment and Nickelodeon executive Jeffrery D. Dunn. Dunn's appointment was the first time someone not affiliated with CTW or Sesame Workshop became its manager, although he had associations with the organization previously. In 2021, Dunn retired. It was replaced by Sherrie Rollins Westin, who had served as president of SW's Social Impact and Philanthropy Division for six years.

In 2019, The Hollywood Reporter reported that Sesame Workshop's operating income was approximately $1.6 million, after the majority of its funds earned from grants, licensing deals, and royalties went back into its content, its total operating costs were over $100 million per year. Operating costs included salaries, $6 million in rent for its Lincoln Center corporate offices, its production facilities in Queens, and the costs of producing content for its YouTube channels and other outlets. The organization employed about 400 people, including "several highly skilled puppeteers". Royalties and distribution fees, which accounted for $52.9 million in 2018, made up the Workshop's biggest revenue source. Donations brought in $47.8 million, or 31 percent of its income. Licensing revenue from games, toys, and clothing earned the organization $4.5 million.

On March 6, 2025, Sesame Workshop announced its plans to significantly downsize and restructure its operations in the wake of Warner Bros. Discovery's decision not to renew its U.S. distribution deal for Sesame Street as well as policy changes affecting the organization's federal funding. Sesame Street would later be picked up by Netflix on May 20, 2025.

== Funding sources ==
After Sesame Street's initial success, the CTW began to think about its survival beyond the development and first season of the show, since its funding sources were composed of organizations and institutions that tended to start projects, not sustain them. Although the organization was what Cooney termed "the darling of the federal government for a brief period of two or three years", its first ten years of existence was marked by conflicts between the two; in 1978, the US Department of Education refused to deliver a $2 million check until the last day of the CTW's fiscal year. According to Davis, the federal government was opposed to funding public television, but the Workshop used Cooney's prestige and fame, and the fact that there would be "great public outcry" if the series was de-funded, to withstand the government's attacks on PBS. Eventually, the CTW got its own line item in the federal budget. By 2019, the U.S. government donated about four percent of the Workshop's budget, or less than $5 million a year.

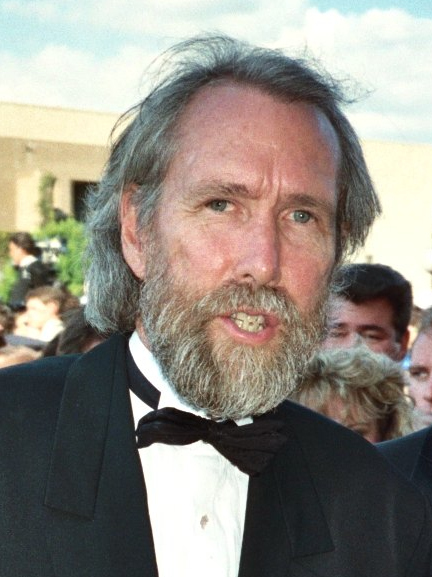
Jim Henson, creator of the Muppets, in 1989

For the first time, a public broadcasting series had the potential to earn a great deal of money. Immediately after its premiere, Sesame Street gained attention from marketers, so the Workshop explored sources such as licensing arrangements, publishing, and international sales, and became, as Cooney envisioned, a "multiple media institution". Licensing became the foundation of, as writer Louise Gikow stated, the Sesame Workshop endowment, which had the potential to fund the organization and future productions and projects. Muppet creator Jim Henson owned the trademarks to the Muppet characters: he was reluctant to market them at first, but agreed when the CTW promised that the profits from toys, books, and other products were to be used exclusively to fund the CTW. The producers demanded complete control of all products and product decisions throughout its history; any product line associated with the series had to be educational, inexpensive, and not advertised during broadcastings of Sesame Street. As Davis reported, "Cooney stressed restraint, prudence, and caution" in their marketing and licensing efforts. In the early 1970s, the CTW negotiated with Random House to establish and manage a non-broadcast materials division. Random House and the CTW named Christopher Cerf to assist the CTW in publishing books and other materials that emphasized the series' curriculum. By 2019, the Sesame Workshop had over 500 licensing agreements, and its total revenue in 2018 was $35 million. A million children play with Sesame Street-themed toys per day.

Soon after the premiere of Sesame Street, producers, educators, and officials of other nations began requesting that a version of the series be broadcast in their countries. CBS executive Michael Dann was required to quit his job at that network due to a change of corporate policy preceding the so-called "rural purge"; upon his ouster, he became vice-president of the CTW and Cooney's assistant. (Note: Dann called the creation of the CTW "one of the most important breakthroughs in the history of the mass media".) Dann then began developing foreign versions of Sesame Street by arranging what were eventually termed co-productions, or independent programs with their own sets, characters, and curriculum goals. By 2009, Sesame Street had expanded into 140 countries; The New York Times reported in 2005 that income from the CTW's international co-productions of the series was $96 million. By 2008, the Sesame Street Muppets accounted for between $15 million and $17 million per year in licensing and merchandising fees, divided between the Workshop and Henson Associates. (Note: As of 2019, Sesame Street has produced 200 home videos and 180 albums.) The Workshop began pursuing funding from corporate sponsors in 1998; consumer advocate Ralph Nader urged parents to protest the move by boycotting the show. In 2018 the Workshop made a deal with Apple to develop original content including puppet series for Apple's streaming service. In 2019, Parade Magazine reported that the organization had received two $100 million grants from the MacArthur Foundation and from the LEGO Foundation; the funds were used to undertake "the largest early childhood intervention in the history of humanitarian response to help refugee children and families".

=== Publishing ===
In 1970, the CTW established a department managing the development of "nonbroadcast" materials based upon Sesame Street. The Workshop decided that all materials its licensing program created would "underscore and amplify" the series' curriculum. Coloring books, for example, were prohibited because the Workshop felt they would restrict children's imaginations. CTW published Sesame Street Magazine in 1970, which incorporated the show's curriculum goals in a magazine format. As with the series, research was performed for the magazine, initially by CTW's research department for a year and a half, and then by the Magazine Research Group in 1975.

Working with Random House editor Jason Epstein, the CTW hired Christopher Cerf to manage Sesame Street's book publishing program. During the division's first year, Cerf earned $900,000 for the CTW. He quit to become more involved with writing and composing music for the series, and was replaced eventually by Bill Whaley. Ann Kearns, vice president of licensing for the CTW in 2000, stated that Whaley was responsible for expanding the licensing to other products, and for creating a licensing model used by other children's series. As of 2019, the Workshop had published over 6,500 book titles. and as researcher Renee Cherow-O'Leary stated in 2001, "the print materials produced by CTW have been an enduring part of the legacy of Sesame Street". In one of these books, for example, the death of the Sesame Street character Mr. Hooper was featured in a book entitled I'll Miss You, Mr. Hooper, published soon after the series featured it in 1983. In 2019, Parade Magazine reported that 20 million copies of The Monster at the End of the Book and Another Monster at the End of this Book had been sold, making them the top two best-selling e-books sold. Its YouTube channel had almost 5 million subscribers.

=== Music ===
According to director Jon Stone, the music of Sesame Street was unlike any other children's program on television. For the first time, the show's songs fulfilled a specific purpose and was related to its curriculum. Cooney observed in her initial report that children had an "affinity for commercial jingles", so many of the show's songs were like television advertisements.

To attract the best composers and lyricists, and to encourage them to compose more music for the series, the CTW allowed songwriters to retain the rights to the songs they wrote. For the first time in children's television, the writers earned lucrative profits, which as Davis reported, "helped the show sustain the level of public interest in the show". Scriptwriters often wrote their own lyrics to accompany their scripts. Songwriters of note were Joe Raposo, Jeff Moss, Christopher Cerf, Tony Geiss, and Norman Stiles. Many of the songs written for Sesame Street have become what writer David Borgenicht termed "timeless classics". These songs included "Can You Tell Me How to Get to Sesame Street?", "I Love Trash", "Rubber Duckie", "Bein' Green", and "Sing". Many Sesame Street songs were recorded by well-known artists such as Barbra Streisand, Lena Horne, Dizzy Gillespie, Paul Simon, and Jose Feliciano. By 2019, there were 180 albums of Sesame Street music produced.

The show's first album, Sesame Street Book & Record, recorded in 1970, was a major success and won a Grammy Award. Parade Magazine reported in 2019 that the show's music had been honored with 11 children's Grammys. According to Gikow, Raposo won three Emmys and four Grammys for his work for the series.

=== International co-productions ===
Soon after Sesame Street debuted in the US, the CTW was asked independently by producers from several countries to produce versions of the series in their countries. Cooney remarked, "To be frank, I was really surprised, because we thought we were creating the quintessential American show. We thought the Muppets were quintessentially American, and it turns out they're the most international characters ever created". She hired former CBS executive Mike Dann, who quit commercial television to become her assistant, as a CTW vice-president. One of Dann's tasks was to manage offers to produce versions of Sesame Street in other countries. In response to Dann's appointment, television critic Marvin Kitman said, "After [Dann] sells [Sesame Street] in Russia and Czechoslovakia, he might try Mississippi, where it is considered too controversial for educational TV". This was a reference to the May 1970 decision by the state's PBS station to not air the series. By summer 1970, Dann had made the first international agreements for what the CTW came to term "co-productions".

The South African co-production Takalani Sesame, with its unique set and some of the show's characters

The earliest international versions were what CTW vice-president Charlotte Cole and her colleagues termed "fairly simple", consisting of dubbed versions of the series with local language voice-overs and instructional cutaways. Dubbed versions of the series continued to be produced if the country's needs and resources warranted it. Eventually, a variant of the CTW model was used to create and produce independently produced preschool television series in other countries. By 2006, there were twenty co-productions. In 2001, there were more than 120 million viewers of all international versions of Sesame Street, and by the show's 50th anniversary in 2019, 190 million children viewed over 160 versions of Sesame Street in 70 languages. In 2005, Doreen Carvajal of The New York Times reported that income from the co-productions and international licensing accounted for $96 million. As Cole and her colleagues reported in 2000, "Children's Television Workshop (CTW) can be regarded as the single largest informal educator of young children in the world".

=== Interactive media ===
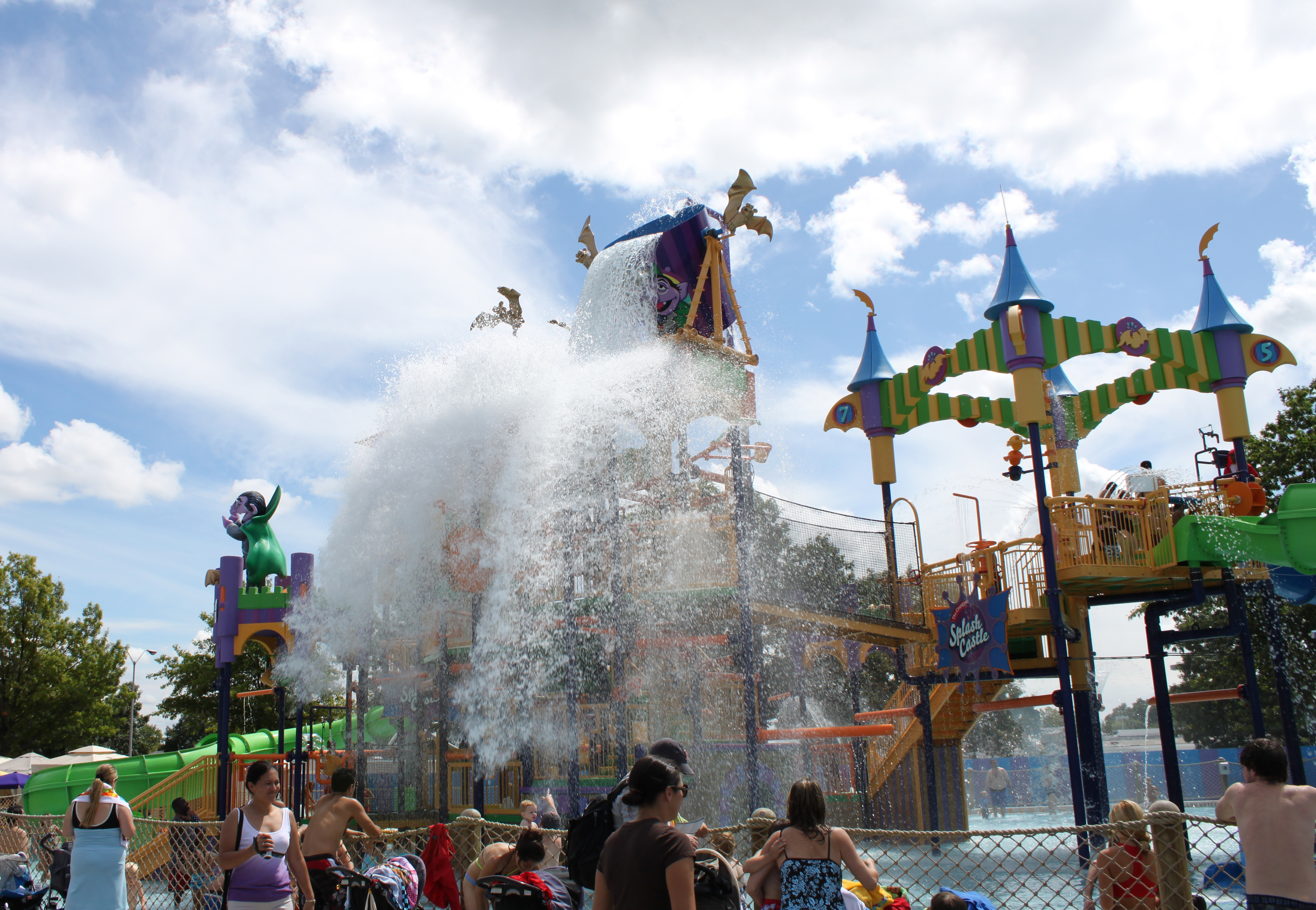
Count's Splash Castle, a water attraction at the amusement park Sesame Place.

Ten years after the premiere of Sesame Street, the CTW began experimenting with new technologies. In 1979, it began to plan the development of a theme park, Sesame Place, which opened in 1980 in Langhorne, Pennsylvania. Three international parks, Parque Plaza Sesamo in Monterrey, Mexico since 1995, Universal Studios Japan, and Vila Sesamo Kids' Land in Brazil were later built. One of the park's features was a computer gallery, which was developed by a small in-house team and included 55 computer programs. The team evolved into the Children's Computer Workshop (CCW) in 1982, which was disbanded and became the Interactive Technologies division of the CTW in the late 1980s. As Sesame Street researcher Shalom M. Fisch stated, no television series could be as interactive as computer games, even "participatory" shows like Blue's Clues or the Sesame Street segment "Elmo's World". The CTW has chosen to take advantage of the contingent feedback inherent in interactive computer games by developing and creating educational software based upon the television series' content and curriculum.

In 2008, Sesame Workshop began to offer clips and full-length episodes on the websites Hulu, YouTube, and iTunes, where "Word on the Street" segments became the most popular webcast. Sesame Workshop won a Peabody Award in 2009 for its website, sesamestreet.org. In 2010, the Workshop began offering, for a subscription fee, a library of over 100 eBooks. The on-line publishing platform was managed by the electronic publishing company Impelsys.

== See also ==
- List of Sesame Workshop productions
- Avenue Q
- Higher Ground Productions
  - Waffles + Mochi
- The Muppets Studio

== Bibliography ==
- Davis, Michael (2008). Street Gang: The Complete History of Sesame Street. New York: Viking Penguin. ISBN 978-0-670-01996-0
- Fisch, Shalom M. and Rosemarie T. Truglio, eds. (2001). "G" Is for Growing: Thirty Years of Research on Children and Sesame Street. Mahweh, New Jersey: Lawrence Erlbaum Publishers. ISBN 0-8058-3395-1
  - Cole, Charlotte F.; Beth A. Richman; Susan A. McCann Brown, "The World of Sesame Street Research", pp. 147–180.
  - Cherow-O'Leary, Renee, "Carrying Sesame Street Into Print: Sesame Street Magazine, Sesame Street Parents, and Sesame Street Books" pp. 197–214.
  - Palmer, Edward and Shalom M. Fisch, "The Beginnings of Sesame Street Research", pp. 3–24
  - Revelle, Glenda L.; Lisa Medoff; Erik F. Strommen, "Interactive Technologies Research at Children's Television Workshop", pp. 215–230
  - Yotive, William and Shalom M. Fisch, "The Role of Sesame Street-Based Materials in Child-Care Settings", pp. 181–196
- Gikow, Louise A. (2009). Sesame Street: A Celebration—Forty Years of Life on the Street. New York: Black Dog & Leventhal Publishers. ISBN 978-1-57912-638-4.
- Lesser, Gerald S. (1974). Children and Television: Lessons From Sesame Street. New York: Vintage Books. ISBN 0-394-71448-2
- Mitgang, Lee D. (2000). Big Bird and Beyond: The New Media and the Markle Foundation. New York: Fordham University Press. ISBN 978-0-8232-2041-0
- Morrow, Robert W. (2006). Sesame Street and the Reform of Children's Television. Baltimore, Maryland: Johns Hopkins University Press. ISBN 0-8018-8230-3
- O'Dell, Cary (1997). Women Pioneers in Television: Biographies of Fifteen Industry Leaders. Jefferson, North Carolina: McFarland & Company. ISBN 0-7864-0167-2.
