= Hergelim Ra'im =

Hergelim Ra'im (Bad Habits) הרגלים רעים

Studio album by Yoni Bloch
- Released: June 2007
- Genre: Melodic rock
- Label: NMC
- Producer: Lizi Cohen

Yoni Bloch chronology
Ulay Ze Ani (2004)	Hergelim Ra'im (Bad Habits) הרגלים רעים (2007)	Al Mi Ani Oved (2008)

Hergelim Ra'im (Hebrew: הרגלים רעים, English translation: Bad Habits) is the second studio album by the Israeli musician Yoni Bloch, released in 2007.

The band members that accompany Bloch in this album are Tomer Lahav (Guitar), Tal Zovleski (Guitar), Ariel Armoni (Drums), Tal Kirshboim (Bass guitar), Daniel Koren (Piano) and others. In this album, comparing to his previous album, Bloch didn't collaborate with the singer Efrat Gosh. Most of the texts of the album were written by Barak Feldaman, in cooperation with Bloch. The songs combine characteristics of rock music, such as electric guitar and yells, along with melodic Piano solos, played by Bloch himself. Some of the album songs released before the official album release, in Bama Hadasha website.

== Song list ==
Most of the songs in the album were written by Barak Feldman and Yoni Bloch. All the songs were composed by Yoni Bloch.

Song name	Length	Writer	Composer
Hergelim Ra'im (Bad Habits)	03:06	Yoni Bloch	Yoni Bloch
Chem'a (Butter)	03:05	Yoni Bloch	Yoni Bloch
Achrayut (Responsibility)	03:13	Barak Feldman	Yoni Bloch
BaDerech LaGehenom (On the Way to Hell)	04:32	Barak Feldman and Yoni Bloch	Yoni Bloch
Hatzaga Yomit (Daily Show)	02:49	Gil'ad Kahana	Yoni Bloch
Achrei SheEfrat Hit'abda (After Efrat Killed Herself)	04:38	Barak Feldman and Yoni Bloch	Yoni Bloch
Amok BeToch HaYam (Deep in the Sea)	04:00	Barak Feldman	Yoni Bloch
HaSod HaKatan (The Little Secret)	03:46	Barak Feldman	Yoni Bloch
Siba La'azov (A Reason to Leave)	03:33	Barak Feldman	Yoni Bloch
Tni Li Chevel (Give me a Lifeline)	02:58	Noa Rotem	Yoni Bloch
Annabel Lee	02:31	Edgar Allan Poe; Hebrew translation: Ze'ev Jabotinsky	Yoni Bloch
Nof Acher (Another view)	05:20	Barak Feldman	Yoni Bloch
