= Al Mi Ani Oved =

Al Mi Ani Oved (Who am I Fooling) על מי אני עובד

Studio album by Yoni Bloch
- Released: November 2008
- Genre: Melodic rock
- Label: NMC
- Producer: Yoni Bloch

Yoni Bloch chronology
Hergelim Ra'im (2007)	Al Mi Ani Oved (Who am I Fooling) על מי אני עובד (2008)

Al Mi Ani Oved (Hebrew: על מי אני עובד, English translation: Who am I Fooling) is the third studio album by the Israeli singer-artist, Yoni Bloch, released in 2008.

The album is composed of two parts; one side of the CD containing the album's eleven songs, and the other side is a DVD containing eleven video clips, one for each of the album's songs. The clips are presenting the songs as an ongoing story of relationship failure between a man and a woman, (the man is probably based on Yoni Bloch himself) resulting in the man's death. The clips were directed by Alon Banari, that also wrote the scripts of the clips, along with Barak Feldman.

The band members that accompany Bloch in the songs are Tomer Lahav (Guitar), Tal Zovleski (Guitar), Tal Cohen (Drums) and Erez Frank (Bass guitar). Vocals are presented by Yael Kraus, that also sang a duet with Bloch in "Shir A'her" (Another Song). Kraus also portrayed the women role in each of the video clips. Bloch's brother, Daniel, Played the drums in two of the eleven songs of the album.

Yoni Bloch composed all the songs in the album. Most of them were written by Barak Feldman, and some written by both Feldman and Bloch. The songs combine characteristics of rock music, such as electric guitar and yells, along with melodic Piano solos.

Furthermore, this album represents the maturing in Bloch's music style. While his first album, "Ulay Ze Ani" (Maybe it's Me), had a humoristic atmosphere of sort, this album characterized in dark and melancholic tunes and texts.

== Song list ==
Song name	Length	Writer	Composer
HaLev Sheli 'Omed Lehitpotzetz (My Heart's Going to Explode)	03:48	Barak Feldman and Yoni Bloch	Yoni Bloch
Yalda Sheli Qt'ana (Little Girl of Mine)	03:19	Barak Feldman	Yoni Bloch
HaQin'a (The Jealousy)	04:05	Yoni Bloch	Yoni Bloch
Ahava Rekhoqa (Far Love)	03:03	Barak Feldman	Yoni Bloch
Melat'ef (Stroking)	02:13	Barak Feldman	Yoni Bloch
Shir Akher (Another Song)	03:41	Barak Feldman	Yoni Bloch
Yesh T'aba'at (There's a Ring)	02:35	Yoni Bloch	Yoni Bloch
Tmuna Met'usht'eshet (Blurred Photo)	04:01	Barak Feldman	Yoni Bloch
Lama At Lo 'Ona Li (Why Won't you answer to Me)	04:29	Barak Feldman and Yoni Bloch	Yoni Bloch
KsheAt Iti (When You're With Me)	03:05	Yoni Bloch	Yoni Bloch
'Al Mi Ani 'Oved (Who am I Fooling)	04:09	Barak Feldman and Yoni Bloch	Yoni Bloch
