= Ulay Ze Ani =

Ulay Ze Ani (Maybe it's Me) Hebrew: אולי זה אני

Studio album by Yoni Bloch
- Released: March 2004
- Genre: Melodic rock
- Length: 51:37
- Label: NMC
- Producer: Ha'im Shemesh

Yoni Bloch chronology
Ulay Ze Ani (Maybe it's Me); Hebrew: אולי זה אני (2004)	Hergelim Ra'im (2007)

Ulay Ze Ani (Hebrew: אולי זה אני, English translation: Maybe it's Me) is the debut album of the Israeli artist Yoni Bloch, released in 2004. The band members that accompany Bloch in this album are Tomer Lahav (Guitar), Or Zovelski (Drums), Tal Kirshboim (Bass guitar), Karolin Lavel (Cello), John Mathias (Viola and Violin) and Efrat Gosh (singing and vocals). Most of the texts of the album were written by Barak Feldaman, in cooperation with Bloch. The songs combine characteristics of rock music, such as electric guitar and yells, along with melodic Piano solos, played by Bloch himself. Some of the album songs released before the official album release, in Bama Hadasha website.

== Song list ==
Song name	Length	Writer	Composer
Hetkef Lev Katan (Little Heart Attack)	3:24	Barak Feldman	Yoni Bloch
Makir Oto ([I] Know Him)	4:33	Barak Feldman	Yoni Bloch
HaPsichologit (The Psychologist)	4:09	Barak Feldman	Yoni Bloch
Lot	5:05	Barak Feldman	Yoni Bloch
Im Lo Hayom, Az Machar (If not Today, Tomorrow)	4:05	Yoni Bloch	Yoni Bloch
Na'im BaChutz (It's Nice Outside)	2:58	Barak Feldman	Yoni Bloch
Ulai Ze Yoni (Maybe It's Yoni)	3:42	Barak Feldman	Yoni Bloch
Napoleon	3:10	Yoni Bloch	Yoni Bloch
Tni LeZe Lipol (Let it Fall)	2:44	Barak Feldman and Yoni Bloch	Yoni Bloch
Tapuzim (Oranges)	2:50	Barak Feldman	Yoni Bloch
Ha'Ikar HaBriut (It's All About the Health)	3:07	Yoni Bloch	Yoni Bloch
BaChatuna Shel Geri (In Geri's Wedding)	3:39	Barak Feldman	Yoni Bloch
Elohim Nechmada (Nice God)	4:31	Yoni Bloch	Yoni Bloch
Ani (I)	3:40	Barak Feldman	Yoni Bloch
HaHashra’a Shel Dafna (Dafna's Inspiration)	2:41	Barak Feldman	Yoni Bloch
