= Yael Kraus =

Israeli singer-songwriter

Yael Kraus יעל קראוס
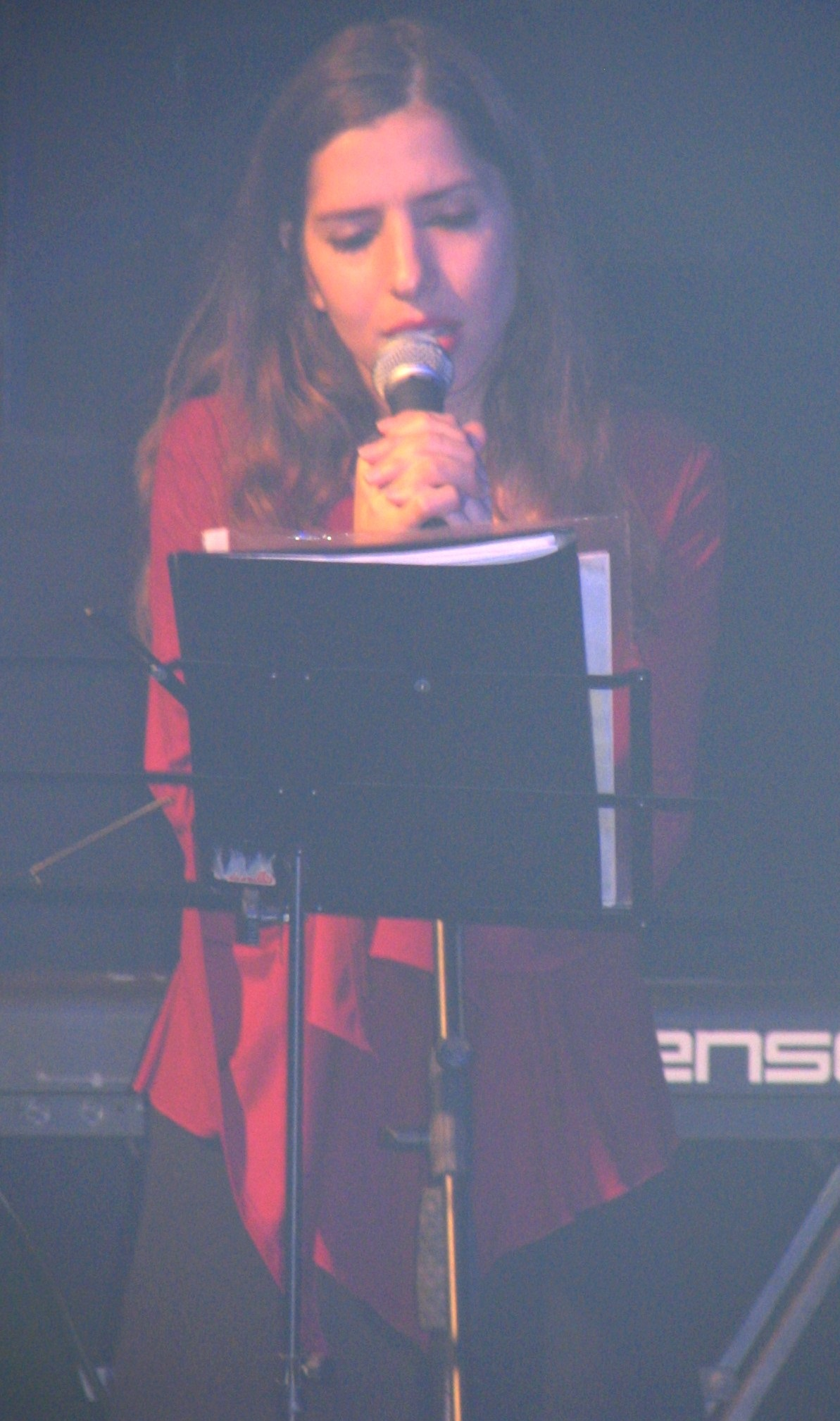
- Kraus performing with Panic Ensemble, 2005

Background information
- Born: November 21, 1977 (age 48)
- Origin: Israel
- Occupation: Singer-songwriter
- Labels: NMC Music; Jonathan Lipitz Music; Earsay Records
- Relatives: Shmulik Kraus (uncle)

Yael Kraus (Hebrew: יעל קראוס; born November 21, 1977) is an Israeli singer-songwriter based in New York City.

== Biography ==
Kraus comes from an artistic family of painters, writers and musicians; the popular singer and songwriter Shmulik Kraus (The High Windows) is her uncle.

Kraus studied traditional Bulgarian singing and classical modern music with avant-garde virtuoso Fred Frith. She's a frequent collaborator with Roy Yarkoni and six other musicians under the art rock act Panic Ensemble performing for the Israel Festival and several European live shows. She collaborated with many Israeli musicians, such as Assaf Amdursky, Yoni Bloch, Ivri Lider and Tzach Drori.

In 2008, she teamed with Noa Goldanski and Michael Frost to record and release Bussa (בוּסה) on NMC Music, an album of bossa nova covers for popular Israeli songs. The same year she also performed the theme song in the TV series On the Fingertips (על קצות האצבעות). Her debut solo album Boutique was released in 2010. It was produced by Daniel Koren, New York City based composer and pianist, co-composed mainly with Ben Hendler and was mixed by Tamir Muskat of the Balkan Beat Box.

== Discography ==
- Boutique (Jonathan Lipitz Music, 2010)
- Bussa (NMC Music, 2008)
- Panic Ensemble (Earsay Records, 2008)
