= Elmo's World =

Segment shown in the children's television program Sesame Street

- Original title card when the segment first began
- Genre: Children's show Educational; Puppet show Segment
- Based on: Elmo by Sesame Street
- Written by: Judy Freudberg (1998–2009)
- Presented by: Kevin Clash; Ryan Dillon
- Starring: Bill Irwin; Michael Jeter (2000–03); Kristin Chenoweth (2001–06); Daniel Koren (2017–21); Daveed Diggs (2017–21); Ilana Glazer (2017–2021)
- Voices of: Andrea Martin (1998–2009); Deborah Grausman (2017–present)
- Opening theme: "Elmo's World Theme Song" (sung to "Elmo's Song" prior to 2017)
- Ending theme: "The ____ Song" (1998–2009) "The Happy Dance" (2017–present)
- Country of origin: United States
- Original language: English
- No. of seasons: 17
- No. of episodes: 64 (+3 specials) (original run); 82 (revival run); Total: 146

Production
- Running time: 15 minutes (1998–2009); 4–5 minutes (2017–present)
- Production companies: Children's Television Workshop (1998–2000); Sesame Workshop (2000–present)

Original release
- Release: November 16, 1998 – present

Elmo's World is a segment featured in the American children's television program Sesame Street. It is always the last segment of an episode (before its "sponsors"—the letter and the number of the day—were announced to close the show), and premiered on November 16, 1998, during the thirtieth season of Sesame Street, as part of a broader structural change to the show. It originally lasted fifteen minutes at the end of each episode. The segment was designed to appeal to younger viewers and to increase ratings, which had decreased in the past decade. The segment is presented from the perspective of a three-year-old child as represented by its host, the Muppet Elmo, performed by Kevin Clash in the original series and Ryan Dillon in the 2017 reboot.

The segment was developed out of a series of workshops that studied changes in the viewing habits of Sesame Street's audience and the reasons for the show's lower ratings. Elmo's World used traditional production elements but had a more sustained narrative. In 2002, Sesame Street's producers changed the rest of the show to reflect its younger demographic and the increase in their viewers' sophistication.

Long-time writer Judy Freudberg came up with the concept of Elmo's World, and writer Tony Geiss and executive producer Arlene Sherman helped develop it. In contrast with the realism of the rest of the show, the segment presented Elmo moving between and combining a live action world and a computer-generated animated world, which looked like "a child's squiggly crayon drawing come to life", with "a stream-of-consciousness feel to it". Elmo's pet goldfish Dorothy and the members of the Noodle family were silent to allow Elmo to do all the talking, and to give children the opportunity to respond to what they saw on the screen. A brief clip from Elmo's World appears in Sesame Street's 2002–2006 intro.

In 2009, production on Elmo's World went on hiatus. Reruns continued until 2012, when it was replaced by Elmo: The Musical. The segment returned in 2017, although each episode now only runs for around 4–5 minutes. Until the show's 56th season in 2025, the revival alternated with two more Elmo-centered segments, Elmo & Tango’s Mysterious Mysteries and Nature Explorers, which were both produced entirely with animation.

== Background ==
By the early 1990s, Sesame Street had been on the air for over 20 years and was, as author Michael Davis put it, "the undisputed heavyweight champion of preschool television". The show's dominance began to be challenged throughout the decade by other television shows for preschoolers such as Barney & Friends, Blue's Clues, and Teletubbies, by the growth of the children's home video industry, and by the increase of thirty-minute children's shows on cable. Sesame Street's ratings declined, so the Children's Television Workshop (CTW) (now Sesame Workshop), (Note: The CTW, the organization responsible for putting the show on the air, changed its name to the Sesame Workshop (SW) in June 2000.) responded by researching the reasons for their lower ratings.

For the first time since the show debuted, the producers and a team of researchers analyzed Sesame Street's content and structure and studied how children's viewing habits had changed. The analysis was conducted during a series of two-week-long workshops and was completed in time for the show's 30th anniversary in 1999. The CTW found that although the show was produced for children between the ages of three and five, its viewers had become more sophisticated since its debut and began watching the show as early as ten months of age. The producers found that the show's original format, which consisted of a series of short clips similar to the structure of a magazine, was not necessarily the most effective way to hold young viewers' attention. They also found that their viewers, especially the younger ones, lost attention with Sesame Street after 40 to 45 minutes.

The first way the CTW addressed the issues raised by their research was by lowering the target age for Sesame Street, from four to three years old. In late 1998, they created a new 15-minute segment entitled Elmo's World, hosted by the Muppet Elmo, that was shown at the end of each episode. (Note: The first episode of Elmo's World aired on November 16, 1998.) The segment used traditional elements (animation, Muppets, music, and live-action film), but had a more sustained narrative. Elmo's World followed the same structure each episode, and depended heavily on repetition. (Note: At first, the same segment was repeated daily for a week, but this practice was dropped at the end of the first season of Elmo's World.) It focused on child-centered topics such as balls and dancing, from the perspective of a three-year-old child, and was "designed to foster exploration, imagination, and curiosity". Instead of an adult providing narration, Elmo led the child through the action.

In 2002, Sesame Street's producers went further in changing the show to reflect its younger demographic and increase in their viewers' sophistication. They decided, after the show's 33rd season, to expand upon the Elmo's World concept by, as San Francisco Chronicle TV critic Tim Goodman called it, "deconstructing" the show. They changed the structure of the entire show to a more narrative format, making it easier for young children to navigate. Arlene Sherman, a co-executive producer for 25 years and one of the creators of Elmo's World, called the show's new look "startlingly different".

== Development and filming ==
Long-time Sesame Street writer Judy Freudberg came up with the idea of creating a segment with "an entirely different format" from the rest of the show during the CTW's workshops, and writer Tony Geiss further developed the idea with her. Freudberg stated that the concept "was radical because we had never veered from that magazine mosaic and had never given any character more than another character to do".

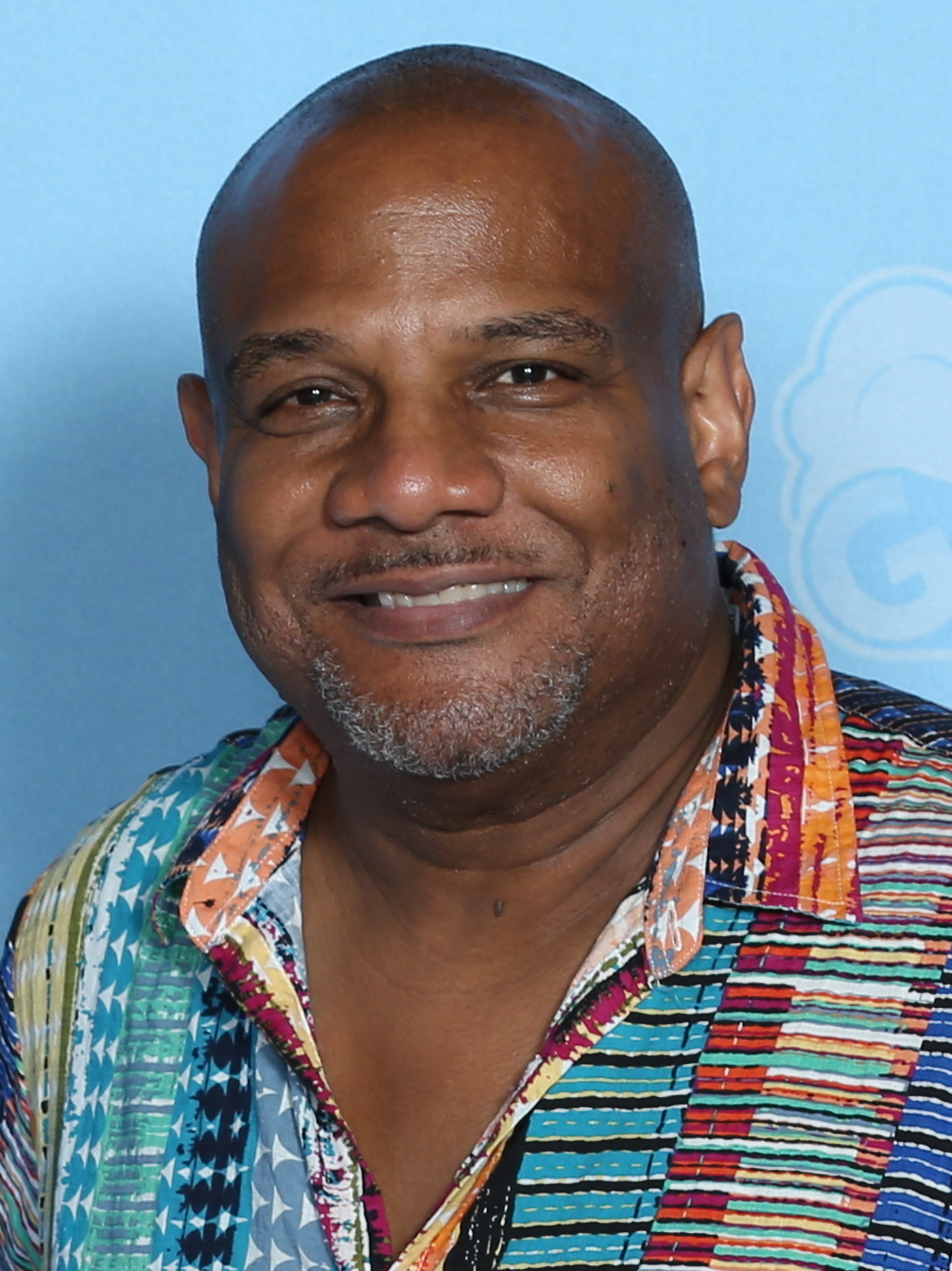
Elmo’s portrayer, Kevin Clash, in 2022

Animator Mo Willems came up with the idea of creating a less-realistic setting compared to the rest of the show. The segment presented Elmo, first portrayed by Kevin Clash and then by Ryan Dillon after its revamp in 2017, moving between and combining two worlds of live action and computer-generated animation, which looked like "a child's squiggly crayon drawing come to life" created by the host, and with "a stream-of-consciousness feel to it". The segment was filmed at a different time than the rest of the season, much of it in front of a blue screen, with animation and digital effects added later. For more complicated shots that showed Elmo's entire body, a puppet called "Active Elmo" was operated with assistance from other puppeteers; the puppet was also filmed in front of a blue screen and edited later.

In addition to Freudberg and Geiss, other writers of Elmo's World included Emily Kingsley and Molly Boylan. The theme song was based upon a song Geiss wrote called "Elmo's Song", with lyrics changed to fit the segment. Writer Louise Gikow and The New York Times called it "a show within a show". Clash called it "a playdate between the child and Elmo", and felt that its intimacy provided an effective teaching tool. He also called it "an instant success". Davis compared Elmo's World with the children's TV show Pee-wee's Playhouse.

The CTW, as it has done throughout its existence and for all the shows it produced, conducted extensive studies on Elmo's World. They found that the segment had high appeal among children, regardless of age, sex, or socioeconomic background. Attention and participation, such as hand-clapping, moving along with the music, and counting along with the characters, increased with repeated viewing.

== Characters ==
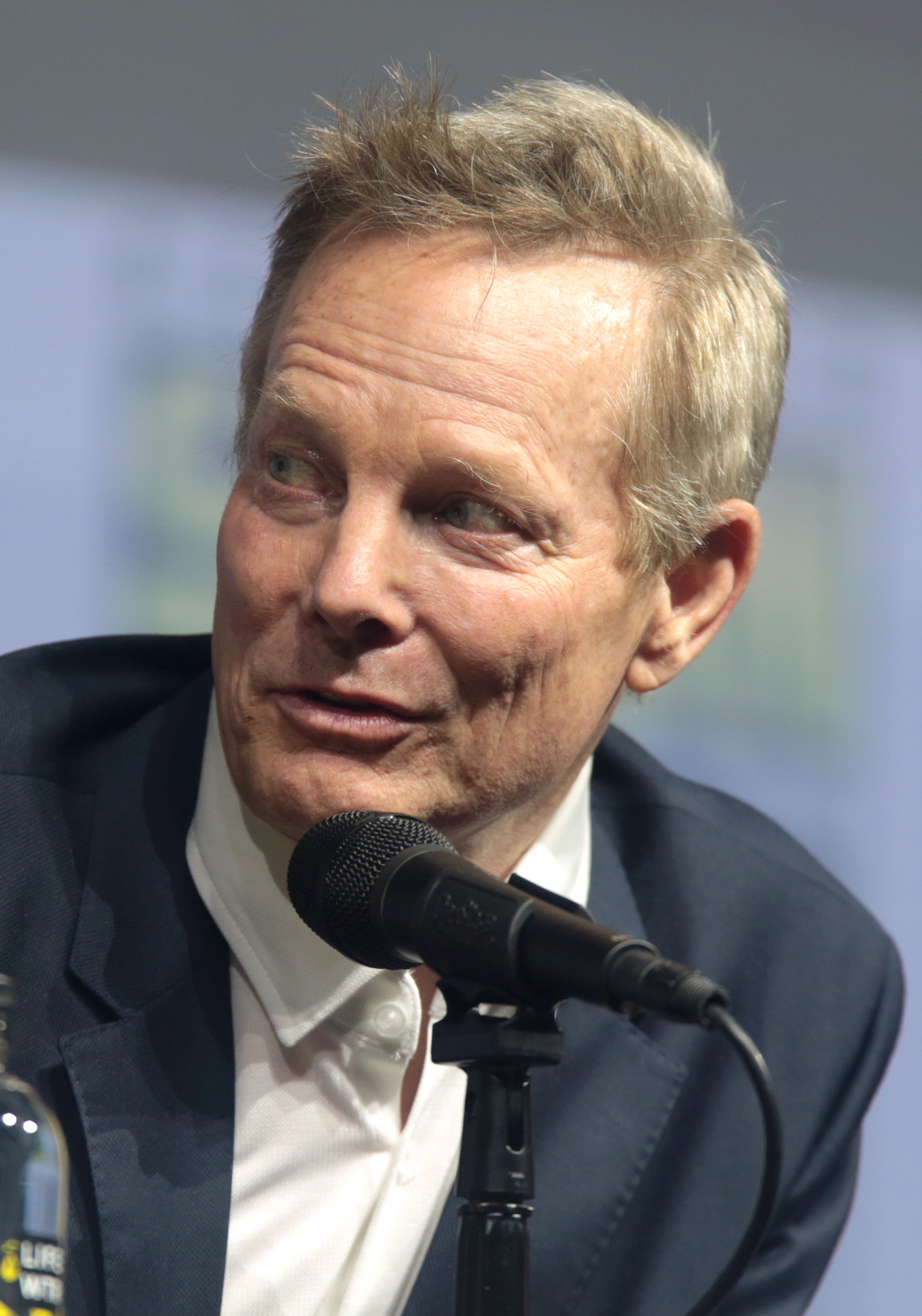
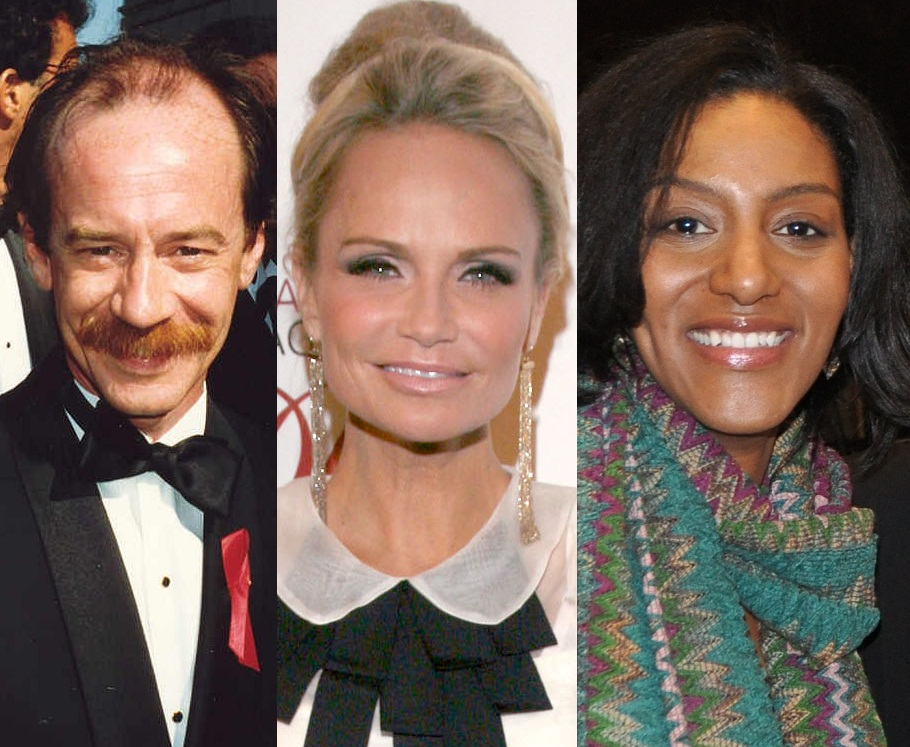
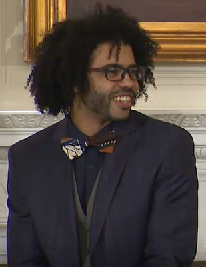
The actors who have played members of the Noodle family: Bill Irwin, Michael Jeter, Kristin Chenoweth, Sarah Jones, and Daveed Diggs

The Muppet Elmo, who represented the three-year-old child, was chosen as host of Elmo's World because he had always tested well with Sesame Street's younger viewers. Elmo was created in 1979 and was performed by various puppeteers, including Richard Hunt, but did not become what his eventual portrayer Kevin Clash called a "phenomenon" until Clash took over the role in 1985. Elmo became, as writer Michael Davis reported, "the embodiment" of Sesame Street, and "the marketing wonder of our age" when five million "Tickle Me Elmo" dolls were sold in 1996. Clash believed the "Tickle Me Elmo" phenomenon made Elmo a household name and led to the Elmo's World segment. Clash called Elmo's World "a colorful, lively celebration of creativity" and "one of the most imaginative endeavors I've ever been involved in". He stated that the segment provided him with new challenges and opportunities for "creative risk-taking".

According to Clash and Gikow, Elmo's pet goldfish Dorothy and the members of the Noodle family were silent in order to allow Elmo to do all the talking, and to give children the opportunity to respond to what they saw on the screen. Dorothy's silence allowed children to fill in the blanks, and her curiosity, which was created and enhanced by Elmo's imagination, allowed the writers and researchers to insert the curriculum lessons they wanted to convey. Up to nine goldfish were used per episode, so they could be replaced as needed. Several fish were needed each season, and the surviving Dorothys were given good homes afterward.

Mr. Noodle was played by Broadway actor Bill Irwin, who had previously worked with Sherman in short films for Sesame Street. When he became unavailable, Sherman asked her friend, Michael Jeter, to replace Irwin as Mr. Noodle's brother Mister Noodle. Jeter played Mister Noodle beginning in 2000, until his death in 2003. Kristin Chenoweth played Mr. Noodle's sister Ms. Noodle, and Sarah Jones played Mr. Noodle's other sister Miss Noodle. As of January 2017, Daveed Diggs and comedian Daniel Koren have played two more of Mr. Noodle's brothers. (Note: Five of the actors playing members of the Noodle family have won Tonys.) According to Freudberg, "Mr. Noodle, who never speaks, is all about trial and error. When you throw him a hat, he acts like he's never seen one before. Kids feel empowered watching him because they can do what he can't."

== End of production and return ==
After Elmo's World temporarily wrapped production in 2009, on the show's 40th season, the producers of Sesame Street began taking steps to increase the age of their viewers and to increase their ratings. By the end of the show's 40th anniversary in 2009, the number of the show's 3-year-old viewers had increased by 41 percent, 4-year-olds by 4 percent, and 5-year-olds by 21 percent. According to The New York Times, executive producer Carol-Lynn Parente "was itching to revamp the final segment" even before production of Elmo's World ended, but was prevented by the apparent satisfaction of the viewers and by tight budgets. They were also reluctant to replace the segment; as writer Joey Mazzarino explained, it was "an emotionally charged process" because Freudberg had become ill and was not present for the discussions about it. (Note: Freudberg died of brain cancer in 2012.)

Elmo's World was replaced by Elmo: The Musical in 2012. Elmo's World continued to appear on repeats of Sesame Street, on DVDs, and on the show's website, which sold products related to the segment. In 2017, the 47th season of Sesame Street began airing on the cable subscription service HBO; Elmo's World returned, in a newly designed segment that ran five minutes at the end of each episode. Steve Youngwood, the Sesame Workshop's CEO, called it "fresh, contemporary".

== Works cited ==
- Clash, Kevin; Brozek, Gary; Mitchell, Louis Henry (2006). My Life as a Furry Red Monster: What Being Elmo has Taught Me about Life, Love and Laughing Out Loud. New York: Random House. ISBN 0-7679-2375-8.
- Davis, Michael (2008). Street Gang: The Complete History of Sesame Street. New York: Viking Penguin. ISBN 978-0-670-01996-0.
- Fisch, Shalom M.; Bernstein, Lewis (2001). "Formative Research Revealed: Methodological and Process Issues in Formative Research". In Fisch, Shalom M.; Truglio, Rosemarie T. (eds.). "G" is for Growing: Thirty Years of Research on Children and Sesame Street. Mahweh, New Jersey: Lawrence Erlbaum Publishers. ISBN 0-8058-3395-1.
- Gikow, Louise A. (2009). Sesame Street: A Celebration— Forty Years of Life on the Street. New York: Black Dog & Leventhal Publishers. ISBN 978-1-57912-638-4.
- Herman, Karen (2004). Puppeteer Kevin Clash Discusses "Elmo's World" (Video).
