= Shemesh =

Shemesh means "Sun" in Hebrew. It may also refer to:

== People ==
- Chaim Shemesh (born 1959), Brazilian-born Israeli music producer and manager
- Erez Shemesh (born 1970), Israeli Olympic competitive sailor
- Ophrah Shemesh (born 1952), Israeli-American artist

== Sports clubs ==
- Bet Shemesh Blue Sox, Israeli baseball team from Bet Shemesh
- Hapoel Beit Shemesh F.C., Israeli football club based at Beit Shemesh
- Ironi Beit Shemesh F.C., Israeli football club based in Beit Shemesh

== Locations ==
- Beit Shemesh, Israeli pre-Biblical city
- Beth Shemesh, name of three distinct biblical places in Israel and one location in Egypt also mentioned in the Hebrew Bible
- Givat Shemesh, village and drug rehabilitation centre in central Israel
- Ramat Beit Shemesh, neighborhood of Beit Shemesh, Israel

== Other ==
- Beit Shemesh Railway Station, Israel Railways station in Beit Shemesh, Israel
- Shamash, solar deity in ancient Semitic religion
- Shapash (redirect from Shemesh (Canaanite goddess)), was the Canaanite goddess of the sun, daughter of El and Asherah
- Shemesh (TV series), Israeli sitcom produced by Teddy Productions and aired on Israeli Channel 2 from 1997 to 2004
