= Chaim Shemesh =

Israeli musical artist

Chaim Shemesh חיים שמש
- Born: 1959 (age 65–66); São Paulo, Brazil
- Website: Chaimshemesh

Chaim Shemesh (Hebrew: חיים שמש; born Jaimi Shams in 1959) is a Brazilian-born Israeli music producer and manager.

Shemesh was born in São Paulo, Brazil. Shemesh is a producer and manager in the Israeli music industry for almost three decades. He started his way in the music industry as a lighting and sound engineer. After three years of studying sound at New School of New York City, he started working as the personal assistant of Yair Nitzani, CEO of Hed Artzi (biggest record company in Israel). While working in Hed Artzi, Shemesh managed to sign and produced some of the most influential artists in the Israeli music industry; Aviv Geffen, Hayehudim, Asaf Amdurski, Tipex, Evyatar Banay, Eifo Hayeled, etc. In 1997, Shemesh started his own record company called Sunshine Records which was active up until 2001 and produced albums for Assaf Amdursky, Yahli Sobol and more. In 2002 Shemesh joined the record company NMC as a content VP, where he managed the company's marketing and public relations and developed new business modules to the music industry (on-line music downloading web sites, artist management systems, etc.). Some of Shemesh's discoveries during his time in NMC were; HaYehudim, Aviv Geffen, Evyatar Banai, Taarovet Escot, Efrat Gosh and Yoni Bloch. By 2005 he founded Chaim Shemesh, a consulting and management of music content company, where continued to manage artists and produce music festivals and special productions; Tel-Aviv unplugged, Beatles festival, Holon Live etc. In 2012, he co-founded with Guy Dayan Goola – creation and promotion smart online content company. During that year he also took part in Israeli talent show, Kochav Nolad, as a member of the judge committee.
