= Mr. Noodle =

Member of Elmo's World

- Sesame Street character
- Mr. Noodle in Elmo's World
- Portrayed by: Bill Irwin

Mr. Noodle and his siblings are characters who appear in the "Elmo's World" segments during the educational children's television program Sesame Street. Mr. Noodle was played by Broadway actor Bill Irwin, who had previously worked with Arlene Sherman, executive producer of Sesame Street and co-creator of "Elmo's World", in short films for the program. The first Mr. Noodle (played by Bill Irwin) is the oldest child of the Noodle siblings.

When Irwin became unavailable due to him being busy with filming for How the Grinch Stole Christmas, Sherman asked Michael Jeter, who was his friend, to replace Irwin as Mr. Noodle's brother Mister Noodle, which he accepted enthusiastically, calling it his favorite role in twenty years. Jeter was in the role beginning in 2000, until his death in 2003. Kristin Chenoweth played Mr. Noodle's sister Ms. Noodle, and Sarah Jones played Mr. Noodle's other sister Miss Noodle. As of 2018, Daveed Diggs and Daniel Koren have played two more of Mr. Noodle's brothers, as well as Ilana Glazer as Mr. Noodle's other sister Miss Noodle.

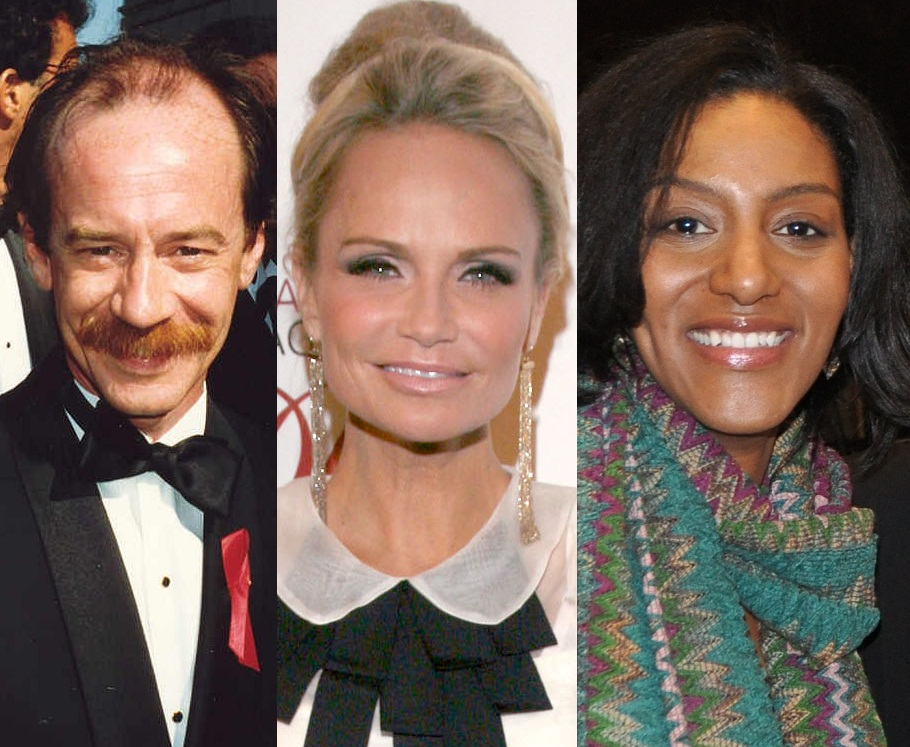
Michael Jeter (left) played Mr. Noodle's brother Mister Noodle. Kristin Chenoweth (middle) played Mr. Noodle's sister Ms. Noodle. Sarah Jones (right) played Mr. Noodle's other sister Miss Noodle.

Writer Louise A. Gikow calls the Noodles "a dynasty of mimes,...in the tradition of great silent film comedians like Charlie Chaplin, Buster Keaton, and Harold Lloyd". They made mistakes, but solved them with the help of Elmo and "enthusiastic kid voice overs", which empowered children and helped them feel smarter than the adults.

They were silent in order to allow Elmo to do all the talking and to give children the opportunity to respond to what they saw on the screen. They would physically and humorously act out their replies to Elmo's questions.

According to writer and "Elmo's World" co-creator Judy Freudberg, "Mr. Noodle, who never speaks, is all about trial and error. When you throw him a hat, he acts like he's never seen one before. Kids feel empowered watching him because they can do what he can't". According to Sesame Street researcher Lewis Bernstein, the characters, whom he called "bungling", gave young viewers "the opportunity to figure it out" before the adults did.
