= Oforia =

Oforia עופר דיקובסקי
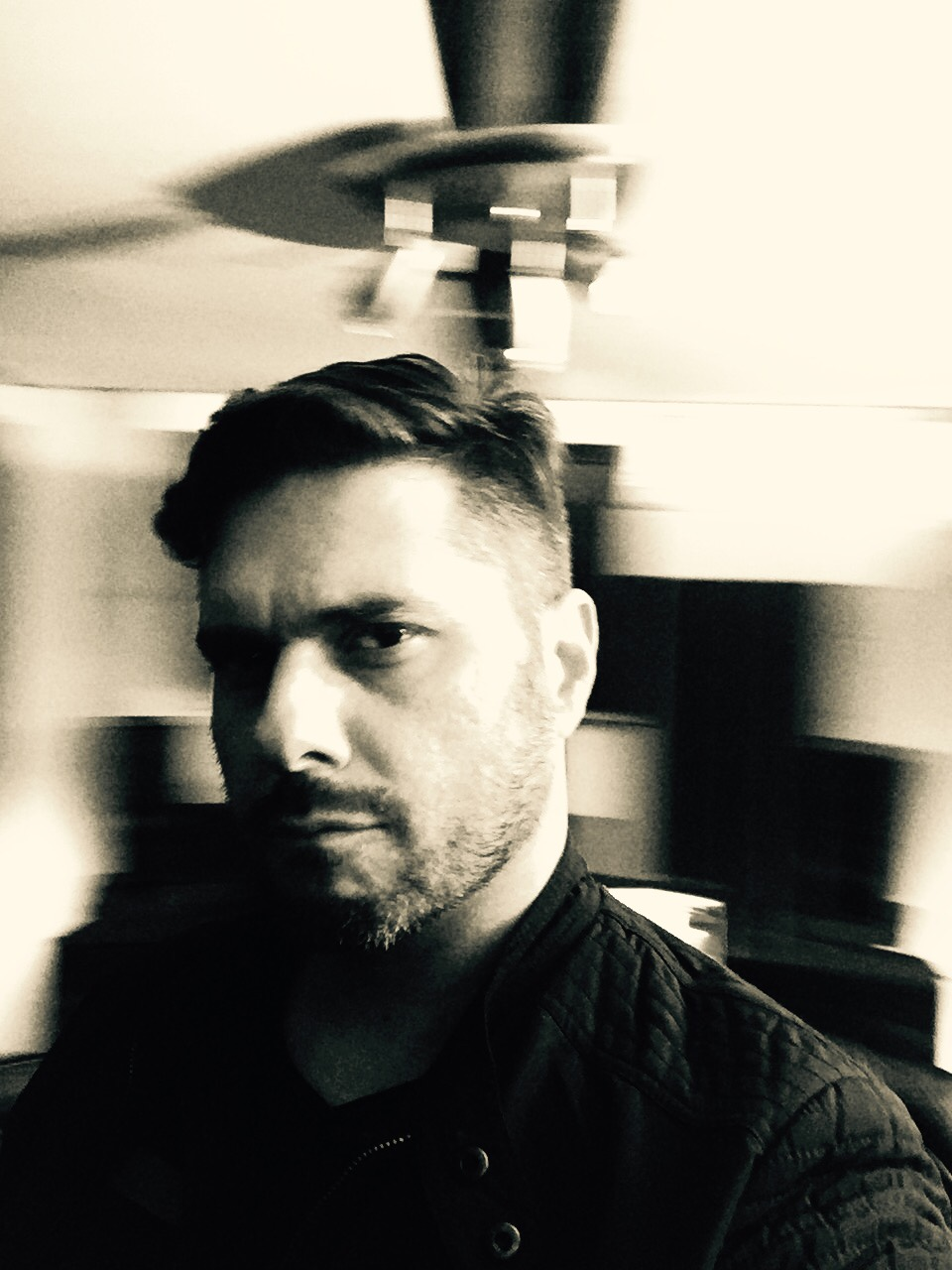

Background information
- Born: Ofer Dikovsky; 10 December 1971 (age 54); Tel-Aviv, Israel
- Genres: Electronic music, house, trance, goa, electronic rock, lounge & chill
- Occupations: Musician, artist, musical producer
- Years active: 1994–present
- Labels: BNE, NMC, Dragonfly Records, Phonokol, MDMA Music
- Website: www.facebook.com/oforia.music

Ofer Dikovsky (Hebrew: עופר דיקובסקי), better known by his stage name Oforia (in Hebrew: אופוריה), is a music producer and DJ from Israel. Besides having a solo career as Oforia or Noor, he has been involved with various musical groups/formations such as Indoor, Tandu and OB1, and has worked on several musical projects such as Pigs in Space and Phreaky.

== Biography ==
Ofer Dikovsky was a member of the famous Goa-trance band Indoor with Avi Algarnati and Marko Goren. Their 1995 album, Progressive Trance, was one of the first in the wave of trance-artist albums. After the group disbanded, he continued to work with Marco Goren. Together, they formed the band Tandu, which made its mark with Ofer's solo track "Alien Pump". Working once more with Indoor, along with DJ Dino Psaras on the "Phreaky" project, Ofer helped create the 1997 hit "Tornado" which charted at No. 23 in the UK Indie Charts.

Subsequently, Ofer began working as a solo artist under various names. He started as Oforia, and became one of the first Israeli artists to be signed to a UK label (Dragonfly). The result was his 1998 debut album Delirious. The album established Ofer's unique sound and brought him international fame.

Simultaneously, Dikovsky ran two other side projects. One project was with Solaris and culminated in the single "Out There" / "Extra Mundane," a 12" release that was featured in many compilations. The other project was a full-length concept album, Pigs in Space, released in 1998.

In 1999, Oforia released his second solo studio Off The Ground, featuring various styles of trance: psychedelic, progressive, ambient, and industrial. The album was considered pioneering, and "ahead of its time". The next Oforia album was Let It Beat, which circulated on the psytrance scene in 2002. Headed for Infinity was promoted with 12"-vinyl single release, and was two remixes from G.M.S. and Violet Vision of "Northern Lights".

His next album, released in 2006 under the title Inner Twist, was considered one of his best musical outputs and contains tracks "Spiders," "Inner Twist," "Adrenaline," "Show No Mercy," and "Return of the Machines." The latter was an international hit made in collaboration with B-wicked.

Oforia has remixed many artists, including Infected Mushroom, GMS, Violet Vision, Atomic Pulse, Time Lock, Moshic, Fatali, and more. In 2007, he joined forces with B-wicked (real name Bertin Katz) to form a dance/rock project named OB1. Their first album, Dream Dictionary, was released on Sonicult Music and was followed by two further EP releases.

In 2010, after releasing his down-beat album Textures as Oforia, Dikovsky made a turn towards progressive/tech house and started producing and releasing under the brand Ofer Di.

In 2015, Dikovsky made a full comeback to the trance scene and released new psy-/Goa- trance music as Oforia, alongside his old-time Indoor collaborators, which included Avi Algranati (known, more recently, for "Space Cat"). He also revived, together with DJ Dede, the label MDMA Music, which releases all his latest music.

== Discography ==
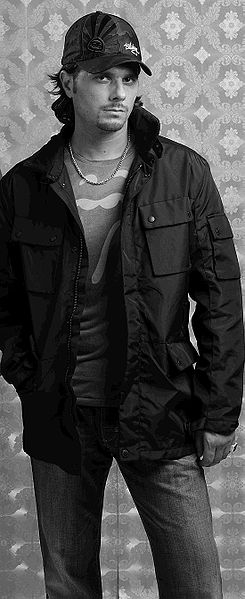

=== Albums ===
- 1995: Indoor – Progressive Trance
- 1997: Tandu – Multimoods
- 1998: Oforia – Delirious
- 1998: Oforia – Pigs in Space
- 1999: Oforia – Off The Ground
- 2002: Oforia – Let It Beat
- 2005: Oforia – Headed for Infinity
- 2006: Oforia – Inner Twist
- 2008: Oforia – Arcadia – The Remixes Album
- 2009: OB1 (Oforia & B-wicked) – Dream Dictionary
- 2009: Oforia – Textures
- 2016: Oforia – Read More

=== EP ===
- 2000: Oforia – Raw
- 2002: Oforia – Millions of Miles Away
- 2006: Oforia – Northern Lights
- 2008: Oforia – Return of the Machines
- 2009: OB1 – Behind the Wheel EP
- 2009: OB1 – Ride on EP
- 2009: Oforia - Exit

- 2010: Ofer Di - Feel
- 2010: Ofer Di - I Want
- 2010: Ofer Di - Get Up
- 2011: Ofer Di Ft Doreen - Leave again
- 2011: Ofer Di & Matan Caspi - On A Plane
- 2011: Ofer Di & Matan Caspi - Over Come
- 2011: Ofer Di Ft Doreen - Its All About You
- 2012: Ofer Di - Your Rhythm
- 2012: Ofer Di - Primal Instinct
- 2012: Sebastian Krieg, Weekend Heroes Ft. Ofer Di & Doreen - over The World

- 2015: Indoor - Mind Altering
- 2015: Oforia - Venus
- 2015: Oforia Ft Dede - The Looking glass of Alice

=== Compilations ===
- 2007: Oforia – CyberDog Vol 4 Psi-Fi Systems Mixed by Oforia
