= Daniel Koren =

Israeli musician, comedian and director (born 1984)

- דניאל קורן
- Born: January 23, 1984 (age 42); Rishon Lezion, Israel
- Occupations: Musician, comedian, director
- Years active: 2002–present

Daniel Koren (Hebrew: דניאל קורן; born January 23, 1984) is an Israeli musician, comedian and director. Koren was born in Rishon LeZion, Israel on January 23, 1984.

== Early life ==
Koren grew up in Rishon Lezion, where he started taking classical-piano lessons with Mira Broslavsky when he was 3 years old. His first public appearance was in 1997 when he played Keyboard in Arutz HaYeladim (Israeli Kid's Cable Television Channel). In 2002 Daniel started working with music producer Yoni Bloch, taking a part in his productions as a pianist and an orchestrator. During that time Koren began touring and recording with singer songwriter Efrat Gosh. In 2006 Koren moved to the US for composition in Berklee College of music, Boston and graduated cum laude two years later. Upon graduation Koren moved to NYC and began working as a staff pianist in Juilliard, NYU, Ballet Hispanico, and 92nd Street Y, accompanying and composing for dance companies and classes.

== Career ==
In 2009 Koren started working on the PBS Kids web-series "Fizzy's Lunch Lab" as a musician, composing the show's Main Theme as well as the score. For his work on "Fizzy's Lunch Lab" Koren was also nominated for an Emmy (2012). In 2011 his studio album "Hi Nofelet Bekeilo", (She's Not Really Falling) was published in by NMC Music, and was well received by the critics: Music critic Shay Lahav at Ynet wrote : "If this is not a contribution to the Israeli sound, than what is?"; MusicaNeto wrote:"Koren keeps surprising and challenging the listener". Koren composed, written and orchestrated all the songs in the album and collaborated with lyricist Barak Feldman, who wrote one song. In the same year Koren also formed the Koren Ensemble (F.K.A Koren Ansambel) together with Vibraphonist Claudio Marquez, Guitarist Alon Albagli, Bassist David Segal, Trumpeter Brian Chahley and later on Drummer Or Zubalsky. They started performing in NY clubs, and independently released their first Studio Album "Declaration Of Intent". Thanks to their unique mix of music and comedy, The Koren Ensemble gained excessive popularity and passed over millions of views on their YouTube account. In 2011 received a Gold Record Sales Certification for his orchestration work for singer-songwriter Avraham Tal. In 2012 Koren directed a video for Shell Corp called "Sounds of Energy", an interactive video experience where the user creates different mixes using a range of every day energy-related objects. The project, which based on Edvard Grieg's In The Hall of the Mountain King, earned millions of views worldwide and was presented in Cannes Lions International Festival of Creativity. Koren recorded his second Israeli studio-album, 'Ze Keleve O' Chatul' (it's a dog or a cat) in 2013.

== Video & Floating Heads ==
In 2011 Daniel Koren developed a music-video format consists of duplicated, "neckless" heads over a black background, making comical A Capella arrangements for known tunes as well as original compositions. The videos have gained hundreds of thousands of views and appeared on Comedy Central's Tosh.0 blog, and Smosh Pit Weekly. Continuing the project's success, two years later Koren made a live, staged version of the Floating Heads, combining video, comedy and live music.

== Discography ==
- Declaration Of Intent (2011)
- Hi Nofelet Bekeilo היא נופלת בכאילו (she's not really falling) (2011)

- The album contains the singles "Hamula Shel Dubim", 'חמולה של דובים' ("a clan of bears"), "Romantika", 'רומנטיקה' ("Romance").

- The Week (2013)
- So[ng]lilquy [E.P.] (2013)
- Ze Kelev O Chatul זה כלב או חתול (it's a dog or a cat) (2013)

- The album contains the singles "Tirkedi Achsav", 'תרקדי עכשיו' ("Dance Now!"), "Sfina Al Yam", 'ספינה על ים' ("A Ship on the Ocean").

- בין האיילות (Between the deers) (2019)
- Thought diary (2020)

- the album contains the single "I Miss Fomo".

== Personal life ==
Koren practices meditation, studies and teaches Tibetan Buddhism.
