= Harvard Board of Overseers =

Governing board of Harvard University

The Harvard Board of Overseers (more formally The Honorable and Reverend the Board of Overseers) is an advisory board of alumni at Harvard University. Unlike the Harvard Corporation, the Board of Overseers is not a fiduciary governing board, but instead "has the power of consent to certain actions of the Corporation." Formed in 1642, the Board of Overseers predates the Corporation's 1650 incorporation.

== Overview and function ==
The board is composed of more than 30 overseers, all directly elected by alumni. The treasurer and the president of Harvard University are included as ex officio members of the board.

Each year, Harvard alumni elect five new overseers to serve six-year terms. Most overseer candidates are nominated by the Harvard Alumni Association (HAA); those not nominated by the HAA must gather signatures from Harvard alumni to appear on the ballot as petition candidates. The number of signatures required in these cases is one percent of the number of eligible voters in the prior year's election.

According to the Harvard website, the Board of Overseers complements the work of the President and Fellows of Harvard College:

[T]he Board exerts broad influence over the University’s strategic directions, provides counsel to the University leadership on priorities and plans, and has the power of consent to certain actions of the Corporation. The Board’s chief functions include superintendence of the visitation process, the principal mechanism for periodic external review of the quality and direction of the University’s schools, departments, and selected other programs and activities. The Board carries out this responsibility largely through the operation of more than fifty visiting committees, whose work is overseen by and reported to the Board.

Another of its functions is to approve candidates selected for membership to the Harvard Corporation.

== History ==
Originally the overseers were self-perpetuating, and included, ex officio, the public officials and Puritan clergy of Cambridge and the neighboring towns, hence the "honorable and reverend" of the title. From 1851 to 1865, the fellows were appointed by the Massachusetts Legislature.

Ambassador Joseph P. Kennedy Sr. quipped famously of the election of John F. Kennedy, his son, to the board in 1957: "Now I know his religion won't keep him out of the White House. If an Irish Catholic can get elected as an Overseer at Harvard, he can get elected to anything."

=== Petition candidates ===
In the late 1980s, a group calling for a withdrawal of Harvard's investments in apartheid South Africa helped nominate petition candidates for overseer elections. Known as the Harvard-Radcliffe Alumni Against Apartheid (HRAAA), this group supported the first petition candidate to win an overseer's seat. The HRAAA backed South African Archbishop Desmond Tutu in his successful bid to join the board in 1989, and future U.S. president Barack Obama's unsuccessful petition bid in 1991.

In 2020, Harvard Forward, an alumni NPO calling for increased attention to climate change, including fossil fuel divestment, and representation of younger alumni on the Board, put forward a slate of five petition candidates. Three of the five were elected to the board: environmental scientist Jayson Toweh, civil rights attorney Thea Sebastian, and professional soccer player Margaret Purce, despite HAA leaders circulation of a letter calling climate concerns "special interests", and suggesting that it was inappropriate for overseers candidates to state their views on university issues. Following the election of the three Harvard Forward candidates, the Board of Overseers and the Harvard Corporation changed the election rules in order to make it harder for petition candidates to be elected.

== Board members ==
As of June 2025, the Harvard Board of Overseers members are:

- Modupe Akinola (2024–2030), Zalaznick Professor of Business and Faculty Director of the Bernstein Center for Leadership and Ethics, Columbia Business School
- Nworah Blaise Ayogu (2024–2030), Head of Healthcare Impact, Thrive Capital
- Monica Bharel (2022–2026), Public Health and Healthcare Strategist, former Commissioner of the Massachusetts Department of Public Health
- Raphael Bostic (2020–2026), president and CEO of Federal Reserve Bank of Atlanta
- Sylvia Mathews Burwell* (2023–2029), 15th President of American University
- Theodore D. Chuang (2024–2030), Judge, U.S. District Court for the District of Maryland
- Sangu J. Delle (2022–2028), CEO, CarePoint
- Jeffrey D. Dunn (2023–2029), former interim president and CEO of the Boston Symphony Orchestra
- Mark A. Edwards (2025–2031), Co-founder and CEO, Upstream USA; founder and former executive director, Opportunity Nation
- Danielle Feinberg (2024–2030), Cinematographer; visual effects supervisor at Pixar Animation Studios
- Fiona Hill (2023–2029), Chancellor of Durham University
- Christopher B. Howard (2021–2027), Executive VP and COO of Arizona State University Public Enterprise
- Mary Louise Kelly (2025–2031), Journalist and broadcaster, co-host of All Things Considered on NPR
- Nathaniel Owen Keohane (2025–2031), President of Center for Climate and Energy Solutions
- Vanessa W. Liu (2023–2029), Founder and CEO of Sugarwork
- Raymond Lohier (2021–2027), Judge, U.S. Court of Appeals for the Second Circuit
- Lauren Ancel Meyers (2022–2028), Professor, Departments of Integrative Biology, Statistics & Data Sciences, Population Health, University of Texas at Austin
- Todd Y. Park (2022–2028), Co-Founder and Executive Chairman, Devoted Health
- Margaret Purce (2020–2026), Soccer player, United States women's national soccer team and Gotham FC
- Michael Rosenblatt (2025–2031), Advisory partner at Ascenta Capital; senior adviser at Bain Capital Life Sciences and Flagship Pioneering; former executive vice president and chief medical officer at Merck & Co.; former dean, Tufts University School of Medicine
- Robert L. Satcher (2023–2029), Associate professor of orthopedic oncology at the University of Texas M.D. Anderson Cancer Center
- Thea Sebastian (2020–2026), Policy Counsel for Civil Rights Corps
- Juan Antonio Sepúlveda Jr. (2024–2030), Calgaard Distinguished Professor of Practice in Political Science and President’s Special Adviser for Inclusive Excellence, Trinity University
- Anjali Sud (2025–2027), CEO of Tubi; former CEO of Vimeo
- Vikas P. Sukhatme (2022–2028), Robert W. Woodruff Professor of Medicine and Dean, Emory School of Medicine Chief Academic Officer, Emory Healthcare
- Megan Red Shirt-Shaw (2021–2027), Director of Native Student Services, University of South Dakota
- Jayson Toweh (2020–2026), Doctoral Student and Researcher, Emmett Interdisciplinary Program in Environment and Resources, Stanford University
- Wilhelmina Wright (2022–2028), Senior U.S. District Court judge, U.S. District Court for the District of Minnesota
- Courtney B. Vance (2025-2031), Actor, producer, writer; president and chair of SAG-AFTRA Foundation
- Sheryl WuDunn (2021–2027), Journalist and author; co-Founder of FullSky Partners
- Alan Garber, President, Harvard University (ex officio)
- Timothy R. Barakett, Treasurer, Harvard University (ex officio)

*Denotes president of the board
