= Michael Jeter =

American actor (1952–2003)

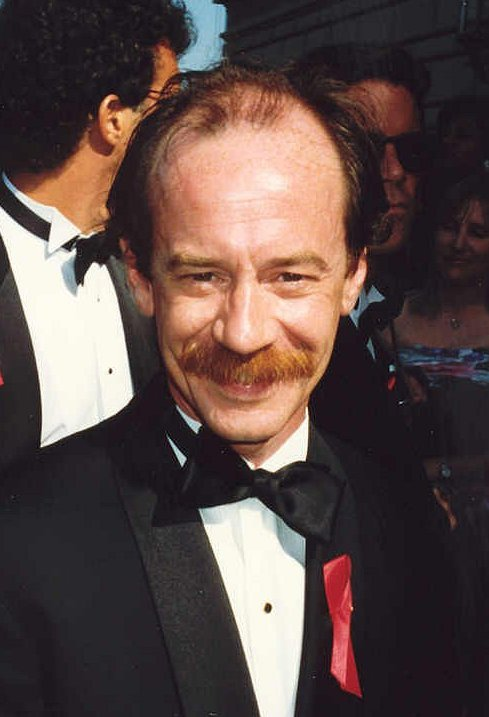
- Jeter at the 44th Emmy Awards in 1992
- Born: August 26, 1952; Lawrenceburg, Tennessee, U.S.
- Died: March 30, 2003 (aged 50); Los Angeles, California, U.S.
- Education: Memphis State University
- Occupation: Actor
- Years active: 1977–2003
- Partner: Sean Blue (1995–2003)

Michael Jeter (/ˈdʒiːtər/; August 26, 1952 – March 30, 2003) was an American actor. Known for his career on stage and screen, Jeter played diverse characters. He won a Tony Award and a Primetime Emmy Award. He portrayed Herman Stiles on the sitcom Evening Shade from 1990 until 1994.

Jeter was born in Lawrenceburg, Tennessee. He studied at Memphis State University and later pursued a career in acting. He made his Broadway debut acting in the musical Once in a Lifetime (1979), followed by G. R. Point. For his role as Otto Kringelein in the musical Grand Hotel (1989) he received a Tony Award for Best Featured Actor in a Musical. Jeter also portrayed Giuseppe Zangara in the musical Assassins (1989).

Jeter gained fame for his roles in The Fisher King (1991) and The Green Mile (1999). His other notable film roles include in Zelig (1983), Miller's Crossing (1990), Sister Act 2: Back in the Habit (1993), Air Bud (1997), Mouse Hunt (1997), Patch Adams (1998), Jurassic Park III (2001), Open Range (2003), and The Polar Express (2004). He also appeared on Sesame Street's Elmo's World as the other Mister Noodle from 2000 to 2003.

== Early life and education ==
Jeter was born in Lawrenceburg, Tennessee, on August 26, 1952. His mother, Virginia (née Raines), was a housewife. His father, William Claud Jeter, was a dentist. Jeter had one brother and four sisters. Jeter was a student at Memphis State University (now the University of Memphis) when his interests changed from medicine to acting. He performed in several plays and musicals at the Circuit Theatre and its partner theatre, the Playhouse on the Square, in midtown Memphis. He left Memphis to further pursue his stage career in Baltimore, Maryland.

== Career ==
Jeter's extreme flexibility and high energy led Tommy Tune to cast him in the off-Broadway play Cloud 9 in 1981. He received acclaim for his role in the Broadway musical Grand Hotel, for which he won a Tony Award. He subsequently starred in the CBS sitcom Evening Shade, winning a Primetime Emmy Award for his performance. Much of his work specialised in playing eccentric, pretentious, or wimpy characters, as in The Fisher King, Waterworld, Fear and Loathing in Las Vegas, The Green Mile and Drop Zone. In The Fisher King, Jeter portrayed "an unnamed homeless cabaret singer", and "shimmies across the screen with boundless confidence, turning what might have been a grotesque, or at least merely humorous, part into something noble, even indomitable... In a film unafraid of big acting, Jeter goes bigger than anyone." Occasionally, Jeter was able to stray from type for more diverse characters, such as those he portrayed in Jurassic Park III, Air Bud, and Open Range. Jeter is perhaps most known for his role as convicted felon Eduard Delacroix in The Green Mile, a role for which he was nominated along with the rest of the cast for a Screen Actors Guild Award.

He also played Mr. Noodle's brother, Mister Noodle, on Sesame Street from 2000 to 2003. He appeared in an episode of Touched by an Angel in 1999 as Gus, an insurance salesman who arrives in Las Vegas, in the episode "The Man Upstairs". His last two appearances were in the films Open Range and The Polar Express. Both films were in post-production at the time of his death and, when released, contained a dedication to his memory. The season 35 premiere of Sesame Street, a special entitled "The Street We Live On", was similarly dedicated to Jeter.

== Personal life and death ==
Jeter was gay and was in a relationship with his partner, Sean Blue, from 1995 until Jeter's death in 2003.

He was HIV-positive and publicly disclosed his diagnosis in a 1997 interview on Entertainment Tonight. Despite this, he remained healthy for many years. While accepting his 1990 Tony Award, Jeter also announced that he was in recovery from substance abuse.

On March 30, 2003, Blue found Jeter dead at his home in Hollywood Hills, California; he was 50 years old. According to Blue, the cause of death was complications following an epileptic seizure. Jeter was cremated, and his ashes were given to Blue.

== Acting credits ==
=== Film ===
Year	Title	Role	Notes
1979	Hair	Woodrow Sheldon	
1981	Ragtime	Special Reporter	
1982	Soup for One	Mr. Kelp	
1983	Zelig	Freshman No. 2	
1986	The Money Pit	Arnie	
1989	Dead Bang	Dr. Alexander Krantz	
1989	Tango & Cash	Floyd Skinner	
1990	Just Like in the Movies	Vernon	
1990	Miller's Crossing	Adolph	
1991	The Fisher King	Homeless Cabaret Singer	
1993	Bank Robber	Night Clerk No. 1	
1993	Sister Act 2: Back in the Habit	Father Ignatius	
1994	Drop Zone	Earl Leedy	
1995	Waterworld	Gregor	
1997	Air Bud	Norm Snively	
1997	Mouse Hunt	Quincy Thorpe	
1998	Fear and Loathing in Las Vegas	Dr. L. Ron Bumquist	
1998	The Naked Man	'Sticks' Varona	
1998	Thursday	Dr. Jarvis	
1998	Zack and Reba	Oras	
1998	Patch Adams	Rudy	
1999	True Crime	Dale Porterhouse	
1999	Jakob the Liar	Avron	
1999	The Green Mile	Eduard Delacroix	
2000	South of Heaven, West of Hell	Uncle Jude	
2000	The Gift	Gerald Weems	
2001	Jurassic Park III	Udesky	
2002	Welcome to Collinwood	'Toto'	
2003	Open Range	Percy	Posthumous release; dedicated to his memory
2004	The Polar Express	Smokey / Steamer	Voice; posthumous release; final film role; dedicated to his memory

=== Television ===
Year	Title	Role	Notes
1979	My Old Man	George Gardner	Television film
1980	Another World	Arnie Gallo	Unknown episodes
1980	From Here to Eternity	Private Ridgley	Unknown episodes
1980	Lou Grant	Max Galt	Episode: "Dogs"
1981	Alice at the Palace	Caterpillar / Dormouse	Television film
1986	Night Court	Confessing Crook	Episode: "The Night Off"
1987	Designing Women	Calvin Klein	Episode: "Old Spouses Never Die – Part 1"
1988	Crime Story	Senator Michael Gaspari	Episode: "The Hearings"
1988	Hothouse	Dr. Art Makter	7 episodes
1990–1994	Evening Shade	Herman Stiles	98 episodes
1993–1995	Picket Fences	Peter Lebeck	3 episodes
1993	Tales of the City	Carson Callas	3 episodes
1993	Gypsy	Goldstone	Television film
1994	Aladdin	Runtar	Voice; Episode: "StinkerBelle"
1995	Chicago Hope	Bob Ryan	Episode: "A Coupla Stiffs"
1996	Dream On	Dr. Enoch	Episode: "Finale with a Vengeance"
1996	Suddenly Susan	Lawrence Rosewood	Episode: "Dr. No"
1996	Mrs. Santa Claus	Arvo	Television film
1996	The Boys Next Door	Arnold Wiggins	Television film
1997	Duckman	Dr. William Blay	Voice; episode: "Ajax & Ajaxer"
1997	Second Noah	The Chicken Man	Episode: "Diving In"
1997	Murphy Brown	Vic	Episode: "You Don't Know Jackal"
1997	Johnny Bravo	Lawrence the Camel	Voice; episode: "Over the Hump"
1998–1999	The Wild Thornberrys	Biederman	Voice; 4 episodes
1998	Veronica's Closet	Edwin Murloff	Episode: "Veronica's Blackout"
1998	The Ransom of Red Chief	Bill Driscoll	Television film
1999	Touched by an Angel	Gus Zimmerman	Episode: "The Man Upstairs"
2000–2003	Sesame Street	Mr. Noodle's Brother, Mister Noodle	Elmo's World segments
2002	Taken	William Jeffries	Episode: "Taken"
2002	Hey Arnold!	Nate Horowitz	Voice; episode: "Gerald's Game/The Fishing Trip"

=== Theater ===
Year	Title	Role	Notes
1978	Once in a Lifetime	Jolson / Bellboy	Circle in the Square
1979	G.R. Point	Straw	Playhouse Theatre, Broadway
1980	Alice in Concert	Ensemble	The Public Theater
1981	Cloud 9	Betty / Gerry	Lucille Lortel's Theatre de Lys
1982	Greater Tuna	Performer	Circle in the Square Downtown
1989	Grand Hotel	Otto Kringelein	Martin Beck Theatre, Broadway
1989	Assassins	Giuseppe Zangara	Playwrights Horizons

== Awards and nominations ==
Year	Association	Category	Project	Result	Ref.
1979	Theatre World Award		G.R. Point	Won	
1990	Tony Award	Best Featured Actor in a Musical	Grand Hotel	Won	
1990	Drama Desk Award	Outstanding Featured Actor in a Musical	Grand Hotel	Won	
1990	Outer Critics Circle Award	Outstanding Actor in a Musical	Grand Hotel	Won	
1990	Clarence Derwent Prize		Grand Hotel	Won	
1991	Primetime Emmy Award	Outstanding Supporting Actor in a Comedy Series	Evening Shade	Nominated	
1992	Primetime Emmy Award	Outstanding Supporting Actor in a Comedy Series	Evening Shade	Won	
1992	Golden Globe Award	Best Actor in a Supporting Role – Television	Evening Shade	Nominated	
1993	Primetime Emmy Award	Outstanding Supporting Actor in a Comedy Series	Evening Shade	Nominated	
1993	Primetime Emmy Award	Outstanding Guest Actor in a Drama Series	Picket Fences	Nominated	
1995	Primetime Emmy Award	Outstanding Guest Actor in a Drama Series	Chicago Hope	Nominated	
1999	Screen Actors Guild Award	Outstanding Ensemble in a Motion Picture	The Green Mile	Nominated	
