= Mel Ming =

- Born: Hilton Austin Melvin Ming; 1944 (age 81–82); Hamilton, Bermuda
- Education: Temple University (BBA)
- Occupation: Broadcast executive
- Children: 2

H. Melvin "Mel" Ming (born as Hilton Austin Melvin Ming) is a Bermudian-American broadcast executive who was the president and CEO of Sesame Workshop from 2011 until his retirement in 2014. He was previously chief operating officer of Sesame Workshop, and has held executive positions at the Museum of Television and Radio, WQED and NPR.

== Early life ==
Ming was born in Bermuda and attended Temple University (class of 1967) graduating with a B.B.A. in Accountancy. He later served in the U. S. Army during the Vietnam War.

== Career ==
Ming is a certified public accountant. He became the finance director of NPR in August 1983. In 1997, he became the vice president and treasurer at the Museum of Television and Radio (now Paley Center for Media) in New York, after having served as chief operating officer at WQED in Pittsburgh. He joined Sesame Workshop in 1999 as its chief financial officer, and became chief operating officer in 2002. He was named president and CEO in October 2011, replacing Gary Knell. He retired in 2014 and was succeeded by Jeffrey D. Dunn.

Ming is an independent director of Dial Global.

Business positions
Preceded by Gary Knell	President and CEO of Sesame Workshop; 2011-2014	Succeeded by Jeffrey D. Dunn
