= Jeffrey D. Dunn =

American CEO

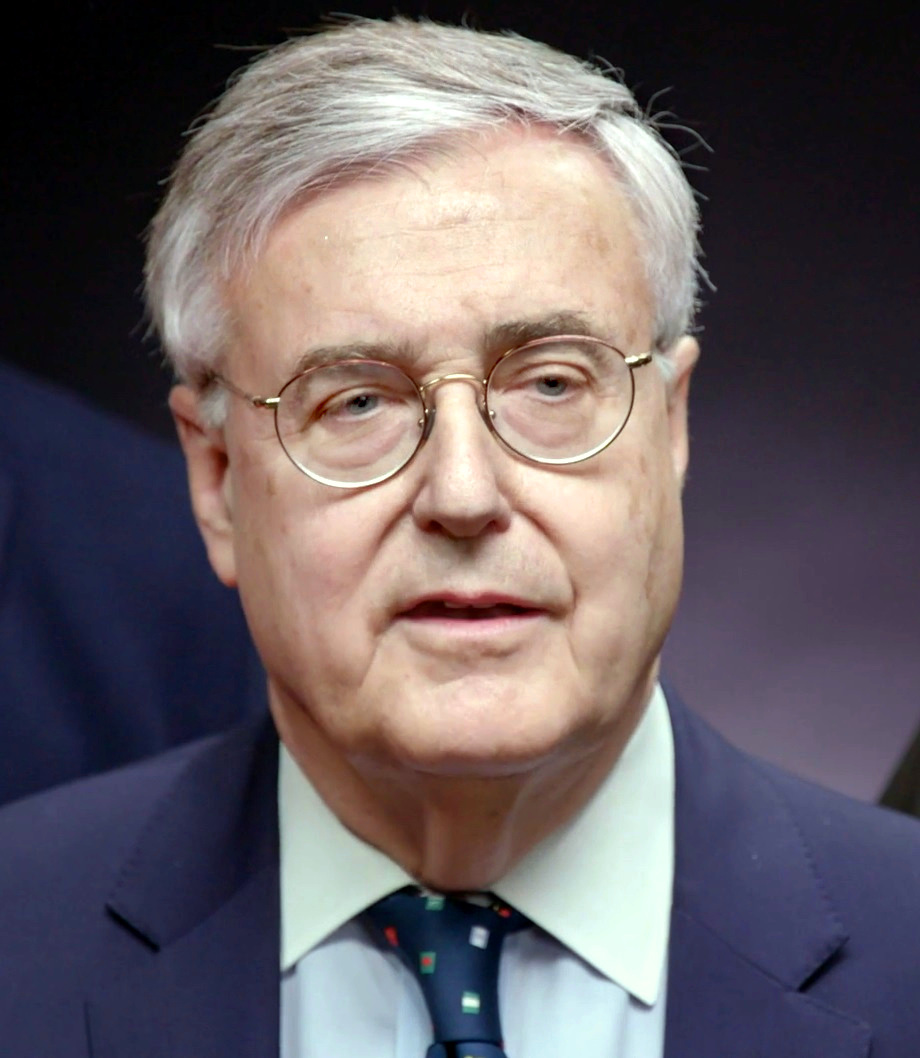
- Dunn in 2019
- Education: Harvard University
- Occupation: Broadcast executive
- Known for: Former president and CEO of Sesame Workshop; HiT Entertainment
- Board member of: Harvard Board of Overseers

Jeffrey D. Dunn is a retired American broadcast executive who was the president and CEO of Sesame Workshop until 2021, the non-profit organization best known for making Sesame Street. Previously, he was the president and CEO of the HiT Entertainment, from 2008 until it was sold to Mattel, in 2012.

Dunn was elected to a six-year term on the Harvard Board of Overseers in 2023. He was a Fellow at the Harvard University Advanced Leadership Initiative in 2014. He was also appointed to the AARP board in 2021.

Prior to leading HiT, he was the COO of Nickelodeon and the President of Nickelodeon Film and Enterprises. Prior to joining Nickelodeon, where he spent 13 years, Dunn was in charge of marketing for The Bank of Boston. His career began at Time Magazine, where he held a variety of marketing and general management positions.

== Early life ==
Dunn was raised in West Hartford, Connecticut, where he graduated magna cum laude from the Kingswood School in 1973. During his senior year of high school, Dunn served as the Editorial Supervisor for The Kingswood News and interned at the Hartford Courant, where he wrote daily obituaries. He received his AB degree cum laude from Harvard College in 1977, where he majored in American political history, and he received his MBA degree in 1981 from the Harvard Graduate School of Business Administration, where he was named by the faculty to the Century Club as one of the top leaders of his class.

== Personal life ==
Dunn has two sons with Karen, whom he has been married to since circa 1982.

Business positions
| Preceded by Mel Ming | President and CEO of Sesame Workshop; 2014-2021 | Succeeded by Steve Youngwood (CEO) Sherrie Westin (President) |
