= Steve Youngwood =

American media executive

- Education: Yale University (BA); Stanford Graduate School of Business (MBA)
- Occupation: Media executive
- Known for: Chief executive officer of Sesame Workshop (2021–2024)

Stephen "Steve" Youngwood is an American media executive. He served as the chief executive officer (CEO) of Sesame Workshop, the nonprofit organization behind Sesame Street, from 2021 to 2024. Earlier in his career he was a senior digital-media executive at Nickelodeon.

== Early life and education ==
Youngwood graduated from Yale University, where he majored in history, and earned a Master of Business Administration from the Stanford Graduate School of Business. He began his career as a consultant at McKinsey & Company, working in the United States and Germany.

== Career ==
=== Nickelodeon ===
Youngwood spent much of his early career at Nickelodeon, a unit of Viacom, where he rose to executive vice president and general manager of the network's digital media and entertainment products, overseeing Nickelodeon's websites, mobile, gaming and other digital businesses.

=== Sesame Workshop ===
Youngwood joined Sesame Workshop in 2015 and served as its chief operating officer and, later, president of media and education. In October 2020, the organization announced that he would become CEO on January 1, 2021, succeeding the retiring Jeffrey D. Dunn; Sherrie Westin was named president at the same time.

Youngwood stepped down as CEO in February 2024. Westin was appointed interim CEO and, in July 2024, was named the organization's permanent CEO.
