= Efrat Gosh =

Israeli singer-songwriter

Efrat Gosh אפרת גוש
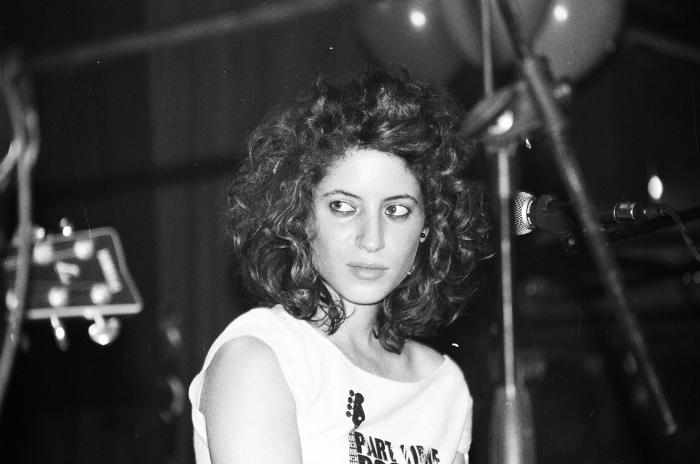

Background information
- Birth name: Efrat Gosh
- Born: November 3, 1983 (age 41)
- Origin: Herzliya, Israel
- Genres: Pop, chamber pop, rock
- Years active: 2004–present
- Labels: NMC
- Website: efratgosh.co.il

Efrat Gosh (Hebrew: אפרת גוש; born 3 November 1983) is an Israeli singer-songwriter.

== Biography ==
Efrat Gosh was born in Herzliya. She studied in the music department of Alon high school in Ramat Hasharon. She continued her education at the Rimon School of Jazz and Contemporary Music, focusing on Jazz. She cites Billie Holiday, Edith Piaf, Louis Armstrong and Charlie Parker as musical influences.

== Music career ==
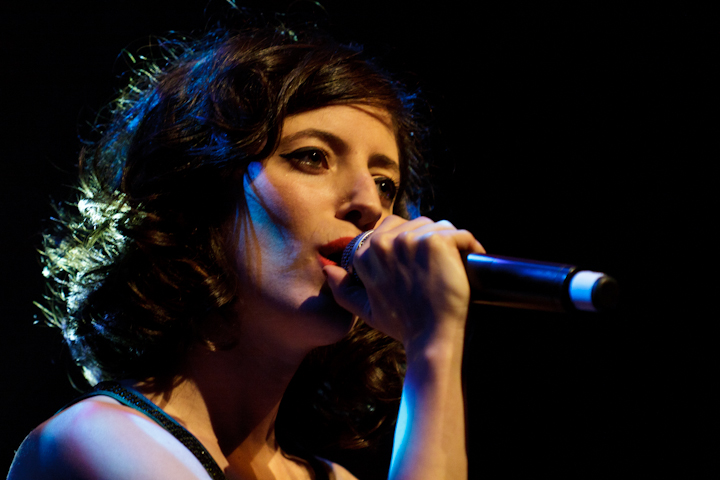
Efrat Gosh, 2011

Gosh's music career began when she recorded a demo with Yoni Bloch of a song written for Nurit Galron. A week later, she was asked to sing backing vocals in Bloch's shows. The head of the Hebrew Department of the Israeli music label NMC at the time, Chaim Shemesh, was in the audience and signed a contract with her.

In 2009, Gosh was the voice of Zoe Drake in the Anime Series Dinosaur King and Foofa in Yo Gabba Gabba!. She also dubbed Once Upon a Time... Planet Earth.

== Discography ==
- 2005 Efrat Gosh «Efrat Gosh» (Hebrew: אפרת גוש)
- 2007 The Forgiveness and me «Ha-slicha ve-ani» (Hebrew: הסליחה ואני)
- 2010 Ah ah ah love «Ah ah ah ahava» (Hebrew: אה אה אה אהבה)

== See also ==
- Music in Israel
