= Barak Feldman =

Israeli songwriter

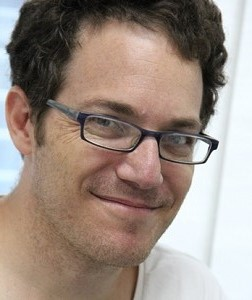
Barak Feldman

Barak Feldman (Hebrew: ברק פלדמן; born July 27, 1972) is an Israeli songwriter, known especially for his collaboration with Yoni Bloch and Efrat Gosh.

== Biography ==
Barak Feldman grew up in Omer. He began writing songs at the age of ten.

== Music career ==
Feldman posted his songs in "Bama Hadasha", a website that gives Israeli writers a platform for their lyrics. Via Bama Hadsha, Feldman met Yoni Bloch. One of the first songs the pair produced together was "Makir Oto" (Hebrew: מכיר אותו, English translation: Know Him), that Feldman initially wrote as a short story.

Feldman wrote most of the songs Bloch's first album, "Ulay Ze Ani" (Hebrew: אולי זה אני, English translation: Maybe it's Me) that was released in 2004. Part of them are "Hetkef Lev Katan" (Hebrew: התקף לב קטן, English translation: Little Heart Attack), "Ha'psichologit" (Hebrew: הפסיכולוגית, English translation: The Psychologist), "Makir Oto" and Tapuzim (Hebrew: "תפוזים", English translation: Oranges). Most of these songs were published prior the album's release, with different arrangements, at "Bama Hadasha" website.

Yoni and Barak later met the singer Efrat Gosh and created an album for her. Except for one song, Feldman wrote all the album's songs, and Bloch wrote all the melodies. Among them "Always when you come" (Hebrew: תמיד כשאתה בא), "Diet," "Good Alone," "Georgia" and more.

On Bloch's second album, "Bad Habits" which was published in 2007, Feldman was the primary author, including writing the songs: "responsibility", "different views" and "A reason to leave. In the same year Efrat Gosh published her second album, "Forgiveness and I", which Feldman wrote several songs, including "see the light" which become her most famous song. Cooperation between Feldman and Bloch continued in Bloch's third album, "Who am I kidding," published in 2008. Barak wrote many of the lyrics as well as scripts for many of the music videos.

Barak wrote number of other artists songs, most of Bloch's melodies. Among other things, he wrote the opening songs of the TV shows: "Michaela" ("Fly"), "Our Song" ("Soon"), "pajamas" ("pajama party" with Ilan Rosenfeld), "Pick Up "("Far Away"),"Danny Hollywood"(" Everything you dreamed of") and for "On the fingertips" ("I do not know"). Feldman also wrote the song for Bloch tune "After All" from the album of Ninet Tayeb "barefoot", and the title song of the fourth season of "Kokhav Nolad" (the Israeli version of "American Idol), "So many songs" Performed By Judah Sa'ado. For Adi Cohen's album "I need a man," he wrote the songs "Tell her about me" and "Who's the Most Beautiful" composed by Tamir Hitman. Other songs written by Feldman in collaboration with Yoni Bloch included "Happier time" by Boaz Meuda, "Feathers" by Miri Mesika "other place" Shlomi Saranga and more.

Barak wrote the songs for the plays "Peter Pan - The magic returns" for Orna Porat Theater and the Haifa Theater and the play "lone wolf" for Orna Porat Theater.

In 2009 he, Yoni Bloch and Tal Zubalsky founded the interactive media company Eko (formerly known as Interlude).

== See also ==
- Music of Israel
