= Yoni Bloch =

Israeli musician and entrepreneur

Yoni Bloch יוני בלוך
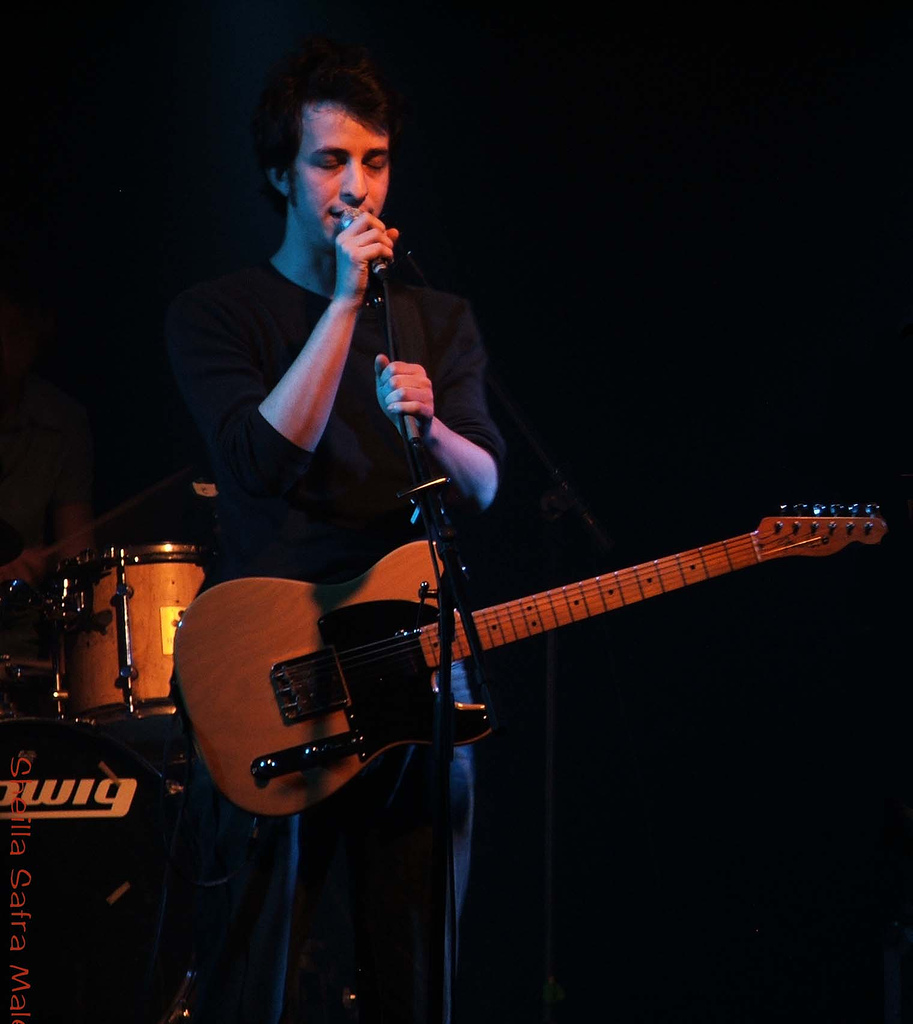
- Yoni Bloch, 2007

Background information
- Born: 11 August 1981 (age 45); Beersheba, Israel
- Origin: Lehavim, Israel
- Genre: Rock
- Occupations: Musician; Songwriter; Composer; Rock singer; Hi-tech entrepreneur
- Instruments: Piano; Guitar; Drums
- Years active: 2004–present
- Website: www.eko.com

Yoni Bloch (Hebrew: יוני בלוך; born August 11, 1981) is an Israeli singer, composer and entrepreneur. He is the co-founder and chief executive of the interactive video company Eko.

== Biography ==
Bloch grew up in Beersheba and at the age of 17 moved with his family to Lehavim. He started taking piano lessons when he was 6 years old, taught himself to play the guitar and the drums, and at 14 started to write songs and to compose music. He also learned how to write computer programs at an early age on a Commodore 64, a skill he'd later use with his bandmates when they created the technology for the interactive media startup and technology startup Eko.

His artistic journey started on the website Bama Hadasha ("New Stage"), which allows aspiring artists to publish their work in the fields of prose, poetry, plastic arts, music, etc. The daughter of the chairman of the record company NMC heard Bloch's songs on the site and introduced his music to her father. In a short while, Bloch's songs were heard in the radio.

== Music career ==
His first album Ulay Ze Ani ("Maybe It's Me") was released in 2004. Most of the songs were published earlier in the website Bama Hadasha. The musical style of the album is melodic rock, and the songs moved from rhythmical songs to calm and quiet ones. The songs were written in a humorous ambiance, which was expressed either in the lyrics or in the melody. Most of the songs were written by Barak Feldman and composed by Bloch.

Bloch also wrote songs for TV shows, TV realities and plays.

In June 2007 Bloch released his second album Hergelim Ra'im ("Bad Habits"). In this album there's his cover to the ballad "Annabel-Lee" written by Edgar Allan Poe, and was translated to Hebrew by Ze'ev Jabotinsky.

Bloch was a guest judge on the 5th season of the Israeli version of American Idol - "Kochav Nolad".

On November 19, 2008, Bloch released his third album Al Mi Ani Oved ("Who am I fooling"), and attached to it a movie that is made of clips to all the songs of the album. In the movie Bloch dies from a broken heart. The album was written after a hard break up of Bloch and his unknown girlfriend, in most of the songs at first there's a tranquil atmosphere and towards the end it becomes a rock song.

== Business career ==
In 2009 Bloch founded the interactive video company Interlude with Tal Zubalsky and Barak Feldman. The company developed technology for videos in which viewers choose how the story unfolds, and produced an interactive music video for Bob Dylan's "Like a Rolling Stone". Its investors have included Sequoia Capital, MGM, Warner Music Group and Samsung, and in 2016 Sony Pictures Entertainment made an investment that Bloch described as worth tens of millions of dollars.

In December 2016 Interlude renamed itself Eko, the name of its distribution platform. In October 2018 Walmart and Eko announced a joint venture, W*E Interactive Ventures, led by Bloch; Walmart was reported to be investing $250 million in it. Bloch is the company's chief executive.

== Discography ==
- Ulay Ze Ani, 'אולי זה אני' ( "Maybe It's Me" ) (2004)

- The album contains the single "Makir Oto", 'מכיר אותו' ("Know Him") among others.

- Hergelim Ra'im, 'הרגלים רעים' ( "Bad Habits" ) (2007)

- The album contains the singles "Achraiut", 'אחריות' ("Responsibility"), "Nof Acher", 'נוף אחר' ("Different View"), "Siba La'azov", 'סיבה לעזוב' ("Reason to Leave") and the title track.

- Al Mi Ani Oved, 'על מי אני עובד' ( "Who Am I Fooling?" ) (2008)

- The album contains the singles "Ahava Rechoka", 'אהבה רחוקה' ("Distant Love") and "Hakin'a" ("Jealousy").

== See also ==
- Music in Israel
- Eko (media production company)
