= NMC Music =

Israeli record label

- Founded: 1964 (as CBS Israel Records)
- Genre: Various
- Country of origin: Israel
- Official website: http://www.nmc-music.co.il/nmc/index_e.asp

NMC Music (Hebrew: אן אם סי) is an Israeli record label. It was established in 1964 as a subsidiary company of CBS, and became independent in 1988.

Artists represented by NMC include Noa Kirel, Mashina, Yehuda Poliker, Shlomi Shabat, Chava Alberstein, Ehud Banai, Meir Banai and T-Slam.

== Notable ==
- Gali Atari

== See also ==
- List of record labels
