= 2011 in the United States =

- Decades: 1990s; 2000s; 2010s; 2020s; 2030s
- See also: History of the United States (1991–2016); Timeline of United States history (2010–present); List of years in the United States

Events in the year 2011 in the United States.

== Incumbents ==
=== Federal government ===
- President: Barack Obama (D-Illinois)
- Vice President: Joe Biden (D-Delaware)
- Chief Justice of the Supreme Court: John Roberts (Maryland)
- Speaker of the House of Representatives:

Nancy Pelosi (D-California) (until January 3)
John Boehner (R-Ohio) (since January 5)

- Senate Majority Leader: Harry Reid (D-Nevada)
- Congress: 111th (until January 3), 112th (starting January 3)

==== State governments ====
Governors and lieutenant governors

=== Governors ===
- Governor of Alabama: Bob Riley (Republican) (until January 17), Robert J. Bentley (Republican) (starting January 17)
- Governor of Alaska: Sean Parnell (Republican)
- Governor of Arizona: Jan Brewer (Republican)
- Governor of Arkansas: Mike Beebe (Democratic)
- Governor of California: Arnold Schwarzenegger (Republican) (until January 3), Jerry Brown (Democratic) (starting January 3)
- Governor of Colorado: Bill Ritter (Democratic) (until January 11), John Hickenlooper (Democratic) (starting January 11)
- Governor of Connecticut: Jodi Rell (Republican) (until January 5), Dannel Malloy (Democratic) (starting January 5)
- Governor of Delaware: Jack Markell (Democratic)
- Governor of Florida: Charlie Crist (Republican)/(Independent) (until January 4), Rick Scott (Republican) (starting January 4)
- Governor of Georgia: Sonny Perdue (Republican) (until January 10), Nathan Deal (Republican) (starting January 10)
- Governor of Hawaii: Neil Abercrombie (Democratic)
- Governor of Idaho: Butch Otter (Republican)
- Governor of Illinois: Pat Quinn (Democratic)
- Governor of Indiana: Mitch Daniels (Republican)
- Governor of Iowa: Chet Culver (Democratic) (until January 14), Terry E. Branstad (Republican) (starting January 14)
- Governor of Kansas: Mark Parkinson (Democratic) (until January 10), Sam Brownback (Republican) (starting January 10)
- Governor of Kentucky: Steve Beshear (Democratic)
- Governor of Louisiana: Bobby Jindal (Republican)
- Governor of Maine: John Baldacci (Democratic) (until January 5), Paul LePage (Republican) (starting January 5)
- Governor of Maryland: Martin O'Malley (Democratic)
- Governor of Massachusetts: Deval Patrick (Democratic)
- Governor of Michigan: Jennifer Granholm (Democratic) (until January 1), Rick Snyder (Republican) (starting January 1)
- Governor of Minnesota: Tim Pawlenty (Republican) (until January 3), Mark Dayton (Democratic) (starting January 3)
- Governor of Mississippi: Haley Barbour (Republican)
- Governor of Missouri: Jay Nixon (Democratic)
- Governor of Montana: Brian Schweitzer (Democratic)
- Governor of Nebraska: Dave Heineman (Republican)
- Governor of Nevada: Jim Gibbons (Republican) (until January 3), Brian Sandoval (Republican) (starting January 3)
- Governor of New Hampshire: John Lynch (Democratic)
- Governor of New Jersey: Chris Christie (Republican)
- Governor of New Mexico: Bill Richardson (Democratic) (until January 1), Susana Martinez (Republican) (starting January 1)
- Governor of New York: Andrew Cuomo (Democratic) (starting January 1)
- Governor of North Carolina: Bev Perdue (Democratic)
- Governor of North Dakota: Jack Dalrymple (Republican)
- Governor of Ohio: Ted Strickland (Democratic) (until January 10), John Kasich (Republican) (starting January 10)
- Governor of Oklahoma: Brad Henry (Democratic) (until January 10), Mary Fallin (Republican) (starting January 10)
- Governor of Oregon: Ted Kulongoski (Democratic) (until January 10), John Kitzhaber (Democratic) (starting January 10)
- Governor of Pennsylvania: Ed Rendell (Democratic) (until January 18), Tom Corbett (Republican) (starting January 18)
- Governor of Rhode Island: Donald Carcieri (Republican) (until January 4), Lincoln Chafee (Independent)/(Democratic) (starting January 4)
- Governor of South Carolina: Mark Sanford (Republican) (until January 12), Nikki Haley (Republican) (starting January 12)
- Governor of South Dakota: Mike Rounds (Republican) (until January 8), Dennis Daugaard (Republican) (starting January 8)
- Governor of Tennessee: Phil Bredesen (Democratic) (until January 15), Bill Haslam (Republican) (starting January 15)
- Governor of Texas: Rick Perry (Republican)
- Governor of Utah: Gary Herbert (Republican)
- Governor of Vermont: Jim Douglas (Republican) (until January 6), Peter Shumlin (Democratic) (starting January 6)
- Governor of Virginia: Bob McDonnell (Republican)
- Governor of Washington: Christine Gregoire (Democratic)
- Governor of West Virginia: Earl Ray Tomblin (Democratic)
- Governor of Wisconsin: Jim Doyle (Democratic) (until January 3), Scott Walker (Republican) (starting January 3)
- Governor of Wyoming: Dave Freudenthal (Democratic) (until January 3), Matt Mead (Republican) (starting January 3)

=== Lieutenant governors ===
- Lieutenant Governor of Alabama: Jim Folsom Jr. (Democratic) (until January 17), Kay Ivey (Republican) (starting January 17)
- Lieutenant Governor of Alaska: Mead Treadwell (Republican)
- Lieutenant Governor of Arkansas: Bill Halter (Democratic) (until January 11), Mark Darr (Republican) (starting January 11)
- Lieutenant Governor of California: Abel Maldonado (Republican) (until January 10), Gavin Newsom (Democratic) (starting January 10)
- Lieutenant Governor of Colorado: Barbara O'Brien (Democratic) (until January 11), Joseph Garcia (Democratic) (starting January 11)
- Lieutenant Governor of Connecticut: Michael Fedele (Republican) (until January 5), Nancy Wyman (Democratic) (starting January 5)
- Lieutenant Governor of Delaware: Matthew Denn (Democratic)
- Lieutenant Governor of Florida: Jeff Kottkamp (Republican) (until January 4), Jennifer Carroll (Republican) (starting January 4)
- Lieutenant Governor of Georgia: Casey Cagle (Republican)
- Lieutenant Governor of Hawaii: Brian Schatz (Democratic)
- Lieutenant Governor of Idaho: Brad Little (Republican)
- Lieutenant Governor of Illinois: vacant (until January 10), Sheila Simon (Democratic) (starting January 10)
- Lieutenant Governor of Indiana: Becky Skillman (Republican)
- Lieutenant Governor of Iowa: Patty Judge (Democratic) (until January 14), Kim Reynolds (Republican) (starting January 14)
- Lieutenant Governor of Kansas: Troy Findley (Democratic) (until January 10), Jeff Colyer (Republican) (starting January 10)
- Lieutenant Governor of Kentucky: Daniel Mongiardo (Democratic) (until December 13), Jerry Abramson (Democratic) (starting December 13)
- Lieutenant Governor of Louisiana: Jay Dardenne (Republican)
- Lieutenant Governor of Maryland: Anthony Brown (Democratic)
- Lieutenant Governor of Massachusetts: Tim Murray (Democratic)
- Lieutenant Governor of Michigan: John D. Cherry (Democratic) (until January 1), Brian Calley (Republican) (starting January 1)
- Lieutenant Governor of Minnesota: Carol Molnau (Republican) (until January 3), Yvonne Prettner Solon (Democratic) (starting January 3)
- Lieutenant Governor of Mississippi: Phil Bryant (Republican)
- Lieutenant Governor of Missouri: Peter Kinder (Republican)
- Lieutenant Governor of Montana: John Bohlinger (Republican)
- Lieutenant Governor of Nebraska: Rick Sheehy (Republican)
- Lieutenant Governor of Nevada: Brian Krolicki (Republican)
- Lieutenant Governor of New Jersey: Kim Guadagno (Republican)
- Lieutenant Governor of New Mexico: Diane Denish (Democratic) (until January 1), John Sanchez (Republican) (starting January 1)
- Lieutenant Governor of New York: Robert Duffy (Democratic) (starting January 1)
- Lieutenant Governor of North Carolina: Walter Dalton (Democratic)
- Lieutenant Governor of North Dakota: Drew Wrigley (Republican)
- Lieutenant Governor of Ohio: Lee Fisher (Democratic) (until January 10), Mary Taylor (Republican) (starting January 10)
- Lieutenant Governor of Oklahoma: Jari Askins (Democratic) (until January 10), Todd Lamb (Republican) (starting January 10)
- Lieutenant Governor of Pennsylvania: Joseph B. Scarnati (Republican) (until January 18), Jim Cawley (Republican) (starting January 18)
- Lieutenant Governor of Rhode Island: Elizabeth H. Roberts (Democratic)
- Lieutenant Governor of South Carolina: André Bauer (Republican) (until January 12), Ken Ard (Republican) (starting January 12)
- Lieutenant Governor of South Dakota: Dennis Daugaard (Republican) (until January 8), Matt Michels (Republican) (starting January 8)
- Lieutenant Governor of Tennessee: Ron Ramsey (Republican)
- Lieutenant Governor of Texas: David Dewhurst (Republican)
- Lieutenant Governor of Utah: Greg Bell (Republican)
- Lieutenant Governor of Vermont: Brian Dubie (Republican) (until January 6), Phillip Scott (Republican) (starting January 6)
- Lieutenant Governor of Virginia: Bill Bolling (Republican)
- Lieutenant Governor of Washington: Brad Owen (Democratic)
- Lieutenant Governor of Wisconsin: Barbara Lawton (Democratic) (until January 3), Rebecca Kleefisch (Republican) (starting January 3)

== Events ==
=== January ===
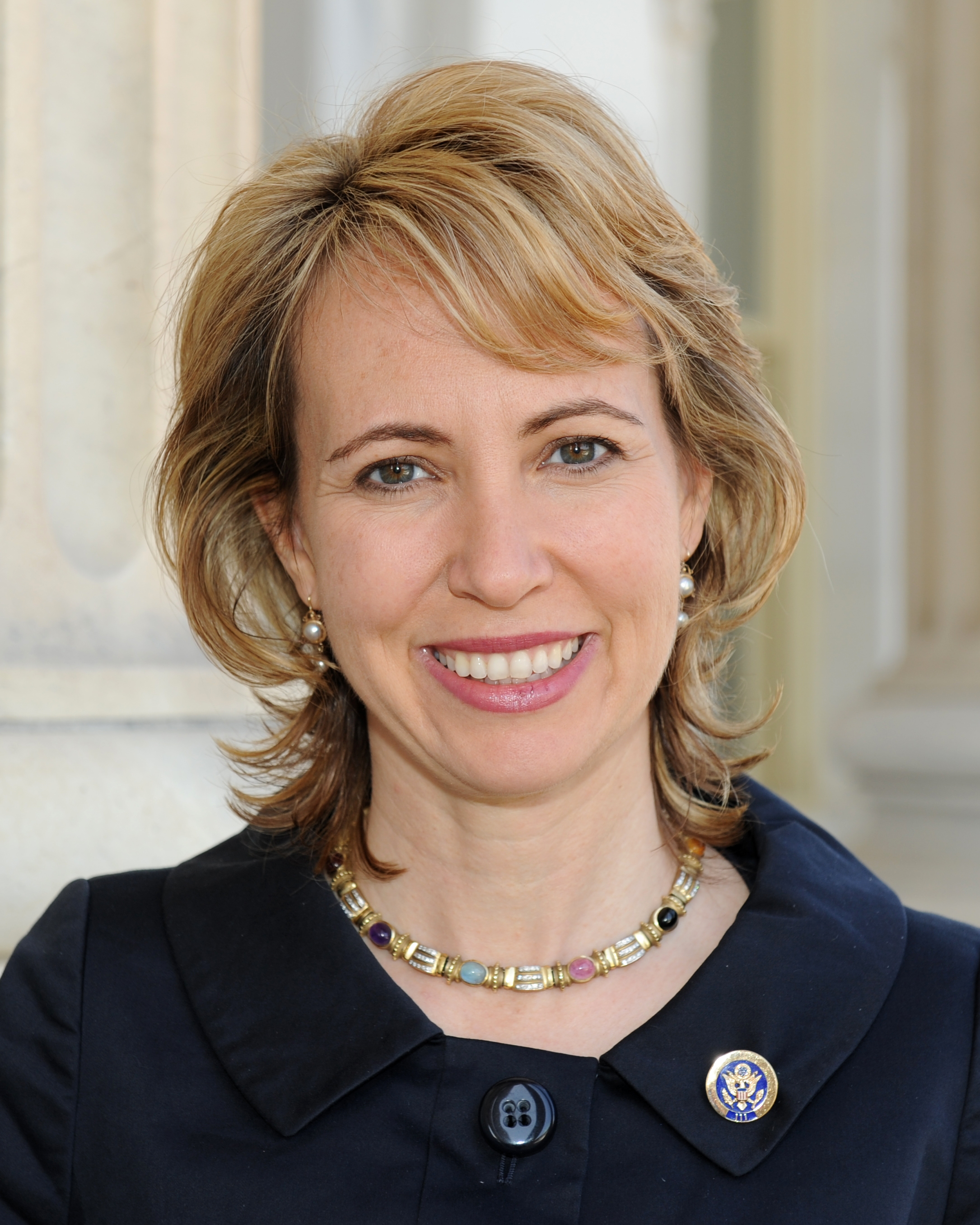
January 8: 2011 Tucson shooting – US Rep. Gabby Giffords is among 14 injured; 6 others are killed.

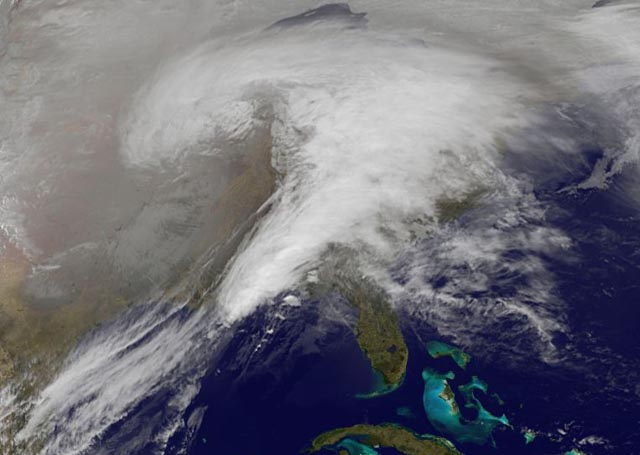
January 31 – February 2: Groundhog Day blizzard – Satellite image of the storm on the evening of February 1 over the American Midwest

- January 3
  - According to Dr. Daniel Haber, chief of Massachusetts General Hospital's cancer center, virtually unlimited metastatic cancer detection becomes possible using a screening method that can find cancer in the periphery. Further, the method appears to be a sound process for monitoring the progress of intervention and thereby modifying the treatment protocol.
  - Lawmakers in 14 states (Alabama, Arizona, Delaware, Idaho, Indiana, Michigan, Mississippi, Montana, Nebraska, New Hampshire, Oklahoma, Pennsylvania, Texas and Utah) announce plans to curtail application of parts of the 14th Amendment in their respective states.
  - Wisconsin becomes the 22nd state to sue the federal government over the Patient Protection and Affordable Care Act.
- January 6 – The US Constitution is read aloud on the floor of the US House of Representatives for the first time in history.
- January 7 – Oklahoma and Wyoming join the other 22 states suing the federal government over the Patient Protection and Affordable Care Act.
- January 8 – 2011 Tucson shooting: In Tucson, Arizona, a gunman opens fire at a constituent meeting led by U.S. representative Gabby Giffords, injuring 14, including Giffords, and killing six, including U.S. Federal Judge John Roll. The primary suspect, Jared Lee Loughner, is taken into custody.
- January 10
  - Former Republican United States House of Representatives Majority Leader Tom DeLay is sentenced to three years in prison for money laundering.
  - In college football, the #1 Auburn Tigers defeat the #2 Oregon Ducks to win the 2011 BCS National Championship Game by a score of 22–19.
- January 11 – Ohio becomes the 25th state to sue the federal government over the Patient Protection and Affordable Care Act.
- January 12 – Kansas and Maine join the other 25 states suing the federal government over the Patient Protection and Affordable Care Act.
- January 18 – U.S. president Barack Obama begins a four-day meeting with Chinese president Hu Jintao.
- January 19
  - Kermit Gosnell, his wife and eight staff members at his Philadelphia abortion clinic are arrested in connection with murders of babies, manslaughter of a patient and prescription drug charges. Prosecutors alleged that Gosnell and others killed babies at the clinic by severing their spinal cords with scissors.
  - The US House votes to repeal the Patient Protection and Affordable Care Act with a vote of 245–189.
- January 20 – In a landmark study, a new technique renders T-Cells resistant to HIV.
- January 25 – U.S. president Barack Obama delivers his 2011 State of the Union Address.
- January 31 – Florida federal judge Roger Vinson rules that the Patient Protection and Affordable Care Act is unconstitutional because of the individual mandate it contains.
- January 31–February 2 – A blizzard dumps as much as 2 feet (60 cm) of snow across the Midwestern United States, causing at least 24 storm-related deaths.

=== February ===
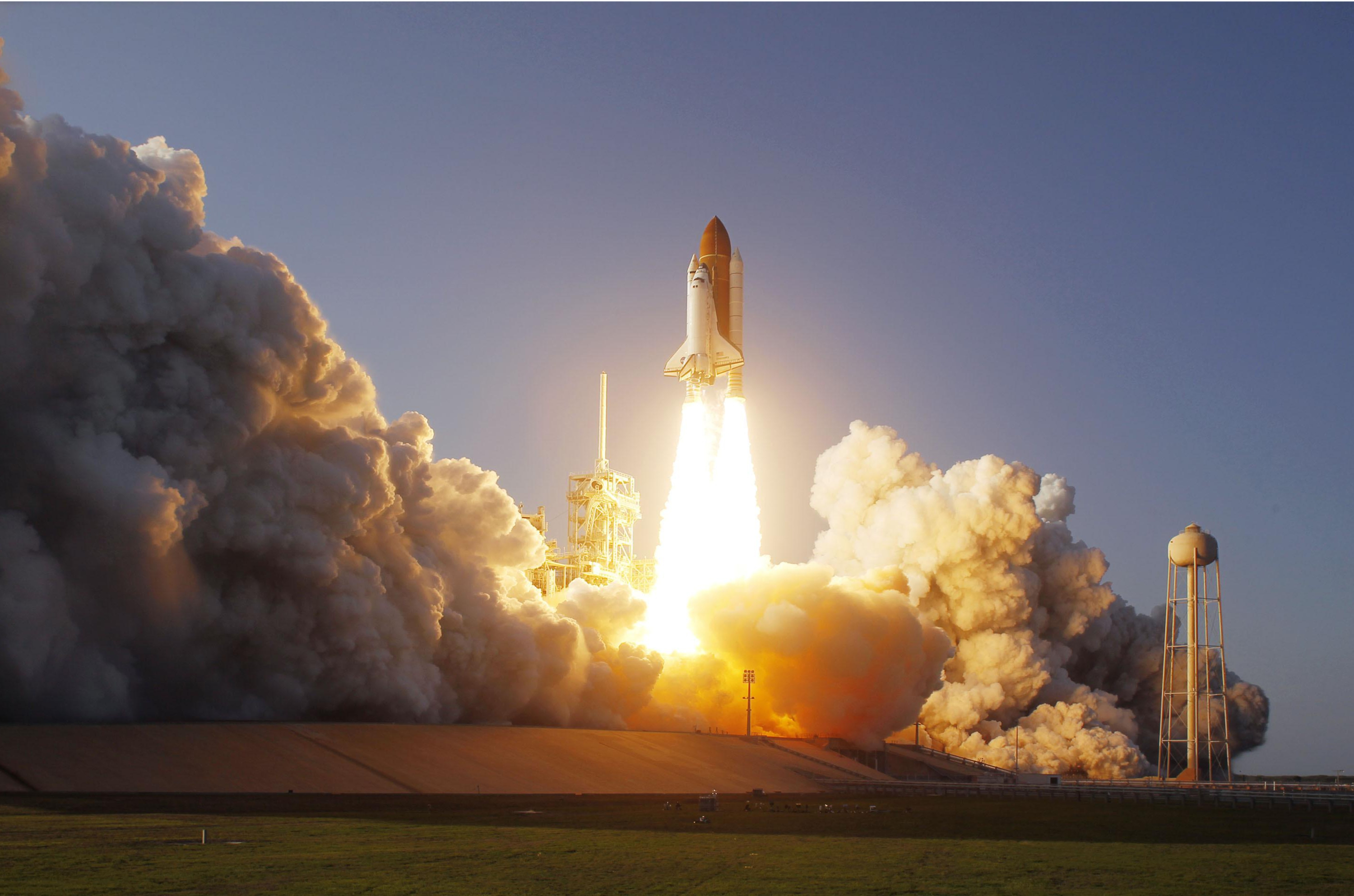
February 24: STS-133: Space Shuttle Discovery launches for the final time.

- February 2 – The US Senate blocks a repeal of the Patient Protection and Affordable Care Act with a vote of 51–47.
- February 6
  - NASA's STEREO satellites obtain the first simultaneous images of the entire surface of the Sun.
  - Super Bowl XLV between the Green Bay Packers and the Pittsburgh Steelers at Cowboys Stadium in Arlington, Texas becomes the most watched television program in US history at 111 million viewers. The Packers defeat the Steelers 31–25.
- February 7 – AOL purchases online publisher The Huffington Post in a $315 million deal.
- February 14
  - President Obama proposes a federal budget for fiscal year 2012. Overall the proposal reduces expenses but also increases funding for some programs and still results in an annual deficit of more than $1 trillion.
  - The House approves the extension of some parts of the controversial Patriot Act until December.
  - Disney Channel's daily morning program block for preschoolers, Playhouse Disney, rebrands as Disney Junior, part of the network's plan to establish Disney Junior as a stand-alone network in 2012 (replacing SOAPNet).
- February 14–16 – The quiz show Jeopardy! airs the victory of IBM's artificial intelligence program Watson over two of the show's most successful contestants.
- February 15 – The Senate approves the same extension of some parts of the controversial Patriot Act until December.
- February 17 – Amidst large demonstrations in Wisconsin over a controversial bill (the bill intends to reduce spending on most government employees and remove their collective bargaining rights apart from restricted wage negotiation), 14 Wisconsin Democratic senators flee the state to delay the vote on the bill by preventing a quorum in the senate.
- February 18 – Word Worm word game is released.
- February 20 – 2011 Daytona 500 is won by the Wood Brothers Racing team entrant Trevor Bayne, who became the youngest winner of the race. Carl Edwards was second ahead of David Gilliland.
- February 22 – Chicago mayoral election, 2011: Former White House Chief of Staff Rahm Emanuel wins the race for mayor with more than 55% of the vote. He will succeed Mayor Richard M. Daley in May.
- February 24 – STS-133: Space Shuttle Discovery launches from Kennedy Space Center for the final time, carrying the Permanent Multipurpose Module to the International Space Station.
- February 27
  - The 83rd Academy Awards, hosted by James Franco and Anne Hathaway, are held at Kodak Theatre in Hollywood. Tom Hooper's The King's Speech wins four awards out of 12 nominations, including Best Picture and Best Director. Christopher Nolan's Inception also wins four awards. The telecast garners 37.9 million viewers.
  - Frank Buckles, America's last surviving World War I veteran and one of only three verified surviving veterans of the war worldwide, dies aged 110. Buckles, who lived in West Virginia, served in Europe as an ambulance driver for 11 months until the war's end in November 1918.

=== March ===
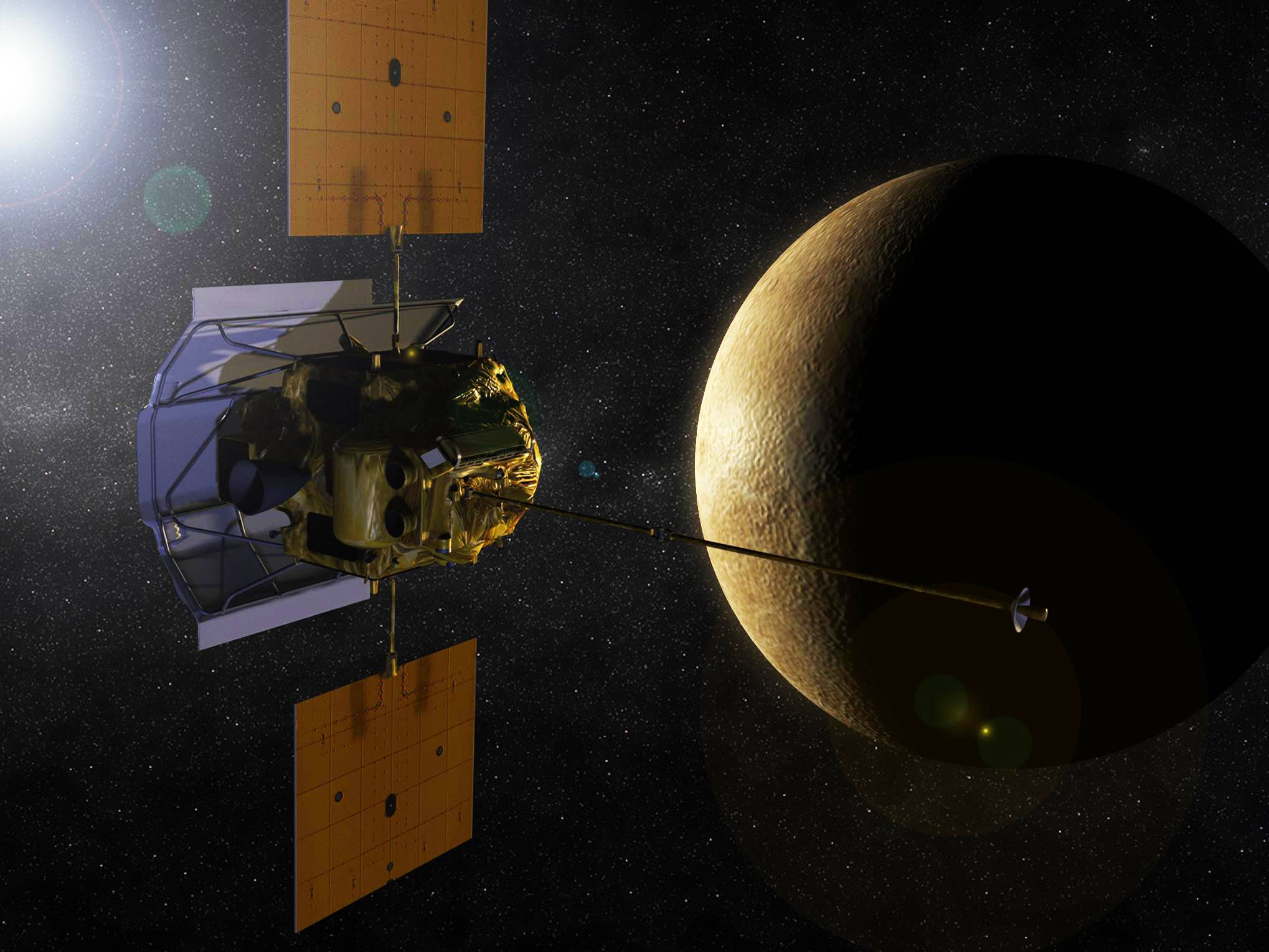
March 18: Artist's rendering of NASA's Messinger orbiting Mercury

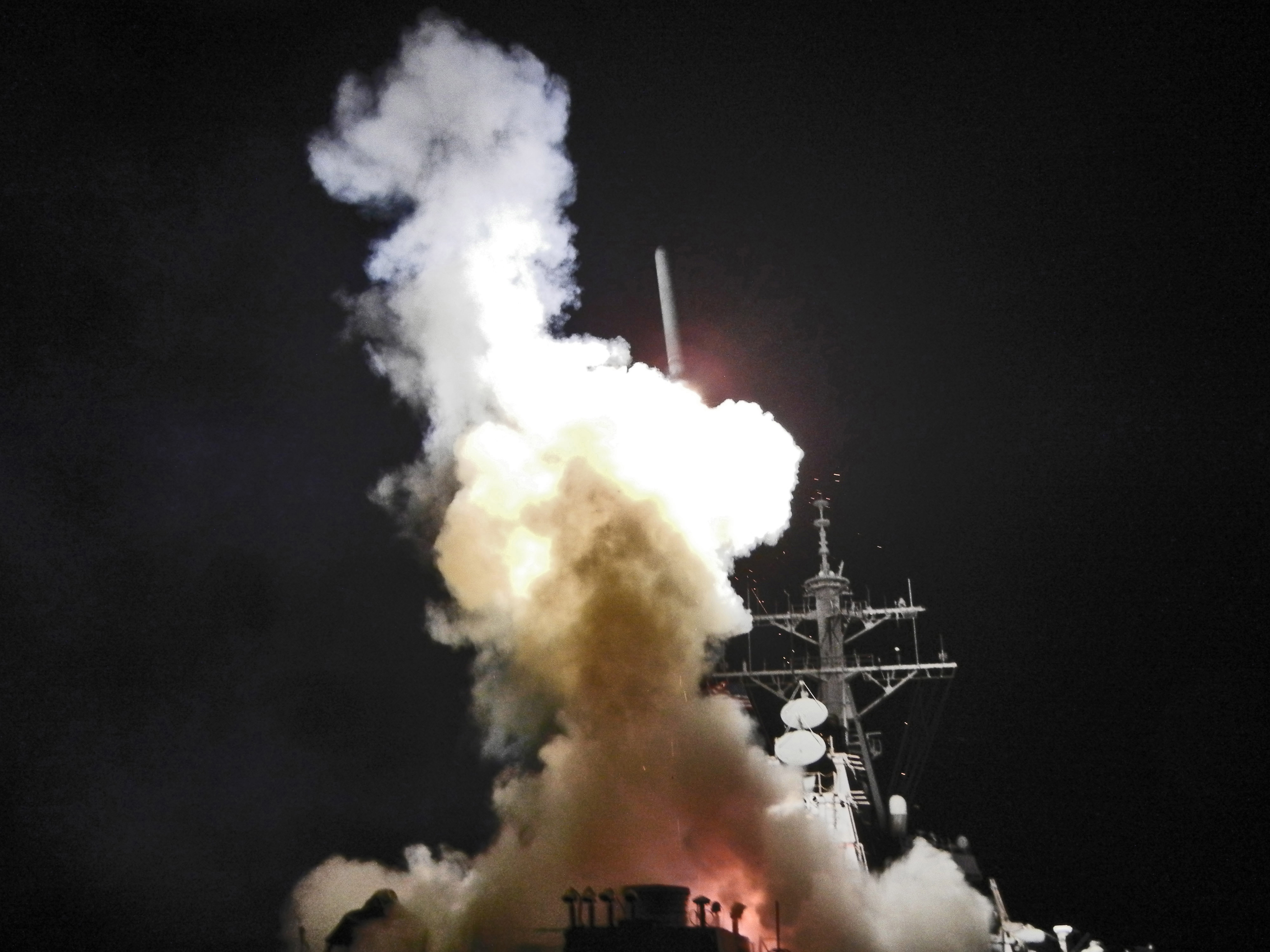
March 19: French, British and American forces launch attacks on pro-Gaddafi troops in Libya in support of United Nations Security Council Resolution 1973.

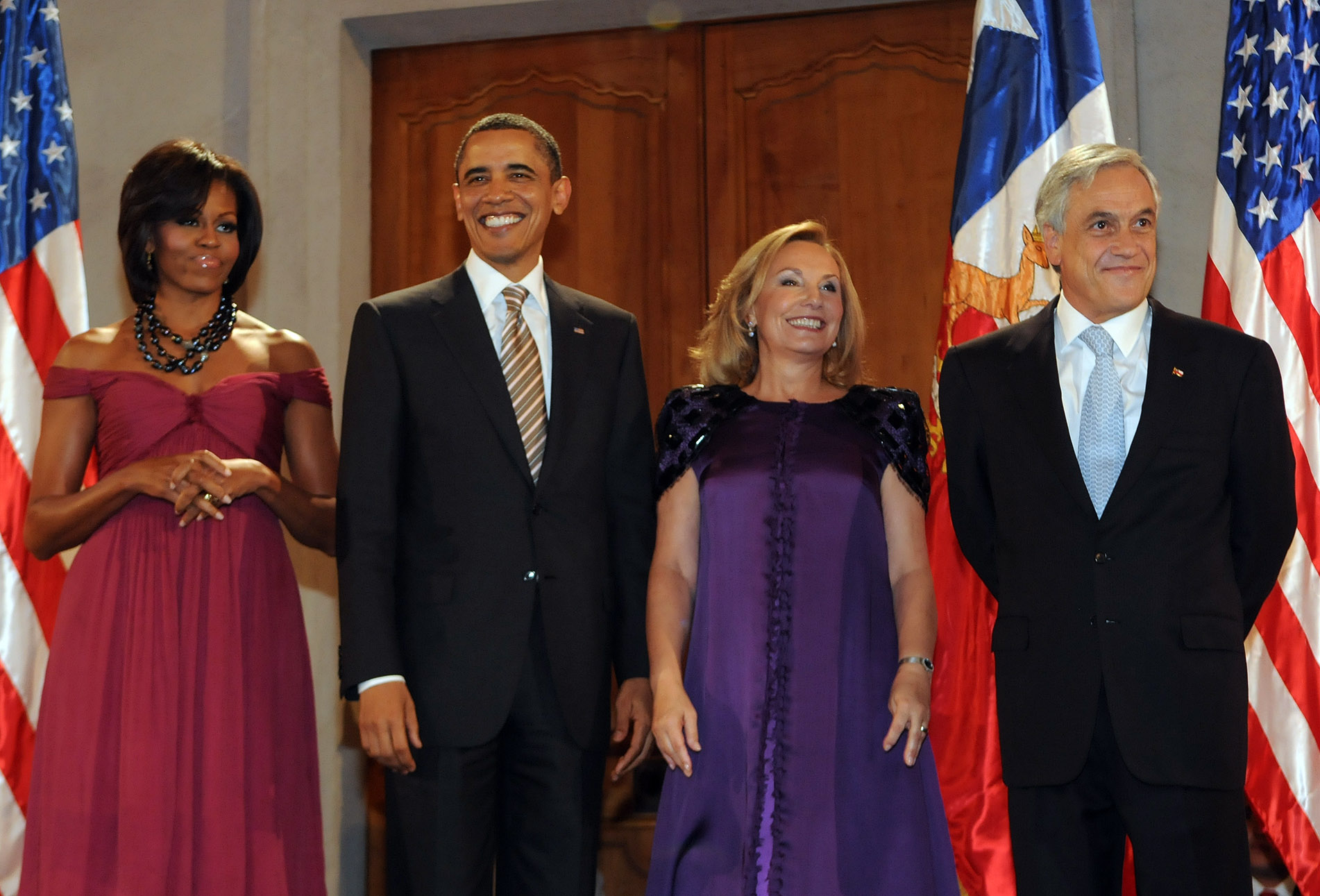
March 21: U.S. President Barack Obama (second left) and his wife of First Lady Michelle Obama (left) meets with Chilean President Sebastián Piñera (second right) and his wife of First Lady Cecilia Morel at the La Moneda Palace in Santiago, Chile, on March 21, 2011.

- March 1 – The U.S. House of Representatives passes a small spending bill that funds the federal government until March 18 and cuts $4 billion in spending, averting a potential government shutdown.
- March 3
  - Serena Williams' spokeswoman confirmed that Williams had suffered from a life-threatening pulmonary embolism.
  - The U.S. Supreme Court makes a controversial 8–1 decision that the controversial protests of the Westboro Baptist Church at fallen US military members' funerals are a form of protected speech under the First Amendment.
  - The U.S. Senate passes the same small spending bill that funds the federal government through March 18 and cuts $4 billion in spending.
- March 9
  - Space Shuttle Discovery lands at the Shuttle Landing Facility in Florida on its final mission, STS-133. The vehicle clocked 365 days in orbit during its 27-year career, beginning with STS-41-D in fall 1984.
  - Governor of Illinois Pat Quinn signs legislation abolishing the state's death penalty and commutes the death sentences of the fifteen inmates on Illinois' death row to life imprisonment without the possibility of parole.
  - The Wisconsin Senate approves a bill that ends most collective bargaining rights for nearly all unions; it was able to pass the legislation without a quorum by removing the budget oriented parts of it (a quorum would have necessitated the presence of at least one of the absent Democratic members).
  - The world's largest bond fund, Pimco, announces it is dumping all of its U.S. government-related securities, including U.S. Treasurys and agency debt.
- March 10 – The Wisconsin State Assembly passes the law that restricts bargaining rights for unions in a 53–42 vote.
- March 11 – Following the Tōhoku earthquake and tsunami, the Pacific Tsunami Warning Center issues a tsunami warning to parts of the U.S. West Coast along the affected coastal areas in Alaska, Hawaii and the U.S. Territories in the Pacific Ocean.
- March 15 – The U.S. House of Representatives passes another small spending bill, avoiding the U.S. government shutdown until April 8.
- March 16 – Wholesale food prices rose by the largest monthly increase in February since November 1974, with an increase of 3.9%. Some economists claim that it will only get worse.
- March 17
  - The House cuts all federal funding for NPR.
  - The US Senate passes a small spending bill, avoiding a government shutdown until April 8.
- March 18 – NASA's MESSENGER spacecraft becomes the first man-made technology to establish an orbit around Mercury.
- March 19 – In light of the continuing attacks on Libyan rebels by Gaddafi forces, military intervention authorized under UNSCR 1973 began as French fighter jets flew reconnaissance flights over Libya. United States Navy ships were said to be preparing for bombardment of Libyan air defenses.
- March 20
  - AT&T announces plans to buy T-Mobile for $39 billion. If allowed by the Federal Communications Commission, AT&T would become the largest US phone carrier, surpassing Verizon Wireless. If allowed, the number of major US phone carriers would decrease from 4 to 3, leaving AT&T, Verizon and Sprint.
- March 24 – According to a landmark study in The New England Journal of Medicine, an orally administered Takeda Pharmaceutical called pioglitazone, marketed as Actos, shows 72 percent effectiveness at the prevention of the development of type 2 diabetes in pre-diabetic subject participants. Ralph DeFronzo, M.D., study leader and professor in the School of Medicine and chief of the diabetes division at The University of Texas Health Science Center in San Antonio, stated that "It's a blockbuster study. The 72 reduction is the largest decrease in the conversion rate of pre-diabetes to diabetes that has ever been demonstrated by any intervention, be it diet, exercise or medication.
- March 25 – Archaeologists report that they have found new artifacts in an archaeological site in Texas which indicates of human existence in America 15,500 years ago – around 2,000 years earlier than the alleged Clovis culture took place, which until recently was considered the first human culture in North America.
- March 29 – More than 1.5 million web sites around the world had been infected by the LizaMoon SQL injection attack spread by scareware since Tuesday. Novice computer users should be warned that when a pop up window opens the best way to insure you are not infected is to close the window from the task manager.
- March 31
  - Because of U.S. federal budget woes and a general migration of information from printed to digital format, the Social Security Administration announces that starting in April 2011, most U.S. workers will no longer receive their annual Social Security benefit estimates in the mail. Citizens are able to look at their social security account retirement benefit estimator online instead of waiting each year for a paper statement.
  - A data breach at one of the world's largest providers of marketing-email services, Dallas-based Epsilon, a subsidiary of Alliance Data Systems Corporation, may have enabled unauthorized people to access the names and email addresses for customers of major financial-services, retailing and other companies, (Citigroup Inc., J.P. Morgan Chase & Co., Barclays PLC, U.S. Bancorp, Capital One Financial Corp., Walgreen Co., New York & Co., Kroger Co., Brookstone, McKinsey & Co., Marriott International Inc., Ritz-Carlton and TiVo Inc.).

=== April ===
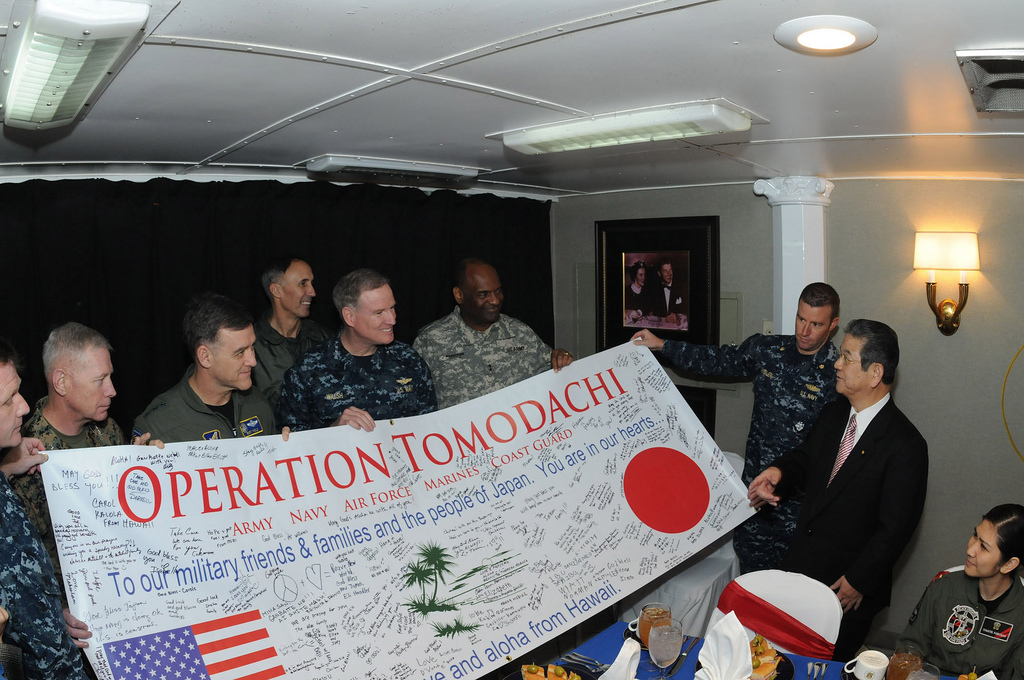
April 4: Japanese Defense Minister Toshimi Kitazawa given an Operation Tomodachi banner.

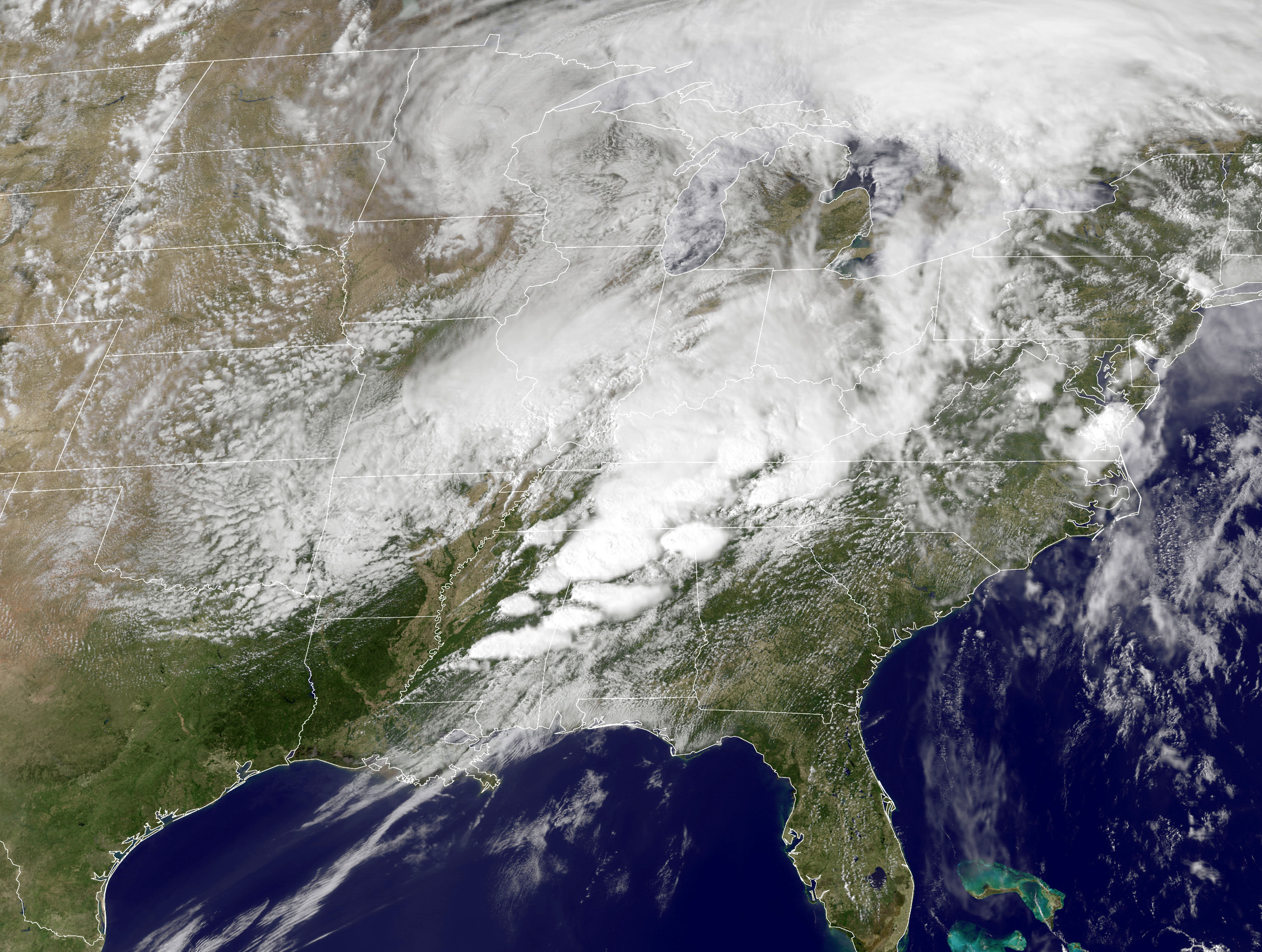
2011 Super Outbreak – Satellite image of the storm on the evening of April 27 over the American Southeast 339 total fatalities

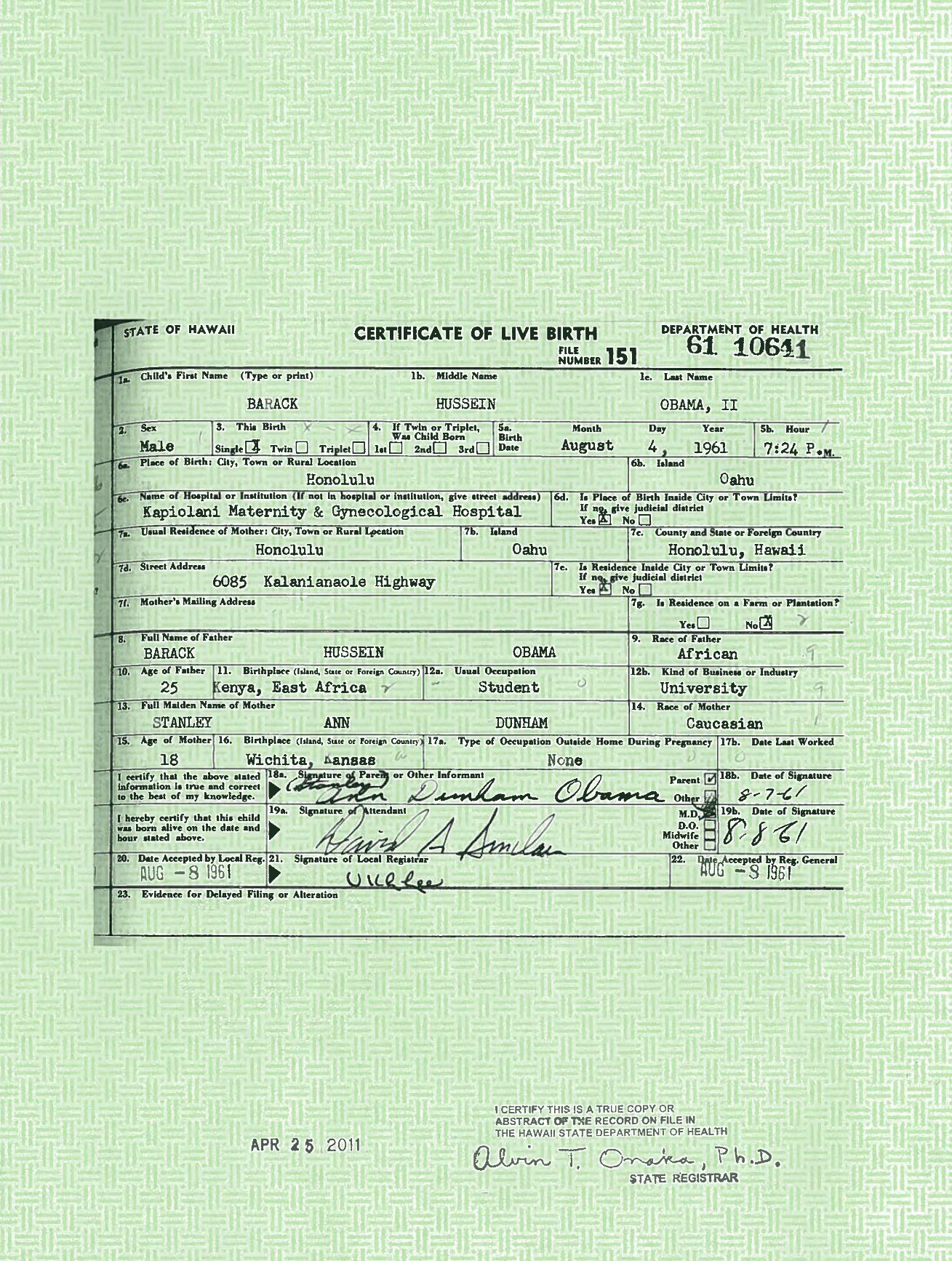
April 27: In response to the Barack Obama citizenship conspiracy theories by the mainstream media, that Obama was not born in the United States, Obama releases his original birth certificate form.

- April 3
  - World Wrestling Entertainment holds WrestleMania XXVII at the Georgia Dome in Atlanta, drawing a crowd of 71,617.
  - Crystal Mangum, the false accuser in the Duke lacrosse case, is arrested after repeatedly stabbing her boyfriend, Reginald Daye.
- April 4
  - The U.S. Supreme Court upholds Arizona School Vouchers in a 5–4 ruling.
  - In men's college basketball, the UConn Huskies defeat the Butler Bulldogs to win the 2011 NCAA Men's Division I Basketball Tournament.
- April 5
  - Cuba and its partners announce plans to drill for oil in Cuban waters in The Gulf of Mexico.
  - In women's college basketball, the Texas A&M Aggies defeat the Notre Dame Fighting Irish to win the 2011 NCAA Women's Division I Basketball Tournament.
- April 6 – A United States Navy F/A-18 crashes near Naval Air Station Lemoore in California, killing both crew members.
- April 8 – President Obama, House Republicans and Senate Democrats agree on a week-long stopgap spending bill preventing a government shutdown resulting from a failure to pass the 2011 federal budget.
- April 10 – 2011 Masters Tournament: South African Charl Schwartzel won the 2011 event by two strokes over Adam Scott and Jason Day.
- April 13
  - An Air France Airbus A380, operating as Air France Flight 007, collides with a Comair Bombardier CRJ-700, operating as Comair flight 553/Delta Connection Flight 6293 in Delta Connection livery, on a taxiway at John F. Kennedy International Airport in New York City. The double-deck Airbus A380 is the world's largest commercial passenger jet. The A380 has 520 people on board, and the smaller plane 66. There are no injuries. The incident brings into question the spatial taxiway requirements for the new large A380's wingspan on existing airport taxiways.
  - Reginald Daye dies 10 days after being repeatedly stabbed by Crystal Mangum, the false rape accuser in the Duke lacrosse case.
- April 14–16 – A tornado outbreak and severe thunderstorms kill at least 43 people across the Southern United States, with fatalities occurring in Oklahoma, Arkansas, Alabama, North Carolina and Virginia. It is the deadliest U.S. tornado outbreak to occur in three years.
- April 15 – Rio is released in theaters.
- April 18 – Standard & Poor's downgrades its outlook on long-term sovereign debt of the United States to negative from stable for the first time in history, citing "very large budget deficits and rising government indebtedness" as for why it did so. A statement from Standard & Poor's explained its reasoning; "We believe there is a material risk that U. S. policy-makers might not reach an agreement on how to address medium- and long-term budgetary challenges by 2013; if an agreement is not reached...this would...render the U.S. fiscal profile meaningfully weaker than [its peers]". This could possibly mean the US losing its AAA credit rating.
- April 20 – BooClips digital book app is released.
- April 25–28 – The most active tornado outbreak in United States history kills 339 people across the Southeastern United States, becoming the third deadliest tornado outbreak in United States history, falling behind the Tupelo-Gainesville tornado outbreak of April 1936 and the outbreak that produced the Tri-State Tornado of March 1925.
- April 27
  - Responding to continued coverage by the mainstream media of Barack Obama citizenship conspiracy theories, that President Barack Obama was born on August 4, 1961, in Honolulu, Hawaii, Obama releases his long-form birth certificate.
  - In an unprecedented meeting with reporters, the U.S. Federal Reserve chairman Ben Bernanke states that he expects less economic growth for 2011 as the economy has been weaker in recent months than he had thought it would be. Bernanke refused to speculate on when he would discontinue with The Federal Reserve's monetary stimulus policy, known as quantitative easing.
  - Eight American troops and one contractor are shot and killed by an Afghan National Army Air Force pilot. Five Afghan soldiers were also wounded in the attack, for which the Taliban claimed responsibility.

=== May ===
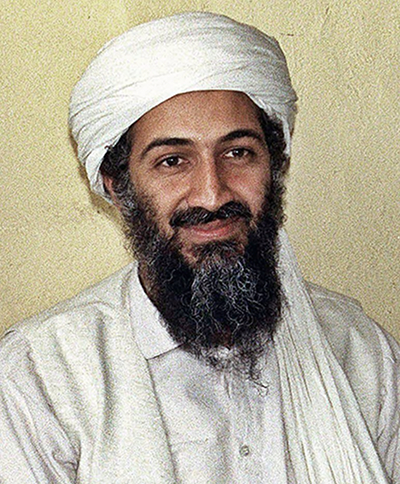
May 2: Death of Osama bin Laden

May 19: Map of Israel with pre-1967 borders. West Bank Gaza Strip Golan Heights

- May 2
  - U.S. President Barack Obama announces in a media statement that Osama bin Laden, the founder and leader of the militant group Al-Qaeda and the most-wanted fugitive on the U.S. list, was killed by U.S. forces during an American military operation in Pakistan and that his body is in U.S. custody.
  - Bin Laden's body, which was handled in accordance with Islamic practice and tradition, is buried by the U.S. forces at sea less than a day after his death, thus preventing a burial site from becoming a "terrorist shrine".
  - In order to save the city of Cairo, Illinois from severe flooding, the Army Corps of Engineers blows up the levee on the Missouri side of the Mississippi flooding acres of farmland and forcing some to go homeless. The issue went all the way to the Supreme Court.
- May 6 – Thor, directed by Kenneth Branagh, is released by Marvel Studios as the fourth film of the Marvel Cinematic Universe (MCU).
- May 7 – Jockey John R. Velazquez wins the 2011 Kentucky Derby riding Animal Kingdom.
- May 8 – Mississippi flooding worsens, killing 15 more than the 337 in preceding storms, with the Army Corps of Engineers saying an area between Simmesport, Louisiana and Baton Rouge would be inundated 20–30 feet.
- May 10 – 360,000 Citigroup credit card accounts are hacked.
- May 11 - Dom Strauss the then head of the UN, was arrested at New York JFK airport just before the plane was going to take off. He was accused of raping a woman in a New York City hotel earlier that day. The police stopped the plane and he was arrested and taken off the plane.
- May 12 – Plans are cancelled to install prismatic glass on One World Trade Center's bottom base.
- May 13 – The federal government predicts that the Medicare hospital fund will run out in 2024, five years earlier than the previously projected date of 2029. They also predicted that the Social Security trust fund would run out in 2036, instead of the previously projected date of 2037.
- May 14
  - The Morganza Spillway on the Mississippi River is opened for the second time in its history, deliberately flooding 3,000 square miles (7,800 km^{2}) of rural Louisiana and placing three nuclear power plants at risk to save most of Baton Rouge and New Orleans.
  - The president of the International Monetary Fund and candidate for President of France, Dominique Strauss-Kahn, is charged with raping a maid in a New York City hotel room.
- May 16
  - STS-134: Space Shuttle Endeavour is launched for the final time at 8:56 A. M. EDT.
  - The U.S. Supreme Court makes a controversial 8-1 decision that the exigent circumstance warrantless searches do not violate the Fourth Amendment when it is believed that there is an imminent destruction of evidence." Writing for the majority, Associate Justice Samuel Alito said that citizens are under no obligation to respond when law enforcement knocks at the door or, if they do open the door, allow the police to come in. In cases where no exigent circumstances exist, police officers who desire entry would have to persuade a judge to issue a search warrant. But Alito said, "Occupants who choose not to stand on their constitutional rights but instead elect to attempt to destroy evidence [had] only themselves to blame."
  - Congress considers whether and by how much to extend the debt ceiling again. In a May 16, 2011 letter to Congress, U.S. Treasury Secretary Timothy Geithner declared a "debt issuance suspension period", which provides the Secretary with certain extraordinary authorities to prevent a breach of the debt limit. Geithner had previously sent letters to Congress requesting an increase in the debt ceiling on January 6, April 4 and May 2.
- May 19
  - In Pennsylvania, teenager Angela Marinucci becomes the first of The Greensburg Six to be convicted of the murder of Jennifer Daugherty, a mentally disabled woman who was tortured and murdered in February 2010.
  - During a speech in support of the Arab Spring, Obama stated that a resolution to the Israeli–Palestinian conflict would involve creation of a Palestinian state based on the pre-1967 borders.
- May 20
  - During a meeting between U.S. president Barack Obama and Israeli Prime Minister Benjamin Netanyahu at the White House, Netanyahu emphasizes that Israel would not make a full withdraw to the pre-1967 borders as Obama requested the previous day because these borders are not defensible.
  - Travel on the Mississippi River is closed for five miles (8 km) near the US city of Baton Rouge, Louisiana due to flooding.
  - WWE wrestler Randy Savage dies of a heart attack in Seminole, Florida when he loses control of his Jeep Wrangler and crashes into a tree; he was 58 years old.
- May 21
  - U.S. businessman Herman Cain announces that he will be seeking the Republican Party nomination in the 2012 U.S. presidential election.
  - The Minnesota House of Representatives votes to put a constitutional referendum on marriage before voters in the US state of Minnesota.
- May 22 – A tornado touched down in Joplin, Missouri, causing widespread damage. 158 are killed and 1,150 are injured, making it the deadliest U.S. tornado in 64 years.
- May 23 – The U.S. Supreme Court makes a controversial 5-4 decision that court-mandated population limit was necessary to remedy a violation of prisoners’ Eighth Amendment constitutional rights (United States Constitution's prohibition against cruel and unusual punishment). The court requires that there be a controversial prisoner reduction plan forced on California prison administrators whereby the state reduces its inmate population by tens-of-thousands to ease overcrowding. Writing for the majority, Associate Justice Anthony Kennedy said that "after years of litigation, it became apparent that a remedy for the constitutional violations would not be effective absent a reduction in the prison system population".
- May 25
  - Jared Loughner, the man charged with the 2011 Tucson shooting, is found by a federal judge to be incompetent to stand trial.
  - Oprah Winfrey hosts the finale of her syndicated talk show, which was on the air for 25 years.
- May 26 – The U.S. Supreme Court makes a controversial 5–3 decision which upheld the Arizona state law that monetarily (up to and including seizure, but not criminally) punished businesses that hire illegal aliens.
- May 27 – The Space Shuttle spacewalk portions of the International Space Station are completed.
- May 28 – U.S.-based missile producer Lockheed Martin, the largest military contractor in the world, is targeted by a "significant and tenacious" cyber attack.
- May 29
  - Indy-style British racer Dan Wheldon wins the 2011 Indianapolis 500.
  - The Wallow Fire begins, named for the Bear Wallow Wilderness area where the fire originated, in eastern Arizona, in the White Mountains near Alpine. By June 7, 2011, it had burned about 389,000 acres (608 sq mi; 157,000 ha).
- May 31
  - The U.S. Supreme Court makes a limited-usage (narrow in scope and application) 8-0 decision which sided with former United States Attorney General John Ashcroft in a claim for damages against a public official.
  - The U.S. Supreme Court makes a limited-usage (narrow in scope and application) 8-1 decision which sided with SEB S. A. in a patent infringement case.

=== June ===
- June – US-International Women in Science Dialogue conference is held.
- June 1
  - The Obama administration states that it will boycott a United Nations anti-racism conference because of concerns over Anti-Semitism.
  - The new United States military strategy explicitly states that a cyberattack is casus belli for a traditional act of war.
  - STS-134: Space Shuttle Endeavour lands for the final time, after 19 years of orbital spaceflight.
- June 2
  - The Federal Bureau of Investigation investigate claims that hackers in China attacked the Google email accounts of officials in the United States and Asian countries, as well as Chinese pro-democracy activists.
  - Mitt Romney announces plans to seek the Republican Party nomination as President of the United States.
- June 3 – John Edwards, former United States presidential candidate and Senator representing North Carolina, is indicted on charges of conspiracy and violating campaign finance laws in connection to his affair with Rielle Hunter; Edwards denies he broke any laws.
- June 6
  - The U.S. Supreme Court makes a 7–2 decision that inventors do not give up their patent rights to their employers if that employer received federal funding. The ruling went against Stanford University in a dispute of patent infringement over a Roche HIV PCR detection test. Writing for the majority, Chief Justice John Roberts said that "Since 1790, the patent law has operated on the premise that rights in an invention belong to the inventor. The question here is whether the University and Small Business Patent Procedures Act of 1980—commonly referred to as the Bayh–Dole Act—displaces that norm and automatically vests title to federally funded inventions in federal contractors. We hold that it does not."
  - Anthony Weiner photo scandal: Representative Anthony Weiner (D-NY) admits he sent a lewd photo of himself over Twitter to a Washington woman. He also admits sending explicit photos and messages to at least 6 other woman over the past 3 years. He states that he will not resign.
- June 8 – Fazul Abdullah Mohammed, mastermind of the 1998 United States embassy bombings in Kenya and Tanzania, is killed in Somalia.
- June 9 – The U.S. Supreme Court makes an 8–0 decision that in patent dispute challenges against inventors the standard of proof required is more than a preponderance of evidence. The ruling upholds a 2009 jury verdict in favor of i4i in a dispute of patent infringement over a Microsoft Word software editing subprogram. Writing for the majority, Associate Justice Sonia Sotomayor said that "Under §282 of the Patent Act of 1952, "[a] patent shall be presumed valid" and "[t]he burden of establishing in-validity of a patent or any claim thereof shall rest on the party asserting such invalidity." 35 U. S. C. §282. We consider whether §282 requires an invalidity defense to be proved by clear and convincing evidence. We hold that it does."
- June 12
  - The Dallas Mavericks win their first NBA championship, four games to two, against the star-studded Miami Heat in the 2011 NBA Finals.
  - The coat of Mad Men star Christina Hendricks catches fire and bursts into flames at the Tony Awards after party. She was said to be unharmed.
- June 13 – Hackers break Into US Senate computers.
- June 15 – The Boston Bruins win their first NHL title in 39 years over the Vancouver Canucks in the 2011 Stanley Cup Finals.
- June 16
  - Anthony Weiner photo scandal: Representative Anthony Weiner (D-NY) resigns.
  - The U.S. Supreme Court makes a controversial 5–4 decision that, in the interrogations of minors, a Miranda statement must be made. The ruling involves a 13-year-old child under schoolroom police interview. The court ruled in favor of the child, J. D. B., in a dispute of his confession made during a North Carolina theft investigation. Writing for the majority, Associate Justice Sonia Sotomayor said that "This case presents the question whether the age of a child subjected to police questioning is relevant to the custody analysis of Miranda v. Arizona, 384 U. S. 436 (1966). It is beyond dispute that children will often feel bound to submit to police questioning when an adult in the same circumstances would feel free to leave. Seeing no reason for police officers or courts to blind themselves to that commonsense reality, we hold that a child's age properly informs the Miranda custody analysis."
  - On March 19, because of the continuing attacks on Libyan rebels by Gaddafi forces, there was a military intervention authorized under UNSCR 1973. Various forces including ones from the United States attacked with fighter jets in bombardment over Libya. Ten Congressman announce plans to sue President Barack Obama in Federal court over violation of the War Powers Resolution. The 10 Congressman include 3 Democrats, Dennis Kucinich of Ohio, John Conyers of Michigan and Michael Capuano of Massachusetts, as well as 7 Republicans, Ron Paul of Texas, Walter Jones and Howard Coble of North Carolina, Tim Johnson of Illinois, Dan Burton of Indiana, Jimmy Duncan of Tennessee and Roscoe Bartlett of Maryland.
- June 19 – Northern Ireland golfer Rory McIlroy wins the 2011 U.S. Open, setting scoring records in the process.
- June 20
  - The internet domain names can now be any "dot"-suffix. The Internet Corporation for Assigned Names and Numbers (ICANN) approved the change.
  - The U.S. Supreme Court makes a controversial 9–0 decision that, in large class-action lawsuits, a cohesive element must exist. The ruling involves the class-action status of a sex discrimination case against Wal-mart containing 1.6 million litigants. The court ruled in favor of Wal-mart, only on the class action status of the dispute of the women's claims. The ruling rejects the lower courts lowering of standards in class-action status certification. Writing for the majority, Associate Justice Antonin Scalia said that "We are presented with one of the most expansive class actions ever. The District Court and the Court of Appeals approved the certification of a class comprising about one and a half million plaintiffs, current and former female employees of petitioner Wal-Mart who allege that the discretion exercised by their local supervisors over pay and promotion matters violates Title VII by discriminating against women. In addition to injunctive and declaratory relief, the plaintiffs seek an award of backpay. We consider whether the certification of the plaintiff class was consistent with Federal Rules of Civil Procedure 23(a) and (b)(2)."
- June 21 – The Food and Drug Administration announces that starting in 2012, they will require new warning labels that feature graphic images to convey the dangers of smoking on U.S. cigarette packs.
- June 22
  - The Congressional Budget Office predicts the US debt-to-GDP ratio will top 101% by 2021, 10% higher than the 91% previously projected. Further predictions show an increase to 150% by 2030 and 200% by 2037. This assumes current spending levels continue.
  - 82-year-old Boston mob boss James "Whitey" Bulger, wanted for his alleged role in 19 murders, is captured by the FBI in Santa Monica, California after 16 years as a fugitive.
- June 23 – The U.S. Supreme Court makes a 5–4 decision that, in will lawsuits, bankruptcy state courts are superseded by will courts in matters of core proceedings. The ruling involves the US$1.6 billion estate of J. Howard Marshall Jr. between Anna Nicole Smith and Pierce Marshall. The court ruled in favor of the estate of the deceased Pierce Marshall and the Texas Probate Court versus the estate of the deceased Vickie Lynn Marshall (a.k.a. Anna Nicole Smith) and the California Bankruptcy Court. Writing for the majority, Chief Justice John Roberts said that "... the Texas state decision controlled, after concluding that the Bankruptcy Court lacked the authority to enter final judgment on a counter claim that Vickie brought against Pierce in her bankruptcy proceeding. 1 To determine whether the Court of Appeals was correct in that regard, we must resolve two issues: (1) whether the Bankruptcy Court had the statutory authority under 28 U. S. C. §157(b) to issue a final judgment on Vickie's counterclaim; and (2) if so, whether conferring that authority on the Bankruptcy Court is constitutional ... We conclude that, although the Bankruptcy Court had the statutory authority to enter judgment on Vickie's counterclaim, it lacked the constitutional authority to do so."
- June 24
  - New York becomes the sixth state to legalize same-sex marriage.
  - Pixar Animation Studios' twelfth feature film, Cars 2, the sequel to 2006's Cars, is released in theaters.
- June 27
  - The U.S. Supreme Court makes a 7–2 decision that strikes down a California law enacted in 2005 that bans the sale of certain violent video games to children without parental supervision. The Court upholds the lower court decisions and revokes the law, ruling that video games were protected speech under the First Amendment as other forms of media. The ruling involves a freedom of speech case by The Entertainment Merchants Association against a California law. The court ruled in favor of The Entertainment Merchants Association, only on the overly broad status of the statute's wording of the minors' rights. Writing for the majority, Associate Justice Antonin Scalia said that "We consider whether a California law imposing restrictions on violent video games comports with the First Amendment...Because the Act imposes a restriction on the content of protected speech, it is invalid unless California can demonstrate that it passes strict scrutiny—that is, unless it is justified by a compelling government interest and is narrowly drawn to serve that interest. R. A. V., 505 U. S., at 395. The State must specifically identify an "actual problem" in need of solving, Playboy, 529 U. S., at 822–823, and the curtailment of free speech must be actually necessary to the solution, see R. A. V., supra, at 395. That is a demanding standard. "It is rare that a regulation restricting speech because of its content will ever be permissible." Playboy, supra, at 818. California cannot meet that standard...And finally, the Act's purported aid to parental authority is vastly overinclusive. Not all of the children who are forbidden to purchase violent video games on their own have parents who care whether they purchase violent video games."
  - Former Illinois governor Rod Blagojevich is found guilty of 17 of the 20 counts against him, including trying to sell President Barack Obama's Senate seat.
- June 28
  - In baseball, a judge in the U.S. state of Delaware authorizes the Los Angeles Dodgers to enter into a $150 million bankruptcy financing deal after the club addresses concerns of Major League Baseball.
  - Richard Poplawski is sentenced to death in the murder of three Pittsburgh police officers in April 2009.
- June 29 –Transformers: Dark of the Moon is released in theaters as the third film in the Transformers film series.

=== July ===
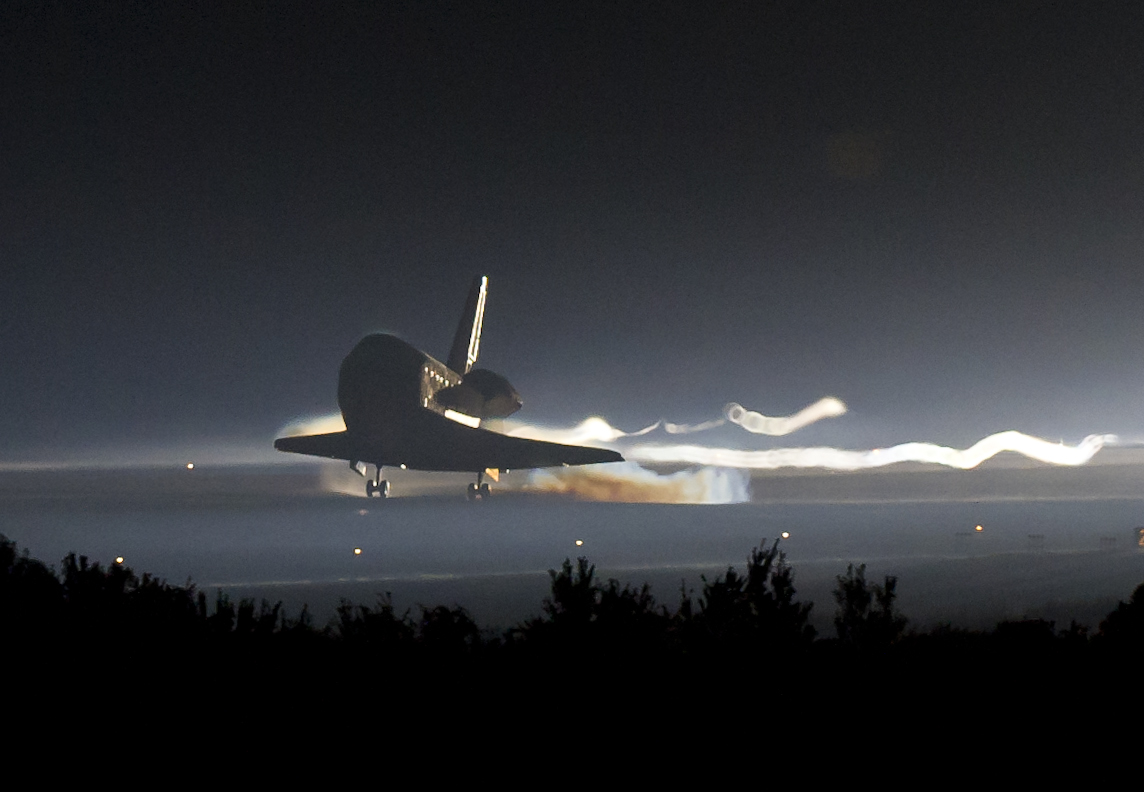
July 21: The final mission of the Space Shuttle program, STS-135, ends as Atlantis lands at Kennedy Space Center.

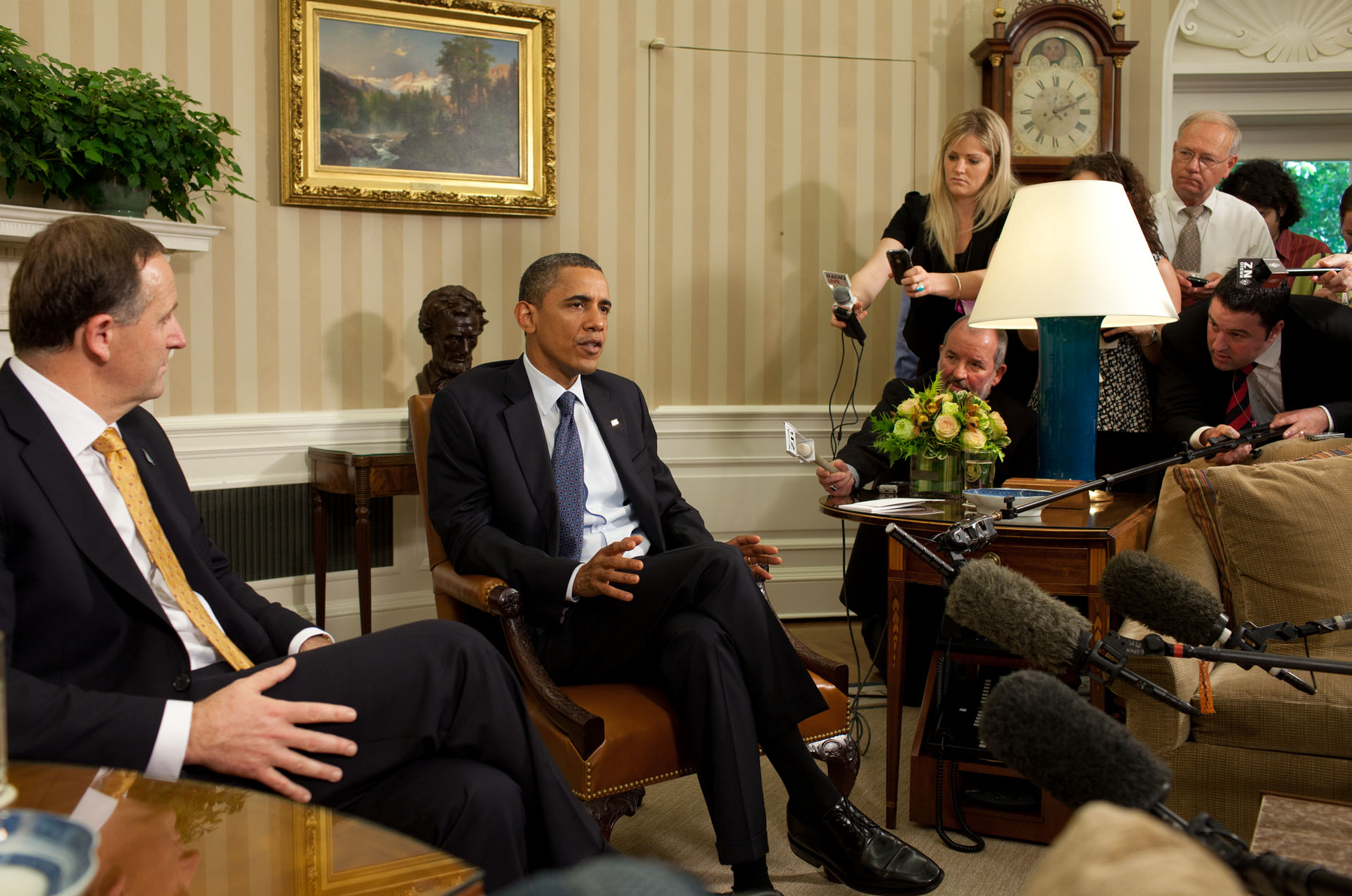
July 22: U.S. president Barack Obama meets with New Zealand Prime Minister John Key makes a statement to the press conference at the Oval Office in the White House, on July 22, 2011.

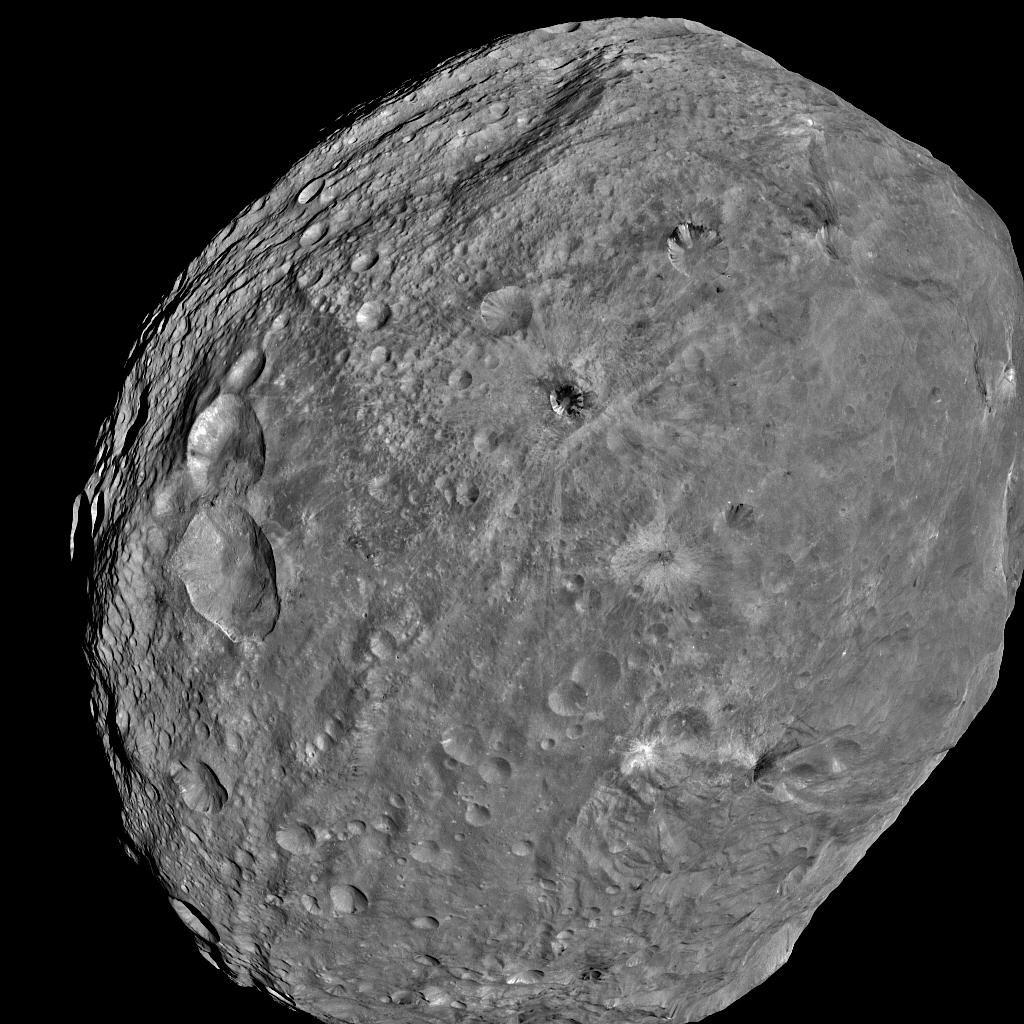
July 24: An image of 4 Vesta taken by the Dawn spacecraft from a distance of 3,200 miles (5,200 km)

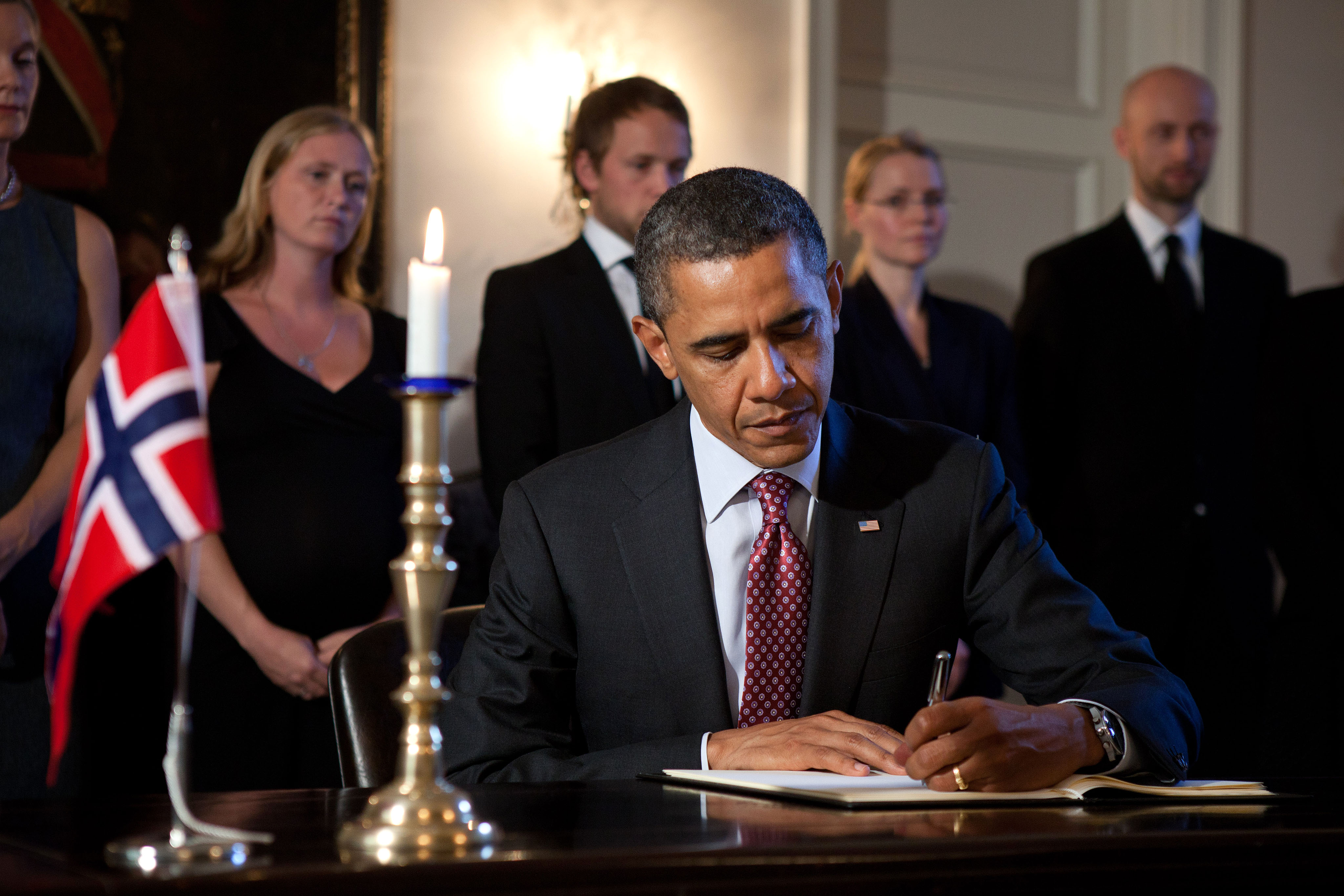
July 26: U.S. president Barack Obama signs the condolence book for a victims of the 2011 Norway attacks, during a visit to the Norwegian ambassador's residence in Washington, D.C.

- July 1
  - The New York Times sexual assault case against former International Monetary Fund head Dominique Strauss-Kahn is on the verge of collapse due to concerns over the credibility of the alleged victim's testimony. A judge releases him from house arrest as prosecutors said that the maid had made false statements.
  - Owners in the North American National Basketball Association start a lock out after failing to reach a new collective bargaining agreement.
  - The Minnesota government shuts down after budget talks fail between Democratic governor Mark Dayton and the Republican-controlled Minnesota Legislature.
  - According to a 2012 U.S. Census Bureau estimate, for the first time, the majority of children under one year old are minorities.
  - Leon Panetta is sworn in as the new Secretary of Defense, succeeding Robert Gates.
- July 2 – ExxonMobil workers attempt to contain an oil spill on the Yellowstone River in the U.S. state of Montana.
- July 3 – A tourist boat sinks in the Gulf of California off the coast of Baja California in Mexico with 23 people missing.
- July 5
  - The US city of Phoenix, Arizona is hit by a large dust storm leaving thousands of people without power and grounding flights at Phoenix Airport.
  - Casey Anthony is found not guilty of first degree murder and manslaughter in the death of her daughter Caylee, but found guilty of four misdemeanor counts of giving false information to police.
- July 7
  - The U.S. Supreme Court makes a controversial 5–4 decision that Humberto Leal García, a Mexican national, should be executed in the US state of Texas despite concerns over whether the circumstances of his execution would breach international law.
  - Casey Anthony is sentenced to four years for lying to law enforcement regarding the death of her child Caylee in the U.S. state of Florida but after credit for time served, will be released on July 17.
  - Seven people are shot dead by Rodrick Dantzler in Grand Rapids, Michigan.
- July 8 – STS-135: In an added flight, Space Shuttle Atlantis of the U.S. Space Shuttle program is launched for its final time. This is also the final launch for the entire NASA Space Shuttle program.
- July 12
  - A three judge panel of the U.S. 9th Circuit Court of Appeals rules that Jared Lee Loughner, the suspect in the 2011 Tucson shooting, has the right to refuse antipsychotic medication while he appeals the treatment prescribed by prison mental health authorities.
  - CNN reports that the U.S. Bureau of Alcohol, Tobacco, Firearms, and Explosives has lost track of 1,400 guns involved in Operation Fast and Furious aimed at tracing the flow of weapons to Mexican drug cartels.
  - The United States Coast Guard ends aerial searches for seven Americans still missing after a charter fishing boat sank in the Gulf of California off Mexico on July 3.
- July 14
  - U.S. district court judge Reggie Walton declares a mistrial in the perjury trial of former baseball star Roger Clemens after prosecutors present evidence that Walton had previously ruled inadmissible. Walton will hold a hearing on September 2 to determine whether to hold a new trial.
  - News International phone hacking scandal: The FBI is investigating reports that News Corporation sought to hack the phones of victims of the September 11 terrorist attacks.
  - Borders, the once-major bookstore chain now in chapter 11 bankruptcy in the United States, says that its arrangement with stalking horse bidder Najafi Companies has collapsed and it will seek a modification of bid procedures.
- July 15
  - The Dawn spacecraft arrives and settles into its one-year orbit around the minor planet 4 Vesta.
  - Walt Disney Animation Studios' 51st feature film, Winnie the Pooh, is released in theaters. A revival of the studio's Winnie the Pooh franchise, it is met with strongly positive reception but middling box office performance. To date, it is Disney's most recent traditionally-animated film.
- July 17 – Japan wins the FIFA Women's World Cup 2011 by beating the USA 3–2 in the Penalty Shootout.
- July 18 – The U.S. city of Phoenix, Arizona, is hit by a haboob or dust storm.
- July 19
  - Northern Mariana Islands Governor Benigno Fitial and Guam Governor Eddie Calvo state that they are in serious talks to potentially merge the U.S. territories of Guam and the Northern Mariana Islands.
  - Sixteen alleged members of the computer hacking group Anonymous are arrested in FBI raids across several states in the US.
  - The Federal Bureau of Investigation (FBI) arrests an alleged agent of Pakistan's Inter-Services Intelligence in the US state of Virginia for making illegal campaign contributions.
- July 21
  - Two dozen people die throughout the week in a heat wave in the United States.
  - STS-135: Space Shuttle Atlantis touches down at the Shuttle Landing Facility at Kennedy Space Center, ending the 30-year shuttle program, which began with the launch of shuttle Columbia on April 12, 1981.
  - Minnesota governor Mark Dayton signs a budget agreement with Republicans in the Minnesota Legislature, ending a 20-day government shutdown.
- July 22 – Captain America: The First Avenger, directed by Joe Johnston, is released by Marvel Studios as the fifth film of the Marvel Cinematic Universe (MCU). It is the final MCU film to be distributed by Paramount Pictures.
- July 23 – Nearly 4,000 employees of the US Federal Aviation Administration are furloughed due to Congressional authorization for its programs lapsing.
- July 24 – Democratic Party leaders call for the United States House Committee on Ethics to investigate claims that Rep David Wu of Oregon had sexually assaulted a teenager.
- July 25
  - In American football, the NFL Players Association executive unanimously accepts a 10-year pay deal with team owners in the US National Football League.
  - Nickelodeon launches a block of reruns of its 1990s programming to cater to its twentysomething viewers. Dubbed The '90s Are All That, the block airs on its older-skewing sister channel, TeenNick.
- July 26
  - The United States Post Office closure list is sent. Some 3,653 post offices were reviewed for possible closure.
  - David Wu resigns as a member of the United States House of Representatives following allegations of an unwanted sexual encounter with an 18-year-old.
- July 27
  - Maria Ridulph: a 7-year-old 1957 murder victim is exhumed.
  - The United States Senate, in an exception to the 10-year limit, extends the term of the current FBI director, Robert Mueller.

=== August ===
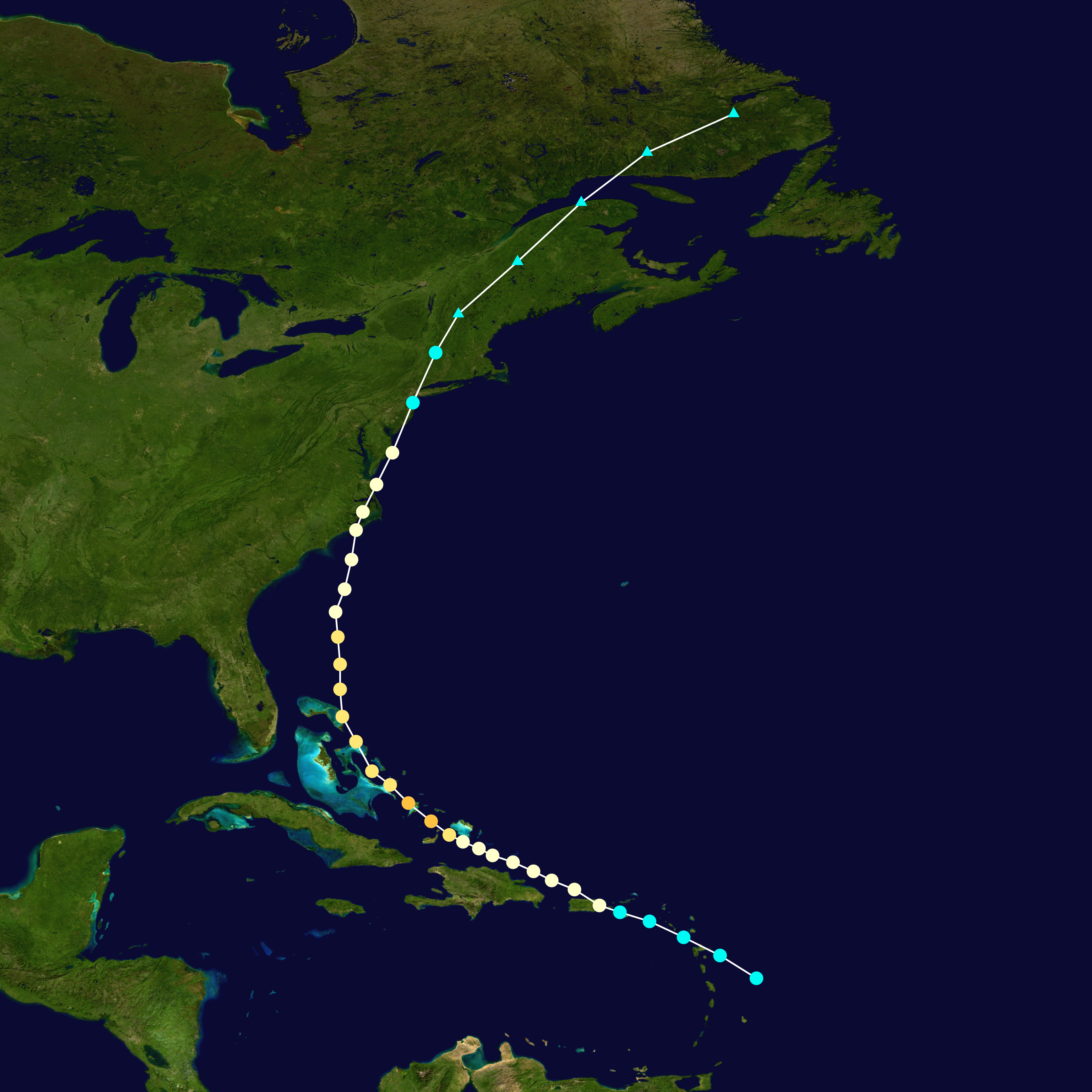
August 28: Hurricane Irene

- August 1 – The United States Congress votes on a deal to resolve the United States debt-ceiling crisis with the House of Representatives passing it. U.S. Rep. Gabby Giffords (D-Arizona) casts her first vote since her traumatic brain injury at the hands of a deranged assassin.
- August 2 – The United States Senate passes legislation to raise the debt ceiling in order to avert the 2011 US debt ceiling crisis and President Barack Obama signs it into law; it thus became the Budget Control Act of 2011.
- August 3 – It is announced that Jerry Lewis would no longer host any further MDA telethons. Earlier this year, it was announced that Lewis was no longer the national chairman of the MDA.
- August 4
  - Kraft Foods announces that it will split into two operations consisting of its North American grocery business and its global snack foods business.
  - United States debt-ceiling crisis: The Dow Jones Industrial Average plunges 512 points (−4.3%) on economic worries, becoming the worst day for stocks since December 2008 and, at this time, the 9th largest drop in United States history (See August 8).
- August 5
  - NASA's Juno Spacecraft launches to Jupiter. The orbital insertion will occur in August 2016.
  - United States debt-ceiling crisis: After the U.S. trading markets close for the weekend, the Standard & Poor's credit rating agency downgrades the credit rating of the United States from AAA to AA+ with a negative outlook. This was the first downgrade of the US credit rating since it was first issued in 1917. Barack Obama's administration had told Standard and Poor's they made a nearly 2 trillion dollar error in their calculations. S&P acknowledged the error, but proceeded with the downgrade anyway.
- August 6
  - A NATO Chinook helicopter crashes in the Sayd Abad district of Afghanistan's Wardak Province after being shot down using rocket-propelled grenade by the Taliban with 38 deaths. At least 20 of the U.S. Navy SEALs killed in the attack were members of SEAL Team Six, the unit that carried out the operation that killed Osama Bin Laden. The Associated Press and CNN later reported that none of the unit members that participated in the raid were involved. This was the single deadliest day for US troops since the Afghanistan War began in 2001.
  - The computer hacking group Anonymous attacks 70 mostly rural law enforcement websites in the United States. Many of the sheriff's offices outsourced their websites to the media hosting company, Brooks-Jeffrey Marketing. If Brooks-Jeffrey's had been breached, hackers would have access to every website that the company hosted.
- August 7 – Ohio man Michael Hance kills seven people before being shot dead by police.
- August 8 – United States debt-ceiling crisis: The Dow Jones Industrial Average plunges another 635 points (−5.6%) in reaction to Standard and Poor's downgrade on August 5. It is the 6th largest drop in United States history and the largest drop since December 2008.
- August 9
  - United States debt-ceiling crisis: The U.S. Federal Reserve announces it will keep interest rates at "exceptionally low levels" at least through mid-2013; but, it also makes no commitment for further quantitative easing. The Dow Jones Industrial Average and the New York Stock Exchange as well as other world stock markets, recover after recent falls.
  - The largest group of simultaneous recall elections in United States history ends with Republicans keeping control of the Wisconsin State Senate, despite Democrats picking up 2 seats.
- August 10
  - New England Journal of Medicine: A therapy destroys leukemia (advanced cases of chronic lymphocytic leukemia, or CLL) in three patients.
  - United States debt-ceiling crisis: Stocks dive again on Europe and economy fears. The Dow Jones Industrial Average fell 519.83 points, or 4.62% to 10719.94, more than wiping out the gains posted in Tuesday's sizable late-day rally. It was the Dow's fourth triple-digit move in five days and brings its declines since its April peak to more than 16%.
- August 12
  - Judge sentences Ohio serial killer Anthony Sowell to death by lethal injection – he is believed to be responsible for 11 murders.
  - United States Post Office considering budget cuts of cutting as many as 120,000 jobs.
- August 13
  - Ames Straw Poll: Republican candidates for the party's nomination in the 2012 presidential election face off in the informal Iowa contest. Congresswoman Michele Bachmann of Minnesota finishes first place, ahead of runner-up Rep. Ron Paul of Texas and former governor of Minnesota Tim Pawlenty, who comes in third.
  - Seven people are killed and 45 are injured when the main stage collapses at the Indiana State Fair in Indianapolis. The tragedy occurred in part from a hurricane-force wind gust ahead of an approaching severe thunderstorm. The scheduled event was to be a performance by the band Sugarland.
- August 14 – The 2011 PGA Championship, played at the Atlanta Athletic Club, is won by American professional golfer, Keegan Bradley, defeating Jason Dufner in a playoff.
- August 15 – Google announces a proposed acquisition of Motorola Mobility.
- August 17 – University of Miami football scandal: NCAA investigating claims by a former booster, Nevin Shapiro, who claims that he provided players with prostitutes, cars and other gifts over the past decade.
- August 19
  - U.S. president Obama provides temporary relief for illegal immigrants who are students, veterans, the elderly, crime victims and those with family, including same-sex partners, as part of immigration reform in the United States.
  - Hewlett-Packard shares drop 20% on news that the company plans to spin-out its personal computer division into a separate company.
  - Doctor Tyron Reece, who wrote nearly a million prescriptions for the painkiller hydrocodone in 2010, is being charged with assisting a Mexican prescription drug smuggling ring.
- August 20 – Striking Verizon union workers will return to work starting August 22, 2011, though their contract dispute isn't resolved.
- August 23 – A rare Eastern-seaboard earthquake of magnitude 5.8 strikes Virginia. The Virginia Seismic Zone's faults ruptured, resulting in activity being felt in Washington, D.C., New York City and other cities.
- August 24
  - A Russian Progress resupply vehicle that was destined for the International Space Station experienced a catastrophic engine failure. The unmanned craft failed to reach orbit and impacted in the Altai Republic.
  - The ailing head of Apple Inc., Steve Jobs resigns.
- August 26 – The filming of government officials while on duty is protected by the First Amendment, said the United States First Circuit Court.
- August 28 – Hurricane Irene: A rare hurricane drives North up the mid-Atlantic and Northeast coast. Nine million homes lose power. Total Caribbean and U.S. fatalities and flooding damage are 55 dead and US$10 billion, respectively. The New England state of Vermont suffers its worst flooding in 100 years.
- August 30 – While reportedly on his way to surrender to police in the US city of Atlanta to face murder charges, former National Basketball Association player Javaris Crittenton is arrested by the FBI at John Wayne Airport in Orange County, California.
- August 31
  - Solyndra, a California solar panel company declares bankruptcy. Only 2 years earlier, Solyndra had received over $500 million from the federal government as requested by the Obama administration.
  - The United States Department of Justice files a lawsuit in an attempt to stop the $39 billion merger between cell phone giants AT&T and T-Mobile.

=== September ===
- September 1 – Tropical Storm Lee: With memories of Hurricane Katrina, a Gulf of Texas storm lands on New Orleans. After a storm track footprint into the Southeastern states, there are a total of 21 fatalities.
- September 2 – An audit report from the United States Treasury Inspector General for Tax Administration found that last year illegal aliens fraudulently collected $4.2 billion from the Additional Child Tax Credit, a refundable credit meant for working families. The audit found that the means for the crime was as a result of vague U.S. law.
- September 3 – A 47-year-old North Carolina man is convicted of eight counts of second-degree murder in the shooting deaths at a nursing home on March 29, 2009 – the type of conviction means that he will not be eligible for the death penalty.
- September 5
  - Wildfires rage across Texas. A fire near Bastrop, Texas burns 1,500 homes and 34,000 acres (140 km^{2}), breaking the record for most homes destroyed in a single fire in Texas history.
  - The new format, prime-time Muscular Dystrophy Association Telethons begin without Jerry Lewis the first telethon not to feature him. In six hours, the organization, which leads the fight against progressive muscle diseases, broadcast its 46th annual MDA Labor Day Telethon. The 2011 telethon raised $61,491,393 — up from the $58,919,838 achieved during the prior year's 21½-hour telethon.
- September 6 – Gunman Eduardo Sencion opens fire in an IHOP in Carson City, Nevada, killing three members of National Guard and one civilian before committing suicide.
- September 8 – U.S. president Barack Obama unveils the American Jobs Act to a joint-session of Congress. Critics label it as a "Third stimulus package".
- September 11
  - The 9/11 National Memorial & Museum in New York City opens; the ceremony commemorates the tenth anniversary of the 9/11 attacks.
  - In tennis, Samantha Stosur of Australia wins the Women's Singles in the 2011 US Open defeating Serena Williams of the United States 6–2, 6–3.
- September 12
  - Bank of America announces 30,000 layoffs.
  - In tennis, Novak Djokovic of Serbia wins the Men's Singles at the 2011 US Open defeating Rafael Nadal of Spain 6–2, 6–4, 6–7 (3–7), 6–1.
- September 13
  - In what was called a referendum on U.S. president Barack Obama, Republican Bob Turner defeats Democrat David Weprin in a special election for New York's 9th congressional district, the seat held previously by Anthony Weiner until he resigned amid a sexting scandal. Turner is the first Republican to represent this district in 88 years.
  - The Fall television season officially kicks off with the first new show, Ringer.
- September 14
  - In a court case concerning the theft of Kevlar-related trade secrets, DuPont is awarded US$920 million in damages.
  - NASA announces plans for a Space Launch System to replace the Space Shuttle program with the first flight tentatively scheduled for 2017.
- September 15
  - The House passes a bill that would severely limit the power of the National Labor Relations Board with a vote of 238–186. The NLRB had recently come under fire from Republicans for trying to prevent Boeing from opening a new 787 Dreamliner production facility in South Carolina with non-union workers instead of in Washington state.
  - Criminal questions arise over a United States Air Force general being pressured by the Obama administration to approve a plan by telecom company LightSquared to develop a nationwide satellite phone network. The company has backing by Democratic donors. LightSquared technology may be a threat to Global Positioning System guidance of U. S. missiles and airline Air traffic control systems.
  - Walter Reed Army Medical Center closes. (it was merged into Walter Reed National Military Medical Center in Bethesda, Maryland)
- September 16 – 2011 Reno Air Races crash: There are 11 dead and at least 75 injured, 25 critically, when a P-51D Mustang airplane crashes into the crowd at the annual Reno Air Races in Reno, Nevada.
- September 17 – Occupy Wall Street: Thousands march on Wall Street in response to high unemployment, record executive bonuses and extensive bailouts of the financial system.
- September 18 – The 63rd Primetime Emmy Awards for television programs broadcast in the United States are held in Los Angeles with Mad Men winning the outstanding drama series and Modern Family winning the Outstanding Comedy.
- September 20 – The United States military officially ends its policy of Don't ask, don't tell allowing gay and lesbian personal to publicly declare their sexual orientation.
- September 22 – The Federal Bureau of Investigation arrests suspected members of the computer hacking groups LulzSec and Anonymous in the US cities of Phoenix, Arizona and San Francisco, California.
- September 23
  - 2011 NBA lockout: The ongoing labor dispute forces the NBA to cancel the first 43 preseason games of the 2011–12 NBA season.
  - The Dow Jones Industrial Average has its worst week in nearly 3 years, falling 6.41% as new recession fears grow.
- September 27 – Andy Rooney announces his retirement from 60 Minutes after 33 years of providing commentary.
- September 28 – The United States Centers for Disease Control and Prevention links an outbreak of listeriosis that has caused 23 deaths and 116 illnesses in 25 states to infected cantaloupes from Colorado.
- September 30
  - After a manhunt that lasted more than two years, during a U.S. military operation in northern Yemen's al-Jawf province, American drones carried out a targeted killing of al-Qaida's leader in the Arabian Peninsula Anwar al-Awlaki while he traveled in a convoy together with his senior aides.
  - Jessie debuts on Disney Channel.

=== October ===
- October 1 – 700 people are arrested while attempting to cross the Brooklyn Bridge during the Occupy Wall Street movement.
- October 3
  - Amanda Knox is released from Italian prison following a successful appeal of her murder conviction.
  - The U.S. Supreme Court announces that it won't hear a much-noted dispute on the width of the "first sale" doctrine in copyright law. The Supreme Court denied Vernor's petition for certiorari – the action affirms the lower court of the United States Court of Appeals for the Ninth Circuit which held that when the transfer of software to the purchaser materially resembled a sale it was, in fact, not a "sale with restrictions on use", giving rise to no right to resell the copy under the first-sale doctrine. As such, Autodesk could pursue an action for copyright infringement against Vernor, who sought to resell used versions of its software on eBay. The Ninth Circuit's decision means that the policy considerations involved in the case might affect motion pictures and libraries as well as sales of used software. The net effect of the Ninth Circuit's ruling (and now the Supreme Court's) is to limit the "You bought it, you own it" principle asserted by such organizations who would like to resell items.
  - American cell phone service provider Sprint Nextel reportedly pays $20 billion for rights to Apple's next mobile phone.
- October 4
  - In basketball, the North American National Basketball Association cancels the remainder of the preseason due to the 2011 NBA lockout, with cancellation of games in the regular season occurring if the lockout continues for another week.
  - Voters in the U.S. state of West Virginia go to the polls for a gubernatorial special election with acting governor, Democrat Earl Ray Tomblin, being elected as Governor of West Virginia.

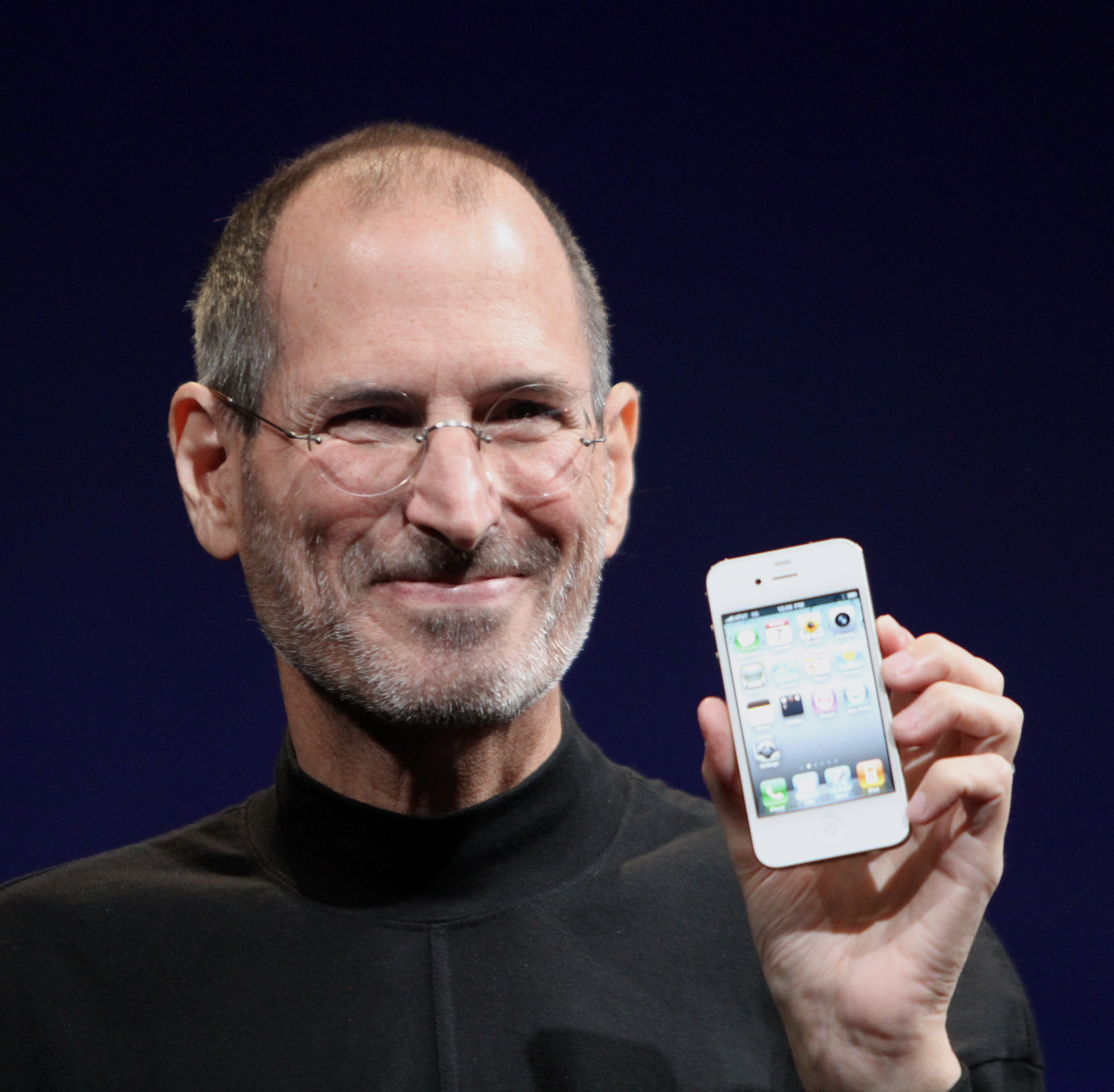
October 5: Death of American computer entrepreneur and inventor Steve Jobs

- October 5 – Steve Jobs dies at the age of 56. He was an American computer engineer, who co-founded in 1976 Apple Inc., a technology company, which at many times has been the largest company in the world.
- October 7 – The NYPD busts a Queens-based identity theft and retail crime ring, arresting over 110 people. It was the largest identity theft ring in the history of the United States, making an annual profit of over $13 million.
- October 11
  - The United States Senate passes economic sanctions on China due to so called low manipulation of the yuan.
  - The United States Senate rejects the American Jobs Act in a procedural vote.
- October 12 – Scott Dekraai opens fire in a hair salon in Seal Beach, California, killing eight, including his ex-wife. He is later arrested.
- October 14 – The United States under President Barack Obama deployed 100 troops in Uganda to assist in the capture of Lord's Resistance Army leader Joseph Kony in the current insurgency.
- October 16 – British auto racing driver Dan Wheldon dies in a 15-car pileup while participating in the final race of the 2011 IndyCar season at Las Vegas Motor Speedway.
- October 22 – Republican governor Bobby Jindal wins a second term as Governor of Louisiana.
- October 28 – The St. Louis Cardinals defeat the Texas Rangers in seven games to win their 11th world series.

=== November ===
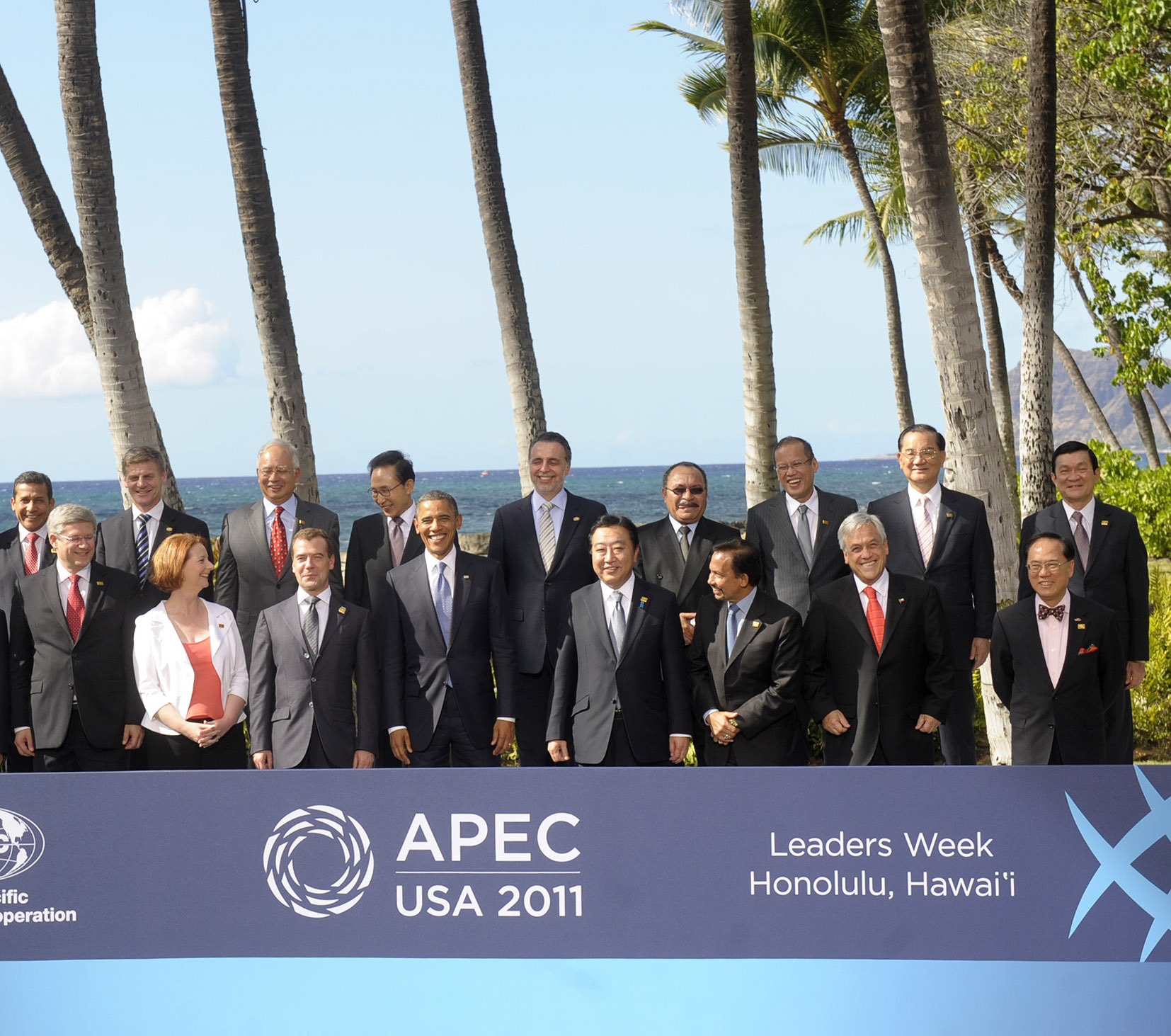
November 11: U.S. President Obama and Asia-Pacific leaders at the APEC United States Delegates in Honolulu, Hawaii, on November 11, 2011.

- November 4 – After announcing his retirement on September 27, Andy Rooney dies aged 92.
- November 7 – Jerry Sandusky, a former assistant coach for the Penn State University football team, is arrested on nearly 40 counts of molesting eight boys over a 15-year period. The charges come following a grand jury investigation, which also alleges attempts to cover up the incidents and failure to report the incidents to law enforcement. In the days following the report, longtime coach Joe Paterno and university president Graham Spanier (already heavily criticized for alleged inaction) are fired.
- November 8 – Election Day
  - Republican Phil Bryant wins the 2011 Mississippi Gubernatorial election.
  - Voters in Mississippi reject a life-at-conception proposal.
  - Incumbent Democrat Steve Beshear wins the 2011 Kentucky Gubernatorial election.
  - Republicans gain control of the Virginia Senate, with Republican Lieutenant Governor of Virginia Bill Bolling breaking all tie votes.
  - Arizona Senate majority leader Russell Pearce is recalled from office.
  - Voters in Ohio reject a law that would ban collective bargaining for government employees.
- November 11 – U.S. president Barack Obama arrives in Honolulu, Hawaii with Asia-Pacific leaders to attends the APEC Summit.
- November 14 – The United States Supreme Court announces it will make its ruling on the constitutionality of the Patient Protection and Affordable Care Act sometime in 2012.
- November 18 – Mojang Studios officially releases Minecraft to the general public.
- November 21 – The US national debt tops the United States's GDP for the first time since the late 1940s.
- November 26 – NASA's Mars Science Laboratory launches with the Curiosity rover. The scheduled landing date is August 6, 2012.
- November 29 – AMR Corporation, the parent company of American Airlines announces a sudden bankruptcy. The company's stock plunges 84% on the news.

=== December ===
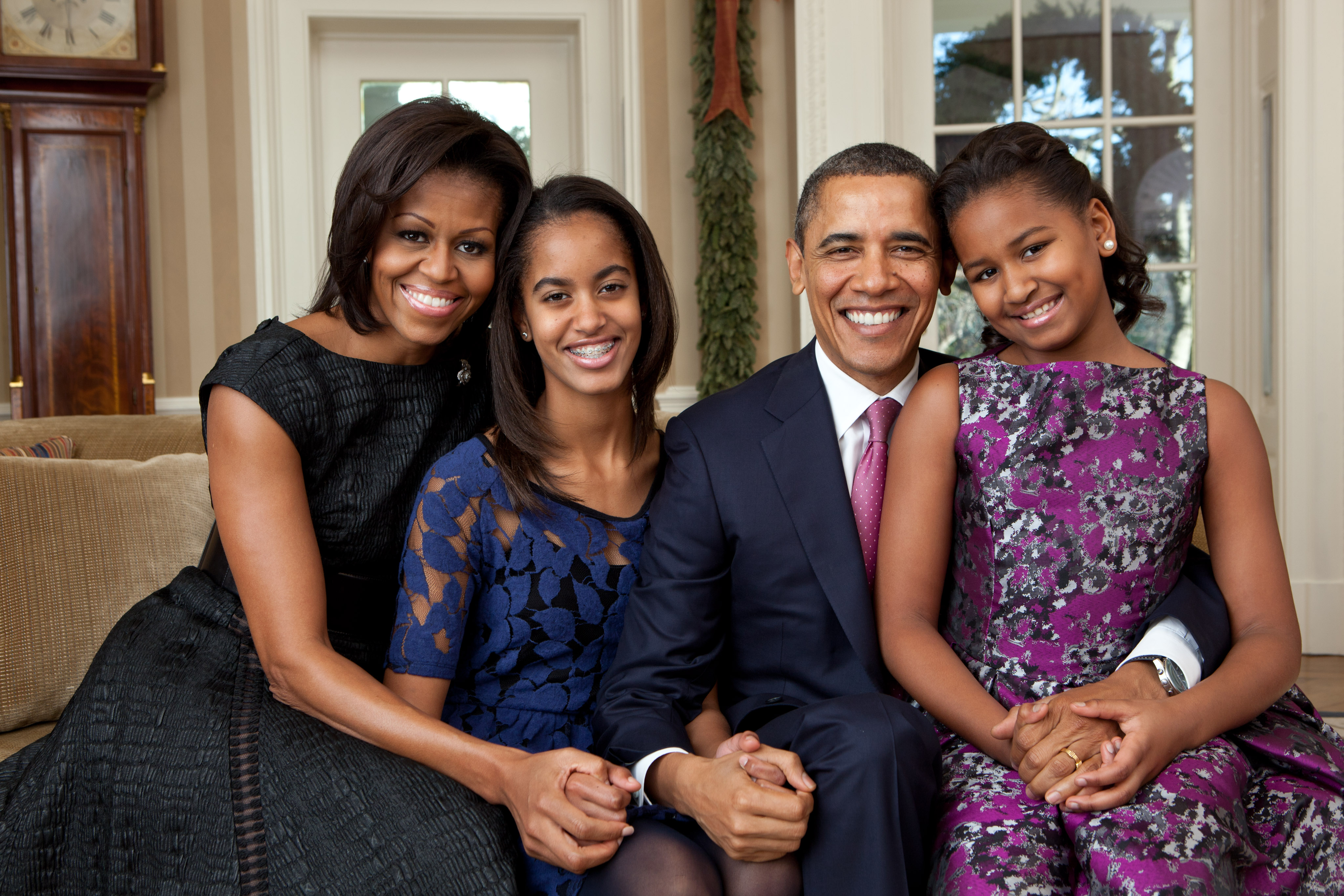
December 11: U.S. President Obama's family at the Oval Office in the White House, before the Christmas Day.

- December 2 – The U.S. unemployment rate falls to 8.6% – the lowest since early 2009.
- December 7 – Former Illinois Governor Rod Blagojevich is sentenced to 14 years in prison for corruption and trying to sell Barack Obama's former Senate seat.
- December 9
  - Republican party nomination hopeful Newt Gingrich fuels controversy by referring to Palestinians as an "invented people".
  - Joshua Komisarjevsky, one of the suspects in the Cheshire, Connecticut home invasion murders, is sentenced to death by lethal injection.
  - SnoBar Cocktails launches a line of alcohol infused ice cream and ice-pops.
- December 10 – Robert Griffin III, the quarterback with the Baylor Bears college football team, wins the Heisman Trophy.
- December 13 – Iran rejects a U.S. request to return an RQ-170 unmanned reconnaissance aircraft that was recently captured by Iranian forces. Iranian officials claimed they used a cyber attack to capture the aircraft and that they are extracting data from it.
- December 15 – Impractical Jokers debuts its first episode on TruTV.
- December 18 – The last American troops are withdrawn from Iraq, ending the Iraq War.
- December 31–January 2 – A string of 52 arson fires are set in the Los Angeles area, causing up to $2 million in damage. A foreign national named Harry Burkhart, reportedly angry at Americans, is arrested for the crimes.

=== Ongoing ===
- War in Afghanistan (2001–2021)
- Iraq War (2003–2011)
- 2010–2012 Southern United States drought

== Births ==
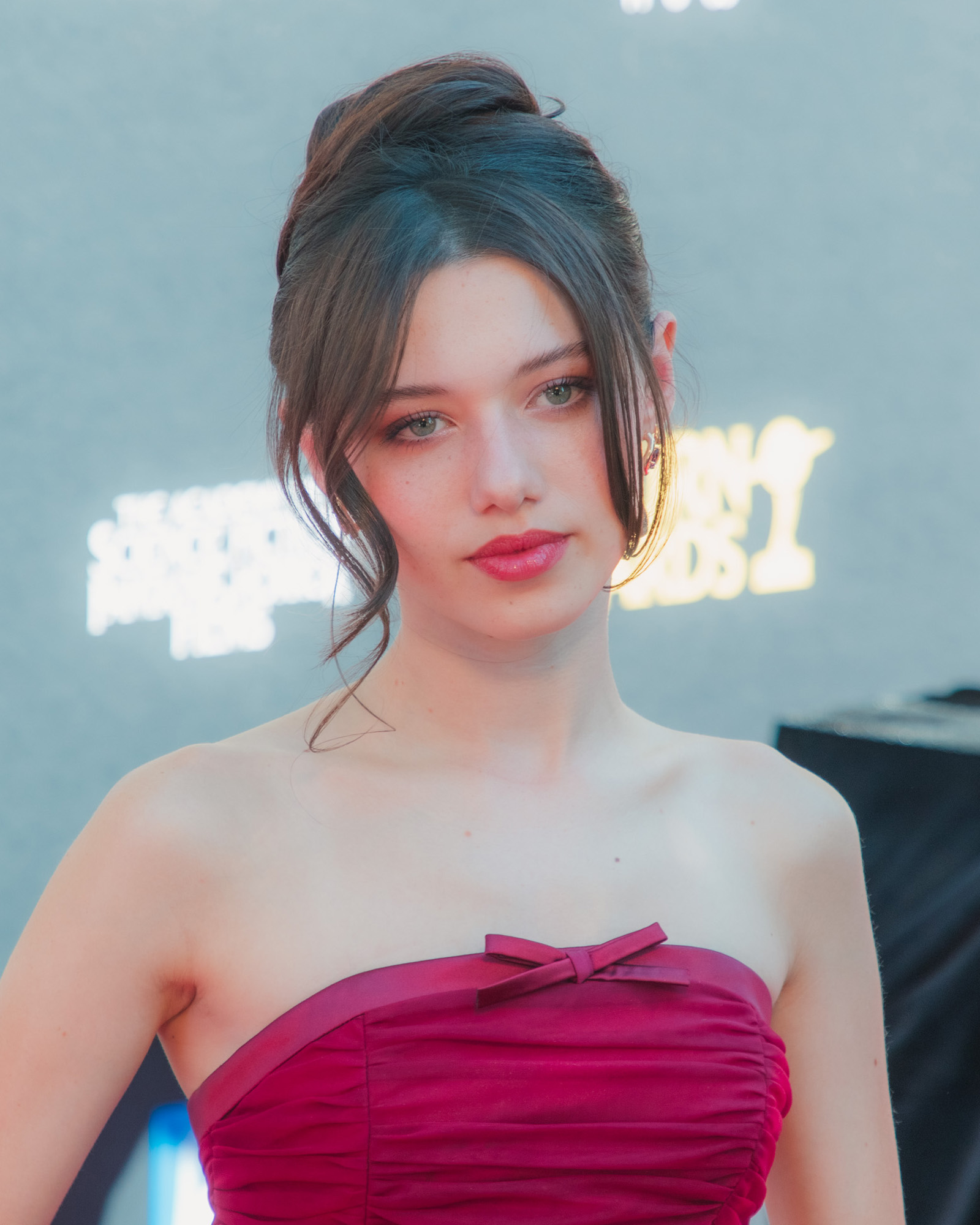
Violet McGraw

- April 22 – Violet McGraw, actress
- August 10 – Jeremy Maguire, actor
- October 6 – Ryan Kaji, YouTube star
- December 27 – Jocelyn Nungaray, murder victim (d. 2024)

== Deaths ==
=== January ===
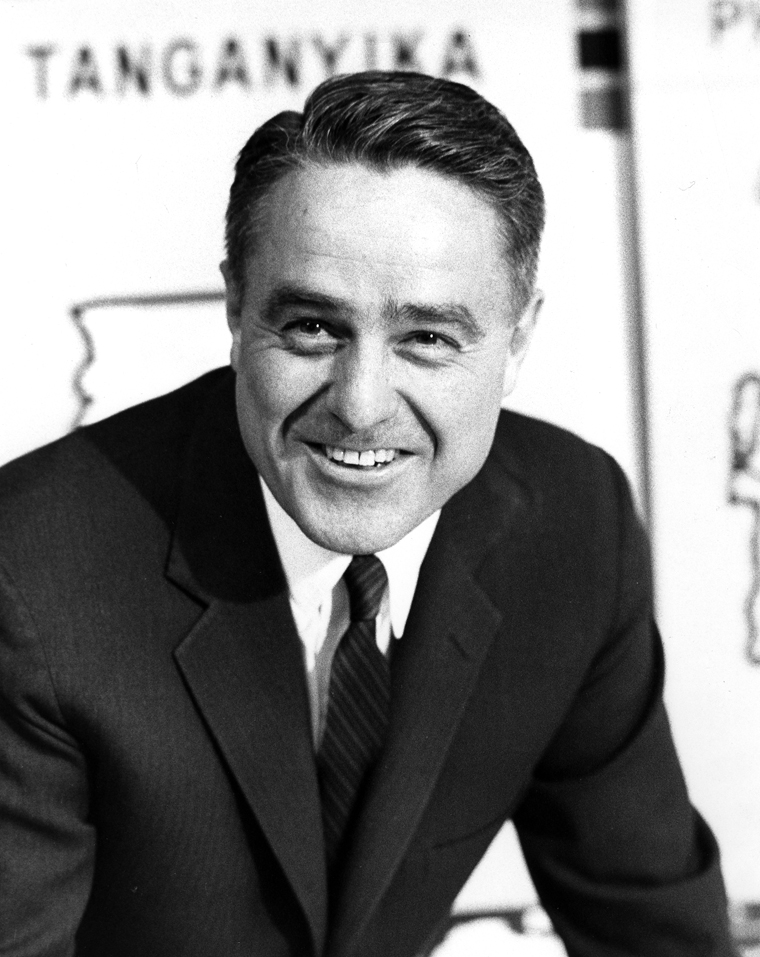
Sargent Shriver

- January 1
  - Charles Fambrough, musician and composer (b. 1950)
  - Billy Joe Patton, amateur golfer (b. 1922)
- January 2
  - William R. Ratchford, U.S. representative from Connecticut from 1979 to 1985 (b. 1934)
  - Anne Francis, actress (b. 1930)
  - Peter Hobbs, French-born American actor (b. 1918)
  - Miriam Seegar, actress (b. 1907)
  - Richard Winters, World War II soldier (b. 1918)
- January 3 – Jill Haworth, English-American actress (b. 1945)
- January 5
  - John Ertle Oliver, geophysicist (b. 1923)
  - Wendell "Bud" Hurlbut, Theme park creator and entrepreneur (b. 1918)
- January 6 – Donald J. Tyson, businessman (b. 1930)
- January 7 – Thomas J. White, construction company executive and philanthropist (b. 1920)
- January 8
  - John Roll, US federal judge and 2011 Tucson shooting victim (b. 1947)
  - Christina-Taylor Green, documentary subject and 2011 Tucson shooting victim (b. 2001)
- January 10
  - John Dye, actor (b. 1963)
  - Margaret Whiting, singer (b. 1924)
- January 11 – David Nelson, actor (b. 1936)
- January 17 – Don Kirshner, music producer, consultant, publisher, and talent manager (b. 1934)
- January 18 – Sargent Shriver, Peace Corps founder (b. 1915)
- January 21 – Dennis Oppenheim, artist (b. 1938)
- January 23 – François Henri "Jack" LaLanne, fitness and dietary health trainer (b. 1914)
- January 24 – Bernd Eichinger, German film producer and director, died in Los Angeles (b. 1949)
- January 25 – Daniel Bell, sociologist (b. 1919)
- January 26
  - Gladys Horton, singer (lead singer and founder of The Marvelettes) (b. 1945)
  - Charlie Louvin, singer and songwriter (b. 1927)
- January 27 – Charlie Callas, comedian and actor (b. 1927)
- January 29 – Milton Babbitt, composer (b. 1916)
- January 30 – John Barry, British film score composer, died in Oyster Bay, New York (b. 1933)
- January 31 – Charles Kaman, aeronautical engineer (b. 1919)

=== February ===
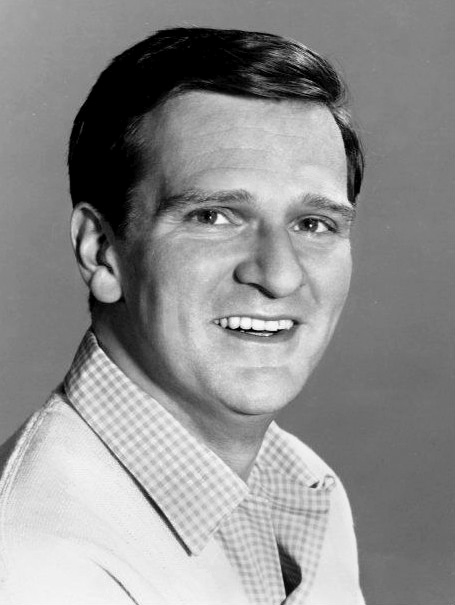
Kenneth Mars

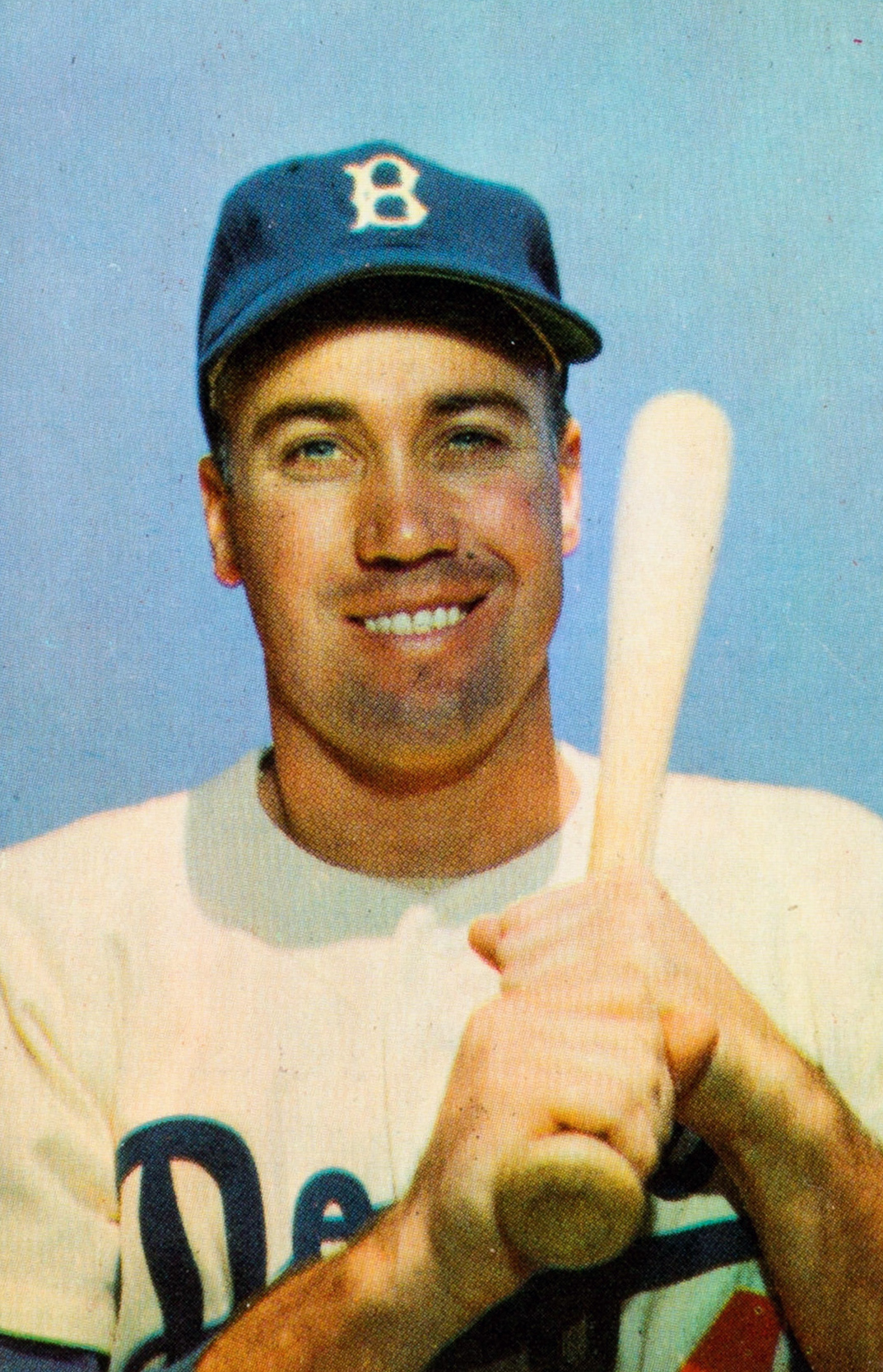
Duke Snider

Jane Russell

- February 3 – LeRoy Grannis, surfing photographer (b. 1917)
- February 4 – Tura Satana, Japanese-born American actress (b. 1938)
- February 5 – Peggy Rea, actress (b. 1921)
- February 6 – Kenneth Harry Olsen, electrical engineer (b. 1926)
- February 7 – Maria Altmann, litigant versus Nazi Austria (b. 1916 in Austria)
- February 8
  - Marvin Sease, singer (b. 1946)
  - Tony Malinosky, baseball player (b. 1909)
- February 10 – Bill Justice, cartoonist (b. 1914)
- February 12
  - Betty Garrett, actress (b. 1919)
  - Kenneth Mars, actor (b. 1935)
- February 14 – George Shearing, pianist (b. 1919)
- February 15 – Charles Epstein, geneticist and Unabomber victim (b. 1933)
- February 16
  - Neal R. Amundson, mathematical modeling in chemical engineering (b. 1916)
  - Leonard King "Len" Lesser, actor (b. 1922)
- February 18
  - Jane Russell, actress (b. 1921)
  - Walter Seltzer, film producer (b. 1914)
- February 19 – Ollie Matson, American football player (b. 1930)
- February 21
  - Edwin D. Kilbourne, physician and vaccine scientist (b. 1920)
  - Dwayne McDuffie, comic book writer, editor and animator (b. 1962)
  - Russell W. Peterson, 66th governor of Delaware from 1969 till 1973. (b. 1916)
  - Haila Stoddard, actress (b. 1913)
  - Judith Sulzberger, physician and newspaper director (b. 1923)
- February 26 – Greg Goossen, baseball player and actor (b. 1945)
- February 27
  - Frank Buckles, soldier, last living U.S. World War I veteran (b. 1901)
  - Eddie Kirkland, musician (b. 1923)
  - Duke Snider, baseball player (b. 1926)
  - Gary Winick, film director (b. 1961)
- February 28
  - Peter J. Gomes, professor and theologian (b. 1942)
  - Nick LaTour, actor (b. 1926)
  - Jane Russell, actress (b. 1921)

=== March ===
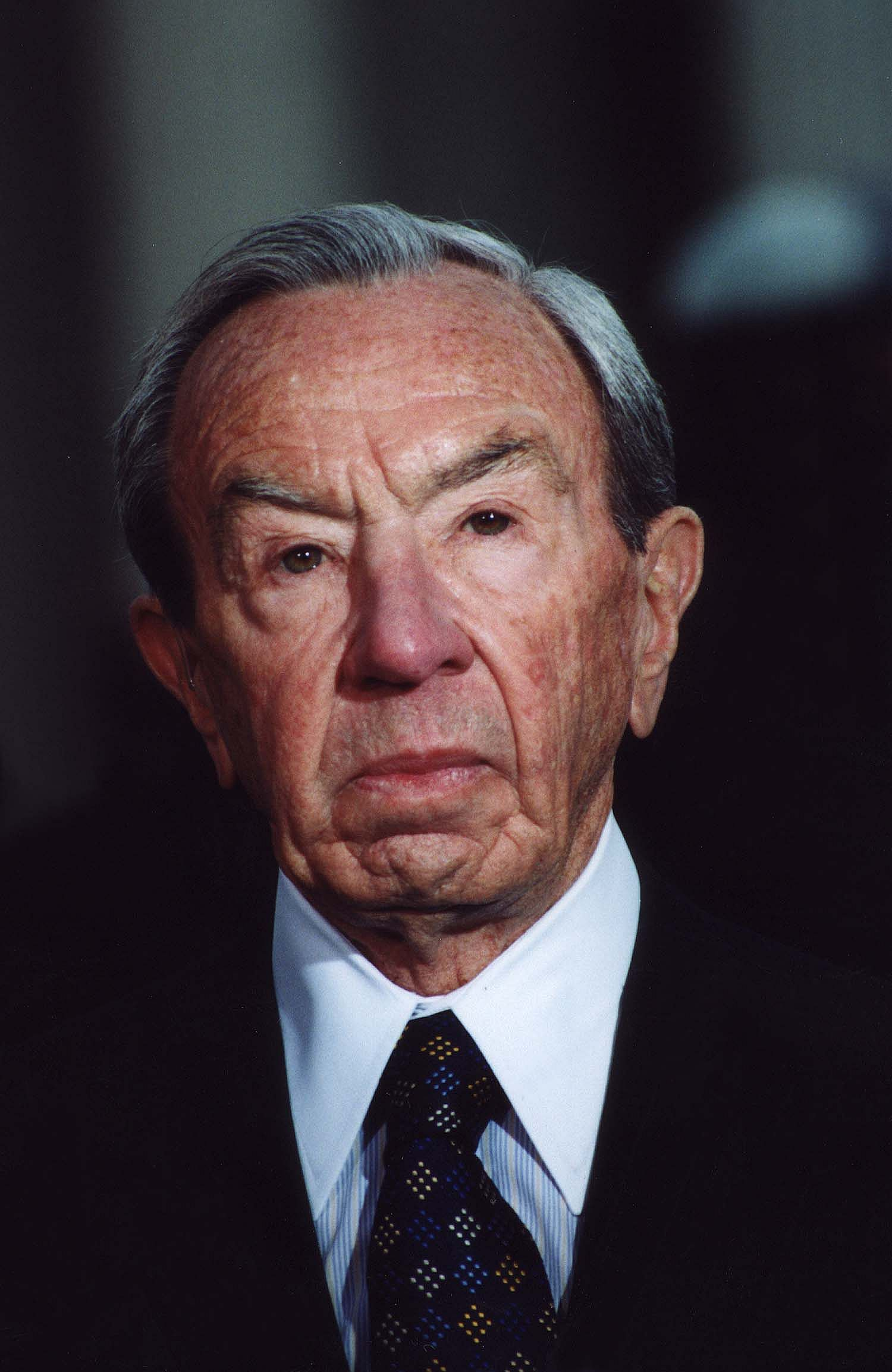
Warren Christopher

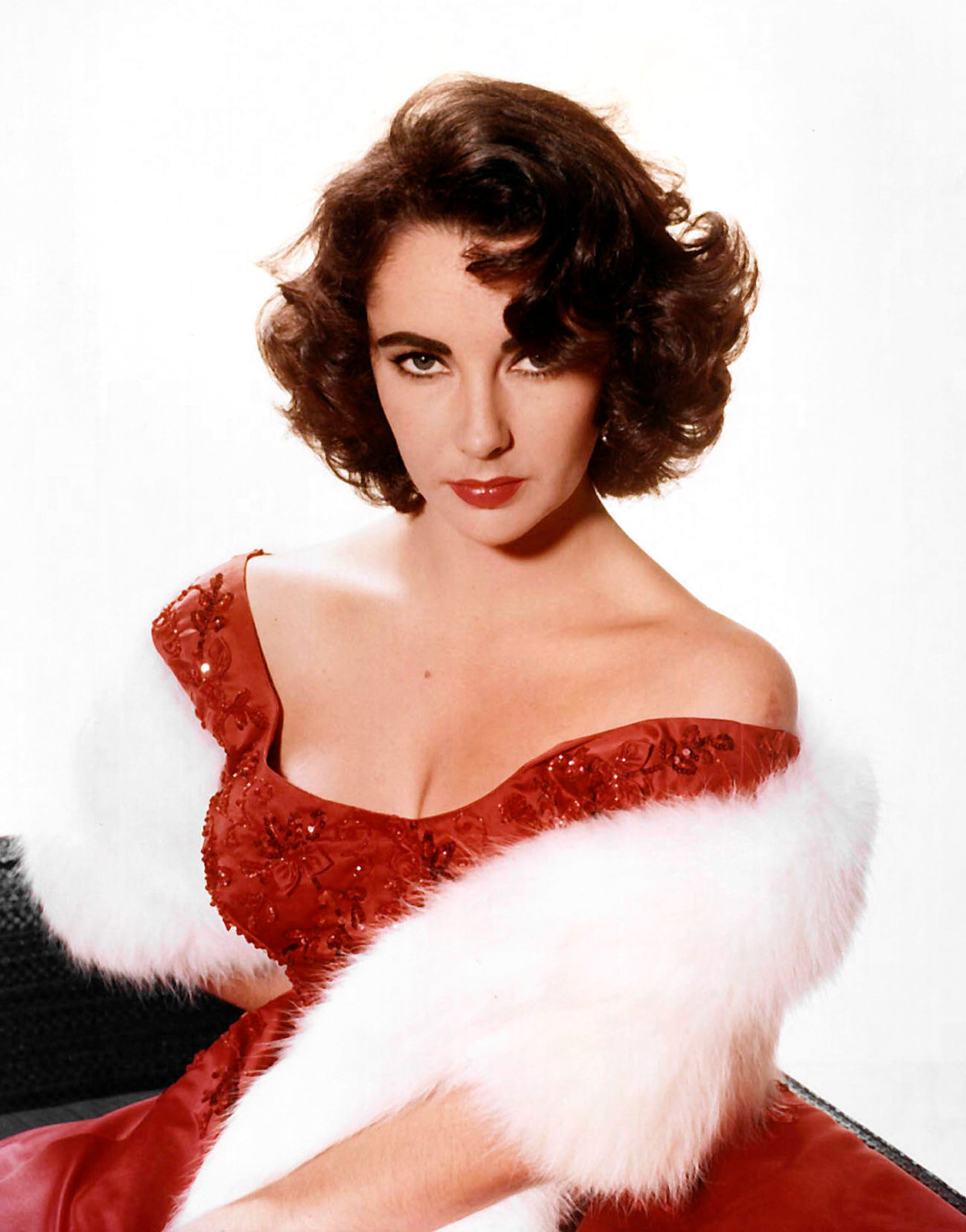
Elizabeth Taylor

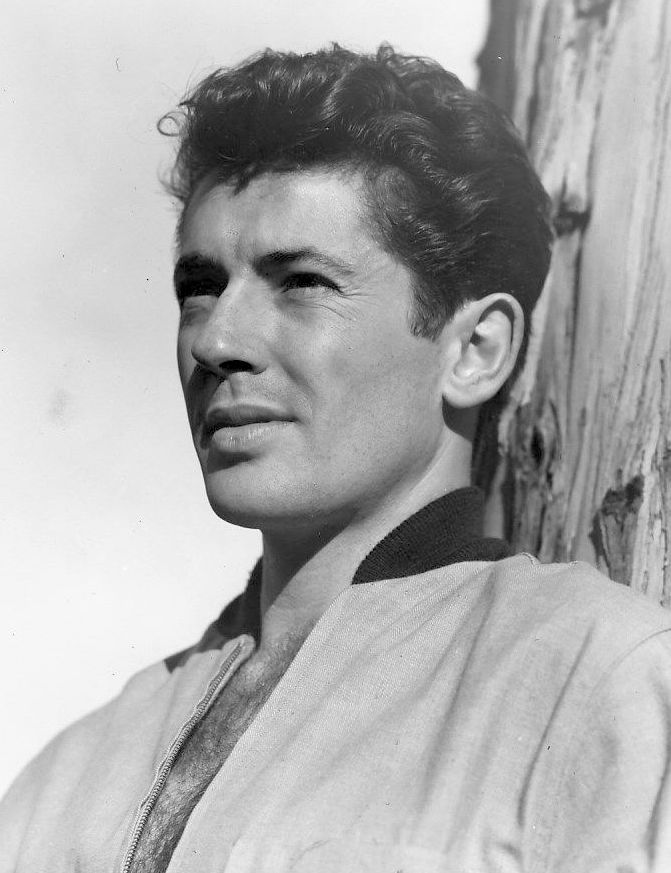
Farley Granger

- March 1
  - Leonard Lomell, soldier (b. 1920)
  - John M. Lounge, astronaut (b. 1946)
- March 4
  - Charles Jarrott, British film director, died in California (b. 1927)
  - Johnny Preston, singer (b. 1939)
- March 6 – Jean Bartel, Miss America Pageant winner and actress (b. 1923)
- March 7 – Samuel Hazard Gillespie Jr., counsel (b. 1910)
- March 8 – Mike Starr, musician (b. 1966)
- March 9 – David S. Broder, journalist (b. 1929)
- March 11 – Hugh Martin, film music composer (b. 1914)
- March 15
  - Nate Dogg, rapper (b. 1969)
  - Marty Marion, baseball player (b. 1917)
- March 17 – Ferlin Husky, singer and musician (b. 1925)
- March 18
  - Warren Christopher, 63rd United States Secretary of State from 1993 till 1997. (b. 1925)
  - Drew Hill, American football player (b. 1956)
- March 19 – Robert Ross, medical school founder (b. 1919)
- March 20 – Dorothy Young, entertainer (b. 1907)
- March 23
  - Jean Bartik, computer engineer (b. 1924)
  - Elizabeth Taylor, British-born American actress (b. 1932)
- March 24 – Lanford Wilson, writer (b. 1937)
- March 25 – Thomas Eisner, biologist, died in Ithaca, New York (b. 1929)
- March 26
  - Paul Baran, internet pioneer, died in Palo Alto, California (b. 1926)
  - Harry Coover, inventor (b. 1917)
  - Geraldine Ferraro, United States Representative from New York from 1979 till 1985. (b. 1935)
- March 27
  - Farley Granger, actor (b. 1925)
  - Dorothea Puente, murderer (b. 1929)
- March 28
  - Lee Hoiby, composer (b. 1926)
  - Guy M. Townsend, Air Force brigadier general and test pilot (b. 1920)
- March 31 – Mel McDaniel, singer-songwriter and musician (b. 1942)

=== April ===
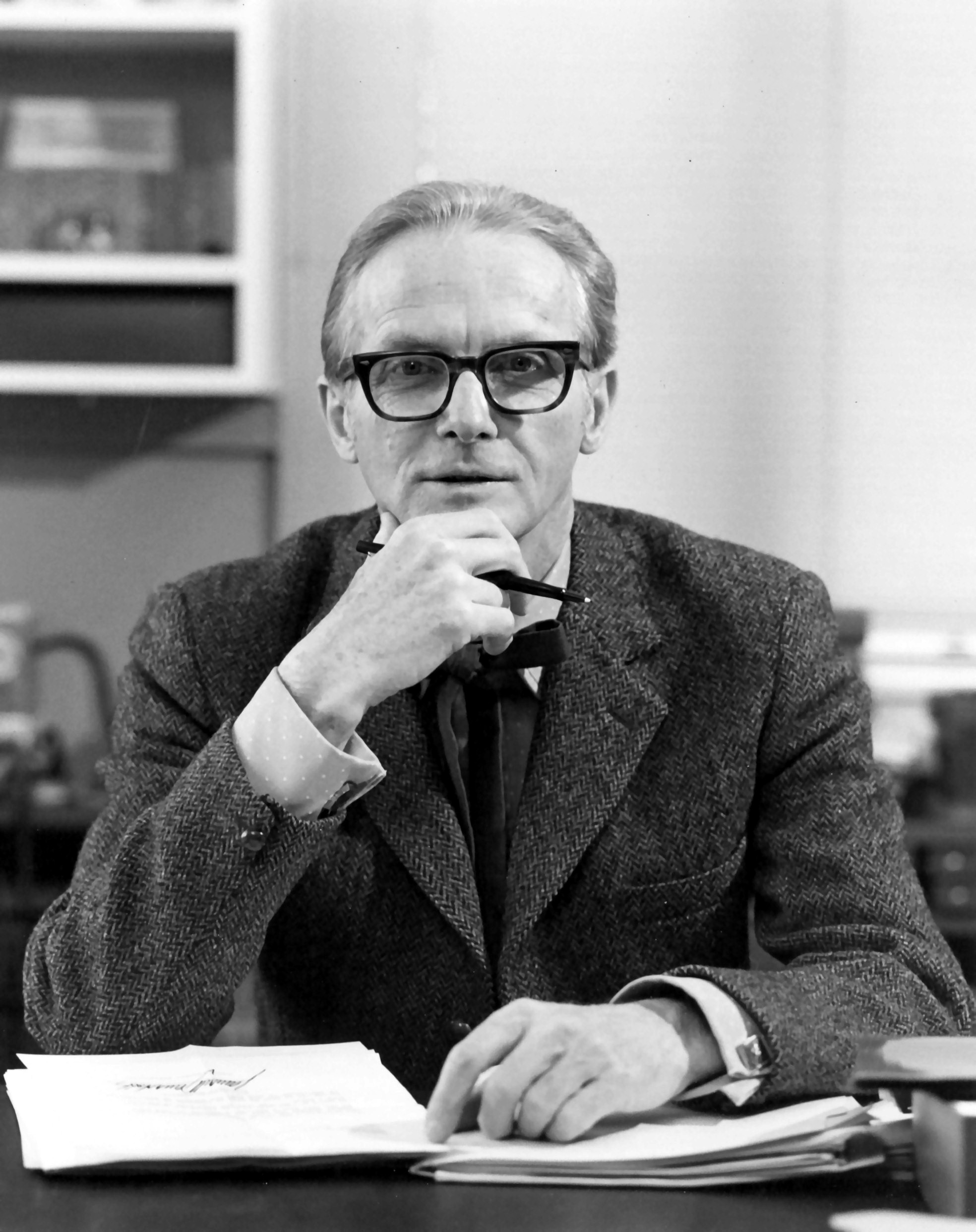
William Lipscomb

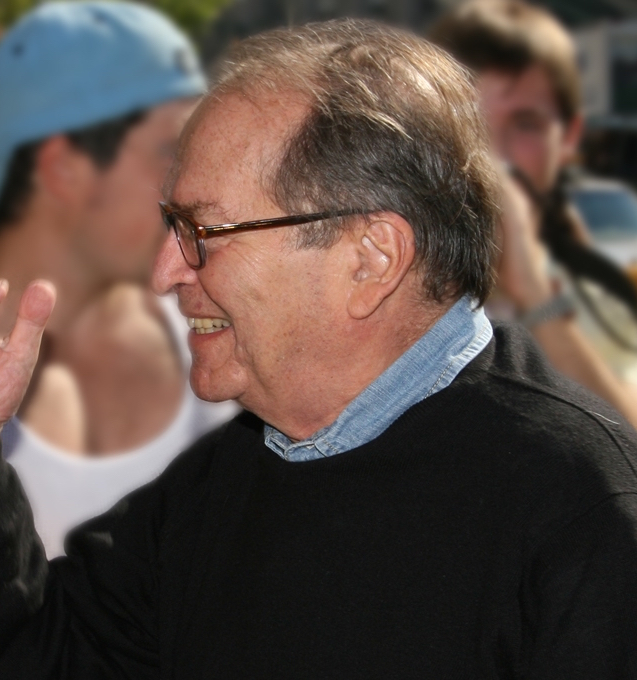
Sidney Lumet

- April 1 – Lou Gorman, baseball manager (b. 1929)
- April 2
  - Larry Finch, college basketball player and coach (b. 1951)
  - John C. Haas, chemical engineer (b. 1918)
  - Bill Varney, film sound editor (b. 1934)
- April 3 – William Prusoff, pharmacologist (b. 1920)
- April 4 – Ned McWherter, 46th governor of Tennessee from 1987 till 1995. (b. 1930)
- April 5
  - Baruch Samuel Blumberg, Nobel physician (b. 1925)
  - Larry Shepard, baseball manager (b. 1919)
- April 6
  - Skip O'Brien, actor (b. 1950)
  - F. Gordon A. Stone, chemist (b. 1925).
- April 7 – Edward Edwards, murderer and one-time member of the FBI's most wanted list (b. 1933)
- April 9
  - Jerry Lawson, video game pioneer (b. 1940)
  - Sidney Lumet, film director (b. 1924)
- April 10 – Homer Smith, American football player and coach (b. 1931)
- April 12
  - Sidney Harman, businessman and publisher (b. 1918)
  - Eddie Joost, baseball player and manager (b. 1916)
- April 14
  - Walter Breuning, current oldest living man and third oldest man ever (b. 1896)
  - Cyrus Harvey Jr., film distributor (b. 1925)
  - William Lipscomb, Nobel chemist (b. 1919)
  - Arthur Marx, writer (b. 1921)
- April 16
  - William A. Rusher, magazine publisher (b. 1923)
  - Sol Saks, television writer (b. 1910)
- April 17 – Joel Colton, historian (b. 1918)
- April 18 – William Donald Schaefer, 58th governor of Maryland from 1987 till 1995. (b. 1921)
- April 19
  - Lynn Chandnois, American football player (b. 1925)
  - Norm Masters, American football player (b. 1933)
- April 20
  - Chris Hondros, photojournalist (b. 1970)
  - Madelyn Pugh, television writer (b. 1921)
  - Gerard Smith, guitarist (b. 1974)
- April 21
  - Harold Garfinkel, sociologist (b. 1917)
  - Max Mathews, electrical engineer (b. 1926)
- April 22 – Merle Greene Robertson, archaeologist (b. 1913)
- April 23 – Phillip Shriver, historian and college president (b. 1922)
- April 25 – Joe Perry, American football player (b. 1927)
- April 26
  - Jim Mandich, American football player (b. 1948)
  - Lynn Hauldren, copywriter, mascot for Empire Today (b. 1926)
  - Phoebe Snow, singer, songwriter, and guitarist (b. 1950)
- April 27 – Marian Mercer, actress (b. 1935)
- April 28 – William Campbell, actor (b. 1926)

=== May ===
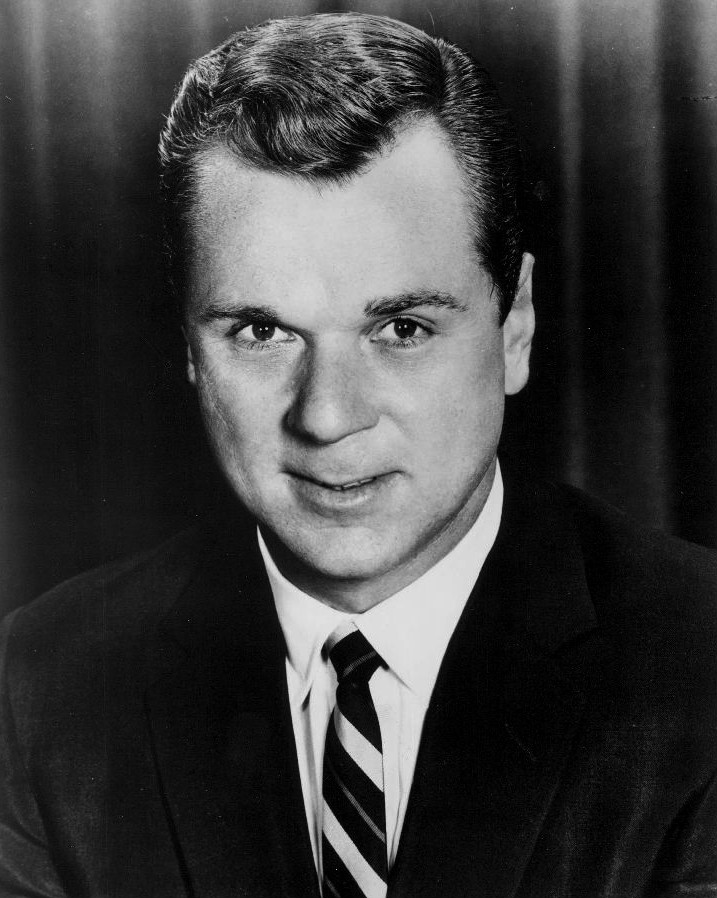
Jackie Cooper

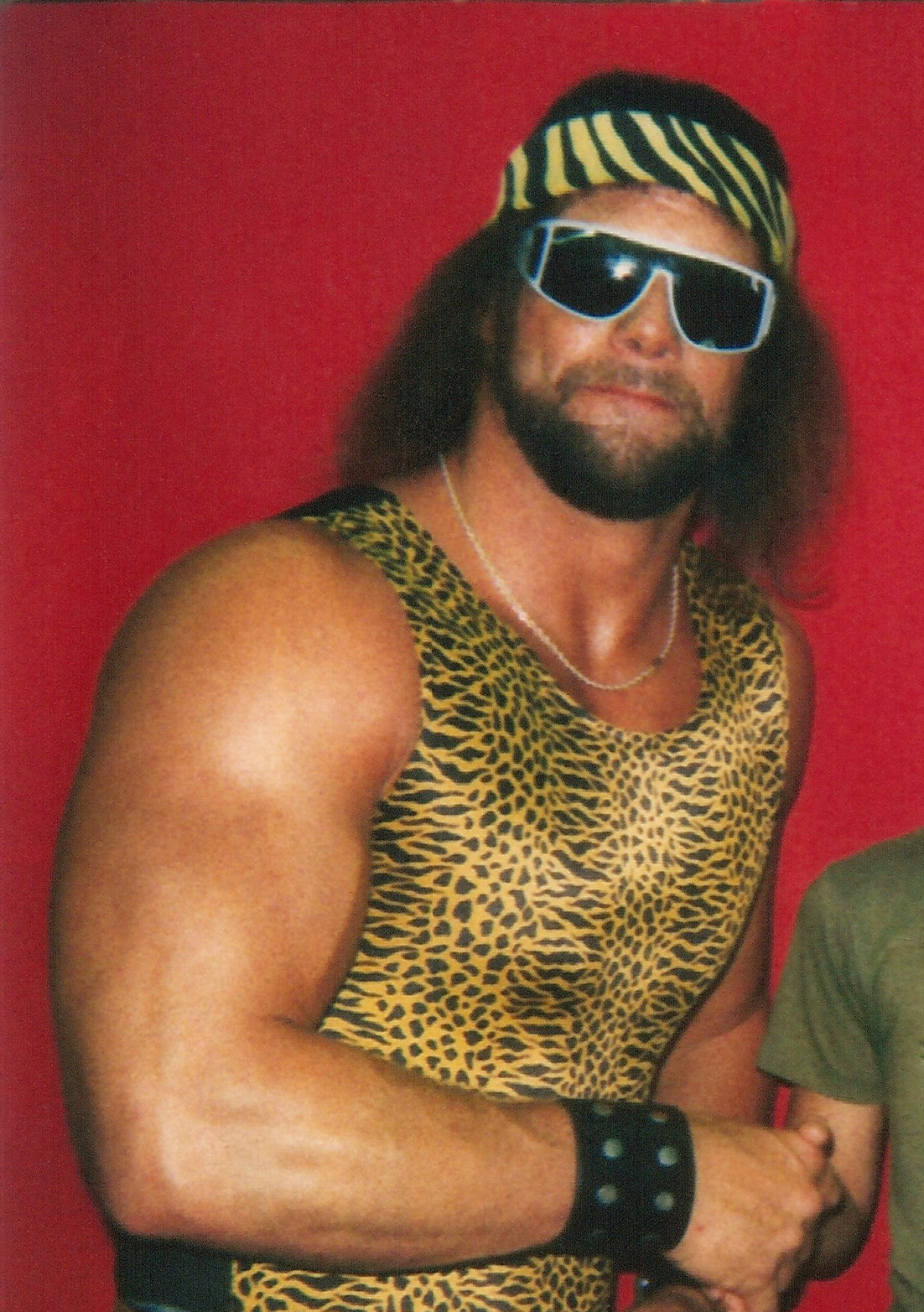
Randy Savage

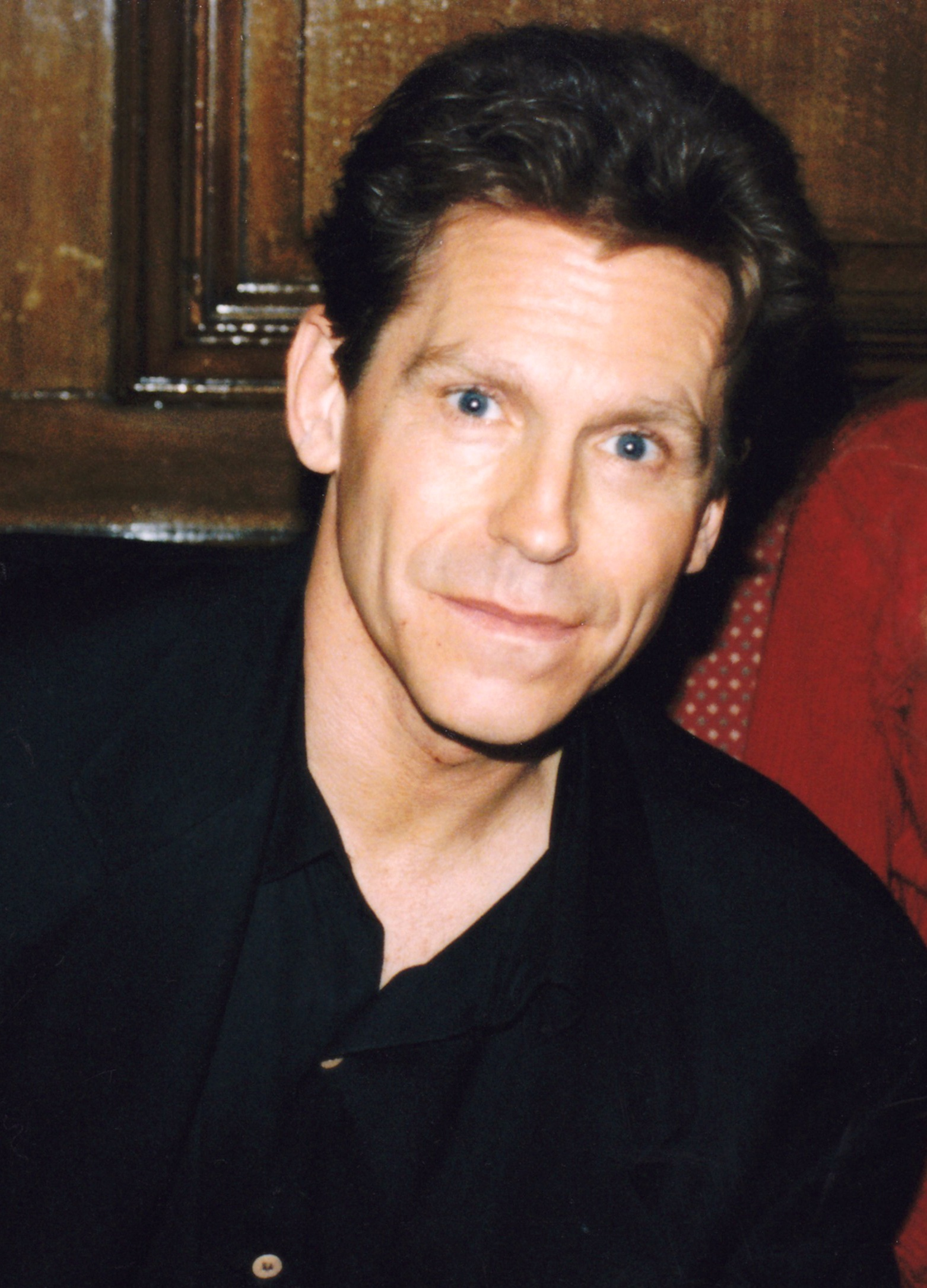
Jeff Conaway

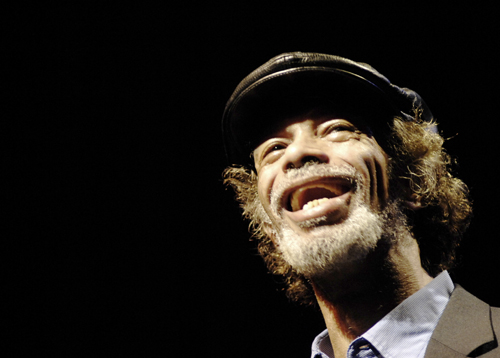
Gil Scott-Heron

- May 1
  - Steven Orszag, mathematician (b. 1943)
  - William O. Taylor II, journalist (b. 1932)
  - J. Ernest Wilkins Jr., nuclear physicist (b. 1923)
- May 2 – David Sencer, physician (b. 1924)
- May 3
  - Robert Brout, American-born Belgian physicist (b. 1928)
  - Jackie Cooper, actor (b. 1922)
  - Dale Martin, politician (b. 1951)
- May 4
  - Mary Murphy, actress (b. 1931)
  - Sada Thompson, actress (b. 1927)
- May 5
  - Arthur Laurents, screenwriter (b. 1917)
  - Dana Wynter, actress, died in Ojai, California (b. 1931)
- May 6
  - Lawrence Johnson, inventor (b. 1913)
  - Horace Freeland Judson, science historian (b. 1931)
  - Dick Walsh, baseball manager (b. 1925)
- May 7
  - Ross Hagen, actor (b. 1938)
  - Robert Stempel, automobile executive (b. 1933)
- May 8 – Corwin Hansch, chemist (b. 1918)
- May 9
  - Henry Feffer, surgeon (b. 1918)
  - Jeff Gralnick, journalist (b. 1939)
- May 10
  - Bill Bergesch, baseball manager (b. 1921)
  - Burt Reinhardt, journalist (b. 1920)
  - Norma Zimmer, musician (b. 1923)
- May 11
  - Maurice Goldhaber, physicist, died in East Setauket, New York (b. 1911 in Austria)
  - Leo Kahn, businessman (b. 1916)
- May 12
  - Charles F. Haas, film and television director (b. 1913)
  - Jack Jones, journalist (b. 1924)
  - Jack Keil Wolf, electrical engineer (b. 1935)
- May 13 – Mel Queen, baseball manager (b. 1942)
- May 14
  - Murray Handwerker, businessman (b. 1921)
  - Joseph Wershba, journalist (b. 1920)
- May 15 – Barbara Stuart, actress (b. 1935)
- May 16 – Douglas Blubaugh, athlete (b. 1934)
- May 17 – Harmon Killebrew, baseball player (b. 1936)
- May 19
  - Phyllis Avery, actress (b. 1924)
  - David H. Kelley, Canadian archaeologist (b. 1924 in the United States)
  - Tom West, computer engineer (b. 1939)
- May 20
  - Steve Rutt, early pioneer of video animation (b. 1945)
  - Randy Savage, wrestler (b. 1952)
- May 22 – Joseph Brooks, songwriter (b. 1938)
- May 23 – Peter Frelinghuysen, Jr., politician (b. 1916)
- May 24 – Mark Haines, lawyer and television news anchor (b. 1946)
- May 25 – Paul J. Wiedorfer, World War II soldier (b. 1921)
- May 26 – Irwin D. Mandel, dentist (b. 1922)
- May 27
  - Jeff Conaway, actor (b. 1950)
  - Gil Scott-Heron, poet and musician (b. 1949)
- May 28
  - Leo Rangell, physician (b. 1913)
  - John H. Sinfelt, chemical engineer (b. 1931)
- May 29 – Bill Clements, 42nd and 44th governor of Texas from 1979 to 1983 and 1987 to 1991 (b. 1917)
- May 30
  - Clarice Taylor, actress (b. 1917)
  - Rosalyn Sussman Yalow, Nobel physicist in medicine (b. 1921)
- May 31
  - Pauline Betz, tennis player (b. 1919)
  - Andy Robustelli, American football player (b. 1925)
  - Philip Rose, stage and film producer (b. 1921)

=== June ===
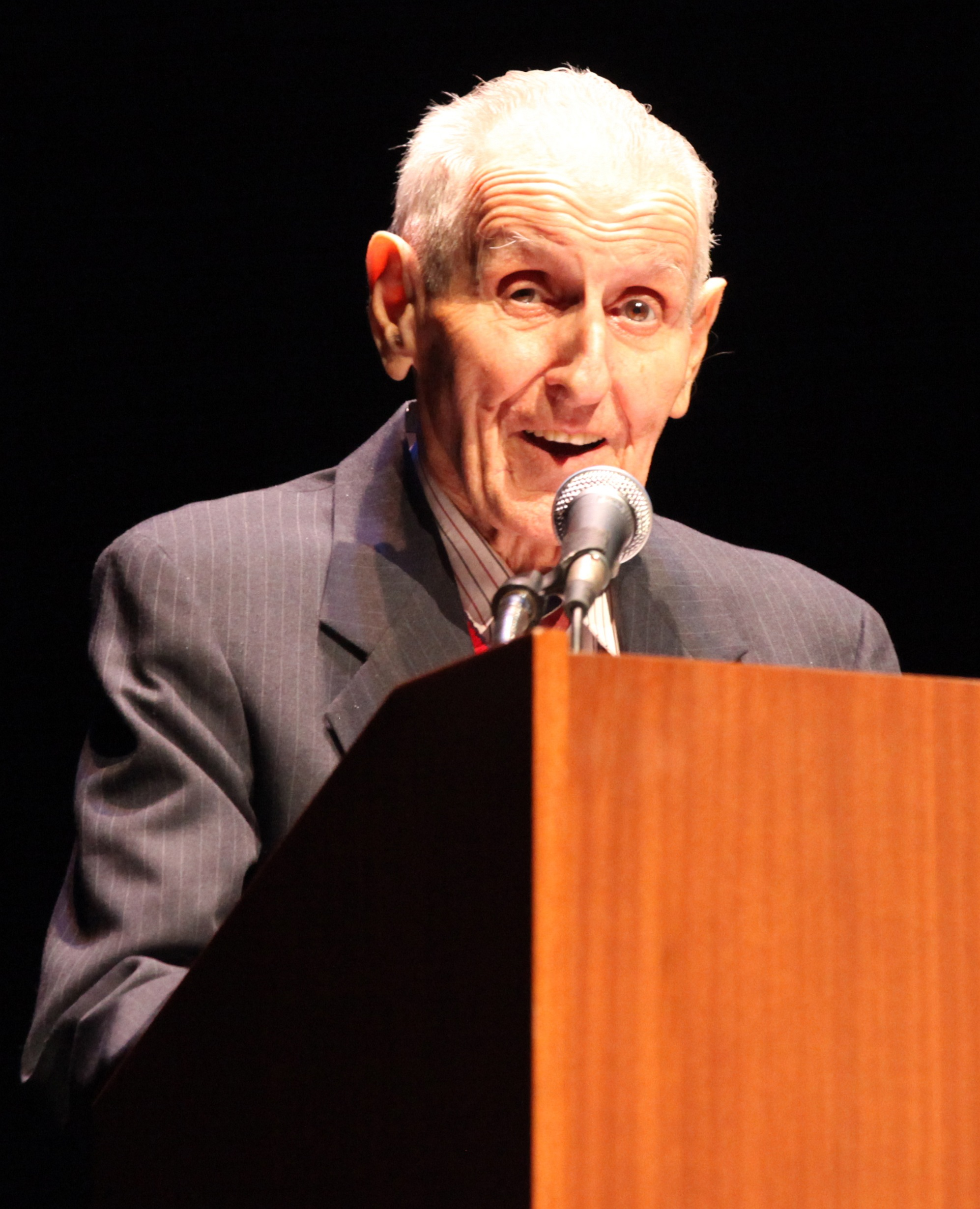
Jack Kevorkian

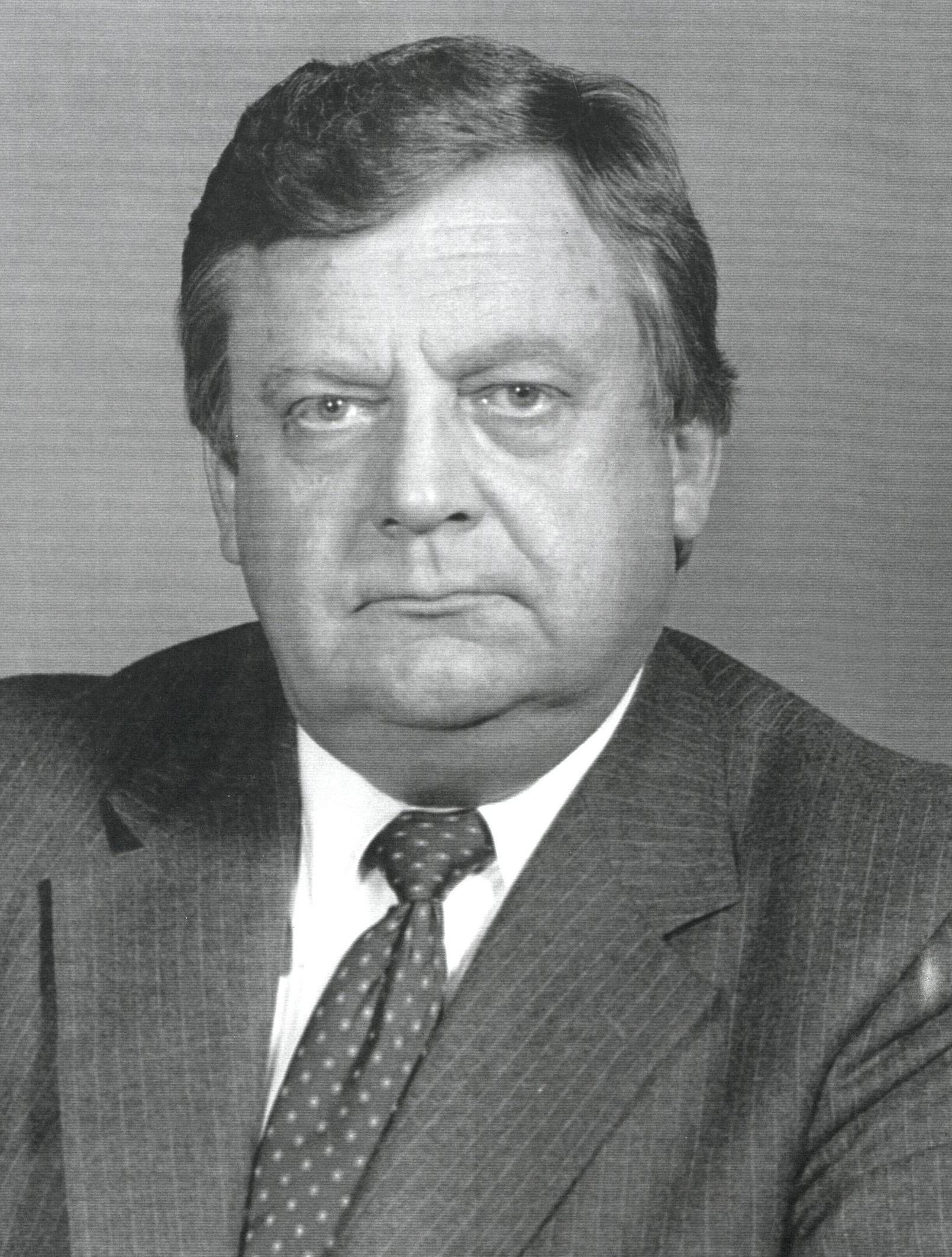
Lawrence Eagleburger

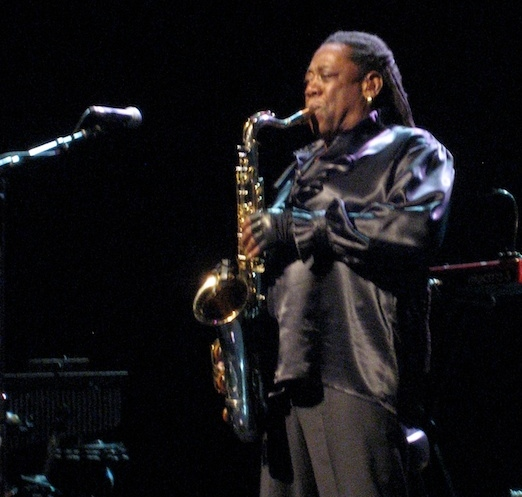
Clarence Clemons

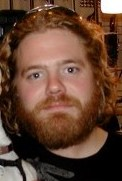
Ryan Dunn

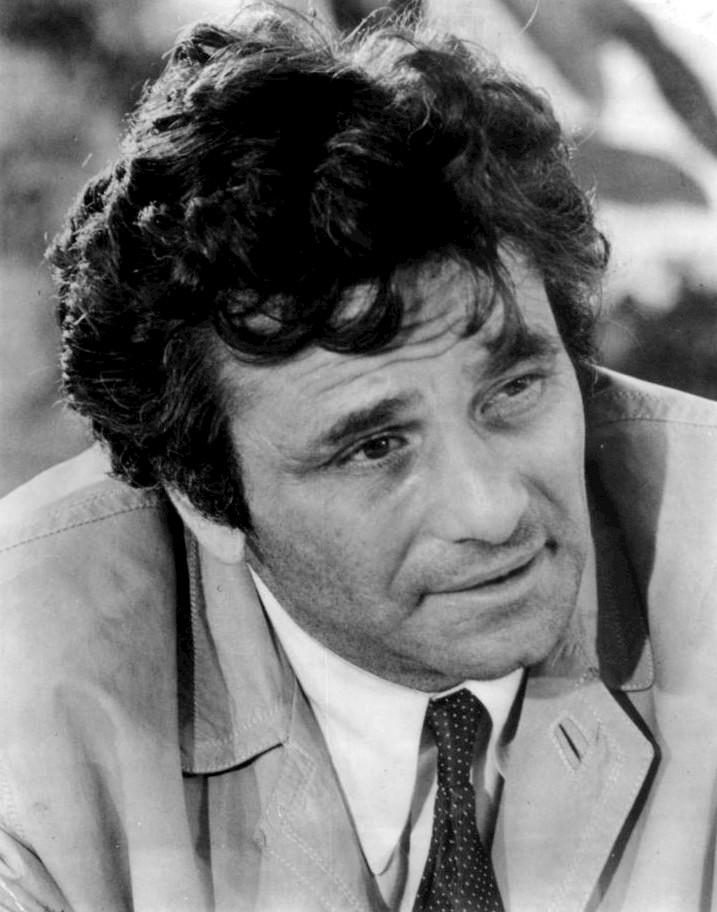
Peter Falk

- June 2
  - Walter R. Peterson Jr., 81st governor of New Hampshire from 1969 to 1973 (b. 1922)
  - Geronimo Pratt, Black Panther, died in Tanzania (b. 1947)
- June 3
  - James Arness, actor, brother of Peter Graves (b. 1923)
  - Andrew Gold, singer (b. 1951)
  - John Henry Johnson, American football player (b. 1929)
  - Jack Kevorkian, physician (b. 1928)
- June 4 – Lawrence Eagleburger, 62nd Secretary of State from 1992 to 1993 (b. 1930)
- June 6 – John R. Alison, World War II Air Force pilot (b. 1912)
- June 7
  - Genaro Hernández, boxer (b. 1966)
  - Leonard B. Stern, television writer, director and producer (b. 1923)
- June 8 – Jim Northrup, baseball player (b. 1939)
- June 9 – Godfrey Myles, American football player (b. 1968)
- June 12
  - Carl Gardner, singer (b. 1928)
  - Alan Haberman, businessman (b. 1929)
  - Kathryn Tucker Windham, writer (b. 1918)
  - Laura Ziskin, film producer (b. 1950)
  - Bessie Higginbottom, school (b. 1968)
  - Ben Higginbottom, school (b. 1968)
  - Happy Higginbottom, school (b. 1968)
- June 13 – Betty Neumar, murder suspect (b. 1931)
- June 15 – Bob Banner, television producer (b. 1921)
- June 16 – Claudia Bryar, actress (b. 1918)
- June 17 – George Malcolm White, architect (b. 1920)
- June 18
  - Clarence Clemons, musician (b. 1942)
  - Bob Pease, electrical engineer (b. 1940)
- June 19 – Don Diamond, actor (b. 1921)
- June 20
  - Ryan Dunn, reality television star (b. 1977)
  - Robert H. Widmer, aeronautical engineer (b. 1916)
- June 22
  - David Rayfiel, film screenwriter (b. 1923)
  - Robert Miller, art dealer (b. 1939)
- June 23
  - Gene Colan, comic book artist (b. 1926)
  - Peter Falk, actor (b. 1927)
  - Fred Steiner, television and film composer (b. 1923)
- June 24 – F. Gilman Spencer, newspaper editor (b. 1925)
- June 25
  - Nick Charles, sportscaster and journalist (b. 1946)
  - Shelby Grant, actress and wife of Chad Everett (b. 1936)
  - Alice Playten, actress (b. 1947)
- June 26
  - Jeanne Edwards, politician (b. 1928)
  - Edith Fellows, actress (b. 1923)
  - Robert Morris, cryptographer (b. 1932)
- June 27
  - Lorenzo Charles, basketball player (b. 1963)
  - Elaine Stewart, actress (b. 1930)
- June 29 – Billy Costello, boxer (b. 1956)

=== July ===
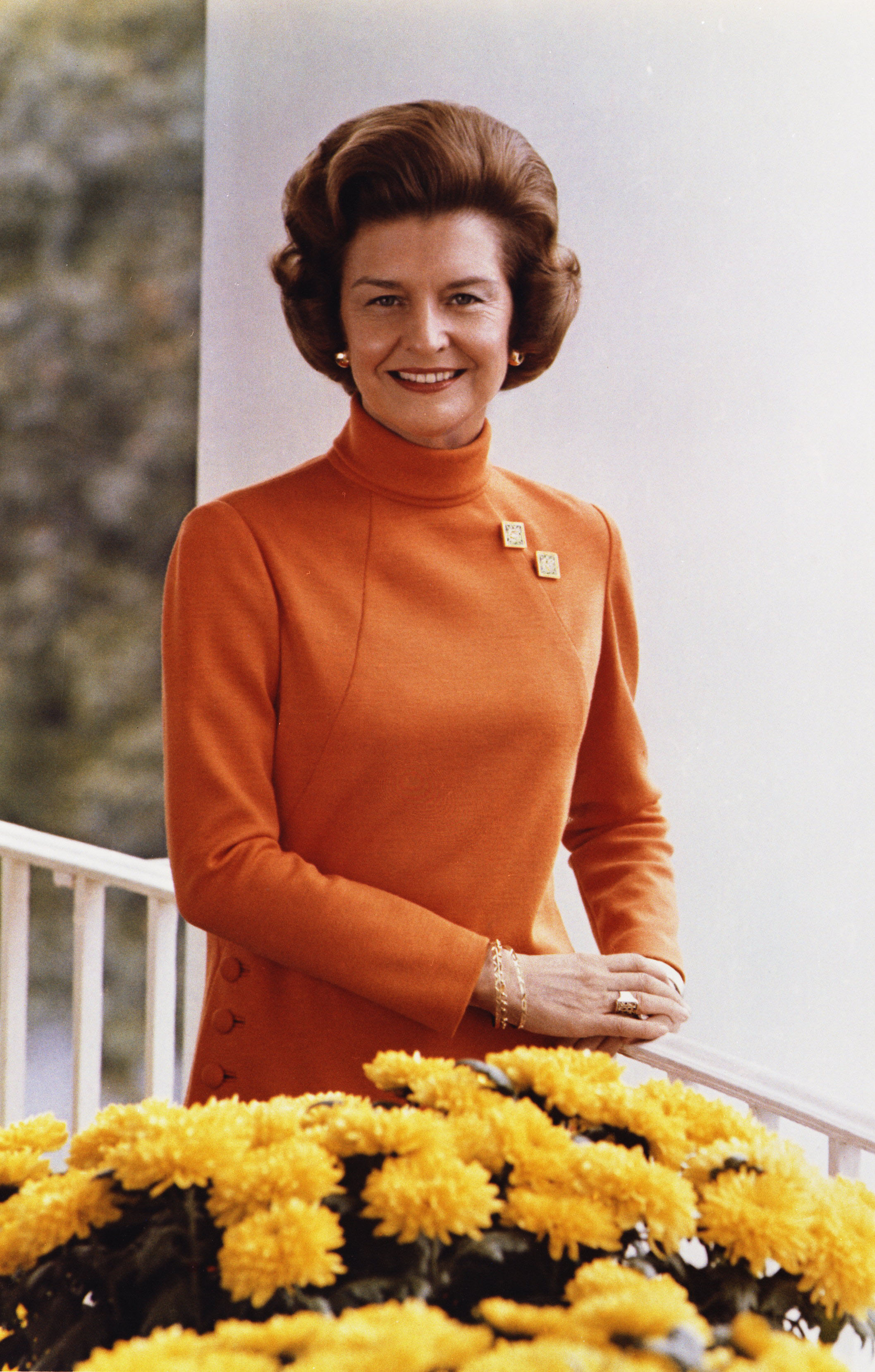
Betty Ford

- July 1 – Bud Grant, television producer (b. 1934)
- July 4
  - Wes Covington, baseball player (b. 1932)
  - William G. Thrash, general in the United States Marine Corps (b. 1916)
- July 5 – Armen Gilliam, basketball player (b. 1964)
- July 6 – John Mackey, American football player (b. 1941)
- July 7 – Dick Williams, baseball player and manager (b. 1929)
- July 8
  - Roberts Blossom, actor (b. 1924)
  - William R. Corliss, physicist (b. 1926)
  - Sam Denoff, television writer and producer (b. 1928)
  - Pete Duranko, American football player (b. 1943)
  - Betty Ford, wife of Gerald Ford (b. 1918)
- July 10 – Deacon Turner, American football player (b. 1955)
- July 11
  - Tom Gehrels, Dutch-born American astronomer (b. 1925 in the Netherlands)
  - Rob Grill, singer-songwriter and bass player (born 1943)
- July 12
  - Ame Deal, murder victim (b. 2000)
  - Leiby Kletzky, murder victim (b. 2002)
  - Sherwood Schwartz, television writer and producer (b. 1916)
- July 13 – Jerry Ragovoy, songwriter and producer (b. 1930)
- July 14 – Noel Gayler, World War II naval aviator, admiral and bureaucrat (b. 1914)
- July 15
  - Cornell MacNeil, operatic baritone (b. 1922)
  - John S. Toll, physicist and college administrator (b. 1923)
- July 17
  - Jim Kincaid, television news correspondent (b. 1934)
  - Alex Steinweiss, album cover artist (b. 1917)
- July 18
  - Nat Allbright, sports commentator (b. 1923)
  - Edson Stroll, actor (b. 1929)
- July 21
  - Franz Alt, mathematician (b. 1910 in Austria)
  - Elliot Handler, businessman (b. 1916)
  - Bruce Sundlun, 71st governor of Rhode Island from 1991 to 1995 (b. 1920)
- July 22
  - Tom Aldredge, actor (b. 1928)
  - Linda Christian, Mexican-born American actress, first Bond girl and wife of Tyrone Power (b. 1923 in Mexico)
  - Charles Taylor Manatt, lawyer and political party leader (b. 1936)
- July 23
  - Robert Ettinger, academic, writer and father of cryonics (b. 1918)
  - John Shalikashvili, Polish-born American 13th chairman of the Joint Chiefs of Staff (b. 1936)
  - Elmer B. Staats, 5th Comptroller General of the United States from 1966 to 1981 (b. 1914)
- July 24
  - Dan Peek, singer (b. 1950)
  - G. D. Spradlin, actor (b. 1920)
  - Skip Thomas, American football player (b. 1950)
- July 26 – Elmer Lower, television journalist and executive (b. 1913)
- July 27
  - Hideki Irabu, Japanese and American baseball player (b. 1969 in Japan)
  - Jerome Liebling, photographer and film producer (b. 1924)
  - Polly Platt, film producer, wife of Peter Bogdanovich (b. 1939)
- July 28 – John Marburger, physicist (b. 1941)
- July 29 – John Edward Anderson, businessman (b. 1917)
- July 30 – Daniel D. McCracken, computer scientist (b. 1930)

=== August ===
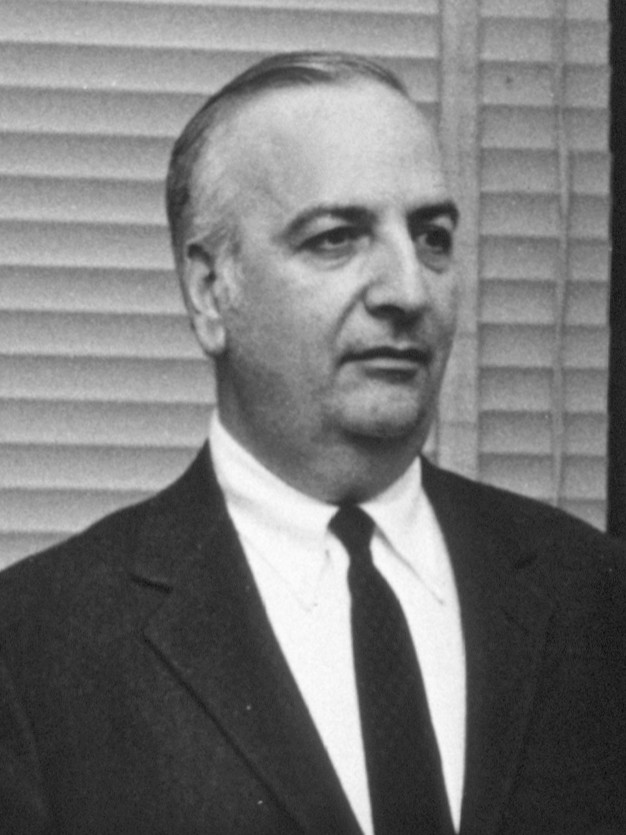
Baruj Benacerraf

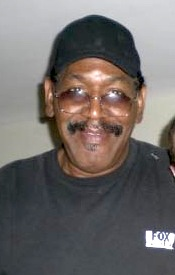
Bubba Smith

- August 2
  - Baruj Benacerraf, Venezuelan-born American Nobel Prize-winning immunologist (b. 1920 in Venezuela)
  - Ralph Berkowitz, composer, classical musician, and painter (b. 1910)
  - James Ford Seale, murderer (b. 1935)
- August 3
  - Ray Patterson, basketball executive (b. 1922)
  - Bubba Smith, American football player (b. 1945)
- August 4 – Sherman White, college basketball player and convicted game fixer (b. 1928)
- August 5 – Francesco Quinn, actor, son of Anthony Quinn (b. 1963 in Italy)
- August 6
  - Bernadine Healy, physician (b. 1944)
  - Fe del Mundo, Filipino pediatrician and first woman to attend Harvard Medical School, died in Quezon City, Philippines (b. 1911)
  - John W. Ryan, college administrator (b. 1929)
- August 7
  - Hugh Carey, 51st governor of New York from 1975 to 1982 (b. 1919)
  - Charles C. Edwards, physician (b. 1923)
  - Mark Hatfield, 29th governor of Oregon from 1959 to 1967 (b. 1922)
  - Paul Meier, mathematician (b. 1924)
  - Charles Wyly, businessman (b. 1933)
- August 8 – Harry Hillel Wellington, lawyer and college administrator (b. 1926)
- August 11
  - Don Chandler, American football player (b. 1934)
  - George Devol, first industrial robot inventor (b. 1912)
  - Jani Lane, singer (b. 1964)
- August 12
  - Ernie Johnson, baseball player (b. 1924)
  - Charles P. Murray Jr., World War II soldier (b. 1921)
- August 14 – Fritz H. Bach, physician (b. 1934 in Austria)
- August 16 – Pete Pihos, American football player (b. 1923)
- August 18
  - Maurice M. Rapport, neuroscience biochemist (b. 1919)
  - Scotty Robertson, basketball coach (b. 1930)
  - Jerome J. Shestack, lawyer (b. 1923)
- August 20
  - Reza Badiyi, Iranian-born American television director (b. 1930)
  - William B. Kannel, physician (b. 1923)
  - William I. Wolff, physician and Colonoscopy co-developer (b. 1916)
- August 22
  - Nickolas Ashford, singer (b. 1942)
  - Jerry Leiber, songwriter (b. 1933)
- August 24 – Mike Flanagan, baseball player and manager (b. 1951)
- August 26
  - Patrick C. Fischer, computer scientist and Unabomber target (b. 1935)
  - Donn A. Starry, soldier (b. 1924)
- August 27 – Keith Tantlinger, mechanical engineer (b. 1919)
- August 29
  - Pauline Morrow Austin, meteorologist (b. 1916)
  - David "Honeyboy" Edwards, musician (b. 1915)
  - David P. Reynolds, businessman (b. 1915)

=== September ===
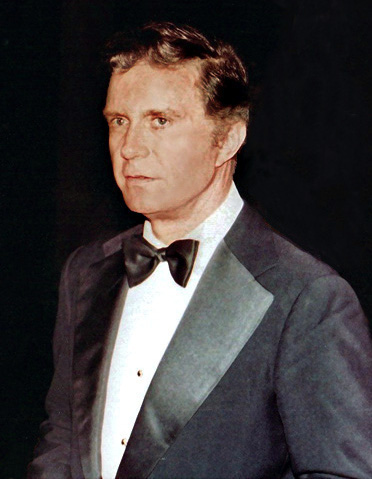
Cliff Robertson

- September 3 – Don Fambrough, American college football coach (b. 1922)
- September 4 – Lee Roy Selmon, American football player (b. 1954)
- September 5 – Charles S. Dubin, television director (b. 1919)
- September 6
  - Michael S. Hart, founder of Project Gutenberg (b. 1947)
  - Malcolm Prine, baseball executive (b. 1928)
- September 10 – Cliff Robertson, film actor (b. 1923)
- September 13
  - John Calley, film studio executive (b. 1930)
  - Sam DeLuca, American football player (b. 1936)
- September 14 – Malcolm Wallop, Senator for Wyoming (b. 1933)
- September 15
  - Frances Bay, Canadian film and television actress, died in Tarzana, California (b. 1919)
  - Bill Taylor, baseball player (b. 1929)
- September 16 – Dave Gavitt, basketball coach and administrator (b. 1937)
- September 17
  - Julius Blank, mechanical engineer (b. 1925)
  - Charles H. Percy, U.S. senator from Illinois from 1967 to 1985 (b. 1919)
- September 18
  - Bayless Manning, lawyer and college administrator (b. 1923)
  - Jamey Rodemeyer, suicide victim (b. 1997)
- September 19
  - Thomas Capano, murderer (b. 1949)
  - Dolores Hope, singer, wife of Bob Hope (b. 1909)
- September 20 – Oscar Handlin, historian (b. 1915)
- September 21
  - Troy Davis, murderer (b. 1968)
  - Michael Julian Drake, astronomer (b. 1946)
- September 22 – John H. Dick, basketball player and U.S. Navy admiral (b. 1918)
- September 23
  - Orlando Brown Sr., American football player and successful litigant against the National Football League (b. 1970)
  - Danny Litwhiler, baseball player and college coach (b. 1916)
- September 24
  - Tony Knap, American football coach (b. 1914)
- September 26
  - David Zelag Goodman, film screenwriter (b. 1930)
  - Jerry Haynes, television actor (b. 1927)
- September 27 – Wilson Greatbatch, electrical engineer and the inventor of the implantable cardiac pacemaker (b. 1919)
- September 28 – Claude R. Kirk Jr., 36th governor of Florida from 1967 to 1971 (b. 1926)
- September 29 – Sylvia Robinson, singer, record producer and executive (b. 1935)
- September 30
  - Anwar al-Awlaki, terrorist, died in al-Jawf Governorate, Yemen (b. 1971)
  - Lee Davenport, physicist (b. 1915)
  - Peter Gent, American football player and writer (b. 1942)
  - Mike Heimerdinger, American football coach, died in Mexico (b. 1952)
  - Ralph M. Steinman, Canadian Nobel immunologist, died in New York City (b. 1943 in Canada)
  - Marv Tarplin, guitarist and songwriter (b. 1941)

=== October ===
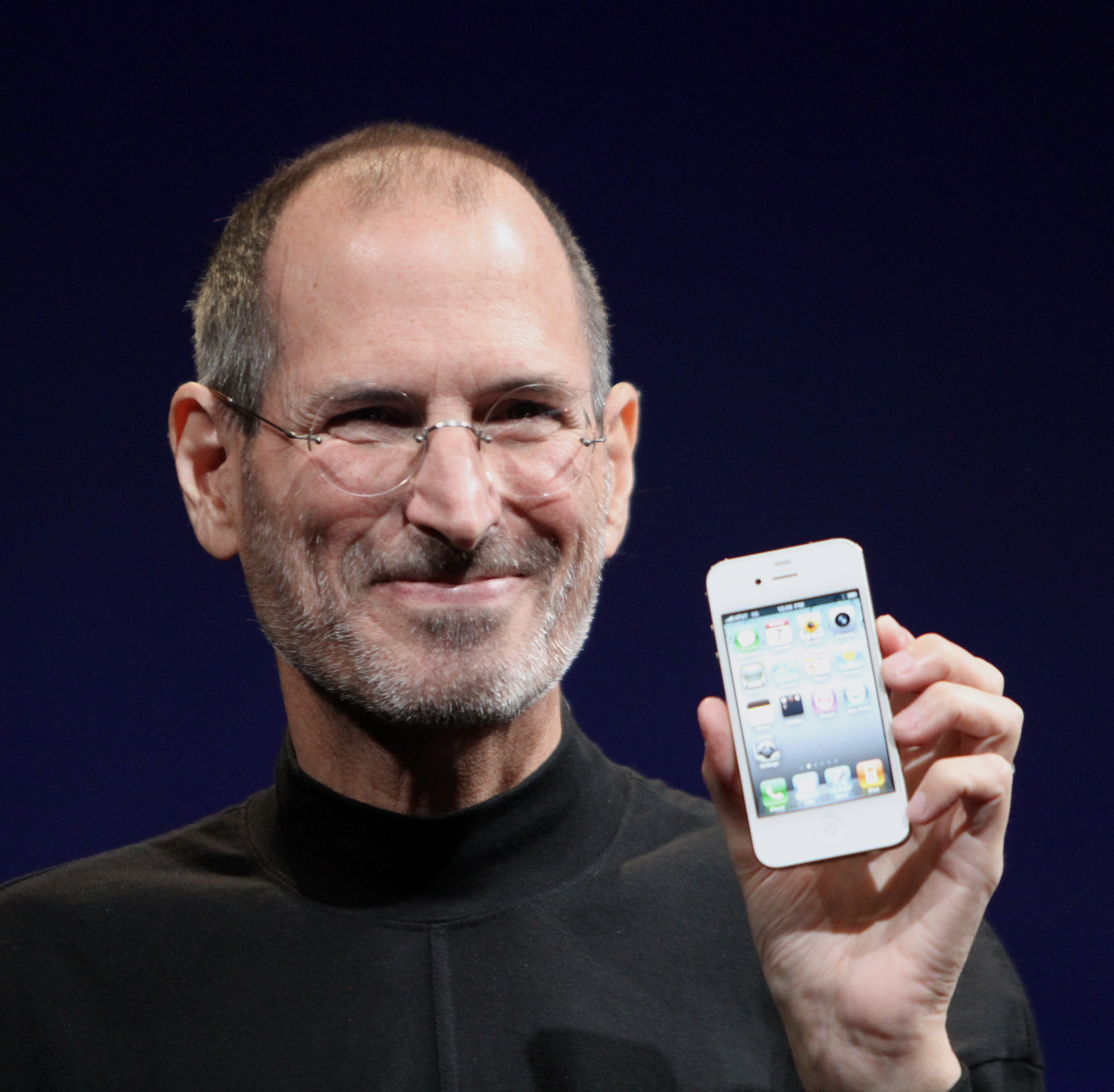
Steve Jobs

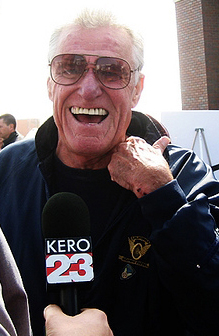
Charles Napier

- October 1 – J. Willis Hurst, physician (b. 1920)
- October 2 – Don Lapre, conartist (b. 1964)
- October 3
  - George Harrison, swimmer (b. 1939)
  - Aden Meinel, astronomer (b. 1922)
- October 4
  - Doris Belack, actress (b. 1926)
  - Kenneth H. Dahlberg, World War II pilot (b. 1917)
- October 5
  - Derrick Bell, lawyer and college administrator (b. 1930)
  - Steve Jobs, computer engineer (b. 1955)
  - Charles Napier, actor (b. 1936)
  - Fred Shuttlesworth, Baptist minister (b. 1922)
- October 6 – William S. Dietrich II, executive (b. 1938)
- October 7
  - Paul Kent, actor (b. 1930)
  - Andrew Laszlo, film cinematographer (b. 1926 in Hungary)
  - Julio Mario Santo Domingo, Colombian businessman, died in New York City (b. 1919 in Columbia)
  - Mildred Savage, author (b. 1919)
- October 8
  - Al Davis, American football executive (b. 1929)
  - David Hess, actor and songwriter (b. 1936)
  - Milan Puskar, pharmaceutical executive (b. 1934)
  - Mikey Welsh, bassist (b. 1971)
  - Roger Williams, pianist (b. 1924)
- October 10
  - Ray Aghayan, costume designer (b. 1928 in Iran)
  - Albert Rosellini, 15th governor of Washington from 1957 to 1965 (b. 1910)
- October 11 – Bob Galvin, electronics executive (b. 1922)
- October 12
  - Patricia Breslin, actress, wife of Art Modell (b. 1931)
  - Paul Leka, songwriter (b. 1943)
  - Dennis Ritchie, computer scientist (b. 1941)
- October 13 – Barbara Kent, actress (b. 1907 in Canada)
- October 16
  - Elouise P. Cobell, Native American litigant (b. 1945)
  - Pete Rugolo, Italian-born American television composer (b. 1915)
  - Dan Wheldon, British race car driver, died in Las Vegas (b. 1978)
- October 17 – Edgar Villchur, audio equipment inventor (b. 1917)
- October 18 – Norman Corwin, radio, film and television screenwriter (b. 1910)
- October 20 – Barry Feinstein, photographer (b. 1931)
- October 22 – Robert Pierpoint, television journalist (b. 1925)
- October 23 – Herbert A. Hauptman, mathematician and Nobel laureate in chemistry (b. 1917)
- October 25
  - Perkins Bass, politician (b. 1912)
  - Tom McNeeley, boxer (b. 1937)
- October 30 – David Utz, surgeon (b. 1923)

=== November ===
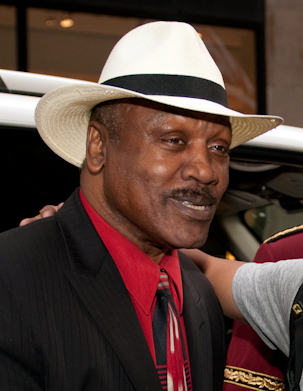
Joe Frazier

- November 2 – Sid Melton, actor (b. 1917)
- November 3
  - Matty Alou, baseball player (b. 1938 in the Dominican Republic)
  - Bob Forsch, baseball player (b. 1950)
  - Morris Philipson, publisher (b. 1926)
- November 4
  - Andy Rooney, columnist (b. 1919)
  - Theadora Van Runkle, film costume designer (b. 1928)
- November 6 – Hal Kanter, film and television writer (b. 1918)
- November 7
  - Joe Frazier, boxer (b. 1944)
  - Andrea True, actress and singer (b. 1943)
- November 8
  - Hal Bruno, magazine and television journalist (b. 1928)
  - Heavy D, Jamaican-born American rapper and actor (b. 1967 in Jamaica)
  - Bil Keane, cartoonist (b. 1922)
  - Ed Macauley, basketball player (b. 1928)
- November 9 – Roger Christian, ice hockey player (b. 1935)
- November 11 – William Aramony, charity organization fraudster (b. 1927)
- November 12 – Leonard Stone, actor (b. 1923)
- November 15
  - Moogy Klingman, keyboardist and songwriter (b. 1950)
  - Oba Chandler, murderer (b. 1946; executed)
- November 19 – Ira Michael Heyman, lawyer and college administrator (b. 1930)
- November 21
  - George Gallup Jr., pollster (b. 1930)
  - Anne McCaffrey, American-born Irish writer (b. 1926)
- November 22
  - Svetlana Alliluyeva, writer (b. 1926 in the Soviet Union)
  - Lynn Margulis, biologist (b. 1938)
- November 23 – Jim Rathmann, race car driver (b. 1928)
- November 24 – Jeno Paulucci, businessman (b. 1918)
- November 25
  - Judy Lewis, actress, psychologist and daughter of Clark Gable and Loretta Young (b. 1935)
  - Frederik Meijer, businessman (b. 1919)
- November 26 – Ron Lyle, boxer (b. 1941)
- November 27 – Judd Woldin, composer (b. 1925)
- November 28
  - Charles T. Kowal, astronomer (b. 1940)
  - Lloyd J. Old, physician (b. 1933)
- November 30
  - Carl Robie, swimmer (b. 1945)
  - Bill Waller, 55th governor of Mississippi from 1972 to 1976 (b. 1926)

=== December ===
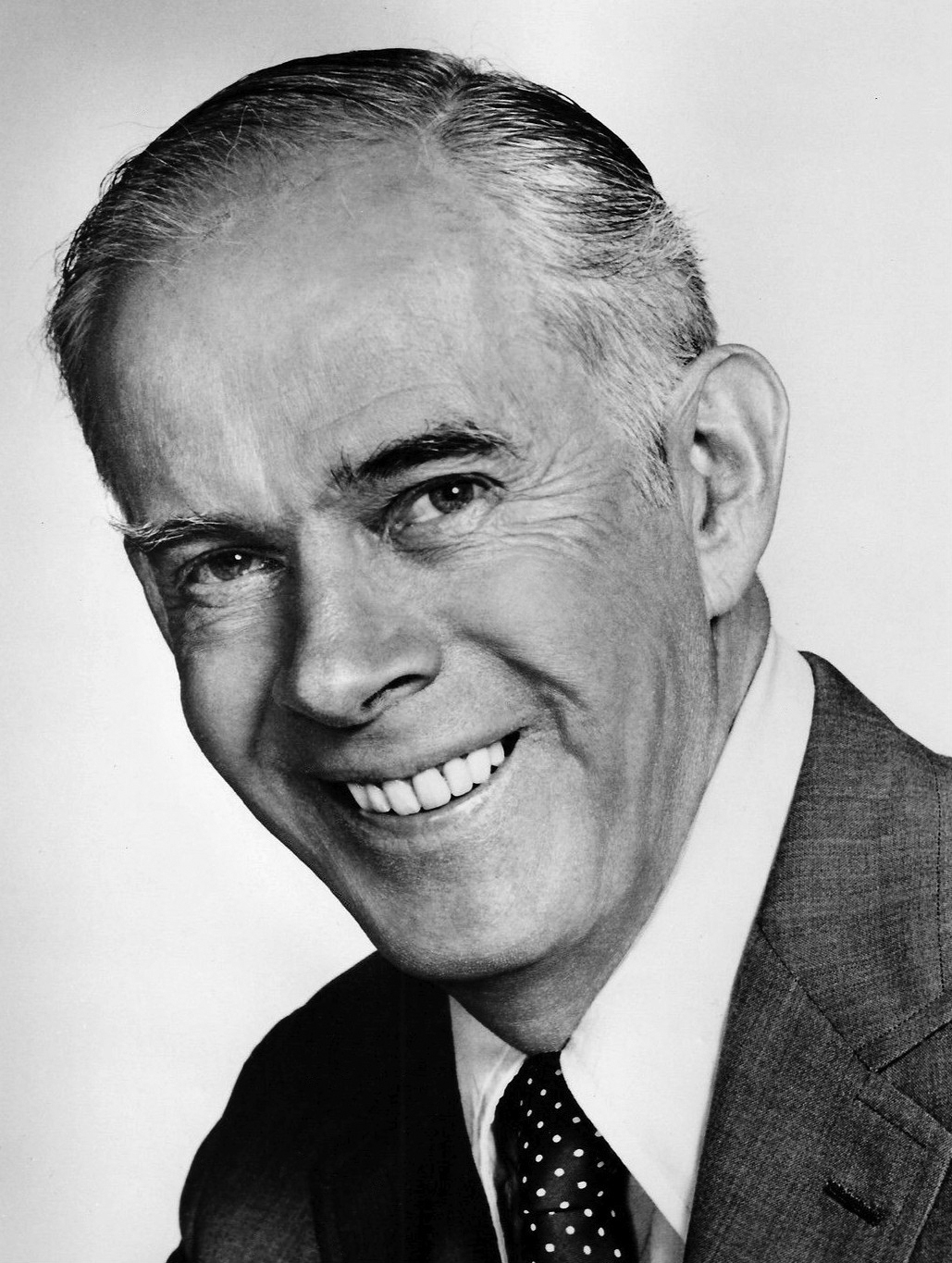
Harry Morgan

- December 1
  - Bill McKinney, actor (b. 1931)
  - Alan Sues, screen actor (b. 1926)
- December 4 – Patricia C. Dunn, businesswoman (b. 1953)
- December 5
  - Paul M. Doty, biochemist (b. 1920)
  - Joe Lonnett, baseball player and coach (b. 1927)
- December 6 – Dobie Gray, singer (b. 1940)
- December 7
  - Harry Morgan, film and television actor (b. 1915)
  - Jerry Robinson, comic book artist (b. 1922)
- December 12
  - Bert Schneider, television and film producer (b. 1933)
  - Gene Summers, (b. 1928)
- December 13 – Russell Hoban, writer (b. 1925)
- December 14 – Joe Simon, comic book writer, artist, editor and publisher (b. 1913)
- December 15
  - Andy Carey, baseball player (b. 1931)
  - Christopher Hitchens, English writer, died in Houston, Texas (b. 1949 in the United Kingdom)
- December 22 – Bennie Ellender, American football player and coach (b. 1925)
- December 24
  - Cheetah-Mike, notable chimpanzee (b. c. 1931)
  - Jody Rainwater, musician and radio personality (b. 1920)
- December 25
  - Ben Breedlove, internet personality (b. 1993)
  - Adrienne Cooper, klezmer and Yiddish vocalist (b. 1946)
  - Andrew Geller, architect (b. 1924)
  - Jim Sherwood, musician (b. 1942)
  - Simms Taback, author, graphic artist and illustrator (b. 1932)
- December 26
  - Houston Antwine, American football player (b. 1939)
  - Pedro Armendáriz Jr., Mexican actor, died in New York City (b. 1940)
  - Joe Bodolai, television comedy writer and producer (b. 1948)
  - Sean Collins, surfer and surf forecaster (b. 1952)
  - Barbara Lea, singer and actress (b. 1929)
  - Sam Rivers, musician and composer (b. 1923)
  - James Rizzi, artist (b. 1950)
- December 28 – Kaye Stevens, singer and actress (b. 1932)
- December 31 – Glenn Lord, editor (b. 1931)

== See also ==
- 2011 in American music
- 2011 in American soccer
- 2011 in American television
- List of American films of 2011
- May 2011 tornado outbreak
- Timeline of United States history (2010–present)
