= List of LazyTown episodes =

LazyTown is a children's television series created by gymnastics champion Magnús Scheving, the CEO of LazyTown Entertainment. The program originally aired on Nickelodeon as part of the Nick Jr. block in the United States. The first two seasons consisted of fifty-two episodes, aired from 2004 to 2007. Turner Broadcasting System Europe then acquired LazyTown Entertainment in 2011 and commissioned a third season consisting of 13 episodes, which premiered on March 13, 2013 in the United Kingdom on Cartoonito. A fourth season, consisting of 13 episodes, premiered in the UK in 2014. A spin-off series entitled LazyTown Extra debuted on CBeebies on September 15, 2008.

== Series overview ==
Season	Episodes	Originally released	
Season	Episodes	First released	Last released
Pilot		2002 (Unaired)	
1	34	August 16, 2004	May 18, 2006
2	18	September 25, 2006	October 15, 2007
3	13	March 13, 2013	December 12, 2013
4	13	January 10, 2014	October 13, 2014

== Episodes ==
=== Unaired pilot (produced in 2002) ===
No.	Title	Directed by	Written by
0	"Field Soccer"	Magnús Scheving	Magnús Scheving
This is the unaired pilot that was made to pitch the idea of the series, but never officially aired. It uses clips of mix of both live action scenes and storyboards here. The role of Stephanie was played by Shelby Young, while the puppet characters were voiced by child actors. Magnús Scheving also portrays Sportacus in the pilot, while his voice was dubbed over by an unknown American actor. The short clips used here in the unaired pilot includes: "A Beautiful Day", "Happy Birthday", "One on One", "Let's Go!", "Sportacus", and "The Bing Bang Song".

=== Season 1 (2004–2006) ===
No.	Title	Directed by	Written by	Original release date	Prod. code
1	"Welcome to LazyTown"	Magnús Scheving and Raymond P. Le Gué	Story by : Magnús Scheving; Written by : Noah Zachary, Cole Louie, and Magnús Scheving	August 16, 2004	106
Stephanie arrives in town, staying with her Uncle, Mayor Milford. She meets the kids of LazyTown, and after meeting the slightly above-average hero Sportacus, he shows them the energetic and healthy lifestyle. However, the local villain - Robbie Rotten, wants LazyTown to stay lazy, and he attempts to put Sportacus out of commission in various ways. However, when one of his plans accidentally targets Bessie, it's up to Stephanie to rally her new friends and Sportacus to save the day.
2	"Defeeted"	Magnús Scheving	Story by : Scott Gray; Written by : Noah Zachary, Magnús Scheving, Máni Svavarsson, and Scott Gray	August 16, 2004	103
It's Spectacular Sports Day, and Sportacus is about to try a new soccer trick. However, when Robbie Rotten switches Sportacus' boots with a pair of radio-controlled ones, it makes it impossible for him to be how he is. Enter Robbie as Lazycus to become the new town hero. Can Sportacus defeat his own feet? Social/learning results: Perseverance in pursuing one's goals leads to solutions.
3	"Sports Day"	Rufus Scott Church	Story by : Magnús Scheving and Máni Svavarsson; Written by : Rocky Garibaldi, Scott Gray, and Magnús Scheving	August 17, 2004	102
Robbie challenges Sportacus in an amazing super race within the LazyTown Sports Day. But when he tricks Sportacus into eating a candy apple, can the kids beat Robbie's cheating ways and help Sportacus?
4	"Crystal Caper"	Magnús Scheving and Steve Feldman	Story by : Magnús Scheving and Máni Svavarsson; Written by : Noah Zachary, Michael Rabb, and Magnús Scheving	August 18, 2004	105
When Sportacus accidentally drops his Crystal, a covetous Stingy picks it up, and does not return it. Robbie turns in a fake crystal in order to get one free wish: the banishment of Sportacus. Will Stingy give the crystal back in time to save the day?
5	"Sleepless in LazyTown"	Steve Feldman and Magnús Scheving	Story by : Adam Peltzman and Magnús Scheving; Written by : Noah Zachary, Cole Louie, and Magnús Scheving	August 19, 2004	111
When Sportacus teaches Pixel how to sleep at the right time, Robbie takes advantage of this by hiding a noise-making baseball in his airship. When Sportacus starts losing energy, Stephanie and the kids uncover Robbie's plot and they make sure to get lots of sleep so they can beat Robbie in an all-or-nothing baseball game.
6	"Swiped Sweets"	Steve Feldman, Magnús Scheving and Raymond P. Le Gué	Story by : Magnús Scheving and Máni Svavarsson; Written by : Noah Zachary, Cole Louie, Tom K. Mason, Dan Danko, and Magnús Scheving	August 20, 2004	109
It's Bessie's Birthday, and the kids bake a cake for her. However, it goes missing, and all evidence, according to "Hintslock Foams", one of Robbie's disguises, points to Sportacus and he's placed in Lazy Jail. Can the kids find out who really took the cake?
7	"Hero for a Day"	Magnús Scheving	Story by : Magnús Scheving; Written by : Noah Zachary, Cole Louie, Adam Peltzman, and Magnús Scheving	August 23, 2004	112
Ziggy wants to be a hero like Sportacus, but his attempts of being one keeps getting him in the way. Meanwhile, Robbie Rotten gets a terrible case of insomnia due to a lack of sleep, which wants to cause more havoc than usual - including sawing the Kids' Clubhouse and trapping them so he can get some much needed sleep. Can Ziggy prove to be a worthy hero and save the day?
8	"Sportafake"	Raymond P. Le Gué	Story by : Ole Olson Steen and Magnús Scheving; Written by : Noah Zachary, Cole Louie, and Magnús Scheving	August 24, 2004	108
Tired of the kids always obeying Sportacus, Robbie disguises himself as the slightly above-average hero and makes the kids do his bidding. Can Stephanie stand up for herself to be heard? Meanwhile, the Mayor is helping Bessie out in the yard to near-destruction.
9	"Happy Brush Day"	Magnús Scheving	Story by : Magnús Scheving; Written by : Noah Zachary, Cole Louie, Mo Willems, and Magnús Scheving	August 25, 2004	110
It's Ziggy's birthday, and all he wants is taffy. When Sportacus' gift, a brand new toothbrush, is discarded for a super-automated voice-activated taffy shooter by "The Birthday Fairy", aka Robbie Rotten, trouble ensues. When the machine goes haywire and drowns LazyTown in taffy, Ziggy must use the toothbrush to clean his teeth and save everyone!
10	"Lazy Scouts"	Magnús Scheving	Story by : Mike Weiss and Magnús Scheving; Written by : Noah Zachary, Rocky Garibaldi, and Magnús Scheving	August 26, 2004	104
Robbie dresses up as a scoutmaster to teach the kids how to be the laziest Lazy Scouts of all time, but when a windstorm causes problems - Stephanie must help her friends listen to her on how to stay calm.
11	"Dr. Rottenstein"	Magnús Scheving	Story by : Rocky Garibaldi, Tom K. Mason, Dan Danko, and Magnús Scheving; Written by : Noah Zachary, Cole Louie, and Magnús Scheving	September 27, 2004	116
Robbie Rotten disguises himself as "Dr. Rottenstein", and declares the town under quarantine from "spotty vegetitus", which according to him can be found in sports candy and that junk food can control it. However, when Robbie's attempts at trying to steal all of Sportacus' Sports Candy supplies trap him in Sportacus' out-of-control airship, it's up to Ziggy to eat his vegetables and save everyone.
12	"Rottenbeard"	Raymond P. Le Gué and Magnús Scheving	Story by : Magnús Scheving; Written by : Noah Zachary, Cole Louie, Ken Pontac, and Magnús Scheving	October 4, 2004	119
Robbie Rotten, cleverly disguised as Rottenbeard the pirate, sails into town and takes the kids on a fake treasure hunt on hunt for the LazyTown Stone.
13	"Cry Dinosaur"	Raymond P. Le Gué	Story by : Magnús Scheving; Written by : Noah Zachary, Cole Louie, and Magnús Scheving	October 25, 2004	115
Stephanie, Stingy, and Ziggy are camping, but Ziggy is afraid of the dark. When Robbie Rotten appears disguised as a scary purple dinosaur in an attempt to be rid of Sportacus, the others don't believe him - until they notice it for real. It's up to Ziggy to confront the dinosaur and save his friends.
14	"My Treehouse"	Magnús Scheving	Story by : Magnús Scheving; Written by : Noah Zachary, Cole Louie, and Magnús Scheving	November 11, 2004	113
A treehouse-building competition is being held in LazyTown, but Stingy takes the credit for himself for building it. Social/learning results: Friends are the greatest trophy of all.
15	"The Laziest Town"	Raymond P. Le Gué and Magnús Scheving	Story by : Magnús Scheving; Written by : Noah Zachary, Cole Louie, and Magnús Scheving	June 6, 2005	122
LazyTown will be named the laziest town in the world unless they can generate enough activity to raise the energy meter by the end of the day. Robbie Rotten is determined to thwart their efforts by being lazy and counteracting their energy. Will Robbie succeed in making LazyTown the laziest town in the world?
16	"Dear Diary"	Raymond P. Le Gué	Story by : Hanna Maja; Written by : Noah Zachary, Cole Louie, and Magnús Scheving	June 7, 2005	118
When Robbie finds Stephanie's Diary, he writes nasty things in it and gives them as fake notes. Stephanie is then greeted to the nasty surprise of sour faces, and wonders why her friends are upset with her. Can Sportacus help prove that Stephanie didn't write the mean notes? Note: This is the first clip show episode.
17	"Zap It!"	Steve Feldman and Jonathan Judge	Story by : Matthew Donlan, Martin Carlton, and Magnús Scheving; Written by : Noah Zachary, Cole Louie, and Magnús Scheving	June 8, 2005	107
When Pixel builds a machine to help him get out of chores, Robbie takes it to vanish Sportacus and turn him invisible. Can Pixel right his wrong?
18	"Record's Day"	Magnús Scheving and Jonathan Judge	Story by : Magnús Scheving; Written by : Noah Zachary, Cole Louie, and Magnús Scheving	June 9, 2005	131
The LazyTown kids plan to set a world record in being active, which jeopardizes Robbie's plan to set a record for laziness.
19	"Prince Stingy"	Raymond P Le Gué	Story by : Magnús Scheving; Written by : Noah Zachary, Cole Louie, and Magnús Scheving	June 10, 2005	132
Robbie Rotten, in another one of his disguises, makes Stingy believe he's the prince of LazyTown. Stingy loves being a prince but is in real trouble when Robbie locks him up in a castle. It's up to all his friends to rescue him from Robbie's despicable trap.
20	"Pixelspix"	Raymond P. Le Gué	Story by : Inger Le Gué; Written by : Noah Zachary, Cole Louie, and Magnús Scheving	July 11, 2005	117
Pixel decides to create a video and song-sharing website with everyone on LazyTown on it. Robbie Rotten is jealous that he's not on the site, but soon gets trapped inside the site. Note: This is the second clip show episode.
21	"Play Day"	Magnús Scheving	Story by : Magnús Scheving; Written by : Noah Zachary, Cole Louie, and Magnús Scheving	August 1, 2005	129
Today is Play Day, and all of the kids in town pretend to be cowboys and jungle animals. Robbie is here, as usual, dressed as a cowboy and eventually a Gorilla, to ruin the kids' fun.
22	"Remote Control"	Magnús Scheving and Raymond P. Le Gué	Story by : Magnús Scheving; Written by : Noah Zachary, Cole Louie, and Magnús Scheving	August 2, 2005	121
Pixel creates a remote control device to control everything for him, but Robbie steals it and uses it to possess everyone - especially Sportacus. It's up to Pixel to take it back.
23	"Sportacus Who?"	Jonathan Judge	Story by : Magnús Scheving; Written by : Noah Zachary, Cole Louie, and Magnús Scheving	August 3, 2005	123
Robbie creates a device that wipes out Sportacus' memory. But when Robbie finds himself in trouble, he must convince Sportacus that he's a hero.
24	"Soccer Sucker"	Magnús Scheving	Story by : Magnús Scheving and Mo Willems; Written by : Noah Zachary, Cole Louie, and Magnús Scheving	August 3, 2005	114
Robbie climbs inside a soccer-playing robot with an eye toward beating Sportacus at soccer, once and for all.
25	"Miss Roberta"	Raymond P. Le Gué and Jonathan Judge	Noah Zachary and Cole Louie	August 4, 2005	127
Stephanie wants to throw a thank-you party for Sportacus, so she encourages her friends to have good manners to plan the perfect party. But Robbie soon appears and poses as "Miss Roberta", an expert in manners, but actually, he teaches the kids to misbehave even more, and soon the party becomes a disaster.
26	"LazyTown's New Superhero"	Magnús Scheving and Jonathan Judge	Story by : Magnús Scheving; Written by : Noah Zachary, Cole Louie, and Magnús Scheving	August 14, 2005	120 (Part 1), 124 (Part 2)
The LazyTowners decide to repay Sportacus for all his heroics by giving him a day off, but Sportacus cannot get used to relaxing and wants to go back to exercising and being a superhero. Robbie Rotten takes advantage of Sportacus' day off by creating a vicious robotic dog who chases and attacks everyone who says the word "trouble". However, when the dog malfunctions and starts chasing Robbie and the kids, it's up to Sportacus and "Sportastephanie" to save the day and stop the supervillain's robot dog. Note: This is a double-length special.
27	"Secret Agent Zero"	Jonathan Judge and Magnús Scheving	Story by : Magnús Scheving and Gudmundur Thor Karason; Written by : Noah Zachary, Cole Louie, and Magnús Scheving	October 21, 2005	126
Robbie Rotten, disguised as a mayor elector, wins the election for Mayor by cheating and rigging the votes and encouraging laziness. It's up to major Spy Mayor Meanswell to foil Robbie's plans.
28	"LazyTown's Greatest Hits"	Magnús Scheving	Story by : Magnús Scheving; Written by : Noah Zachary, Cole Louie, and Magnús Scheving	November 23, 2005	128
Stephanie and Ziggy visit all the people of LazyTown to ask them what their favorite LazyTown song is. Note: This is the third Clip Show episode.
29	"LazyTown's Surprise Santa"	Magnús Scheving and Jonathan Judge	Story by : Magnús Scheving; Written by : Noah Zachary, Cole Louie, and Magnús Scheving	December 9, 2005 (Note: This episode was first released on Surprise Santa VHS/DVD on October 11, 2005.)	125
Robbie Rotten thinks he's not invited to the annual Christmas party so the supervillain decides to ruin it by sending a giant snowball to crash the festivities while dressed up as Santa Claus. When he finds out that he was invited, it's now up to everyone to halt the snowball and save Christmas.
30	"Robbie's Greatest Misses"	Jonathan Judge and Magnús Scheving	Story by : Magnús Scheving; Written by : Noah Zachary, Cole Louie, and Magnús Scheving	February 7, 2006	133
Robbie Rotten can't find out why his plots against Sportacus have never worked. Soon he devises the ultimate plan -- to use all of his despicable inventions against Sportacus at the same time! Will Robbie Rotten finally defeat Sportacus and make LazyTown lazy again?
31	"Sports Candy Festival"	Jonathan Judge	Story by : Magnús Scheving; Written by : Noah Zachary, Cole Louie, and Magnús Scheving	May 16, 2006	134
Stephanie and her friends want to do something nice for Sportacus, so they decide to grow fruits and vegetables to hold a Sports Candy Festival. Meanwhile, Robbie wants to stop the festivities, so he disguises himself as life-size fruits and vegetables, hoping to scare the kids and stop the festivities.
32	"Dancing Duel"	Magnús Scheving	Story by : Magnús Scheving; Written by : Noah Zachary, Cole Louie, and Magnús Scheving	May 17, 2006	135
Robbie creates a clockwork dancing girl (Kristjana Sæunn Olafsdóttir) to compete against Stephanie in the dance competition. However, when Stephanie gets stiff to the point she suffers from pain when she stretches, she must find a way to stop her problems.
33	"Ziggy's Alien"	Jonathan Judge	Story by : Magnús Scheving; Written by : Noah Zachary, Cole Louie, and Magnús Scheving	May 15, 2006	130
When Robbie Rotten poses as an alien named Zobby, the kids want to bring the alien back to his own planet. What they didn't know is that Ziggy has befriended the disguised Robbie and is on the rocket as well! Can Sportacus save both of them before the rocket crashes?
34	"Sportacus on the Move!"	Magnús Scheving	Story by : Magnús Scheving; Written by : Noah Zachary, Cole Louie, and Magnús Scheving	May 18, 2006	136
A day in the life of Sportacus as he goes about his daily routine as a superhero - performing incredible stunts and saving all the residents of LazyTown including the supervillain Robbie Rotten. Note: This is the fourth clip show episode. This is also the only episode where "Bing Bang" doesn't play at the end.

=== Season 2 (2006–2007) ===
No.	Title	Directed by	Written by	Original release date	Prod. code
35	"Rockin' Robbie"	Magnús Scheving	Story by : Magnús Scheving; Written by : Magnús Scheving, Máni Svavarsson, and Noah Zachary	September 25, 2006	201
Robbie Rotten disguises himself as the famous rock singer Johnny B. Badd to convince the kids to be lazy and demand Sportacus to leave LazyTown forever.
36	"Little Sportacus"	Magnús Scheving	Story by : Magnús Scheving; Written by : Magnús Scheving, Máni Svavarsson, and Noah Zachary	September 26, 2006	202
Robbie Rotten uses a device on Sportacus and de-ages him into a 10-year-old boy (Davíð Kristján Ólafsson, voiced by Thórdis Thorvaldsdóttir). Can Stephanie find a way to help Sportacus age himself back to normal?
37	"Trash Trouble"	Sigvaldi J. Karason	Story by : Magnús Scheving; Written by : Magnús Scheving, Máni Svavarsson, and Noah Zachary	September 27, 2006	203
LazyTown holds a Keep Tidy campaign, but Robbie Rotten is on the verge to stop it. His result? Using a giant trash cannon, of course!
38	"Double Trouble"	Jonathan Judge	Story by : Magnús Scheving; Written by : Magnús Scheving, Máni Svavarsson, and Noah Zachary	September 28, 2006	204
Robbie disguises himself as Mayor Meanswell in order to make the kids listen to him and change LazyTown's rules.
39	"Haunted Castle"	Magnús Scheving	Story by : Magnús Scheving; Written by : Noah Zachary, Máni Svavarsson, and Magnús Scheving	October 24, 2006	205
Trixie convinces the kids to join her inside an old, unsafe castle. Meanwhile, Robbie Rotten poses as a ghost to scare the kids into not wandering inside that place anymore.
40	"Snow Monster"	Magnús Scheving	Story by : Magnús Scheving; Written by : Magnús Scheving, Máni Svavarsson, and Noah Zachary	December 15, 2006	206
It's a lovely snowy day in LazyTown, and it's a lovely day to play outside! However, Robbie Rotten dresses up as the snow monster to scare the kids into playing inside.
41	"The LazyTown Circus"	Magnús Scheving	Story by : Magnús Scheving; Written by : Magnús Scheving, Máni Svavarsson, and Noah Zachary	April 2, 2007	207
The kids put on a Circus, while Robbie Rotten appears as a ringmaster - in another one of his attempts to get rid of Sportacus. However, when her friends get trapped, Stephanie must conquer her fear of heights and save them.
42	"School Scam"	Magnús Scheving and Jonathan Judge	Story by : Magnús Scheving; Written by : Magnús Scheving, Máni Svavarsson, and Noah Zachary	April 5, 2007	208
Robbie Rotten poses as a teacher at the LazyTown school so he can stop the kids from learning new things. But when he accidentally causes a problem with a science experiment, the school is on the verge of exploding. Can Sportacus arrive in time to save everyone?
43	"Pixel TV"	Jonathan Judge	Story by : Magnús Scheving; Written by : Magnús Scheving, Máni Svavarsson, and Noah Zachary	April 4, 2007	209
Pixel sets up LazyTown TV, full of healthy and happy programming. However, Robbie Rotten uses various different guises to try and stop the programmes, ending with him trapped on Pixel's roof trying to destroy his satellite dish.
44	"Friends Forever"	Magnús Scheving and Jonathan Judge	Story by : Magnús Scheving; Written by : Magnús Scheving, Máni Svavarsson, and Noah Zachary	April 3, 2007	210
Stephanie builds a cool Play Park for her friends, but Robbie Rotten has other ideas. With his new teacup ride, he lures the kids into riding it - but it soon goes berserk.
45	"Energy Book"	Magnús Scheving and Jonathan Judge	Story by : Magnús Scheving; Written by : Magnús Scheving, Máni Svavarsson, and Noah Zachary	May 6, 2007	211
Sportacus introduces the kids to Energy Books - where they can earn badges for tracking the Sports Candy they can eat, and the exercise they can get. Robbie Rotten, however, wants to wreck the concept by giving out badges for doing lazy things.
46	"Birthday Surprise!"	Jonathan Judge	Story by : Magnús Scheving; Written by : Magnús Scheving, Máni Svavarsson, and Noah Zachary	May 12, 2007	212
It's Sportacus' birthday and the kids are arguing about where to have the party. Robbie Rotten takes advantage of this by building a wall to split the rowing kids away and send Sportacus on another sugar meltdown by giving him a Sugar Apple. Can the kids settle their differences and stop Robbie?
47	"LazyTown Goes Digital"	Magnús Scheving	Story by : Magnús Scheving; Written by : Magnús Scheving, Máni Svavarsson, and Noah Zachary	May 20, 2007	213
Pixel thinks that technology can solve any problem. But everything goes haywire once Robbie wires the whole town together.
48	"The Lazy Genie"	Magnús Scheving	Story by : Magnús Scheving; Written by : Magnús Scheving, Máni Svavarsson, and Noah Zachary	June 21, 2007	214
Robbie Rotten receives a magic lamp with a genie (Örn Arnason) inside. However, he proves more problematic for Robbie than helpful.
49	"Once Upon a Time"	Jonathan Judge and Magnús Scheving	Story by : Magnús Scheving; Written by : Magnús Scheving, Máni Svavarsson, and Noah Zachary	August 5, 2007	215
The kids get stuck in Pixel's fairy tale book device with the Big Bad Wolf (Robbie Rotten in disguise). Sportacus must travel inside the book and stop the Wolf. Note: Stephanie, Ziggy, Stingy, Robbie Rotten (played as the Big Bad Wolf), and Sportacus in the story were animated by Funbag Animation Studios.
50	"The Lazy Rockets"	Magnús Scheving	Story by : Magnús Scheving; Written by : Magnús Scheving, Máni Svavarsson, and Noah Zachary	August 12, 2007	216
Robbie Rotten decides to enter the LazyTown car race. He soon creates the ultimate car once he steals the kids' car parts and cheats significantly.
51	"Dancing Dreams"	Magnús Scheving	Story by : Magnús Scheving; Written by : Magnús Scheving, Máni Svavarsson, and Noah Zachary	October 1, 2007	217
Stephanie is invited to join a famous dance school far, far away, meaning she has to leave LazyTown. However, this is just a scheme by Robbie to get rid of her and Sportacus.
52	"Sportacus Saves the Toys"	Magnús Scheving	Story by : Magnús Scheving; Written by : Magnús Scheving, Máni Svavarsson, and Noah Zachary	October 15, 2007	218
Robbie Rotten creates an invention that pulls the world's toys away. Sportacus must visit China and France to get the toys back and teaches everyone that you don't always need toys to play.

=== Season 3 (2013) ===
No.	Title	Directed by	Written by	Original release date	Prod. code
53	"Roboticus"	Magnús Scheving	Magnús Scheving, Máni Svavarsson, and Ólafur S.K. Þorvaldz	March 13, 2013	301
When Robbie Rotten overhears Pixel saying that only a robot could be better than Sportacus, he constructs a robotic version of him called Roboticus (Asgeir Helgi Magnusson) to get him out of LazyTown for good. The only thing that can settle everything is a race!
54	"The Greatest Gift"	Sigvaldi J. Kárason	Magnús Scheving, Mark Valenti, and Ólafur S.K. Þorvaldz	April 12, 2013	302
It's Ziggy's Birthday, and everyone is invited - even Robbie Rotten. However, Stingy doesn't want to go because he doesn't have a present for him.
55	"Little Pink Riding Hood"	Sigvaldi J. Kárason	Magnús Scheving and Ólafur S.K. Þorvaldz	May 2, 2013	303
Robbie Rotten is on the verge to ruin Stephanie's Sports Candy surprise for Sportacus by dressing up as the slightly above average hero himself. But when Sportacus' airship malfunctions with the villain on board, Pixel must use the surprise to get Sportacus out of his sugar meltdown caused by Robbie's Candy Apple before its too late.
56	"Scavenger Hunt"	Sigvaldi J. Kárason	Magnús Scheving, Mark Valenti, and Ólafur S.K. Þorvaldz	June 20, 2013	304
The kids join Mayor Meanswell's scout group, but Robbie, disguised as a scout master, replaces the treasure with junk food, and soon gets trapped in a recycling machine with Sportacus.
57	"Who's Who?"	Magnús Scheving	Magnús Scheving, Máni Svavarsson, Mark Valenti, and Ólafur S.K. Þorvaldz	July 11, 2013	305
Fed up with Stephanie's dancing, Robbie Rotten creates a clone of her who says mean things about the kids, to which the kids are convinced it's Stephanie herself. Only a dance-off will prove who's the real one!
58	"Purple Panther"	Sigvaldi J. Kárason	Magnús Scheving and Ólafur S.K. Þorvaldz	August 8, 2013 (Part 1) September 11, 2013 (Part 2)	306 307
LazyTown is opening up a new museum, and Stingy asks Sportacus if he could donate his crystal. Soon, it goes missing and Robbie Rotten is the victim.
59	"The Blue Knight"	Magnús Scheving	Magnús Scheving, Ólafur S.K. Þorvaldz, and Mark Valenti	September 11, 2013	308
After the kids learn about the story of the Blue Knight by the mayor, they play a knight game with Sportacus dressing up as the Blue Knight himself. Robbie Rotten on the other hand is after everyone's sports candy, and after making a Dragon, he disguises himself as the purple knight and challenges Sportacus to a duel.
60	"The First Day of Summer"	Sigvaldi J. Kárason	Magnús Scheving, Mark Valenti, Ólafur S.K. Þorvaldz, and Máni Svavarsson	September 26, 2013	309
Robbie Rotten thinks that everyone has left LazyTown forever when they all go to the beach to celebrate the first day of summer. However, he soon realizes that this may not be as great as he dreamt up.
61	"Chef Rottenfood"	Óskar Jónasson	Magnús Scheving and Ólafur S.K. Þorvaldz	October 2, 2013	310
World famous Mediterranean chef Pablo Fantastico (Jóhannes Haukur Jóhannesson) is coming to LazyTown to show everyone his healthy recipes. However, Robbie Rotten is after to stop his healthiness and disguises himself as him. Only a cook-off can prove which is the real Pablo Fantastico.
62	"Breakfast at Stephanie's"	Magnús Scheving	Magnús Scheving, Ólafur S.K. Þorvaldz, and Máni Svavarsson	October 23, 2013	311
Robbie Rotten takes an invisibility helmet Pixel made and use it to stop Sportacus. It's up to the kids to stop him.
63	"The Lazy Cup"	Magnús Scheving	Magnús Scheving, Ólafur S.K. Þorvaldz, Máni Svavarsson, and Mark Valenti	November 13, 2013	312
It's the day of the Lazy Cup, pitting Stephanie's team against Robbie Rotten's team, with the winner receiving a golden trophy and a wish, or for Robbie, his wish of making Sportacus leave forever.
64	"The Holiday Spirit"	Magnús Scheving	Magnús Scheving, Ólafur S.K. Þorvaldz, Mark Valenti, and Máni Svavarsson	December 12, 2013	313
It's the holiday season in LazyTown, but Santa Claus (Ólafur S.K. Þorvaldz) arrives empty-handed. As the kids find his missing presents, they learn that you don't always need presents to get into the Christmas spirit.

=== Season 4 (2014) ===
No.	Title	Directed by	Written by	Original release date	Prod. code
65	"Let's Go to the Moon"	Sigvaldi J. Kárason	Magnús Scheving and Ólafur S.K. Þorvaldz	January 10, 2014	401
The kids are playing an astronauts game which inspires Robbie Rotten to move to the moon in order to get away from Sportacus and the noisy kids. Robbie flies to the moon closely followed by the kids who accidentally mistake him for an alien and back to Earth along with the supervillain on board but they run into trouble and it is again up to Sportacus to save him.
66	"The Last SportsCandy"	Magnús Scheving	Magnús Scheving and Ólafur S.K. Þorvaldz	January 31, 2014	402
Robbie Rotten decides to go back in time to stop Johnny SportsCandyseed (Joi Johannsson) from planting the SportsCandy trees. Sportacus and the kids need to stop the supervillain before all the SportsCandy in LazyTown becomes missing forever. The whole past and future of LazyTown and the whole universe depends on Sportacus and the kids.
67	"Secret Friend Day"	Sigvaldi J. Kárason	Magnús Scheving, Ólafur S.K. Þorvaldz, and Máni Svavarsson	February 14, 2014	403
When the kids play a Secret Friend game, a misunderstanding makes Trixie lose trust in Stephanie and leave town. With Sportacus away on an expedition, Trixie, Stephanie and Robbie get lost at sea, when the supervillain was having his summer vacation. Will they be able to trust one another, and save themselves from getting sunk and their friendship?
68	"New Kid in Town"	Magnús Scheving	Magnús Scheving, Máni Svavarsson, Ólafur S.K. Þorvaldz, and Mark Valenti	March 6, 2014	404
Pinocchio (Sigurður Þór Óskarsson) appears in LazyTown to help Robbie Rotten lie to the kids, convincing them to eat sugary gooey lollipops, Stephanie and Sportacus are in a race against time to bring them SportsCandy and help them regain their energy.
69	"Time to Learn"	Óskar Jónasson	Magnús Scheving and Ólafur S.K. Þorvaldz	April 4, 2014	405
It's the last day of school and the kids are excited to finish the big last exam. But when the supervillain Robbie Rotten needs to go to school to get himself proclaimed as the world's top supervillain, his cheating in the last day of exam gets Stephanie into trouble.
70	"Princess Stephanie"	Sigvaldi J. Kárason	Magnús Scheving, Ólafur S.K. Þorvaldz, and Mark Valenti	May 23, 2014	406
Robbie Rotten discovers that to make LazyTown lazy again, he needs to get rid of Stephanie, who wants to be a real princess. So Robbie grants her wish and disallows her to leave her castle.
71	"Ziggy's Talking Teddy"	Sigvaldi J. Kárason	Magnús Scheving, Ólafur S.K. Þorvaldz, and Mark Valenti	June 12, 2014	407
When the Mayor hears that Bobby Bird is coming to town, he tries to call him but instead Robbie Rotten gets the call and pretends to be him. He challenges Ziggy, who is terrible at basketball, to compete against him. But Ziggy practices and gets support from his friends and his teddy bear version of Sportacus named "Teddycus". But Robbie switches Ziggy's nice talking teddy bear with another but mean teddy bear which hands him bad support. Can Ziggy learn how to play basketball and compete against Robbie? It's now or never!
72	"The Wizard of LazyTown"	Magnús Scheving	Magnús Scheving and Ólafur S.K. Þorvaldz	July 21, 2014	408
When the Mayor and Stephanie go away butterfly watching and with Sportacus away to help them, Robbie Rotten disguises himself as a wizard and makes a potion and place a sleeping curse to make the kids lazy for all eternity.
73	"The Baby Troll"	Magnús Scheving	Magnús Scheving, Ólafur S.K. Þorvaldz, and Máni Svavarsson	August 4, 2014	409
The kids are having a sleepover and the mayor tells them a bedtime story about a baby troll. Ziggy decides he wants a pet troll so the kids venture into the mountains and find a troll named LuLu (Hilmar Guðjónsson, voiced by Ilmur Kristjánsdóttir) who begins to eat all of the sports equipment. Much to his delight, Robbie disguises himself as a troll catcher as he thinks a bigger troll will eat more sports equipment but will the kids be able to return LuLu back home before she eats most of LazyTown and stops Robbie once and for all?
74	"The Fortune Teller"	Sigvaldi J. Kárason	Magnús Scheving and Ólafur S.K. Þorvaldz	September 26, 2014	410
Ziggy and Stingy put on a puppet show about a fortune teller which inspires Robbie Rotten to disguise himself as one to make the kids believe that there will be no Sportacus in the future. When Robbie Rotten tries to tempt Sportacus with a sugar apple, and even worse, placed a sleeping curse to make the hero fall into an eternal slumber, it is up to the kids to rescue him from Robbie's curse for the fourth time.
75	"Ghost Stoppers"	Óskar Jónasson	Magnús Scheving, Ólafur S.K. Þorvaldz, and Mark Valenti	September 26, 2014	411
During school, Trixie acts as a ghost and scares her classmates especially Ziggy. So Robbie Rotten decides to disguise himself as a ghost to scare the kids even more from the school. Meanwhile, the kids try to get rid of the ghost by squirting it with slime after a sports candy experiment mistake.
76	"Robbie's Dream Team"	Magnús Scheving	Magnús Scheving and Ólafur S.K. Þorvaldz	October 3, 2014	412
Stephanie and Stingy are playing spies. Robbie Rotten designs his own dream team, Bobby (Björn Thors), Tobby (Snorri Engilbertsson), and Flobby Rotten (Bergur Þór Ingólfsson) who successfully hands Sportacus a sugar apple and placed a curse for the last time and capture him. The kids must wake Sportacus up from his slumber with a real apple, break Robbie's curse and rescue the superhero before it's too late.
77	"Mystery of the Pyramid"	Magnús Scheving and Sigvaldi J. Kárason	Magnús Scheving, Ólafur S.K. Þorvaldz, and Mark Valenti	October 13, 2014	413
Robbie Rotten orders an Egyptian pyramid with the last hope of trapping Sportacus inside, but the kids ruin his plans and Stingy makes things go crazy. Robbie disguises himself as a mummy to scare the kids. But will Sportacus be able to save everyone?
