= LazyTown Extra =

Pre-school children's television series

- Title card
- Also known as: LazyTown Action Time! (US/CAN)
- Genre: Live action
- Created by: Magnús Scheving
- Based on: LazyTown Áfram Latibær! by Magnús Scheving
- Starring: Ronald Binion; Magnús Scheving; Jodi Eichelberger; Guðmundur Þór Kárason; Stefán Karl Stefánsson; Sarah Burgess; Lorraine Parsloe; David Matthew Feldman; Julie Westwood; Caroline Dalton; Julianna Rose Mauriello; Jackson Elton
- Countries of origin: United Kingdom; Iceland
- Original language: English
- No. of series: 1
- No. of episodes: 26

Production
- Executive producers: Magnús Scheving; Magnús Ragnarsson
- Producer: Julian Essex-Spurrier
- Editor: Kimberly Pena
- Running time: 12-14 minutes
- Production companies: LazyTown Entertainment; BBC Scotland

Original release
- Network: CBeebies
- Release: 15 September – 28 October 2008

Related
- LazyTown

LazyTown Extra (Icelandic: Latibær: Action Time!) (also known in other countries as LazyTown: Action Time!) is a British-Icelandic children's television series produced by LazyTown Entertainment, based on the original LazyTown series, functioning as a spin-off. It first aired on 15 September 2008, showing on CBeebies, along with the original series.

== Synopsis ==
LazyTown Extra is formatted as a sketch show featuring the LazyTown characters in an assortment of short sketches, with the main focus being on Ziggy, as he travels to various parts of the United Kingdom looking at many different athletic activities.

=== Segments ===
- Super Moves – Sportacus showcases a move the viewer can do at home.
- Ziggy's Introduction – Ziggy lands somewhere in the United Kingdom and introduces the episode's topic to the audience.
- LazyTown's Big News – Mayor Milford Meanswell and Bessie Busybody give out a fact in relation to the episode's topic. (Odd-numbered episodes)
- Trixie and Stephanie – Set within Mayor Milford's house, Stephanie teaches Trixie something. (Even-numbered episodes)
- Meeting the Kids – Ziggy meets two or three kids and confuses the episode's topic for something he enjoys.
- Stephanie's Moves – Stephanie teaches the audience how to do dance moves to a LazyTown song. (Odd-numbered episodes)
- Big Activity – Ziggy watches the children doing the topic, sometimes doing it himself. Instrumentals of LazyTown songs play in the background.
- Stingy and Milford – Set at Mayor Milford's house or the Town Hall, Stingy complains about a topic, while Milford teaches him advice that Stingy can take the other way. (Appears after the Big Activity in odd-number episodes and the Children meeting in even-numbered episodes).
- Sportacus' Moves – Set within the LazyTown Sports Hall, Sportacus teaches a group of children wearing Sports Clothes how to do a move together. (Even-numbered episodes)
- Ziggy's Questions – Ziggy asks questions to the kids about the episode's topic.
- Sportacus Challenge – Pixel sets Sportacus with an athletic challenge. (Odd-numbered episodes)
- Robbie's World Records – Robbie Rotten attempts to do a world record in relation to the episode's topic, to disastrous results. (Even-numbered episodes)
- Ziggy's Goodbye – Ziggy says goodbye to the viewers, and the episode then ends.

In the LazyTown Action Time! version, the Ziggy segments are shorter and are set on a white screen, voiced by his original voice actor.

== Cast ==
Despite the show being produced for the UK market (as the series was semi-redubbed for the UK market), only Lorraine Parsloe reprises her role as Ziggy, due to his segments being produced in the United Kingdom itself. The original American voice actors for the puppets reprise their voice roles in the series. However, in the Action Time! version, Guðmundur Þór Kárason reprises as Ziggy.

=== Live actors ===
- Magnús Scheving as Sportacus
- Stefán Karl Stefánsson as Robbie Rotten
- Julianna Rose Mauriello as Stephanie

=== Puppets ===
- Lorraine Parsloe as the voice of Ziggy
  - Guðmundur Þór Kárason as the voice and puppeteer of Ziggy (Action Time! version)
- Jodi Eichelberger as Stingy
- Sarah Burgess as Trixie and Ziggy (Puppeteer)
- Ronald Binion as Pixel
- David Matthew Feldman as Mayor Milford Meanswell
- Julie Westwood as Bessie Busybody and Ziggy (Puppeteer)

=== Other ===
- Caroline Dalton as the Airship Voice
- Antonía Lárusdóttir, Anita Rós Þorsteinsdóttir, Fjóla Brynjarsdottir, Rachel Hilson and Isis Mullen-Hansen as Dancers

== Production ==
The show was filmed in Spring and Summer 2008.

== Episodes ==
No.	Title	Directed by	Written by	Original release date	Prod. code
1	"Goal!"	Sigvaldi J. Kárason and Mike Prince	Magnus Scheving, Mani Svavarsson, Mark Valenti and Sara Daddy	September 15, 2008	301
Sportacus shows his soccer moves in his airship, Mayor Meanswell and Miss Busybody tell the story of how Uruguay won the first ever World Cup, Stephanie demonstrates the dance moves to the song "Playtime", the mayor tells Stingy how you only need one soccer ball and eleven soccer players to play soccer, Pixel sets Sportacus a challenge to do a back flip and kick a soccer ball at the same time, and Ziggy finds out facts about football. Note: This is the series debut. Song: "Playtime"
2	"I Love Sportscandy"	Sigvaldi J. Kárason and Mike Prince	Magnus Scheving, Mani Svavarsson, Mark Valenti and Sara Daddy	September 16, 2008	302
Sportacus shows us "the Sportacus move" in his airship, Stephanie and Trixie make a castle made of apples, Stingy tells the mayor that the secret to life is to eat fruits and vegetables to stay healthy, Sportacus and loads of kids toss and catch oranges in the sports hall, Robbie attempts to juggle sports candy but gets stuck in a pile of apples, and Ziggy goes fruit picking.
3	"Ready, Set, Go!"	Sigvaldi J. Kárason and Mike Prince	Magnus Scheving, Mani Svavarsson, Mark Valenti and Sara Daddy	September 17, 2008	303
Sportacus shows us different styles of running in his airship, Mayor Meanswell and Bessie tell a news story on how the first marathon was held in Greece over 2,500 years ago, Stephanie teaches the dance moves to the song "No One's Lazy in LazyTown", the mayor teaches Stingy how to use a baton in a race, Pixel challenges Sportacus to run around LazyTown in ten seconds, and Ziggy learns about running. Song: "No One's Lazy in LazyTown"
4	"Fantastic Gymnastics!"	Sigvaldi J. Kárason and Mike Prince	Magnus Scheving, Mani Svavarsson, Mark Valenti and Sara Daddy	September 18, 2008	304
Sportacus shows us a handstand in his airship, Stephanie and Trixie makes birthday gifts for Ziggy made out of Sportscandy like a pirate ship and a race car, the mayor tells Stingy how you need to practice everyday to be good at something, Sportacus and loads of kids do the spider stretch in the sports hall, Robbie tries to set a world record for walking on his hands the longest, and Ziggy learns about gymnastics.
5	"Splish Splash"	Sigvaldi J. Kárason and Mike Prince	Magnus Scheving, Mani Svavarsson, Mark Valenti and Sara Daddy	September 19, 2008	305
Sportacus pretends he's on the beach swimming and surfing in his airship, the mayor and Bessie tell a news story on flying fish and swimming birds, Stephanie demonstrates the dance moves for the first part of the "Bing Bang" song, the mayor tells Stingy how you can use water wings to help you swim, Pixel sets Sportacus a challenge to jump up and grab an apple from a tree, and Ziggy learns about swimming. Note: Stephanie sang the first part of "Bing Bang". Song: "Bing Bang (1st part)"
6	"Cleanup!"	Sigvaldi J. Kárason and Mike Prince	Magnus Scheving, Mani Svavarsson, Mark Valenti and Sara Daddy	September 22, 2008	306
Sportacus shows us a double move in his airship, Stephanie tells Trixie how you should wash an apple before you eat it, the mayor tells Stingy that you should always wash your hands before you eat, Sportacus and loads of kids do the 2 for 1 move in the sports hall, Robbie tries to set a world record for fastest tidying by a villain, and Ziggy learns about washing your hands.
7	"Pedal Power"	Sigvaldi J. Kárason and Mike Prince	Magnus Scheving, Mani Svavarsson, Mark Valenti and Sara Daddy	September 23, 2008	307
Sportacus does a forward roll in his airship, the mayor and Bessie tells a news story about how bicycles were first made in Europe over 150 years ago, Stephanie teaches the dance moves to the second part of the "Bing Bang" song, Milford tells Stingy that he should wear a helmet while riding a bike, Pixel challenges Sportacus to do a throw-in with a soccer ball in a cool way, and Ziggy learns about bike tricks. Note: Stephanie sang the second part of "Bing Bang". Song: "Bing Bang (2nd part)"
8	"Picnic Time"	Sigvaldi J. Kárason and Mike Prince	Magnus Scheving, Mani Svavarsson, Mark Valenti and Sara Daddy	September 24, 2008	308
Sportacus shows his special pushup in his airship, Stephanie gives Trixie coconut juice to try, Milford tells Stingy how to many sweets can make you feel strange and tired, Sportacus and loads of kids do robot moves in the sports hall, Robbie tries to make a drink for energy, and Ziggy goes to a sportscandy picnic.
9	"Let's Dance"	Sigvaldi J. Kárason and Mike Prince	Magnus Scheving, Mani Svavarsson, Mark Valenti and Sara Daddy	September 25, 2008	309
Sportacus does a power jump in his airship, Milford and Bessie report on what the most popular dance is, Stephanie teaches the dance moves to the song "I Wanna Dance", the mayor and Stingy make up a new dance called the Stingy Wiggle, Pixel sets Sportacus a challenge to do a somersault with a double spin, and Ziggy learns about dancing. Song: "I Wanna Dance"
10	"Smart Art"	Sigvaldi J. Kárason and Mike Prince	Magnus Scheving, Mani Svavarsson, Mark Valenti and Sara Daddy	September 26, 2008	310
Sportacus does a split in his airship, Stephanie and Trixie make a pizza face for a sculpture, Milford tells Stingy how it's good to share, Sportacus and loads of kids play the copycat game in the sports hall, Robbie tries to set a world record for the most famous painting, and Ziggy learns about art.
11	"Slam Dunk!"	Sigvaldi J. Kárason and Mike Prince	Magnus Scheving, Mani Svavarsson, Mark Valenti and Sara Daddy	September 29, 2008	311
Sportacus does eight basketball jumps in his airship, Milford and Bessie tell the story of how basketball was first played in Canada in 1892, Stephanie shows the dance moves to the song "Time to Play", Milford shows Stingy how you can play basketball with a pair of socks and a can, Pixel challenges Sportacus to simultaneously do a somersault and shoot a basketball through a hoop, and Ziggy learns about basketball. Song: "Time to Play"
12	"Let's Jump!"	Sigvaldi J. Kárason and Mike Prince	Magnus Scheving, Mani Svavarsson, Mark Valenti and Sara Daddy	October 3, 2008	312
Sportacus jumps in his airship, Stephanie and Trixie grade their fruits, Milford tells Stingy that you don't need gold shoes to practice, Sportacus and loads of kids jump in the sports hall, Robbie tries to set a world record for most jumping, and Ziggy learns about the long jump.
13	"Teethtastic!"	Sigvaldi J. Kárason and Mike Prince	Magnus Scheving, Mani Svavarsson, Mark Valenti and Sara Daddy	October 6, 2008	313
Sportacus brushes his teeth in his airship, the mayor and Bessie tell the story of how the first toothbrush was invented in China over 500 years ago and was made with bamboo and the hair from the back of a pig's neck, Stephanie teaches the dance moves to the song "Twenty Times Time", the mayor tells Stingy how you should brush your teeth more than one time up and one time down, Pixel sets Sportacus a challenge to get from LazyTown to his airship in ten seconds, and Ziggy finds out about brushing his teeth. Song: "Twenty Times Time"
14	"Outdoor Action!"	Sigvaldi J. Kárason and Mike Prince	Magnus Scheving, Mani Svavarsson, Mark Valenti and Sara Daddy	October 7, 2008	314
Sportacus does freestyle moves in his airship, Stephanie and Trixie bring sports candy and cupcakes to the park to eat during and after the frisbee game, the mayor tells Stingy that everything gets dirty, Sportacus along with many kids pretend to fly his airship in the sports hall, Robbie tries to set a world record for longest Frisbee throw, and Ziggy learns about the Frisbee.
15	"Let's Roll!"	Sigvaldi J. Kárason and Mike Prince	Magnus Scheving, Mani Svavarsson, Mark Valenti and Sara Daddy	October 8, 2008	315
Sportacus does pushups in his airship, the mayor and Bessie tell a news story about when and where the first skateboard was made, Stephanie teaches the moves to the song "Techno Generation", the mayor teaches Stingy how to use a skateboard, Pixel challenges Sportacus to do a one-arm handstand, and Ziggy learns to skate. Song: "Techno Generation"
16	"Great Greens"	Sigvaldi J. Kárason and Mike Prince	Magnus Scheving, Mani Svavarsson, Mark Valenti and Sara Daddy	October 9, 2008	316
Sportacus prepares for Sports Day, Stephanie and Trixie sets up the design of the sports field for Sports Day, the mayor teaches Stingy that the fruits you like to eat aren't always the color you like, Sportacus and many kids show a great way to start the day in the sports hall, Robbie tries to set a world record in sleeping, and Ziggy learns how to grow and pick vegetables to make a salad. Song: "Go Green"
17	"Jump Up!"	Sigvaldi J. Kárason and Mike Prince	Magnus Scheving, Mani Svavarsson, Mark Valenti and Sara Daddy	October 10, 2008	317
Sportacus does "super jumps" in his airship, the mayor and Bessie do a news report on the athleticism of the flea, Stephanie teaches the dance moves to the song "You Are a Pirate", the mayor teaches Stingy that you can go to a costume party dressed up as any character you want, Pixel challenges Sportacus to jump over the biggest wall in LazyTown, and Ziggy learns the high jump. Song: "You Are a Pirate"
18	"It's Hip to Skip"	Sigvaldi J. Kárason and Mike Prince	Magnus Scheving, Mani Svavarsson, Mark Valenti and Sara Daddy	October 13, 2008	318
Sportacus exercises with a jumprope in his airship, Stephanie and Trixie eat oatmeal with milk and fresh and dried fruits, Mayor Meanswell shows Stingy that you don't have to beat everybody to have fun in sports games and that taking part in sports is what makes it fun, Sportacus and loads of kids demonstrate how to jump rope in the sports hall, Robbie tries to set a world record in jumping rope, and Ziggy learns about jumping rope.
19	"Deep Sleep"	Sigvaldi J. Kárason and Mike Prince	Magnus Scheving, Mani Svavarsson, Mark Valenti and Sara Daddy	October 14, 2008	319
Sportacus does power stretching in his airship, the mayor and Bessie report that children need at least ten hours of sleep every night, Stephanie teaches the dance moves to "The Spooky Song", the mayor teaches Stingy that even though sleep is important; you can't sleep all the time, Pixel challenges Sportacus to hit a golf ball from the airship, and Ziggy learns about sleeping. Song: "The Spooky Song"
20	"Kick Tricks!"	Sigvaldi J. Kárason and Mike Prince	Magnus Scheving, Mani Svavarsson, Mark Valenti and Sara Daddy	October 15, 2008	320
Sportacus does soccer tricks in his airship, Stephanie and Trixie add cut-up fruits to water to make "sports water", the mayor teaches Stingy that you need more than one drop of water a day, Sportacus and some kids do football tricks with a balloon in the sports hall, Robbie tries to set a world record for the most soccer balls kicked at the same time, and Ziggy learns how to play soccer.
21	"Do Re Mi!"	Sigvaldi J. Kárason and Mike Prince	Magnus Scheving, Mani Svavarsson, Mark Valenti and Sara Daddy	October 16, 2008	321
Sportacus does jumping jacks in his airship, the mayor and Bessie do a news report about instruments, Stephanie teaches the dance moves to the song "When We Play in a Band", the mayor and Stingy practice playing the flute, Pixel sets Sportacus a challenge to do a cool basketball trick, and Ziggy learns about instruments. Song: "When We Play in a Band"
22	"Bounce Away"	Sigvaldi J. Kárason and Mike Prince	Magnus Scheving, Mani Svavarsson, Mark Valenti and Sara Daddy	October 21, 2008	322
Sportacus does power lifts in his airship, Stephanie shows the mayor that eating sports candy will give him energy, Stingy gets worried about his birthday, Sportacus and loads of kids do animal moves in the sports hall, Robbie tries to set a world record in acrobatic jumps, and Ziggy learns about all things bouncy.
23	"Super Speed"	Sigvaldi J. Kárason and Mike Prince	Magnus Scheving, Mani Svavarsson, Mark Valenti and Sara Daddy	October 22, 2008	323
Sportacus gets speedy in his airship as he races around the globe and back, the mayor and Bessie tell a news story about the fastest animal, Stephanie teaches the moves to the song "Energy", Stingy finishes his homework way too fast and wonders why he did so poorly on his test, Pixel challenges Sportacus to do his helicopter move on a wall, and Ziggy learns about bikes. Song: "Energy"
24	"Tall Stories"	Sigvaldi J. Kárason and Mike Prince	Magnus Scheving, Mani Svavarsson, Mark Valenti and Sara Daddy	October 23, 2008	324
Sportacus does a floor twist in his airship, Stephanie and Trixie eat sports candy to help them focus on their studying, Stingy tells the mayor that he is worried about wearing out his books, Sportacus and loads of kids do "the Sportacus move" in the sports hall, Robbie attempts to set a world record in reading, and Ziggy learns about reading.
25	"Ice Is Nice"	Sigvaldi J. Kárason and Mike Prince	Magnus Scheving, Mani Svavarsson, Mark Valenti and Sara Daddy	October 24, 2008	325
Sportacus does balancing in his airship, Mayor Meanswell and Bessie Busybody present the news about scientists finding the oldest ice skates, Stephanie demonstrates the dance steps to the song "Snow, Give Me Snow", Stingy wants to borrow the mayor's mattress so he won't hurt himself when he goes ice-skating, Pixel sets Sportacus a challenge to do a "super mega jump", and Ziggy learns about sports on ice. Song: "Snow, Give Me Snow"
26	"One, Two, Ski!"	Sigvaldi J. Kárason and Mike Prince	Magnus Scheving, Mani Svavarsson, Mark Valenti and Sara Daddy	October 27, 2008	326
Sportacus does skiing and snowboarding moves in his airship, Stephanie and Trixie make a sports candy snowman, Stingy tells the mayor that he is frightened of the snow, Sportacus and loads of kids practice their skiing moves in the sports hall, Robbie Rotten tries to set a world record for the highest ski jump, and Ziggy learns about skiing. Note 1: This is last episode in which Stephanie is played by Julianna Rose Mauriello. Note 2: This is last episode of the LazyTown series before the series being renewed for a third and fourth season. Note 3: This is the series finale.

== See also ==
- Television in Iceland
