= List of LazyTown home video releases =

This is a list of LazyTown DVDs that have been released. So far, these have been released in the United States, the United Kingdom, Germany, Iceland, Denmark, Finland, Norway, Sweden, Spain, and Australia.

For a list of episodes that have aired in English, see List of LazyTown episodes.

== Region 1 ==
=== Northern America ===
Eight DVDs have been released for retail in Northern America, as of October 30, 2012. The volumes from 2005 and 2006 were released by Paramount Home Media Distribution on behalf of Nickelodeon and the volumes from 2012 were released by NCircle Entertainment. In addition, a promotional sampler disc was released to Kmart stores in 2005. All discs feature Dolby Digital 2.0 audio and a 1.33:1 aspect ratio.

Name	Release date	Number of episodes	Episode titles
New Superhero	August 16, 2005	3	LazyTown's New Superhero; Cry Dinosaur; Dr. Rottenstein
Surprise Santa	October 11, 2005	4	LazyTown's Surprise Santa; Ziggy's Alien; Miss Roberta; The Laziest Town
DVD Sampler	2005	1	Sports Day; Music Video: Cooking By the Book; Music Video: Lazy Scouts
Robbie's Greatest Misses	February 14, 2006	4	Robbie's Greatest Misses; Rottenbeard; Defeeted; Lazy Scouts
Sports Candy Festival	May 16, 2006	4	Sports Candy Festival; Happy Brush Day; Play Day; Sportafake
Records Day	July 11, 2006	4	Records Day; Hero For a Day; Zap It!; Secret Agent Zero
Swiped Sweets	September 5, 2006	4	Swiped Sweets; Dancing Duel; Remote Control; My Treehouse; Music Video: Play in a Band
Welcome To LazyTown	May 15, 2012	3	Welcome to LazyTown; Dr. Rottenstein; Sports Day
Super Sports Show	October 30, 2012	4	Records Day; Sportafake; Soccer Sucker; Sportacus on the Move

=== Episodes on Nick Jr. compilation DVDs ===
Name	Release date	Number of episodes	Episode title
Nick Jr. Favorites Vol. 1	May 24, 2005	1	Sports Day
Nick Jr. Favorites Vol. 2	October 18, 2005	1	Sleepless in LazyTown
Nick Jr. Favorites Vol. 3	February 7, 2006	1	Soccer Sucker
Nick Jr. Favorites Vol. 4	June 6, 2006	1	Prince Stingy

== Region 2 ==
=== United Kingdom ===
In the U.K., eleven DVDs have been released as of May 23, 2011, containing a total of 50 unique episodes. These DVDs mostly feature five episodes of the show (one DVD features four episodes, and another one features six episodes), unlike the standard four episodes for other regions. They also use the U.K. English voice dubbing, are in widescreen format, and feature subtitles and menus that are more interactive than in other regions.

Name	Release date	Number of episodes	Episode titles
Welcome to LazyTown!	September 11, 2006	5	Welcome to LazyTown; Sports Day; Rottenbeard; Defeeted; Dr. Rottenstein
Surprise Santa and Other Stories	November 13, 2006	5	LazyTown’s Surprise Santa; Miss Roberta; Sports Candy Festival; Sportacus Who?; Robbie’s Greatest Misses
Anyone Can Be A Hero!	February 19, 2007	4	Hero for a Day; Sleepless in LazyTown; Cry Dinosaur; LazyTown's New Superhero
No One's Lazy In LazyTown!	April 20, 2007	5	Sportafake; Lazy Scouts; Records Day; The Laziest Town; Soccer Sucker
Go, Go, LazyTown!	October 29, 2007	5	Rockin' Robbie; Remote Control; LazyTown's Greatest Hits; Little Sportacus; Dancing Duel
Once Upon a Time in LazyTown!	June 16, 2008	5	Once Upon a Time; Prince Stingy; Dancing Dreams; Haunted Castle; The Lazy Genie
Snow Monster and Other Stories	November 3, 2008	5	The LazyTown Snow Monster; Friends Forever; The LazyTown Circus; Double Trouble; Sportacus Saves the Toys
The LazyTown Collection: Welcome to LazyTown!, Anyone Can Be a Hero! No One's Lazy in LazyTown!, Go, Go, LazyTown!	July 20, 2009	19	Welcome to LazyTown; Sports Day; Rottenbeard; Defeeted; Dr. Rottenstein; Hero For a Day; Sleepless in LazyTown; Cry Dinosaur; LazyTown's New Superhero; Sportafake; Lazy Scouts; Record's Day; The Laziest Town; Soccer Sucker; Rockin' Robbie; Remote Control; LazyTown's Greatest Hits; Little Sportacus; Dancing Duel
Sportacus on the Move!	October 26, 2009	5	Sportacus on the Move!; Ziggy's Alien; The Great Crystal Caper; Zap It!; Swiped Sweets
The Christmas collection: Surprise Santa and other stories, snow monster and other stories	October 26, 2009	10	Lazytown's Surprise Santa; Miss Roberta; Sports Candy Festival; Sportacus Who?; Robbie's Greatest Misses; The LazyTown Snow Monster; Friends Forever; The LazyTown Circus; Double Trouble; Sportacus Saves the Toys
The Sun DVD Promo	December 8, 2009	2	LazyTown's Surprise Santa; Miss Roberta
Football Crazy!	June 6, 2010	5	The Lazy Rockets; Birthday Surprise; Happy Brush Day; Energy Book; Pixel TV; Soccer Sucker
There's Always a Way	May 23, 2011	5	Play Day; Trash Trouble; Dear Diary; Pixelspix; Secret Agent Zero

=== Germany ===
Thirteen DVDs have been released in Germany as of November 7, 2008, containing a total of 52 episodes and one bonus music video. They are all in fullscreen and feature a single audio track in German.

Name	Release date	Number of episodes	Episode titles
LazyTown, Vol. 1: Willkommen in LazyTown	October 20, 2006	4	Willkommen in LazyTown; Dr. Fauligstein; Der Sporttag; Held für einen Tag
LazyTown, Vol. 2: Verwirrte Füße	October 20, 2006	4	Verwirrte Füße; Räuberbart; Hilfe, ein Saurier!; Wer hat den Kristall?
LazyTown, Vol. 3: Weihnachten in LazyTown	December 1, 2006	4	Weihnachten in LazyTown; Schlaflos in LazyTown; Fähnlein Faulheit; Mein Baumhaus; Bing Bang (music video)
LazyTown, Vol. 4: Der Zahnbürsten-Geburtstag	March 9, 2007	4	Der Geklaute Kuchen; Der Zahnbürsten-Geburtstag; Pixelspaß; Der Doppelgänger
LazyTown, Vol. 5: Faules Spiel	March 9, 2007	4	Die Faulste Stadt; Faules Spiel; Liebes Tagebuch; Die Überraschungsparty
LazyTown, vol 6 Der Powersnack Festival	October 12, 2007	3	Das Powersnack Festival; LazyTown's Neuer Superheld tale 1; LazyTown's Neuer Superheld tale 2
Lazytown, vol 7 Der Speiltag	October 12, 2007	4	Der Speiltag; Die Fernbedienung; Geheimagent Null; Unsichtbar
LazyTown, vol 8 Neuer Rekord	November 9, 2007	4	Neuer Rekord!; Ziggys Alien; Hilfe, wer bin ich?; Prinz Meini
LazyTown, vol 9 Rreddies Grobte Misserfolge	November 9, 2007	4	Freddies größte Misserfolge; Das Tanz-Duell; LazyTowns größte Hits; Sportacus, der Superheld
LazyTown, vol 10 Der LazyTown Zirkus	September 19, 2008	5	Der LazyTown Zirkus; Freddie Rockt; LazyTown Digital; Das LazyTown-Derby; Das Spukschloss
LazyTown, vol 11 Der Faule Flaschengeist	October 12, 2008	4	Der faule Flaschengeist; Klein-Sportacus; Lehrer-Lümmeleien; Müllgewitter
LazyTown, vol 12 Der Energie-Buch	November 7, 2008	5	Das Energie-Buch; Das Schneemonster; Magnetisch angezogen; LazyTown TV; Es war einmal
LazyTown, vol 13 Freunde für Immer	November 7, 2008	4	Freunde für Immer; Eine neue Regel; Der Traum vom Tanzen; Geburtstags-Überraschung

=== Denmark ===
Ten DVDs have been released in Denmark as of March 6, 2007, containing a total of 34 episodes. They are all in Widescreen. All the Scandinavian DVDs feature four audio tracks: Danish, Finnish, Norwegian, and Swedish.

Name	Release date	Number of episodes	Episode titles
LazyTown 1: Velkommen til LazyTown	November 7, 2006	4	Velkommen til LazyTown; Doktor Rättenstein; Idrætsdagen; Dagens helt
LazyTown 2: Den uhyggelige dinosaurus	November 7, 2006	4	De tossede sko; Råddenskæg; Den Uhyggelige dinosaurus; Den Forsvundne krystal
LazyTown 3: Søvnløst i LazyTown	December 5, 2006	3	Søvnløs i LazyTown; Dovne spejdere; Træhytten
LazyTown 4: Stjålne søde sager	December 5, 2006	3	Stjålne søde sager; En børste til den søde tand; Pixels hjemmeside
LazyTown 5: Fodbold på hjernen	January 23, 2007	4	Sportafake; Verdens dovneste by; Fodbold på hjernen; Kære dagbog
LazyTown 6: LazyTowns nye superhelt	January 23, 2007	3	Frøken Roberta; Sportsgodte festivalen; Lazy Towns nye superhelt
LazyTown 7: Hemmelig agent Null	February 6, 2007	3	Fjernbetjeningen; Agent 000; Legedag
LazyTown 8: Den store rekord	February 6, 2007	3	Zapperen; Den store rekord; Robbies raketfart
LazyTown 9: Robbies store plan	March 6, 2007	4	Helt Med Hukommelsestab; Prins Grisky; Robbies Store Plan; Dansekonkurrencen
LazyTown 10: En dag med Sportacus	March 6, 2007	3	LazyTowns Største Hits; En Dag Med Sportacus; Glædelig Jul, Robbie!

=== Finland ===
Ten DVDs have been released in Finland as of March 14, 2007, containing a total of 34 episodes. They are all in Widescreen. All the Scandinavian DVDs feature four audio tracks: Danish, Finnish, Norwegian, and Swedish.

Name	Release date	Number of episodes	Episode titles
LazyTown 1: Tervetuloa LazyTowniin	November 8, 2006	4	Tervetuloa LazyTowniin; Tohtori Rähmästein; Sporttipäivä; Päivän sankari
LazyTown 2: Itkevä dinosaurus	November 8, 2006	4	Levottomat jalat; Rähmäparta; Itkevä dinosaurus; Kristallisieppari
LazyTown 3: Uneton LazyTownissa	December 5, 2006	3	Uneton LazyTownissa; Laiskuripartio; Minun majani
LazyTown 4: Hyvää harjauspäivää	December 5, 2006	3	Kakkuvaras; Hyvää harjauspäivää; Pixelin parhaat
LazyTown 5: Rautaiset futarit	January 24, 2007	4	Vilppiviiksi; Laiskureitten kaupunki; Rautaiset futarit; Rakas päiväkirja
LazyTown 6: Sporttikarkkikarnevaali	January 24, 2007	3	Roberta neiti; Sporttikarkkikarnevaali; Uusi supersankari
LazyTown 7: Salainen agentti nolla	February 14, 2007	3	Kauko ohjain; Salainen Agentti Nolla; Mikä ihmeeni Sportacus?
LazyTown 8: Ennätysten päivä	February 14, 2007	3	Sillä siisti!; Ennätysten päivä; Ystävä avaruudesta
LazyTown 9: Robin rähmäilyt	March 14, 2007	4	Leikkipäivä; Prinssii Stigu; Robin rähmäilyt; Kaksintanssailu
LazyTown 10: Sportacus vauhdissa	March 14, 2007	3	LazyTowninihittikimara; Sportacus vauhdissa; Jonkinmoinenijoulupukki

=== Norway ===
Ten DVDs have been released in Norway as of December 6, 2006, containing a total of 34 episodes. They are all in Widescreen. All the Scandinavian DVDs feature four audio tracks: Danish, Finnish, Norwegian, and Swedish.

Name	Release date	Number of episodes	Episode titles
LazyTown 1: Velkommen til LazyTown	August 9, 2006	4	Velkommen til LazyTown; Doktor Rottenstein; Sportsdag; Ziggy superhelt
LazyTown 2: Råtten Dinosaur	August 9, 2006	4	Fotrapp; Rottenskjegg; Råtten Dinosaur; Krystalltyven
LazyTown 3: Søvnløs i LazyTown	September 6, 2006	3	Søvnløs i LazyTown; Sløve speidere; Min trehytte
LazyTown 4: Karamell-bursdag	December 6, 2006	3	Kaketyven; Karamellbursdag; PixelPix
LazyTown 5: Ballroboten	October 4, 2006	4	Sportafalsk; Verdens lateste by; Ballroboten; Kjære dagbok
LazyTown 6: LazyTowns nye superhelt	October 4, 2006	3	Fru Roberta; Sportsgotteri festival; LazyTowns nye superhelt
LazyTown 7: Hemmelig Agent Null	November 8, 2006	3	Fjernkontroll; Hemmelig Agent Null; Lekedag
LazyTown 8: Rekorddagen	November 8, 2006	3	Fjern det; Rekorddagen; Ziggys romvesen
LazyTown 9: Robbies største tabber	December 6, 2006	4	Hvem Spartacus?; Prins Stingy; Robbies største tabber; Danse-duell
LazyTown 10: LazyTowns spesielle Julenisse	December 6, 2006	3	LazyTowns største hit; Spartacus på farta; LazyTowns spesielle julenisse

=== Sweden ===
Fifteen DVDs have been released in Sweden as of October 1, 2013, containing a total of all 52 episodes. They are all in Widescreen. All the Scandinavian DVDs feature four audio tracks: Danish, Finnish, Norwegian, and Swedish.

Name	Release date	Number of episodes	Episode titles
LazyTown 1: Välkommen till LazyTown	August 9, 2006	4	Välkommen till LazyTown; Doktor Ruttenberg; Sportsdagen; Hjälte för en dag
LazyTown 2: Ropa dinosaurie	August 9, 2006	4	Fotfel; Ruttenhövding; Stygga dinosaurie; Den Stora kristalljakten
LazyTown 3: Sömnlös i LazyTown	September 13, 2006	3	Sömnlös i LazyTown; Slapparscouter; Min trädkoja
LazyTown 4: Borstardagen	December 13, 2006	3	Tårttjuven; Borstardagen; Pixelpix
LazyTown 5: Bollroboten	October 4, 2006	4	Sportafalsk; Den Lataste staden; Bollroboten; Kära dagbok
LazyTown 6: LazyTowns nya superhjälte	October 4, 2006	3	Fru Roberta; Sportgodisfestivalen; LazyTowns nya superhjälte
LazyTown 7: Hemlig Agent Noll	November 8, 2006	3	Fjärrkontroll; Hemlig agent noll; Husdjursdagen
LazyTown 8: Rekorddagen	November 8, 2006	3	Zappa!; Rekorddagen; Ziggys utomjording
LazyTown 9: Robbies största misstag	December 6, 2006	4	Djurdagen; Prins Stingy; Robbies största misstag; Dansduellen
LazyTown 10: LazyTowns oväntade Jultomte	December 6, 2006	3	LazyTowns största hits; Sportacus i farten; LazyTowns oväntade Jultomte
LazyTown 11: Rock & Roll Robbie	August 5, 2013	4	Rock & Roll Robbie; LazyTown kopplar upp; cirkus LazyTown; De lata raketerna
LazyTown 12: Den lata anden	October 1, 2013	4	spökslottet; lilla sportacus; skolskojaren; den lata anden
LazyTown 13: sportacus räddar leksakerna	march 4, 2013	4	sopproblem; pixel TV; sportacus räddar leksakerna; snömonstret
LazyTown 14: Dans drömmar	march 7, 2013	4	dubbel trubbel; dans drömmar; det var en gäng för längesedan; energiboken
LazyTown 15: vänner för evigt	February 10, 2013	2	födelsedagsöverraskningen; vänner för evigt

=== Spain ===
Eight DVDs with episodes of the first season and a box set with the first six DVDs of LazyTown, three episodes per disc, has been released in Spain. The DVDs are fullscreen format.

Name	Release date	Number of episodes	Episode titles
Volumen 1: Bienvenida a Lazytown	2007	3	Bienvenida a Lazytown; Dr. Robbiestein; El día de los deportes
Volumen 2: Héroe por un día	2007	3	Héroe por un día; Pies locos-locos; El pirata barba-retos
Volumen 3: Noche en blanco en Lazytown	2008	3	Que viene el dinosaurio; El cristal perdido; Noche en blanco en LazyTown
Volumen 4: Los vago-scouts	2008	3	Los vagos-scouts; Mi cabaña del árbol; Dulces birlados
Volumen 5: La web de Pixel	2009	3	El día del cepillado; La web de Pixel; Sport-impostor
Volumen 6: Mi querido diario	2009	3	La villa más perezosa; Futbol-bot; Querido diario
Volumen 7: Los mayores fracasos de Robbie	2010	3	La señorita Roberta; El festival de las sport-churches; Los mayores fracasos de Robbie
Volumen 8: Sportacus no para	2010	3	El control remoto; El superagente Cero; Sportacus no para
1ª Temporada	2011	18	Bienvenida a LazyTown; Dr. Robbiestein; El día de los deportes; Héroe por un día; Pies locos-locos; El pirata barba-retos; Que viene el dinosaurio; El cristal perdido; Noche en blanco en LazyTown; Los vagos-scouts; Mi cabaña del árbol; Dulces birlados; El día del cepillado; La web de Pixel; Sport-impostor; La villa más perezosa; Futbol-bot; Querido diario

== Region 4 ==
=== Australia ===
Sixteen DVDs have been released in Australia as of April 2014, containing a total of 64 episodes including the new season 3 episodes. In 2013 Australia was the first country to have episode from series 3 released on DVD. In widescreen format, they feature the original U.S. English soundtrack and descriptive English subtitles for the hearing impaired. It could be possible for Australia to release the first DVDs for season 4.

Name	Release date	Number of episodes	Episode titles
Welcome to LazyTown	May 8, 2008	4	Welcome to LazyTown; Sports Day; Rottenbeard; Defeeted
Zap It!	July 3, 2008	4	Zap It!; Hero for a Day; My Treehouse; The Laziest Town
Super Hero	September 4, 2008	4	LazyTown's New Superhero pt 1 + pt 2; Sportafake; Happy Brush Day
No One's Lazy in LazyTown	April 2009	4	Dr. Rottenstein; Soccer Sucker; Records Day; LazyTown's Greatest Hits
Go! Go! LazyTown	July 2009	4	Remote Control; Dancing Duel; Lazy Scouts; Crystal Caper
LazyTown's Surprise Santa	November 5, 2009	4	Sportacus Who?; LazyTown's Surprise Santa; Miss Roberta; Sports Candy Festival
Sleepless in LazyTown	April 1, 2010	4	Sleepless in LazyTown; Swiped Sweets; Cry Dinosaur; Pixelspix
Play Day	July 1, 2010	4	Secret Agent Zero; Play Day; Prince Stingy; Robbie's Greatest Misses
Rockin' Robbie	November 4, 2010	4	Rockin' Robbie; Lazytown Goes Digital; The LazyTown Circus; Ziggy's Alien
The Lazy Genie	February 3, 2011	4	Little Sportacus; School Scam; The Lazy Genie; Sportacus On The Move!
Sportacus Saves the Toys	June 2, 2011	4	The LazyTown Snow Monster; Sportacus Saves the Toys; Pixel TV; The Lazy Rockets
Dancing Dreams	December 1, 2011	4	Dancing Dreams; Once Upon a Time; Double Trouble; Energy Book
Friends Forever	February 2, 2012	4	Birthday Surprise; Friends Forever; Trash Trouble; Haunted Castle
Roboticus	September 2013	4	Roboticus; Little Pink Riding Hood; The Greatest Gift; The Scavenger Hunt
The Purple Panther	January 2, 2014	5	The Purple Panther pt 1 + pt2; Who's Who?; The Holiday Spirit; The First Day Of Summer
Breakfast at Stephanie's	April 2, 2014	4	Breakfast at Stephanie's; The Blue Knight; The Lazy Cup; Chef Rottenfood

== Region 0 ==
=== Slovenia ===
Nine DVDs were released in Slovenia in 2011, containing a total of 35 episodes. They are presented in widescreen format and feature only the Slovenian dub audio track. Each disc also includes karaoke clips as a bonus.

Name	Release date	Number of episodes	Episode titles
LazyTown 1: Dobrodošli v mestu LazyTown	2011	4	Dobrodošli v mestu LazyTown; Dr. Zgagovec; Športni dan; Junak za en dan
LazyTown 2: Dinosaver straši	2011	4	Športni spektakel; Pirat Zgagobrad; Dinozaver straši; Kristal izgine
LazyTown 3: Nogometna tekma	2011	4	Leni Skavt; Hišica na drevesu; Ziggyjev rojstni dan; Nogometna tekma
LazyTown 4: LazyTown ima novena junaka	2011	4	Spanec je boljši kot žganec; Najbolj leno meto; LazyTown ima novega junaka 1; LazyTown ima novega junaka 2
LazyTown 5: Tajni agent Nič	2011	4	Tajni agent Nič; Sportacus izgubi spomin; Izgini!; Dan rekordov
LazyTown 6: Sejem športnih posladkov	2011	4	Kdo je ukradel torto?; Pixlova spletna stran; Sejem športnih posladkov; Božiček pride v mesto
LazyTown 7: Dragi dnevnik	2011	4	Lažni Sportacus; Dragi dnevnik; Gospodična Roberta; Daljinsko krmiljenje
LazyTown 8: Princ Stingy	2011	4	Ziggyjev vesoljec; Igralni dan; Princ Stingy; Robijevi največji spodrsljaji
LazyTown 9: Plesno tekmovanje	2011	3	Plesno tekmovanje; Največje uspešnice mesta LazyTown; Sportacus se predstavi
