= BooClips =

Line of digital books for children

BooClips is a line of digital books for children on the iPad, Android, PC and Mac. Created by software company Castle Builders (IL), BooClips features storylines and characters from movies, TV shows, and the Bible. The first BooClips book was released in April 2011.

== About BooClips ==
The name "BooClips" is a portmanteau of "books" and "clips." The e-books offer synchronized narration and a bookmark feature, and are intended to engage children in reading by using in-book animations with touch capabilities. There is a video clip following each chapter with a review of the chapter's contents. BooClips books are available in several languages, including American Sign Language. BooClips are designed to be a form of "edutainment," a form of education content which utilizes entertainment to attain its learning goals.

== Partnerships and Releases ==
Castle Builders was licensed to 4Kids Entertainment in 2010. However, after 4Kids Entertainment filed for Chapter 11 bankruptcy in 2011, Castle Builders ended its relationship with the company. In October 2010, LazyTown entertainment announced a partnership with Castle Builders to produce eight digital books for children. Castle Builders pursued various other corporate partnerships with such entities as DreamWorks Animation, The Kids Bible Company LLC, and Sanrio.
