= I Love Christmas =

I Love Christmas may refer to:

- I Love Christmas, album by Tommy James
- "I Love Christmas", song from Bing Bang (Time to Dance)
