= 33rd Daytime Emmy Awards =

- Date: April 28, 2006 (Ceremony); April 22, 2006 (Creative Arts Awards)
- Location: Kodak Theatre, Los Angeles
- Presented by: National Academy of Television Arts and Sciences; Sears; John Frieda
- Hosted by: Tom Bergeron; Cameron Mathison; Kelly Monaco

Highlights
- Outstanding Drama Series: General Hospital
- Outstanding Game Show: Jeopardy!

Television/radio coverage
- Network: ABC
- Produced by: Ricky Kirshner; Glenn Weiss

The 33rd Daytime Emmy Awards, commemorating excellence in American daytime programming from 2005, was held on Friday, April 28, 2006 at the Kodak Theatre in Los Angeles. This was the first time that the Daytime Emmys were held outside New York. ABC televised the ceremonies in the United States. Creative Arts Emmy Awards were presented on April 22, 2006, while nominations were announced on February 8.

This year's Lifetime Achievement Award went to Caroll Spinney, a television entertainer for over four decades, who has portrayed Big Bird and Oscar the Grouch on Sesame Street since 1969, appearing in over 4,000 episodes.

== Nominations and winners ==
The following is a partial list of nominees, with winners in bold:

=== Outstanding Drama Series ===
- As the World Turns
- **General Hospital**
- Guiding Light
- The Young and the Restless

=== Outstanding Lead Actor in a Drama Series ===
- Maurice Benard (Sonny Corinthos, General Hospital)
- **Anthony Geary (Luke Spencer, General Hospital)**
- Thorsten Kaye (Zach Slater, All My Children)
- Robert Newman (Joshua Lewis, Guiding Light)
- Ron Raines (Alan Spaulding, Guiding Light)

=== Outstanding Lead Actress in a Drama Series ===
- Bobbie Eakes (Krystal Carey, All My Children)
- Beth Ehlers (Harley Cooper, Guiding Light)
- Susan Flannery (Stephanie Douglas Forrester, The Bold and the Beautiful)
- Kelly Monaco (Sam McCall, General Hospital)
- **Kim Zimmer (Reva Lewis, Guiding Light)**

=== Outstanding Supporting Actor in a Drama Series ===
- Tyler Christopher (Nikolas Cassadine, General Hospital)
- **Jordan Clarke (Billy Lewis II, Guiding Light)**
- Trent Dawson (Henry Coleman, As the World Turns)
- Grayson McCouch (Dusty Donovan, As the World Turns)
- Greg Rikaart (Kevin Fisher, The Young and the Restless)

=== Outstanding Supporting Actress in a Drama Series ===
- Tracey E. Bregman (Lauren Fenmore, The Young and the Restless)
- Crystal Chappell (Olivia Spencer, Guiding Light)
- Jennifer Ferrin (Jennifer Munson, As the World Turns)
- Renée Elise Goldsberry (Evangeline Williamson, One Life to Live)
- **Gina Tognoni (Dinah Marler, Guiding Light)**

=== Outstanding Younger Actor in a Drama Series ===
- Scott Clifton (Dillon Quartermaine, General Hospital)
- Michael Graziadei (Daniel Romalotti, The Young and the Restless)
- Bryton McClure (Devon Hamilton, The Young and the Restless)
- **Tom Pelphrey (Jonathan Randall, Guiding Light)**
- Jesse Soffer (Will Munson, As the World Turns)

=== Outstanding Younger Actress in a Drama Series ===
- Mandy Bruno (Marina Cooper, Guiding Light)
- Camryn Grimes (Cassie Newman, The Young and the Restless)
- Christel Khalil (Lily Winters, The Young and the Restless)
- **Jennifer Landon (Gwen Norbeck, As the World Turns)**
- Leven Rambin (Lily Montgomery, All My Children)

=== Outstanding Drama Series Writing Team ===
- As the World Turns
- The Bold and the Beautiful
- One Life to Live
- **The Young and the Restless**

=== Outstanding Drama Series Directing Team ===
- The Bold and the Beautiful
- Days of Our Lives
- **General Hospital**
- The Young and the Restless

=== Outstanding Game/Audience Participation Show ===
- **Jeopardy!**
- Who Wants to Be a Millionaire

=== Outstanding Game Show Host ===
- **Alex Trebek, Jeopardy!**
- Meredith Vieira, Who Wants to be a Millionaire

=== Outstanding Talk Show ===
- Dr. Phil
- **The Ellen DeGeneres Show: Ellen DeGeneres, Mary Connelly, Ed Glavin, Andy Lassner (Executive Producers)**
- Live With Regis and Kelly
- The View

=== Outstanding Talk Show Host ===
- **Ellen DeGeneres, The Ellen DeGeneres Show**
- Regis Philbin and Kelly Ripa, Live With Regis and Kelly
- Lisa Rinna and Ty Treadway, Soap Talk
- Barbara Walters, Meredith Vieira, Star Jones Reynolds, Joy Behar and Elisabeth Hasselbeck, The View

=== Outstanding Service Show ===
- **30 Minute Meals**
- Essence of Emeril
- Martha
- Suze Orman: For the Young, Fabulous & Broke
- This Old House

=== Outstanding Service Show Host ===
- Emeril Lagasse, Essence of Emeril
- **Suze Orman, Suze Orman: For the Young, Fabulous & Broke**
- Rachael Ray, 30 Minute Meals
- Martha Stewart, Martha

=== Outstanding Special Class Series ===
- Animal Rescue with Alex Paen
- **A Baby Story**
- Judge Judy
- Starting Over: Jon Murray, Millee Taggart-Ratcliffe, Linda Midgett, Joan O'Connor, Andrea Bailey, Laura Korkoian, Tracy A. Whittaker, Jeanine Cornillot, Adriane Hopper, Julia Silverton
- Trading Spaces: Boys vs. Girls

=== Outstanding Children's Animated Program ===
- Arthur
- Baby Looney Tunes
- Dora the Explorer
- **Jakers! The Adventures of Piggley Winks**
- Peep and the Big Wide World
- Toddworld

=== Outstanding Special Class Animated Program ===
- **Sander Schwartz, Alan Burnett, Duane Capizzi, Michael Goguen, Jeff Matsuda, Linda Steiner, Glen Murakami, Seung Eun Kim, Brandon Vietti, Sam Liu and Ginny McSwain (The Batman)**
- Coconut Fred's Fruit Salad Island!
- The Save-Ums!
- Tutenstein

=== Outstanding Performer In An Animated Program ===
- **Maile Flanagan (Piggley Winks, Jakers! The Adventures of Piggley Winks)**
- Tony Jay, (Spiderus, Miss Spider's Sunny Patch Friends)
- Tara Strong (Dannon, Jakers! The Adventures of Piggley Winks)
- Russi Taylor (Fernando "Ferny" Toro, Jakers! The Adventures of Piggley Winks)
- Jess Harnell (Gumpers, Swanky, Pet Alien)

=== Outstanding Pre-School Children's Series ===
- Blue's Room
- Hi-5
- The Paz Show
- **Sesame Street**

=== Outstanding Children's Series ===
- Between the Lions
- Endurance: Tehachapi
- Postcards from Buster
- Strange Days at Blake Holsey High
- **Zoom**

=== Outstanding Performer in a Children's Series ===
- **Kevin Clash (Elmo, Sesame Street)**
- Julianna Rose Mauriello (Stephanie, LazyTown)
- Sara Paxton (Darcy Fields, Darcy's Wild Life)
- J. D. Roth (Himself, Endurance: Tehachapi)

=== Outstanding Sound Editing - Live Action and Animation ===
- **Thomas Syslo, Timothy Borquez, Keith Dickens, Erik Foreman, Jeff Hutchins, Daniel Benshimon, Doug Andorka, Eric Freeman, Mark Keatts, Michael Garcia, Mark Keefer, Charles Smith and Mark Howlett (The Batman)**
- Joe Pizzulo, Rick Hinson, Mark Keatts, Michael Garcia, Mark Keefer, Charles Smith and Will Anderson (Coconut Fred's Fruit Salad Island!)
- Mark Keatts, Michael Garcia, Mark Keefer, Charles Smith, Otis Van Osten, Melinda Rediger, Jeff Shiffman, Sound Effects Editor (Johnny Test)
- Timothy Borquez, Thomas Syslo, George Nemzer, Doug Andorka, Jeff Hutchins, Mark Howlett, Keith Dickens, Eric Freeman, Mark Keatts, Michael Garcia, Mark Keefer and Charles Smith (Loonatics Unleashed)
- Timothy Borquez, Thomas Syslo, Daisuke Sawa, Doug Andorka, Eric Freeman, Mark Keatts, Michael Garcia, Mark Keefer, Charles Smith and Mark Howlett (Xiaolin Showdown)

=== Outstanding Sound Mixing - Live Action and Animation ===
- Juan Aceves (Dora the Explorer)
- **Blake Norton, Bob Schott, Jim Czak and Dick Maitland (Sesame Street)**
- Don Worsham (Sunday Morning Shootout With Peter Bart & Peter Guber)
- Chris Maddalone, Bill Daly and Dirk Sciarrotta (116th Annual Tournament of Roses Parade)
- Christopher Allan and Dan Lesiw (ZOOM)

=== Lifetime Achievement Award ===
- **Caroll Spinney**

=== Special Tributes ===
- **As the World Turns**
- **Days of Our Lives**
