= Bing Bang (Time to Dance) =

Single by LazyTown and Stephanie

Single by Julianna Rose Mauriello and Chloe Lang

from the album LazyTown – The Album
- B-side: "LazyTown Megamix"; "I Love Christmas"
- Released: 27 November 2006
- Recorded: 1999 (instrumental); 2004 (vocals)
- Length: 3:16
- Label: Gut
- Songwriter: Máni Svavarsson

Music video
- "Bing Bang (Time to Dance)" on YouTube

"Bing Bang (Time to Dance)" is the single version of the LazyTown song "Bing Bang".

The original version is sung at the end of every episode of the Icelandic children's television series by Stephanie and is danced to by Stephanie, Sportacus and the puppets of LazyTown. In the episodes "LazyTown's Surprise Santa", "The Holiday Spirit", "The LazyTown Circus" and "Rockin' Robbie", a Christmas version, circus-style and rock-style of the song are performed. An extended version of the song is performed in the episodes, "Defeeted" and "LazyTown's New Superhero".

The single was released in the United Kingdom on 27 November 2006 as a digital download, and in CD format a week later. On 10 December it reached number 4 on the UK singles chart. Bookmaker William Hill placed the song among five songs that were likely to become the UK Christmas number-one song in 2006. The song became a gold record after selling 100,000 copies in one week.

The song was written by Máni Svavarsson, the composer and one of the scriptwriters for LazyTown. It was originally created for Glanni Glæpur í Latabæ, a 1999–2000 theatrical production in Iceland that later evolved into the popular children's television show. According to Svavarsson, "We wanted Stephanie to sing something catchy—that kids [of] all ages could repeat after hearing it once. The conclusion was 'Bing Bang'. We also wanted the lyrics to represent her character: smiley, dancey, fun-loving."

== Track listing ==
=== Maxi CD ===
1. "Bing Bang" (Time to Dance Single Mix) – 3:16
2. "Bing Bang" (Christmas version) – 2:55
3. "LazyTown Megamix" – 3:43
4. "I Love Christmas" – 1:38
5. "Bing Bang (Time to Dance)": The Video – 3:20

"I Love Christmas" has an extended instrumental introduction on this CD.

== Charts ==
=== Weekly charts ===
Weekly chart performance for "Bing Bang (Time to Dance)"
Chart (2006)	Peak position
Austria (Ö3 Austria Top 40)	42
Germany (GfK)	73
Ireland (IRMA)	15
UK Singles (Official Charts)	4
UK Indie (Official Charts)	1

=== Year-end charts ===
Year-end chart performance for "Bing Bang (Time to Dance)"
Chart (2006)	Position
UK Singles (OCC)	173
