= Sigurveig Jónsdóttir =

Icelandic actress

Sigurveig Jónsdóttir (10 January 1931 – 3 February 2008) was an Icelandic actress. She appeared in more than fifteen films from 1980 to 2001.

== Selected filmography ==
| Year | Title | Role | Notes |
|---|---|---|---|
| 1985 | Cool Jazz and Coconuts | Lovísa Símamær | |
| 1996 | Devil's Island | Karolina | |
| 1996 | Áfram Latibær! | Stína Símalína | |
| 2001 | The Seagull's Laughter | Kidda | |

== Death ==
Sigurveig Jónsdóttir died of natural causes on 3 February 2008.
