= LTS Garðbær Studios =

Studio in Iceland

- Trade name: LazyTown Entertainment
- Company type: Private
- Predecessors: Apolostefanisson Enterprises; Lazy Shows
- Founded: 2002; 24 years ago
- Founders: Magnús Scheving; Guðmundur Þór Kárason; Raymond P. Le Gué; Ragnheiður Melsteð
- Headquarters: Garðabær, Iceland
- Key people: Magnús Scheving (CEO)
- Products: LazyTown
- Owner: Magnús Scheving (2002–2011, 2024-present)
- Parent: Turner Broadcasting System Europe (2011–2019); Warner Bros. International Television (2019–2024)
- Divisions: Wit Puppets; Le Gué Enterprises BV

LTS Garðbær Studios (also known as LazyTown Entertainment) is an Icelandic studio located in Garðabær, Iceland, which succeeded Lazy Shows (founded in 1992). The studio's productions included television series LazyTown. The studio was founded in 2002 by Magnús Scheving and his partners Guðmundur Þór Kárason, Raymond P. Le Gué and Ragnheiður Melsteð. In 2011, Turner Broadcasting System acquired LTS and in 2014 Turner moved the studio to the US.

From 2011 to 2024, the rights to the LazyTown brand were owned by Warner Bros. Discovery through its Warner Bros. International Television Nordics unit. LTS owns Wit Puppets and the creative studio from Le Gué Enterprises BV.

On May 16, 2024, it was announced that Magnús Scheving had agreed to a deal with Warner Bros. Discovery to purchase back the company and the rights to the LazyTown brand.

== Filmography ==
=== Main Shows ===
- Áfram Latibær! - 1st Era (1996-1999)
- Glanni Glæpur Í Latabæ - 2nd Era (1999-2002)
- Glanni Glæpur Í Latabæ - 3rd Era (2002-2003)
- Old Latibær Shorts - 4th Era (Early 2000s-2004)
- LazyTown - 5th Era (2004-2014)
- LazyTown Extra - 6th & Final Era (2008)

=== Shorts ===
- Cartoonito Super All-Star Show (2012)
- Cartoon Network Motivational Campaigns (2013)

== See also ==
- BBC Worldwide
  - CBeebies
  - RÚV
- The Cartoon Network, Inc.
  - Cartoon Network Studios
  - Cartoon Network Latin American Original Productions
  - Cartoonito
  - Copa Studio
  - Hanna-Barbera Studios Europe
  - Zinkia Entertainment
- Warner Bros. International Television Production
