= Shelby Young =

American actress (born 1992)

- Born: April 8, 1992 (age 34); Florida, U.S.
- Occupation: Actress
- Years active: 2001–present

Shelby Young (born April 8, 1992) is an American actress. She is known for her roles on American Horror Story, Days of Our Lives, The Social Network and across Star Wars animation and game titles, as well as her presence on social media.

== Early life ==
Young was born in Florida and always wanted to be an actor. As a child, she loved performing for her friends and family, and performed in pageantry, theater and commercials while living there.

As Young grew, her career focused on voice over and motion capture acting for animation and video.

== Career ==
Young's first television role was in 2001 when she played the role of Sue Ann Butler on the Showtime series Going to California. In 2002, Young played Stephanie in the unaired pilot for LazyTown. From 2005 to 2008, she had a recurring role as Jennifer on Everybody Hates Chris, and from 2009 to 2011, she recurred on Days of Our Lives as Kinsey. Young has also had guest starring roles on the MTV series Awkward (2011), Ghost Whisperer (2006), and Freddie (2006). She then co-starred in the Universal Studios film Wild Child (2008). In 2010, Young played the role of KC in the film The Social Network.

In 2011, Shelby had a recurring role as Leah on American Horror Story: Murder House, the first season in the anthology series. In addition, Young played the role of Rose in The Midnight Game, which was released in 2013 by Anchor Bay Entertainment.

Young starred in the found-footage horror film Nightlight; the film was released in a limited release and through video on demand on March 27, 2015. That same year, she appeared in the film The House Sitter opposite Kate Ashfield. She also starred in the horror-thriller film A Haunting in Cawdor, which was released in the United Kingdom on October 9, 2015, and in the United States in March 2016.

As a voice actress, Young is known in the Star Wars galaxy for voicing multiple characters across their animation titles and video games. Her most notable role may be voicing Princess Leia Organa in projects like Lego Star Wars: The Skywalker Saga, the Disney Channel series Star Wars Forces of Destiny and the Disney Plus TV special, Lego Star Wars: Summer Vacation. Young is also known by video game fans for her work as Soph Blazkowicz, whom she brought to life through both voice and movement via MoCap, in Wolfenstein: Youngblood as one of the first-ever playable female characters in the long-standing franchise. Young's resume includes other AAA franchises such as Call of Duty, Battlefield, Final Fantasy and Dead Rising 3, where she voiced and provided mocap for the lead role of Annie. Young currently recurs as Rayna on Nickelodeon's Baby Shark's Big Show! and as Captain Bragg and others on the Disney Plus series Star Wars: The Bad Batch. Shelby can also be heard in recent hit releases God of War: Ragnarök as Skuld and Horizon Call of the Mountain as Hami.

Young has been doing voice impressions on TikTok, YouTube and other social media platforms and has amassed a following of over 8 million users between the platforms.

== Filmography ==
=== Live-action ===
==== Film ====
| Year | Title | Role | Notes |
|---|---|---|---|
| 2001 | The Wishing Stone | Shelby | |
| 2005 | The Naked Brothers Band: The Movie | Teenage Fan | |
| 2006 | Waltzing Anna | Catherine Rhoades | |
| 2008 | Wild Child | Ruby | |
| 2010 | The Social Network | K.C. | |
| 2013 | First | Brittany | Short film |
| 2013 | The Midnight Game | Rose | |
| 2014 | 2 Bedroom 1 Bath | Sienna | |
| 2014 | #Hacked | Ryder Tate | Short film |
| 2015 | Wrestling Isn't Wrestling | Spooky Girl | Short film |
| 2015 | Nightlight | Robin | |
| 2015 | A Haunting in Cawdor | Vivian Miller | |
| 2015 | Augustine | Keri | Short film |
| 2016 | Katie Goes To College | Heather | Short film |

==== Television ====
| Year | Title | Role | Notes |
|---|---|---|---|
| 2001 | Going to California | Sue Ann Butler | Episode: "Hurricane Al: A Tale of Key Largo" |
| 2002 | LazyTown | Stephanie | Unaired pilot |
| 2005–08 | Everybody Hates Chris | Jennifer Thompson | 4 episodes |
| 2006 | Ghost Whisperer | Young Stacy | Episode: "Friendly Neighborhood Ghost" |
| 2006 | Freddie | Emma | Episode: "Freddie and the Hot Mom" |
| 2008 | Zip | Noreen | Episode: "Pilot" |
| 2009–11 | Days of Our Lives | Kinsey | 59 episodes |
| 2011 | Awkward | Danielle | Episode: "My Super Bitter Sweet Sixteen" |
| 2011 | American Horror Story: Murder House | Leah | 3 episodes |
| 2012 | Criminal Minds | Mackenzie Acklin | Episode: "Through the Looking Glass" |
| 2014 | What's Next for Sarah? | Gloriana | 1 episode |
| 2014 | Checked Out | Mya | Television film |
| 2015 | The House Sitter | Amy Lawrence | Television film |

=== Voice acting ===
==== Film ====
Key
| † | Denotes films that have not yet been released |

| Year | Title | Role | Notes |
|---|---|---|---|
| 2006 | The Santa Clause 3: The Escape Clause | ADR Voice | |
| 2006 | Apocalypto | ADR Voice | |
| 2007 | Underdog | ADR Voice | |
| 2009 | Jonas Brothers: The 3D Concert Experience | ADR Voice | |
| 2010 | My Soul To Take | ADR Voice | |
| 2015 | Jem and the Holograms | ADR Voice | |
| 2015 | The Night Before | ADR Voice | |
| 2016 | Neighbors 2: Sorority Rising | ADR Voice | |
| 2016 | Deidra & Laney Rob a Train | ADR Voice | |
| 2017 | Smurfs: The Lost Village | Additional Voices | |
| 2017 | The Boss Baby | ADR Voice | |
| 2017 | Baywatch | ADR Voice | |
| 2017 | Okja | ADR Voice | |
| 2017 | Captain Underpants: The First Epic Movie | ADR Voice | |
| 2017 | Spider-Man: Homecoming | ADR Voice | |
| 2017 | Flatliners | ADR Voice | |
| 2018 | Status Update | ADR Voice | |
| 2018 | I Can Only Imagine | ADR Voice | |
| 2018 | The Miracle Season | ADR Voice | |
| 2018 | Game Over, Man! | ADR Voice | |
| 2018 | Midnight Sun | ADR Voice | |
| 2018 | Truth or Dare | ADR Voice | |
| 2018 | I Feel Pretty | ADR Voice | |
| 2018 | Life Of The Party | ADR Voice | |
| 2018 | Tag | ADR Voice | |
| 2018 | Ant-Man and the Wasp | ADR Voice | |
| 2018 | Night Hunter | ADR Voice | |
| 2018 | Look Away | ADR Voice | |
| 2018 | Bumblebee | ADR Voice | |
| 2019 | Troop Zero | ADR Voice | |
| 2019 | The Lego Movie 2: The Second Part | Loop Group | |
| 2019 | Happy Death Day 2U | ADR Voice | |
| 2019 | The Dirt | ADR Voice | |
| 2019 | The Perfect Date | ADR Voice | |
| 2019 | UglyDolls | ADR Voice | |
| 2019 | Once Upon a Time in Hollywood | ADR Loop Group | |
| 2019 | Spider-Man: Far From Home | ADR Voice | |
| 2020 | Like a Boss | ADR Voice | |
| 2020 | Butter | ADR Voice | |
| 2020 | The F**k-It List | ADR Voice | |
| 2020 | Chemical Hearts | ADR Voice | |
| 2020 | The Babysitter: Killer Queen | ADR Voice | |
| 2020 | Asphalt Burning | Nina | English dub |
| 2020 | The Craft: Legacy | ADR Voice | |
| 2020 | Freaky | ADR Voice | |
| 2021 | Seance | ADR Voice | |
| 2021 | Vivo | Additional Voices | |
| 2021 | The Boss Baby: Family Business | ADR Voice | |
| 2021 | The J Team | ADR Voice | |
| 2021 | Night of the Animated Dead | Script Reader and Vocal Stand-In | |
| 2021 | Paranormal Activity: Next of Kin | ADR Voice | |
| 2021 | Ghostbusters: Afterlife | Mini Stay-Puft Marshmallow Men | Uncredited |
| 2021 | Spider-Man: No Way Home | ADR Voice | |
| 2022 | The In Between | ADR Voice | |
| 2022 | Marmaduke | Shantrelle | |
| 2022 | Last Seen Alive | Additional Voices | |
| 2022 | Luck | Loop Group | |
| 2022 | Lyle, Lyle Crocodile | Additional Voices | |
| 2022 | Disenchanted | ADR Voice | |
| 2022 | Last Seen Alive | Additional Voices | |
| 2022 | Puss in Boots: The Last Wish | ADR Voice | |
| 2023 | Ant-Man and the Wasp: Quantumania | ADR Voice | |
| 2023 | Cocaine Bear | ADR Loop Group | |
| 2023 | Guardians of the Galaxy Vol. 3 | ADR Voice | |
| 2023 | Ruby Gillman, Teenage Kraken | Additional Voices | |
| 2023 | Ladybug & Cat Noir: The Movie | The Magician | |
| 2023 | The Nun II | Loop Group | |
| 2023 | Leo | Additional Voices | |
| 2023 | Baby Shark's Big Movie! | Rayna Manta | |
| 2023 | The Hunger Games: The Ballad of Songbirds and Snakes | ADR Voice | |
| 2024 | Ghostbusters: Frozen Empire | Mini Stay-Puft Marshmallow Men | Uncredited |
| 2024 | Unfrosted | Additional Voices | |
| 2024 | My Oni Girl | Aoi (Oni), Hinata, Jun, Mei | English dub |
| 2024 | Borderlands | ADR Cast | |
| 2024 | Afraid | ADR Voice | |
| 2024 | Uglies | ADR Voice | |
| 2024 | Almost Popular | Siri's Voice | |
| 2024 | Hitpig! | Catchvan | |
| 2024 | Lonely Planet | Additional Voices | |
| 2024 | Smile 2 | ADR Voice | |
| 2024 | Spellbound | Loop Group | |
| 2024 | Wicked | Loop Group | |
| 2024 | Kraven the Hunter | ADR Voice | |
| 2025 | The Rose of Versailles | Madame Noailles, Madame Jarjayes, Additional Voices | Netflix dub |
| 2025 | Captain America: Brave New World | ADR Voice | |
| 2025 | Final Destination Bloodlines | ADR Voice | |
| 2025 | Ballerina | ADR Voice | |
| 2025 | Elio | Diplo Ship, Additional Voices | |
| 2025 | Superman | ADR Voice | |
| 2025 | I Know What You Did Last Summer | ADR Voice | |
| 2025 | The Fantastic Four: First Steps | ADR Voice | |
| 2025 | The Bad Guys 2 | Bride, Interviewer 2 | |
| 2025 | Gabby's Dollhouse: The Movie | Crosswalk Voice, Additional Voices | |
| 2025 | Tron: Ares | ADR Voice | |
| 2025 | Wake Up Dead Man: A Knives Out Mystery | Additional Voices | |
| 2025 | Five Nights at Freddy's 2 | Loop Group | |
| 2026 | Reminders of Him | ADR Voice | |
| 2026 | The Mandalorian and Grogu | Additional Voices | |
| 2026 | Voicemails for Isabelle | ADR Voice | |
| 2026 | Toy Story 5 | Additional Voices | |
| 2026 | Yellow Jersey | Sports Reporter | Short film † |
| 2026 | Clash of the Thundermans | Slideshow Narrator | |

==== Television ====
| Year | Title | Role | Notes |
|---|---|---|---|
| 2017 | Famous in Love | ADR Voice | 3 episodes |
| 2017–2018 | Star Wars Forces of Destiny | Princess Leia Organa, Princess Kneesaa | 11 episodes |
| 2018 | The Purge | ADR Voice | 1 episode |
| 2018–2021 | Into the Dark | ADR Voice | 6 episodes |
| 2018–2022 | High School Musical: The Musical: The Series | ADR Voice | 24 episodes |
| 2022 | Splitting Up Together | ADR Voice | 2 episodes |
| 2019 | Looking for Alaska | ADR Voice | 2 episodes |
| 2019 | See | ADR Voice | 1 episode |
| 2019–2020 | Trinkets | ADR Voice | 7 episodes |
| 2020 | The Thing About Harry | ADR Voice | TV movie |
| 2020 | Cyanide & Happiness Shorts | Wanda | TV series short, 1 episode |
| 2020 | The Twilight Zone | ADR Voice | 1 episode |
| 2020 | The Walking Dead: World Beyond | ADR Voice | 1 episode |
| 2020 | Cave Club | Emberly, Tyra, Cave Tot | TV miniseries, 8 episodes |
| 2020 | Spirit Riding Free: Ride Along Adventure | Bandit, Female Guard | |
| 2020–2021 | The Stand | ADR Voice | 9 episodes |
| 2021 | WandaVision | ADR Voice | 6 episodes |
| 2021 | The Falcon and the Winter Soldier | ADR Voice | 1 episode |
| 2021 | Launchpad | ADR Voice | 2 episodes |
| 2019–2021 | Riverdale | La Llorona, Additional Voices | 2 episodes |
| 2021 | Arthur's Law | Claudia Lehmann | 5 episodes (English dub) |
| 2021 | Pen15 | ADR Voice | 1 episode |
| 2021 | Star Wars: Visions | K-344, Child (English dub) | Episode: "Tatooine Rhapsody" |
| 2021 | Lego Star Wars: Terrifying Tales | Princess Leia Organa | TV special |
| 2022 | Joe vs. Carole | ADR Voice | 1 episode |
| 2022 | Obi-Wan Kenobi | ADR Voice | 6 episodes |
| 2022 | In the Dark | ADR Voice | 4 episodes |
| 2022 | She-Hulk: Attorney at Law | ADR Voice | 4 episodes |
| 2022 | The Vindicators | Drizz | TV series short, 1 episode |
| 2022 | Broken Karaoke | Candace | TV series short, 1 episode |
| 2022 | Lego Star Wars: Summer Vacation | Princess Leia Organa | TV special |
| 2022 | Wild Card: Shuffled | GPS | 1 episode |
| 2022 | The Guardians of the Galaxy Holiday Special | ADR Voice | TV special |
| 2022–2023 | Willow | Additional Voices | 7 episodes |
| 2023 | Like Crazy by Jimin | Voiceover Sample | Music Video |
| 2020–2023 | The Mandalorian | Additional Voices/ADR Voice | 8 episodes |
| 2021–2023 | Loki | ADR Voice | 11 episodes |
| 2023 | American Born Chinese | Additional Voices | 2 episodes |
| 2023 | Secret Invasion | ADR Voice | 4 episodes |
| 2023 | Special Ops: Lioness | ADR Voice | 1 episode |
| 2023 | Captain Fall | Additional Voices | 6 episodes |
| 2023 | Lego Star Wars Shorts: Vader's Vacation | Princess Leia Organa | YouTube Video |
| 2023 | Ahsoka | C1-D1, Additional Voices | 8 episodes |
| 2023 | Strange Planet | Tween, Narrator #2, Random Being, Balloon Being, Being, Being #3, Waitbeing, Being #1, Cook, Early Being #1 | 5 episode |
| 2023 | Carol & the End of the World | Guest Performer | 6 episodes |
| 2023–2024 | Epic Career Quest | Prism | 8 episodes |
| 2024 | Masters of the Air | ADR Voice | 6 episodes |
| 2024 | X-Men '97 | Additional Voices | 6 episodes |
| 2021–2024 | Star Wars: The Bad Batch | Captain Bragg, Bayrn, Yanna, Lenk, Ailish, Nanny Droid, Axis Droids, PA Voice, Patron, Tactical Droid | 9 episodes |
| 2024 | Star Wars: Tales of the Empire | Nadura, Villager #3 | 2 episodes |
| 2024 | Bloodhound | Frances | 6 episodes (podcast series) |
| 2024 | The Acolyte | Elder Naasa, Additional Voices | Episode: "Destiny" |
| 2024 | Star Wars: Young Jedi Adventures Shorts | Toda-Joh | 1 episode |
| 2021–2024 | What If...? | Additional Voices | 10 episodes |
| 2024 | What We Do in the Shadows | Translation App Voice | 1 episode |
| 2021–2024 | Arcane | Additional Voices | 6 episodes |
| 2024 | Tokyo Override | Watari | 6 episodes; English dub |
| 2024 | Skeleton Crew | Additional Voices | 8 episodes |
| 2024 | Agatha All Along | Additional Voices | 1 episode |
| 2024 | Outer Banks | Additional Voices | 2 episodes |
| 2025 | Untamed | Additional Voices | 5 episodes |
| 2020–2025 | Baby Shark's Big Show! | Rayna, Splashley, Clam, Sea Snail, Daddy Fan, Ocean Sunfish, PA Voice, Robot Female Fish, Kids, Wondercube | 42 episodes |
| 2025 | Win Or Lose | Additional Voices | 1 episode |
| 2025 | Your Forma | Darya Romanovna Chernova, Police Officer | 4 episodes |
| 2025 | City The Animation | Riko Izumi, Mitsuami, Mythical Creature, Waitress, Mrs. Adatara, Yamabushi Employee, Quiz Reader, Store Employee, Tsuchinoko, Mori | 10 episodes |
| 2024–2025 | Lego Star Wars: Rebuild the Galaxy | Princess Leia, Sulky Kid | 6 episodes |
| 2025 | Tatsuki Fujimoto 17-26 | Rie | Episode: "Woke-Up-As-a-Girl-Syndrome" |
| 2023–2025 | Star Wars: Young Jedi Adventures | Toda-Joh, Mada Vangu, Eunice Ino, Kluurt, Roon, Anora, Youngling #1, Villager #1, Gangul Recruit #1, Jenken, Ship Captain, Meditating Youngling, Gangul Guard | 20 episodes |
| 2025 | Haunted: The Van Buren Manor | The Matriarch | 6 episodes (podcast series) |
| 2025 | Tales of the Teenage Mutant Ninja Turtles | Irma, La Fleur, Science Girl, Car Jacker Gal, Ferry Passenger #2 | 5 episodes |
| 2025 | DC High Volume: Batman | Batgirl, Barbara Gordon, Oracle, Skeever's Lawyer | (podcast series) |
| 2024–2026 | Percy Jackson and the Olympians | ADR Voice | 6 episodes |
| 2026 | Shrinking | ADR Voice | 1 episode |
| 2026 | Brilliant Minds | ADR Voice | 1 episode |
| 2026 | St. Denis Medical | ADR Voice | 1 episode |
| 2026 | Mcdonalds Changeables | Fergon | Animated Promo |
| 2026 | Cartoon Cartoons | Cherry | Episode: "Buttons' Gamezone" |
| 2026 | Scrubs | ADR Voice | 1 episode |
| 2025-2026 | Hacks | Additional Voices | 2 episodes |
| 2026 | Rooster | ADR Voice | 1 episode |
| 2026 | The Hunting Party | ADR Voice | 1 episode |
| 2026 | Daredevil: Born Again | ADR Voice | 2 episodes |
| 2026 | Star Wars: Maul - Shadow Lord | Additional Voices | 3 episodes |
| 2026 | Magicampers | Critters | 11 episodes |

==== Video games ====
| Year | Title | Role | Notes | Ref. |
|---|---|---|---|---|
| 2013 | Dead Rising 3 | Annie | Also motion-capture | |
| 2016 | Paladins: Champions of the Realm | Pirate's Treasure Io | | |
| 2016 | Battlefield 1 | Becca Cocchiola | | |
| 2017 | Wolfenstein II: The New Colossus | Minnie Smith, Script Supervisor | Also motion-capture | |
| 2019 | Wolfenstein: Youngblood | Soph Blazkowicz | Also motion-capture | |
| 2020 | Legends of Runeterra | Yordle Squire, Salty Spinner, Vulpine Wanderer | | |
| 2020 | Guardian Tales | Knight Lady Lapice, Dragon Talon Clan Ranpang, Fire Dragon Girgas | | |
| 2020 | Genshin Impact | Jiangzhou, Clerk Zhao, Siyu, Bao'er | | |
| 2020 | Call of Duty: Black Ops Cold War | Additional Voices | | |
| 2020 | Star Wars: Tales from the Galaxy's Edge | Additional Voices | | |
| 2021 | Bright Memory: Infinite | Shelia | | |
| 2022 | Lego Star Wars: The Skywalker Saga | Princess Leia Organa | | |
| 2022 | Star Ocean: The Divine Force | Other | English voice | |
| 2022 | The Elder Scrolls Online | Aurelia Jourvel, Light-Keeper Menoit, Dralcia Keleth | High Isle DLC | |
| 2022 | Bugsnax | Cellystix, Chocolant, Spaghider, Cappucceetle | Isle of Bigsnax DLC | |
| 2022 | God of War Ragnarök | Skuld, Walla Performer | Also motion capture | |
| 2023 | Forspoken | Boy, Boy 1, Boy 5, Noble Boy, Orwin | | |
| 2023 | Horizon Call of the Mountain | Hami | Also motion-capture | |
| 2023 | Star Wars: Jedi Survivor | Anchorite, T1N8, Bedlam Raider | Also motion-capture | |
| 2023 | Harry Potter: Magic Awakened | Esme Page | | |
| 2023 | Spider-Man 2 | Additional Voices | | |
| 2024 | Persona 3 Reload | Yuko Nishiwaki | English voice | |
| 2024 | Slave Zero X | Regent (Female) | | |
| 2024 | Final Fantasy VII Rebirth | Additional Voices | English voice | |
| 2024 | What If...? An Immersive Story | Miss Minutes | | |
| 2024 | Hades II | Arachne | | |
| 2025 | Date Everything! | Connie Soul, Val9000 | | |
| 2025 | DC: Dark Legion | Batgirl | | |
| 2025 | Fortnite | Kor | Chapter Six: Season 3 | |
| 2025 | Game of Thrones: Kingsroad | Nymeria Sand | | |
| 2025 | Star Wars: Beyond Victory - A Mixed Reality Playset | Paghee'Dhe, Staka | | |
| 2024–2025 | Infinity Nikki | Knitwish Oversleeves, Lulukko, Elettra, Lolobo, Barnaby, Alina, Miss Tally, Boldly-Going Nana | English voice | |
| 2026 | Romeo is a Dead Man | Jenny | English voice | |
| 2026 | God of War Sons of Sparta | Amara | | |
| 2026 | High on Life 2 | Lizzie | | |
| 2026 | CookieRun: Kingdom | Mochaccino Cookie | | |
| 2026 | Ledgerbound | Joy | † | |
