= Julie Westwood =

English voice actress and puppeteer

- Born: 21 October 1952 (age 73); Bolton, Lancashire, England
- Occupations: Voice actress; puppeteer
- Years active: 1986–present

Julie Westwood (born 21 October 1952) is an English voice actress and puppeteer, best known for portraying Bessie Busybody in the children's television show LazyTown, as well as a career of other voices.

She lives in Bolton, United Kingdom. Other television shows she has worked on, include the BAFTA award-winning Channel 4/Jim Henson series The Hoobs, in which she plays the voice of Tula, Cartoon Critters as the voice of Fleur and Fully Booked, a BBC Sunday morning television show with Zoë Ball, and later Gail Porter, where she played Morag the Cow. Her sons also joined her on Wolf It. She has also been the voice for Sara, for the manga series Mirmo!

== Characters ==
- Bebe in The Furchester Hotel
- Bessie Busybody, Pixel (Puppetry only), Stingy (UK dub: Season 3-4) in LazyTown
- Tula in The Hoobs
- Fleur in Cartoon Critters
- Madge in It's a Big Big World
- Morag the Cow in Fully Booked
- Sara in Mirmo!
- Y in The Basil Brush Show
- Commander Rhyme-a-Lot in Rhyme Rocket
- Miss Chicken in Dear Mr. Barker
- Box in Allsorts/Gigglish Allsorts
- Kitty Kettle, Soapy Bubbles in The Magic House (TV Series)(Series 2-3)
