= Guðmundur Þór Kárason =

Icelandic puppet designer and puppeteer (born 1974)

- Born: Gùðmundur Þór Kárason; 14 June 1974 (age 51); Reykjavík, Iceland
- Other name: Gudmundur Thor Karason
- Occupations: Puppeteer; puppet designer
- Years active: 1994–present

Guðmundur Þór Kárason (born 14 June 1974) is an Icelandic puppet designer and puppeteer who is best known for his work on LazyTown, in which he portrayed the character Ziggy.

== Early life ==
Guðmundur Þór Kárason was born on 14 June 1974 in Reykjavík, Iceland, to director Kári H. Þórsson and visual artist Jenný E. Guðmundsdóttir.

== Career ==
In 1994, he founded Wit Puppets in Iceland, working on commercials, theater and television programs. Guðmundur's involvement in Wit Puppets ranges from character development, construction and performing some of the puppets himself.

In 1998, Kárason joined Lazy Shows, performing and consulting on the show as well as designing visuals for the company.

Starting in 2004, Kárason was one of the founders of LTS Garðbær Studios (also known as LazyTown Entertainment), puppet performer and voice of Ziggy in LazyTown. In 2010, he was a photographer for the Eurovision Song Contest. In 2011, he was the director and producer for the postcards of the Junior Eurovision Song Contest 2011 in the Armenian capital Yerevan.
