= Stephanie (LazyTown) =

LazyTown character

- LazyTown character
- First appearance: Áfram Latibær! (1996)
- Last appearance: LazyTown Live on Stage (2016)
- Created by: Magnús Scheving
- Portrayed by: Selma Björnsdóttir (1996 play); Linda Ásgeirsdóttir (1999 play); Shelby Young (pilot); Julianna Rose Mauriello (Series 1–2, LazyTown Extra); Chloe Lang (Series 3–4); Kimberly Pena (LazyTown Live!)

In-universe information
- Nicknames: 'Pinky', 'SportaStephanie', 'Pink Girl'
- Species: Human
- Gender: Female
- Occupation: Aspiring dancer and cheerleader
- Family: Unnamed parents (not seen or mentioned) Milford Meanswell (uncle)
- Age: 8 initially, later 10

Stephanie is a fictional character from the children's television series LazyTown, created by Magnús Scheving. She is portrayed as an energetic tomboyish girl who encourages the residents of LazyTown to be more physically active and to adopt healthier habits. In the series, she comes to LazyTown to visit her uncle, Milford Meanswell, the town's mayor, and befriends the local children. She is known for her pink hair, which leads the puppet character Trixie to nickname her "Pinky".

The character originated in the Icelandic stage play Áfram Latibær! (1996), in which she appeared under the name Solla Stirða. For the television adaptation, the character was reworked into Stephanie. In the Icelandic dub of the television series, she was voiced by Ólöf Kristín Þorsteinsdóttir.

Stephanie was portrayed by Julianna Rose Mauriello in the first two seasons of LazyTown and by Chloe Lang in the third and fourth seasons. In earlier stage productions, she was played by Selma Björnsdóttir and Linda Ásgeirsdóttir, and she was also portrayed by Kimberly Pena in LazyTown Live! The Pirate Adventure.

== Description ==
Stephanie is depicted as an athletic, sweet, shy, sassy, tomboyish, caring, optimistic, and smart 8-year-old girl. Surprised by the inactivity of the residents of LazyTown, she encourages them to participate in more active, energetic hobbies or pastimes such as sports, games, and much more, which leaves the residents downhearted when the temptations of candy or video games overcome her prodding. Despite this, Stephanie is characterized by her optimism and self-confidence, which she promotes and shares with her peers in encouragement against all odds or challenges, always triumphing over any obstacles or antagonists by the conclusion of an episode.

Stephanie's attempts are often nearly thwarted by Robbie Rotten, but his plans are never foolproof and always end with Stephanie winning.

== Development ==
Stephanie was originally created by Magnús Scheving for the stage play Áfram Latibær as "Solla Stirða" ("Solla Stiff"), a girl with stiff joints who dreamt of becoming a dancer. Solla also appeared in the sequel to the stage play, Glanni Glæpur í Latabæ. She was played by Selma Björnsdóttir and Linda Ásgeirsdóttir, respectively.

Magnús Scheving reworked Solla into Stephanie for the LazyTown television show. Shelby Young was originally pegged to play Stephanie in 2003, and filmed one unaired pilot before departing due to union issues.

Ultimately, Julianna Rose Mauriello was chosen to play Stephanie, and played her for the first two seasons and LazyTown Extra before departing due to aging out of the role.

Chloe Lang picked up the role of Stephanie for seasons three, four, and LazyTown Motivational Campaigns. And as of 2024, she is the most recent actress to play Stephanie.

== Appearance ==
Stephanie tends to wear a pink sleeveless dress with pale blush pink tights, pink socks, white and pink sneakers and a purple hairband. Her outfit, though, changes from time to time. For example, in "LazyTown Goes Digital" and "Energy Book", she wears pink leggings with her usual dress. She also wears tracksuits and other items of clothing, but they are nearly always pink. Her short bob hair is dyed pink. All her accessories are also pink. She also has long, curled eyelashes and slightly blushing cheeks. She is often seen carrying a pink purse with a heart on it, in which she carries her pink diary. As a pirate, she wore a pink bandanna with a white, fancy letter "S" on it for Stephanie, as well as a striped shirt, loose ripped pink leggings and pink socks. As a princess, she had longer curly hair in pigtails and wore a loose fuchsia princess dress.

== Reception ==
Child development authors Lyn Mikel Brown and Sharon Lamb assert that Stephanie is interesting and makes pink a "power color" due to her quick thinking, computer gaming and sporty nature.
