= Áfram Latibær! =

Icelandic children's stage play

- Music: Máni Svavarsson
- Lyrics: Davið Þor Jónsson
- Book: Magnús Scheving
- Premiere: 1996: Iceland

Áfram Latibær! (English: Go Go LazyTown!) is an Icelandic children's stage play by Magnús Scheving, based on his Icelandic book of the same name. The play premiered in 1996 in Loftkastalinn and was very popular. Baltasar Kormákur was the director, and the cast included Magnús Scheving, Selma Björnsdóttir, Steinn Ármann Magnússon, Ingrid Jónsdóttir, Jón Stefán Kristjánsson, Ólafur Guðmundsson, Magnús Ólafsson, Sigurveig Jónsdóttir, Sigurjón Kjartansson, Ari Matthíasson, Pálína Jónsdóttir, Þórhallur Ágústsson and Guðmundur Andrés Erlingsson. It was later adapted into the children's TV series LazyTown.

== Plot ==
The play is about the residents of LazyTown, who are always lazy and lead unhealthy lifestyles. The Mayor receives a letter from the President telling about a sports competition in LazyTown that the residents have to compete in. After the Mayor is unsuccessful at convincing the residents to compete in the competition, Sportacus arrives, and he teaches the residents how to live a healthy lifestyle and convinces them to compete. LazyTown eventually ends up winning the competition.

== Cast ==
Actor	Character (English name)	Character (Icelandic name)
Magnús Scheving	Sportacus	Íþróttaálfurinn
Selma Björnsdóttir	Stephanie	Solla Stirða
Steinn Ármann Magnússon	Ziggy	Sigurður "Siggi" Sæti
Ingrid Jónsdóttir	Trixie	Halla Hrekkjusvín
Jón Stefán Kristjánsson	Pixel	Goggi Mega
Ólafur Guðmundsson	Stingy	Nenni Níski
Magnús Ólafsson	Mayor Milford Meanswell	Bæjarstjórinn
Sigurveig Jónsdóttir	Bessie Busybody	Stína Símalína
Sigurjón Kjartansson	Jives Junkfood	Magnús "Maggi" Mjói
Ari Matthíasson	Officer Obtuse; Postman	Lolli Lögga; Póstur
Pálína Jónsdóttir	N/A	Eyrún Eyðslukló
Þórhallur Ágústsson	Thief #1	Þjófur 1
Guðmundur Andrés Erlingsson	Thief #2	Þjófur 2

== Songs ==
- "Lífið er fúlt í Latabæ" - Mayor
- "Líttu á þetta Latibær" - Mayor
- "Stína símalína" - Bessie and Mayor
- "Öllu er lokið Latibær" - Mayor
- "Íþróttaálfurinn" - Sportacus
- "Siggi sæti" - Ziggy
- "Goggi mega" - Pixel

- "Maggi mjói" - Jives and his mother
- "Eyrún eyðslukló" - Eyrún
- "Solla stirða" - Stephanie
- "Halla hrekkjusvín" - Trixie
- "Nenni níski" - Stingy
- "Löggulagið" - Officer Obtuse
- "Áfram Latibær!" - Everyone
