= LazyTown =

Icelandic children's television show

- First logo used in 2004–11 from seasons 1–2 on Nick Jr.
- Icelandic: Latibær
- Created by: Magnús Scheving
- Based on: Áfram Latibær! by Magnús Scheving
- Directed by: Magnús Scheving; Raymond P. Le Gué; Kirk Thatcher; Steve Feldman; Jonathan Judge; Sigvaldi J. Karason; Óskar Jónasson
- Starring: Magnús Scheving; Julianna Rose Mauriello; Stefán Karl Stefánsson; Chloe Lang
- Voices of: Ronald Binion; Guðmundur Þór Kárason; Jodi Eichelberger; David Matthew Feldman; Julie Westwood; Kobie Powell; Sarah Burgess; Noel MacNeal; Heather Asch; Joanna Ruiz; Chris Knowings; Aymee Garcia
- Opening theme: "Welcome to LazyTown" by Jón Jósep Snæbjörnsson
- Ending theme: "Bing Bang" (instrumental)
- Composer: Máni Svavarsson
- Country of origin: Iceland
- Original language: English
- No. of series: 4
- No. of episodes: 78 (list of episodes)

Production
- Executive producers: Magnús Scheving; Ragnheiður Melsteð; Raymond P. Le Gué; Mark Read; Brown Johnson; Kay Wilson Stallings
- Producers: Raymond P. Le Gué; Magnús Scheving; Ragnheiður Melsteð
- Cinematography: Tómas Örn Tómasson
- Running time: 24 minutes
- Production companies: LazyTown Entertainment; Truenorth Production; Turner Broadcasting System Europe (seasons 3–4)

Original release
- Network: Nick Jr. (United States); RÚV and Stöð 2 (Iceland); Cartoonito (EMEA)
- Release: 16 August 2004 – 13 October 2014

Related
- LazyTown Extra

LazyTown (Icelandic: Latibær; Icelandic pronunciation: [ˈlatʰiˌpaiːr̥]) is an Icelandic children's television series created by and starring aerobics champion Magnús Scheving, who portrays the character Sportacus. Originally produced in English, it has been broadcast in dozens of languages globally. Designed to encourage healthy lifestyles, the series was based on Scheving's stage play Áfram Latibær!, itself adapted from a book that Scheving wrote in 1995.

The series was commissioned by Nickelodeon in early 2003, following the production of two stage plays and a test pilot. Originally performed in American English, it was later dubbed into thirty different languages and broadcast in over 180 countries around the world. It combines live action, puppetry and computer animation, making it one of the most expensive children's shows, with the cost per episode being over five times that of the average children's show.

The first two seasons, consisting of fifty-two episodes, were produced from 2004 to 2007. LazyTown originally aired on Nickelodeon's Nick Jr. block in the United States and the United Kingdom and RÚV in Iceland. In 2011, Turner Broadcasting System Europe acquired LazyTown Entertainment and commissioned the third and fourth seasons. Consisting of twenty-six episodes, they premiered in 2013 on Turner's Cartoonito and later on Viacom's Channel 5, for a total of seventy-eight episodes and four seasons. LazyTown was also aired in the United States on the NBCU-owned PBS Kids Sprout channel after it acquired the rights to the show.

Various spin-offs were created, including stage productions and LazyTown Extra, a short-form series for younger children.

== Plot ==
The series focuses on a town called LazyTown, where the residents spend most of their time being inactive and unmotivated. With help from hero Sportacus and newcomer Stephanie, they learn how to become more active and lead healthier lifestyles. They are opposed by the villainous Robbie Rotten, who prefers to lead a sluggish life and devises schemes to make LazyTown lazy. However, his plans, which, ironically, involve him becoming physically active, are never foolproof and always fail.

Each of the children that Stephanie befriends embodies negative traits. Ziggy has an unbalanced diet with a lack of fruits and vegetables, Pixel is very reclusive and spends too much time on his computer, Stingy is self-centered, selfish and possessive, and Trixie is a troublemaker with little respect for rules and other people. As the series progresses, the characters become less lazy in favor of a healthier lifestyle.

The program features a predominantly Eurodance soundtrack. Each episode features at least one original song and concludes with a performance of "Bing Bang", sung by Stephanie. Many tracks are reworked versions of songs from the original Icelandic plays.

== Characters ==
=== Live action ===
- Sportacus, Icelandic: Íþróttaálfurinn, lit. 'the athletic elf', (portrayed by Magnús Scheving), is the hero of LazyTown and the male protagonist of the series, who has a rivalry with Robbie Rotten and is dedicated to exercise and healthy eating. He lives in a futuristic airship above LazyTown and is alerted to people who need help when the crystal on the chest of his costume glows. He is empowered by fruits and vegetables, which he calls "sports candy", but loses his powers after eating junk food, which can only be restored by eating healthy food. In the third season, he gains new equipment, including a backpack that is integrated into his outfit and contains food and sports equipment. His crystal also flashes red when his energy is low.
- Stephanie, Icelandic: Solla Stirða, lit. 'Solla inflexible', (portrayed by Shelby Young in the unaired pilot, Julianna Rose Mauriello in series 1–2 and Chloe Lang in series 3–4), is an athletic, energetic, tomboyish, kind, optimistic, but shy and sassy, pink-clad 8-year-old girl and aspiring dancer and the female protagonist of the series. Upon moving to LazyTown to live with Mayor Meanswell, she is surprised by Ziggy, Pixel, Stingy and Trixie's laziness and tries to convince them to try healthier activities while dealing with Robbie Rotten's schemes.
- Robbie Rotten, Icelandic: Glanni Glæpur, lit. 'reckless crime' (portrayed by Stefán Karl Stefánsson), is the villain of LazyTown and the main antagonist of the series, who devises schemes to keep the citizens of LazyTown lazy and discourage their active lifestyles. He despises Sportacus, and several of his schemes involve trying to get rid of him fails for multiple times. Ironically, he puts so much effort into his schemes that he is one of LazyTown's most active citizens.

=== Puppets ===
- Ziggy, Icelandic: Siggi Sæti, lit. 'Siggi sweet', (puppeteered and voiced by Guðmundur Þór Kárason in the US, voiced by Lorraine Parsloe in the UK), is a 6-year-old boy who loves candy and sweets. He is naive and admires Sportacus.
- Pixel, Icelandic: Goggi Mega, (puppeteered by Ronald Binion/Julie Westwood and voiced by Noel MacNeal/Kobie Powell/Chris Knowings/Ronald Binion in the US and Joanna Ruiz in the UK), is an intelligent 9-year-old boy, who is passionate about technology and inventing. He is reclusive and antisocial, repairing gadgets to avoid exercising and often spending time on his computer or playing video games. He has a crush on Stephanie and often struggles to talk to her. His house often serves as a meeting spot for the children, as it is spacious and has a television. He represents reclusiveness and technology addiction.
- Stingy, Icelandic: Nenni Níski, lit. 'Nenni cheapskate', (puppeteered by Jodi Eichelberger in the US and Sarah Burgess/Julie Westwood in the UK), is a 7-year-old boy who is selfish and possessive, but cares for his friends. He has a piggy bank who he calls Piggy and considers his best friend, and his father is supposedly the richest man in town. He represents possessiveness and a self-centered attitude.
- Trixie, Icelandic: Halla Hrekkjusvín, lit. 'Halla trickster', (puppeteered by Amanda Maddock/Sarah Burgess/Heather Asch/Aymee Garcia and voiced by Sarah Burgess/Heather Asch/Aymee Garcia in the US and Joanna Ruiz in the UK), is an 8-year-old girl who is fun-loving and often causes trouble. She also has a crush on Stingy and even gives him a kiss in the episode "Crystal Caper." She represents impatience and a lack of respect for rules.
- Mayor Milford Meanswell, Icelandic: Bæjarstjórinn, lit. 'the mayor', (puppeteered by David Matthew Feldman), is Stephanie's uncle and the mayor of LazyTown, who has a crush on Bessie. He is old-fashioned and often confused by modern technology.
- Miss Bessie Busybody, Icelandic: Stína Símalína, lit. 'Stína phoneline', (puppeteered by Julie Westwood), is the town PR agent and Mayor Meanswell's secretary. Though pompous and sassy, she is fashionable, aware of trends, and tries to be motherly with the children. She is often so engrossed with talking on her mobile phone that she is oblivious to what is going on around her.

=== Other ===
- Jives Junkfood, Icelandic: Maggi Mjói, is a tall and thin teenage boy who lives alone in his house. Though he only appears in the Icelandic plays, his home appears in the series and he is seen on cards and books.
- The rooster, Icelandic: Haninn, is a symbol of LazyTown, appearing on the town emblem and on the papers in Meanswell's filing cabinets. In the second play, the rooster was an anthropomorphic character who acted as a narrator.
- Bean appears in Sprout's LazyTown spin-off block "The Super Sproutlet Show", who shows viewers how to plant fruits and vegetables and make healthy meals. She rides on a bike with a greenhouse on the back.

== Episodes ==
Season	Episodes	Originally released	
Season	Episodes	First released	Last released
Pilot		2002 (Unaired)	
1	34	August 16, 2004	May 18, 2006
2	18	September 25, 2006	October 15, 2007
3	13	March 13, 2013	December 12, 2013
4	13	January 10, 2014	October 13, 2014

Fifty-two episodes were produced for the first two seasons of LazyTown between 2004 until 2007, with a further 26 produced between 2013 until 2014.

== History and production ==
LazyTown began as a storybook published in 1995 titled Áfram Latibær! ("Go Go LazyTown!"). A second book, Latibær á Ólympíuleikunum (LazyTown at the Olympics), was published in 1996. Later in 1996, a stage adaptation of the first book was shown in Iceland. (Note: Premiered in April 1996 with the Theater Company of Vestmannaeyjar. Another stage production by Baltasar Kormákur premiered in November 1996 in Reykjavík.) It featured Sportacus as an energetic elf and Stephanie as an out-of-shape dancer. The puppet characters seen in the television series also appeared in human form, but Robbie Rotten did not yet exist. A third book, Latibær í Vandræðum (LazyTown in Trouble), was published in 1997. This book introduced Robbie Rotten to the franchise. A second stage show based on the third book titled Glanni Glæpur í Latabæ (Robbie Rotten in LazyTown) debuted in 1999. It introduced Stefán Karl Stefánsson as Robbie Rotten and featured more finalized versions of the other characters. Nickelodeon Australia reported that by the time the second play finished touring, LazyTown had become a household name in Iceland. A variety of tie-in products and media were created in the country before Scheving decided to develop LazyTown into a television program; these included bottled water, toy figures, and a radio station. Development on the TV series began in 2000, following the success of the second play. Production on the TV series began in 2002, and in 2003, the pilot was pitched to Nickelodeon. A deal was subsequently made with the network on September 3, 2003. The deal allowed for Nickelodeon to obtain US consumer product and broadcast rights to the series, while LazyTown Entertainment would handle the rest of the world.

In most episodes, the only characters played by live actors are Sportacus, Stephanie, and Robbie Rotten. The rest of the characters are depicted as puppets, made by the Neal Scanlan Studio and Wit Puppets. The show was filmed and produced at 380 Studios, a purpose-built studio near Reykjavík equipped with high-end HDTV production facilities and one of the largest green screens in the world. The production floor area is 1,800 square meters. The budget for each episode was approximately ISK 70,000,000 (US$1 million), about five times the average cost for a children's television program at the time, making it "the most expensive children's show in the world" according to Scheving.

Its virtual sets were generated with an Unreal Engine 3-based framework, created by Raymond P. Le Gué and known as XRGen4. According to Le Gué, "We start with the live actors and puppets on a physical set with a green screen behind them as a backdrop. The green screen is replaced in real time with the sets created in XRGen4 using UE3. As we move the camera and actors around the physical set, the backdrop scene also moves in real time in complete synchronization with the movements of the real camera. All of this is recorded, and the director can watch the resulting composition in real time." Seasons 3 and 4 of LazyTown were filmed as usual in the LazyTown Studios in Iceland, but the special effects for these seasons were created by Turner Studios in Atlanta, USA.

=== Future ===
On 16 May 2024, in an interview given to Stöð 2, Magnús Scheving received the rights for LazyTown back from Warner Bros. Discovery. Also expressing interest in reviving the show in some way, Scheving remarks, "LazyTown must be moving. We sometimes say "Let's move the world". Let's move the world. That's what LazyTown should do. I think that LazyTown has a lot to do again, as can be seen from YouTube views and such. It's a hugely popular topic, incredibly."

== Television and on-demand history ==
Final logo used in 2013-14 from seasons 3-4 on Cartoonito

In the United States, the show premiered on Nickelodeon on the Nick Jr. block on August 16, 2004, and ended on October 15, 2007. The second season debuted in the United States on Nickelodeon in 2006. It also aired in the United States on CBS, as part of the Nick Jr. on CBS Saturday morning block, from September 18, 2004, to September 9, 2006. The series aired on Noggin and its successor, the Nick Jr. Channel, from November 22, 2004, to July 19, 2010. On April 18, 2011, PBS Kids Sprout acquired the American TV rights to LazyTown. The series aired daily on PBS Kids Sprout from September 5, 2011, to September 26, 2016. LazyTown aired on NBC Kids from July 7, 2012, to March 26, 2016.

The series has been broadcast on a variety of networks internationally, many of which belong to Viacom Media Networks. Nickelodeon Southeast Asia has carried the program in eleven territories. In Oceania, it is shown on Nickelodeon Australia. In the United Kingdom and Ireland, it aired on the BBC's CBeebies, Nick Jr. UK, Noggin and Boomerang. The series arrived in the UK on October 3, 2005, making a simultaneous debut on both CBeebies and Nick Jr, to combat the obesity crisis in UK which was at its peak. CBeebies aired the first two series and stopped repeats in March 2012. Nick Jr UK stopped airing repeats in 2011. After the series was revived for seasons three and four, Turner's Cartoonito premiered episodes from 2013 to 2014. Viacom's Channel 5 also aired the newer episodes as part of its Milkshake! programming block until 2016. Channel 5's Demand 5 service carried episodes of the Icelandic version in 2015.

In 2008, a Spanish-dubbed version of LazyTown debuted on V-me, a television network created for the Hispanic market in the US. The Spanish-dubbed version was also aired on Telemundo (a sister station to NBC) as part of the weekend preschool morning block MiTelemundo.

In 2011, an Arabic dub aired on Cartoon Network Arabia's early morning Cartoonito block for the Middle East and North Africa and it aired until late 2014 when the block was discontinued. It made a brief return to air in 2019 upon the return of the Cartoonito block on the channel, but hasn't been aired since. In 2010, a subtitled version briefly aired on Saudi Channel (MBC 3 and Ajyal TV) but was not a huge success compared to the dubbed version at Cartoon Network Arabia.

In Brazil, the two first seasons of the show was broadcast with Brazilian Portuguese dubbing on SBT (on the children's television block Bom Dia & Cia), and subsequently on Discovery Kids and Cartoon Network. The last two seasons were broadcast on Boomerang until 2018.

In Serbia, Bosnia-Herzegovina and Macedonia, the show was broadcast on Ultra TV. A Croatian-dubbed version called Lijeni Grad was broadcast in Croatia on HRT 2. A Macedonian-dubbed version called Мрзеливиот Град was broadcast in Macedonia on Sitel.

In Portugal, the first two seasons of the European Portuguese version aired on RTP2, and Canal Panda, with the latter two seasons airing solely on RTP2 several years later.

The series has been dubbed into thirty-two languages. In the Icelandic dub, actors Magnús Scheving (Sportacus), Guðmundur Þór Kárason (Ziggy) and Stefán Karl Stefánsson (Robbie Rotten) dubbed themselves on the audio track.

== Reception ==
=== Ratings ===
The week of LazyTown's debut on Nickelodeon in the United States was the channel's highest-rated premiere week in three years. A broadcast of the hour-long primetime episode "LazyTown's New Superhero" in August 2005 drew three million total viewers, ranking number-one in its time period among all broadcast and cable television with the 2–5, 2–11, and 6–11 demographics. The episode garnered double-digit increases over the last Nick Jr. primetime special to air before it, which was an episode of the network's then-highest-rated series Dora the Explorer.

=== Critical reception ===
The Hollywood Reporter's Marilyn Moss praised the show's intentions to encourage exercise, calling it "great fun for the very young set, not to mention educational, maybe even life-changing." Justin New of The Washington Times called LazyTown "a great show" and stated that he admired the Sportacus character. Common Sense Media's Joly Herman gave the show a more mixed review, stating that the characters' healthy choices are "sometimes lost in the show's chaotic nature". Pete Vonder Haar of the Houston Press called LazyTown "pretty much the creepiest show on TV since Twin Peaks", citing the "off-putting" mix of live-action and puppetry.

The program has been noted for its appeal towards multiple age groups. In 2005, The Boston Globe stated that the program "has sparked a cult of healthy living among a certain preschool set [and] has a grown-up following, too". Lynne Heffley of the Los Angeles Times stated that LazyTown "has zany appeal, even to viewers who are no longer 'junior'."

=== Accolades ===
Year	Presenter	Award/Category	Nominee	Status	Ref.
2004	Nordic Council	Nordic Public Health Prize	Magnús Scheving	Won	
2005	Edduverðlaunin	Best Art Direction – Puppet Design	Magnús Scheving; Guðmundur Þór Kárason; Neal Scanlan	Won	
2005	Edduverðlaunin	Best Art Direction – Costume Design	Maria Ólafsdóttir; Guðrún Lárusdóttir	Nominated	
2005	Edduverðlaunin	Best Cinematography and Editing – Timer	Tómas Örn Tómasson	Nominated	
2005	Edduverðlaunin	Best Fiction Television	Magnús Scheving; Jonathan Judge; Mark Valenti	Nominated	
2005	Edduverðlaunin	Best Screenwriting	Magnús Scheving; Jonathan Judge; Mark Valenti	Nominated	
2006	33rd Daytime Emmy Awards	Outstanding Performer in a Children's Series	Julianna Rose Mauriello	Nominated	
2006	British Academy Children's Awards	International	Magnús Scheving; Raymond P. Le Gué; Jonathan Judge	Won	
2007	34th Daytime Emmy Awards	Outstanding Achievement in Music Direction and Composition	Máni Svavarsson	Nominated	
2007	British Academy Children's Awards	International	Magnús Scheving; Raymond P. Le Gué; Jonathan Judge	Nominated	
2008	Edduverðlaunin	Best Fiction Television	Magnús Scheving	Nominated	
2008	Edduverðlaunin	Best Art Direction – Makeup	Ásta Hafþórsdóttir	Nominated	
2008	Edduverðlaunin	Best Art Direction – Costume Design	Mary Ólafsdóttir	Nominated	
2008	Edduverðlaunin	Best Sound Editing	Nicolas Liebing; Björn Victorsson	Nominated	
2008	Edduverðlaunin	Best Set Design	Snorri Freyr Hilmarsson	Nominated	

== LazyTown Extra ==
On 15 September 2008, a spin-off television series called LazyTown Extra debuted in the United Kingdom on CBeebies. A "magazine format style show" for 3 to 6-year-olds, it features characters from LazyTown in an assortment of short sketches. Twenty-six episodes of LazyTown Extra were produced, each between 11 and 15 minutes in duration.

== Merchandise ==
In February 2005, Nickelodeon unveiled a collection of LazyTown products at the American International Toy Fair. Fisher-Price partnered with Viacom's consumer product division to produce the merchandise, all of which was designed to encourage physical activity.

== Promotional events ==
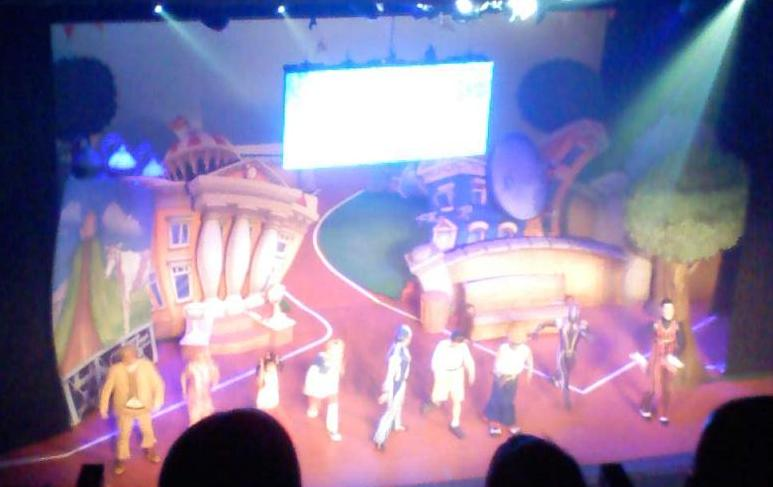
The 2007–2008 LazyTown Live show at The Alexandra Theatre, Birmingham

From June to August 2005, LazyTown's Stephanie hosted the "Nick Jr. Power Play Summer" event, which involved a series of television spots that replaced the channel's standard on-air continuity. Similarly to the live performances and the program itself, this campaign was an experiment designed by the network to increase awareness of exercise and nutrition in its preschool audience.

Nickelodeon produced a stage show titled LazyTown Live! in 2005. It debuted at Nickelodeon Suites Resort on 6 August. A modified version toured the United Kingdom and Ireland between October 2007 and August 2008. It introduced a new cast to the United Kingdom, including Julian Essex-Spurrier as Sportacus.

A Spanish-speaking version of the live show premiered in Mexico in 2008, followed by Argentina, Costa Rica, Guatemala and Panama. As of 2009, it was scheduled to tour the United States in 2010. A Brazilian version of the live show premiered in São Paulo in October 2008. New productions of LazyTown Live had their premieres in November 2009 in Portugal and in March 2010 in Spain by producers Warner Bros. Entertainment. A stage play premiering in 2011 introduced the character and concept for Roboticus, which became the first episode of Season 3 of the show in an abridged form.

From 28 January, to 29 November 2009, a live stage production entitled LazyTown Live! The Pirate Adventure toured the United Kingdom and Ireland. It featured characters and songs from LazyTown, performed by a new cast. In 2016, a UK production entitled LazyTown Live On Stage ran from 7 July 2016, to 4 September 2016. This production was posted on YouTube and featured the song "We Are Number One".

A live show LazyTown in Schools premiered in Australia in 2012, touring schools to promote healthy eating and fitness for children.

== See also ==
- List of Internet phenomena
- Television in Iceland
