= Robbie Rotten =

Main antagonist of LazyTown

- LazyTown character
- First appearance: Glanni Glæpur í Latabæ (1999)
- Last appearance: Mystery of the Pyramid (2014)
- Created by: Magnús Scheving
- Portrayed by: Stefán Karl Stefánsson

Robbie Rotten (Icelandic: Glanni Glæpur, lit. 'Reckless crime') is a fictional character and the main antagonist of the Icelandic children's program LazyTown. He is also the series' primary comic relief character. He is a ruthless, greedy and lazy, yet goofy, eccentric and silly supervillain, and the arch-nemesis of Sportacus, who promotes exercise, healthy eating and an active and healthy lifestyle. As for Robbie, his favorite pastimes include eating junk food and watching TV.

Robbie Rotten's song "You Are a Pirate" was Stefán's favorite song on the show to perform. Since 2007, the lyric "Do what you want 'cause a pirate is free, you are a pirate" became an oft-quoted meme in YouTube poop and hacker culture, most often in reference to online piracy via LimeWire. Around 2016, Robbie Rotten rose to internet fame through the song "We Are Number One". The Reddit forum r/dankmemes voted Robbie Rotten "Meme of the Year" in 2016.

On August 21, 2018, actor Stefán Karl Stefánsson died of bile duct cancer at the age of 43. Fans of LazyTown and co-stars paid tribute to him.
