= Sportacus =

LazyTown character

- LazyTown character
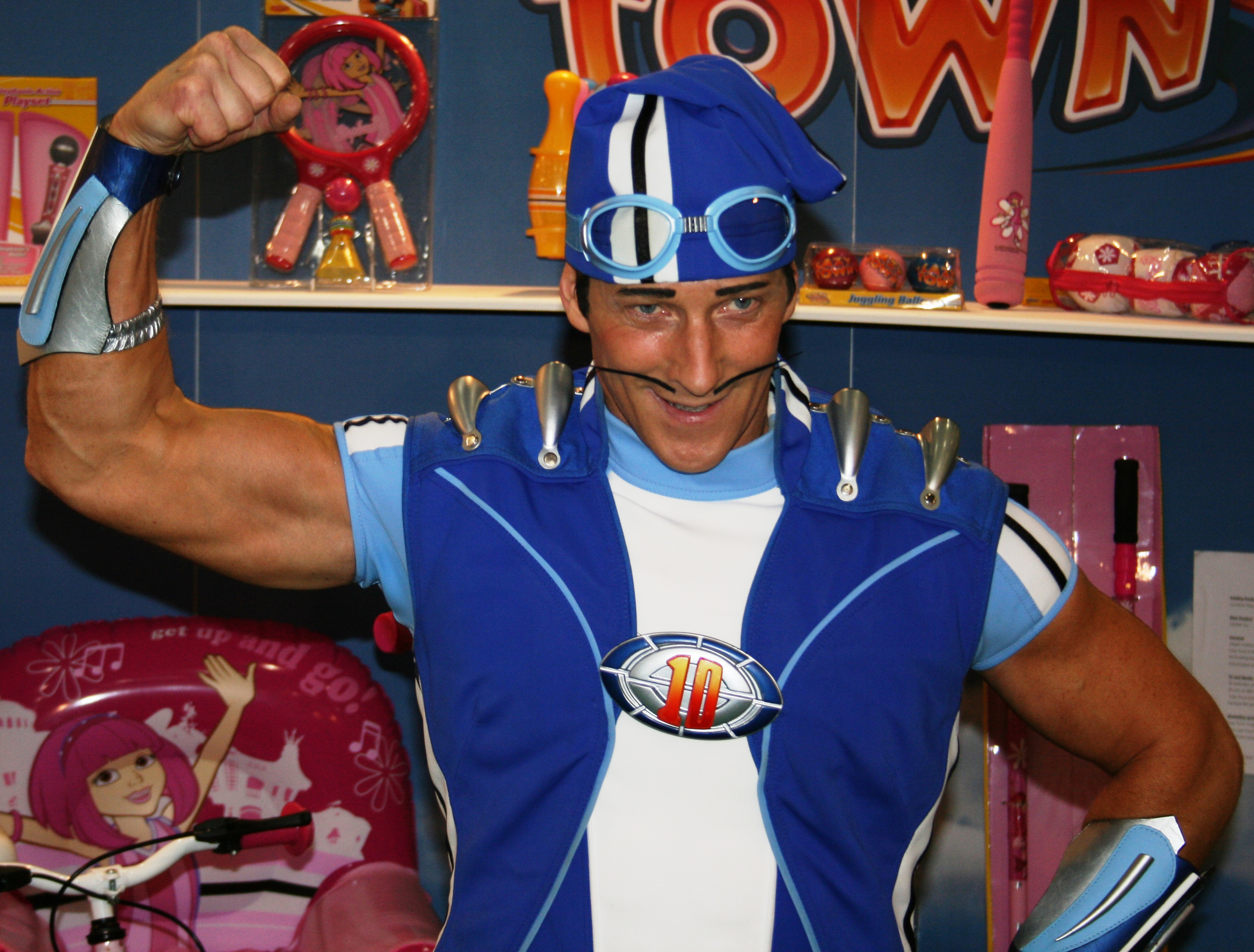
- Magnús Scheving as Sportacus at the UK Toy Fair 2009
- First appearance: Áfram Latibær! (1996)
- Last appearance: Ævintýri í Latabæ (2014)
- Created by: Magnús Scheving
- Portrayed by: Magnús Scheving (1996–2014); Dýri Kristjánsson (2014–present); David Kristján Ólafsson (young); Þordis Elva Þorvaldsdottir (voice, young); Matthías Matthíasson (singing voice)

In-universe information
- Species: Human (in the series); Elf (in the plays and the Icelandic dub of the series)
- Gender: Male
- Occupation: Superhero
- Nationality: Icelandic

Sportacus 10 (Icelandic: Íþróttaálfurinn, lit. 'the Athletic Elf') is a fictional character from the Icelandic children's television show LazyTown, created and portrayed by Magnús Scheving. His name in English is a portmanteau of the ancient figure Spartacus and the word sport, which represents his athleticism. Sportacus humbly describes himself as a "slightly above-average hero", though his friends have a higher opinion of him, calling him a "superhero".

Sportacus encourages the children of LazyTown to eat fruits and vegetables (which he calls "sports candy") and play outside instead of sitting around indoors and eating unhealthy food. He wants to make sure LazyTown is happy, and knows that its residents have to be healthy and fit if they want to be happy. He is opposed by the sinister (yet equally energetic) Robbie Rotten, who seeks to return LazyTown to its former state: a lazy town. Sportacus is so engaged in his life of physical activity that he does parkour just to get from place to place—even doing acrobatic flips just to get from one side of his kitchen table to the other—and the children have to instruct him on how to relax.

Sportacus lives in a large airship above LazyTown, which contains his bed, food, and other equipment, including a signed autograph from Jackie Chan. This is an Easter egg to the actor's portrayal of the villain in The Spy Next Door.

== History of the character ==
Sportacus 10 was a boy in LazyTown, named Alex. His adversary was another boy named Robbie, who teased him. Sportacus 9 came along and convinced the kids to exercise and gave Alex the Sportacus 10 costume. Robbie later became Robbie Rotten and remained the adversary of Sportacus 10.

In the original Icelandic play on which the television series was based, Áfram Latibær! (Go LazyTown!) in 1996, Sportacus was an elf called Íþróttaálfurinn (The Athletic Elf) who possessed magical powers and wore a navy-blue tunic, baggy green trousers, and a large burnt umber hat. He also had a large, thick, blond moustache and goatee beard. Sportacus is called Íþróttaálfurinn in all of his Icelandic language appearances, including the Icelandic dub of the TV series.

In the second play, Glanni Glæpur í Latabæ (Robbie Rotten in LazyTown), Sportacus became more similar to his current version. He traveled around in a hot air balloon and wore a brown-and-yellow version of his current outfit, albeit with a larger, looser hat and sculpted chest piece.

In the TV show, Sportacus wore a blue and white tracksuit, a blue vest, a blue stocking cap with a thick white stripe and thin black stripe on it, light blue goggles, deep blue boots with red, black and white stripes running down them, blue metal bracers on his arms, and a black pointed mustache. His hat, also known as a "skotthúfa" in Icelandic, is an aspect of Iceland's national dress. He also travelled around in an airship.

== Reception ==
Sportacus has taken part in several health campaigns. In 2010, Sportacus and then-first lady of the USA Michelle Obama visited the Bruce Monroe school in Washington as part of the Let's Move! campaign. In 2012 Sportacus visited Wareham Wareham Children’s Centre as part of the Change4Life campaign in the UK. In 2013 Sportacus was the only character from LazyTown that attended a sport campaign in Egilsstaðir and Borgarnes in Iceland as part of the European Move week campaign.

In 2006 Magnús Scheving, the Sportacus actor and creator, hired Dýri Kristjánsson as the stuntman for the Sportacus role. In 2014 Dýri took completely over the role of Sportacus, as Magnús was becoming too old for the role.

Colombian gymnast Ángel Barajas, who won a silver medal at the 2024 Summer Olympics, cited Sportacus as his inspiration for starting gymnastics.
