= List of Icelandic brands =

This is a list of Icelandic brands, which encompasses brand-name products and services produced by companies in Iceland.

== Icelandic brands ==
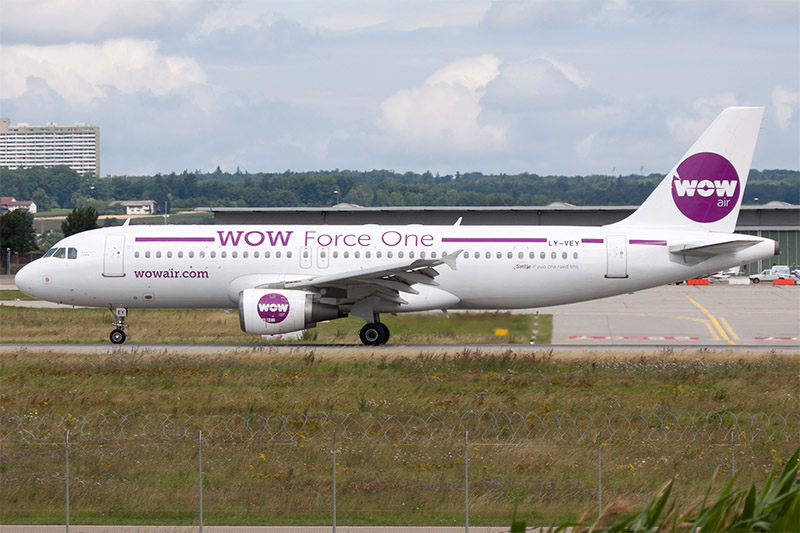
A WOW air Airbus A320

- Sýn
- 66°NORTH
- Icelandair
- AURUM By Guðbjörg - Iceland's leading jewellery brand, est. 1999
- CCP Games
- Egill Skallagrímsson Brewery
- FRISK Software International
- Icelandair Group – the largest corporation in Iceland, with 125 billion ISK in revenue in 2013
- Icewear
- Íslandsbanki
- ISNIC
- Marel
- Metro
- Nói Síríus
- Össur
- Reyka
- Síminn
- Sláturfélag Suðurlands
- Tulipop
- WOW air – Second largest airline in Iceland, declared bankrupt in 2019
- Eimskip
- Kjarnafæði - Meat production company based in northern part of Iceland
- Norðlenska - Meat production company based in northern part of Iceland
- BYKO
- Húsasmiðjan

== See also ==
- Economy of Iceland
- List of companies of Iceland
- List of restaurants in Iceland
