= List of companies of Iceland =

Location of Iceland

Iceland is a Nordic island country in the North Atlantic Ocean. It has a population of 356,991 and an area of 103,000 km^{2} (40,000 sq mi), making it the most sparsely populated country in all of Europe. The capital and largest city is Reykjavík. Reykjavík and the surrounding areas in the southwest of the country are home to over two-thirds of the population. Iceland is volcanically and geologically active.

Iceland has a market economy with relatively low taxes compared to other OECD countries. It maintains a Nordic social welfare system that provides universal health care and tertiary education for its citizens. Iceland ranks high in economic, political and social stability and equality. In 2013, it was ranked as the 13th most-developed country in the world by the United Nations' Human Development Index. Iceland runs almost completely on renewable energy. Affected by the 2008 financial crisis, the nation's entire banking system failed in October 2008, leading to the 2008–2011 Icelandic financial crisis and a severe depression, the 2009 Icelandic financial crisis protests, the Icesave dispute, and the institution of capital controls. Many bankers were jailed, and the economy has made a significant recovery, in large part due to a surge in tourism.

As of 2011, there were approximately 32,500 companies registered in Iceland of which 14,500 (45%) were active.

== Notable firms ==
This list includes notable companies with primary headquarters located in the country. The industry and sector follow the Industry Classification Benchmark taxonomy. Organizations which have ceased operations are included and noted as defunct.

Active firms
State-owned firms
Defunct firms

| Name | Registered name | Industry | Sector | Headquarters | Founded | Notes |
|---|---|---|---|---|---|---|
| 365 | 365 - miðlar ehf | Consumer services | Media | Reykjavík | 1986 | Broadcaster, acquired in 2017 |
| 66°North | Sjóklæðagerðin hf | Consumer goods | Personal goods | Reykjavík | 1926 | Outdoor clothing; founded in Suðureyri as Sjóklæðagerð Íslands |
| Air Iceland | Flugfélag Íslands ehf | Consumer services | Travel & leisure | Reykjavík | 1997 | Airline; merged with Icelandair |
| Arctic Trucks | Arctic Trucks Ísland ehf | Industrials | Commercial vehicles & trucks | Reykjavík | 1990 | Exploration and commercial vehicles |
| Arion Bank | Arion Banki hf | Financials | Banks | Reykjavík | 2008 | Nasdaq Iceland: ARION, commercial bank; successor to Kaupþing's domestic operations |
| ÁTVR | Áfengis- og tóbaksverslun ríkisins | Consumer services | Retail | Reykjavík | 1998 | Alcohol/tobacco state monopoly |
| Bónus | Bónus | Consumer services | Retail | Reykjavík | 1989 | No-frills supermarket |
| Brim | Brim hf | Consumer goods | Food & beverage | Reykjavík | 2004 | Nasdaq Iceland: BRIM, fishing; known as HB Grandi until 2019 |
| Carbfix | Carbfix | Industrials | Waste & disposal services | Reykjavík | 2007 | Carbon dioxide mineral storage; owned by Reykjavík Energy |
| Carbon Recycling International (CRI) | Carbon Recycling International | Oil & gas | Alternative energy | Reykjavík | 2006 | Renewable methanol |
| deCODE genetics | Íslensk erfðagreining ehf | Health care | Biotechnology | Reykjavík | 1996 | Gene research; subsidiary of Amgen since 2012 |
| Ölgerðin Egill Skallagrímsson | Ölgerðin Egill Skallagrímsson hf | Consumer goods | Beverages | Reykjavík | 1913 | Brewery and soft drinks; oldest brewery in Iceland |
| Eimskipafélag Íslands | Eimskipafélag Íslands hf | Industrials | Marine transportation | Reykjavík | 1914 | Nasdaq Iceland: EIM, The Icelandic Steamship Company |
| Embla Medical | Embla Medical hf | Health care | Medical Equipment | Reykjavík | 1971 | Nasdaq Copenhagen: EMBLA, prosthetics and orthopaedics; parent of Össur, renamed from Össur hf in 2024 |
| Fenris Creations | | Consumer goods | Leisure goods | Reykjavík | 1997 | Video game developer of Eve Online; known as CCP Games until 2026; owned by Pearl Abyss 2018–2026 |
| FRISK Software International | Friðrik Skúlason ehf | Technology | Software | Reykjavík | 1993 | Antivirus software; acquired by CYREN in 2012 |
| Hagar | Hagar hf | Consumer goods | Food & beverage | Kópavogur | 2003 | Food holding, includes Hagkaup and Bónus |
| Hagkaup | Hagkaup | Consumer services | Retail | Reykjavík | 1959 | Hypermarket chain |
| HS Orka | HS Orka hf | Utilities | Electricity | Grindavík | 1974 | Privately owned geothermal power producer; operates the Svartsengi and Reykjanes plants |
| Icelandair | Icelandair ehf | Consumer services | Travel & leisure | Reykjavík | 1937 | Airline |
| Icelandair Group | Icelandair Group hf | Consumer services | Travel & leisure | Hafnarfjörður | 1937 | Nasdaq Iceland: ICEAIR, travel and tourism group |
| Icelandic Glacial | Icelandic Water Holdings ehf | Consumer goods | Beverages | Ölfus | 2004 | Bottled spring water |
| Isavia | Isavia ohf | Industrials | Industrial transportation | Reykjavík | 2010 | State-owned airport operator and air navigation service provider |
| Íslandsbanki | Íslandsbanki hf | Financials | Banks | Reykjavík | 2008 | Formerly state-owned; privatised in stages from 2021, with the government selling its remaining 45.2% stake in May 2025 |
| Íslandspóstur | Íslandspóstur hf | Industrials | Industrial transportation | Reykjavík | 1776 | Postal services/shipping |
| Kerecis | Kerecis | Health care | Medical equipment | Ísafjörður | 2009 | Fish-skin wound care grafts; acquired by Coloplast in 2023 |
| Landsbanki | Landsbanki | Financials | Banks | Reykjavík | 1885 | Defunct 2008 |
| Landsbankinn | NBI hf | Financials | Banks | Reykjavík | 2008 | State-owned bank |
| Landsvirkjun | Landsvirkjun | Utilities | Electricity | Reykjavík | 1965 | State-owned National Power Company; largest electricity generator in Iceland |
| Mannvit Engineering | Mannvit hf | Industrials | Industrial engineering | Kópavogur | 2008 | Engineering and consulting; acquired by COWI in 2023 |
| Marel | Marel hf | Industrials | Industrial machinery | Garðabær | 1983 | Food processing equipment; acquired by JBT Corporation in January 2025, forming JBT Marel |
| Marorka | Marorka ehf | Technology | Software | Reykjavík | 2002 | Energy management software and research |
| Mjólkursamsalan | Mjólkursamsalan ehf. | Consumer goods | Food products | Reykjavík | 1927 | Dairy |
| MP Bank | MP Banki hf | Financials | Banks | Reykjavík | 2003 | Investment/commercial bank; merged into Kvika banki in 2015 |
| Nói Síríus | Nói-Siríus hf | Consumer goods | Food & beverage | Reykjavík | 1920 | Chocolates; owned by Orkla ASA |
| Origo | Origo hf | Technology | Computer services | Reykjavík | 1992 | Computer services, software consulting; known as Nýherji until 2018 |
| Orkuveita Reykjavíkur | Orkuveita Reykjavíkur | Utilities | Multiutilities | Reykjavík | 1999 | Reykjavík Energy; municipally owned electricity, geothermal heating and water utility; parent of ON Power and Carbfix |
| Play | Fly Play hf | Consumer services | Travel & leisure | Reykjavík | 2019 | Low-cost airline, ceased operations 2025 |
| Promens | Promens hf | Industrials | General industrials | Kópavogur | 1984 | Packaging, plastics; acquired by RPC Group in 2016 |
| RÚV | Ríkisútvarpið ohf | Consumer services | Media | Reykjavík | 1930 | The Icelandic National Broadcasting Service |
| Samherji | Samherji hf | Consumer goods | Food & beverage | Akureyri | 1983 | Largest fishing company in Iceland |
| Síminn | Síminn hf | Telecommunications | Fixed line telecommunications | Reykjavík | 1906 | Nasdaq Iceland: SIMINN, also provides mobile telecom |
| Sláturfélag Suðurlands | Sláturfélag Suðurlands svf | Consumer goods | Food & beverage | Reykjavík | 1907 | Food producer co-op |
| Sýn | Sýn hf | Telecommunications and Consumer services | Mobile Telecommunications and Media | Reykjavík | 1995 | Broadcaster and telecom; retired the Vodafone Iceland brand in 2025 |
| Teris | Teris | Technology | Software | Kópavogur | 1989 | Financial software; merged with Reiknistofa bankanna in 2012 |
| Wow Air | Wow Air ehf. | Consumer services | Travel & leisure | Reykjavík | 2011 | Low-cost airline, defunct 2019 |

== See also ==
- Economy of Iceland
- List of Icelandic brands
