= List of restaurants in Iceland =

This is a list of notable restaurants in Iceland.

== Restaurants in Iceland ==
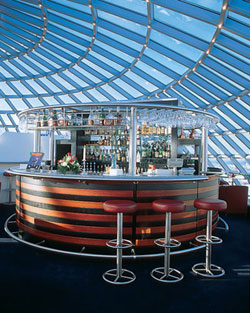
The bar at Perlan

- Hótel Búðir – hotel that originally opened as a guesthouse and fish restaurant. The hotel was completely destroyed by a fire on 21 February 2001, and now has 28 bedrooms and a restaurant that seats 80 people.
- Dill – New Nordic cuisine restaurant in Reykjavík
- Perlan – landmark building in Reykjavík. The top (fifth) floor (fifth floor) of Perlan houses a restaurant Út í bláinn and a café Kaffitár
- ROK – A seafood restaurant in Reykjavík owned by the notable Icelandic actor, Magnús Scheving and his wife, Hrefna Björk Sverrisdóttir
- Serrano – chain of Tex Mex restaurants in Iceland and in Stockholm, Sweden
- A.Hansen – A steakhouse located in Hafnarfjörður in a historic building built in 1880
- Tommi's Burger Joint
- Hamborgarafabrikkan
- Metro - Opened in November 2009 and replaced the three McDonald's restaurants after the chain left the country. Two remain open.

== See also ==
- Icelandic cuisine
- List of companies of Iceland
- List of Icelandic brands
- List of Michelin-starred restaurants in Iceland
- Lists of restaurants
