= Mechanics of Oscar Pistorius's running blades =

Blades used by South African Paralympic runner Oscar Pistorius

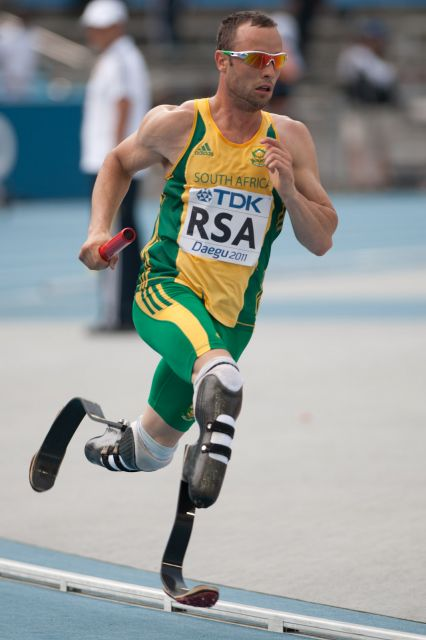
Oscar Pistorius running during the 2011 World Championships in Athletics in Daegu, South Korea

The mechanics of the running blades used by South African former Paralympic runner Oscar Pistorius depend on special carbon-fiber-reinforced polymer prosthetics. Pistorius has double below-the-knee amputations and competed in both non-disabled and T44 amputee athletics events. Pistorius's eligibility to run in international non-disabled events is sanctioned by the International Association of Athletics Federations (IAAF).

Pistorius began running in 2004 after a rugby knee injury which led to rehabilitation at the University of Pretoria's High Performance Centre with coach Ampie Louw. His first racing blades were fitted by South African prosthetist Francois Vanderwatt. Because he was unable to find suitable running blades in Pretoria, Vanderwatt ordered some to be made by a local engineer at Hanger Orthopedic Group. These quickly broke, and Vanderwatt referred Pistorius to American prosthetist and Paralympic sprinter Brian Frasure to be fitted for carbon-fibre blades by Icelandic company Össur.

Pistorius's participation in non-disabled international sprinting competitions in 2007 raised questions about his use of running blades, and the IAAF amended their rules to ban the use of "any technical device that incorporates springs, wheels or any other element that provides a user with an advantage over another athlete not using such a device." After initial studies, Pistorius was ruled ineligible for competitions under these IAAF rules. After further research was presented, the Court of Arbitration (CAS) ruled that his running prostheses were not shown to provide a net competitive advantage over biological legs. In 2012, Pistorius qualified for and competed in both the 2012 Olympic Games and the 2012 Paralympic Games using his running blades, becoming the first amputee sprinter to run in the Olympic Games.

== Pistorius's athletics prostheses ==
The blades are transtibial prostheses, meaning they replace legs and feet that are amputated below the knee. They were developed by medical engineer Van Phillips who incorporated Flex-Foot, Inc. in 1984. In 2000, Van Phillips sold the company to Össur which, as of 2012, still manufactures the blades. They are designed to store kinetic energy like a spring, allowing the wearer to jump and run effectively.

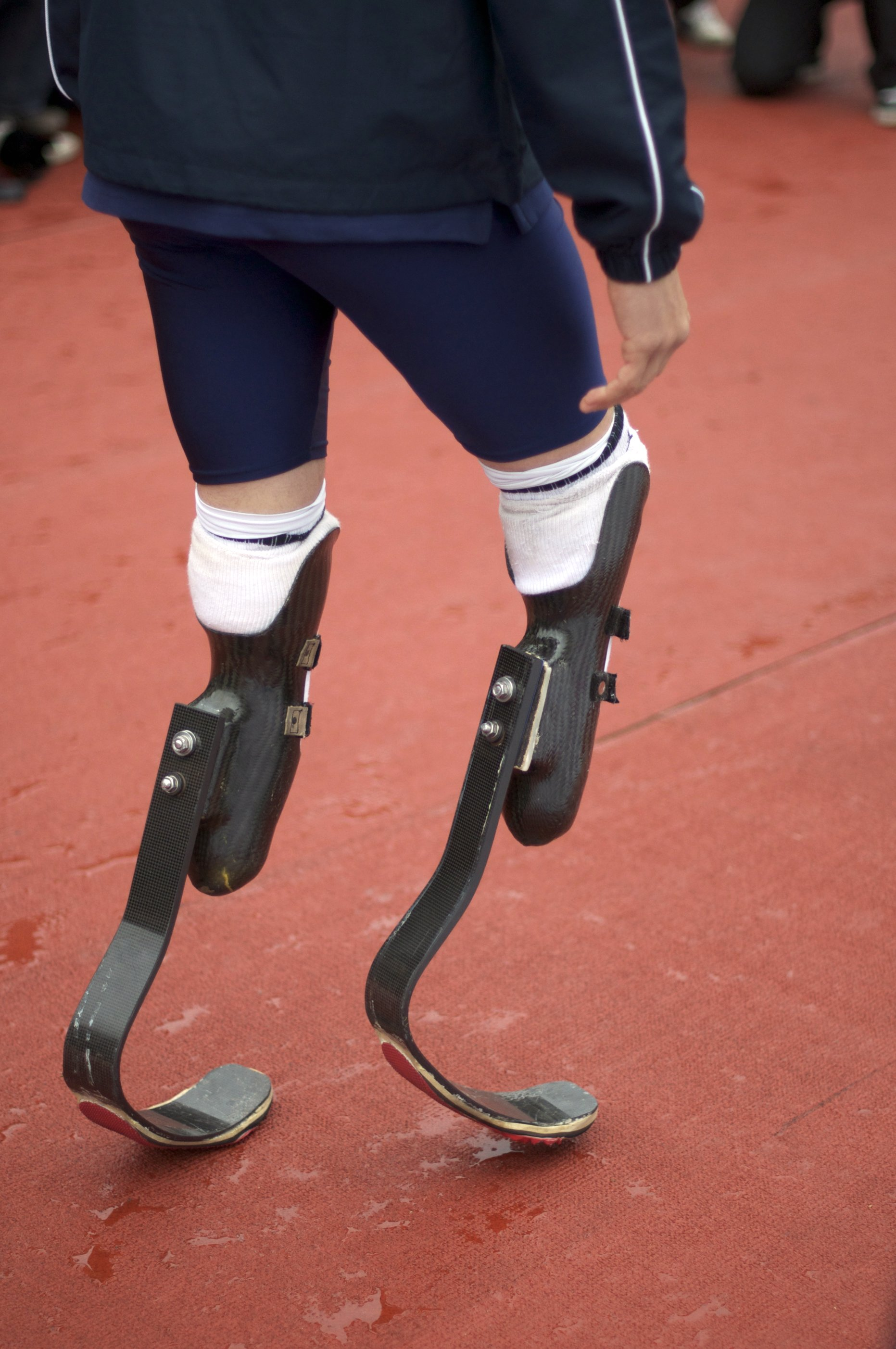
Pistorius wearing Flex-Foot Cheetah blades

Carbon fibre is actually a carbon-fiber-reinforced polymer, and is a strong, light-weight material used in a number of applications, including sporting goods like baseball bats, car parts, helmets, sailboats, bicycles and other equipment where rigidity and high strength-to-weight ratio is important. The polymer used for this equipment is normally epoxy, but other polymers are also used, depending on the application, and other reinforcing fibres may also be included. In the blade manufacturing process, sheets of impregnated material are cut into square sheets and pressed onto a form to produce the final shape. From 30 to 90 sheets may be layered, depending on the expected weight of the athlete, and the mold is then autoclaved to fuse the sheets into a solid plate. This method reduces air bubbles that can cause breaks. Once the result is cooled, it is cut into the shape of the blades. The finished blade is bolted to a carbon fibre socket that is an intimate fit to each of Pistorius' legs. These are custom made and make up the bulk of the total cost, along with the assessment and setting up of the finished prostheses. Each limb costs between $15–18,000 USD.

Pistorius has been using the same Össur blades since 2004. He was born without fibulae and with malformed feet, and his legs were amputated about halfway between knee and ankle so he could wear prosthetic legs. He wears socks and pads which are visible above the sockets to reduce chafing and to prevent blisters, and the sockets have straps in the front that can be tightened to make the prosthesis fit more snugly.

Pistorius uses custom-made spike pads on the blades. Before development of the pads, his spikes were changed by roughing up the surface and applying over-the-counter spikes by hand, but the results using this method were inconsistent. Research was conducted in Össur's Iceland lab using a pressure-sensitive treadmill and film at 500 fps to measure the blade strike, and produced a spike pad which includes a midsole of two machine-molded pieces of foam of different densities to cushion impact, with a carbon fibre plate on the bottom. The developers attached the pad with contact cement, which can be quickly removed with the application of heat when the spike pad needs to be changed.

Because of the curved design, the blades have to be slightly longer than a runner's biological leg and foot would be. The blades replace the hinge of an ankle with elastic compression that bends and releases the blade with every stride, so the uncompressed blade leaves the user standing on tiptoe. They are designed to move forward, so have no heel support in the back. According to Josh McHugh of Wired Magazine, "The Cheetahs seem to bounce of their own accord. It’s impossible to stand still on them, and difficult to move slowly. Once they get going, Cheetahs are extremely hard to control."

== How the blades work ==
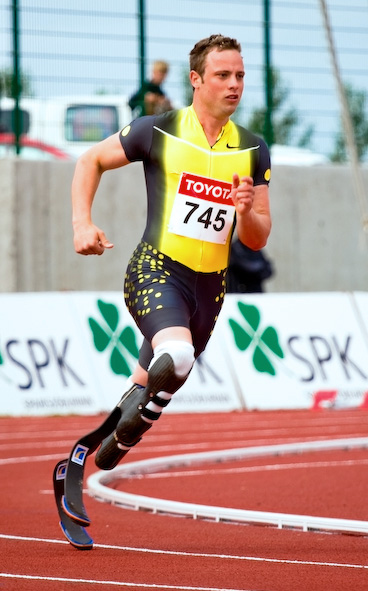
Pistorius running in Iceland in 2007.

In 2007 Pistorius applied to run in non-disabled track meets. He was at first accepted, but questions quickly arose about whether the blades give him an unfair advantage. After initial research showed the blades did provide an advantage, the International Association of Athletics Federations (IAAF) changed their rules to ban the use of technical devices that provide an advantage and ruled him ineligible to compete. Pistorius challenged the ruling with additional research and was reinstated by the Court of Arbitration for Sport (CAS) in 2008, meaning that he can continue to run in non-disabled meets as long as he uses the equipment that was studied in the research.

Pistorius's performance in the early non-disabled races raised questions because of two major concerns: his pattern of running the races and his leg-swing times. Most sprinters spring out of the blocks with their fastest time and slow down as the race progresses, but Pistorius ran a "negative split", starting slowly and building up speed in the last half of the race (though he no longer uses this pattern). His average time was also less in the 400m race when compared to other runners than in the 200m. Controversy about the use of the blades persists, but the research provided considerable information on how they work in application, and other research is expected to follow.

Non-disabled sprinters have calves and ankles that return and amplify the energy supplied by their hips and knees, while Pistorius compensates with additional work because he does not have calves and ankles with their associated tendons and muscles. An analysis published by Engineering & Technology magazine estimates that in using the blades, Pistorius must generate twice the power from his gluteal and quadriceps muscles that a normal sprinter would. Other sources also credit core abdominal muscles and a faster arm swing. His trainer estimates that about 85% of his power comes from his hips and the rest from his knees. This results in a gait that waddles slightly, as Pistorius swings his upper body to balance the springing action of the blades. The blades compress under his weight, then release as he moves forward, providing forward thrust from the tips as they return to their molded shape. As they spring off, he swings them slightly out to the side and throws them forward for the next stride.

Pistorius is always slow in starting a race because the flexible blades do not provide thrust out of the blocks. Pistorius must begin from an awkward position, swing his leg to the outside and pop straight up from the blocks to begin running, when the preferred method is to push off with horizontal force. For the first 30 meters of a race, he keeps his head down and takes short, quick strides. As he establishes a rhythm, he can raise his head and increase his speed. While some runners jog up and down, losing energy, Pistorius directs energy forward, looking somewhat like he is rolling on wheels. He also compensates for the adjustments ankles make on the turns, breaking the curves into short, straight lines. According to his coach Ampie Louw, Pistorius may be able to use the inward lean to generate force and come out of a turn going faster.

== Research ==
=== Brüggemann study ===
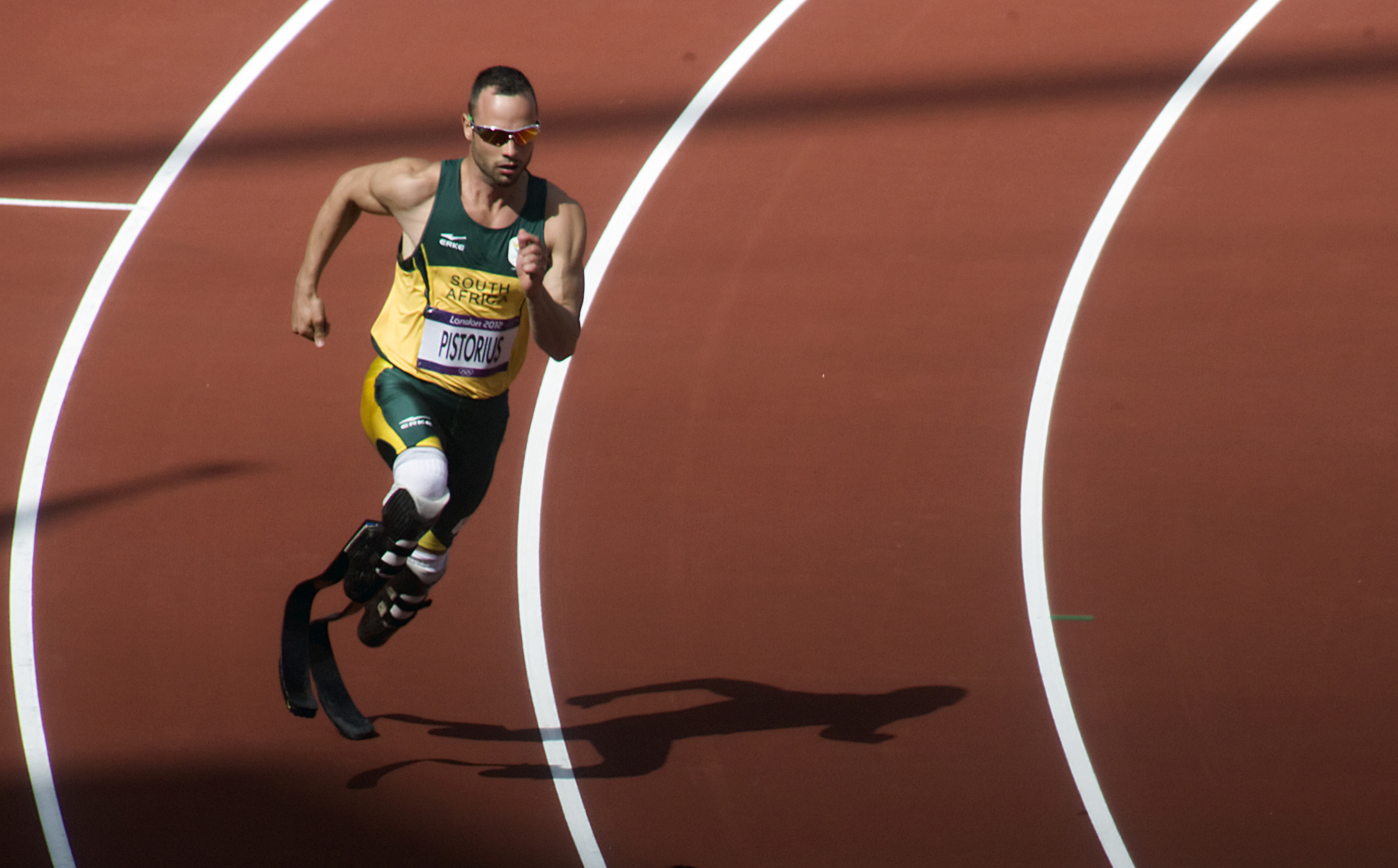
Pistorius running in the first round of the 400m at the 2012 Summer Olympics in London

To resolve questions about the blades, Pistorius was asked to take part in a series of scientific tests in November 2007 at the German Sport University Cologne with Professor of Biomechanics Peter Brüggemann and IAAF technical expert Elio Locatelli. After two days of tests, Brüggemann reported that Pistorius used about 25% less energy expenditure than non-disabled athletes once he achieved a given speed. The study also found that he showed major differences in sprint mechanics, with significantly different maximum vertical ground return forces, and that the positive work or returned energy was close to three times higher than that of a human ankle. The energy loss in the blade during stance phase when the foot was on the ground was measured as 9.3%, while that of normal ankle joint was measured at 42.4%, showing a difference of more than 30%. Brüggemann's analysis stated that the blades allowed lower energy consumption at the same speed, and that the energy loss in the blade is significantly less than in a human ankle at maximum speed. In December of that year, Brüggemann stated to Die Welt newspaper that Pistorius "has considerable advantages over athletes without prosthetic limbs who were tested by us. It was more than just a few percentage points. I did not expect it to be so clear." The study was published in 2008 in Sports Technology, but later researchers stated that the analysis "did not take enough variables into consideration". Commentators have also argued that the IAAF study did not accurately determine whether Cheetahs confer a net advantage because measuring the net advantage or disadvantage conferred on an athlete using Cheetahs is not possible given current scientific knowledge. Second, the IAAF study may not have measured Pistorius's performance against appropriate controls. IAAF used five non-disabled athletes, who run 400-meter races in similar times to Pistorius, as controls. However, because Pistorius was relatively new to the sport of running, he may not have trained enough to maximize his physical potential and reach his peak performance when the IAAF study was conducted. In March 2007, approximately 9 months before the IAAF study was conducted, Pistorius's coach commented that Pistorius had not trained enough to achieve an upper body commensurate with the upper bodies of most elite sprinters. To obtain the most accurate understanding of how the prostheses affect Pistorius's performance, he should be compared to athletes with similar physical potential. Consequently, the IAAF study may have been flawed because it compared Pistorius, who might have the physical potential to run faster than his current times, against athletes at their peak.

=== Weyand, et al. study ===
In 2008 a team of seven researchers conducted tests at Rice University, including Peter Weyand, Hugh Herr, Rodger Kram, Matthew Bundle and Alena Grabowski. The team collected metabolic and mechanical data by indirect calorimetry and ground reaction force measurements on Pistorius's performance during constant-speed, level treadmill running, and found that the energy usage was 3.8% lower than average values for elite non-disabled distance runners, 6.7% lower than for average distance runners and 17% lower than for non-disabled 400m sprint runners. At sprinting speeds of 8.0, 9.0 and 10.0 m/s, Pistorius produced longer foot to ground contact times, shorter leg swing times, and lower average vertical forces than able bodied sprinters. The team concluded that running on the blades appears to be physiologically similar but mechanically different from running with biological legs. The study was published several months later in the Journal of Applied Physiology. Kram also stated that Pistorius's "rate of energy consumption was lower than an average person but comparable to other high-caliber athletes".

The lightness and rigidity of the blade compared to muscle and bone may allow blade runners to swing their legs faster than non-disabled runners. In comments on the article, Peter Weyand and biomechanist Matthew Bundle noted that the study found that Pistorius re-positioned his legs 15.7% faster than most world record sprinters, allowing for a 15–30% increase in sprint speed.

=== Grabowski, et al. study ===
In 2008 a research team including Alena Grabowski, Rodger Kram and Hugh Herr conducted a follow-up study of single amputees with running blades which was published in Biology Letters. Each of six amputees' affected leg performance was compared against that of their biological leg. The team measured leg swing times and force applied to the running surface on a high-speed treadmill at the Biomechanics Laboratory of the Orthopedic Specialty Hospital, and also studied video of sprint runners from the Olympics and Paralympics. They found no difference in leg swing times at different speeds, and recorded leg swing times similar to that of non-disabled sprinters. They also found that single running blades reduced the foot to ground force production of the tested runners by an average of 9%. Because force production is generally considered the most significant factor in running speed, the researchers concluded that this reduction in force limited the sprinters' top speed. Grabowski also found that amputees typically increased their leg swing times to compensate for the lack of force.

=== Other discussion ===
Discussion continues about the relative advantage or disadvantage of using the blades. Researchers and analysts also point out that the research studies are done on level, stationary treadmills, and do not measure performance from starting blocks or on actual curved tracks. They also do not take into account differences in physiology between amputees and non-amputees, who have such factors as musculature, blade height and weight and differences in blood circulation patterns due to the history of their limb loss.

== 2012 Paralympics ==
A controversy over the effects of running blade length arose at the 2012 Paralympic Games, as Brazilian runner Alan Oliveira and USA runner Blake Leeper changed to longer running blades within a few months before the 2012 Paralympic Games. This led to marked improvement in their running times. Pistorius complained after the 200m race that the blades provided artificially lengthened running strides, which would be an infringement of the IPC rules, regardless of that the blades were within the allowable height limits for the athletes concerned. His complaint was supported by single-leg runners including Jerome Singleton and Jack Swift, who called for the T43 double blade and T44 single blade classes to be separated in future events, as single blade runners were unable to adjust the height of the prostheses, and must always match the length of their biological leg with a running blade.

The improvement in running time and the wide broadcast of the race results provided a public demonstration of how the blade length affects performance. Pistorius' stride length was actually 9% longer (2.2 m vs 2.0 m), but Oliveira took more strides (99 vs 92). The combination of stride length and stride rate led to a clearly unusual performance with the longer blades. Pistorius's management issued a statement saying that Pistorius is always 1.84 meters tall, regardless of what prostheses he wears, and that the decision to maintain this height for his running blades was an issue of fairness.
