= Rhodia (company) =

Defunct chemical conglomerate

Rhodia S.A.
- Type: Privately held Société Anonyme
- Industry: Chemicals
- Founded: 1998
- Headquarters: La Défense, France
- Key people: Jean-Pierre Clamadieu (chairman), Gilles Auffret (CEO)
- Products: Polyamides, cellulose acetate tow, sulphuric acid, surfactants, polymers, phosphorus derivatives, silica, energy supply management
- Revenue: €5.226 billion (2010)
- Operating income: €602 million (2010)
- Net income: €259 million (2010)
- Total assets: €5.131 billion (end 2010)
- Total equity: ▼ (€288 million) (end 2010)
- Owner: Solvay
- Number of employees: 26,257 (end 2023)
- Website: www.rhodia.com

Rhodia was a group founded in 1988 that specialized in fine chemistry, synthetic fibers, and polymers.

The company was acquired by the Belgian Solvay group in September 2011 in a deal valued at €3.4 billion. The company served the consumer goods, automotive, energy, manufacturing, and processes and electronics markets, and had 65 production sites worldwide, four research centers, and four joint laboratories.

== History ==
Rhodia was a public company that was founded on January 1, 1998, following the spin-off of the chemicals, fibers, and polymers activities of Rhône-Poulenc when it merged with the German company Hoechst. On June 25, 1998, Rhône-Poulenc sold 32.7% of its share in Rhodia's capital to the public. In 1999, Rhodia made two acquisitions:

- The Engineering Plastics activity of the top Korean group Hyosung, for Rhodia's Polyamides business unit.
- The Iberica Mix & Fix Center activity of Quimica Dos. The Mix & Fix Center is a unit that formulates and sells ready-to-use hot vulcanizable silicone Elastomers.

From October 1999, Rhône-Poulenc, which became Aventis then Sanofi-Aventis, gradually reduced its stake in Rhodia's capital. It sold all its shares in the company on October 17, 2006.

Rhodia grew in the United Kingdom and the United States by buying out Albright and Wilson and ChiRex. In 2002, Rhodia sold off its basic chemical activities in Europe (phenol, hydrochloric acid, sodium carbonate) and its holdings in Latexia (which was the world's number two for latex for paper) and Teris (treatment of toxic waste). In 2004, Rhodia sold its food ingredients business. On March 31, 2004, Yves-René Nanot was appointed chairman of the board of directors.

In 2006, Rhodia sold its latex business, its synthesis activity, and its facilities for the production of industrial wires and fibers in Europe. 2006 also saw the creation of Orbeo, a joint venture with Société Générale, in the field of origination, trade and sale of carbon credits. Orbeo represents 8% of the carbon market.

In 2007, Rhodia sold its silicones production activity and its Nylstar subsidiary (synthetic textile fiber) and acquired the alumina activity of WR Grace. In 2008, Rhodia sold its fine organic chemicals and pharmaceutical activities. On March 17, 2008, the board of directors appointed Jean-Pierre Clamadieu as the chairman and CEO of Rhodia. This appointment followed the resignation of Yves-René Nanot from his position as the chairman of the board of directors as a result of the statutory conditions applying to age limits.

In 2009, Rhodia acquired two companies: OneCarbon International and the McIntyre Group (specialized surfactants, United States). In 2009, the Belgian chemicals group Solvay launched a friendly public takeover bid for Rhodia. In 2010, Rhodia acquired an 87% stake in the capital of Feixiang Chemicals. On January 1, 2011, Rhodia set up a new organization. Operational activities are now organized in 11 business units, in five sectors of activity: Consumer Chemicals, Advanced Materials, Polyamide Materials, Acetow & Eco Services, and Energy Services. The additional Support Function Group includes corporate activities.

On March 8, 2011, Rhodia announced the finalization of the acquisition of the Suzhou HiPro Polymers guar derivatives production plant in Zhangjiagang, China and on April 13, 2011, Rhodia completed the acquisition of the engineering plastics activity of the Indian company PI Industries Ltd (PIIL), following the approval of the Indian authorities.

In September 2011, Solvay's tender offer on Rhodia was completed and Rhodia became a sector of the Solvay group.

=== Debt from Rhône-Poulenc ===
After its breakaway from Rhône-Poulenc, Rhodia had to cope with the repercussions of soil pollution and financial liabilities. Prominent figures, such as Thierry Breton and the Swiss banker Édouard Stern, were involved in trying to work out solutions. The group's balance sheet-based structure remained fragile due to negative equity. On December 31, 1999, Rhodia's debt inherited from the split with Rhône-Poulenc amounted to €1,540 million. In an attempt to solve the group's debt problem, management renegotiated a debt estimated at €1 billion in 2010 (Rhodia's lowest debt level since the group was created). Declared tangible investments in 2009 totaled €167 million, compared with €241 million in 2008.

=== Commitment to Sustainable Development ===
In 2003, Rhodia set up a department dedicated to sustainable development. In 2007, it rolled out the "Rhodia Way", the group's reference framework of responsibilities toward stakeholders. Group employees can use this reference system to self-assess the performance of their entity in terms of social and environmental responsibility, to encourage more responsible practices.

== Group activities ==
=== Consumer Chemicals ===
Consumer Chemicals is made up of three business units: Novecare, Coatis, and Aroma Performance, which mainly service the consumer markets. In 2010, Consumer Chemicals posted revenues of €1,883 million, representing 36% of the Rhodia Group's revenue.22Breakdown of revenue by market sector in 2010.

- <15% oil and gas,
- >10% agrochemicals,
- about 35% consumer goods,
- about 25% manufacturing and processing,
- about 15% construction and coatings.

==== Novecare ====
Novecare supplies high-performance chemicals to industries in the cosmetics, detergents, agrochemicals, coatings, oilfield and industrial applications sectors. The company has 15 production plants worldwide. Novecare acquired the activities of the US company McIntyre, followed by the activities of Feixiang, China's leading producer of amines and surfactants in 2010. Consequently, Rhodia is now the leading producer of specialized surfactants in Asia. With a turnover of €1,089 million in 2010, Novecare accounts for 58% of Consumer Chemicals’ revenue.

==== Coatis ====
Coatis principally supplies the paint, surface coatings, automotive, wood and construction industries with phenol, phenol derivatives and oxygenated solvents. The company has one production plant in Brazil and three technical development centers. With a turnover of €449 million in 2010, Coatis represents 24% of Consumer Chemicals’ revenue.

==== Aroma Performance ====
As the world's leading producer of diphenols, Aroma Performance supplies aromas and fragrances. Key products include vanillin and ethylvanillin, but also hydroquinone or catechol. Aroma Performance is active worldwide in markets in Europe, Asia, South America, and North America. The company has five manufacturing plants worldwide. With a turnover of €345 million, Aroma Performance accounts for 18% of Consumer Chemicals revenue.

==== Polyamide & Intermediates ====
Polyamide & Intermediates produces polyamide 6.6 and intermediates based on adipic acid for the automotive industry, sports apparel, leisure activities, construction, and electrical and electronic components. The entity covers the complete polyamide chain, from the production of intermediates and polymers to the development of high-added-value technical plastics. Polyamide & Intermediates has seven production plants and two technical development centers worldwide.

=== Acetow & Eco Services ===
Acetow & Eco Services is active in the energy and consumer goods markets. The branch includes the Acetow and Eco Services business units. With a turnover of €790 million in 2010, Acetow & Eco Services accounts for 15% of the Rhodia Group's revenue. Breakdown of revenue by market sector: about 65% consumer goods, about 20% energy, and 15% others.

==== Acetow ====
Acetow is the third-largest producer of industrial textiles made of cellulose acetate particles. Its main markets are in Europe, the CIS, Asia, and Latin America. Acetow is the world's third largest producer of cellulose acetate for cigarette filters, supplying about 18% of the worldwide market. The company has five production plants worldwide. With a turnover of €539 million in 2010, Acetow represents 68% of the Acetow & Eco Services combined revenue.

==== Eco Services ====
Eco Services is a service company that regenerates sulfuric acid for the chemical industry and oil refineries in North America. Sulfuric acid is used as a catalyst in the production of alkylate, one of the fundamental components of high-octane index gasoline. The Eco Services network is made up of eight production units on seven different sites in California, Texas, Louisiana, and Indiana. Two of them also provide chemical waste treatment services.

In 2010, Eco Services posted a turnover of €251 million, which accounts for 32% of the Acetow & Eco Services activities’ revenue.

=== Energy Services ===
Energy Services is responsible for energy supplies and the management of Rhodia's projects to reduce greenhouse gas emissions. Energy management embraces the purchasing, production, and sale of energy. In the field of purchasing, mainly of gas and electricity, Energy Services managed €630 million of energy purchases in 2009, 68% of which were for Rhodia's own needs, while the remaining 32% were for third parties, notably for the Group's partners in its joint ventures. In France, Rhodia is the second-biggest industrial buyer of gas and one of the top ten purchasers of electricity. Energy Services has invested in biogas technology by acquiring the Econcern group's share of six biogas production pilots in China and Vietnam. With revenues of €203 million in 2010, Energy Services represents 4% of the Rhodia Group's turnover and operates four industrial plants in Brazil, China, France, and Vietnam. In 2010, Rhodia Energy Services developed its "Climate Care" solutions for the production of energy from renewable biological materials. Two biogas projects in China, and Vietnam and the partnership between the private company Paraiso and Eco Services in Brazil have provided an opportunity to develop a biomass project based on bagasse.

== Production sites ==
Rhodia has 65 production sites worldwide.

=== Worldwide distribution ===
| Continent | Share of Rhodia Revenue | Numbers of sites worldwide | Number of employees |
|---|---|---|---|
| North America | 20% of the Rhodia Group's revenue | 18 sites | 1 700 |
| Asia Pacific | 29% of the Rhodia Group's revenue | 21 sites | 3 400 |
| Latin America | 17% of the Rhodia Group's revenue | 4 sites | 2 800 |
| Europe | 34% of the Rhodia Group's revenue | 22 sites | 6 200 |

=== Main production sites ===
==== Europe ====
Rhodia has 22 production sites in Europe, including 10 in France. The Rhodia Group is present in Germany (Freiburg), Italy (Ospiate), Poland, the Commonwealth of Independent States (CIS) (Sertow LLC), Spain and the United Kingdom.

===== La Rochelle =====
According to ANDRA, the French agency for waste management, until July 1994, Electronics and Catalysis (now Rhodia Rare Earth Systems) used very slightly radioactive monazite as an ore, producing radium-bearing waste, which was initially stored at ANDRA's La Manche center until 1991, then in the French atomic energy commission's Cadarache facility. The treatment of the slightly radioactive monazite produced 8,023 tons (according to ANDRA) of slightly radioactive solid residue up until 1994. According to ANDRA, in 2007, this residue contained 2,000 tons of uranium and 2.6 tons of toxic lead. The plant is subject to ICPE environmental surveillance. A project to launch a recycling plant for the rare earth contained in used lightbulbs is being looked into.

==== Asia-Pacific ====
Rhodia currently includes a Rhodia-Asia-Pacific zone (CIS, Middle East, and Africa), managed by Michel Ybert, with an operational head office in Shanghai. This zone has 21 production sites and accounted for 29% of Rhodia's revenues in 2010. The Asia-Pacific support functions—finance, HR, purchasing, and IT—are based in Singapore The Asia Pacific zone includes production activities in China, Japan, Thailand, India, and Indonesia, plus commercial activities in China, Japan, and Korea.

==== South America ====
The Rhodia Group has three production sites in Brazil and one in Venezuela.

==== North America ====
The Rhodia Group has 18 sites spread across the United States.

=== Former production sites ===
==== Rhodia opération SAS ====
Located on the banks of the Deûle canal, near Lille in Northern France, the ICPE chemical works was founded by Frédéric Kuhlmann, who started with a small two-hectare chemical factory that he bought in 1847. The factory then belonged to the Rhône-Poulenc Chemicals group, which became Rhodia. During a working lifetime of 150 years, the site grew from two to 33 hectares, in the neighborhoods of La Madeleine, Saint-André-lez-Lille and Marquette-lez-Lille.

Between 1961 and 2001, the site produced highly toxic Toluene diisocyanate (TDI), which is one of the basic components used to produce polyurethane foam. Until December 2005, the tar produced by the synthesis of the TDI was incinerated on-site.

The group abandoned the site, and the last remaining remnants—the two 80-meter-high smoke stacks built in 1929 and 1933—were demolished. Until 2006, a store, a plant, and a backup store of oleum remained on the site 3,000 m^{3} of earth from the old branch railway were stored on the site and part of the plot was bought by the FICHAUX coffee roasting company.

===== 2008 report on pollution =====
Various studies, supervised by the French regional agency for industry and research, DRIRE, revealed serious pollution by heavy metals (zinc, copper and lead) almost everywhere on the site, plus mercury and cadmium in one area and nitrates, sulfates, ammonium and arsenic by the Deûle canal. Certain pollutants had percolated into the soil and polluted the surface groundwater: potassium, sulfates, nitrates, nitrites, chlorides, ammonium and sodium, and locally, zinc and cadmium, to depths of up to 2 m in the so-called ANS sector, plus arsenic under the AS/PS sector and manganese under the GMG sector.

This groundwater rose when the industrial pumps were stopped and flooded the basements in nearby houses, requiring permanent pumping to drain the subsoil. Severe pollution by arsenic was discovered up to depths of 5 meters in the AS/PS sector, plus mercury in the northeast half of this same sector The chalk layer under the site was contaminated by sulfates. For these reasons, the local authorities deemed that the site was compatible with industrial usage, but with restrictions to be applied on a case-by-case basis with the potential buyers of the various parts of the site, on a long-term and mandatory basis for third parties through publication in the land registry. The Lille city authorities considered locating a purification plant on the site. Several projects for the industrial, urban, or administrative use of the site are in progress. The position of the site in an area designated as “green belt” on the banks of the Deûle, the pollution, and its highly artificial character make it an important factor in the ecological fragmentation of the regional "blue infrastructure".

== Awards ==
In 2023, Rhodia was named the best company in the Chemical and Petrochemical sector in Brazil for the second consecutive year in by Época Negócios 360º. The ranking evaluated 410 companies with revenues of at least R$250 million in 2022. The evaluation considered various sectors and management challenges like innovation, future vision, ESG/environmental, ESG/governance, people, and financial performance. The Dom Cabral Foundation partnered with Época Negócios for the evaluation process. The award ceremony took place on September 25, bringing together CEOs and executives from top companies in Brazil.

== Governance ==
=== Board of directors ===
The Rhodia Board of Directors currently has 11 members. The articles of association require that no less than three and no more than 18 members sit on the board. Since 2005, members have been appointed for four years. The regulations of the board of directors stipulate that non-executive members can remain on the board for a maximum of 12 years. Renewals are staggered over two consecutive years.

On November 31, the members of the board of directors were:

| Name | Title |
|---|---|
| Jean-Pierre Clamadieu | Président |
| Gilles Auffret | |
| Bernard de Laguiche | |
| Daniel Broens | |
| Michel Defourny | |
| Dominique Dussard | |

=== General management ===
On November 31, 2010, the members of the executive committee were:

- Gilles Auffret, chief executive officer
- Pascal Bouchiat, group executive vice-president and chief financial officer
- Pascal Juery, group executive vice-president
- Jean-Pierre Labroue, general counsel and corporate secretary

=== Previous Rhodia CEOs ===
- 1998 to 2003 : Jean-Pierre Tirouflet, chairman and chief executive officer
- 2003 to 2004 : Chairmanship vacant, Yves-René Nanot, vice-chairman
- 2004 to 2008 : Yves-René Nanot, chairman
- 2008 to 2011 : Jean-Pierre Clamadieu, chairman and chief executive officer.
- Since 2011 : Gilles Auffret, chief executive officer

=== Shareholders ===
Since the successful tender offer was completed in 2011, Rhodia is now part of the Solvay group.

== Key figures ==
=== Rhodia Group data ===
| | 2007 | 2008 | 2009 | 2010 |
|---|---|---|---|---|
| Revenue | 4 781 million euros | 4 763 million euros | 4 031 million euros | 5 226 million euros |
| EBITDA | 758 million euros | 664 million euros | 487 million euros | 905 million euros |
| Net results | 129 million euros | 105 million euros | 132 million euros | 259 million euros |

=== Breakdown by activity in 2010 ===
| Year | Consumer Chemical | Advanced Material | Polyamide Material | Acetow &Eco Service | Energy Service | Corporate& Diver |
|---|---|---|---|---|---|---|
| 2010 | €1 883 million | €539 million | €1 701 million | €790 million | €203 million | €110 million |
