= Sverrisdóttir =

Sverrisdóttir is an Icelandic surname. Notable people with the surname include:

- Guðbjörg Sverrisdóttir (born 1992), Icelandic basketball player
- Helena Sverrisdóttir (born 1988), Icelandic basketball player
- Hildur Sverrisdóttir (born 1978), Icelandic politician
- Hrefna Björk Sverrisdóttir (born 1981), Icelandic businesswoman
- Sigrún Brá Sverrisdóttir (born 1990), Icelandic swimmer
- Valgerður Sverrisdóttir (born 1950), Icelandic politician
- Vilborg Sverrisdóttir (born 1957), Icelandic swimmer
