= Flex-Foot Cheetah =

Prosthetic human foot replacement

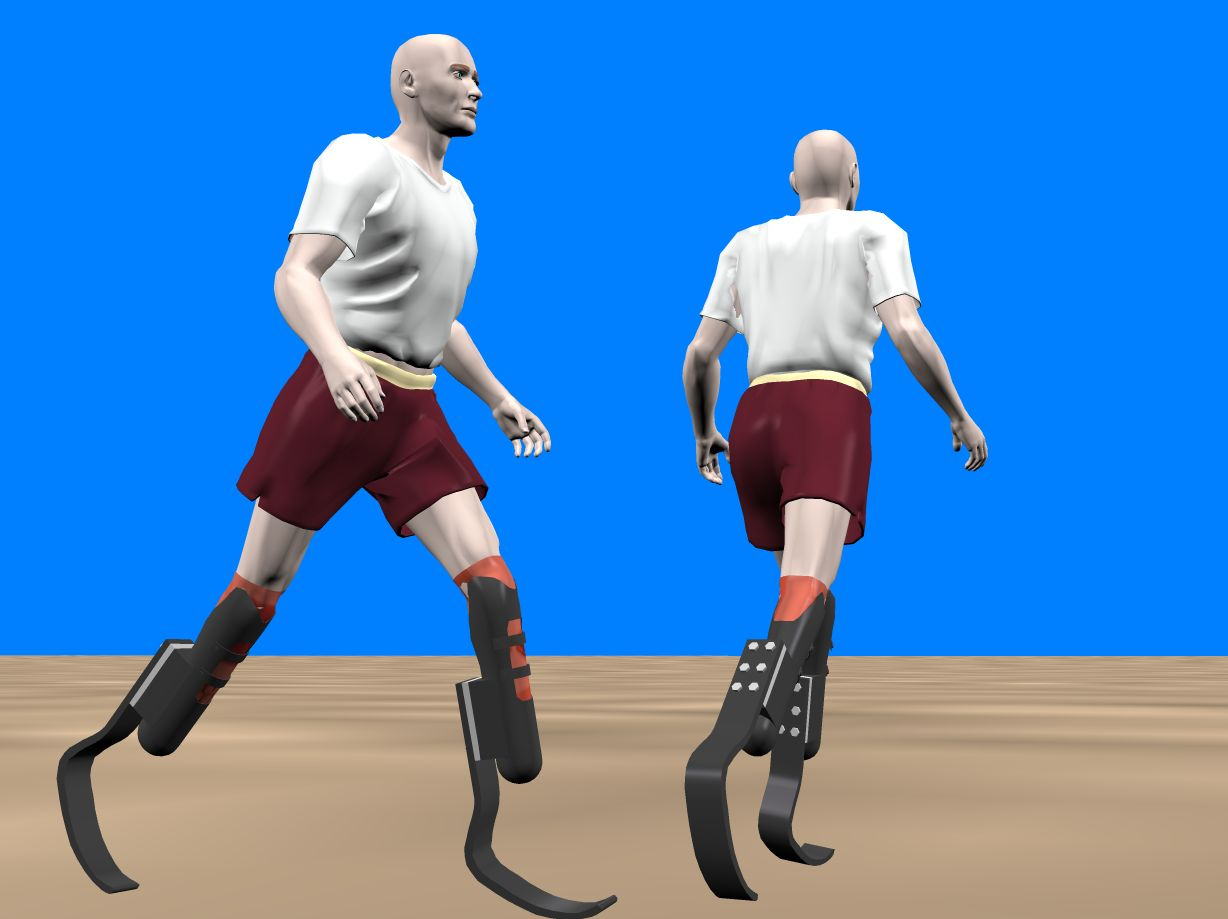
2 "bladerunners" using this sort of prosthetic foot. CGI image

The Flex-Foot Cheetah is a prosthetic human foot replacement developed by biomedical engineer Van Phillips, who had lost a leg below the knee at age 21; the deficiencies of existing prostheses led him to invent this new prosthesis.

The Flex-Foot Cheetah and similar models are worn by Oscar Pistorius and other amputee athletes in the Paralympics and elsewhere. It is made from carbon fibre, and unlike all previous foot prostheses, it stores kinetic energy from the wearer's steps as potential energy, like a spring, allowing the wearer to run and jump. It is now (as of September 2012) made by Össur.

Carbon fibre is actually a carbon-fiber-reinforced polymer, and is a strong, light-weight material used in a number of applications, including sporting goods like baseball bats, car parts, helmets, sailboats, bicycles and other equipment where rigidity and high strength-to-weight ratio is important. The polymer used for this equipment is normally epoxy, but other polymers are also used, depending on the application, and other reinforcing fibers may also be included. In the blade manufacturing process, sheets of impregnated material are cut into square sheets and pressed onto a form to produce the final shape. From 30 to 90 sheets may be layered, depending on the expected weight of the athlete, and the mold is then autoclaved to fuse the sheets into a solid plate. This method reduces air bubbles that can cause breaks. Once the result is cooled, it is cut into the shape of the blades, each of which costs between $15,000 and $18,000.

About 90 percent of amputee Paralympics runners use a variation of the original Flex-Foot design, as well as thousands of athletes around the world. "Bladerunners" seen at the Paralympics who have lost both feet run in the T43 class, but runners with one blade and a natural foot run in the T44 class.

== In popular culture ==
- In the 2015 film Kingsman: The Secret Service, one of the villains, Gazelle, is seen wearing a pair of bladed Flex-Foot Cheetah.
- In Half-Life 2 and the subsequent episodes, Dr. Eli Vance has a Flex-Foot Cheetah prosthetic.
- In the second season of Alice in Borderland, the character Akane Heiya uses a Flex-Foot Cheetah after having her leg amputated.
- In Titanfall 2, the robotic stim pilots use prosthetics inspired by the Flex-Foot Cheetah.

== See also ==
- The Mechanics of Running Blades
