= Jean-Pierre Clamadieu =

French businessman

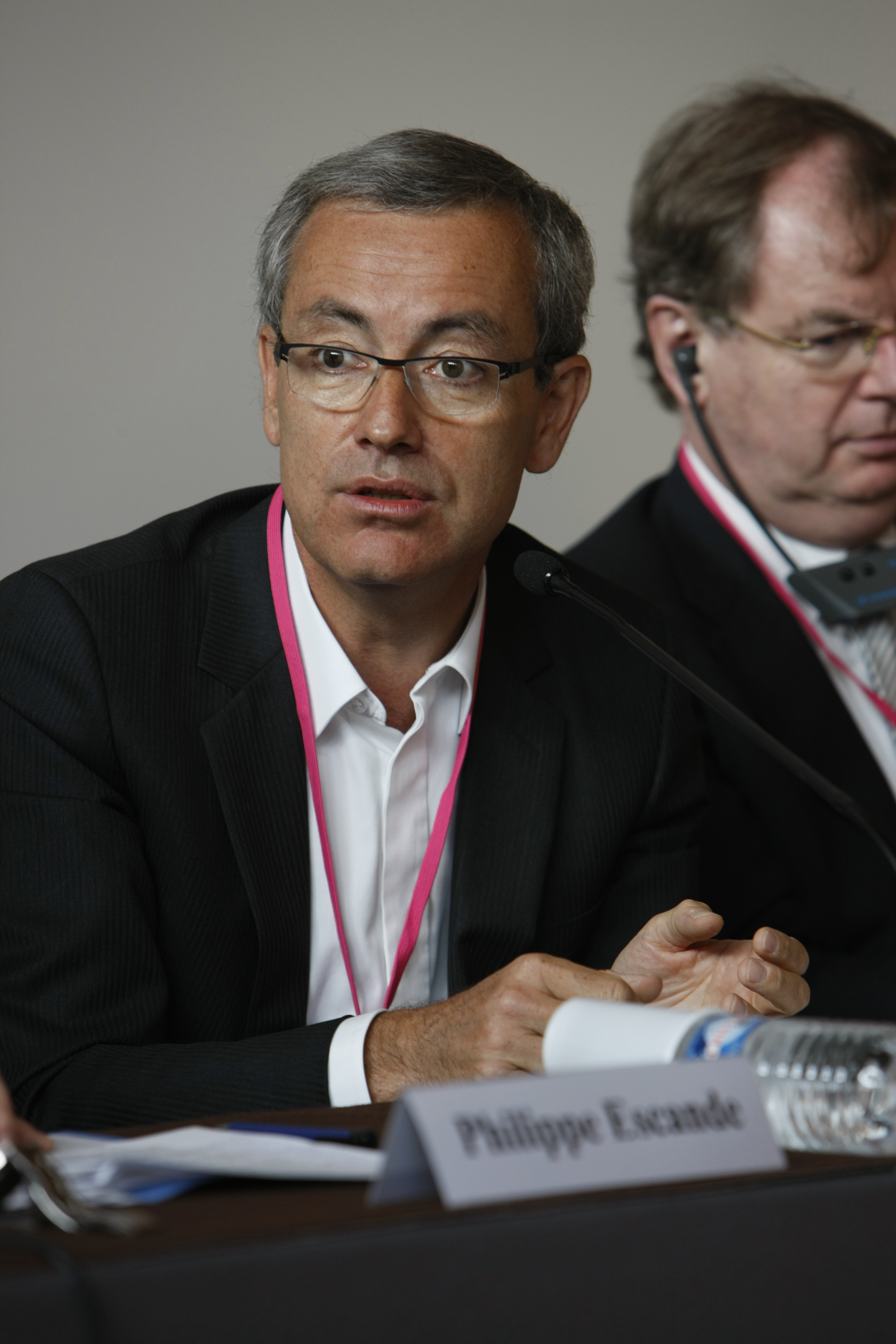
- Clamadieu in 2009
- Born: 15 August 1958 (age 68); Chambéry, France
- Education: Mines ParisTech
- Occupations: Businessman, Chairman of Engie

Jean-Pierre Clamadieu (born 15 August 1958) is a French businessman.

Clamadieu has been the Chairman of Engie since May 2018 and a former chief executive officer of Solvay and member of the board of directors from May 2012 to March 2019. He served chairman of the board and chief executive officer of Rhodia, a French chemical company acquired and integrated into the Belgian group Solvay in September 2011.

Clamadieu has also been member of the boards of AXA (a French insurer) and Airbus. Between 2014 and 2016, he served as president of the European Chemical Industry Council (Cefic). From 2007 to February 2014, he was the chairman of the Sustainable Development Commission of MEDEF and from 2010 to 2015, chairman of the Franco-Brazilian Business Council of MEDEF International.

== Early life and education ==
Clamadieu graduated from Ecole Nationale Superieure des Mines de Paris before becoming chief engineer of the Corps of Mines (class of 1983).

== Career ==
=== Career in the public sector ===
For nine years, Clamadieu worked mainly for the French Ministry of Industry and as technical advisor to the Minister of Labor.

=== Career in the private sector ===
In 1993, Clamadieu joined Rhône-Poulenc to develop new activities in the field of automobile pollution control. In the following years, he held several executive positions in the Rhodia group, as president of Rhodia's Chemicals in Latin America, president of Rhodia Eco Services, senior vice-president for Rhodia corporate purchasing, president of Rhodia Organic Fine Chemicals Division and president of Rhodia Pharmaceuticals & Agrochemicals Division.

In October 2003 Clamadieu was appointed CEO of Rhodia, and became its chairman and CEO in March 2008. In October 2003, while the group was on the edge of bankruptcy, he saved the company and transformed it into a modern and profitable group, well known for its transparency of financial information and its responsible governance.

In April 2011, the Belgian chemical group Solvay started a tender offer on Rhodia and achieved it successfully the same year in September.

In May 2012, Clamadieu was appointed CEO of the new Solvay Group. Four months later, Solvay joined the CAC 40 index replacing PSA Peugeot Citroën.

Since his appointment, Clamadieu led the integration of the new group and its transformation into a major player in the field of speciality chemicals and advanced materials, which combines industrial competitiveness with the quest for sustainable solutions for its clients. Clamadieu also promotes an ambitious a coordinated European energy policy. In May 2018, Clamadieu was appointed chairman of the board of the ENGIE group. He remained chairman and CEO of Solvay until February 2019.

== Other activities ==
=== Corporate boards ===
- TE Connectivity, Chair of the Board of Directors (since 2023)
- Airbus, Member of the Board of Directors
- AXA, Member of the Board of Directors (2012–2023)
- Cytec Industries, Member of the Board of Directors (2015–2019)
- SNCF, Member of the Board of Directors (2008–2013)
- Faurecia, Member of the Board of Directors (2007–2018)

=== Non-profit organizations ===
- Opéra de Paris, chairman of the Board (since 2018)
- International Council of Chemical Associations (ICCA), Member of the Board
- World Business Council for Sustainable Development (WBCSD), Member of the Executive Committee
- Cercle de l'Industrie, Member of the Board of Directors
- French Association of Private Enterprises (AFEP), Member
- European Round Table of Industrialists (ERT), Member
- Institut Montaigne, Member of the Board of Directors
- Mouvement des Entreprises de France (MEDEF), Chairman of the Commission on Sustainable Development (2007-2014)

== Recognition ==
Clamadieu received the title of Knight of the Legion of Honour in December 2005 and Officer of the national order of Merit in May 2009. In October 2012, he was distinguished as the industrialist of the year 2012 and in March 2013, he was elected the 2nd best CEO of CAC 40 companies.
