= Serrano (restaurant) =

Chain of Tex-Mex restaurants in Iceland and Sweden

Coordinates: 64.138783°N 21.937851°W

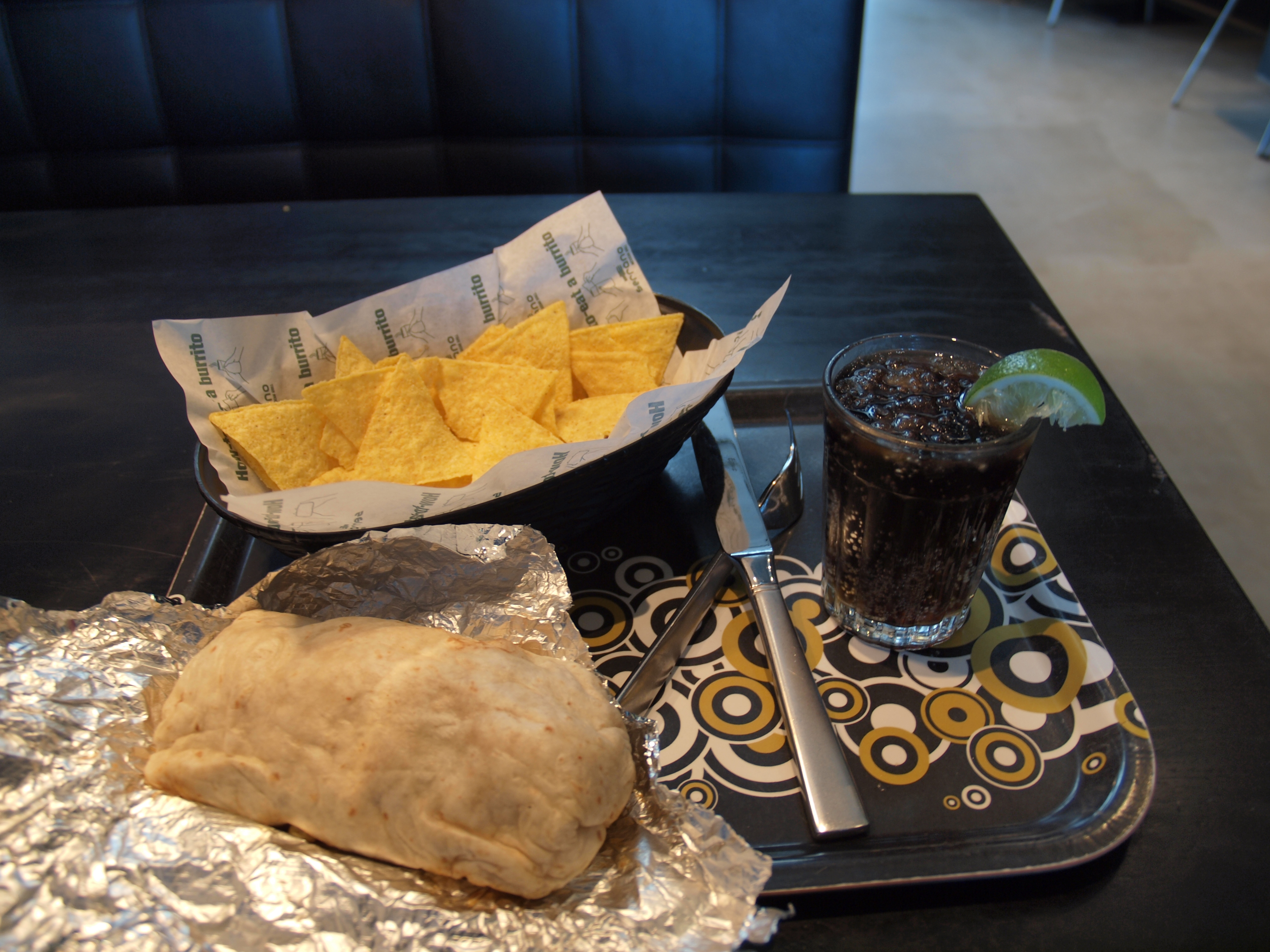
- A burrito at a Serrano restaurant in central Stockholm, Sweden (2012)
- Company type: Private
- Industry: Restaurant
- Genre: Fast casual
- Founded: 2002; 24 years ago in Reykjavík, Iceland
- Founders: Emil Helgi Lárusson; Einar Örn Einarsson
- Headquarters: Reykjavík, Iceland
- Number of locations: 10 (2012)
- Area served: Iceland, Sweden
- Products: Nordic Mexican American cuisine
- Subsidiaries: Zocolo (in Sweden)
- Website: www.serrano.is

Serrano is a chain of Tex-Mex restaurants in Iceland and Stockholm, Sweden, owned by Emil Helgi Lárusson and Einar Örn Einarsson from Iceland. By 2012, the chain had six restaurants in Iceland and four in Sweden, all of which are in the Stockholm area. Serrano's menu consists of burritos, quesadillas, nachos and salads.

The chain was started by Lárusson and Einarsson in Reykjavík in 2002. The first location in Sweden was opened in 2009.

Serrano was voted best fast food restaurant in Sweden by Arla Foods in 2011 and the tastiest restaurant of the year in the 2010 Swedish restaurant gala.

In April 2013, all six restaurants in Sweden were renamed Zocalo.

Einarsson sold all of the shares in the Icelandic restaurants to his partner and co-founder Lárusson in June 2014 while remaining as co-owner of the Swedish Zocalo restaurants with Lárusson.

== See also ==
- List of restaurants in Iceland
