= The Spy Next Door =

2010 American film

- Theatrical release poster
- Directed by: Brian Levant
- Screenplay by: Jonathan Bernstein; James Greer; Gregory Poirier
- Story by: Jonathan Bernstein; James Greer
- Produced by: Robert Simonds
- Starring: Jackie Chan; Amber Valletta; Madeline Carroll; Will Shadley; Magnús Scheving; Billy Ray Cyrus; George Lopez
- Cinematography: Dean Cundey
- Edited by: Lawrence Jordan
- Music by: David Newman
- Production companies: Relativity Media; The Robert Simonds Company
- Distributed by: Lionsgate
- Release date: January 15, 2010 (United States)
- Running time: 94 minutes
- Country: United States
- Language: English
- Budget: $28 million
- Box office: $45.2 million

The Spy Next Door is a 2010 American spy action comedy film directed by Brian Levant, written by Jonathan Bernstein, James Greer and Gregory Poirier, produced by Robert Simonds with music by David Newman. The film stars Jackie Chan, with a supporting cast of Amber Valletta, Magnús Scheving, Madeline Carroll, Will Shadley, Alina Foley, Billy Ray Cyrus, and George Lopez.

Filming started in late October 2008 in Rio Rancho, New Mexico and was finished in late December 2008. The film tributes Chan's films by showing clips, references and even referencing Chan's real life childhood.

The Spy Next Door was released in the United States by Lionsgate on January 15, 2010, and also released on DVD and Blu-ray format on May 18, 2010. The film received negative reviews from critics and it earned $45.2 million on a $28 million budget.

== Plot ==
Bob Ho is an operative of the CIA as an undercover agent on loan from the Chinese Intelligence, who decides to retire after putting Russian terrorist Anton Poldark behind bars and falling in love with his next door neighbor Gillian, who has three kids from previous relationships: Farren (a step-daughter), Ian, and Nora. All of them think Bob works a boring job at a mediocre pen-importing company.

One day, Gillian leaves to visit her father in Denver, Colorado, and leaves Bob to take care of the kids. However, Farren and Ian despise him and plot to get rid of Bob. Using technology from the CIA, Bob takes control and bonds with the kids. Bob's partner, Colton James, informs him that Poldark has escaped from jail, and they suspect a mole in the CIA. Colton sends a file to Bob's computer for a formula for an oil-eating bacteria designed to clean up oil spills, which Poldark stole to weaponize. While snooping around Bob's house, Ian downloads the file, which he mistakes for music, onto his iPod. Poldark discovers the download and sends some of his henchmen to Bob's house, but Bob overpowers them.

After the attack, Bob and the kids hide at a Chinese restaurant, where Poldark's teenage henchman, Larry, tries to kill Bob. Bob defeats him and tells the kids about his job. His boss, Glaze, then arrives and demands the downloaded file, revealing himself to be working for Poldark. Bob knocks out Glaze, then hides in a hotel with the kids. Eventually, Farren tells Gillian over the phone about Bob's secret. As they wait, Farren holds out hope that her biological father will come back to get her so that she can have a "real family". Bob tells Farren that family is more than just sharing blood ties with someone, revealing that he never knew his birth parents and was raised in a group home. Farren then realizes that her father is not coming back and accepts Ian and Nora as her siblings. Fearing for her children's safety, Gillian flies home to take them back and angrily breaks up with Bob.

Bob heads to an abandoned factory to confront the Russian terrorists but finds that Ian, wanting to become a spy, followed him and Farren has run away from home to try to help. The three are captured by the Russians, who trick Ian into revealing that the file is on his iPod. As Poldark, his partner Tatiana, and Glaze go to Gillian's house, Bob and the kids escape and return home, where Poldark and his crew arrive. Bob, Gillian's family, and the terrorists fight, and Colton and his crew arrive to arrest the Russians and Glaze. Gillian initially rejects Bob, but changes her mind when the kids express their heartfelt approval of him with Farren calling Gillian "Mom" for the first time. Bob and Gillian then get married.

== Cast ==
- Jackie Chan as Bob Ho, a spy for the CIA and Gillian's neighbor, boyfriend, and eventual husband
- Amber Valletta as Gillian, Bob's neighbor, girlfriend, and eventual wife
- Magnús Scheving as Anton Poldark, a Russian terrorist
- Madeline Carroll as Farren, Gillian's 13-year-old stepdaughter
- Will Shadley as Ian, Gillian's 9-year-old son
- Alina Foley as Nora, Gillian's 4-year-old daughter
- Billy Ray Cyrus as Colton James, Bob's partner
- George Lopez as Glaze, Bob's corrupt boss
- Lucas Till as Larry, a teenager working with Poldark
- Katherine Boecher as Tatiana Creel, Poldark's girlfriend and henchwoman
- Tim Connolly as Russian thug
- Troy Brenna as Russian thug
- Jeff Chase as Russian thug
- Mark Kubr as Russian thug
- David Mattey as Russian thug
- Scott Workman as Russian thug
- Esodie Geiger as Principal
- Arron Shiver as Scientist
- Richard Christie as Judge

== Soundtrack ==
- "Secret Agent Man" – Performed by Johnny Rivers
- "The Way It Was" – Written and Performed by Daniel May
- "Ba Ma De Hua" – Performed by Jackie Chan (theme song of Rob-B-Hood, a film also made by Chan)
- "One Way or Another" – Performed by Blondie

== Release ==
=== Box office ===
In its first weekend, in the US, The Spy Next Door made $9.7 million in 2,924 theaters, opening at #6. It grossed $12.9 million over the four-day period, ranking #5 on that term. The film grossed $45.1 million on a $28 million budget.

=== Critical reception ===
On Rotten Tomatoes the film has an approval rating of 12% based on 91 reviews, with an average rating of 3.5/10. The site's critical consensus reads, "Lacking a script funny enough to cover up for Jackie Chan's fading physical gifts, The Spy Next Door fails on every conceivable level." On Metacritic, which assigns a normalized rating to reviews, it holds an average score of 27 out of 100 based on 21 critics, indicating "generally unfavorable reviews". Audiences polled by CinemaScore gave the film an average grade of "A−" on an A+ to F scale.

Most film critics targeted the film for "lacking a script," and "looking old" such as Michael Phillips of The Chicago Tribune for being "True Lies without the striptease or the Arab-maiming". Lael Loewenstein of Variety gave the film a negative review saying the film's "cartoonish jokes and misfired gags are likely to elicit more eye rolls than laughs." Daniel Eagan of The Hollywood Reporter also disliked the film saying most of the film is "pretty tired stuff from Pacifier-style slapstick to comic relief delivered by, of all people, erstwhile country star Billy Ray Cyrus" and that Chan "seems stiff" and "clad in unattractive clothes and forced into dumbed-down situations." David Stratton of At the Movies dismissed the film calling it "a sad viewing experience". He added "The woeful screenplay, the mundane direction, by Brian Levant, and the indifferent acting all combine to sink a stupid plot which should never have got off the ground." Carrie Rickey of The Philadelphia Inquirer gave the film 2½ stars. Rickey, giving the film the benefit of the doubt, wrote "The plot may be forgettable, but the execution is frantic and funny. The Spy Next Door is a movie that will bring smiles to kids – and their grandparents."

=== Home media ===
The Spy Next Door was released on DVD and Blu-ray on May 18, 2010.

== Awards and nominations ==
Award	Category	Nominee	Result
Razzie Award	Worst Supporting Actor	Billy Ray Cyrus, George Lopez	Nominated

== See also ==
- The Pacifier
- True Lies
- Man of the House
- Kindergarten Cop
- Big Momma's House
- LazyTown
