= Ragnheiður Melsteð =

Icelandic businesswoman (born 1971)

Ragnheiður Pétursdóttir Melsteð
- Born: 6 May 1971 (age 54); Reykjavík, Iceland
- Height: 172 cm (5 ft 8 in)
- Spouse: Magnús Scheving (m. 1989; div. 2014)
- Children: 2

Ragnheiður Pétursdóttir Melsteð (Icelandic: [ˈrakn̥eiːðʏr ˈmɛlstɛθ]; born 6 May 1971) is the co-founder and former executive producer of LazyTown Entertainment.

== Personal life ==
Ragnheiður was born to Valgerður Hanna and Pétur Melsteð, who was a known hairdresser in Iceland and was in charge of a magazine called Hár og fegurð for 25 years.

She was married to Magnús Scheving from 1989 until their divorce in 2014. They have a daughter and a son.
