= Húsasmiðjan =

Chain of hardware stores based in Reykjavík, Iceland

Húsasmiðjan (Icelandic pronunciation: [ˈhuːsaˌsmɪðjan], lit. 'House Workshop'; also rendered as Húsasmidjan) is chain of hardware stores based in Reykjavík, Iceland. Founded in 1956, it is the largest hardware and DIY chain in Iceland. In late 2011, after being burdened with charges of accounting discrepancies, price fixing and overleveraging in the wake of the 2008–2012 Icelandic financial crisis, Húsasmiðjan was sold to the Danish DIY chain Bygma. The company, including its subsidiaries Blómaval, Ískraft and HGG, currently operates in 31 locations in Iceland.
