= Van Phillips (inventor) =

American inventor of prosthetics (born 1954)

Van Phillips (born 1954) is an American inventor of prosthetics.

== Biography ==
He is known for the Flex-Foot brand of artificial foot and limbs that he created, and for his charity work for amputees. An amputee himself, having lost a leg below the knee at age 21, Phillips was motivated by the limitations of then-existing artificial limbs to attend the Northwestern University Medical School Prosthetic-Orthotic Center. After graduation, he worked as a biomedical design engineer at the University of Utah before starting his own company, Flex-Foot Incorporated in 1984.

Phillips ultimately created a workable artificial foot made from carbon graphite. Unlike all previous prostheses, it stored kinetic energy from the wearer's steps as potential energy, like a spring, allowing the wearer to run and jump. A prosthetic foot that he created, the Flex-Foot Cheetah, is used by double-amputee and Paralympics gold-medalist Oscar Pistorius, and about 90 percent of Paralympics participants use a variation of the original Flex-Foot design, as well as thousands of people around the world. Phillips sold Flex-Foot to Össur in 2000, which continues to manufacture the artificial foot.

In 1999 he established Second Wind, a non-profit organization to provide inexpensive and resistant prostheses to amputees around the world, and is now working to create a prosthetic leg for land mine victims in developing countries. In 1998 he received the Brian Blatchford Memorial Prize from the International Society for Prosthetics and Orthotics.

== See also ==
- Össur#Prosthetics
