= JBT Corporation =

American food processing machinery and automated vehicle company

JBT Marel Corporation
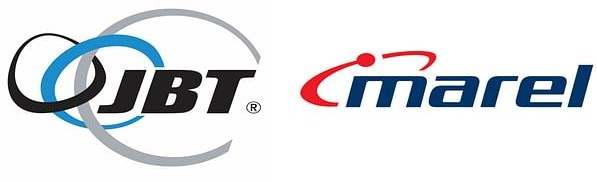
- Company type: Public
- Traded as: NYSE: JBTM; S&P 600 component
- Founded: 1884 (as the Bean Spray Pump Company); 1928 (as Food Machinery Corporation); 2001 (spun off in FMC Technologies, Inc) 2008 (divested as JBT Corporation); 2025 JBT Marel Corporation
- Headquarters: 333 West Wacker Drive; Chicago, Illinois, United States
- Key people: Brian A. Deck (CEO); Árni Sigurdsson (President)
- Products: Food and beverage processing, automated guided vehicle systems
- Brands: A&B Process Systems, alco, AutoCoding Systems, Avure Technologies, Bevcorp, (C.A.T.), Double D, DSI, Formcook, FranRica, Fresh’n Squeeze, Frigoscandia, FTNON, MEPSCO, Morel, Northfield, PLF International, Prevenio, Prime Equipment Group, Proseal, Schröder, SF&DS, Stein, TIPPER TIE, Urtasun, Wolf-tec
- Revenue: ▲$2,166 Million USD (2022)
- Net income: ▲$130.7 Million USD (2022)
- Number of employees: approx 5,200 (2023)
- Website: www.jbtc.com

JBT Marel Corporation, formerly known as JBT Corporation, or John Bean Technologies Corporation, is a food processing machinery and automated vehicle company. The company was incorporated in 2008 when FMC Technologies divested its non-energy businesses. The company is based in Chicago, Illinois and traces its history back to a company founded in 1884 by John Bean, an orchardist in Los Gatos, California.

In January 2025, JBT Corporation completed its proposed acquisition of Marel and subsequently changed its corporate name to JBT Marel Corporation

== History ==
=== The Bean Spray Pump Company ===
Founded in 1884 as the Bean Spray Pump Company in Los Gatos, California by orchardist John Bean. The company's first product was a piston pump, which Bean invented the pump to spray insecticide on the many fruit orchards in the area. A Bean sprayer is on display at the Forbes Mill museum there. Bean Avenue in downtown Los Gatos is named after John Bean.

=== FMC ===
In 1928, Bean Spray Pump purchased Anderson-Barngrover Co. and Sprague-Sells, and changed its name to Food Machinery Corporation, and began using the initials FMC. FMC received a contract to design and build landing vehicles tracked for the United States War Department in 1941. FMC also built the M113 (APC) Armored Personnel Carrier and the Bradley Fighting Vehicle as well as the XR311 at its former facility in Santa Clara, California. The troubled development of the Bradley was satirized in the 1998 HBO movie The Pentagon Wars. In the movie FMC was fictionalized as A.O.C corporation. Bean also manufactured fire fighting equipment in the 1960s through the 1980s under the FMC and the Bean names.

FMC also produced fire truck fire pumps and pumper bodies, and had an OEM arrangement with LTI (Ladder Towers Inc.) to market aerial ladders. In the early 1980s the Fire apparatus division of FMC tried to expand its role in aerial ladders on fire trucks, leveraging the Link-Belt crane division. FMC was ultimately unsuccessful in its expansion into production of aerial ladders. The FMC Fire Apparatus division was also ultimately shut down in 1990.

=== Spinoffs ===
In 1946, FMC bought out Bolens Lawn And Garden Equipment. FMC changed names again in 1948, becoming Food Machinery and Chemical Corporation. In 1961 the name was changed to FMC Corporation.

In 1967, the FMC Corporation merged with the Link-Belt Company. The company produced FMC Link-Belt branded cranes and excavators. In 1986, the Link-Belt Construction Equipment Company was formed as a joint venture between FMC Corporation and Sumitomo Heavy Industries.

Between 1965 and 1985 FMC was the owner of the Gunderson metal works in Oregon USA, during that period it was known as the 'Marine and Rail Equipment Division of FMC' (MRED), it was sold in 1985 to The Greenbrier Companies.

In the 1980s, 1990s, and 2000s (decade), FMC Corporation began spinning several of its divisions into separate companies, including United Defense and FMC Technologies, and selling its divisions, including the John Bean Company, now a subsidiary of Snap-on Equipment, a division of Snap-on. Bolens was sold to Troy Built in 1991.

On April 30, 2008, FMC Technologies announced the spinoff of its airport and food equipment businesses into a separate company named John Bean Technologies Corporation, headquartered in Chicago, Illinois. JBT is named after the spray pump inventor whose business was the foundation of FMC Corp.

In 2023 JBT sold AeroTech, which produces airport equipment, to the Oshkosh Corporation.

== Acquisitions ==
2015

- September: A&B Process Systems - processing systems for the beverage and food industries

2017

- February: Avure Technologies, Inc. - high pressure processing (HPP) systems
- July: PLF International Limited - powder filling systems for the global food and beverage markets

2018

- January: Schröder Maschinenbau KG - complementary protein processing equipment which JBT Wolf-tec has distributed for many years

2019

- June: Proseal - tray sealing technology for the food industry

2021

- March: AutoCoding Systems - label inspection and verification software
- June: Prevenio - food safety primarily for the poultry industry
- November: Urtasun - fruit and vegetable processing

2022

- July: Alco-food-machines - further food processing and production lines
- September: Bevcorp - equipment and aftermarket support for the beverage processing and packaging market in the United States

2025

- January: JBT Corporation completed its proposed acquisition of Marel. Following this JBT changed its corporate name to JBT Marel Corporation

== Organization ==
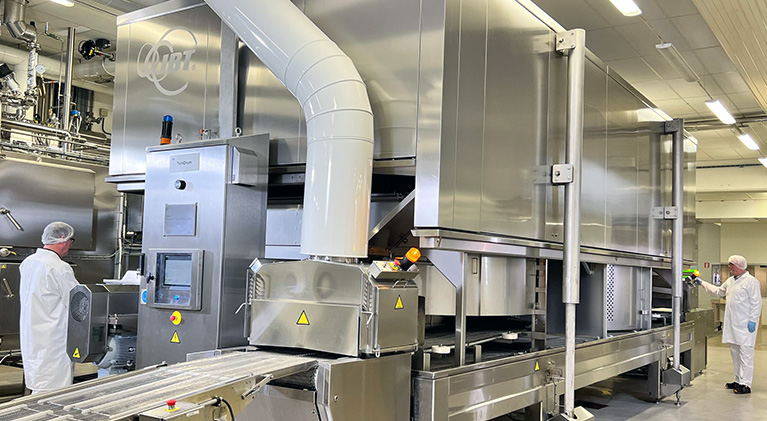
JBT Spiral Oven

JBT designs, produces, and services products and systems for a broad range of end markets, generating roughly one-half of annual revenue from recurring parts, service, rebuilds, and leasing operations.

JBT also has an automated guided vehicle (AGV) business focused on material handling in the automotive, food & beverage, manufacturing, printing, warehousing, and hospital industries.
