= 66°North =

Icelandic outdoor clothing retailer

66°North is an Icelandic outdoor clothing retailer based in Reykjavík.

== History ==
66°North was founded in 1926 in the fishing village of Suðureyri, Iceland, by Hans Kristjánsson under the name Sjóklæðagerð Íslands (Icelandic Sea-Clothing Workshop). Originally focused on producing oilskin coats and overalls for fishermen and laborers, 66°North relocated its operations to Reykjavík in the early 1930s and began supplying outerwear to Icelandic search-and-rescue teams.

In 1977, the company adopted the name 66°North, referencing the latitude of the Arctic Circle.

In 1995, 66°North developed the Flot Overall, an insulated suit that floats on water.

In 1999, manufacturing operations were transferred to company-owned facilities in Latvia.

In 2011, ownership transferred to Helgi Rúnar Óskarsson, who assumed the role of CEO, and Bjarney Harðardóttir.
