= BYKO =

Icelandic retail chain

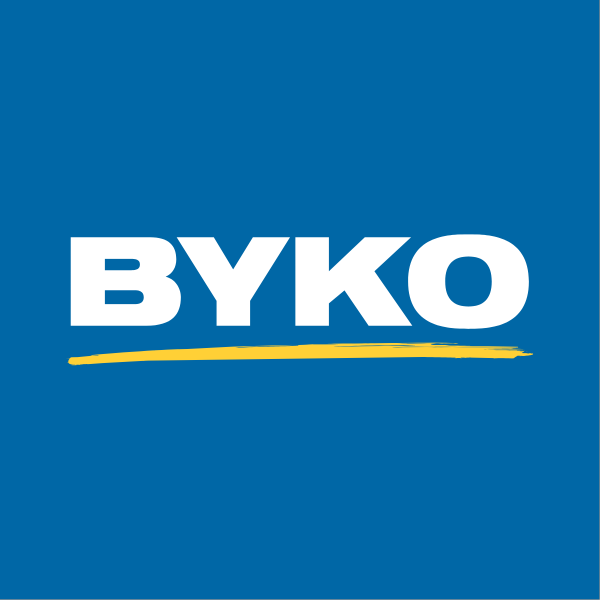
- BYKO logo
- Formerly: Byggingavöruverslun Kópavogs
- Industry: Retail
- Genre: Hardware
- Founded: 1962; 64 years ago in Kópavogur, Iceland
- Founder: Guðmundur H. Jónsson; Hjalti Bjarnason
- Headquarters: Reykjavík, Iceland
- Area served: Iceland
- Website: byko.is

BYKO is an Icelandic hardware store chain.

== History ==
In 1962 Guðmundur H. Jónsson and Hjalti Bjarnason opened a hardware store on Kársnesbraut in Kópavogur under the name Byggingavöruverslun Kópavogs. In 1972, the store was moved to Nýbýlavegur 6, and by 1988 the store had moved once again to a larger premises

BYKO currently operates stores in six locations around the country, with the flagship store being in Reykjavík.
