= Metro (restaurant chain) =

Icelandic fast food restaurant chain

- Metro logo

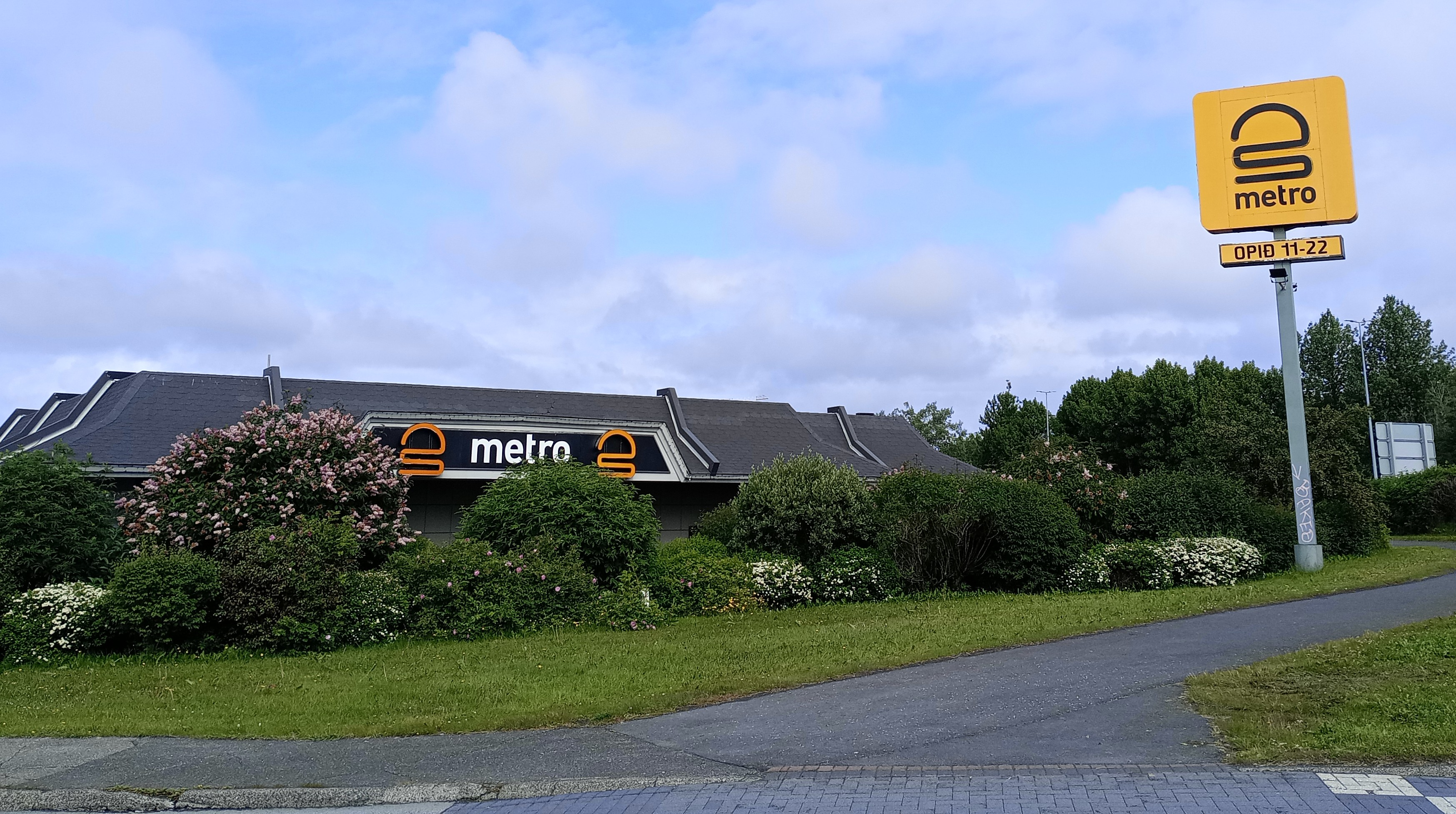
- A former McDonald's branch which has been converted to a Metro fast food restaurant
- Formerly: McDonald's Iceland (1993–2009)
- Industry: Restaurants
- Genre: Fast food restaurant
- Predecessor: McDonald's Iceland (1993–2009)
- Founded: 1993; 33 years ago in Reykjavík, Iceland (as McDonald's); 1 November 2009; 16 years ago in Reykjavík, Iceland (as Metro)
- Founder: Magnus Ogmundsson
- Headquarters: Reykjavík, Iceland
- Number of locations: 2 restaurants (2019)
- Area served: Iceland
- Products: Hamburgers; chicken; french fries; soft drinks; milkshakes; salads; desserts; fruits; wraps
- Number of employees: 90 (2009)
- Parent: McDonald's (1993–2009); Lyst Hr. (2009–2010); Lífs og heilsu ehf. (2010–2013); M-Veitingar ehf. (2013–present)
- Website: metro.is

Metro is an Icelandic fast food restaurant chain. It replaced McDonald's after it left Iceland on 30 October 2009 as a result of the 2008–2011 Icelandic financial crisis and high tariffs on imported ingredients. The franchise holder, Lyst Hr., refused to increase the prices of their products, to stay competitive with local restaurants who used ingredients sourced locally. The franchise owner decided to close down all McDonald's operations and replaced them with their own franchise, Metro.

In contrast with McDonald's, Metro uses cheaper, locally supplied ingredients, which enables them to sell their products at lower prices. Some original McDonald's menu items are on the Metro menu along with domestic products, with menu items previously used in McDonald's now translated to the Icelandic language.

== History ==
=== McDonald's Iceland (1993-2009) ===
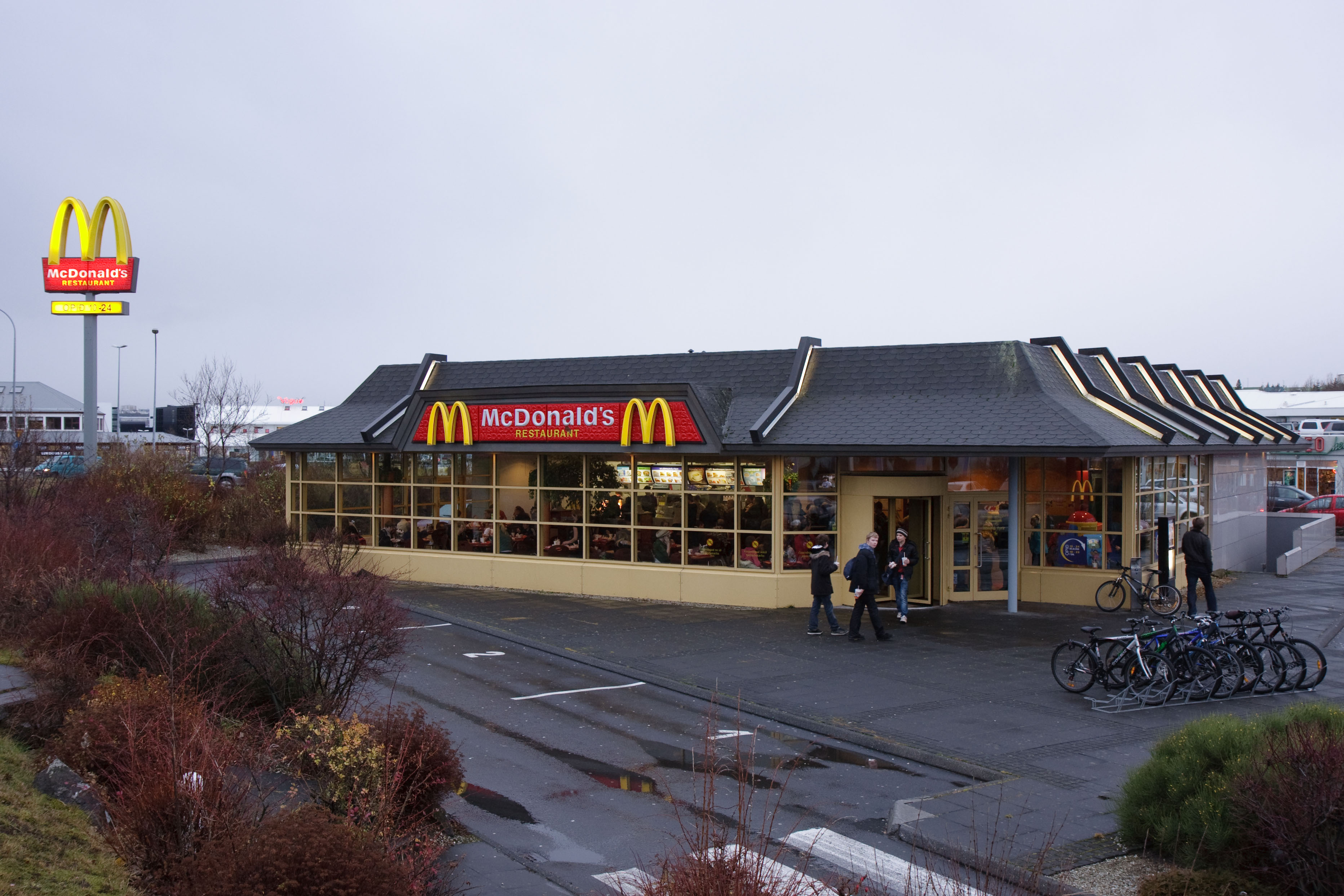
Former McDonald's branch in Reykjavík; following its closure, it was reopened as a Metro

McDonald's opened its first Icelandic restaurant in Reykjavík in 1993 in response to the rising wealth of Icelandic residents. The then prime minister of Iceland, Davíð Oddsson, became the first Icelandic customer to order the Big Mac. Prior to 2004, McDonald's relied on locally supplied meat from Iceland. However, following the shortages of local meats, McDonald's relied on imported meats, especially from Germany, which continued until the closure of McDonald's Iceland.

In 2008, Iceland suffered a financial crisis which caused the Icelandic krona to weaken. This, coupled with the high import tariff imposed on imported goods, caused the cost of key ingredients to increase - a kilogram of onions from Germany cost the equivalent to a bottle of whisky. This made the Big Mac price in Iceland to rise from 650 krona (US$5.29) to 780 krona (US$6.36), thus becoming the most expensive Big Mac ever sold in 2009, surpassing the price of Big Macs sold in Switzerland and Norway (US$5.75). The managing director of Lyst Hr., Magnus Ogmundsson, who managed the franchising of McDonald's in Iceland, decided that it was not worth raising the price of their products in order to compete with other restaurants which used locally sourced ingredients. Hence, all McDonald's stores in Iceland were closed in October 2009, with no plans to revive McDonald's Iceland in the future. When the closure was announced on 26 October 2009, many concerned customers rushed in for the last-minute opportunity to have a meal at McDonald's. This caused the sales of McDonald's to spike, where more than 10,000 burgers were sold in a day, and shortages of staff to handle the large number of customers. The Big Mac was sold out on 29 October 2009. The last McDonald's branch was closed on 30 October 2009. By the time of the closure, one burger cost 230 krona (US$1.87). The last order for a McDonald's burger and french fries was sold to an individual who offered to donate these foods to National Museum of Iceland. The gifts were rejected by the museum curator and were later transferred to one of the hostels in South Iceland for exhibition.

=== Metro (2009–present) ===
On 1 November 2009, Lyst Hr. reopened all former McDonald's branches in Iceland under the brand Metro. The new operation used locally sourced ingredients which were much cheaper than imported ingredients, and retained 90 employees who previously worked in McDonald's prior to closure, while creating additional 15 job openings available to Icelanders. To this day, its menu retains some of the original McDonald's menu items in addition to domestic products. However, the original McDonald's menu items used in Metro are translated to Icelandic.

In June 2010, Lyst Hr. sold Metro to another company, Lífs og heilsu ehf., before Lyst Hr. declared bankruptcy. While the sale of the subsidiary excluded the debts from previous parent company, the new parent company, Lífs og heilsu ehf., hoped that since the acquisition of Metro, the company could help settle Lyst Hr.'s debt in full. However, the rising debts of the new parent company, Lífs og heilsu ehf., caused the parent company itself to declare bankruptcy. Lífs og heilsu ehf. sold Metro to M-Veitingar ehf. in January 2013.

In May 2015, due to strikes at the Icelandic Veterinary Association, many Icelandic restaurants were affected by meat shortages which included Metro and KFC. As a result, Metro temporarily replaced beef with pork in their hamburger.

In 2019, one of the Metro restaurants in Reykjavík closed, leaving only 2 restaurants remaining.

== Products ==
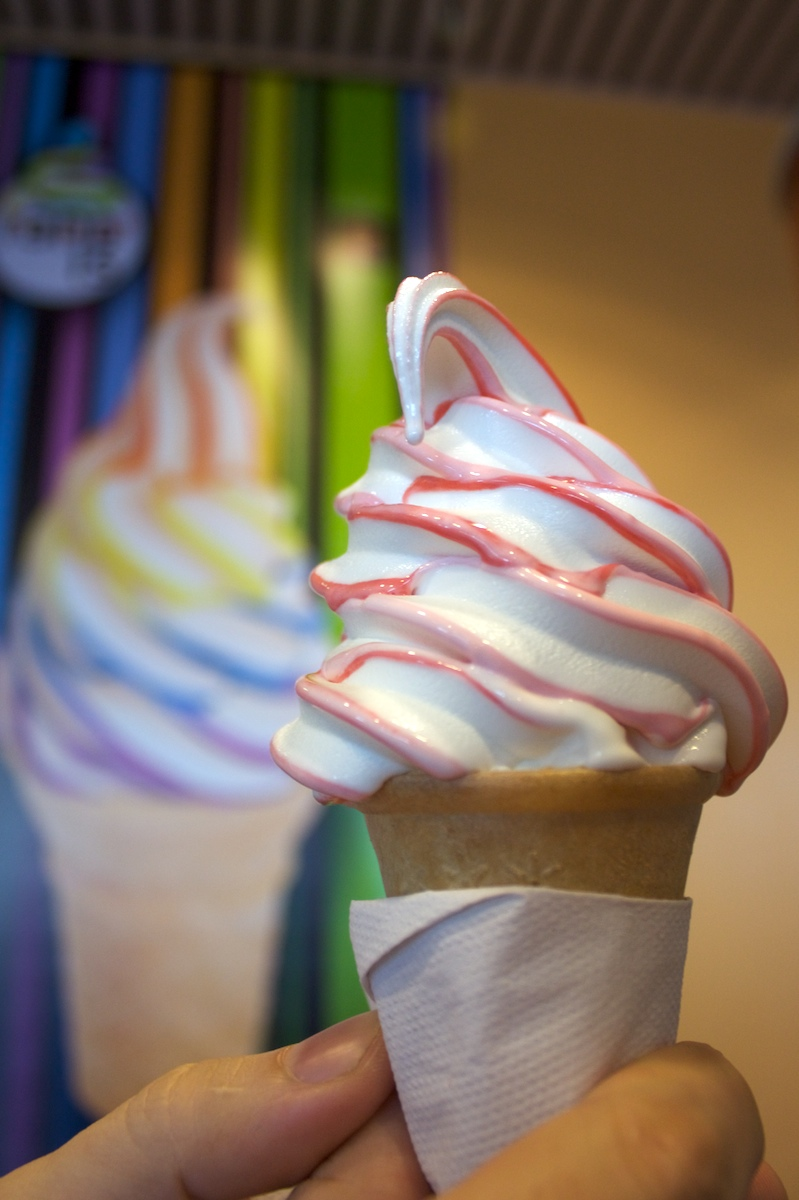
Randís, an ice cream offered from Metro

Metro predominantly sells hamburgers, French fries, grilled chicken, chicken nuggets, salads and wraps. The chain also has sides like mozzarella sticks, soft drinks, milkshakes, and fruit.

Metro's flagship product, Heimsborgari, is a hamburger that is equivalent to the McDonald's Big Mac.

Since 2011, the menu has been revamped to meet the needs of health-conscious customers, as well as the regular customers. The revamped menu includes a new salad range such as Caesar salad and haystack, and the introduction of naan as a choice for wraps. In addition, Metro shows customers the calories of all food items offered.

Despite the company's commitment to use locally supplied ingredients and materials such as vegetables and meats, some ingredients such as breads, cheese and naan are imported from overseas instead.

== Restaurant ==
As of 2019, the company operates two branches in Iceland, one in Skeifan and another one in Smartorg. Similar to McDonald's, it offers drive-through service, indoor seating and a playground.

== Reception ==
On the first day of the opening of the Metro restaurant, the reception was quite positive, where many customers had been queuing up during the opening and also unusually high numbers of drivers queued at the drive thru section placing orders. In addition, due to the company's ability to decide the pricing for the products, as well as offering healthier food choices to health-conscious customers, Metro's business has been slightly improved.

== See also ==
- McDonald's
- List of countries with McDonald's restaurants
- List of restaurants in Iceland
- Vkusno i tochka, a similar chain of McDonald's replacements in Russia.
