= Magnús Scheving =

Icelandic writer and athlete (born 1964)

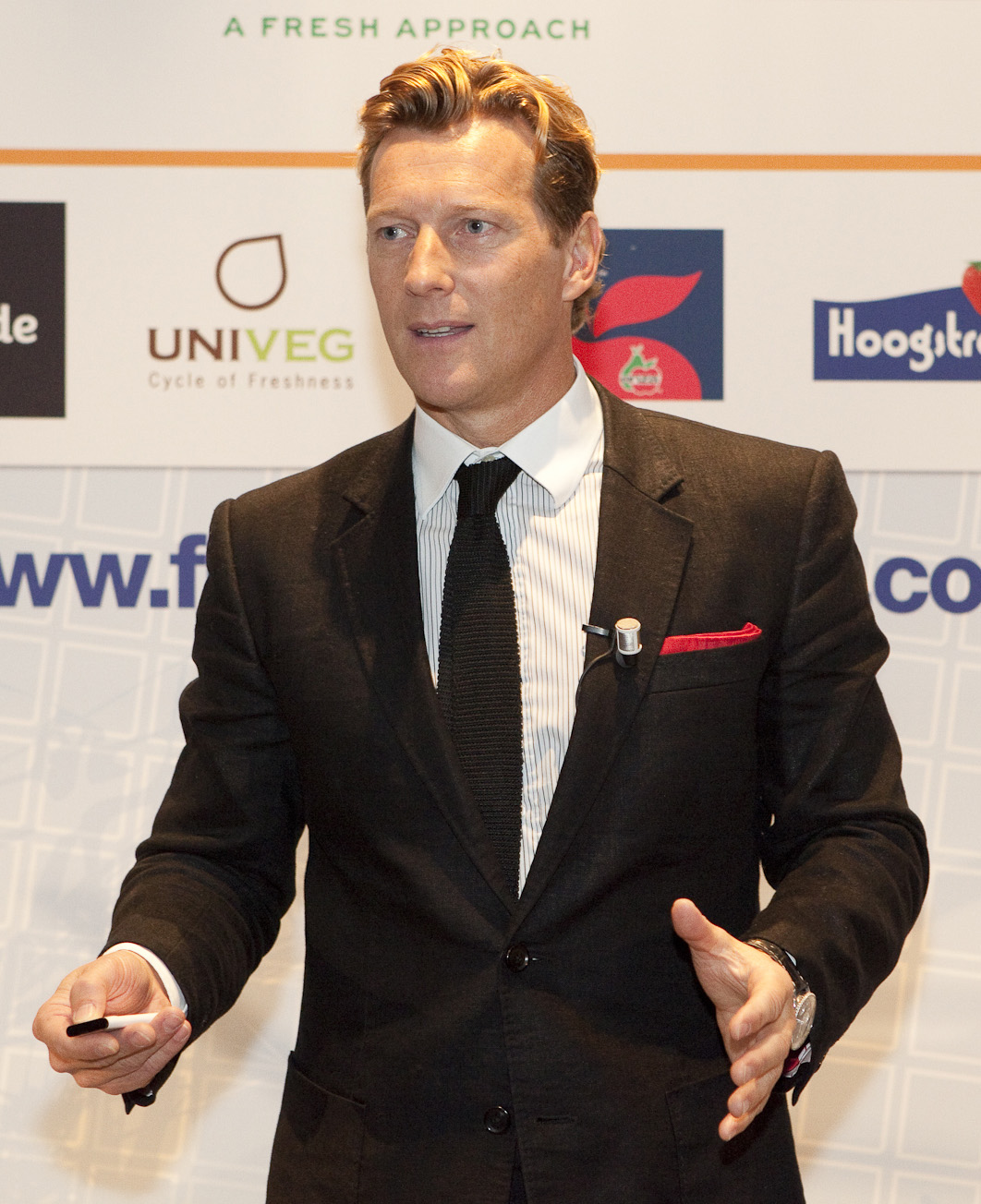
- Magnús at FRESH 2011
- Born: Magnús Örn Eyjólfsson Scheving; 10 November 1964 (age 61); Borgarnes, Iceland
- Occupations: Writer; TV producer; actor; athlete; entrepreneur; public speaker
- Years active: 1990–present
- Known for: LazyTown (2004–2014)
- Spouses: Ragnheiður Melsteð (m. 1989; div. 2014) Hrefna Björk Sverrisdóttir (m. 2020)
- Children: 4
- Sports career
Medal record
Aerobic gymnastics
Representing Iceland
Scandinavian Aerobic Gymnastics Championships
Gold medal – first place	1993	Individual Men's
European Aerobic Gymnastics Championships
Gold medal – first place	1995	Individual Men's
Gold medal – first place	1994	Individual Men's
Aerobic Gymnastics World Championships
Silver medal – second place	1994	Individual Men's
Bronze medal – third place	1993	Individual Men's

Magnús Örn Eyjólfsson Scheving (Icelandic: [ˈmaknus ˈscɛːviŋk]; born 10 November 1964) is an Icelandic writer, television producer, entrepreneur, actor, and former athlete. He is best known as the creator of the children's television show LazyTown, on which he served as a producer and director, and portrayed the character Sportacus. A two–time European champion as well as World championship silver and bronze medalist in aerobic gymnastics, he was named the Icelandic Sportsperson of the Year in 1994.

== Early life ==
Magnús Scheving was born on 10 November 1964, to Þórveig Hjartardóttir and Eyjólfur Magnússon Scheving. He grew up in the small Icelandic town of Borgarnes. At 15 years old, he had his first job as a telephone exchange messenger for Borgarnes.

His knowledge in both architecture and carpentry allowed him to build his own house later on, which he described as "physically...[laying] every brick and roof tile."

In his twenties, he made a bet with a woodworking friend, Fjölnir Þorgeirsson, that either would master a sport of the other's choosing (that they knew nothing about) within three years. Magnús chose snooker for Fjölnir, and Fjölnir chose aerobics for Magnús. Eventually, Magnús became a national champion in aerobics, and Fjölnir became a national champion in snooker. He has an older sister and a younger brother.

== Early career and inspiration ==
In 1992, Magnús became the Icelandic Men's Individual Champion in aerobic gymnastics. In 1993, he became the Scandinavian champion, and was the European champion twice in 1994 and 1995. He competed at the FIG Suzuki World Cup three times and won bronze in 1993, silver in 1994 and placed fifth in 1995. He was named the Icelandic Sportsperson of the Year in 1994.

In addition to his sports career, Magnús became a well-known and sought after public and motivational speaker around the world. In 1995, he published a children's book called Áfram Latibær, the first recorded work in the LazyTown franchise. During this time, he was also running a carpentry business, which gave him the money to travel the world.

== LazyTown ==
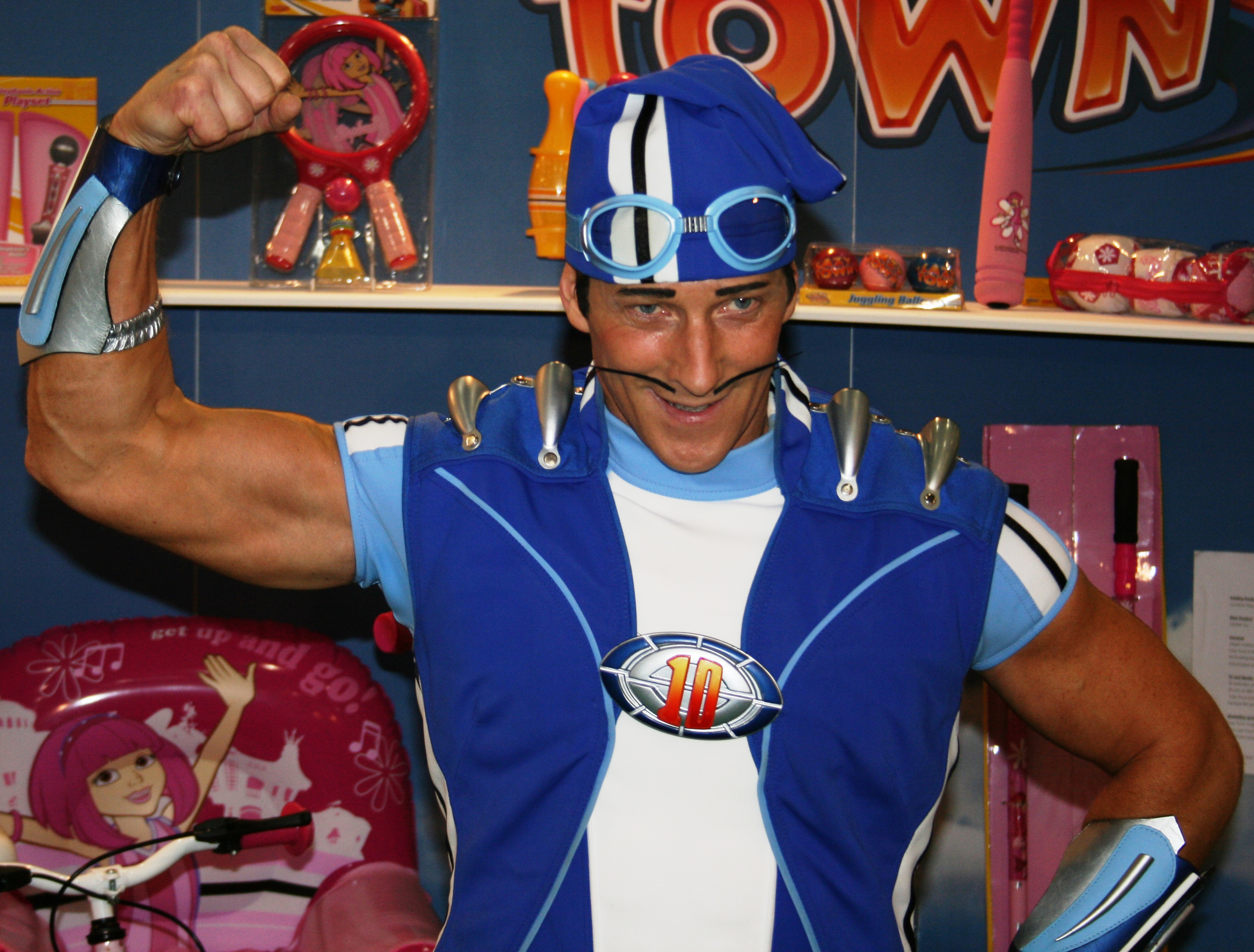
Magnús as Sportacus in 2009

In the 1990s, during his public speaking and aerobics career, Magnús noticed an absence in healthy lifestyle role models for children. In a 2019 talk, he recalled,

I realized, thirty years ago actually, there was no role model in health for kids. There was Popeye, who eats spinach, but he smoked and hit people. And you thought, maybe that's not a good role model. Maybe we need a different role model for kids. And there was no entertainment brand dedicated to kids' health in the world.

In 1995, he published Áfram Latibær, an Icelandic children's book which told a narrative story about a sports elf giving townsfolk tips on how to eat healthily and exercise. The book was adapted into a stage play of the same name directed by Baltasar Kormákur. The show toured Iceland from 1996–1997 and made LazyTown a household name across Iceland. It was shown to be immensely popular among children and so, a sequel was written, Glanni Glæpur Í Latabæ, which was the first time Robbie Rotten was introduced, played by Stefán Karl Stefánsson.

LazyTown was commissioned by Nickelodeon in May 2003 and the first episode aired on Nick Jr. on 16 August 2004.

Magnús is the creator and co-founder of LazyTown Entertainment. This company produces books, videos, games, and sporting goods to help promote fitness and a healthy lifestyle to children. He is also the creator of the show LazyTown (Latibær in Iceland), where he played Sportacus (known as Íþróttaálfurinn in Icelandic) from 2004 to 2014.

In 2006, Magnús received a Lifetime Achievement Award at the Icelandic Edda Award ceremonies for his work as founder and creator of the LazyTown franchise. Ólafur Ragnar Grímsson, President of Iceland, presented the award to him.

After LazyTown Entertainment was bought by Turner Broadcasting in the summer of 2011, Magnús continued to play Sportacus. However, in 2014, he announced that he would be departing the role of Sportacus (after the end of the TV series), passing it on to Dýri Kristjánsson, who played Sportacus in all subsequent live shows. He also announced in 2014 that he would depart from his position as CEO of LazyTown Entertainment.

On 16 May 2024, it was announced that Magnús Scheving had agreed to a deal with Warner Bros. Discovery to purchase back the company and the rights to the LazyTown brand.

=== Theme park ===
In 2021, Magnús and entrepreneur Helga Halldórsdóttir announced their goal to build a LazyTown theme park in Magnús's hometown of Borgarnes, which inspired the series. They claimed the project has been ongoing since 2017. Magnús described the plans to create an "experience garden" with indoor and outdoor facilities, both pertaining to the production history and the history of Borgarnes. Borgarnes legislation supported this due to its ability to welcome tourists; 35 thousand visitors are expected in its first year, followed by 50 thousand in the next 4 years. The park was expected to open by 2024.

=== April 1st hoax ===
On 1 April 2022, Magnús appeared in Icelandic Crossfit athlete Björgvin K. Guðmundsson's facetious Instagram announcement, wherein a LazyTown "full length motion picture" and "brand new series" was announced. The photographs showed the pair signing contracts and shaking hands before large posters of LazyTown characters and memorabilia. Björgvin announced that he was quitting crossfit in pursuit of professional acting, being specifically trained in song and dance to portray Sportacus. Due to its posting date and Björgvin's continued career in crossfit, the announcement was an April Fools' Day hoax.

== Other projects ==
In 2010, Magnús co-starred in the Jackie Chan film The Spy Next Door, in which he portrayed a Russian villain attempting to destroy the world's oil supplies.

In November 2022, Magnús spoke at the World Business Forum in New York City on the topic of "great ideas" and creativity. Later that week, he spoke at the WBF in Bogotá, Colombia on November 9 or 10, on the topic of high performance teams. While in Colombia, Magnús encountered an enthusiastic Sportacus cosplayer.

=== ROK restaurant ===
Since mid-2016, along with his partner, Hrefna Björk Sverrisdóttir, he has owned and managed ROK restaurant, a "fine casual" Icelandic restaurant in Reykjavík. The restaurant offers Icelandic staples including reindeer steak, local cheeses, and char. The menu has a "Green" section devoted to vegetarian options, and its dishes incorporates Scandinavian, Mediterranean and American elements.

In 2017, food critic Ragnar Egilsson gave the food a mediocre review, claiming the restaurant's success was due to its proximity to Hallgrímskirkja, a tourist destination. In 2018, ROK was included in Iceland Monitor's list of the best happy hours in Reykjavík. As of 2019, the menu has expanded to include vegan options.

== Legal issues ==
In 2025 the Icelandic Competition Authority formally opened an investigation into possible wrongdoing related to the circumvention of Icelandic laws by a restaurant employers' organization acronymized SVEIT. SVEIT had been accused by union Efling and others of founding a company union, Virðing. Shortly after its founding Virðing negotiated with SVEIT inferior terms than had already been negotiated by the far larger union Efling and the far larger employers' organization Confederation of Icelandic Enterprise. Thereafter the Labour Court ruled the inferior terms to be unlawful, explaining in its decision that the existing contract between Efling and CIE was legitimate and that Icelandic law forbade the negotiation of lesser terms of employment than those found in an existing contract. Magnús and his wife Hrefna are both subjects of the investigation, both through the couple's company Taste plc, as well as Hrefna's multi-year chairmanship of SVEIT. The investigation seeks to clarify whether the founding of Virðing and the ensuing negotiation with SVEIT of lesser employment terms were an illegal conspiracy by the restauranteurs. The couple have been ordered by the ICA to hand over correspondence with anyone connected to Virðing, as well as correspondence with anyone who has ever worked for SVEIT. The ICA confirmed to the Icelandic National Broadcasting Service that the sort of lawbreaking being investigated may result in hefty fines and/or multi-year prison sentences when violations are adjudicated.

== Filmography ==
Film
Year	Film	Role	Notes
2010	The Spy Next Door	Anton Poldark	

Television
Year	Film	Role	Notes
2004–2014	LazyTown	Sportacus	Lead role English & Icelandic dub
2006	The Paul O'Grady Show	Sportacus	Surprise Guest
2008	LazyTown Extra	Sportacus	Lead role

== Personal life ==
In 1989, Magnús married Ragnheiður Melsteð, with whom he lived for 24 years and co-founded the LazyTown production company. Magnús and Ragnheiður have a daughter and a son. The couple divorced in 2014. Their daughter, Sylvia Erla, is a singer who reached the semi-finals of the Söngvakeppnin in 2013, but did not make it to the final. Magnús also has a daughter with his former partner, Halldóra Blöndall. He also has a stepdaughter.

In January 2017, Magnús got engaged to Hrefna Björk Sverrisdóttir in their restaurant ROK. The couple married in 2020. In December 2022, Hrefna announced the birth of their son on her Instagram page.

== Production work ==
Year	Film				
Year	Film	Director	Writer	Producer	Creator
2010	The Spy Next Door	No	No	No	No
2004–2007; 2013–2014	LazyTown	Yes	Yes	Yes	Yes
2008	LazyTown Extra	No	Yes	Yes	Yes

== Awards and accolades ==
- PROTOS Award: Universidad de Panamericana in Mexico City
- BAFTA International Children's Award (2006) for LazyTown in collaboration with Raymond P. Le Gué and Jonathan Judge
- Edda Award (2006) by the Icelandic Film and Television Academy for LazyTown
