= Hrefna Björk Sverrisdóttir =

Icelandic businesswoman and television producer (born 1981)

- Born: 2 November 1981 (age 44); Iceland
- Occupations: Businesswoman; television producer
- Spouse: Magnús Scheving (m. 2020)
- Children: 2

Hrefna Björk Sverrisdóttir (Icelandic: [ˈr̥ɛpn̥a ˈpjœr̥k ˈsvɛrɪstouhtɪr]; born November 2, 1981) is an Icelandic businesswoman and television producer who was Head of Creative Development and Operations of LazyTown Entertainment under Turner Broadcasting. In 2000 she founded the monthly magazine Orðlaus along with Steinunn Jakobsdóttir and Erna Þrastardóttir. In 2005 they sold the magazine to the publisher Ár og dagur. In 2011 she opened an adventure park in Reykjavík. In 2016 she opened the restaurant ROK.

== Personal life ==
In January 2017 she got engaged to Magnús Scheving, whom she married in 2020. In December 2022 she announced the birth of their son. Hrefna also has a daughter from her former relationship.
