= Marel =

Icelandic food company

Marel hf.
- Type: Hlutafélag
- Industry: Food processing
- Founded: Reykjavík, Iceland (March 17, 1983)
- Founder: Rögnvaldur Ólafsson; Þórður Vigfússon
- Headquarters: Garðabær, Iceland
- Area served: Worldwide
- Key people: Árni Sigurðsson (CEO); Arnar Thor Masson (Chairman)
- Products: Food processing equipment, systems, software
- Revenue: ▲€1.709 billion (2022)
- Operating income: ▼€97.0 million (2022)
- Net income: ▼€58.7 million (2022)
- Total assets: ▲€2.696 billion (2022)
- Total equity: ▲€1.028 billion (2022)
- Number of employees: 8,000 (2022)

Marel is a multi-national food processing company based in Iceland and headquartered in Garðabær. The company manufactures equipment and other services for food processing in the poultry, meat, and fish industries. Marel has approximately 8,000 employees across 30 countries.

== History ==
Marel's began in 1977 with a project at the University of Iceland focused on developing motion-compensating onboard scales. The company itself was founded in 1983. Its primary business is developing and providing equipment, software, and services for automating processes in the poultry, meat, and fish industries. This includes automating tasks across various stages of production, from receiving, processing, packing, and final dispatch.

Marel engineers implemented early computer technology into food processing equipment, an area where it had not been used extensively. The design plan was to have an array of connected systems to increase automation in food processing.

== Products ==
Marel develops, manufactures, sells, and distributes equipment, processing equipment, software, and services for the poultry, fish, and meat industries. Its poultry processing sector sells integrated systems for processing broilers. The fish processing sector sells equipment and systems for farmed and wild salmon and whitefish processing. Marel's processing division carries systems and equipment for slaughtering, deboning and trimming, and case-ready food services. Marel also carries wastewater treatment equipment designed for the processing industry.

== Corporation ==
The Marel brand was established in 1983 and went public on the Icelandic Stock Exchange in 1992, marking its transition from a startup to a global company.

In 2007, Marel changed its corporate identity to Marel Food Systems after acquiring four new brands in 2006: AEW Delford, Carnitech, Marel, and Scanvaegt. The acquisition of these companies significantly increased the size of Marel's operations globally. On January 1, 2010, Marel Food Systems hf. changed its name to Marel hf. after its integration with Dutch company Stork Food Systems was completed; Marel's practice is integrate the companies it acquires under a common identity.

Marel bought MPS meat processing systems in 2015 for €382 million to bolster its foothold in the red meat industry (pig, cattle, and sheep) and balance its expertise in the fish and poultry industries. In conjunction with the sale, Marel also acquired MPS's intra-logistics systems for food industries and industrial wastewater treatment systems. MPS has headquarters in the Netherlands, with production sites in the Netherlands and China.

In July 2017, Marel acquired Brazilian company Sulmaq to expand its operations in Central and South America. Sulmaq was based in the state of Rio Grande do Sul in southern Brazil and employed approximately 400 people. Sulmaq's processing operations included hog and cattle slaughtering, cutting and deboning, viscera processing and logistics.

On August 14, 2018, Marel finalized the acquisition of German-based manufacturer of processing equipment MAJA. As a result, Marel acquired a diverse product line-up and a global distribution network. In October 2019, Marel acquired Australian company Cedar Creek Company, a company specializing in software and hardware equipment for meat processing. In November 2019, Marel finalized a 40% share in Icelandic company Curio ehf, a manufacturer of advanced equipment for whitefish processing.

On June 7, 2019, Marel had its initial public offering on the Euronext Amsterdam stock exchange (ticker symbol: MAREL). Amsterdam was chosen for the second listing of Marel shares as the company already had a strong presence in the Netherlands, where 1/3 of its employees are based.

On December 11, 2023, Árni Sigurðsson was appointed CEO of Marel hf.

In January 2025, it was announced that JBT Corporation had completed its acquisition of Marel. As a result, the Chicago-based company was renamed JBT Marel Corporation, as well as being listed on the New York Stock Exchange and Nasdaq Iceland.

== Controversies ==
Marel has been criticized for continuing its business operations in Russia despite the ongoing war in Ukraine. While many companies have exited the Russian market due to international sanctions and ethical concerns, Marel has maintained its presence, leading to backlash from organizations advocating for corporate accountability,

== Key acquisitions dates ==
- 1997 – Marel acquires Carnitech in Denmark
- 2002 – Marel acquires CP Food Machinery
- 2004 – Marel acquires Pols in Iceland
- 2006 – Marel acquires AEW Delford in the UK
- 2006 – Marel acquires Scanvaegt in Denmark
- 2008 – Marel acquires Stork Food Systems in the Netherlands together with Townsend, owned by Stork
- 2016 – Marel acquires MPS in the Netherlands
- 2017 – Marel acquires Sulmaq in Brazil
- 2018 – Marel acquires MAJA in Germany
- 2019 – Marel acquires Cedar Creek of Brisbane, Australia and Curio ehf, Hafnarfjörður, Iceland
- 2021 – Marel announces acquisition of Valka
- 2022 – Marel acquires Wenger in the United States

== Awards ==
In 2012 Marel was awarded the EuroTier Gold Award for its contribution in environmental conservation and product safety for poultry processing. The American Meat Institute named Marel their supplier of the year in 2013. In 2014, Marel Stork Poultry Processing won an award in the category of Processing with their "New reference in whole product distribution". Marel also received the most public votes at the event, making it the overall winner of the VIV Europe 2014 innovation award.

In Georgia, USA, Marel Stork Poultry Processing was recognized in 2014 by Gainesville-Hall County in their Industry of the Year Awards. In October 2017, Marel's "Robot with a Knife" won the Food Processing Award in the category of "Robotics and Automation".
