= Teris =

Icelandic software company

- Company type: Information technology company
- Industry: Information technology for financial services
- Founded: 1989; 37 years ago
- Headquarters: Kópavogur, Iceland
- Key people: Sæmundur Sæmundsson, Chief executive officer
- Products: Banking and financial services,
- Revenue: Unknown
- Number of employees: 145
- Website: www.teris.is

Teris was an Icelandic software company that focused on servicing the financial sector. It was founded as Tölvumiðstöð Sparisjóðanna (Savings Banks Computer Centre), and changed its name on March 23, 2007, to reflect changes in clientele and ownership. In 2012, Teris merged with Reiknistofa Bankanna

== History ==
Teris’ predecessor, Tölvumiðstöð Sparisjóðanna, was founded in March 1989 by six of the largest savings banks in Iceland together with Lánastofnun Sparisjóðanna (the Savings Banks Lending Organization – renamed Icebank). Other savings banks soon joined the partnership.

The Computer Centre began as the computer division for the savings banks. Gradually the number of shareholders increased, more finance companies joined the group and the firm expanded.

== Services ==
Teris provided services as a dedicated computer department, and sold software to several financial institutions and companies in Iceland, the Faroe Islands and Norway.
