= Össur =

Multinational corporation for prosthetics based in Reykjavik, Iceland

Össur hf.

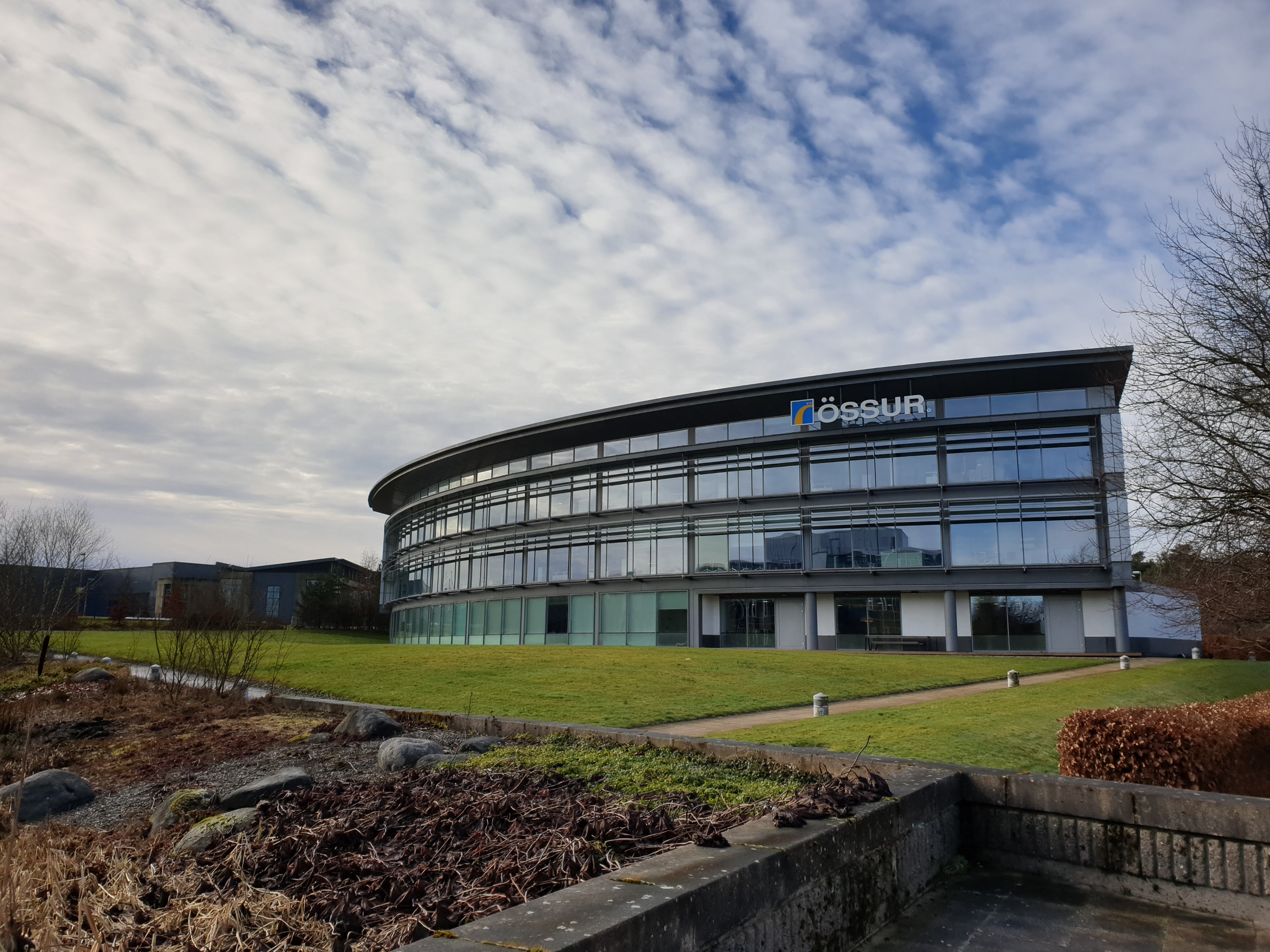
- Offices in Livingston, Scotland
- Type: Hlutafélag
- Traded as: Nasdaq Copenhagen: OSSR
- Industry: Health care
- Founded: 1971
- Headquarters: Reykjavík, Iceland
- Area served: Global
- Key people: Sveinn Solvason (President and CEO); Niels Jacobsen (Chairman); Gudný Arna Sveinsdóttir (CFO)
- Products: Non-invasive orthopaedic bracing and support, compression therapy, prosthetics
- Revenue: ▲US $719 million (2022)
- Operating income: ▲US $114 million (2022)
- Net income: ▲US $43 million (2022)
- Total assets: ▲US $1091 million (2019)
- Total equity: ▲US $569 million (2019)
- Number of employees: 4000 (average, 2020)
- Website: www.ossur.com

Össur hf. (Note: hf. stands for hlutafélag (lit. 'joint-stock company' or more precisely 'limited liability company').) (Icelandic pronunciation: [ˈœsːʏr]) is a company based in Iceland that develops, manufactures and sells non-invasive equipment for orthopaedics, including bracing and support products, compression therapy, and prosthetics. The company is headquartered in Reykjavík, with offices in the Americas, Europe, and Asia, and distributors in other markets.

== History ==
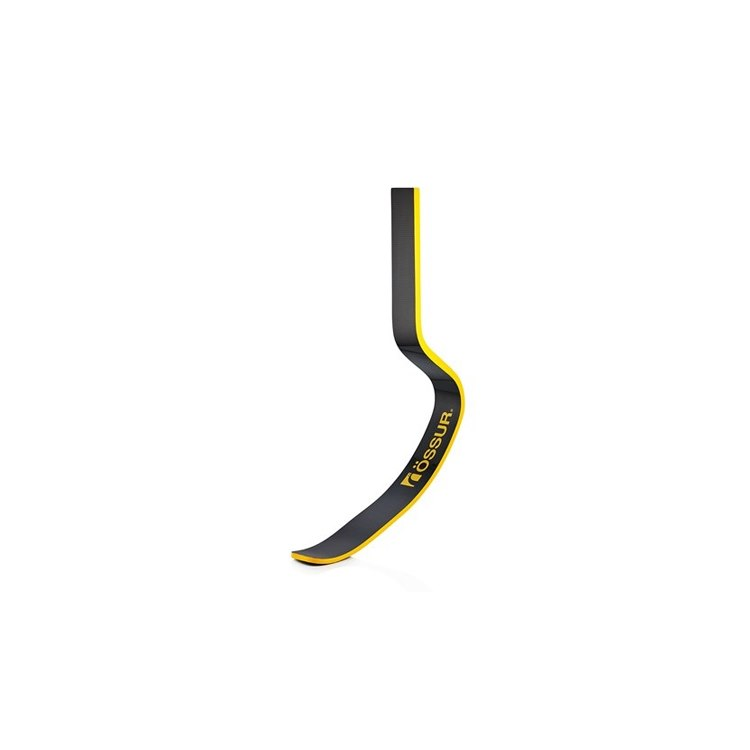
Össur leg blade

Össur was founded in Iceland in 1971 by Össur Kristinsson, a prosthetist. His family owned the company until 1999, when it went public and was listed on the Iceland Stock Exchange. Initially, the company served only the domestic Icelandic market, and then began to export in 1986 and expanded rapidly through a series of strategic acquisitions. Össur has been listed on the NASDAQ Copenhagen Stock Exchange since 2009 and celebrated 20 years as a publicly traded company in 2019, by ringing the closing bell at the Nasdaq MarketSite in New York's Times Square. As of 2019 it employs more than 3,500 people in over 25 locations.

In 2006, the company was named as a "technology pioneer" by the World Economic Forum.

=== Acquisitions ===
Since 2000, Össur has acquired over 20 companies:

- 2000 – Skóstofan
- 2000 – Flex-Foot, Inc.
- 2000 – PI Medical AB.
- 2000 – Karlsson & Bergstrom AB.
- 2000 – Century XXII Innovations, Inc
- 2003 – Linea Orthopedics AB.
- 2003 – Generation II Group, Inc.
- 2005 – Advanced Prosthetic Components
- 2005 – Royce Medical, Inc.
- 2005 – Innovative Medical Products, Ltd.
- 2005 – GBM Medical AB.
- 2006 – Innovation Sports, Inc.
- 2006 – Gibaud Group
- 2007 – SOMAS
- 2010 – Orthopaedic Partner Africa
- 2012 – Evolution Industries
- 2013 – TeamOlmed
- 2016 – Touch Bionics
- 2017 – Medi Prosthetics
- 2019 – College Park Industries
- 2023 - Naked Prosthetics
- 2024 - FIOR & GENTZ

== Operations ==
=== Research and development ===
Össur operates five research and development (R&D) departments in four countries, employing 76 people. In-house R&D also partners with third parties, including universities and research companies. In 2007, R&D investment amounted to 6 percent of the company's total sales. The same year, 22 US patents were granted to Össur and 37 new applications filed. At the end of the year, Össur had 218 US, 26 European, and 103 granted international patents in its portfolio, together with 119 US and 239 pending applications world.

=== Products ===
The company operates in three markets: bracing & support, compression therapy, and prosthetics including bionics technology. It manufactures a range of braces and support products for arms, legs, and torso. Products include Unloader One, a brace that provides mechanical support to reduce the knee pain caused by osteoarthritis. It's designed to separate bones when ligaments and cartilage are damaged, and to prevent further damage to the joint. The firm also makes the CTi (formerly sold as the CTi2), a ligament brace for knees used for both rehabilitation and for injury prevention, as well as cervical collars.

Össur entered the compression therapy segment with the acquisition of the French company Gibaud. Products include bandages, tights, stockings, knee highs and stump socks.

==== Prosthetics ====
Össur manufactures prosthetic limbs and joints, liners, sockets, locks and sleeves. Its products include Flex-Foot, a prosthetic foot made from carbon fiber, a material used in the aerospace industry for its strength and flexibility. The Flex-Foot Cheetah developed by medical engineer Van Phillips and worn by Alan Oliveira, Markus Rehm, and other amputee athletes is a derivative of this product line. Össur also produces the Total Knee prosthetic, which possesses a "locking moment" which keeps the knee from collapsing when it is in full extension, Mauch Knee, which has a hydraulic system for fluid and natural gait, and Iceross silicone prosthetic liners, which provide an interface between the skin and the socket.

The company's bionic technology platform is designed to restore anatomical function displaced by amputation by using intelligent structures in products that can respond in a human-like way. The division's products are Rheo Knee, a microprocessor swing and stance knee system which utilizes artificial intelligence, Power Knee, which works as an integrated extension of its user, synchronizing motion with that of the sound leg using motor power, and Proprio Foot, an intelligent and motor-powered foot module.

Össur has been developing a bionic limb controlled using implanted myoelectric sensors developed by the Alfred Mann Foundation. One patient has used the limb for over a year, and reports a positive experience. Össur says that the implantable control sensors will be a technology upgrade for its prosthetics in three to five years. In 2019, Össur and Alfred Mann Foundation signed new agreement to extend exploration of mind-controlled prosthetics.

== Team Össur ==
Team Össur is a group of international para-athletes sponsored by Össur. Sponsees include Sarah Reinertsen, Markus Rehm, Jody Cundy and Rudy Garcia-Tolson.

== See also ==
- Invacare
- Stryker
